= 2015 RoPS season =

RoPS
2015 season
- Chairman: Risto Niva
- Manager: Juha Malinen
- Stadium: Keskuskenttä
- Veikkausliiga: 2nd
- Finnish Cup: Sixth round vs Inter Turku
- League Cup: Runners-up vs HJK
- Top goalscorer: League: Aleksandr Kokko (17); All: Aleksandr Kokko (19)
Home colours	Away colours

The 2015 season is RoPS's 3rd Veikkausliiga season since their promotion back to the top flight in 2012.

== Squad ==
Note: Flags indicate national team as defined under FIFA eligibility rules; some limited exceptions apply. Players may hold more than one non-FIFA nationality.

No.	Pos.	Nation	Player
1	GK	FIN	Ville Iiskola
3	DF	FIN	Jarkko Lahdenmäki
4	MF	FIN	Antti Okkonen (captain)
5	DF	FIN	Janne Saksela
6	DF	FIN	Juha Pirinen
7	MF	FIN	Mika Mäkitalo
8	MF	FIN	Tomas Hradecky
9	FW	JAM	Tremaine Stewart
10	FW	CMR	Jean Fridolin Nganbe Nganbe
11	FW	FIN	Aleksandr Kokko
12	GK	FIN	Harri Nykänen
14	GK	CAN	Tomer Chencinski
16	MF	FIN	Ville Saxman

No.	Pos.	Nation	Player
17	MF	FIN	Olli Pöyliö
18	MF	FIN	Juuso Majava
19	FW	USA	Will John
20	FW	FIN	Simo Roiha
21	MF	FIN	Tommi Haanpää
26	FW	FIN	Eero Markkanen
32	MF	FIN	David Ramadingaye
35	FW	NGR	Adeniyi Michael Ibiyomi
44	GK	BRA	Ricardo
77	MF	FIN	Moshtagh Yaghoubi
80	DF	NGR	Faith Friday Obilor
86	DF	GAM	Abdou Jammeh

== Transfers ==
=== Winter ===
In: Note: Flags indicate national team as defined under FIFA eligibility rules; some limited exceptions apply. Players may hold more than one non-FIFA nationality.

No.	Pos.	Nation	Player
6	MF	FIN	Juha Pirinen (from (Finland) MYPA)
8	MF	FIN	Tomas Hradecký (from (Finland) IFK Mariehamn)
10	FW	CMR	Jean Fridolin Nganbe Nganbe (from (Finland) VPS)
14	GK	CAN	Tomer Chencinski (from (Israel) Maccabi Tel Aviv)
21	MF	FIN	Tommi Haanpää (from (Finland) PS Kemi)
35	FW	NGR	Adeniyi Michael Ibiyomi
44	GK	BRA	Ricardo (from (Brazil) Ituano)
77	FW	FIN	Moshtagh Yaghoubi (from (Latvia) FK Spartaks Jūrmala)
86	DF	GAM	Abdou Jammeh (from (Kuwait) Al-Fahaheel FC)
91	FW	CRO	Vilim Posinković (from (Greece) Iraklis Psachna)

Out: Note: Flags indicate national team as defined under FIFA eligibility rules; some limited exceptions apply. Players may hold more than one non-FIFA nationality.

No.	Pos.	Nation	Player
1	GK	FIN	Saku-Pekka Sahlgren (to (Finland) HJK)
2	DF	FIN	Lassi Nurmos (to (Finland) AC Oulu)
6	DF	NGR	Ndukaku Udoka Alison (to (Finland) AC Kajaani)
8	FW	FIN	Jani Virtanen (to (Finland) FF Jaro)
10	DF	FIN	Nicholas Otaru (to (Finland) FC Honka)
12	GK	FIN	Oskari Forsman (to (Finland) TPS)
13	FW	FIN	Jesse Ahonen (to (Finland) HIFK)
14	FW	TTO	Jamal Gay (loan return to (Trinidad and Tobago) Caledonia AIA)
23	DF	FIN	Antti Peura (to (Finland) AC Oulu)
24	MF	GAM	Sainey Nyassi (to (Canada) FC Edmonton)
31	GK	SLE	Patrick Bantamoi (to (Finland) Viikingit)
45	MF	FIN	Petteri Pennanen (to (Finland) KuPS)

=== Summer ===
In: Note: Flags indicate national team as defined under FIFA eligibility rules; some limited exceptions apply. Players may hold more than one non-FIFA nationality.

No.	Pos.	Nation	Player
9	FW	JAM	Tremaine Stewart (from (Jamaica) Waterhouse)
19	FW	USA	Will John
26	FW	FIN	Eero Markkanen

Out: Note: Flags indicate national team as defined under FIFA eligibility rules; some limited exceptions apply. Players may hold more than one non-FIFA nationality.

No.	Pos.	Nation	Player
1	GK	FIN	Ville Iiskola
91	FW	CRO	Vilim Posinković (to (Greece) Kissamikos)

== Competitions ==
=== Veikkausliiga ===
==== League table ====
Pos	Team	Pld	W	D	L	GF	GA	GD	Pts	Qualification or relegation
1	SJK (C)	33	18	6	9	50	22	+28	60	Qualification for the Champions League second qualifying round
2	RoPS	33	17	8	8	44	29	+15	59	Qualification for the Europa League first qualifying round
3	HJK	33	16	10	7	45	30	+15	58	Qualification for the Europa League first qualifying round
4	Inter Turku	33	13	10	10	45	34	+11	49	
5	Lahti	33	12	12	9	38	36	+2	48	

Source: Veikkausliiga, Soccerway
Rules for classification: 1) Points; 2) Goal difference; 3) Goals scored; 4) Head-to-head points; 5) Head-to-head goal difference; 6) Head-to-head goals scored; 7) Fewer away goals allowed; 8) Home goals scored; 9) Fewer home goals allowed; 10) Play-off. (Note: Criteria 7–10 is only used if deciding Champion, teams to UEFA competitions or teams for relegation).
(C) Champions

==== Results ====
12 April 2015 1	RoPS	1 – 3	HJK	Rovaniemi
17:00 EEST (UTC+3)	Lahdenmäki (yellow card) 17'; Okkonen (yellow card) 44'; A.Ibiyomi 58'; Yaghoubi (yellow card) 90'	Report	Zeneli (yellow card) 12' (goal) 45+2'; Heikkilä 19'; Schüller (yellow card) 61'; Tanaka 71'; Jallow (yellow card) 81'; Lampi (yellow card) 90+1'	Stadium: Keskuskenttä; Attendance: 1,281; Referee: Marko Grönholm

19 April 2015 2	SJK	1 – 0	RoPS	Seinäjoki
16:00 EEST (UTC+3)	Ngueukam (yellow card) 23'; Vasara 79'	Report	Pirinen (yellow card) 70'	Stadium: Seinäjoen keskuskenttä Attendance: 2,048; Referee: Mattias Gestranius

23 April 2015 3	RoPS	0 – 4	Inter Turku	Rovaniemi
18:30 EEST (UTC+3)	Kokko (yellow card) 46'	Report	Lahdenmäki 7' (o.g.); Kauppi 16'; Hambo 34', 90+4'; Diogo (yellow card) 56'; Nyman (yellow card) 78'	Stadium: Keskuskenttä; Attendance: 912; Referee: Mikko Mörö

29 April 2015 4	RoPS	2 – 0	HIFK	Rovaniemi
18:30 EEST (UTC+3)	Kokko (yellow card) 31'; Saksela 45'; Saxman (yellow card) 62'; Pirinen 68'	Report	J.Ahonen (yellow card) 78'	Stadium: Keskuskenttä; Attendance: 961; Referee: Tero Nieminen

3 May 2015 5	Ilves	0 – 1	RoPS	Tampere
16:00 EEST (UTC+3)	Emenike (yellow card) 35'; Ala-Myllymäki (yellow card) 62'	Report	Kokko 23' (yellow card) 50'; Obilor (yellow card) 60'	Stadium: Tammela Stadion; Attendance: 1,975; Referee: Antti Munukka

8 May 2015 6	FF Jaro	1 – 2	RoPS	Jakobstad
18:30 EEST (UTC+3)	Moore (yellow card) 18'; Denis 24'; Reginaldo (yellow card) 68'; S.Paintsil (yellow card) 90+2'	Report	Kokko 30'; Mäkitalo 63'; Yaghoubi (yellow card) 74'	Stadium: Jakobstads Centralplan; Attendance: 1,080; Referee: Jani Laaksonen

14 May 2015 7	RoPS	1 – 0	KuPS	Rovaniemi
18:30 EEST (UTC+3)	Obilor 10'; Mäkitalo (yellow card) 46'	Report	Sohna (yellow card) 31'; Pennanen (yellow card) 85'	Stadium: Keskuskenttä; Attendance: 905; Referee: Dennis Antamo

17 May 2015 8	Lahti	1 – 2	RoPS	Lahti
17:00 EEST (UTC+3)	Alves 69'	Report	Kokko 33'; Okkonen (red card) 45'; Posinković 71'; T.Hradecký (yellow card) 72'	Stadium: Lahti Stadium; Attendance: 1,558; Referee: Mattias Gestranius

20 May 2015 9	IFK Mariehamn	1 – 0	RoPS	Mariehamn
18:30 EEST (UTC+3)	Lyyski 13'; Span (yellow card) 72'	Report	Jammeh (yellow card) 78'; Saksela (yellow card) 81'; Yaghoubi (yellow card) 83'	Stadium: Wiklöf Holding Arena; Attendance: 1,021; Referee: Jani Laaksonen

29 May 2015 10	RoPS	1 – 0	VPS	Rovaniemi
18:30 EEST (UTC+3)	Jammeh (yellow card) 28'; Yaghoubi (yellow card) 80'; S.Roiha 90+1'	Report	Seabrook (yellow card) 24'; M.Viitikko (yellow card) 29' (yellow-red card) 83'; Koskimaa (yellow card) 43'	Stadium: Keskuskenttä; Attendance: 1,077; Referee: Jari Järvinen

3 June 2015 11	RoPS	4 – 0	KTP	Rovaniemi
18:30 EEST (UTC+3)	Pirinen 15' (yellow card) 71'; Saxman (yellow card) 47'; Kokko 50', 73', 81' (pen.); A.Ibiyomi (yellow card) 85'	Report	Mero (yellow card) 62'; Ikävalko (yellow card) 76'; Aspegren (yellow card) 80'	Stadium: Keskuskenttä; Attendance: 1,014; Referee: Mattias Gestranius

7 June 2015 12	SJK	0 – 1	RoPS	Seinäjoki
14:00 EEST (UTC+3)	Milosavljević (yellow card) 36'; Gogoua (yellow card) 68'; Pelvas (yellow card) 74'	Report	Mäkitalo 8'; Yaghoubi (yellow card) 22'; Obilor (yellow card) 90+3'	Stadium: Seinäjoen keskuskenttä Attendance: 1,956; Referee: Ville Nevalainen

16 June 2015 13	HIFK	1 – 1	RoPS	Helsinki
18:30 EEST (UTC+3)	Lassas 27'; Halme (yellow card) 60'; Kuusijärvi (yellow card) 65'	Report	Pirinen 47'; Yaghoubi (yellow card) 81'; Okkonen (yellow card) 89'; Obilor (yellow card) 90+4'	Stadium: Sonera Stadium; Attendance: 2,596; Referee: Marko Grönholm

22 June 2015 14	RoPS	4 – 1	Ilves	Rovaniemi
18:30 EEST (UTC+3)	Kokko 6', 21' (pen.), 57'; Pirinen 30'; T.Hradecky (yellow card) 38' (yellow-red card) 53'	Report	Lahtinen 66'	Stadium: Keskuskenttä; Attendance: 2,086; Referee: Antti Munukka

25 June 2015 15	RoPS	1 – 1	Inter Turku	Rovaniemi
18:30 EEST (UTC+3)	Yaghoubi 14'	Report	Onovo 65'	Stadium: Keskuskenttä; Attendance: 1,812; Referee: Mikko Mörö

28 June 2015 16	FF Jaro	0 – 1	RoPS	Jakobstad
18:30 EEST (UTC+3)	Rivera (yellow card) 14'; Reginaldo (yellow card) 27'; Opiyo (yellow card) 43' (yellow-red card) 63'	Report	Saksela (yellow card) 7'; Pirinen (yellow card) 55'; Saxman (yellow card) 70'; Kokko 88' (pen.)	Stadium: Jakobstads Centralplan; Attendance: 1,322; Referee: Jari Järvinen

6 July 2015 17	KTP	0 – 0	RoPS	Kotka
18:30 EEST (UTC+3)	Anttilainen (yellow card) 73'; G.Ositashvili (yellow card) 74'	Report	A.Ibiyomi (yellow card) 90'	Stadium: Arto Tolsa Areena; Attendance: 3,327; Referee: Tero Nieminen

10 July 2015 18	RoPS	2 – 1	HJK	Rovaniemi
18:30 EEST (UTC+3)	Pirinen 16'; Kokko 45+2'; Ricardo (yellow card) 54'	Report	Schüller (yellow card) 19'; Baah (yellow card) 37'; Zeneli 54' (pen.); Sorsa (yellow card) 58'	Stadium: Keskuskenttä; Attendance: 4,768; Referee: Mattias Gestranius

19 July 2015 19	VPS	1 – 1	RoPS	Vaasa
18:30 EEST (UTC+3)	Lahti 5' (yellow card) 34'; P.Soiri (yellow card) 13'; J.Voutilainen (yellow card) 49'; Ćatović (yellow card) 75'; Abdulahi (yellow card) 87'	Report	Yaghoubi 12'; Okkonen (yellow card) 90+3'	Stadium: Hietalahti Stadium; Attendance: 2,774; Referee: Jari Järvinen

26 July 2015 20	RoPS	1 – 1	IFK Mariehamn	Rovaniemi
18:30 EEST (UTC+3)	Obilor (red card) 7'; Yaghoubi (yellow card) 60'; Mäkitalo (yellow card) 70'; Kokko 90+3'	Report	Forsell 8' (pen.); Orgill (yellow card) 33'; Assis (yellow card) 68'; Dafaa (yellow card) 84'	Stadium: Keskuskenttä; Attendance: 3,021; Referee: Ville Nevalainen

2 August 2015 21	KuPS	3 – 0	RoPS	Kuopio
18:30 EEST (UTC+3)	T.Markić 10'; Diallo (yellow card) 16'; S.Savolainen 51', 67'	Report	Jammeh (yellow card) 41'; Yaghoubi (yellow card) 52'	Stadium: Kuopio Football Stadium; Attendance: 2,355; Referee: Petri Viljanen

9 August 2015 22	RoPS	1 – 2	Lahti	Rovaniemi
16:00 EEST (UTC+3)	Kokko (yellow card) 58'; Jammeh (yellow card) 64'; O.Pöyliö 86'	Report	Pasanen (yellow card) 50'; Alves 62' (pen.); Länsitalo (yellow card) 73'; Rafael 90+2'	Stadium: Keskuskenttä; Attendance: 2,461; Referee: Mikka Lähdesmäki

12 August 2015 23	RoPS	2 – 0	SJK	Rovaniemi
18:30 EEST (UTC+3)	Obilor (yellow card) 25'; Okkonen (yellow card) 81'; S.Roiha 87', 90'; Mäkitalo (yellow card) 90+1'	Report	Gogoua (yellow card) 45+2'; Dorman (yellow card) 90'	Stadium: Keskuskenttä; Attendance: 2,683; Referee: Mikko Mörö

17 August 2015 24	HIFK	1 – 1	RoPS	Helsinki
18:30 EEST (UTC+3)	Halme (yellow card) 12' (yellow-red card) 19'; Vesala (yellow card) 65'; Salmikivi 80'; Lassas (yellow card) 90+2'	Report	Yaghoubi (yellow card) 35'; T.Hradecky 48' (yellow card) 64'	Stadium: Sonera Stadium; Attendance: 3,052; Referee: Mikka Lähdesmäki

22 August 2015 25	RoPS	0 – 0	Ilves	Rovaniemi
16:00 EEST (UTC+3)	Pirinen (yellow card) 68'; Chencinski (yellow card) 81'	Report	O.Khary (yellow card) 57'; Lahtinen (yellow card) 62'; Hjelm (yellow card) 81'	Stadium: Keskuskenttä; Attendance: 2,712; Referee: Dennis Antamo

29 August 2015 26	Inter Turku	2 – 0	RoPS	Turku
16:00 EEST (UTC+3)	Matoukou (yellow card) 4'; Aho 36' (pen.); Kanakoudis (yellow card) 38'; Lehtonen 58'; P.Njoku (yellow card) 61'	Report	A.Ibiyomi (yellow card) 54'; Ramadingaye (yellow card) 88'	Stadium: Veritas Stadion; Attendance: 1,675; Referee: Mattias Gestranius

10 September 2015 27	RoPS	0 – 0	FF Jaro	Rovaniemi
18:30 EEST (UTC+3)		Report	S.Eremenko (yellow card) 57'; Silva (yellow card) 58'	Stadium: Keskuskenttä; Attendance: 3,185; Referee: Antti Munukka

14 September 2015 28	KTP	0 – 4	RoPS	Kotka
18:30 EEST (UTC+3)	Muinonen (yellow card) 26'; Oksanen (yellow card) 45+2'; Gruborovics (yellow card) 75'	Report	John 38', 80'; Saxman 45'; Kokko (yellow card) 43' (goal) 45+2' (pen.)	Stadium: Arto Tolsa Areena; Attendance: 3,106; Referee: Mikka Lähdesmäki

20 September 2015 29	HJK	0 – 2	RoPS	Helsinki
16:00 EEST (UTC+3)		Report	Yaghoubi (yellow card) 21'; Kokko 40'; Saksela (yellow card) 52'; Markkanen 71'	Stadium: Sonera Stadium; Attendance: 9,111; Referee: Dennis Antamo

27 September 2015 30	RoPS	2 – 1	VPS	Rovaniemi
18:30 EEST (UTC+3)	John 14'; Obilor 29'	Report	P.Soiri 42'; Schafer (yellow card) 74'; T.Kula (yellow card) 87'; Lahti (yellow card) 89'	Stadium: Keskuskenttä; Attendance: 3,284; Referee: Mattias Gestranius

5 October 2015 31	IFK Mariehamn	1 – 0	RoPS	Mariehamn
18:30 EEST (UTC+3)	Orgill (yellow card) 69'; Kangaskolkka 86'	Report	Okkonen (yellow card) 76'	Stadium: Wiklöf Holding Arena; Attendance: 1,096; Referee: Dennis Antamo

18 October 2015 32	RoPS	2 – 1	KuPS	Rovaniemi
14:00 EEST (UTC+3)	Yaghoubi 42'; Mäkitalo 44'	Report	H.Coulibaly (yellow card) 39'; Sohna (yellow card) 71'; U.Nissilä 87'	Stadium: Keskuskenttä; Attendance: 4,272; Referee: Dennis Antamo

25 October 2015 33	Lahti	1 – 4	RoPS	Lahti
13:00 EEST (UTC+3)	M.Kuningas (yellow card) 15'; Pasanen (yellow card) 38'; Alves (yellow card) 44' (goal) 80'; J.Tuominen (yellow card) 86'	Report	Yaghoubi 27' (yellow card) 52'; Kokko 31', 86' (pen.), 90+4' (pen.) (yellow card) 87'	Stadium: Lahti Stadium; Attendance: 3,515; Referee: Ville Nevalainen

=== Finnish Cup ===
16 April 2015 Sixth Round	Inter Turku	7 – 3	RoPS	Turku
18:30 EEST (UTC+3)	Onovo 15', 19', 45+1', 71'; Kauppi (yellow card) 44'; Matoukou 81'; Duah 85'; Belica 90+1'	Report	Lahdenmäki (yellow card) 10'; Yaghoubi 45+1'; Kokko 72', 76'	Stadium: Veritas Stadion; Attendance: 683; Referee: Petteri Kari

=== League Cup ===
==== Group stage ====
Pos	Team	Pld	W	D	L	GF	GA	GD	Pts	Qualification
1	HJK	4	1	3	0	6	4	+2	6	Knockout stage
2	RoPS	4	1	2	1	6	6	0	5	Knockout stage
3	KTP	4	0	3	1	4	6	−2	3	

Updated to match(es) played on 25 February 2015. Source: veikkausliiga.com
Rules for classification: 1) points; 2) goal difference; 3) number of goals scored; 4) head-to-head points; 5) head-to-head goal difference; 6) goals scored in head-to-head

13 February 2015 1	RoPS	0 – 2	HJK	Oulu
18:00 EET (UTC+2)		Report	A.Lehtinen (yellow card) 47'; Lod 82'; Tanaka 90+2'	Stadium: Heinäpään halli Referee: Dennis Antamo

17 February 2015 2	HJK	2 – 2	RoPS	Helsinki
17:00 EET (UTC+2)	Baah (yellow card) 56' (goal) 68'; Zeneli 89'	Report	Obilor 15' (yellow card) 68'; Saksela 20'; T.Hradecky (yellow card) 39'; L.Nurmos (yellow card) 64'; Jammeh (yellow card) 89'	Stadium: Talin halli Referee: Mikko Mörö

19 February 2015 3	KTP	2 – 2	RoPS	Kotka
16:00 EET (UTC+2)	Minkenen 35' (pen.), 73' (yellow card) 90'	Report	Ibiyomi 4', 17'; O.Pöyliö (yellow card) 77'	Stadium: Ruonalan urheiluhalli Referee: Marko Grönholm

25 February 2015 4	RoPS	2 – 0	KTP	Oulu
19:00 EET (UTC+2)	Ibiyomi 11'; Roiha 41'; Obilor (yellow card) 65'	Report	J.Mulvany (red card) 35'	Stadium: Heinäpään halli Referee: Dennis Antamo

==== Knockout stage ====
7 March 2015 Quarterfinal	SJK	2 – 2 (3 – 4 p)	RoPS	Seinäjoki
16:00 EET (UTC+2)	Gogoua (yellow card) 8'; Laaksonen (yellow card) 21'; Pelvas 45+3'; Dorman (yellow card) 51'; Vasara 85'; T.Penninkangas (yellow card) 90'	Report	Okkonen 9'; T.Hradecky (yellow card) 27'; Lahdenmäki (yellow card) 41'; Saksela 46' (yellow card) 54'; Chencinski (yellow card) 60'; Yaghoubi (yellow card) 72'	Stadium: Seinäjoen keskuskenttä Attendance: 497; Referee: Ville Nevalainen
	Penalties
	Brown (penalty missed); Pelvas (penalty scored); Atajić (penalty scored); Laaksonen (penalty missed); Gogoua (penalty scored)		(penalty scored) Okkonen; (penalty scored) Mäkitalo; (penalty scored) Yaghoubi; (penalty missed) Posinković; (penalty scored) Pirinen

14 March 2015 Semifinal	Ilves	1 – 2	RoPS	Tampere
14:30 EET (UTC+2)	Chidozie 31'; Ojanperä (yellow card) 63'; Köse (yellow card) 83'	Report	Posinković 16'; Saksela 48'; Chencinski (yellow card) 60'	Stadium: Tammela Stadion; Attendance: 800; Referee: Vesa Hätilä

4 April 2015 Final	RoPS	0 – 2	HJK	Rovaniemi
15:00 EEST (UTC+3)	Saxman (yellow card) 72'; Yaghoubi (yellow card) 73'; Obilor (yellow card) 76'	Report	Lod 9'; Moussi (yellow card) 51'; Havenaar 57' (yellow card) 76'	Stadium: Keskuskenttä; Attendance: 907; Referee: Jari Järvinen

== Squad statistics ==
As of Match played 25 October 2015

=== Appearances and goals ===
No.	Pos	Nat	Player	Total		Veikkausliiga		Finnish Cup		League Cup	
No.	Pos	Nat	Player	Apps	Goals	Apps	Goals	Apps	Goals	Apps	Goals
3	DF	(Finland) FIN	Jarkko Lahdenmäki	27	1	16+5	1	1	0	5	0
4	MF	(Finland) FIN	Antti Okkonen	37	1	30	0	1	0	6	1
5	MF	(Finland) FIN	Janne Saksela	35	3	27	1	1	0	7	2
6	MF	(Finland) FIN	Juha Pirinen	38	5	31	5	0	0	7	0
7	MF	(Finland) FIN	Mika Mäkitalo	35	3	32	3	0+1	0	1+1	0
8	MF	(Finland) FIN	Tomas Hradecky	29	1	19+2	1	1	0	7	0
9	FW	(Jamaica) JAM	Tremaine Stewart	4	0	0+4	0	0	0	0	0
10	FW	(Cameroon) CMR	Jean Fridolin Nganbe Nganbe	9	0	0+3	0	0	0	6	0
11	FW	(Finland) FIN	Aleksandr Kokko	32	19	28+1	17	0+1	2	1+1	0
12	GK	(Finland) FIN	Harri Nykänen	3	0	0+2	0	0	0	0+1	0
14	GK	(Canada) CAN	Tomer Chencinski	19	0	12	0	0	0	7	0
16	MF	(Finland) FIN	Ville Saxman	35	2	31+2	1	1	0	0+1	1
17	MF	(Finland) FIN	Olli Pöyliö	15	1	1+11	1	0	0	1+2	0
19	MF	(United States) USA	Will John	11	3	10+1	3	0	0	0	0
20	FW	(Finland) FIN	Simo Roiha	28	4	6+15	3	0+1	0	3+3	1
21	FW	(Finland) FIN	Tommi Haanpää	11	0	2+5	0	0	0	0+4	0
22	GK	(Brazil) BRA	Ricardo	17	0	17	0	0	0	0	0
26	FW	(Finland) FIN	Eero Markkanen	6	1	0+6	1	0	0	0	0
32	MF	(Finland) FIN	David Ramadingaye	4	0	0+4	0	0	0	0	0
35	FW	(Nigeria) NGR	Adeniyi Michael Ibiyomi	31	4	7+16	1	1	0	6+1	3
77	MF	(Finland) FIN	Moshtagh Yaghoubi	33	5	26+4	4	1	1	0+2	0
80	DF	(Nigeria) NGR	Faith Friday Obilor	38	3	30	2	1	0	7	1
86	DF	(The Gambia) GAM	Abdou Jammeh	38	0	30	0	1	0	7	0
Trialist:
9	FW	(Cameroon) CMR	Anicet Eyenga	1	0	0	0	0	0	1	0
24	FW	(Liberia) LBR	Andreas Blamon	1	0	0	0	0	0	0+1	0
Players from Santa Claus who appeared:
18	MF	(Finland) FIN	Juuso Majava	1	0	0	0	0	0	0+1	0
19	DF	(Finland) FIN	Juho Sieppi	1	0	0	0	0	0	0+1	0
22	FW	(Finland) FIN	Ali Hajizadeh	1	0	0	0	0	0	1	0
24	MF	(Finland) FIN	Iiro Vanha	1	0	0	0	0	0	0+1	0
Players who left RoPS during the season:
1	GK	(Finland) FIN	Ville Iiskola	5	0	4	0	1	0	0	0
2	DF	(Finland) FIN	Lassi Nurmos	3	0	0	0	0	0	1+2	0
91	FW	(Croatia) CRO	Vilim Posinković	17	2	4+9	1	1	0	3	1

=== Goal scorers ===
Place	Position	Nation	Number	Name	Veikkausliiga	Finnish Cup	League Cup	Total
1	FW	(Finland)	11	Aleksandr Kokko	17	2	0	19
2	DF	(Finland)	6	Juha Pirinen	5	0	0	5
2	MF	(Finland)	77	Moshtagh Yaghoubi	4	1	0	5
4	FW	(Finland)	20	Simo Roiha	3	0	1	4
4	FW	(Nigeria)	35	Adeniyi Michael Ibiyomi	1	0	3	4
6	FW	(United States)	19	Will John	3	0	0	3
6	MF	(Finland)	7	Mika Mäkitalo	3	0	0	3
6	DF	(Nigeria)	80	Faith Friday Obilor	2	0	1	3
6	DF	(Finland)	5	Janne Saksela	1	0	2	3
10	FW	(Croatia)	91	Vilim Posinković	1	0	1	2
11	MF	(Finland)	8	Tomas Hradecky	1	0	0	1
11	MF	(Finland)	17	Olli Pöyliö	1	0	0	1
11	DF	(Finland)	3	Jarkko Lahdenmäki	1	0	0	1
11	FW	(Finland)	26	Eero Markkanen	1	0	0	1
11	MF	(Finland)	16	Ville Saxman	1	0	1	1
11	MF	(Finland)	4	Antti Okkonen	0	0	1	1
TOTALS					44	3	10	57

=== Disciplinary record ===
Number	Nation	Position	Name	Veikkausliiga		Finnish Cup		League Cup		Total	
Number	Nation	Position	Name	Yellow card	Red card	Yellow card	Red card	Yellow card	Red card	Yellow card	Red card
2	(Finland)	DF	Lassi Nurmos	0	0	0	0	1	0	1	0
3	(Finland)	DF	Jarkko Lahdenmäki	1	0	1	0	1	0	3	0
4	(Finland)	MF	Antti Okkonen	5	1	0	0	0	0	6	1
5	(Finland)	MF	Janne Saksela	4	0	0	0	1	0	5	0
6	(Finland)	MF	Juha Pirinen	4	0	0	0	0	0	4	0
7	(Finland)	MF	Mika Mäkitalo	3	0	0	0	0	0	3	0
8	(Finland)	MF	Tomas Hradecky	4	1	0	0	2	0	6	1
11	(Finland)	FW	Aleksandr Kokko	6	0	0	0	0	0	6	0
14	(Canada)	GK	Tomer Chencinski	1	0	0	0	2	0	3	0
16	(Finland)	MF	Ville Saxman	3	0	0	0	1	0	4	0
17	(Finland)	MF	Olli Pöyliö	0	0	0	0	1	0	1	0
32	(Finland)	MF	David Ramadingaye	1	0	0	0	0	0	1	0
35	(Nigeria)	FW	Adeniyi Michael Ibiyomi	3	0	0	0	0	0	3	0
44	(Brazil)	GK	Ricardo	1	0	0	0	0	0	1	0
77	(Finland)	MF	Moshtagh Yaghoubi	11	0	0	0	2	0	13	0
80	(Nigeria)	DF	Faith Friday Obilor	4	1	0	0	3	0	7	1
86	(The Gambia)	DF	Abdou Jammeh	4	0	0	0	1	0	5	0
TOTALS				55	3	1	0	15	0	71	3
