= 2016 RoPS season =

RoPS
2016 season
- Chairman: Risto Niva
- Manager: Juha Malinen
- Stadium: Keskuskenttä
- Veikkausliiga: 6th'
- Finnish Cup: Sixth Round vs Haka
- League Cup: Group Stage
- UEFA Europa League: Second qualifying round vs Lokomotiva
- Top goalscorer: League: Robert Taylor (11); All: Aleksandr Kokko (13)
Home colours	Away colours

The 2016 season is RoPS's 4th Veikkausliiga season since their promotion back to the top flight in 2012.

== Squad ==
As of 4 September 2016

Note: Flags indicate national team as defined under FIFA eligibility rules; some limited exceptions apply. Players may hold more than one non-FIFA nationality.

No.	Pos.	Nation	Player
1	GK	USA	Tyler Back
3	DF	FIN	Jarkko Lahdenmäki
4	MF	FIN	Antti Okkonen (captain)
5	DF	FIN	Janne Saksela
6	MF	FIN	Juha Pirinen
7	MF	FIN	Mika Mäkitalo
8	MF	FIN	Robert Taylor
10	FW	CMR	Jean Fridolin Nganbe Nganbe
12	GK	FIN	Juhani Kangas
13	DF	FIN	Lassi Järvenpää (loan from HJK)
14	MF	FIN	Eetu Muinonen
16	DF	FIN	Ville Saxman

No.	Pos.	Nation	Player
17	MF	GAM	Mamut Saine
19	FW	GHA	Ransford Osei
20	FW	FIN	Simo Roiha
21	MF	FIN	Aapo Heikkilä
22	GK	BRA	Ricardo
23	MF	SVK	Michal Mravec
25	GK	ESP	Antonio Reguero
47	DF	FIN	Juuso Hämäläinen
77	MF	ESP	José Galán
85	FW	USA	Will John
86	DF	GAM	Abdou Jammeh
99	FW	EST	Albert Prosa

=== Out on loan ===
Note: Flags indicate national team as defined under FIFA eligibility rules; some limited exceptions apply. Players may hold more than one non-FIFA nationality.

No.	Pos.	Nation	Player
2	DF	FIN	Akseli Kalermo (at AC Oulu)

== Transfers ==
=== Winter ===
In: Note: Flags indicate national team as defined under FIFA eligibility rules; some limited exceptions apply. Players may hold more than one non-FIFA nationality.

No.	Pos.	Nation	Player
1	GK	USA	Tyler Back
8	MF	FIN	Robert Taylor (from (Finland) JJK)
14	MF	FIN	Eetu Muinonen (from (Finland) KTP)
17	MF	GAM	Mamut Saine (from (Greece) Chania)
19	FW	GHA	Ransford Osei
21	FW	FIN	Aapo Heikkilä (from (Finland) Oulu)
23	MF	SVK	Michal Mravec (from (United States) Atlanta Silverbacks)
25	GK	ESP	Antonio Reguero
47	DF	FIN	Juuso Hämäläinen (from (Finland) Inter Turku)
—	MF	GER	Nahom Gebru (Trial)
—	FW	CMR	Yves Robert Chouake (Trial)

Out: Note: Flags indicate national team as defined under FIFA eligibility rules; some limited exceptions apply. Players may hold more than one non-FIFA nationality.

No.	Pos.	Nation	Player
8	MF	FIN	Tomas Hradecky
9	FW	JAM	Tremaine Stewart (to (Jamaica) Portmore United)
12	GK	FIN	Harri Nykänen
14	GK	CAN	Tomer Chencinski (to (Sweden) Helsingborg)
17	MF	FIN	Olli Pöyliö
21	MF	FIN	Tommi Haanpää
26	FW	FIN	Eero Markkanen (to (Sweden) AIK)
32	MF	FIN	David Ramadingaye (to (Finland) PK-35 Vantaa)
35	FW	NGR	Adeniyi Michael Ibiyomi (to (Finland) Kajaani)
77	MF	FIN	Moshtagh Yaghoubi (to (Latvia) Spartaks Jūrmala)
80	DF	NGR	Faith Friday Obilor (to (Finland) Inter Turku)

=== Summer ===
In: Note: Flags indicate national team as defined under FIFA eligibility rules; some limited exceptions apply. Players may hold more than one non-FIFA nationality.

No.	Pos.	Nation	Player
13	DF	FIN	Lassi Järvenpää (loan from (Finland) HJK)
77	MF	ESP	José Galán (from (Indonesia) Persela Lamongan)
99	FW	EST	Albert Prosa (from (Estonia) Flora)

Out: Note: Flags indicate national team as defined under FIFA eligibility rules; some limited exceptions apply. Players may hold more than one non-FIFA nationality.

No.	Pos.	Nation	Player
11	FW	FIN	Aleksandr Kokko (to (Australia) Newcastle Jets)

== Competitions ==
=== Veikkausliiga ===
==== League table ====
Pos	Team	Pld	W	D	L	GF	GA	GD	Pts	Qualification or relegation
4	VPS	33	15	8	10	36	27	+9	53	Qualification for the Europa League first qualifying round (Note: SJK qualified for the Europa League first qualifying round by winning the 2016 Finnish Cup.)
5	Ilves	33	15	7	11	36	35	+1	52	
6	RoPS	33	13	11	9	43	33	+10	50	
7	KuPS	33	14	7	12	37	31	+6	49	
8	Lahti	33	10	12	11	42	43	−1	42	

Source: Veikkausliiga (in Finnish), Soccerway
Rules for classification: 1) Points; 2) Goal difference; 3) Goals scored; 4) Head-to-head points; 5) Head-to-head goal difference; 6) Head-to-head away goals scored; 7) Play-off
(Note: Play-off is only played if need to decide champion, teams for relegation or UEFA competition and will be played on a neutral ground).

==== Results summary ====
Overall								Home						Away					
Pld	W	D	L	GF	GA	GD	Pts	W	D	L	GF	GA	GD	W	D	L	GF	GA	GD
33	13	11	9	42	33	+9	50	9	6	1	23	9	+14	4	5	8	19	24	−5

Last updated: 24 October 2016.
Source: See Results

==== Results by matchday ====
Round	1	2	3	4	5	6	7	8	9	10	11	12	13	14	15	16	17	18	19	20	21	22	23	24	25	26	27	28	29	30	31	32	33
Ground	A	A	H	H	A	H	A	A	A	H	H	A	H	A	H	A	H	A	H	H	A	A	A	H	A	H	H	A	H	A	H	A	H
Result	W	L	D	W	W	D	D	L	L	L	D	D	W	W	W	W	W	D	W	W	L	L	D	W	L	D	W	L	D	L	W	D	D

Updated to match(es) played on 24 October 2016. Source: See results
A = Away; H = Home; W = Win; D = Draw; L = Loss

==== Results ====
2 April 2016 1	PK-35	3 – 4	RoPS	Vantaa
17:00 EEST (UTC+3)	Kuqi 22', 49'; Ristola 28'; Heimonen (yellow card) 47'	Report	A.Heikkilä 52'; Nganbe (yellow card) 61'; Taylor 67'; Saxman (yellow card) 68' (goal) 76'; Kokko 79' (yellow card) 81'	Stadium: ISS Stadion; Attendance: 2,415; Referee: Mattias Gestranius

9 April 2016 2	IFK Mariehamn	1 – 0	RoPS	Mariehamn
16:00 EEST (UTC+3)	Wirtanen (yellow card) 43'; Sid (yellow card) 48'; Orgill 53'	Report	J.Saksela (yellow card) 17'	Stadium: Wiklöf Holding Arena; Attendance: 1,146; Referee: Petri Viljanen

14 April 2016 3	RoPS	2 – 2	HJK	Rovaniemi
18:30 EEST (UTC+3)	Jammeh (yellow card) 20'; Kokko 27' (yellow card) 78'; John 37' (yellow card) 69'; Pirinen (yellow card) 78'	Report	Morelos 10', 41'; Medo (yellow card) 16'; Sorsa (yellow card) 31'	Stadium: Rovaniemen keskuskenttä Attendance: 2,475; Referee: Dennis Antamo

24 April 2016 4	RoPS	1 – 0	PK-35 Vantaa	Rovaniemi
16:00 EEST (UTC+3)	Kokko 90+2'	Report	F.Liñan (yellow card) 18'; Xhaferi (yellow card) 34'	Stadium: Rovaniemen keskuskenttä Attendance: 1,785; Referee: Antti Munukka

28 April 2016 5	Inter Turku	1 – 2	RoPS	Turku
18:30 EEST (UTC+3)	Nwanganga 43'	Report	Taylor 30'; Kokko 68'; Saksela (yellow card) 78'	Stadium: Veritas Stadion; Attendance: 1,815; Referee: Mattias Gestranius

5 May 2016 6	RoPS	0 – 0	Lahti	Rovaniemi
14:00 EEST (UTC+3)	Jammeh (yellow card) 73'; Kokko (yellow card) 74'	Report	Tanska (yellow card) 9' (yellow-red card) 17'; Solovyov (red card) 65'	Stadium: Rovaniemen keskuskenttä Attendance: 2,412

9 May 2016 7	HIFK	1 – 1	RoPS	Helsinki
18:00 EEST (UTC+3)	Korhonen 12'; Vesala (yellow card) 68'	Report	Saxman 51'; J.Saksela (yellow card) 65'; Mäkitalo (yellow card) 84'	Stadium: Sonera Stadium; Attendance: 2,649; Referee: Jari Järvinen

13 May 2016 8	RoPS	0 – 1	KuPS	Rovaniemi
18:30 EEST (UTC+3)		Report	Pennanen (yellow card) 86'; Egwuekwe 89'	Stadium: Rovaniemen keskuskenttä Attendance: 932; Referee: Dennis Antamo

22 May 2016 9	VPS	1 – 0	RoPS	Vaasa
18:30 EEST (UTC+3)	P.Soiri 45+1'; Clennon (yellow card) 82'	Report		Stadium: Hietalahti Stadium; Attendance: 1,268; Referee: Kalle Mäkinen

28 May 2016 10	RoPS	2 – 3	SJK	Rovaniemi
16:00 EEST (UTC+3)	Taylor 13'; Osei 66'	Report	Méïté (yellow card) 35' (goal) 85'; T.Penninkangas (yellow card) 58'; Riski 64'; Ngueukam (yellow card) 69' (goal) 79'; Laaksonen (yellow card) 90+2'	Stadium: Rovaniemen keskuskenttä Attendance: 2,344; Referee: Mikko Mörö

9 June 2016 11	RoPS	0 – 0	IFK Mariehamn	Rovaniemi
18:30 EEST (UTC+3)	Kokko (yellow card) 41'; Saxman (yellow card) 63'; J.Hämäläinen (yellow card) 90+2'	Report	Mäkinen (yellow card) 89'	Stadium: Rovaniemen keskuskenttä Attendance: 1,276; Referee: Dennis Antamo

12 June 2016 12	HJK	1 – 1	RoPS	Helsinki
13:30 EEST (UTC+3)	Oduamadi (yellow card) 24'; Gadze (yellow card) 41'; Taiwo 50' (pen.); Rexhepi (yellow card) 90+5'	Report	Jammeh (yellow card) 18'; Mravec (yellow card) 48'; Nganbe (yellow card) 71'; John 75'	Stadium: Sonera Stadium; Attendance: 3,102; Referee: Petri Viljanen

18 June 2016 13	RoPS	1 – 0	Ilves	Rovaniemi
13:30 EEST (UTC+3)	Taylor 10'; Nganbe (yellow card) 27'; Pirinen (yellow card) 54'	Report	Ala-Myllymäki (yellow card) 64'; Ayarna (yellow card) 71'; Miettunen (yellow card) 75'	Stadium: Rovaniemen keskuskenttä Attendance: 1,556; Referee: Toni Pohjoismäki

23 June 2016 14	PS Kemi	0 – 2	RoPS	Kemi
17:30 EEST (UTC+3)	D.Bitsindou (yellow card) 31'	Report	J.Hämäläinen (yellow card) 47'; Muinonen 56'; Mravec (yellow card) 65' (goal) 70'; Reguero (yellow card) 90+1'	Stadium: Sauvosaaren Urheilupuisto; Attendance: 3,976; Referee: Jari Järvinen

10 July 2016 15	RoPS	2 – 1	Inter Turku	Rovaniemi
17:00 EEST (UTC+3)	Kokko 8', 45'	Report	Duah 26'; Mannström (yellow card) 49'; Kanakoudis (yellow card) 84'	Stadium: Rovaniemen keskuskenttä Attendance: 1,641; Referee: Jani Laaksonen

17 July 2016 16	Lahti	1 – 2	RoPS	Lahti
18:30 EEST (UTC+3)	Tammilehto (yellow card) 38'; Länsitalo 48' (yellow card) 77'	Report	Taylor 3'; Mäkitalo (yellow card) 74' (goal) 85'; J.Hämäläinen (yellow card) 78'; Pirinen (yellow card) 88'; M.Saine (yellow card) 90+1'	Stadium: Lahti Stadium; Attendance: 1,887; Referee: Antti Munukka

24 July 2016 17	RoPS	1 – 0	HIFK	Rovaniemi
18:30 EEST (UTC+3)	Taylor 38' (pen.); Pirinen (yellow card) 86'	Report	Gela (yellow card) 75'	Stadium: Rovaniemen keskuskenttä Attendance: 2,011; Referee: Petri Viljanen

31 July 2016 18	KuPS	1 – 1	RoPS	Kuopio
18:30 EEST (UTC+3)	Ääritalo 53'; Salami (yellow card) 58'; Pennanen (yellow card) 82'; S.Savolainen (yellow card) 88'	Report	Kokko 11'; J.Saksela (yellow card) 31'; Okkonen (yellow card) 88'	Stadium: Kuopio Football Stadium; Attendance: 2,390; Referee: Antti Munukka

7 August 2016 19	RoPS	2 – 0	VPS	Rovaniemi
18:30 EEST (UTC+3)	Taylor 8'; Kokko 11'; J.Hämäläinen (yellow card) 35'; Okkonen (yellow card) 86'	Report	J.Levänen (yellow card) 87'	Stadium: Rovaniemen keskuskenttä Attendance: 1,777; Referee: Jani Laaksonen

10 August 2016 20	RoPS	5 – 0	PS Kemi	Rovaniemi
18:30 EEST (UTC+3)	Taylor 22', 45', 56'; Kokko 32'; Mravec 34'; Reguero (yellow card) 73'	Report		Stadium: Rovaniemen keskuskenttä Attendance: 3,024; Referee: Antti Munukka

13 August 2016 21	SJK	3 – 1	RoPS	Seinäjoki
16:00 EEST (UTC+3)	Dorman 4' (yellow card) 64'; Vasara 45+3', 71'; T.Penninkangas (yellow card) 77'	Report	Muinonen 45+2'; Mravec (yellow card) 58'	Stadium: OmaSP Stadion; Attendance: 3,675; Referee: Kalle Mäkinen

20 August 2016 22	PS Kemi	3 – 1	RoPS	Turku
16:00 EEST (UTC+3)	Törnros 48', 59'; Z.Savić 66'; Veteli (yellow card) 74'; Kaby (yellow card) 77'	Report	J.Hämäläinen (yellow card) 38'; Prosa 65'	Stadium: Veritas Stadion; Attendance: 2,273; Referee: Dennis Antamo

24 August 2016 23	Ilves	1 – 1	RoPS	Tampere
18:30 EEST (UTC+3)	Matrone (yellow card) 32'; Soisalo 42' (pen.)	Report	Matrone 23' (o.g.); Jammeh (yellow card) 42' (yellow-red card) 80'; J.Saksela (yellow card) 54'; Prosa (yellow card) 78'	Stadium: Tammelan Stadion; Attendance: 2,616; Referee: Marko Grönholm

27 August 2016 24	RoPS	3 – 0	Lahti	Rovaniemi
16:00 EEST (UTC+3)	Nganbe 4', 32'; M.Saine 18'	Report	Hauhia (yellow card) 55'; Länsitalo (yellow card) 61'	Stadium: Rovaniemen keskuskenttä

9 September 2016 25	Ilves	2 – 1	RoPS	Tampere
18:30 EEST (UTC+3)	Ala-Myllymäki 32'; Tendeng 65'	Report	M.Saine (yellow card) 15'; Lahdenmäki 54'; Okkonen (yellow card) 56'; Mäkitalo (yellow card) 70'	Stadium: Tammelan Stadion; Attendance: 2,915; Referee: Petri Viljanen

12 September 2016 26	RoPS	1 – 1	SJK	Rovaniemi
18:30 EEST (UTC+3)	Taylor 73' (pen.); Prosa (yellow card) 88'	Report	Ions 90'; Aimar (yellow card) 90+3'	Stadium: Rovaniemen keskuskenttä Attendance: 1,710; Referee: Marko Grönholm

16 September 2016 27	RoPS	1 – 0	PK-35	Rovaniemi
18:30 EEST (UTC+3)	Galán (yellow card) 35' (yellow-red card) 85'; Jammeh (yellow card) 56'; Pirinen 63' (pen.)	Report	L.Väisänen (yellow card) 28'; Olatuga (yellow card) 62'	Stadium: Rovaniemen keskuskenttä Attendance: 1,323; Referee: Jari Järvinen

21 September 2016 28	HJK	2 – 1	RoPS	Helsinki
18:30 EEST (UTC+3)	Morelos 45+1'; Pelvas 84' (pen.)	Report	Pirinen (yellow card) 24'; Muinonen 34'; Saksela (yellow card) 37'; Lahdenmäki (yellow card) 51'; Jammeh (yellow card) 84'	Stadium: Sonera Stadium; Attendance: 5,142; Referee: Marko Grönholm

25 September 2016 29	RoPS	1 – 1	IFK Mariehamn	Rovaniemi
18:30 EEST (UTC+3)	Saksela 35'; Jammeh (yellow card) 42'; J.Hämäläinen (yellow card) 90+3'	Report	Assis 2' (yellow card) 79'; Span (yellow card) 28'	Stadium: Rovaniemen keskuskenttä Attendance: 1,933; Referee: Antti Munukka

2 October 2016 30	VPS	1 – 0	RoPS	Vaasa
18:30 EEST (UTC+3)	Lähde (yellow card) 62'; P.Soiri 82'; J.Voutilainen (yellow card) 90+3'	Report	Nganbe (yellow card) 17'	Stadium: Hietalahti Stadium; Attendance: 2,472; Referee: Ville Nevalainen

14 October 2016 31	RoPS	2 – 1	KuPS	Rovaniemi
18:30 EEST (UTC+3)	Prosa 30'; Lahdenmäki 42'; Galán (yellow card) 75'; J.Hämäläinen (yellow card) 84'	Report	Salami 25'; J.Lautamaja (yellow card) 74'	Stadium: Rovaniemen keskuskenttä Attendance: 1,359; Referee: Toni Pohjoismäki

17 October 2016 32	Inter Turku	1 – 1	RoPS	Turku
18:30 EEST (UTC+3)	Kuqi 72'	Report	Saksela 62'; J..Hämäläinen (yellow card) 90+1'	Stadium: Veritas Stadion; Attendance: 2,036; Referee: Petri Viljanen

23 October 2016 33	RoPS	0 – 0	HIFK	Rovaniemi
15:00 EEST (UTC+3)	Mäkitalo (yellow card) 27'; Ricardo (yellow card) 54'	Report	Mäkelä (yellow card) 25'; Ristola (yellow card) 76'; Gela (yellow card) 87'	Stadium: Rovaniemen keskuskenttä Attendance: 1,285; Referee: Kalle Mäkinen

=== Finnish Cup ===
29 March 2016 Fifth Round	Hercules	0 – 8	RoPS	Oulu
18:30 EEST (UTC+3)	N.Ruokangas (yellow card) 32'; M.Huoponen (yellow card) 64'	Report	Taylor 5'; Kokko 11', 13', 29'; John 58'; Mravec (yellow card) 69'; Jammeh 74'; Nganbe 80'; A.Heikkilä 85'	Stadium: Heinäpään jalkapallohalli Attendance: 350; Referee: Daniel Enkvist

20 April 2016 Sixth Round	FC Haka	4 – 1	RoPS	Valkeakoski
17:30 EEST (UTC+3)	Ahonen 41'; Järvi 70', 75' (yellow card) 90'; James (yellow card) 79'; Dudu 84'	Report	Nganbe (yellow card) 32'; Kokko 66'; Jammeh (yellow card) 67'	Stadium: Tehtaan kenttä Attendance: 788; Referee: Petri Viljanen

=== League Cup ===
Pos	Team	Pld	W	D	L	GF	GA	GD	Pts	Qualification
1	SJK	5	4	1	0	6	2	+4	13	Final
2	PS Kemi	5	2	1	2	6	5	+1	7	
3	VPS	5	2	1	2	4	4	0	7	
4	RoPS	5	1	3	1	4	3	+1	6	
5	Ilves	5	1	1	3	3	6	−3	4	
6	KuPS	5	1	1	3	3	6	−3	4	

Updated to match(es) played on 27 February 2015. Source: veikkausliiga.com
Rules for classification: 1) points; 2) goal difference; 3) number of goals scored; 4) head-to-head points; 5) head-to-head goal difference; 6) goals scored in head-to-head

30 January 2016 1	RoPS	0 – 0	VPS	Oulu
14:00 EET (UTC+2)	Okkonen (yellow card) 85'	Report	Tiodorović (yellow card) 84'	Stadium: Heinäpään nurmi Attendance: 210; Referee: Dennis Antamo

4 February 2016 2	RoPS	2 – 0	KuPS	Oulu
18:00 EET (UTC+2)	Malcolm 10'; Jammeh (yellow card) 41'; T.Back (yellow card) 57'; Okkonen (yellow card) 72'; Heikkilä 90'	Report	Poutiainen (yellow card) 47'; H.Coulibaly (yellow card) 90+2'	Stadium: Heinäpään nurmi Attendance: 204; Referee: Petri Viljanen

10 February 2016 3	Ilves	0 – 0	RoPS	Tampere
18:00 EET (UTC+2)	Matrone (yellow card) 52'; Lahtinen (yellow card) 59'; Miettunen (yellow card) 70'; Petrescu (yellow card) 90+1'	Report	Okkonen (yellow card) 62'	Stadium: Pirkkahalli Arena; Attendance: 550; Referee: Mikko Mörö

16 February 2016 4	PS Kemi Kings	1 – 1	RoPS	Kemi
18:00 EET (UTC+2)	Ions 4'; Turpeenniemi (yellow card) 45+3'	Report	Muinonen 21'; J.Majava (yellow card) 49'	Stadium: Junkohalli Kemi; Referee: Antti Munukka

27 February 2016 5	RoPS	1 – 2	SJK	Oulu
15:00 EET (UTC+2)	M.Saine (yellow card) 21'; J.Hämäläinen (red card) 26'; Okkonen 50' (yellow card) 76'; Pirinen (yellow card) 88'	Report	Riski 27' (pen.), 32'	Stadium: Heinäpään nurmi Attendance: 253; Referee: Ville Nevalainen

=== UEFA Europa League ===
==== Qualifying rounds ====
30 June 2016 First qualifying round 1st leg	Shamrock Rovers (Republic of Ireland)	0 – 2	(Finland) RoPS	Dublin, Republic of Ireland
22:00 EEST (UTC+3)		Report	Lahdenmäki 27'; M.Saine (yellow card) 40'; Mravec (yellow card) 62'; Nganbe (yellow card) 63'; Saksela 74'	Stadium: Tallaght Stadium; Attendance: 1,908; Referee: Georgios Kominis (Greece)

7 July 2016 First qualifying round 2nd leg	RoPS (Finland)	1 – 1 (3 – 1 agg.)	(Republic of Ireland) Shamrock Rovers	Rovaniemi, Finland
19:00 EEST (UTC+3)	Pirinen (yellow card) 22'; Muinonen 26'; Mravec (yellow card) 53'; Nganbe (yellow card) 65'; Kokko 72'; Reguero (yellow card) 80'	Report	McCabe 22' (pen.); Cregg (yellow card) 61'	Stadium: Rovaniemen keskuskenttä Attendance: 1,525; Referee: Dejan Jakimovski (Macedonia)

14 July 2016 Second qualifying round 1st leg	RoPS (Finland)	1 – 1	(Croatia) Lokomotiva	Rovaniemi, Finland
19:00 EEST (UTC+3)	Pirinen (yellow card) 25'; Jammeh 87'	Report	Capan (yellow card) 35'; Jammeh 73' (o.g.); Prenga (yellow card) 80'	Stadium: Rovaniemen keskuskenttä Attendance: 1,812; Referee: Þorvaldur Árnason (Iceland)

21 July 2016 Second qualifying round 2nd leg	Lokomotiva (Croatia)	3 – 0 (4 – 1 agg.)	(Finland) RoPS	Zagreb, Croatia
19:00 EEST (UTC+3)	Prenga (yellow card) 36'; Fiolić 44'; Marić 49', 83'; Capan (yellow card) 67'	Report	Pirinen (yellow card) 22' (yellow-red card) 35'; Jammeh (yellow card) 49' (yellow-red card) 90'; Mravec (yellow card) 74'	Stadium: Stadion Kranjčevićeva; Referee: Giorgi Kruashvili (Georgia)

== Squad statistics ==
As of Match played 23 October 2016

=== Appearances and goals ===
No.	Pos	Nat	Player	Total		Veikkausliiga		Finnish Cup		League Cup		Europa League	
No.	Pos	Nat	Player	Apps	Goals	Apps	Goals	Apps	Goals	Apps	Goals	Apps	Goals
1	GK	(United States) USA	Tyler Back	3	0	0	0	0	0	2+1	0	0	0
2	DF	(Finland) FIN	Akseli Kalermo	11	0	4+2	0	0+1	0	3+1	0	0	0
3	DF	(Finland) FIN	Jarkko Lahdenmäki	31	3	21+4	2	1+1	0	0+1	0	2+1	1
4	MF	(Finland) FIN	Antti Okkonen	24	1	15+1	0	1	0	5	1	0+2	0
5	DF	(Finland) FIN	Janne Saksela	35	3	30	2	1	0	0	0	4	1
6	MF	(Finland) FIN	Juha Pirinen	41	1	30+1	1	2	0	4	0	4	0
7	MF	(Finland) FIN	Mika Mäkitalo	35	1	22+4	1	2	0	4	0	1+2	0
8	MF	(Finland) FIN	Robert Taylor	42	12	30+1	11	2	1	4+1	0	4	0
10	FW	(Cameroon) CMR	Jean Fridolin Nganbe Nganbe	33	3	17+8	2	1+1	1	0+2	0	2+2	0
12	GK	(Finland) FIN	Juhani Kangas	1	0	0	0	0+1	0	0	0	0	0
13	DF	(Finland) FIN	Lassi Järvenpää	6	0	6	0	0	0	0	0	0	0
14	MF	(Finland) FIN	Eetu Muinonen	31	5	15+9	3	0	0	1+2	1	3+1	1
15	FW	(Finland) FIN	Jarkko Luiro	4	0	0+1	0	0	0	0+3	0	0	0
16	MF	(Finland) FIN	Ville Saxman	23	2	14+3	2	2	0	3+1	0	0	0
17	MF	(The Gambia) GAM	Mamut Saine	20	1	7+10	1	0	0	1	0	2	0
18	MF	(Finland) FIN	Juho Hyvärinen	1	0	0+1	0	0	0	0	0	0	0
19	FW	(Ghana) GHA	Ransford Osei	20	1	4+12	1	1	0	2	0	0+1	0
20	FW	(Finland) FIN	Simo Roiha	1	0	1	0	0	0	0	0	0	0
21	FW	(Finland) FIN	Aapo Heikkilä	27	3	5+14	1	1+1	1	5	1	0+1	0
22	GK	(Brazil) BRA	Ricardo	19	0	14	0	2	0	3	0	0	0
23	MF	(Slovakia) SVK	Michal Mravec	22	2	11+6	2	0+1	0	0	0	4	0
25	GK	(Spain) ESP	Antonio Reguero	23	0	19	0	0	0	0	0	4	0
47	DF	(Finland) FIN	Juuso Hämäläinen	36	0	27	0	1	0	4	0	4	0
77	MF	(Spain) ESP	José Galán	6	0	4+2	0	0	0	0	0	0	0
85	FW	(United States) USA	Will John	33	3	15+12	2	2	1	0	0	4	0
86	DF	(The Gambia) GAM	Abdou Jammeh	42	2	31	0	2	1	5	0	4	1
99	FW	(Estonia) EST	Albert Prosa	9	2	6+3	2	0	0	0	0	0	0
Trialists:
15	MF	(Finland) FIN	Juho Hyvärinen	2	0	0	0	0	0	0+2	0	0	0
18	MF	(Germany) GER	Nahom Gebru	2	0	0	0	0	0	2	0	0	0
19	MF	(Guam) GUM	Shane Malcolm	3	1	0	0	0	0	3	1	0	0
22	FW	(Russia) RUS	Artyom Katashevsky	2	0	0	0	0	0	2	0	0	0
47	MF	(Finland) FIN	Juuso Majava	1	0	0	0	0	0	1	0	0	0
Players who left RoPS during the season:
11	FW	(Finland) FIN	Aleksandr Kokko	23	13	14+1	9	1+1	4	1+1	0	2+2	0

=== Goal scorers ===
Place	Position	Nation	Number	Name	Veikkausliiga	Finnish Cup	League Cup	Europa League	Total
1	FW	(Finland)	11	Aleksandr Kokko	9	4	0	0	13
2	MF	(Finland)	8	Robert Taylor	11	1	0	0	12
3	MF	(Finland)	14	Eetu Muinonen	3	0	1	1	5
4	FW	(Finland)	21	Aapo Heikkilä	1	1	1	0	3
4	FW	(United States)	85	Will John	2	1	0	0	3
4	MF	(Cameroon)	10	Jean Fridolin Nganbe Nganbe	2	1	0	0	3
4	DF	(Finland)	3	Jarkko Lahdenmäki	2	0	0	1	3
4	DF	(Finland)	5	Janne Saksela	2	0	0	1	3
9	DF	(Finland)	16	Ville Saxman	2	0	0	0	2
9	MF	(Slovakia)	23	Michal Mravec	2	0	0	0	2
9	FW	(Estonia)	99	Albert Prosa	2	0	0	0	2
9	DF	(The Gambia)	86	Abdou Jammeh	0	1	0	1	2
13	FW	(Ghana)	19	Ransford Osei	1	0	0	0	1
13	MF	(Finland)	7	Mika Mäkitalo	1	0	0	0	1
13	MF	(The Gambia)	17	Mamut Saine	1	0	0	0	1
13	MF	(Finland)	6	Juha Pirinen	1	0	0	0	1
13	MF	(Guam)	19	Shane Malcolm	0	0	1	0	1
13	MF	(Finland)	4	Antti Okkonen	0	0	1	0	1
13				Own goal	1	0	0	0	1
TOTALS					42	8	4	4	58

=== Disciplinary record ===
Number	Nation	Position	Name	Veikkausliiga		Finnish Cup		League Cup		Europa League		Total	
Number	Nation	Position	Name	Yellow card	Red card	Yellow card	Red card	Yellow card	Red card	Yellow card	Red card	Yellow card	Red card
1	(United States)	GK	Tyler Back	0	0	0	0	1	0	0	0	1	0
3	(Finland)	DF	Jarkko Lahdenmäki	0	0	0	0	1	0	0	0	1	0
4	(Finland)	MF	Antti Okkonen	3	0	0	0	4	0	0	0	7	0
5	(Finland)	DF	Janne Saksela	6	0	0	0	0	0	0	0	6	0
6	(Finland)	DF	Juha Pirinen	5	0	0	0	1	0	4	1	10	1
7	(Finland)	MF	Mika Mäkitalo	4	0	0	0	0	0	0	0	4	0
10	(Cameroon)	FW	Jean Fridolin Nganbe Nganbe	4	0	1	0	0	0	2	0	7	0
11	(Finland)	FW	Aleksandr Kokko	4	0	0	0	0	0	1	0	5	0
16	(Finland)	DF	Ville Saxman	2	0	0	0	0	0	0	0	2	0
17	(The Gambia)	MF	Mamut Saine	2	0	0	0	1	0	1	0	4	0
18	(Finland)	MF	Juuso Majava	0	0	0	0	1	0	0	0	1	0
22	(Brazil)	GK	Ricardo	1	0	0	0	0	0	0	0	1	0
23	(Slovakia)	MF	Michal Mravec	3	0	1	0	0	0	3	0	7	0
25	(Spain)	GK	Antonio Reguero	2	0	0	0	0	0	1	0	3	0
47	(Finland)	DF	Juuso Hämäläinen	8	0	0	0	0	1	0	0	8	1
77	(Spain)	MF	José Galán	3	1	0	0	0	0	0	0	3	1
85	(United States)	MF	Will John	1	0	0	0	0	0	0	0	1	0
86	(The Gambia)	DF	Abdou Jammeh	8	1	1	0	1	0	2	1	12	2
99	(Estonia)	FW	Albert Prosa	2	0	0	0	0	0	0	0	2	0
TOTALS				56	2	3	0	9	1	14	2	82	5
