= Jean Fridolin Nganbe Nganbe =

Cameroonian footballer

Personal information
- Full name: Jean Fridolin Nganbe Nganbe
- Date of birth: 11 May 1988 (age 38)
- Place of birth: Douala, Cameroon
- Height: 1.73 m (5 ft 8 in)
- Position: Forward

Senior career*
Years	Team	Apps	(Gls)
2008–2010	Pouma FC		
2008–2010	Canon Yaoundé		
2010	Oulu	20	(2)
2010–2011	Odra Wodzisław	12	(1)
2010–2011	OPS	40	(8)
2013	→ Lahti (loan)	15	(4)
2014	VPS	25	(2)
2015–2017	RoPS	28	(2)
2017–2019	Haka	22	(4)
2020	Keski-Uusimaa	8	(2)
2021	Ilves-Kissat	8	(2)
2023	Ilves-Kissat	8	(0)
- * Club domestic league appearances and goals

Jean Fridolin Nganbe Nganbe (born 11 May 1988) is a Cameroonian former professional footballer who played as forward.

== Career ==
=== Club ===
He went to Barcelona FC then. Prior to the start of the 2015 season, Nganbe signed for RoPS.

== Career statistics ==
As of match played 17 October 2016

Appearances and goals by club, season and competition
Club	Season	League			National Cup		League Cup		Continental		Other		Total	
Club	Season	Division	Apps	Goals	Apps	Goals	Apps	Goals	Apps	Goals	Apps	Goals	Apps	Goals
Lahti	2013	Veikkausliiga	15	4	0	0	0	0	–		–		15	4
VPS	2014	Veikkausliiga	25	2	0	0	5	3	2	0	–		32	5
RoPS	2015	Veikkausliiga	3	0	0	0	6	0	-		-		9	0
RoPS	2016	Veikkausliiga	25	2	2	1	2	0	4	0	-		33	3
RoPS	Total		28	2	2	1	8	0	4	0	-	-	42	3
Haka	2017	Ykkönen	5	1	0	0	–		–		–		5	1
Career total			73	9	2	1	13	3	6	0	-	-	94	13
