= Robert Taylor (footballer, born 1994) =

Finnish footballer (born 1994)

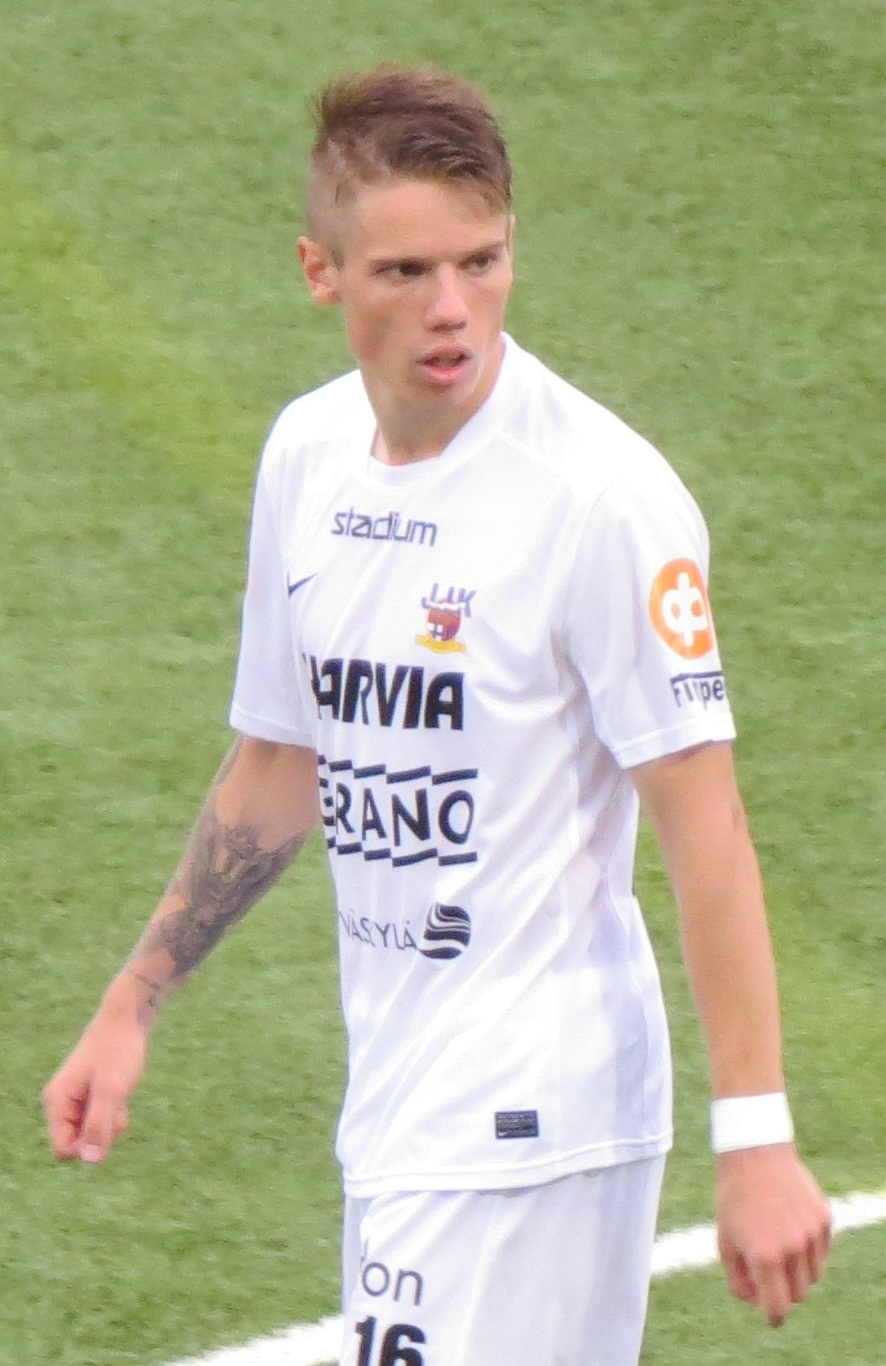
- Taylor playing for JJK in 2015

Personal information
- Full name: Robert Thomas Taylor
- Date of birth: 21 October 1994 (age 32)
- Place of birth: Kuopio, Finland
- Height: 1.82 m (6 ft 0 in)
- Positions: Midfielder; wing-back

Team information
- Current team: LA Galaxy
- Number: 21

Youth career
- 2004–2008: JJK
- 2008–2009: Nottingham Forest
- 2009–2011: JJK

Senior career*
Years	Team	Apps	(Gls)
2011	JJK	0	(0)
2011	→ Huima (loan)	1	(0)
2011–2013	Lincoln City	0	(0)
2013	→ Boston Town (loan)	1	(0)
2013	Barnet	0	(0)
2013–2015	JJK	50	(11)
2013	→ Villiketut (reserves)	6	(3)
2016–2017	RoPS	41	(14)
2017–2018	AIK	4	(0)
2018	→ Tromsø (loan)	17	(2)
2018–2019	Tromsø	38	(6)
2020–2021	Brann	57	(12)
2022–2025	Inter Miami	91	(13)
2025–2026	Austin FC	19	(1)
2026–	LA Galaxy	19	(3)

International career^{‡}
2011	Finland U17	2	(0)
2013	Finland U19	2	(0)
2011	Finland U20	2	(0)
2015–2016	Finland U21	10	(0)
2017–	Finland	34	(2)
- * Club domestic league appearances and goals as of 03:06, 8 November 2026 (UTC) ‡ National team caps and goals as of 20 November 2023 (UTC)

Robert Thomas Taylor (born 21 October 1994) is a Finnish professional footballer who plays as a midfielder and wing-back for Major League Soccer side LA Galaxy and the Finland national team.

== Youth career ==
Taylor joined the youth team at JJK in 2004, and stayed with the club until senior level. During this time, he had spells in the country of his father's birth, England, with Nottingham Forest and then Lincoln City, who he joined on a two-year scholarship in 2011.

== Club career ==
=== Boston Town (loan) ===
Taylor was loaned out to Boston Town of the United Counties League in 2013, where he made one appearance.

=== Barnet ===
Later in 2013, he joined Barnet, where he was due to sign a professional contract, but this fell through following their relegation from the English Football League.

=== JJK ===
Taylor played for JJK in the Ykkönen until 2015, when he joined Veikkausliiga side RoPS.

=== AIK ===
In July 2017, Taylor was transferred to AIK for €100,000.

=== Tromsø (loan) ===
He joined Tromsø on loan for the 2018 season, and then permanently for the 2019 season.

=== Brann ===
On 20 January 2020, Taylor penned a three-year deal with Brann, which saw Ruben Yttergård Jenssen go the other way.

=== Inter Miami ===
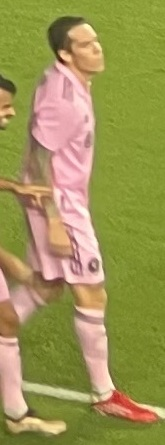
Taylor playing for Inter Miami

On 11 February 2022, Taylor moved to Major League Soccer (MLS) franchise Inter Miami on a two-year deal with an option for a further year, for a transfer fee of $500,000. He was scouted by the club to play as a winger and made his debut in the season opener on 26 February, a 0–0 draw with the Chicago Fire.

During the 2023 Leagues Cup, Taylor formed an attacking partnership with new Miami signings Lionel Messi, Sergio Busquets, and Jordi Alba that drew comparisons to Messi's earlier teammates Ángel Di María and Andrés Iniesta. He scored five goals and had three assists in seven matches as the club won their first trophy. On 25 October 2023, Inter Miami announced they had exercised their option to keep Taylor in Miami until the end of 2024.

On 18 July 2024, in a match against Toronto FC, both Taylor and his teammate Drake Callender made their 100th appearance for Inter Miami in all competitions combined, becoming the first players in the franchise's history to reach the milestone. On 26 July, Taylor extended his deal until the end of 2026 with a one-year option.

=== Austin FC ===
On April 23, 2025, Taylor was acquired by MLS franchise Austin FC for $700,000 in GAM plus conditional $50,000 GAM extra.

=== LA Galaxy ===
On July 15, 2026, Taylor signed with the LA Galaxy as a free agent for the rest of the 2026 season with an option to extend his contract until December 31, 2027.

== International career ==
Taylor has been capped by Finland at under-17, under-19, under-20, under-21 and senior level. He made his debut for the senior side on 9 January 2017 as a substitute in a 1–0 friendly win over Morocco.

On 11 October 2020, Taylor scored his first goal in a 2–0 UEFA Nations League victory over Bulgaria.

On 1 June 2021, Taylor was selected for Finland's UEFA Euro 2020 squad, but he did not appear in any of the matches of the tournament.

In March 2024, after Taylor was already named in the Finland squad for the UEFA Euro 2024 qualifying play-offs match against Wales, Taylor declined the call-up stating that he wants to focus more on an important MLS regular season match against New York Red Bulls.

== Personal life ==
Taylor was born in Kuopio to a Finnish mother and an English father. His father Paul is an English former footballer who played for KuPS in the 1990s. Paul resides in Jyväskylä and currently coaches youth teams in a local club Jyväskylän Komeetat.

== Career statistics ==
=== Club ===
As of match played 7 November 2026

Appearances and goals by club, season and competition
Club	Season	League			National cup (Note: Includes Finnish Cup, Svenska Cupen, Norwegian Cup, U.S. Open Cup)		League cup (Note: Includes Finnish League Cup)		Continental		Other		Total	
Club	Season	Division	Apps	Goals	Apps	Goals	Apps	Goals	Apps	Goals	Apps	Goals	Apps	Goals
JJK	2011	Veikkausliiga	0	0	0	0	1	0	—		―		1	0
Huima (loan)	2011	Kolmonen	1	0	0	0	―		―		—		1	0
Lincoln City	2012–13	Conference Premier	0	0	0	0	―		—		1 (Note: Appearances in Lincolnshire Senior Cup)	0	1	0
Boston Town (loan)	2012–13	United Counties League	1	0	―		―		―		—		1	0
JJK	2013	Veikkausliiga	11	1	1	0	0	0	―		―		12	1
JJK	2014	Ykkönen	18	3	1	0	0	0	―		―		19	3
JJK	2015	Ykkönen	21	7	0	0	0	0	―		―		21	7
JJK	Total		50	11	2	0	1	0	―		―		53	11
RoPS	2016	Veikkausliiga	31	11	2	1	5	0	4 (Note: Appearances in UEFA Europa League)	1	―		42	13
RoPS	2017	Veikkausliiga	10	3	4	3	0	0	―		―		14	6
RoPS	Total		41	14	6	4	5	0	4	1	―		56	19
AIK	2017	Allsvenskan	4	0	2	0	―		0	0	―		6	0
Tromsø (loan)	2018	Eliteserien	17	2	3	0	―		―		―		20	2
Tromsø	2018	Eliteserien	10	2	―		―		―		―		10	2
Tromsø	2019	Eliteserien	28	4	3	0	―		―		―		31	4
Tromsø	Tromsø total		55	8	6	0	―		―		―		61	8
Brann	2020	Eliteserien	30	6	—		―		―		―		30	6
Brann	2021	Eliteserien	27	6	2	2	―		―		1 (Note: Appearance in Eliteserien relegation play-offs)	0	30	8
Brann	Total		57	12	2	2	―		―		1	0	60	14
Inter Miami	2022	MLS	33	3	3	0	―		―		1 (Note: Appearance(s) in MLS Cup playoffs)	0	37	3
Inter Miami	2023	MLS	27	4	6	0	―		―		7 (Note: Appearances in Leagues Cup)	4	40	8
Inter Miami	2024	MLS	27	5	―		―		2 (Note: Appearances in CONCACAF Champions Cup)	1	3 (Note: Two appearances in Leagues Cup, one appearance in MLS Cup playoffs)	0	32	6
Inter Miami	2025	MLS	4	1	―		―		3	0	0	0	7	1
Inter Miami	Total		91	13	9	0	―		5	1	11	4	116	18
Austin FC	2025	MLS	17	1	2	0	―		―		2	0	21	1
Austin FC	2026	MLS	2	0	1	0	―		―		―		3	0
Austin FC	Total		19	1	3	0	―		―		2	0	24	1
LA Galaxy	2026	MLS	19	3	―		―		―		—		19	3
Career total			338	62	27	6	6	0	9	2	13	4	394	74

=== International ===
As of match played 17 November 2023

Appearances and goals by national team and year
National team	Year	Apps	Goals
Finland	2017	2	0
Finland	2018	5	0
Finland	2019	3	0
Finland	2020	7	1
Finland	2021	7	0
Finland	2022	3	0
Finland	2023	7	1
Total		34	2

As of match played 17 October 2023. Finland score listed first, score column indicates score after each Taylor goal.

List of international goals scored by Robert Taylor
No.	Date	Venue	Cap	Opponent	Score	Result	Competition
1	11 October 2020	Olympic Stadium, Helsinki, Finland	13	Bulgaria	1–0	2–0	2020–21 UEFA Nations League B
2	17 October 2023	Olympic Stadium, Helsinki, Finland	32	Kazakhstan	1–0	1–2	UEFA Euro 2024 qualifying

== Honours ==
Inter Miami

- Supporters' Shield: 2024
- Leagues Cup: 2023
- U.S. Open Cup runner-up: 2023

Austin FC

- U.S. Open Cup runner-up: 2025
