= Ricardo Friedrich =

Brazilian footballer (born 1993)

- Ricardo with Ankaragücü in 2020

Personal information
- Full name: Ricardo Henrique Schuck Friedrich
- Date of birth: 18 February 1993 (age 33)
- Place of birth: Candelária, Rio Grande do Sul, Brazil
- Height: 1.88 m (6 ft 2 in)
- Position: Goalkeeper

Team information
- Current team: Portuguesa
- Number: 1

Youth career
- Atlético Candelariense
- 2007–2012: Internacional
- 2012–2013: Ituano

Senior career*
| Years | Team | Apps | (Gls) |
| 2014 | Ituano | 0 | (0) |
| 2015 | Esportivo | 0 | (0) |
| 2015–2016 | RoPS | 31 | (0) |
| 2015–2016 | → Santa Claus (loan) | 3 | (0) |
| 2017–2019 | Bodø/Glimt | 74 | (0) |
| 2020–2021 | Ankaragücü | 37 | (0) |
| 2022–2023 | Kalmar FF | 56 | (0) |
| 2024–2026 | Malmö FF | 19 | (0) |
| 2025 | → HJK (loan) | 11 | (0) |
| 2027– | Portuguesa | 0 | (0) |
- * Club domestic league appearances and goals as of 19 November 2025

Ricardo Henrique Schuck Friedrich (born 18 February 1993), sometimes known as just Ricardo, is a Brazilian professional footballer who plays as a goalkeeper for Portuguesa.

== Career ==
=== Early career ===
Born in Candelária, Rio Grande do Sul, Ricardo began his career with Clube Atlético Candelariense in his hometown, before joining the youth categories of Internacional in 2007. In 2012, he moved to Ituano, being initially a member of their under-20 team before being a fourth-choice in the 2014 season, as the club won the Campeonato Paulista.

=== RoPS ===
Ricardo with RoPS in 2015

On 30 April 2015, after a short period at Esportivo, where he was also a backup option, Ricardo was announced at Finnish side RoPS. During a game between RoPS and FF Jaro on 28 June, he was replaced at half-time after suffering a concussion during the first half. In December, he extended his contract with RoPS for an additional two-seasons.

=== Bodø/Glimt ===
On 18 March 2017, Ricardo signed a one-year contract with Norwegian First Division side Bodø/Glimt. He quickly became a first-choice over Simon Thomas, and was an undisputed starter in the following years, with the club now in the Eliteserien, before departing the club in December 2019.

=== Ankaragücü ===
In January 2020, Ricardo switched teams and countries again after signing for Ankaragücü in Turkey. He immediately became a starter, but left the club in June 2021 after their relegation.

=== Kalmar FF ===
On 24 November 2021, Swedish side Kalmar FF announced the signing of Ricardo for the upcoming season. After helping the club to finish fourth and achieve their best-ever campaign in the last nine years, he received the Allsvenskan best goalkeeper award, ending the season with 14 games without conceding a goal.

In July 2023, in a 1–1 away draw against Mjällby AIF, Ricardo completed 50 matches for Kalmar. He also made his continental debut while at the club, playing in two UEFA Europa Conference League matches the following months.

=== Malmö FF ===
On 5 January 2024, Ricardo signed a three-year deal with Malmö FF. Unable to take the spot of longtime incumbent Johan Dahlin, he moved back to Finland on loan to HJK on 21 August 2025.

Back to Malmö for the 2026 season, Ricardo was only a fourth-choice behind Dahlin, Robin Olsen and William Nieroth, and mutually agreed to depart the club on 5 August of that year.

=== Portuguesa ===
On 16 October 2026, Ricardo returned to Brazil after more than 11 years, signing for Série D side Portuguesa.

== Personal life ==
Ricardo is the younger brother of Douglas Friedrich, also a goalkeeper.

== Career statistics ==
As of 16 October 2026

Appearances and goals by club, season and competition
| Club | Season | League | | | State league (Note: Includes Campeonato Paulista, Campeonato Gaúcho Série A2) | | Cup (Note: Includes Finnish Cup, Norwegian Football Cup, Turkish Cup, Svenska Cupen) | | League cup (Note: Includes Finnish League Cup) | | Continental | | Total | |
| Club | Season | Division | Apps | Goals | Apps | Goals | Apps | Goals | Apps | Goals | Apps | Goals | Apps | Goals |
|---|---|---|---|---|---|---|---|---|---|---|---|---|---|---|
| Ituano | 2014 | Série D | 0 | 0 | 0 | 0 | — | | — | | — | | 0 | 0 |
| Esportivo | 2015 | Gaúcho Série A2 | — | | 0 | 0 | — | | — | | — | | 0 | 0 |
| RoPS | 2015 | Veikkausliiga | 17 | 0 | — | | 0 | 0 | 0 | 0 | — | | 17 | 0 |
| RoPS | 2016 | Veikkausliiga | 14 | 0 | — | | 2 | 0 | 3 | 0 | 0 | 0 | 19 | 0 |
| RoPS | Total | | 31 | 0 | — | | 2 | 0 | 3 | 0 | 0 | 0 | 36 | 0 |
| Santa Claus (loan) | 2015 | Kakkonen | 2 | 0 | — | | 0 | 0 | — | | — | | 2 | 0 |
| Santa Claus (loan) | 2016 | Kakkonen | 1 | 0 | — | | 0 | 0 | — | | — | | 1 | 0 |
| Santa Claus (loan) | Total | | 3 | 0 | — | | 0 | 0 | — | | — | | 3 | 0 |
| Bodø/Glimt | 2017 | 1. divisjon | 22 | 0 | — | | 0 | 0 | — | | — | | 22 | 0 |
| Bodø/Glimt | 2018 | Eliteserien | 23 | 0 | — | | 3 | 0 | — | | — | | 26 | 0 |
| Bodø/Glimt | 2019 | Eliteserien | 29 | 0 | — | | 0 | 0 | — | | — | | 29 | 0 |
| Bodø/Glimt | Total | | 74 | 0 | — | | 3 | 0 | — | | — | | 77 | 0 |
| Ankaragücü | 2019–20 | Süper Lig | 13 | 0 | — | | 0 | 0 | — | | — | | 13 | 0 |
| Ankaragücü | 2020–21 | Süper Lig | 24 | 0 | — | | 0 | 0 | — | | — | | 24 | 0 |
| Ankaragücü | Total | | 37 | 0 | — | | 0 | 0 | — | | — | | 37 | 0 |
| Kalmar FF | 2022 | Allsvenskan | 29 | 0 | — | | 4 | 0 | — | | — | | 33 | 0 |
| Kalmar FF | 2023 | Allsvenskan | 27 | 0 | — | | 4 | 0 | — | | 2 (Note: Appearances in UEFA Europa Conference League) | 0 | 33 | 0 |
| Kalmar FF | Total | | 56 | 0 | — | | 8 | 0 | — | | 2 | 0 | 66 | 0 |
| Malmö FF | 2024 | Allsvenskan | 10 | 0 | — | | 1 | 0 | — | | 4 (Note: One appearance in UEFA Champions League, three appearances in UEFA Europa League) | 0 | 15 | 0 |
| Malmö FF | 2025 | Allsvenskan | 9 | 0 | — | | 4 | 0 | — | | 2 (Note: Appearances in UEFA Europa League) | 0 | 15 | 0 |
| Malmö FF | 2026 | Allsvenskan | 0 | 0 | — | | 0 | 0 | — | | 0 | 0 | 0 | 0 |
| Malmö FF | Total | | 19 | 0 | — | | 5 | 0 | — | | 6 | 0 | 30 | 0 |
| HJK (loan) | 2025 | Veikkausliiga | 11 | 0 | — | | 1 | 0 | 0 | 0 | 0 | 0 | 12 | 0 |
| Portuguesa | 2027 | Série D | 0 | 0 | 0 | 0 | 0 | 0 | — | | — | | 0 | 0 |
| Career total | | | 231 | 0 | 0 | 0 | 19 | 0 | 3 | 0 | 8 | 0 | 261 | 0 |

== Honours ==
Ituano'

- Campeonato Paulista: 2014

Malmö FF

- Allsvenskan: 2024
- Svenska Cupen: 2023–24

HJK

- Finnish Cup: 2025
