= Michal Mravec =

Slovak footballer

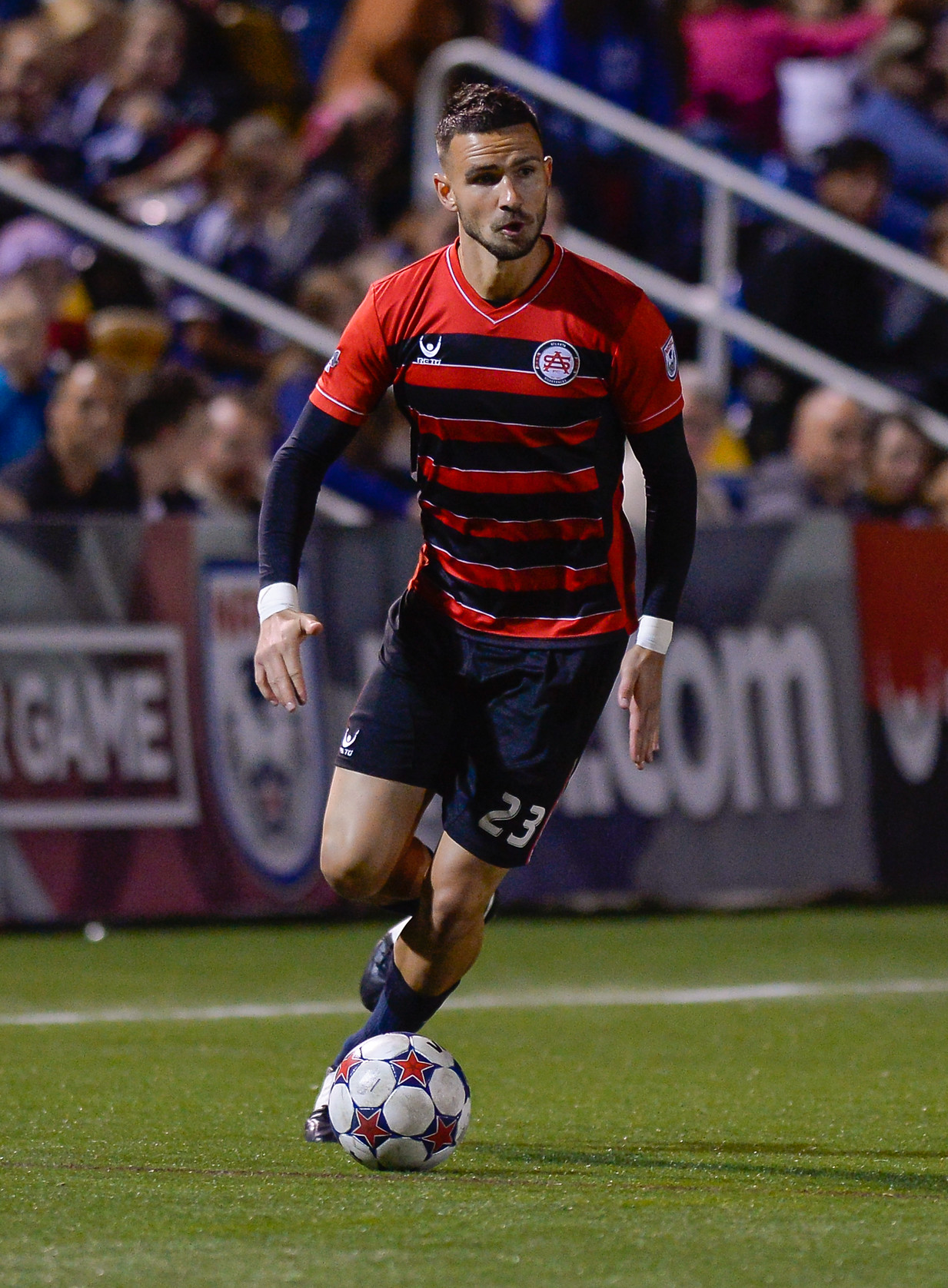

Personal information
- Full name: Michal Mravec
- Date of birth: 10 June 1987 (age 39)
- Place of birth: Žilina, Czechoslovakia
- Height: 1.80 m (5 ft 11 in)
- Position: Midfielder

Youth career
- MŠK Žilina

College career
Years	Team	Apps	(Gls)
2007–2010	UAB Blazers	71	(5)

Senior career*
Years	Team	Apps	(Gls)
2011–2012	Emmen	18	(0)
2013	Žilina	8	(0)
2014	Podbeskidzie	0	(0)
2014	Podbeskidzie II	9	(3)
2015	Atlanta Silverbacks	13	(1)
2016	RoPS	17	(2)
2017	KPV	22	(1)
2018	Frýdek-Místek	6	(0)
2018–2019	Fotbal Třinec	3	(0)
2019	Bytča		
2019–2020	Jednota Bánová		
2020–2022	SK Gbeľany		
- * Club domestic league appearances and goals

Michal Mravec (born 10 June 1987) is a Slovak former professional footballer who played as a midfielder.

== Career ==
Born in Žilina. He started his career by playing in the youth teams of MŠK Žilina, where he won numerous tournaments including competitions in the Netherlands, Italy and all over Europe.

Mravec was named the best juggler and the most technical player in the country at the U14 level. Later his career continued in the United States, where he joined Redwings Soccer Club based out of Atlanta.

At the age of 19, he accepted an offer for a full athletic scholarship from University of Alabama at Birmingham Men's Soccer Team and joined the Blazers. During his UAB career, Mravec earned a multiple C-USA All-Conference accolades.

Mravec was selected by MLS Sporting Kansas City in the 2011 MLS supplemental draft. In July 2011, he joined Dutch club FC Emmen on a two-year contract. He made his debut for FC Emmen against FC Eindhoven on 5 August 2011.

On 4 February 2013, he signed a two-and-a-half-year contract with MŠK Žilina.

On 25 July 2013, Mravec made his first team debut against NK Olimpija Ljubljana in the 2013–14 UEFA Europa League.

In February 2014, Mravec signed a 6-month deal with Podbeskidzie of Polish Ekstraklasa.

In March 2015, Mravec signed a contract with the Atlanta Silverbacks of the North American Soccer League.

In March 2016, Mravec signed a contract with RoPS of Finnish Veikkausliiga. In June and July 2016, Mravec played for RoPS in the 2016-2017 UEFA Europa League against Shamrock Rovers and Lokomotiva Zagreb.

== Personal life ==
Born in Žilina, Slovakia. Mravec spent several years in the United States.

Mravec holds a bachelor's degree from University of Alabama at Birmingham and an MBA degree from City University of Seattle.
