= Ville Iiskola =

Finnish footballer (born 1985)

Personal information
- Date of birth: 26 April 1985 (age 41)
- Place of birth: Jaala, Finland
- Height: 1.93 m (6 ft 4 in)
- Position: Goalkeeper

Team information
- Current team: RoPS

Senior career*
Years	Team	Apps	(Gls)
2006–2007	TPS	26	(0)
2008–2009	KuPS	51	(0)
2010	FC KooTeePee	17	(0)
2011–2014	MYPA	74	(0)
2015	RoPS	0	(0)
2015–2018	JaVo		
2018–	Sudet		
- * Club domestic league appearances and goals as of 14 April 2015

Ville Iiskola (born 26 April 1985) is a Finnish football player currently playing for RoPS.
