= Vilim Posinković =

Croatian footballer (born 1991)

Personal information
- Date of birth: 10 January 1991 (age 35)
- Place of birth: Sarajevo, SFR Yugoslavia
- Height: 1.87 m (6 ft 1 1/2 in)
- Positions: Striker; left winger

Team information
- Current team: Linth 04
- Number: 9

Youth career
- 2007: Hvar
- 2008: Jadran Stari Grad

Senior career*
Years	Team	Apps	(Gls)
2008–2010	Jadran Stari Grad	30	(16)
2010–2011	HAŠK		
2011	Lučko		
2011–2012	Kayseri Erciyesspor	14	(2)
2012	→ Giresunspor (loan)	6	(1)
2012–2013	Kavala	8	(0)
2013–2014	Slaven Belupo	0	(0)
2014	Iraklis Psachna	5	(0)
2015	RoPS	13	(1)
2012	→ FC Santa Claus (loan)	2	(0)
2015–2016	Kissamikos	20	(0)
2016–2017	Aiginiakos	0	(0)
2017	AEZ Zakakiou	8	(0)
2017–2018	Ruch Chorzów	19	(2)
2018–2019	Lokomotiv Plovdiv	21	(2)
2019–2020	Radnik Bijeljina	5	(1)
2021	Rot-Weiß Erfurt	0	(0)
2021	Lalitpur City	7	(0)
2021	Dugopolje	5	(0)
2022	Alki Oroklini	11	(2)
2022–2023	Cosmos Coblenz	30	(15)
2023–2024	Peramaikos		
2024–	Linth 04	6	(0)
- * Club domestic league appearances and goals as of 5 January 2025

Vilim Posinković (born 10 January 1991) is a Croatian professional footballer who plays as a left winger for Swiss club Linth 04.

== Career ==
Posinković joined Turkish club Giresunspor on loan from another Turkish club Kayseri Erciyesspor on 30 January 2012 for the rest of the season after having played 15 matches and scoring 2 goals. In March, he scored a goal in a 3–0 victory over Bucaspor. On 4 June 2012, Erciyesspor announced that he was one of the 16 players who was released. On 4 February 2013, he moved to Bosnia and Herzegovina, signing for Olimpik. In June 2013, he signed for Croatian club Slaven Belupo.

In March 2015 Posinković joined Finnish club RoPS. He scored two goals and two assists in the quarterfinal and semifinal of the Finnish League Cup, which guided his club to the final. In October, he scored a goal against Lahti in a league match which RoPS won 2–1. After a stint with another Finnish club Santa Claus, he joined Greek club Kissamikos on 14 September 2015.

After a stint with Cypriot club AEZ Zakakiou, Posinković signed for Polish I Liga club Ruch Chorzów on 19 July 2017, penning a two-year deal, which would keep him in the club till the end of June 2019. On 19 August 2017, he scored his first goal for the club in a 3–1 league victory against Stomil Olsztyn. In October, he found the net in a 2–1 victory against GKS Katowice in a derby. In the summer of 2018, Posinković joined PFC Lokomotiv Plovdiv. He stayed for one year at Lokomotiv, managing to win the 2018–19 Bulgarian Cup with the club.

On 23 September 2019, he returned to Bosnia and Herzegovina, signing a contract with Premier League of Bosnia and Herzegovina club FK Radnik Bijeljina. Posinković made his official debut for Radnik on 5 October 2019, in a 3–2 home league win against FK Sloboda Tuzla. He scored his first goal for Radnik on 19 October 2019, in a 0–3 away league win against FK Tuzla City. Posinković left Radnik in July 2020.

On 1 February 2021, Posinković joined German club FC Rot-Weiß Erfurt. However, he left the club again before making his debut, on 11 April 2021, to sign with Nepal Super League team Lalitpur City FC. Posinković left Nepal again in the summer and returned to Germany, where he began training with his former club, Rot-Weiß Erfurt. He also played a friendly game for Erfurt on 18 July 2021.

In August 2021, Posinković signed with NK Dugopolje in Croatia. On 30 December 2021, he signed with Cypriot club Alki Oroklini.

== Honours ==
Lokomotiv Plovdiv

- Bulgarian Cup: 2018–19
