= Mika Mäkitalo =

Finnish footballer (born 1985)

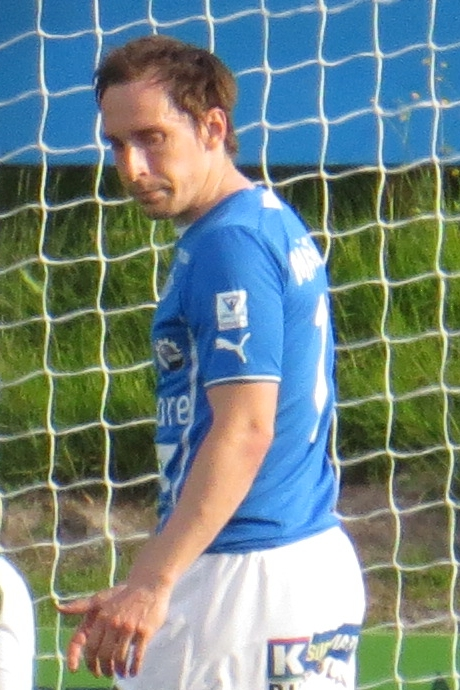
- Mika Mäkitalo

Personal information
- Date of birth: 12 June 1985 (age 41)
- Place of birth: Raisio, Finland
- Height: 1.74 m (5 ft 8 1/2 in)
- Position: Midfielder

Team information
- Current team: TPS
- Number: 8

Senior career*
Years	Team	Apps	(Gls)
2003–2008	Inter Turku	69	(4)
2009	Haka	23	(4)
2010–2011	Inter Turku	45	(0)
2012–2013	Lahti	48	(2)
2014–2017	RoPS	88	(7)
2017–2018	Inter Turku	50	(3)
2019–	TPS	1	(0)
- * Club domestic league appearances and goals as of 18:15, 5 May 2019 (UTC)

Mika Mäkitalo (born 12 June 1985) is a Finnish professional footballer who currently plays for TPS.
