= Juha Pirinen =

Finnish international footballer (born 1991)

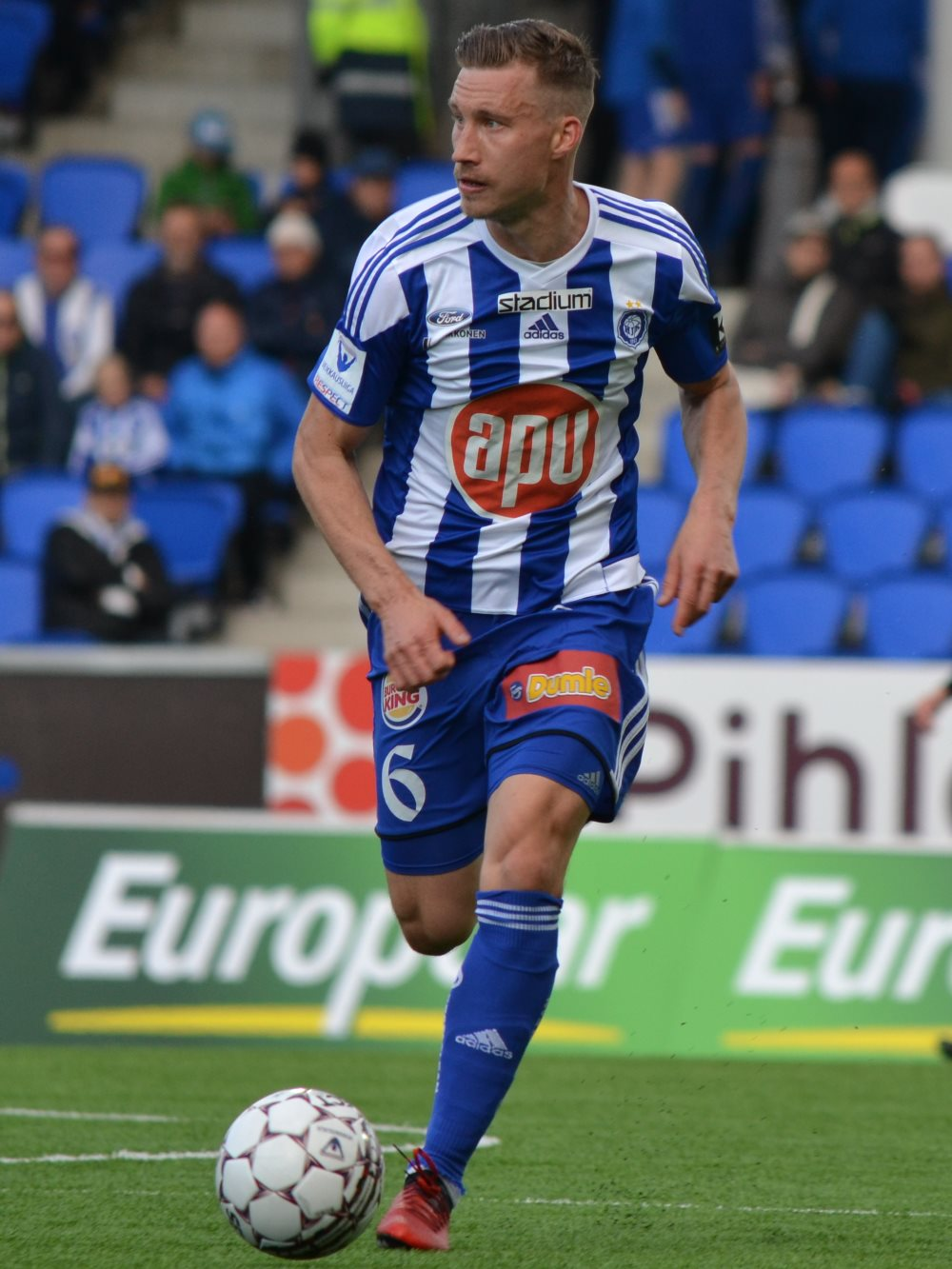
- Pirinen with HJK in 2017

Personal information
- Date of birth: 22 October 1991 (age 35)
- Place of birth: Valkeakoski, Finland
- Height: 1.85 m (6 ft 1 in)
- Positions: Left-back; centre-back

Team information
- Current team: AC Oulu
- Number: 66

Youth career
- 2002–2008: Haka

Senior career*
Years	Team	Apps	(Gls)
2008	Haka	1	(0)
2009–2010	Tampere United	35	(3)
2010	→ TPV (loan)	2	(0)
2011–2013	Haka	76	(6)
2014	MYPA	24	(0)
2015–2016	RoPS	62	(6)
2017–2018	HJK	52	(1)
2019–2020	Tromsø	26	(2)
2020–2022	AS Trenčín	54	(2)
2022–2023	Volos	24	(0)
2023–2024	Levadiakos	19	(0)
2024–2025	Kalamata	11	(0)
2026–	AC Oulu	31	(2)

International career
2010	Finland U19	2	(0)
2016–2021	Finland	20	(0)
- * Club domestic league appearances and goals as of 12 November 2026

Juha Pirinen (born 22 October 1991) is a Finnish professional footballer who plays as a left-back or a centre-back for Veikkausliiga club AC Oulu.

== Club career ==
Pirinen has played for Finnish Veikkausliiga club Tampere United and then moved back to his boyhood club FC Haka in January 2011. He played in Haka for three seasons, after which he moved to MYPA. Since MYPA folded in 2015, he played for RoPS. In 2017, he moved to HJK Helsinki for an undisclosed fee.

== International career ==
Pirinen made his international debut for Finland on 10 January 2016 against Sweden.

== Career statistics ==
As of 4 January 2025

Appearances and goals by club, season and competition
Club	Season	League			Cup (Note: Includes Suomen Cup, Norwegian Cup, Slovak Cup and Greek Cup)		League cup		Europe		Total	
Club	Season	Division	Apps	Goals	Apps	Goals	Apps	Goals	Apps	Goals	Apps	Goals
Haka	2008	Veikkausliiga	1	0	1	0	–		–		2	0
Tampere United	2009	Veikkausliiga	11	0	3	0	6	0	–		20	0
Tampere United	2010	Veikkausliiga	24	3	–		–		–		24	3
Tampere United	Total		35	3	3	0	6	0	0	0	44	3
TPV (loan)	2010	Ykkönen	2	0	–		–		–		2	0
Haka	2011	Veikkausliiga	21	1	–		1	0	–		22	1
Haka	2012	Veikkausliiga	26	3	3	2	2	1	–		31	6
Haka	2013	Ykkönen	27	2	4	1	–		–		31	3
Haka	Total		74	6	7	3	3	1	0	0	84	10
MyPa	2014	Veikkausliiga	24	0	1	0	1	0	3 (Note: Includes UEFA Europa League)	0	29	0
RoPS	2015	Veikkausliiga	31	5	0	0	7	0	–		38	5
RoPS	2016	Veikkausliiga	31	1	2	0	5	0	4	0	42	1
RoPS	Total		62	6	2	0	12	0	4	0	80	6
HJK	2017	Veikkausliiga	30	0	6	0	–		3	0	39	0
HJK	2018	Veikkausliiga	22	1	6	0	–		–		28	1
HJK	Total		52	1	12	0	0	0	3	0	67	1
Tromsø	2019	Eliteserien	26	2	3	0	–		–		29	2
Tromsø	2020	Eliteserien	0	0	0	0	–		–		0	0
Tromsø	Total		26	2	3	0	0	0	0	0	29	2
AS Trenčín	2020–21	Slovak First Football League	25	1	4	0	–		–		29	1
AS Trenčín	2021–22	Slovak First Football League	29	1	4	0	–		–		33	1
AS Trenčín	Total		54	2	8	0	0	0	0	0	62	2
Volos	2022–23	Super League Greece	24	0	2	0	–		–		26	0
Levadiakos	2023–24	Super League Greece 2	19	0	1	0	–		–		20	0
Kalamata	2024–25	Super League Greece 2	8	0	0	0	–		–		8	0
Career total			280	20	40	3	21	1	10	0	351	24

== Honours ==
HJK

- Veikkausliiga: 2017

Levadiakos

- Super League Greece 2: 2023–24

Individual

- Veikkausliiga Defender of the Year: 2017
- Veikkausliiga Team of the Year: 2017
