= Janne Saksela =

Finnish footballer (born 1993)

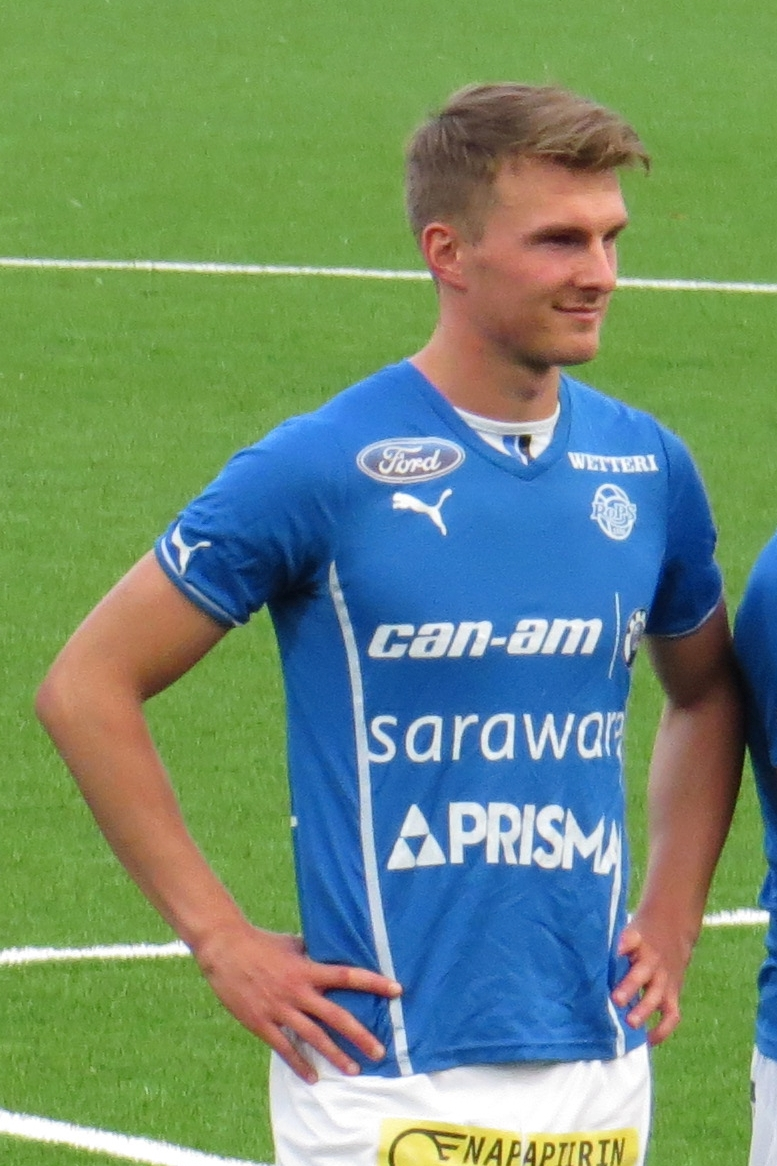
- Saksela in 2015

Personal information
- Date of birth: 14 March 1993 (age 33)
- Place of birth: Vantaa, Finland
- Height: 1.84 m (6 ft 0 in)
- Positions: Right back; midfielder

Senior career*
Years	Team	Apps	(Gls)
2009–2011	PK-35 Vantaa	19	(1)
2012	HJK	0	(0)
2012–2013	JJK Jyväskylä	9	(1)
2014–2017	RoPS	69	(3)
2017–2019	Sparta Rotterdam	22	(0)
2017–2018	Jong Sparta Rotterdam	5	(1)
2019–2020	Ilves	11	(0)
2021–2022	HJK	19	(0)

International career
2016–2017	Finland	7	(0)
- * Club domestic league appearances and goals

Janne Saksela (born 14 March 1993) is a Finnish former footballer.

== Club career ==
On 3 August 2019 he returned to Finland, signing a 1.5-year contract with Ilves. He suffered an ACL rupture just 8 days later in his second game for Ilves and missed several months. He announced his retirement from professional football in October 2022.

== International career ==
He was called up in the Finland national football team in 2016.

== Career statistics ==
As of match played 19 July 2021

Appearances and goals by club, season and competition
Club	Season	League			National Cup		League Cup		Other		Total	
Club	Season	Division	Apps	Goals	Apps	Goals	Apps	Goals	Apps	Goals	Apps	Goals
PK-35 Vantaa	2009	Ykkönen	1	0	0	0	–		–		1	0
PK-35 Vantaa	2010	Ykkönen	9	0	0	0	–		–		9	0
PK-35 Vantaa	2011	Ykkönen	9	1	0	0	–		–		9	1
PK-35 Vantaa	Total		19	1	0	0	0	0	0	0	19	1
HJK Helsinki	2012	Veikkausliiga	0	0	0	0	3	0	0	0	3	0
Klubi 04	2012	Kakkonen	7	0	–		–		–		7	0
JJK Jyväskylä	2012	Veikkausliiga	9	1	0	0	0	0	0	0	9	1
JJK Jyväskylä	2013	Veikkausliiga	0	0	0	0	0	0	0	0	0	0
JJK Jyväskylä	Total		9	1	0	0	0	0	0	0	9	1
RoPS	2014	Veikkausliiga	12	0	0	0	4	0	0	0	16	0
RoPS	2015	Veikkausliiga	27	1	1	0	7	3	1	0	36	4
RoPS	2016	Veikkausliiga	30	2	1	0	0	0	5	1	36	3
RoPS	Total		69	3	2	0	11	3	6	1	88	7
Sparta Rotterdam	2016–17	Eredivisie	5	0	0	0	–		0	0	5	0
Sparta Rotterdam	2017–18	Eredivisie	0	0	0	0	–		0	0	0	0
Sparta Rotterdam	2018–19	Eerste Divisie	17	0	0	0	–		2	0	19	0
Sparta Rotterdam	Total		22	0	0	0	–		2	0	24	0
Jong Sparta Rotterdam	2016–17	Tweede Divisie	2	0	–		–		–		2	0
Jong Sparta Rotterdam	2017–18	Tweede Divisie	3	1	–		–		–		3	1
Jong Sparta Rotterdam	Total		5	1	0	0	0	0	0	0	5	1
Ilves	2019	Veikkausliiga	2	0	0	0	–		0	0	2	0
Ilves	2020	Veikkausliiga	9	0	2	0	–		0	0	11	0
Ilves	Total		11	0	2	0	–		0	0	13	0
HJK Helsinki	2021	Veikkausliiga	17	0	2	1	–		8	1	27	2
HJK Helsinki	2022	Veikkausliiga	2	0	1	0	0	0	0	0	3	0
HJK Helsinki	Total		19	0	3	1	0	0	8	1	30	2
Klubi 04	2022	Kakkonen	3	0	–		–		–		3	0
Career total			164	6	5	1	14	3	16	2	199	12
