= Eetu Muinonen =

Finnish footballer (born 1986)

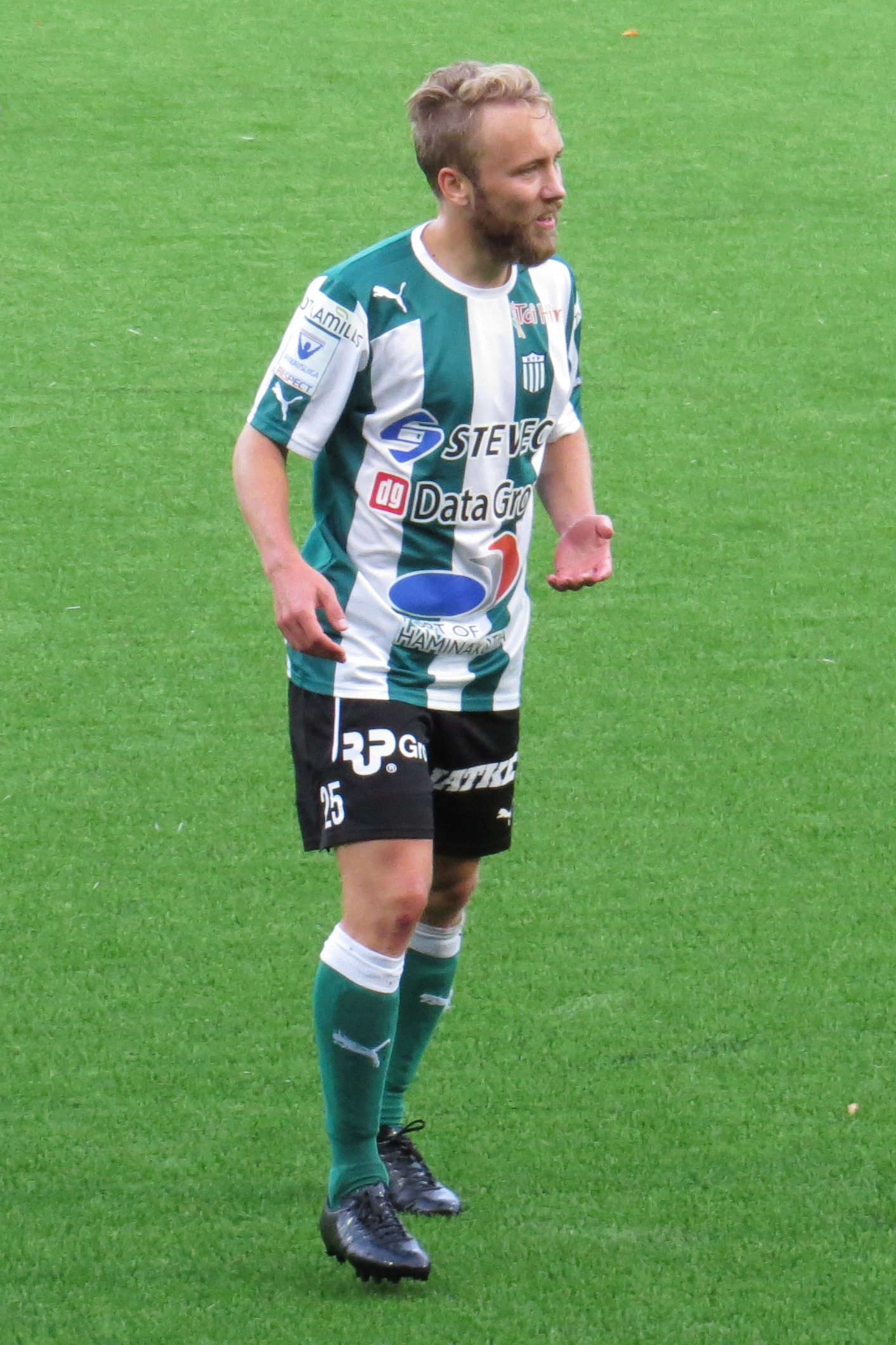

Personal information
- Date of birth: 5 April 1986 (age 40)
- Place of birth: Mikkeli, Finland
- Height: 1.70 m (5 ft 7 in)
- Position: Midfielder

Team information
- Current team: RoPS
- Number: 14

Youth career
- 1998–2000: MiKi
- 2001–2002: MP

Senior career*
| Years | Team | Apps | (Gls) |
| 2002 | MP | 9 | (1) |
| 2003–2008 | MYPA | 97 | (11) |
| 2004 | → Rakuunat (loan) | 5 | (0) |
| 2009 | Zulte Waregem | 1 | (0) |
| 2010 | MP | 12 | (1) |
| 2011–2012 | RoPS | 31 | (5) |
| 2013–2014 | Haka | 53 | (5) |
| 2015 | Fram Larvik | 0 | (0) |
| 2015 | KTP | 0 | (0) |
| 2016–2020 | RoPS | 113 | (9) |

International career
| 2001 | Finland U-15 | 4 | (0) |
| 2002 | Finland U-16 | 16 | (0) |
| 2003 | Finland U-17 | 7 | (0) |
| 2004 | Finland U-18 | 5 | (0) |
| 2006–2007 | Finland U-21 | 8 | (1) |
| 2007–2008 | Finland B | 5 | (0) |
- * Club domestic league appearances and goals as of 27 September 2021

Eetu Muinonen (born 5 April 1986) is a Finnish footballer, who plays for RoPS.

== Career ==
He has played in the Finnish premier division of football, Veikkausliiga, representing MyPa of Anjalankoski. On 1 January 2009 he joined Belgian club S.V. Zulte Waregem, together with teammate Tarmo Neemelo.

== International ==
He was also a member of Finland national under-21 football team.
