= Tomer Chencinski =

Canadian soccer player (born 1984)

Tomer Chencinski תומר חנצ'ינסקי
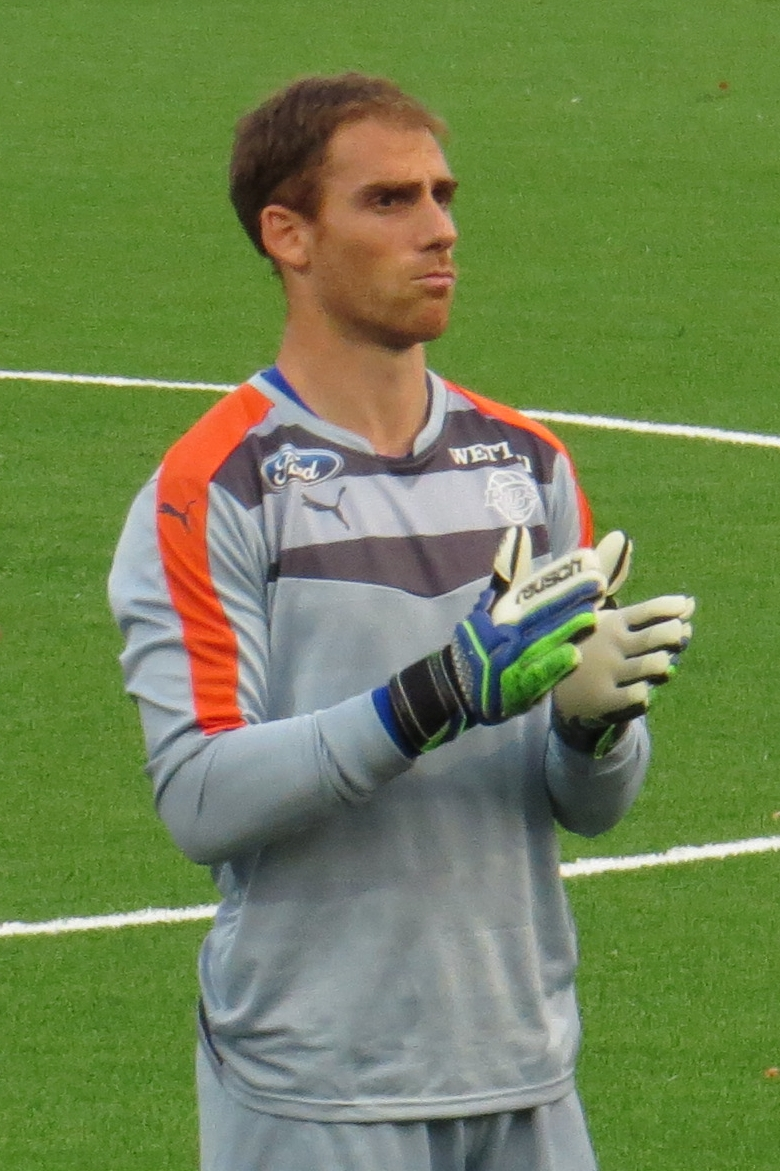
- Chencinski with RoPS in 2015

Personal information
- Full name: Tomer Chencinski
- Date of birth: December 1, 1984 (age 41)
- Place of birth: Bat Yam, Israel
- Height: 1.90 m (6 ft 3 in)
- Position: Goalkeeper

Youth career
- North York Hearts

College career
Years	Team	Apps	(Gls)
2003–2004	Robert Morris Colonials	37	(0)
2005–2006	Fairleigh Dickinson Knights	18	(0)

Senior career*
Years	Team	Apps	(Gls)
2007	Toronto FC	0	(0)
2007	North York Astros		
2007–2008	Detroit Ignition (indoor)	7	(0)
2008	Newark Ironbound Express	12	(0)
2008	Nistru Otaci	3	(0)
2009–2010	Harrisburg City Islanders	9	(0)
2011	VPS	28	(0)
2012	Örebro SK	14	(0)
2013–2014	Maccabi Tel Aviv	1	(0)
2014	→ Hakoah Amidar Ramat Gan (loan)	19	(0)
2014	→ Hapoel Nir Ramat HaSharon (loan)	6	(0)
2015	RoPS	12	(0)
2015	→ FC Santa Claus (loan)	2	(0)
2016	Helsingborgs IF	19	(0)
2017–2018	Shamrock Rovers	37	(0)
Total		169	(0)

International career
2013	Canada	1	(0)
- * Club domestic league appearances and goals

Tomer Chencinski (Hebrew: תומר חנצ'ינסקי; born December 1, 1984) is a former professional soccer player who played as a goalkeeper. He played college soccer at Robert Morris University, where in 2004 he ranked 16th in the nation in saves per game, and at Fairleigh Dickinson University. He most recently played for Irish club Shamrock Rovers. He also played one match for the Canada men's national soccer team.

== Early life ==
Chencinski was born in Bat Yam, Israel, to Ashkenazi Jewish parents originally from Poland. he has a brother. He and his family lived in Israel until he was eight years old, before moving to Thornhill, Canada, where he grew up. He attended Chapel School. He played youth soccer for the North York Hearts.

He speaks both English and Hebrew fluently.

== Playing career ==
=== College ===
Chencinski played two years of college soccer at Robert Morris University, where in 2004 he ranked 16th in the nation in saves per game and recorded six shutouts. He transferred to Fairleigh Dickinson University as a junior, where he played his final two collegiate seasons.

=== Toronto FC ===
Chencinski turned professional in 2007 when he signed with Major League Soccer side Toronto FC after impressing during a tryout, but never made an appearance for the team. He would also spend a portion of the 2007 season in the Canadian Soccer League with the North York Astros.

After the conclusion of the season, he played indoor soccer for Major Indoor Soccer League side Detroit Ignition.

=== Nistru Otaci ===
He dropped down a division to play in the USL Premier Development League for expansion side Newark Ironbound Express in 2008, but left mid-season when he was offered a contract by Moldova National Division side Nistru Otaci.

=== Harrisburg City Islanders ===
After playing just three games for Nistru Otaci, he returned to the United States, and signed for the Harrisburg City Islanders in 2009. After completing his season with the Harrisburg City Islanders, Chencinski spent time training with Major League Soccer side Philadelphia Union.

=== VPS ===
Expecting to start another season with Harrisburg, Chencinski was given the chance of a week-long trial with Finnish side VPS. After a successful trial, he was signed by the Finnish club to provide competition for the goalkeeper position.

He made his debut for VPS on February 5, 2011, in a 2–2 draw with FF Jaro in the Finnish League Cup.

=== Örebro SK ===
On December 5, 2011, he was confirmed for the Swedish Allsvenskan side Örebro SK for the 2012 season. He suffered relegation from the top flight to the second tier while playing fo the club.

=== Maccabi Tel Aviv ===
In late December 2012 Chencinski was transferred from Örebro to Maccabi Tel Aviv in the Israeli Premier League, for an undisclosed transfer fee.

=== RoPS ===
In January 2015, Chencinski left Israel and joined RoPS of Finland. RoPS would eventually finish in 2nd place during the 2015 Veikkausliiga, one point behind league winners SJK. Their finish earned the club entry into the first round of qualification for the 2016–17 UEFA Europa League.

=== FC Santa Claus (loan) ===
In 2015, he briefly went on loan to FC Santa Claus in the third tier, who played in the same city as RoPS, after returning from injury.

=== Helsingborgs IF ===
After his successful season in Finland, Chencinski joined Swedish club Helsingborg on December 8, 2015.

=== Shamrock Rovers ===
Chencinski joined Shamrock Rovers on December 15, 2016. He made his League of Ireland debut on the opening day of the 2017 League of Ireland Premier Division season. Chencinski made his European debut keeping a clean sheet as Rovers beat Stjarnan men's football in the 2017–18 UEFA Europa League. He made four appearances keeping two clean sheets in that season's competition. In a game against Dundalk F.C. Chencinski was racially abused in July. After being the starting goalkeeper for the 2017 season, Chencinski left Rovers midway through his second season with the club after they signed Alan Mannus as a replacement.

== International career ==
Chancinski is eligible to play for the national teams of Canada, Israel and Poland.

Chencinski represented Canada at the 2005 Maccabiah Games.

On March 14, 2013, Chencinski received his first call up by the Canada national team for friendlies against Japan and Belarus. Chencinski made his debut for the national team on March 25 starting the game against Belarus after Milan Borjan was benched following the loss to Japan, the game ended in a 2–0 defeat to the European nation.

== Style of play ==
Chencinski played as a goalkeeper. He was known for his leadership.

== Coaching career ==
In 2013, he was one of the coaches of Maccabi Canada's youth soccer team.

== Honours ==
Maccabi Tel Aviv

- Israeli Premier League: 2012–13, 2013-2014

== See also ==
- List of select Jewish football (association; soccer) players
