= David Ramadingaye =

Chadian footballer (born 1989)

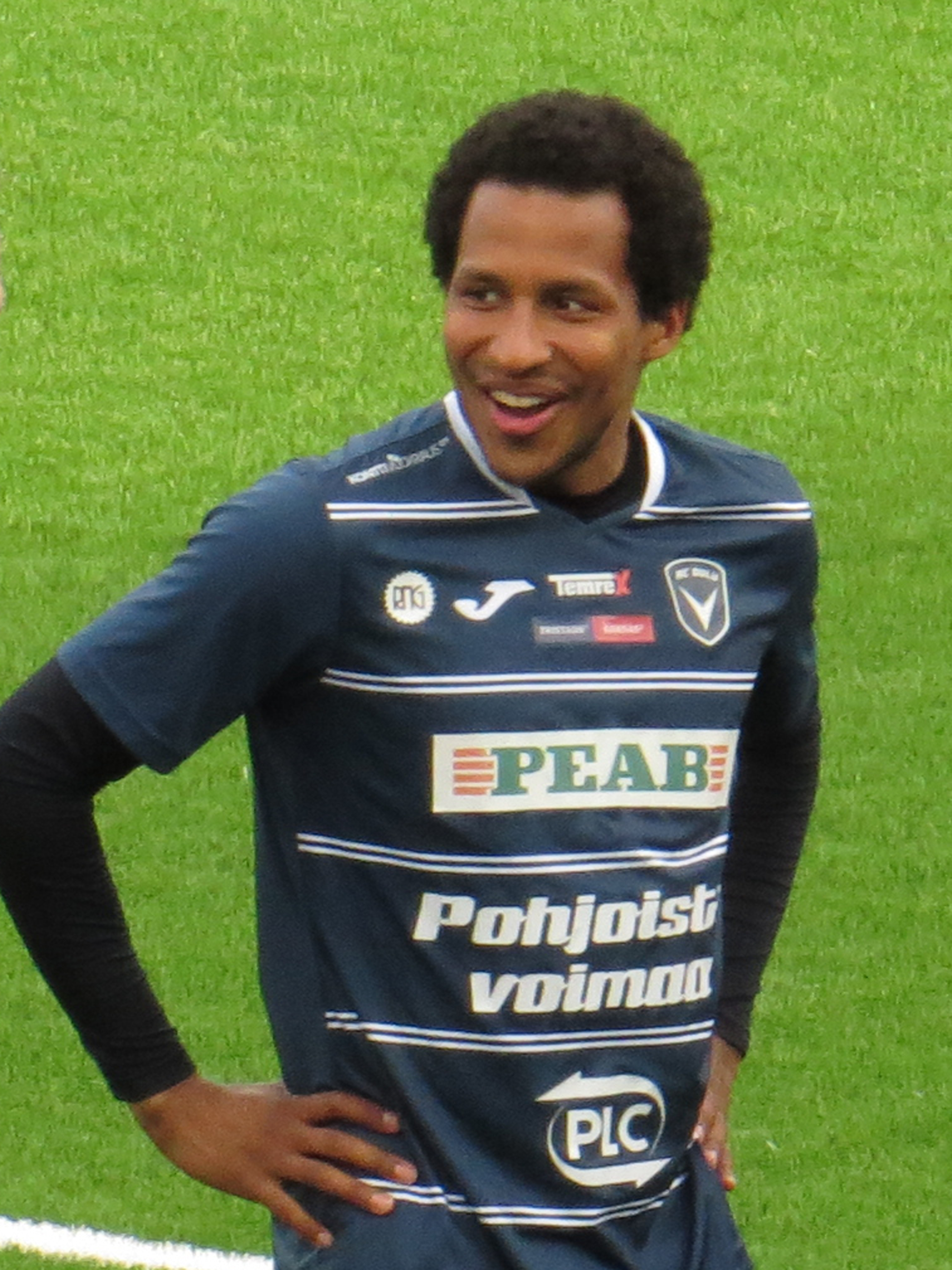
- Ramadingaye with AC Oulu in 2016.

Personal information
- Date of birth: 14 September 1989 (age 37)
- Place of birth: Oulu, Finland
- Height: 1.77 m (5 ft 10 in)
- Position: Midfielder

Senior career*
| Years | Team | Apps | (Gls) |
| 2009–2010 | Klubi-04 | 40 | (4) |
| 2010 | HJK Helsinki | 1 | (0) |
| 2011–2013 | MyPa | 77 | (1) |
| 2014 | IFK Mariehamn | 25 | (2) |
| 2015 | Honka | 7 | (1) |
| 2015 | RoPS | 4 | (0) |
| 2016–2019 | AC Oulu | 94 | (20) |
| 2020–2023 | KTP | 91 | (17) |

International career^{‡}
- Finland U18
- Finland U19
| 2023 | Chad | 2 | (0) |
- * Club domestic league appearances and goals as of 13 December 2023 (UTC) ‡ National team caps and goals as of 20 November 2023

David Ramadingaye (born 14 September 1989) is a retired footballer who last played for Finnish Veikkausliiga club KTP. Born in Finland, Ramadingaye represented Finland at youth level before debuting for the Chad national team in 2023.

== Career ==
=== Club career ===
On 19 December 2019 KTP confirmed, that they had signed Ramadingaye from AC Oulu.

After the 2023 season, Ramadingaye ended his professional career.

== Later career ==
After retiring as a player, for the 2024 Veikkausliiga season, Ramadingaye joined the TV-studio team for Veikkausliiga matches in Ruutu, the streaming service of Nelonen Media.

He has also worked for KTP in sales and marketing sector.

== Career statistics ==
=== Club ===
Appearances and goals by club, season and competition
| Club | Season | League | | | National cup | | League cup (Note: Includes Finnish League Cup and Ykköscup) | | Europe | | Total | |
| Club | Season | Division | Apps | Goals | Apps | Goals | Apps | Goals | Apps | Goals | Apps | Goals |
|---|---|---|---|---|---|---|---|---|---|---|---|---|
| Klubi 04 | 2009 | Ykkönen | 21 | 2 | – | | – | | – | | 21 | 2 |
| Klubi 04 | 2010 | Ykkönen | 19 | 2 | – | | – | | – | | 19 | 2 |
| Klubi 04 | Total | | 40 | 4 | 0 | 0 | 0 | 0 | 0 | 0 | 40 | 4 |
| HJK | 2010 | Veikkausliiga | 1 | 0 | 0 | 0 | 0 | 0 | 0 | 0 | 1 | 0 |
| MYPA | 2011 | Veikkausliiga | 25 | 0 | 1 | 0 | 1 | 0 | – | | 27 | 0 |
| MYPA | 2012 | Veikkausliiga | 26 | 1 | 4 | 0 | 5 | 0 | 3 (Note: Appearances in UEFA Europa League) | 0 | 38 | 1 |
| MYPA | 2013 | Veikkausliiga | 26 | 0 | 0 | 0 | 5 | 0 | – | | 31 | 0 |
| MYPA | Total | | 77 | 1 | 5 | 0 | 11 | 0 | 3 | 0 | 96 | 1 |
| IFK Mariehamn | 2014 | Veikkausliiga | 26 | 2 | 3 | 0 | 6 | 0 | – | | 34 | 2 |
| Honka | 2015 | Kakkonen | 7 | 1 | – | | – | | – | | 7 | 1 |
| RoPS | 2015 | Veikkausliiga | 4 | 0 | – | | – | | – | | 4 | 0 |
| PK-35 Vantaa | 2016 | Veikkausliiga | 0 | 0 | 0 | 0 | 1 | 0 | – | | 1 | 0 |
| AC Oulu | 2016 | Ykkönen | 22 | 8 | – | | – | | – | | 22 | 8 |
| AC Oulu | 2017 | Ykkönen | 21 | 3 | 1 | 1 | – | | – | | 21 | 4 |
| AC Oulu | 2018 | Ykkönen | 24 | 1 | 3 | 0 | – | | – | | 27 | 1 |
| AC Oulu | 2019 | Ykkönen | 20 | 5 | 4 | 2 | – | | – | | 24 | 7 |
| AC Oulu | Total | | 87 | 17 | 8 | 3 | 0 | 0 | 0 | 0 | 95 | 20 |
| KTP | 2020 | Ykkönen | 19 | 7 | 6 | 0 | – | | – | | 25 | 7 |
| KTP | 2021 | Veikkausliiga | 23 | 4 | 3 | 0 | – | | – | | 26 | 4 |
| KTP | 2022 | Ykkönen | 24 | 6 | 1 | 1 | 4 | 1 | – | | 29 | 8 |
| KTP | 2023 | Veikkausliiga | 25 | 0 | 5 | 1 | 3 | 0 | – | | 33 | 1 |
| KTP | Total | | 91 | 17 | 15 | 2 | 7 | 1 | 0 | 0 | 113 | 20 |
| Career total | | | 333 | 42 | 31 | 5 | 25 | 1 | 3 | 0 | 392 | 48 |

=== International ===
As of match played 20 November 2023

Chad
| Year | Apps | Goals |
|---|---|---|
| 2023 | 2 (Note: Appearances in 2026 FIFA World Cup qualification) | 0 |
| Total | 2 | 0 |

== Honours ==
KTP

- Ykkönen: 2022

Individual

- Ykkönen (second-tier): Player of the Month, August 2022
