= Abdou Jammeh =

Gambian footballer

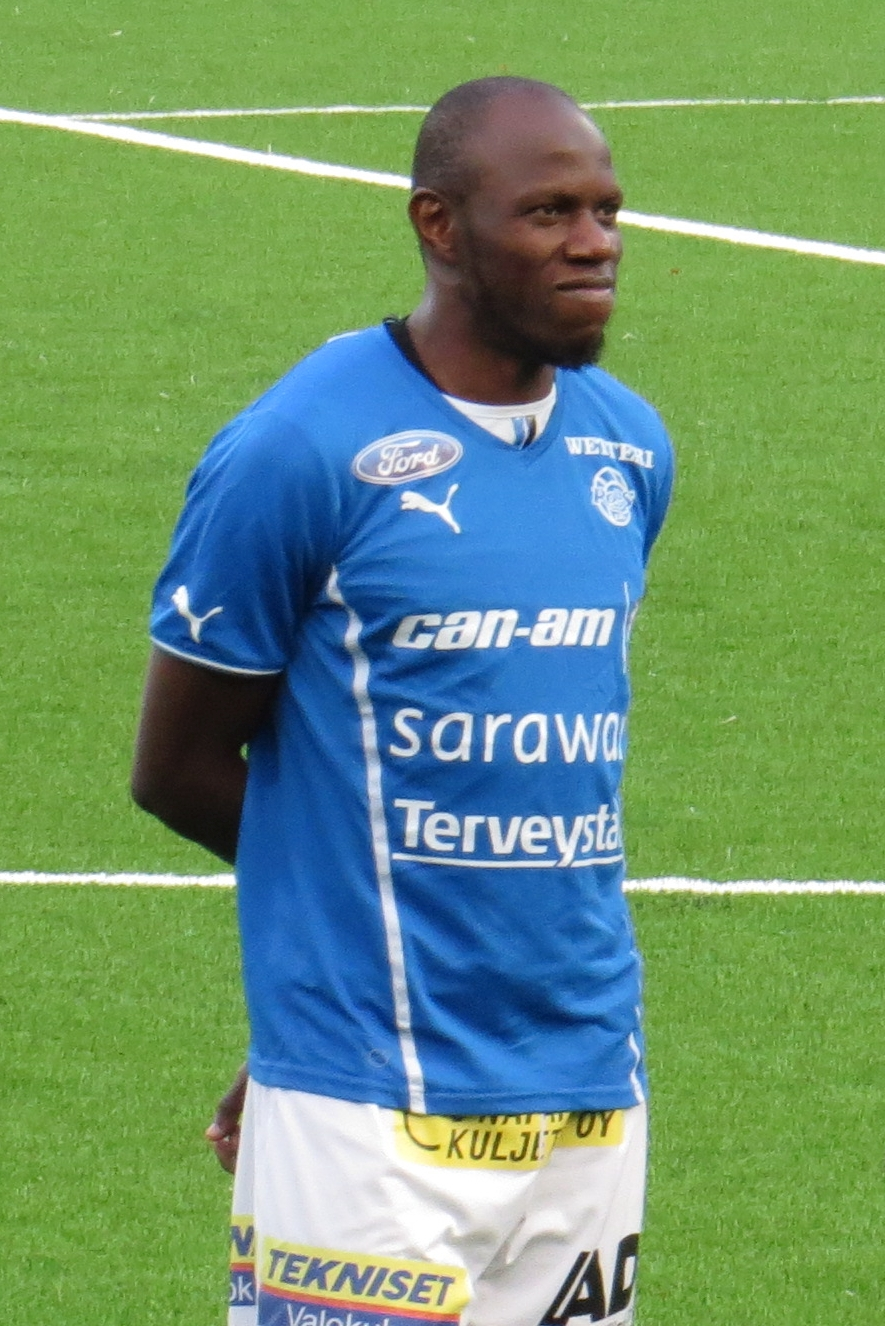

Personal information
- Full name: Abdou Jammeh
- Date of birth: 13 February 1986 (age 40)
- Place of birth: Bakau, Gambia
- Height: 1.87 m (6 ft 2 in)
- Position: Defender

Youth career
- Young Tigers Bakau
- Zebra FC

Senior career*
Years	Team	Apps	(Gls)
2005–2007	ES Zarzis	40	(0)
2007	Tekstilshchik Ivanovo	12	(0)
2008	Torpedo Moscow	17	(0)
2009–2010	Lierse	4	(0)
2010–2011	Doxa Katokopia	15	(0)
2011–2013	Kazma	19	(1)
2013	Steve Biko		
2013–2015	Al-Fahaheel		(1)
2015–2017	RoPS	61	(0)
	Al Shamal	0	(0)
2017	PKNS	9	(2)

International career^{‡}
2005–	Gambia	46	(3)
- * Club domestic league appearances and goals ‡ National team caps and goals as of 09:53, 28 October 2017 (UTC)

Abdou Jammeh (born 13 February 1986) is a former Gambian professional footballer.

== Career ==
Jammeh previously played for FC Torpedo Moscow in the Russian First Division. He signed for Torpedo in early 2008, following the relegation of his previous side FC Tekstilshchik-Telekom Ivanovo to the Russian Second Division, and having previously spent two years in Tunisia with ES Zarzis. In September 2011, Jammeh sign for Kazma in Kuwaiti Premier League.

== International career ==
Jammeh is also a member and captain of the Gambia national football team with 32 caps.

=== International goals ===
Scores and results list Ethiopia's goal tally first.

No	Date	Venue	Opponent	Score	Result	Competition
1.	11 October 2015	Independence Stadium, Bakau, Gambia	Morocco	1–0	1–1	2014 FIFA World Cup qualification
2.	20 January 2013	Stade Général Seyni Kountché, Niamey, Niger	Niger	1–0	3–1	Friendly
3.	9 October 2015	Independence Stadium, Bakau, Gambia	Namibia	1–0	1–1	2018 FIFA World Cup qualification
