= Ville Saxman =

Finnish footballer (born 1989)

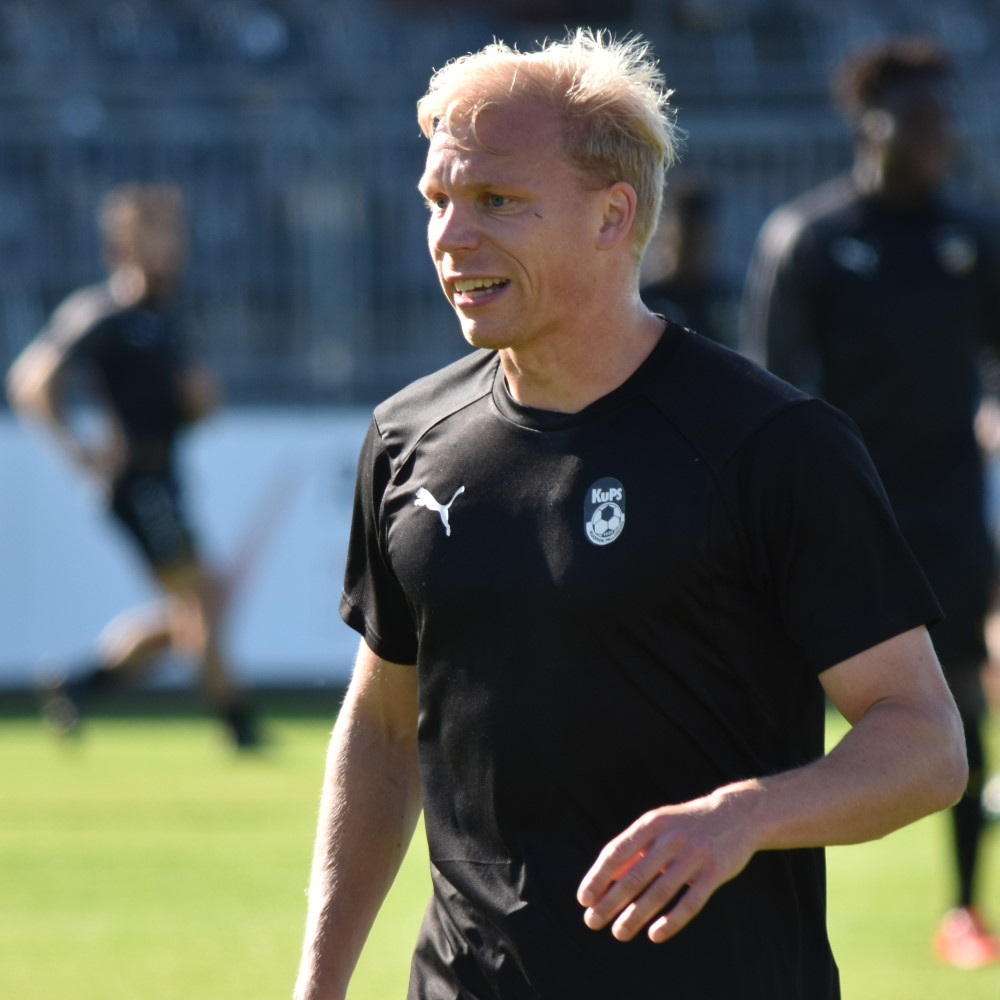

Personal information
- Date of birth: 15 November 1989 (age 36)
- Place of birth: Ylivieska, Finland
- Height: 1.77 m (5 ft 9 1/2 in)
- Position: Midfielder

Senior career*
Years	Team	Apps	(Gls)
2005–2009	FC YPA	95	(14)
2010–2012	MYPA	64	(4)
2013–2017	RoPS	112	(4)
2017–2020	KuPS	107	(16)
- * Club domestic league appearances and goals

Ville Saxman (born 15 November 1989) is a Finnish former footballer.

He began his career at home town Kakkonen club FC YPA before joining MYPA of Veikkausliiga in 2010. He also played for RoPS and KuPS in the Finnish premier league before announcing his retirement in November 2020 at the age of 30.

== Honours ==
=== Individual ===
- Veikkausliiga Team of the Year: 2019
