= Jarkko Lahdenmäki =

Finnish footballer (born 1991)

Personal information
- Date of birth: 16 April 1991 (age 35)
- Place of birth: Kemijärvi, Finland
- Height: 1.93 m (6 ft 4 in)
- Position: Centre back

Team information
- Current team: Rollon Pojat
- Number: 31

Youth career
- KP-55
- RoPS

Senior career*
Years	Team	Apps	(Gls)
2008	RoPS Farmi	9	(0)
2010–2017	RoPS	92	(3)
2011	→ Santa Claus (loan)	1	(0)
2012	→ Santa Claus (loan)	13	(0)
2013	→ TP-47 (loan)	9	(0)
2015–2016	→ Santa Claus (loan)	3	(0)
2017	Fredrikstad	11	(0)
2018	HIFK	25	(1)
2019–2022	Mjølner	26	(5)
2023–	Rollan Pojat	6	(2)
- * Club domestic league appearances and goals as of 11 January 2026

Jarkko Lahdenmäki (born 16 April 1991) a Finnish football player. Who plays for Rollon Parjat
