= Rovaniemen keskuskenttä =

Multi-purpose stadium in Rovaniemi, Finland

Keskuskenttä
- Keskari
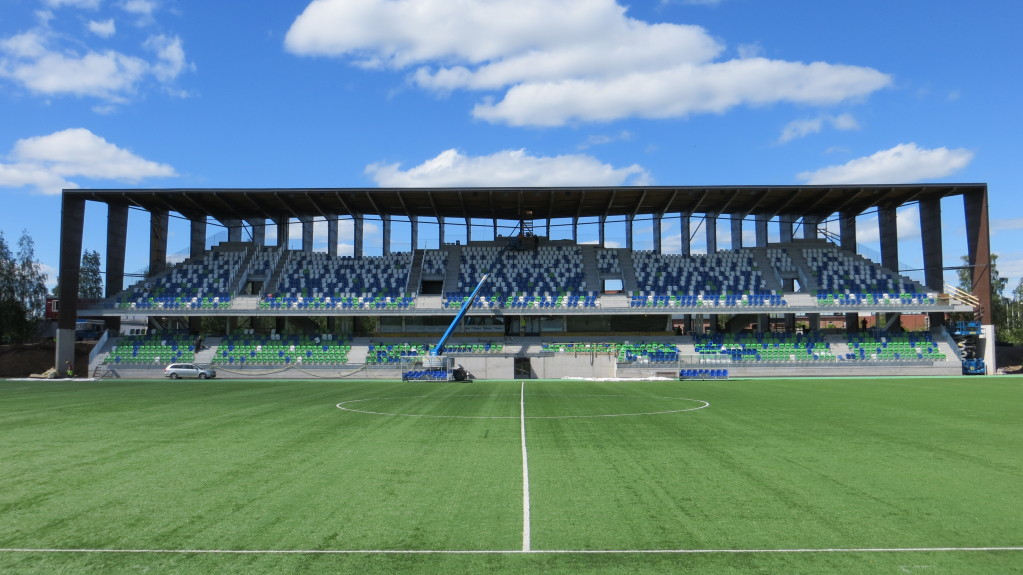
- Interactive map of Keskuskenttä
- Full name: Rovaniemen keskuskenttä
- Coordinates: 66°29′59″N 25°43′18″E
- Owner: City of Rovaniemi
- Capacity: 2800 (2800 covered)
- Surface: artificial
- Field size: 104 m x 67 m

Construction
- Built: 1953
- Opened: 1953
- Renovated: 2008-2009, 2014-2015

Tenants
- Rovaniemen Palloseura (RoPS); FC Santa Claus

Keskuskenttä is a multi-purpose stadium in Rovaniemi, Finland. It is currently used for football matches, football training and sport classes of nearby schools and daycare centres. During winter there is a skiing track for young skiers. The stadium has covered seating capacity of 2800, in two stands. Main stand capacity is 2000, second stand 800. Total capacity is up to over 5000. For running there are three tracks, with fourth track in front of main stand. Lanes are green in color.

The stadium has a new floodlighting with capacity of 1000 lux installed in 2008. During summer 2009 the grass pitch was replaced with third generation artificial turf with under-soil heating. Cost of stadium renovation so far is 1,5 million euros. During the grass pitch dig-up in June 2009, a German World War II -era 105-millimeter artillery shell was uncovered from ground. The shell was promptly removed by Lapland Air Defence Regiment and subsequently safely detonated. The new main stand was built in 2014–2015. The new stand have dressing rooms and other facilities incorporated within the structure. Its capacity is 2000 covered seatings and it cost 4,8 million euros.

Record attendance of 8 543 was made during the European Cup Winners Cup match between RoPS and Albanian KS Vllaznia Shkodër on November 4, 1987. In domestic league the record attendance is 5 471, during match between RoPS and HJK Helsinki in 1981.
