= Jussi Länsitalo =

Finnish footballer (born 1990)

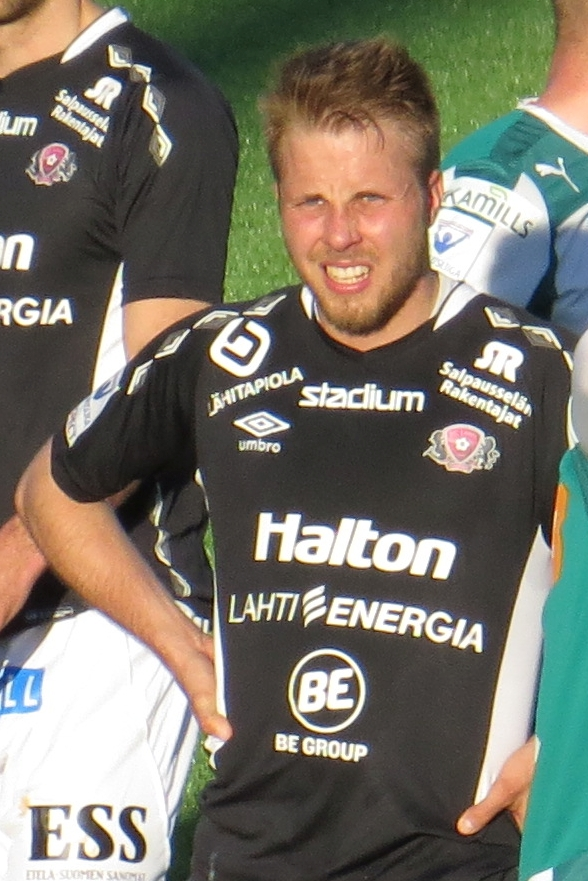
- Länsitalo with Lahti in 2015

Personal information
- Date of birth: 30 June 1990 (age 36)
- Place of birth: Pori, Finland
- Height: 1.82 m (6 ft 0 in)
- Position: Right winger

Youth career
- 1995–2000: ASV Birkenheide
- 2000–2004: FC Thayngen
- 2004–2006: FC Schaffhausen
- 2006–2007: Pleasant Valley Spartans
- 2007–2008: FC Reipas

Senior career*
| Years | Team | Apps | (Gls) |
| 2009–2014 | Lahti | 96 | (16) |
| 2014 | FSV 08 Bissingen | 1 | (0) |
| 2015–2017 | Lahti | 39 | (4) |
| Total | | 136 | (20) |
- * Club domestic league appearances and goals

Jussi Länsitalo (born 30 June 1990) is a Finnish former professional footballer who played as a right winger.

== Career ==
Länsitalo began his professional career with Lahti, and was the club top goalscorer in the 2013 Veikkausliiga season, before suffering a serious knee injury in a match against VPS in June 2013. In July 2014, he moved to German club FSV 08 Bissingen competing in the sixth-tier Verbandsliga Württemberg, where he would play while studying. He returned to Lahti in January 2015, and had a stint plagued by another knee injury, before retiring from football in December 2016, to become sales manager of the club.
