= 2017 PS Kemi Kings season =

Palloseura Kemi Kings
2017 season
- Chairman: Antti Pasanen
- Manager: Jari Åhman
- Stadium: Sauvosaaren Urheilupuisto
- Veikkausliiga: 10th
- Finnish Cup: Sixth round Group A
- Top goalscorer: League: Two Players (8); All: Filip Valenčič (12)
| Home colours | Away colours |

The 2017 season was Palloseura Kemi Kings's second Veikkausliiga season since their promotion back to the top flight in 2015.

== Squad ==
Note: Flags indicate national team as defined under FIFA eligibility rules; some limited exceptions apply. Players may hold more than one non-FIFA nationality.

| No. | Pos. | Nation | Player |
|---|---|---|---|
| 2 | DF | (Trinidad and Tobago) TRI | Aubrey David |
| 3 | DF | (Colombia) COL | Eduard Zea |
| 5 | DF | (Finland) FIN | Lassi Nurmos |
| 7 | DF | (Finland) FIN | Albion Ademi (loan from Inter Turku) |
| 8 | MF | (Finland) FIN | Matias Ojala |
| 9 | FW | (Finland) FIN | Rasmus Karjalainen |
| 10 | MF | (Estonia) EST | Sergei Mošnikov |
| 11 | FW | (Finland) FIN | Topias Wiena |
| 12 | GK | (Finland) FIN | Oskari Forsman |
| 14 | MF | (Finland) FIN | Justus Lehto |
| 17 | FW | (Finland) FIN | Aleksi Gullsten |
| 18 | FW | (The Gambia) GAM | Momodou Ceesay |

| No. | Pos. | Nation | Player |
|---|---|---|---|
| 19 | DF | (Finland) FIN | Niko-Petteri Kuukasjärvi |
| 20 | DF | (Finland) FIN | Aleksi Räihä |
| 21 | MF | (Colombia) COL | Julián Guevara |
| 22 | DF | (The Gambia) GAM | Abdoulie Mansally |
| 23 | MF | (Finland) FIN | Omar Jama |
| 24 | FW | (Colombia) COL | Edwin Salazar (loan from Orsomarso) |
| 26 | DF | (Estonia) EST | Marek Kaljumäe |
| 27 | MF | (Finland) FIN | Samuel Mahlamäki Camacho |
| 35 | GK | (Finland) FIN | Mikko Vilmunen |
| 62 | DF | (Finland) FIN | Juuso Laitinen |
| 99 | MF | (Finland) FIN | Joni Lehosmaa |

== Transfers ==
=== Winter ===
In: Note: Flags indicate national team as defined under FIFA eligibility rules; some limited exceptions apply. Players may hold more than one non-FIFA nationality.

| No. | Pos. | Nation | Player |
|---|---|---|---|
| 2 | DF | (Trinidad and Tobago) TRI | Aubrey David (from (Costa Rica) Deportivo Saprissa) |
| 3 | DF | (Colombia) COL | Eduard Zea (from (Colombia) Unión Magdalena) |
| 5 | DF | (Finland) FIN | Lassi Nurmos (from (Finland) AC Oulu) |
| 6 | DF | (Somalia) SOM | Abdulkadir Said Ahmed (from (Finland) PK-35 Vantaa) |
| 9 | FW | (Finland) FIN | Rasmus Karjalainen (from (Finland) AC Oulu) |
| 10 | FW | (Finland) FIN | Jussi Aalto (from (Finland) KTP) |
| 12 | GK | (Finland) FIN | Oskari Forsman (from (Finland) Turun Palloseura) |
| 14 | MF | (Finland) FIN | Justus Lehto (from (Finland) FC Jazz) |
| 18 | FW | (The Gambia) GAM | Momodou Ceesay (from (Slovakia) MŠK Žilina) |
| 19 | DF | (Finland) FIN | Niko-Petteri Kuukasjärvi (from (Finland) TP-47) |
| 21 | MF | (Colombia) COL | Julián Guevara (from (Malta) Naxxar Lions) |
| 23 | MF | (Finland) FIN | Omar Jama (from (Finland) HJK) |
| 22 | DF | (The Gambia) GAM | Abdoulie Mansally (from (United States) Houston Dynamo) |
| 24 | FW | (Colombia) COL | Edwin Salazar (loan from (Colombia) Orsomarso) |
| 26 | DF | (Estonia) EST | Marek Kaljumäe (from (Estonia) Levadia Tallinn) |
| 27 | MF | (Finland) FIN | Samuel Mahlamäki Camacho (from (Finland) KäPa) |
| 58 | MF | (Finland) FIN | Reza Heidari (from (Finland) PK-35 Vantaa) |
| 62 | DF | (Finland) FIN | Juuso Laitinen (from (Finland) KTP) |

Out: Note: Flags indicate national team as defined under FIFA eligibility rules; some limited exceptions apply. Players may hold more than one non-FIFA nationality.

| No. | Pos. | Nation | Player |
|---|---|---|---|
| 1 | GK | (Finland) FIN | Juhani Pennanen (to (Finland) OPS) |
| 2 | DF | (France) FRA | David Bitsindou |
| 5 | FW | (United States) USA | Christian Eissele (to (Finland) FF Jaro) |
| 7 | FW | (Sweden) SWE | Erik Törnros (loan return to (Sweden) Dalkurd) |
| 8 | MF | (Finland) FIN | Joona Veteli (to (Norway) Fredrikstad) |
| 9 | FW | (England) ENG | Billy Ions (to (Finland) SJK, previously on loan) |
| 11 | FW | (Saint Vincent and the Grenadines) VIN | Cornelius Stewart (to (Maldives) T.C. Sports Club) |
| 12 | GK | (Finland) FIN | Jusa Impiö |
| 13 | DF | (Finland) FIN | Janne Turpeenniemi |
| 15 | DF | (Serbia) SRB | Željko Savić (to (Brunei) DPMM) |
| 19 | MF | (Finland) FIN | Paavo Jokinen |
| 21 | DF | (Romania) ROU | Nicolae Vasile (to (Spain) Arandina) |
| 23 | DF | (Finland) FIN | Kalle Taimi (to (Finland) Lahti) |
| 87 | MF | (England) ENG | Ryan Gilligan (to (Finland) TP-47) |
| 88 | DF | (Finland) FIN | Tuomo Könönen (to (Finland) TP-47) |

=== Summer ===
In: Note: Flags indicate national team as defined under FIFA eligibility rules; some limited exceptions apply. Players may hold more than one non-FIFA nationality.

| No. | Pos. | Nation | Player |
|---|---|---|---|
| 7 | FW | (Finland) FIN | Albion Ademi (loan from (Finland) Inter Turku) |
| 10 | MF | (Estonia) EST | Sergei Mošnikov (from (Belarus) Minsk) |
| 66 | FW | (Netherlands) NED | Kevin Tano (from (Austria) SV Horn) |

Out: Note: Flags indicate national team as defined under FIFA eligibility rules; some limited exceptions apply. Players may hold more than one non-FIFA nationality.

| No. | Pos. | Nation | Player |
|---|---|---|---|
| 4 | MF | (Slovenia) SVN | Filip Valenčič (to (Finland) HJK) |
| 6 | DF | (Somalia) SOM | Abdulkadir Said Ahmed (to (Finland) KTP) |
| 7 | DF | (Finland) FIN | Henri Louste |
| 10 | FW | (Finland) FIN | Jussi Aalto (to (Finland) Pallo-Iirot) |
| 58 | MF | (Finland) FIN | Reza Heidari (to (Finland) Gnistan) |

== Competitions ==
=== Veikkausliiga ===
The 2017 Veikkausliiga season began on 5 April 2017 and ended on 28 October 2017.

==== League table ====
| Pos | Team | Pld | W | D | L | GF | GA | GD | Pts | Qualification or relegation |
|---|---|---|---|---|---|---|---|---|---|---|
| 8 | VPS | 33 | 9 | 12 | 12 | 38 | 51 | −13 | 39 | |
| 9 | Inter Turku | 33 | 10 | 8 | 15 | 54 | 57 | −3 | 38 | |
| 10 | PS Kemi Kings | 33 | 8 | 8 | 17 | 38 | 59 | −21 | 32 | |
| 11 | HIFK (R) | 33 | 6 | 11 | 16 | 37 | 54 | −17 | 29 | Qualification for the relegation play-offs |
| 12 | JJK Jyväskylä (R) | 33 | 6 | 8 | 19 | 32 | 63 | −31 | 26 | Relegation to the Ykkönen |

Updated to match(es) played on 28 October 2017. Source: Veikkausliiga (in Finnish), Soccerway
Rules for classification: 1) Points; 2) Goal difference; 3) Goals scored; 4) Head-to-head points; 5) Head-to-head goal difference; 6) Head-to-head away goals scored; 7) Play-off
(Note: Play-off is only played if need to decide champion, teams for relegation or UEFA competition and will be played on a neutral ground).
(R) Relegated

==== Results summary ====
| Overall | | | | | | | | Home | | | | | | Away | | | | | |
| Pld | W | D | L | GF | GA | GD | Pts | W | D | L | GF | GA | GD | W | D | L | GF | GA | GD |
|---|---|---|---|---|---|---|---|---|---|---|---|---|---|---|---|---|---|---|---|
| 33 | 8 | 8 | 17 | 38 | 59 | −21 | 32 | 3 | 7 | 6 | 19 | 25 | −6 | 5 | 1 | 11 | 19 | 34 | −15 |

Last updated: 28 October 2017.
Source: See Results

==== Results by matchday ====
| Matchday | 1 | 2 | 3 | 4 | 5 | 6 | 7 | 8 | 9 | 10 | 11 | 12 | 13 | 14 | 15 | 16 | 17 | 18 | 19 | 20 | 21 | 22 | 23 | 24 | 25 | 26 | 27 | 28 | 29 | 30 | 31 | 32 | 33 |
|---|---|---|---|---|---|---|---|---|---|---|---|---|---|---|---|---|---|---|---|---|---|---|---|---|---|---|---|---|---|---|---|---|---|
| Ground | H | H | A | H | A | H | A | H | A | H | H | A | H | A | H | A | A | A | H | A | H | A | H | A | A | H | A | H | A | A | H | A | H |
| Result | D | W | L | L | L | L | W | L | W | D | W | W | D | L | D | L | L | L | W | D | D | L | L | W | W | L | L | D | L | L | D | L | L |

Updated to match(es) played on 28 October 2017. Source: See Results
A = Away; H = Home; W = Win; D = Draw; L = Loss

==== Results ====
| 8 April 2017 1 | PS Kemi | 0 – 0 | HIFK | Rovaniemi |
| 16:00 EEST (UTC+3) | | Report | K.Raimi (yellow card) 35'; Vesala (yellow card) 38' | Stadium: Rovaniemen keskuskenttä Attendance: 405; Referee: Ville Nevalainen |

| 22 April 2017 2 | PS Kemi | 3 – 1 | SJK | Kemi |
| 16:00 EEST (UTC+3) | Zea (yellow card) 28' (goal) 78'; Aalto 43'; David (yellow card) 71'; Valenčič 80' | Report | Zeneli (yellow card) 26'; T.Hradecky 65'; Bardanca (yellow card) 77'; Abang (yellow card) 86' | Stadium: Sauvosaaren Urheilupuisto; Attendance: 844; Referee: Antti Munukka |

| 29 April 2017 3 | RoPS | 3 – 1 | PS Kemi | Rovaniemi |
| 16:00 EEST (UTC+3) | Addy 44' (pen.); S.Roiha 50'; Eze 72' | Report | Valenčič 8'; Ceesay (yellow card) 38'; Zea (yellow card) 40'; Guevara (yellow card) 55'; Mansally (yellow card) 90+4' | Stadium: Rovaniemen keskuskenttä Attendance: 1,443; Referee: Jani Laaksonen |

| 6 May 2017 4 | PS Kemi | 1 – 4 | KuPS | Kemi |
| 17:00 EEST (UTC+3) | Ojala (yellow card) 32'; David (yellow card) 50'; Salazar 87' | Report | U.Nissilä 4', 85'; Sorsa 20'; Savolainen 59' | Stadium: Sauvosaaren Urheilupuisto; Attendance: 707; Referee: Kalle Mäkinen |

| 12 May 2017 5 | IFK Mariehamn | 3 – 0 | PS Kemi | Mariehamn |
| 18:30 EEST (UTC+3) | Petrović (yellow card) 22'; Mkosana 78'; Kangaskolkka 84', 88' | Report | Salazar (yellow card) 17' | Stadium: Wiklöf Holding Arena; Attendance: 1,007; Referee: Toni Pohjoismäki |

| 19 May 2017 6 | PS Kemi | 0 – 1 | HJK | Kemi |
| 18:00 EEST (UTC+3) | Valenčič (yellow card) 32'; Ojala (yellow card) 68'; Salazar (yellow card) 76' | Report | Morelos 7' (yellow card) 42'; Patronen (yellow card) 81' | Stadium: Sauvosaaren Urheilupuisto; Attendance: 777; Referee: Kalle Mäkinen |

| 23 May 2017 7 | Inter Turku | 1 – 3 | PS Kemi | Turku |
| 18:30 EEST (UTC+3) | Gnabouyou (yellow card) 28' (goal) 40' | Report | Karjalainen 19'; Mansally (yellow card) 21'; Ceesay 71', 76' | Stadium: Veritas Stadion; Attendance: 2,028; Referee: Mikko Mörö |

| 27 May 2017 8 | PS Kemi | 0 – 1 | VPS | Kemi |
| 15:00 EEST (UTC+3) | David (yellow card) 43'; J.Laitinen (yellow card) 69'; Ceesay (yellow card) 76'; Mansally (yellow card) 78' | Report | Hakola 4'; Lahti (yellow card) 11'; J.Voutilainen (yellow card) 59' | Stadium: Sauvosaaren Urheilupuisto; Attendance: 615; Referee: Atte Jussila |

| 31 May 2017 9 | Ilves | 2 – 4 | PS Kemi | Tampere |
| 18:30 EEST (UTC+3) | Tuco 19'; J.Laitinen 85' (o.g.) | Report | Mansally 23'; Valenčič 34', 41'; J.Laitinen (yellow card) 36'; Karjalainen 59'; David (yellow card) 61'; Aalto (yellow card) 89' | Stadium: Tammelan Stadion; Attendance: 3,000; Referee: Marko Grönholm |

| 3 June 2017 10 | PS Kemi | 1 – 1 | JJK | Kemi |
| 17:00 EEST (UTC+3) | Valenčič 29' | Report | J.Pyhäranta (yellow card) 28'; Etock 31'; S.Vielma (yellow card) 55' (yellow-red card) 88'; Tapaninen (yellow card) 83'; Petrescu (yellow card) 86'; T.Tahvanainen (yellow card) 90+1' | Stadium: Sauvosaaren Urheilupuisto; Attendance: 1,014; Referee: Petri Viljanen |

| 14 June 2017 11 | PS Kemi | 3 – 0 | IFK Mariehamn | Kemi |
| 18:30 EEST (UTC+3) | Valenčič 20'; Mansally 64'; A.Gullsten 71' | Report | Petrović (yellow card) 23' | Stadium: Sauvosaaren Urheilupuisto; Attendance: 1,217; Referee: Petri Viljanen |

| 17 June 2017 12 | HIFK | 0 – 2 | PS Kemi | Helsinki |
| 15:00 EEST (UTC+3) | Kuusijärvi (yellow card) 14'; Halme (yellow card) 71'; Bäckman (yellow card) 71'; Lody (yellow card) 77' | Report | Mansally (yellow card) 13'; Guevara (yellow card) 13'; Valenčič 20', 57' (yellow card) 71'; Aalto (yellow card) 75' | Stadium: Telia 5G -areena Attendance: 2,546; Referee: Mikko Mörö |

| 21 June 2017 13 | PS Kemi | 1 – 1 | Lahti | Kemi |
| 18:30 EEST (UTC+3) | Ceesay (yellow card) 35'; Mansally 53'; Kaljumäe (yellow card) 58'; Valenčič (yellow card) 64' | Report | Simonovski 5'; Kärkkäinen (yellow card) 45+3'; Stênio (yellow card) 52'; O.Kekkonen (yellow card) 73' | Stadium: Sauvosaaren Urheilupuisto; Attendance: 1,177; Referee: Antti Munukka |

| 26 June 2017 14 | SJK | 1 – 0 | PS Kemi | Seinäjoki |
| 18:30 EEST (UTC+3) | T.Hradecky 4'; Hatakka (yellow card) 26'; Hetemaj (yellow card) 70'; Aksalu (yellow card) 90+3' | Report | | Stadium: OmaSP Stadion; Attendance: 2,857; Referee: Ville Nevalainen |

| 29 June 2017 15 | PS Kemi | 1 – 1 | RoPS | Kemi |
| 18:30 EEST (UTC+3) | Mansally 31' (yellow card) 62'; Valenčič (yellow card) 52'; Guevara (yellow card) 65'; A.Gullsten (yellow card) 77' | Report | Eze (yellow card) 45+1'; Okkonen (yellow card) 52'; L.Väisänen 55'; A.Nurmela (yellow card) 77' | Stadium: Sauvosaaren Urheilupuisto; Attendance: 3,325; Referee: Mikko Mörö |

| 4 July 2017 16 | Lahti | 1 – 0 | PS Kemi | Lahti |
| 18:30 EEST (UTC+3) | Stênio 4'; Hauhia (yellow card) 86' | Report | Salazar (yellow card) 84'; David (yellow card) 90+2' | Stadium: Lahti Stadium; Attendance: 2,633; Referee: Mattias Gestranius |

| 8 July 2017 17 | KuPS | 3 – 0 | PS Kemi | Kuopio |
| 17:00 EEST (UTC+3) | J.Mäkelä 11'; Purje 15'; Gabriel 39'; Saxman (yellow card) 64' | Report | Mansally (yellow card) 34'; Salazar (yellow card) 79' | Stadium: Kuopio Football Stadium; Attendance: 2,248; Referee: Petri Viljanen |

| 23 July 2017 18 | HJK | 3 – 1 | PS Kemi | Helsinki |
| 18:30 EEST (UTC+3) | Rafinha (yellow card) 54'; Jalasto 59'; Pelvas 79'; Valenčič 90+1' (pen.) | Report | Ceesay (yellow card) 61'; Karjalainen 64'; David (yellow card) 70'; Kaljumäe (yellow card) 76'; Zea (yellow card) 90+1' | Stadium: Telia 5G -areena Attendance: 2,912; Referee: Jari Järvinen |

| 29 July 2017 19 | PS Kemi | 2 – 1 | Inter Turku | Kemi |
| 17:00 EEST (UTC+3) | Karjalainen 4', 62'; Kaljumäe (yellow card) 40'; Mansally (yellow card) 59' (yellow-red card) 67'; Guevara (yellow card) 65'; David (yellow card) 90+1'; A.Gullsten (yellow card) 90+4' | Report | Henrique (yellow card) 27'; Gnabouyou 88'; Mäkitalo (yellow card) 90'; Kanakoudis (yellow card) 90+1' | Stadium: Sauvosaaren Urheilupuisto; Attendance: 1,151; Referee: Mikko Mörö |

| 6 August 2017 20 | VPS | 3 – 3 | PS Kemi | Vaasa |
| 15:00 EEST (UTC+3) | Sohna (yellow card) 44'; J.Vahtera 45+2'; Lähde 52'; Jürgenson 90' | Report | Ceesay 10'; Karjalainen 12'; Ademi (yellow card) 14' (goal) 60'; Jama (yellow card) 78' | Stadium: Hietalahti Stadium; Attendance: 2,375; Referee: Dennis Antamo |

| 9 August 2017 21 | PS Kemi | 0 – 0 | Ilves | Kemi |
| 18:30 EEST (UTC+3) | Mošnikov (yellow card) 22' | Report | Aspegren (yellow card) 32' | Stadium: Sauvosaaren Urheilupuisto; Attendance: 1,520; Referee: Ville Nevalainen |

| 13 August 2017 22 | JJK | 2 – 1 | PS Kemi | Jyväskylä |
| 17:00 EEST (UTC+3) | Lähitie 62' (yellow card) 87'; F.Gustavsson (yellow card) 65'; Etock 90' | Report | Mansally (yellow card) 82'; Karjalainen 89' | Stadium: Harjun stadion Attendance: 1,274; Referee: Dennis Antamo |

| 19 August 2017 23 | PS Kemi | 1 – 5 | Inter Turku | Kemi |
| 17:00 EEST (UTC+3) | Guevara (yellow card) 49'; Mansally 72' | Report | T.Varmanen (yellow card) 14'; Kanakoudis 16'; Lehtonen 18'; Källman 23'; Njoku (yellow card) 61' (goal) 70'; Nyman (yellow card) 62'; Henrique 82' | Stadium: Sauvosaaren Urheilupuisto; Attendance: 1,298; Referee: Jani Laaksonen |

| 26 August 2017 24 | Lahti | 0 – 1 | PS Kemi | Lahti |
| 17:00 EEST (UTC+3) | Sesay (yellow card) 90+4' | Report | Jama (yellow card) 11'; Ceesay 56' | Stadium: Lahti Stadium; Attendance: 2,035; Referee: Ville Nevalainen |

| 7 September 2017 25 | RoPS | 0 – 1 | PS Kemi | Rovaniemi |
| 18:30 EEST (UTC+3) | Okkonen (yellow card) 90' | Report | Mansally (yellow card) 16'; Ademi 23'; Kaljumäe (yellow card) 42'; Ojala (yellow card) 58'; Guevara (yellow card) 63'; A.Gullsten (yellow card) 74'; Ceesay (yellow card) 88' | Stadium: Rovaniemen keskuskenttä Attendance: 2,921; Referee: Jari Järvinen |

| 10 September 2017 26 | PS Kemi | 1 – 2 | JJK | Kemi |
| 15:00 EEST (UTC+3) | L.Nurmos (yellow card) 19'; Mošnikov 63'; Guevara (yellow card) 88' | Report | Tapaninen 41'; Kari 82' | Stadium: Sauvosaaren Urheilupuisto; Attendance: 888; Referee: Toni Pohjoismäki |

| 17 September 2017 27 | IFK Mariehamn | 3 – 2 | PS Kemi | Mariehamn |
| 18:30 EEST (UTC+3) | Kojola 10'; J.Mattsson 45'; Petrović 63' | Report | Karjalainen 36'; Tano 82' | Stadium: Wiklöf Holding Arena; Attendance: 1,252; Referee: Marko Grönholm |

| 24 September 2017 28 | PS Kemi | 1 – 1 | VPS | Kemi |
| 15:00 EEST (UTC+3) | L.Nurmos (red card) 25'; Mošnikov 35'; Kaljumäe (yellow card) 86'; David (yellow card) 87' | Report | J.Levänen 26'; J.Voutilainen (yellow card) 78'; M.Viitikko (yellow card) 86' | Stadium: Sauvosaaren Urheilupuisto; Attendance: 1,077; Referee: Anntamo Dennis |

| 30 September 2017 29 | HJK | 4 – 0 | PS Kemi | Helsinki |
| 17:00 EEST (UTC+3) | Pelvas 39'; Valenčič 45+1'; Jallow 63', 90+2'; Obilor (yellow card) 73' | Report | Ceesay (yellow card) 50'; Mansally (yellow card) 65'; Guevara (yellow card) 71' | Stadium: Telia 5G -areena Attendance: 3,151; Referee: Toni Pohjoismäki |

| 12 October 2017 30 | HIFK | 4 – 0 | PS Kemi | Helsinki |
| 18:30 EEST (UTC+3) | Mäkelä 5', 21'; Ristola 5', 46'; Halme (yellow card) 73' | Report | Guevara (yellow card) 35'; Salazar (yellow card) 70' (yellow-red card) 78'; Zea (yellow card) 78' | Stadium: Telia 5G -areena Attendance: 2,427; Referee: Dennis Antamo |

| 15 October 2017 31 | PS Kemi | 3 – 3 | SJK | Kemi |
| 15:00 EEST (UTC+3) | Tano (yellow card) 36'; Ceesay (yellow card) 43' (goal) 47'; Mošnikov (yellow card) 45+1' (goal) 50' (pen.); Zea (yellow card) 52'; Jama 65' | Report | Hetemaj 34' (yellow card) 55'; Hambo (yellow card) 41'; Zeneli 70'; Mero 78'; Hatakka (yellow card) 81' | Stadium: Sauvosaaren Urheilupuisto; Attendance: 838; Referee: Ville Nevalainen |

| 20 October 2017 32 | Ilves | 1 – 0 | PS Kemi | Tampere |
| 18:30 EEST (UTC+3) | Ayarna (yellow card) 14'; Noubissi (yellow card) 54' (goal) 62' | Report | Ceesay (yellow card) 60' | Stadium: Tammelan Stadion; Attendance: 4,753; Referee: Toni Pohjoismäki |

| 28 October 2017 33 | PS Kemi | 1 – 3 | KuPS | Kemi |
| 14:00 EEST (UTC+3) | David (yellow card) 14'; Mansally 44'; Zea (yellow card) 82'; Ademi (yellow card) 86'; Guevara (yellow card) 89' | Report | Purje 32'; Saxman 33'; Boxall 37' | Stadium: Sauvosaaren Urheilupuisto; Attendance: 1,147; Referee: Antti Munukka |

=== Finnish Cup ===
==== Sixth Round ====
| Team | Pld | W | D | L | GF | GA | GD | Pts |
|---|---|---|---|---|---|---|---|---|
| KPV | 5 | 5 | 0 | 0 | 14 | 6 | +8 | 15 |
| RoPS | 5 | 3 | 1 | 1 | 17 | 6 | +11 | 10 |
| PS Kemi | 5 | 2 | 2 | 1 | 11 | 6 | +5 | 8 |
| AC Oulu | 5 | 2 | 0 | 3 | 12 | 9 | +3 | 6 |
| OPS | 5 | 1 | 1 | 3 | 3 | 18 | −15 | 4 |
| HauPa | 5 | 0 | 0 | 5 | 7 | 19 | −12 | 0 |

| 29 January 2017 1 | PS Kemi | 2 – 3 | KPV | Kemi |
| 15:00 EET (UTC+2) | Ojala 75'; Gilligan 90' (pen.) | Report | Cózar 33'; Sirbiladze 38', 77'; K.Ågren (yellow card) 56'; Myntti (yellow card) 74' | Stadium: Junkohalli TN; Attendance: 390; Referee: Janne Jussila |

| 11 February 2017 2 | PS Kemi | 2 – 1 | AC Oulu | Kemi |
| 15:00 EET (UTC+2) | Valenčič 20'; Karjalainen 75'; Ojala (yellow card) 77' | Report | Jovović 3'; S.Leppälä (yellow card) 16'; Tulio (yellow card) 39' | Stadium: Junkohalli TN; Attendance: 415; Referee: Pietu Niinimäki |

| 19 February 2017 3 | PS Kemi | 0 – 0 | OPS | Kemi |
| 15:00 EET (UTC+2) | | Report | J.Lämsä (yellow card) 39' | Stadium: Junkohalli TN; Attendance: 273; Referee: Daniel Enkvist |

| 25 February 2017 4 | HauPa | 1 – 6 | PS Kemi | Oulu |
| 14:00 EET (UTC+2) | Tuominen 58'; J.Pernu (yellow card) 77' | Report | L.Nurmos (yellow card) 19'; Gilligan (yellow card) 43'; Aalto 49', 69', 85'; Valenčič 60', 90+2'; A.Gullsten (yellow card) 64'; Kaljumäe 73' | Stadium: Heinäpää PH TN; Attendance: 322; Referee: Atte Räinä |

| 1 March 2017 5 | RoPS | 1 – 1 | PS Kemi | Kajaani |
| 18:00 EET (UTC+2) | Heikkilä 18'; J.Hämäläinen (yellow card) 23'; S.Roiha (yellow card) 65'; A.Heikkilä (yellow card) 66'; Okkonen (yellow card) 79'; S.Tukiainen (yellow card) 85'; Reguero (yellow card) 90+2' | Report | Ojala (yellow card) 42' (yellow-red card) 69'; Kaljumäe (yellow card) 51'; Valenčič 74' | Stadium: Pallohalli TN; Attendance: 200; Referee: Antti Munukka |

== Squad statistics ==
As of Match played 28 October 2017

=== Appearances and goals ===
| No. | Pos | Nat | Player | Total | | Veikkausliiga | | Finnish Cup | |
| No. | Pos | Nat | Player | Apps | Goals | Apps | Goals | Apps | Goals |
|---|---|---|---|---|---|---|---|---|---|
| 2 | DF | (Trinidad and Tobago) TRI | Aubrey David | 25 | 0 | 25 | 0 | 0 | 0 |
| 3 | DF | (Colombia) COL | Eduard Zea | 11 | 1 | 10+1 | 1 | 0 | 0 |
| 5 | DF | (Finland) FIN | Lassi Nurmos | 26 | 0 | 18+4 | 0 | 4 | 0 |
| 7 | FW | (Finland) FIN | Albion Ademi | 14 | 2 | 12+2 | 2 | 0 | 0 |
| 8 | MF | (Finland) FIN | Matias Ojala | 33 | 1 | 28 | 0 | 4+1 | 1 |
| 9 | FW | (Finland) FIN | Rasmus Karjalainen | 37 | 9 | 22+10 | 8 | 4+1 | 1 |
| 10 | MF | (Estonia) EST | Sergei Mošnikov | 15 | 3 | 15 | 3 | 0 | 0 |
| 11 | FW | (Finland) FIN | Topias Wiena | 2 | 0 | 0+1 | 0 | 0+1 | 0 |
| 12 | GK | (Finland) FIN | Oskari Forsman | 34 | 0 | 29 | 0 | 5 | 0 |
| 14 | MF | (Finland) FIN | Justus Lehto | 19 | 0 | 1+16 | 0 | 1+1 | 0 |
| 17 | FW | (Finland) FIN | Aleksi Gullsten | 31 | 1 | 12+14 | 1 | 5 | 0 |
| 18 | FW | (The Gambia) GAM | Momodou Ceesay | 26 | 5 | 22+4 | 5 | 0 | 0 |
| 19 | DF | (Finland) FIN | Niko-Petteri Kuukasjärvi | 2 | 0 | 0+1 | 0 | 0+1 | 0 |
| 21 | MF | (Colombia) COL | Julián Guevara | 31 | 0 | 31 | 0 | 0 | 0 |
| 22 | DF | (The Gambia) GAM | Abdoulie Mansally | 29 | 6 | 28+1 | 6 | 0 | 0 |
| 23 | MF | (Finland) FIN | Omar Jama | 30 | 1 | 16+10 | 1 | 2+2 | 0 |
| 24 | FW | (Colombia) COL | Edwin Salazar | 14 | 1 | 3+10 | 1 | 1 | 0 |
| 26 | DF | (Estonia) EST | Marek Kaljumäe | 33 | 1 | 27+1 | 0 | 5 | 1 |
| 27 | MF | (Finland) FIN | Samuel Mahlamäki | 2 | 0 | 0 | 0 | 1+1 | 0 |
| 35 | GK | (Finland) FIN | Mikko Vilmunen | 4 | 0 | 4 | 0 | 0 | 0 |
| 62 | DF | (Finland) FIN | Juuso Laitinen | 35 | 0 | 29+1 | 0 | 5 | 0 |
| 66 | FW | (Netherlands) NED | Kevin Tano | 12 | 1 | 10+2 | 1 | 0 | 0 |
Players away from the club on loan:
Players who left PS Kemi Kings during the season:
| 4 | MF | (Slovenia) SVN | Filip Valenčič | 22 | 12 | 16+1 | 8 | 4+1 | 4 |
| 7 | DF | (Finland) FIN | Henri Louste | 2 | 0 | 0 | 0 | 2 | 0 |
| 6 | MF | (Somalia) SOM | Abdulkadir Said Ahmed | 2 | 0 | 0 | 0 | 0+2 | 0 |
| 10 | FW | (Finland) FIN | Jussi Aalto | 5 | 3 | 0 | 0 | 4+1 | 3 |
| 58 | MF | (Finland) FIN | Reza Heidari | 7 | 0 | 1+2 | 0 | 2+2 | 0 |
| 87 | MF | (England) ENG | Ryan Gilligan | 5 | 1 | 0 | 0 | 5 | 1 |

=== Goal scorers ===
| Place | Position | Nation | Number | Name | Veikkausliiga | Finnish Cup | Total |
|---|---|---|---|---|---|---|---|
| 1 | MF | (Slovenia) | 4 | Filip Valenčič | 8 | 4 | 12 |
| 2 | FW | (Finland) | 9 | Rasmus Karjalainen | 8 | 1 | 9 |
| 3 | DF | (The Gambia) | 22 | Abdoulie Mansally | 6 | 0 | 6 |
| 4 | FW | (The Gambia) | 18 | Momodou Ceesay | 5 | 0 | 5 |
| 5 | FW | (Finland) | 10 | Jussi Aalto | 1 | 3 | 4 |
| 6 | MF | (Estonia) | 10 | Sergei Mošnikov | 3 | 0 | 3 |
| 7 | FW | (Finland) | 7 | Albion Ademi | 2 | 0 | 2 |
| 8 | DF | (Colombia) | 3 | Eduard Zea | 1 | 0 | 1 |
| 8 | FW | (Colombia) | 24 | Edwin Salazar | 1 | 0 | 1 |
| 8 | FW | (Netherlands) | 66 | Kevin Tano | 1 | 0 | 1 |
| 8 | MF | (Finland) | 23 | Omar Jama | 1 | 0 | 1 |
| 8 | FW | (Finland) | 17 | Aleksi Gullsten | 1 | 0 | 1 |
| 8 | MF | (Finland) | 8 | Matias Ojala | 0 | 1 | 1 |
| 8 | MF | (England) | 87 | Ryan Gilligan | 0 | 1 | 1 |
| 8 | DF | (Estonia) | 26 | Marek Kaljumäe | 0 | 1 | 1 |
| TOTALS | | | | | 38 | 11 | 49 |

=== Disciplinary record ===
| Number | Nation | Position | Name | Veikkausliiga | | Finnish Cup | | Total | |
| Number | Nation | Position | Name | Booked | Sent off (straight red) | Booked | Sent off (straight red) | Booked | Sent off (straight red) |
| 2 | (Trinidad and Tobago) | DF | Aubrey David | 9 | 0 | 0 | 0 | 9 | 0 |
| 3 | (Colombia) | DF | Eduard Zea | 6 | 0 | 0 | 0 | 6 | 0 |
| 5 | (Finland) | DF | Lassi Nurmos | 1 | 1 | 1 | 0 | 2 | 1 |
| 7 | (Finland) | FW | Albion Ademi | 2 | 0 | 0 | 0 | 2 | 0 |
| 8 | (Finland) | MF | Matias Ojala | 3 | 0 | 3 | 1 | 6 | 1 |
| 10 | (Estonia) | MF | Sergei Mošnikov | 2 | 0 | 0 | 0 | 2 | 0 |
| 17 | (Finland) | FW | Aleksi Gullsten | 3 | 0 | 1 | 0 | 4 | 0 |
| 18 | (The Gambia) | FW | Momodou Ceesay | 8 | 0 | 0 | 0 | 8 | 0 |
| 21 | (Colombia) | MF | Julián Guevara | 10 | 0 | 0 | 0 | 10 | 0 |
| 22 | (The Gambia) | DF | Abdoulie Mansally | 11 | 1 | 0 | 0 | 12 | 1 |
| 23 | (Finland) | MF | Omar Jama | 2 | 0 | 0 | 0 | 2 | 0 |
| 24 | (Colombia) | FW | Edwin Salazar | 6 | 1 | 0 | 0 | 6 | 1 |
| 26 | (Estonia) | DF | Marek Kaljumäe | 5 | 0 | 1 | 0 | 6 | 0 |
| 62 | (Finland) | DF | Juuso Laitinen | 2 | 0 | 0 | 0 | 2 | 0 |
| 66 | (Netherlands) | FW | Kevin Tano | 1 | 0 | 0 | 0 | 1 | 0 |
Players who left PS Kemi Kings during the season:
| 4 | (Slovenia) | MF | Filip Valenčič | 4 | 0 | 0 | 0 | 4 | 0 |
| 10 | (Finland) | FW | Jussi Aalto | 2 | 0 | 0 | 0 | 2 | 0 |
| 87 | (England) | MF | Ryan Gilligan | 0 | 0 | 1 | 0 | 1 | 0 |
| TOTALS | | | | 77 | 3 | 7 | 1 | 84 | 4 |
