= Niko-Petteri Kuukasjärvi =

Finnish footballer (born 1999)

Personal information
- Date of birth: 9 September 1999 (age 27)
- Position: Defender

Team information
- Current team: PS Kemi

Senior career*
Years	Team	Apps	(Gls)
2017–	PS Kemi	1	(0)
2018	→ TP-47 (loan)	3	(0)
- * Club domestic league appearances and goals as of 09:32, 8 June 2018 (UTC)

Niko-Petteri Kuukasjärvi (born 9 September 1999) is a Finnish professional footballer who plays for PS Kemi, as a defender.
