= Aubrey David =

Trinidadian footballer (born 1990)

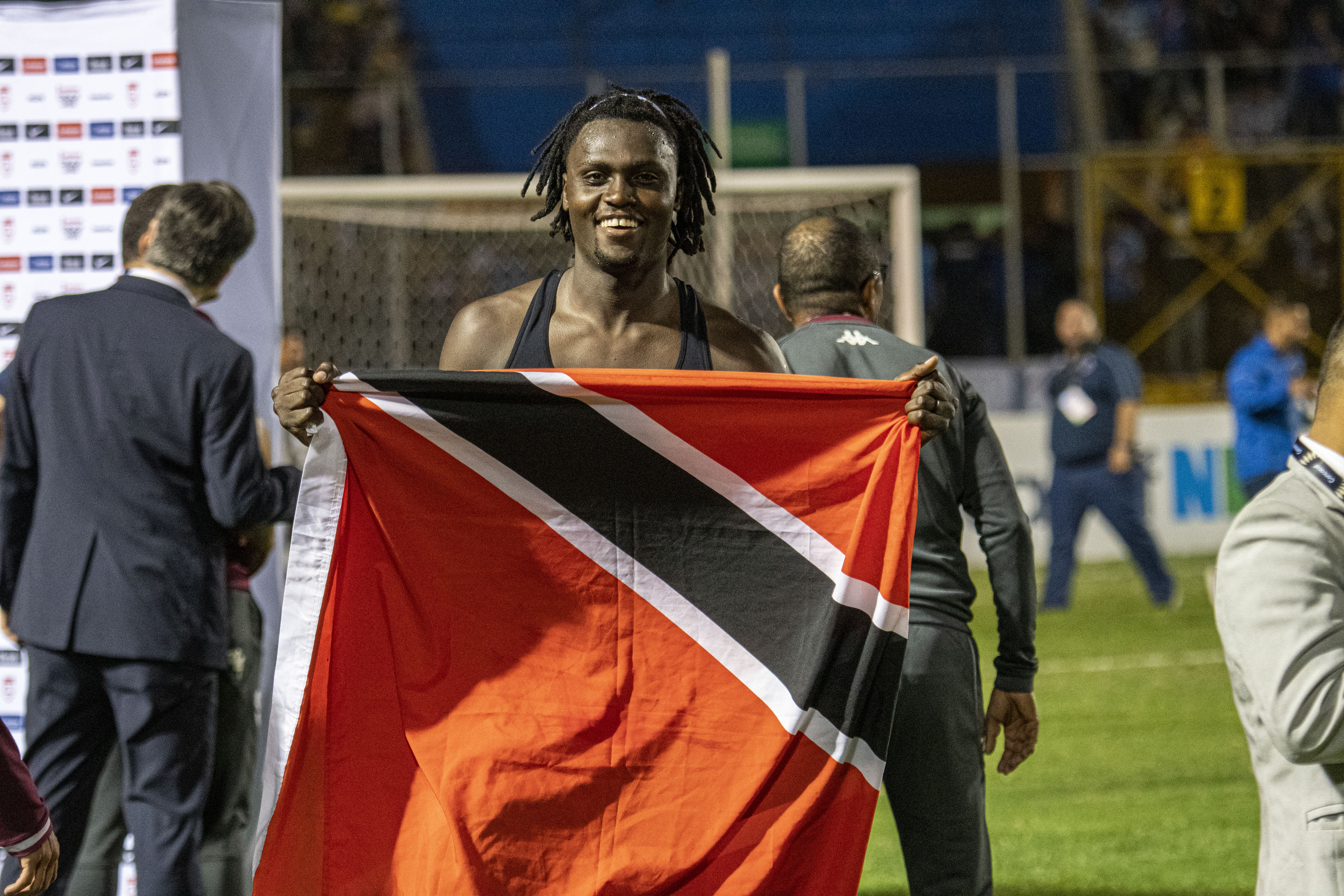
- David with Saprissa in 2019

Personal information
- Full name: Aubrey Robert David
- Date of birth: 11 October 1990 (age 36)
- Place of birth: Georgetown, Guyana
- Height: 1.91 m (6 ft 3 in)
- Position: Defender

Team information
- Current team: Municipal
- Number: 52

Youth career
- 2004–2008: Vessigny Government Secondary
- 2008–2009: W Connection

Senior career*
Years	Team	Apps	(Gls)
2009–2011	FC South End	0	(0)
2011	Joe Public	7	(0)
2011–2012	T&TEC	7	(1)
2012–2015	Caledonia AIA	23	(0)
2014	→ FF Jaro (loan)	31	(3)
2015	Shakhter Karagandy	19	(0)
2016–2017	Saprissa	17	(2)
2016	→ FC Dallas (loan)	5	(0)
2017	PS Kemi	25	(0)
2018	VPS	25	(1)
2019–2022	Saprissa	139	(5)
2022–2023	Alajuelense	26	(1)
2023	Aucas	9	(0)
2023–2024	Cartaginés	38	(2)
2024–	Municipal	41	(2)

International career^{‡}
2007	Trinidad and Tobago U17	5	(0)
2009	Trinidad and Tobago U20	3	(0)
2011	Trinidad and Tobago U23	2	(0)
2012	Guyana	1	(0)
2012–	Trinidad and Tobago	74	(1)
- * Club domestic league appearances and goals as of 18 May 2025 ‡ National team caps and goals as of 6 June 2024

Aubrey Robert David (born 11 October 1990) is a professional footballer who plays as a defender for Liga Guate club Municipal. Born in Guyana, he plays for the Trinidad and Tobago national team.

David began his professional football career in 2009, at the age of 18, with FC South End in Trinidad and Tobago. In the middle of his second season with the club, he transferred to fellow TT Pro League club Joe Public. However, after the Eastern Lions withdrew from the league at the end of the season, David signed with the Electricity Boys of promoted club T&TEC. In July 2012, he decided to switch to Caledonia AIA and won the FA Trophy in 2012–13. In his second season with the Stallions, he was loaned to FF Jaro for the 2014 Veikkausliiga season.

David is an international footballer having made his debut for Trinidad and Tobago in February 2012. However, David also represented his native Guyana in friendlies against Jamaica and Panama in May 2012, before making a one-time switch back to the Soca Warriors in November 2012. David helped lead Trinidad and Tobago to the 2007 FIFA U-17 World Cup and the 2009 FIFA U-20 World Cup as a youth; and most recently represented the senior team at the 2013 CONCACAF Gold Cup.

== Club career ==
=== Caledonia AIA ===
After his brief stint with the Golden Jaguars of Guyana in May 2012, David followed then national team manager Jamaal Shabazz to Pro League club Caledonia AIA prior to the 2012–13 season. He made his debut for the Stallions of Morvant/Laventille during the group stage of the 2012–13 CONCACAF Champions League against Seattle Sounders FC of Major League Soccer on 2 August 2012.

==== Loan to FF Jaro (2014) ====
On 26 February 2014, David traveled to Jakobstad for a trial with Finnish club FF Jaro of the Veikkausliiga.

During his two-week trial with the club, David made his debut for FF Jaro of the Veikkausliiga in a league cup match against SJK on 1 March 2014. After a solid performance, Aubrey joined the club on a one-year loan for the 2014 season after agreeing to personal terms. Two weeks later, David started in defence at left-back during a 2–1 defeat to Kakkonen club FC Hämeenlinna in the third round of the Suomen Cup. He made his league debut as a starter in defence for FF Jaro on 6 April in a 1–0 loss to HJK. David scored his first league goal for FF Jaro against KuPS in the 52nd minute after heading in a free kick from Hendrik Helmke on 19 April. Afterwards, he solidified a place as the left-back during the club's first ten matches to lead FF Jaro to third in the league table. Aubrey continued his consistent form over the next two months before yellow card accumulation ended his 18-consecutive match streak on 6 July 2014.

Two weeks later, Aubrey returned to score his second goal of the season in the 62nd minute during a 5–0 win over FC Honka.

=== Shakhter Karagandy ===
In February 2015, David went on trial with FC Shakhter Karagandy of the Kazakhstan Premier League, going on to sign a one-year contract with the option of a second.

=== Deportivo Saprissa ===
In December 2015, David signed with Deportivo Saprissa, the most successful club of the Costa Rican Primera División and CONCACAF, going on to sign a one-year contract with the option of a second.

=== FC Dallas ===
On June 28, 2016, Deportivo Saprissa announced David would go on a six-month loan to FC Dallas with an option to buy.

=== PS Kemi ===
On 26 February 2017, David signed for Palloseura Kemi Kings on a two-year contract.

=== VPS ===
On 6 February 2018, VPS announced the signing of David on a one-year contract.

=== Return to Deportivo Saprissa ===
On 17 December 2018, David rejoined Deportivo Saprissa for the 2019 season.

== International career ==
David has represented Trinidad and Tobago on various levels of international competition, having been capped for the under-17, under-20, under-23 Olympic team, and the Trinidad and Tobago national teams. He has also been capped for the Guyana national team in May 2012.

=== Youth teams ===
He began his international career for the under-17 team during the 2007 CONCACAF U-17 Tournament, where he made four appearances including two starts to lead the Soca Warriors to qualification for the 2007 FIFA U-17 World Cup in South Korea. David was part of the T&T outfit that beat Jamaica 1–0 in the final CONCACAF qualifying match in Kingston to qualify for the 2007 FIFA Under 17 World Cup in South Korea, that winning goal being scored by Kevin Molino.

During the 2007 FIFA U17 World Cup, David made one appearance after he came on as a late second-half substitute for Aaron Maund in Trinidad and Tobago's final match against Germany.

In March 2009, Aubrey represented the under-20 team as hosts during the 2009 CONCACAF U-20 Championship. David made two starts in a 1–0 win over Canada and in a scoreless draw against Costa Rica to secure qualification for the 2009 FIFA U-20 World Cup. Later that year, in Egypt, David came on as a substitute in the 63rd minute for Akeem Adams in a 2–1 loss to Italy, which eliminated the Soca Warriors from the competition. Two years later, David made two appearances in defence for the under-23 team during its Caribbean qualification phase for the CONCACAF Olympic qualification tournament in the United States. However, he did not make the final squad during the team's unsuccessful qualification for the 2012 Summer Olympics in London.

=== Senior teams ===
International appearances and goals
#	Date	Venue	Opponent	Result^{†}	Competition	Goal
2012
1	29 February	Sir Vivian Richards Stadium, North Sound	Antigua and Barbuda	4–0	International Match	
1	18 May	Montego Bay Sports Complex, Montego Bay	Jamaica	0–1	International Match	
2	20 May	Estadio Rommel Fernández, Panama City	Panama	0–2	International Match	
2	16 November	Dwight Yorke Stadium, Bacolet	Suriname	3–0	2012 Caribbean Cup qualification	1 (1)
3	18 November	Dwight Yorke Stadium, Bacolet	Cuba	1–0	2012 Caribbean Cup qualification	
4	7 December	Antigua Recreation Ground, St. John's	Haiti	0–0	2012 Caribbean Cup	
5	9 December	Antigua Recreation Ground, St. John's	Antigua and Barbuda	0–2	2012 Caribbean Cup	
6	11 December	Antigua Recreation Ground, St. John's	Dominican Republic	2–1	2012 Caribbean Cup	
7	16 December	Sir Vivian Richards Stadium, North Sound	Cuba	0–1	2012 Caribbean Cup	
2013
8	6 February	Ato Boldon Stadium, Couva	Peru	0–2	International Match	
9	26 March	Estadio Nacional, Lima	Peru	0–3	International Match	
10	7 June	A. Le Coq Arena, Tallinn	Estonia	0–1	International Match	
11	12 July	Sun Life Stadium, Miami	Haiti	0–2	2013 CONCACAF Gold Cup	
12	15 July	BBVA Compass Stadium, Houston	Honduras	2–0	2013 CONCACAF Gold Cup	
13	20 July	Georgia Dome, Atlanta	Mexico	0–1	2013 CONCACAF Gold Cup	
14	5 September	King Fahd International Stadium, Riyadh	United Arab Emirates	3–3	2013 OSN Cup	
15	15 November	Montego Bay Sports Complex, Montego Bay	Jamaica	1–0	International Match	
16	19 November	Hasely Crawford Stadium, Mucurapo	Jamaica	2–0	International Match	
^{†}Guyana's (aqua green) and Trinidad and Tobago's goal tally first.

David made his full international debut for the Trinidad and Tobago national team on 29 February 2012 against Antigua and Barbuda at the age of 21. However, following the Soca Warriors' elimination, at the hands of Guyana, from qualification attempt for the 2014 FIFA World Cup, David accepted an invitation to represent his native Guyana. In May 2012, David made his debut for the Golden Jaguars in a pair of friendlies against Jamaica and Panama. The following month, Aubrey did not feature for Guyana in the team's two losses against Mexico and Costa Rica during the third round of qualification. As a result, David decided to make a one-time international switch back to Trinidad and Tobago in November 2012.

==== 2013 CONCACAF Gold Cup ====
On 16 November 2012, David scored his first international goal in his return debut for the Soca Warriors in a 3–0 win against Suriname. Aubrey went on to receive five international caps to lead the national team through qualification and a runners-up finish in the 2012 Caribbean Cup to qualify for the country's first CONCACAF Gold Cup in six years. In the build-up to the Gold Cup, David appeared as a defender in a pair of friendlies against Peru in February and March 2013. He also started in a 1–0 loss to Estonia on 7 June during the national team's first visit to European soil since the 2006 FIFA World Cup in Germany. After the Gold Cup draw, Trinidad and Tobago entered Group B along with El Salvador, Haiti, and Honduras. Based on his performance in the previous friendlies, Aubrey was named in the final squad for the 2013 CONCACAF Gold Cup on 28 July.

Although David did not appear in the Soca Warriors' first group match against El Salvador, he came on as an early second-half substitute for injured Joevin Jones at left-back during the team's second match against Haiti. In the final group match between the Warriors and Honduras, David again replaced Jones as a late substitute to secure a 2–0 win and help Trinidad and Tobago advance to the quarterfinals for the first time since 2000. In the quarterfinals against Mexico, David made his first start of the tournament after Joevin Jones suffered from a hamstring injury prior to the match.

Post Gold Cup friendlies

Two months after the 2013 CONCACAF Gold Cup, Trinidad and Tobago accepted an invitation to compete in the 2013 OSN Cup in Saudi Arabia. David started in defence for the Soca Warriors during their semifinal match against United Arab Emirates. However, after Trinidad and Tobago conceded their third goal, Aubrey was substituted for Sheldon Bateau in the 55th minute. David was left off the roster, in favor of Bateau, for a friendly match against New Zealand in October 2013. David returned to the national team the following month and made consecutive starts during a pair of matches against Caribbean rivals Jamaica.

== Career statistics ==
=== Club ===
As of match played 27 October 2018

Appearances and goals by club, season and competition
Club	Season	League			National Cup		League Cup		Continental		Other		Total	
Club	Season	Division	Apps	Goals	Apps	Goals	Apps	Goals	Apps	Goals	Apps	Goals	Apps	Goals
South End	2009	TT Pro League	0	0	0	0	0	0	–		–		0	0
South End	2010–11	TT Pro League	0	0	0	0	0	0	–		–		0	0
South End	Total		0	0	0	0	0	0	-	-	-	-	0	0
Joe Public	2010–11	TT Pro League	7	0	0	0	0	0	–		–		7	0
T&TEC	2011–12	TT Pro League	7	1	0	0	0	0	–		–		7	1
Caledonia AIA	2012–13	TT Pro League	16	0	5	1	4	3	4	0	4	0	33	4
Caledonia AIA	2013–14	TT Pro League	7	0	0	0	1	0	4	0	0	0	12	0
Caledonia AIA	Total		23	0	5	1	5	3	8	0	4	0	45	4
FF Jaro	2014	Veikkausliiga	31	3	0	0	1	0	–		–		32	3
Shakhter Karagandy	2015	Kazakhstan Premier League	19	0	0	0	–		–		–		19	0
Deportivo Saprissa	2015–16	Liga FPD	17	2	–		–		–		–		17	2
Deportivo Saprissa	2016–17	Liga FPD	0	0	–		–		–		–		0	0
Deportivo Saprissa	Total		17	2	-	-	-	-	-	-	-	-	17	2
FC Dallas (loan)	2016	Major League Soccer	5	0	2	0	–		2	0	–		9	0
PS Kemi	2017	Veikkausliiga	25	0	0	0	–		–		–		25	0
VPS	2018	Veikkausliiga	25	1	4	0	–		–		–		29	1
Career total			159	7	11	0	6	3	10	0	4	0	190	10

=== International ===
As of match played 13 October 2015

==== International appearances ====
National team	Year	Fifa		Non-Fifa		Total	
National team	Year	Apps	Goals	Apps	Goals	Apps	Goals
Guyana	2012	1	0	1	0	2	0
Total		1	0	1	0	2	0
Trinidad and Tobago	2012	7	1	0	0	7	1
Trinidad and Tobago	2013	8	0	1	0	9	0
Trinidad and Tobago	2014	2	0	1	0	3	0
Trinidad and Tobago	2015	6	0	0	0	6	0
Total		23	1	2	0	25	1

==== International goals ====
Scores and results list Trinidad and Tobago's goal tally first.

#	Date	Venue	Cap	Opponent	Score	Result	Competition
1	16 November 2012	Dwight Yorke Stadium, Bacolet, Trinidad and Tobago	2	Suriname	3–0	3–0	2012 Caribbean Cup qualification

== Honours ==
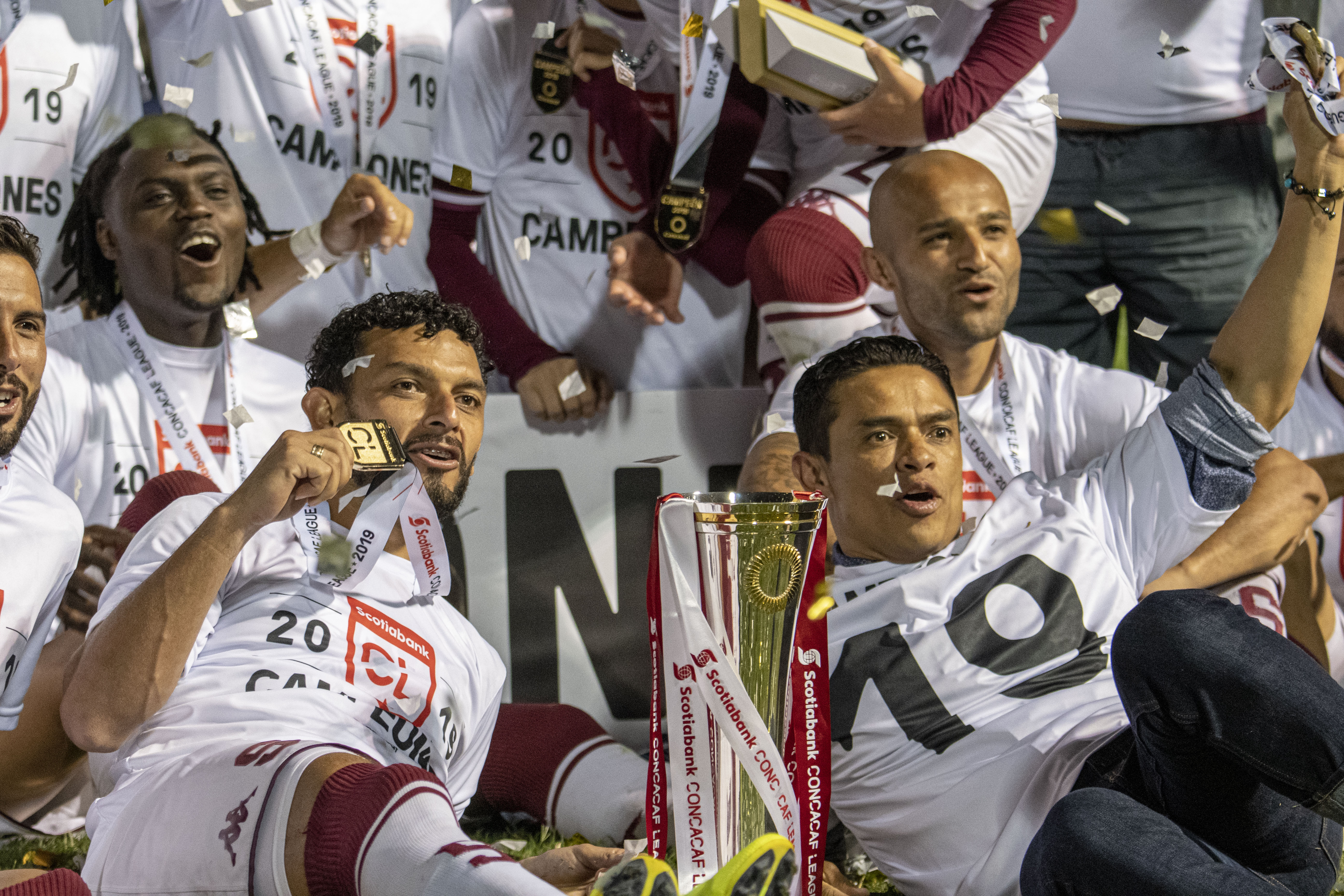
David (left) celebrating with Saprissa after winning the 2019 CONCACAF League

Joe Public

- Digicel Pro Bowl: 2011

Caledonia AIA

- FA Trophy: 2012–13

FC Dallas

- U.S. Open Cup: 2016
- Supporters' Shield: 2016

Saprissa

- Liga FPD: Clausura 2020, Clausura 2021
- CONCACAF League: 2019
