= Mikko Vilmunen =

Finnish footballer (born 1980)

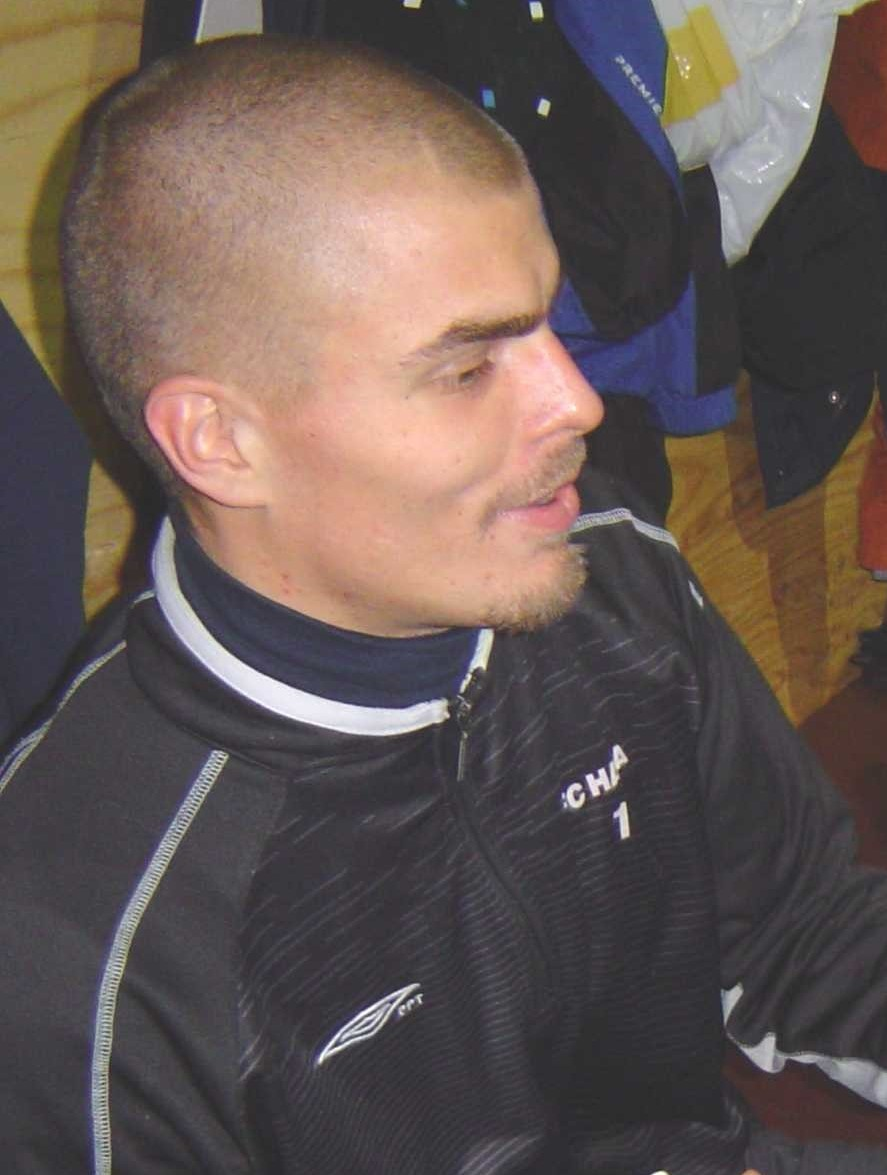
- Vilmunen in 2005

Personal information
- Date of birth: 23 August 1980 (age 46)
- Place of birth: Lempäälä, Finland
- Height: 1.87 m (6 ft 2 in)
- Position: Goalkeeper

Senior career*
Years	Team	Apps	(Gls)
2002–2006	Haka	92	(0)
2006–2008	Drogheda United	18	(0)
2008–2009	Alta	36	(0)
2010–2011	KuPS	34	(0)
2012	RoPS	25	(0)
2013–2018	PS Kemi	47	(0)
2019–2020	Kemi City	3	(0)

Managerial career
- 2019–2020: Kemi City (gk coach)
- 2021: Kemi City
- 2021: Kemi City (assistant)
- * Club domestic league appearances and goals

Mikko Vilmunen (born 23 August 1980) is a Finnish former professional footballer who played as a goalkeeper. He was instrumental in the Drogheda United's 2007 Setanta Cup win, saving two penalties in the shoot out against Linfield.

Vilmunen joined Drogheda United in November 2006 from Haka where he was first choice keeper.

In January 2017, Vilmunen extended his contract with Palloseura Kemi Kings for an additional season.

== Career statistics ==
Appearances and goals by club, season and competition
Club	Season	League			Cups (Note: Includes Suomen Cup, FAI Cup and League of Ireland Cup)		Europe		Total	
Club	Season	Division	Apps	Goals	Apps	Goals	Apps	Goals	Apps	Goals
Haka	2002	Veikkausliiga	16	0	0	0	0	0	16	0
Haka	2003	Veikkausliiga	3	0	0	0	0	0	3	0
Haka	2004	Veikkausliiga	25	0	0	0	4 (Note: Appearances in UEFA Cup)	0	29	0
Haka	2005	Veikkausliiga	26	0	1	0	4 (Note: Appearances in UEFA Champions League)	0	31	0
Haka	2006	Veikkausliiga	22	0	0	0	2	0	24	0
Haka	Total		92	0	1	0	10	0	103	0
Drogheda United	2007	LOI Premier Division	12	0	1	0	0	0	13	0
Drogheda United	2008	LOI Premier Division	6	0	2	0	0	0	8	0
Drogheda United	Total		18	0	3	0	0	0	21	0
Alta	2008	1. divisjon	9	0	0	0	–		9	0
Alta	2009	1. divisjon	27	0	0	0	–		27	0
Alta	Total		36	0	0	0	0	0	36	0
KuPS	2010	Veikkausliiga	22	0	1	0	–		23	0
KuPS	2011	Veikkausliiga	12	0	3	0	–		15	0
KuPS	Total		34	0	4	0	0	0	38	0
PK-37 (loan)	2011	Kakkonen	3	0	–		–		3	0
RoPS	2012	Ykkönen	25	0	–		–		25	0
PS Kemi	2013	Kakkonen	15	0	3	0	–		18	0
PS Kemi	2016	Veikkausliiga	11	0	–		–		11	0
PS Kemi	2017	Veikkausliiga	4	0	–		–		4	0
PS Kemi	2018	Veikkausliiga	16	0	2	0	–		18	0
PS Kemi	Total		46	0	5	0	0	0	51	0
FC Kemi	2016	Kolmonen	2	0	–		–		2	0
FC Kemi	2017	Kolmonen	1	0	–		–		1	0
FC Kemi	2018	Kolmonen	1	0	–		–		1	0
FC Kemi	Total		4	0	0	0	0	0	4	0
Kemi City	2019	Kolmonen	1	0	–		–		1	0
Kemi City	2020	Kakkonen	2	0	–		–		2	0
Kemi City	Total		3	0	0	0	0	0	3	0
Career total			261	0	13	0	10	0	284	0

== Honours ==
Haka:

- Veikkausliiga: 2004
- Finnish Cup: 2005

Drogheda United

- LOI Premier Division: 2007
- Setanta Cup: 2007
