= Matias Ojala =

Finnish footballer (born 1995)

Personal information
- Full name: Matias Petteri Ojala
- Date of birth: 28 February 1995 (age 31)
- Place of birth: Oulu, Finland
- Height: 1.73 m (5 ft 8 in)
- Position: Midfielder

Team information
- Current team: AC Oulu
- Number: 8

Youth career
- OLS
- Tervarit

Senior career*
Years	Team	Apps	(Gls)
2010–2015	AC Oulu	85	(11)
2013–2014	→ Hamburger SV II (loan)	14	(1)
2016–2017	PS Kemi	58	(0)
2018–2019	Ilves	36	(0)
2020–2023	Inter Turku	73	(8)
2024	IFK Mariehamn	21	(0)
2025–	AC Oulu	25	(0)

International career
2010–2011	Finland U17	6	(0)
2011–2013	Finland U19	8	(0)
2012–2013	Finland U18	2	(1)
2014	Finland U20	2	(0)
2014–2015	Finland U21	5	(0)
- * Club domestic league appearances and goals as of 12 November 2026

Matias Petteri Ojala (born 28 February 1995) is a Finnish footballer, who plays as a midfielder for AC Oulu in Finnish Veikkausliiga.

== Early career ==
Born and raised in Oulu, Ojala started his footballing career with local club AC Oulu, making his debut on Finnish top-flight on 12 August 2010, only at the age of 15. By doing this, he became the youngest player in history to make an appearance in Veikkausliiga.

He was however unable to make more appearances during the season as AC Oulu finished 11th. Because of their financial situation, the club however dropped down a level as they were denied a league license by the Finnish FA

This proved to be a good career point for Ojala, as he went on making 58 appearances and scoring 9 goals for Oulu during the next three seasons combined in the Finnish second division. During his final season with Oulu, he replaced the legendary Mika Nurmela as the team captain, only at the age of 18.

== Club career ==
On 27 August 2013, it was announced that Ojala had joined German Bundesliga side HSV on loan until summer 2014, with an option to buy. He was promoted to train with the first team for the first time in early October.

On 7 November 2019, FC Inter Turku confirmed the signing of Ojala for the 2020 season on a deal until the end of 2021.

On 22 December 2023, Ojala signed with fellow Veikkausliiga side IFK Mariehamn on a one-year deal.

On 3 November 2024, Ojala returned to his hometown Oulu and signed a two-year deal with his former club AC Oulu.

== Career statistics ==
As of 24 July 2026

Appearances and goals by club, season and competition
Club	Season	League			Cup		League cup		Europe		Total	
Club	Season	Division	Apps	Goals	Apps	Goals	Apps	Goals	Apps	Goals	Apps	Goals
AC Oulu	2010	Veikkausliiga	1	0	0	0	–		–		1	0
AC Oulu	2011	Ykkönen	19	2	0	0	1	0	–		20	2
AC Oulu	2012	Ykkönen	18	1	3	0	–		–		21	1
AC Oulu	2013	Ykkönen	21	6	0	0	–		–		21	6
AC Oulu	2014	Ykkönen	7	1	–		–		–		7	1
AC Oulu	2015	Ykkönen	19	1	4	0	–		–		23	1
AC Oulu	Total		85	11	7	0	1	0	0	0	93	11
Hamburger SV II (loan)	2013–14	Regionalliga Nord	14	1	–		–		–		14	1
PS Kemi	2016	Veikkausliiga	30	0	2	0	0	0	–		32	0
PS Kemi	2017	Veikkausliiga	28	0	5	1	–		–		33	1
PS Kemi	Total		58	0	7	1	0	0	0	0	65	1
Ilves	2018	Veikkausliiga	23	0	5	0	–		2 (Note: Appearances in UEFA Europa League)	0	30	0
Ilves	2019	Veikkausliiga	13	0	8	2	–		–		21	2
Ilves	Total		36	0	13	2	0	0	2	0	51	2
Inter Turku	2020	Veikkausliiga	14	1	6	1	–		1	0	21	2
Inter Turku	2021	Veikkausliiga	27	5	5	0	–		1 (Note: Appearances in UEFA Conference League)	0	33	5
Inter Turku	2022	Veikkausliiga	11	0	4	0	4	0	0	0	19	0
Inter Turku	2023	Veikkausliiga	21	2	3	0	1	0	–		25	2
Inter Turku	Total		73	8	18	1	5	0	2	0	98	9
IFK Mariehamn	2024	Veikkausliiga	21	0	2	1	5	0	–		28	1
AC Oulu	2025	Veikkausliiga	13	0	4	0	4	0	–		21	0
AC Oulu	2026	Veikkausliiga	6	0	0	0	6	1	–		12	1
AC Oulu	Total		19	8	4	0	10	1	0	0	33	1
Career total			306	28	51	5	21	1	4	0	382	26

== Honours ==
Ilves

- Finnish Cup: 2019

Inter Turku

- Finnish Cup runner-up: 2022
- Finnish League Cup runner-up: 2022
