= Oskari Forsman =

Finnish footballer (born 1988)

Personal information
- Full name: Oskari Jussi Forsman
- Date of birth: 28 January 1988 (age 38)
- Place of birth: Oulu, Finland
- Height: 1.87 m (6 ft 2 in)
- Position: Goalkeeper

Senior career*
Years	Team	Apps	(Gls)
2006–2008	Inter Turku	6	(0)
2009–2011	KooTeePee	44	(0)
2010	→ OPS (loan)	25	(0)
2012	Jazz	27	(0)
2013–2014	RoPS	11	(0)
2013	→ TP-47 (loan)	5	(0)
2015–2016	TPS	50	(0)
2017–2018	PS Kemi	44	(0)
2018	Lahti	9	(0)
2019–2021	IFK Mariehamn	78	(0)
2022	VPS	23	(0)
2023–2024	Tallinna Kalev	70	(0)
- * Club domestic league appearances and goals

Oskari Jussi Forsman (born 28 January 1988) is a Finnish football coach and former professional player who played as a goalkeeper.

== Club career ==
In his native Finland, Forsman has played in the three highest tiers Veikkausliiga, Ykkönen and Kakkonen. In Veikkausliiga, he has represented Inter Turku, RoPS, PS Kemi, Lahti and IFK Mariehamn.

On 29 December 2021, he signed with Vaasan Palloseura (VPS) for the 2022 Veikkausliiga season.

In January 2023 he started playing for Tallinna Kalev in Estonian Meistriliiga. At the end of the 2023 Meistriliiga season, Forsman was named in the Team of the Year, chosen by the fans. Forsman was also named The Best Goalkeeper and The Best Recruit of the Season. Kalev also qualified for the 2024–25 UEFA Conference League qualifiers, their first appearance in the European competitions in the club's entire history. On 28 November 2023, his contract was extended for the 2024 season. While playing, Forsman worked also as a goalkeeping coach for the club. He announced his retirement as a professional player after the 2024 season.

== Career statistics ==
As of 10 November 2024.

Appearances and goals by club, season and competition
Club	Season	League			National cup (Note: Includes Suomen Cup and Estonian Cup)		League cup (Note: Includes Finnish League Cup)		Continental		Total	
Club	Season	Division	Apps	Goals	Apps	Goals	Apps	Goals	Apps	Goals	Apps	Goals
Inter Turku	2007	Veikkausliiga	1	0	0	0	–		–		1	0
Inter Turku	2008	Veikkausliiga	5	0	0	0	–		–		5	0
Inter Turku	Total		6	0	0	0	–	–	–	–	6	0
KooTeePee	2009	Ykkönen	24	0	0	0	–		–		24	0
KooTeePee	2010	Ykkönen	0	0	0	0	–		–		0	0
KooTeePee	2011	Ykkönen	21	0	0	0	–		–		21	0
KooTeePee	Total		45	0	0	0	–	–	–	–	45	0
OPS (loan)	2010	Ykkönen	25	0	0	0	–		–		25	0
IFK Mariehamn	2012	Veikkausliiga	0	0	0	0	1	0	–		1	0
Jazz	2012	Kakkonen	27	0	2	0	–		–		29	0
RoPS	2013	Veikkausliiga	9	0	3	0	4	0	–		16	0
RoPS	2014	Veikkausliiga	2	0	2	0	3	0	1 (Note: Includes UEFA Europa League)	0	8	0
RoPS	Total		11	0	5	0	7	0	1	0	24	0
TP-47 (loan)	2013	Kakkonen	5	0	–		–		–		5	0
TPS	2015	Ykkönen	27	0	3	0	–		–		30	0
TPS	2016	Ykkönen	25	0	1	0	–		–		26	0
TPS	Total		52	0	4	0	–	–	–	–	56	0
PS Kemi	2017	Veikkausliiga	29	0	5	0	–		–		34	0
PS Kemi	2018	Veikkausliiga	15	0	3	0	–		–		18	0
PS Kemi	Total		44	0	8	0	–	–	–	–	52	0
Lahti	2018	Veikkausliiga	9	0	–		–		1	0	10	0
IFK Mariehamn	2019	Veikkausliiga	31	0	9	0	–		–		40	0
IFK Mariehamn	2020	Veikkausliiga	22	0	4	0	–		–		26	0
IFK Mariehamn	2021	Veikkausliiga	25	0	3	0	–		–		28	0
IFK Mariehamn	Total		78	0	16	0	–	–	–	–	94	0
VPS	2022	Veikkausliiga	23	0	0	0	1	0	–		24	0
Tallinna Kalev	2023	Meistriliiga	35	0	0	0	–		–		35	0
Tallinna Kalev	2024	Meistriliiga	35	0	1	0	2	0	2 (Note: Appearances in UEFA Conference League)	0	40	0
Tallinna Kalev	Total		70	0	1	0	2	0	2	0	75	0
Career total			395	0	36	0	11	0	4	0	446	0

== Honours ==
Inter Turku

- Veikkausliiga: 2008

RoPS

- Finnish Cup: 2013

TPS

- Ykkönen runner-up: 2019

IFK Mariehamn

- Finnish Cup runner-up: 2019
