= Albion Ademi =

Albanian footballer (born 1999)

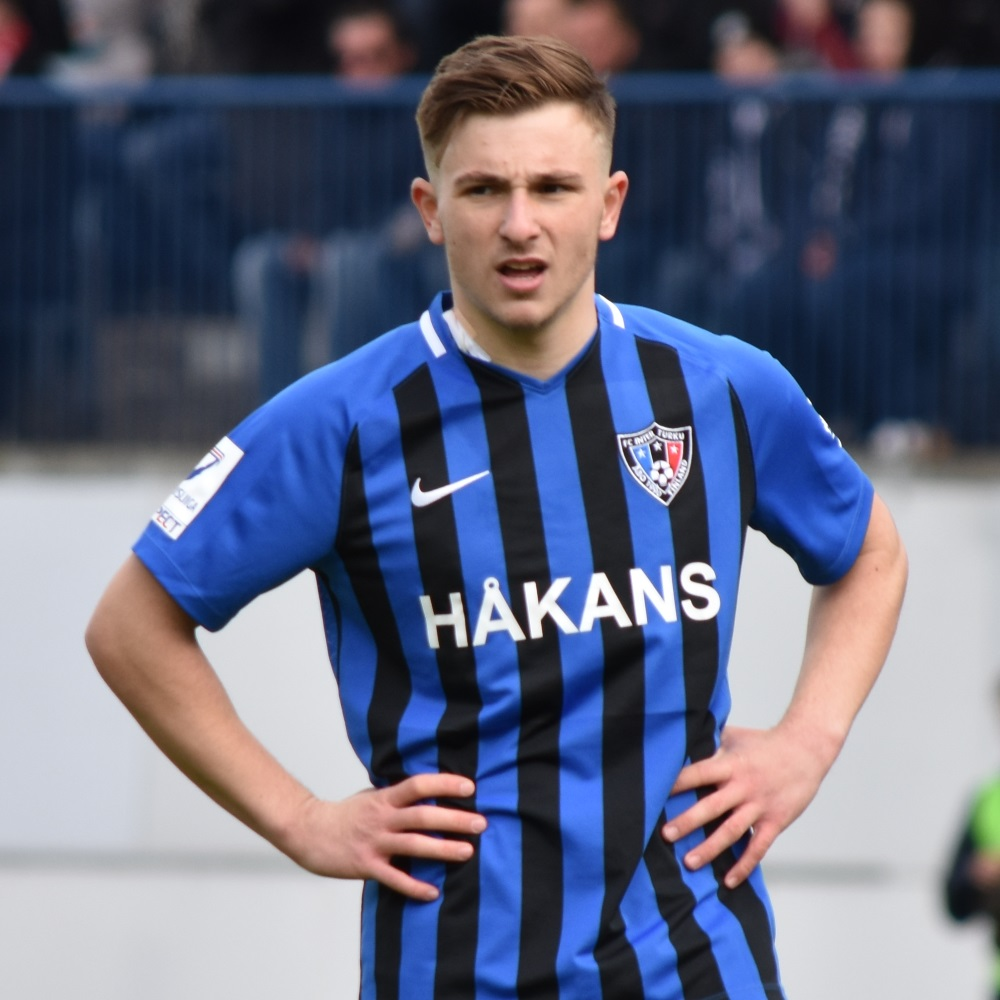
- Ademi with Inter Turku in 2018

Personal information
- Date of birth: 19 February 1999 (age 27)
- Place of birth: Pristina, FR Yugoslavia
- Height: 1.73 m (5 ft 8 in)
- Position: Winger

Team information
- Current team: Shenzhen Peng City
- Number: 11

Youth career
- TPS

Senior career*
Years	Team	Apps	(Gls)
2015	TPS	10	(2)
2016–2019	Inter Turku	41	(5)
2016	→ EIF (loan)	2	(0)
2017	→ EIF (loan)	2	(0)
2017	→ PS Kemi (loan)	14	(2)
2020	IFK Mariehamn	22	(14)
2021–2023	Djurgården	11	(0)
2022	→ Lahti (loan)	14	(0)
2023	→ IFK Värnamo (loan)	27	(3)
2024	IFK Värnamo	0	(0)
2024–2025	Tianjin Jinmen Tiger	50	(13)
2026–	Shenzhen Peng City	19	(3)

International career
2015	Finland U16	2	(1)
2015–2016	Finland U17	5	(0)
2016	Finland U18	2	(0)
2017–2018	Finland U19	11	(0)
2018–2020	Albania U21	5	(0)
- * Club domestic league appearances and goals as of 20:37, 11 November 2026 (UTC)

Albion Ademi (born 19 February 1999) is a professional footballer who plays for Chinese Super League club Shenzhen Peng City as a winger. Ademi has represented both Finland and Albania at youth international level.

== Club career ==
Ademi spent his early career with TPS, Inter Turku, EIF and PS Kemi, playing in the second-tier Ykkönen and first-tier Veikkausliiga.

On 30 December 2019, Ademi signed a one-year contract with IFK Mariehamn.

He moved to Swedish club Djurgården on a four-year deal in January 2021, for a transfer fee of around €200,000 plus bonuses. On 25 March 2022, Ademi returned to Veikkausliiga and joined FC Lahti on loan until mid-July 2022. After spending the 2023 season on loan in IFK Värnamo, the club announced his permanent transfer to Värnamo on a deal until 2026, starting in 2024, for a fee of kr800,000, which is roughly around €70,000.

However, on 14 February 2024, Ademi signed with Chinese Super League club Tianjin Jinmen Tiger from IFK Värnamo. The transfer fee was announced to be kr5.5 million, which corresponds to around €500,000, which is the highest incoming fee in IFK Värnamo's history. On 2 March 2024, Ademi debuted in the league with his new club, scoring the only goal for his side, in a 1–1 draw against Nantong Zhiyun.

On 4 January 2026, Ademi joined Chinese Super League club Shenzhen Peng City.

== International career ==
Ademi represented Finland at under-17 and under-19 youth levels. With the under-19 squad, he played two games at the 2018 UEFA European Under-19 Championship, which Finland hosted.

On 31 August 2018, Ademi received a call-up from the Albania U21 national team for a friendly match against Italy U21 and made his debut after being named in the starting line-up.

On 5 October 2018, Ademi received a call-up from Albania U21 for the 2019 UEFA European Under-21 Championship qualification matches against Spain U21 and Estonia U21. He joined up with the team however was unable to play due to him having to wait for FIFA's permission.

In November 2018, he received his first call-up to the senior Albania national football team for UEFA Nations League game against Scotland and a friendly against Wales, but remained on the bench in both games.

== Personal life ==
Ademi was born in Kosovo, but relocated to Finland with his family due to Kosovo War in 1999, when he was a few months old. He was raised in Runosmäki neighbourhood of Turku.

== Career statistics ==
As of match played 8 November 2026

Appearances and goals by club, season and competition
Club	Season	League			Cup (Note: Includes Suomen Cup, Svenska Cupen and Chinese FA Cup)		Continental		Total	
Club	Season	Division	Apps	Goals	Apps	Goals	Apps	Goals	Apps	Goals
TPS	2015	Ykkönen	10	2	1	0	—		11	2
Inter Turku	2016	Veikkausliiga	2	0	—		—		2	0
Inter Turku	2017	Veikkausliiga	3	0	5	2	—		8	2
Inter Turku	2018	Veikkausliiga	25	4	6	6	—		31	10
Inter Turku	2019	Veikkausliiga	11	1	—		1 (Note: Appearance in UEFA Europa League)	0	12	1
Inter Turku	Total		41	5	11	8	1	0	53	13
EIF (loan)	2016	Ykkönen	2	0	—		—		2	0
EIF (loan)	2017	Ykkönen	2	0	—		—		2	0
EIF (loan)	Total		4	0	—		—		4	0
PS Kemi (loan)	2017	Veikkausliiga	14	2	—		—		14	2
IFK Mariehamn	2020	Veikkausliiga	22	14	4	0	—		26	14
Djurgården	2021	Allsvenskan	8	0	5	0	—		13	0
Djurgården	2022	Allsvenskan	3	0	3	2	2 (Note: Appearance in UEFA Europa Conference League)	0	8	2
Djurgården	Total		11	0	8	2	2	0	21	2
Lahti (loan)	2022	Veikkausliiga	14	0	4	1	—		18	1
IFK Värnamo (loan)	2023	Allsvenskan	27	3	1	1	—		28	4
IFK Värnamo	2024	Allsvenskan	0	0	0	0	–		0	0
Tianjin Jinmen Tiger	2024	Chinese Super League	30	9	2	0	—		32	9
Tianjin Jinmen Tiger	2025	Chinese Super League	20	4	—		—		20	4
Tianjin Jinmen Tiger	Total		50	13	2	0	—		52	13
Shenzhen Peng City	2026	Chinese Super League	19	3	1	0	—		20	3
Career total			212	32	32	12	3	0	247	54

== Honours ==
Inter Turku

- Finnish Cup: 2017–18

Individual

- Veikkausliiga Team of the Year: 2020
- Veikkausliiga Player of the Month: August 2020
