= Kevin Tano =

Dutch footballer (born 1993)

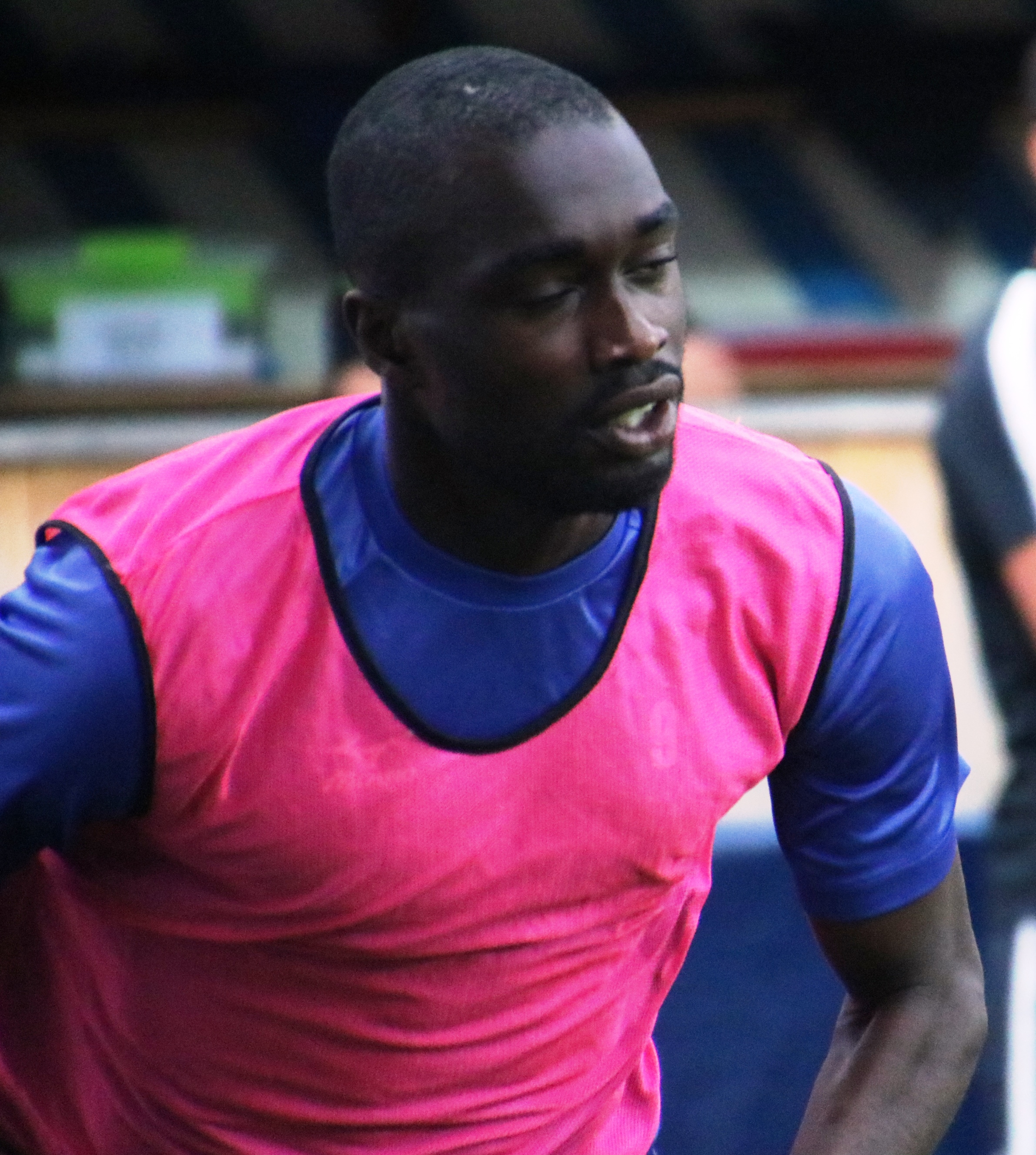
- Tano in 2016

Personal information
- Date of birth: 5 December 1992 (age 33)
- Place of birth: Amsterdam, Netherlands
- Height: 1.89 m (6 ft 2 1/2 in)
- Position: Striker

Team information
- Current team: Akritas Chlorakas
- Number: 7

Youth career
- CTO '70
- FC Utrecht

Senior career*
| Years | Team | Apps | (Gls) |
| 2010–2011 | FC Volendam | 4 | (0) |
| 2011–2013 | ADO Den Haag | 0 | (0) |
| 2011–2012 | → FC Dordrecht (loan) | 18 | (0) |
| 2013 | → FC Dordrecht (loan) | 3 | (0) |
| 2013–2015 | Royal Antwerp | 43 | (7) |
| 2015–2016 | Maccabi Herzliya | 35 | (4) |
| 2016–2017 | SV Horn | 14 | (2) |
| 2017–2018 | PS Kemi | 25 | (2) |
| 2019– | Akritas Chlorakas | 15 | (4) |
- * Club domestic league appearances and goals as of 21:21, 16 February 2020 (UTC)

Kevin Tano (born 17 April 1993 in Amsterdam) is a Dutch footballer who plays for Akritas Chlorakas. He formerly played for FC Volendam, ADO Den Haag and FC Dordrecht.

== Career ==
=== Akritas Chlorakas ===
Leaving PS Kemi at the end of 2018, Tano joined Cypriot club Akritas Chlorakas in September 2019.
