= Joonas Ikäläinen =

Finnish footballer (born 1982)

Personal information
- Date of birth: 5 January 1982 (age 44)
- Place of birth: Kemi, Finland
- Height: 1.89 m (6 ft 2 1/2 in)
- Position: Defender

Team information
- Current team: PS Kemi
- Number: 8

Youth career
- FC-88
- 1999: KPT-85
- 1999: KePS
- 2000: PS Kemi

Senior career*
Years	Team	Apps	(Gls)
2001–2004	PS Kemi	72	(9)
2004–2005	TP-47	27	(2)
2006–2008	VPS	60	(4)
2009	RoPS	25	(2)
2010–	PS Kemi		
- * Club domestic league appearances and goals as of 30 June 2010

Joonas Ikäläinen (born 5 January 1982) is a Finnish football player currently playing for PS Kemi; he formerly played for PS Kemi, TP-47, VPS and RoPS.
