= Iiro Aalto =

Finnish footballer (born 1977)

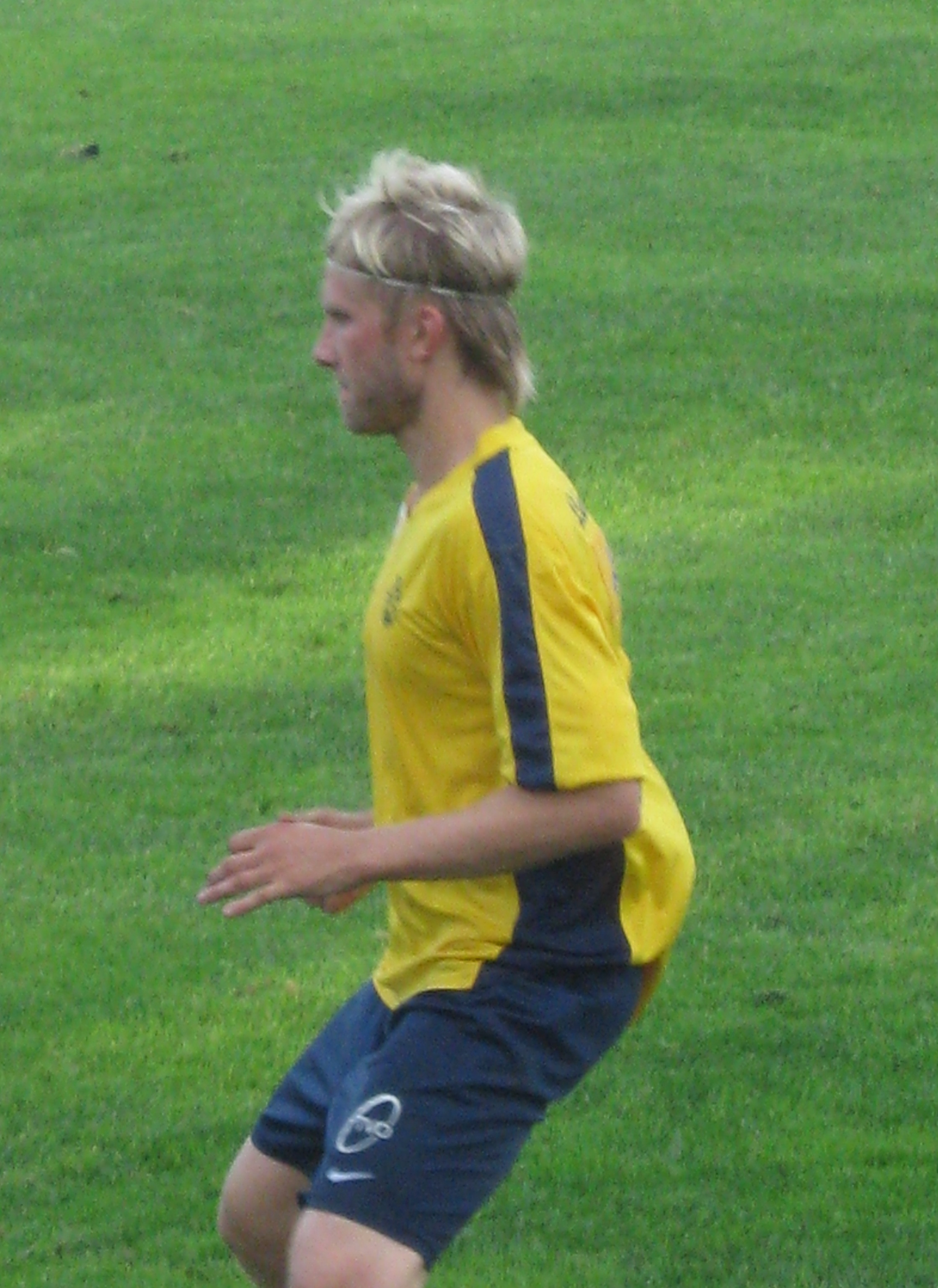

Personal information
- Full name: Iiro Aalto
- Date of birth: 19 July 1977 (age 49)
- Place of birth: Rauma, Finland
- Height: 1.80 m (5 ft 11 in)
- Position: Left-back

Senior career*
Years	Team	Apps	(Gls)
1995–1998	Pallo-Iirot	64	(1)
1998–1999	KajHa	9	(0)
1999–2000	Pallo-Iirot	9	(0)
2001–2002	Haka	49	(0)
2002	Pallo-Sepot 44	3	(0)
2003–2007	HJK	112	(1)
2007–2008	Olympiakos Nicosia	6	(0)
2008	Tampere United	6	(0)
2008–2010	TPS	31	(0)
2010	→ PoPa (loan)	5	(0)
2010–2015	Pallo-Iirot	130	(12)

International career^{‡}
	Finland	2	(0)
- * Club domestic league appearances and goals as of 14 October 2009 ‡ National team caps and goals as of 14 October 2009

Iiro Aalto (born 19 July 1977) is a Finnish former footballer who played as a left-back.

He started his career with Finnish football club Pallo-Iirot, then moved to FC Haka and spent most of his career at Helsingin Jalkapalloklubi but from December 2007 played for Cypriot club Olympiakos Nicosia. He started his career in Pallo-Iirot.

Aalto returned to Finland in May 2008 to play for Tampere United. After his loan spell at Tampere he moved to TPS Turku.

His brother Jussi is also a former footballer.
