= Omar Jama =

Finnish footballer (born 1998)

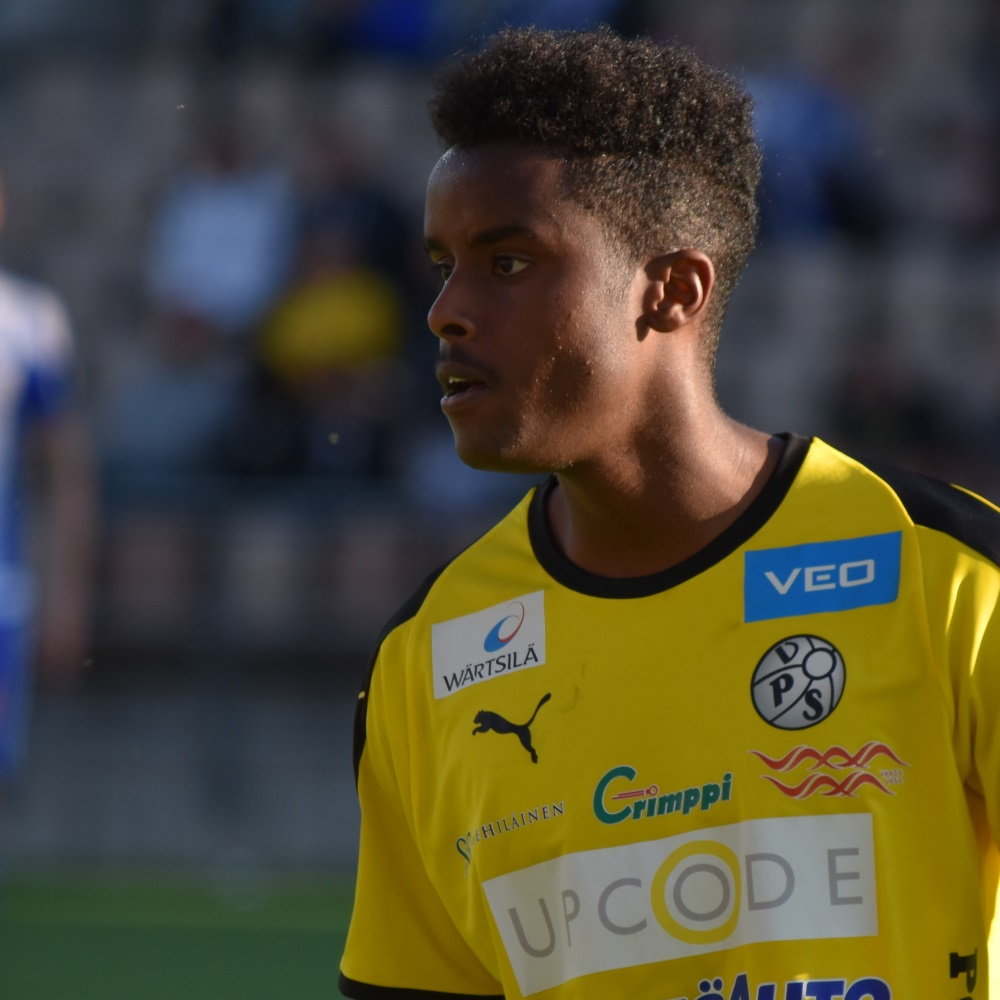
- Jama with VPS in 2018.

Personal information
- Full name: Omar Hassan Jama
- Date of birth: 21 May 1998 (age 28)
- Place of birth: Helsinki, Finland
- Height: 1.75 m (5 ft 9 in)
- Position: Midfielder

Team information
- Current team: JäPS
- Number: 6

Youth career
- –2015: HJK

Senior career*
Years	Team	Apps	(Gls)
2015	HJK	0	(0)
2015–2017	Klubi 04	40	(3)
2017–2018	PS Kemi	26	(1)
2018	VPS	21	(1)
2019	EIF	25	(2)
2020–2021	IF Gnistan	39	(1)
2022	PK-35	23	(0)
2023–	JäPS	91	(4)

International career^{‡}
2013	Finland U15		
2014	Finland U16	2	(0)
2014–2015	Finland U17	10	(0)
2016	Finland U18	6	(0)
2021–	Somalia	4	(0)
- * Club domestic league appearances and goals as of 1 November 2026 ‡ National team caps and goals as of 24 November 2025

Omar Hassan Jama (born 21 May 1998) is a footballer who plays as a midfielder for Ykkönen side JäPS. Born in Finland, he represents Somalia internationally.

== Club career ==
Jama joined PS Kemi in January 2017 from Kakkonen side Klubi 04. In 2019, Jama joined Ekenäs IF for a season, before moving to IF Gnistan the following year.

== International career ==
After representing Finland on junior levels, in 2021 he was called up to the Somalia national team and made his debut on 20 June 2021 in an Arab Cup qualifier against Oman.

== Career statistics ==
As of 12 April 2018

Appearances and goals by club, season and competition
Club	Season	League			Finnish Cup		Finnish League Cup		Other		Total	
Club	Season	Division	Apps	Goals	Apps	Goals	Apps	Goals	Apps	Goals	Apps	Goals
HJK	2015	Veikkausliiga	0	0	1	1	0	0	0	0	1	1
Klubi 04	2015	Kakkonen	19	1	0	0	0	0	0	0	19	1
Klubi 04	2016	Kakkonen	21	2	0	0	0	0	0	0	21	2
PS Kemi	2017	Veikkausliiga	26	1	4	0	0	0	0	0	30	1
Vaasan Palloseura	2018	Veikkausliiga	1	0	6	0	0	0	0	0	7	0
Career total			67	4	11	1	0	0	0	0	78	5
