= Nicolae Vasile =

Romanian footballer

Personal information
- Full name: Nicolae Vasile
- Date of birth: 29 December 1995 (age 30)
- Place of birth: Bucharest, Romania
- Position: Wing-back

Youth career
- Rapid București

Senior career*
Years	Team	Apps	(Gls)
2013–2016	Rapid București	62	(0)
2016	PS Kemi	5	(0)
2017–2018	Arandina	3	(0)
2018–2019	UE Sant Julià	37	(0)

International career
2013–2014	Romania U-19	11	(0)
2015	Romania U-21	1	(0)
- * Club domestic league appearances and goals as of 18 May 2016

Nicolae Vasile (born 29 December 1995) is a Romanian professional footballer who last played for Arandina CF in the Spanish Tercera División. He debuted in Liga I for Rapid in the 1–0 win against CSMS Iaşi.

== Career ==
=== Club ===
On 9 September 2016, Vasile signed for PS Kemi on a contract until the end of the 2017 season.
