= Edwin Salazar =

Colombian footballer (born 1991)

Personal information
- Full name: Edwin Ernesto Salazar Ruiz
- Date of birth: 6 August 1991 (age 35)
- Place of birth: Buenaventura, Colombia
- Height: 1.87 m (6 ft 2 in)
- Position: Forward

Team information
- Current team: Rocha
- Number: 14

Senior career*
Years	Team	Apps	(Gls)
2016–2017	Orsomarso	12	(1)
2017	→ PS Kemi (loan)	13	(1)
2018	PEPO	10	(4)
2019–	Rocha	12	(1)
2020	→ Costa del Este (loan)	6	(0)
- * Club domestic league appearances and goals as of 6 October 2021

Edwin Ernesto Salazar Ruiz (born 6 August 1991) is a Colombian footballer who plays as a forward for Rocha in Uruguay.

== Club career ==
Salazar joined Finnish Veikkausliiga side PS Kemi on a one-year loan from Colombian Categoría Primera B side Orsomarso in February 2017.

== Career statistics ==
=== Club ===
As of 22 December 2018.

Club	Season	League			Cup		Continental		Other		Total	
Club	Season	Division	Apps	Goals	Apps	Goals	Apps	Goals	Apps	Goals	Apps	Goals
Orsomarso	2016	Categoría Primera B	12	1	3 (Note: Appearances in the Copa Colombia)	1	–		0	0	15	2
PS Kemi (loan)	2017	Veikkausliiga	13	1	1 (Note: Appearances in the Finnish Cup)	0	–		0	0	14	1
PEPO	2018	Kakkonen	10	4	4	2	–		0	0	14	6
Career total			35	6	8	3	0	0	0	0	43	9
