= Eduard Zea =

Colombian footballer (born 1990)

Personal information
- Full name: Eduard Stihivinson Zea Chávez
- Date of birth: 19 January 1990 (age 36)
- Place of birth: Quibdó, Colombia
- Height: 1.84 m (6 ft 0 in)
- Position: Centre back

Youth career
- –2009: Deportes Quindío

Senior career*
Years	Team	Apps	(Gls)
2009–2014	Deportes Quindío	18	(1)
2009	→ América de Cali (loan)	6	(0)
2011	→ La Equidad (loan)	10	(0)
2015	San Antonio Scorpions	0	(0)
2015–2016	Phoenix Rising	10	(0)
2016	Unión Magdalena	7	(0)
2017	PS Kemi	15	(1)

International career
2007	Colombia U17	4	(0)
- * Club domestic league appearances and goals as of 21 January 2018

Eduard Stihivinson Zea Chávez (born 19 January 1990) is a Colombian footballer who most recently played for PS Kemi.

== Career ==
Born in Quibdó, Chocó, Zea began playing football as a central defender with Deportes Quindío. After joining the senior side, he spent much of his early years going on loan to América de Cali and La Equidad to get more playing opportunities. In 2012, he returned to Deportes Quindio, where he broke into the first team during the 2013 season.

Zea played for Colombia at the 2007 FIFA U-17 World Cup finals in South Korea.
