= Jussi Aalto =

Finnish footballer (born 1983)

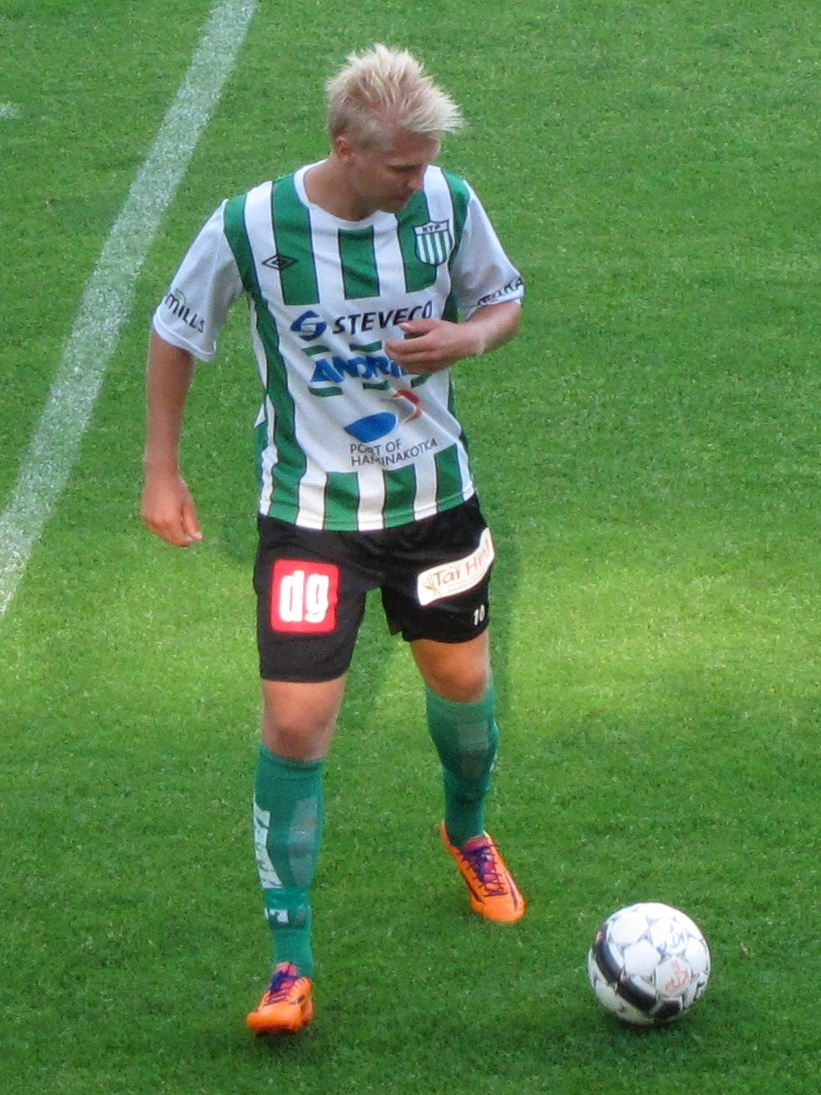

Personal information
- Date of birth: 28 July 1983 (age 43)
- Place of birth: Rauma, Finland
- Height: 1.83 m (6 ft 0 in)
- Position: Forward

Team information
- Current team: FC Jazz
- Number: 10

Youth career
- 1995–2002: Pallo-Iirot

Senior career*
Years	Team	Apps	(Gls)
2004	Pallo-Iirot	46	(25)
2005–2006	HJK Helsinki	19	(3)
2005–2006	→ Klubi-04 (loan)	9	(4)
2007–2008	FF Jaro	47	(11)
2008	→ JBK (loan)	1	(1)
2009–2010	VPS	40	(8)
2011–2012	FF Jaro	50	(6)
2013	FC Haka	24	(15)
2014	SJK	0	(0)
2014	→ KTP (loan)	26	(25)
2015	TPS	26	(11)
2016	KTP	26	(15)
2017	PS Kemi	8	(1)
2017–2019	Pallo-Iirot	32	(12)
2019–2020	FC Jazz	27	(17)
2021	Pallo-Iirot	14	(3)
- * Club domestic league appearances and goals as of 14:42, 26 November 2021 (UTC)

Jussi Aalto (born 28 July 1983) is a Finnish former professional footballer who played as a forward. Aalto represented a number of teams in Finland including Helsingin Jalkapalloklubi (HJK Helsinki), Vaasan Palloseura (VPS) and Seinäjoen Jalkapallokerho (SJK).

== Early life ==
Aalto was born on 28 July 1983 in Rauma, Finland.

Aalto's elder brother, Iiro Aalto, is also a former professional football.

== Career ==
Aalto began his professional career with local team Pallo-Iirot which played in the Kakkonen (Second Division) in 2003. He played for the club in the Ykkönen (First Division) in 2004 before moving to Helsingin Jalkapalloklubi (HJK Helsinki) in 2005. Aalto played alongside his elder brother Iiro while at HJK Helsinki. However, Aalto received little playing time while at HJK Helsinki making just 19 appearances in two season. While Aalto was playing for them, HJK finished as runners-up in the Veikkausliiga (Premier Division) in both the 2005 and 2006 seasons. They also reached the Finnish Cup final in 2006 and defeated Kokkolan Palloveikot to lift the trophy.

In 2007, Aalto moved to FF Jaro where he spent two seasons again playing in the Veikkausliiga.

Aalto would go on to play for Vaasan Palloseura (VPS), Seinäjoen Jalkapallokerho (SJK) and Palloseura Kemi Kings (PS Kemi) in the Veikkausliiga and FC Haka in the Ykkönen.

On 21 December 2015, KTP announced that they had signed Aalto for the 2016 season in Ykkönen.

== After football ==
Aalto ended his professional career in 2017. Although he continued to play for a few more years, he became an estate agent at OP Financial Group.
