= Faith Friday Obilor =

Nigerian footballer (born 1991)

Personal information
- Full name: Faith Friday Obilor
- Date of birth: 5 March 1991 (age 35)
- Place of birth: Aba, Nigeria
- Height: 1.91 m (6 ft 3 in)
- Position: Centre-back

Team information
- Current team: Penang
- Number: 55

Senior career*
Years	Team	Apps	(Gls)
2011	RoPS	21	(0)
2012	→ Inter Turku (loan)	4	(0)
2013–2015	RoPS	89	(8)
2016	Inter Turku	31	(2)
2017–2019	HJK	73	(2)
2020	Sheriff Tiraspol	12	(0)
2021	Taraz	15	(1)
2021–2022	Aksu	30	(2)
2023	Pyunik	1	(0)
2023–2024	Northeast United	0	(0)
2024–2025	PDRM FC	22	(0)
2025–	Penang	19	(2)
Total		317	(17)
- * Club domestic league appearances and goals as of 3 May 2026

Faith Friday Obilor (born 5 March 1991) is a Nigerian professional footballer who plays as a defender for Malaysia Super League club Penang.

== Club Career ==
=== PS Kemi ===
In 2011, he came from Nigeria to join PS Kemi in Finnish 2nd league Ykkönen.

=== RoPS ===
He changed clubs after the first season as PS Kemi was relegated and continued to play in Ykkönen another year. Obilor joined RoPS and formed a defensive partnership with fellow Nigerian Nduka Alison, and RoPS secured a promotion to Veikkausliiga at the end of the 2012 season.

=== FC Inter ===
Obilar joined another Finnish club FC Inter on loan from RoPS. On 19 January 2016, Obilar back again joining FC Inter on a permanent transfer from RoPS.

=== HJK ===
On 29 November 2016, Obilor signed a two-year contract with HJK.

=== PDRM FC ===
In March 2024, Obilor moved to Southeast Asia for the first time, signing with Malaysia Super League side PDRM FC. He made 22 appearances during the 2024–25 season, establishing himself as one of the league's top-rated defenders.

=== Penang ===
On 27 August 2025, Obilor joined Penang on a free transfer. He made an immediate impact, scoring his first goal for the club in a 5–0 victory over Melaka FC in January 2026. He followed this with a match-winning header against Kuala Lumpur City F.C. on 14 January 2026.

== Honours ==
RoPS

- Ykkönen (1): 2012
- Finnish Cup (1): 2013

HJK

- Veikkausliiga: 2017, 2018
- Finnish Cup: 2017

Penang

- MFL Challenge Cup runner-up: 2026

Individual

- Veikkausliiga Defender of the Year: 2015, 2018
- Veikkausliiga Team of the Year: 2018

== Career statistics ==
As of 27 November 2024.

Appearances and goals by club, season and competition
Club	Season	League			National cup (Note: Includes Suomen Cup, Moldovan Cup, Kazakhstan Cup)		Continental		Other		Total	
Club	Season	Division	Apps	Goals	Apps	Goals	Apps	Goals	Apps	Goals	Apps	Goals
AmaZulu	2010–11	South African Premier Division	0	0	0	0	–		–		0	0
PS Kemi	2011	Ykkönen	21	0	–		–		–		21	0
RoPS	2012	Ykkönen	20	1	–		–		–		20	1
RoPS	2013	Veikkausliiga	31	1	5	1	–		6 (Note: Includes Finnish League Cup)	0	42	1
RoPS	2014	Veikkausliiga	31	1	2	0	2 (Note: Includes UEFA Europa League)	0	4	0	39	1
RoPS	2015	Veikkausliiga	30	2	1	0	–		7	1	38	3
RoPS	Total		112	5	8	1	2	0	17	1	139	7
Inter Turku (loan)	2012	Veikkausliiga	7	0	–		–		–		7	0
Inter Turku	2016	Veikkausliiga	33	0	3	0	–		5	0	41	0
HJK	2017	Veikkausliiga	24	2	8	0	3	0	–		35	2
HJK	2018	Veikkausliiga	29	1	8	1	6 (Note: Includes UEFA Champions League and UEFA Europa League)	0	–		43	2
HJK	2019	Veikkausliiga	23	0	5	0	5	0	–		33	0
HJK	Total		76	3	21	1	14	0	–	–	111	4
Sheriff Tiraspol	2020–21	Moldovan Super Liga	17	0	1	0	3	0	–		21	0
Taraz	2021	Kazakhstan Premier League	24	2	6	0	–		–		30	2
Aksu	2022	Kazakhstan Premier League	22	0	5	0	–		–		27	0
Aksu	2023	Kazakhstan Premier League	24	0	2	0	–		–		26	0
Aksu	Total		46	0	7	0	–	–	–	–	53	0
PDRM	2024–25	Malaysia Super League	13	0	0	0	–		–		13	0
Career total			349	10	46	2	19	0	22	1	436	13
