= Justus Lehto =

Finnish footballer (born 1997)

Personal information
- Date of birth: 6 April 1997 (age 29)
- Position: Midfielder

Team information
- Current team: Honka
- Number: 27

Youth career
- 2000–2015: FC Jazz

Senior career*
| Years | Team | Apps | (Gls) |
| 2016 | FC Jazz | 18 | (3) |
| 2016 | FC Jazz II | 6 | (3) |
| 2017–2018 | PS Kemi | 31 | (1) |
| 2021 | KPV | 18 | (2) |
| 2022 | KuPS II | 17 | (11) |
| 2023 | VPS | 1 | (0) |
| 2024–2026 | Jazz | 52 | (18) |
| 2026– | Honka | 16 | (6) |
- * Club domestic league appearances and goals as of 8 November 2026

Justus Lehto (born 6 April 1997) is a Finnish professional footballer who plays for Honka, as a midfielder.

== Career ==
Lehto began his career with FC Jazz, joining at three years of age.

In December 2020, Lehto revealed that he had suffered from severe overtraining syndrome and physical burnout, which kept him on sidelines for two-and-a-half years.

For the 2022 season, Lehto signed for Kuopion Palloseura, where he played for KuPS Academy team.

In 2023 Lehto returned to Veikkausliiga with VPS. In October 2023 VPS announced that Lehto was recovering from a heart operation, more precisely catheter ablation.

On 17 March 2024, Lehto returned to his boyhood club FC Jazz, following their promotion to the Ykkönen.
