= Rasmus Karjalainen =

Finnish footballer (born 1996)

Personal information
- Date of birth: 4 April 1996 (age 30)
- Place of birth: Oulu, Finland
- Height: 1.86 m (6 ft 1 in)
- Position: Winger

Team information
- Current team: AC Oulu
- Number: 7

Youth career
- –2013: OLS

Senior career*
Years	Team	Apps	(Gls)
2014	OLS	19	(1)
2015	SJK Akatemia	27	(15)
2016	AC Oulu	22	(3)
2017	PS Kemi	32	(8)
2018–2019	KuPS	43	(20)
2019–2021	Fortuna Sittard	15	(1)
2020	→ Örebro (loan)	13	(4)
2021–2022	Helsingborg	26	(4)
2022–2023	AC Oulu	41	(15)
2024–2025	SJK	56	(16)
2026–	AC Oulu	32	(13)

International career^{‡}
2016	Finland U19	1	(0)
2017–2018	Finland U21	9	(0)
2018–2020	Finland	13	(1)
Medal record
KuPS
Third place	Veikkausliiga	2018
First place	Veikkausliiga	2019
AC Oulu
Second place	Finnish League Cup	2023
- * Club domestic league appearances and goals as of 12 November 2026 ‡ National team caps and goals as of 20 December 2020

Rasmus Karjalainen (born 4 April 1996) is a Finnish professional footballer who plays as a winger or forward for and captains Veikkausliiga club AC Oulu. He began his senior career in 2014, at age 18, with OLS.

Karjalainen made his international debut for Finland in June 2018, and has since appeared in 2018–19 UEFA Nations League and in Finland's UEFA Euro 2020 campaign, in which Finland national team secured its first ever place in European Football Championship tournament's group stage.

== Club career ==
=== OLS ===
Karjalainen made his debut on senior level on 3 May 2014 in the ranks of OLS in a Kakkonen match against PS Kemi.

=== SJK Akatemia ===
For the next season he transferred to SJK's reserve team SJK Akatemia. During the season he gained 27 caps and 15 goals and was the second best goal scorer of the division.

=== Oulu ===
He spent season 2016 in his home town Oulu playing for AC Oulu.

=== PS Kemi ===
Karjalainen made his debut on the highest level of Finnish football, Veikkausliiga on season 2017 when he transferred to PS Kemi. He made his debut on 8 April, playing the first 70 minutes of a 0–0 draw against HIFK.

=== KuPS ===
For season 2018 he signed for KuPS.

=== Fortuna Sittard ===
In June 2019 he made a deal with Eredivisie side Fortuna Sittard, for an undisclosed fee.

In August 2020 he was loaned for a year to Allsvenskan side Örebro. In March 2021, Karjalainen suffered almost a career ending severe head injury in training with Örebro, and was forced to be ruled out for several months.

=== Helsingborg ===
On 17 July 2021, Karjalainen joined Superettan club Helsingborgs IF, signing a two-year deal.

=== Return to Oulu ===
On 23 June 2022, Karjalainen returned to AC Oulu for an undisclosed fee.

After the 2023 Veikkausliiga season, it was announced that Karjalainen will leave AC Oulu.

=== SJK ===
On 16 November 2023, it was confirmed by SJK that they had signed with Karjalainen on a two-year deal, starting in 2024. He played for the club's reserve team Kerho-07, currently SJK Akatemia, in 2015.

== International career ==
Karjalainen made his debut for the Finland national team on 5 June 2018 in a friendly match in Ilie Oană Stadium, Ploiești against Romania when he replaced Berat Sadik as a substitute on 63rd minute.

== Career statistics ==
As of 7 May 2026

Appearances and goals by club, season and competition
Club	Season	League			National cup (Note: Includes Suomen Cup, KNVB Beker and Svenska Cupen)		League cup		Continental		Total	
Club	Season	Division	Apps	Goals	Apps	Goals	Apps	Goals	Apps	Goals	Apps	Goals
OLS	2014	Kakkonen	19	1	0	0	—		—		19	1
SJK Akatemia	2015	Kakkonen	27	15	0	0	—		—		27	15
AC Oulu	2013	Ykkönen	0	0	1	0	–		–		1	0
AC Oulu	2014	Ykkönen	0	0	1	0	–		–		1	0
AC Oulu	2016	Ykkönen	22	3	0	0	—		—		22	3
AC Oulu	Total		22	3	2	0	0	0	0	0	24	3
PS Kemi	2017	Veikkausliiga	32	8	5	1	—		—		37	9
KuPS	2018	Veikkausliiga	31	17	6	2	—		2 (Note: Appearances in UEFA Europa League)	1	39	20
KuPS	2019	Veikkausliiga	12	3	5	1	—		0	0	17	4
KuPS	Total		43	20	11	3	0	0	2	1	56	24
Fortuna Sittard	2019–20	Eredivisie	15	1	2	1	—		—		17	2
Örebro (loan)	2020	Allsvenskan	13	4	2	1	—		—		15	5
Helsingborg	2021	Superettan	19	4	1	1	—		—		20	5
Helsingborg	2022	Allsvenskan	7	0	0	0	—		—		7	0
Helsingborg	Total		26	4	1	1	0	0	0	0	27	5
AC Oulu	2022	Veikkausliiga	14	7	0	0	0	0	—		14	7
AC Oulu	2023	Veikkausliiga	27	8	5	1	1	0	—		33	9
AC Oulu	Total		41	15	5	1	1	0	0	0	47	16
SJK	2024	Veikkausliiga	28	7	4	2	3	0	—		35	9
SJK	2025	Veikkausliiga	28	9	2	0	4	0	2 (Note: Appearances in UEFA Conference League)	0	36	9
SJK	Total		56	16	6	2	7	0	2	0	71	18
AC Oulu	2026	Veikkausliiga	6	5	0	0	7	5	–		13	10
Career total			300	92	32	8	15	5	4	1	351	108

=== International ===
As of match played on 11 November 2020.

National team	Year	Competitive		Friendly		Total	
National team	Year	Apps	Goals	Apps	Goals	Apps	Goals
Finland	2018	2	0	2	0	4	0
Finland	2019	3	0	2	1	5	1
Finland	2020	2	0	2	0	4	0
Total		7	0	6	1	13	1

=== International goals ===
Scores and results list Finland's goal tally first.

No.	Date	Venue	Opponent	Score	Result	Competition
1.	11 January 2019	Khalifa International Stadium, Doha, Qatar	Estonia	1–2	1–2	Friendly

== Honours ==
KuPS

- Veikkausliiga: 2019

AC Oulu

- Finnish League Cup runner-up: 2023, 2026

Individual

- Veikkausliiga Team of the Year: 2017
- Veikkausliiga Player of the Month: May 2018, April 2026
