= Marek Kaljumäe =

Estonian footballer

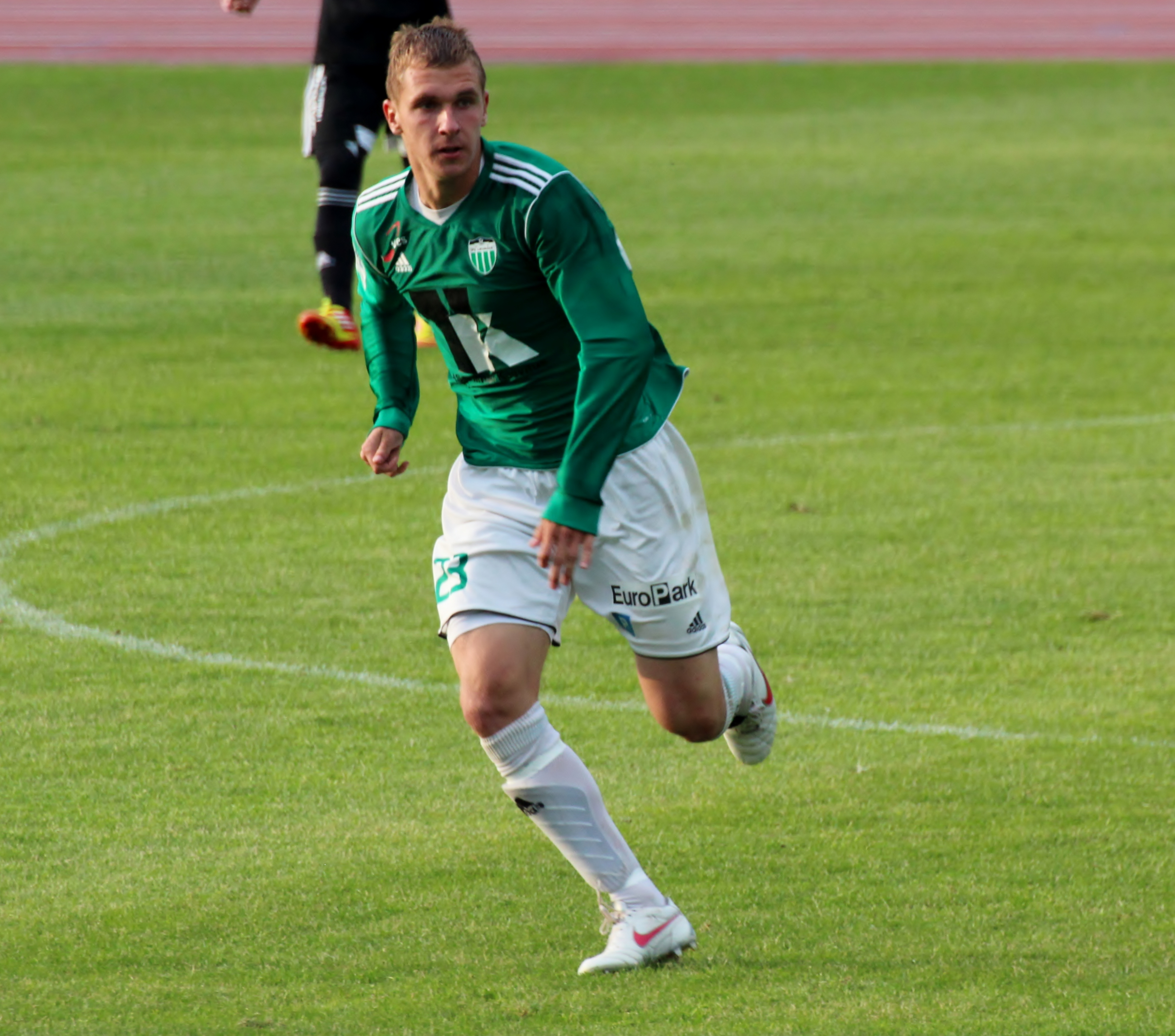
- Kaljumäe with Levadia in 2012

Personal information
- Full name: Marek Kaljumäe
- Date of birth: 18 February 1991 (age 35)
- Place of birth: Tallinn, Estonia
- Height: 1.85 m (6 ft 1 in)
- Positions: Defensive midfielder; defender

Youth career
- 2002–2009: SC Real
- 2008: Nõmme Kalju
- 2009–2010: AZ

Senior career*
Years	Team	Apps	(Gls)
2007	Kaitseliit Kalev II	6	(1)
2009–2011	AZ	0	(0)
2010–2011	→ Telstar (loan)	1	(0)
2011–2014	Levadia II	14	(2)
2011–2014	Levadia	81	(8)
2015	Narva Trans	35	(0)
2016	Levadia	36	(4)
2017–2018	PS Kemi	58	(2)
2019	Levadia	27	(1)
2020	Tallinna Kalev	29	(5)
2021	Vaprus	26	(0)
2022–2024	Tallinna Kalev	93	(4)

International career
2007	Estonia U17	3	(0)
2008	Estonia U18	3	(1)
2008–2009	Estonia U19	17	(0)
2010–2013	Estonia U21	17	(1)
2012–2014	Estonia U23	3	(0)
2017–2018	Estonia	5	(0)
- * Club domestic league appearances and goals as of 10 November 2024

Marek Kaljumäe (born 18 February 1991) is an Estonian former footballer, who played as a midfielder.

== Club career ==
=== Early career ===
Kaljumäe came through the SC Real youth system, where he was coached by Aivar Tiidus. In August 2009, he moved to the Netherlands, where he joined the AZ youth academy.

Kaljumäe joined Eerste Divisie club Telstar on loan for the 2010–11 season. He made a single appearance in the Eerste Divisie on 6 May 2011, in a 1–5 loss to Helmond Sport.

=== Levadia ===
On 1 July 2011, Kaljumäe signed a one-and-a-half-year contract with Levadia. He made his debut in the Meistriliiga on 9 July 2011, against Kuressaare. Kaljumäe won the Estonian Cup in 2012. He won his first Meistriliiga title in the 2013 season. On 8 January 2014, Kaljumäe signed a one-year contract extension with Levadia. He won his second Estonian Cup in 2014, and his second Meistriliiga title in the 2014 season.

=== Narva Trans ===
On 5 March 2015, Kaljumäe joined Meistriliiga club Narva Trans on a one-year deal.

=== Return to Levadia ===
On 29 February 2016, returned to Levadia on a one-year contract.

=== PS Kemi ===
On 18 January 2017, Kaljumäe signed one-year contract with Finnish Veikkausliiga club PS Kemi.

=== Return to Levadia again ===
Kaljumäe returned to Levadia for the third time. He signed a one-year contract on 27 December 2018, with an option to extend the contract for further one year.

== International career ==
Kaljumäe has represented Estonia at youth levels, playing for the under-17, under-18, under-19, under-21, and under-23 national sides.

Kaljumäe made his senior international debut for Estonia on 19 November 2017, in a 2–0 away victory over Fiji in a friendly.

== Honours ==
=== Club ===
Levadia

- Meistriliiga: 2013, 2014
- Estonian Cup: 2011–12, 2013–14
- Estonian Supercup: 2013
