= Sauvosaaren Urheilupuisto =

Football stadium in Finland

- Saukki
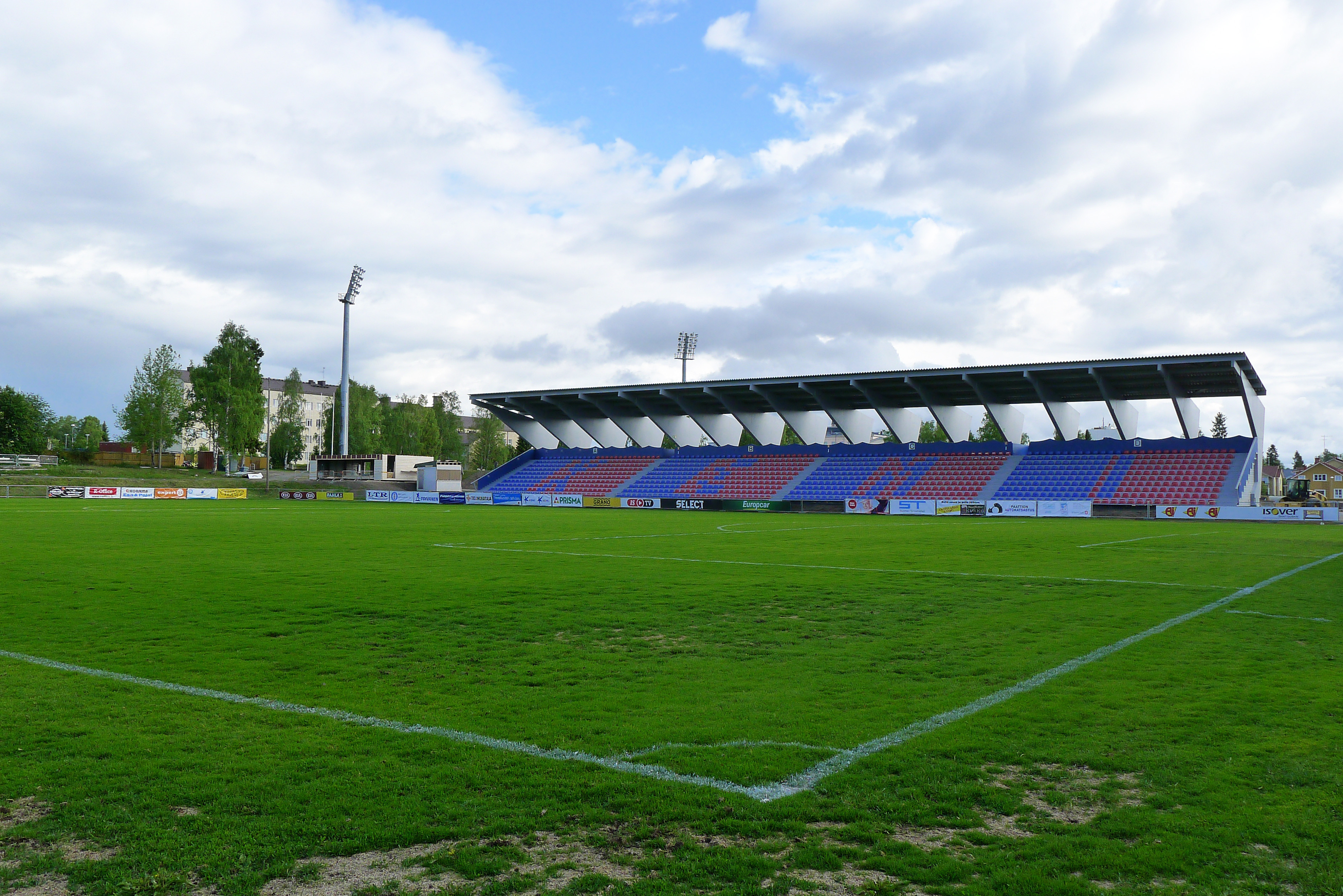
- Interactive map of Sauvosaaren Urheilupuisto
- Full name: Sauvosaaren Urheilupuisto
- Location: Urheilukatu 9, Kemi, Finland
- Coordinates: 65°43′47.2″N 24°33′38.1″E
- Capacity: 4,000
- Surface: Grass
- Field size: 102 x 68 m

Construction
- Built: 1934

Tenant
- Palloseura Kemi Kings

Sauvosaaren Urheilupuisto is a football stadium in Kemi, Finland. It is the current home of lower division club PS Kemi.
