= 2018 Veikkausliiga =

Veikkausliiga
- Season: 2018
- Champions: HJK; 29th title
- Relegated: TPS; PS Kemi
- Champions League: HJK
- Europa League: RoPS; KuPS; Inter Turku
- Matches: 198
- Goals: 490 (2.47 per match)
- Top goalscorer: Klauss (21)

The 2018 Veikkausliiga was the 88th season of top-tier football in Finland. HJK were the defending champions.

Fixtures for the 2018 season were announced on 17 January 2017. The season started on 7 April 2018 and ended on 27 October 2018.

== Teams ==
JJK were relegated to Ykkönen after finishing at the bottom of the 2017 season. Their place was taken by Ykkönen champions TPS.

HIFK as 11th-placed team lost their Veikkausliiga spot after losing to second-placed Ykkönen team FC Honka in a relegation/promotion playoff.

=== Stadia and locations ===
Location of teams in 2018 Veikkausliiga

Club	Location	Stadium	Turf	Capacity
FC Honka	Espoo	Tapiolan Urheilupuisto	Natural	6,000
FC Inter	Turku	Veritas Stadion	Natural	10,000
FC Lahti	Lahti	Lahden Stadion	Natural	15,000
HJK	Helsinki	Telia 5G -areena	Artificial	10,770
IFK Mariehamn	Mariehamn	Wiklöf Holding Arena	Natural	4,000
Ilves	Tampere	Tammelan Stadion	Natural	5,040
KuPS	Kuopio	Savon Sanomat Areena	Artificial	5,000
PS Kemi	Kemi	Sauvosaaren Urheilupuisto	Natural	4,500
RoPS	Rovaniemi	Rovaniemen keskuskenttä	Artificial	4,000
SJK	Seinäjoki	OmaSP Stadion	Artificial	6,000
TPS	Turku	Veritas Stadion	Natural	10,000
VPS	Vaasa	Elisa Stadion	Artificial	6,000

=== Personnel and kits ===
Club	Manager	Captain	Kit manufacturer	Sponsors
FC Honka	(Finland) Erik Jansson	(Finland) Tommi Saarinen	Puma	
FC Inter	(England) John Allen	(Finland) Timo Furuholm	Nike	Alfons Håkans
FC Lahti	(Finland) Toni Korkeakunnas	(Finland) Mikko Hauhia	Umbro	Halton; Lahti Energia; Prima Power
HJK	(Finland) Mika Lehkosuo	(Brazil) Rafinha	Adidas	Apu
IFK Mariehamn	(Finland) Peter Lundberg	(Finland) Kristian Kojola	Puma	Hotell Arkipelag
Ilves	(Finland) Pontus Augustinsson	(Finland) Mika Hilander	Adidas	LähiTapiola; Pihlajalinna; Kiilto
KuPS	(Finland) Jani Honkavaara	(Finland) Petteri Pennanen	Puma	LähiTapiola
PS Kemi		(Colombia) Julián Guevara	Craft	Various
RoPS	(Finland) Toni Koskela	(Finland) Antti Okkonen	Puma	
SJK	(Russia) Alexei Eremenko Sr.	(Estonia) Mihkel Aksalu	Adidas	LähiTapiola; Prima Power; Elisa
TPS	(Finland) Tuomas Pekkarinen	(Finland) Sami Rähmönen	Puma	OP Turun Seutu; Silja Line; LähiTapiola
VPS	(Finland) Petri Vuorinen	(Finland) Sebastian Strandvall	Puma	Various

=== Managerial changes ===
Team	Outgoing manager	Manner of departure	Date of vacancy	Incoming manager	Date of appointment	Table
RoPS	(Finland) Juha Malinen	Signed by Finland U19	31 October 2017	(Finland) Toni Koskela	1 November 2017	Pre-season
SJK	(Scotland) Brian Page (Finland) Toni Lehtinen	End of caretaker spell	31 October 2017	(Finland) Tommi Kautonen	1 November 2017	Pre-season
SJK	(Finland) Tommi Kautonen	Sacked	21 May 2018	(Russia) Alexei Eremenko Sr.	22 May 2018	9th
FC Inter	(Italy) Fabrizio Piccareta	Resigned	9 June 2018	(England) John Allen	10 June 2018	8th
PS Kemi	(Finland) Jari Åhman	Sacked	30 June 2018	(Scotland) David Hannah	1 July 2018	12th

== League table ==
Pos	Team	Pld	W	D	L	GF	GA	GD	Pts	Qualification or relegation
1	HJK (C)	33	24	6	3	61	19	+42	78	Qualification for the Champions League first qualifying round (Note: HJK qualified for the Champions League first qualifying round)
2	RoPS	33	18	8	7	42	25	+17	62	Qualification for the Europa League first qualifying round
3	KuPS	33	17	7	9	56	37	+19	58	Qualification for the Europa League first qualifying round
4	Honka	33	15	13	5	51	33	+18	58	
5	Ilves	33	14	7	12	45	41	+4	49	
6	VPS	33	10	11	12	37	43	−6	41	
7	Inter Turku	33	10	10	13	37	44	−7	40	Qualification for the Europa League first qualifying round (Note: Inter Turku qualified for the Europa League first qualifying round by winning the 2017-18 Finnish Cup)
8	Lahti	33	9	13	11	30	38	−8	40	
9	SJK	33	8	8	17	28	37	−9	32	
10	IFK Mariehamn	33	8	7	18	37	59	−22	31	
11	TPS (R)	33	7	8	18	37	55	−18	29	Qualification for the relegation play-offs
12	PS Kemi Kings (R)	33	6	6	21	29	59	−30	24	Relegation to the Ykkönen

Source: Veikkausliiga (in Finnish), Soccerway
Rules for classification: 1) Points; 2) Goal difference; 3) Goals scored; 4) Head-to-head points; 5) Head-to-head goal difference; 6) Head-to-head away goals scored; 7) Play-off
(Note: Play-off is only played if need to decide champion, teams for relegation or UEFA competition and will be played on a neutral ground).
(C) Champions; (R) Relegated

== Results ==
Each team plays three times against every other team, either twice at home and once away or once at home and twice away, for a total of 33 matches played each.

=== Matches 1–22 ===
Home \ Away	HJK	HON	ILV	INT	KPS	LAH	MAR	PSK	RPS	SJK	TPS	VPS
HJK	—	3–2	3–1	3–0	1–2	1–2	2–0	2–0	2–2	4–0	2–1	5–0
Honka	1–2	—	4–1	2–2	2–1	0–0	1–1	2–1	2–2	3–1	2–0	0–1
Ilves	0–0	3–3	—	1–1	2–1	0–0	1–2	2–0	1–0	1–1	2–0	0–0
Inter	0–0	2–3	0–1	—	0–1	2–0	3–0	1–0	3–3	2–0	1–2	1–3
KuPS	2–2	1–1	3–1	5–1	—	1–1	2–1	2–3	0–1	1–1	3–2	1–2
Lahti	2–1	1–1	2–0	1–2	1–0	—	2–0	1–1	0–0	1–0	3–2	1–1
IFK Mariehamn	0–1	1–2	2–0	2–3	1–4	1–2	—	2–1	1–3	1–0	3–2	2–2
PS Kemi Kings	1–2	1–1	0–2	2–4	3–2	0–0	2–3	—	0–1	1–0	2–2	0–1
RoPs	1–2	1–2	2–0	0–1	2–0	2–0	2–0	3–0	—	1–0	0–0	1–0
SJK	0–1	2–0	2–3	0–1	1–3	1–0	1–1	0–1	2–1	—	4–0	0–0
TPS	0–1	0–0	1–3	1–1	0–0	1–1	2–0	3–2	0–0	0–2	—	0–1
VPS	1–2	1–1	1–1	2–0	0–2	2–2	4–1	3–1	0–1	1–1	2–0	—

Source: Veikkausliiga (in Finnish)
Legend: Blue = home team win; Yellow = draw; Red = away team win.

=== Matches 23–33 ===
Home \ Away	HJK	HON	ILV	INT	KPS	LAH	MAR	PSK	RPS	SJK	TPS	VPS
HJK	—	–	–	3–0	–	–	2–0	0–0	3–0	1–0	–	1–0
Honka	0–0	—	–	–	–	2–0	–	2–1	–	–	3–0	3–1
Ilves	1–2	0–1	—	1–0	–	0–1	–	4–0	–	–	2–0	–
Inter	–	0–2	–	—	0–1	–	1–1	–	0–0	–	–	1–1
KuPS	0–1	1–1	2–0	–	—	2–1	–	3–1	–	–	2–1	–
Lahti	0–2	–	–	0–0	–	—	–	1–2	1–2	–	2–5	1–1
IFK Mariehamn	–	0–0	3–6	–	1–2	3–0	—	–	–	1–0	2–2	–
PS Kemi Kings	–	–	–	0–2	–	–	2–0	—	0–2	0–0	–	0–2
RoPs	–	2–1	1–0	–	1–1	–	1–0	–	—	0–1	–	–
SJK	–	0–1	2–3	2–2	1–2	0–0	–	–	–	—	1–0	–
TPS	0–4	–	–	1–0	–	–	–	4–1	1–2	–	—	4–1
VPS	–	–	1–2	–	0–3	–	1–1	–	1–2	0–2	–	—

Source: Veikkausliiga (in Finnish)
Legend: Blue = home team win; Yellow = draw; Red = away team win.

== Season statistics ==
=== Top scorers ===
As of match played 27 October 2018

Rank	Player	Club	Goals
1	(Brazil) Klauss	HJK	21
2	(Finland) Rasmus Karjalainen	KuPS	17
3	(The Gambia) Macoumba Kandji	Honka	16
4	(Spain) Borjas Martín	Honka	12
4	(Finland) Petteri Pennanen	KuPS	12
6	(Finland) Aleksei Kangaskolkka	IFK Mariehamn	10
6	(Finland) Sebastian Strandvall	VPS	10
8	(Finland) Timo Furuholm	Inter Turku	9
8	(Cameroon) Marius Noubissi	Ilves	9
10	(Finland) Mika Ääritalo	TPS	8
10	(Finland) Benjamin Källman	Inter Turku	8
10	(Finland) Lassi Lappalainen	RoPS	8

== Awards ==
=== Annual awards ===
Award	Winner	Club
Player of the Year	(Brazil) Klauss	HJK
Goalkeeper of the Year	(Spain) Antonio Reguero	RoPS
Defender of the Year	(Nigeria) Faith Obilor	HJK
Midfielder of the Year	(Finland) Petteri Pennanen	KuPS
Striker of the Year	(Brazil) Klauss	HJK
Breakthrough of the Year	(Brazil) Klauss	HJK
Coach of the Year	(Finland) Toni Koskela	RoPS

=== Team of the Year ===

Team of the Year
Goalkeeper	(Spain) Antonio Reguero (RoPs)			
Defence	(Finland) Henri Aalto (Honka)	(Nigeria) Faith Obilor (HJK)	(Finland) Leo Väisänen (RoPs)	(Nigeria) Taye Taiwo (RoPs)
Midfield	(Finland) Sebastian Strandvall (VPS)	(Finland) Sebastian Dahlström (HJK)	(Spain) Borjas Martin (Honka)	(Finland) Petteri Pennanen (KuPs)
Attack	(Brazil) Klauss (HJK)		(Senegal) Macoumba Kandji (Honka)	

== Attendances ==
No.	Club	Average	Highest
1	HJK	3,779	5,723
2	TPS	3,004	5,560
3	Ilves	2,860	4,762
4	RoPS	2,625	4,013
5	KuPS	2,618	3,695
6	SJK	2,534	4,010
7	VPS	2,070	3,928
8	Inter Turku	1,954	5,525
9	Honka	1,928	3,302
10	Lahti	1,820	2,830
11	Mariehamn	1,236	1,795
12	Kemi	1,209	3,650
