= Kemin Palloseura =

Finnish football club

- Founded: 1932; 94 years ago
- Ground: Sauvosaaren Urheilupuisto
- Capacity: 4,000
- Chairman: Pekka Tuomela
- Manager: Joonas Ikäläinen
- League: Kolmonen
- 2022: Kolmonen, 2nd
- Website: https://www.keps.fi/
Home colours	Away colours

Kemin Palloseura (or KePS) is a Finnish football team based in the town of Kemi, that competes in the Kolmonen. The club have spent three seasons in the top flight in their history.

== History ==
The club was established on October 21, 1999. Kemi Kings was created out of a merger between Kemin Palloseura (KePS), Kemin Pallotoverit-85 (KPT-85) and Visan Pallo. All three teams continue only as junior teams–having younger than B-juniors–while PS Kemi took over A and B juniors. The best achievement of PS Kemi Kings so far has been reaching eighth place in the Finnish Cup competition 2006. The team also played in Finnish Cup's small final, but lost it to Kultsu FC after the penalty shootout. In the 2007 season PS Kemi Kings won the Kakkonen's C-sector and were promoted to the second division, the Ykkönen. In the 2008 season PS Kemi Kings successfully fought against the relegation and also Qualified for the Top-16 in the Finnish Cup. In January 2011 the sport director Jukka Kuusisto signed a contract with finish TopSpot – Sports, Development and Technology – Sports Management with Social Responsibility and signed later his first two Nigerian players for his club the forward Patrick Chibuzor Onyeaghala from Nigerian Football Academy and the defender Faith Friday Obilor from FC Odiaba. PS Kemi won two successive promotions to the first division in 2014, the Ykkönen, and then, for the first time in their history, to the premier division, the Veikkausliiga in 2015.

The club ran into financial difficulties in the Veikkausliiga and the club's parent company ceased operations due to financial problems in February 2019. PS Kemi formed a new club, Kemi City FC, in early 2019 and continued its sports activities at the Palloseura Kemi Kings Association's Serie 3 in Northern Finland. In March, it was announced that English-based Redstrike Group had acquired a 40% holding in Kemi City FC. Kemi City FC ended the 19/20 Season champions of Finnish Football Division ‘Kolmonen' and gained automatic promotion to the Kakkonen for season 2020/21.

In February 2022, the club were taken over by a group led by Mark Ellis and reverted back to their original PS Kemi name. Ellis, who was Academy Director of RIASA at the time, stated that the acquisition would provide a pathway into senior football for graduates of the school's programs.

== Season to season ==
Season	Level	Division	Section	Administration	Position	Movements
2001	Tier 3	Kakkonen (Second Division)	North Group	Finnish FA (Suomen Pallolitto)	6th	
2002	Tier 3	Kakkonen (Second Division)	North Group	Finnish FA (Suomen Pallolitto)	4th	
2003	Tier 3	Kakkonen (Second Division)	North Group	Finnish FA (Suomen Palloliitto)	1st	Play-Offs
2004	Tier 3	Kakkonen (Second Division)	North Group	Finnish FA (Suomen Palloliitto)	4th	
2005	Tier 3	Kakkonen (Second Division)	North Group	Finnish FA (Suomen Palloliitto)	3rd	
2006	Tier 3	Kakkonen (Second Division)	Group C	Finnish FA (Suomen Palloliitto)	2nd	
2007	Tier 3	Kakkonen (Second Division)	Group C	Finnish FA (Suomen Palloliitto)	1st	Promoted
2008	Tier 2	Ykkönen (First Division)		Finnish FA (Suomen Palloliitto)	8th	
2009	Tier 2	Ykkönen (First Division)		Finnish FA (Suomen Palloliitto)	7th	
2010	Tier 2	Ykkönen (First Division)		Finnish FA (Suomen Palloliitto)	9th	
2011	Tier 2	Ykkönen (First Division)		Finnish FA (Suomen Palloliitto)	10th	Relegated
2012	Tier 3	Kakkonen (Second Division)	Northern Group	Finnish FA (Suomen Palloliitto)	3rd	
2013	Tier 3	Kakkonen (Second Division)	Northern Group	Finnish FA (Suomen Palloliitto)	1st	Play-offs
2014	Tier 3	Kakkonen (Second Division)	Northern Group	Finnish FA (Suomen Palloliitto)	1st	Play-offs, promoted
2015	Tier 2	Ykkönen (First Division)		Finnish FA (Suomen Palloliitto)	1st	Promoted
2016	Tier 1	Veikkausliiga (Division One)		Finnish FA (Suomen Palloliitto)	9th	
2017	Tier 1	Veikkausliiga (Division One)		Finnish FA (Suomen Palloliitto)	10th	
2018	Tier 1	Veikkausliiga (Division One)		Finnish FA (Suomen Palloliitto)	12th	Relegation
2019	Tier 4	Kolmonen	Pohjois-Suomen	Finnish FA (Suomen Palloliitto)	1st	Promotion
2020	Tier 3	Kakkonen (Second Division)	Group C	Finnish FA (Suomen Palloliitto)	8th	
2021	Tier 3	Kakkonen (Second Division)	Group C	Finnish FA (Suomen Palloliitto)	12th	Relegation
2022	Tier 4	Kolmonen	Pohjoinen	Finnish FA (Suomen Palloliitto)	2nd	
2023	Tier 4	Kolmonen	Pohjoinen	Finnish FA (Suomen Palloliitto)		

- 3 seasons in Veikkausliiga
- 5 seasons in Ykkönen
- 12 seasons in Kakkonen
- 1 season in Kolmonen

== Notable players ==
This list of former players includes those who received international caps, made significant contributions to the team in terms of appearances or goals, or who made significant contributions to the sport. It is not complete or all inclusive, and additions and refinements will continue to be made over time.

- (Bermuda) Jonté Smith
- (Canada) Tyler Pasher
- (Cape Verde) Alvin Fortes
- (Estonia) Marek Kaljumäe
- (Estonia) Sergei Mošnikov
- (Finland) Keijo Huusko
- (Finland) Rasmus Karjalainen
- (Finland) Tuomo Könönen
- (Finland) Juho Mäkelä
- (Finland) Kalle Taimi
- (French Guiana) Marvin Torvic
- (The Gambia) Momoudou Ceesay
- (The Gambia) Abdoulie Mansally
- (Guinea-Bissau) Aliu Djaló
- (Saint Vincent and the Grenadines) Cornelius Stewart
- (Somalia) Abdulkadir Said Ahmed
- (Somalia) Omar Jama
- (Trinidad and Tobago) Aubrey David
- (Trinidad and Tobago) Rundell Winchester
