= 2013 HJK season =

HJK
2013 season
- Chairman: Olli-Pekka Lyytikäinen
- Manager: Sixten Boström
- Stadium: Sonera Stadium
- Veikkausliiga: Champions
- Finnish Cup: Sixth round vs RoPS
- League Cup: Quarter-final vs JJK
- UEFA Champions League: Second qualifying round vs Nõmme Kalju
- Top goalscorer: League: Mikael Forssell (14); All: Mikael Forssell (17)
| Home colours | Away colours |

The 2013 season was Helsingin Jalkapalloklubi's 105th competitive season. HJK is the most successful Finnish football club with 25 Finnish Championships, 11 Finnish Cup titles, 4 Finnish League Cup titles and one appearance in the UEFA Champions League Group Stages.

== Squad ==
As of match played 26 October 2013

| No. | Name | Nationality | Position | Date of birth (age) | Signed from | Signed in | Contract ends | Apps. | Goals |
Goalkeepers
| 1 | Ville Wallén | (Finland) | GK | 20 June 1976 (aged 37) | Jokerit | 2003 | | | |
| 13 | Carljohan Eriksson | (Finland) | GK | 25 April 1995 (aged 18) | Youth Team | 2012 | | 0 | 0 |
| 35 | Saku-Pekka Sahlgren | (Finland) | GK | 8 April 1992 (aged 21) | KPV | 2011 | | | |
Defenders
| 2 | Tuomas Kansikas | (Finland) | DF | 15 May 1981 (aged 32) | MyPa | 2008 | | | |
| 3 | Valtteri Moren | (Finland) | DF | 15 June 1991 (aged 22) | Youth Team | 2010 | | | |
| 5 | Tapio Heikkilä | (Finland) | DF | 8 April 1990 (aged 23) | Honka | 2013 | | 37 | 1 |
| 6 | Timi Lahti | (Finland) | DF | 28 June 1990 (aged 23) | Haka | 2011 | | | |
| 11 | Mathias Lindström | (Finland) | DF | 14 January 1981 (aged 32) | Tampere United | 2009 | | | |
| 17 | Nikolai Alho | (Finland) | DF | 12 March 1993 (aged 20) | Youth Team | 2012 | | 49 | 6 |
| 21 | Mikko Sumusalo | (Finland) | DF | 12 March 1990 (aged 23) | Youth Team | 2009 | | | |
| 25 | Pauli Loukola | (Finland) | DF | 26 April 1994 (aged 19) | Youth Team | 2014 | | 1 | 0 |
| 32 | Felipe Aspegren | (Finland) | DF | 12 February 1994 (aged 19) | Youth Team | 2012 | | 3 | 0 |
| | Mikko Viitikko | (Finland) | DF | 18 April 1995 (aged 18) | Youth Team | 2012 | | 0 | 0 |
Midfielders
| 4 | Mika Väyrynen | (Finland) | MF | 28 December 1981 (aged 31) | Leeds United | 2012 | | 22 | 4 |
| 7 | Sebastian Mannström | (Finland) | MF | 29 October 1988 (aged 24) | FF Jaro | 2011 | 2014 | | |
| 10 | Teemu Tainio | (Finland) | MF | 27 November 1979 (aged 33) | New York Red Bulls | 2013 | | 26 | 2 |
| 22 | Joel Perovuo | (Finland) | MF | 11 August 1985 (aged 28) | Djurgården | 2011 | | | |
| 25 | Sakari Mattila | (Finland) | MF | 14 July 1989 (aged 24) | loan from Bellinzona | 2012 | 2013 | | |
| 27 | Sebastian Sorsa | (Finland) | MF | 25 January 1984 (aged 29) | Hamilton Academical | 2009 | 2014 | | |
| 28 | Rasmus Schüller | (Finland) | MF | 18 June 1991 (aged 22) | Honka | 2012 | 2014 | 71 | 11 |
| 58 | Fredrik Lassas | (Finland) | MF | 1 October 1996 (aged 17) | Youth Team | 2013 | | 1 | 0 |
Forwards
| 8 | Erfan Zeneli | (Finland) | FW | 28 December 1986 (aged 26) | Youth Team | 2005 | | | |
| 9 | Mikael Forssell | (Finland) | FW | 15 March 1981 (aged 32) | Leeds United | 2013 | | | |
| 14 | Eero Markkanen | (Finland) | FW | 3 July 1991 (aged 22) | loan from JJK | 2013 | 2013 | 6 | 1 |
| 26 | Demba Savage | (The Gambia) | FW | 17 June 1988 (aged 25) | Honka | 2012 | | 78 | 28 |
| 31 | Robin Lod | (Finland) | FW | 17 April 1993 (aged 20) | Youth Team | 2011 | | | |
Out on loan
| 15 | Akseli Pelvas | (Finland) | FW | 8 February 1989 (aged 24) | Youth Team | 2007 | | | |
| 20 | Joel Pohjanpalo | (Finland) | FW | 13 September 1994 (aged 19) | Youth Team | 2011 | | | |
| 29 | Emerik Grönroos | (Finland) | MF | 6 July 1994 (aged 19) | Youth Team | 2012 | | 2 | 0 |
Left during the season
| 5 | Radoš Bulatović | (Serbia) | FW | 5 June 1984 (aged 29) | Hajduk Kula | 2013 | 2013 | 1 | 0 |
| 36 | Kristian Nicht | (Germany) | GK | 3 April 1982 (aged 31) | Rochester Rhinos | 2013 | 2013 | 1 | 0 |
| | Alexander Ring | (Finland) | MF | 9 April 1991 (aged 22) | Youth Team | 2010 | | | |

=== Out on loan ===
Note: Flags indicate national team as defined under FIFA eligibility rules; some limited exceptions apply. Players may hold more than one non-FIFA nationality.

| No. / Pos. / Nation / Player; 15 / FW / FIN / Akseli Pelvas (on loan at SJK) | No. / Pos. / Nation / Player; 20 / FW / FIN / Joel Pohjanpalo (on loan at Leverkusen) |

== Transfers ==
=== In ===
| Date | Position | Nationality | Name | From | Fee | Ref. |
|---|---|---|---|---|---|---|
| 30 October 2012† | FW | (Finland) | Mikael Forssell | Leeds United | Free | |
| 9 January 2013 | FW | (Finland) | Teemu Tainio | New York Red Bulls | Free | |

† Transfer announced on the above date, being finalised on 1 January 2013.

=== Out ===
| Date | Position | Nationality | Name | From | Fee | Ref. |
|---|---|---|---|---|---|---|
| 7 January 2013 | DF | (Finland) | Rami Hakanpää | KuPS | Undisclosed | |
| 8 January 2013 | MF | (Finland) | Antti Okkonen | RoPS | Undisclosed | |
| 25 January 2013 | FW | (Finland) | Berat Sadik | Thun | Undisclosed | |
| 30 January 2013 | FW | (Finland) | Juho Mäkelä | Sandhausen | Undisclosed | |
| 26 February 2013 | FW | (Egypt) | Sherif Ashraf | Haras El Hodoud | Undisclosed | |
| 19 June 2013 | MF | (Finland) | Alexander Ring | 1. FC Kaiserslautern | Undisclosed | |

=== Loans in ===
| Start date | Position | Nationality | Name | From | End date | Ref. |
|---|---|---|---|---|---|---|
| 1 September 2013 | FW | (Finland) | Eero Markkanen | JJK | End of 2013 season | |

=== Loans out ===
| Start date | Position | Nationality | Name | To | End date | Ref. |
|---|---|---|---|---|---|---|
| 15 July 2013 | FW | (Finland) | Akseli Pelvas | SJK | End of Season | |
| 3 September 2013 | FW | (Finland) | Joel Pohjanpalo | Bayer Leverkusen | End of Season | |

=== Trial ===
| Date From | Position | Nationality | Name | Last club | Date To | Ref. |
|---|---|---|---|---|---|---|
| January 2013 | DF | (Serbia) | Radoš Bulatović | Hajduk Kula | | |
| February 2013 | GK | (Germany) | Kristian Nicht | Rochester Rhinos | | |

== Competitions ==
=== Veikkausliiga ===
==== Results summary ====
| Overall | | | | | | | | Home | | | | | | Away | | | | | |
| Pld | W | D | L | GF | GA | GD | Pts | W | D | L | GF | GA | GD | W | D | L | GF | GA | GD |
|---|---|---|---|---|---|---|---|---|---|---|---|---|---|---|---|---|---|---|---|
| 33 | 22 | 7 | 4 | 78 | 25 | +53 | 73 | 12 | 2 | 3 | 41 | 14 | +27 | 10 | 5 | 1 | 37 | 11 | +26 |

Last updated: 24 October 2015.
Source: Soccerway

==== Results ====
| 22 April 2013 1 | FC Honka | 0 – 2 | HJK | Espoo |
| 18:30 EEST (UTC+3) | Baah (yellow card) 5'; Rexhepi (yellow card) 53' | Report | Forssell 8'; Schüller 82' | Stadium: Tapiolan Urheilupuisto; Attendance: 3,492; Referee: Jari Järvinen |

| 29 April 2013 2 | HJK | 2 – 0 | MYPA | Helsinki |
| 18:30 EEST (UTC+3) | Moren (yellow card) 39'; Zeneli 45+1'; Savage 83' | Report | Gela (yellow card) 37'; J. Pyhäranta (yellow card) 87'; Williams (yellow card) 90+1' | Stadium: Sonera Stadium; Attendance: 5,040; Referee: Dennis Antamo |

| 2 May 2013 3 | FC Inter | 2 – 2 | HJK | Turku |
| 18:30 EEST (UTC+3) | Kauppi (yellow card) 38'; Diallo (yellow card) 51' (goal) 63'; Lehtonen 70' (yellow card) 82'; S. Paajanen (yellow card) 90' | Report | Zeneli 6'; Sorsa (yellow card) 32'; Pohjanpalo 43'; Mannström (yellow card) 57'; Schüller (yellow card) 61' | Stadium: Veritas Stadion; Attendance: 2,050; Referee: Mattias Gestranius |

| 5 May 2013 4 | FF Jaro | 2 – 3 | HJK | Jakobstad |
| 18:30 EEST (UTC+3) | Helmke 41' (yellow card) 45+1'; Jonke (yellow card) 64'; Kullström 88' | Report | Sorsa (yellow card) 23'; Savage 33', 73' (yellow card) 66'; Zeneli 47' (yellow card) 85'; Moren (yellow card) 67' | Stadium: Jakobstads Centralplan; Attendance: 1,764; Referee: Ville Nevalainen |

| 9 May 2013 5 | HJK | 0 – 0 | IFK Mariehamn | Helsinki |
| 14:00 EEST (UTC+3) | Heikkilä (yellow card) 41' | Report | Wiklöf (yellow card) 77' | Stadium: Sonera Stadium; Attendance: 7,128; Referee: Petteri Kari |

| 13 May 2013 6 | FC Lahti | 0 – 1 | HJK | Lahti |
| 18:30 EEST (UTC+3) | L. Hertsi (yellow card) 42'; Kari (yellow card) 69' | Report | Forssell 79' | Stadium: Kisapuisto; Attendance: 3,879; Referee: Jari Järvinen |

| 17 May 2013 7 | HJK | 0 – 2 | TPS | Helsinki |
| 18:30 EEST (UTC+3) | Tainio (red card); Zeneli (yellow card) 60' | Report | J. Tursas (yellow card) 16'; Lähde (yellow card) 47'; Ristola (yellow card) 60' (goal) 83'; Riski 90+2' | Stadium: Sonera Stadium; Attendance: 6,111; Referee: Tero Nieminen |

| 23 May 2013 8 | HJK | 1 – 2 | VPS | Helsinki |
| 18:30 EEST (UTC+3) | Pohjanpalo 9' | Report | Ameobi 52'; Strandvall 72' | Stadium: Sonera Stadium; Attendance: 3,663; Referee: Petteri Kari |

| 26 May 2013 9 | HJK | 2 – 0 | RoPS | Helsinki |
| 18:30 EEST (UTC+3) | Savage 23'; Lod 53'; Mannström (yellow card) 70' | Report | Guerra (yellow card) 75' | Stadium: Sonera Stadium; Attendance: 3,574; Referee: Dennis Antamo |

| 29 May 2013 10 | JJK | 1 – 3 | HJK | Jyväskylä |
| 18:30 EEST (UTC+3) | van Gelderen (yellow card) 5'; Wusu (yellow card) 25' (goal) 31'; Poutiainen (yellow card) 45' | Report | Lod (yellow card) 20'; Savage 21'; Lindström (yellow card) 73'; Sumusalo 77'; Forssell 83' | Stadium: Harjun stadion Attendance: 3,590; Referee: Mattias Gestranius |

| 1 June 2013 11 | HJK | 1 – 2 | KuPS | Helsinki |
| 16:00 EEST (UTC+3) | Sumusalo (yellow card) 67'; Forssell 70' | Report | Ilo 42'; Bah (yellow card) 44' (goal) 81'; Hynynen (yellow card) 57' | Stadium: Sonera Stadium; Attendance: 3,257; Referee: Jari Järvinen |

| 13 June 2013 12 | HJK | 6 – 0 | FC Inter | Helsinki |
| 18:30 EEST (UTC+3) | Mattila 17'; Heikkilä 22'; Zeneli 26'; Forssell 31' (pen.); Alho 64', 89' | Report | Bouwman (yellow card) 28'; Gnabouyou (yellow card) 30'; Diallo (yellow card) 33'; Nyman (yellow card) 73'; Aspegren (yellow card) 76' | Stadium: Sonera Stadium; Attendance: 3,185; Referee: Dennis Antamo |

| 16 June 2013 13 | FC Honka | 1 – 0 | HJK | Espoo |
| 18:30 EEST (UTC+3) | Sorsa 23' (o.g.); Yaghoubi (yellow card) 39'; Mäkijärvi (yellow card) 58'; Palazuelos (yellow card) 78' | Report | Heikkilä (yellow card) 56'; Sumusalo (yellow card) 75' | Stadium: Tapiolan Urheilupuisto; Attendance: 4,175; Referee: Tero Nieminen |

| 19 June 2013 14 | MYPA | 2 – 4 | HJK | Kouvola |
| 18:30 EEST (UTC+3) | Gela 18'; Ramadingaye (yellow card) 38'; Anttilainen (yellow card) 47'; Aho (yellow card) 85'; Salmikivi 88' | Report | Tainio 5'; Savage 48'; Moren 66'; Zeneli 73' | Stadium: Kymenlaakson Sähkö Stadion; Attendance: 2,323; Referee: Ville Nevalainen |

| 24 June 2013 15 | HJK | 0 – 0 | FF Jaro | Helsinki |
| 18:30 EEST (UTC+3) | Mattila (yellow card) 9'; Moren (yellow card) 45'; Schüller (yellow card) 51' | Report | Jovanović (yellow card) 13'; M. Wargh (yellow card) 84' | Stadium: Sonera Stadium; Attendance: 3,907; Referee: Juha Matti Kanniainen |

| 27 June 2013 16 | IFK Mariehamn | 0 – 5 | HJK | Mariehamn |
| 18:45 EEST (UTC+3) | Kukka (yellow card) 19'; Assis (yellow card) 44' | Report | Pohjanpalo 16', 84', 88'; Moren 20'; Zeneli (yellow card) 37'; Heikkilä (yellow card) 41'; Schüller 66' | Stadium: Wiklöf Holding Arena; Attendance: 1,627; Referee: Dennis Antamo |

| 1 July 2013 17 | HJK | 2 – 1 | FC Lahti | Helsinki |
| 18:30 EEST (UTC+3) | Perovuo 22' (pen.); Savage 59' | Report | Mäkitalo (yellow card) 20'; Aho (yellow card) 55'; Rafael 75' | Stadium: Sonera Stadium; Attendance: 4,903; Referee: Vesa Hätilä |

| 12 July 2013 18 | HJK | 3 – 0 | VPS | Helsinki |
| 18:30 EEST (UTC+3) | Mattila 45'; Schüller 53'; Forssell 90+1' | Report | | Stadium: Sonera Stadium; Attendance: 6,804; Referee: Miikka Lähdesmäki |

| 20 July 2013 19 | RoPS | 0 – 0 | HJK | Rovaniemi |
| 15:05 EEST (UTC+3) | Okkonen (yellow card) 67'; Könönen (yellow card) 68'; Lahtinen (yellow card) 77' | Report | Zeneli (yellow card) 67'; Forssell (yellow card) 67' | Stadium: Rovaniemen keskuskenttä Attendance: 2,469; Referee: Ville Nevalainen |

| 27 July 2013 20 | HJK | 2 – 0 | JJK | Helsinki |
| 16:00 EEST (UTC+3) | Savage 80'; Perovuo 90+2' | Report | Latikka (yellow card) 20'; Wusu (yellow card) 42' | Stadium: Sonera Stadium; Attendance: 3,942; Referee: Mattias Gestranius |

| 4 August 2013 21 | KuPS | 0 – 0 | HJK | Kuopio |
| 16:00 EEST (UTC+3) | Hakanpää (yellow card) 66' | Report | Sorsa (yellow card) 49'; Savage (yellow card) 63' | Stadium: Savon Sanomat Areena; Attendance: 4,379; Referee: Dennis Antamo |

| 11 August 2013 22 | FC Inter | 1 – 1 | HJK | Turku |
| 18:30 EEST (UTC+3) | J. Hämäläinen 90' | Report | Lindström (yellow card) 71'; Schüller (yellow card) 71'; Savage 89' | Stadium: Veritas Stadion; Attendance: 2,013; Referee: Petteri Kari |

| 18 August 2013 23 | HJK | 4 – 2 | FC Honka | Helsinki |
| 18:30 EEST (UTC+3) | Lod 4', 79', 81'; Mattila (yellow card) 7'; Heikkilä (yellow card) 14'; Sumusalo (yellow card) 25'; Tainio 66' | Report | Heimonen (yellow card) 11'; Väyrynen 51'; Baah 59' | Stadium: Sonera Stadium; Attendance: 10,305; Referee: Mattias Gestranius |

| 25 August 2013 24 | HJK | 2 – 1 | MYPA | Helsinki |
| 18:30 EEST (UTC+3) | Savage (yellow card) 19'; Mattila 42' (pen.) (yellow card) 75'; Kansikas (yellow card) 64'; Schüller 76' | Report | Anttilainen 61' (yellow card) 77'; Sesay (yellow card) 72'; P. Soiri (yellow card) 86' | Stadium: Sonera Stadium; Attendance: 5,220; Referee: Jari Järvinen |

| 1 September 2013 25 | Jaro | 1 – 5 | HJK | Jakobstad |
| 18:30 EEST (UTC+3) | Banner (yellow card) 34'; I. Elmi (yellow card) 74'; Funicello (red card) 53'; Moren 80' (o.g.) | Report | Forssell 4', 76'; Zeneli 44'; Alho 47'; Mattila 58' | Stadium: Jakobstads Centralplan; Attendance: 2,048; Referee: Ville Nevalainen |

| 13 September 2013 26 | HJK | 6 – 1 | IFK Mariehamn | Helsinki |
| 18:30 EEST (UTC+3) | Zeneli 13', 32' (pen.); Sorsa 27'; Forssell 50', 68'; Savage 84' | Report | Byskata (yellow card) 53'; Andersson (yellow card) 72'; Thompson (yellow card) 73'; Bernardo 80'; Ibrahim (yellow card) 89' | Stadium: Sonera Stadium; Attendance: 3,421; Referee: Dennis Antamo |

| 16 September 2013 27 | FC Lahti | 0 – 2 | HJK | Lahti |
| 18:30 EEST (UTC+3) | Sinisalo (yellow card) 37' | Report | Zeneli (yellow card) 16'; Sorsa (yellow card) 43'; Lod 44', 71' | Stadium: Kisapuisto; Attendance: 3,968; Referee: Petteri Kari |

| 22 September 2013 28 | HJK | 3 – 1 | TPS | Helsinki |
| 18:30 EEST (UTC+3) | Moren 26', 46'; Wallén (yellow card) 36'; Schüller 74' | Report | Lähde 24'; M. Louanto (yellow card) 41'; Márcio Lima (yellow card) 82' | Stadium: Sonera Stadium; Attendance: 5,211; Referee: Tero Nieminen |

| 26 September 2013 29 | TPS | 0 – 3 | HJK | Turku |
| 18:30 EEST (UTC+3) | Tanska (yellow card) 5'; Ääritalo (yellow card) 21'; Márcio Lima (yellow card) 48'; Brown (yellow card) 71' | Report | Väyrynen 32'; Mattila 49' (pen.); Schüller 60' | Stadium: Veritas Stadion; Attendance: 1,523; Referee: Dennis Antamo |

| 30 September 2013 30 | VPS | 1 – 1 | HJK | Vaasa |
| 18:30 EEST (UTC+3) | Ameobi 13' | Report | Lod 33' | Stadium: Hietalahti Stadium; Attendance: 3,268; Referee: Mattias Gestranius |

| 6 October 2013 31 | HJK | 3 – 0 | RoPS | Helsinki |
| 18:30 EEST (UTC+3) | Sumusalo (yellow card) 21'; Forssell 54'; Savage 62'; Zeneli (yellow card) 69'; Mannström 81' | Report | Okkonen (yellow card) 54'; Obilor (yellow card) 67' | Stadium: Sonera Stadium; Attendance: 7,110; Referee: Dennis Antamo |

| 20 October 2013 32 | JJK | 0 – 5 | HJK | Jyväskylä |
| 14:00 EEST (UTC+3) | Viren (yellow card) 80' | Report | Sorsa 16'; Zeneli 23', 61'; Markkanen 46'; Schüller 70' | Stadium: Harjun stadion Attendance: 1,810; Referee: Ville Nevalainen |

| 26 October 2013 33 | HJK | 4 – 2 | KuPS | Helsinki |
| 14:00 EEST (UTC+3) | Forssell 6', 54', 89'; Mannström 39'; Mattila (yellow card) 52' | Report | Hakola 27'; Paananen 28'; Colley (yellow card) 88' | Stadium: Sonera Stadium; Attendance: 4,329; Referee: Petteri Kari |

==== League table ====
| Pos | Team | Pld | W | D | L | GF | GA | GD | Pts | Qualification or relegation |
|---|---|---|---|---|---|---|---|---|---|---|
| 1 | HJK (C) | 33 | 22 | 7 | 4 | 78 | 25 | +53 | 73 | Qualification to Champions League second qualifying round |
| 2 | FC Honka | 33 | 18 | 7 | 8 | 51 | 37 | +14 | 61 | Qualification to Europa League first qualifying round |
| 3 | VPS | 33 | 14 | 9 | 10 | 41 | 39 | +2 | 51 | Qualification to Europa League first qualifying round |
| 4 | IFK Mariehamn | 33 | 14 | 7 | 12 | 57 | 62 | −5 | 49 | |
| 5 | FC Lahti | 33 | 15 | 3 | 15 | 47 | 49 | −2 | 48 | |

Source: veikkausliiga.com
Rules for classification: 1) points; 2) goal difference; 3) number of goals scored.
(C) Champions

=== Finnish Cup ===
| 5 April 2013 Fifth round | HJK | 2 – 1 | FF Jaro | Helsinki |
| 17:00 EEST (UTC+3) | Moren 22'; Schüller (yellow card) 45+1' (goal) 82' | Report | Skrabb (yellow card) 33'; Kullström 44'; K. Peth (yellow card) 49' | Stadium: Talin halli Attendance: 348; Referee: Toni Ollikainen |

| 25 April 2013 Sixth Round | RoPS | 1 – 0 | HJK | Rovaniemi |
| 18:30 EEST (UTC+3) | Saxman 56'; Turcios (yellow card) 77'; Lahtinen (yellow card) 82' | Report | | Stadium: Rovaniemen keskuskenttä Attendance: 1,387; Referee: Tero Nieminen |

=== League Cup ===
==== Group 2 ====
| Pos | Team | Pld | W | D | L | GF | GA | GD | Pts | HJK | MYP | HON | MAR |
|---|---|---|---|---|---|---|---|---|---|---|---|---|---|
| 1 | Helsingin Jalkapalloklubi (A) | 6 | 5 | 0 | 1 | 17 | 1 | +16 | 15 | | 2–0 | 4–0 | 6–0 |
| 2 | MYPA (A) | 6 | 4 | 1 | 1 | 9 | 5 | +4 | 13 | 1–0 | | 4–1 | 1–0 |
| 3 | FC Honka | 6 | 2 | 1 | 3 | 10 | 16 | −6 | 7 | 0–1 | 2–2 | | 4–3 |
| 4 | IFK Mariehamn | 6 | 0 | 0 | 6 | 5 | 19 | −14 | 0 | 0–4 | 0–1 | 2–3 | |

Updated to match(es) played on 6 March 2013. Source: veikkausliiga.com
Legend: Blue = home team win; Yellow = draw; Red = away team win.
Rules for classification: 1) points 2) head-to-head points 3) head-to-head goal difference 4) head-to-head number of goals scored 5) goal difference 6) number of goals scored
(A) Advance to a further round

| 17 January 2013 1 | FC Honka | 0 – 1 | HJK | Vantaa |
| 14:00 EET (UTC+2) | Rexhepi (yellow card) 44'; A. Taar (yellow card) 77' | Report | Mannström 8'; Schüller (yellow card) 82'; Bulatović (yellow card) 85' | Stadium: Myyrmäki halli Attendance: 450; Referee: Jari Järvinen |

| 3 February 2013 2 | HJK | 2 – 0 | MYPA | Helsinki |
| 16:30 EET (UTC+2) | Perovuo 60' (yellow card) 69'; Forssell 72'; Lod (yellow card) 86' | Report | Gela (yellow card) 67' | Stadium: Talin halli Attendance: 635; Referee: Tero Nieminen |

| 8 February 2013 3 | HJK | 4 – 0 | FC Honka | Helsinki |
| 14:30 EET (UTC+2) | Zeneli 8'; Lindström (yellow card) 34'; Savage 35', 86'; Pelvas 39'; Lahti (yellow card) 54' | Report | Rexhepi (yellow card) 16' (yellow-red card) 74'; Yaghoubi (yellow card) 25' | Stadium: Talin halli Attendance: 406; Referee: Mattias Gestranius |

| 27 February 2013 4 | HJK | 6 – 0 | IFK Mariehamn | Helsinki |
| 14:30 EET (UTC+2) | Forssell 22', 54'; Zeneli 58', 60'; Savage 62'; Pelvas 84' | Report | L. Mondino (yellow card) 38'; Amani (yellow card) 43' (yellow-red card) 50'; Assis (yellow card) 59' | Stadium: Talin halli Attendance: 324; Referee: Petteri Kari |

| 2 March 2013 5 | MYPA | 1 – 0 | HJK | Kouvola |
| 15:00 EET (UTC+2) | Gela (yellow card) 24'; Sihvola 65' | Report | Kansikas (yellow card) 55'; Sumusalo (yellow card) 86' (yellow-red card) 88'; Savage (yellow card) 89' | Stadium: Saviniemen jalkapallostadion Attendance: 200; Referee: Tero Nieminen |

| 6 March 2013 6 | MYPA | 0 – 4 | HJK | Eckerö |
| 19:00 EET (UTC+2) | Assis (yellow card) 85' | Report | Savage 17'; Pelvas 52'; Alho 70', 85' | Stadium: Eckeröhallen; Attendance: 370; Referee: Mikko Leino |

==== Knockout stages ====
| 9 March 2013 Quarterfinal | HJK | 0 – 0 (5 – 6 p) | JJK Jyväskylä | Helsinki |
| 14:30 EET (UTC+2) | Lahti (yellow card) 25'; Mannström (yellow card) 81'; Tainio (yellow card) 86' | Report | M. Innanen (yellow card) 87'; Hilska (yellow card) 89' | Stadium: Talin halli Attendance: 369; Referee: Miikka Lähdesmäki |

=== UEFA Champions League ===
==== Qualifying phase ====
| 17 July 2013 2nd Qualifying Round 1st leg | HJK (Finland) | 0 – 0 | (Estonia) Nõmme Kalju | Helsinki, Finland |
| 18:30 EEST (UTC+3) | Tainio (yellow card) 86'; Kansikas (yellow card) 89' | Report | Šišov (yellow card) 76' | Stadium: Sonera Stadium; Attendance: 7,011; Referee: Jovan Kaludjerovic (Montenegro) |

| 23 July 2013 2nd Qualifying Round 2nd leg | Nõmme Kalju (Estonia) | 2 – 1 (2 – 1 agg.) | (Finland) HJK | Tallinn, Estonia |
| 18:30 EEST (UTC+3) | Ceesay 28'; Quintieri 35'; Teleš (yellow card) 90'; Bärengrub (yellow card) 90+2' | Report | Mattila (yellow card) 56'; Savage 64' | Stadium: Kadrioru staadion Attendance: 4,880; Referee: Milenko Vukadinović (Serbia) |

== Squad statistics ==
As of Match played 26 October 2013

=== Appearances and goals ===
| No. | Pos | Nat | Player | Total | | Veikkausliiga | | Finnish Cup | | League Cup | | Champions League | |
| No. | Pos | Nat | Player | Apps | Goals | Apps | Goals | Apps | Goals | Apps | Goals | Apps | Goals |
|---|---|---|---|---|---|---|---|---|---|---|---|---|---|
| 1 | GK | (Finland) FIN | Ville Wallén | 40 | 0 | 32 | 0 | 2 | 0 | 4 | 0 | 2 | 0 |
| 2 | DF | (Finland) FIN | Tuomas Kansikas | 21 | 0 | 10+5 | 0 | 1 | 0 | 3 | 0 | 2 | 0 |
| 3 | DF | (Finland) FIN | Valtteri Moren | 36 | 5 | 27 | 4 | 1+1 | 1 | 2+3 | 0 | 2 | 0 |
| 4 | MF | (Finland) FIN | Mika Väyrynen | 6 | 0 | 1+2 | 0 | 0 | 0 | 3 | 0 | 0 | 0 |
| 5 | DF | (Finland) FIN | Tapio Heikkilä | 37 | 1 | 31 | 1 | 1 | 0 | 3 | 0 | 2 | 0 |
| 6 | DF | (Finland) FIN | Timi Lahti | 11 | 0 | 1+3 | 0 | 1 | 0 | 5+1 | 0 | 0 | 0 |
| 7 | MF | (Finland) FIN | Sebastian Mannström | 30 | 3 | 13+9 | 2 | 1 | 0 | 5+2 | 1 | 0 | 0 |
| 8 | FW | (Finland) FIN | Erfan Zeneli | 40 | 14 | 30+1 | 11 | 2 | 0 | 5 | 3 | 2 | 0 |
| 9 | FW | (Finland) FIN | Mikael Forssell | 36 | 17 | 19+8 | 14 | 1+1 | 0 | 4+1 | 3 | 0+2 | 0 |
| 10 | MF | (Finland) FIN | Teemu Tainio | 26 | 2 | 19+1 | 2 | 2 | 0 | 3 | 0 | 1 | 0 |
| 11 | DF | (Finland) FIN | Mathias Lindström | 21 | 0 | 9+4 | 0 | 1 | 0 | 5+1 | 0 | 0+1 | 0 |
| 14 | FW | (Finland) FIN | Eero Markkanen | 6 | 1 | 1+5 | 1 | 0 | 0 | 0 | 0 | 0 | 0 |
| 17 | DF | (Finland) FIN | Nikolai Alho | 31 | 5 | 11+12 | 3 | 0 | 0 | 2+4 | 2 | 0+2 | 0 |
| 21 | DF | (Finland) FIN | Mikko Sumusalo | 36 | 1 | 27 | 1 | 1+1 | 0 | 3+2 | 0 | 2 | 0 |
| 22 | MF | (Finland) FIN | Joel Perovuo | 30 | 3 | 10+12 | 2 | 1+1 | 0 | 4 | 1 | 1+1 | 0 |
| 25 | MF | (Finland) FIN | Sakari Mattila | 22 | 5 | 14+6 | 5 | 0 | 0 | 0 | 0 | 2 | 0 |
| 26 | FW | (The Gambia) GAM | Demba Savage | 38 | 16 | 26+2 | 11 | 2 | 0 | 5+1 | 4 | 2 | 1 |
| 27 | DF | (Finland) FIN | Sebastian Sorsa | 36 | 2 | 28 | 2 | 2 | 0 | 6 | 0 | 0 | 0 |
| 28 | MF | (Finland) FIN | Rasmus Schüller | 33 | 8 | 21+2 | 7 | 2 | 1 | 5+1 | 0 | 2 | 0 |
| 31 | MF | (Finland) FIN | Robin Lod | 33 | 7 | 19+9 | 7 | 0 | 0 | 3+2 | 0 | 0 | 0 |
| 35 | GK | (Finland) FIN | Saku-Pekka Sahlgren | 3 | 0 | 1 | 0 | 0 | 0 | 2 | 0 | 0 | 0 |
Players from Klubi-04 who appeared:
| 25 | DF | (Finland) FIN | Pauli Loukola | 1 | 0 | 0 | 0 | 0 | 0 | 0+1 | 0 | 0 | 0 |
| 32 | DF | (Finland) FIN | Felipe Aspegren | 2 | 0 | 0 | 0 | 0 | 0 | 0+2 | 0 | 0 | 0 |
| 58 | MF | (Finland) FIN | Fredrik Lassas | 1 | 0 | 0+1 | 0 | 0 | 0 | 0 | 0 | 0 | 0 |
Players away from the club on loan:
| 15 | FW | (Finland) FIN | Akseli Pelvas | 9 | 3 | 0+4 | 0 | 0 | 0 | 3+2 | 3 | 0 | 0 |
| 20 | FW | (Finland) FIN | Joel Pohjanpalo | 28 | 5 | 13+8 | 5 | 1+1 | 0 | 1+2 | 0 | 2 | 0 |
Players who left HJK during the season:
| 5 | DF | (Serbia) SRB | Radoš Bulatović | 1 | 0 | 0 | 0 | 0 | 0 | 0+1 | 0 | 0 | 0 |
| 36 | GK | (Germany) GER | Kristian Nicht | 1 | 0 | 0 | 0 | 0 | 0 | 1 | 0 | 0 | 0 |

=== Goal scorers ===
| Place | Position | Nation | Number | Name | Veikkausliiga | Finnish Cup | League Cup | UEFA Champions League | Total |
|---|---|---|---|---|---|---|---|---|---|
| 1 | FW | (Finland) | 9 | Mikael Forssell | 14 | 0 | 3 | 0 | 17 |
| 2 | FW | (The Gambia) | 26 | Demba Savage | 11 | 0 | 4 | 1 | 16 |
| 3 | FW | (Finland) | 8 | Erfan Zeneli | 11 | 0 | 3 | 0 | 14 |
| 4 | MF | (Finland) | 28 | Rasmus Schüller | 7 | 1 | 0 | 0 | 8 |
| 5 | MF | (Finland) | 31 | Robin Lod | 7 | 0 | 0 | 0 | 7 |
| 6 | DF | (Finland) | 3 | Valtteri Moren | 4 | 1 | 0 | 0 | 5 |
| 6 | FW | (Finland) | 17 | Nikolai Alho | 3 | 0 | 2 | 0 | 5 |
| 6 | FW | (Finland) | 20 | Joel Pohjanpalo | 5 | 0 | 0 | 0 | 5 |
| 6 | FW | (Finland) | 25 | Sakari Mattila | 5 | 0 | 0 | 0 | 5 |
| 10 | MF | (Finland) | 7 | Sebastian Mannström | 2 | 0 | 1 | 0 | 3 |
| 10 | FW | (Finland) | 15 | Akseli Pelvas | 0 | 0 | 3 | 0 | 3 |
| 10 | MF | (Finland) | 22 | Joel Perovuo | 2 | 0 | 1 | 0 | 3 |
| 13 | MF | (Finland) | 10 | Teemu Tainio | 2 | 0 | 0 | 0 | 2 |
| 13 | DF | (Finland) | 27 | Sebastian Sorsa | 2 | 0 | 0 | 0 | 2 |
| 15 | DF | (Finland) | 5 | Tapio Heikkilä | 1 | 0 | 0 | 0 | 1 |
| 15 | FW | (Finland) | 14 | Eero Markkanen | 1 | 0 | 0 | 0 | 1 |
| 15 | DF | (Finland) | 21 | Mikko Sumusalo | 1 | 0 | 0 | 0 | 1 |
| | | | | TOTALS | 78 | 2 | 17 | 1 | 98 |

=== Clean sheets ===
| Place | Position | Nation | Number | Name | Veikkausliiga | Finnish Cup | League Cup | UEFA Champions League | Total |
|---|---|---|---|---|---|---|---|---|---|
| 1 | GK | (Finland) | 1 | Ville Wallén | 15 | 0 | 4 | 1 | 20 |
| 2 | GK | (Finland) | 35 | Saku-Pekka Sahlgren | 1 | 0 | 1 | 0 | 2 |
| 3 | GK | (Germany) | 36 | Kristian Nicht | 0 | 0 | 1 | 0 | 1 |
| | | | | TOTALS | 16 | 0 | 6 | 1 | 23 |

=== Disciplinary record ===
| Number | Nation | Position | Name | Veikkausliiga | | Finnish Cup | | League Cup | | UEFA Champions League | | Total | |
| Number | Nation | Position | Name | Yellow card | Red card | Yellow card | Red card | Yellow card | Red card | Yellow card | Red card | Yellow card | Red card |
| 1 | (Finland) | GK | Ville Wallén | 1 | 0 | 0 | 0 | 0 | 0 | 0 | 0 | 1 | 0 |
| 2 | (Finland) | DF | Tuomas Kansikas | 1 | 0 | 0 | 0 | 1 | 0 | 1 | 0 | 3 | 0 |
| 3 | (Finland) | DF | Valtteri Moren | 3 | 0 | 0 | 0 | 0 | 0 | 0 | 0 | 3 | 0 |
| 5 | (Finland) | DF | Tapio Heikkilä | 4 | 0 | 0 | 0 | 0 | 0 | 0 | 0 | 4 | 0 |
| 6 | (Finland) | DF | Timi Lahti | 0 | 0 | 0 | 0 | 2 | 0 | 0 | 0 | 2 | 0 |
| 7 | (Finland) | MF | Sebastian Mannström | 2 | 0 | 0 | 0 | 1 | 0 | 0 | 0 | 3 | 0 |
| 8 | (Finland) | FW | Erfan Zeneli | 6 | 0 | 0 | 0 | 0 | 0 | 0 | 0 | 6 | 0 |
| 9 | (Finland) | FW | Mikael Forssell | 1 | 0 | 0 | 0 | 0 | 0 | 0 | 0 | 1 | 0 |
| 10 | (Finland) | MF | Teemu Tainio | 0 | 1 | 0 | 0 | 1 | 0 | 1 | 0 | 2 | 1 |
| 11 | (Finland) | DF | Mathias Lindström | 2 | 0 | 0 | 0 | 1 | 0 | 0 | 0 | 3 | 0 |
| 21 | (Finland) | DF | Mikko Sumusalo | 4 | 0 | 0 | 0 | 2 | 1 | 0 | 0 | 6 | 1 |
| 22 | (Finland) | MF | Joel Perovuo | 0 | 0 | 0 | 0 | 1 | 0 | 0 | 0 | 1 | 0 |
| 25 | (Finland) | MF | Sakari Mattila | 4 | 0 | 0 | 0 | 0 | 0 | 1 | 0 | 5 | 0 |
| 26 | (The Gambia) | FW | Demba Savage | 3 | 0 | 0 | 0 | 1 | 0 | 0 | 0 | 4 | 0 |
| 27 | (Finland) | DF | Sebastian Sorsa | 4 | 0 | 0 | 0 | 0 | 0 | 0 | 0 | 4 | 0 |
| 28 | (Finland) | MF | Rasmus Schüller | 3 | 0 | 1 | 0 | 1 | 0 | 0 | 0 | 5 | 0 |
| 31 | (Finland) | MF | Robin Lod | 1 | 0 | 0 | 0 | 1 | 0 | 0 | 0 | 2 | 0 |
Players away on loan:
Players who left HJK during the season:
| 5 | (Serbia) | DF | Radoš Bulatović | 0 | 0 | 0 | 0 | 1 | 0 | 0 | 0 | 1 | 0 |
| | | | TOTALS | 39 | 1 | 1 | 0 | 13 | 1 | 3 | 0 | 56 | 2 |
