= 2017 HJK season =

HJK
2017 season
- Chairman: Olli-Pekka Lyytikäinen
- Manager: Mika Lehkosuo
- Stadium: Telia 5G -areena
- Veikkausliiga: Champions
- Finnish Cup: Champions
- UEFA Europa League: Second qualifying round vs KF Shkëndija
- Top goalscorer: League: Akseli Pelvas (14); All: Akseli Pelvas (24)
- Highest home attendance: League: 10,500 (31 July 2017 vs HIFK, Veikkausliiga)
- Lowest home attendance: League: 2,912 (23 July 2017 vs PS Kemi, Veikkausliiga)
- Average home league attendance: 4,779
Home colours	Away colours

The 2017 season is Helsingin Jalkapalloklubi's 109th competitive season. HJK are Finlands most successful football club in terms of titles, with 27 Finnish Championships, 12 Finnish Cup titles, 5 Finnish League Cup titles, one appearance in the UEFA Champions League group stages and one appearance in the UEFA Europa League group stages.

After finishing 2nd in the 2016 Veikkausliiga season, HJK entered the 2017–18 UEFA Europa League first qualifying round.

== Squad ==
As of 31 August 2017

No.	Name	Nationality	Position	Date of birth (age)	Previous club
Goalkeepers
21	Thomas Dähne	(Germany)	GK	January 4, 1994 (age 32)	(Germany) RB Leipzig
29	Markus Uusitalo	(Finland)	GK	May 15, 1997 (age 29)	(Finland) VPS
35	Jesse Koivistoinen	(Finland)	GK	December 31, 1997 (age 28)	(Finland) Klubi-04
Defenders
4	Hannu Patronen	(Finland)	DF	May 23, 1984 (age 42)	(Norway) Sogndal
8	Rafinha (captain)	(Brazil)	DF	June 29, 1982 (age 44)	(Belgium) Gent
15	Ville Jalasto	(Finland)	DF	April 19, 1986 (age 40)	(Norway) Stabæk
16	Aapo Halme	(Finland)	DF	May 22, 1998 (age 28)	(Finland) Klubi-04
18	Roni Peiponen	(Finland)	DF	April 9, 1997 (age 29)	Loan from (Norway) Molde
25	Valtteri Vesiaho	(Finland)	DF	February 10, 1999 (age 27)	(Finland) Klubi-04
32	Faith Friday Obilor	(Nigeria)	DF	March 5, 1991 (age 35)	(Finland) Inter Turku
33	Henrik Ölander	(Finland)	DF	October 29, 1997 (age 29)	(Finland) Klubi-04
66	Juha Pirinen	(Finland)	DF	October 22, 1991 (age 35)	(Finland) RoPS
Midfielders
7	Moshtagh Yaghoubi	(Finland)	MF	November 8, 1994 (age 32)	(Latvia) Spartaks Jūrmala
10	Atomu Tanaka	(Japan)	MF	October 4, 1987 (age 39)	(Japan) Albirex Niigata
14	Sebastian Dahlström	(Finland)	MF	November 5, 1996 (age 30)	(Finland) Klubi-04
19	Lucas Lingman	(Finland)	MF	January 25, 1998 (age 28)	(Finland) Klubi-04
20	Vincent Onovo	(Nigeria)	MF	December 10, 1995 (age 30)	(Finland) Inter Turku
22	Anthony Annan	(Ghana)	MF	July 21, 1986 (age 40)	(Norway) Stabæk
27	Filip Valenčič	(Slovenia)	MF	January 7, 1992 (age 34)	(Finland) PS Kemi
28	Rasmus Schüller	(Finland)	MF	June 18, 1991 (age 35)	Loan from (United States) Minnesota United
36	Eetu Vertainen	(Finland)	MF	May 11, 1999 (age 27)	(Finland) Klubi-04
Forwards
9	Demba Savage	(The Gambia)	FW	June 17, 1988 (age 38)	(Sweden) Häcken
17	Ousman Jallow	(The Gambia)	FW	October 21, 1988 (age 38)	(Kazakhstan) Irtysh Pavlodar
31	Akseli Pelvas	(Finland)	FW	February 8, 1989 (age 37)	(Sweden) Falkenbergs FF
38	Enoch Banza	(Republic of the Congo)	FW	February 4, 2000 (age 26)	(Finland) Klubi-04
77	Evans Mensah	(Ghana)	FW	February 9, 1998 (age 28)	(Ghana) Inter Allies

=== On loan ===
Note: Flags indicate national team as defined under FIFA eligibility rules; some limited exceptions apply. Players may hold more than one non-FIFA nationality.

No. / Pos. / Nation / Player; 34 / FW / FIN / Lassi Lappalainen (on loan at RoPS until end of season)	No. / Pos. / Nation / Player

== Transfers ==
=== Winter ===
In: Note: Flags indicate national team as defined under FIFA eligibility rules; some limited exceptions apply. Players may hold more than one non-FIFA nationality.

No.	Pos.	Nation	Player
4	DF	FIN	Hannu Patronen (from (Norway) Sogndal)
7	MF	FIN	Moshtagh Yaghoubi (from (Latvia) Spartaks Jūrmala)
9	FW	GAM	Demba Savage (from (Sweden) Häcken)
11	FW	COL	Alfredo Morelos (from (Colombia) Independiente Medellín, previously on loan)
32	DF	NGR	Faith Friday Obilor (from (Finland) Inter Turku)
66	DF	FIN	Juha Pirinen (from (Finland) RoPS)
77	FW	GHA	Evans Mensah (from (Ghana) International Allies, previously on loan)

Out: Note: Flags indicate national team as defined under FIFA eligibility rules; some limited exceptions apply. Players may hold more than one non-FIFA nationality.

No.	Pos.	Nation	Player
3	DF	NGR	Taye Taiwo (to (Switzerland) Lausanne-Sport)
5	DF	KOS	Lum Rexhepi (to (Netherlands) Go Ahead Eagles)
6	MF	FIN	Obed Malolo (to (Finland) SJK)
7	FW	FIN	Nikolai Alho (to (Sweden) Halmstad)
9	FW	FIN	Mikael Forssell (to (Finland) HIFK)
13	MF	FIN	Toni Kolehmainen (to (Poland) Wisła Puławy)
14	DF	SRB	Ivan Tatomirović (to (Finland) RoPS)
25	GK	FIN	Jiri Koski (to (Finland) KTP)
27	DF	FIN	Sebastian Sorsa (to (Finland) KuPS)
28	MF	FIN	Saku Ylätupa (loan to (Finland) RoPS)
90	FW	NGR	Nnamdi Oduamadi (loan return to (Italy) A.C. Milan)

Trial: Note: Flags indicate national team as defined under FIFA eligibility rules; some limited exceptions apply. Players may hold more than one non-FIFA nationality.

No.	Pos.	Nation	Player
27	MF	BRA	Lucas Kaufmann

=== Summer ===
In: Note: Flags indicate national team as defined under FIFA eligibility rules; some limited exceptions apply. Players may hold more than one non-FIFA nationality.

No.	Pos.	Nation	Player
11	FW	CIV	Jean-Jacques Bougouhi (from (Russia) Ural Yekaterinburg)
27	MF	SLO	Filip Valenčič (from (Finland) PS Kemi)
28	MF	FIN	Saku Ylätupa (loan return from (Finland) RoPS)
28	MF	FIN	Rasmus Schüller (loan from (United States) Minnesota United)

Out: Note: Flags indicate national team as defined under FIFA eligibility rules; some limited exceptions apply. Players may hold more than one non-FIFA nationality.

No.	Pos.	Nation	Player
11	FW	COL	Alfredo Morelos (to (Scotland) Rangers)
11	FW	CIV	Jean-Jacques Bougouhi (to (Turkey) İstanbulspor)
28	MF	FIN	Saku Ylätupa (to (Netherlands) Ajax)
34	FW	FIN	Lassi Lappalainen (loan to (Finland) RoPS)

== Friendlies ==
7 February 2017	(Sweden) Hammarby Fotboll	2 – 3	(Finland) HJK	Stockholm, Sweden
20:00 EET (UTC+2)		Report	Pelvas 62'; Morelos 72'; Jallow 80'	Stadium: Tele2 Arena

9 February 2017	(Sweden) IFK Norrköping	4 – 3	(Finland) HJK	Stockholm, Sweden
20:00 EET (UTC+2)		Report	Dahlström 53', 57'; Pirinen 70'	Stadium: Tele2 Arena

9 March 2017	(Norway) Rosenborg	2 – 1	(Finland) HJK	Marbella, Spain
EET (UTC+2)		Report	Morelos 63'

24 March 2017	(Finland) HJK	3 – 0	(Estonia) Infonet	Helsinki
16:15 EET (UTC+2)	Mensah 11', 33'; Savage 90'	Report		Stadium: Sonera Stadium

== Competitions ==
=== Veikkausliiga ===
==== League table ====
Pos	Team	Pld	W	D	L	GF	GA	GD	Pts	Qualification or relegation
1	HJK (C)	33	23	7	3	78	16	+62	76	Qualification for the Champions League first qualifying round
2	KuPS	33	16	8	9	51	36	+15	56	Qualification for the Europa League first qualifying round (Note: Since HJK, winners of the 2016–17 Finnish Cup, qualified for the Champions League first qualifying round, the spot awarded to the cup winner (Europa League first qualifying round) is passed to the next best-placed team (in this case to the fourth-placed team).)
3	Ilves	33	15	11	7	39	35	+4	56	Qualification for the Europa League first qualifying round
4	Lahti	33	12	13	8	46	31	+15	49	Qualification for the Europa League first qualifying round
5	IFK Mariehamn	33	13	10	10	44	42	+2	49	

Updated to match(es) played on 28 October 2017. Source: Veikkausliiga (in Finnish), Soccerway
Rules for classification: 1) Points; 2) Goal difference; 3) Goals scored; 4) Head-to-head points; 5) Head-to-head goal difference; 6) Head-to-head away goals scored; 7) Play-off
(Note: Play-off is only played if need to decide champion, teams for relegation or UEFA competition and will be played on a neutral ground).
(C) Champions

==== Results summary ====
Overall								Home						Away					
Pld	W	D	L	GF	GA	GD	Pts	W	D	L	GF	GA	GD	W	D	L	GF	GA	GD
33	23	7	3	78	16	+62	76	13	2	2	40	7	+33	10	5	1	38	9	+29

Last updated: 28 October 2017.
Source: See Results

==== Results by matchday ====
Round	1	2	3	4	5	6	7	8	9	10	11	12	13	14	15	16	17	18	19	20	21	22	23	24	25	26	27	28	29	30	31	32	33
Ground	H	H	A	A	H	A	H	H	A	A	H	A	H	A	H	A	A	H	H	H	A	H	A	H	A	H	A	H	H	A	H	A	H
Result	W	W	D	W	D	L	W	W	D	D	W	W	W	W	W	D	D	W	W	D	W	L	W	W	W	W	W	W	W	W	W	W	L

Updated to match(es) played on 28 October 2017. Source: See Results
A = Away; H = Home; W = Win; D = Draw; L = Loss

==== Results ====
5 April 2017 1	HJK	5 – 0	VPS	Helsinki
18:30 EEST (UTC+3)	Yaghoubi (yellow card) 31'; Morelos 32'; Tanaka 40', 64'; Lampi 44' (o.g.); Pelvas 54' (pen.)	Report		Stadium: Telia 5G -areena Attendance: 4,123; Referee: Petri Viljanen

10 April 2017 2	HJK	2 – 0	KuPS	Helsinki
18:30 EEST (UTC+3)	Pelvas 36' (pen.); Morelos 74' (yellow card) 82'	Report	Sorsa (yellow card) 60'	Stadium: Telia 5G -areena Attendance: 3,214; Referee: Oskari Hämäläinen

15 April 2017 3	IFK Mariehamn	1 – 1	HJK	Mariehamn
16:00 EEST (UTC+3)	Kojola (yellow card) 11'; Sellin (yellow card) 14'; Petrović (yellow card) 43'; Span 74'	Report	Obilor 31' (yellow card) 41'; Yaghoubi (yellow card) 80'	Stadium: Wiklöf Holding Arena; Attendance: 1,360; Referee: Marko Grönholm

23 April 2017 4	JJK	1 – 5	HJK	Jyväskylä
17:00 EEST (UTC+3)	E.Ahde 58'	Report	Halme 6'; Mensah 60', 71'; Annan 65'; Morelos 83'	Stadium: Harjun stadion Attendance: 2,346; Referee: Dennis Antamo

29 April 2017 5	HJK	1 – 1	Inter Turku	Helsinki
16:00 EEST (UTC+3)	Morelos 27'; Yaghoubi (yellow card) 65'; Rafinha (yellow card) 81'; Obilor (yellow card) 85'	Report	Kanakoudis (yellow card) 70'; Henrique (yellow card) 79'; Furuholm 90+3'	Stadium: Telia 5G -areena Attendance: 3,721; Referee: Atte Jussila

6 May 2017 6	VPS	2 – 1	HJK	Vaasa
17:00 EEST (UTC+3)	Strandvall (yellow card) 36' (goal) 41' (pen.); Lähde (yellow card) 49'; J.Vahtera 55'	Report	Rafinha (yellow card) 40'; Morelos 52' (yellow card) 71'; Annan (yellow card) 70'; Yaghoubi (yellow card) 86'	Stadium: Hietalahti Stadium; Attendance: 2,689; Referee: Oskari Hämäläinen

11 May 2017 7	HJK	2 – 0	Ilves	Helsinki
18:30 EEST (UTC+3)	Morelos 9', 73'; Patronen (yellow card) 11'	Report	Ayarna (yellow card) 43'	Stadium: Telia 5G -areena Attendance: 4,111; Referee: Dennis Antamo

19 May 2017 8	PS Kemi Kings	0 – 1	HJK	Kemi
18:00 EEST (UTC+3)	Valenčič (yellow card) 32'; Ojala (yellow card) 68'; Salazar (yellow card) 76'	Report	Morelos 7' (yellow card) 42'; Patronen (yellow card) 81'	Stadium: Sauvosaaren Urheilupuisto; Attendance: 777; Referee: Kalle Mäkinen

23 May 2017 9	HIFK	0 – 0	HJK	Helsinki
18:30 EEST (UTC+3)	K.Raimi (yellow card) 34'	Report	Pirinen (yellow card) 28'; Mensah (yellow card) 67'	Stadium: Telia 5G -areena Attendance: 10,500; Referee: Antti Munukka

27 May 2017 10	Lahti	0 – 0	HJK	Lahti
15:00 EEST (UTC+3)	Sesay (yellow card) 90'	Report	Onovo (yellow card) 45'	Stadium: Lahti Stadium; Attendance: 3,065; Referee: Jani Laaksonen

31 May 2017 11	HJK	6 – 0	SJK	Helsinki
18:30 EEST (UTC+3)	Onovo 1'; Mensah 8'; Jalasto 12'; Yaghoubi 23'; Morelos 58', 90'	Report	Hetemaj (yellow card) 15'	Stadium: Telia 5G -areena Attendance: 5,575; Referee: Ville Nevalainen

4 June 2017 12	RoPS	1 – 4	HJK	Rovaniemi
18:30 EEST (UTC+3)	S.Roiha 63'; Addy (yellow card) 82'	Report	Eze 18' (o.g.); Yaghoubi (yellow card) 46' (goal) 64'; Mensah 61'; Morelos 90+2'	Stadium: Rovaniemen keskuskenttä Attendance: 1,465; Referee: Jari Järvinen

15 June 2017 13	HJK	4 – 0	JJK	Helsinki
18:30 EEST (UTC+3)	Pelvas 7' (yellow card) 47'; Pirinen (red card) 10'; Annan (yellow card) 36'; Onovo 42'; Mensah 71', 83'	Report	Petrescu (yellow card) 65'; Poutiainen (yellow card) 79'	Stadium: Telia 5G -areena Attendance: 3,921; Referee: Oskari Hämäläinen

18 June 2017 14	KuPS	0 – 2	HJK	Kuopio
16:30 EEST (UTC+3)	Egwuekwe (yellow card) 20'; Gabriel (yellow card) 30'; Sorsa (yellow card) 78'	Report	Pelvas 20'; Tanaka (yellow card) 29'; Rafinha (yellow card) 83'; Patronen 87'; Lappalainen (yellow card) 90+1'	Stadium: Kuopio Football Stadium; Attendance: 3,097; Referee: Petri Viljanen

22 June 2017 15	HJK	2 – 0	IFK Mariehamn	Helsinki
18:30 EEST (UTC+3)	Annan (yellow card) 17'; Savage 24'; Pelvas 66' (yellow card) 86'	Report	Friberg (yellow card) 52'	Stadium: Telia 5G -areena Attendance: 3,007; Referee: Mattias Gestranius

2 July 2017 16	Inter Turku	1 – 1	HJK	Turku
18:30 EEST (UTC+3)	García (yellow card) 53'; Nyman (yellow card) 68'; Källman 74'; Mombilo (yellow card) 79'	Report	Mensah (yellow card) 45+1'; Patronen 58'	Stadium: Veritas Stadion; Attendance: 3,062; Referee: Petri Viljanen

16 July 2017 17	Ilves	1 – 1	HJK	Tampere
18:30 EEST (UTC+3)	Hynynen 1'	Report	Yaghoubi (yellow card) 9' (yellow-red card) 48'; Pelvas 52'	Stadium: Tammelan Stadion; Attendance: 5,050; Referee: Mattias Gestranius

23 July 2017 18	HJK	3 – 1	PS Kemi Kings	Helsinki
18:30 EEST (UTC+3)	Rafinha (yellow card) 54'; Jalasto 59'; Pelvas 79'; Valenčič 90+1' (pen.)	Report	Ceesay (yellow card) 61'; R. Karjalainen 64'; David (yellow card) 70'; Kaljumäe (yellow card) 76'; Zea (yellow card) 90+1'	Stadium: Telia 5G -areena Attendance: 2,912; Referee: Jari Järvinen

31 July 2017 19	HJK	2 – 0	HIFK	Helsinki
18:30 EEST (UTC+3)	Patronen 19'; Valenčič 44'	Report	Bäckman (red card) 45'; T. Andberg (yellow card) 77'	Stadium: Telia 5G -areena Attendance: 10,500; Referee: Mattias Gestranius

6 August 2017 20	HJK	0 – 0	Lahti	Helsinki
15:00 EEST (UTC+3)	Rafinha (yellow card) 23'; Halme (yellow card) 34'; Yaghoubi (yellow card) 42'; Annan (yellow card) 45+4'	Report	Jovanović (yellow card) 45+4'; Simonovski (yellow card) 72'; Hauhia (yellow card) 85'	Stadium: Telia 5G -areena Attendance: 3,653; Referee: Jari Järvinen

10 August 2017 21	SJK	0 – 6	HJK	Seinäjoki
20:00 EEST (UTC+3)	Hetemaj (yellow card) 33'; T.Hradecky (yellow card) 90+1'	Report	Rafinha 7'; Yaghoubi (yellow card) 45+3'; Dahlström 59'; Valenčič 63'; Mensah 65'; Pelvas 75', 80' (pen.)	Stadium: OmaSP Stadion; Attendance: 4,005; Referee: Kalle Mäkinen

14 August 2017 22	HJK	0 – 1	RoPS	Helsinki
18:30 EEST (UTC+3)	Pelvas (yellow card) 34'; Jalasto (yellow card) 54'; Dahlström (yellow card) 67'	Report	Trafford (yellow card) 36'; J.Hämäläinen (yellow card) 45+2'; Eze 68'; Stavitski (yellow card) 90+1'	Stadium: Telia 5G -areena Attendance: 9,427; Referee: Atte Jussila

20 August 2017 23	JJK	0 – 4	HJK	Jyväskylä
18:30 EEST (UTC+3)		Report	Savage 2', 66'; Pelvas 72'; Dahlström 81'	Stadium: Harjun stadion Attendance: 2,258; Referee: Mikko Leino

27 August 2017 24	HJK	1 – 0	KuPS	Helsinki
18:30 EEST (UTC+3)	Valenčič (yellow card) 32'; Pelvas 40' (yellow card) 69'	Report	H.Coulibaly (yellow card) 33'; Boxall (yellow card) 36' (yellow-red card) 90+2'; Purje (yellow card) 84'	Stadium: Telia 5G -areena Attendance: 5,521; Referee: Dennis Antamo

8 September 2017 25	VPS	0 – 3	HJK	Vaasa
18:30 EEST (UTC+3)	J. Levänen (yellow card) 90'	Report	Onovo 11'; Mensah 27'; Savage 32'; Dähne (red card) 55'; Annan (yellow card) 77'	Stadium: Hietalahti Stadium; Attendance: 2,759; Referee: Mikko Mörö

12 September 2017 26	HJK	2 – 1	HIFK	Helsinki
18:30 EEST (UTC+3)	Onovo 55'; Annan 76'; Pelvas (yellow card) 86'	Report	Ristola 61'; Bäckman (yellow card) 63'; Halme (yellow card) 73'; Sihvola (yellow card) 84'	Stadium: Telia 5G -areena Attendance: 8,567; Referee: Petri Viljanen

16 September 2017 27	Ilves	1 – 4	HJK	Tampere
17:00 EEST (UTC+3)	Mensah (yellow card) 40'; Noubissi 56'; Ayarna (yellow card) 77'	Report	Savage 9'; Tanaka 45+1'; Valenčič 69', 78'	Stadium: Tammelan Stadion; Attendance: 4,517; Referee: Ville Nevalainen

27 September 2017 28	HJK	1 – 0	IFK Mariehamn	Helsinki
18:30 EEST (UTC+3)	Obilor (yellow card) 11'; Annan 59'	Report	Mantilla (yellow card) 54'	Stadium: Telia 5G -areena Attendance: 3,217; Referee: Dennis Antamo

30 September 2017 29	HJK	4 – 0	PS Kemi Kings	Helsinki
17:00 EEST (UTC+3)	Pelvas 39'; Valenčič 45+1'; Jallow 63', 90+2'; Obilor (yellow card) 73'	Report	Ceesay (yellow card) 50'; Mansally (yellow card) 65'; Guevara (yellow card) 71'	Stadium: Telia 5G -areena Attendance: 3,151; Referee: Toni Pohjoismäki

12 October 2017 30	SJK	0 – 2	HJK	Seinäjoki
20:00 EEST (UTC+3)	Hatakka (yellow card) 53'; Laaksonen (yellow card) 55'; Hurme (yellow card) 77'; Hambo (yellow card) 86'; Klinga (yellow card) 90+3'	Report	Savage 18'; Annan (yellow card) 75'; Lingman 88'	Stadium: OmaSP Stadion; Attendance: 2,135; Referee: Mikko Mörö

16 October 2017 31	HJK	3 – 0	Lahti	Helsinki
18:30 EEST (UTC+3)	Rafinha (yellow card) 27'; Pelvas 37'; Jallow 71', 73'	Report	Kärkkäinen (yellow card) 50'	Stadium: Telia 5G -areena Attendance: 3,521; Referee: Mattias Gestranius

20 October 2017 32	Inter Turku	1 – 3	HJK	Turku
18:30 EEST (UTC+3)	Faubert (yellow card) 7'; Henrique (yellow card) 37'; Furuholm 90+1'; T. Varmanen (yellow card) 90+3'	Report	Dahlström 23'; Obilor 35'; Valenčič 44'	Stadium: Veritas Stadion; Attendance: 1,970; Referee: Petri Viljanen

28 October 2017 33	HJK	2 – 3	RoPS	Helsinki
14:00 EEST (UTC+3)	Pelvas 41'; Rafinha 58'	Report	S.Tukiainen 19', 86'; S.Roiha 64'	Stadium: Telia 5G -areena Attendance: 3,102; Referee: Ville Nevalainen

=== Finnish Cup ===
==== Sixth Round ====
Team	Pld	W	D	L	GF	GA	GD	Pts
HJK	5	5	0	0	18	2	+16	15
FC Honka	5	4	0	1	11	3	+8	12
GrIFK	5	1	2	2	6	9	−3	5
HIFK	5	1	1	3	5	11	−6	4
IF Gnistan	5	1	1	3	2	8	−6	4
KTP	5	0	2	3	2	11	−9	2

28 January 2017 1	HJK	3 – 2	Honka	Helsinki
15:00 EET (UTC+2)	Pelvas 39', 50'; Halme (yellow card) 43' (yellow-red card) 75'; Morelos 84'	Report	M.Ömer (yellow card) 15'; Äijälä (yellow card) 24'; R.Ivanov 65'; Douglas 90+2'	Stadium: Sonera Stadium; Attendance: 852; Referee: Jari Järvinen

2 February 2017 2	Gnistan	0 – 4	HJK	Helsinki
17:00 EET (UTC+2)		Report	Pelvas 13', 45'; Rafinha 43'; Dahlström 64' (pen.); Obilor (yellow card) 72'	Stadium: Talin halli Attendance: 534; Referee: Mohammad Al-Emara

13 February 2017 3	HJK	4 – 0	KTP	Helsinki
19:00 EET (UTC+2)	Pirinen (yellow card) 22'; Tanaka 61'; Morelos 75'; Dahlström 76'; Lappalainen 80'	Report	A.Eerola (yellow card) 29'; M.Tyyskä (yellow card) 31'	Stadium: Sonera Stadium; Attendance: 500; Referee: Mikko Mörö

18 February 2017 4	GrIFK	0 – 3	HJK	Helsinki
14:00 EET (UTC+2)	N.Perera (yellow card) 51'	Report	Morelos 31' (yellow card) 35'; Yaghoubi 52' (pen.); Tanaka 79'	Stadium: Talin halli Attendance: 376; Referee: Mohammad Al-Emara

1 March 2017 5	HJK	4 – 0	HIFK	Helsinki
17:00 EET (UTC+2)	Mensah (yellow card) 26' (goal) 64', 66'; Pelvas 37'; Morelos 90+3'	Report	Lody (yellow card) 38'; Gela (yellow card) 45'; Väyrynen (yellow card) 71'; Eriksson (red card) 87'	Stadium: Sonera Stadium; Attendance: 1,752; Referee: Oskari Hämäläinen

==== Knockout stage ====
19 March 2017 Quarterfinal	IFK Mariehamn	0 – 3	HJK	Mariehamn
17:00 EET (UTC+2)		Report	Yaghoubi 17'; Vaikla 28' (o.g.); Pelvas 42'	Stadium: Eckeröhallen; Attendance: 580; Referee: Marko Grönholm

1 April 2017 Semifinal	Ilves	0 – 1	HJK	Tampere
14:30 EEST (UTC+3)	Tuco (yellow card) 8'; Aspegren (yellow card) 90+4'	Report	Jalasto (yellow card) 40'; Rafinha (yellow card) 53'; Morelos 75'; Annan (yellow card) 90+3'	Stadium: Tammelan Stadion; Attendance: 800; Referee: Kalle Mäkinen

23 September 2017 Final	SJK	0 – 1	HJK	Seinäjoki
17:00 EEST (UTC+3)	Dorman (yellow card) 45'; Malolo (yellow card) 50' (yellow-red card) 79'; Hatakka (yellow card) 83'	Report	V.Vesiaho (yellow card) 28'; Pelvas 77'; Annan (yellow card) 90'; Tanaka (yellow card) 90+3'	Stadium: OmaSP Stadion; Attendance: 3,617; Referee: Marko Grönholm

=== UEFA Europa League ===
==== Qualifying rounds ====
29 June 2017 First qualifying round 1st leg	Connah's Quay Nomads (Wales)	1 – 0	(Finland) HJK	Bangor (Note: Connah's Quay Nomads will play their home match at Nantporth, Bangor, instead of their regular stadium Deeside Stadium, Connah's Quay.), Wales
21:00 EEST (UTC+3)	M.Wilde (yellow card) 34'; Woolfe 40'; J.Owen (yellow card) 47'; S.Smith (yellow card) 54'; G.Horan (yellow card) 84'	Report	Annan (yellow card) 47'	Stadium: Nantporth, Attendance: 472; Referee: Cătălin Gaman (Romania)

6 July 2017 First qualifying round 2nd leg	HJK (Finland)	3 – 0 (3 – 1 agg.)	(Wales) Connah's Quay Nomads	Helsinki, Finland
19:00 EEST (UTC+3)	Yaghoubi 11'; Pelvas 31', 55'	Report	M. Wilde (yellow card) 13'; Harrison (yellow card) 27'; K. Edwards (yellow card) 41'; M. Pearson (yellow card) 52'	Stadium: Telia 5G -areena Attendance: 6,103; Referee: Furkat Atazhanov (Kazakhstan)

13 July 2017 Second qualifying round 1st leg	KF Shkëndija (North Macedonia)	3 – 1	(Finland) HJK	Strumica (Note: Shkëndija play their home matches at Stadion Mladost, Strumica, instead of their regular stadium Ecolog Arena, Tetovo.), Macedonia
19:00 EEST (UTC+3)	Ibraimi 45' (pen.), 59', 64' (pen.); Vujčić (yellow card) 47'; Alimi (yellow card) 50'; Júnior (yellow card) 85'; Abdurahimi (yellow card) 85'	Report	Jallow 35'; Patronen (red card) 63'	Stadium: Stadion Mladost; Attendance: 1,492; Referee: Markus Hameter (Austria)

20 July 2017 Second qualifying round 2nd leg	HJK (Finland)	1 – 1 (2 – 4 agg.)	(North Macedonia) KF Shkëndija	Helsinki, Finland
19:00 EEST (UTC+3)	Radeski 28' (o.g.); Jalasto (yellow card) 45+2'; Onovo (yellow card) 67'	Report	Čeliković 71'; K.Zahov (yellow card) 89'	Stadium: Telia 5G -areena Attendance: 5,326; Referee: Gunnar Jarl Jónsson (Iceland)

== Squad statistics ==
As of Match played 28 October 2017

=== Appearances and goals ===
No.	Pos	Nat	Player	Total		Veikkausliiga		Finnish Cup		Europa League	
No.	Pos	Nat	Player	Apps	Goals	Apps	Goals	Apps	Goals	Apps	Goals
4	DF	(Finland) FIN	Hannu Patronen	22	3	15	3	4	0	3	0
6	DF	(Finland) FIN	Juha Pirinen	40	0	29+1	0	6+1	0	3	0
7	MF	(Finland) FIN	Moshtagh Yaghoubi	23	5	13+3	2	4	2	3	1
8	DF	(Brazil) BRA	Rafinha	43	3	29+2	2	8	1	4	0
9	FW	(The Gambia) GAM	Demba Savage	32	6	17+7	6	3+1	0	4	0
10	MF	(Japan) JPN	Atomu Tanaka	30	5	21+2	3	6+1	2	0	0
14	MF	(Finland) FIN	Sebastian Dahlström	37	5	19+7	3	8	2	2+1	0
15	DF	(Finland) FIN	Ville Jalasto	28	2	18+2	2	5	0	3	0
16	DF	(Finland) FIN	Aapo Halme	15	1	10+3	1	1	0	1	0
17	FW	(The Gambia) GAM	Ousman Jallow	28	5	5+15	4	0+4	0	3+1	1
19	MF	(Finland) FIN	Lucas Lingman	13	1	3+7	1	0+2	0	0+1	0
20	MF	(Nigeria) NGR	Vincent Onovo	34	4	14+10	4	4+2	0	3+1	0
21	GK	(Germany) GER	Thomas Dähne	31	0	22	0	6	0	3	0
22	MF	(Ghana) GHA	Anthony Annan	38	3	28+2	3	3+1	0	4	0
25	DF	(Finland) FIN	Valtteri Vesiaho	9	0	5+1	0	2+1	0	0	0
27	MF	(Slovenia) SLO	Filip Valenčič	18	7	13+3	7	0	0	0+2	0
28	MF	(Finland) FIN	Rasmus Schüller	9	0	4+3	0	2	0	0	0
29	GK	(Finland) FIN	Markus Uusitalo	16	0	11+1	0	3	0	1	0
31	FW	(Finland) FIN	Akseli Pelvas	44	24	26+5	14	8+1	8	4	2
32	DF	(Nigeria) NGR	Faith Friday Obilor	36	2	24	2	9	0	2+1	0
36	MF	(Finland) FIN	Eetu Vertainen	2	0	0+1	0	0+1	0	0	0
38	FW	(Republic of the Congo) CGO	Enoch Banza	7	0	2+5	0	0	0	0	0
47	DF	(Finland) FIN	Jaakko Oksanen	1	0	0+1	0	0	0	0	0
77	FW	(Ghana) GHA	Evans Mensah	40	11	22+7	9	7	2	1+3	0
Players from Klubi-04 who appeared:
38	DF	(Finland) FIN	Samu Laitinen	1	0	0	0	1	0	0	0
Players who left HJK during the season:
6	MF	(Finland) FIN	Obed Malolo	8	0	7+1	0	0	0	0	0
11	FW	(Colombia) COL	Alfredo Morelos	19	16	11+1	11	3+4	5	0	0
11	FW	(Ivory Coast) CIV	Jean-Jacques Bougouhi	5	0	2+3	0	0	0	0	0
27	MF	(Brazil) BRA	Lucas Kaufmann	3	0	0	0	3	0	0	0
28	MF	(Finland) FIN	Saku Ylätupa	3	0	0	0	2+1	0	0	0
Players away from the club on loan:
34	MF	(Finland) FIN	Lassi Lappalainen	7	1	0+1	0	1+4	1	0+1	0

=== Goal scorers ===
Place	Position	Nation	Number	Name	Veikkausliiga	Finnish Cup	Europa League	Total
1	FW	(Finland)	31	Akseli Pelvas	14	8	2	24
2	FW	(Colombia)	11	Alfredo Morelos	11	5	0	16
3	FW	(Ghana)	77	Evans Mensah	8	2	0	10
4	MF	(Slovenia)	27	Filip Valenčič	7	0	0	7
5	FW	(The Gambia)	9	Demba Savage	6	0	0	6
6	MF	(Finland)	7	Moshtagh Yaghoubi	2	2	1	5
6	MF	(Japan)	10	Atomu Tanaka	3	2	0	5
6	MF	(Finland)	14	Sebastian Dahlström	3	2	0	5
6	FW	(The Gambia)	17	Ousman Jallow	4	0	1	5
10	MF	(Nigeria)	20	Vincent Onovo	4	0	0	4
10				Own goal	2	1	1	4
12	DF	(Finland)	4	Hannu Patronen	3	0	0	3
12	MF	(Ghana)	22	Anthony Annan	3	0	0	3
12	DF	(Brazil)	8	Rafinha	2	1	0	3
15	DF	(Finland)	15	Ville Jalasto	2	0	0	2
15	DF	(Nigeria)	32	Faith Friday Obilor	2	0	0	2
17	DF	(Finland)	16	Aapo Halme	1	0	0	1
17	FW	(Finland)	19	Lucas Lingman	1	0	0	1
17	FW	(Finland)	34	Lassi Lappalainen	0	1	0	1
TOTALS					78	24	5	107

=== Disciplinary record ===
Number	Nation	Position	Name	Veikkausliiga		Finnish Cup		Europa League		Total	
Number	Nation	Position	Name	Yellow card	Red card	Yellow card	Red card	Yellow card	Red card	Yellow card	Red card
4	(Finland)	DF	Hannu Patronen	2	0	0	0	0	1	2	1
6	(Finland)	DF	Juha Pirinen	1	1	1	0	0	0	2	1
7	(Finland)	MF	Moshtagh Yaghoubi	9	1	0	0	0	0	9	1
8	(Brazil)	DF	Rafinha	6	0	1	0	0	0	7	0
10	(Japan)	MF	Atomu Tanaka	1	0	2	0	0	0	3	0
11	(Colombia)	FW	Alfredo Morelos	3	0	1	0	0	0	4	0
14	(Finland)	MF	Sebastian Dahlström	1	0	1	0	0	0	2	0
15	(Finland)	DF	Ville Jalasto	1	0	1	0	1	0	3	0
16	(Finland)	DF	Aapo Halme	1	0	2	1	0	0	3	1
20	(Nigeria)	MF	Vincent Onovo	1	0	0	0	1	0	2	0
21	(Germany)	GK	Thomas Dähne	0	1	0	0	0	0	0	1
22	(Ghana)	MF	Anthony Annan	6	0	3	0	1	0	10	0
25	(Finland)	DF	Valtteri Vesiaho	0	0	2	0	0	0	2	0
27	(Slovenia)	MF	Filip Valenčič	1	0	0	0	0	0	1	0
31	(Finland)	FW	Akseli Pelvas	5	0	0	0	0	0	5	0
32	(Nigeria)	DF	Faith Friday Obilor	4	0	1	0	0	0	5	0
34	(Finland)	MF	Lassi Lappalainen	1	0	0	0	0	0	1	0
77	(Ghana)	FW	Evans Mensah	2	0	1	0	0	0	3	0
TOTALS				48	3	13	1	3	1	64	5
