= Demba Savage =

Gambian footballer (born 1988)

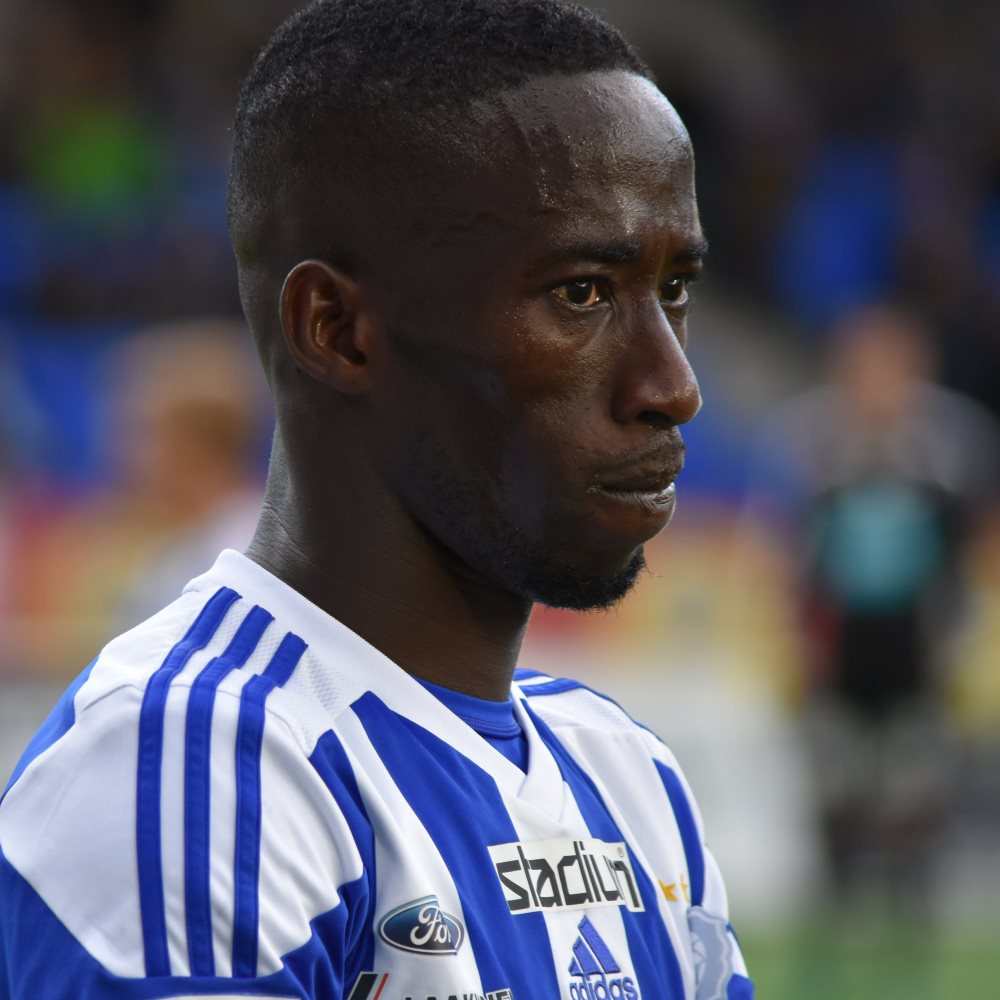

Personal information
- Date of birth: 17 June 1988 (age 38)
- Place of birth: Banjul, Gambia
- Height: 1.80 m (5 ft 11 in)
- Position: Winger

Youth career
- Warriors FC
- Rico FC

Senior career*
Years	Team	Apps	(Gls)
2003–2004	Gambia Ports Authority		(12)
2006–2008	KPV	32	(8)
2008–2012	Honka	74	(21)
2012−2015	HJK	107	(42)
2016	Häcken	19	(3)
2017−2018	HJK	24	(6)
2018	BB Erzurumspor	12	(2)
2018−2021	Honka	74	(10)
2022	TPS	20	(3)

International career
2008–2016	Gambia	15	(2)
- * Club domestic league appearances and goals as of 8 October 2022

Demba Savage (born 17 June 1988) is a Gambian professional footballer who plays as a midfielder. A right winger, who can also operate on the left wing or as a striker, he is mostly known for his blazing speed and dribbling skills.

== Career ==
=== Club ===
Savage started playing football on the streets of Banjul as a boy. In his school, Saint Mary's, he became a star player. After finishing secondary school, he played for Warriors FC and Rico FC. In the 2003–04 season, he played for Gambia Ports Authority and was the GFA League First Division top scorer with 12 goals.

In 2006, he signed for Finnish second tier club KPV. In his first season, he mostly played with KPV's reserve team, but in 2007, he took his place in the first team.

In August 2008, he was loaned to the Finnish Premier Division side FC Honka. Honka used its option for a permanent move after the season.

On 7 February 2012 the reigning Finnish champions, HJK, announced that they had signed Savage along with teammate Rasmus Schüller. Qualified for the Europa League group stages 2014 with HJK with a 5–4 aggregate victory over SK Rapid Wien.

On 28 October 2015, Savage signed for Swedish Allsvenskan side BK Häcken, following HJK teammate Rasmus Schüller who had signed for BK Häcken earlier in the month.

On 27 February 2017, Savage returned to HJK on a two-year contract.

On 1 April 2022, Savage joined TPS on a one-year deal.

=== International ===
In June 2008, Savage debuted in Gambia's national team in a World Cup qualification match against Liberia. He has also played in Gambia's youth national teams.

== Career statistics ==
=== Club ===
As of match played 19 December 2017

Appearances and goals by club, season and competition
Club	Season	League			National Cup		League Cup		Continental		Other		Total	
Club	Season	Division	Apps	Goals	Apps	Goals	Apps	Goals	Apps	Goals	Apps	Goals	Apps	Goals
HJK	2012	Veikkausliiga	30	12	0	0	5	0	5	0	—		40	12
HJK	2013	Veikkausliiga	28	11	2	0	6	4	2	1	—		38	16
HJK	2014	Veikkausliiga	24	11	3	0	3	0	10	3	—		40	14
HJK	2015	Veikkausliiga	25	8	1	2	1	0	3	0	—		30	10
HJK	Total		107	42	6	2	15	4	20	4	—		148	52
Häcken	2016	Allsvenskan	19	3	5	4	—		2	0	—		26	7
HJK	2017	Veikkausliiga	24	6	4	0	—		4	0	—		32	6
BB Erzurumspor	2017–18	1. Lig	12	2	—		—		—		—		2	
Honka	2018	Veikkausliiga	12	1	—		—		—		—		12	1
Honka	2019	Veikkausliiga	27	4	2	0	—		—		—		29	4
Honka	2020	Veikkausliiga	20	2	5	1	—		—		—		25	3
Honka	2021	Veikkausliiga	15	3	3	0	—		2 (Note: Appearances in UEFA Conference League)	0	—		20	3
Honka	Total		84	10	10	1	0	0	2	0	0	0	96	11
TPS	2022	Ykkönen	20	3	1	0	—		—		—		21	3
Career total			266	66	26	7	15	4	28	4	—		335	81

== Honours ==
Individual

- Veikkausliiga Best Forward: 2014
