= Rasmus Schüller =

Finnish footballer (born 1991)

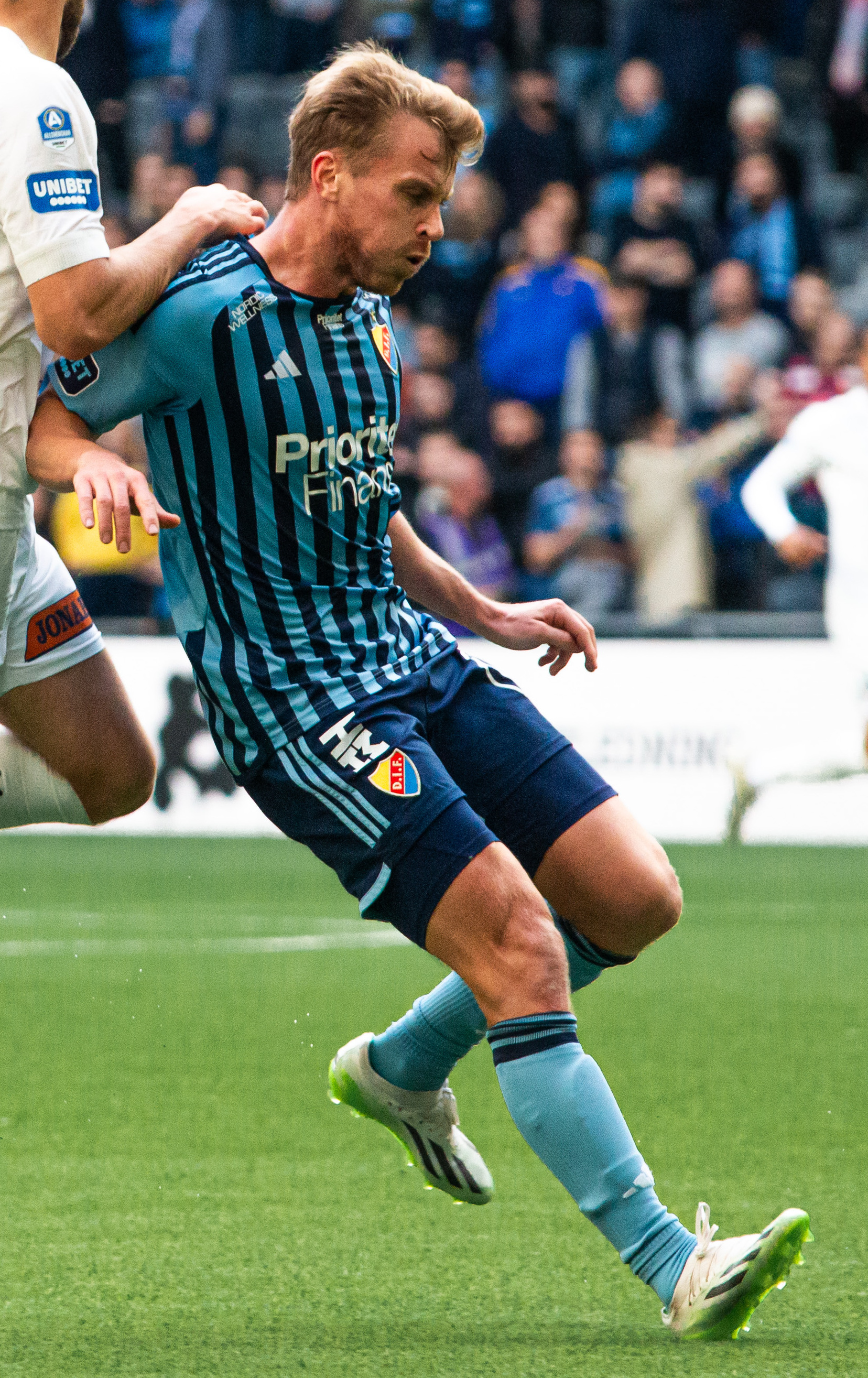
- Schüller with Djurgården in 2023

Personal information
- Full name: Rasmus Vilhelm Schüller
- Date of birth: 18 June 1991 (age 35)
- Place of birth: Espoo, Finland
- Height: 1.83 m (6 ft 0 in)
- Position: Midfielder

Team information
- Current team: Vendsyssel
- Number: 8

Youth career
- FC Kasiysi
- HooGee

Senior career*
Years	Team	Apps	(Gls)
2008–2011	Honka	63	(5)
2012–2015	HJK	88	(10)
2016	Häcken	18	(1)
2017–2019	Minnesota United	53	(1)
2017	→ HJK (loan)	7	(0)
2020	HJK	17	(3)
2021–2025	Djurgården	104	(2)
2026–	Vendsyssel	15	(0)

International career^{‡}
- Finland U19
2010–2012	Finland U21	13	(0)
2013–2025	Finland	79	(0)
- * Club domestic league appearances and goals as of 18 June 2026 ‡ National team caps and goals as of 29 October 2025

Rasmus Vilhelm Schüller (born 18 June 1991) is a Finnish professional footballer who plays as a midfielder for Danish 2nd Division club Vendsyssel FF.

== Club career ==
=== Early career ===
Schüller began his career at FC Kasiysi, a club based in his hometown Espoo. Later he moved on to rivals HooGee.

=== FC Honka ===
Schüller made his debut in an FC Honka jersey during the 2008 Finnish League Cup. He played in his first Premier Division match in August 2008 against RoPS. In December 2008, Schüller signed a contract with Honka that would have kept him in Espoo until the end of the 2011 season.

Schüller scored his first league goal for FC Honka in June 2009, less than a week after his 18th birthday, when his team came out victorious from a match against Kuopion Palloseura. Schüller scored on his debut in European club competitions, netting his team's second goal of the game when FC Honka beat Welsh side Bangor City FC in the Europa League on 16 July 2009. In August 2009, Schüller scored his second league goal for FC Honka and was named man of the match when he helped his team to a 3–1 victory over Tampere United.

On 22 September 2009, it was announced that Schüller had put pen to paper for a new deal until the end of the 2012 season.

=== HJK ===
In February 2012, HJK announced the signing of Schüller from FC Honka, along with teammate Demba Savage, for a fee of €200,000. Qualified for the Europa League group stages 2014 with HJK with a 5–4 aggregate victory over SK Rapid Wien.

=== BK Häcken ===
On 7 October 2015, Schüller agreed to transfer to Swedish Allsvenskan side BK Häcken for the 2016 season. Schüller was then joined at BK Häcken by HJK teammate Demba Savage on 28 October 2015.

=== Minnesota United ===
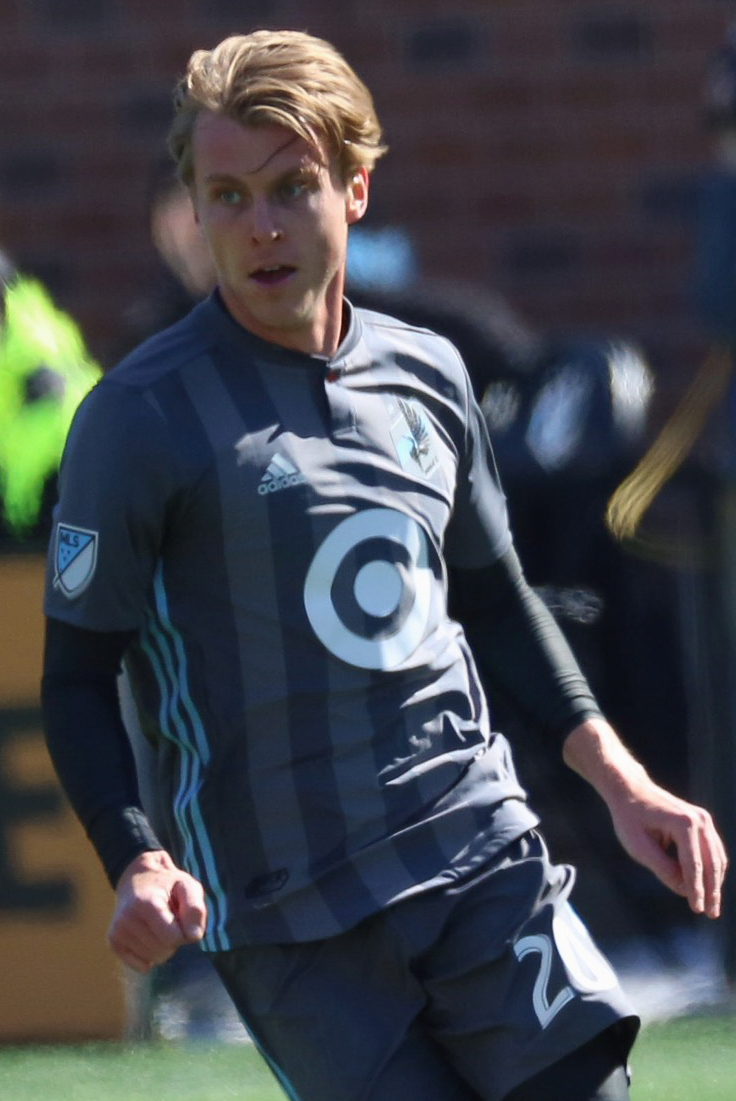
Schüller with Minnesota in 2018

On 24 January 2017, Schüller signed with Minnesota United, for a reported fee of $750,000.

Schüller was released by Minnesota at the end of their 2019 season.

=== Return to HJK ===
On 9 August 2017, Schüller rejoined HJK on a loan deal until the end of the season.

After his contract expired with Minnesota in the end of 2019, he signed a permanent deal with HJK.

=== Djurgården ===
In the end of 2020, Schüller returned to Allsvenskan and joined Djurgården. The transfer fee was not disclosed, but it was accordingly to the clause in his contract with HJK, concerning any transfer abroad.

On 8 January 2022, Schüller extended his contract with the club on a new deal until the end of 2025. On 1 April 2024, in the opening game of the 2024 season, Schüller suffered a surgery-requiring foot injury by a tackle by Kolbeinn Þórðarson, and was estimated to be sidelined for months. On 25 July, he made his first appearance after recovering from the injury, in a 3–0 UEFA Conference League qualifying win against Progrès Niederkorn.

=== Vendsyssel FF ===
Schüller joined Vendsyssel FF in January 2026 on a 1,5 year long contract.

On 29 January 2026, Danish 2nd Division club Vendsyssel FF signed Schüller on a contract until June 2027. The move was influenced by personal circumstances, as his partner, Sara Olai, had joined Fortuna Hjørring ahead of the spring season.

== International career ==
Schüller was a member of the Finnish U21 national team.

Schüller was called up for the UEFA Euro 2020 pre-tournament friendly match against Sweden on 29 May 2021.

He was one of the captains of the national team.

In October 2025, Schüller announced his retirement from international duty.

== Personal life ==
Schüller is a Swedish-speaking Finn with German ancestry. Schüller studies law at University of Helsinki. He is in a relationship with Swedish footballer Sara Olai.

== Career statistics ==
=== Club ===
As of 16 December 2024

Club	Season	League			Cup (Note: Appearances in the Finnish Cup, Swedish Cup, and U.S. Open Cup.)		Europe		Other		Total	
Club	Season	Division	Apps	Goals	Apps	Goals	Apps	Goals	Apps	Goals	Apps	Goals
Honka	2008	Veikkausliiga	3	0	2	0	—		1 (Note: Appearances in the Finnish League Cup.)	0	6	0
Honka	2009	Veikkausliiga	19	2	2	0	3 (Note: Appearances in the UEFA Cup/Europa League.)	1	4	0	28	3
Honka	2010	Veikkausliiga	19	3	1	0	2	0			21	3
Honka	2011	Veikkausliiga	22	0	0	0	4	0			26	0
Honka	Totals		63	5	5	0	9	1	4	0	81	6
HJK	2012	Veikkausliiga	25	2	2	0	6 (Note: Appearances in the UEFA Champions League and UEFA Europa League.)	3	5	0	38	5
HJK	2013	Veikkausliiga	24	7	2	1	2 (Note: Appearances in the UEFA Champions League.)	0	6	0	34	1
HJK	2014	Veikkausliiga	11	1	2	0	7	0	4	0	24	1
HJK	2015	Veikkausliiga	29	0	1	0	6	0	5	0	41	0
HJK	Totals		88	10	6	1	21	3	20	0	135	14
Häcken	2016	Allsvenskan	18	1	2	0	2 (Note: Appearances in UEFA Europa League)	0	—		22	1
Minnesota United	2017	MLS	7	0	1	0	—		—		8	0
Minnesota United	2018	MLS	31	1	1	0	—		—		32	0
Minnesota United	2019	MLS	15	0	0	0	—		—		15	0
Minnesota United	Totals		53	1	2	0	0	0	0	0	55	0
HJK (loan)	2017	Veikkausliiga	7	0	1	0	—		—		8	0
HJK	2020	Veikkausliiga	17	3	9	1	—		—		26	4
Djurgården	2021	Allsvenskan	26	0	3	0	—		—		29	0
Djurgården	2022	Allsvenskan	23	1	3	0	11 (Note: Appearances in UEFA Europa Conference League)	0	—		47	1
Djurgården	2023	Allsvenskan	23	1	5	0	2	0	—		30	1
Djurgården	2024	Allsvenskan	14	0	4	1	9	0	—		27	1
Djurgården	Total		86	2	15	1	22	0	0	0	123	3
Career totals			332	20	40	3	54	4	20	0	452	29

=== International ===
As of match played 13 October 2024

Finland
Year	Apps	Goals
2013	7	0
2014	2	0
2015	4	0
2016	8	0
2017	5	0
2018	6	0
2019	8	0
2020	5	0
2021	12	0
2022	7	0
2023	9	0
2024	6	0
Total	79	0

== Honours ==
Djurgårdens IF

- Allsvenskan runner-up: 2022
- Svenska Cupen runner-up: 2023–24

HJK

- Veikkausliiga: 2012, 2013, 2014, 2017, 2020
- Finnish Cup: 2014, 2017, 2020
- Finnish League Cup: 2015

BK Häcken

- Svenska Cupen: 2015–16

Individual

- Veikkausliiga Player of the Month: October 2012, May 2014
