= Tuomas Latikka =

Finnish footballer (born 1985)

Personal information
- Date of birth: 20 September 1985 (age 41)
- Place of birth: Jyväskylä, Finland
- Height: 1.74 m (5 ft 8 1/2 in)
- Position: Defender

Senior career*
| Years | Team | Apps | (Gls) |
| 2007–2014 | JJK | 124 | (4) |
| 2015–2017 | Apollo | | |
- * Club domestic league appearances and goals

Tuomas Latikka (born 20 September 1985) is a Finnish former football player.
