= Radoš Bulatović =

Serbian footballer

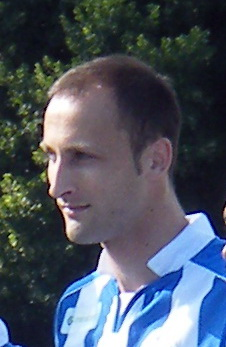
- Bulatović with Zalaegerszeg in July 2011

Personal information
- Full name: Radoš Bulatović
- Date of birth: 5 June 1984 (age 42)
- Place of birth: Titov Vrbas, SFR Yugoslavia
- Height: 1.96 m (6 ft 5 in)
- Position: Centre-back

Senior career*
Years	Team	Apps	(Gls)
2002–2003	Crvenka	15	(2)
2004–2008	Hajduk Kula	83	(3)
2008	→ Mladost Apatin (loan)	12	(0)
2009–2010	Sevojno	46	(4)
2010–2011	Sloboda Užice	26	(0)
2011	Zalaegerszeg	10	(0)
2012	Novi Pazar	12	(0)
2012	Hajduk Kula	13	(0)
2013	HJK	0	(0)
2013	Novi Pazar	11	(2)
2013–2014	Radnički Niš	22	(3)
2014	Dacia Chișinău	3	(0)
2015–2017	Radnički Niš	68	(4)
2017	Radnik Surdulica	11	(0)
2018	Radnički Niš	6	(0)
2018–2019	Crvenka		
2019–2020	Bratstvo Prigrevica		

International career
2004	Serbia and Montenegro U21	2	(0)
- * Club domestic league appearances and goals as of 12 February 2020

Radoš Bulatović (Serbian Cyrillic: Радош Булатовић; born 5 June 1984) is a Serbian retired footballer who played as a defender.

== Club career ==
Born in Titov Vrbas, Bulatović started out at Crvenka in the Serbian League Vojvodina, before switching to First League of Serbia and Montenegro club Hajduk Kula in the 2004 winter transfer window. He made 83 appearances and scored three goals in the top flight (including Serbian SuperLiga), helping the side qualify for UEFA competitions on two occasions. In early 2008, Bulatović was loaned out to Mladost Apatin. He joined fellow Serbian First League club Sevojno a year later, helping them reach the 2008–09 Serbian Cup final, but eventually lost to Partizan.

In June 2011, Bulatović moved abroad to Hungary and signed with Zalaegerszeg. He quickly returned to Serbia to play for Novi Pazar. In early 2013, Bulatović moved abroad for the second time and played briefly with Finnish champions HJK.

== International career ==
Bulatović represented Serbia and Montenegro at under-21 level, recording two appearances in 2004.

== Career statistics ==
Club	Season	League		National Cup		League Cup		Continental		Total	
Club	Season	Apps	Goals	Apps	Goals	Apps	Goals	Apps	Goals	Apps	Goals
Hajduk Kula	2003–04	13	2	0	0	—		—		13	2
Hajduk Kula	2004–05	20	0			—		—		20	0
Hajduk Kula	2005–06	18	1			—		—		18	1
Hajduk Kula	2006–07	20	0			—		1	0	21	0
Hajduk Kula	2007–08	12	0			—		4	0	16	0
Hajduk Kula	Total	83	3	0	0	—		5	0	88	3
Mladost Apatin (loan)	2007–08	12	0	0	0	—		—		12	0
Sevojno	2008–09	15	2			—		—		15	2
Sevojno	2009–10	31	2			—		4	0	35	2
Sevojno	Total	46	4			—		4	0	50	4
Sloboda Užice	2010–11	26	0	4	0	—		—		30	0
Zalaegerszeg	2011–12	10	0	0	0	2	0	—		12	0
Novi Pazar	2011–12	12	0	0	0	—		—		12	0
Hajduk Kula	2012–13	13	0	1	0	—		—		14	0
HJK	2013	0	0	0	0	1	0	—		1	0
Novi Pazar	2012–13	11	2	0	0	—		—		11	2
Radnički Niš	2013–14	22	3	1	0	—		—		23	3
Dacia Chișinău	2014–15	3	0			—		—		3	0
Radnički Niš	2014–15	13	1	0	0	—		—		13	1
Radnički Niš	2015–16	32	2	1	0	—		—		33	2
Radnički Niš	2016–17	23	1	1	0	—		—		24	1
Radnički Niš	Total	68	4	2	0	—		—		70	4
Radnik Surdulica	2017–18	11	0	0	0	—		—		11	0
Radnički Niš	2017–18	6	0	0	0	—		—		6	0
Career total		323	16	8	0	3	0	9	0	343	16

== Honours ==
Sevojno

- Serbian Cup: Runner-up 2008–09
