= Sakari Mattila =

Finnish footballer (born 1989)

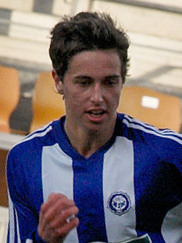
- Sakari Mattila in 2007

Personal information
- Full name: Sakari Mikael Mattila
- Date of birth: 14 July 1989 (age 37)
- Place of birth: Tampere, Finland
- Height: 1.87 m (6 ft 2 in)
- Positions: Centre back; defensive midfielder

Youth career
- Malminkartanon Peto
- POHU
- 2001–2008: HJK Helsinki

Senior career*
Years	Team	Apps	(Gls)
2007	Klubi 04	20	(1)
2008	HJK Helsinki	19	(4)
2009–2011	Udinese	0	(0)
2009–2010	→ Ascoli (loan)	11	(0)
2010–2011	→ Bellinzona (loan)	25	(1)
2011–2012	Bellinzona	17	(2)
2012	→ HJK Helsinki (loan)	11	(0)
2013	HJK Helsinki	20	(5)
2014–2015	Aalesund	37	(8)
2015–2016	Fulham	6	(0)
2016–2018	SønderjyskE	18	(1)
2018–2019	Fredrikstad	5	(0)
2020–2022	HIFK	59	(6)
2023-2025	Gilla FC	7	(1)

International career
2004	Finland U15	2	(0)
2005	Finland U16	1	(0)
2006	Finland U17	2	(1)
2007	Finland U18	14	(2)
2008	Finland U19	3	(0)
2008	Finland U20	2	(0)
2009–2010	Finland U21	9	(0)
2014–2017	Finland	16	(0)
Medal record
HJK Helsinki
First place	Finnish Cup	2008
First place	Veikkausliiga	2012
First place	Veikkausliiga	2013
Bellinzona
Third place	Swiss Challenge League	2012
Fredrikstad
Second place	2. divisjon	2018
- * Club domestic league appearances and goals

Sakari Mattila (born 14 July 1989) is a Finnish former professional footballer who played as a defender. Mattila was born in Tampere, but began his senior club career in Helsinki playing for Klubi-04, before making his league debut for HJK at age 18 in 2008.

Mattila was the captain of the Finnish under-19 national team and made his international senior level debut for Finland in March 2014, at the age of 24 and has since appeared in 2016 UEFA European Championship qualifications and 2018 FIFA World Cup qualifications.

== Early life ==
Mattila was born in Tampere, Finland, to a Finnish mother and Algerian father.

== Club career ==
=== HJK Helsinki ===
Before the season 2008, HJK was on a training camp in Marbella and Mattila was spotted by scouts of Sevilla FC and Málaga CF. He was playing on schoolboy terms, but HJK managed to sign a three-year contract with him.

In August 2008, Serie A club Palermo called him up for a week-long trial after scouting him in Helsinki. Just a week after his visit to Palermo, Udinese Calcio called him up for a week-long trial. Before leaving to Udine, Mattila stated that he is ready for a move to Italy. In October, Iltasanomat told that Udinese had made an offer, but HJK rejected the first bid. The asking price was said to be around 700.000 euros. After rumours about his move to Udinese, Mattila stated that he wants to make a career in Italy and was hoping for a move in the next transfer window.

=== Udinese Calcio ===
In November 2008, he signed a 4.5-year contract with Udinese and joined the club in January 2009. He played with the Primavera team and in July 2009 left on loan for Ascoli.

On 10 August 2010 he was loaned again. This time to AC Bellinzona, playing in the Swiss top level.

On 29 July 2012, it was announced that Mattila had joined his former club, HJK, on loan until end of December 2013.

=== Aalesunds FK ===
On 3 November 2013, it was announced that Mattila has signed a three-year contract with Aalesunds FK in Norway's Tippeligaen.

=== Fulham FC ===
On 4 August 2015 Mattila signed for Fulham FC for an undisclosed fee. On 8 August 2016 his contract was terminated by mutual consent.

=== Sønderjyske Elitesport ===
Two days after he terminated his contract with Fulham FC, Matilla signed for SønderjyskE. He signed a three-year contract. Mattila made his Superliga debut on 14 August 2016 in a match against Brøndby when on 64th minute he replaced Adama Guira as a substitute.

=== Fredrikstad ===
On 29 July 2018, Mattila signed a contract with Fredrikstad.

== International career ==
He made his debut for the Finland national team on 30 October 2013 in a friendly match in Qualcomm Stadium, San Diego against Mexico. Mattila earned his second cap for Finland on 5 March 2014, in the 2:1 away win over Hungary in a friendly match after coming on as a last minute substitute for Roman Eremenko. Mattila made his UEFA European Championship qualification match debut on 29 March 2015 on Windsor Park when Mixu Paatelainen chose him to the starting eleven for a match against Northern Ireland.

== Career statistics ==
=== Club ===
As of 7 July 2019

Appearances and goals by club, season and competition
Club	Season	League			National Cups		Europe		Total	
Club	Season	Division	Apps	Goals	Apps	Goals	Apps	Goals	Apps	Goals
Klubi 04	2007	Ykkönen	20	1	0	0	—		20	1
HJK	2009	Veikkausliiga	19	4	0	0	—		19	4
Udinese	2008–09	Serie A	0	0	0	0	—		0	0
Ascoli (loan)	2009–10	Serie B	11	0	1	0	—		12	0
Bellinzona	2010–11	Swiss Super League	25	1	2	0	—		27	1
Bellinzona	2011–12	Swiss Challenge League	17	2	1	0	—		18	2
Bellinzona	Total		42	3	3	0	—		45	3
HJK	2012	Veikkausliiga	10	0	0	0	1 (Note: Appearances in the Europa League)	0	11	0
HJK	2013	Veikkausliiga	20	5	0	0	2 (Note: Appearances in the Champions League)	0	22	5
HJK	Total		30	5	0	0	3	0	33	5
Aalesund	2014	Eliteserien	25	6	2	0	—		27	6
Aalesund	2015	Eliteserien	12	2	1	0	—		13	2
Aalesund	Total		37	8	3	0	—		40	8
Fulham	2015–16	Championship	6	0	3	0	—		9	0
SønderjyskE	2016–17	Danish Superliga	18	1	1	0	1	0	20	1
Fredrikstad	2018	2. divisjon	5	0	0	0	—		5	0
Fredrikstad	2019	2. divisjon	0	0	0	0	—		0	0
Fredrikstad	Total		5	0	0	0	—		5	0
Fredrikstad 2	2019	4. divisjon	9	1	—		—		9	1
HIFK	2020	Veikkausliiga	17	4	3	0	–		20	4
HIFK	2021	Veikkausliiga	21	1	3	0	–		24	1
HIFK	2022	Veikkausliiga	21	1	3	0	–		24	1
HIFK	Total		59	6	9	0	—		68	6
Career total			256	29	11	0	4	0	280	29

=== International ===
As of 28 March 2017

National team	Year	Competitive		Friendly		Total	
National team	Year	Apps	Goals	Apps	Goals	Apps	Goals
Finland	2013	0	0	1	0	1	0
Finland	2014	0	0	3	0	3	0
Finland	2015	5	0	1	0	6	0
Finland	2016	1	0	1	0	2	0
Finland	2017	1	0	3	0	4	0
Total		7	0	9	0	16	0

== Honours and achievements ==
=== Club ===
HJK Helsinki

- Veikkausliiga: 2012, 2013
- Finnish Cup: 2008
