= Mathias Kullström =

Finnish footballer (born 1987)

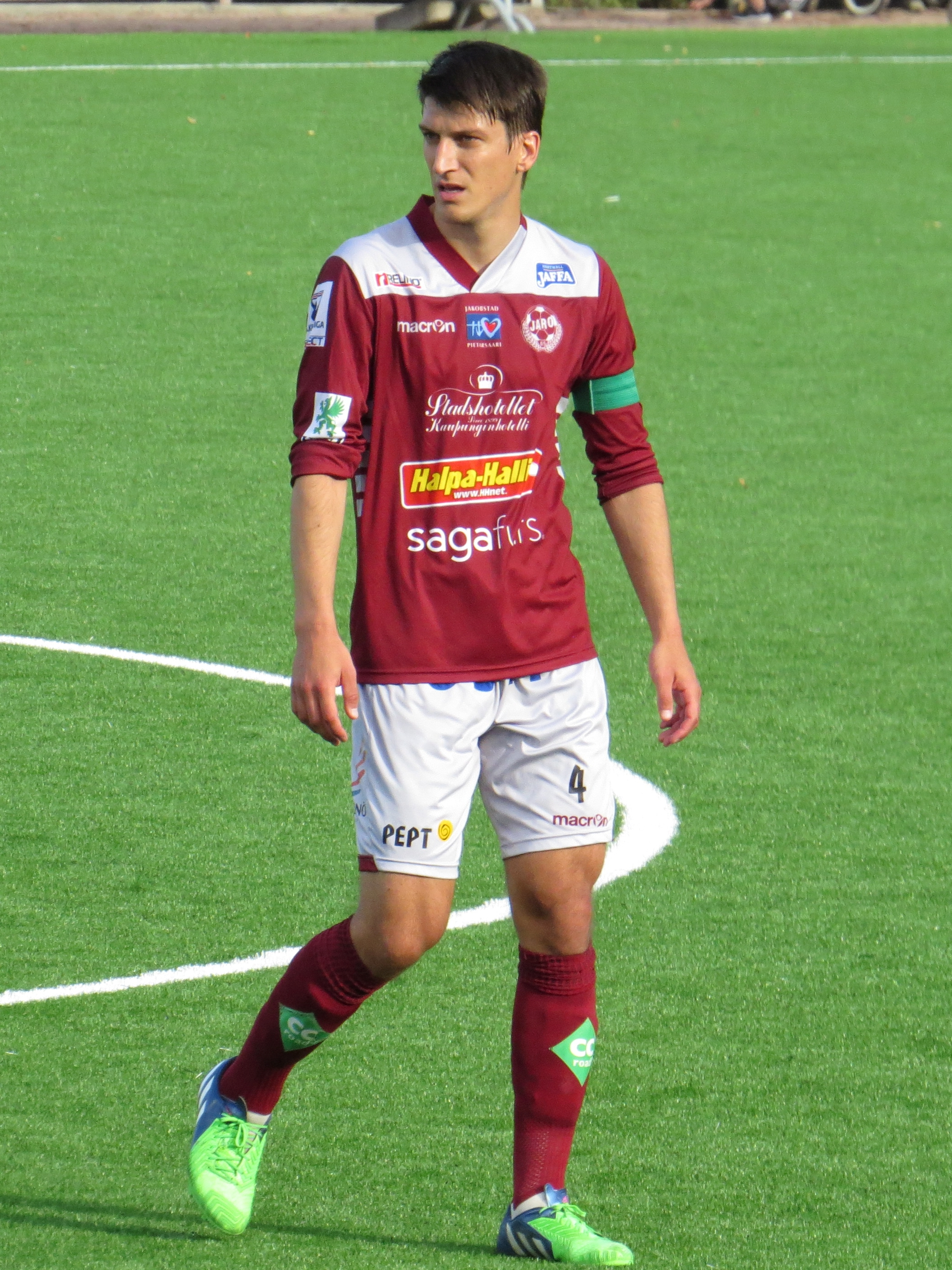
- Kullström in 2015

Personal information
- Date of birth: 2 February 1987 (age 39)
- Place of birth: Oravais, Finland
- Height: 1.87 m (6 ft 2 in)
- Position: Defender

Youth career
- 1998–2002: Norrvalla FF

Senior career*
Years	Team	Apps	(Gls)
2003	Norrvalla FF		
2004	JBK	15	(0)
2005–2006	VPS	16	(0)
2005	→ TP-Seinäjoki (loan)	4	(0)
2006	→ FC Kiisto (loan)	2	(0)
2007–2008	FF Jaro	45	(0)
2009	Norrvalla FF	19	(1)
2010	Macarthur Rams FC		
2011–2012	VIFK	49	(3)
2013–2015	FF Jaro	73	(2)

International career
2002	Finland U-15	3	(0)
2003	Finland U-16	6	(0)
2004	Finland U-17	7	(0)
2005	Finland U-18	1	(0)
2006	Finland U-19	3	(0)
- * Club domestic league appearances and goals as of 29 November 2015

Mathias Kullström (born 2 February 1987) is a Finnish footballer. He was born in Oravais.
