= Mikael Forssell =

Finnish footballer (born 1981)

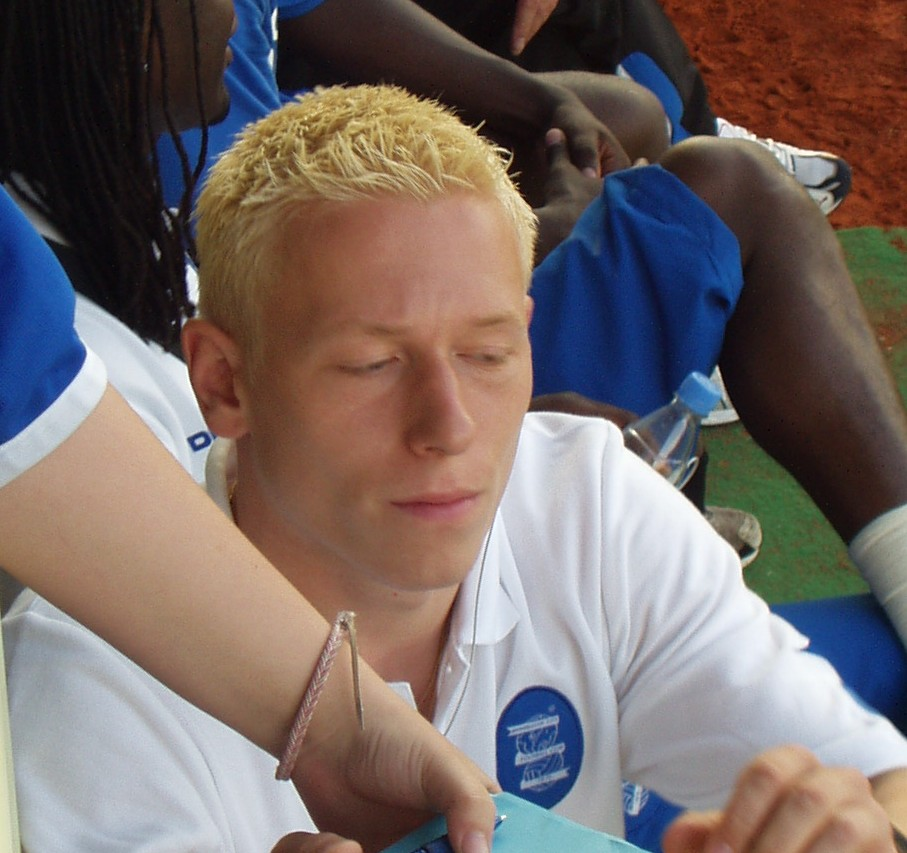
- Forssell during Birmingham City's pre-season tour, 2004

Personal information
- Full name: Mikael Kaj Forssell
- Date of birth: 15 March 1981 (age 45)
- Place of birth: Steinfurt, West Germany
- Height: 1.84 m (6 ft 0 in)
- Position: Striker

Team information
- Current team: HJK (assistant coach)

Youth career
- 1994–1997: HJK

Senior career*
Years	Team	Apps	(Gls)
1997–1998	HJK	17	(1)
1998–2005	Chelsea	33	(5)
2000	→ Crystal Palace (loan)	13	(3)
2000–2001	→ Crystal Palace (loan)	39	(13)
2003	→ Borussia Mönchengladbach (loan)	12	(7)
2003–2004	→ Birmingham City (loan)	32	(17)
2004–2005	→ Birmingham City (loan)	4	(0)
2005–2008	Birmingham City	65	(13)
2008–2011	Hannover 96	44	(7)
2011–2012	Leeds United	15	(0)
2012–2014	HJK	44	(21)
2014–2015	VfL Bochum	16	(3)
2016	HJK	19	(3)
2017	HIFK	25	(8)
Total		383	(101)

International career
1999–2014	Finland	87	(29)

Managerial career
- 2019–2021: HJK (youth)
- 2024–: HJK (assistant)
Medal record
HJK Helsinki
Winner	Finnish League Cup	1997
Winner	Veikkausliiga	1997
Winner	Finnish League Cup	1998
Winner	Finnish Cup	1998
Winner	Veikkausliiga	2013
Birmingham City
Runner-up	Football League Championship	2007
- * Club domestic league appearances and goals

Mikael Kaj Forssell (born 15 March 1981) is a Finnish former professional footballer who played as a striker. He is currently working as an assistant coach of HJK Helsinki, having previously worked as a youth coach for the club.

Forssell began his professional career in 1997 for HJK, having progressed through the team's youth teams, but he only remained at the club for a single season, making 17 league appearances, before he moved to England to join Chelsea in 1998. He never broke into the Chelsea team, making 33 league appearances in seven years, and spent two loan spells at Crystal Palace, one at Borussia Mönchengladbach, and two at Birmingham City. He switched permanently to the latter club in 2005, but injury problems restricted him to 65 league appearances in three seasons. He joined German side Hannover 96 in 2008 on a free transfer, but once again struggled with form and injury problems, and he left the club in 2011, having made 44 league appearances. This was followed by an unsuccessful season back in England, this time with Leeds United; 15 league games failed to yield a single goal. Forssell returned to HJK in October 2012.

Forssell made his full international debut for Finland in 1999, and was a regular player for his country for the next 15 years. He earned 87 caps for his country, and scored 29 goals, making him Finland's sixth most capped player and second highest goalscorer.

In 2022, Forssell was named in the HJK Hall of Fame.

== Club career ==
Born in Steinfurt, Germany, and considered one of the most talented Finnish footballers of all time, Forssell made his Veikkausliiga debut for HJK at the age of just 16.

=== Chelsea ===
His goal-scoring form for Finland's youth teams made him a target for a host of Europe's top clubs, and in 1998, the 17-year-old striker was snapped up by Chelsea who at the time were managed by Gianluca Vialli. He made his debut as a substitute in a league game against Arsenal in January 1999 and then three days later, Forssell made his first start for the club when he scored two goals against Oxford United in the FA Cup. His first league goal came three weeks later, when he scored against Nottingham Forest. However, when Chelsea signed Chris Sutton for £10 million, Forssell was loaned out twice to Crystal Palace of the then First Division, scoring 16 league goals in just over 50 appearances.

Forssell found it hard to find a place in the Chelsea first team with Gianfranco Zola, Jimmy Floyd Hasselbaink, Tore Andre Flo and Eiður Guðjohnsen, who were all ahead of him in the pecking order. After initially impressing new manager Claudio Ranieri, scoring in four consecutive games, he was sent out on loan again and had spells at Borussia Mönchengladbach of the German Bundesliga and twice to Birmingham City of the Premier League. Forssell scored seven Bundesliga goals for Mönchengladbach in the spring of 2003 and then 17 Premier League goals for Birmingham in the 2003–04 season (more league goals than any other Chelsea player), during which he was the division's fifth highest goalscorer. He was named Premier League Player of the Month for March 2004, a month in which he scored twice in a 4–1 win against Leeds United, and won Birmingham's Player of the Year award.

He returned to Birmingham on loan for the 2004–05 season, but suffered the second serious knee injury of his career. He returned to Chelsea to recuperate, and made occasional appearances for Chelsea that season, playing against Bayern Munich in the Champions League and in the last home match, against Charlton Athletic, as Chelsea celebrated winning their first top-flight title for 50 years.

=== Birmingham City ===
In the summer of 2005, Forssell joined Birmingham on a three-year deal for a fee of £3.5 million after Chelsea decided that he did not fit in their long-term plans. He struggled in the 2005–06 season, not having found his best form after his injury, and could not save Birmingham from relegation. Forssell suffered another cruel injury blow to his other knee during training in October 2006. This left him on the sidelines until he returned to training in February 2007 after undergoing operations on both knees. He remained at Birmingham to have another go at resurrecting his career.

His 2007–08 pre-season performances were good as he scored five goals in five games. His manager, Steve Bruce, was enthusiastic about his return to form. He continued his good form into the start of the season, scoring the opening goal of the match against Chelsea and consolidating his good form with two assists in the next three matches. He scored his first hat-trick at club level on 1 March 2008, in the 4–1 win over Tottenham Hotspur, a so-called "perfect hat-trick" – one goal scored with the left foot, one with the right, and one with the head. In his final season at Birmingham, he finished the season as their top scorer with nine goals as the club were relegated from the Premier League.

=== Hannover 96 ===
In May 2008, following the club's relegation from Premier League, Forssell signed a pre-contract agreement to join Hannover 96 on a free transfer when his Birmingham contract expired at the end of June. His contract with Hannover ran out at the end of the 2010–11 season.

On his pre-season debut for Hannover, he scored 10 goals including an eight-minute hat-trick in one friendly game against amateurs FC Boffzen. The game ended up as a 23–0 win.

=== Leeds United ===
After leaving Hannover when his contract expired at the end of the 2010–11 season, Forssell had trials with clubs including West Ham United and Leeds United of the English Football League Championship (second tier). On 8 September, he returned from international duty with Finland to sign a contract with Leeds until the end of the 2011–12 season. Forssell was handed the number 18 shirt and took his place on the bench two days later against his former club Crystal Palace. He came on as a second-half substitute to make his Leeds debut and assisted Ross McCormack for their winning goal in a 3–2 victory. He came on as a substitute against fierce rivals Manchester United in a 3–0 League Cup defeat.

After mainly being used as a substitute and failing to score a single goal for Leeds, Forssell was told by Neil Warnock that his one-year contract would not be renewed at the end of the 2011–12 season and that he would be released from the club at the expiry of his contract.

=== Return to HJK ===
On 29 October 2012, it was announced that Forssell would be returning to Finland after spending 14 years abroad, signing a two-year contract with his former club HJK. On 22 April 2013, Forssell opened the scoring by a header, in a 2–0 away win over rivals Honka. He finished the season with 14 league goals, the club's top goalscorer as HJK won their fifth consecutive championship.

After a stint with German side VfL Bochum, Forssell rejoined HJK on 3 March 2016.

=== HIFK and retirement ===
On 10 April 2017, Forssell signed a contract for one year with HIFK. He announced his retirement in May 2018.

== International career ==
Forssell was a regular for the Finnish national team for most of the 2000s. He played his first match for Finland on 9 June 1999 against Moldova, and scored his first goal on 28 February 2001 against Luxembourg. He often partnered Jari Litmanen. Forssell also played for Finland in the 2001 FIFA World Youth Championship.

Forssell scored twice against Germany in a 2002 World Cup qualifier; the match ended 2–2.

Forssell scored two hat-tricks for Finland. On 7 September 2005, in Tampere, he scored three goals against Macedonia in qualifying for the 2006 FIFA World Cup. On 17 November 2010, Forssell scored three of Finland's eight goals against San Marino in the Euro 2012 qualifying.

== Coaching career ==
After his playing career, Forssell has coached HJK's U19 youth team. On 6 June 2024, he was appointed an assistant coach of HJK first team.

== Personal life ==
Forssell's older sister, Christina Forssell, was also a footballer who played for HJK and Finland. His parents are Ansa and Bengt Forssell. Bengt has also played football on a high level in Finland. On 23 August 2013, Forssell got engaged to Metti Lukkarila, and they married on 9 August 2014. The couple have two children – Lilia, born in May 2014, and Lucas Mikael, born in August 2016.

== Career statistics ==
=== Club ===
Appearances and goals by club, season and competition
Club	Season	League			National cup (Note: Includes Finnish Cup, FA Cup, DFB-Pokal)		League cup (Note: Includes Finnish League Cup, Football League Cup / EFL Cup, Ligapokal)		Other		Total	
Club	Season	Division	Apps	Goals	Apps	Goals	Apps	Goals	Apps	Goals	Apps	Goals
HJK	1997	Veikkausliiga	1	0					0	0	1	0
HJK	1998	Veikkausliiga	16	1					4 (Note: Appearance(s) in UEFA Champions League)	0	20	1
HJK	Total		17	1					4	0	21	1
Chelsea	1998–99	Premier League	10	1	3	2	0	0	0	0	13	3
Chelsea	1999–2000	Premier League	0	0	0	0	1	0	1	0	2	0
Chelsea	2001–02	Premier League	22	4	6	3	4	2	3 (Note: Appearance(s) in UEFA Cup)	0	35	9
Chelsea	2002–03	Premier League	0	0	0	0	0	0	0	0	0	0
Chelsea	2003–04	Premier League	0	0	—		—		1	0	1	0
Chelsea	2004–05	Premier League	1	0	0	0	0	0	1	0	2	0
Chelsea	Total		33	5	9	5	5	2	6	0	53	12
Crystal Palace (loan)	1999–2000	First Division	13	3	0	0	0	0	—		13	3
Crystal Palace (loan)	2000–01	First Division	39	13	2	0	8	2	—		49	15
Crystal Palace (loan)	Total		52	16	2	0	8	2	0	0	62	18
Borussia Mönchengladbach (loan)	2002–03	Bundesliga	16	7	—		—		—		16	7
Birmingham City (loan)	2003–04	Premier League	32	17	4	2	1	0	—		37	19
Birmingham City (loan)	2004–05	Premier League	4	0	—		0	0	—		4	0
Birmingham City	2005–06	Premier League	27	3	5	3	3	2	—		35	8
Birmingham City	2006–07	Championship	8	1	0	0	2	0	—		10	1
Birmingham City	2007–08	Premier League	30	9	1	0	1	0	—		32	9
Birmingham City	Total		101	30	10	5	7	2	0	0	118	37
Hannover 96	2008–09	Bundesliga	30	7	1	0	—		—		31	7
Hannover 96	2009–10	Bundesliga	2	0	1	0	—		—		3	0
Hannover 96	2010–11	Bundesliga	12	0	1	0	—		—		13	0
Hannover 96	Total		44	7	3	0	0	0	0	0	47	7
Hannover 96 II	2009–10	Regionalliga Nord	1	0	—		—		—		1	0
Leeds United	2011–12	Championship	15	0	1	0	1	0	—		17	0
HJK	2013	Veikkausliiga	27	14	2	0	5	3	2	0	36	17
HJK	2014	Veikkausliiga	17	7	1	0	5	4	1	0	24	11
HJK	Total		44	21	3	0	10	7	3	0	60	28
VfL Bochum	2014–15	2. Bundesliga	16	3	1	0	—		—		17	3
HJK	2016	Veikkausliiga	19	3	4	2	0	0	1 (Note: Appearance in UEFA Europa League)	0	24	5
HIFK	2017	Veikkausliiga	26	8	0	0	—		2 (Note: Appearance in relegation play-off)	0	28	8
Career total			384	101	33	12	31	13	16	0	464	126

=== International ===
Appearances and goals by national team and year
National team	Year	Apps	Goals
Finland	1999	1	0
Finland	2000	7	0
Finland	2001	9	6
Finland	2002	2	1
Finland	2003	9	4
Finland	2004	3	1
Finland	2005	7	3
Finland	2006	6	1
Finland	2007	7	1
Finland	2008	8	1
Finland	2009	6	1
Finland	2010	7	5
Finland	2011	9	2
Finland	2012	0	0
Finland	2013	5	3
Finland	2014	1	0
Total		87	29

Scores and results list Finland's goal tally first, score column indicates score after each Forssell goal.

List of international goals scored by Mikael Forssell
No.	Date	Venue	Opponent	Score	Result	Competition
1	28 February 2001	Luxembourg, Luxembourg	Luxembourg		1–0	Friendly
2	2 June 2001	Helsinki, Finland	Germany		2–2	2002 FIFA World Cup qualification
3	2 June 2001	Helsinki, Finland	Germany		2–2	2002 FIFA World Cup qualification
4	15 August 2001	Helsinki, Finland	Belgium		4–1	Friendly
5	5 September 2001	Helsinki, Finland	Greece		5–1	2002 FIFA World Cup qualification
6	5 September 2001	Helsinki, Finland	Greece		5–1	2002 FIFA World Cup qualification
7	27 March 2002	Porto, Portugal	Portugal		4–1	Friendly
8	30 April 2003	Vantaa, Finland	Iceland		3–0	Friendly
9	7 June 2003	Helsinki, Finland	Serbia and Montenegro		3–0	UEFA Euro 2004 qualifying
10	10 September 2003	Cardiff, Wales	Wales		1–1	Euro 2004 qualifying
11	11 October 2003	Tampere, Finland	Canada		3–2	Friendly
12	8 September 2004	Jerevan, Armenia	Armenia		2–0	2006 FIFA World Cup qualification
13	7 September 2005	Tampere, Finland	Macedonia		5–1	2006 FIFA World Cup qualification
14	7 September 2005	Tampere, Finland	Macedonia		5–1	2006 FIFA World Cup qualification
15	7 September 2005	Tampere, Finland	Macedonia		5–1	2006 FIFA World Cup qualification
16	1 March 2006	Larnaka, Cyprus	Belarus		2–2	Friendly
17	17 November 2007	Helsinki, Finland	Azerbaijan		2–1	UEFA Euro 2008 qualifying
18	11 October 2008	Helsinki, Finland	Azerbaijan		1–0	2010 FIFA World Cup qualification
19	6 June 2009	Helsinki, Finland	Liechtenstein		2–1	2010 FIFA World Cup qualification
20	7 September 2010	Rotterdam, Netherlands	Netherlands		1–2	UEFA Euro 2012 qualifying
21	12 October 2010	Helsinki, Finland	Hungary		1–2	UEFA Euro 2012 qualifying
22	17 November 2010	Helsinki, Finland	San Marino		8–0	UEFA Euro 2012 qualifying
23	17 November 2010	Helsinki, Finland	San Marino		8–0	UEFA Euro 2012 qualifying
24	17 November 2010	Helsinki, Finland	San Marino		8–0	UEFA Euro 2012 qualifying
25	3 June 2011	Serravalle, San Marino	San Marino		1–0	UEFA Euro 2012 qualifying
26	2 September 2011	Helsinki, Finland	Moldova		4–1	UEFA Euro 2012 qualifying
27	23 January 2013	Chiang Mai, Thailand	Thailand		3–1	2013 King's Cup
28	23 January 2013	Chiang Mai, Thailand	Thailand		3–1	2013 King's Cup
29	26 March 2013	Luxembourg, Luxembourg	Luxembourg		3–0	Friendly

== Honours ==
HJK Helsinki

- Veikkausliiga: 1997, 2013
- Finnish Cup: 1998
- Finnish League Cup: 1998

Finland

- Nordic Football Championship: 2000–01

Individual

- Premier League Player of the Month: March 2004
