= Sebastian Sorsa =

Finnish footballer (born 1984)

Personal information
- Date of birth: 25 January 1984 (age 42)
- Place of birth: Helsinki, Finland
- Height: 1.75 m (5 ft 9 in)
- Positions: Defender; winger

Senior career*
| Years | Team | Apps | (Gls) |
| 2004–2008 | FCK Salamat | 20 | (4) |
| 2004–2008 | HJK | 85 | (5) |
| 2008 | Leeds United | 0 | (0) |
| 2008 | Hamilton Academical | 2 | (0) |
| 2009–2016 | HJK | 185 | (16) |
| 2017 | KuPS | 25 | (1) |
| Total | | 317 | (26) |

International career
| 2005 | Finland Under-21 | 1 | (0) |
| 2007 | Finland B | 3 | (1) |
| 2010–14 | Finland | 6 | (0) |
- * Club domestic league appearances and goals as of 11 June 2018

Sebastian "Seba" Sorsa (born 25 January 1984) is a Finnish former footballer.

== Career ==
Sorsa made his debut for HJK on 20 May 2004, coming on as a 65th-minute substitute for Ridvan Zeneli in a 0–0 draw against FC Haka. He scored his first goal for the club later that year in a 4–1 victory over Tampere United Sorsa won his first major trophy with HJK in 2006, assisting Farid Ghazi's 63rd-minute goal in a 1–0 win over KPV in the Finnish Cup final.

After a successful winter trial, Sorsa signed for Leeds United, joining on an 18-month contract in a Bosman transfer from Finnish side HJK Helsinki on 2 January 2008.

Sorsa failed to break into the Leeds first team, however, and he signed for newly promoted Scottish Premier League side Hamilton Academical in August 2008. He was released by Accies in January 2009. Sorsa joined Helsinki on 25 January 2009 on a free transfer.

Following his return to HJK from Hamilton Academical, Sorsa was part of the squad that won six consecutive Veikkausliiga titles between 2009 and 2014. During that span, he made 140 league appearances, contributing 15 goals and 30 assists. His most productive individual season came in 2009, when he recorded 6 goals and 12 assists in 25 league matches. In 2014, Sorsa featured in European competition as HJK reached the group stage of the 2014–15 UEFA Europa League after defeating Rapid Vienna 5–4 on aggregate in the play-off round. HJK finished third in Group B, with Sorsa playing the full 90 minutes in all six matches and serving as captain in three of them.

Sorsa made his final appearance for HJK on 23 October 2016 in a 0–0 draw against SJK. He concluded his HJK career with six Veikkausliiga titles, three Finnish Cups, and one Finnish League Cup. In total, he made 360 appearances for the club across all competitions, scoring 26 goals and providing 40 assists.

He used to be the captain of HJK.

On 11 November 2016 Sorsa signed with KuPS a two-year contract to cover seasons 2017 and 2018, however after the season 2017, he decided to finish his professional career.

After his retirement, Sorsa has also worked in a media staff of HJK Helsinki. In 2022, he was inducted to the HJK Hall of Fame.

== Honours ==
Individual

- Veikkausliiga Top assist provider: 2009

== International ==
Sorsa is a former Finnish under-21 international.

Sorsa debuted for the Finnish senior national team on January 18, 2010, coming on as a 60th-minute substitute for Jonatan Johansson in a 2–0 loss against South Korea. He earned 6 caps for Finland.
