= Xhevdet Gela =

Finnish footballer (born 1989)

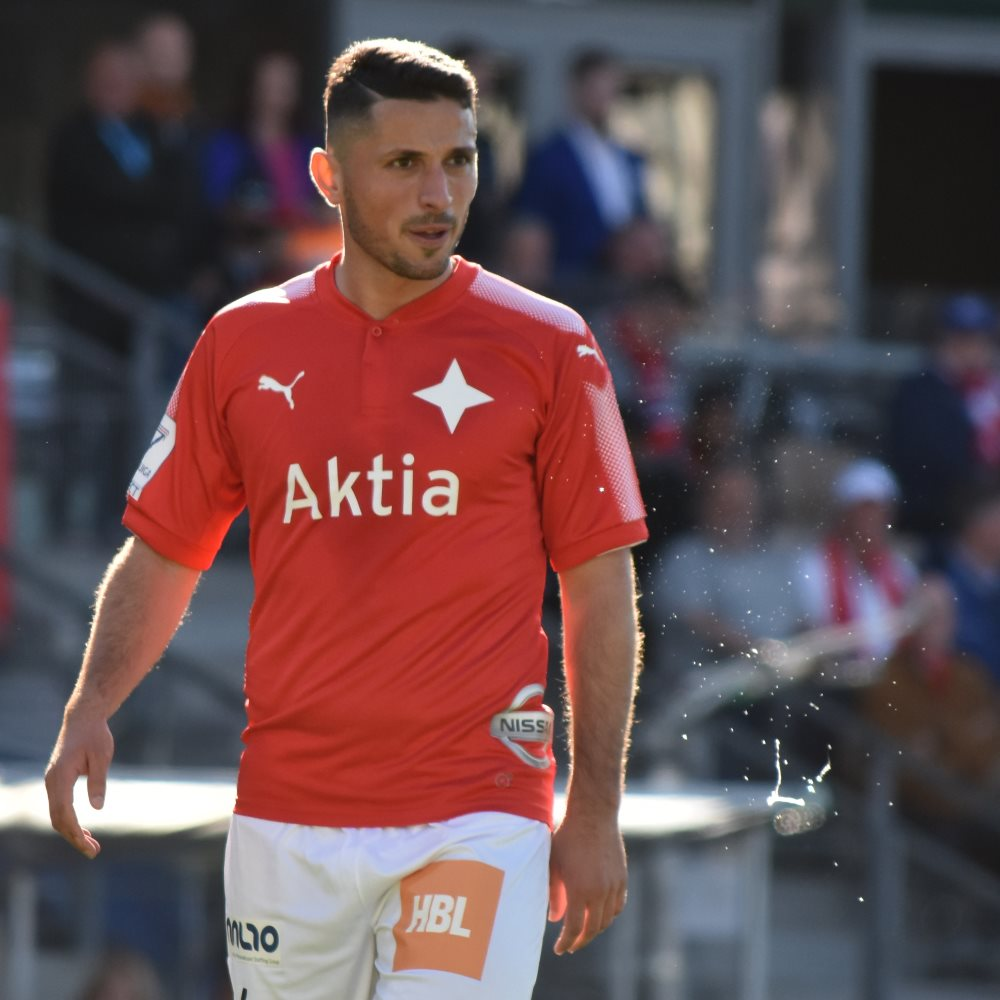
- Gela with HIFK in 2017

Personal information
- Date of birth: 14 November 1989 (age 36)
- Place of birth: Vučitrn, SFR Yugoslavia (present-day Kosovo)
- Height: 1.80 m (5 ft 11 in)
- Position: Midfielder

Team information
- Current team: PK-35
- Number: 10

Youth career
- KiuPa
- Honka
- Espoo
- AC Allianssi
- 2006: Atlantis

Senior career*
Years	Team	Apps	(Gls)
2007–2009	Atlantis	43	(6)
2010	Haka	21	(2)
2011	PK-35 Vantaa	22	(2)
2012–2013	MYPA	62	(5)
2014	Widzew Łódź	5	(0)
2014–2015	Lahti	36	(4)
2016–2017	HIFK	58	(4)
2018	Lahti	21	(0)
2019	HIFK	5	(0)
2020–2022	Ekenäs IF	68	(12)
2023–	PK-35	31	(2)

Managerial career
- 2019–2022: EBK
- * Club domestic league appearances and goals as of 1 September 2024

Xhevdet Gela (born 14 November 1989) is a Finnish footballer of Kosovar descent who plays for Ykkösliiga club PK-35. Besides Finland, he has played in Poland.

== Career ==
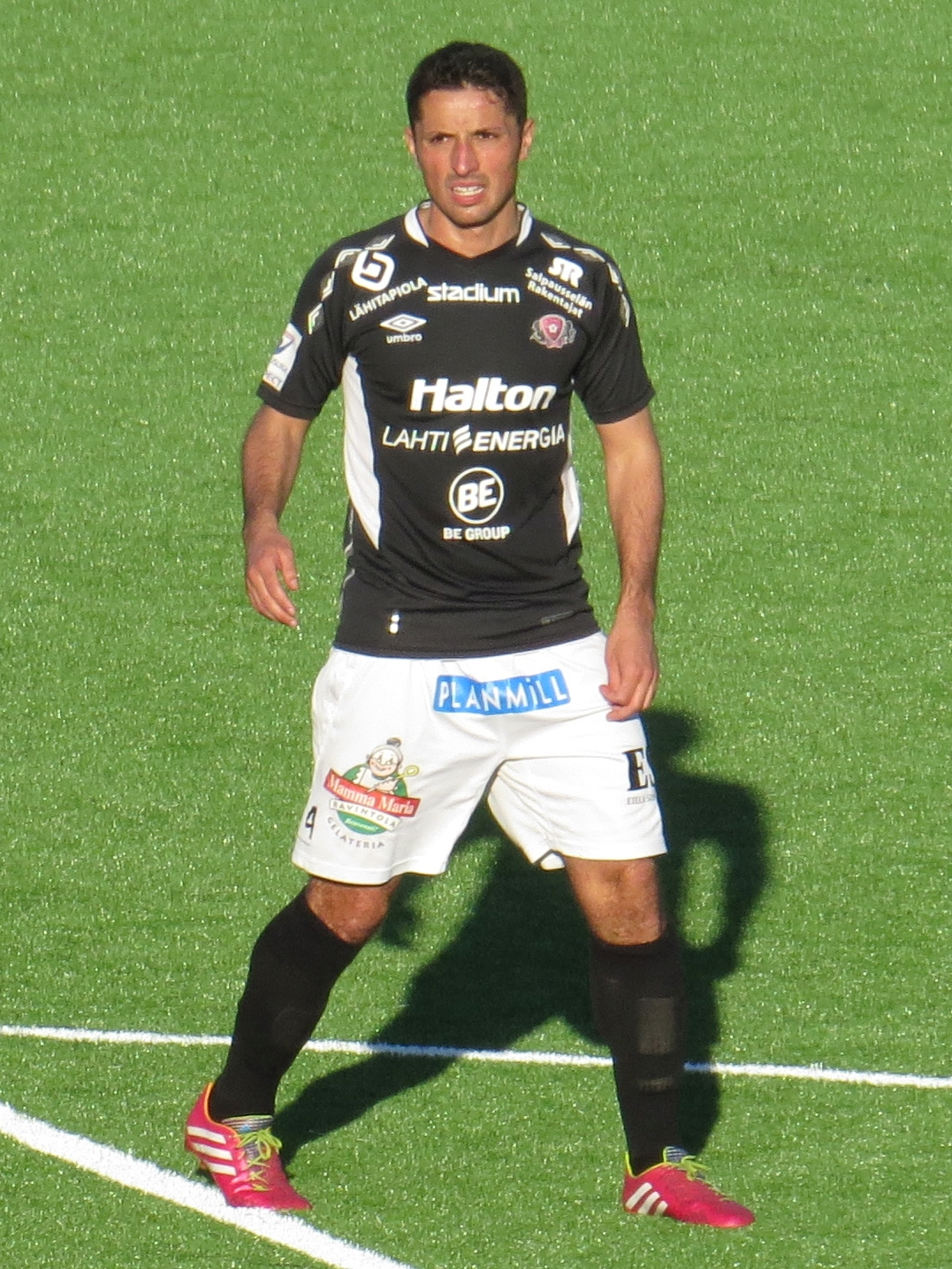
Gela with Lahti in 2015

Gela signed up with HIFK on 4 January 2019.

For the 2023 season, Gela returned to PK-35 in the third-tier Kakkonen.

Gela has also played futsal.

== Coaching career ==
While still playing, Gela worked also as a head coach of Esbo Bollklubb (EBK) in the fourth-tier Kolmonen between 2019 and 2022.

== Career statistics ==
As of 1 September 2024.

Appearances and goals by club, season and competition
Club	Season	League			Cup (Note: Includes Suomen Cup)		League cup (Note: Includes Finnish League Cup, Ykköscup and Ykkösliigacup)		Europe		Total	
Club	Season	Division	Apps	Goals	Apps	Goals	Apps	Goals	Apps	Goals	Apps	Goals
Atlantis	2007	Ykkönen	4	0	0	0	—		—		4	0
Atlantis	2008	Ykkönen	15	2	0	0	—		—		15	2
Atlantis	2009	Ykkönen	24	4	0	0	—		—		24	4
Atlantis	Total		43	6	0	0	0	0	0	0	43	6
Haka	2010	Veikkausliiga	21	2	1	0	1	0	—		23	2
PK-35 Vantaa	2011	Ykkönen	22	2	0	0	–		–		22	2
MyPa	2012	Veikkausliiga	30	1	4	0	6	0	3 (Note: Appearances in UEFA Europa League)	0	43	1
MyPa	2013	Veikkausliiga	32	4	1	0	7	1	—		40	5
MyPa	Total		62	5	5	0	13	1	3	0	43	6
Widzew Łódź	2013–14	Ekstraklasa	5	0	–		–		–		5	0
Lahti	2014	Veikkausliiga	9	1	—		—		—		9	1
Lahti	2015	Veikkausliiga	27	3	1	1	5	0	2	0	35	4
Lahti	Total		36	4	1	1	5	0	2	0	44	5
HIFK	2016	Veikkausliiga	27	0	1	0	5	0	—		33	0
HIFK	2017	Veikkausliiga	31	4	5	0	—		—		36	4
HIFK	Total		58	4	6	0	5	0	0	0	69	4
Lahti	2018	Veikkausliiga	21	0	6	1	—		2	0	29	1
HIFK	2019	Veikkausliiga	5	0	5	1	—		—		10	1
HIFK II	2019	Kolmonen	1	0	—		—		—		1	0
Ekenäs IF	2020	Ykkönen	20	5	2	0	—		—		22	5
Ekenäs IF	2021	Ykkönen	23	2	4	2	—		—		27	4
Ekenäs IF	2022	Ykkönen	25	5	2	0	4	1	—		31	6
Ekenäs IF	Total		68	12	8	2	4	1	0	0	80	15
PK-35	2023	Kakkonen	20	2	1	0	—		—		21	2
PK-35	2024	Ykkösliiga	11	0	3	0	2	0	—		16	0
PK-35	Total		31	2	4	0	2	0	0	0	37	2
Career total			373	37	36	5	30	2	7	0	446	44
