= Antti Hynynen =

Finnish footballer (born 1984)

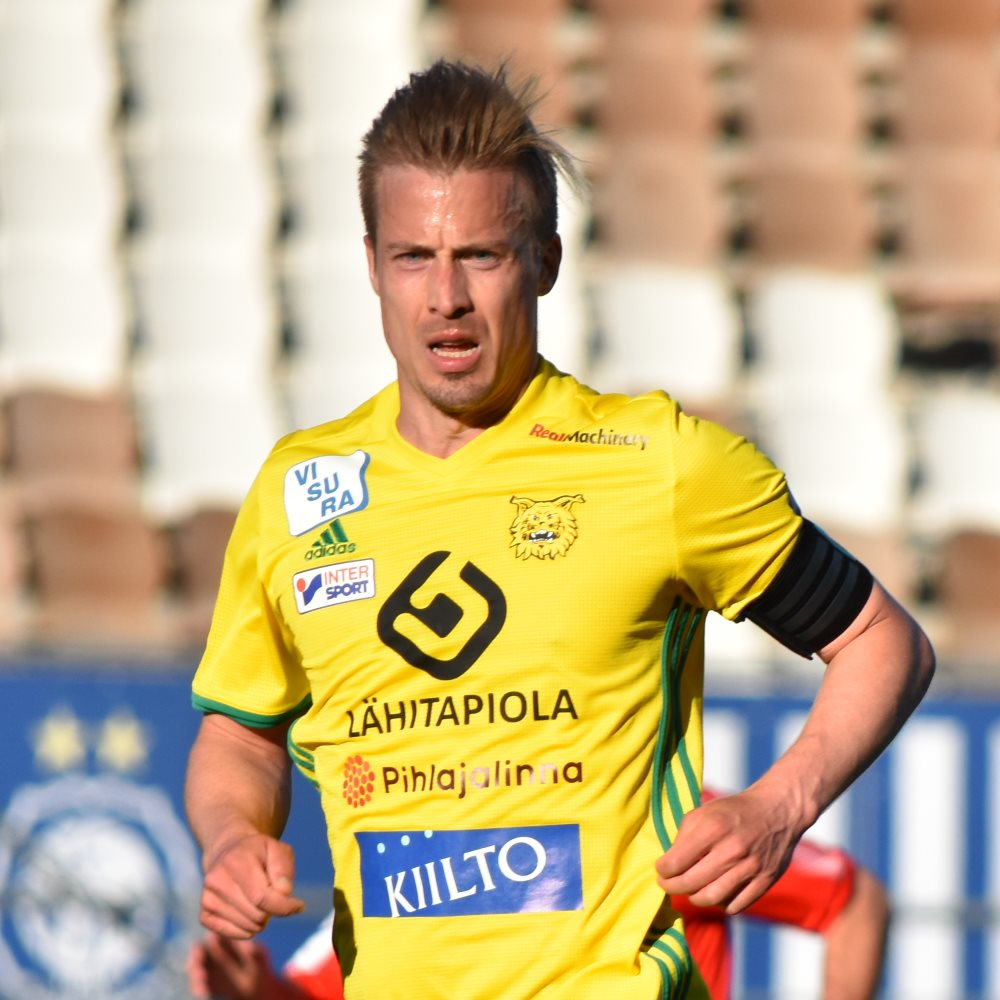

Personal information
- Date of birth: 30 May 1984 (age 42)
- Place of birth: Tampere, Finland
- Height: 1.80 m (5 ft 11 in)
- Positions: Midfielder; defender

Team information
- Current team: Ilves
- Number: 2

Senior career*
Years	Team	Apps	(Gls)
2003–2008	Tampere United	100	(13)
2008	KuPS	9	(3)
2009–2010	FC Haka	37	(11)
2010–2013	KuPS	86	(9)
2014–2017	Ilves	101	(6)

International career
2004–2006	Finland U21	3	(0)
- * Club domestic league appearances and goals

Antti Hynynen (born 30 May 1984) is a retired Finnish footballer. He last played for Finnish team Ilves of the Veikkausliiga and was the captain of the team.

Formerly known as forward or midfielder, he has played more regularly as a right back in last years. Hynynen is 5'11" tall and weighs 11 and a half stone.

He has previously played for Tampere United, FC Haka and KuPS. He also has a decent scoring record.
