= 2015 Finnish League Cup =

2015 Liigacup
Tournament details
- Country: Finland
- Dates: 20 January – 4 April 2015
- Teams: 12

Final positions
- Champions: HJK
- Runners-up: RoPS

Tournament statistics
- Matches played: 31
- Goals scored: 97 (3.13 per match)
- Top goal scorer: Akseli Pelvas (6)

The 2015 Finnish League Cup is the 19th season of the Finnish League Cup, Finland's second-most prestigious cup football tournament. SJK are the defending champions, having won their second league cup last year.

The cup consists of two stages. First there will be a group stage that involves the 12 Veikkausliiga teams divided into four groups. The top two teams from each group will enter the one-legged elimination rounds – quarter-finals, semi-finals and the final.

== Group A ==
| Pos | Team | Pld | W | D | L | GF | GA | GD | Pts | Qualification |
|---|---|---|---|---|---|---|---|---|---|---|
| 1 | HJK | 4 | 1 | 3 | 0 | 6 | 4 | +2 | 6 | Knockout stage |
| 2 | RoPS | 4 | 1 | 2 | 1 | 6 | 6 | 0 | 5 | Knockout stage |
| 3 | KTP | 4 | 0 | 3 | 1 | 4 | 6 | −2 | 3 | |

Updated to match(es) played on 25 February 2015. Source: veikkausliiga.com
Rules for classification: 1) points; 2) goal difference; 3) number of goals scored; 4) head-to-head points; 5) head-to-head goal difference; 6) goals scored in head-to-head

| 4 February 2015 Group stage | KTP | 0–0 | HJK | Kotka |
| 18:30 EET (UTC+02) | | Report | | Stadium: Ruonalan urheiluhalli Referee: Miikka Lähdesmäki |

| 13 February 2015 Group stage | RoPS | 0–2 | HJK | Oulu |
| 17:00 EET (UTC+02) | | Report | Lod 82'; Tanaka 90+2' | Stadium: Heinäpään halli Referee: Dennis Antamo |

| 17 February 2015 Group stage | HJK | 2–2 | RoPS | Helsinki |
| 16:00 EET (UTC+02) | Baah 68'; Zeneli 89' | Report | Obilor 15'; Saksela 20' | Stadium: Talin halli Referee: Mikko Mörö |

| 19 February 2015 Group stage | KTP | 2–2 | RoPS | Kotka |
| 15:00 EET (UTC+02) | Minkenen 35' (pen.), 73' | Report | Ibiyomi 4', 17' | Stadium: Ruonalan urheiluhalli Referee: Marko Grönholm |

| 22 February 2015 Group stage | HJK | 2–2 | KTP | Helsinki |
| 15:00 EET (UTC+02) | Jallow 45'; Zeneli 73' | Report | Minkenen 33' (pen.); Kaivonurmi 75' | Stadium: Talin halli Referee: Mattias Gestranius |

| 25 February 2015 Group stage | RoPS | 2–0 | KTP | Oulu |
| 18:00 EET (UTC+02) | Ibiyomi 11'; Roiha 41' | Report | | Stadium: Heinäpään halli Referee: Dennis Antamo |

== Group B ==
| Pos | Team | Pld | W | D | L | GF | GA | GD | Pts | Qualification |
|---|---|---|---|---|---|---|---|---|---|---|
| 1 | Ilves | 4 | 3 | 1 | 0 | 8 | 5 | +3 | 10 | Knockout stage |
| 2 | Lahti | 4 | 1 | 1 | 2 | 4 | 5 | −1 | 4 | Knockout stage |
| 3 | KuPS | 4 | 0 | 2 | 2 | 6 | 8 | −2 | 2 | |

Updated to match(es) played on 21 February 2015. Source: veikkausliiga.com
Rules for classification: 1) points; 2) goal difference; 3) number of goals scored; 4) head-to-head points; 5) head-to-head goal difference; 6) goals scored in head-to-head

| 23 January 2015 Group stage | KuPS | 1–2 | Ilves | Kuopio |
| 18:00 EET (UTC+02) | Trafford 9' | Report | Chidozie 4', 48' | Stadium: Kuopio-halli; Referee: Ville Nevalainen |

| 30 January 2015 Group stage | Lahti | 1–1 | KuPS | Lahti |
| 15:00 EET (UTC+02) | Ristola 30' | Report | Nissilä 36' | Stadium: Mukkulan halli Referee: Jari Järvinen |

| 3 February 2015 Group stage | Lahti | 0–1 | Ilves | Lahti |
| 17:00 EET (UTC+02) | | Report | Petrescu 86' | Stadium: Mukkulan halli Referee: Antti Munukka |

| 7 February 2015 Group stage | Ilves | 2–1 | Lahti | Tampere |
| 14:30 EET (UTC+02) | Hjelm 9'; Chidozie 57' | Report | Ristola 33' | Stadium: Pirkkahalli A Referee: Vesa Hätilä |

| 13 February 2015 Group stage | KuPS | 1–2 | Lahti | Kuopio |
| 17:00 EET (UTC+02) | Poutiainen 52' | Report | Sesay 57'; Ristola 90' | Stadium: Kuopio-halli; Referee: Antti Munukka |

| 21 February 2015 Group stage | Ilves | 3–3 | KuPS | Tampere |
| 13:30 EET (UTC+02) | Hjelm 34' (pen.), 77'; Petrescu 46' | Report | Pennanen 50'; Sirbiladze 69'; Omoijuanfo 90+1' | Stadium: Pirkkahalli A Referee: Petteri Kari |

== Group C ==
| Pos | Team | Pld | W | D | L | GF | GA | GD | Pts | Qualification |
|---|---|---|---|---|---|---|---|---|---|---|
| 1 | SJK | 2 | 2 | 0 | 0 | 5 | 0 | +5 | 6 | Knockout stage |
| 2 | VPS | 2 | 1 | 0 | 1 | 1 | 1 | 0 | 3 | Knockout stage |
| 3 | Jaro | 2 | 0 | 0 | 2 | 0 | 5 | −5 | 0 | |

Updated to match(es) played on 14 February 2015. Source: veikkausliiga.com
Rules for classification: 1) points; 2) goal difference; 3) number of goals scored; 4) head-to-head points; 5) head-to-head goal difference; 6) goals scored in head-to-head

| 7 February 2015 Group stage | Jaro | 0–1 | VPS | Jakobstad |
| 15:15 EET (UTC+02) | | Report | Koskimaa 77' | Stadium: Jakobstads Centralplan; Referee: Toni Pohjoismäki |

| 11 February 2015 Group stage | SJK | 1–0 | VPS | Seinäjoki |
| 18:30 EET (UTC+02) | Ngueukam 54' | Report | | Stadium: Wallsport Areena; Referee: Tommi Grönman |

| 14 February 2015 Group stage | SJK | 4–0 | Jaro | Seinäjoki |
| 14:15 EET (UTC+02) | Pelvas 42'; Sarajärvi 48'; Gogoua 82'; Matrone 87' | Report | | Stadium: Wallsport Areena; Referee: Jani Laaksonen |

| 18 February 2015 Group stage | VPS | 0–3 | SJK | Vaasa |
| 18:30 EET (UTC+02) | | Report | Vasara 28'; Pelvas 36', 56' | Stadium: Hietalahti Stadium; Referee: Petri Viljanen |

| 21 February 2015 Group stage | VPS | 2–1 | Jaro | Vaasa |
| 14:30 EET (UTC+02) | Seabrook 83', 90+1' | Report | Veteli 28' | Stadium: Hietalahti Stadium; Referee: Ville Nevalainen |

| 28 February 2015 Group stage | Jaro | 3–4 | SJK | Jakobstad |
| 15:15 EET (UTC+02) | S.Eremenko 16', 40'; J.Veteli 29' | Report | Atajić 8', 34'; Pelvas 51', 84' | Stadium: Jakobstads Centralplan; Attendance: 450; Referee: Mattias Gestranius |

== Group D ==
| Pos | Team | Pld | W | D | L | GF | GA | GD | Pts | Qualification |
|---|---|---|---|---|---|---|---|---|---|---|
| 1 | HIFK | 4 | 2 | 1 | 1 | 12 | 5 | +7 | 7 | Knockout stage |
| 2 | Inter Turku | 4 | 2 | 1 | 1 | 8 | 12 | −4 | 7 | Knockout stage |
| 3 | IFK | 4 | 0 | 2 | 2 | 6 | 9 | −3 | 2 | |

Updated to match(es) played on 7 February 2015. Source: veikkausliiga.com
Rules for classification: 1) points; 2) goal difference; 3) number of goals scored; 4) head-to-head points; 5) head-to-head goal difference; 6) goals scored in head-to-head

| 20 January 2015 Group stage | FC Inter | 3–2 | HIFK | Turku |
| 13:00 EET (UTC+02) | Ojala 3'; Hambo 47', 85' | Report | Halme 10'; Sinisalo 51' | Stadium: Javenture-Areena; Referee: Petteri Kari |

| 24 January 2015 Group stage | HIFK | 1–1 | IFK | Helsinki |
| 14:30 EET (UTC+02) | Peltonen 75' | Report | Orgill 79' | Stadium: Talin jalkapallohalli Referee: Dennis Antamo |

| 29 January 2015 Group stage | IFK | 1–2 | Inter Turku | Eckerö |
| 19:00 EET (UTC+02) | Orgill 59' | Report | Ojala 22'; Hambo 85' | Stadium: Eckerö Hallen; Referee: Petri Viljanen |

| 2 February 2015 Group stage | IFK | 1–3 | HIFK | Eckerö |
| 19:00 EET (UTC+02) | Orgill 47' | Report | Bäckman 32'; Mustonen 47'; Vesala 58' | Stadium: Eckerö Hallen; Referee: Marko Grönholm |

| 7 February 2015 Group stage | HIFK | 6–0 | Inter Turku | Helsinki |
| 17:30 EET (UTC+02) | Salmikivi 33'; Rahimi 45+1'; Ahonen 51'; Lassas 54'; Korhonen 63'; Anyamele 74' | Report | | Stadium: Talin jalkapallohalli Referee: Tero Nieminen |

| 13 February 2015 Group stage | Inter Turku | 3–3 | IFK | Turku |
| 14:00 EET (UTC+02) | Ojala 13'; Lehtonen 30'; Hambo 54' | Report | Sid 12'; Span 22'; Orgill 69' | Stadium: Javenture-Areena; Referee: Petri Viljanen |

== Knockout stage ==
=== Quarter-finals ===
| 6 March 2015 Quarterfinal 1 | HJK | 2–0 | FC Lahti | Helsinki |
| 16:00 EET (UTC+2) | Zeneli 38'; Havenaar 85' | Report | | Stadium: Tali Halli; Attendance: 702; Referee: Petteri Kari |

| 7 March 2015 Quarterfinal 2 | HIFK | 2–1 | VPS | Helsinki |
| 13:30 EET (UTC+2) | Korhonen 1', 57' | Report | Lähdesmäki 85' | Stadium: Tali Halli; Attendance: 565; Referee: Jari Järvinen |

| 7 March 2015 Quarterfinal 3 | SJK | 2–2 (3–4 p) | RoPS | Seinäjoki |
| 16:00 EET (UTC+2) | Pelvas 45+3'; Vasara 85' | Report | Posinković 9'; Saksela 46' | Stadium: Seinäjoen keskuskenttä Attendance: 497; Referee: Ville Nevalainen |
| | Penalties |
| | Brown (penalty missed); Pelvas (penalty scored); Atajić (penalty scored); Laaksonen (penalty missed); Gogoua (penalty scored) | | (penalty scored) Okkonen; (penalty scored) Mäkitalo; (penalty scored) Yaghoubi; (penalty missed) Posinković; (penalty scored) Pirinen |

| 8 March 2015 Quarterfinal 4 | Ilves | 1–1 (9–8 p) | Inter Turku | Helsinki |
| 19:15 EET (UTC+2) | Emenike 54' | Report | Hambo 18' | Stadium: Tali Halli; Attendance: 800; Referee: Antti Munukka |
| | Penalties |
| | Hynynen (penalty scored); Kujala (penalty scored); Zolameso (penalty scored); Mbachu (penalty scored); Hilander (penalty scored); Lahtinen (penalty scored); Malundama (penalty scored); Aho (penalty scored); Miettunen (penalty missed); Ojanperä (penalty scored) | | (penalty scored) Ojala; (penalty scored) Kanakoudis; (penalty scored) Hambo; (penalty scored) Lehtonen; (penalty scored) Kairinen; (penalty scored) Duah; (penalty scored) Belica; (penalty scored) Onovo; (penalty missed) Matoukou; (penalty missed) Diogo |

=== Semi-finals ===
| 14 March 2015 Semifinal 1 | HJK | 2–0 | HIFK | Helsinki |
| 14:00 EET (UTC+2) | Järvenpää 60'; Jama 90+4' | Report | | Stadium: Tali Halli; Attendance: 542; Referee: Tommi Grönman |

| 14 March 2015 Semifinal 2 | Ilves | 1–2 | RoPS | Tampere |
| 14:30 EET (UTC+2) | Chidozie 66' | Report | Posinković 16'; Saksela 48' | Stadium: Tammela Stadion; Attendance: 800; Referee: Vesa Hätilä |

=== Final ===
| 4 April 2015 Final | RoPS | 0 – 2 | HJK | Rovaniemi |
| 15:00 EEST (UTC+3) | | Report | Lod 9'; Havenaar 57' | Stadium: Keskuskenttä; Attendance: 907; Referee: Jari Järvinen |

== Scorers ==
6 goals:

- (Finland) Akseli Pelvas - SJK

5 goals:

- (Finland) Vahid Hambo - Inter Turku

4 goals:

- (Jamaica) Dever Orgill - IFK Mariehamn
- (Nigeria) Henry Chidozie - Ilves

3 goals:

- (Finland) Joni Korhonen - HIFK
- (Finland) Erfan Zeneli - HJK
- (Finland) Jonne Hjelm - Ilves
- (Finland) Mika Ojala - Inter Turku
- (Finland) Valeri Minkenen - KTP
- (Finland) Aleksi Ristola - Lahti
- (Finland) Adeniyi Michael Ibiyomi - RoPS
- (Finland) Janne Saksela - RoPS

2 goals:

- (Japan) Mike Havenaar - HJK
- (Finland) Robin Lod - HJK
- (Finland) Tomi Petrescu - Ilves
- (Finland) Sergei Eremenko - Jaro
- (Finland) Joona Veteli - Jaro
- (Bosnia and Herzegovina) Bahrudin Atajić - SJK
- (Finland) Jussi Vasara - SJK
- (United States) Jordan Seabrook - VPS

1 goals:

- (Finland) Jesse Ahonen - HIFK
- (Finland) Nnaemeka Anyamele - HIFK
- (Finland) Jani Bäckman - HIFK
- (Finland) Jukka Halme - HIFK
- (Finland) Fredrik Lassas - HIFK
- (Finland) Tuomas Mustonen - HIFK
- (Finland) Eero Peltonen - HIFK
- (Finland) Youness Rahimi - HIFK
- (Finland) Ville Salmikivi - HIFK
- (Finland) Jukka Sinisalo - HIFK
- (Finland) Tommi Vesala - HIFK
- (Ghana) Gideon Baah - HJK
- (The Gambia) Ousman Jallow - HJK
- (Finland) Omar Jama - HJK
- (Finland) Lassi Järvenpää - HJK
- (Japan) Atomu Tanaka - HJK
- (United States) Brian Span - IFK
- (Finland) Mbachu Uchenna Emenike - Ilves
- (Finland) Henri Lehtonen - Inter Turku
- (Nigeria) Faith Friday Obilor - Inter Turku
- (Finland) Robin Sid - Inter Turku
- (Finland) Samuli Kaivonurmi - KTP
- (Finland) Urho Nissilä - KuPS
- (Norway) Ohi Omoijuanfo - KuPS
- (Finland) Petteri Pennanen - KuPS
- (Finland) Patrick Poutiainen - KuPS
- (Georgia (country)) Irakli Sirbiladze - KuPS
- (Canada) Charlie Trafford - KuPS
- (Sierra Leone) Hassan Mila Sesay - Lahti
- (Finland) Antti Okkonen - RoPS
- (Finland) Vilim Posinković - RoPS
- (Finland) Simo Roiha - RoPS
- (Cameroon) Ariel Ngueukam - SJK
- (Finland) Jesse Sarajärvi - SJK
- (Ivory Coast) Cèdric Gogoua - SJK
- (Finland) Marco Matrone - SJK
- (Finland) Ville Koskimaa - VPS
- (Finland) Tuomas Lähdesmäki - VPS
