= 2015 HJK season =

HJK
2015 season
- Chairman: Olli-Pekka Lyytikäinen
- Manager: Mika Lehkosuo
- Stadium: Sonera Stadium
- Veikkausliiga: 3rd
- Finnish Cup: Semifinal
- League Cup: Champions
- UEFA Champions League: Third qualifying round
- UEFA Europa League: Play-off round
- Top goalscorer: League: Atomu Tanaka (8); Demba Savage (8); Erfan Zeneli (8); All: Erfan Zeneli (13)
- Highest home attendance: League: 10,521 (6 July 2015 vs HIFK, Veikkausliiga); Other:
- Lowest home attendance: League; 2,152 (29 April 2015 vs KTP, Veikkausliiga); Other:
- Average home league attendance: 5,281
Home colours	Away colours

The 2015 season was Helsingin Jalkapalloklubi's 107th competitive season. HJK is the most successful football club in Finland with 27 Finnish Championships, 12 Finnish Cup titles, 5 Finnish League Cup titles, one appearance in the UEFA Champions League group stages and one appearance in the UEFA Europa League group stages.

As Veikkausliiga 2014 champions, HJK entered the 2015–16 UEFA Champions League second qualifying round.

The Under-19 team, including several players from Klubi-04 participated in the 2015–16 UEFA Youth League.

== Squad ==
As of September 1, 2015. Source:

No.	Name	Nationality	Position	Date of birth (age)	Previous club
Goalkeepers
1	Daniel Örlund	(Sweden)	GK	23 June 1980 (aged 35)	(Norway) Rosenborg
21	Thomas Dähne	(Germany)	GK	4 January 1994 (aged 21)	(Germany) RB Leipzig
35	Saku-Pekka Sahlgren	(Finland)	GK	8 April 1992 (aged 23)	(Finland) RoPS
Defenders
3	Gideon Baah	(Ghana)	DF	1 October 1991 (aged 24)	(Finland) Honka
4	Juhani Ojala	(Finland)	DF	19 June 1989 (aged 26)	loan from (Russia) Terek Grozny
5	Tapio Heikkilä	(Finland)	DF	8 April 1990 (aged 25)	(Finland) Honka
6	Markus Heikkinen	(Finland)	DF	13 October 1978 (aged 37)	(Norway) Start
11	Veli Lampi	(Finland)	DF	18 July 1984 (aged 31)	(Ukraine) Arsenal Kyiv
15	Roni Peiponen	(Finland)	DF	9 April 1997 (aged 18)	(Finland) Klubi-04
27	Sebastian Sorsa	(Finland)	DF	25 January 1984 (aged 31)	(Scotland) Hamilton Academical
33	Taye Taiwo	(Nigeria)	DF	16 April 1985 (aged 30)	(Turkey) Bursaspor
Midfielders
7	Lucas Lingman*	(Finland)	MF	25 January 1998 (aged 17)	(Finland) Klubi-04
10	Atomu Tanaka	(Japan)	MF	4 October 1987 (aged 28)	(Japan) Albirex Niigata
13	Toni Kolehmainen	(Finland)	MF	20 July 1988 (aged 27)	(Norway) Hønefoss
20	Matti Klinga	(Finland)	MF	10 December 1994 (aged 20)	(Finland) Lahti
26	Obed Malolo	(Finland)	MF	18 April 1997 (aged 18)	(Finland) Klubi-04
28	Rasmus Schüller	(Finland)	MF	18 June 1991 (aged 24)	(Finland) Honka
91	Guy Moussi	(France)	MF	23 January 1985 (aged 30)	(England) Birmingham City
Forwards
8	Demba Savage	(The Gambia)	FW	17 June 1988 (aged 27)	(Finland) Honka
17	Nikolai Alho	(Finland)	FW	12 March 1993 (aged 22)	(Finland) Klubi-04
18	Ousman Jallow	(The Gambia)	FW	21 October 1988 (aged 27)	(Turkey) Çaykur Rizespor
22	Formose Mendy	(Guinea-Bissau)	FW	23 March 1989 (aged 26)	(England) Blackpool
80	Erfan Zeneli	(Finland)	FW	28 December 1986 (aged 28)	(Israel) Maccabi Petah Tikva
95	Ademir Candido	(Brazil)	FW	30 January 1995 (aged 20)	loan from (Brazil) Ituano
99	Macoumba Kandji	(Senegal)	FW	2 August 1985 (aged 30)	(Saudi Arabia) Al-Faisaly

- Dual registered with feeder team Klubi-04.

=== On loan ===
Note: Flags indicate national team as defined under FIFA eligibility rules; some limited exceptions apply. Players may hold more than one non-FIFA nationality.

No.	Pos.	Nation	Player
20	FW	FIN	Joel Pohjanpalo (on loan at Fortuna Düsseldorf)

== Transfers ==
=== Winter ===
In: Note: Flags indicate national team as defined under FIFA eligibility rules; some limited exceptions apply. Players may hold more than one non-FIFA nationality.

No.	Pos.	Nation	Player
1	GK	SWE	Daniel Örlund (from (Norway) Rosenborg)
10	MF	JPN	Atomu Tanaka (from (Japan) Albirex Niigata)
13	MF	FIN	Toni Kolehmainen (from (Norway) Hønefoss)
14	FW	JPN	Mike Havenaar (from (Spain) Córdoba)
18	FW	GAM	Ousman Jallow
22	FW	GBS	Formose Mendy (from (England) Blackpool)
91	MF	FRA	Guy Moussi (from (England) Birmingham City)

Out: Note: Flags indicate national team as defined under FIFA eligibility rules; some limited exceptions apply. Players may hold more than one non-FIFA nationality.

No.	Pos.	Nation	Player
1	GK	FIN	Ville Wallén (Retired)
4	MF	FIN	Mika Väyrynen (to (United States) LA Galaxy)
7	FW	FIN	Sebastian Mannström (to (Germany) SV Elversberg)
10	MF	FIN	Teemu Tainio (Retired)
12	GK	ESP	Toni Doblas (to (Spain) Cornellà)
13	GK	FIN	Carljohan Eriksson (to (Finland) HIFK)
20	FW	FIN	Joel Pohjanpalo (loan to (Germany) Fortuna Düsseldorf)
21	GK	DEN	Michael Tørnes (to (Norway) Sandefjord)
22	MF	FIN	Fredrik Lassas (to (Finland) HIFK)
30	FW	BFA	Aristide Bancé (to (Kazakhstan) Irtysh)
32	MF	GHA	Anthony Annan (to (Germany) 1860 München)
33	FW	FIN	Roni Porokara (to (Finland) Honka)
42	MF	FIN	Joel Perovuo (to (Finland) Honka)
99	FW	SEN	Macoumba Kandji (to (Saudi Arabia) Al-Faisaly)

=== Summer ===
In: Note: Flags indicate national team as defined under FIFA eligibility rules; some limited exceptions apply. Players may hold more than one non-FIFA nationality.

No.	Pos.	Nation	Player
4	DF	FIN	Juhani Ojala (loan from (Russia) Terek Grozny)
21	GK	GER	Thomas Dähne (from (Germany) RB Leipzig)
33	DF	NGR	Taye Taiwo (from (Turkey) Bursaspor)
95	FW	BRA	Ademir Candido (loan from (Brazil) Ituano)
99	FW	SEN	Macoumba Kandji (from (Saudi Arabia) Al-Faisaly)

Out: Note: Flags indicate national team as defined under FIFA eligibility rules; some limited exceptions apply. Players may hold more than one non-FIFA nationality.

No.	Pos.	Nation	Player
2	DF	FIN	Alex Lehtinen (to (Finland) Honka)
14	FW	JPN	Mike Havenaar (to (Netherlands) ADO Den Haag)
16	DF	FIN	Valtteri Moren (to (Belgium) Waasland-Beveren)
31	MF	FIN	Robin Lod (to (Greece) Panathinaikos)
35	GK	FIN	Saku-Pekka Sahlgren (loan to (Finland) KTP)

== Competitions ==
=== Veikkausliiga ===
The 2015 Veikkausliiga season begins on April 12, 2015, and ends on October 25, 2015. Veikkausliiga takes place in the spring to autumn season, due to harsh winter weather conditions in Finland.

==== League table ====
Pos	Team	Pld	W	D	L	GF	GA	GD	Pts	Qualification or relegation
1	SJK (C)	33	18	6	9	50	22	+28	60	Qualification for the Champions League second qualifying round
2	RoPS	33	17	8	8	44	29	+15	59	Qualification for the Europa League first qualifying round
3	HJK	33	16	10	7	45	30	+15	58	Qualification for the Europa League first qualifying round
4	Inter Turku	33	13	10	10	45	34	+11	49	
5	Lahti	33	12	12	9	38	36	+2	48	

Source: Veikkausliiga, Soccerway
Rules for classification: 1) Points; 2) Goal difference; 3) Goals scored; 4) Head-to-head points; 5) Head-to-head goal difference; 6) Head-to-head goals scored; 7) Fewer away goals allowed; 8) Home goals scored; 9) Fewer home goals allowed; 10) Play-off. (Note: Criteria 7–10 is only used if deciding Champion, teams to UEFA competitions or teams for relegation).
(C) Champions

==== Results summary ====
Overall								Home						Away					
Pld	W	D	L	GF	GA	GD	Pts	W	D	L	GF	GA	GD	W	D	L	GF	GA	GD
33	16	10	7	45	30	+15	58	11	4	2	28	11	+17	5	6	5	17	19	−2

Last updated: 25 October 2015.
Source: Soccerway

==== Results by matchday ====
Round	1	2	3	4	5	6	7	8	9	10	11	12	13	14	15	16	17	18	19	20	21	22	23	24	25	26	27	28	29	30	31	32	33
Ground	A	H	A	H	H	A	H	H	A	H	A	H	H	A	H	H	A	A	H	A	H	H	H	A	H	A	H	A	A	A	A	H	A
Result	W	D	D	W	W	L	W	W	D	W	W	D	W	D	W	W	D	L	D	L	W	W	D	L	L	D	L	L	D	W	W	W	W
Position	1	2	4	1	1	2	2	2	2	1	1	1	1	1	1	1	1	1	1	2	1	1	1	1	1	1	2	3	4	3	3	3	3

Updated to match(es) played on 25 October 2015. Source: Soccerway
A = Away; H = Home; W = Win; D = Draw; L = Loss

==== Results ====
12 April 2015 1	RoPS	1 – 3	HJK	Rovaniemi
17:00 EEST (UTC+3)	Lahdenmäki (yellow card) 17'; Okkonen (yellow card) 44'; A.Ibiyomi 58'; Yaghoubi (yellow card) 90'	Report	Zeneli (yellow card) 12' (goal) 45+2'; Heikkilä 19'; Schüller (yellow card) 61'; Tanaka 71'; Jallow (yellow card) 81'; Lampi (yellow card) 90+1'	Stadium: Keskuskenttä; Attendance: 1,281; Referee: Marko Grönholm

19 April 2015 2	HJK	1 – 1	Lahti	Helsinki
16:00 EEST (UTC+3)	Baah (yellow card) 24'; Klinga 42'	Report	L.Motta 20'; Länsitalo (yellow card) 61'; Joenmäki (yellow card) 69'	Stadium: Sonera Stadium; Attendance: 5,502; Referee: Dennis Antamo

23 April 2015 3	HIFK	1 – 1	HJK	Helsinki
18:30 EEST (UTC+3)	J.Korhonen 23' (pen.); J.Halme (yellow card) 38'; F.Lassas (yellow card) 72'; O-P.Jurvainen (yellow card) 78'	Report	Havenaar 4'	Stadium: Sonera Stadium; Attendance: 10,071; Referee: Mattias Gestranius

29 April 2015 4	HJK	1 – 0	KTP	Helsinki
18:30 EEST (UTC+3)	Sorsa (yellow card) 31'; Zeneli (yellow card) 87'; Savage 88'	Report	J.Mulvany (yellow card) 51'; Minkenen (yellow card) 54'; J.Pyhäranta (yellow card) 80'; Aspegren (yellow card) 90+3'	Stadium: Sonera Stadium; Attendance: 2,152; Referee: Mikka Lähdesmäki

3 May 2015 5	HJK	3 – 0	Jaro	Helsinki
16:00 EEST (UTC+3)	Zeneli 52' (yellow card) 62'; Savage 66', 87'	Report	Moore (yellow card) 37'	Stadium: Sonera Stadium; Attendance: 4,217; Referee: Mikko Mörö

8 May 2015 6	KuPS	1 – 0	HJK	Kuopio
18:30 EEST (UTC+3)	Poutiainen (yellow card) 17'; Trafford 23'	Report	Savage (yellow card) 21'	Stadium: Savon Sanomat Areena; Attendance: 4,093; Referee: Jari Järvinen

11 May 2015 7	HJK	1 – 0	VPS	Helsinki
18:30 EEST (UTC+3)	Lod 65'	Report	Miheso (yellow card) 47'; Abdulahi (yellow card) 89'	Stadium: Sonera Stadium; Attendance: 3,115; Referee: Tero Nieminen

14 May 2015 8	HJK	1 – 0	IFK Mariehamn	Helsinki
14:00 EEST (UTC+3)	Savage (yellow card) 52'; Peiponen (yellow card) 61'; Mendy 69'	Report	Ibrahim (yellow card) 38'	Stadium: Sonera Stadium; Attendance: 5,172; Referee: Ville Nevalainen

17 May 2015 9	VPS	2 – 2	HJK	Vaasa
17:00 EEST (UTC+3)	Seabrook 38'; P.Soiri (yellow card) 54'; Mäkelä 88'	Report	Koskimaa 43' (o.g.); Tanaka 62'; Lampi (yellow card) 81'	Stadium: Hietalahti Stadium; Attendance: 1,712; Referee: Petri Viljanen

21 May 2015 10	HJK	2 – 0	Inter Turku	Helsinki
18:30 EEST (UTC+3)	Havenaar 58', 73'	Report	Kanakoudis (yellow card) 22'; V.Onovo (yellow card) 65'	Stadium: Sonera Stadium; Attendance: 5,301; Referee: Dennis Antamo

24 May 2015 11	SJK	1 – 2	HJK	Seinäjoki
18:30 EEST (UTC+3)	Aalto (yellow card) 15'; Vasara (yellow card) 22'; Pelvas 31'	Report	Lampi (yellow card) 39'; Savage 50'; Tanaka 76'	Stadium: Seinäjoen keskuskenttä Attendance: 4,027; Referee: Mattias Gestranius

29 May 2015 12	HJK	1 – 1	KuPS	Helsinki
18:30 EEST (UTC+3)	Savage 15' (yellow card) 59'; Schüller (yellow card) 35'; Moussi (yellow card) 89'	Report	Trafford 11'; Hatakka (yellow card) 43'; T.Markić (yellow card) 54'; F.Chibuike (yellow card) 70'; Sohna (yellow card) 75'	Stadium: Sonera Stadium; Attendance: 3,590; Referee: Petteri Kari

3 June 2015 13	HJK	2 – 1	Ilves	Helsinki
18:30 EEST (UTC+3)	Savage 14' (yellow card) 35'; Sorsa 53'	Report	Lahtinen 21'; O.Khary (yellow card) 68'	Stadium: Sonera Stadium; Attendance: 3,912; Referee: Jari Järvinen

7 June 2015 14	Lahti	0 – 0	HJK	Lahti
14:00 EEST (UTC+3)		Report	Heikkinen (yellow card) 34'; Schüller (yellow card) 67'; Havenaar (yellow card) 75'	Stadium: Lahti Stadium; Attendance: 3,195; Referee: Dennis Antamo

17 June 2015 15	HJK	3 – 1	SJK	Helsinki
18:30 EEST (UTC+3)	Zeneli 17'; Baah (yellow card) 60'; Tanaka (yellow card) 64' (goal) 90+1'; Havenaar 72'	Report	Brown (yellow card) 16'; Lähde (yellow card) 64'; Lehtinen 90+3'	Stadium: Sonera Stadium; Attendance: 4,121; Referee: Petri Viljanen

22 June 2015 16	HJK	4 – 0	FF Jaro	Helsinki
18:30 EEST (UTC+3)	Tanaka 59'; Zeneli 72' (pen.), 77'; Jallow 88'	Report	J. Brunell (yellow card) 44' (yellow-red card) 56'; D. Kadio (yellow card) 46'; Opiyo (yellow card) 51'	Stadium: Sonera Stadium; Attendance: 2,927; Referee: Ville Nevalainen

26 June 2015 17	Ilves	1 – 1	HJK	Tampere
18:30 EEST (UTC+3)	Lahtinen (yellow card) 36'; Korte (yellow card) 73'; Hjelm 86'	Report	Tanaka 57' (yellow card) 71'; Baah (yellow card) 88'; Peiponen (yellow card) 90+3'	Stadium: Tammela Stadion; Attendance: 5,050; Referee: Jani Laaksonen

29 June 2015 18	Inter Turku	3 – 0	HJK	Turku
18:30 EEST (UTC+3)	V. Onovo 7', 37', 48'; Aho (yellow card) 87'	Report		Stadium: Veritas Stadion; Attendance: 4,043; Referee: Mattias Gestranius

6 July 2015 19	HJK	1 – 1	HIFK	Helsinki
18:30 EEST (UTC+3)	Tanaka 49'	Report	Bäckman (yellow card) 48'; Kuusijärvi (yellow card) 83'; Vesala 86'	Stadium: Sonera Stadium; Attendance: 10,521; Referee: Dennis Antamo

10 July 2015 20	RoPS	2 – 1	HJK	Rovaniemi
18:30 EEST (UTC+3)	Pirinen 16'; Kokko 45+2'; Ricardo (yellow card) 54'	Report	Schüller (yellow card) 19'; Baah (yellow card) 37'; Zeneli 54' (pen.); Sorsa (yellow card) 58'	Stadium: Keskuskenttä; Attendance: 4,768; Referee: Mattias Gestranius

25 July 2015 21	HJK	2 – 1	KTP	Helsinki
16:00 EEST (UTC+3)	Zeneli 6'; Moussi (yellow card) 44'; Jallow 90+5' (pen.)	Report	van Gelderen (yellow card) 5'; Minkenen (yellow card) 36'; Gruborovics 48'; Aspegren (yellow card) 72'; G. Ositashvili (yellow card) 78'	Stadium: Sonera Stadium; Attendance: 3,647; Referee: Mikko Mörö

12 August 2015 22	HJK	1 – 0	Lahti	Helsinki
18:30 EEST (UTC+3)	Baah (yellow card) 12'; Jallow 31'; Kolehmainen (yellow card) 82'; Zeneli (yellow card) 90+2'	Report	Pasanen (yellow card) 85'; Paananen (yellow card) 89'	Stadium: Sonera Stadium; Attendance: 4,125; Referee: Petri Viljanen

24 August 2015 23	HJK	1 – 1	HIFK	Helsinki
18:30 EEST (UTC+3)	Schüller (yellow card) 36'; Mendy 38'; Kolehmainen (yellow card) 84'	Report	Sinisalo 58'	Stadium: Sonera Stadium; Attendance: 10,325; Referee: Ville Nevalainen

30 August 2015 24	Ilves	1 – 0	HJK	Tampere
18:30 EEST (UTC+3)	Petrescu 31'; Hynynen (yellow card) 53'; Ojanperä (yellow card) 57'; J.Rantanen (yellow card) 85'	Report	Peiponen (yellow card) 32'; Moussi (yellow card) 76'	Stadium: Tammela Stadion; Attendance: 5,050; Referee: Ville Nevalainen

10 September 2015 25	HJK	0 – 2	Inter Turku	Helsinki
18:30 EEST (UTC+3)	Heikkilä (red card) 47'; Moussi (yellow card) 76'; Ojala (yellow card) 82'	Report	Gnabouyou 48' (pen.); Mannström 56'; Kanakoudis (yellow card) 89'	Stadium: Sonera Stadium; Attendance: 6,052; Referee: Mikko Mörö

13 September 2015 26	FF Jaro	1 – 1	HJK	Jakobstad
18:30 EEST (UTC+3)	Kadio (yellow card) 40' (goal) 76'; Moore (yellow card) 40'; A.Eremenko (yellow card) 60'	Report	Tanaka 30' (yellow card) 32'; Savage (yellow card) 47'; Klinga (yellow card) 61'; A. Halme (yellow card) 76'	Stadium: Jakobstads Centralplan; Attendance: 1,792; Referee: Jarno Laaksonen

20 September 2015 27	HJK	0 – 2	RoPS	Helsinki
16:00 EEST (UTC+3)		Report	Yaghoubi (yellow card) 21'; Kokko 40'; J. Saksela (yellow card) 52'; Markkanen 71'	Stadium: Sonera Stadium; Attendance: 9,111; Referee: Dennis Antamo

23 September 2015 28	SJK	3 – 0	HJK	Seinäjoki
17:00 EEST (UTC+3)	T.Tahvanainen 17'; Riski 55'; Ngueukam 64'	Report	Baah (yellow card) 24'	Stadium: Seinäjoen keskuskenttä Attendance: 4,311; Referee: Marko Grönholm

27 September 2015 29	KTP	1 – 1	HJK	Kotka
18:30 EEST (UTC+3)	Nosh A Lody 45' (yellow card) 90'	Report	Savage (yellow card) 32'; Jallow 78'	Stadium: Arto Tolsa Areena; Attendance: 2,645; Referee: Ville Nevalainen

1 October 2015 30	IFK Mariehamn	0 – 2	HJK	Mariehamn
18:30 EEST (UTC+3)		Report	Peiponen 28'; Kolehmainen 52'	Stadium: Wiklöf Holding Arena; Attendance: 1,143; Referee: Petri Viljanen

4 October 2015 31	VPS	1 – 2	HJK	Vaasa
15:00 EEST (UTC+3)	Koskimaa (yellow card) 64'; Mäkelä 90'	Report	Heikkilä 4' (yellow card) 71'; Koskimaa 36' (o.g.); Peiponen (yellow card) 67'; Savage (yellow card) 89'	Stadium: Kaarlen kenttä Attendance: 2,182; Referee: Ville Nevalainen

18 October 2015 32	HJK	4 – 0	IFK Mariehamn	Helsinki
14:00 EEST (UTC+3)	Zeneli 51' (pen.); Jallow 54'; Savage 79', 90+1'; Baah (yellow card) 86'	Report	A.Granlund (yellow card) 51'; Kangaskolkka (yellow card) 67'; Assis (yellow card) 86'	Stadium: Sonera Stadium; Attendance: 5,988; Referee: Vile Nevalainen

25 October 2015 33	KuPS	0 – 1	HJK	Kuopio
13:00 EET (UTC+2)	Sohna (yellow card) 19'; T.Markić (yellow card) 36'; Diallo (yellow card) 80'	Report	Jallow (yellow card) 40' (goal) 76'; Zeneli (yellow card) 44'; Heikkilä (yellow card) 90+3'	Stadium: Savon Sanomat Areena; Attendance: 3,080; Referee: Marko Grönholm

=== Finnish Cup ===
15 April 2015 Sixth Round	PK-35 Vantaa	1 – 2 (a.e.t.)	HJK	Vantaa
18:30 EEST (UTC+3)	R.Heinonen (yellow card) 74'; K.Manev 83'; S.Redjepi (yellow card) 84'; B.Jeng (yellow card) 93'	Report	Tanaka (yellow card) 46'; L.Lingman (yellow card) 58'; Lod 66'; Havenaar 97'	Stadium: ISS Stadion; Attendance: 1,772; Referee: Petri Viljanen

26 April 2015 Quarterfinal	FC Haka	1 – 3	HJK	Valkeakoski
16:00 EEST (UTC+3)	T.Lähdesmäki (yellow card) 26' (goal) 49'	Report	Savage 18', 52'; Tanaka 90+1'	Stadium: Tehtaan kenttä Attendance: 1,102; Referee: Marko Grönholm

15 August 2015 Semifinal	IFK Mariehamn	5 – 1	HJK	Mariehamn
15:00 EEST (UTC+3)	Assis 3'; Orgill 33', 67' (yellow card) 59'; Tammilehto 50'; Forsell 52'	Report	Tanaka 47'; Baah (yellow card) 80'	Stadium: Wiklöf Holding Arena; Attendance: 1,114; Referee: Marko Grönholm

=== League Cup ===
Pos	Team	Pld	W	D	L	GF	GA	GD	Pts	Qualification
1	HJK	4	1	3	0	6	4	+2	6	Knockout stage
2	RoPS	4	1	2	1	6	6	0	5	Knockout stage
3	KTP	4	0	3	1	4	6	−2	3	

Updated to match(es) played on 25 February 2015. Source: veikkausliiga.com
Rules for classification: 1) points; 2) goal difference; 3) number of goals scored; 4) head-to-head points; 5) head-to-head goal difference; 6) goals scored in head-to-head

4 February 2015 Group A	KTP	0 – 0	HJK	Kotka
18:30 EET (UTC+2)	Aspegren (yellow card) 19'; J.Veija (yellow card) 61'	Report		Stadium: Ruonalan Urheiluhalli; Attendance: 681; Referee: Miikka Lähdesmäki

13 February 2015 Group A	RoPS	0 – 2	HJK	Oulu
18:00 EET (UTC+2)		Report	A.Lehtinen (yellow card) 47'; Lod 82'; Tanaka 90+2'	Stadium: Arina Areena; Attendance: 562; Referee: Dennis Antamo

17 February 2015 Group A	HJK	2 – 2	RoPS	Helsinki
17:00 EET (UTC+2)	Baah (yellow card) 56' (goal) 68'; Zeneli 89'	Report	Obilor 15' (yellow card) 68'; Janne Saksela 20'; T.Hradecky (yellow card) 39'; L.Nurmos (yellow card) 64'; Jammeh (yellow card) 89'	Stadium: Tali Halli; Attendance: 745; Referee: Mikko Mörö

22 February 2015 Group A	HJK	2 – 2	KTP	Helsinki
16:00 EET (UTC+2)	Schüller (yellow card) 41'; Jallow 45'; Baah (yellow card) 47'; Zeneli 73'	Report	Minkenen 33'; McFaul (yellow card) 57'; Kaivonurmi 75'	Stadium: Tali Halli; Attendance: 733; Referee: Mattias Gestranius

6 March 2015 Quarterfinal	HJK	2 – 0	Lahti	Helsinki
16:00 EET (UTC+2)	Zeneli 38'; Havenaar 85'	Report	Gela (yellow card) 21' (yellow-red card) 27'	Stadium: Tali Halli; Attendance: 702; Referee: Petteri Kari

14 March 2015 Semifinal	HJK	2 – 0	HIFK	Helsinki
14:00 EET (UTC+2)	L.Järvenpää 60'; Jama 90+4'	Report	J.Halme (yellow card) 52'; Aho (yellow card) 90'	Stadium: Tali Halli; Attendance: 542; Referee: Tommi Grönman

4 April 2015 Final	RoPS	0 – 2	HJK	Rovaniemi
15:00 EEST (UTC+3)	Saxman (yellow card) 72'; Yaghoubi (yellow card) 73'; Obilor (yellow card) 76'	Report	Lod 9'; Moussi (yellow card) 51'; Havenaar 57' (yellow card) 76'	Stadium: Keskuskenttä; Attendance: 907; Referee: Jari Järvinen

=== UEFA Champions League ===
14 July 2015 Second qualifying round 1st leg	Ventspils (Latvia)	1 – 3	(Finland) HJK	Ventspils, Latvia
18:30 EEST (UTC+3)	Jemeļins (yellow card) 15' (goal) 63'; Krjauklis (yellow card) 74'	Report	Moussi (yellow card) 34'; Baah (yellow card) 52'; Zeneli 75' (pen.); Jallow 86'; Tanaka 90+2'	Stadium: Ventspils Olimpiskais Stadions; Attendance: 2,450; Referee: Jakob Kehlet (Denmark)

21 July 2015 Second qualifying round 2nd leg	HJK (Finland)	1 – 0 (4 – 1 agg.)	(Latvia) Ventspils	Helsinki, Finland
19:00 EEST (UTC+3)	Havenaar 83'	Report	Žuļevs (yellow card) 14'; Rugins (yellow card) 39'; Siņeļņikovs (yellow card) 81'	Stadium: Sonera Stadium; Attendance: 6,562; Referee: Andreas Ekberg (Sweden)

29 July 2015 Third qualifying round 1st leg	HJK (Finland)	0 – 0	(Kazakhstan) Astana	Helsinki, Finland
19:00 EEST (UTC+3)	Zeneli (yellow card) 33'; Baah (yellow card) 55'	Report	Dzholchiev (yellow card) 35'; Postnikov (yellow card) 79'	Stadium: Sonera Stadium; Attendance: 9,788; Referee: Alexandru Tudor (Romania)

5 August 2015 Third qualifying round 2nd leg	Astana (Kazakhstan)	4 – 3 (4 – 3 agg.)	(Finland) HJK	Astana, Kazakhstan
17:00 EEST (UTC+3)	Twumasi 44' (red card) 71'; Ilić (yellow card) 45+1'; Cañas 47' (pen.); Shomko 56'; Maksimović (yellow card) 90+1'; Postnikov 90+3'	Report	Jallow 4'; Baah 42'; Moren (yellow card) 75'; Zeneli 86' (pen.)	Stadium: Astana Arena; Attendance: 27,937; Referee: Alon Yefet (Israel)

=== UEFA Europa League ===
20 August 2015 Play-off round	Krasnodar (Russia)	5 – 1	(Finland) HJK	Krasnodar, Russia
20:00 EEST (UTC+3)	Ojala 8' (o.g.); Mamaev 9' (pen.); Bystrov (yellow card) 43'; Smolov 57' (pen.); Wánderson 61'; Gazinskiy 63'	Report	Jallow 18' (yellow card) 56'; Peiponen (yellow card) 56'; Ojala (yellow card) 56'; Schüller (yellow card) 68'	Stadium: Kuban Stadium; Referee: Marijo Strahonja (Croatia)

27 August 2015 Play-off round	HJK (Finland)	0 – 0 (1 – 5 agg.)	(Russia) Krasnodar	Helsinki, Finland
20:00 EEST (UTC+3)	Schüller (yellow card) 36'; Mendy (yellow card) 44'	Report	Torbinski (yellow card) 69'; Jędrzejczyk (yellow card) 90+1'	Stadium: Sonera Stadium; Referee: Felix Zwayer (Germany)

== Squad statistics ==
As of Match played 25 October 2015

=== Appearances and goals ===
No.	Pos	Nat	Player	Total		Veikkausliiga		Finnish Cup		League Cup		Champions League/Europa League	
No.	Pos	Nat	Player	Apps	Goals	Apps	Goals	Apps	Goals	Apps	Goals	Apps	Goals
1	GK	(Sweden) SWE	Daniel Örlund	26	0	20	0	0	0	1	0	5	0
3	DF	(Ghana) GHA	Gideon Baah	29	2	14+2	0	2	0	5+1	1	5	1
4	DF	(Finland) FIN	Juhani Ojala	6	0	4	0	0	0	0	0	2	0
5	DF	(Finland) FIN	Tapio Heikkilä	41	2	25+2	2	3	0	4+2	0	3+2	0
6	DF	(Finland) FIN	Markus Heikkinen	28	0	17+2	0	0	0	3	0	5+1	0
7	MF	(Finland) FIN	Lucas Lingman	10	0	2+2	0	0+2	0	0+3	0	0+1	0
8	FW	(The Gambia) GAM	Demba Savage	30	10	18+7	8	1	2	0+1	0	3	0
10	MF	(Japan) JPN	Atomu Tanaka	45	12	30+1	8	2+1	2	5	1	5+1	1
11	DF	(Finland) FIN	Veli Lampi	21	0	13+1	0	1+1	0	3+2	0	0	0
13	MF	(Finland) FIN	Toni Kolehmainen	23	1	14+7	1	1	0	0	0	0+1	0
15	DF	(Finland) FIN	Roni Peiponen	26	1	14+3	1	2	0	3+1	0	2+1	0
17	FW	(Finland) FIN	Nikolai Alho	2	0	0+2	0	0	0	0	0	0	0
18	FW	(The Gambia) GAM	Ousman Jallow	34	10	11+9	6	3	0	3+2	1	3+3	3
20	MF	(Finland) FIN	Matti Klinga	27	1	11+8	1	3	0	1+2	0	1+1	0
21	GK	(Germany) GER	Thomas Dähne	8	0	6	0	1	0	0	0	1	0
22	FW	(Guinea-Bissau) GBS	Formose Mendy	18	2	5+8	2	2	0	0	0	2+1	0
26	MF	(Finland) FIN	Obed Malolo	23	0	6+9	0	2+1	0	4	0	0+1	0
27	DF	(Finland) FIN	Sebastian Sorsa	34	1	20+4	1	1	0	5	0	4	0
28	MF	(Finland) FIN	Rasmus Schüller	41	0	27+2	0	0+1	0	5	0	6	0
33	DF	(Nigeria) NGR	Taye Taiwo	11	0	11	0	0	0	0	0	0	0
35	GK	(Finland) FIN	Saku-Pekka Sahlgren	14	0	7	0	2	0	4+1	0	0	0
80	FW	(Finland) FIN	Erfan Zeneli	40	13	27	8	1+1	0	5	3	6	2
91	MF	(France) FRA	Guy Moussi	33	0	15+7	0	1	0	3+1	0	6	0
95	FW	(Brazil) BRA	Ademir Candido	2	0	0+2	0	0	0	0	0	0	0
99	FW	(Senegal) SEN	Macoumba Kandji	5	0	5	0	0	0	0	0	0	0
Players from Klubi-04 who appeared:
1	GK	(Finland) FIN	Tomi Mikkelsson	1	0	0	0	0	0	0+1	0	0	0
12	GK	(Finland) FIN	Matias Sauramaa	2	0	0	0	0	0	2	0	0	0
14	FW	(Finland) FIN	Samuel Haglund	3	0	0	0	0	0	1+2	0	0	0
24	DF	(Finland) FIN	Aapo Halme	2	0	2	0	0	0	0	0	0	0
25	DF	(Finland) FIN	Leo Väisänen	1	0	0	0	0+1	0	0	0	0	0
33	MF	(Finland) FIN	Calvin N'Sombo	2	0	0	0	0	0	1+1	0	0	0
40	MF	(Finland) FIN	Karim Zine	1	0	0	0	0	0	1	0	0	0
41	DF	(Finland) FIN	Joachim Böckerman	3	0	0+2	0	0	0	1	0	0	0
43	MF	(Finland) FIN	Sebastian Dahlström	1	0	0	0	0	0	1	0	0	0
44	MF	(Finland) FIN	Joel Koivurinta	1	0	0	0	0	0	1	0	0	0
45	MF	(Finland) FIN	Omar Khary	1	0	0	0	0	0	1	0	0	0
48	DF	(Finland) FIN	Lassi Järvenpää	1	1	0	0	0	0	1	1	0	0
49	FW	(Finland) FIN	Lassi Lappalainen	1	0	0	0	0	0	1	0	0	0
50	FW	(Finland) FIN	Mauricio Hopsu	1	0	0	0	0	0	1	0	0	0
55	DF	(Finland) FIN	Otto Pitkänen	1	0	0	0	0	0	1	0	0	0
57	FW	(Finland) FIN	Kelechi Anyamele	1	0	0	0	0	0	0+1	0	0	0
59	MF	(Finland) FIN	Omar Jama	1	1	0	0	0	0	0+1	1	0	0
Players who left HJK during the season:
2	DF	(Finland) FIN	Alex Lehtinen	12	0	3+2	0	2	0	3+1	0	1	0
14	FW	(Japan) JPN	Mike Havenaar	27	8	15+5	4	0+1	1	1+1	2	4	1
16	DF	(Finland) FIN	Valtteri Moren	18	0	12	0	1	0	2+1	0	2	0
31	MF	(Finland) FIN	Robin Lod	17	4	9+1	1	2	1	5	2	0	0

=== Goal scorers ===
Place	Position	Nation	Number	Name	Veikkausliiga	Finnish Cup	League Cup	UEFA Champions League/Europa League	Total
1	FW	(Finland)	80	Erfan Zeneli	8	0	3	2	13
2	MF	(Japan)	10	Atomu Tanaka	8	2	1	1	12
3	FW	(The Gambia)	8	Demba Savage	8	2	0	0	10
3	FW	(The Gambia)	18	Ousman Jallow	6	0	1	3	10
5	FW	(Japan)	14	Mike Havenaar	4	1	2	1	8
6	MF	(Finland)	31	Robin Lod	1	1	2	0	4
7	DF	(Ghana)	3	Gideon Baah	0	0	1	1	2
7	DF	(Finland)	5	Tapio Heikkilä	2	0	0	0	2
7	FW	(Guinea-Bissau)	22	Formose Mendy	2	0	0	0	2
10	MF	(Finland)	13	Toni Kolehmainen	1	0	0	0	1
10	DF	(Finland)	15	Roni Peiponen	1	0	0	0	1
10	MF	(Finland)	20	Matti Klinga	1	0	0	0	1
10	DF	(Finland)	27	Sebastian Sorsa	1	0	0	0	1
10	DF	(Finland)	48	Lassi Järvenpää	0	0	1	0	1
10	MF	(Finland)	59	Omar Jama	0	0	1	0	1
#	Own goals				2	0	0	0	2
TOTALS					45	6	12	8	71

=== Disciplinary record ===
Number	Nation	Position	Name	Veikkausliiga		Finnish Cup		League Cup		UEFA Champions League/Europa League		Total	
Number	Nation	Position	Name	Yellow card	Red card	Yellow card	Red card	Yellow card	Red card	Yellow card	Red card	Yellow card	Red card
2	(Finland)	DF	Alex Lehtinen	0	0	0	0	1	0	0	0	1	0
3	(Ghana)	DF	Gideon Baah	7	0	1	0	2	0	2	0	12	0
4	(Finland)	DF	Juhani Ojala	1	0	0	0	0	0	1	0	2	0
5	(Finland)	DF	Tapio Heikkilä	2	1	0	0	0	0	0	0	2	1
6	(Finland)	DF	Markus Heikkinen	1	0	0	0	0	0	0	0	1	0
7	(Finland)	MF	Lucas Lingman	0	0	1	0	0	0	0	0	1	0
8	(The Gambia)	FW	Demba Savage	7	0	0	0	0	0	0	0	7	0
10	(Japan)	MF	Atomu Tanaka	3	0	1	0	0	0	0	0	4	0
11	(Finland)	DF	Veli Lampi	3	0	0	0	0	0	0	0	3	0
13	(Finland)	MF	Toni Kolehmainen	2	0	0	0	0	0	0	0	2	0
14	(Japan)	FW	Mike Havenaar	1	0	0	0	1	0	0	0	2	0
15	(Finland)	DF	Roni Peiponen	4	0	0	0	0	0	1	0	5	0
16	(Finland)	DF	Valtteri Moren	0	0	0	0	0	0	1	0	1	0
18	(The Gambia)	FW	Ousman Jallow	2	0	0	0	0	0	1	0	3	0
20	(Finland)	MF	Matti Klinga	1	0	0	0	0	0	0	0	1	0
22	(Guinea-Bissau)	FW	Formose Mendy	0	0	0	0	0	0	1	0	1	0
24	(Finland)	DF	Aapo Halme	1	0	0	0	0	0	0	0	1	0
27	(Finland)	DF	Sebastian Sorsa	3	0	0	0	0	0	0	0	3	0
28	(Finland)	MF	Rasmus Schüller	4	0	0	0	1	0	2	0	7	0
80	(Finland)	FW	Erfan Zeneli	5	0	0	0	0	0	1	0	6	0
91	(France)	MF	Guy Moussi	4	0	0	0	1	0	1	0	6	0
TOTALS				51	1	3	0	6	0	11	0	71	1
