= Zeneli =

Zeneli is a surname. Notable people with the surname include:

- Arbër Zeneli (born 1995), Kosovar football attacking midfielder and left winger
- Asim Zeneli, Albanian partisan
- Besfort Zeneli (born 2002), Swedish football midfielder
- Two brothers:
  - Erfan Zeneli (born 1986), Finnish football striker and left winger
  - Ridvan Zeneli (born 1979), Kosovar-Finnish football midfielder
- Ilir Zeneli (born 1984), Kosovar-Finnish football manager

== See also ==
- Asim Zeneli Gymnasium, school in Gjirokastër, Albania, named after Asim Zeneli
