= Ojanperä =

Ojanperä is a Finnish surname. Notable people with the surname include:

- Abraham Ojanperä (1856–1916), Finnish singer
- Antti Ojanperä (born 1983), Finnish footballer
- Olavi Ojanperä (1921–2016), Finnish sprint canoeist
