= 2008 Empress's Cup final =

2008 Empress's Cup Final
Nippon TV Beleza	INAC Leonessa
4	1
- Date: January 1, 2009
- Venue: National Stadium, Tokyo

2008 Empress's Cup Final was the 30th final of the Empress's Cup competition. The final was played at National Stadium in Tokyo on January 1, 2009. Nippon TV Beleza won the championship.

== Overview ==
Defending champion Nippon TV Beleza won their 9th title, by defeating INAC Leonessa 4–1 with Yayoi Kobayashi, Eriko Arakawa, Homare Sawa and Mana Iwabuchi goal. Nippon TV Beleza won the title for 2 years in a row.

== Match details ==
January 1, 2009

Nippon TV Beleza	4-1	INAC Leonessa
Yayoi Kobayashi 15'; Eriko Arakawa 21'; Homare Sawa 60'; Mana Iwabuchi 82'	Report	Miwa Yonetsu 89'

National Stadium

== See also ==
- 2008 Empress's Cup
