= Vesala (surname) =

Vesala is a Finnish surname. Notable people with the surname include:

- Edward Vesala (1945–1999), Finnish avant-garde jazz drummer
- Paula Vesala (born 1981), Finnish singer-songwriter, actress and playwright
- Tommi Vesala (born 1986), Finnish football player
