= Mike Havenaar =

Japanese footballer (born 1987)

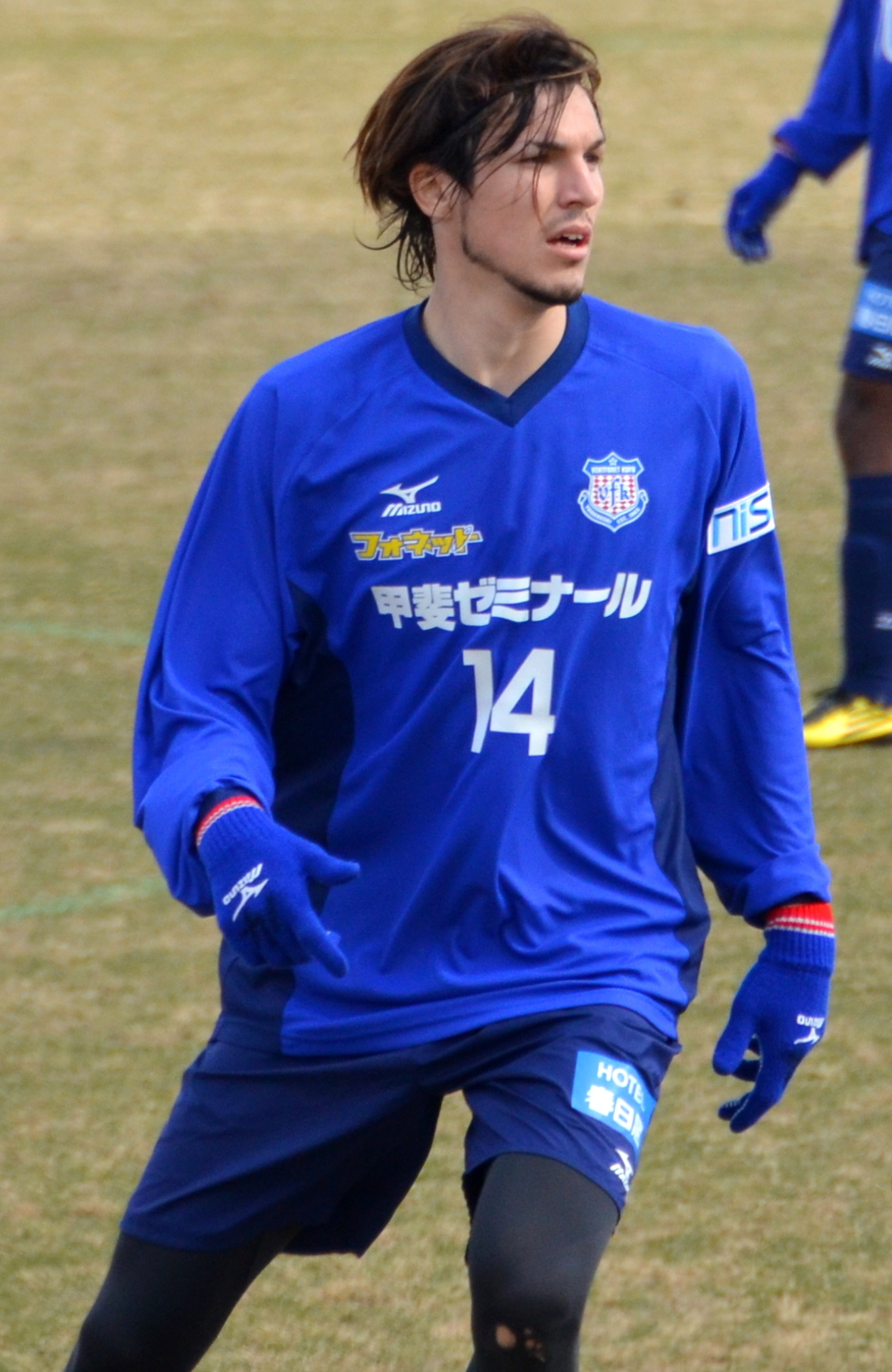
- Havenaar in 2011

Personal information
- Full name: Mike Havenaar
- Date of birth: 20 May 1987 (age 39)
- Place of birth: Hiroshima, Japan
- Height: 1.94 m (6 ft 4 in)
- Position: Forward

Youth career
- Sapporo FC
- 2000–2002: Consadole Sapporo
- 2003–2005: Yokohama F. Marinos

Senior career*
Years	Team	Apps	(Gls)
2006–2010	Yokohama F. Marinos	26	(0)
2008	→ Avispa Fukuoka (loan)	26	(7)
2009	→ Sagan Tosu (loan)	33	(15)
2010–2011	Ventforet Kofu	63	(37)
2012–2014	Vitesse	79	(26)
2014	Córdoba	5	(0)
2015	HJK Helsinki	20	(4)
2015–2017	ADO Den Haag	59	(25)
2017–2020	Vissel Kobe	13	(3)
2018	→ Vegalta Sendai (loan)	6	(1)
2019	→ Bangkok United (loan)	7	(3)
2020	Ventforet Kofu	14	(0)
2021–2022	Bombonera Gifu	15	(6)

International career^{‡}
2005–2007	Japan U-20	10	(18)
2011–2016	Japan	18	(4)
Medal record
Vegalta Sendai
Runner-up	Emperor's Cup	2018
Representing Japan
AFC U-19 Championship
Silver medal – second place	2006 India
- * Club domestic league appearances and goals as of 05:43, 5 January 2023 (UTC) ‡ National team caps and goals as of 24 March 2016

Mike Havenaar (ハーフナー・マイク, Hāfunā Maiku; born 20 May 1987) is a Japanese former professional footballer who played as a forward.

== Early life ==
Havenaar's parents came to Japan from the Netherlands in 1986 when his father Dido signed for Hiroshima-based side Mazda FC of the Japan Soccer League (now Sanfrecce Hiroshima of the J1 League). His mother was an athlete and a former national champion in the heptathlon. His younger brother Nikki currently plays for SV Ried and has previously played for the U-17 and U-18 Japan national team as centre back. The Havenaar family became naturalized Japanese citizens in 1994.

== Club career ==
Havenaar began his career with the Consadole Sapporo U-15 side, where his father played and later worked as goalkeeper coach.

When Dido moved to powerhouse Yokohama F. Marinos, Mike joined the Marinos youth side and promoted to the top team in 2006. Playing as a forward, Havenaar made his debut as a professional on 15 April 2006, against Gamba Osaka. Havenaar and his father are the first father-son combination to play in the J. League.

He was loaned to second division club Avispa Fukuoka and Sagan Tosu and showed respectable results.

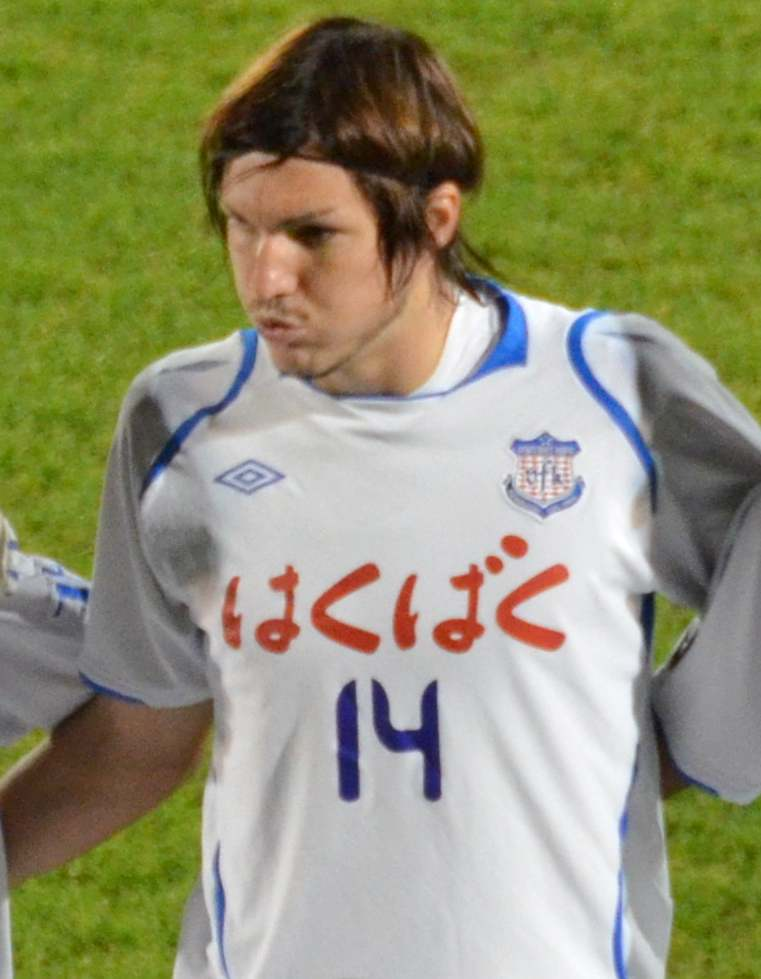
Havenaar playing for Ventforet Kofu in 2010

In 2010, he joined Ventforet Kofu, scoring 20 goals in 30 appearances for the club, helping them gain promotion to J1 League.

In 2011, Havenaar returned to Division 1 with Venforet and netted 17 times in 32 appearances. He received the J. League Best Eleven award after the season. Despite his contendership for the Top Scorer award, Kofu was relegated at the end of the season.

=== Vitesse ===
On 21 December 2011, Dutch side Vitesse Arnhem announced that they completed the signing of Havenaar on a two-and-a-half-year contract beating out the likes of Bundesliga side Wolfsburg for his signature.

Havenaar made his debut for the club as a 73rd-minute substitute for Nicky Hofs in their 1–0 away defeat to rivals NEC Nijmegen. His first goal came in his next appearance, a 3–1 loss to PSV. Havenaar made his first start for Vitesse on 4 February 2012 and provided an assist to Nicky Hofs first goal of the season, securing a 1–0 win NAC Breda. Havenaar scored his second goal for his new club in another losing effort, this time a 4–1 loss to title contenders FC Twente. Havenaar continued to impress for Vitesse, slotting the ball home after a cutting pass from Alexander Büttner to complete a 2–0 victory over De Graafschap on 4 March. Away against FC Groningen he made the third goal for Vitesse in the last minute, the game ended in 1–3 for Vitesse.

=== Córdoba ===
On 21 July 2014, it was announced by Córdoba CF that they had signed Havenaar. He made his La Liga debut on 25 August 2014, starting in a 0–2 away loss against Real Madrid.

On 30 December 2014 Havenaar was released by the Andalusians, after appearing in only five matches and scoring no goals during his spell for Córdoba CF.

=== HJK Helsinki ===
On 2 March 2015, it was announced by HJK Helsinki that they had signed Havenaar. He made his competitive debut for HJK on 6 March 2015 in the Finnish League Cup and scored the second goal in a 2–0 win. On 4 April 2015, Havenaar scored the second goal in the 57th minute to secure a 2–0 win and the League Cup against RoPS.

=== ADO Den Haag ===
On 11 August 2015, Dutch Eredivisie side ADO Den Haag announced that they had signed Mike Havenaar as a striker. On 3 July 2017, ADO Den Haag officially announced that Havenaar would be leaving the club to move back to Japan and join J1 league side Vissel Kobe. During his two seasons at ADO, the striker scored a total of 27 goals, including a goal on the last day of the 2016/17 season in the 4–1 win over Excelsior.

=== Vissel Kobe ===
On 3 July 2017, Havenaar joined Japanese J1 league side Vissel Kobe.

=== Bonbonera Gifu ===
On 26 January 2021, Havenaar joined Tōkai Adult Soccer League side Bombonera Gifu.

== International career ==
In 2007, Havenaar was picked to join the Japan U-20 squad to compete 2007 FIFA U-20 World Cup in Canada and played one match against Nigeria U-20.

In August 2011, he was called up to Japan's training squad.

He made his debut for Japan on 2 September 2011 as a 70th-minute substitute against North Korea in a 2014 FIFA World Cup qualifier match, striking the post. He scored his first ever goals for the national team with a brace, both headers, against Tajikistan on 11 October 2011 in the same competition. Japan won the game 8–0. Havenaar also participated in FIFA Confederations Cup 2013 coming on as a substitute and playing a total of 11 minutes in the competition.

== Personal life ==
Havenaar is trilingual. He was brought up bilingual, speaking Japanese and his parents' native Dutch and learned fluent English at the Yokohama International School. Havenaar got married in 2011 and in the same year, his first daughter was born on 5 August. His younger brother Nikki is also a professional footballer.

== Career statistics ==
=== Club ===
As of 26 October 2019

Appearances and goals by club, season and competition
Club	Season	Division	League		National cup (Note: Includes Emperor's Cup, KNVB Cup, Suomen Cup)		League cup (Note: Includes J. League Cup, Finnish League Cup and Thai League Cup)		Continental (Note: Includes UEFA Europa League.)		Other (Note: Includes Eredivisie Playoffs.)		Total	
Club	Season	Division	Apps	Goals	Apps	Goals	Apps	Goals	Apps	Goals	Apps	Goals	Apps	Goals
Yokohama F. Marinos	2006	J1 League	9	0	–		6	0	–		–		15	0
Yokohama F. Marinos	2007	J1 League	15	0	–		4	1	–		–		19	1
Yokohama F. Marinos	2009	J1 League	2	0	–		–		–		–		2	0
Avispa Fukuoka (loan)	2008	J2 League	26	7	–		–		–		–		26	7
Sagan Tosu (loan)	2009	J2 League	33	15	2	2	–		–		–		35	17
Ventforet Kofu	2010	J2 League	31	20	1	0	–		–		–		32	20
Ventforet Kofu	2011	J1 League	32	17	–		2	1	–		–		34	18
Vitesse	2011–12	Eredivisie	15	5	1	0	–		–		2	0	18	5
Vitesse	2012–13	Eredivisie	32	11	3	1	–		3	0	–		38	12
Vitesse	2013–14	Eredivisie	32	10	2	0	–		1	0	2	0	37	10
Córdoba	2014–15	La Liga	5	0	0	0	–		–		0	0	5	0
HJK Helsinki	2015	Veikkausliiga	20	4	1	1	2	2	4	1	–		27	8
ADO Den Haag	2015–16	Eredivisie	31	16	1	1	0	0	0	0	0	0	32	17
ADO Den Haag	2016–17	Eredivisie	29	9	2	1	0	0	0	0	0	0	31	10
Vissel Kobe	2017	J1 League	9	4	2	1	2	0	–		–		13	5
Vissel Kobe	2018	J1 League	4	1	0	0	5	1	–		–		9	2
Vegalta Sendai (loan)	2018	J1 League	6	1	2	0	0	0	0	0	0	0	8	1
Bangkok United (loan)	2019	Thai League 1	7	3	0	0	1	1	0	0	0	0	8	4
Career total			338	123	17	7	21	7	8	1	4	0	388	138

=== International ===
As of 24 March 2016

Appearances and goals by national team and year
National team	Year	Apps	Goals
Japan	2011	5	2
Japan	2012	4	1
Japan	2013	8	1
Japan	2014	0	0
Japan	2015	0	0
Japan	2016	1	0
Total		18	4

Scores and results list Japan's goal tally first, score column indicates score after each Havenaar goal.

List of international goals scored by Mike Havenaar
No.	Date	Venue	Opponent	Score	Result	Competition
1	11 October 2011	Nagai Stadium, Osaka, Japan	Tajikistan	1–0	8–0	2014 FIFA World Cup qualification
2	11 October 2011	Nagai Stadium, Osaka, Japan	Tajikistan	5–0	8–0	2014 FIFA World Cup qualification
3	6 September 2012	Tohoku Denryoku Big Swan Stadium, Niigata, Japan	United Arab Emirates	1–0	1–0	Friendly
4	23 March 2013	Khalifa International Stadium, Doha, Qatar	Canada	2–1	2–1	Friendly

== Honors ==
HJK Helsinki

- Finnish League Cup: 2015
