= 2009 in Japanese football =

2009 season

Japanese football in 2009

== J.League Division 1 ==
Pos	Team	Pld	W	D	L	GF	GA	GD	Pts	Qualification or relegation
1	Kashima Antlers (C)	34	20	6	8	51	30	+21	66	Qualification for 2010 AFC Champions League group stage (Note: Sanfrecce Hiroshima received fourth Japanese berth in the group stage of the 2010 AFC Champions League because Gamba Osaka, the winners of the 2009 Emperor's Cup, had been already qualified for ACL through J.League championship.)
2	Kawasaki Frontale	34	19	7	8	64	40	+24	64	Qualification for 2010 AFC Champions League group stage
3	Gamba Osaka	34	18	6	10	62	44	+18	60	Qualification for 2010 AFC Champions League group stage
4	Sanfrecce Hiroshima	34	15	11	8	53	44	+9	56	Qualification for 2010 AFC Champions League group stage
5	FC Tokyo	34	16	5	13	47	39	+8	53	
6	Urawa Red Diamonds	34	16	4	14	43	43	0	52	
7	Shimizu S-Pulse	34	13	12	9	44	41	+3	51	
8	Albirex Niigata	34	13	11	10	42	31	+11	50	
9	Nagoya Grampus	34	14	8	12	46	42	+4	50	
10	Yokohama F. Marinos	34	11	13	10	43	37	+6	46	
11	Júbilo Iwata	34	11	8	15	50	60	−10	41	
12	Kyoto Sanga	34	11	8	15	35	47	−12	41	
13	Omiya Ardija	34	9	12	13	40	47	−7	39	
14	Vissel Kobe	34	10	9	15	40	48	−8	39	
15	Montedio Yamagata	34	10	9	15	32	40	−8	39	
16	Kashiwa Reysol (R)	34	7	13	14	41	57	−16	34	Relegation to 2010 J.League Division 2
17	Oita Trinita (R)	34	8	6	20	26	45	−19	30	Relegation to 2010 J.League Division 2
18	JEF United Chiba (R)	34	5	12	17	32	56	−24	27	Relegation to 2010 J.League Division 2

Updated to match(es) played on December 5, 2009. Source: J.League Division 1
Rules for classification: 1) points; 2) goal difference; 3) number of goals scored.
(C) Champions; (R) Relegated

== J.League Division 2 ==
Pos	Team	Pld	W	D	L	GF	GA	GD	Pts	Promotion
1	Vegalta Sendai (C, P)	51	32	10	9	87	39	+48	106	Promotion to 2010 J. League Division 1
2	Cerezo Osaka (P)	51	31	11	9	100	53	+47	104	Promotion to 2010 J. League Division 1
3	Shonan Bellmare (P)	51	29	11	11	84	52	+32	98	Promotion to 2010 J. League Division 1
4	Ventforet Kofu	51	28	13	10	76	46	+30	97	
5	Sagan Tosu	51	25	13	13	71	51	+20	88	
6	Consadole Sapporo	51	21	16	14	74	61	+13	79	
7	Tokyo Verdy	51	21	11	19	68	61	+7	74	
8	Mito HollyHock	51	21	10	20	70	79	−9	73	
9	Tokushima Vortis	51	19	15	17	67	52	+15	72	
10	Thespa Kusatsu	51	18	11	22	64	76	−12	65	
11	Avispa Fukuoka	51	17	14	20	52	71	−19	65	
12	FC Gifu	51	16	14	21	62	72	−10	62	
13	Kataller Toyama	51	15	16	20	48	58	−10	61	
14	Roasso Kumamoto	51	16	10	25	66	82	−16	58	
15	Ehime FC	51	12	11	28	54	80	−26	47	
16	Yokohama FC	51	11	11	29	43	70	−27	44	
17	Tochigi SC	51	8	13	30	38	77	−39	37	
18	Fagiano Okayama	51	8	12	31	40	84	−44	36	

Updated to match(es) played on December 5, 2009. Source: J.League Division 2
Rules for classification: 1) points; 2) goal difference; 3) number of goals scored.
(C) Champions; (P) Promoted

== Japan Football League ==
Pos	Team	Pld	W	D	L	GF	GA	GD	Pts	Promotion or relegation
1	Sagawa Shiga (Note: Occupied one of the top 4 places at the end of the first half of the season (17th week) and were seeded for 2009 Emperor's Cup. These clubs were automatically qualified for the tournament, while each of other JFL clubs had to go through the prefectural qualifier.) (C)	34	19	9	6	62	36	+26	66	
2	Yokogawa Musashino	34	17	9	8	48	34	+14	60	
3	Sony Sendai	34	17	8	9	49	30	+19	59	
4	New Wave Kitakyushu (Note: J. League Associate Membership and submitted applications to J. League board by 30 September.) (P)	34	16	10	8	49	31	+18	58	Promotion to 2010 J. League Division 2 (Note: Must hold J. League Associate Membership and submit applications to J. League board by 30 September, finish no less than in fourth place and pass a final inspection by J. League to be promoted. V-Varen Nagasaki and Machida Zelvia, both associate members, announced that they would not submit applications for this year due to some unresolved problems pointed out by J. League at the preliminary review.)
5	Gainare Tottori	34	16	8	10	65	37	+28	56	
6	Machida Zelvia	34	14	12	8	38	30	+8	54	
7	Honda FC	34	13	12	9	49	38	+11	51	
8	MIO Biwako Kusatsu	34	13	9	12	51	43	+8	48	
9	SP Kyoto	34	14	5	15	56	46	+10	47	
10	TDK SC	34	14	4	16	39	54	−15	46	
11	V-Varen Nagasaki	34	12	8	14	38	43	−5	44	
12	JEF Reserves	34	9	14	11	26	37	−11	41	
13	Honda Lock	34	9	13	12	34	38	−4	40	
14	Arte Takasaki	34	9	13	12	34	46	−12	40	
15	Ryutsu Keizai University	34	11	7	16	41	55	−14	40	
16	FC Ryukyu	34	11	5	18	42	57	−15	38	
17	FC Kariya (R)	34	7	10	17	26	51	−25	31	Promotion/relegation Series (Note: Series' occurrence is dependent on the number of places available after promotions to J2.)
18	Mitsubishi Motors Mizushima (R)	34	4	6	24	28	69	−41	18	Relegation to Okayama prefectural league (Note: Mitsubishi Mizushima F.C. submitted a letter to JFL headquarters on 30 September regarding withdrawal from JFL by the end of 2009 season regardless of their 2009 results due to "various factors including recent economic slump." However, Chugoku Soccer League, one of nine Japanese Regional Leagues, declined to accept Mizushima as its 2010 league member because of their voluntary withdrawal from JFL. Therefore, the highest division which Mizushima will be able to play in 2010 season is Okayama prefectural league division 1.)

Updated to match(es) played on November 29, 2009. Source: Japan Football League
Rules for classification: 1) points; 2) goal difference; 3) number of goals scored.
(C) Champions; (P) Promoted; (R) Relegated

== National team (Men) ==
=== Results ===
2009.01.20	Japan	2–1	Yemen	Kumamoto, Japan
	Okazaki 7'; Tanaka 66'	JFA	? (?)	Stadium: Kumamoto Athletics Stadium; Attendance: 30,654

2009.01.28	Japan	0–1	Bahrain	Manama, Bahrain
		JFA	? (?)	Attendance: 11,200

2009.02.04	Japan	5–1	Finland	Tokyo, Japan
	Okazaki 15', 32'; Kagawa 44'; Nakazawa 57'; Yasuda 86'	JFA	? (?)	Stadium: Tokyo National Stadium; Attendance: 34,532

2009.02.11	Japan	0–0	Australia	Kanagawa, Japan
		JFA		Stadium: International Stadium Yokohama; Attendance: 65,571

2009.03.28	Japan	1–0	Bahrain	Saitama, Japan
	S. Nakamura 47'	JFA		Stadium: Saitama Stadium 2002; Attendance: 57,276

2009.05.27	Japan	4–0	Chile	Osaka, Japan
	Okazaki 20', 24'; Abe 52'; Honda 90'	JFA		Stadium: Osaka Nagai Stadium; Attendance: 43,531

2009.05.31	Japan	4–0	Belgium	Tokyo, Japan
	Nagatomo 21'; K. Nakamura 23'; Okazaki 60'; Yano 77'	JFA		Stadium: Tokyo National Stadium; Attendance: 42,520

2009.06.06	Japan	1–0	Uzbekistan	Toshkent, Uzbekistan
	Okazaki 9'	JFA		Attendance: 34,000

2009.06.10	Japan	1–1	Qatar	Kanagawa, Japan
	2' (o.g.)	JFA	? (?)	Stadium: International Stadium Yokohama; Attendance: 60,256

2009.06.17	Japan	1–2	Australia	Melbourne, Australia
	Tulio 39'	JFA	? (?) ? (?)	Attendance: 69,238

2009.09.05	Japan	0–3	Netherlands	Enschede, Netherlands
		JFA	? (?) ? (?) ? (?)

2009.09.09	Japan	4–3	Ghana	Utrecht, Netherlands
	K. Nakamura 53'; Tamada 78'; Okazaki 79'; Inamoto 83'	JFA	? (?) ? (?) ? (?)

2009.10.08	Japan	6–0	Hong Kong	Shizuoka, Japan
	Okazaki 18', 75', 78'; Nagatomo 29'; Nakazawa 51'; Tulio 67'	JFA		Stadium: Nihondaira Sports Stadium; Attendance: 16,028

2009.10.10	Japan	2–0	Scotland	Kanagawa, Japan
	82' (o.g.); Honda 90'	JFA		Stadium: International Stadium Yokohama; Attendance: 61,285

2009.10.14	Japan	5–0	Togo	Miyagi, Japan
	Okazaki 5', 8', 65'; Morimoto 11'; Honda 85'	JFA		Stadium: Miyagi Stadium; Attendance: 32,852

2009.11.14	Japan	0–0	South Africa	Port Elizabeth, South Africa
		JFA

2009.11.18	Japan	4–0	Hong Kong	Hong Kong
	Hasebe 32'; Satō 74'; S. Nakamura 84'; Okazaki 89'	JFA		Attendance: 13,254

=== Players statistics ===
Player	-2008	01.20	01.28	02.04	02.11	03.28	05.27	05.31	06.06	06.10	06.17	09.05	09.09	10.08	10.10	10.14	11.14	11.18	2009	Total
Shunsuke Nakamura	82(22)	-	-	-	O	O(1)	-	O	O	O	-	O	O	O	-	O	O	O(1)	11(2)	93(24)
Yuji Nakazawa	82(15)	-	O	O(1)	O	O	O	O	O	O	-	O	O	O(1)	-	O	O	O	14(2)	96(17)
Yasuhito Endō	73(7)	-	-	O	O	O	O	O	O	-	-	O	O	O	-	O	O	O	12(0)	85(7)
Junichi Inamoto	70(4)	-	O	-	-	-	-	-	-	-	-	-	O(1)	-	O	-	O	-	4(1)	74(5)
Seigo Narazaki	63(0)	-	-	-	-	O	O	O	O	O	O	-	-	-	-	-	-	-	6(0)	69(0)
Keiji Tamada	53(13)	-	O	O	O	O	O	-	-	O	O	O	O(1)	O	-	-	-	-	10(1)	63(14)
Yūichi Komano	40(0)	O	-	O	-	-	O	-	O	-	-	-	O	O	O	-	O	O	9(0)	49(0)
Seiichiro Maki	35(8)	O	O	O	-	-	-	-	-	-	-	-	-	-	-	-	-	-	3(0)	38(8)
Yoshito Ōkubo	33(5)	-	-	-	O	O	-	O	O	-	-	-	-	O	O	O	O	O	9(0)	42(5)
Yuki Abe	33(2)	-	-	-	-	-	O(1)	O	O	O	O	-	O	-	O	-	-	O	8(1)	41(3)
Kengo Nakamura	29(3)	O	O	O	-	-	O	O(1)	O	O	O	O	O(1)	-	O	O	-	-	12(2)	41(5)
Yasuyuki Konno	26(0)	-	-	O	-	-	O	-	-	O	O	-	-	-	O	O	O	-	7(0)	33(0)
Hisato Satō	25(3)	-	-	-	-	-	-	-	-	-	-	-	-	O	-	O	-	O(1)	3(1)	28(4)
Marcus Tulio Tanaka	19(4)	-	-	O	O	O	-	O	O	O	O(1)	O	O	O(1)	-	O	O	O	13(2)	32(6)
Makoto Hasebe	16(0)	-	-	-	O	O	O	O	O	-	-	O	O	O	-	O	O	O(1)	11(1)	27(1)
Atsuto Uchida	14(1)	O	O	O	O	O	-	O	-	O	O	O	-	-	O	O	O	O	13(0)	27(1)
Daisuke Matsui	13(1)	-	-	-	O	O	-	-	-	O	O	-	-	O	O	-	O	O	8(0)	21(1)
Tatsuya Tanaka	12(2)	O(1)	O	-	O	O	-	-	-	-	-	-	-	-	-	-	-	-	4(1)	16(3)
Kisho Yano	12(1)	-	-	-	-	-	O	O(1)	O	-	O	-	-	-	-	-	-	-	4(1)	16(2)
Yuto Nagatomo	7(1)	-	O	O	O	O	-	O(1)	O	-	O	O	O	O(1)	-	O	-	-	11(2)	18(3)
Shinji Kagawa	6(1)	O	O	O(1)	-	-	O	-	-	-	-	-	-	-	-	-	-	-	4(1)	10(2)
Hideo Hashimoto	6(0)	-	-	O	-	O	O	O	-	O	O	-	-	-	O	-	-	-	7(0)	13(0)
Michihiro Yasuda	5(0)	-	-	O(1)	-	-	-	-	-	-	-	-	-	-	-	-	-	-	1(1)	6(1)
Shinji Okazaki	4(0)	O(1)	O	O(2)	O	O	O(2)	O(1)	O(1)	O	O	O	O(1)	O(3)	-	O(3)	O	O(1)	16(15)	20(15)
Shuhei Terada	4(0)	O	O	-	-	-	-	-	-	-	-	-	-	-	-	-	-	-	2(0)	6(0)
Ryoichi Maeda	3(2)	-	-	-	-	-	-	-	-	-	-	-	O	-	O	-	-	-	2(0)	5(2)
Ryōta Tsuzuki	3(0)	-	-	O	O	-	-	-	-	-	-	-	O	-	-	-	-	-	3(0)	6(0)
Kazumichi Takagi	3(0)	O	-	O	-	-	-	-	-	-	-	-	-	-	-	-	-	-	2(0)	5(0)
Shinzo Koroki	2(0)	O	O	-	-	-	-	O	-	O	O	O	O	-	-	-	O	-	8(0)	10(0)
Naohiro Ishikawa	2(0)	-	-	-	-	-	-	-	-	-	-	-	-	-	O	O	-	-	2(0)	4(0)
Keisuke Honda	1(0)	-	O	-	-	-	O(1)	O	O	O	-	O	O	-	O(1)	O(1)	O	-	10(3)	11(3)
Eiji Kawashima	1(0)	O	O	-	-	-	-	-	-	-	-	O	-	-	O	O	O	O	7(0)	8(0)
Takeshi Aoki	1(0)	O	-	-	-	-	-	-	-	-	-	-	-	-	-	-	-	-	1(0)	2(0)
Yuhei Tokunaga	0(0)	-	-	-	-	-	-	-	-	-	-	-	-	O	O	O	O	O	5(0)	5(0)
Takayuki Morimoto	0(0)	-	-	-	-	-	-	-	-	-	-	-	-	-	O	O(1)	-	-	2(1)	2(1)
Satoshi Yamaguchi	0(0)	-	-	-	-	-	O	O	-	-	-	-	-	-	-	-	-	-	2(0)	2(0)
Takashi Inui	0(0)	O	-	-	-	-	-	-	-	-	-	-	-	-	-	-	-	-	1(0)	1(0)
Mu Kanazaki	0(0)	O	-	-	-	-	-	-	-	-	-	-	-	-	-	-	-	-	1(0)	1(0)
Naoki Yamada	0(0)	-	-	-	-	-	O	-	-	-	-	-	-	-	-	-	-	-	1(0)	1(0)
Shusaku Nishikawa	0(0)	-	-	-	-	-	-	-	-	-	-	-	-	O	-	-	-	-	1(0)	1(0)
Daiki Iwamasa	0(0)	-	-	-	-	-	-	-	-	-	-	-	-	-	O	-	-	-	1(0)	1(0)

== National team (Women) ==
=== Results ===
2009.07.29	Japan	0–0	Germany	Germany

2009.08.01	Japan	4–0	France	France
	Ono (?); Ando (?); Kinga (?); Yamaguchi (?)

2009.11.14	Japan	2–1	New Zealand	Saitama, Japan
	Miyama (?); Ono (?)		? (?)	Stadium: Saitama Komaba Stadium

=== Players statistics ===
Player	-2008	07.29	08.01	11.14	2009	Total
Homare Sawa	145(72)	-	-	O	1(0)	146(72)
Nozomi Yamago	86(0)	-	O	O	2(0)	88(0)
Eriko Arakawa	68(20)	-	-	O	1(0)	69(20)
Aya Miyama	68(19)	-	-	O(1)	1(1)	69(20)
Kozue Ando	68(10)	O	O(1)	O	3(1)	71(11)
Shinobu Ono	65(25)	O	O(1)	O(1)	3(2)	68(27)
Karina Maruyama	58(13)	O	O	-	2(0)	60(13)
Yuki Nagasato	52(28)	O	O	O	3(0)	55(28)
Kyoko Yano	51(1)	-	-	O	1(0)	52(1)
Azusa Iwashimizu	41(5)	O	O	O	3(0)	44(5)
Yukari Kinga	37(1)	O	O(1)	O	3(1)	40(2)
Rumi Utsugi	26(4)	O	O	O	3(0)	29(4)
Yuka Miyazaki	17(2)	-	O	-	1(0)	18(2)
Nayuha Toyoda	17(0)	O	O	-	2(0)	19(0)
Ayako Kitamoto	9(3)	O	O	O	3(0)	12(3)
Ayumi Kaihori	3(0)	O	O	O	3(0)	6(0)
Aya Sameshima	2(1)	O	O	O	3(0)	5(1)
Nahomi Kawasumi	1(0)	O	O	-	2(0)	3(0)
Mami Yamaguchi	1(0)	-	O(1)	-	1(1)	2(1)
Asano Nagasato	0(0)	O	O	O	3(0)	3(0)
Miwa Yonetsu	0(0)	O	-	O	2(0)	2(0)
Maiko Nasu	0(0)	-	O	O	2(0)	2(0)
Megumi Kamionobe	0(0)	-	O	-	1(0)	1(0)
