= Ademir Candido =

Brazilian footballer (born 1995)

Personal information
- Full name: Ademir Candido de Sousa Neto
- Date of birth: 30 January 1995 (age 31)
- Place of birth: Diadema, Brazil
- Height: 1.79 m (5 ft 10 in)
- Position: Striker

Youth career
- 2012: Desportivo Brasil
- 2013: Ponte Preta

Senior career*
Years	Team	Apps	(Gls)
2014–2015	Ponte Preta	1	(0)
2014	→ Penapolense (loan)	3	(0)
2015	→ Cuiabá (loan)	0	(0)
2015–2016	Ituano	1	(0)
2015	→ HJK (loan)	2	(0)
2016	→ CRAC (loan)	0	(0)
- * Club domestic league appearances and goals as of 3 May 2017

Ademir Candido de Sousa Neto (born 30 January 1995) is a Brazilian footballer who plays as a striker, most recently for Brazilian side Ituano FC.

== Career ==
=== Club ===
On 31 August 2015, Candido joined Finnish Veikkausliiga club HJK on loan for the remainder of the 2015 season.
