= Ville Salmikivi =

Finnish footballer (born 1992)

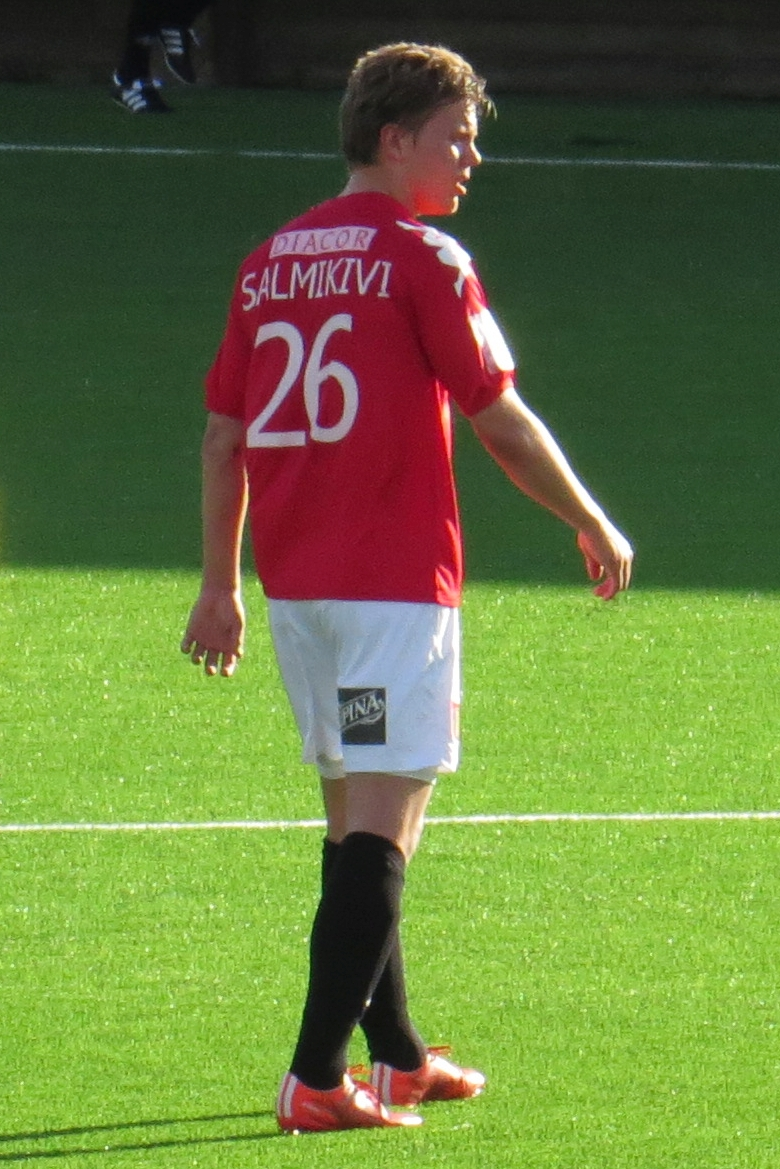
- Ville Salmikivi playing for HIFK in 2015

Personal information
- Date of birth: 20 May 1992 (age 34)
- Place of birth: Helsinki, Finland
- Height: 1.78 m (5 ft 10 in)
- Position: Striker

Youth career
- 1998–1999: HIFK
- 2000–2010: PK-35

Senior career*
Years	Team	Apps	(Gls)
2010	PK-35 Vantaa	2	(1)
2011–2012	Viikingit	49	(27)
2013–2014	MyPa	28	(6)
2014	→ Sudet (loan)	1	(1)
2015–2016	HIFK	49	(12)
2017	Beroe	14	(1)
2017–2018	Olimpia Grudziądz	12	(1)
2018	→ GKS Jastrzębie (loan)	10	(0)
2018–2019	Lahti	29	(0)
2020–2022	PK-35	39	(7)
- * Club domestic league appearances and goals as of 20 May 2024

Ville Salmikivi (born 20 May 1992) is a Finnish professional footballer who plays as a forward.

== Career ==
=== Youth career ===
Salmikivi begun playing football being five years old in HIFK. The youth organisation of HIFK was acquired by PK-35 in 2000, thus he played in PK-35 until the season 2010. He was selected as "The Boy Player of the Year" of the club in 2008.

=== Viikingit ===
Salmikivi didn't manage to break through to the first team of PK-35, therefore he moved to FC Viikingit for the season of 2011. In Viikingit he was the top goalscorer of the season 2011 in Ykkönen, scoring 20 goals. The accomplishment earned himself to be "The Footballer of the Season 2011 in Ykkönen", voted by the Federation of Finnish Footballers. During the season 2012, he scored seven times.

=== MyPa ===
For the season 2013, he transferred to MyPa. He made his league debut on 14 May 2013 in the opening match against KuPS. He continued to play for MyPa in 2014.

=== HIFK ===
For the season 2015, he made a contract with HIFK.

=== Beroe ===
On 3 February 2017 Salmikivi joined Beroe Stara Zagora of the Bulgarian First League. He made his debut in the league on February 17, scoring one goal for the 4–0 thrashing over Dunav Ruse at home. He left Beroe on 9 June 2017.

=== Olimpia Grudziądz ===
On 13 July 2017, Salmikivi signed with I liga side Olimpia Grudziądz. In 2018, he was loaned out to GKS Jastrzębie.

=== Return to Finland ===
Later he returned to Finland and played for FC Lahti and PK-35.

== Career statistics ==
As of 22 May 2024.

Appearances and goals by club, season and competition
Club	Season	League			Cup (Note: Includes Suomen Cup)		League cup (Note: Includes Finnish League Cup)		Continental		Total	
Club	Season	Division	Apps	Goals	Apps	Goals	Apps	Goals	Apps	Goals	Apps	Goals
PK-35 Vantaa	2010	Ykkönen	2	1	0	0	–		–		2	1
Viikingit	2011	Ykkönen	23	20	–		–		–		23	20
Viikingit	2012	Ykkönen	26	7	1	0	–		–		27	7
Viikingit	Total		49	27	1	0	–	–	–	–	50	27
MYPA	2013	Veikkausliiga	13	3	0	0	5	0	–		18	3
MYPA	2014	Veikkausliiga	15	3	1	0	1	0	4 (Note: Includes UEFA Europa League)	0	21	3
MYPA	Total		28	6	1	0	6	0	4	0	39	6
Sudet (loan)	2014	Kolmonen	1	1	–		–		–		1	1
HIFK	2015	Veikkausliiga	25	6	0	0	2	1	–		27	7
HIFK	2016	Veikkausliiga	24	6	2	1	4	1	–		30	8
HIFK	Total		49	12	2	1	6	2	–	–	57	15
Beroe	2016–17	Bulgarian First League	14	1	0	0	–		–		14	1
Olimpia Grudziądz	2017–18	I liga	12	1	1	0	–		–		13	1
GKS Jastrzębie (loan)	2017–18	II liga	10	0	–		–		–		10	0
Lahti	2018	Veikkausliiga	14	0	–		–		1	0	15	0
Lahti	2019	Veikkausliiga	15	0	6	0	–		–		21	0
Lahti	Total		29	0	6	0	–	–	1	0	36	0
PK-35	2020	Kakkonen	16	5	–		–		–		16	5
PK-35	2021	Ykkönen	15	1	4	1	–		–		19	2
PK-35	2022	Ykkönen	8	1	–		–		–		8	1
PK-35	Total		39	7	4	1	–	–	–	–	43	8
Career total			233	56	15	2	12	2	5	0	265	60

== Honours ==
GKS Jastrzębie

- II liga: 2017–18

Individual

- Ykkönen Player of the Month: August 2011
