= Formose Mendy (footballer, born 1989) =

Senegalese footballer

Personal information
- Date of birth: 23 March 1989 (age 37)
- Place of birth: Guédiawaye, Senegal
- Height: 1.81 m (5 ft 11 in)
- Position: Winger

Team information
- Current team: Mauerwerk
- Number: 7

Youth career
- Septème-les-Vallons
- Lyon
- Consolat
- Lens

Senior career*
| Years | Team | Apps | (Gls) |
| 2006–2009 | Lens B | 13 | (1) |
| 2008–2009 | → Istres (loan) | 1 | (0) |
| 2009–2010 | Puertollano | 14 | (0) |
| 2010–2012 | Sporting B | 42 | (4) |
| 2012–2014 | Sporting Gijón | 35 | (0) |
| 2014–2015 | Blackpool | 3 | (0) |
| 2015 | HJK | 13 | (2) |
| 2016 | Adana Demirspor | 4 | (0) |
| 2016–2017 | Alassiouty | | |
| 2017 | Raja | 5 | (0) |
| 2018 | Admira Landhaus | 10 | (1) |
| 2018– | Mauerwerk | 67 | (7) |

International career
| 2011 | Guinea-Bissau | 1 | (0) |
- * Club domestic league appearances and goals as of 19:38, 6 March 2023 (UTC)

Formose Mendy (born 23 March 1989) is a professional footballer who plays as a winger for Austrian club FC Mauerwerk.

He played club football in France, Spain, England, Finland, Egypt and Austria, for Lens, Istres, Puertollano, Sporting de Gijón, Blackpool, HJK, Adana Demirspor, Alassiouty, Raja, Admira Landhaus and Mauerwerk.

Born in Senegal, Mendy represented Guinea-Bissau at international level.

== Early and personal life ==
Mendy was born in Guédiawaye, Senegal to a father that had numerous wives and 25 children. He emigrated to Marseille, France, at the age of seven, to live with an aunt.

== Club career ==
=== France ===
Mendy played youth football for Septème-les-Vallons, Lyon, Consolat and Lens, and started his senior career in France with Lens B and Istres. After finishing his loan deal with the latter club, being part of the squad that won promotion to Ligue 2, he was released by the former.

=== Spain ===
Mendy arrived in Spain in the summer of 2009, signing for Puertollano in Segunda División B. After just one season he joined another team in the same division, Sporting de Gijón's reserve side.

Following a change of management at the Asturias team in 2012, Mendy was promoted to the main squad. He made his La Liga debut on 25 February 2012 in a 1–1 away draw against Racing de Santander, and added a further nine appearances (often as a starter) as the campaign ended in relegation; additionally, he scored four goals for the B's, who finished in tenth position in the third level.

=== England and Finland ===
On 29 September 2014, Mendy signed a season-long deal with Blackpool in the Football League Championship. On 20 April of the following year he joined Finnish club HJK Helsinki, scoring his first goal for his new team on 14 May in a 1–0 home victory over IFK Mariehamn, after entering as a substitute.

=== Later years ===
On 1 January 2016, Mendy signed a one-and-a-half-year contract with Adana Demirspor in the Turkish TFF First League. He competed in Egyptian football in the following years, first with Alassiouty in the Second Division then Raja in the Premier League.

== International career ==
As his grandfather hailed from the country, Mendy chose to represent Guinea-Bissau internationally, making his debut on 7 February 2011 against Gambia.
