= Henry Chidozie Ugwunna =

Nigerian football forward

Henry Ugwunna
Personal information
- Full name: Henry Chidozie Ugwunna
- Date of birth: 9 May 1989 (age 37)
- Place of birth: Imo State, Nigeria
- Height: 1.82 m (6 ft 0 in)
- Position: Forward

Team information
- Current team: Abia Warriors

Senior career*
Years	Team	Apps	(Gls)
2011–2012	Cruzeiro-RS	3	(1)
2012	Arapiraquense	3	(0)
2013	Clube de Regatas Brasil	5	(0)
2013–2014	Haaglandia	13	(8)
2014–2015	FC Haka	21	(4)
2015	Ilves	4	(1)
2016–2018	Westlandia	6	(1)
2023–	Abia Warriors	7	(0)
- * Club domestic league appearances and goals as of 11:31, 14 November 2024 (UTC)

Henry Chidozie Ugwunna (born 9 May 1989) is a Nigerian footballer who plays as a forward for Abia Warriors. He also holds Finnish citizenship.

== Club career ==
In February 2015, Ugwunna joined the Finnish Veikkausliiga club FC Ilves.
