= Emenike Uchenna Mbachu =

Nigerian footballer (born 1989)

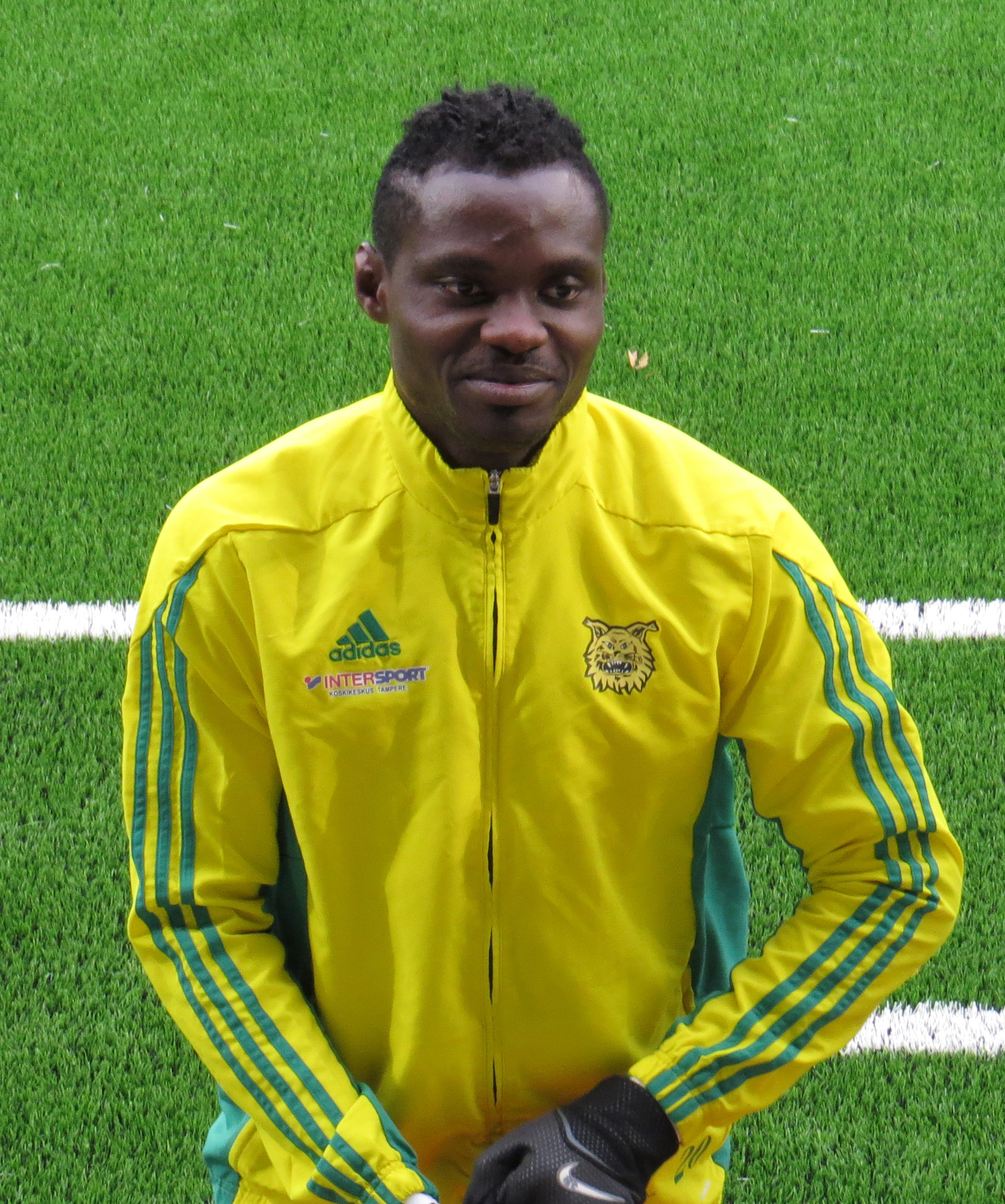

Personal information
- Date of birth: 21 May 1989 (age 37)
- Place of birth: Lagos, Nigeria
- Height: 1.80 m (5 ft 11 in)
- Position: Left winger

Team information
- Current team: Pallo-Iirot
- Number: 27

Youth career
- FC Goal International Lagos

Senior career*
Years	Team	Apps	(Gls)
2011	PS Kemi	9	(6)
2012–2014	RoPS	67	(9)
2014	→ Santa Claus (loan)	1	(1)
2014–2015	Naxxar Lions	17	(4)
2015	FC Ilves	27	(1)
2016–2017	FC Haka	51	(9)
2018–	Pallo-Iirot	?	(?)
- * Club domestic league appearances and goals as of 30 May 2018

Emenike Uchenna Mbachu (born 21 May 1989 in Lagos), also known as Epeleje, is a Nigerian footballer who plays as a winger for Pallo-Iirot.

In the middle of the season in 2011, he came from Nigeria to join PS Kemi in the Ykkönen. He changed clubs after the first season as PS Kemi was relegated and continued to play in Ykkönen another year. During his shortened first season in Finland, he played 9 matches and scored 6 goals.

At RoPS, Emenike joined fellow Nigerians, central defenders Nduka Alison and Faith Friday Obilor. During the 2012 season, Emenike scored 6 goals, while RoPS came first in the league, gaining promotion to the Veikkausliiga.

== Honours ==
- Ykkönen Champion: 2012
