= Joachim Böckerman =

Finnish footballer (born 1997)

Personal information
- Date of birth: 24 July 1997 (age 29)
- Place of birth: Espoo, Finland
- Height: 1.71 m (5 ft 7 in)
- Position: Right back

Youth career
- –2007: KyIF
- 2008–2014: HJK

Senior career*
Years	Team	Apps	(Gls)
2014–2016	Klubi-04	35	(0)
2015	HJK	2	(0)
2017	FC Honka	2	(0)
2018	FC Kiffen 08	6	(0)
2019	Ekenäs IF	0	(0)
- * Club domestic league appearances and goals as of 31 May 2018

Joachim Böckerman (born 24 July 1997) is a Finnish football player.

== Club career ==
He made his professional debut in the Veikkausliiga for HJK on 13 September 2015 in a game against FF Jaro.
