= Nnaemeka Anyamele =

Finnish footballer (born 1994)

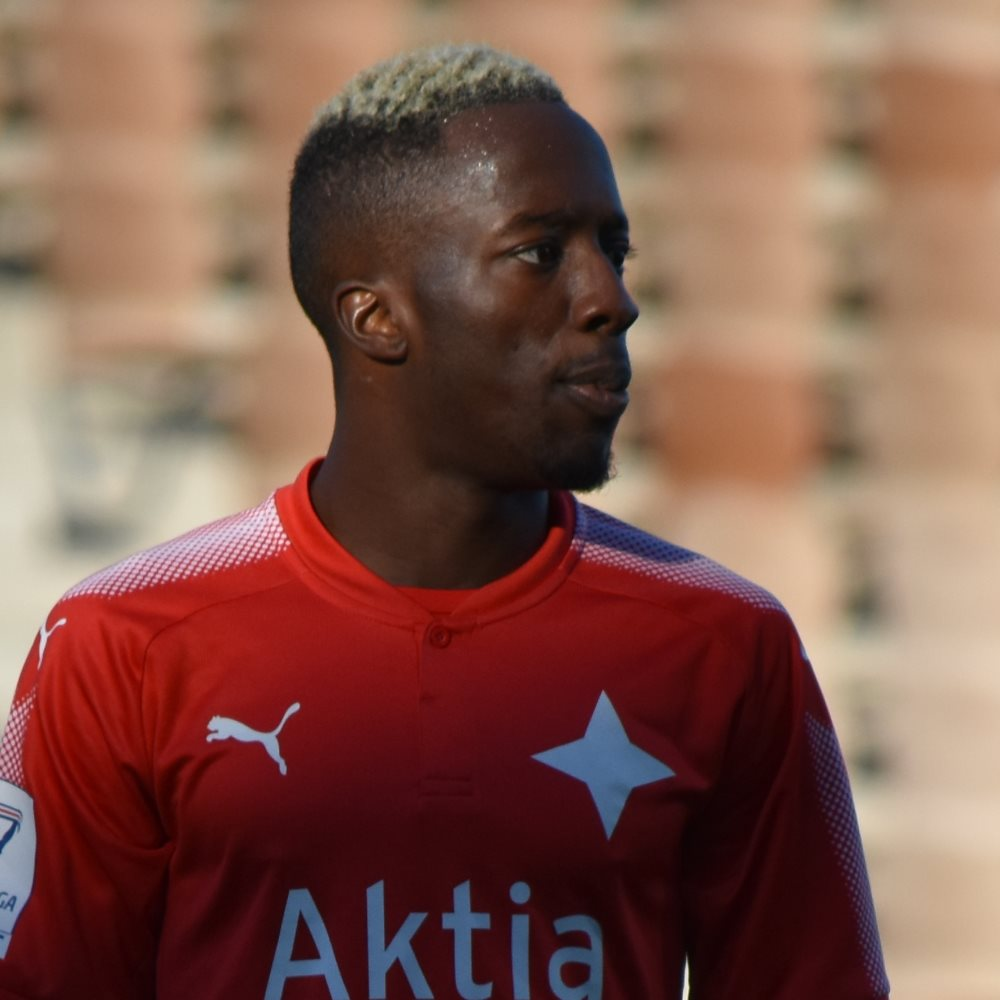

Personal information
- Date of birth: 16 May 1994 (age 32)
- Place of birth: Tornio, Finland
- Height: 1.75 m (5 ft 9 in)
- Positions: Left-back; winger

Youth career
- 2006–2007: Helsingin Ponnistus
- 2008–2011: HJK

Senior career*
Years	Team	Apps	(Gls)
2011–2012	Klubi-04	25	(2)
2013–2014	Honka	43	(5)
2013	→ Pallohonka (loan)	6	(0)
2014–2017	HIFK	71	(2)
2016	→ Gnistan (loan)	1	(0)
2018–2019	Schwarz-Weiß Rehden	16	(0)
2020–2021	Gnistan	35	(4)
2022	HIFK	0	(0)
2022	EIF	18	(0)
Total		215	(13)

International career
2009	Finland U15	1	(0)
2013	Finland U19	2	(0)
2014	Finland U20	2	(0)
2014–2016	Finland U21	12	(0)
- * Club domestic league appearances and goals as of 8 October 2022

Nnaemeka Anyamele (born 16 May 1994) is a Finnish footballer who plays as a left-back or winger. He has previously played for Klubi-04, FC Honka, Pallohonka, HIFK, Gnistan and EIF.

== Club career ==
Anyamele spent his youth with Helsingin Ponnistus and HJK, before he joined Klubi-04. He made his Kakkonen debut with Klubi on 4 August 2011, coming on as a half-time substitute for Henri Lassila in a 5–0 win over Sudet at the Sonera Stadium. He made four further appearances in the 2011 season, before scoring two goals in 20 appearances in the 2012 campaign. He scored his first goal in senior football on 21 April 2012, in a 6–0 home win over LoPa.

He joined Mika Lehkosuo's FC Honka of the Veikkausliiga for the 2013 season, and was loaned out to Pallohonka back in the Kakkonen. Honka finished as runners-up to HJK, with Anyamele scoring one goal in 12 league games. He won a regular first team place under new manager Shefki Kuqi during the 2014 campaign, scoring five goals in 37 games as the club were relegated in 11th-place. He also played twice in the UEFA Europa League, featuring in both legs of the club's 3–2 aggregate victory over Estonian side Sillamäe Kalev. Anyamele signed a two-year contract with HIFK in November 2014, and said that manager Jani Honkavaara's promise to play him at left-back convinced him to join the club. He spent the 2015 and 2016 seasons at the club, scoring three goals in 53 games.

On 27 January 2022, Anyamele returned to HIFK. On 29 March 2022 his contract with HIFK was terminated. On the next day, Anyamele signed with EIF in Ykkönen.

== International career ==
Anyamele is of Nigerian descent, but has represented Finland at youth-team level.

== Statistics ==
As of 24 November 2016.

Club	Season	Division	League		National Cup		League Cup		Other		Total	
Club	Season	Division	Apps	Goals	Apps	Goals	Apps	Goals	Apps	Goals	Apps	Goals
Klubi-04	2011	Kakkonen Group A	5	0	0	0	0	0	0	0	5	0
Klubi-04	2012	Kakkonen	20	2	0	0	0	0	0	0	20	2
Klubi-04	Total		25	2	0	0	0	0	0	0	25	2
Pallohonka (loan)	2013	Kakkonen	6	0	0	0	0	0	0	0	6	0
FC Honka	2013	Veikkausliiga	12	1	0	0	2	0	0	0	14	1
FC Honka	2014	Veikkausliiga	31	4	1	0	5	1	2 (Note: Appearances in UEFA Europa League)	0	39	5
FC Honka	Total		43	5	1	0	7	1	2	0	53	6
HIFK	2015	Veikkausliiga	21	1	1	0	4	1	0	0	26	2
HIFK	2016	Veikkausliiga	22	1	0	0	5	0	0	0	27	1
HIFK	Total		43	2	1	0	9	1	0	0	53	3
IF Gnistan	2016	Kakkonen	1	0	0	0	0	0	0	0	1	0
Career total			118	9	2	0	16	1	2	0	138	10

== Honours ==
with FC Honka

- Veikkausliiga runner-up: 2013
