= Hassan Mila Sesay =

Sierra Leonean footballer

Hassan Sesay
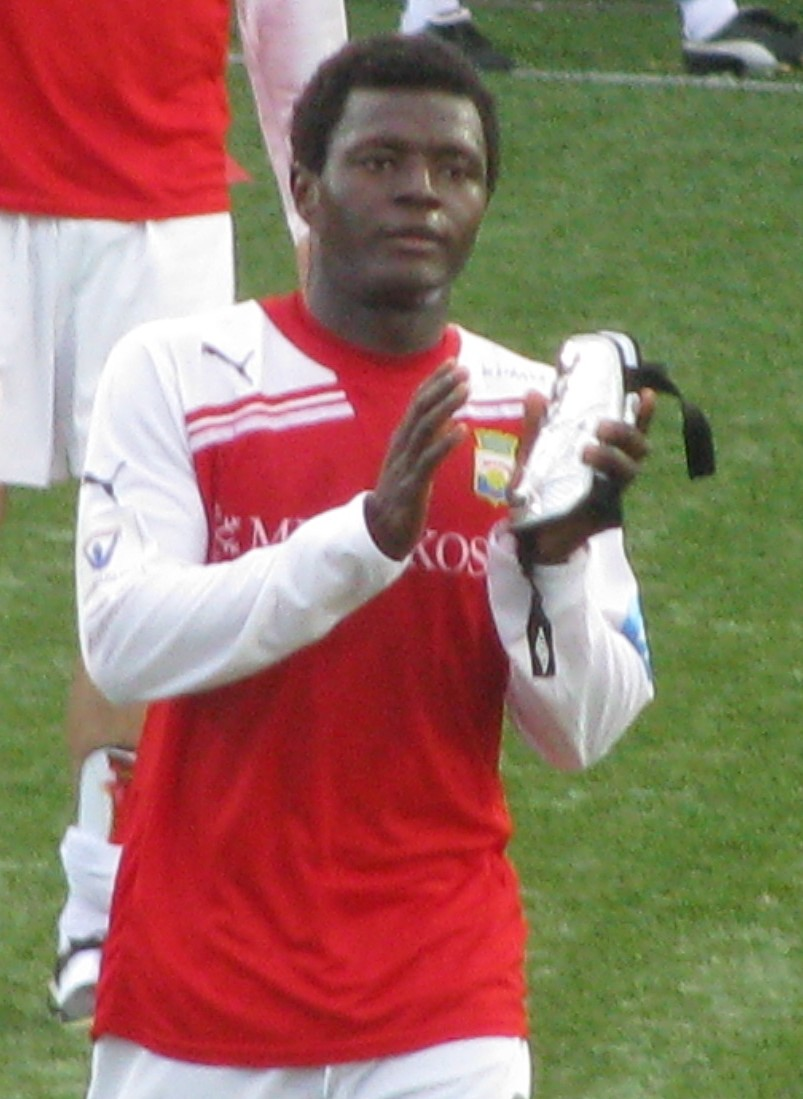

Personal information
- Full name: Hassan Mila Sesay
- Date of birth: 22 October 1987 (age 39)
- Place of birth: Freetown, Sierra Leone
- Height: 1.74 m (5 ft 8 1/2 in)
- Position: Left back

Youth career
- –2002: Mighty Blackpool SC
- 2003–2006: Ports Authority

Senior career*
Years	Team	Apps	(Gls)
2003–2006	Ports Authority		
2006	Klubi-04	16	(0)
2007	Atlantis	20	(3)
2008	KuPS	17	(1)
2009	Örebro	0	(0)
2010–2011	Viikingit	37	(7)
2011	→ MYPA (loan)	9	(1)
2012–2013	MYPA	54	(3)
2014–2018	FC Lahti	125	(6)
2019	HIFK	20	(1)
2020	Gnistan	12	(0)
2022	JäPS	12	(0)

International career
2001–2003	Sierra Leone U-17	9	(3)
2006–	Sierra Leone	12	(0)
- * Club domestic league appearances and goals as of 8 October 2022

Hassan Mila Sesay (born 22 October 1987) is a Sierra Leonean international footballer, playing as a left back.

== International ==
He played also for the Sierra Leone national football team. Sesay was a member of Sierra Leone U-17 team at the 2003 FIFA U-17 World Championship in Finland.

== Clubs ==
- 2003–06 Ports Authority F.C. (Sierra Leone)
- 2006 Klubi-04 (Finland)
- 2007 Atlantis FC (Finland)
- 2008 Kuopion Palloseura (Finland)
- 2009 Örebro SK (Sweden)
- 2010–11 FC Viikingit (Finland)
- 2011–2013 MYPA (Finland)
- 2014–2018 FC Lahti (Finland)
- 2019 HIFK (Finland)
- 2020 IF Gnistan (Finland)
- 2022 Järvenpään Palloseura (Finland)
