= Miwa Yonetsu =

Japanese footballer

Miwa Yonetsu 米津 美和
Personal information
- Full name: Miwa Yonetsu
- Date of birth: December 4, 1979 (age 46)
- Place of birth: Osaka, Japan
- Height: 1.58 m (5 ft 2 in)
- Position: Forward

Youth career
- 1995–1997: Ibaraki Nishi High School
- 1998–1999: Himeji Gakuin Women's Junior College

Senior career*
Years	Team	Apps	(Gls)
2000–2003	Toyotsu Ladies FC		
2004–2011	INAC Kobe Leonessa	129	(62)
Total		129	(62)

International career
2009	Japan	2	(0)
Medal record
INAC Kobe Leonessa
Winner	Nadeshiko League	2011
Runner-up	Nadeshiko League	2008
Winner	Empress's Cup	2010
Winner	Empress's Cup	2011
Runner-up	Empress's Cup	2008
- * Club domestic league appearances and goals

Miwa Yonetsu (米津 美和, Yonetsu Miwa; born December 4, 1979) is a former Japanese football player. She played for Japan national team.

== Club career ==
Yonetsu was born in Osaka Prefecture on December 4, 1979. After graduating from Himeji Gakuin Women's Junior College, she joined her local club Toyotsu Ladies FC in 2000. In 2004, she moved to L.League club INAC Leonessa (later INAC Kobe Leonessa). She retired end of 2011 season.

== National team career ==
On July 29, 2009, when Yonetsu was 29 years old, she debuted for Japan national team against Germany. She played 2 games for Japan in 2009.

== National team statistics ==
Japan national team
Year	Apps	Goals
2009	2	0
Total	2	0
