= Ridvan Zeneli =

Albanian-born Finnish footballer (born 1979)

Personal information
- Date of birth: 10 March 1979 (age 47)
- Place of birth: Gjakova, Kosovo, SFR Yugoslavia
- Height: 1.65 m (5 ft 5 in)
- Position: Midfielder

Senior career*
Years	Team	Apps	(Gls)
1996–1997	RoPS	11	(0)
1998–2002	Jaro	32	(5)
2003–2005	HJK	51	(5)
- * Club domestic league appearances and goals

Ridvan Zeneli is an Albanian former footballer who played as a midfielder. During his playing career in Finland, Zeneli played for RoPS, FF Jaro and HJK Helsinki in top-tier Veikkausliiga, totalling 94 appearances and scoring 10 goals. In the 2003 season when playing for HJK, they won the Finnish championship title and the Finnish Cup.

Zeneli was born in Gjakova, Kosovo, then part of Socialist Federal Republic of Yugoslavia. He moved to Finland at a young age. His younger brother Erfan is also a former footballer. He holds Finnish citizenship.

== Honours ==
HJK

- Veikkausliiga: 2003
- Finnish Cup: 2003
