= Himeji Gakuin Women's Junior College =

- 姫路学院女子短期大学
- Type: Private women's junior college
- Active: 1973–2001
- Academic staff: Preschool education, English communication
- Location: Fukusaki, Hyōgo, Japan

Himeji Gakuin Women's Junior College (姫路学院女子短期大学, Himeji Gakuin Joshi Tanki Daigaku) was a private junior college in Fukusaki, Hyōgo, Japan.

== History ==
The college was founded in 1973 with two academic departments. It closed in 2001.

== Courses offered ==
- Preschool education
- English communication

== See also ==
- List of junior colleges in Japan
