= Valeri Minkenen =

Finnish footballer (born 1989)

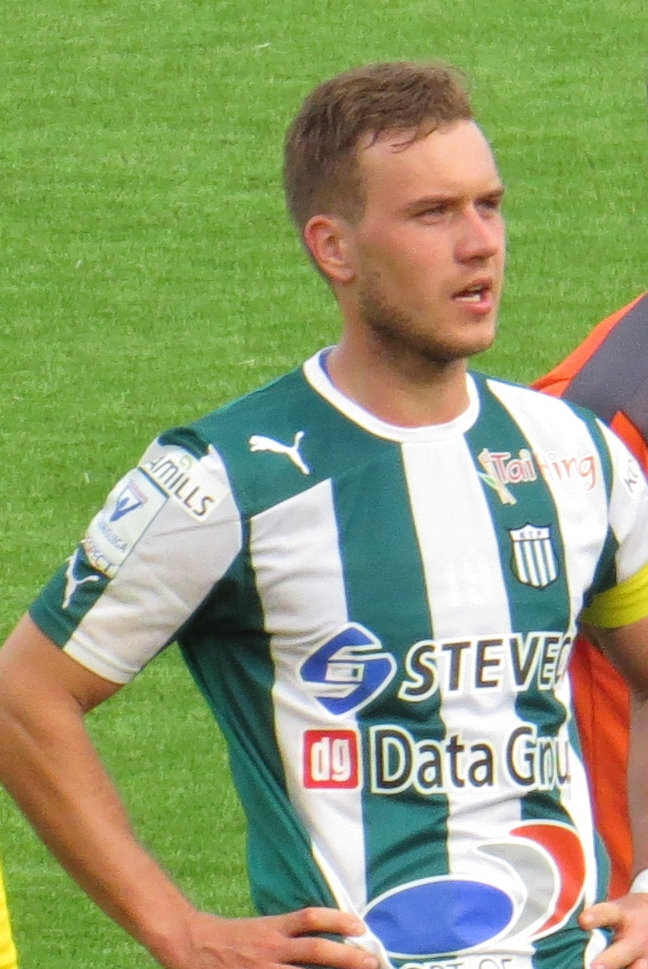

Personal information
- Date of birth: 9 April 1989 (age 37)
- Place of birth: Leningrad, Soviet Union
- Height: 1.84 m (6 ft 1/2 in)
- Position: Midfielder

Senior career*
Years	Team	Apps	(Gls)
2007	AC Oulu	10	(0)
2008–2009	FC Haka	24	(2)
2010–2012	Flora Tallinn	96	(25)
2013	KTP	25	(8)
2014	MyPa	16	(2)
2014–2016	KTP	52	(2)
2017	Klubi 04	23	(14)
- * Club domestic league appearances and goals

Valeri Minkenen (born 9 April 1989) is a Finnish retired professional footballer.

== Early life and career ==
Minkenen was born in Leningrad, and he is of Ingrian Finnish descent. He has played in Finland and Estonia for AC Oulu, FC Haka, FC Flora Tallinn and KTP.
