= Ville Koskimaa =

Finnish footballer (born 1983)

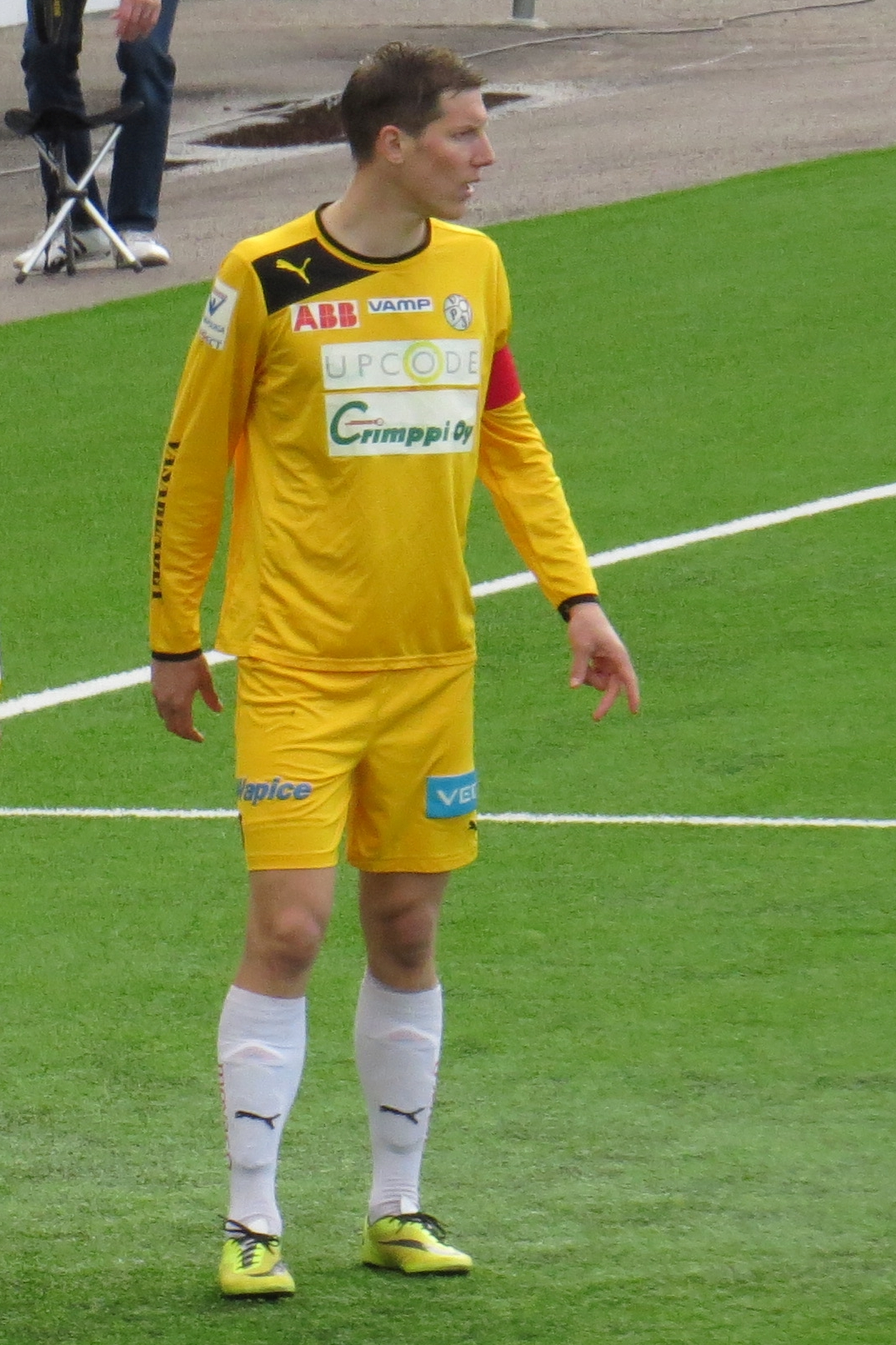
- Ville Koskimaa in 2015

Personal information
- Date of birth: 21 May 1983 (age 43)
- Place of birth: Vaasa, Finland
- Height: 1.92 m (6 ft 4 in)
- Position: Centre back

Youth career
- 1995–2001: Kiisto

Senior career*
Years	Team	Apps	(Gls)
2000–2004	Kiisto	61	(11)
2005–2008	VPS	86	(0)
2009–2010	Honka	20	(3)
2009	→ Pallohonka (loan)	1	(0)
2011–2017	VPS	188	(7)
2012	→ Kiisto (loan)	1	(0)
2018–2019	KPV	50	(1)
2020	VPS	19	(1)
- * Club domestic league appearances and goals as of 17 May 2018

Ville Koskimaa (born 21 May 1983) is a Finnish former professional footballer.
