= Erfan Zeneli =

Finnish footballer of Kosovar Albanian descent

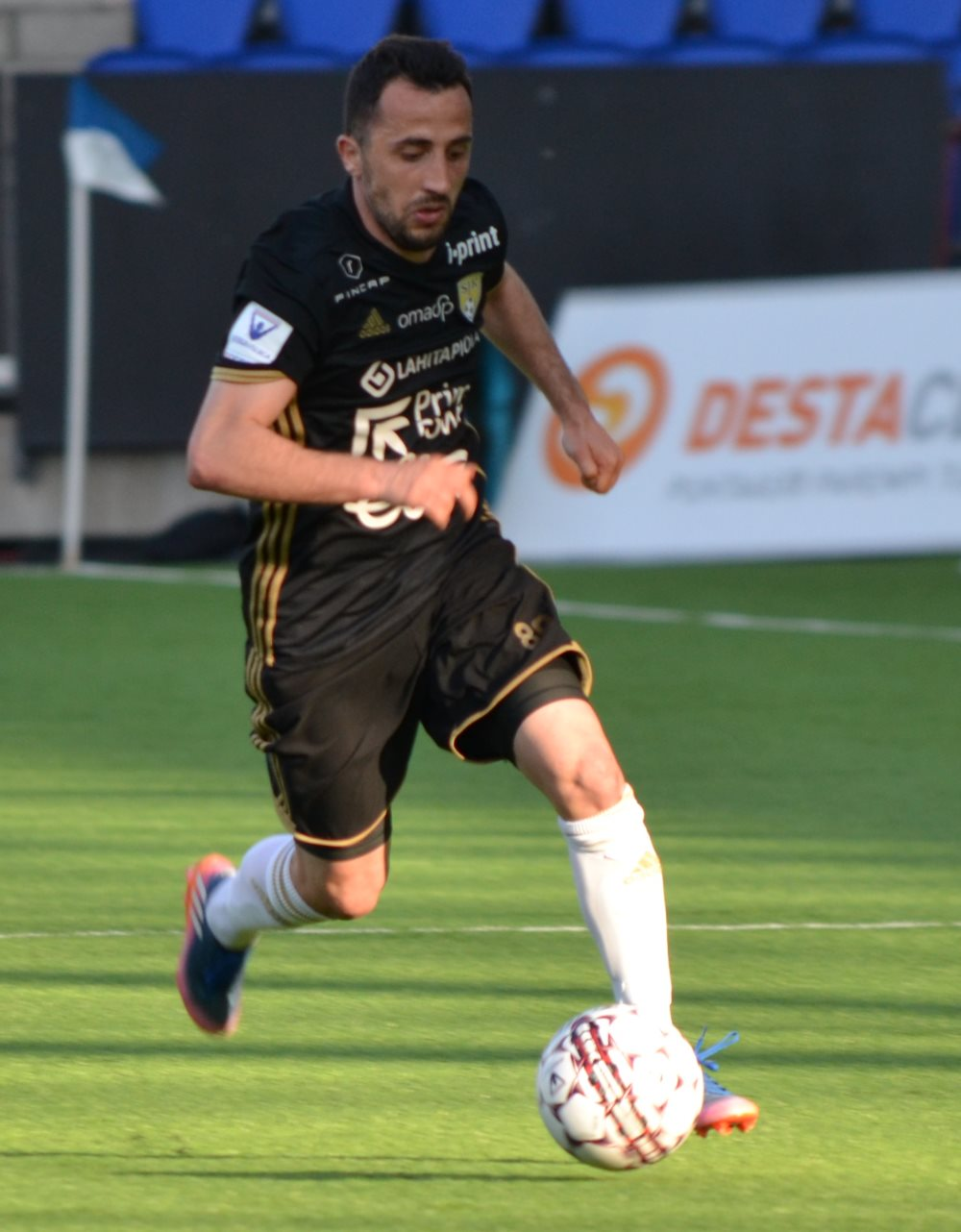

Personal information
- Full name: Erfan Zeneli
- Date of birth: 28 December 1986 (age 39)
- Place of birth: Vučitrn, SFR Yugoslavia (present-day Kosovo)
- Height: 1.68 m (5 ft 6 in)
- Position: Left winger

Team information
- Current team: SexyPöxyt

Youth career
- 1993–1997: RoPS
- 1998–2003: Jaro
- 2003–2005: HJK

Senior career*
Years	Team	Apps	(Gls)
2005–2013	HJK	166	(32)
2009–2010	→ Klubi 04	25	(8)
2014	Maccabi Petah Tikva	10	(1)
2014–2015	HJK	36	(11)
2016	Shakhter Karagandy	14	(0)
2016–2017	Inter Turku	15	(0)
2017	SJK	30	(4)
2018	RoPs	11	(1)
2019–2020	HJK	9	(0)
2020	AC Kajaani	12	(3)
2021	Viikingit	2	(0)
2022–	SexyPöxyt	36	(4)

International career
2006–2008	Finland U21	10	(2)
2013–2015	Finland	6	(0)
- * Club domestic league appearances and goals as of 21 February 2025

Erfan Zeneli (born 28 December 1986) is a Finnish footballer of Kosovar Albanian descent who plays for SexyPöxyt as a striker or left winger. Besides Finland, he has played in Israel and Kazakhstan.

== Club career ==
In February 2016, Zeneli went on trial with Kazakhstan Premier League side FC Shakhter Karagandy.

On 17 June 2016, Zeneli had his contract with Shakhter Karagandy terminated by mutual consent, going on to season a contract with FC Inter Turku for the rest of the 2016 season on 19 July 2016.

== International career ==
In April 2012 Zeneli declared to the media that he would welcome a convocation to be part of the Albania national football team and has been since in contact with coach Gianni de Biasi. He decided to play in the Finland national football team.

== Personal life ==
His older brother Ridvan is a former footballer.

== Career statistics ==
As of 7 May 2024

Appearances and goals by club, season and competition
Club	Season	League			Domestic Cups (Note: Includes Suomen Cup, Finnish League Cup, Israeli Cup and Kazakhstan Cup)		Europe		Total	
Club	Season	Division	Apps	Goals	Apps	Goals	Apps	Goals	Apps	Goals
HJK	2005	Veikkausliiga	5	1	–		–		5	1
HJK	2006	Veikkausliiga	23	2	1	0	2 (Note: Includes UEFA Cup)	0	26	2
HJK	2007	Veikkausliiga	12	0	0	0	1	0	13	0
HJK	2008	Veikkausliiga	21	0	2	2	–		23	2
HJK	2009	Veikkausliiga	0	0	0	0	0	0	0	0
HJK	2010	Veikkausliiga	18	4	2	1	3 (Note: Includes UEFA Champions League)	0	23	5
HJK	2011	Veikkausliiga	29	8	4	1	5 (Note: Includes UEFA Champions League and UEFA Europa League)	2	38	11
HJK	2012	Veikkausliiga	24	1	9	2	3	0	36	3
HJK	2013	Veikkausliiga	31	11	7	3	2	0	40	14
HJK	Total		163	34	25	9	16	2	204	45
Klubi 04 (loan)	2009	Ykkönen	25	6	–		–		25	6
Klubi 04 (loan)	2010	Ykkönen	1	1	–		–		1	1
Klubi 04 (loan)	Total		26	7	0	0	0	0	26	7
Maccabi Petah Tikva	2013–14	Israeli Premier League	10	1	1	0	–		11	1
HJK	2014	Veikkausliiga	9	3	2	0	8 (Note: Includes UEFA Europa League)	0	19	3
HJK	2015	Veikkausliiga	27	8	7	3	6	2	40	13
HJK	Total		36	11	9	3	14	2	49	16
Shakhter Karagandy	2016	Kazakhstan Premier League	14	0	1	0	–		15	0
Inter Turku	2016	Veikkausliiga	15	0	–		–		15	0
SJK	2017	Veikkausliiga	30	4	1	0	2	0	33	4
RoPS	2018	Veikkausliiga	11	1	–		–		11	1
HJK	2019	Veikkausliiga	9	0	0	0	2	0	11	0
AC Kajaani	2020	Ykkönen	12	3	–		–		12	3
Viikingit	2021	Kolmonen	2	0	–		–		2	0
SexyPöxyt	2022	Kolmonen	8	3	–		–		8	3
SexyPöxyt	2023	Kakkonen	13	0	1	0	–		14	0
SexyPöxyt	2024	Kakkonen	15	1	1	0	–		16	1
SexyPöxyt	Total		36	4	2	0	0	0	38	4
Career total			364	65	39	12	34	4	437	81

== Honours ==
Individual

- Veikkausliiga Top assist provider: 2013
- Veikkausliiga Midfielder of the year: 2013
- Veikkausliiga Player of the Month: September 2013, September 2014
