= Antti Ojanperä =

Finnish footballer (born 1983)

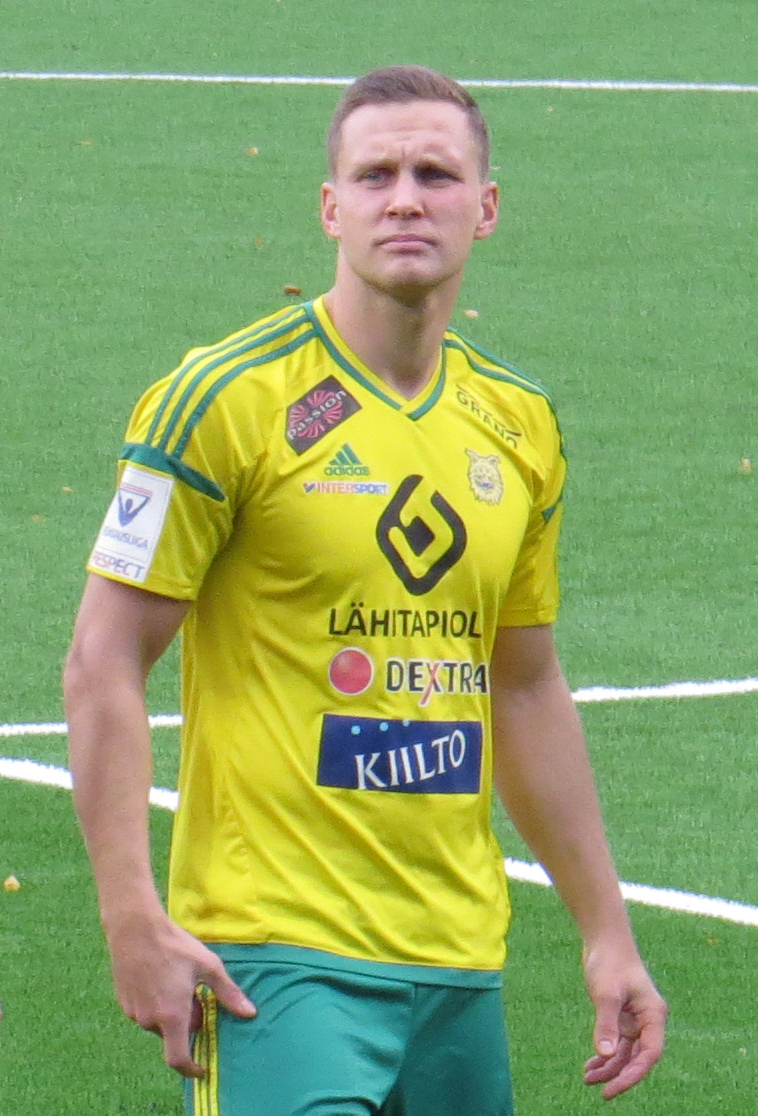
- Retired Finland footballer

Personal information
- Date of birth: 6 April 1983 (age 43)
- Place of birth: Tampere, Finland
- Height: 1.76 m (5 ft 9 in)
- Position: Defender

Senior career*
Years	Team	Apps	(Gls)
2000	NoPy	23	(2)
2001–2010	Tampere United	138	(6)
2002	→ TPV (loan)	16	(0)
2006	→ Hämeenlinna (loan)	2	(0)
2008	→ TPV (loan)	1	(0)
2011–2012	Haka	63	(0)
2013–2015	Ilves	49	(2)
- * Club domestic league appearances and goals as of 8 March 2012

Antti Ojanperä (born 6 April 1983) is a retired Finnish footballer, who plays as midfielder or defender. Throughout his senior career he had represented Tampere United in the Finnish premier division Veikkausliiga, until he moved to FC Haka of the same league in 2011.

After spending two years in FC Haka he joined Ilves until retiring at the end of the season 2015.

Ojanperä was especially known for his long throw-ins.
