= Tommi Vesala =

Finnish footballer (born 1986)

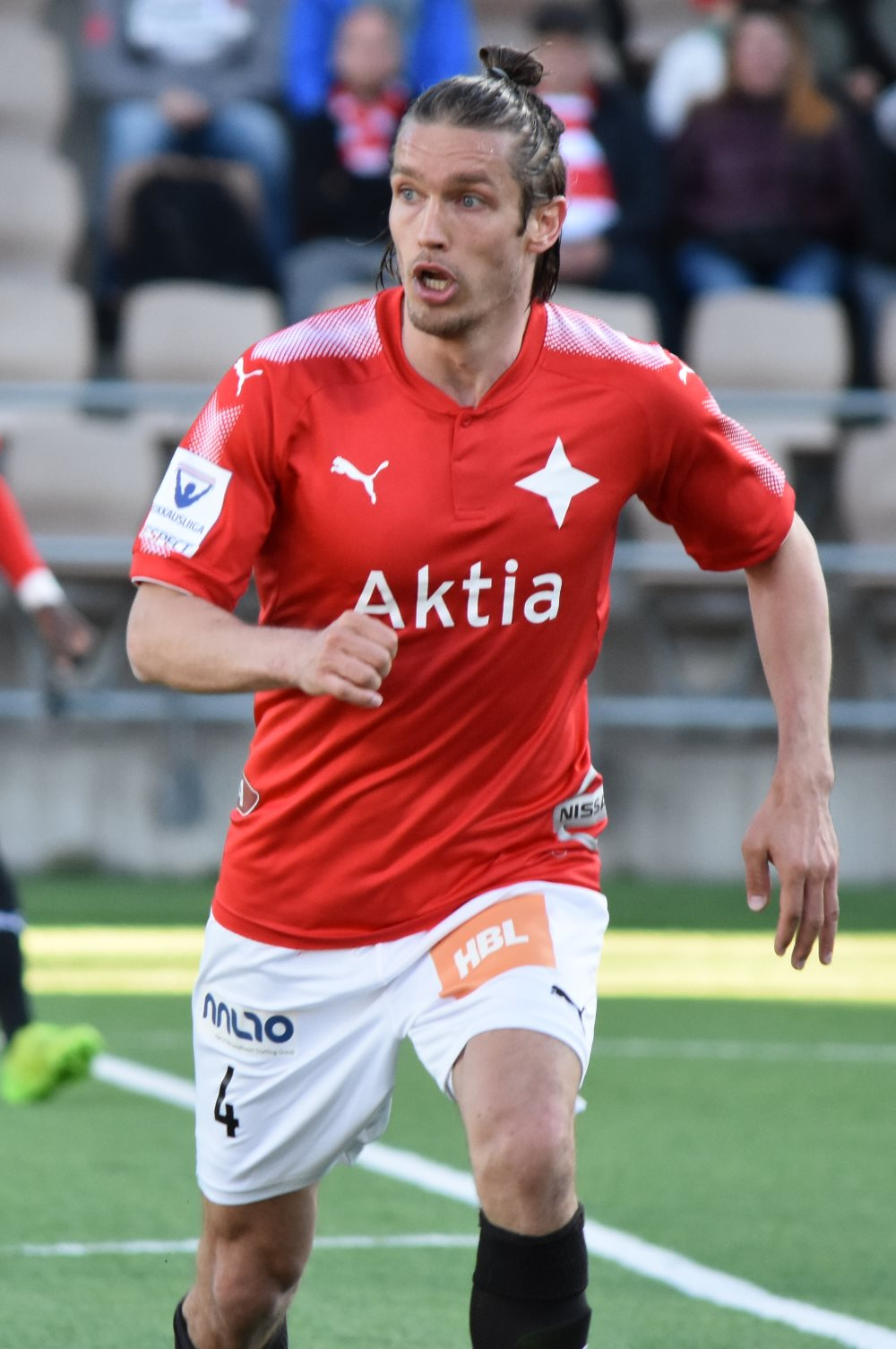

Personal information
- Date of birth: 12 January 1986 (age 40)
- Place of birth: Vihti, Finland
- Height: 1.80 m (5 ft 11 in)
- Position: Defender

Team information
- Current team: HIFK
- Number: 4

Senior career*
Years	Team	Apps	(Gls)
2003–2006	FC Espoo	51	(4)
2006–2007	FC Hämeenlinna	40	(0)
2008–2010	FC Viikingit	49	(1)
2011–2014	MYPA	99	(4)
2015–2018	HIFK	72	(3)
- * Club domestic league appearances and goals as of 26 November 2021

Tommi Vesala (born 12 January 1986) is a Finnish football player currently playing for Finnish Veikkausliiga side HIFK. Vesala began his career as a junior in FC Kasiysi. During his senior career he played at Finnish second and third tiers, Ykkönen and Kakkonen, in FC Espoo, FC Hämeenlinna and FC Viikingit before joining Veikkausliiga side Myllykosken Pallo for the season 2011. He made his league debut on 12 May 2011.

After successful season in 2014, HIFK introduced Vesala as their new player with a contract length of one year.

== Playing style ==
Vesala is described as being very versatile player with capability to play in many different roles, for example as a winger or a midfielder. First of all he's being praised of his work rate and being a player who pushes himself to the limits for the good of the whole team.

== Personal life ==
In addition to his professional football career, Vesala is also a dentist. He's also a musician in a band called And the Band, which is formed by other members Tero Karhu and Eetu Kaipio. Vesala lives in Kallio, a central district of Helsinki.
