= 2012 HJK season =

HJK
2012 season
- Chairman: Olli-Pekka Lyytikäinen
- Manager: Sixten Boström
- Stadium: Sonera Stadium
- Veikkausliiga: Champions
- Finnish Cup: Semi-final vs Honka
- League Cup: Runners-up vs TPS
- UEFA Champions League: Third qualifying round vs Celtic
- UEFA Europa League: Play-off round vs Athletic Bilbao
- Top goalscorer: League: Demba Savage (12); All: Joel Pohjanpalo (19)
Home colours	Away colours

The 2012 season was Helsingin Jalkapalloklubi's 104th competitive season. HJK is the most successful Finnish football club with 25 Finnish Championships, 11 Finnish Cup titles, 4 Finnish League Cup titles and one appearance in the UEFA Champions League Group Stages.

== Season events ==
On 30 October, HJK announced the singing of Mikael Forssell to a two-year contract, commencing 1 January 2013.

=== New contracts ===
On 9 November, Sebastian Mannström signed a new two-year contract with HJK, with Sebastian Sorsa signing a similar deal on 19 November.

== Squad ==
As of match played 27 October 2012

No.	Name	Nationality	Position	Date of birth (age)	Signed from	Signed in	Contract ends	Apps.	Goals
Goalkeepers
1	Ville Wallén	(Finland)	GK	20 June 1976 (aged 36)	Jokerit	2003			
13	Carljohan Eriksson	(Finland)	GK	25 April 1995 (aged 17)	Youth Team	2012		0	0
35	Saku-Pekka Sahlgren	(Finland)	GK	8 April 1992 (aged 20)	KPV	2011			
40	Jussi Ikonen	(Finland)	GK	22 February 1995 (aged 17)	Youth Team	2012		0	0
Defenders
2	Tuomas Kansikas	(Finland)	DF	15 May 1981 (aged 31)	MyPa	2008			
3	Valtteri Moren	(Finland)	DF	15 June 1991 (aged 21)	Youth Team	2010			
5	Rami Hakanpää	(Finland)	DF	9 October 1978 (aged 34)	Honka	2011			
6	Timi Lahti	(Finland)	DF	28 June 1990 (aged 22)	Haka	2011			
11	Mathias Lindström	(Finland)	DF	14 January 1981 (aged 31)	Tampere United	2009			
21	Mikko Sumusalo	(Finland)	DF	12 March 1990 (aged 22)	Youth Team	2009			
29	Felipe Aspegren	(Finland)	DF	12 February 1994 (aged 18)	Youth Team	2012		1	0
30	Mikko Viitikko	(Finland)	DF	18 April 1995 (aged 17)	Youth Team	2012		0	0
Midfielders
4	Antti Okkonen	(Finland)	MF	6 June 1982 (aged 30)	MyPa	2012		38	1
7	Sebastian Mannström	(Finland)	MF	29 October 1988 (aged 23)	FF Jaro	2011	2014		
16	Mika Väyrynen	(Finland)	MF	28 December 1981 (aged 30)	Leeds United	2012	2012	16	4
22	Joel Perovuo	(Finland)	MF	11 August 1985 (aged 27)	Djurgården	2011			
25	Sakari Mattila	(Finland)	MF	14 July 1989 (aged 23)	loan from Bellinzona	2012	2013		
27	Sebastian Sorsa	(Finland)	MF	25 January 1984 (aged 28)	Hamilton Academical	2009	2014		
28	Rasmus Schüller	(Finland)	MF	18 June 1991 (aged 21)	Honka	2012	2014	38	3
29	Emerik Grönroos	(Finland)	MF	6 July 1994 (aged 18)	Youth Team	2012		2	0
Forwards
8	Erfan Zeneli	(Finland)	FW	28 December 1986 (aged 25)	Youth Team	2005			
9	Berat Sadik	(Finland)	FW	14 September 1986 (aged 26)	Lahti	2011			
15	Akseli Pelvas	(Finland)	FW	8 February 1989 (aged 23)	Youth Team	2007			
18	Juho Mäkelä	(Finland)	FW	23 June 1983 (aged 29)	Sydney	2012			
19	Kastriot Kastrati	(Finland)	FW	10 February 1993 (aged 19)	Youth Team	2011			
20	Joel Pohjanpalo	(Finland)	FW	13 September 1994 (aged 18)	Youth Team	2011			
26	Demba Savage	(The Gambia)	FW	17 June 1988 (aged 24)	Honka	2012		40	12
Out on loan
12	Sherif Ashraf	(Egypt)	FW	1 January 1987 (aged 25)	El Gouna	2012		11	1
17	Nikolai Alho	(Finland)	DF	12 March 1993 (aged 19)	Youth Team	2012		18	1
31	Robin Lod	(Finland)	FW	17 April 1993 (aged 19)	Youth Team	2011			
	Alexander Ring	(Finland)	MF	9 April 1991 (aged 21)	Youth Team	2010			

=== Out on loan ===
Note: Flags indicate national team as defined under FIFA eligibility rules; some limited exceptions apply. Players may hold more than one non-FIFA nationality.

No.	Pos.	Nation	Player
12	FW	EGY	Sherif Ashraf (at FF Jaro)
17	FW	FIN	Nikolai Alho (at Lahti)

No.	Pos.	Nation	Player
31	MF	FIN	Robin Lod (at VPS)
—	MF	FIN	Alexander Ring (at Borussia Mönchengladbach)

== Transfers ==
=== In ===
Date	Position	Nationality	Name	From	Fee	Ref.
7 February 2012	MF	(Finland)	Rasmus Schüller	Honka	Undisclosed	
7 February 2012	FW	(The Gambia)	Demba Savage	Honka	Undisclosed	
1 April 2012	FW	(Egypt)	Sherif Ashraf	El Gouna	Undisclosed	
30 October 2012†	FW	(Finland)	Mikael Forssell	Leeds United	Free	

† Transfer announced on the above date, being finalised on 1 January 2013.

=== Loans in ===
Start date	Position	Nationality	Name	From	End date	Ref.
5 August 2012	MF	(Finland)	Sakari Mattila	Bellinzona	End of 2013 season	

=== Loans out ===
Start date	Position	Nationality	Name	To	End date	Ref.
9 August 2012	MF	(Finland)	Robin Lod	VPS	End of Season	
9 August 2012	DF	(Finland)	Janne Saksela	JJK Jyväskylä	Undisclosed	
22 August 2012	DF	(Finland)	Nikolai Alho	Lahti	End of Season	
4 September 2012	FW	(Egypt)	Sherif Ashraf	Jaro	End of Season	

== Competitions ==
=== Veikkausliiga ===
==== Results summary ====
Overall								Home						Away					
Pld	W	D	L	GF	GA	GD	Pts	W	D	L	GF	GA	GD	W	D	L	GF	GA	GD
33	19	7	7	63	33	+30	64	12	5	0	36	10	+26	7	2	7	27	23	+4

Last updated: 27 October 2012.
Source: See Results

==== Results ====
15 April 2012 1	HJK	3 – 1	IFK Mariehamn	Helsinki
18:30 EEST (UTC+3)	Pohjanpalo 71', 72', 74'	Report	Ekhalie 51'; Ingves (yellow card) 86'	Stadium: Telia 5G -areena Attendance: 5,121; Referee: Mattias Gestranius

19 April 2012 2	TPS	3 – 1	HJK	Turku
18:30 EEST (UTC+3)	Okaru (yellow card) 20'; Ääritalo 34'; Nyberg (yellow card) 55'; Kolehmainen 73' (pen.); Lähde (yellow card) 87'; Ristola 88' (yellow card) 89'	Report	Zeneli (yellow card) 15'; Perovuo (yellow card) 45+1' (goal) 83' (pen.); Lahti (yellow card) 73'	Stadium: Paavo Nurmi Stadium; Attendance: 2,954; Referee: Tony Asumaa

23 April 2012 3	HJK	4 – 1	FF Jaro	Helsinki
18:30 EEST (UTC+3)	Lindström 17'; Pelvas 20'; Okkonen (yellow card) 27'; Savage 29' (yellow card) 29'; Sumusalo 50'	Report	Vaganov 10'; Vasilyev (yellow card) 45'; Banner (yellow card) 47'; Agyeman (yellow card) 60'; Niang (yellow card) 83'	Stadium: Telia 5G -areena Attendance: 2,449; Referee: Mikka Lähdesmäki

29 April 2012 4	MyPa	1 – 0	HJK	Kouvola
18:30 EEST (UTC+3)	Kukka (yellow card) 32'; Ramadingaye (yellow card) 87'; Sihvola 90+2'	Report	Okkonen (yellow card) 45'; Savage (yellow card) 52'	Stadium: Kymenlaakson Sähkö Stadion; Referee: Vesa Hatila

2 May 2012 17	KuPS	0 – 3	HJK	Kuopio
18:30 EEST (UTC+3)	James (yellow card) 59'	Report	Mannström 53'; Pelvas (yellow card) 57'; Mäkelä 74', 86'	Stadium: Kuopio Football Stadium; Referee: Petteri Kari

6 May 2012 5	HJK	2 – 1	Inter Turku	Helsinki
14:00 EEST (UTC+3)	Mannström 1'; Okkonen (yellow card) 51'; Mäkelä (yellow card) 53'; Lindström (yellow card) 65'; Pohjanpalo 90+3' (yellow card) 90+3'; Perovuo (yellow card) 90+3'	Report	Kauko 43'; Gnabouyou (yellow card) 55'; Asís (yellow card) 86'; Bahne (yellow card) 90+3'	Stadium: Telia 5G -areena Referee: Dennis Antamo

12 May 2012 6	HJK	2 – 0	KuPS	Helsinki
18:30 EEST (UTC+3)	Pohjanpalo 63'; Savage 81'	Report	Puri (yellow card) 54'	Stadium: Telia 5G -areena Referee: Jouni Hyytia

16 May 2012 7	Haka	0 – 1	HJK	Valkeakoski
18:30 EEST (UTC+3)	Pirinen (yellow card) 61'; Matrone (yellow card) 64'; Sanevuori (yellow card) 90'	Report	Savage 18'	Stadium: Tehtaan kenttä Referee: Vesa Hatila

21 May 2012 8	HJK	3 – 0	Honka	Helsinki
18:30 EEST (UTC+3)	Mäkelä 35', 81'; Sorsa (yellow card) 45'; Schüller (yellow card) 51'; Savage 77'	Report	Aalto (yellow card) 67'	Stadium: Telia 5G -areena Referee: Tero Nieminen

24 May 2012 9	VPS	1 – 0	HJK	Vaasa
18:30 EEST (UTC+3)	Morrissey 54'; V.Luokkala (yellow card) 84'; Saranpää (yellow card) 90'	Report		Stadium: Hietalahti Stadium; Referee: Jari Jarvinen

27 May 2012 10	HJK	2 – 0	Lahti	Helsinki
16:00 EEST (UTC+3)	Mannström 14'; Pelvas 41'; Kansikas (yellow card) 72'; Alho (yellow card) 85'	Report	Länsitalo (yellow card) 70'; Bäckman (yellow card) 74'	Stadium: Telia 5G -areena Referee: Toni Ollikainen

16 June 2012 11	JJK	0 – 3	HJK	Jyväskylä
18:30 EEST (UTC+3)		Report	Okkonen (yellow card) 44'; Hakanpää (yellow card) 49'; Pelvas 62', 76'; Mäkelä 75'	Stadium: Harjun stadion Referee: Mattias Gestranius

20 June 2012 12	IFK Mariehamn	2 – 0	HJK	Mariehamn
18:30 EEST (UTC+3)	Jagne 17'; Kangaskolkka 77'; Forsell (yellow card) 81'; Amani (yellow card) 81'	Report	Mannström (yellow card) 74'	Stadium: Wiklöf Holding Arena; Referee: Jari Jarvinen

25 June 2012 13	HJK	0 – 0	TPS	Helsinki
18:30 EEST (UTC+3)	Okkonen (yellow card) 54'; Kansikas (yellow card) 86'	Report		Stadium: Telia 5G -areena Referee: Dennis Anntamo

28 June 2012 14	FF Jaro	2 – 2	HJK	Jakobstad
18:30 EEST (UTC+3)	Jonke 25'; M.Wargh 43'; Vaganov (yellow card) 75'	Report	Lindström (yellow card) 33'; Ashraf (yellow card) 37'; Mäkelä 45'; Savage 60'	Stadium: Jakobstads Centralplan; Referee: Petteri Kari

2 July 2012 15	HJK	1 – 1	MyPa	Helsinki
18:30 EEST (UTC+3)	Pohjanpalo 39'; Lindström (yellow card) 59'	Report	Lody (yellow card) 20'; Williams 82'	Stadium: Telia 5G -areena Referee: Tony Asumaa

7 July 2012 16	Inter Turku	2 – 0	HJK	Turku
18:30 EEST (UTC+3)	Bouwman (yellow card) 37'; Kauko 56' (yellow card) 57'; Ojala 62'; Paajanen (yellow card) 82'	Report	Schüller (yellow card) 61'	Stadium: Veritas Stadion; Referee: Jari Jarvinen

21 July 2012 18	HJK	1 – 0	Haka	Helsinki
18:30 EEST (UTC+3)	Lahti (yellow card) 32'; Mäkelä 57'	Report	Kuusijärvi (yellow card) 34'	Stadium: Telia 5G -areena Referee: Toni Ollikainen

28 July 2012 19	Honka	1 – 0	HJK	Espoo
18:30 EEST (UTC+3)	Rexhepi (yellow card) 63'; Tammilehto (yellow card) 76'; Väyrynen 80'	Report	Lindström (yellow card) 43'; Schüller (yellow card) 49'; Wallén (red card) 58'; Sorsa (yellow card) 63'; Hakanpää (yellow card) 78' (yellow-red card) 90'; Sadik (yellow card) 89'	Stadium: Tapiolan Urheilupuisto; Referee: Mattias Gestranius

4 August 2012 20	HJK	3 – 3	VPS	Helsinki
18:30 EEST (UTC+3)	Pelvas 39'; Okkonen (yellow card) 45'; Savage 74'; Väyrynen 82'	Report	Parikka 34', 68' (pen.); Uimaniemi (yellow card) 41'; Strandvall 43'; O'Neil (yellow card) 55'	Stadium: Telia 5G -areena Referee: Tero Nieminen

12 August 2012 21	Lahti	3 – 0	HJK	Lahti
16:00 EEST (UTC+3)	Hietanen 49'; Sinisalo 60'; Großöhmichen (yellow card) 61'; Bäckman 68'	Report	Kansikas (yellow card) 57'	Stadium: Lahti Stadium; Referee: Anntamo Dennis

18 August 2012 22	HJK	2 – 0	JJK	Helsinki
18:30 EEST (UTC+3)	Mannström 36'; Sorsa (yellow card) 37'; Väyrynen 43' (pen.); Mattila (yellow card) 90'	Report	Manninen (yellow card) 32'; Tapaninen (yellow card) 54' van Gelderen (yellow card) 74' (yellow-red card) 74'	Stadium: Telia 5G -areena Referee: Tony Asumaa

26 August 2012 23	HJK	5 – 1	IFK Mariehamn	Helsinki
18:30 EEST (UTC+3)	Savage 27', 88' (yellow card) 76'; Zeneli 47'; Sadik 54'; Mäkelä 65'; Mattila (yellow card) 68'	Report	Kangaskolkka 2' (yellow card) 67' (yellow-red card) 76'	Stadium: Telia 5G -areena Referee: Mattias Gestranius

2 September 2012 24	TPS	1 – 2	HJK	Turku
16:00 EEST (UTC+3)	Ristola (yellow card) 22'; Eriba (yellow card) 45+1'; Mäkinen 90'	Report	Väyrynen 23' (yellow card) 39'; Mäkelä 41'; Mattila (yellow card) 57'	Stadium: Paavo Nurmi Stadium; Referee: Petteri Kari

14 September 2012 25	HJK	0 – 0	FF Jaro	Helsinki
18:30 EEST (UTC+3)	Perovuo (yellow card) 79'	Report	Tahvanainen (yellow card) 42'	Stadium: Telia 5G -areena Referee: Tommi Gronman

17 September 2012 26	MyPa	1 – 4	HJK	Kouvola
18:30 EEST (UTC+3)	Sesay (yellow card) 32'; A.Koskinen (yellow card) 44'; Aho 69'	Report	Väyrynen (yellow card) 30'; Hakanpää 44'; Savage 45+3' (yellow card) 68'; Pohjanpalo 62', 77'	Stadium: Kymenlaakson Sähkö Stadion; Referee: Toni Ollikainen

23 September 2012 27	HJK	1 – 1	Inter Turku	Helsinki
18:30 EEST (UTC+3)	Schüller 62'	Report	Obilor (yellow card) 10'; Mäkelä 33' (o.g.); Kauko (yellow card) 47'	Stadium: Telia 5G -areena Referee: Tony Asumaa

26 September 2012 28	HJK	4 – 1	KuPS	Helsinki
18:30 EEST (UTC+3)	Savage 16'; Pelvas 27', 46', 90' (pen.); Perovuo (yellow card) 59'	Report	Hynynen (yellow card) 50'; Purje (yellow card) 73'; Dudu 88'	Stadium: Telia 5G -areena Referee: Jari Jarvinen

1 October 2012 29	Haka	2 – 2	HJK	Valkeakoski
18:30 EEST (UTC+3)	Robinson 18' (pen.); Bright 23'; Matrone (yellow card) 48'	Report	Sumusalo (yellow card) 18'; Sorsa (yellow card) 39'; Mäkelä 57'; Moren 65'; Zeneli (yellow card) 73'; Kansikas (yellow card) 90'	Stadium: Tehtaan kenttä Referee: Mikko Lehtola

8 October 2012 30	HJK	1 – 0	Honka	Helsinki
18:30 EEST (UTC+3)	Savage 50' (yellow card) 84'; Hakanpää (yellow card) 70'; Mattila (yellow card) 83'	Report	Rexhepi (yellow card) 22'; Aalto (yellow card) 55'; Peltonen (yellow card) 90+2'	Stadium: Telia 5G -areena Referee: Antti Munukka

19 October 2012 31	VPS	1 – 3	HJK	Vaasa
18:30 EEST (UTC+3)	Fowler (yellow card) 29'; Parikka 48' (pen.); Woodbine (yellow card) 54'; Heini (yellow card) 90+3'	Report	Pohjanpalo 34'; Abdulahi 38'; Lahti (yellow card) 48'; Sadik 60'	Stadium: Hietalahti Stadium; Referee: Tony Asumaa

22 October 2012 32	HJK	2 – 0	Lahti	Helsinki
18:30 EEST (UTC+3)	Sadik 54' (pen.); Savage 84' (yellow card) 84'	Report	Länsitalo (yellow card) 39'; Klinga (yellow card) 50'; Shala (yellow card) 56'; Bäckman (yellow card) 90+3'	Stadium: Telia 5G -areena Referee: Petteri Kari

27 October 2012 33	JJK	3 – 6	HJK	Jyväskylä
14:00 EEST (UTC+3)	Innanen (yellow card) 37'; Hilska 86', 87'; Järvinen 90+2'	Report	Mannström 11'; Schüller 14'; Pohjanpalo 20', 74'; Sadik 69', 90'	Stadium: Harjun stadion Referee: Dennis Antamo

==== League table ====
Pos	Team	Pld	W	D	L	GF	GA	GD	Pts	Qualification or relegation
1	HJK (C)	33	19	7	7	63	33	+30	64	Qualification to Champions League second qualifying round
2	FC Inter	33	17	7	9	57	42	+15	58	Qualification to Europa League first qualifying round (Note: IFK Mariehamn qualified for the first qualifying round of the UEFA Europa League via Fair Play rankings.)
3	TPS	33	16	6	11	55	33	+22	54	Qualification to Europa League first qualifying round
4	IFK Mariehamn	33	13	12	8	50	43	+7	51	Qualification to Europa League first qualifying round
5	FC Lahti	33	16	2	15	45	49	−4	50	

Source: veikkausliiga.com
Rules for classification: 1) points; 2) goal difference; 3) number of goals scored.
(C) Champions

=== Finnish Cup ===
26 April 2012 Round 7	HJK	2 – 1	FF Jaro	Helsinki
18:30 EEST (UTC+3)	Mannström (yellow card) 33' (goal) 40'; Sumusalo (yellow card) 59'; Pohjanpalo 74'	Report	Niang 29'; Grove (yellow card) 57'; Kronholm (yellow card) 64'	Stadium: Sonera Stadium; Referee: Jari Järvinen

9 May 2012 Quarterfinal	HJK	3 – 0	KooTeePee	Helsinki
18:30 EEST (UTC+3)	Ashraf 33'; Alho 35'; Lahti (yellow card) 45'; Zeneli 90+2'	Report	J.Laitinen (yellow card) 34'	Stadium: Sonera Stadium; Referee: Jari Järvinen

31 May 2012 Semifinal	FC Honka	1 – 1 (a.e.t.) (5 – 4 p)	HJK	Vantaa
18:30 EEST (UTC+3)	Tammilehto 14'	Report	Schüller (yellow card) 13'; Zeneli (yellow card) 23' (goal) 52'	Stadium: ISS Stadion; Referee: Petteri Kari
	Penalties
	Äijälä (penalty scored); Väyrynen (penalty scored); Koskinen (penalty scored); Yaghoubi (penalty scored); Aalto (penalty scored)		(penalty missed) Okkonen; (penalty scored) Zeneli; (penalty scored) Pelvas; (penalty scored) Ashraf; (penalty scored) Lindström

=== League Cup ===
==== Group 2 ====
Pos	Team	Pld	W	D	L	GF	GA	GD	Pts	HON	HJK	MYP	LAH
1	FC Honka (A)	6	4	1	1	15	6	+9	13		4–0	2–1	4–1
2	Helsingin Jalkapalloklubi (A)	6	3	0	3	10	12	−2	9	0–2		4–0	3–2
3	MYPA (A)	6	2	1	3	7	11	−4	7	2–1	3–1		1–1
4	FC Lahti	6	1	2	3	9	12	−3	5	2–2	1–2	2–0	

Updated to match(es) played on 14 March 2012. Source: veikkausliiga.com
Legend: Blue = home team win; Yellow = draw; Red = away team win.
Rules for classification: 1) points 2) head-to-head points 3) head-to-head goal difference 4) head-to-head number of goals scored 5) goal difference 6) number of goals scored
(A) Advance to a further round

13 January 2012 1	HJK	3 – 2	Lahti	Helsinki
17:00 EET (UTC+2)	Sadik 8', 27'; Mannström 47'	Report	Bäckman (yellow card) 24'; Kari 32'; Mero (yellow card) 40'; Länsitalo 53'	Stadium: Talin Jalkapallohalli; Referee: Antti Munukka

20 January 2012 2	HJK	4 – 0	MYPA	Helsinki
15:00 EET (UTC+2)	Pohjanpalo 30', 36'; Kastrati 41'; Alho (yellow card) 54'; Lahti 69'	Report	Ramadingaye (yellow card) 33'; Aho (yellow card) 85'	Stadium: Talin Jalkapallohalli; Referee: Antti Munukka

4 February 2012 3	HJK	0 – 2	FC Honka	Helsinki
14:30 EET (UTC+2)	Sadik (yellow card) 16'	Report	Väyrynen 9' (yellow card) 15'; Tammilehto 86'; Heikkilä (yellow card) 90'	Stadium: Talin Jalkapallohalli; Referee: Toni Ollikainen

17 February 2012 4	FC Honka	4 – 0	HJK	Vantaa
14:00 EET (UTC+2)	Tammilehto (yellow card) 10' (goal) 19'; Äijälä 51'; Dudu 70', 84'; Koskinen (red card) 71'; Rexhepi (yellow card) 71'; Heikkilä (yellow card) 74'; Yaghoubi (yellow card) 80'	Report	Sumusalo (yellow card) 74'	Stadium: Myyrmäki-halli; Referee: Antti Munukka

21 February 2012 5	Lahti	1 – 2	HJK	Lahti
18:30 EET (UTC+2)	Rafael (yellow card) 18'; Kari 86' (pen.)	Report	Pohjanpalo 60'; Kastrati 79'	Stadium: Lahden Suurhalli; Referee: Dennis Antamo

3 March 2012 6	MYPA	3 – 1	HJK	Kouvola
14:00 EET (UTC+2)	Oksanen 16'; M.Selin (yellow card) 34' (goal) 43'; O'Neill 90' (pen.)	Report	Hakanpää (yellow card) 56' (yellow-red card) 90+3'; Pelvas 75'	Stadium: Lehtomäki Tekonurmi; Referee: Mikko Leino

==== Knockout stages ====
21 March 2012 Quarterfinal	HJK	2 – 1	KuPS	Helsinki
18:00 EET (UTC+2)	Sadik 32'; Okkonen 60'; Alho (yellow card) 90'	Report	J.Voutilainen (yellow card) 31'; Obiefule (yellow card) 53'; Ilo 78'	Stadium: Sonera Stadium; Referee: Pettari Kari

29 March 2012 Semifinal	Inter Turku	2 – 2 (3 – 4 p)	HJK	Turku
19:00 EEST (UTC+3)	Bouwman 50' (yellow card) 75'; Sirbiladze 85'	Report	Perovuo 57'; Pelvas 59'; Mannström (yellow card) 73'; Okkonen (yellow card) 90'	Referee: Mattias Gestranius

4 April 2012 Final	TPS	1 – 1 (4 – 2 p)	HJK	Helsinki
18:30 EEST (UTC+3)	Lähde 43'	Report	Schüller (yellow card) 5'; Pohjanpalo 49'; Kansikas (yellow card) 89'; Lindström (yellow card) 90+1'	Stadium: Sonera Stadium; Referee: Dennis Antamo

=== UEFA Champions League ===
==== Qualifying phase ====
17 July 2012 2nd Qualifying Round 1st leg	HJK (Finland)	7 – 0	(Iceland) KR	Helsinki, Finland
19:00 EEST (UTC+3)	Mäkelä 13', 78', 83'; Väyrynen 20' (pen.); Pohjanpalo 48', 67'; Schüller 57'	Report	Gunnarsson (yellow card) 19'	Stadium: Sonera Stadium; Attendance: 6,327; Referee: Harald Lechner (Austria)

24 July 2012 2nd Qualifying Round 2nd leg	KR (Iceland)	1 – 2 (1 – 9 agg.)	(Finland) HJK	Reykjavík, Iceland
22:15 EEST (UTC+3)	Hauksson (yellow card) 40'; A.Sigurjónsson (yellow card) 48'; Sigurðsson (yellow card) 66'; Atlason 74'; G.Sigurdarson (yellow card) 90'	Report	Sadik 66' (yellow card) 90'; Lindström 72'	Stadium: KR-völlur; Attendance: 561; Referee: Steven McLean (Scotland)

1 August 2012 3rd Qualifying Round 1st leg	Celtic (Scotland)	2 – 1	(Finland) HJK	Glasgow, Scotland
21:45 EEST (UTC+3)	Hooper 54'; Mulgrew 61'; Samaras (yellow card) 70'	Report	Schüller 48'; Väyrynen (yellow card) 52'; Sadik (yellow card) 62'	Stadium: Celtic Park; Attendance: 52,849; Referee: Miroslav Zelinka (Czech Republic)

8 August 2012 3rd Qualifying Round 2nd leg	HJK (Finland)	0 – 2 (1 – 4 agg.)	(Scotland) Celtic	Helsinki, Finland
20:00 EEST (UTC+3)	Savage (yellow card) 89'	Report	Commons (yellow card) 27'; Mulgrew (yellow card) 53'; Wanyama (yellow card) 54' (yellow-red card) 71'; Ledley 67'; Kayal (yellow card) 85'; Samaras 86'; Brown (yellow card) 87'	Stadium: Sonera Stadium; Attendance: 10,700; Referee: Robert Schörgenhofer (Austria)

=== UEFA Europa League ===
==== Play-off ====
23 August 2012 Play-off 1st leg	Athletic Bilbao (Spain)	6 – 0	(Finland) HJK	Bilbao, Spain
21:00 EEST (UTC+2)	Aduriz 25', 51'; Susaeta 31', 57'; Iñigo Pérez 42'; Iraola 85'	Report	Lindström (yellow card) 41'	Stadium: San Mamés Stadium; Attendance: 18,288; Referee: Bülent Yıldırım (Turkey)

30 August 2012 Play-off 2st leg	HJK (Finland)	3 – 3 (3 – 9 agg.)	(Spain) Athletic Bilbao	Helsinki, Finland
19:00 EEST (UTC+3)	Schüller 25'; Pelvas (yellow card) 55' (yellow-red card) 82'; Perovuo 62'; Pohjanpalo 70'	Report	San José 67'; Muniain (yellow card) 76'; Hakanpää 77' (o.g.); Martínez 88'	Stadium: Sonera Stadium; Attendance: 5,580; Referee: Alan Kelly (Republic of Ireland)

== Squad statistics ==
As of Match played 27 October 2012

=== Appearances and goals ===
No.	Pos	Nat	Player	Total		Veikkausliiga		Finnish Cup		League Cup		UEFA Champions League		UEFA Europa League	
No.	Pos	Nat	Player	Apps	Goals	Apps	Goals	Apps	Goals	Apps	Goals	Apps	Goals	Apps	Goals
1	GK	(Finland) FIN	Ville Wallén	47	0	31	0	1	0	9	0	4	0	2	0
2	DF	(Finland) FIN	Tuomas Kansikas	35	0	21+1	0	3	0	6+2	0	1	0	1	0
3	DF	(Finland) FIN	Valtteri Moren	9	1	4+3	1	1	0	0	0	0	0	1	0
4	MF	(Finland) FIN	Antti Okkonen	38	1	20+2	0	2+1	0	5+4	1	1+2	0	0+1	0
5	DF	(Finland) FIN	Rami Hakanpää	29	1	21+1	1	1	0	3+1	0	1	0	0+1	0
6	DF	(Finland) FIN	Timi Lahti	42	1	24+1	0	3	0	8	1	4	0	2	0
7	MF	(Finland) FIN	Sebastian Mannström	45	7	21+9	5	2	1	6+2	1	3	0	2	0
8	FW	(Finland) FIN	Erfan Zeneli	36	3	18+6	1	3	2	5+1	0	0+1	0	1+1	0
9	FW	(Finland) FIN	Berat Sadik	21	9	8+4	5	0	0	5	3	1+2	1	1	0
11	DF	(Finland) FIN	Mathias Lindström	34	2	18	1	2+1	0	8	0	3+1	1	1	0
14	DF	(Finland) FIN	Janne Saksela	3	0	0	0	0	0	1+2	0	0	0	0	0
15	FW	(Finland) FIN	Akseli Pelvas	33	10	11+11	8	2+1	0	2+3	2	0+2	0	1	0
16	MF	(Finland) FIN	Mika Väyrynen	16	4	10+2	3	0	0	0	0	3	1	1	0
18	FW	(Finland) FIN	Juho Mäkelä	33	13	19+8	10	1+1	0	0	0	3	3	0+1	0
19	FW	(Finland) FIN	Kastriot Kastrati	6	2	0	0	0	0	1+5	2	0	0	0	0
20	FW	(Finland) FIN	Joel Pohjanpalo	42	19	23+5	11	1+1	1	8	4	2+1	2	1	1
21	DF	(Finland) FIN	Mikko Sumusalo	34	1	18+2	1	2	0	7	0	4	0	1	0
22	MF	(Finland) FIN	Joel Perovuo	39	3	14+10	1	1	0	6+2	1	3+1	0	2	1
25	MF	(Finland) FIN	Sakari Mattila	11	0	4+6	0	0	0	0	0	0	0	0+1	0
26	FW	(The Gambia) GAM	Demba Savage	40	12	27+3	12	0	0	4+1	0	3	0	1+1	0
27	DF	(Finland) FIN	Sebastian Sorsa	31	0	20+1	0	0+1	0	3	0	4	0	2	0
28	MF	(Finland) FIN	Rasmus Schüller	38	4	24+1	2	2	0	5	0	3+1	1	2	1
35	GK	(Finland) FIN	Saku-Pekka Sahlgren	5	0	2+1	0	2	0	0	0	0	0	0	0
Players from Klubi-04 who appeared:
29	DF	(Finland) FIN	Felipe Aspegren	1	0	0	0	0	0	0+1	0	0	0	0	0
29	MF	(Finland) FIN	Emerik Grönroos	2	0	0	0	0	0	0+2	0	0	0	0	0
31	FW	(Finland) FIN	Aleksi Pahkasalo	1	0	0	0	0	0	0+1	0	0	0	0	0
Players away from the club on loan:
12	FW	(Egypt) EGY	Sherif Ashraf	11	1	4+4	0	1+2	1	0	0	0	0	0	0
17	DF	(Finland) FIN	Nikolai Alho	18	1	0+9	0	2	1	2+4	0	1	0	0	0
31	MF	(Finland) FIN	Robin Lod	10	0	1+6	0	1+1	0	0	0	0+1	0	0	0
Trialists:
25	DF	(Finland) FIN	Patrick O'Shaughnessy	1	0	0	0	0	0	0+1	0	0	0	0	0
25	MF	(United States) USA	Justin Moose	1	0	0	0	0	0	1	0	0	0	0	0
Players who left the club during the season:

=== Goal scorers ===
Place	Position	Nation	Number	Name	Veikkausliiga	Finnish Cup	League Cup	UEFA Champions League	UEFA Europa League	Total
1	FW	(Finland)	20	Joel Pohjanpalo	11	1	4	2	1	19
2	MF	(Finland)	18	Juho Mäkelä	10	0	0	3	0	13
3	FW	(The Gambia)	26	Demba Savage	12	0	0	0	0	12
4	FW	(Finland)	15	Akseli Pelvas	8	0	2	0	0	10
5	FW	(Finland)	9	Berat Sadik	5	0	3	1	0	9
6	MF	(Finland)	7	Sebastian Mannström	5	1	1	0	0	7
7	MF	(Finland)	28	Rasmus Schüller	2	0	0	2	1	5
8	MF	(Finland)	16	Mika Väyrynen	3	0	0	1	0	4
9	FW	(Finland)	8	Erfan Zeneli	1	2	0	0	0	3
9	MF	(Finland)	22	Joel Perovuo	1	0	1	0	1	3
11	DF	(Finland)	11	Mathias Lindström	1	0	0	1	0	2
11	FW	(Finland)	19	Kastriot Kastrati	0	0	2	0	0	2
13	DF	(Finland)	3	Valtteri Moren	1	0	0	0	0	1
13	DF	(Finland)	5	Rami Hakanpää	1	0	0	0	0	1
13	DF	(Finland)	21	Mikko Sumusalo	1	0	0	0	0	1
13	FW	(Egypt)	12	Sherif Ashraf	0	1	0	0	0	1
13	DF	(Finland)	17	Nikolai Alho	0	1	0	0	0	1
13	DF	(Finland)	6	Timi Lahti	0	0	1	0	0	1
13	MF	(Finland)	4	Antti Okkonen	0	0	1	0	0	1
13				Own goal	1	0	0	0	0	1
				TOTALS	63	6	15	10	3	97

=== Clean sheets ===
Place	Position	Nation	Number	Name	Veikkausliiga	Finnish Cup	League Cup	UEFA Champions League	UEFA Europa League	Total
1	GK	(Finland)	1	Ville Wallén	12	0	1	1	0	14
2	GK	(Finland)	35	Saku-Pekka Sahlgren	0	1	0	0	0	1
				TOTALS	12	1	1	1	0	15

=== Disciplinary record ===
Number	Nation	Position	Name	Veikkausliiga		Finnish Cup		League Cup		UEFA Champions League		UEFA Europa League		Total	
Number	Nation	Position	Name	Yellow card	Red card	Yellow card	Red card	Yellow card	Red card	Yellow card	Red card	Yellow card	Red card	Yellow card	Red card
1	(Finland)	GK	Ville Wallén	0	1	0	0	0	0	0	0	0	0	0	1
2	(Finland)	DF	Tuomas Kansikas	4	0	0	0	1	0	0	0	0	0	5	0
4	(Finland)	MF	Antti Okkonen	6	0	0	0	1	0	0	0	0	0	7	0
5	(Finland)	DF	Rami Hakanpää	4	1	0	0	2	1	0	0	0	0	6	2
6	(Finland)	DF	Timi Lahti	3	0	1	0	0	0	0	0	0	0	4	0
7	(Finland)	MF	Sebastian Mannström	1	0	1	0	1	0	0	0	0	0	3	0
8	(Finland)	MF	Erfan Zeneli	2	0	1	0	0	0	0	0	0	0	3	0
9	(Finland)	FW	Berat Sadik	1	0	0	0	1	0	2	0	0	0	4	0
11	(Finland)	DF	Mathias Lindström	4	0	0	0	1	0	0	0	1	0	6	0
15	(Finland)	FW	Akseli Pelvas	1	0	0	0	0	0	0	0	2	1	3	1
16	(Finland)	MF	Mika Väyrynen	2	0	0	0	0	0	1	0	0	0	3	0
18	(Finland)	FW	Juho Mäkelä	1	0	0	0	0	0	0	0	0	0	1	0
20	(Finland)	FW	Joel Pohjanpalo	1	0	0	0	0	0	0	0	0	0	1	0
21	(Finland)	DF	Mikko Sumusalo	1	0	1	0	1	0	0	0	0	0	3	0
22	(Finland)	MF	Joel Perovuo	4	0	0	0	0	0	0	0	0	0	4	0
25	(Finland)	MF	Sakari Mattila	4	0	0	0	0	0	0	0	0	0	4	0
26	(The Gambia)	FW	Demba Savage	6	0	0	0	0	0	1	0	0	0	7	0
27	(Finland)	DF	Sebastian Sorsa	4	0	0	0	0	0	0	0	0	0	4	0
28	(Finland)	MF	Rasmus Schüller	3	0	1	0	1	0	0	0	0	0	5	0
Players away on loan:
12	(Egypt)	FW	Sherif Ashraf	1	0	0	0	0	0	0	0	0	0	1	0
17	(Finland)	DF	Nikolai Alho	1	0	0	0	2	0	0	0	0	0	3	0
			TOTALS	54	2	5	0	11	1	4	0	2	1	76	4
