= 2012 Finnish League Cup =

2012 Liigacup
Tournament details
- Country: Finland
- Teams: 12

Final positions
- Champions: TPS Turku
- Runners-up: HJK Helsinki

The 2012 Finnish League Cup is the 16th season of the Finnish League Cup, Finland's second-most prestigious cup football tournament. FC Honka are the defending champions, having won their second league cup last year.

The cup consists of two stages. First there will be a group stage that involves the 12 Veikkausliiga teams divided into three groups. The top two teams and two best 3rd placed teams from each group will enter the one-legged elimination rounds – quarter-finals, semi-finals and the final.

== Group stage ==
Every team will play every other team of its group twice, both home and away. The group stage matches will be played from 13 January to 17 March 2012.

=== Group 1 ===
Pos	Team	Pld	W	D	L	GF	GA	GD	Pts	TPS	INT	HAK	MAR
1	Turun Palloseura (A)	6	5	0	1	11	3	+8	15		2–0	1–0	3–0
2	FC Inter (A)	6	4	0	2	11	3	+8	12	0–1		2–0	5–0
3	Haka	6	1	1	4	3	10	−7	4 (Note: MAR 0–1 HAK; HAK 2–2 MAR)	0–4	0–1		2–2
4	IFK Mariehamn	6	1	1	4	5	14	−9	4	3–0	0–3	0–1	

Updated to match(es) played on 14 March 2012. Source: veikkausliiga.com
Rules for classification: 1) points 2) head-to-head points 3) head-to-head goal difference 4) head-to-head number of goals scored 5) goal difference 6) number of goals scored
(A) Advance to a further round

=== Group 2 ===
Pos	Team	Pld	W	D	L	GF	GA	GD	Pts	HON	HJK	MYP	LAH
1	FC Honka (A)	6	4	1	1	15	6	+9	13		4–0	2–1	4–1
2	Helsingin Jalkapalloklubi (A)	6	3	0	3	10	12	−2	9	0–2		4–0	3–2
3	MYPA (A)	6	2	1	3	7	11	−4	7	2–1	3–1		1–1
4	FC Lahti	6	1	2	3	9	12	−3	5	2–2	1–2	2–0	

Updated to match(es) played on 14 March 2012. Source: veikkausliiga.com
Rules for classification: 1) points 2) head-to-head points 3) head-to-head goal difference 4) head-to-head number of goals scored 5) goal difference 6) number of goals scored
(A) Advance to a further round

=== Group 3 ===
Pos	Team	Pld	W	D	L	GF	GA	GD	Pts	JAR	KPS	VPS	JJK
1	FF Jaro (A)	6	3	1	2	7	6	+1	10		2–2	1–0	3–2
2	KuPS (A)	6	2	3	1	7	7	0	9	1–0		1–1	1–3
3	Vaasan Palloseura (A)	6	2	1	3	7	7	0	7 (Note: JJK 2–4 VPS; VPS 1–2 JJK)	1–0	0–1		1–2
4	Jyväskylän Jalkapalloklubi	6	2	1	3	10	11	−1	7	0–1	1–1	2–4	

Updated to match(es) played on 17 March 2012. Source: veikkausliiga.com
Rules for classification: 1) points 2) head-to-head points 3) head-to-head goal difference 4) head-to-head number of goals scored 5) goal difference 6) number of goals scored
(A) Advance to a further round

== Third-placed qualifiers ==
At the end of the group stage, a comparison is made between the third placed teams. The two best third-placed teams will advance to the quarter-finals.

Pos	Team	Pld	W	D	L	GF	GA	GD	Pts
1	VPS	6	2	1	3	7	7	0	7
2	MYPA	6	2	1	3	7	11	−4	7
3	Haka	6	1	1	4	3	10	−7	4

Updated to match(es) played on 17 March 2012. Source: veikkausliiga.com
Rules for classification: 1) points; 2) goal difference; 3) number of goals scored.

== Knockout stage ==
=== Quarter-finals ===
23 March 2012

TPS	4–0	MYPA
Ristola 5'; Pennanen 39'; Ääritalo 59'; Hyyrynen 87'

Urheilupuiston yläkenttä, Turku
Referee: Vesa Hätilä

21 March 2012

FC Honka	0–1	VPS
		Fowler 15'

Tapiolan urheilupuisto, Espoo
Referee: Tommi Grönman

21 March 2012

FF Jaro	2–3	FC Inter
Aalto 5'; Skrabb 58'		Lehtonen 19'; Paajanen 52'; Sirbiladze 56'

Tellushalli, Jakobstad
Attendance: 720
Referee: Ville Nevalainen

21 March 2012

HJK	2–1	KuPS
Sadik 32'; Okkonen 60'		Ilo 78'

Sonera Stadium, Helsinki
Referee: Petteri Kari

=== Semi-finals ===
28 March 2012

TPS	2–0	VPS
Ääritalo 49', 65'

Urheilupuiston yläkenttä, Turku
Referee: Antti Munukka

29 March 2012

FC Inter	2–2	HJK
Bouwman 49'; Sirbiladze 85'		Perovuo 57'; Pelvas 59'
Penalties
	3–4

Urheilupuiston yläkenttä, Turku
Referee: Mattias Gestranius

=== Final ===
4 April 2012

TPS	1–1	HJK
Lähde 44'		Pohjanpalo 49'
Penalties
Pennanen (penalty scored); Kolehmainen (penalty scored); Nyberg (penalty scored); Lähde (penalty scored)	4–2	(penalty missed) Zeneli; (penalty missed) Pohjanpalo; (penalty scored) Pelvas; (penalty scored) Kansikas

Sonera Stadium, Helsinki
Attendance: 2,123
Referee: Dennis Antamo
