= List of Finnish football transfers summer 2015 =

This is a list of Finnish football transfers in the summer transfer window 2015 by club. Only transfers of the Veikkausliiga and Ykkönen are included.

== 2015 Veikkausliiga ==
Note: Flags indicate national team as has been defined under FIFA eligibility rules. Players may hold more than one non-FIFA nationality.

=== FC Inter ===
In:

No.	Pos.	Nation	Player

Out

No.	Pos.	Nation	Player
—	FW	FIN	Vahid Hambo (to (England) Brighton & Hove Albion)

=== FC Lahti ===
In:

No.	Pos.	Nation	Player

Out:

No.	Pos.	Nation	Player
24	DF	FIN	Petri Pasanen (Retired)

=== FF Jaro ===
In:

No.	Pos.	Nation	Player
14	MF	FIN	Alexei Eremenko (from (Scotland) Kilmarnock)
24	FW	SWE	Alibek Aliev (on loan from (Russia) CSKA Moscow)

Out

No.	Pos.	Nation	Player

=== HIFK ===
In:

No.	Pos.	Nation	Player
—	DF	FIN	Sauli Väisänen (on loan from (Sweden) AIK)

Out

No.	Pos.	Nation	Player

=== HJK ===
In:

No.	Pos.	Nation	Player
4	DF	FIN	Juhani Ojala (on loan from (Russia) Terek Grozny)
13	MF	FIN	Toni Kolehmainen (from (Norway) Hønefoss)
21	GK	GER	Thomas Dähne (from (Germany) RB Leipzig)
33	DF	NGA	Taye Taiwo (from (Turkey) Bursaspor)
95	FW	BRA	Ademir Candido (loan from (Brazil) Ituano)
99	FW	SEN	Macoumba Kandji (from (Saudi Arabia) Al-Faisaly)

Out:

No.	Pos.	Nation	Player
2	DF	FIN	Alex Lehtinen (to (Finland) Honka)
8	FW	GAM	Demba Savage (to (Sweden) BK Häcken)
14	FW	JPN	Mike Havenaar (to (Netherlands) ADO Den Haag)
16	DF	FIN	Valtteri Moren (to (Belgium) Waasland-Beveren)
28	MF	FIN	Rasmus Schüller (to (Sweden) BK Häcken)
31	MF	FIN	Robin Lod (to (Greece) Panathinaikos)
35	GK	FIN	Saku-Pekka Sahlgren (loan to (Finland) KTP)

=== IFK Mariehamn ===
In:

No.	Pos.	Nation	Player

Out:

No.	Pos.	Nation	Player

=== Ilves ===
In:

No.	Pos.	Nation	Player

Out:

No.	Pos.	Nation	Player
—	FW	LBN	Mohammad Kdouh (to (Albania) Vllaznia Shköder)

=== KTP ===
In:

No.	Pos.	Nation	Player
33	GK	USA	Craig Hill (on loan from (Finland) Kultsu)
—	GK	FIN	Saku-Pekka Sahlgren (on loan from (Finland) HJK)

Out:

No.	Pos.	Nation	Player

=== KuPS ===
In:

No.	Pos.	Nation	Player

Out:

No.	Pos.	Nation	Player

=== RoPS ===
In:

No.	Pos.	Nation	Player
9	FW	JAM	Tremaine Stewart (from (Jamaica) Waterhouse)
19	MF	USA	Will John (free agent)
26	FW	FIN	Eero Markkanen (free agent)

Out:

No.	Pos.	Nation	Player
91	FW	CRO	Vilim Posinković (to (Greece) Kissamikos)

=== SJK ===
In:

No.	Pos.	Nation	Player
18	FW	FIN	Roope Riski (on loan from (Norway) Haugesund)
28	MF	BRA	Allan (on loan from (England) Liverpool)

Out:

No.	Pos.	Nation	Player
28	MF	BRA	Allan (loan return to (England) Liverpool)

=== VPS ===
In:

No.	Pos.	Nation	Player
28	MF	JAM	Andre Clennon (on loan from (Jamaica) Arnett Gardens)

Out:

No.	Pos.	Nation	Player

== 2015 Ykkönen ==
Note: Flags indicate national team as has been defined under FIFA eligibility rules. Players may hold more than one non-FIFA nationality.

=== AC Oulu ===
In:

No.	Pos.	Nation	Player

Out:

No.	Pos.	Nation	Player

=== EIF ===
In:

No.	Pos.	Nation	Player

Out:

No.	Pos.	Nation	Player

=== FC Haka ===
In:

No.	Pos.	Nation	Player

Out:

No.	Pos.	Nation	Player

=== FC Jazz ===
In:

No.	Pos.	Nation	Player

Out:

No.	Pos.	Nation	Player

=== JJK ===
In:

No.	Pos.	Nation	Player

Out:

No.	Pos.	Nation	Player

=== MP ===
In:

No.	Pos.	Nation	Player
15	MF	BRA	Adriano Strack (from (Serbia) Novi Pazar)

Out:

No.	Pos.	Nation	Player

=== PK-35 Vantaa ===
In:

No.	Pos.	Nation	Player

Out:

No.	Pos.	Nation	Player

=== PS Kemi ===
In:

No.	Pos.	Nation	Player

Out:

No.	Pos.	Nation	Player

=== TPS ===
In:

No.	Pos.	Nation	Player

Out:

No.	Pos.	Nation	Player

=== VIFK ===
In:

No.	Pos.	Nation	Player

Out:

No.	Pos.	Nation	Player

== See also ==
- 2015 Veikkausliiga
- 2015 Ykkönen
