= Hakanpää =

Hakanpää is a Finnish surname. Notable people with the surname include:

- Jani Hakanpää (born 1992), Finnish ice hockey player
- Rami Hakanpää (born 1978), Finnish footballer
