= Jyrki =

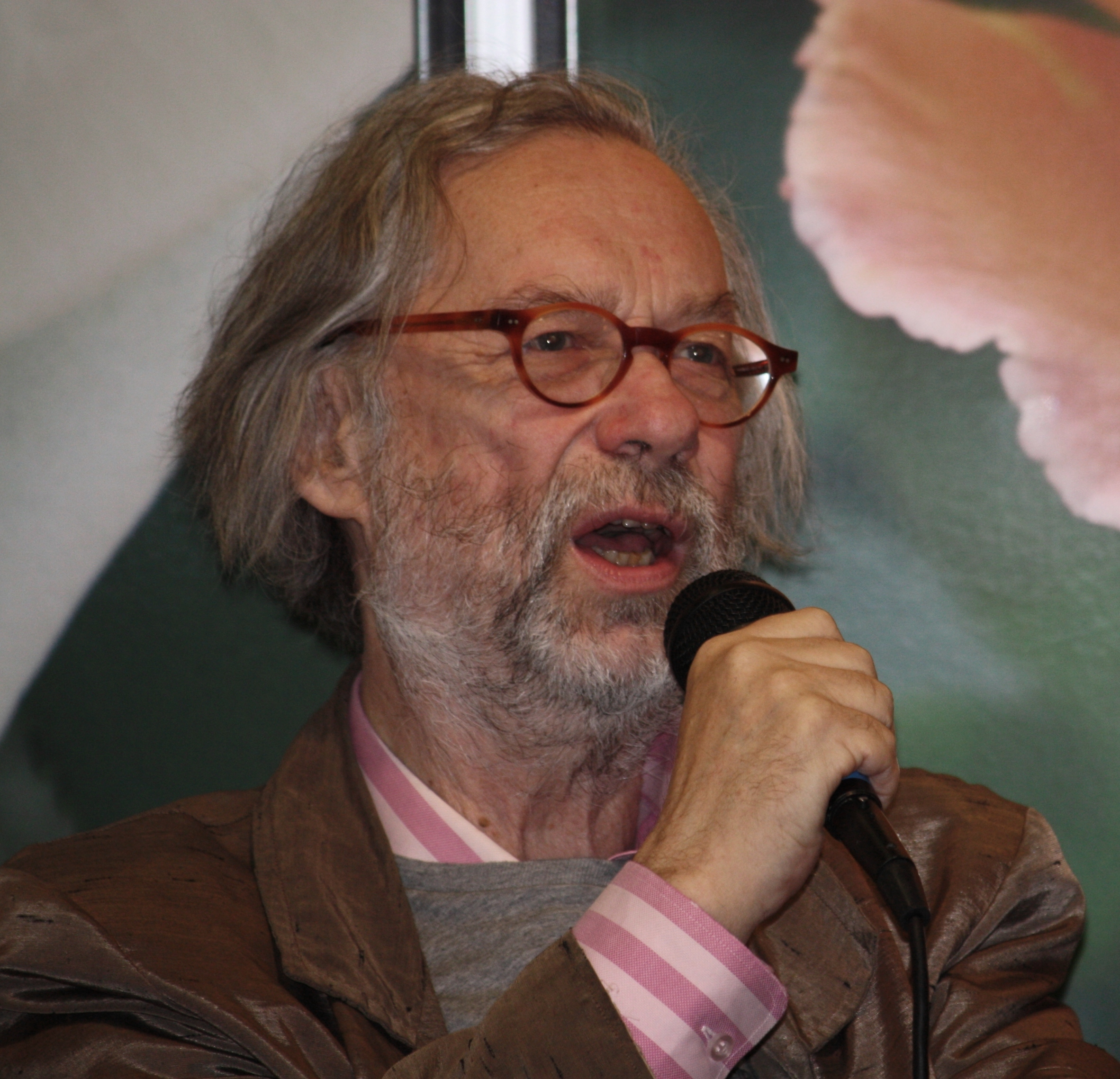
Finnish poet and painter Jyrki Pellinen at Helsinki Book Fair 2010

Jyrki is a Finnish masculine given name and may refer to:

== People ==
- Jyrki 69 (born 1968), the lead vocalist for Finnish rock band The 69 Eyes
- Jyrki Blom (born 1962), retired Finnish javelin thrower
- Jyrki Hämäläinen (1942–2008), Finnish magazine editor
- Jyrki Hakala (born 1960), Finnish sprint canoeist
- Jyrki Heliskoski (1945–2020), Finnish football coach
- Jyrki Järvi (born 1966), Finnish sailor and Olympic champion
- Jyrki Järvilehto (born 1966), better known as "JJ Lehto", a Finnish race car driver
- Jyrki Jokipakka (born 1991), Finnish professional ice hockey defenceman
- Jyrki Kähkönen (born 1967), retired Finnish athlete (110 metres hurdles)
- Jyrki Kasvi (born 1964), Finnish politician
- Jyrki Katainen (born 1971), the Prime Minister of Finland, chairman of the country's National Coalition Party
- Jyrki Kiiskinen (born 1963), Finnish writer, recipient of the Eino Leino Prize in 1993
- Jyrki Louhi, Finnish professional ice hockey forward
- Jyrki Lumme (born 1966), retired Finnish professional ice hockey defenceman
- Jyrki Niskanen, operatic tenor from Finland
- Jyrki Otila (1941–2003), Finnish quiz show judge, Member of the European Parliament
- Jyrki Parantainen (born 1962), Finnish photographer
- Jyrki Pellinen (born 1940), Finnish writer and visual artist
- Jyrki Ponsiluoma (born 1966), Swedish cross country skier
- Jyrki Saranpää (born 1983), Finnish football player
- Jyrki Seppä (born 1961), professional ice hockey player
- Jyrki Välivaara (born 1976), Finnish professional ice hockey defenceman
- Jyrki Yrttiaho (1952–2021), Finnish politician, member of the Finnish Parliament

== Other ==
- Jyrki (TV show), Finnish TV show about popular music
