= Sebastian Mannström =

Finnish footballer (born 1988)

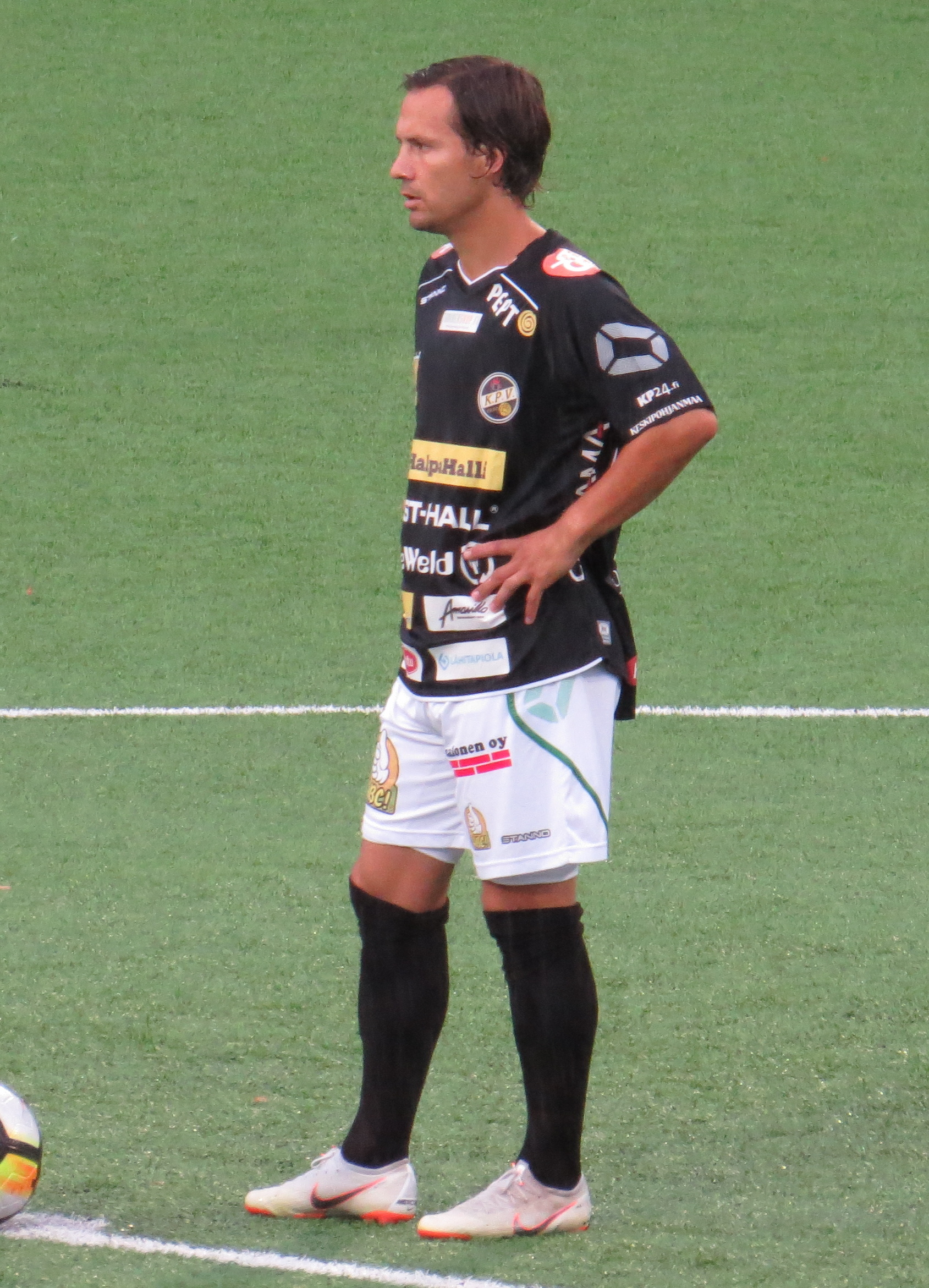
- Mannström with KPV in 2018

Personal information
- Date of birth: 29 October 1988 (age 38)
- Place of birth: Kokkola, Finland
- Height: 1.69 m (5 ft 6 1/2 in)
- Position: Winger

Team information
- Current team: KPV
- Number: 8

Youth career
- 2000–2004: GBK

Senior career*
Years	Team	Apps	(Gls)
2004–2007	GBK	78	(12)
2008–2011	Jaro	68	(11)
2011–2015	HJK	101	(15)
2015	SV Elversberg	10	(1)
2015–2016	Inter Turku	30	(2)
2016–2018	Stuttgarter Kickers	48	(6)
2018–2023	KPV	103	(12)
2024–	GBK	5	(4)

International career^{‡}
2004	Finland U16	5	(0)
2006	Finland U18	1	(0)
2008	Finland U20	3	(0)
2009–2010	Finland U21	14	(1)
2011–2013	Finland	5	(0)
Medal record
GBK
First place	Kakkonen	2006
HJK Helsinki
First place	Veikkausliiga	2011
First place	Finnish Cup	2011
Second place	Finnish League Cup	2012
First place	Veikkausliiga	2012
First place	Veikkausliiga	2013
First place	Veikkausliiga	2014
First place	Finnish Cup	2014
Elversberg
Third place	Regionalliga Südwest	2015
First place	Saarland Cup	2015
Inter Turku
Second place	Finnish Cup	2015
Stuttgarter Kickers
Second place	Württemberg Cup	2017
KPV
Second place	Ykkönen	2018
- * Club domestic league appearances and goals as of 27 November 2023 ‡ National team caps and goals as of 3 February 2013

Sebastian Mannström (born 29 October 1988) is a Finnish professional football winger who plays for Kakkonen club GBK Kokkola and has represented the Finnish national team. Mannström was born in Kokkola, Finland. He began his senior club career playing for GBK, before making his league debut for Jaro at age 19 in 2008.

Mannström made his international debut for Finland in October 2011, at the age of 22.

== Club career ==
=== GBK ===
Mannström started his footballing career at his local GBK which he represented on senior level for 4 seasons.

=== Jaro ===
Mannström was snapped by FF Jaro in 2008. At Jaro he was an instant first-choice, making in total of 68 appearances and 11 goals during three years with Jakobstad based club.

=== HJK ===
On 11 November 2010 HJK announced that they had signed Mannström from Jaro on a two-year contract.

=== Elversberg ===
On 1 January 2015 it was announced that Mannström had signed a contract with SV Elversberg.

=== Inter Turku ===
On 17 August 2015, Mannström signed a contract with Inter Turku.

=== Stuttgarter Kickers ===
On 19 August 2016, he joined Stuttgarter Kickers from Inter Turku to reunite with former manager Alfred Kaminski from his spell at SV Elversberg.

=== KPV ===
On 15 June 2018 KPV gave a press release that Mannström would return to Kokkola.

== International career ==
He made his debut for the Finnish national team on 9 February 2011 in a friendly match in Jules Ottenstadion, Ghent against Belgium.

== Personal life ==
Mannström's cousin is a former footballers Patrick Byskata.

== Career statistics ==
=== International ===
Statistics accurate as of matches played on 26 January 2013

National team	Year	Competitive		Friendly		Total	
National team	Year	Apps	Goals	Apps	Goals	Apps	Goals
Finland	2011	0	0	2	0	2	0
Finland	2012	0	0	1	0	1	0
Finland	2013	0	0	2	0	2	0
Total		0	0	5	0	5	0

== Honours and achievements ==
=== Club ===
GBK

- Kakkonen: 2006

HJK Helsinki

- Veikkausliiga: 2011, 2012, 2013, 2014
- Finnish Cup: 2011, 2014

Elversberg

- Saarland Cup: 2015
