= Tuomas Peltonen =

Finnish footballer (born 1977)

Personal information
- Date of birth: 9 October 1977 (age 49)
- Place of birth: Lahti, Finland
- Height: 1.82 m (5 ft 11 1/2 in)
- Position: Goalkeeper

Senior career*
Years	Team	Apps	(Gls)
2001–2004	FC Honka	62	(0)
2004–2005	FC Hämeenlinna	23	(0)
2005–2013	FC Honka	158	(0)
Medal record
Honka
Runner-up	Finnish Cup	2007
Runner-up	Finnish Cup	2008
Runner-up	Veikkausliiga	2008
Runner-up	Veikkausliiga	2009
Winner	Finnish League Cup	2010
Winner	Finnish League Cup	2011
Winner	Finnish Cup	2012
- * Club domestic league appearances and goals

Tuomas Peltonen (born 19 October 1977) is a Finnish former football player who played as a goalkeeper.

== Honours ==
=== Club ===
FC Honka

- Veikkausliiga Runners-up (2): 2008, 2009
- Finnish Cup: 2012
- Finnish League Cup (2): 2010, 2011
- Ykkönen: 2005
