= Patrick Byskata =

Finnish footballer (born 1990)

Personal information
- Full name: Patrick Michael Byskata
- Date of birth: 13 August 1990 (age 36)
- Place of birth: Kokkola, Finland
- Height: 1.78 m (5 ft 10 in)
- Position: Midfielder

Team information
- Current team: KPV
- Number: 90

Youth career
- 2001–2007: KPV

Senior career*
Years	Team	Apps	(Gls)
2008–2009	GBK	40	(0)
2010	KPV	26	(1)
2011	Jaro	32	(0)
2012–2014	IFK Mariehamn	73	(3)
2014	Jaro	7	(0)
2015	KPV	26	(2)
2016–2018	Bryne	45	(0)
2018	KPV	26	(1)
2019	KPV	14	(0)
2020	Brattvåg	3	(0)
2021	Jaro	10	(0)
2022–2023	KPV	21	(1)
- * Club domestic league appearances and goals as of 27 November 2023

Patrick Michael Byskata (born 13 August 1990) is a Finnish former football player.

Byskata is the cousin of HJK footballer Sebastian Mannström.

== Career ==
On 3 November 2011 IFK Mariehamn signed Byskata from FF Jaro on a two-year contract.

In 2016 he signed for Bryne FK, where he played alongside Erling Haaland.

After leaving KPV in January 2019, he returned to the club again six months later.

On 14 December 2021, Byskata returned to KPV once again, signing a contract for the 2023 and 2024 seasons.

== Career statistics ==
As of 1 September 2024.

Appearances and goals by club, season and competition
Club	Season	League			Cup (Note: Includes Suomen Cup and Norwegian Cup)		League cup (Note: Includes Finnish League Cup and Ykköscup)		Europe		Total	
Club	Season	Division	Apps	Goals	Apps	Goals	Apps	Goals	Apps	Goals	Apps	Goals
GBK	2008	Kakkonen										
GBK	2009	Kakkonen										
GBK	Total		40	0	0	0	0	0	0	0	40	0
KPV	2010	Ykkönen	26	1	1	0	–		–		27	1
Jaro	2011	Veikkausliiga	32	0	0	0	2	0	–		34	0
IFK Mariehamn	2012	Veikkausliiga	29	1	4	1	6	0	–		39	2
IFK Mariehamn	2013	Veikkausliiga	30	2	3	0	0	0	2 (Note: Appearances in UEFA Europa League)	0	35	2
IFK Mariehamn	2014	Veikkausliiga	14	0	1	0	0	0	–		15	0
IFK Mariehamn	Total		73	3	8	1	6	0	2	0	89	4
Jaro	2014	Veikkausliiga	7	0	–		–		–		7	0
KPV	2015	Kakkonen	26	2	3	0	–		–		29	2
Bryne	2016	1. divisjon	22	0	1	1	–		–		23	1
Bryne	2017	2. divisjon	23	0	2	0	–		–		25	0
Bryne	Total		45	0	3	1	0	0	0	0	48	1
Bryne 2	2016	3. divisjon	5	0	–		–		–		5	0
Bryne 2	2017	3. divisjon	1	0	–		–		–		1	0
Bryne 2	Total		6	0	0	0	0	0	0	0	6	0
KPV	2018	Ykkönen	28	1	3	0	–		–		31	1
KPV	2019	Veikkausliiga	15	0	0	0	–		–		15	0
KPV	Total		43	1	3	0	0	0	0	0	46	1
Brattvåg	2020	2. divisjon	3	0	0	0	–		–		3	0
Jaro	2021	Ykkönen	24	0	0	0	–		–		24	0
KPV	2022	Ykkönen	11	1	0	0	–		–		11	1
KPV	2023	Ykkönen	10	0	3	0	2	1	–		15	1
KPV	Total		21	1	3	0	2	1	0	0	26	2
Career total			346	8	21	2	10	1	2	0	379	11
