= Santeri Mäkinen =

Finnish footballer (born 1992)

Personal information
- Date of birth: 9 April 1992 (age 34)
- Height: 1.83 m (6 ft 0 in)
- Position: Midfielder

Team information
- Current team: TPS
- Number: 25

Senior career*
Years	Team	Apps	(Gls)
2010–2015	TPS	56	(2)

International career
- Finland U-15
- Finland U-16
- Finland U-17
- Finland U-18
- Finland U-19
- Finland U-20
- * Club domestic league appearances and goals as of 31 December 2015

Santeri Mäkinen (born 9 April 1992) is a retired Finnish football player who played for Finnish club TPS.

On 7 March 2016, he terminated his active career due to chronic knee injuries.
