= Ilya Vaganov =

Russian footballer

Personal information
- Full name: Ilya Sergeyevich Vaganov
- Date of birth: 15 January 1989 (age 37)
- Place of birth: Leningrad, Russian SFSR
- Height: 1.85 m (6 ft 1 in)
- Positions: Defender; midfielder

Youth career
- Moskovskaya Zastava St. Petersburg

Senior career*
Years	Team	Apps	(Gls)
2006	FC Svarog SMU-303 St. Petersburg		
2007	Jakobstads BK		(3)
2008	FC Khimki	0	(0)
2009–2010	Jakobstads BK		
2011–2012	FF Jaro	47	(4)
2011	→ Jakobstads BK (loan)	2	(0)
2013	FC Rus St. Petersburg	7	(0)
2014–2015	FF Jaro	60	(5)
2016	FC Berkut Armyansk		
2016–2017	FC Dynamo Bryansk	19	(1)
2017–2019	FC Ryazan	47	(0)
2019–2020	FC Chernomorets Novorossiysk	14	(0)
2020–2021	FC Volna Nizhny Novgorod Oblast	9	(0)
- * Club domestic league appearances and goals

Ilya Sergeyevich Vaganov (Russian: Илья Сергеевич Ваганов; born 15 January 1989) is a Russian former football player.

== Club career ==
He made his debut in the Russian Second Division for FC Rus Saint Petersburg on 15 July 2013 in a game against FC Spartak Kostroma.
