= Toni Kolehmainen =

Finnish footballer (born 1988)

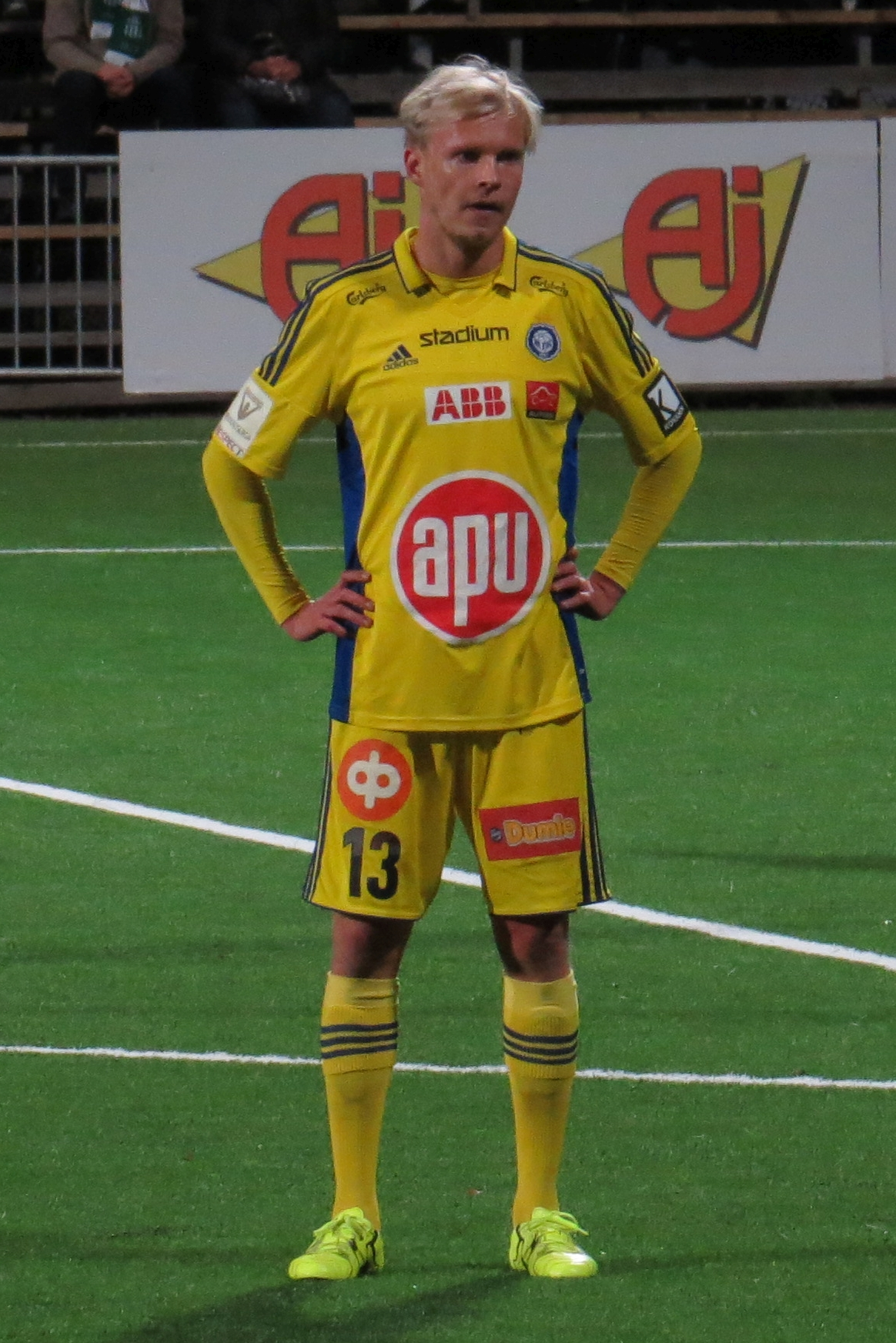
- Kolehmainen with HJK in 2015

Personal information
- Date of birth: 20 July 1988 (age 38)
- Place of birth: Oulu, Finland
- Height: 1.77 m (5 ft 9 1/2 in)
- Position: Defensive midfielder

Youth career
- 2004–2005: Blackburn Rovers

Senior career*
Years	Team	Apps	(Gls)
2005	OLS	14	(0)
2006–2007	AC Oulu	25	(3)
2007–2009	AZ Alkmaar	0	(0)
2009	AC Oulu	5	(1)
2010–2012	TPS	72	(7)
2012–2015	Hønefoss	43	(0)
2015–2017	HJK	36	(1)
2017	Wisła Puławy	10	(0)

International career
2008–2010	Finland U21	6	(0)
2012–2015	Finland	10	(3)
- * Club domestic league appearances and goals

Toni Kolehmainen (born 20 July 1988) is a Finnish former professional footballer who played as a midfielder.

He had previously played for AZ in Alkmaar, Netherlands. Kolehmainen also played in Blackburn Rovers' youth academy during 2004–05.

== Early career ==
After ending his stay with Blackburn Rovers' youth academy Toni returned to Finland to play for OLS Oulu. In 2006, he joined town rival AC Oulu and helped the club gain promotion to the Veikkausliiga. His play with AC Oulu led to interest from Dutch Eredivisie club AZ Alkmaar who signed Kolehmainen in 2007.

== Club career ==
During his time with AZ he was primarily a member of the reserve squad. In 2008, he was promoted to the first team squad by Louis van Gaal and made his debut in a 3-0 KNVB Cup victory over Achilles '29. Once the 2009 season concluded Kolehmainen did not exercise the option on his contract with AZ and returned to AC Oulu for a brief stay, which led to a promotion after the season.

Kolehmainen however left Oulu and went on signing a two-year contract with TPS in February 2010.

After some promising performances, Kolehmainen was spotted by Hønefoss BK, where he would reunite with a TPS teammate Riku Riski. A long-term contract was signed on 31 August 2012.

Kolehmainen retired in 2017, finishing his career at Polish side Wisła Puławy.

== International career ==
On 22 January 2012 Kolehmainen scored for Finland in his senior level debut, in a friendly match against Trinidad and Tobago.

== Career statistics ==
=== Club ===
As of 1 September 2024.

Appearances and goals by club, season and competition
Club	Season	League			Cup (Note: Includes Suomen Cup, KNVB Beker, Norwegian Cup)		League cup (Note: Includes Finnish League Cup)		Europe		Total	
Club	Season	Division	Apps	Goals	Apps	Goals	Apps	Goals	Apps	Goals	Apps	Goals
OLS	2005	Ykkönen	14	0	–		–		–		14	0
AC Oulu	2006	Ykkönen	25	3	–		–		–		25	3
AZ Alkmaar	2008–09	Eredivisie	0	0	0	0	–		–		0	0
AC Oulu	2009	Ykkönen	5	1	–		–		–		5	1
TPS	2010	Veikkausliiga	21	1	1	0	0	0	4 (Note: Appearances in UEFA Europa League)	1	26	2
TPS	2011	Veikkausliiga	29	5	0	0	1	0	1	0	31	5
TPS	2012	Veikkausliiga	22	1	1	0	6	1	–		29	2
TPS	Total		72	7	2	0	7	1	5	1	86	!9
Hønefoss	2012	Tippeligaen	8	0	–		–		–		8	0
Hønefoss	2013	Tippeligaen	8	0	–		–		–		8	0
Hønefoss	2014	1. divisjon	23	0	1	0	–		–		24	0
Hønefoss	2015	1. divisjon	4	0	0	0	–		–		4	0
Hønefoss	Total		43	0	1	0	0	0	0	0	44	0
Hønefoss 2	2013	3. divisjon	4	1	–		–		–		4	1
HJK Helsinki	2015	Veikkausliiga	21	1	1	0	0	0	1	0	23	1
HJK Helsinki	2016	Veikkausliiga	15	0	2	1	0	0	4	0	21	1
HJK Helsinki	Total		36	1	3	1	0	0	5	0	44	2
Wisła Puławy	2016–17	I liga	10	0	0	0	–		–		10	0
Career total			211	13	6	1	7	1	10	1	234	16

=== International ===
Appearances and goals by national team and year
National team	Year	Apps	Goals
Norway	2012	6	3
Norway	2013	1	0
Norway	2014	2	0
Norway	2015	1	0
Total		10	3

Scores and results list Finland's goal tally first, score column indicates score after each Kolehmainen goal.

List of international goals scored by Toni Kolehmainen
No.	Date	Venue	Opponent	Score	Result	Competition
1	22 January 2012	Hasely Crawford Stadium, Port of Spain, Trinidad and Tobago	Trinidad and Tobago	2–2	3–2	Friendly
2	3 June 2012	Võru Stadium, Võru, Estonia	Latvia	1–0	1–1 (5–6 p)	2012 Baltic Cup
3	14 November 2012	GSP Stadium, Strovolos, Cyprus	Cyprus	3–0	3–0	Friendly

== Honours ==
TPS Turku

- Finnish Cup: 2010
- Finnish League Cup: 2012

HJK

- Finnish League Cup: 2015

Individual

- Veikkausliiga Player of the Month: September 2010
