= Tillmann Grove =

German footballer (born 1988)

Personal information
- Date of birth: 9 March 1988 (age 38)
- Place of birth: Hamburg, Germany
- Height: 1.74 m (5 ft 9 in)
- Position: Defender

Youth career
- Hamburger SV

Senior career*
Years	Team	Apps	(Gls)
2006–2009	Hamburger SV II	25	(0)
2009–2012	FF Jaro	52	(2)
2012–2013	Eintracht Norderstedt	31	(0)
Total		108	(2)

International career
2003	Germany U16		
- * Club domestic league appearances and goals

Tillmann Grove (born 9 March 1988) is a German former professional footballer who played as a defender. He played for Finnish Veikkausliiga side FF Jaro.
