= Niko Kukka =

Finnish footballer (born 1987)

Personal information
- Full name: Niko Antero Kukka
- Date of birth: 30 September 1987 (age 39)
- Place of birth: Helsinki, Finland
- Height: 1.75 m (5 ft 9 in)
- Position: Left back

Team information
- Current team: MYPA
- Number: 9

Youth career
- –2006: HJK Helsinki

Senior career*
Years	Team	Apps	(Gls)
2004–2006	Klubi-04	43	(4)
2007	FC Honka	6	(0)
2007	→ Atlantis FC (loan)	1	(0)
2008–2010	AC Oulu	69	(5)
2011–2012	MYPA	36	(7)
2013	IFK Mariehamn	19	(1)
2014–	PK-35	0	(0)

International career
	Finland youth	30	(0)
- * Club domestic league appearances and goals as of 6 May 2012

Niko Antero Kukka (born 30 September 1987) is a Finnish professional football defender who currently plays for the Veikkausliiga side MYPA in Finland.

Kukka started his footballing career at local HJK, but never got past its reserves. He was signed by rivals FC Honka for the 2007 season, but as he only managed to play a handful of games for the Espoo based club, he was loaned out to Ykkönen side Atlantis FC for the rest of the season.

After leaving FC Honka in 2008, Kukka joined AC Oulu and played a crucial part for the team as they won the promotion to Veikkausliiga for the 2009 season. After being a first choice left back for Oulu for three years, Kukka decided to join MYPA. On 17 November 2010, he signed a one-year deal with the club.
