= Timi Lahti =

Finnish footballer (born 1990)

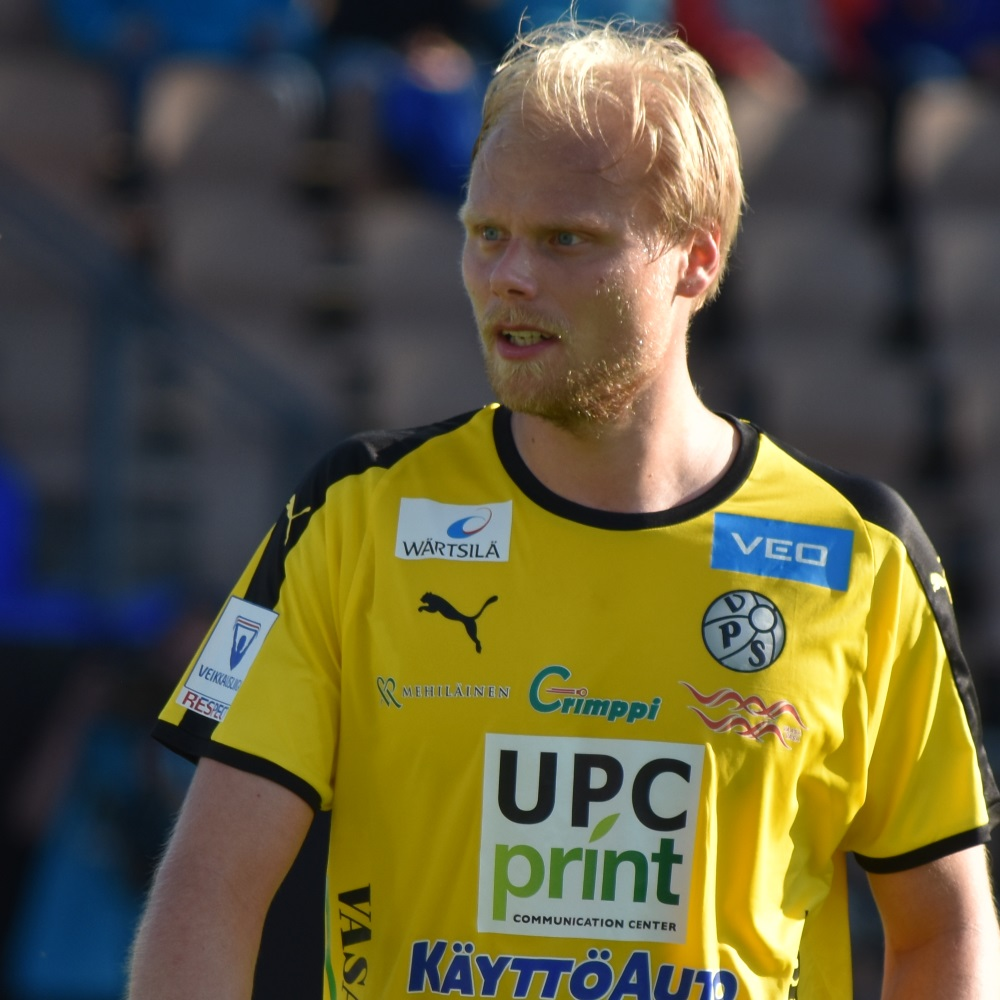
- Lahti with VPS in 2018.

Personal information
- Full name: Timi Tapio Lahti
- Date of birth: 28 June 1990 (age 36)
- Place of birth: Jyväskylä, Finland
- Height: 1.85 m (6 ft 1 in)
- Position: Centre back

Youth career
- 1995–2006: JJK
- 2007: Haka
- 2007–2010: Padova

Senior career*
Years	Team	Apps	(Gls)
2010	Padova	0	(0)
2010	→ Belluno (loan)	19	(0)
2010–2011	Haka	24	(0)
2011	→ Belluno (loan)	9	(0)
2011	→ HJK (loan)	8	(0)
2012−2013	HJK	29	(0)
2014–2019	VPS	140	(7)
2020–2021	Lahti	40	(2)
2022–2023	IFK Mariehamn	45	(3)

International career
2008	Finland U18	8	(0)
2009	Finland U19	7	(0)
2010–2012	Finland U21	12	(1)
- * Club domestic league appearances and goals as of 25 March 2024

Timi Tapio Lahti (born 28 June 1990) is a Finnish former professional footballer who played as a centre back. Since 2015, Lahti has worked for Jalkapallon Pelaajayhdistys (JPY), "Finnish Football Players Union".

== Career ==
=== Club career ===
A product of his local club JJK, Lahti finished his grooming at FC Haka. In 2007, he was signed by Italian club Padova, where he stayed for three years and only played for the club's youth team. In January 2010, he joined A.C. Belluno 1905 on loan from Padova where he had a successful loan stint in Serie D with 19 appearances.

However, in 2010 Lahti decided to return to Finland was signed a two-year contract with his former club Haka. However, he returned to A.C. Belluno 1905 on loan in December 2010 when the Finnish league had ended. In August 2011 he was loaned to the reigning Finnish champions, HJK with an option-to-buy after the season. He made his debut for HJK on 18 August 2011 playing as a starter against Schalke 04 in the Europa League playoff round as the Finns won by 2–0.

After his loan expired after the 2011 season he was signed permanently by HJK on a 2+1 year-contract.

During his time with the Helsinki side Lahti won three consecutive Finnish league championships from 2011 to 2013. On 1 November 2013 he was signed by his current club VPS on a 2+1 year-contract. He left the club at the end of the 2019 and joined FC Lahti for the 2020 season, signing a deal until the end of 2021.

For the 2022 season, he joined IFK Mariehamn. After the 2023 season, Lahti announced his retirement from the professional playing career.

After his retirement, Lahti has played futsal for Kampuksen Dynamo in his hometown Jyväskylä.

== Career statistics ==
As of 1 September 2024.

Appearances and goals by club, season and competition
Club	Season	League			Cup (Note: Includes Suomen Cup)		League cup (Note: Includes Finnish League Cup)		Europe		Total	
Club	Season	Division	Apps	Goals	Apps	Goals	Apps	Goals	Apps	Goals	Apps	Goals
Padova	2009–10	Serie B	0	0	0	0	–		–		0	0
Belluno (loan)	2009–10	Serie D	19	0	0	0	–		–		19	0
Haka	2010	Veikkausliiga	7	0	–		–		–		7	0
Haka	2011	Veikkausliiga	17	0	1	0	–		–		18	0
Haka	Total		24	0	1	0	0	0	0	0	25	0
Belluno (loan)	2010–11	Serie D	9	0	–		–		–		9	0
HJK (loan)	2011	Veikkausliiga	8	0	–		–		2 (Note: Appearances in UEFA Europa League)	0	10	0
HJK	2012	Veikkausliiga	25	0	3	0	8	1	6 (Note: Appearances in UEFA Champions League and UEFA Europa League)	0	42	1
HJK	2013	Veikkausliiga	4	0	1	0	6	0	0	0	11	0
HJK	Total		29	0	4	0	14	1	6	0	53	1
VPS	2014	Veikkausliiga	18	1	1	0	5	0	0	0	24	1
VPS	2015	Veikkausliiga	27	3	1	0	0	0	2	0	30	3
VPS	2016	Veikkausliiga	23	1	0	0	–		–		23	1
VPS	2017	Veikkausliiga	21	0	4	0	–		4	0	29	0
VPS	2018	Veikkausliiga	31	0	2	0	–		–		33	0
VPS	2019	Veikkausliiga	20	2	4	0	–		–		24	2
VPS	Career total		140	7	12	0	5	0	6	0	163	7
Lahti	2020	Veikkausliiga	21	2	3	0	–		–		24	2
Lahti	2021	Veikkausliiga	19	0	3	0	–		–		22	0
Lahti	Total		40	2	6	0	0	0	0	0	46	2
IFK Mariehamn	2022	Veikkausliiga	20	1	3	0	3	0	–		26	1
IFK Mariehamn	2023	Veikkausliiga	25	2	3	0	5	0	–		33	2
IFK Mariehamn	Total		45	3	6	0	8	0	0	0	59	3
Career total			314	12	29	0	27	1	14	0	384	13
