= Joel Perovuo =

Finnish footballer (born 1985)

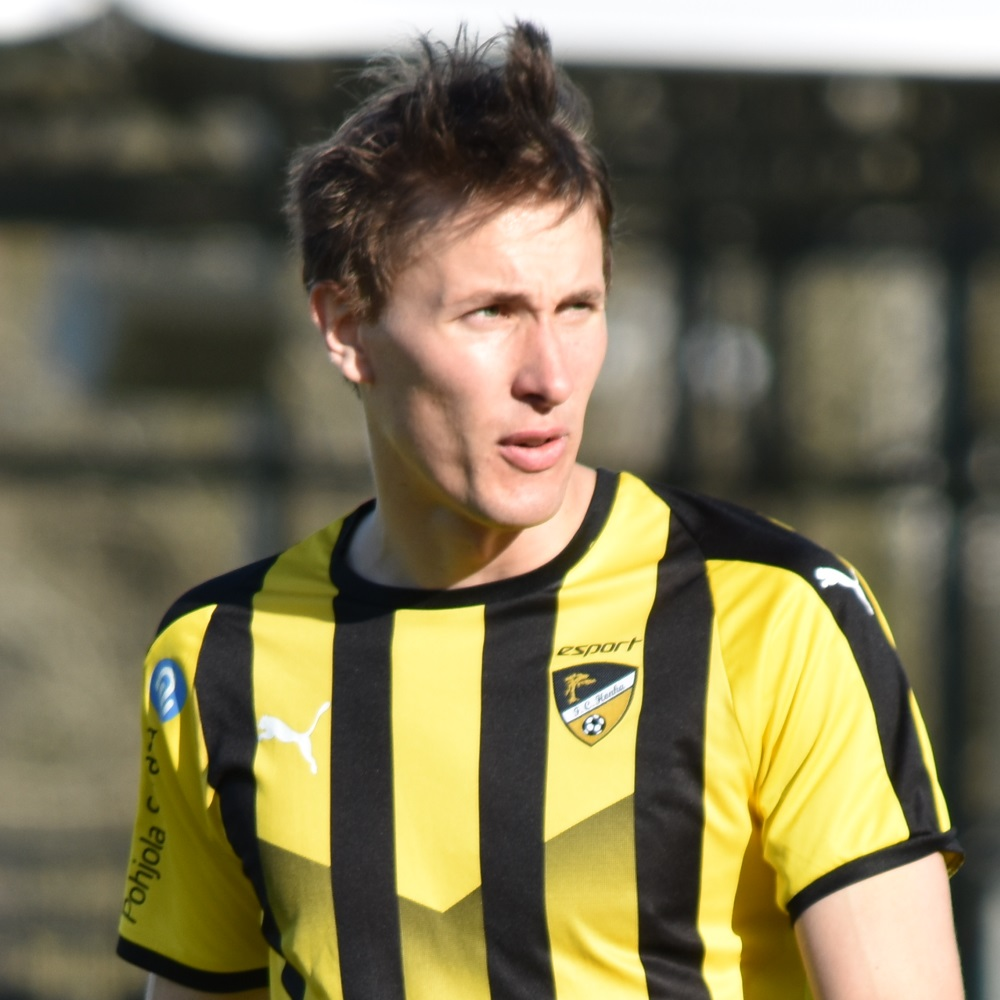
- Perovuo with Honka in 2018

Personal information
- Full name: Joel Iljits Perovuo
- Date of birth: 11 August 1985 (age 41)
- Place of birth: Helsinki, Finland
- Height: 1.87 m (6 ft 1 1/2 in)
- Position: Midfielder

Team information
- Current team: Honka (assistant coach)

Youth career
- –2004: EPS

Senior career*
Years	Team	Apps	(Gls)
2004–2009	Honka	100	(10)
2010–2011	Djurgården	33	(1)
2011–2013	HJK	58	(4)
2014	Jagiellonia Białystok	4	(0)
2014	Jagiellonia Białystok II	7	(0)
2014	HJK	10	(0)
2015–2019	Honka	117	(12)
2020	Gnistan	15	(1)
Total		344	(27)

International career
2010	Finland	2	(0)

Managerial career
- 2025–: Honka (assistant)
- * Club domestic league appearances and goals

Joel Iljits Perovuo (born 11 August 1985) is a Finnish football coach and a former professional footballer who played as a midfielder. He is currently an assistant coach of Honka. Besides Finland, he also played in Sweden and Poland.

== Career ==
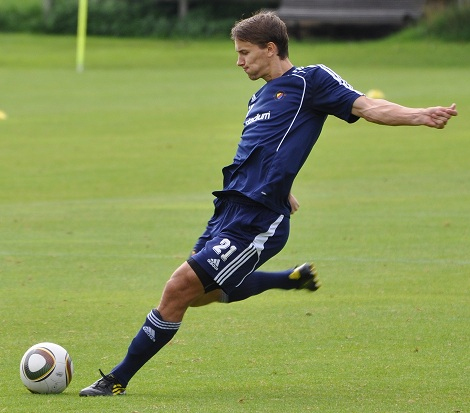
Perovuo with Djurgården in 2011

Perovuo began his career with Espoon PS in the youth side, before moving to FC Honka. He gradually became an important player in the Honka team. In December 2009, Djurgården announced that Perovuo had signed with the Swedish team.

On 12 August 2011 it was announced that Perovuo had signed for the reigning Finnish champions, HJK, for 2 1/2 years. He made his debut for HJK on 18 August as he came on as a substitute in a 2–0 home victory over Schalke in the Europa League playoff-round.

In 2015, Perovuo returned to FC Honka after the team was relegated to Kakkonen due to financial problems.

== International career ==
On 11 October 2009, Perovuo was called up by the Finland national team. He made his first appearance for Finland at senior level in a 0–2 friendly loss against South Korea on 18 January 2010. He was in the starting line-up, but was replaced by Paulus Arajuuri in the 84th minute.

== Career statistics ==
As of 1 September 2024.

Appearances and goals by club, season and competition
Club	Season	League			Cup (Note: Includes Suomen Cup, Svenska Cupen and Polish Cup)		League cup (Note: Includes Finnish League Cup)		Europe		Total	
Club	Season	Division	Apps	Goals	Apps	Goals	Apps	Goals	Apps	Goals	Apps	Goals
Honka	2004	Ykkönen	6	1	–		–		–		6	1
Honka	2005	Ykkönen	13	0	–		–		–		13	0
Honka	2006	Veikkausliiga	21	0	–		–		–		21	0
Honka	2007	Veikkausliiga	15	3	1	0	–		4 (Note: Appearances in UEFA Intertoto Cup)	0	20	3
Honka	2008	Veikkausliiga	20	2	3	0	–		6 (Note: Appearances in UEFA Cup)	0	29	2
Honka	2009	Veikkausliiga	25	4	2	2	6	0	4 (Note: Appearances in UEFA Europa League)	1	37	7
Honka	Total		100	10	6	2	6	0	14	1	126	13
Djurgården	2010	Allsvenskan	23	1	1	0	–		–		24	1
Djurgården	2011	Allsvenskan	10	0	1	0	–		–		11	0
Djurgården	Total		33	1	2	0	0	0	0	0	35	1
HJK Helsinki	2011	Veikkausliiga	11	1	1	0	0	0	2	0	14	1
HJK Helsinki	2012	Veikkausliiga	25	1	1	0	8	1	6 (Note: Appearances in UEFA Champions League and UEFA Europa League)	1	40	3
HJK Helsinki	2013	Veikkausliiga	21	2	2	0	4	1	2 (Note: Appearances in UEFA Champions League)	0	29	3
HJK Helsinki	Total		57	4	4	0	12	2	10	1	83	7
Jagiellonia Białystok	2013–14	Ekstraklasa	4	0	2	0	–		–		6	0
Jagiellonia Białystok II	2013–14	III liga	7	0	–		–		–		7	0
HJK Helsinki	2014	Veikkausliiga	10	0	2	0	0	0	5	0	17	0
Honka	2015	Kakkonen	24	6	1	0	–		–		25	6
Honka	2016	Kakkonen	21	0	4	1	–		–		25	1
Honka	2017	Ykkönen	28	6	5	0	–		–		33	6
Honka	2018	Veikkausliiga	23	0	5	0	–		–		28	0
Honka	2019	Veikkausliiga	23	0	5	0	–		–		28	0
Honka	Total		119	12	20	1	0	0	0	0	139	13
Gnistan	2020	Ykkönen	15	1	5	0	–		–		20	1
Career total			345	28	41	3	18	2	29	2	433	35

== Honours ==
HJK

- Veikkausliiga: 2011, 2012, 2013, 2014
- Finnish Cup: 2011, 2014
