= Mathias Lindström =

Finnish footballer (born 1981)

Personal information
- Full name: Mathias Jarl Valentin Lindström
- Date of birth: 14 January 1981 (age 45)
- Place of birth: Houtskär, Finland
- Height: 6 ft 2 in (1.88 m)
- Position: Central defender

Youth career
- 1986–1991: VIFK
- 1991–2000: Pargas IF

Senior career*
Years	Team	Apps	(Gls)
2001–2004	Inter Turku	100	(8)
2005	AC Allianssi	18	(1)
2005	Fredrikstad	3	(0)
2006–2009	Tampere United	72	(5)
2009–2013	HJK	61	(4)
2013−2014	Inter Turku	24	(3)

International career
–1999	Finland U18	2	(0)
2001–2003	Finland U21	17	(4)
2008	Finland B	1	(0)
- * Club domestic league appearances and goals as of 25 November 2013

Mathias Jarl Valentin Lindström (born 14 January 1981) is a retired Finnish footballer, who played as a central defender. He has played for FC Inter Turku, AC Allianssi, Fredrikstad FK, Tampere United and HJK Helsinki. Lindström last represented FC Inter Turku.

He was a failure at Fredrikstad FK, where he was sent off in his second match and only played one minute as a substitute after that.

In his career, he has played 224 games and has scored 16 goals. He is the player with most Veikkausliiga titles, currently 7. Lindström won the Veikkausliiga with Tampere United in 2006 and 2007 and with HJK Helsinki 2009, 2010, 2011 and 2012. He also won the Finnish League Cup with AC Allianssi in 2005 and with Tampere United in 2009. He won the Finnish Cup with Tampere United in 2007 and with HJK Helsinki in 2011.

Mathias graduated with a bachelor's degree in economics from Åbo Akademi University in Turku. He is currently studying journalism (Bachelor's degree) at the Swedish School of Social Science at the University of Helsinki.

== Career statistics ==
As of 1 September 2024.

Appearances and goals by club, season and competition
Club	Season	League			Cup (Note: Includes Suomen Cup)		League cup		Europe		Total	
Club	Season	Division	Apps	Goals	Apps	Goals	Apps	Goals	Apps	Goals	Apps	Goals
Inter Turku	2001	Veikkausliiga	30	1	–		–		–		30	1
Inter Turku	2002	Veikkausliiga	28	3	–		–		–		28	3
Inter Turku	2003	Veikkausliiga	25	2	–		–		–		25	2
Inter Turku	2004	Veikkausliiga	17	2	–		–		–		17	2
Inter Turku	Total		100	8	0	0	0	0	0	0	100	8
AC Allianssi	2005	Veikkausliiga	18	0	–		–		4 (Note: Appearances in UEFA Cup)	0	22	0
Fredrikstad	2005	Tippeligaen	3	0	–		–		–		3	0
Fredrikstad 2	2005	3. divisjon	1	0	–		–		–		1	0
Hämeenlinna	2006	Ykkönen	2	0	–		–		–		2	0
Tampere United	2006	Veikkausliiga	13	1	–		–		–		13	1
Tampere United	2007	Veikkausliiga	21	1	1	0	–		8 (Note: Appearances in UEFA Champions League and UEFA Cup)	0	30	1
Tampere United	2008	Veikkausliiga	19	2	1	0	–		3 (Note: Appearances in UEFA Champions League)	0	23	2
Tampere United	2009	Veikkausliiga	20	1	1	0	6	0	–		27	1
Tampere United	Total		73	5	3	0	6	0	11	0	93	5
HJK	2009	Veikkausliiga	4	0	–		–		–		4	0
HJK	2010	Veikkausliiga	7	1	1	0	0	0	0	0	8	1
HJK	2011	Veikkausliiga	22	2	2	0	1	0	6 (Note: Appearances in UEFA Champions League and UEFA Europa League)	0	31	2
HJK	2012	Veikkausliiga	18	1	3	0	8	0	5	1	34	2
HJK	2013	Veikkausliiga	13	0	1	0	6	0	1	0	21	0
HJK	Total		64	4	7	0	15	0	12	1	98	5
Klubi 04	2010	Ykkönen	2	0	–		–		–		2	0
Inter Turku	2014	Veikkausliiga	26	3	4	0	5	1	–		35	4
Career total			289	20	14	0	26	1	27	1	356	22

== Honours ==
AC Allianssi

- Winner
  - Finnish League Cup: 2005

Tampere United

- Winner
  - Veikkausliiga: 2006, 2007
  - Finnish Cup: 2007
  - Finnish League Cup: 2009

HJK Helsinki

- Winner
  - Veikkausliiga: 2009, 2010, 2011, 2012, 2013
  - Finnish Cup: 2010 (Runner Up), 2011

Individual

- Finland U21 Best Player of the Year: 2002
- Veikkausliiga Defender of the Year: 2011
- Veikkausliiga All–Star Team (Pallokopla) : 2007, 2011, 2012
