= Hendrik Großöhmichen =

German footballer

Personal information
- Date of birth: 6 June 1985 (age 41)
- Place of birth: Hanover, West Germany
- Height: 1.90 m (6 ft 3 in)
- Position: Midfielder

Youth career
- 1991–2001: Heesseler SV
- 2001–2002: VfL Wolfsburg
- 2002–2004: Hannover 96

Senior career*
Years	Team	Apps	(Gls)
2004–2006	Hannover 96 II	42	(3)
2006–2008	VfL Osnabrück	24	(0)
2008–2009	Holstein Kiel	19	(0)
2010	1. FC Magdeburg	2	(0)
2010–2011	Hansa Rostock	8	(0)
2012	FC Lahti	16	(0)
2013–2014	VfB Oldenburg	19	(0)
2015–2017	Heesseler SV		
- * Club domestic league appearances and goals

Hendrik Großöhmichen (born 6 June 1985) is a German former professional footballer who played as a midfielder.
