= Kastriot Kastrati =

Finnish footballer (born 1993)

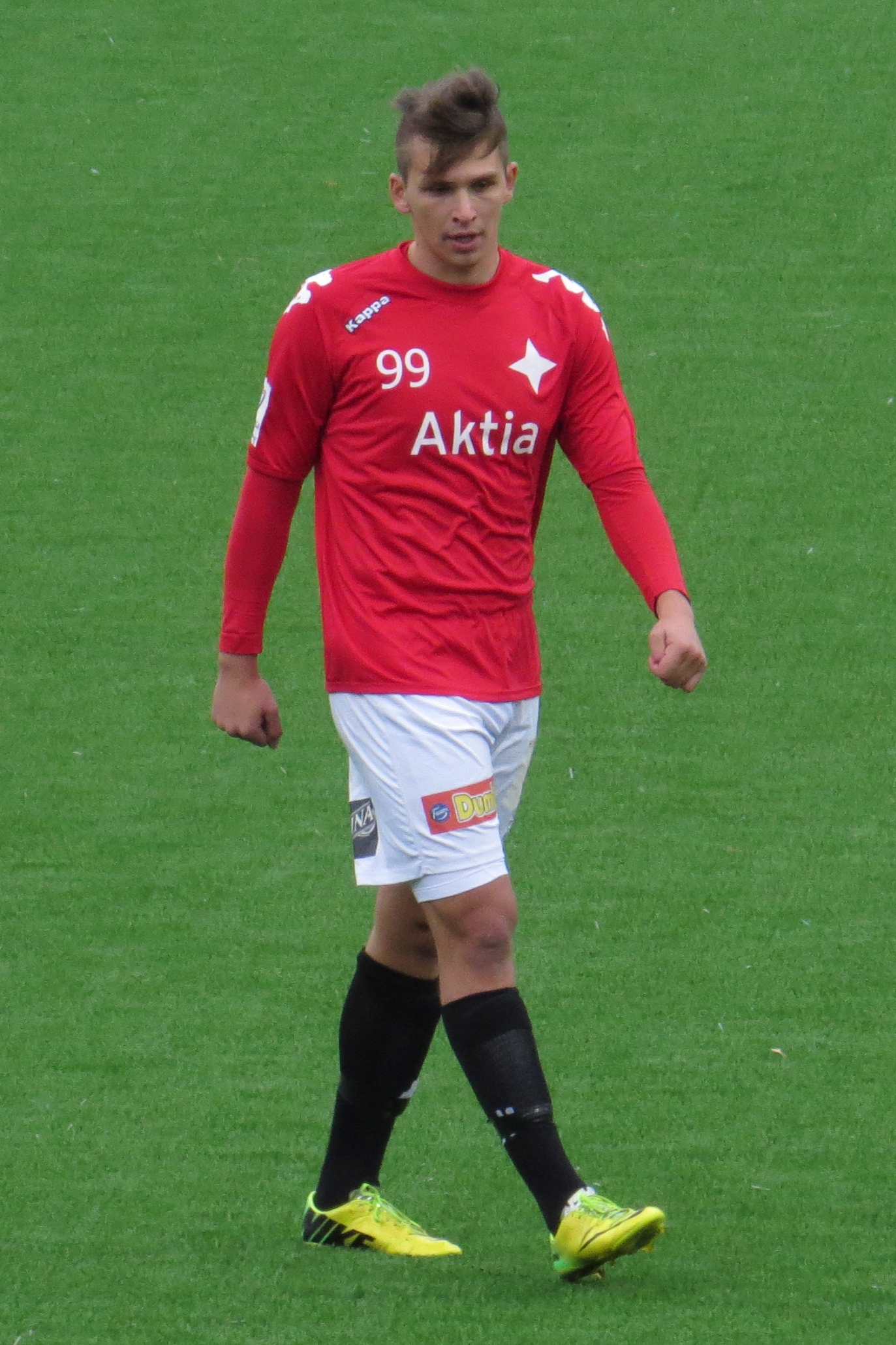

Personal information
- Date of birth: 10 February 1993 (age 33)
- Place of birth: Helsinki, Finland
- Height: 1.86 m (6 ft 1 in)
- Position: Forward

Team information
- Current team: PK-35 Vantaa
- Number: 11

Youth career
- FC Viikingit
- HJK

Senior career*
Years	Team	Apps	(Gls)
2011–	HJK	0	(0)
2011−2012	→ FC Haka (loan)	19	(3)
2013–2014	FC Honka	25	(7)
2014–2015	FC Myllypuro	17	(13)
2015–2016	HIFK	14	(2)
2016–	PK-35 Vantaa	1	(0)

International career
2009	Finland U-16	2	(1)
2011	Finland U-18	9	(1)
2011	Finland U-19		
2013	Finland U-21	4	(1)
- * Club domestic league appearances and goals as of 26 June 2015

Kastriot Kastrati (born 10 February 1993) is a Finnish footballer of Albanian descent currently playing for Finnish Veikkausliiga side PK-35 Vantaa.

Kastrati scored two goals in 2011-12 UEFA Champions League qualifying match against Bangor City.

In 2011 season he also scored 20 goals in 13 matches in Kakkonen for Klubi-04. After that, he went on loan to FC Haka to make his Veikkausliiga debut. On 5 April 2012, he was loaned back to Haka, on a season-long loan. Kastrati was chosen to the Veikkausliiga team of the Month for May 2013 while playing in FC Honka.

== International career ==
Kastrati scored his Finland national under-21 team debut goal when Finland beat Wales U-21 5–1 in 2015 UEFA European Under-21 Football Championship qualification 14 August 2013.
