= Pauli Kuusijärvi =

Finnish footballer (born 1986)

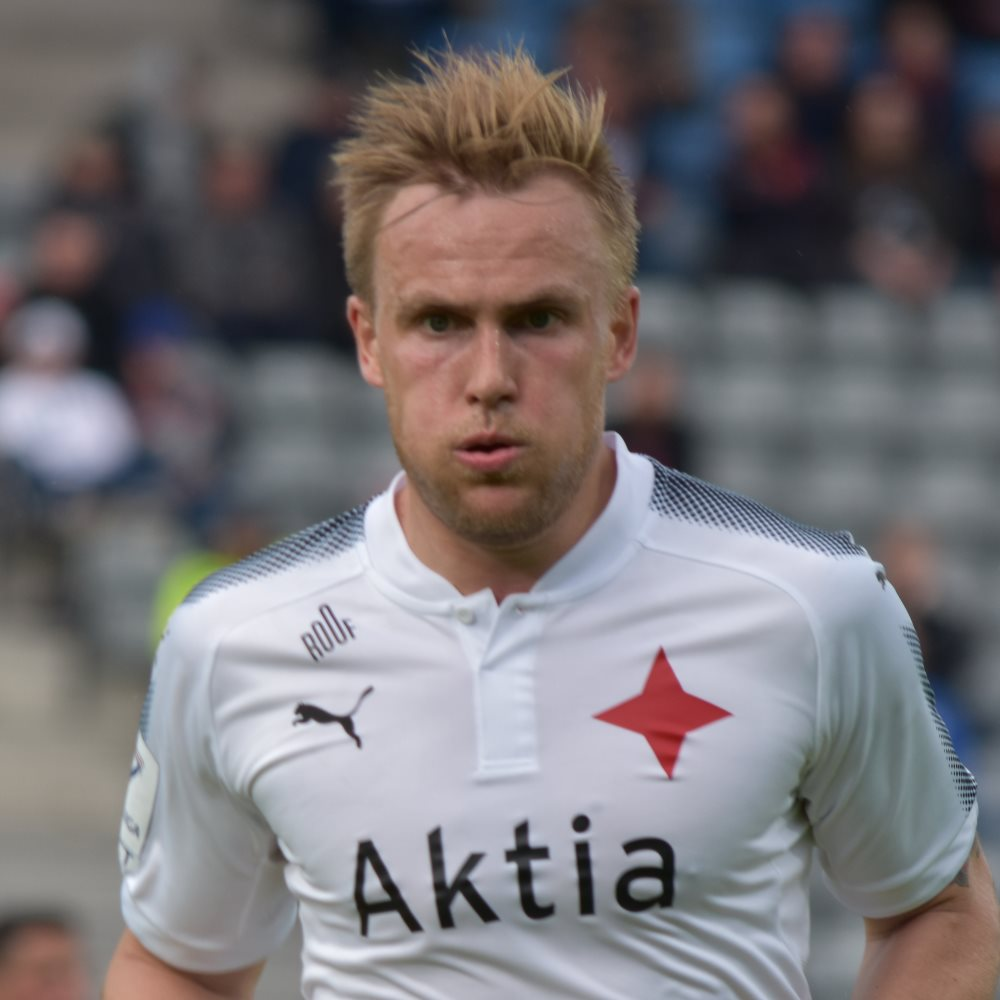

Personal information
- Date of birth: 21 March 1986 (age 40)
- Place of birth: Espoo, Finland
- Height: 1.83 m (6 ft 0 in)
- Position: Centre back

Youth career
- 1997–2001: Honka
- 2002: HIFK
- 2003–2005: Honka

Senior career*
Years	Team	Apps	(Gls)
2006–2010	Espoo	83	(10)
2011	Honka	4	(0)
2011	→ Pallohonka (loan)	2	(0)
2012	Haka	22	(0)
2013	Gnistan	25	(2)
2014–2018	HIFK	101	(6)
2019–2020	Gnistan	44	(5)
2021–2022	PK-35	44	(2)
- * Club domestic league appearances and goals as of 31 December 2022

Pauli Kuusijärvi (born 21 March 1986) is a Finnish former footballer. He primarily played as a defender throughout his career.

== Career ==
Kuusijärvi was born in Espoo, where he played for FC Honka at youth level. From there he moved to another local club, FC Espoo, for which he played 2007-2010 and acted as the captain of the team. Kuusijärvi returned to his former youth club, FC Honka, in February 2011. During his first season on the Finnish top level, Veikkausliiga, he played in four matches. After his year in Honka, he transferred to Valkeakosken Haka. For Haka he played in 22 matches in total. In 2013, he moved to Gnistan.

From 2014 to 2018 he played for HIFK.
