= Sherif Ashraf =

Egyptian footballer (born 1987)

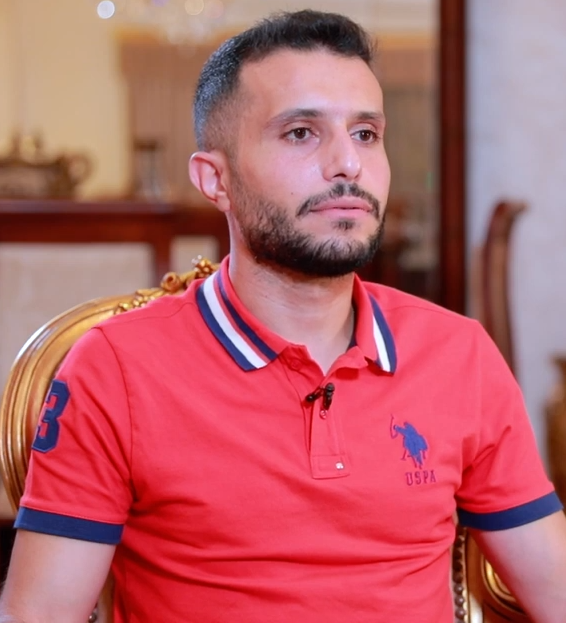

Personal information
- Full name: Sherif Ashraf Hamid Oqila
- Date of birth: January 1, 1987 (age 39)
- Place of birth: Alexandria, Egypt
- Height: 1.76 m (5 ft 9 in)
- Position: Striker

Youth career
- Al-Ahly

Senior career*
Years	Team	Apps	(Gls)
2007–2010	Zamalek	53	(14)
2010–2012	El Gouna	26	(9)
2012–2013	HJK	8	(0)
2012	→ FF Jaro (loan)	7	(3)
2013	Haras El-Hodood	7	(2)
2013–2014	FC Biel-Bienne	9	(2)
2014–2015	El Gouna	12	(7)
2015–2016	El Mokawloon	11	(2)
2016–2017	El-Entag El-Harby		
2017–2018	Jeddah		
2018-	El Qanah		

International career^{‡}
2004–2006	Egypt U17	15	(10)
2006–2008	Egypt U20	30	(16)
2012–	Egypt	3	(0)
- * Club domestic league appearances and goals as of 29 October 2013 ‡ National team caps and goals as of 14 January 2013

Sherif Ashraf Hamid Oqila (Arabic: شَرِيف أَشْرَف حَامِد عَقِيلَة; born on 1 January 1987) is an Egyptian international footballer who plays as a striker. He is known as a prolific goalscorer and is renowned for his mastery of set pieces.

== Club career ==
=== Al-Ahly youth academy ===
He is a graduate of the Al-Ahly youth academy. He was the top scorer in the history of the Egyptian youth league for seven seasons after scoring over 280 goals. He was close to transfer to Belgian giants Standard Liège together with his teammate Mohamed El Shenawy, however El-Ahly management interfered with the transfer. He became known as a machine scorer when he scored 70 goals in the season 2006–2007, and was transferred to his club's arch rivals Zamalek as a free agent after not signing a professional contract with Al-Ahly. Al-Ahly later claimed that Ashraf had signed a contract but the paperwork turned out to be forged. As a result, the Egyptian Football Association placed a 50,000 Egyptian Pounds fine on Al-Ahly.

=== Zamalek SC ===
Ashraf was the top scorer in his team in the season 2008–2009 with 6 goals. In the Egyptian Premier League he wore number 32 but in 2009-2010 he shifted his shirt number to 4.

=== El Gouna FC ===
In 2010, he signed for El Gouna FC for a transfer fee worth 125,000 Euros, despite his expiring contract with Zamalek. He finished his first season as the team's top-scorer followed by Ahmed Hassan Farag.

=== HJK Helsinki ===
In order to regain match fitness because the league was postponed in Egypt, he signed for HJK Helsinki in March 2012, also citing as a reason his desire to attempt a breakthrough in European football. On April 26, 2012, Ashraf made his debut for HJK Helsinki against Jaro in a Quarter final Suomen Cup game. On May 9, 2012, Ashraf scored his debut goal with the club with a header from a corner kick to make the score 1-0 for his club against FC KooTeePee in the semi-final of the Suomen Cup.

=== FF Jaro ===
On September 4, 2012, Ashraf was loaned out to Veikkausliiga side FF Jaro for the remainder of the season. He scored 3 important goals in the final 3 games of the season and assisted 4 times. He scored his debut goal against JJK. His second and third goals for the club were both historic. He scored the fastest goal in the league's history (11 seconds) in a 3–3 draw with Mariehamn, and the third was the winning goal against TPS, the goal which kept Jaro in the Veikkausliiga for another season. Sherif was selected in the Veikkausliiga October team of the month.

=== Haras El-Hodood ===
On February 26, 2013, despite an offer from FF Jaro, he joined Haras El-Hodood until the end of the 2012–2013 season.

=== FC Biel-Bienne ===
On July 18, 2013, Sherif Ashraf made a quick comeback to European football joining Swiss Challenge League side FC Biel-Bienne. He took the league by storm, scoring 4 goals in his first 117 minutes on the pitch.

=== El-Gouna ===
In early 2014, Ashraf made a surprise move back to Egypt, signing a short-term deal at El Gouna FC. He scored his first goal after less than 15 minutes on the field. In summer 2014, he renewed his contract at the club.

=== El-Mokawloon and El-Entag El-Harby ===
Despite strong performances from Ashraf, El-Gouna's relegation meant that he had to leave the club. He chose El Mokawloon SC in August 2015. After managerial changes, he moved on loan to El-Entag El-Harby SC in January 2016, making his debut against El Mokawloon.

== International career ==
=== International Call-Ups ===
Ashraf's performances caught the attention of the Egyptian National Team, who gave him his first senior national call-up in the friendly match against Georgia

Correct as of 14 January 2013

#	Date	Venue	Opponent	Competition
1.	14 November 2012	Tbilisi, Georgia	Georgia	Friendly
2.	28 December 2012	Doha, Qatar	Qatar	Friendly
3.	10 January 2013	Abu Dhabi, UAE	Ghana	Friendly
4.	14 January 2013	Abu Dhabi, UAE	Ivory Coast	Friendly

== Honors ==
=== with Zamalek ===
- Egyptian Cup (2008)

=== with HJK Helsinki ===
- Finnish Premier League (2012)
