= Valtteri Moren =

Finnish footballer (born 1991)

Personal information
- Full name: Valtteri Moren
- Date of birth: 15 June 1991 (age 35)
- Place of birth: Vantaa, Finland
- Height: 1.88 m (6 ft 2 in)
- Position: Centre back

Youth career
- 1996–2004: Kiffen
- 2005–2006: PK-35
- 2007–2008: HJK Helsinki

Senior career*
Years	Team	Apps	(Gls)
2009–2012	Klubi-04	36	(2)
2010–2015	HJK	79	(5)
2015–2020	Waasland-Beveren	76	(1)
2020–2023	HJK	37	(1)

International career^{‡}
2009	Finland U18	12	(0)
2010	Finland U19	2	(0)
2010	Finland U20	1	(0)
2010–2011	Finland U21	5	(0)
2013–2016	Finland	5	(1)
Medal record
Finland national football team
Third place	Baltic Cup	2014
HJK Helsinki
First place	Veikkausliiga	2010
Second place	Finnish Cup	2010
First place	Veikkausliiga	2011
First place	Finnish Cup	2011
Second place	Finnish League Cup	2012
First place	Veikkausliiga	2012
First place	Veikkausliiga	2013
First place	Veikkausliiga	2014
First place	Finnish Cup	2014
First place	Finnish League Cup	2015
Third place	Veikkausliiga	2015
- * Club domestic league appearances and goals as of 31 December 2023 ‡ National team caps and goals as of 30 July 2016

Valtteri Moren (born 15 June 1991) is a Finnish former professional footballer who played as a defender. Moren was born in Vantaa, Finland. He began his senior club career playing for Klubi-04, before making his league debut for HJK at age 19 in 2010. After winning his first trophy, the Veikkausliiga, during his first season on league level, he helped HJK win five successive Veikkausliiga titles, two Cups and a League Cup. After five full seasons in HJK he was sold to Belgian First Division A side Waasland-Beveren.

Moren made his international debut for Finland in October 2013, at the age of 22.

He announced his retirement in November 2024 at the age of 33, due to multiple knee injuries.

== Club career ==
=== HJK Helsinki ===
Moren made his debut for HJK's reserves, Klubi-04, during the 2009 season and finished the season with three appearances. During the next season he was dual-registered with both the A and B-team and made his Veikkausliiga debut against MYPA 13 June 2010.

=== Waasland-Beveren ===
In July 2015 it was announced that Moren had signed a three-year contract with Waasland-Beveren. He made his Belgian First Division A debut on 22 August 2015 in a match against Mouscron when he replaced Miloš Marić as a substitute on 39th minute.

=== Return to HJK ===
In July 2020, Moren returned to HJK on a deal until the end of 2022. After two matches in the Klubi-04 reserve team he debuted in HJK on 18 August 2020 in a match against Haka.

== International career ==
Moren made his debut for the Finland national team on 30 October 2013 in a friendly match in Qualcomm Stadium, San Diego against Mexico when he replaced Jarkko Hurme as a substitute on 62nd minute. He scored his first goal for national team in 2014 Baltic Cup in a 2–0 victory match against Estonia. Moren was called up for four matches in the UEFA Euro 2016 qualifications but he remained as an unused substitute.

== Career statistics ==
=== Club ===
As of 31 December 2023

Appearances and goals by club, season and competition
Club	Season	League			Domestic Cups		Continental		Other		Total	
Club	Season	Division	Apps	Goals	Apps	Goals	Apps	Goals	Apps	Goals	Apps	Goals
Klubi 04	2009	Ykkönen	3	0	0	0	—		—		3	0
Klubi 04	2010	Ykkönen	22	1	0	0	—		—		22	1
Klubi 04	2011	Kakkonen	3	0	0	0	—		—		3	0
Klubi 04	2012	Kakkonen	8	1	0	0	—		—		8	1
Klubi 04	Total		36	2	0	0	0	0	0	0	36	2
HJK Helsinki	2010	Veikkausliiga	2	0	3	0	0	0	—		5	0
HJK Helsinki	2011	Veikkausliiga	6	0	4	2	2 (Note: Appearances in the Champions League)	0	—		12	2
HJK Helsinki	2012	Veikkausliiga	7	1	1	0	1 (Note: Appearances in the Europa League)	0	—		9	1
HJK Helsinki	2013	Veikkausliiga	27	4	6	0	2	0	—		35	4
HJK Helsinki	2014	Veikkausliiga	25	0	6	0	4	1	—		35	1
HJK Helsinki	2015	Veikkausliiga	12	0	4	0	2	0	—		18	0
HJK Helsinki	Total		79	5	21	2	11	1	0	0	111	8
Waasland-Beveren	2015–16	Belgian First Division A	14	0	2	0	—		0	0	16	0
Waasland-Beveren	2016–17	Belgian First Division A	12	0	2	0	—		8 (Note: Appearances in the Belgian Europa League play-offs)	1	22	1
Waasland-Beveren	2017–18	Belgian First Division A	15	0	1	0	—		1	0	17	0
Waasland-Beveren	2018–19	Belgian First Division A	14	0	1	0	—		7	0	22	0
Waasland-Beveren	2019–20	Belgian First Division A	5	0	1	0	—		0	0	6	0
Waasland-Beveren	Total		60	0	7	0	0	0	16	1	83	1
Klubi 04	2020	Kakkonen	2	0	0	0	—		—		2	0
HJK Helsinki	2020	Veikkausliiga	10	0	1	0	—		—		11	0
HJK Helsinki	2021	Veikkausliiga	23	1	3	0	14 (Note: Includes four appearances in the UEFA Champions League, and four appearances in the UEFA Europa League)	0	—		40	1
HJK Helsinki	2022	Veikkausliiga	4	0	2	0	0	0	2	0	8	0
HJK Helsinki	Total		37	1	6	0	14	0	2	0	59	1
Klubi 04	2020	Kakkonen	2	0	—		—		—		2	0
Klubi 04	2023	Kakkonen	1	0	—		—		—		1	0
Klubi 04	Total		3	0	0	0	0	0	0	0	3	0
Career total			217	8	34	2	25	1	18	1	291	12

=== International ===
As of matches played on 29 March 2016

National team	Year	Competitive		Friendly		Total	
National team	Year	Apps	Goals	Apps	Goals	Apps	Goals
Finland	2013	0	0	1	0	1	0
Finland	2014	0	0	1	1	1	1
Finland	2015	0	0	2	0	2	0
Finland	2016	0	0	1	0	1	0
Total		0	0	5	1	5	1

=== International goals ===
Scores and results list Finland's goal tally first.

Goal	Date	Venue	Opponent	Score	Result	Competition
1.	31 May 2014	Ventspils Olimpiskais Stadions, Ventspils, Latvia	Estonia	2–0	2–0	2014 Baltic Cup

== Honours ==
HJK Helsinki

- Finnish championship: 2010, 2011, 2012, 2013, 2014, 2020, 2021, 2022
- Finnish Cup: 2011, 2014, 2020
- Finnish League Cup: 2015

Finland

- 2014 Baltic Cup Bronze
