= Saku-Pekka Sahlgren =

Finnish footballer (born 1992)

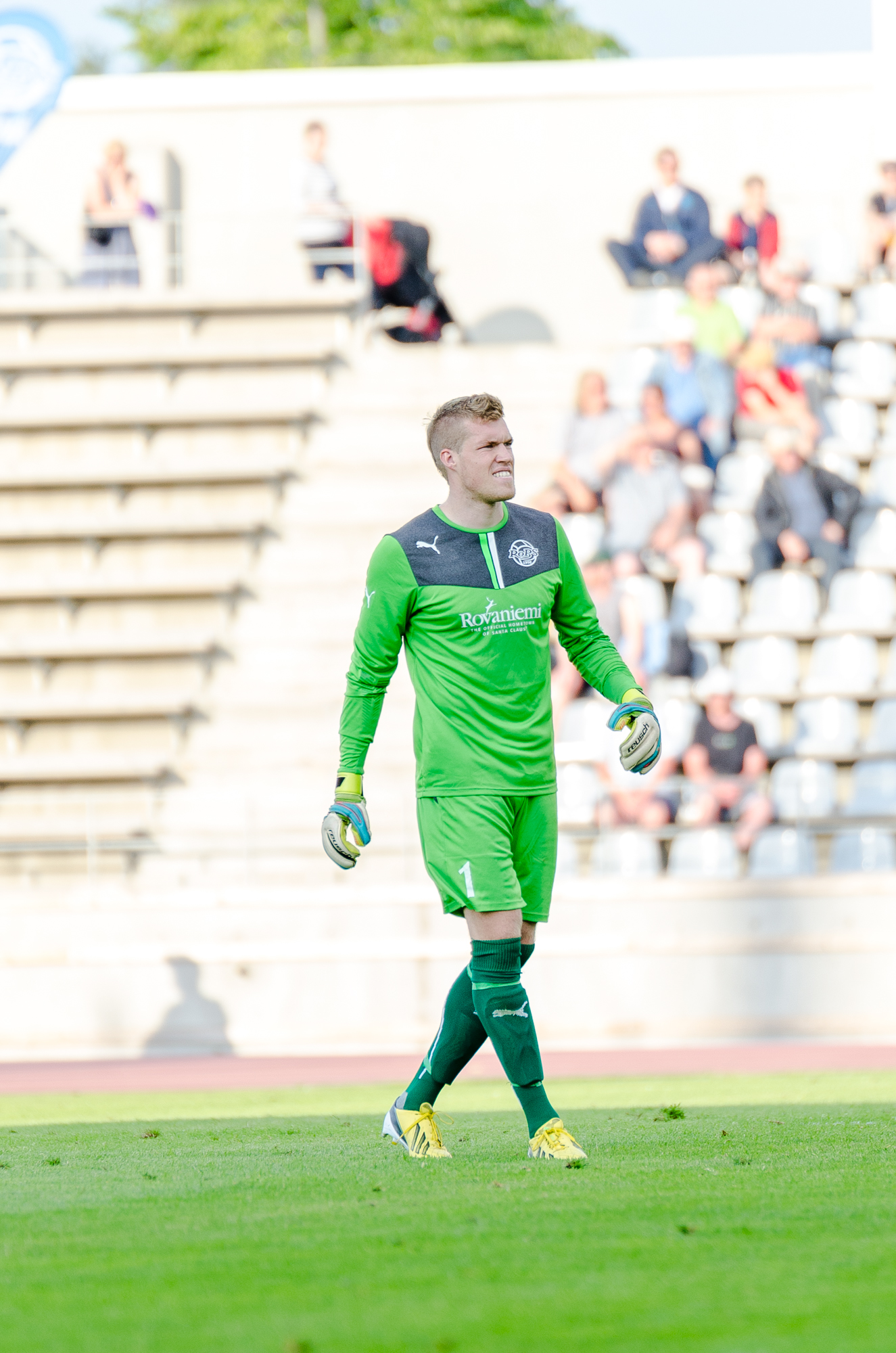
- Saku-Pekka Sahlgren in RoPS – Asteras Tripolis match on 17 July 2014

Personal information
- Full name: Saku-Pekka Sahlgren
- Date of birth: 8 April 1992 (age 34)
- Place of birth: Finland
- Height: 1.87 m (6 ft 1 1/2 in)
- Position: Goalkeeper

Youth career
- KPS

Senior career*
Years	Team	Apps	(Gls)
2009	KPV	3	(0)
2011–2013	HJK	7	(0)
2011–2013	Klubi 04	18	(0)
2014	RoPS	30	(0)
2015	HJK	7	(0)
2015	→ KTP (loan)	4	(0)
2016–2019	Sandnes Ulf	78	(0)
2020–2021	Kongsvinger	3	(0)

International career
	Finland U16	3	(0)
	Finland U17	11	(0)
	Finland U18	5	(0)
	Finland U19	6	(0)
2011	Finland U21	2	(0)
- * Club domestic league appearances and goals

Saku-Pekka Sahlgren (born 8 April 1992) is a Finnish former footballer who played as a goalkeeper.

He signed a two-year contract with Sandnes Ulf in January 2016. He retired after the 2021 season.

== Career statistics ==
As of 1 September 2024.

Appearances and goals by club, season and competition
Club	Season	League			Cup (Note: Includes Suomen Cup)		League cup		Europe		Total	
Club	Season	Division	Apps	Goals	Apps	Goals	Apps	Goals	Apps	Goals	Apps	Goals
KPV	2009	Ykkönen	1	0	–		–		–		1	0
HJK Helsinki	2011	Veikkausliiga	3	0	0	0	–		0	0	3	0
HJK Helsinki	2012	Veikkausliiga	3	0	2	0	0	0	0	0	5	0
HJK Helsinki	2013	Veikkausliiga	1	0	0	0	2	0	0	0	3	0
HJK Helsinki	Total		7	0	2	0	2	0	0	0	11	0
Klubi 04	2011	Kakkonen	11	0	–		–		–		11	0
Klubi 04	2012	Kakkonen	4	0	–		–		–		4	0
Klubi 04	2013	Kakkonen	2	0	–		–		–		2	0
Klubi 04	Total		17	0	0	0	0	0	0	0	17	0
RoPS	2014	Veikkausliiga	30	0	0	0	1	0	2 (Note: Appearances in UEFA Europa League)	0	33	0
HJK Helsinki	2015	Veikkausliiga	7	0	2	0	5	0	0	0	14	0
KTP (loan)	2015	Veikkausliiga	4	0	–		–		–		4	0
Sandnes Ulf	2016	1. divisjon	31	0	4	0	–		–		35	0
Sandnes Ulf	2017	1. divisjon	29	0	2	0	–		–		31	0
Sandnes Ulf	2018	1. divisjon	1	0	–		–		–		1	0
Sandnes Ulf	2019	1. divisjon	18	0	3	0	–		–		21	0
Sandnes Ulf	Total		79	0	9	0	0	0	0	0	88	0
Sandnes Ulf 2	2019	4. divisjon	1	0	–		–		–		1	0
Kongsvinger	2020	1. divisjon	3	0	–		–		–		3	0
Career total			149	0	13	0	8	0	2	0	172	0
