= Aleksi Ristola =

Finnish footballer (born 1989)

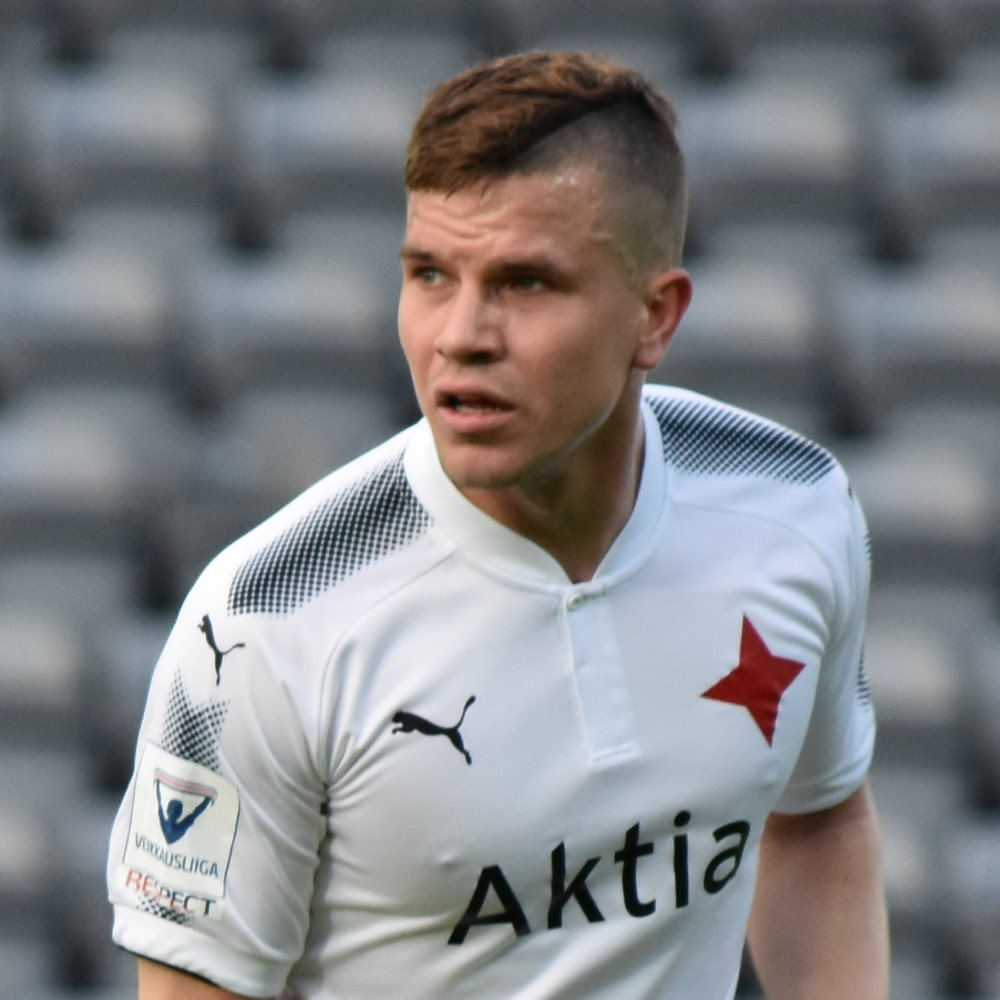
- Ristola with HIFK in 2017

Personal information
- Date of birth: 6 November 1989 (age 37)
- Place of birth: Helsinki, Finland
- Height: 1.84 m (6 ft 0 in)
- Position: Left winger

Team information
- Current team: JäPS
- Number: 9

Youth career
- HPS
- TPS

Senior career*
Years	Team	Apps	(Gls)
2009–2010	Atlantis	40	(15)
2010–2011	PK-35 Vantaa		
2012–2013	TPS	54	(14)
2013	Åbo IFK	1	(0)
2013–2014	Honka	1	(0)
2014–2015	MyPa	28	(6)
2015–2016	Lahti	25	(3)
2016	PK-35 Vantaa	24	(6)
2016–2017	HIFK	34	(4)
2018	TPS	14	(0)
2018	Gnistan	6	(2)
2019–2020	TiPS	19	(28)
2021–	JäPS	98	(40)
- * Club domestic league appearances and goals as of 1 November 2026

Aleksi Ristola (born 6 November 1989) is a Finnish football player who plays for JäPS.
