= Pim Bouwman =

Dutch footballer (born 1991)

Personal information
- Date of birth: 30 January 1991 (age 35)
- Place of birth: Oost-Souburg, Netherlands
- Height: 1.84 m (6 ft 0 in)
- Position: Midfielder

Youth career
- VV RCS
- 2001–2010: NAC

Senior career*
Years	Team	Apps	(Gls)
2010–2012	NAC	2	(0)
2012–2013	Inter Turku	52	(5)
2015–2016	Enosis Neon Paralimni	38	(3)
2016–2018	Ermis Aradippou	40	(2)
2018–2019	Cappellen		
2019–2020	Othellos Athienou	12	(1)
2020–2021	Cappellen	3	(1)
2021–2023	Halsteren		
- * Club domestic league appearances and goals as of 12:25, 3 April 2021 (UTC)

Pim Bouwman (born 30 January 1991) is a Dutch professional footballer who plays a midfielder.

== Club career ==
Born in Oost-Souburg, he made his senior debut for NAC during the 2010–11 season. He moved to Finnish club Inter Turku in January 2012.

He left Enosis Neon Paralimni after the club was relegated and subsequently moved to Ermis Aradippou in July 2016.

Bouwman signed with Cappellen on 17 December 2018. In July 2019, Bouwman returned to Cyprus and joined Othellos Athienou FC. He returned to Cappellen after one season. On 22 March 2021, he agreed on a contract with RKSV Halsteren in the Hoofdklasse, joining them ahead of the 2021–22 season. He left Halsteren by mutual consent in February 2023.
