= Rami Hakanpää =

Finnish footballer (born 1978)

Personal information
- Date of birth: 9 October 1978 (age 48)
- Place of birth: Pori, Finland
- Height: 1.81 m (5 ft 11 in)
- Position: Centre back

Team information
- Current team: PKKU (manager)

Senior career*
Years	Team	Apps	(Gls)
1994–1996	FC Jazz	5	(0)
1996	FC Kontu	8	(0)
1997	PPT Pori	1	(0)
1997–1999	FC Jazz	74	(3)
2000–2006	HJK	99	(10)
2007–2010	FC Honka	80	(7)
2011–2012	HJK	40	(1)
2013	KuPS	5	(0)

International career
2003–2004	Finland	5	(1)

Managerial career
- 2016–: PKKU
- * Club domestic league appearances and goals

Rami "Rambo" Hakanpää (born 9 October 1978) is a Finnish football coach and a former player. He is the manager of PKKU.

== Career ==
Hakanpää started his footballing career at his local club FC Jazz and was signed by HJK in 2000. At HJK he became the fans favorite player, and he made his breakthrough during the 2003 season when HJK won both Finnish Cup and Veikkausliiga. After that Hakanpää had troubles with multiple injuries and spent almost two season in the sidelines. On 2007 he was signed by FC Honka.

In October 2010 Hakanpää was signed back by HJK.
