= Mika Ääritalo =

Finnish footballer (born 1985)

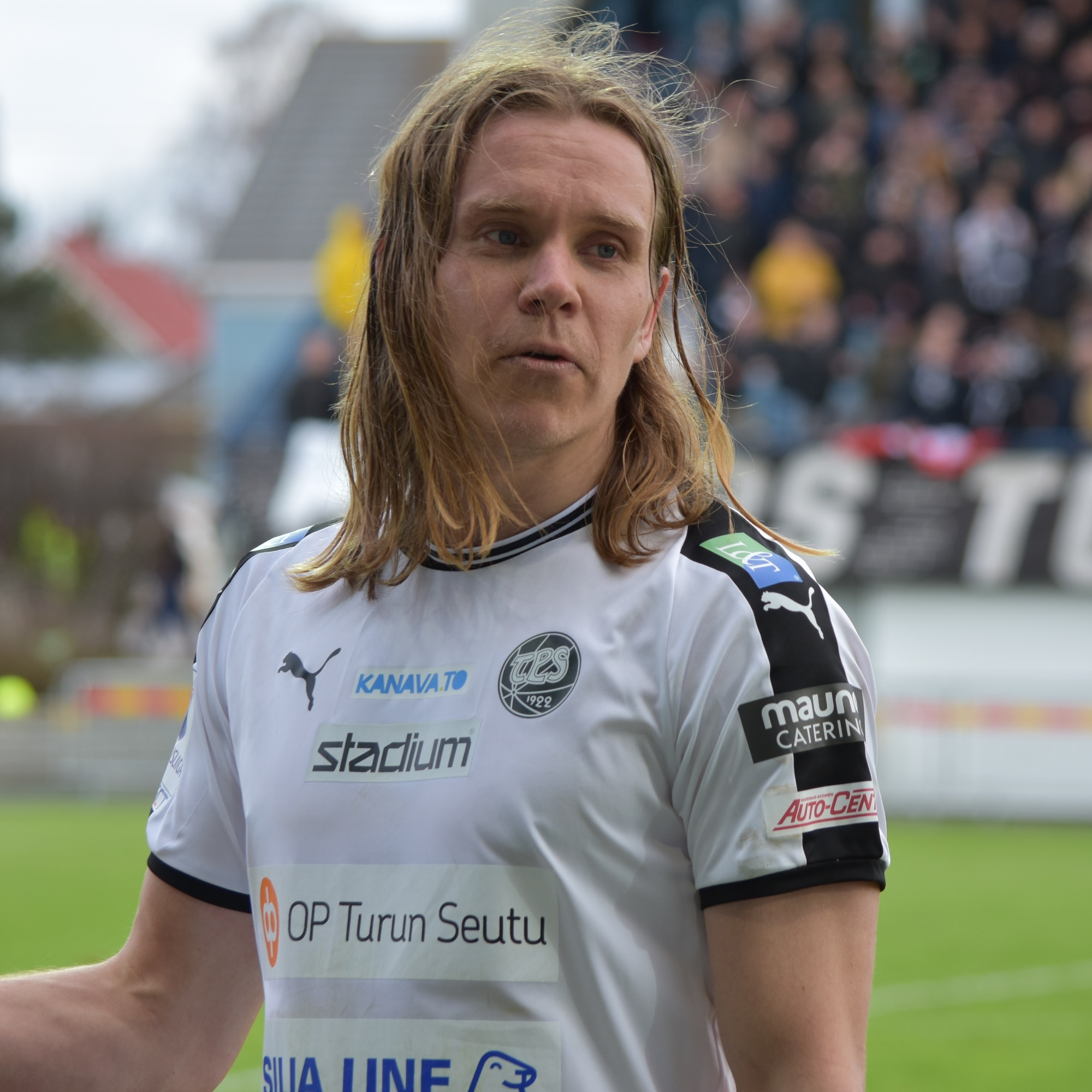
- Ääritalo in Turku 2018

Personal information
- Date of birth: 25 July 1985 (age 41)
- Place of birth: Taivassalo, Finland
- Height: 1.85 m (6 ft 1 in)
- Position: Forward

Senior career*
Years	Team	Apps	(Gls)
2002–2003	TPS	5	(0)
2003–2005	Aston Villa	0	(0)
2005–2015	TPS	196	(47)
2014	→ Holstein Kiel (loan)	6	(0)
2015–2016	Lahti	24	(4)
2016	KuPS	30	(0)
2017–2020	TPS	91	(17)
Total		352	(68)

International career
2010–2012	Finland	6	(1)
- * Club domestic league appearances and goals

Mika Ääritalo (born 25 July 1985) is a Finnish former professional footballer who played as a forward. He made six appearances for the Finland national team scoring once.

== Club career ==
After beginning his senior career in 2002 with hometown club TPS Turku, English Premiership side Aston Villa beat a host of clubs from across Europe to the signing of Ääritalo in January 2003. After failing to make a first-team appearance for Aston Villa, Ääritalo returned to his first club, TPS Turku, in February 2005.

In June 2008, Portuguese BWINLIGA club C.D. Nacional were interested in signing Ääritalo, but the deal fell through due to cost and the fact that Ääritalo did not want to move to Portugal.

In January 2014, he joined the German 3. Liga side Holstein Kiel on a six-month loan. He later played for Turun Palloseura, FC Lahti and Kuopion Palloseura.

== International career ==
Ääritalo made his international debut for the Finland national team in 2010. He scored his first international goal on 22 January 2012, in a friendly against Trinidad and Tobago.

== Career statistics ==
Appearances and goals by national team and year
National team	Year	Apps	Goals
Finland	2010	1	0
Finland	2011	3	0
Finland	2012	2	1
Total		6	1

Score and result list Finland's goal tally first, score column indicates score after Ääritalo's goal.

International goal scored by Mika Ääritalo
No.	Date	Venue	Opponent	Score	Result	Competition
1	22 January 2012	Port of Spain, Trinidad and Tobago	Trinidad and Tobago	3−2	3−2	Friendly
