= Jyrki Saranpää =

Finnish footballer (born 1983)

Personal information
- Date of birth: 30 August 1983 (age 43)
- Place of birth: Seinäjoki, Finland
- Height: 1.78 m (5 ft 10 in)
- Positions: Defender; midfielder; striker

Senior career*
| Years | Team | Apps | (Gls) |
| 2000 | Lapuan Virkiä | 21 | (1) |
| 2001–2004 | TP-Seinäjoki | 61 | (5) |
| 2005–2013 | Vaasan Palloseura | 212 | (8) |
| 2014- | FC Jukola | 29 | (11) |
- * Club domestic league appearances and goals as of 17 October 2009

Jyrki Saranpää (born 30 August 1983) is a Finnish football player who plays for FC Jukola. He is adept at playing as a striker, midfielder and defender. He has even played as a goalkeeper and saved a penalty (against Turun palloseura).
