= Jaakko Nyberg =

Finnish footballer

Personal information
- Full name: Jaakko Kalevi Nyberg
- Date of birth: 19 December 1980 (age 45)
- Place of birth: Kemi, Finland
- Height: 1.86 m (6 ft 1 in)
- Position: Defender

Youth career
- Kemin PS
- –1999: KPT-85

Senior career*
Years	Team	Apps	(Gls)
2000–2001	VPS	54	(0)
2002–2005	Kongsvinger	77	(7)
2006–2008	Bryne	68	(3)
2009–2013	TPS	123	(3)
- * Club domestic league appearances and goals as of 31 December 2013

Jaakko Kalevi Nyberg (born 19 December 1980) is a retired Finnish football defender.

== Career ==
He joined the team Bryne FK from Kongsvinger IL in 2006, and has also played for Kemin PS, KPT-85 and top-flight team VPS Vaasa in his home country. Nyberg left Bryne FK on 20 February 2009 and moved to Turun Palloseura.

== Career statistics ==
As of 15 February 2025

Appearances and goals by club, season and competition
Club	Season	League			Domestic cups (Note: Includes Suomen Cup, Finnish League Cup and Norwegian Cup)		Europe		Total	
Club	Season	Division	Apps	Goals	Apps	Goals	Apps	Goals	Apps	Goals
KePS	1997	Kakkonen								
KePS	1998	Kakkonen								
KePS	Total		37	1	0	0	0	0	37	1
KPT-85	1998	Ykkönen								
KPT-85	1999	Ykkönen								
KPT-85	Total		33	2	0	0	0	0	33	2
VPS	2000	Veikkausliiga	24	2	0	0	–		24	2
VPS	2001	Veikkausliiga	26	2	0	0	–		26	2
VPS	Total		50	4	0	0	0	0	50	4
Kongsvinger	2002	2. divisjon	23	2	1	0	–		24	2
Kongsvinger	2003	2. divisjon	2	0	2	0	–		4	0
Kongsvinger	2004	1. divisjon	29	4	3	1	–		32	5
Kongsvinger	2005	1. divisjon	23	1	0	0	–		23	1
Kongsvinger	Total		77	7	6	1	0	0	83	8
Bryne	2006	1. divisjon	32	1	0	0	–		32	1
Bryne	2007	1. divisjon	23	0	0	0	–		23	0
Bryne	2008	1. divisjon	15	2	0	0	–		15	2
Bryne	Total		70	3	0	0	0	0	70	3
Bryne 2	2008	3. divisjon	1	0	–		–		1	0
TPS	2009	Veikkausliiga	23	2	5	1	–		28	3
TPS	2010	Veikkausliiga	25	1	4	0	4 (Note: Appearances in UEFA Europa League)	0	33	1
TPS	2011	Veikkausliiga	23	0	1	0	2	0	26	0
TPS	2012	Veikkausliiga	30	1	10	0	–		40	1
TPS	2013	Veikkausliiga	22	0	3	0	2	0	27	0
TPS	Total		123	4	23	1	8	0	154	5
Career total			391	21	29	2	8	0	428	23
