= Tuomas Kansikas =

Finnish footballer (born 1981)

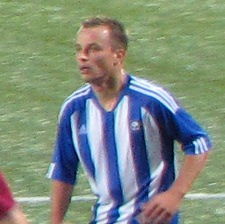

Personal information
- Date of birth: 15 May 1981 (age 45)
- Place of birth: Valkeala, Finland
- Height: 1.74 m (5 ft 9 in)
- Position: Defender

Senior career*
Years	Team	Apps	(Gls)
- Sudet
- FC Kouvola
- FC Kuusankoski
2004–2007	Myllykosken Pallo	71	(1)
2008–2014	HJK Helsinki	98	(0)
- * Club domestic league appearances and goals as of 4 December 2015 ‡ National team caps and goals as of 4 September 2008

Tuomas Kansikas (born 15 May 1981) is a Finnish former footballer. In 2014, he retired from professional football at the age of 32.
