= Cheyne Fowler =

South African-Finnish footballer (born 1982)

Personal information
- Date of birth: 8 March 1982 (age 44)
- Place of birth: Cape Town, South Africa
- Height: 1.91 m (6 ft 3 in)
- Positions: Defender; defensive midfielder

Youth career
- 2003–2008: Hellenic FC
- 2008–2010: FC Haka

Senior career*
Years	Team	Apps	(Gls)
2003–2008	FC Haka	117	(6)
2009–2011	HJK Helsinki	68	(6)
2012–2014	VPS	57	(0)
2015–2016	FC Haka		
2016	→ TPV (loan)		
- TPV
- * Club domestic league appearances and goals

Cheyne Fowler (born 8 March 1982) is a South African former professional soccer player who played as a defender or defensive midfielder. He also holds Finnish nationality.

== Early life ==
Fowler was born in Cape Town in 1982. His maternal grandparents and his mother Taina-Liisa had moved there from Valkeakoski, Finland, when his mother was one year old. Fowler's mother worked as an auditor and his father Anthony Fowler worked in tourism. Fowler started playing football in local Hellenic FC, but moved to Finland in 2002 and joined Haka Valkeakoski's juniors.

== Playing career ==
Fowler made his professional debut in 2003, when he played for Haka in the Veikkausliiga. He spent five seasons playing for Haka, until in 2009 moved to HJK Helsinki in the Finnish capital. In January 2008, he was near to move to Avellino, but Avellino's manager was sacked and the deal collapsed.

In 2010, Fowler started his service in Finnish military as a conscript.

On 27 October 2011 it was announced that Fowler will sign a two-year contract with VPS after his contract with HJK will expire after the 2011 season.

He returned to FC Haka for the start of the 2015 season on a two-year contract. In August 2016, he joined TPV on loan until the end of the 2016 season, and later joined the club on a permanent basis.

== Honours ==
=== Club titles ===
- Finnish championship: 2004, 2009, 2010, 2011
- Finnish Cup: 2005, 2011
