= 2005 Ykkönen =

Finnish League Division 1
- Season: 2005

League tables for teams participating in Ykkönen, the second tier of the Finnish Soccer League system, in 2005.

== League table ==
Pos	Team	Pld	W	D	L	GF	GA	GD	Pts	Promotion or relegation
1	FC Honka (C, P)	26	17	6	3	57	17	+40	57	Promotion to Veikkausliiga
2	VPS (P)	26	17	2	7	49	23	+26	53	Qualification to Promotion playoffs
3	PK-35	26	12	9	5	28	21	+7	45	
4	KPV	26	13	2	11	36	29	+7	41	
5	Rakuunat	26	12	5	9	34	36	−2	41	
6	FC Viikingit	26	11	4	11	43	34	+9	37	
7	Atlantis	26	9	7	10	39	35	+4	34	
8	PP-70	26	9	5	12	32	39	−7	32	
9	MP	26	9	5	12	31	42	−11	32	
10	AC Oulu	26	8	7	11	32	33	−1	31	
11	FC Hämeenlinna (O)	26	8	6	12	26	39	−13	30	Qualification to Relegation playoffs
12	VG-62 (R)	26	8	5	13	29	41	−12	29	Qualification to Relegation playoffs
13	OLS (Note: Jazz Pori withdrew prior to the start of the season and their place was inherited by OLS Oulu, the best non-promoted Kakkonen team in 2004.) (R)	26	8	4	14	23	42	−19	28	Relegation to Kakkonen
14	Pallo-Iirot (R)	26	6	3	17	25	53	−28	21	Relegation to Kakkonen

(C) Champions; (O) Play-off winners; (P) Promoted; (R) Relegated

=== Promotion play-offs ===
RoPS as 13th placed team in the 2005 Veikkausliiga and VPS as runners-up of the 2005 Ykkönen competed in a two-legged play-off for a place in the Veikkausliiga. VPS won the play-offs on away goals (the teams finishing 1–1 on aggregate) and were promoted to the Veikkausliiga.

VPS Vaasa - RoPS Rovaniemi 0-0
RoPS Rovaniemi - VPS Vaasa 1-1

=== Relegation play-offs ===
SalPa Salo - FC Hämeenlinna 0-4
FC Hämeenlinna - SalPa Salo 3-1

Klubi-04 Helsinki - VG-62 Naantali 2-1
VG-62 Naantali - Klubi-04 Helsinki 3-2

Klubi-04 Helsinki were promoted to the Ykkönen and VG-62 Naantali relegated to the Kakkonen. Klubi-04 won on away goals.
FC Hämeenlinna remained in the Ykkönen after beating Salpa 7–1 on aggregate.
