= 2015 SJK season =

SJK
2015 season
- Chairman: Raimo Sarajärvi
- Manager: Simo Valakari
- Stadium: Seinäjoen keskuskenttä
- Veikkausliiga: Champions
- Finnish Cup: Fifth round
- League Cup: Quarterfinal
- UEFA Europa League: First Qualifying Round
- Top goalscorer: League: Akseli Pelvas (14); All: Akseli Pelvas (20)
| Home colours | Away colours |

The 2015 season is Seinäjoen Jalkapallokerho's 8th competitive season, during which they won their first Veikkausliiga title.

== Squad ==
Note: Flags indicate national team as defined under FIFA eligibility rules; some limited exceptions apply. Players may hold more than one non-FIFA nationality.

| No. | Pos. | Nation | Player |
|---|---|---|---|
| 1 | GK | FIN | Jere Koponen |
| 4 | DF | WAL | Richie Dorman |
| 5 | DF | SRB | Pavle Milosavljević (captain) |
| 7 | DF | FIN | Timo Tahvanainen |
| 8 | MF | FIN | Johannes Laaksonen |
| 9 | MF | FIN | Jussi Vasara |
| 10 | MF | ENG | Wayne Brown |
| 11 | FW | CMR | Ariel Ngueukam |
| 14 | FW | FIN | Toni Lehtinen |
| 15 | DF | SRB | Željko Savić |
| 16 | FW | FIN | Akseli Pelvas |
| 17 | MF | FIN | Teemu Penninkangas |
| 18 | FW | FIN | Roope Riski (on loan from Haugesund) |

| No. | Pos. | Nation | Player |
|---|---|---|---|
| 19 | MF | FIN | Emil Lidman |
| 20 | MF | FIN | Marco Matrone |
| 21 | FW | BIH | Bahrudin Atajić |
| 24 | DF | FIN | Henri Aalto |
| 26 | MF | FIN | Jesse Sarajärvi |
| 27 | DF | CIV | Cèdric Gogoua |
| 28 | MF | BRA | Allan (on loan from Liverpool) |
| 33 | GK | EST | Mihkel Aksalu |
| 35 | GK | FIN | Paavo Valakari |
| 53 | DF | FIN | Joona Ala-Hukkala |
| 58 | MF | FIN | Mehmet Hetemaj |
| 63 | MF | FIN | Arttu Aromaa |

=== Out on loan ===
Note: Flags indicate national team as defined under FIFA eligibility rules; some limited exceptions apply. Players may hold more than one non-FIFA nationality.

| No. / Pos. / Nation / Player; 6 / MF / FIN / Juho Lähde (at VPS) | No. / Pos. / Nation / Player; 51 / FW / FIN / Elias Ahde (at FC Jazz) |

== Transfers ==
=== Winter ===
In: Note: Flags indicate national team as defined under FIFA eligibility rules; some limited exceptions apply. Players may hold more than one non-FIFA nationality.

| No. | Pos. | Nation | Player |
|---|---|---|---|
| 1 | GK | FIN | Jere Koponen (from (Finland) Inter Turku) |
| 9 | MF | FIN | Jussi Vasara (from (Finland) Honka) |
| 11 | FW | CMR | Ariel Ngueukam (from (Finland) Lahti) |
| 21 | FW | BIH | Bahrudin Atajić (from (Scotland) Celtic) |
| 24 | DF | FIN | Henri Aalto (from (Finland) Honka) |
| 53 | DF | FIN | Joona Ala-Hukkala |
| 58 | MF | FIN | Mehmet Hetemaj (from (Italy) AlbinoLeffe) |
| 63 | MF | FIN | Arttu Aromaa |

Out: Note: Flags indicate national team as defined under FIFA eligibility rules; some limited exceptions apply. Players may hold more than one non-FIFA nationality.

| No. | Pos. | Nation | Player |
|---|---|---|---|
| 1 | GK | BRA | Luís Fernando |
| 9 | FW | FIN | Juho Mäkelä (to (Finland) VPS) |
| 18 | MF | USA | Justin Moose (to (United States) Wilmington Hammerheads) |
| 19 | MF | EST | Gert Kams (to (Estonia) Flora Tallinn) |
| 21 | DF | FIN | Timo Rauhala (to (Finland) KPV) |
| 22 | DF | FIN | Matti Lähitie (to (Finland) JJK) |
| 23 | MF | FIN | Jyri Hietaharju |
| 24 | FW | FIN | Sami Viljanen |
| 29 | DF | ENG | Arinse Uade |
| 36 | MF | FIN | Aki Sipilä |
| 51 | FW | FIN | Elias Ahde (loan to (Finland) Jazz) |
| 59 | MF | FIN | Joona Lautamaja |
| 70 | MF | FIN | Tuomas Lähdesmäki (to (Finland) Haka) |

=== Summer ===
In: Note: Flags indicate national team as defined under FIFA eligibility rules; some limited exceptions apply. Players may hold more than one non-FIFA nationality.

| No. | Pos. | Nation | Player |
|---|---|---|---|
| 18 | FW | FIN | Roope Riski (loan from (Norway) Haugesund) |
| 28 | MF | BRA | Allan (loan from (England) Liverpool) |

Out: Note: Flags indicate national team as defined under FIFA eligibility rules; some limited exceptions apply. Players may hold more than one non-FIFA nationality.

| No. | Pos. | Nation | Player |
|---|---|---|---|
| 6 | MF | FIN | Juho Lähde (loan to (Finland) VPS) |

== Competitions ==
=== Veikkausliiga ===
The 2015 Veikkausliiga season began on April 12, 2015, and ended on October 25, 2015. Veikkausliiga takes place in the spring to autumn season, due to harsh winter weather conditions in Finland.

==== League table ====
| Pos | Team | Pld | W | D | L | GF | GA | GD | Pts | Qualification or relegation |
|---|---|---|---|---|---|---|---|---|---|---|
| 1 | SJK (C) | 33 | 18 | 6 | 9 | 50 | 22 | +28 | 60 | Qualification for the Champions League second qualifying round |
| 2 | RoPS | 33 | 17 | 8 | 8 | 44 | 29 | +15 | 59 | Qualification for the Europa League first qualifying round |
| 3 | HJK | 33 | 16 | 10 | 7 | 45 | 30 | +15 | 58 | Qualification for the Europa League first qualifying round |
| 4 | Inter Turku | 33 | 13 | 10 | 10 | 45 | 34 | +11 | 49 | |
| 5 | Lahti | 33 | 12 | 12 | 9 | 38 | 36 | +2 | 48 | |

Source: Veikkausliiga, Soccerway
Rules for classification: 1) Points; 2) Goal difference; 3) Goals scored; 4) Head-to-head points; 5) Head-to-head goal difference; 6) Head-to-head goals scored; 7) Fewer away goals allowed; 8) Home goals scored; 9) Fewer home goals allowed; 10) Play-off. (Note: Criteria 7–10 is only used if deciding Champion, teams to UEFA competitions or teams for relegation).
(C) Champions

==== Results summary ====
| Overall | | | | | | | | Home | | | | | | Away | | | | | |
| Pld | W | D | L | GF | GA | GD | Pts | W | D | L | GF | GA | GD | W | D | L | GF | GA | GD |
|---|---|---|---|---|---|---|---|---|---|---|---|---|---|---|---|---|---|---|---|
| 33 | 18 | 6 | 9 | 50 | 22 | +28 | 60 | 13 | 1 | 3 | 34 | 8 | +26 | 5 | 5 | 6 | 16 | 14 | +2 |

Last updated: 25 October 2015.
Source: Soccerway

==== Results by matchday ====
| Matchday | 1 | 2 | 3 | 4 | 5 | 6 | 7 | 8 | 9 | 10 | 11 | 12 | 13 | 14 | 15 | 16 | 17 | 18 | 19 | 20 | 21 | 22 | 23 | 24 | 25 | 26 | 27 | 28 | 29 | 30 | 31 | 32 | 33 |
|---|---|---|---|---|---|---|---|---|---|---|---|---|---|---|---|---|---|---|---|---|---|---|---|---|---|---|---|---|---|---|---|---|---|
| Ground | A | H | A | H | A | H | H | A | H | H | A | H | A | H | A | A | H | H | A | H | A | A | A | H | H | A | H | A | H | A | H | A | H |
| Result | D | W | W | W | L | W | W | D | W | L | W | L | L | W | D | L | W | W | D | L | L | L | W | W | W | D | D | W | W | L | W | W | W |
| Position | 9 | 4 | 2 | 2 | 2 | 1 | 3 | 1 | 2 | 2 | 2 | 3 | 3 | 3 | 3 | 3 | 3 | 3 | 3 | 3 | 3 | 3 | 3 | 3 | 2 | 2 | 3 | 1 | 1 | 2 | 1 | 1 | 1 |

Updated to match(es) played on 25 October 2015. Source: Soccerway
A = Away; H = Home; W = Win; D = Draw; L = Loss

==== Results ====
| 12 April 2015 1 | Inter Turku | 1 – 1 | SJK | Turku |
| 17:00 EEST (UTC+3) | Njoku 15'; Diogo (yellow card) 22' (yellow-red card) 30'; Matoukou (yellow card) 65'; Lehtovaara (yellow card) 90+2' | Report | Gogoua (yellow card) 15'; Atajić (yellow card) 17' (goal) 30'; Brown (yellow card) 30'; Vasara (yellow card) 40'; Pelvas (yellow card) 65' | Stadium: Veritas Stadion; Attendance: 3,892; Referee: Jari Järvinen |

| 19 April 2015 2 | SJK | 1 – 0 | RoPS | Seinäjoki |
| 16:00 EEST (UTC+3) | Ngueukam (yellow card) 23'; Vasara 79' | Report | Pirinen (yellow card) 70' | Stadium: Seinäjoen keskuskenttä Attendance: 2,048; Referee: Mattias Gestranius |

| 23 April 2015 3 | Jaro | 0 – 1 | SJK | Jakobstad |
| 18:30 EEST (UTC+3) | Virtanen (yellow card) 77' | Report | Ngueukam (yellow card) 9'; Gogoua (yellow card) 15'; Pelvas 71'; Laaksonen (yellow card) 90+1' | Stadium: Jakobstads Centralplan; Attendance: 1,248; Referee: Jari Järvinen |

| 3 May 2015 5 | SJK | 2 – 0 | HIFK | Seinäjoki |
| 16:00 EEST (UTC+3) | Ngueukam 74'; Lehtinen 86' | Report | | Stadium: Seinäjoen keskuskenttä Attendance: 2,569; Referee: Dennis Antamo |

| 8 May 2015 6 | Lahti | 1 – 0 | SJK | Lahti |
| 18:30 EEST (UTC+3) | Gela (yellow card) 25'; Ristola 68' | Report | Milosavljević (yellow card) 44'; Savić (yellow card) 62' | Stadium: Lahti Stadium; Attendance: 1,817; Referee: Marko Grönholm |

| 11 May 2015 18 | SJK | 5 – 0 | KuPS | Seinäjoki |
| 18:30 EEST (UTC+3) | Brown 20'; Tahvanainen (yellow card) 36'; Dorman 60'; Laaksonen 75'; Ngueukam 83'; Lähde 90+3' | Report | McCarthy (yellow card) 74' | Stadium: Seinäjoen keskuskenttä Attendance: 1,283; Referee: Petteri Kari |

| 14 May 2015 7 | SJK | 2 – 0 | VPS | Seinäjoki |
| 14:00 EEST (UTC+3) | Hetemaj 18'; Brown 69' | Report | L.Hertsi (yellow card) 33' (yellow-red card) 69'; C.Bantanga (yellow card) 53'; Koskimaa (yellow card) 77'; T.Kula (yellow card) 82' | Stadium: Seinäjoen keskuskenttä Attendance: 2,183; Referee: Antti Munukka |

| 17 May 2015 8 | KTP | 0 – 0 | SJK | Kotka |
| 17:00 EEST (UTC+3) | Heimonen (yellow card) 48'; Aspegren (yellow card) 52' van Gelderen (yellow card) 88' | Report | | Stadium: Arto Tolsa Areena; Attendance: 2,580; Referee: Mikko Mörö |

| 20 May 2015 9 | SJK | 3 – 0 | Ilves | Seinäjoki |
| 18:30 EEST (UTC+3) | Lehtinen 48'; Vasara 62'; Dorman 66'; Gogoua (yellow card) 74'; Ngueukam (yellow card) 90' | Report | | Stadium: Seinäjoen keskuskenttä Attendance: 1,487; Referee: Ville Nevalainen |

| 24 May 2015 10 | SJK | 1 – 2 | HJK | Seinäjoki |
| 18:30 EEST (UTC+3) | Aalto (yellow card) 15'; Vasara (yellow card) 22'; Pelvas 31' | Report | Lampi (yellow card) 39'; Savage 50'; Tanaka 76' | Stadium: Seinäjoen keskuskenttä Attendance: 4,027; Referee: Mattias Gestranius |

| 3 June 2015 11 | IFK Mariehamn | 0 – 3 | SJK | Mariehamn |
| 18:30 EEST (UTC+3) | Mantilla (yellow card) 83' | Report | Ngueukam 39'; Hetemaj (yellow card) 58'; Tahvanainen (yellow card) 75'; Pelvas 83' (pen.), 87' | Stadium: Wiklöf Holding Arena; Attendance: 1,453; Referee: Mikko Mörö |

| 7 June 2015 12 | SJK | 0 – 1 | RoPS | Seinäjoki |
| 14:00 EEST (UTC+3) | Milosavljević (yellow card) 36'; Gogoua (yellow card) 68'; Pelvas (yellow card) 74' | Report | Mäkitalo 8'; Yaghoubi (yellow card) 22'; Obilor (yellow card) 90+3' | Stadium: Seinäjoen keskuskenttä Attendance: 1,956; Referee: Ville Nevalainen |

| 17 June 2015 13 | HJK | 3 – 1 | SJK | Helsinki |
| 18:30 EEST (UTC+3) | Zeneli 17'; Baah (yellow card) 60'; Tanaka (yellow card) 64' (goal) 90+1'; Havenaar 72' | Report | Brown (yellow card) 16'; Lähde (yellow card) 64'; Lehtinen 90+3' | Stadium: Sonera Stadium; Attendance: 4,121; Referee: Petri Viljanen |

| 22 June 2015 14 | SJK | 3 – 2 | VPS | Seinäjoki |
| 18:30 EEST (UTC+3) | Gogoua 9'; Hetemaj (yellow card) 26'; Lehtinen 49' (pen.); Pelvas 58' | Report | Mäkelä 24' (pen.), 64' | Stadium: Seinäjoen keskuskenttä Attendance: 2,078; Referee: Dennis Antamo |

| 25 June 2015 15 | IFK Mariehamn | 1 – 1 | SJK | Mariehamn |
| 18:30 EEST (UTC+3) | Tammilehto 1'; Span (yellow card) 62'; R.Sid (yellow card) 77' | Report | Lehtinen 71' (pen.); Brown (yellow card) 90+2' | Stadium: Wiklöf Holding Arena; Attendance: 1,302; Referee: Petteri Kari |

| 6 July 2015 17 | Lahti | 1 – 0 | SJK | Lahti |
| 18:30 EEST (UTC+3) | Gela (yellow card) 25'; M'Boma 77' | Report | Aalto (yellow card) 29'; Atajić (yellow card) 50'; Milosavljević (yellow card) 70'; Ngueukam (yellow card) 85' | Stadium: Lahti Stadium; Attendance: 1,923; Referee: Jani Laaksonen |

| 12 July 2015 18 | SJK | 1 – 0 | KTP | Seinäjoki |
| 18:30 EEST (UTC+3) | Lidman 88' | Report | McFaul (red card) 34'; H.Järviniemi (yellow card) 81' | Stadium: Seinäjoen keskuskenttä Attendance: 2,215; Referee: Dennis Antamo |

| 19 July 2015 19 | SJK | 4 – 1 | HIFK | Seinäjoki |
| 18:30 EEST (UTC+3) | Pelvas 5', 29', 54', 60' | Report | Halme 72' (yellow card) 73'; Anyamele (yellow card) 90+2' | Stadium: Seinäjoen keskuskenttä Attendance: 3,087; Referee: Petri Viljanen |

| 26 July 2015 20 | Ilves | 0 – 0 | SJK | Tampere |
| 18:30 EEST (UTC+3) | Ala-Myllymäki (yellow card) 22'; Aho (yellow card) 49'; Mäkijärvi (yellow card) 84'; Kujala (yellow card) 85' | Report | Ngueukam (yellow card) 87'; Vasara (yellow card) 89' | Stadium: Tammela Stadion; Attendance: 3,630; Referee: Mattias Gestranius |

| 2 August 2015 21 | SJK | 0 – 1 | Inter Turku | Seinäjoki |
| 15:00 EEST (UTC+3) | Milosavljević (yellow card) 85' | Report | Aho 29' (pen.) (yellow card) 74'; P.Njoku (yellow card) 38'; J.Hämäläinen (yellow card) 58'; Lehtonen (yellow card) 69' | Stadium: Seinäjoen keskuskenttä Attendance: 2,568; Referee: Ville Nevalainen |

| 9 August 2015 22 | Jaro | 1 – 0 | SJK | Jakobstad |
| 16:00 EEST (UTC+3) | Sara (yellow card) 12'; Moore 87' | Report | Hetemaj (yellow card) 15'; Gogoua (yellow card) 71' | Stadium: Jakobstads Centralplan; Attendance: 2,028; Referee: Tero Nieminen |

| 12 August 2015 23 | RoPS | 2 – 0 | SJK | Rovaniemi |
| 18:30 EEST (UTC+3) | Obilor (yellow card) 25'; Okkonen (yellow card) 81'; S.Roiha 87', 90'; Mäkitalo (yellow card) 90+1' | Report | Gogoua (yellow card) 45+2'; Dorman (yellow card) 90' | Stadium: Rovaniemen keskuskenttä Attendance: 2,683; Referee: Mikko Mörö |

| 23 August 2015 25 | VPS | 1 – 3 | SJK | Vaasa |
| 18:30 EEST (UTC+3) | Mäkelä 50'; Koskimaa (yellow card) 61'; J.Voutilainen (yellow card) 74' | Report | Ngueukam 23' (yellow card) 65'; Gogoua (yellow card) 23' (yellow-red card) 83'; Riski 68', 81' | Stadium: Hietalahti Stadium; Attendance: 2,616; Referee: Mikka Lähdesmäki |

| 26 August 2015 3 | SJK | 1 – 0 | KuPS | Seinäjoki |
| 18:30 EEST (UTC+3) | Riski 40' (yellow card) 70'; Laaksonen (yellow card) 76' | Report | | Stadium: Seinäjoen keskuskenttä Attendance: 1,465; Referee: Dennis Antamo |

| 30 August 2015 26 | SJK | 4 – 0 | IFK Mariehamn | Seinäjoki |
| 18:30 EEST (UTC+3) | Gogoua 24'; Pelvas 57', 77'; Laaksonen 70' | Report | | Stadium: Seinäjoen keskuskenttä Attendance: 2,289; Referee: Antti Munukka |

| 10 September 2015 27 | KuPS | 1 – 1 | SJK | Kuopio |
| 18:30 EEST (UTC+3) | U.Nissilä 88' | Report | Tahvanainen (yellow card) 38'; Allan 72'; Aksalu (yellow card) 88' | Stadium: Kuopio Football Stadium; Attendance: 1,811; Referee: Mattias Gestranius |

| 13 September 2015 28 | SJK | 0 – 0 | Lahti | Seinäjoki |
| 17:30 EEST (UTC+3) | Allan (yellow card) 40' | Report | Kärkkäinen (yellow card) 62' | Stadium: Seinäjoen keskuskenttä Attendance: 3,024; Referee: Anntamo Dennis |

| 20 September 2015 29 | KTP | 1 – 3 | SJK | Kotka |
| 16:00 EEST (UTC+3) | McFaul (yellow card) 27'; Ikävalko 38'; Aspegren (yellow card) 68'; Oksanen (yellow card) 90' | Report | Riski 53', 90+1' (pen.); Lehtinen 83' | Stadium: Arto Tolsa Areena; Attendance: 1,320; Referee: Jari Järvinen |

| 23 September 2015 28 | SJK | 3 – 0 | HJK | Seinäjoki |
| 17:00 EEST (UTC+3) | Tahvanainen 17'; Riski 55'; Ngueukam 64' | Report | Baah (yellow card) 24' | Stadium: Seinäjoen keskuskenttä Attendance: 4,311; Referee: Marko Grönholm |

| 28 September 2015 30 | HIFK | 1 – 0 | SJK | Helsinki |
| 18:30 EEST (UTC+3) | Korhonen 38' | Report | Tahvanainen (yellow card) 13'; Gogoua (yellow card) 60' | Stadium: Sonera Stadium; Attendance: 2,644; Referee: Mikko Mörö |

| 4 October 2015 31 | SJK | 2 – 1 | Ilves | Seinäjoki |
| 15:00 EEST (UTC+3) | Pelvas 12', 24' (pen.); Lehtinen (yellow card) 52'; Allan (yellow card) 76' | Report | Lahtinen (yellow card) 29'; Chidozie 53' | Stadium: Seinäjoen keskuskenttä Attendance: 3,106; Referee: Mikka Lähdesmäki |

| 18 October 2015 32 | Inter Turku | 0 – 2 | SJK | Turku |
| 14:00 EEST (UTC+3) | | Report | Pelvas 36'; Riski 45' | Stadium: Veritas Stadion; Attendance: 3,329; Referee: Tero Nieminen |

| 25 October 2015 33 | SJK | 2 – 0 | Jaro | Seinäjoki |
| 13:00 EEST (UTC+3) | Hetemaj 2' (yellow card) 22'; Riski 90' (yellow card) 90+1' | Report | Sara (yellow card) 40'; Vaganov (yellow card) 45+2'; Eremenko (yellow card) 80'; Denis (yellow card) 87' | Stadium: Seinäjoen keskuskenttä Attendance: 6,011; Referee: Mattias Gestranius |

=== Finnish Cup ===
| 4 April 2015 Fifth Round | SJK | 1 – 2 | KuPS | Seinäjoki |
| 15:00 EEST (UTC+3) | Aksalu (yellow card) 16'; Brown 45' | Report | Pennanen 17' (pen.); Poutiainen (yellow card) 21'; Hatakka (yellow card) 43'; Hakola 64' | Stadium: Seinäjoen keskuskenttä Attendance: 499; Referee: Jani Laaksonen |

=== League Cup ===
| Pos | Team | Pld | W | D | L | GF | GA | GD | Pts | Qualification |
|---|---|---|---|---|---|---|---|---|---|---|
| 1 | SJK | 2 | 2 | 0 | 0 | 5 | 0 | +5 | 6 | Knockout stage |
| 2 | VPS | 2 | 1 | 0 | 1 | 1 | 1 | 0 | 3 | Knockout stage |
| 3 | Jaro | 2 | 0 | 0 | 2 | 0 | 5 | −5 | 0 | |

Updated to match(es) played on 14 February 2015. Source: veikkausliiga.com
Rules for classification: 1) points; 2) goal difference; 3) number of goals scored; 4) head-to-head points; 5) head-to-head goal difference; 6) goals scored in head-to-head

| 11 February 2015 Group C | SJK | 1 – 0 | VPS | Seinäjoki |
| 18:30 EET (UTC+2) | Hetemaj (yellow card) 12'; Ngueukam 54' | Report | | Stadium: Wallsport Areena; Attendance: 450; Referee: Tommi Grönman |

| 14 February 2015 Group C | SJK | 4 – 0 | Jaro | Seinäjoki |
| 14:15 EET (UTC+2) | Pelvas 41'; Atajić (yellow card) 45' (goal) 82'; Ngueukam 48'; Brown (yellow card) 72'; Matrone 86' | Report | Opiyo (red card) 72' | Stadium: Wallsport Areena; Attendance: 459; Referee: Jani Laaksonen |

| 18 February 2015 Group C | VPS | 0 – 3 | SJK | Vaasa |
| 18:30 EET (UTC+2) | | Report | Vasara 28'; Pelvas 36', 56'; Gogoua (yellow card) 38'; Atajić (yellow card) 87' | Stadium: Hietalahti Stadium; Referee: Petri Viljanen |

| 28 February 2015 Group C | Jaro | 3 – 4 | SJK | Jakobstad |
| 15:15 EET (UTC+2) | S.Eremenko 16', 40'; J.Veteli 29'; A.Vidjeskog (yellow card) 60'; Reginaldo (yellow card) 66' | Report | Atajić 8', 34'; Penninkangas (yellow card) 31'; Dorman (yellow card) 38'; Matrone (yellow card) 50'; Pelvas 51', 84' | Stadium: Jakobstads Centralplan; Attendance: 450; Referee: Mattias Gestranius |

| 7 March 2015 Quarterfinal | SJK | 2 – 2 (3 – 4 p) | RoPS | Seinäjoki |
| 16:00 EET (UTC+2) | Gogoua (yellow card) 8'; Laaksonen (yellow card) 21'; Pelvas 45+3'; Dorman (yellow card) 51'; Vasara 85'; Penninkangas (yellow card) 90' | Report | Okkonen 9'; T.Hradecky (yellow card) 27'; Lahdenmäki (yellow card) 41'; J.Saksela 46' (yellow card) 54'; Chencinski (yellow card) 60'; Yaghoubi (yellow card) 72' | Stadium: Wallsport Areena; Attendance: 497; Referee: Ville Nevalainen |

=== UEFA Europa League ===
==== Qualifying rounds ====
| 2 July 2015 First qualifying round 1st leg | SJK (Finland) | 0 – 1 | (Iceland) FH | Helsinki (Note: SJK played their home match at Sonera Stadium, Helsinki, instead of their regular stadium Seinäjoen keskuskenttä, Seinäjoki.), Finland |
| 20:00 EEST (UTC+3) | Laaksonen (yellow card) 29'; Hetemaj (yellow card) 57'; Gogoua (yellow card) 62' | Report | Viðarsson (yellow card) 24'; Lennon 56' | Stadium: Sonera Stadium; Attendance: 2,678; Referee: Tihomir Pejin (Croatia) |

| 9 July 2015 First qualifying round 2nd leg | FH (Iceland) | 1 – 0 (2 – 0 agg.) | (Finland) SJK | Hafnarfjörður, Iceland |
| 23:15 EEST (UTC+3) | Viðarsson (yellow card) 13'; Viðarsson (yellow card) 49'; K.F.Finnbogason 90+1' | Report | Aalto (yellow card) 62'; Gogoua (yellow card) 73'; Milosavljević (yellow card) 76' | Stadium: Kaplakrikavöllur; Attendance: 1,473; Referee: Mervyn Smyth (Northern Ireland) |

== Squad statistics ==
As of match played 25 October 2015

=== Appearances and goals ===
| No. | Pos | Nat | Player | Total | | Veikkausliiga | | Finnish Cup | | League Cup | | Europa League | |
| No. | Pos | Nat | Player | Apps | Goals | Apps | Goals | Apps | Goals | Apps | Goals | Apps | Goals |
|---|---|---|---|---|---|---|---|---|---|---|---|---|---|
| 1 | GK | (Finland) FIN | Jere Koponen | 3 | 0 | 1 | 0 | 0 | 0 | 2 | 0 | 0 | 0 |
| 4 | DF | (Wales) WAL | Richie Dorman | 30 | 2 | 20+3 | 2 | 1 | 0 | 5 | 0 | 1 | 0 |
| 5 | DF | (Serbia) SRB | Pavle Milosavljević | 26 | 0 | 18+1 | 0 | 0 | 0 | 5 | 0 | 2 | 0 |
| 7 | DF | (Finland) FIN | Timo Tahvanainen | 31 | 1 | 26 | 1 | 0+1 | 0 | 2 | 0 | 1+1 | 0 |
| 8 | MF | (Finland) FIN | Johannes Laaksonen | 36 | 2 | 19+12 | 2 | 1 | 0 | 3 | 0 | 1 | 0 |
| 9 | MF | (Finland) FIN | Jussi Vasara | 36 | 4 | 22+7 | 2 | 1 | 0 | 3+1 | 2 | 1+1 | 0 |
| 10 | MF | (England) ENG | Wayne Brown | 31 | 3 | 19+6 | 2 | 1 | 1 | 2+1 | 0 | 2 | 0 |
| 11 | FW | (Cameroon) CMR | Ariel Ngueukam | 38 | 7 | 23+9 | 5 | 1 | 0 | 4 | 2 | 0+1 | 0 |
| 14 | FW | (Finland) FIN | Toni Lehtinen | 29 | 6 | 13+10 | 6 | 0+1 | 0 | 3 | 0 | 2 | 0 |
| 15 | DF | (Serbia) SRB | Željko Savić | 32 | 0 | 30 | 0 | 1 | 0 | 0 | 0 | 1 | 0 |
| 16 | FW | (Finland) FIN | Akseli Pelvas | 40 | 20 | 28+4 | 14 | 1 | 0 | 4+1 | 6 | 2 | 0 |
| 17 | MF | (Finland) FIN | Teemu Penninkangas | 10 | 0 | 0+6 | 0 | 0 | 0 | 3+1 | 0 | 0 | 0 |
| 18 | FW | (Finland) FIN | Roope Riski | 13 | 8 | 13 | 8 | 0 | 0 | 0 | 0 | 0 | 0 |
| 19 | MF | (Finland) FIN | Emil Lidman | 6 | 1 | 0+4 | 1 | 0+1 | 0 | 0 | 0 | 0+1 | 0 |
| 20 | MF | (Finland) FIN | Marco Matrone | 4 | 1 | 0+1 | 0 | 0 | 0 | 2+1 | 1 | 0 | 0 |
| 21 | FW | (Bosnia and Herzegovina) BIH | Bahrudin Atajić | 26 | 3 | 13+6 | 1 | 0 | 0 | 3+2 | 2 | 0+2 | 0 |
| 24 | DF | (Finland) FIN | Henri Aalto | 23 | 0 | 19+2 | 0 | 1 | 0 | 0 | 0 | 1 | 0 |
| 26 | MF | (Finland) FIN | Jesse Sarajärvi | 6 | 0 | 0+1 | 0 | 0 | 0 | 2+3 | 0 | 0 | 0 |
| 27 | DF | (Ivory Coast) CIV | Cèdric Gogoua | 34 | 2 | 27+1 | 2 | 1 | 0 | 3 | 0 | 2 | 0 |
| 28 | MF | (Brazil) BRA | Allan | 8 | 1 | 7+1 | 1 | 0 | 0 | 0 | 0 | 0 | 0 |
| 33 | GK | (Estonia) EST | Mihkel Aksalu | 38 | 0 | 32 | 0 | 1 | 0 | 3 | 0 | 2 | 0 |
| 53 | DF | (Finland) FIN | Joona Ala-Hukkala | 3 | 0 | 0 | 0 | 0 | 0 | 1+2 | 0 | 0 | 0 |
| 58 | MF | (Finland) FIN | Mehmet Hetemaj | 37 | 2 | 30+1 | 2 | 1 | 0 | 3 | 0 | 2 | 0 |
Players away from SJK on loan:
| 6 | MF | (Finland) FIN | Juho Lähde | 11 | 1 | 3+5 | 1 | 0 | 0 | 1+2 | 0 | 0 | 0 |
Players who left SJK during the season:

=== Goal scorers ===
| Place | Position | Nation | Number | Name | Veikkausliiga | Finnish Cup | League Cup | Europa League | Total |
|---|---|---|---|---|---|---|---|---|---|
| 1 | FW | (Finland) | 16 | Akseli Pelvas | 14 | 0 | 6 | 0 | 20 |
| 2 | FW | (Finland) | 18 | Roope Riski | 8 | 0 | 0 | 0 | 8 |
| 3 | FW | (Cameroon) | 11 | Ariel Ngueukam | 5 | 0 | 2 | 0 | 7 |
| 4 | FW | (Finland) | 14 | Toni Lehtinen | 6 | 0 | 0 | 0 | 6 |
| 5 | MF | (Finland) | 9 | Jussi Vasara | 2 | 0 | 2 | 0 | 4 |
| 6 | MF | (England) | 10 | Wayne Brown | 2 | 1 | 0 | 0 | 3 |
| 6 | FW | (Bosnia and Herzegovina) | 21 | Bahrudin Atajić | 1 | 0 | 2 | 0 | 3 |
| 8 | DF | (Wales) | 4 | Richie Dorman | 2 | 0 | 0 | 0 | 2 |
| 8 | MF | (Finland) | 8 | Johannes Laaksonen | 2 | 0 | 0 | 0 | 2 |
| 8 | DF | (Ivory Coast) | 27 | Cèdric Gogoua | 2 | 0 | 0 | 0 | 2 |
| 8 | MF | (Finland) | 58 | Mehmet Hetemaj | 2 | 0 | 0 | 0 | 2 |
| 12 | MF | (Finland) | 6 | Juho Lähde | 1 | 0 | 0 | 0 | 1 |
| 12 | MF | (Finland) | 19 | Emil Lidman | 1 | 0 | 0 | 0 | 1 |
| 12 | MF | (Brazil) | 28 | Allan | 1 | 0 | 0 | 0 | 1 |
| 12 | DF | (Finland) | 7 | Timo Tahvanainen | 1 | 0 | 0 | 0 | 1 |
| 12 | MF | (Finland) | 20 | Marco Matrone | 0 | 0 | 1 | 0 | 1 |
| TOTALS | | | | | 50 | 1 | 13 | 0 | 64 |

=== Clean sheets ===
| Place | Position | Nation | Number | Name | Veikkausliiga | Finnish Cup | League Cup | Europa League | Total |
|---|---|---|---|---|---|---|---|---|---|
| 1 | GK | (Estonia) | 33 | Mihkel Aksalu | 16 | 0 | 2 | 0 | 18 |
| 2 | GK | (Finland) | 1 | Jere Koponen | 0 | 0 | 1 | 0 | 1 |
| TOTALS | | | | | 16 | 0 | 3 | 0 | 19 |

=== Disciplinary record ===
| Number | Nation | Position | Name | Veikkausliiga | | Finnish Cup | | League Cup | | Europa League | | Total | |
| Number | Nation | Position | Name | Yellow card | Red card | Yellow card | Red card | Yellow card | Red card | Yellow card | Red card | Yellow card | Red card |
| 4 | (Wales) | DF | Richie Dorman | 1 | 0 | 0 | 0 | 2 | 0 | 0 | 0 | 3 | 0 |
| 5 | (Serbia) | DF | Pavle Milosavljević | 4 | 0 | 0 | 0 | 0 | 0 | 1 | 0 | 5 | 0 |
| 7 | (Finland) | DF | Timo Tahvanainen | 4 | 0 | 0 | 0 | 0 | 0 | 0 | 0 | 4 | 0 |
| 8 | (Finland) | MF | Johannes Laaksonen | 2 | 0 | 0 | 0 | 1 | 0 | 1 | 0 | 4 | 0 |
| 9 | (Finland) | MF | Jussi Vasara | 3 | 0 | 0 | 0 | 0 | 0 | 0 | 0 | 3 | 0 |
| 10 | (England) | MF | Wayne Brown | 3 | 0 | 0 | 0 | 1 | 0 | 0 | 0 | 4 | 0 |
| 11 | (Cameroon) | FW | Ariel Ngueukam | 6 | 0 | 0 | 0 | 0 | 0 | 0 | 0 | 6 | 0 |
| 14 | (Finland) | FW | Toni Lehtinen | 1 | 0 | 0 | 0 | 0 | 0 | 0 | 0 | 1 | 0 |
| 15 | (Serbia) | DF | Željko Savić | 1 | 0 | 0 | 0 | 0 | 0 | 0 | 0 | 1 | 0 |
| 16 | (Finland) | FW | Akseli Pelvas | 2 | 0 | 0 | 0 | 0 | 0 | 0 | 0 | 2 | 0 |
| 17 | (Finland) | MF | Teemu Penninkangas | 0 | 0 | 0 | 0 | 2 | 0 | 0 | 0 | 2 | 0 |
| 18 | (Finland) | FW | Roope Riski | 2 | 0 | 0 | 0 | 0 | 0 | 0 | 0 | 2 | 0 |
| 20 | (Finland) | MF | Marco Matrone | 0 | 0 | 0 | 0 | 1 | 0 | 0 | 0 | 1 | 0 |
| 21 | (Bosnia and Herzegovina) | FW | Bahrudin Atajić | 2 | 0 | 0 | 0 | 2 | 0 | 0 | 0 | 4 | 0 |
| 24 | (Finland) | DF | Henri Aalto | 2 | 0 | 0 | 0 | 0 | 0 | 1 | 0 | 3 | 0 |
| 27 | (Ivory Coast) | DF | Cèdric Gogoua | 9 | 1 | 0 | 0 | 2 | 0 | 2 | 0 | 13 | 1 |
| 28 | (Brazil) | MF | Allan | 2 | 0 | 0 | 0 | 0 | 0 | 0 | 0 | 2 | 0 |
| 33 | (Estonia) | GK | Mihkel Aksalu | 1 | 0 | 1 | 0 | 0 | 0 | 0 | 0 | 2 | 0 |
| 58 | (Finland) | MF | Mehmet Hetemaj | 4 | 0 | 0 | 0 | 1 | 0 | 1 | 0 | 6 | 0 |
Players who left SJK during the season:
| 6 | (Finland) | MF | Juho Lähde | 1 | 0 | 0 | 0 | 0 | 0 | 0 | 0 | 1 | 0 |
| TOTALS | | | | 50 | 1 | 1 | 0 | 0 | 0 | 6 | 0 | 57 | 1 |
