= Allan (footballer, born 1997) =

Brazilian footballer

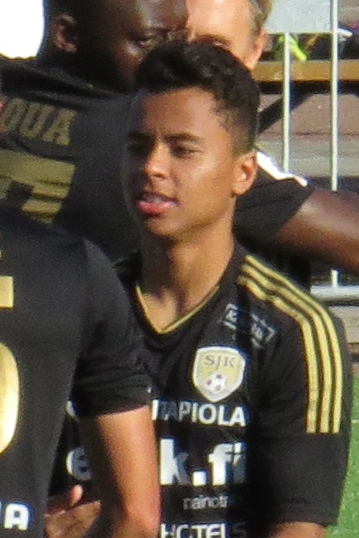
- Allan with SJK in 2015

Personal information
- Full name: Allan Rodrigues de Souza
- Date of birth: 3 March 1997 (age 29)
- Place of birth: Araçatuba, São Paulo, Brazil
- Height: 1.72 m (5 ft 8 in)
- Position: Midfielder

Team information
- Current team: Corinthians (on loan from Flamengo)
- Number: 29

Youth career
- 2012–2015: Internacional

Senior career*
Years	Team	Apps	(Gls)
2015–2020	Liverpool	0	(0)
2015	→ SJK (loan)	8	(1)
2016	→ Sint-Truiden (loan)	9	(0)
2016–2017	→ Hertha BSC (loan)	15	(0)
2017–2018	→ Apollon Limassol (loan)	16	(0)
2018–2019	→ Eintracht Frankfurt (loan)	4	(0)
2019	→ Fluminense (loan)	35	(0)
2020–2023	Atlético Mineiro	131	(0)
2023–	Flamengo	62	(0)
2026–	→ Corinthians (loan)	26	(0)

International career
2016–2017	Brazil U20	7	(0)
2019	Brazil U23	1	(0)
- * Club domestic league appearances and goals as of 24 October 2026

Allan Rodrigues de Souza (born 3 March 1997), simply known as Allan, is a Brazilian professional footballer who plays as a midfielder for Campeonato Brasileiro Série A club Corinthians on loan from Flamengo.

== Club career ==
=== Internacional ===
Born in Araçatuba, São Paulo, Allan rose through the ranks as a youth product of Internacional. Goal Brazil’s deputy editor Rodrigo Calvozzo claimed Allan "was always treated by Internacional as one of the most important players in the team."

=== Liverpool ===
In the summer of 2015, he joined English Premier League club Liverpool for a fee of £500,000 after impressing the club's coaches at the Frenz International Cup.

==== Loans ====
On 2 September 2015, he was loaned to Finnish club Seinäjoen Jalkapallokerho (SJK) on a short term deal. Allan scored on his debut eight days later, coming on in the 56th minute for Jussi Vasara and opening the scoring sixteen minutes later in a 1–1 draw away to KuPS. He finished the season with one goal in eight appearances, in the process helping the club win the Veikkausliiga title. On 29 October 2015, Allan returned from his loan spell to Liverpool, greeting the new manager of the club, Jürgen Klopp, for the first time.

On 18 January 2016, Liverpool announced that Allan had been loaned to Belgian club Sint-Truiden for the remainder of the season. He then returned to Liverpool in expectation of receiving a British work permit, which was not granted.

Allan signed for Hertha BSC on 5 August 2016 on a season-long loan deal, after Klopp recommended him to Hertha head coach Pal Dardai.

On 31 August 2017, Allan joined Cypriot side Apollon Limassol on a season-long loan.

In July 2018 he signed a new deal with Liverpool and joined Eintracht Frankfurt on a season-long loan.

On 15 February 2019, Allan joined Brazilian side Fluminense on loan until the end of the season after his loan spell in Germany was cut short.

=== Atlético Mineiro ===
On 8 January 2020, Allan joined Atlético Mineiro on a four-year contract.

=== Flamengo ===
On 2 July 2023, Allan has been officially announced as Flamengo's new player. Mengão signed him from rivals Atlético Mineiro for a €8.2m transfer fee plus future bonus clauses.

== Style of play ==
A central midfielder by trade, Allan is primarily left-footed and has been known to have a strong passing range, as he played a deep-lying playmaker in Brazil. Allan has proven himself a useful box-to-box midfielder with aggressive attacking instincts.

== Career statistics ==
=== Club ===
As of match played 24 October 2026

Appearances and goals by club, season and competition
Club	Season	League			State league		National cup (Note: Includes Copa do Brasil, FA Cup, Finnish Cup, Belgian Cup, DFB Pokal and Cypriot Cup)		Continental		Other		Total	
Club	Season	Division	Apps	Goals	Apps	Goals	Apps	Goals	Apps	Goals	Apps	Goals	Apps	Goals
SJK (loan)	2015	Veikkausliiga	8	1	—		—		—		—		8	1
Sint-Truiden (loan)	2015–16	Belgian Pro League	9	0	—		—		—		—		9	0
Hertha BSC (loan)	2016–17	Bundesliga	15	0	—		1	0	—		—		16	0
Apollon Limassol (loan)	2017–18	Cypriot First Division	16	0	—		—		4 (Note: Appearance(s) in UEFA Europa League)	0	—		20	0
Eintracht Frankfurt (loan)	2018–19	Bundesliga	4	0	—		—		—		—		4	0
Fluminense (loan)	2019	Série A	28	0	7 (Note: Appearance(s) in Campeonato Carioca)	0	2	0	6 (Note: Appearance(s) in Copa Sudamericana)	0	—		43	0
Atlético Mineiro	2020	Série A	31	0	14 (Note: Appearancce(s) in Campeonato Mineiro)	0	2	0	1	0	—		48	0
Atlético Mineiro	2021	Série A	32	0	9	0	9	0	11 (Note: Appearance(s) in Copa Libertadores)	0	—		61	0
Atlético Mineiro	2022	Série A	33	0	8	0	3	0	8	0	1 (Note: Appearance(s) in Supercopa do Brasil)	0	53	0
Atlético Mineiro	2023	Série A	—		4	0	—		4	0	—		8	0
Atlético Mineiro	Total		96	0	35	0	14	0	24	0	1	0	170	0
Flamengo	2023	Série A	9	0	—		3	0	2	0	—		14	0
Flamengo	2024	Série A	24	0	6	0	5	0	5	0	—		40	0
Flamengo	2025	Série A	13	0	10	0	2	0	5	0	3 (Note: Appearance(s) in FIFA Club World Cup)	0	33	0
Flamengo	2026	Série A	—		1	0	—		—		—		1	0
Flamengo	Total		46	0	17	0	10	0	12	0	3	0	88	0
Corinthians (loan)	2026	Série A	23	0	3	0	4	0	7	0	0	0	37	0
Career total			245	1	62	0	31	0	53	0	4	0	395	1

== Honours ==
=== Club ===
SJK

- Veikkausliiga: 2015

Atlético Mineiro

- Campeonato Brasileiro Série A: 2021
- Supercopa do Brasil: 2022
- Copa do Brasil: 2021
- Campeonato Mineiro: 2020, 2021, 2022, 2023

Flamengo

- FIFA Challenger Cup: 2025
- FIFA Derby of the Americas: 2025
- Copa Libertadores: 2025
- Campeonato Brasileiro Série A: 2025
- Copa do Brasil: 2024
- Supercopa do Brasil: 2025
- Campeonato Carioca: 2024, 2025

=== Individual ===
- Campeonato Mineiro Team of the Tournament: 2020, 2022, 2023
