= Johannes Laaksonen =

Finnish footballer (born 1990)

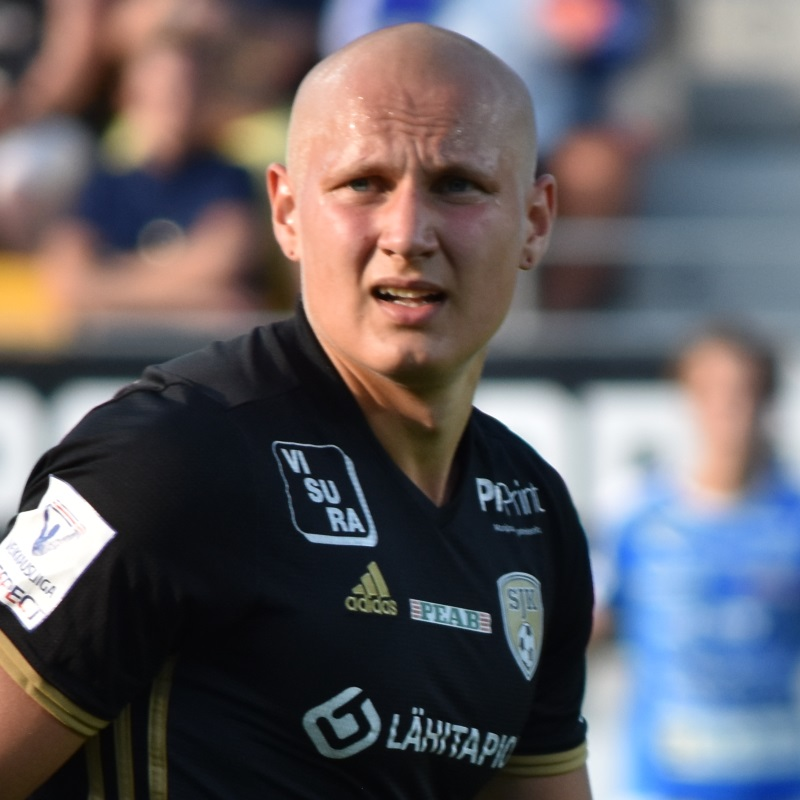
- Laaksonen with SJK in 2018.

Personal information
- Full name: Vesa Johannes Laaksonen
- Date of birth: 13 December 1990 (age 35)
- Place of birth: Kotka, Finland
- Height: 1.84 m (6 ft 1/2 in)
- Position: Midfielder

Youth career
- 2001–2004: KTP
- 2005–2009: KooTeePee

Senior career*
Years	Team	Apps	(Gls)
2010–2012	KooTeePee	86	(9)
2013–2019	SJK	165	(15)
2019–2020	Sandnes Ulf	14	(0)
2020	IFK Mariehamn	9	(0)
2021–2024	KTP	68	(8)

International career
2015–2016	Finland	3	(0)
- * Club domestic league appearances and goals as of 26 October 2024

Vesa Johannes Laaksonen (born 15 December 1990) is a Finnish former professional footballer who last played for his hometown club KTP. He has also represented the Finland national football team. Currently Laaksonen works as a conditioning coach of KTP.

Laaksonen announced his retirement after the 2024 season. He continued as a fitness coach of KTP.

== Career statistics ==
=== Club ===
As of 26 October 2024.

Appearances and goals by club, season and competition
Club	Season	League			Cup (Note: Includes Suomen Cup and Norwegian Cup)		League cup (Note: Includes Finnish League Cup, Ykköscup and Ykkösliigacup)		Europe		Total	
Club	Season	Division	Apps	Goals	Apps	Goals	Apps	Goals	Apps	Goals	Apps	Goals
KooTeePee	2009	Ykkönen	16	1	–		–		–		16	1
KooTeePee	2010	Ykkönen	21	0	–		–		–		21	0
KooTeePee	2011	Ykkönen	22	5	–		–		–		22	5
KooTeePee	2012	Ykkönen	27	3	4	1	–		–		31	4
KooTeePee	Total		86	9	4	1	0	0	0	0	90	10
SJK	2013	Ykkönen	25	1	1	0	–		–		26	1
SJK	2014	Veikkausliiga	31	5	2	0	6	1	–		39	6
SJK	2015	Veikkausliiga	32	2	1	0	3	0	2 (Note: Appearances in UEFA Europa League)	0	38	2
SJK	2016	Veikkausliiga	24	0	3	0	3	0	2 (Note: Appearances in UEFA Champions League)	0	32	0
SJK	2017	Veikkausliiga	25	1	8	2	–		2	0	35	3
SJK	2018	Veikkausliiga	28	6	1	0	–		–		29	6
SJK	Total		165	15	16	2	12	1	6	0	199	18
Sandnes Ulf	2019	1. divisjon	14	0	2	0	–		–		16	0
Sandnes Ulf 2	2019	4. divisjon	5	2	–		–		–		5	2
IFK Mariehamn	2020	Veikkausliiga	9	0	–		–		–		9	0
KTP	2021	Veikkausliiga	21	1	3	0	–		–		24	1
KTP	2022	Ykkönen	25	3	3	0	4	0	–		32	3
KTP	2023	Veikkausliiga	13	0	3	1	3	0	–		19	1
KTP	2024	Ykkösliiga	9	4	0	0	0	0	–		9	4
KTP	Total		68	8	9	1	7	0	0	0	84	9
Career total			347	34	31	4	19	1	6	0	403	39

=== International ===
As of match played 13 January 2016

Finland
Year	Apps	Goals
2015	1	0
2016	2	0
Total	3	0

== Honours ==
SJK

- Veikkausliiga: 2015
- Veikkausliiga runner-up: 2014
- Ykkönen: 2013
- Finnish Cup: 2016
- Finnish League Cup: 2014

KTP

- Ykkönen: 2022
- Ykkösliiga: 2024
