= Richie Dorman =

English-born Welsh footballer

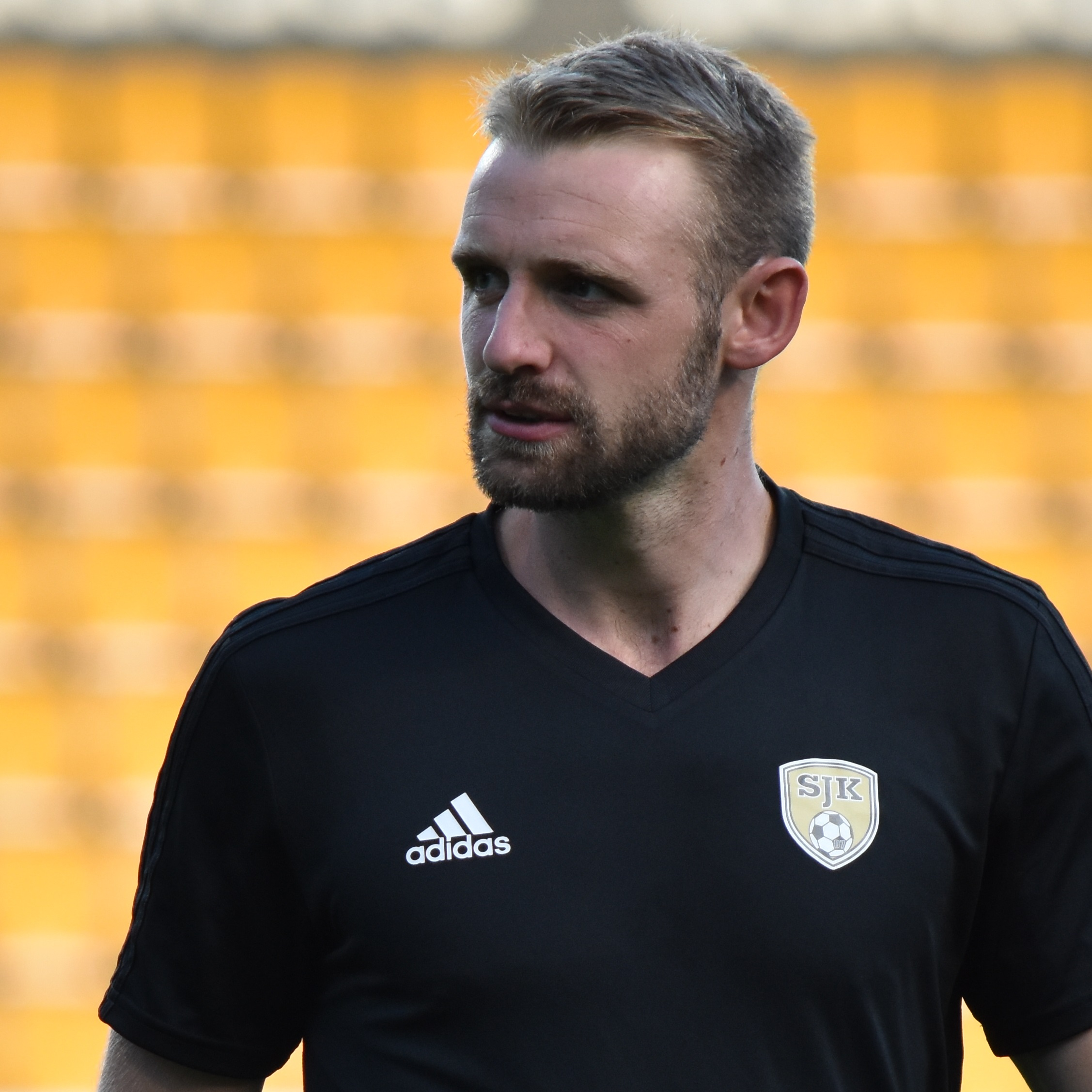
- Dorman with SJK in 2018.

Personal information
- Date of birth: 14 June 1988 (age 38)
- Place of birth: Chester, England
- Height: 5 ft 11 in (1.80 m)
- Position: Midfielder

Team information
- Current team: Burton Albion (sporting director)

Youth career
- Blackburn Rovers

College career
Years	Team	Apps	(Gls)
2006–2009	Boston University Terriers	77	(3)

Senior career*
Years	Team	Apps	(Gls)
2005–2006	Airbus UK	17	(1)
2006	New Hampshire Phantoms		
2010–2011	Airbus UK Broughton	20	(0)
2011	→ Närpes Kraft (loan)	24	(11)
2012–2018	SJK	141	(6)

Managerial career
- 2019–2025: SJK (technical director)
- 2025–: Burton Albion (sporting director)
- * Club domestic league appearances and goals as of 4 November 2018

Richie Dorman (born 14 June 1988) is a Welsh retired professional footballer, currently working as a sporting director for Burton Albion.

== Early and personal life ==
Dorman, from Hawarden, is the brother of fellow player Andy Dorman.

== Career ==
Dorman played for the academy of English club Blackburn Rovers, and played in the United States for the New Hampshire Phantoms in 2006. While in the United States, he also played amateur football for the Boston University Terriers. He also had two spells in his native Wales with Airbus UK. Dorman joined Finnish club Kraft on loan in April 2011. He later played for SJK. Dorman was named in the Veikkausliiga 'Team of the Month' in June 2014.

On 30 October 2018, Finnish Veikkausliiga club SJK Seinäjoki announced Dorman as their new technical director.

In May 2025, Dorman left SJK and was appointed the sporting director of League One club Burton Albion.

== Honours ==
SJK Seinäjoki

- Veikkausliiga: 2015
- Finnish Cup: 2016
- Finnish League Cup: 2014
- Ykkönen: 2012
