= Jere Koponen =

Finnish footballer (born 1992)

Personal information
- Date of birth: 23 May 1992 (age 34)
- Place of birth: Turku, Finland
- Height: 1.86 m (6 ft 1 in)
- Position: Goalkeeper

Team information
- Current team: Peimari United

Youth career
- TPS
- Inter Turku

Senior career*
Years	Team	Apps	(Gls)
2010–2014	Inter Turku	14	(0)
2011	→ TuTo (loan)	11	(0)
2012	→ KTP (loan)	9	(0)
2015–2016	SJK	3	(0)
2017–2018	Inter Turku	24	(0)
2019	Palanga	4	(0)
2019–2023	TPS	102	(0)
2024	SalPa	16	(0)
2024	EIF	1	(0)
2025–	Peimari United	0	(0)
- * Club domestic league appearances and goals as of 28 August 2024

Jere Koponen (born 23 May 1992) is a Finnish football goalkeeper for Peimari United in Kolmonen.

== Club career ==
Koponen started his career at FC Inter Turku and won the Finnish U19 championship with his club in 2011. In April 2012, he joined KTP on loan until August, but he returned to FC Inter already in June after having made 9 appearances for KTP. In December 2012, he extended his contract with FC Inter until end of 2014. For the 2015 season he joined SJK on a one-year contract and won the Finnish championship as second goalkeeper behind Mihkel Aksalu with one appearance during the season.

Koponen left Inter Turku for the second time, at the end of the 2018 season.

From spring 2019 he is a member of Lithuanian FK Palanga. In summer 2019 he left FK Palanga. In August 2019, he then returned to his former club, TPS.

== Career statistics ==
As of 28 August 2024.

Appearances and goals by club, season and competition
Club	Season	League			Cup (Note: Includes Suomen Cup)		League cup (Note: Includes Finnish League Cup, Ykköscup and Ykkösliigacup)		Europe		Total	
Club	Season	Division	Apps	Goals	Apps	Goals	Apps	Goals	Apps	Goals	Apps	Goals
Inter Turku	2010	Veikkausliiga	0	0	0	0	–		–		0	0
Inter Turku	2011	Veikkausliiga	0	0	0	0	–		–		0	0
Inter Turku	2012	Veikkausliiga	0	0	0	0	0	0	0	0	0	0
Inter Turku	2013	Veikkausliiga	8	0	1	0	0	0	0	0	9	0
Inter Turku	2014	Veikkausliiga	7	0	1	0	3	0	–		11	0
Inter Turku	Total		15	0	2	0	3	0	0	0	20	0
TuTo (loan)	2011	Kakkonen	11	0	0	0	–		–		11	0
KTP (loan)	2012	Kakkonen	9	0	0	0	–		–		9	0
SJK	2015	Veikkausliiga	1	0	0	0	2	0	–		3	0
SJK	2016	Veikkausliiga	2	0	3	0	2	0	0	0	7	0
SJK	Total		3	0	3	0	4	0	0	0	10	0
SJK Akatemia	2015	Kakkonen	9	0	–		–		–		9	0
SJK Akatemia	2016	Kolmonen	1	0	–		–		–		1	0
SJK Akatemia	Total		10	0	0	0	0	0	0	0	10	0
Inter Turku	2017	Veikkausliiga	8	0	0	0	–		–		8	0
Inter Turku	2018	Veikkausliiga	16	0	3	0	–		–		19	0
Inter Turku	Total		24	0	3	0	0	0	0	0	27	0
Palanga	2019	A Lyga	4	0	0	0	–		–		4	0
TPS	2019	Ykkönen	6	0	–		–		–		6	0
TPS	2020	Veikkausliiga	24	0	7	0	–		–		31	0
TPS	2021	Ykkönen	27	0	0	0	–		–		27	0
TPS	2022	Ykkönen	19	0	2	0	2	0	–		23	0
TPS	2023	Ykkönen	26	0	0	0	2	0	–		28	0
TPS	Total		102	0	9	0	4	0	0	0	15	0
SalPa	2024	Ykkösliiga	16	0	0	0	1	0	–		17	0
Ekenäs IF	2024	Veikkausliiga	1	0	–		–		–		1	0
Peimari United	2025	Kolmonen	0	0	0	0	–		–		0	0
Career total			195	0	17	0	12	0	0	0	224	0

== Honours ==
SJK

- Veikkausliiga: 2015
- Finnish League Cup runner-up: 2016

TPS

- Ykkönen runner-up: 2019, 2022
- Ykköscup runner-up: 2022

Individual

- Ykkönen Goalkeeper of the Year: 2021, 2022
