= Kasper Paananen =

Finnish footballer (born 2003)

Personal information
- Full name: Kasper Paananen
- Date of birth: 16 March 2003 (age 23)
- Place of birth: Helsinki, Finland
- Positions: Midfielder; winger

Team information
- Current team: Kalmar FF (on loan from SJK)

Youth career
- OLS
- –2016: ORPa
- 2017: OTP
- 2018–2019: OLS
- 2019–2023: Bologna

Senior career*
Years	Team	Apps	(Gls)
2023	SJK II	26	(8)
2023–	SJK	77	(30)
2026–	→ Kalmar FF (loan)	0	(0)

International career^{‡}
2018–2019	Finland U16	9	(7)
2019	Finland U17	6	(1)
2021	Finland U19	1	(0)
2026–	Finland	1	(0)
- * Club domestic league appearances and goals as of 26 July 2026 ‡ National team caps and goals as of 31 March 2026

Kasper Vili Valtteri Paananen (born 16 March 2003) is a Finnish professional footballer who plays as a midfielder or winger for Allsvenskan club Kalmar FF, on loan from SJK Seinäjoki and the Finland national team.

== Career ==
Paananen was born in Helsinki but moved to Oulu with his family at an early age. He played for OLS, OPS, Oulun Rotuaarin Pallo and OTP in his youth years, before he moved to Italy in 2019 and signed with Bologna organisation. Paananen spent four years in Italy, played 61 matches, and scored 20 goals in total for the youth academy teams of Bologna, before leaving in 2023.

He spent time with AIK, Trelleborgs FF, and played one match for Honka in Finnish League Cup, before signing with SJK Seinäjoki. He was first registered to the club's academy squad SJK Akatemia, playing in the second tier Ykkönen. For the next 2024 Veikkausliiga season, Paananen was promoted to the first team. In his first season in the league, Paananen made 28 appearances and scored eight goals. He started the 2025 season strong and scored four goals in the first four matches, helping SJK to start the season with the club's record-breaking four consecutive wins. Paananen was named the Veikkausliiga Player of the Month for April and August 2025.

== Personal life ==
His younger brother Julius Paananen is also a professional football player for AC Oulu. The former professional ice hockey player Jari Viuhkola is his maternal uncle.

== Career statistics ==
As of 13 November 2025

Appearances and goals by club, season and competition
Club	Season	League			Finnish Cup		League cup		Europe		Total	
Club	Season	Division	Apps	Goals	Apps	Goals	Apps	Goals	Apps	Goals	Apps	Goals
Honka	2023	Veikkausliiga	0	0	0	0	1	0	0	0	1	0
SJK Akatemia	2023	Ykkönen	26	8	–		–		–		26	8
SJK	2023	Veikkausliiga	1	0	1	0	0	0	–		2	0
SJK	2024	Veikkausliiga	28	8	6	3	4	1	–		38	12
SJK	2025	Veikkausliiga	32	18	3	1	4	0	2 (Note: Appearances in UEFA Conference League)	0	41	19
SJK	2026	Veikkausliiga	16	4	4	4	1	0	–		21	9
SJK	Total		77	30	14	8	9	1	2	0	102	40
Kalmar FF (loan)	2026	Allsvenskan	0	0	0	0	–		–		0	0
Career total			103	38	14	8	10	1	2	0	129	48

=== International ===
As of match played 27 March 2026

National team	Year	Competitive		Friendly		Total	
National team	Year	Apps	Goals	Apps	Goals	Apps	Goals
Finland	2026	0	0	1 (Note: One appearance in the 2026 FIFA Series.)	0	1	0
Total		0	0	1	0	1	0

== Honours ==
Finland

- FIFA Series: 2026

Individual

- Veikkausliiga Player of the Year 2025
- Veikkausliiga Striker of the Year 2025
- Veikkausliiga Top Goalscorer 2025
- Ruutu Star Player of the Year 2025
- Veikkausliiga Player of the Month: April 2025, August 2025
