= 2013 Ykkönen =

Ykkönen
- Season: 2013
- Champions: SJK
- Promoted: SJK
- Relegated: OPS; Kajaani
- Matches: 130
- Goals: 349 (2.68 per match)
- Top goalscorer: Jussi Aalto (13 goals)
- Biggest home win: PK-35 Vantaa 7–1 OPS (31 August)
- Biggest away win: AC Kajaani 1–7 SJK (30 June)
- Highest scoring: AC Kajaani 1–7 SJK (30 June); FC Viikingit 5–3 AC Kajaani (20 July); PK-35 Vantaa 7–1 OPS (31 August)

The 2013 Ykkönen season began on 29 April 2013 and ended on 5 October 2013. The winning team was directly promoted to the 2014 Veikkausliiga. The bottom two teams were relegated to Kakkonen.

== Overview ==
Location of teams in Ykkönen 2013

A total of ten teams will contest in the league, including seven sides from the 2012 season, Haka who was relegated from Veikkausliiga and AC Kajaani and Ilves who promoted from Kakkonen after winning the promotion play-offs.

FC Hämeenlinna and HIFK were relegated from 2012 Ykkönen. RoPS was promoted to the 2013 Veikkausliiga.

Club	Location	Stadium	Capacity	Manager
AC Kajaani	Kajaani	Kajaanin liikuntapuisto	1,000	(Finland) Mika Lumijärvi
AC Oulu	Oulu	Raatin Stadion	6,996	(Finland) Rauno Ojanen
FC KooTeePee	Kotka	Arto Tolsa Areena	4,780	(Finland) Sami Ristilä
FC Viikingit	Helsinki	Vuosaaren urheilukenttä	4,200	(Finland) Ilkka Jäntti
Haka	Valkeakoski	Tehtaan kenttä	3,516	(Finland) Juho Rantala
Ilves	Tampere	Tammela Stadion	5,040	(Finland) Mika Malinen
JIPPO	Joensuu	Joensuun keskuskenttä	3,000	(Finland) Jarmo Korhonen
OPS	Oulu	Raatin Stadion	6,996	(Brazil) Luiz Antônio
PK-35 Vantaa	Vantaa	ISS Stadion	4,500	(Finland) Ilir Zeneli
SJK	Seinäjoki	Seinäjoen keskuskenttä	3,500	(Finland) Simo Valakari

=== Managerial changes ===
Team	Outgoing manager	Manner of departure	Date of vacancy	Incoming manager	Date of appointment	Table
AC Oulu	(Finland) Juha Malinen	End of contract	n/a	(Finland) Rauno Ojanen	3 October 2012	Pre-season
FC KooTeePee	(Finland) Janne Hyppönen	End of contract	n/a	(Finland) Sami Ristilä	6 November 2012	Pre-season
Haka	(Finland) Juha Malinen	End of loan	n/a	(Finland) Harri Kampman	12 November 2012	Pre-season
Haka	(Finland) Harri Kampman	Sacked	23 June 2013	(Finland) Asko Jussila (as caretaker)	23 June 2013	2nd
Haka	(Finland) Asko Jussila	End of tenure as caretaker	7 July 2013	(Finland) Juho Rantala	8 July 2013	2nd
PK-35 Vantaa	(Finland) Pasi Pihamaa	Sacked	15 July 2013	(Finland) Ilir Zeneli (as caretaker)	15 July 2013	7th

== League table ==
Pos	Team	Pld	W	D	L	GF	GA	GD	Pts	Promotion or relegation
1	SJK (C, P)	27	18	5	4	51	17	+34	59	Promotion to Veikkausliiga
2	Haka	27	15	9	3	44	17	+27	54	
3	FC KooTeePee	27	12	9	6	35	29	+6	45	
4	Ilves	27	11	8	8	46	38	+8	41	
5	AC Oulu	27	11	7	9	36	38	−2	40	
6	PK-35 Vantaa	27	8	6	13	35	43	−8	30	
7	FC Viikingit	27	7	8	12	35	39	−4	29	
8	JIPPO	27	7	8	12	18	30	−12	29	
9	OPS (R)	27	7	7	13	40	50	−10	28	Relegation to Kakkonen
10	Kajaani (R)	27	3	5	19	27	66	−39	14	Relegation to Kakkonen

Source: palloverkko.palloliitto.fi
Rules for classification: 1) points; 2) goal difference; 3) number of goals scored.
(C) Champions; (P) Promoted; (R) Relegated

== Results ==
=== Matches 1–18 ===
Home \ Away	KAJ	ACO	KTP	VII	HAK	ILV	JIP	OPS	PKV	SJK
Kajaani		1–2	1–2	2–1	2–2	1–2	0–1	1–1	1–0	1–7
AC Oulu	3–2		3–3	0–2	0–1	2–2	1–0	3–1	1–0	2–1
FC KooTeePee	1–0	0–0		1–1	1–0	4–0	1–0	4–2	0–0	0–4
FC Viikingit	5–3	0–2	1–1		1–0	0–1	1–1	3–0	0–2	1–2
Haka	1–0	3–0	2–1	3–1		3–0	2–0	3–1	1–1	0–0
Ilves	3–0	6–1	0–0	1–0	1–1		5–0	2–1	5–0	2–4
JIPPO	1–1	0–1	0–1	0–0	0–0	2–1		2–1	0–1	0–2
OPS	3–3	0–0	1–2	1–0	1–2	0–0	2–0		2–0	2–0
PK-35 Vantaa	3–3	1–1	5–0	2–1	0–2	1–3	1–1	2–3		0–3
SJK	2–0	1–1	2–0	2–2	1–1	1–2	2–0	2–0	2–1	

Source: palloverkko.palloliitto.fi
Legend: Blue = home team win; Yellow = draw; Red = away team win.

=== Matches 19–27 ===
Home \ Away	KAJ	ACO	KTP	VII	HAK	ILV	JIP	OPS	PKV	SJK
Kajaani				0–3	1–2		0–3 (Note: The match originally finished 4–0, but AC Kajaani fielded an ineligible player.)		2–3	
AC Oulu	4–0		0–1	2–3		5–2				
FC KooTeePee	2–0				1–1		0–0	5–0		
FC Viikingit			3–1		0–3	1–1	1–1			0–2
Haka		4–0				0–0		3–1	3–1	0–0
Ilves	0–2		2–2				1–2			1–3
JIPPO		2–0			2–1				0–0	0–1
OPS	8–0	1–1		3–3		1–1	3–0			
PK-35 Vantaa		0–1	1–0	2–1		1–2		7–1		
SJK	1–0	1–0	0–1					1–0	4–0	

Source: palloverkko.palloliitto.fi
Legend: Blue = home team win; Yellow = draw; Red = away team win.

== Statistics ==
Updated to games played on 29 September 2013.

=== Top scorers ===
Source: palloverkko.palloliitto.fi

Rank	Player	Club	Goals
1	(Finland) Jussi Aalto	Haka	13
2	(Finland) Kalle Multanen	Ilves	12
2	(Finland) Fidan Seferi	PK-35 Vantaa	12
4	(Finland) Jonne Hjelm	Ilves	11
5	(Finland) Toni Lehtinen	SJK	10

== Monthly awards ==
Month	Player of the Month
May	(Estonia) Gert Kams (SJK)
June	(Finland) Kalle Multanen (Ilves)
July	(Ivory Coast) Venance Zézé (Haka)
August	(Brazil) Daniel Caumo (SJK)
September	(Finland) Akseli Pelvas (SJK)

== See also ==
- 2013 Veikkausliiga
- 2013 Kakkonen
