= Ariel Ngueukam =

Cameroonian footballer (born 1988)

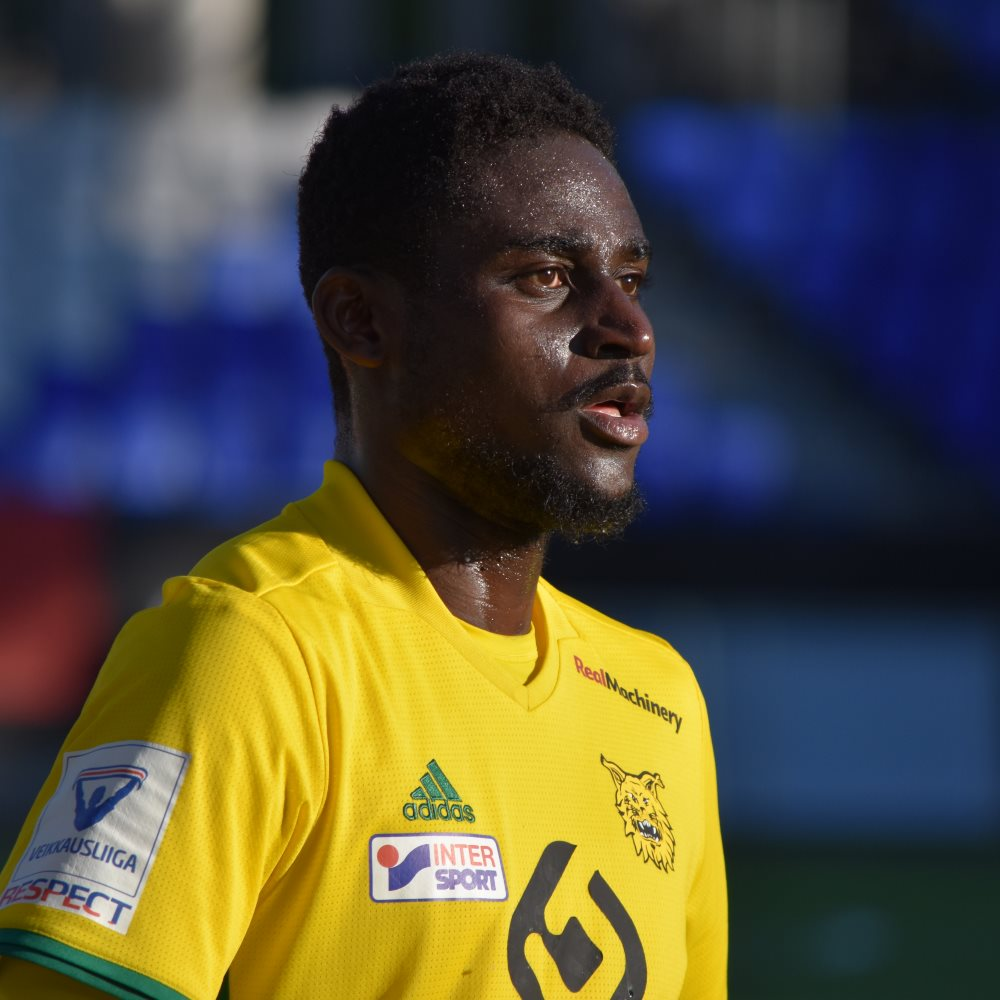
- Ngueukam with Ilves

Personal information
- Full name: Ariel Thierry Ngueukam
- Date of birth: 15 November 1988 (age 37)
- Place of birth: Yaoundé, Cameroon
- Height: 1.85 m (6 ft 1 in)
- Position: Forward

Senior career*
Years	Team	Apps	(Gls)
2011–2012	JIPPO	34	(17)
2012	Lahti	9	(7)
2012–2013	Denizlispor	10	(1)
2013–2014	Lahti	37	(12)
2015–2016	SJK	64	(9)
2017	Ilves	32	(15)
2017	HJK	0	(0)
2018	Al-Khor	10	(3)
2018–2019	Hapoel Ra'anana	15	(1)
2019	KuPS	12	(4)
2020–2021	SJK	44	(18)
2022	Ilves	25	(6)
2023	IFK Mariehamn	28	(6)
2024	United City	14	(14)
Total		359	(113)
- * Club domestic league appearances and goals

Ariel Thierry Ngueukam (born 15 November 1988) is a Cameroonian former professional footballer who played as a forward.

== Career ==
Born in Yaoundé, Ngueukam began playing football as a striker with local sides FC Achille de Sa'a and FC Lotus-Terek. After unsuccessful trials with clubs in Hungary and Bulgaria, he signed with Finnish second division club JIPPO in 2011, where he scored 13 goals in his first 11 matches.

In 2012, he moved to FC Lahti in the Finnish first division. Ngueukam scored two goals on his debut for FC Lahti on 31 August 2012. Ngueukam signed for Turkish club Denizlispor in January 2013, but returned FC Lahti, playing with them in the 2013 and 2014 seasons. He moved to SJK for the 2015 season, and Ilves for the 2017 season.

On 6 November 2017, Ngueukam signed a two-year contract with HJK Helsinki for the 2018 and 2019 seasons. In January 2018 Ngueukam joined Al-Khor in Qatar, without having played for HJK.

On 11 July 2018, Ngueukam signed to the Israeli Premier League club Hapoel Ra'anana.

In June 2019 he returned to Finland to sign for KuPS.

In November 2019, it was announced that Tuco would return to SJK for the 2020 season. In the 2021 season he scored 14 goals for SJK in Veikkausliiga, making him the joint top scorer of the season alongside Benjamin Källman.

On 17 March 2022, Ngueukam returned to Ilves for the 2022 season, with an option to extend for 2023. Following a season with the club, he joined IFK Mariehamn for the 2023 season.

In March 2024 he signed for Filipino club United City.

== Personal life ==
He is nicknamed "Tuco".

== Career statistics ==
As of 5 January 2025

Appearances and goals by club, season and competition
Club	Season	League			National cup		Continental		Other		Total	
Club	Season	Division	Apps	Goals	Apps	Goals	Apps	Goals	Apps	Goals	Apps	Goals
JIPPO	2011	Ykkönen	17	6	0	0	–		–		17	6
JIPPO	2012	Ykkönen	17	11	4	2	–		–		21	13
JIPPO	Total		34	17	4	2	0	0	0	0	38	19
Lahti	2012	Veikkausliiga	9	7	0	0	–		0	0	9	7
Denizlispor	2012–13	TFF 1. Lig	10	1	0	0	–		–		10	1
Lahti	2013	Veikkausliiga	8	5	0	0	–		0	0	8	5
Lahti	2014	Veikkausliiga	29	7	3	2	–		4	1	36	10
Lahti	Total		37	12	3	2	0	0	4	1	44	15
SJK	2015	Veikkausliiga	32	5	1	0	2	0	4	2	39	7
SJK	2016	Veikkausliiga	32	4	5	4	2	1	6	2	44	11
SJK	Total		64	9	6	4	4	1	10	4	84	18
Ilves	2017	Veikkausliiga	32	15	5	3	–		–		37	18
Al-Khor	2017–18	Qatar Stars League	10	3	0	0	–		–		10	3
Hapoel Ra'anana	2018–19	Israeli Premier League	15	1	1	0	–		–		16	1
KuPS	2019	Veikkausliiga	12	4	0	0	4	0	–		16	4
SJK Seinäjoki	2020	Veikkausliiga	18	4	1	0	–		–		19	4
SJK Seinäjoki	2021	Veikkausliiga	26	14	4	0	–		–		30	18
SJK Seinäjoki	Total		44	18	5	0	0	0	0	0	49	18
Ilves	2022	Veikkausliiga	25	6	2	2	–		0	0	27	8
IFK Mariehamn	2023	Veikkausliiga	26	6	5	2	–		2	0	33	8
United City	2024	Philippines Football League	14	14	–		–		–		14	14
Career total			332	113	31	15	8	1	16	5	387	134

== Honours ==
Individual

- Veikkausliiga Team of the Year: 2017
- Veikkausliiga Top scorer: 2021 (14 goals)
- Veikkausliiga Player of the Month: October 2021
