= Timo Tahvanainen =

Finnish footballer (born 1986)

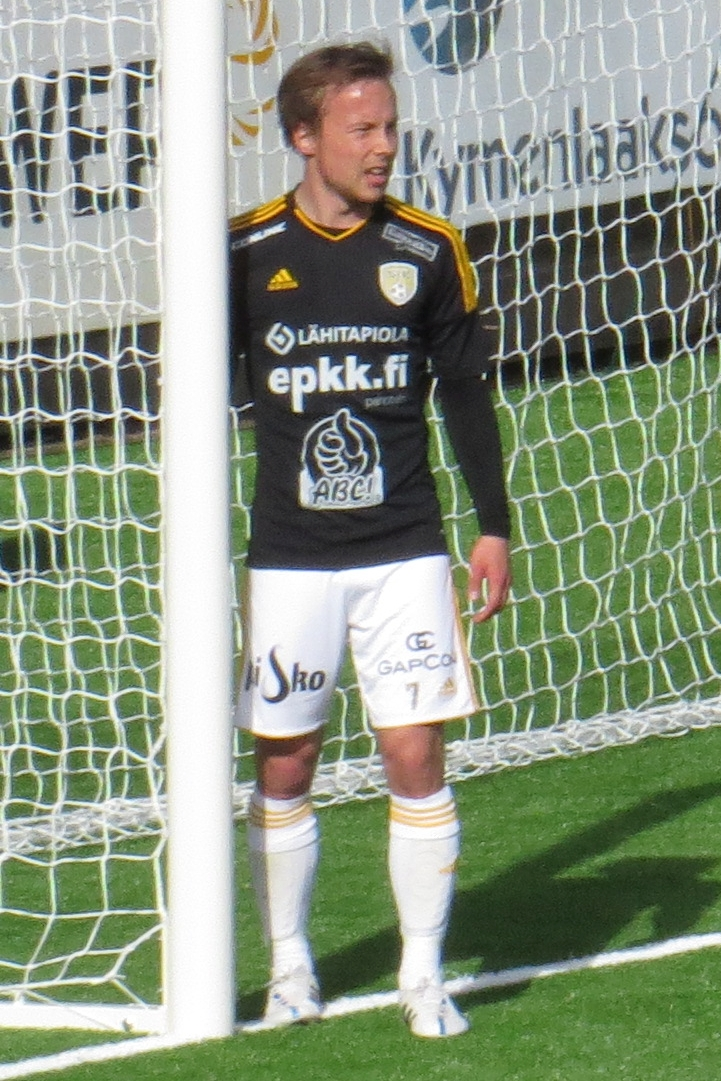

Personal information
- Full name: Timo Tahvanainen
- Date of birth: 26 June 1986 (age 40)
- Place of birth: Outokumpu, Finland
- Height: 1.73 m (5 ft 8 in)
- Position: Defender

Youth career
- 1997–2000: Oupa
- 2001: Ratanat
- 2002: Jippo

Senior career*
| Years | Team | Apps | (Gls) |
| 2003–2005 | KuPS | 2 | (0) |
| 2004–2005 | → KuFu-98 (loan) | 34 | (9) |
| 2006 | Kings Kuopio | 18 | (3) |
| 2007–2010 | Jippo | 95 | (9) |
| 2011–2012 | FF Jaro | 44 | (2) |
| 2011 | → KPV Kokkola (loan) | 8 | (0) |
| 2013–2017 | SJK | 96 | (3) |
| 2013–2015 | → SJK Akatemia | 3 | (0) |
| 2018–2022 | Jippo | 106 | (4) |

International career^{‡}
| 2016 | Finland | 2 | (0) |
- * Club domestic league appearances and goals as of 20 May 2018 ‡ National team caps and goals as of 10 February 2016

Timo Tahvanainen (born 26 June 1986) is a Finnish former football player. After his retirement, he has been working with Jippo as a club director.

== Career ==
=== International ===
Tahvanainen made his debut for Finland on 10 January 2016 against Sweden.

== Career statistics ==
=== Club ===
As of match played 19 July 2016

Appearances and goals by club, season and competition
| Club | Season | League | | | National Cup | | League Cup | | Continental | | Other | | Total | |
| Club | Season | Division | Apps | Goals | Apps | Goals | Apps | Goals | Apps | Goals | Apps | Goals | Apps | Goals |
|---|---|---|---|---|---|---|---|---|---|---|---|---|---|---|
| FF Jaro | 2011 | Veikkausliiga | 14 | 0 | 0 | 0 | 7 | 2 | - | | - | | 21 | 2 |
| FF Jaro | 2012 | Veikkausliiga | 30 | 2 | 1 | 0 | 4 | 0 | - | | - | | 35 | 2 |
| FF Jaro | Total | | 44 | 2 | 1 | 0 | 11 | 2 | - | - | - | - | 56 | 4 |
| KPV Kokkola (loan) | 2011 | Ykkönen | 8 | 0 | 0 | 0 | – | | – | | – | | 8 | 0 |
| SJK | 2013 | Ykkönen | 15 | 1 | 0 | 0 | - | | - | | - | | 15 | 1 |
| SJK | 2014 | Veikkausliiga | 26 | 1 | 2 | 0 | 6 | 0 | - | | - | | 34 | 1 |
| SJK | 2015 | Veikkausliiga | 26 | 1 | 1 | 0 | 2 | 0 | 2 | 0 | - | | 31 | 1 |
| SJK | 2016 | Veikkausliiga | 8 | 0 | 3 | 1 | 6 | 0 | 2 | 0 | - | | 19 | 1 |
| SJK | Total | | 75 | 3 | 6 | 1 | 13 | 0 | 4 | 0 | - | - | 98 | 3 |
| Kerho 07 (loan) | 2013 | Kakkonen | 1 | 0 | 0 | 0 | – | | – | | – | | 1 | 0 |
| Kerho 07 (loan) | 2014 | Kakkonen | 1 | 0 | 0 | 0 | – | | – | | – | | 1 | 0 |
| Kerho 07 (loan) | 2015 | Kakkonen | 1 | 0 | 0 | 0 | – | | – | | – | | 1 | 0 |
| Kerho 07 (loan) | Total | | 3 | 0 | 0 | 0 | - | - | - | - | - | - | 3 | 0 |
| Career total | | | 130 | 5 | 7 | 1 | 24 | 2 | 4 | 0 | - | - | 165 | 8 |

=== International ===
Finland
| Year | Apps | Goals |
|---|---|---|
| 2016 | 1 | 0 |
| Total | 1 | 0 |

Statistics accurate as of match played 10 January 2016

== Honours ==
=== Club ===
SJK

- Veikkausliiga (1): 2015
- Liigacup (1): 2014
