= Jari Sara =

Finnish footballer (born 1989)

Personal information
- Date of birth: 25 April 1989 (age 37)
- Place of birth: Pattijoki, Finland
- Height: 1.72 m (5 ft 8 in)
- Position: Defender

Youth career
- FF Jaro

Senior career*
Years	Team	Apps	(Gls)
2006–2015	FF Jaro	131	(1)
2006	→ JBK (loan)	7	(0)

International career
2008–2009	Finland U-20	11	(0)
- * Club domestic league appearances and goals

Jari Sara (born 25 April 1989) is a Finnish former footballer who played as a defender.
