= Akseli Pelvas =

Finnish footballer (born 1989)

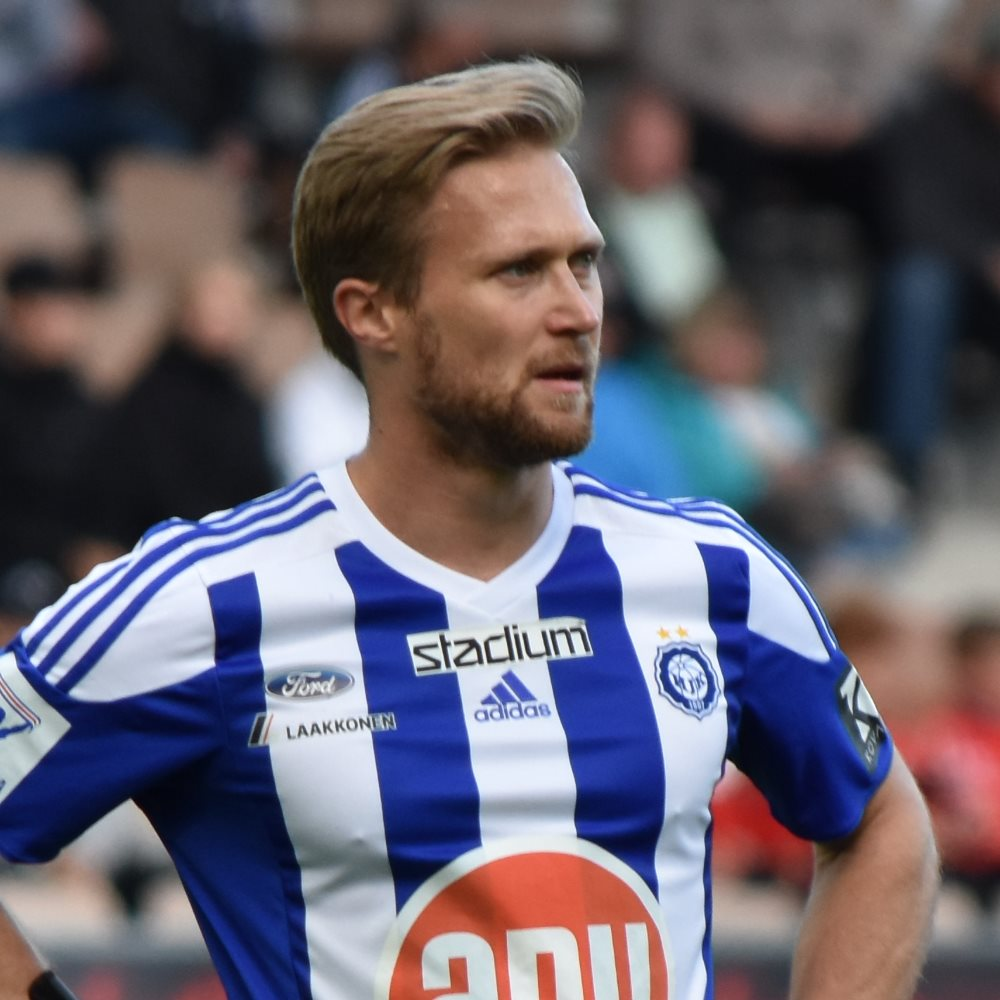
- Pelvas with HJK in 2017

Personal information
- Date of birth: 8 February 1989 (age 37)
- Place of birth: Espoo, Finland
- Height: 1.80 m (5 ft 11 in)
- Position: Striker

Youth career
- 1994–2003: EsPa
- 2003–2007: HJK Helsinki

Senior career*
Years	Team	Apps	(Gls)
2005–2006	Klubi 04	13	(7)
2007–2013	HJK Helsinki	89	(33)
2007–2010	→ Klubi 04	49	(34)
2008	→ IFK Mariehamn (loan)	4	(0)
2013	→ KuPS (loan)	4	(0)
2013	→ SJK (loan)	13	(6)
2014–2015	SJK	62	(25)
2016	Falkenbergs FF	14	(0)
2016–2020	HJK Helsinki	54	(19)
2019	→ Klubi 04	1	(0)
2020	IFK Mariehamn	20	(3)
Total		323	(127)

International career^{‡}
- Finland U-19
	Finland U-21	14	(2)
2012–	Finland	8	(1)
- * Club domestic league appearances and goals as of 15:49, 17 September 2020 (UTC) ‡ National team caps and goals as of 11 January 2018

Akseli Pelvas (born 8 February 1989) is a retired Finnish footballer who played as a striker.

== Career ==
=== Club ===
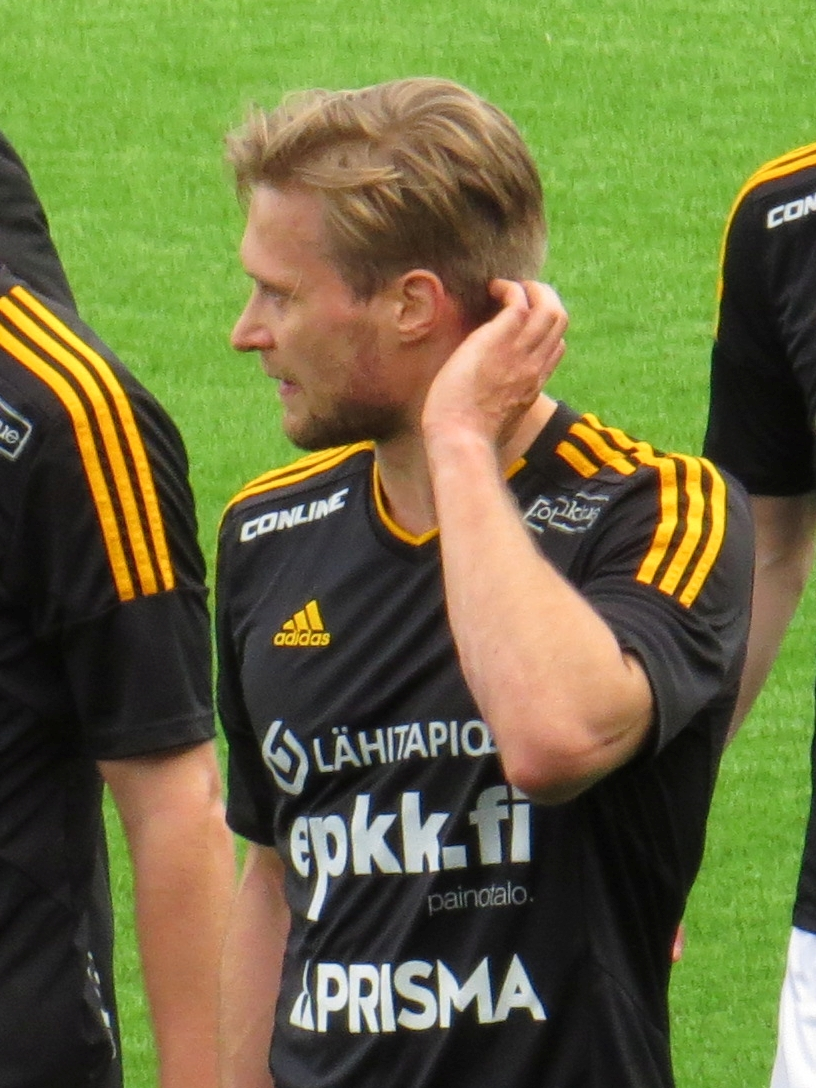
Pelvas with SJK in 2015

Pelvas got started with football in the age of five, when he joined EsPa in Espoo. In 2003, he joined HJK’s juniors at the age of 14. After just two years, he was promoted to HJK’s reserve side Klubi 04.

Pelvas made his first team debut at the age of 18 in a 1–1 draw against FC Inter Turku on 28 June 2007. He spent most of the 2008 season in the reserves, scoring 24 goals in 17 games. In the middle of the 2008 season he was on loan at IFK Mariehamn. He scored his first two goals on 19 October 2008 in a 2–3 away victory against FC Haka.

On 22 February 2009, Pelvas signed a three-year deal with HJK. On 16 December 2015, Pelvas signed for the Swedish club Falkenbergs FF. He returned to HJK in August 2016.

After spending the 2020 season back with IFK Mariehamn, Pelvas announced his retirement in September 2021.

== Career statistics ==
As of on 31 December 2020

Appearances and goals by club, season and competition
Club	Season	League			Cup		League cup		Europe		Total	
Club	Season	Division	Apps	Goals	Apps	Goals	Apps	Goals	Apps	Goals	Apps	Goals
HJK	2007	Veikkausliiga	2	0	–		–		–		2	0
HJK	2008	Veikkausliiga	3	2	0	0	—				3	2
HJK	2009	Veikkausliiga	19	5	0	0	—		2 (Note: Appearance(s) in the UEFA Europa League)	0	21	5
HJK	2010	Veikkausliiga	12	2	1	0	6	5	5 (Note: Three Appearances in the UEFA Champions League, Two Appearances in the UEFA Europa League)	0	24	7
HJK	2011	Veikkausliiga	26	16	3	0	6	1	2 (Note: Appearance(s) in the UEFA Champions League)	0	37	17
HJK	2012	Veikkausliiga	22	8	3	0	4	2	3 (Note: Two Appearances in the UEFA Champions League, One Appearance in the UEFA Europa League)	0	32	10
HJK	2013	Veikkausliiga	4	0	0	0	5	3	—		9	3
HJK	Total		83	33	7	0	21	11	12	0	123	44
Klubi 04	2009	Ykkönen	5	3	—						5	3
Klubi 04	2010	Ykkönen	4	1	—						4	1
Klubi 04	Total		9	4	0	0	0	0	0	0	9	4
IFK Mariehamn (loan)	2008	Veikkausliiga	4	0	–		–		–		4	0
KuPS (loan)	2013	Veikkausliiga	4	0	0	0	—				4	0
SJK (loan)	2013	Ykkönen	13	6	0	0	—				13	6
SJK	2014	Veikkausliiga	29	11	1	1	4	0	—		34	12
SJK	2015	Veikkausliiga	33	14	0	0	5	6	2	0	40	20
SJK	Total		62	25	1	1	9	6	2	0	74	32
Falkenberg	2016	Allsvenskan	14	0	4	0	—				18	0
HJK	2016	Veikkausliiga	8	3	1	0	—				9	3
HJK	2017	Veikkausliiga	31	14	8	7	—		4	2	43	23
HJK	2018	Veikkausliiga	7	1	8	4	—				15	5
HJK	2019	Veikkausliiga	8	1	5	1	—		1	0	14	2
HJK	Total		54	19	23	12	0	0	5	2	61	33
Klubi-04	2019	Kakkonen	1	0	—						1	0
IFK Mariehamn	2020	Veikkausliiga	20	3	–		–		–		20	3
Career totals			249	87	34	13	30	17	19	2	332	119

=== International ===
Pelvas has played for his country in different national junior teams, most recently the Finland national under-21 football team. He has been one of the most effective strikers for Finland's youth teams, together with Lauri Dalla Valle. He made his senior debut for Finland on 22 January 2012, in a friendly against Trinidad and Tobago.

=== International goals ===
Scores and results list Finland's goal tally first.

No	Date	Venue	Opponent	Score	Result	Competition
1.	11 January 2018	Zayed Sports City Stadium, Abu Dhabi, United Arab Emirates	Jordan	2–0	2–1	Friendly

== Honours ==
Individual

- Veikkausliiga Player of the Month: October 2011, August 2017
