= Toni Lehtinen =

Finnish footballer (born 1984)

Personal information
- Full name: Toni-Pekka Lehtinen
- Date of birth: 5 May 1984 (age 42)
- Place of birth: Helsinki, Finland
- Height: 1.82 m (5 ft 11 1/2 in)
- Position: Striker

Team information
- Current team: SJK (manager)

Youth career
- –2000: TP-Seinäjoki
- 2000–2002: Peterborough

Senior career*
Years	Team	Apps	(Gls)
2002–2003	TP-Seinäjoki	19	(3)
2003–2008	Haka	130	(50)
2009	Levadiakos	9	(0)
2009–2010	Aarau	8	(0)
2010	Haka	6	(1)
2011	IFK Mariehamn	30	(7)
2012−2016	SJK	117	(39)
2015–2017	SJK II	10	(5)
Total		329	(105)

International career
2004–2008	Finland	4	(0)

Managerial career
- 2017: SJK Akatemia (player-coach)
- 2017-2018: SJK (assistant)
- 2018-2019: SJK Akatemia (assistant)
- 2020: SJK U19
- 2021: SJK Akatemia
- 2021: SJK (assistant)
- 2021–2023: JJK
- 2024: SJK
- 2024–: SJK (assistant)
- * Club domestic league appearances and goals

Toni-Pekka Lehtinen (born 5 May 1984) is a Finnish football manager and former player. He is currently an assistant coach of Seinäjoen Jalkapallokerho (SJK). Lehtinen was previously the manager of JJK Jyväskylä.

== Playing career ==
=== Early career ===
Lehtinen has previously played for TP-Seinäjoki and was a youth player at English club Peterborough United. He returned to TP-Seinäjoki in 2002.

=== FC Haka ===
Toni signed for FC Haka in 2003. He won the Veikkausliiga in 2004 and finished runners up in 2007. He finished as the second highest scorer in the Veikkausliiga in 2004, 2007 and 2008 with 11 league goals in each of those seasons. He won the Veikkausliiga Rookie of the Year award in 2004. He won the Finnish Cup in 2005.

=== Levadiakos, FC Aarau ===
He joined the Greek club Levadiakos in the Super League Greece in January 2009, and joined FC Aarau in the Swiss Super League later that year after the Greek season had ended.

=== Return to Finland ===
He returned to FC Haka after the 09/10 season with FC Aarau had finished. Signed for IFK Mariehamn in January 2011.

After only one season with IFK, he left the Mariehamn-based club and signed a five-year contract with SJK in Ykkönen.

== International career ==
Toni made his debut for the Finnish national team against Bahrain in December 2004. He has made 3 appearances for his country.

== Coaching career ==
The last years of his playing career, Lehtinen was in SJK Akatemia squad on a player-coach contract. He worked as an assistant coach and youth coach in SJK organisation, before he was named the head coach of JJK Jyväskylä in August 2021.

On 12 January 2024, Lehtinen returned to Seinäjoki after he was named the manager of SJK first team.

== Career statistics ==
As of 15 May 2024.

Appearances and goals by club, season and competition
Club	Season	League			National cup (Note: Includes Suomen Cup and Iranian Hazfi Cup)		League Cup (Note: Includes Finnish League Cup)		Continental		Total	
Club	Season	Division	Apps	Goals	Apps	Goals	Apps	Goals	Apps	Goals	Apps	Goals
TP-Seinäjoki	2002	Ykkönen	19	3	0	0	–		–			
Haka	2003	Veikkausliiga	7	0	0	0	–		1 (Note: Includes UEFA Cup)	0	8	0
Haka	2004	Veikkausliiga	26	11	0	0	–		3	0	29	11
Haka	2005	Veikkausliiga	23	8	1	0	–		3 (Note: Includes UEFA Champions League)	1	27	9
Haka	2006	Veikkausliiga	23	9	0	0	–		2	0	25	9
Haka	2007	Veikkausliiga	25	11	0	0	–		4	1	29	12
Haka	2008	Veikkausliiga	26	11	2	0	–		4	1	32	12
Haka	Total		130	50	3	0	0	0	17	3	150	53
Levadiakos	2008–09	Super League Greece	9	0	0	0	–		–		9	0
Aarau	2009–10	Swiss Super League	8	0	2	1	–		–		10	1
Aarau II	2009–10	2. Liga Interregional	2	1	–		–		–		2	1
Haka	2010	Veikkausliiga	6	1	–		–		–		6	1
IFK Mariehamn	2011	Veikkausliiga	30	7	2	2	–		–		32	9
SJK	2012	Ykkönen	21	13	1	1	–		–		22	14
SJK	2013	Ykkönen	25	10	–		–		–		25	10
SJK	2014	Veikkausliiga	30	8	0	0	3 (Note: Includes Finnish League Cup)	0	–		33	8
SJK	2015	Veikkausliiga	23	6	1	0	3	0	2 (Note: Includes UEFA Europa League)	0	29	6
SJK	2016	Veikkausliiga	8	1	1	0	0	0	0	0	9	1
SJK	Total		107	41	3	1	6	0	2	0	52	10
SJK II	2015	Kakkonen	1	0	–		–		–		1	0
SJK II	2016	Kolmonen	3	2	–		–		–		3	2
SJK II	2017	Kolmonen	6	3	–		–		–		6	3
SJK II	Total		10	5	–	–	–	–	–	–	10	5
Career total			321	108	10	4	6	0	19	3	356	115

=== International ===
As of match played 21 March 2024

Finland
Year	Apps	Goals
2004	2	0
2005	0	0
2006	0	0
2007	0	0
2008	2	0
Total	4	0

== Honours ==
As a player
Haka

- Veikkausliiga: 2004
- Finnish Cup: 2005

SJK

- Veikkausliiga: 2015
- Finnish Cup: 2016
- Finnish League Cup: 2014

Individual

- Veikkausliiga Manager of the Month: April 2024
