= Pavle Milosavljević =

Serbian footballer

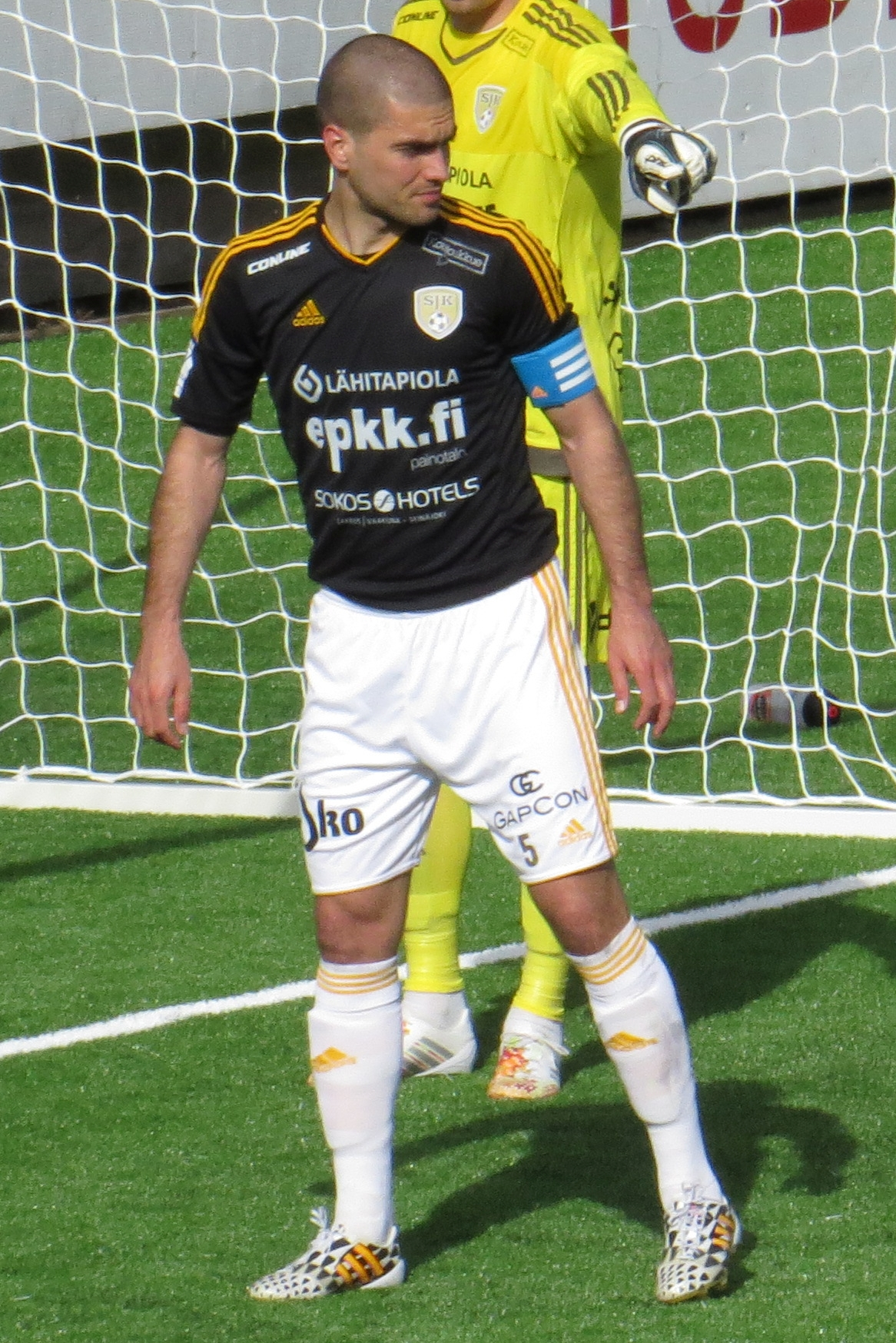
- Pavle Milosavljević

Personal information
- Date of birth: 21 June 1987 (age 39)
- Place of birth: Sremska Mitrovica, Serbia
- Height: 1.86 m (6 ft 1 in)
- Position: Defender

Senior career*
Years	Team	Apps	(Gls)
2010–2012	FK Srem	60	(3)
2013–2015	SJK	64	(1)
2016	Ilves	30	(1)
2017–2019	FF Jaro	62	(1)
2020	JBK	8	(0)
2021	FF Jaro	1	(0)

Managerial career
- 2020: JBK (player-assistant)
- 2021–2022: FF Jaro (assistant)
- * Club domestic league appearances and goals

Pavle Milosavljević (born 21 June 1987) is a Serbian former professional footballer. Milosavljević retired as a player at the end of 2021.
