= Christoffer Kloo =

Finnish footballer (born 1973)

Personal information
- Date of birth: 1 March 1973 (age 53)
- Position: Defender

Senior career*
Years	Team	Apps	(Gls)
1993–1995	VPS	76	(13)
1996–1998	Öster	40	(0)
1999–2002	VPS	60	(2)
2003–2009	Vasa IFK		

Managerial career
- 2009–2010: Vasa IFK
- 2011–2012: SJK
- 2017–2018: SJK (sporting director)
- * Club domestic league appearances and goals

Christoffer Kloo (born 1 March 1973) is a retired Finnish football defender.
