= Jussi Vasara =

Finnish footballer (born 1987)

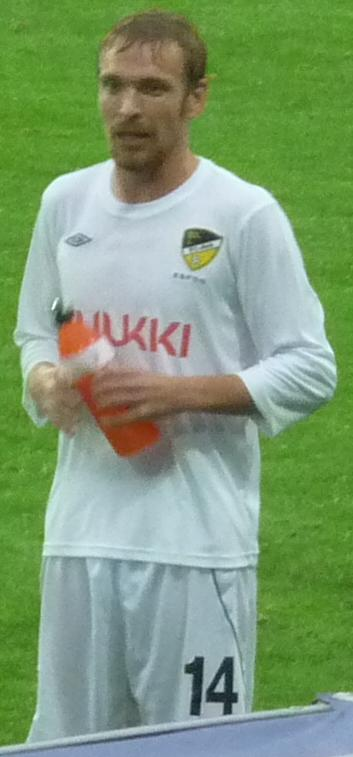

Personal information
- Full name: Jussi Aleksi Vasara
- Date of birth: 14 May 1987 (age 39)
- Place of birth: Helsinki, Finland
- Height: 1.80 m (5 ft 11 in)
- Position: Midfielder

Youth career
- MPS
- HJK

Senior career*
Years	Team	Apps	(Gls)
2006	Klubi 04		
2007–2014	FC Honka	167	(33)
2015–2016	SJK	59	(11)

International career
- Finland U-15
- Finland U-16
- Finland U-17
- Finland U-19
- Finland U-20
2008–2009	Finland U-21	6	(2)
Medal record
Honka
Runner-up	Finnish Cup	2007
Runner-up	Finnish Cup	2008
Runner-up	Veikkausliiga	2008
Runner-up	Veikkausliiga	2009
Winner	Finnish League Cup	2010
Winner	Finnish League Cup	2011
Winner	Finnish Cup	2012
- * Club domestic league appearances and goals

Jussi Aleksi Vasara (born 14 May 1987) is a retired Finnish footballer who most recently played for Finnish Veikkausliiga club Seinäjoen Jalkapallokerho.

== International career ==
Vasara represented Finland U21 in the Under 21 European Championships in 2009. He made two crucial goals as a substitute in his U-21 debut match against Austria in the qualifying play-off second leg to take the tie into extra time. Vasara was chosen to the Veikkausliiga team of the Month for September 2014. In January 2015 he signed two-year deal with Seinäjoen Jalkapallokerho.

== Personal ==
He is the younger brother of former Finland international player Vesa Vasara.
