= 2012 Ykkönen =

Ykkönen
- Season: 2012
- Champions: RoPS
- Promoted: RoPS
- Relegated: FC Hämeenlinna; HIFK
- Matches played: 135
- Goals scored: 367 (2.72 per match)
- Top goalscorer: Aleksandr Kokko (15 goals)
- Biggest home win: PK-35 Vantaa 9–0 FC Hämeenlinna (28 April)
- Biggest away win: FC Viikingit 0–4 PK-35 Vantaa (7 May); PK-35 Vantaa 0–4 FC Viikingit (25 June); HIFK 0–4 SJK (26 June); FC KooTeePee 0–4 FC Viikingit (7 July); FC Viikingit 0–4 PK-35 Vantaa (18 August)
- Highest scoring: PK-35 Vantaa 9–0 FC Hämeenlinna (28 April)

The Ykkönen 2012 season began on 27 April 2012 and ended on 6 October 2012.

The champions will be directly promoted to the 2013 Veikkausliiga. The two teams finishing at the bottom of the table will be directly relegated to Kakkonen.

== Overview ==
Location of teams in Ykkönen 2011

A total of ten teams will contest in the league, including eight sides from the 2011 season, RoPS who was relegated from Veikkausliiga and SJK who promoted from Kakkonen after winning the promotion play-offs.

Club	Location	Stadium	Capacity	Manager
AC Oulu	Oulu	Raatin Stadion	6,996	(Finland) Rauno Ojanen
FC Hämeenlinna	Hämeenlinna	Kaurialan kenttä	8,000	(Finland) Jussi Lempinen
FC KooTeePee	Kotka	Arto Tolsa Areena	4,780	(Finland) Janne Hyppönen
FC Viikingit	Helsinki	Vuosaaren urheilukenttä	4,200	(Finland) Ilkka Jäntti
HIFK	Helsinki	Brahen kenttä	2,000	(Finland) Juha Moilanen
JIPPO	Joensuu	Joensuun keskuskenttä	2,000	(Finland) Jarmo Korhonen
OPS	Oulu	Raatin Stadion	6,996	(Brazil) Luiz Antonio
PK-35 Vantaa	Vantaa	ISS Stadion	4,500	(Finland) Pasi Pihamaa
RoPS	Rovaniemi	Rovaniemen keskuskenttä	4,000	(Finland) Kari Virtanen
SJK	Seinäjoki	Seinäjoen keskuskenttä	3,500	(Finland) Simo Valakari

=== Managerial changes ===
Team	Outgoing manager	Manner of departure	Date of vacancy	Incoming manager	Date of appointment	Table
RoPS	(Finland) Matti Hiukka	End of contract	n/a	(Finland) Kari Virtanen	4 November 2011	Pre-season
HIFK	(Finland) Jani Honkavaara	Resigned	19 October 2011	(Finland) Juha Moilanen	10 January 2012	Pre-season
SJK	(Finland) Christoffer Kloo	Sacked	13 August 2012	(England) Jamie Shore (as caretaker)	13 August 2012	4th
SJK	(England) Jamie Shore	Caretaker	1 September 2012	(Finland) Simo Valakari	1 September 2012	2nd
AC Oulu	(Finland) Juha Malinen	Loaned by Haka	10 September 2012	(Finland) Rauno Ojanen	10 September 2012	5th

== League table ==
Pos	Team	Pld	W	D	L	GF	GA	GD	Pts	Promotion or relegation
1	RoPS (C, P)	27	18	5	4	53	20	+33	59	Promotion to Veikkausliiga
2	SJK	27	14	5	8	42	29	+13	47	
3	FC Viikingit	27	14	3	10	36	36	0	45	
4	PK-35 Vantaa	27	13	4	10	54	31	+23	43	
5	OPS	27	10	8	9	34	35	−1	38	
6	AC Oulu	27	9	10	8	38	35	+3	37	
7	FC KooTeePee	27	10	5	12	30	33	−3	35	
8	JIPPO	27	7	7	13	31	44	−13	28	
9	FC Hämeenlinna (R)	27	5	7	15	18	48	−30	22	Relegation to Kakkonen
10	HIFK (R)	27	5	6	16	29	54	−25	21	Relegation to Kakkonen

Source: palloverkko.palloliitto.fi
Rules for classification: 1) points; 2) goal difference; 3) number of goals scored.
(C) Champions; (P) Promoted; (R) Relegated

== Results ==
=== Matches 1–18 ===
Home \ Away	ACO	HÄM	KTP	VII	HIFK	JIP	OPS	PKV	RPS	SJK
AC Oulu		0–0	4–1	0–3 (Note: The match originally finished 5–0, but AC Oulu fielded an ineligible player.)	3–1	1–1	2–2	2–1	0–0	3–1
FC Hämeenlinna	1–0		1–1	3–0	1–3	1–1	0–0	1–2	0–2	0–2
FC KooTeePee	0–1	0–0		0–4	0–2	3–0 (Note: The match originally finished 1–2, but JIPPO fielded an ineligible player.)	1–1	1–0	0–3	0–1
FC Viikingit	1–1	2–1	1–0		2–1	1–0	3–0	0–4	1–3	0–2
HIFK	2–2	0–2	0–3	1–1		0–0	1–1	0–0	1–4	0–4
JIPPO	2–3	3–1	1–0	0–1	1–0		3–1	3–1	1–1	1–1
OPS	1–1	4–0	0–3	1–2	1–1	2–1		1–0	0–1	1–1
PK-35 Vantaa	2–0	9–0	2–1	0–4	5–1	5–1	3–0		0–0	2–0
RoPS	1–0	3–0	3–1	2–0	3–1	4–0	3–0	1–1		2–0
SJK	2–2	1–1	0–0	3–1	3–1	3–1	0–2	2–1	1–3	

Source: palloverkko.palloliitto.fi
Legend: Blue = home team win; Yellow = draw; Red = away team win.

=== Matches 19–27 ===
Home \ Away	ACO	HÄM	KTP	VII	HIFK	JIP	OPS	PKV	RPS	SJK
AC Oulu			2–2	3–3		2–0	1–0			0–2
FC Hämeenlinna	1–3				1–0				0–2	0–2
FC KooTeePee		3–0				1–0	0–1			1–0
FC Viikingit		0–2	0–3		2–1			0–4		0–1
HIFK	1–0		1–2				3–4	2–1		
JIPPO		0–0		0–2	5–2					2–0
OPS		2–1		0–1		3–0		1–1	2–0	
PK-35 Vantaa	1–0	3–0	2–3			4–3			0–1	
RoPS	3–2		3–0	0–1	2–3	1–1				
SJK					1–0		2–3	3–0	4–2	

Source: palloverkko.palloliitto.fi
Legend: Blue = home team win; Yellow = draw; Red = away team win.

== Statistics ==
Updated to games played on 6 October 2012.

=== Top scorers ===
Source: palloverkko.palloliitto.fi

Rank	Player	Club	Goals
1	(Finland) Aleksandr Kokko	RoPS	15
2	(Finland) Toni Lehtinen	SJK	12
3	(Finland) Mika Lahtinen	RoPS	11
3	(Cameroon) Ariel Ngueukam	JIPPO	11

== See also ==
- 2012 Veikkausliiga
- 2012 Finnish League Cup
- 2012 Suomen Cup
- 2012 Kakkonen
