= Seinäjoen Jalkapallokerho =

Finnish football club

SJK Seinäjoki
- Full name: Seinäjoen Jalkapallokerho
- Nickname: Kerho (The Club)
- Founded: 5 November 2007; 19 years ago
- Ground: OmaSP Stadion, Seinäjoki, Finland
- Capacity: 5,817
- Chairman: Raimo Sarajärvi
- Manager: Jarkko Wiss
- League: Veikkausliiga
- 2026: Veikkausliiga, 10th of 12
- Website: www.sjk.fi
Home colours	Away colours	Third colours

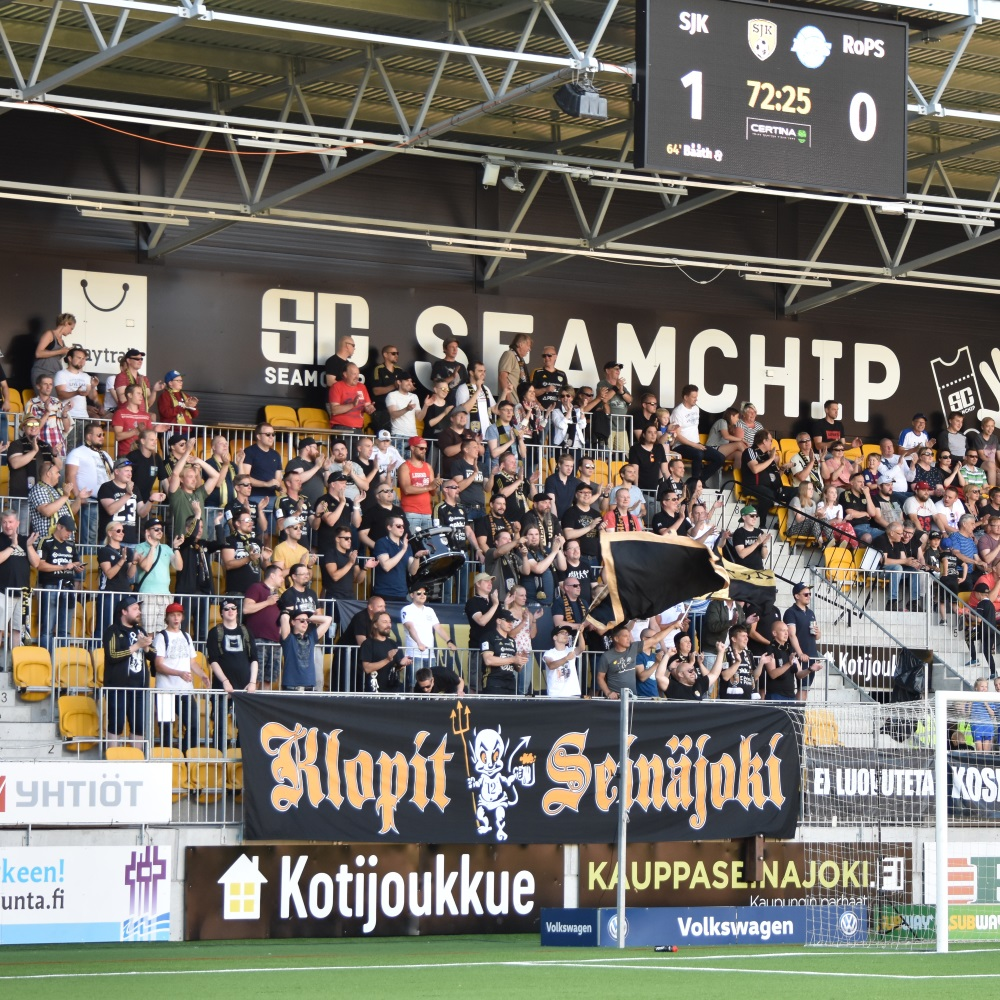
SJK supporters.

Seinäjoen Jalkapallokerho, commonly referred to as SJK, also internationally SJK Seinäjoki, is a Finnish professional football club from the city of Seinäjoki. The club plays in the Veikkausliiga, the highest tier of the Finnish league system. Their home ground is OmaSP Stadion, which is located near the city center and next to SJK's training facility Wallsport. SJK was formed in 2007 after the merger of TP-Seinäjoki and Sepsi-78. After starting in the third-tier, the club won the promotion to Veikkausliiga in 2014, and the next year won its first Finnish championship title.

== History ==
=== The early years ===
SJK was formed on 5 November 2007 as a merger between the first teams of TP-Seinäjoki and Sepsi-78. It was told to the public five days later. Sepsi-78 had a board meeting on 24 October and TP-Seinäjoki on the next day. Both clubs supported the merger. Sepsi-78 and TP both gave up their place in Kakkonen. The first signing of the new club was Petri Huttu. There were several negotiations about the merger over the years. The main reason was the inadequacy of players. The clubs continued doing junior work after the merger, but could also have their own team in the lower divisions. The work name of the club was Seinäjoki Futis, and there was a contest about the official name, where everyone could suggest a name. The final name was Seinäjoen Jalkapallokerho, that had been suggested by many people. There was also a contest about the logo and uniform. The registered name of the club is Seinäjoen Jalkapallokerho ry, and it was registered on January 22, 2008. Mikko Latomäki was chosen as the first chairman. Jukka Saarijärvi was chosen as the vice chairman. Saarijärvi was a former TP-Seinäjoki chairman.

=== Promotion to Veikkausliiga ===
==== 2012–2016: Simo Valakari era ====
In 2013 SJK started its second season in Ykkönen. In 2012 SJK had been placed second. SJK made some signings for 2013, which included a Spanish La Masia graduate Josu and Estonian Mihkel Aksalu. SJK started the season on May 4 with a 2–1 win over PK-35 Vantaa. SJK played AC Kajaani on June 30 and won 1–7. Kajaani made a complaint to Palloliitto about the amount of foreigners in SJK. The complaint went through and AC Kajaani was changed as the winner of the match. SJK complained about the decision and the result was again changed. AC Kajaani complained again, but later canceled it. After that SJK lost five matches in a row. SJK however did win eight matches in a row after that. The promotion to Veikkausliiga was confirmed on 29 September 2013 in a homematch against FC Haka. There was a record breaking attendance (4 798). The match was a 1–1 draw.

SJK started the season 2014 with winning the League Cup. SJK won the final 2–0 against local rivals Vaasan Palloseura. The season started poorly, at the end of May the club was at the eleventh place. After that SJK won seven games in a row and those results lifted SJK to the second place. HJK won the league and SJK was second. SJK was the only club to win against HJK under Mika Lehkosuo. SJK lost only two of the last 24 games. The most important players were Mihkel Aksalu, the league's best defender Cedric Gogoua, Johannes Laaksonen and Toni Lehtinen.

For the 2015 season SJK got even stronger. There were new signings like Mehmet Hetemaj and Ariel Ngueukam. SJK was considered as the biggest challenger of HJK. SJK was at the top of the table in September. SJK won HJK 3–0 in Seinäjoki. At the end of the season SJK's biggest challenger was Rovaniemen Palloseura. SJK won the league with one point difference to RoPS. The most important players were Roope Riski and Liverpool FC loanee Allan. SJK was chosen as the team of the year in Finland's sports gala.

SJK won the Finnish Cup in 2016. It was the first time in the club's history.

==== 2017–present ====
SJK's head coach Simo Valakari was surprisingly sacked on February 17, 2017. He was replaced by Sixten Boström. Sixten Boström got also sacked after poor results in May and was replaced by Spanish José Manuel Roca Roca was sacked in September. SJK Akatemia coaches Brian Page and Toni Lehtinen did the job for the rest of the poor season. Under Page and Lehtinen SJK lost the Finnish Cup final to HJK. Tommi Kautonen was hired as the new head coach in October 2017. The season 2018 didn't start as planned and Kautonen was sacked. He was replaced by Aleksei Borisovich Yeryomenko. Yeryomenko could save SJK from relegation. Yeryomenko continued as the head coach in 2019. SJK signed for example Sergei Eremenko and Moshtagh Yaghoubi. SJK didn't win a single game in the group stage of the Finnish Cup in the winter. The Veikkausliiga-campaign started well, because SJK won in the first round for the first time ever. SJK won KPV in the end of April and was at the first place of the league. Despite the good start, SJK couldn't get good results. Yeryomenko was sacked in August. The replacement was Brian Page. SJK didn't win any games for the rest of the season. SJK placed ninth.

After the season SJK appointed Jani Honkavaara as the new head coach. Honkavaara signed many prolific players for the 2020 season, such as Ariel Ngueukam, Robin Sid, Tero Mäntylä and Niko Markkula. In the winter, SJK once again could not get through from the group stage of the Finnish Cup. As the Veikkausliiga season started in July, SJK won in the first round against TPS. SJK had a good start to the season, but the results started to get worse quite quickly. In the summer transfer window the club signed a couple of players, such as Jake Jervis and Emmanuel Ledesma. They proved themselves quickly and with their lead SJK could end the season somewhat brightly. SJK finished seventh, which was disappointing for the club and the supporters. In the 2021 season, Honkavaara led SJK to finish 3rd in the league and win bronze medals.

During the 2022 and 2023 seasons, the first team was managed by Joaquín Gómez. In August 2022, club's academy product Daniel Håkans was loaned out to FK Jerv in Norwegian top-tier, and later acquired by Jerv on a permanent contract.

On 6 March 2023, SJK officially announced a co-operation deal with Ghanaian football academy Vision FC, presented by the sporting director Richie Dorman. SJK and Vision had already worked together for a while before the announcement. After the 2023 season, Terry Yegbe, who had arrived to SJK from Vision, was acquired by IF Elfsborg for a reported transfer fee of €600.000–700.000.

For the 2024 Veikkausliiga season, the reserve team head coach Stevie Grieve was appointed the manager of the first team. However, due to his lack of required UEFA Pro-license, he worked first as an assistant coach to Toni Lehtinen. On 29 May 2024, he was named the manager officially, after he was earlier accepted to UEFA Pro-class.

== Statistics ==
=== Domestic history ===
Season	Tier	Pos	Pld	W	D	L	For	Against	Points	Finnish Cup	League Cup	Top goalscorer (League)	Top goalscorer (All competitions)
2008	3	8	26	10	7	9	57	37	37		–	(Finland) Tommi Haanpää – 10	-
2009	3	5	26	14	1	11	56	52	43	Third round	–	(Finland) Mikael Muurimäki – 14	-
2010	3	5	26	11	9	6	46	31	42	Fifth Round	–	(Finland) Mikael Muurimäki – 9	-
2011	3	1	26	22	4	0	72	14	70	Seventh Round	–	(Finland) Petter Meyer – 23	-
2012	2	2	27	14	5	8	42	29	47	Fifth Round	–	(Finland) Toni Lehtinen – 13	(Finland) Toni Lehtinen - 14
2013	2	1	27	18	5	4	51	17	59	Third round	–	(Finland) Toni Lehtinen – 10	(Finland) Toni Lehtinen – 10
2014	1	2	33	16	11	6	40	26	59	Quarter-final	Winners	(Finland) Akseli Pelvas – 11	(Finland) Akseli Pelvas – 12
2015	1	1	33	18	6	9	50	22	60	Fifth Round	Quarter-final	(Finland) Akseli Pelvas – 14	(Finland) Akseli Pelvas – 20
2016	1	3	33	17	6	10	49	36	57	Winners	Runners-up	(Finland) Roope Riski – 17	(Finland) Roope Riski – 25
2017	1	6	33	13	8	12	42	47	47	Runners-up	–	(England) Billy Ions – 12	(England) Billy Ions – 14
2018	1	9	33	8	8	17	28	37	32	Quarter-final	–	(Finland) Johannes Laaksonen – 6	(Finland) Johannes Laaksonen, (Democratic Republic of the Congo) Aristote M'Boma – 6
2019	1	9	27	7	9	11	18	29	30	Group-stage	-	(Ukraine) Denys Oliynyk - 8	(Ukraine) Denys Oliynyk - 10
2020	1	7	22	8	5	9	27	29	29	Group-stage	-	(Argentina) Emmanuel Ledesma - 5	(Finland) Joonas Lepistö - 6
2021	1	3	27	14	6	7	45	34	48	Quarter-final	-	(Cameroon) Ariel Ngueukam –14	(Cameroon) Ariel Ngueukam – 14
2022	1	6	27	10	5	12	33	38	35	Quarter-final	Semi-final	(England) Jake Jervis –6	(England) Jake Jervis – 10
2023	1	4	27	12	6	9	35	33	42	Fourth round	Group-stage	(Nicaragua) Jaime Moreno –11	(Nicaragua) Jaime Moreno – 12
2024	1	4	27	11	7	9	46	44	40	Semi-final	Group-stage	(Nicaragua) Jaime Moreno -12	(Nicaragua) Jaime Moreno - 22
2025	1	4	32	17	8	7	70	51	59	Quarter-final	Group-stage	(Finland) Kasper Paananen -18	(Finland) Kasper Paananen - 19

=== European history ===
Accurate as of 17 July 2025

Competition	Played	Won	Drew	Lost	GF	GA	GD	Win%
UEFA Champions League	2	0	1	1	2	4	−2	0.00
UEFA Europa League	4	0	1	3	0	4	−4	0.00
UEFA Europa Conference League	4	1	0	3	6	9	−3	25.00

Legend: GF = Goals For. GA = Goals Against. GD = Goal Difference.

Season	Competition	Round	Opponent	Home	Away	Aggregate
2015–16	UEFA Europa League	1Q	(Iceland) FH	0–1	0–1	0–2
2016–17	UEFA Champions League	2Q	(Belarus) BATE Borisov	2–2	0–2	2–4
2017–18	UEFA Europa League	1Q	(Iceland) KR Reykjavík	0–2	0–0	0–2
2022–23	UEFA Europa Conference League	1Q	(Estonia) Flora	4–2 (a.e.t.)	0–1	4–3
2022–23	UEFA Europa Conference League	2Q	(Norway) Lillestrøm	0–1	2–5	2–6
2025–26	UEFA Conference League	1Q	(Faroe Islands) KÍ Klaksvík	1–2	0–2	1–4

Notes

- 1Q: First qualifying round
- 2Q: Second qualifying round

== Stadium and sponsors ==
=== Stadium ===
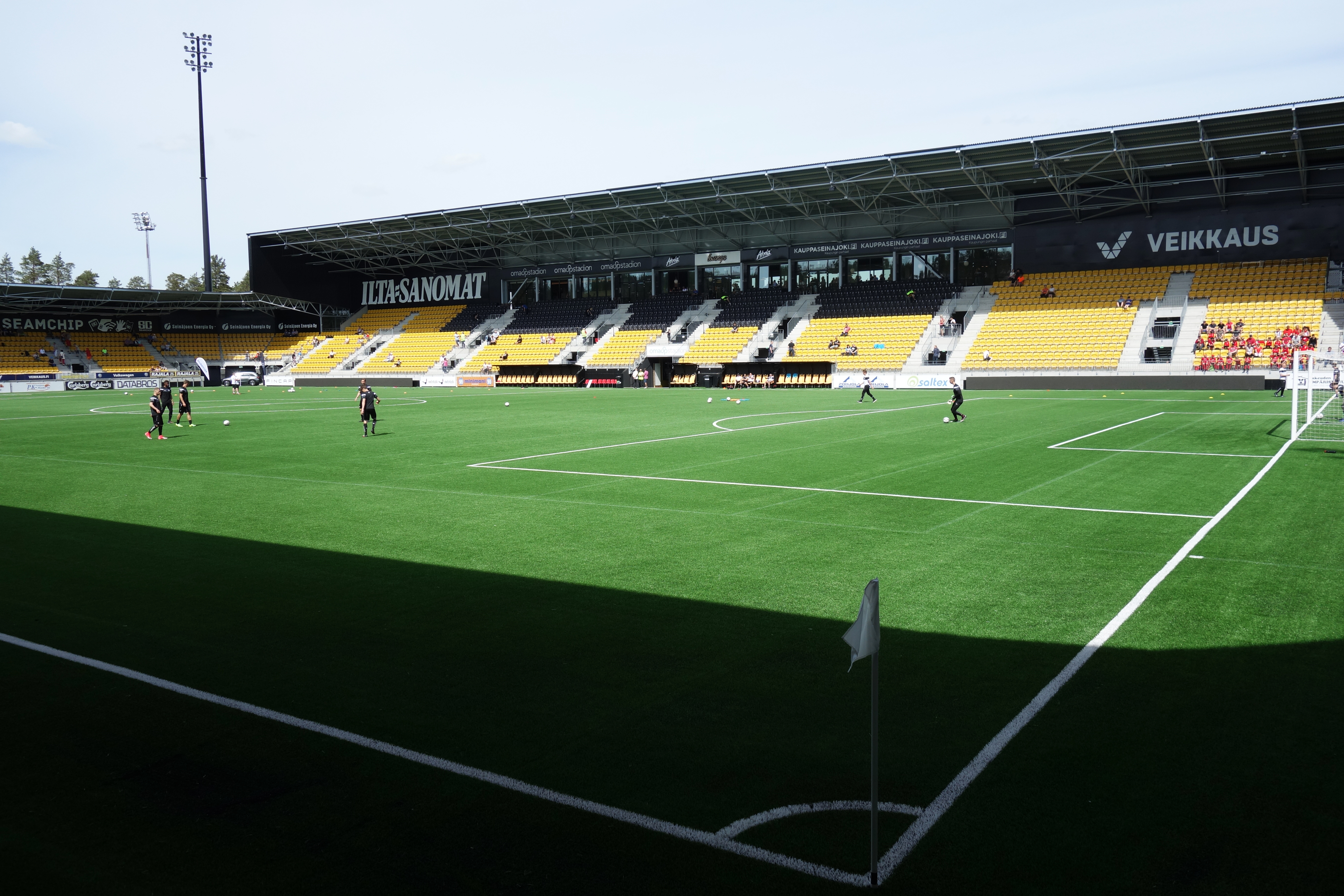
OmaSP Stadion

SJK play their home matches at OmaSP Stadion. Previously SJK played their home matches at Seinäjoen keskuskenttä.

In 2010, it was reported for the first time that SJK were planning a new football stadium. Eventually, in autumn 2014 it was announced that the construction of SJK's new stadium would start soon. The construction began in summer 2015 and the new stadium was completed in June 2016. Stadium has a capacity of 5817 seats.

SJK play their friendlies and cup matches during the winter at Wallsport Areena which is an indoor training facility owned and operated by the team.

=== Kit suppliers and shirt sponsors ===
As of 26 March 2025

Period	Kit manufacturer	Shirt sponsors	Ref
2008–2009	(England) Umbro	Nordea, S-Market	
2010–2011	(Germany) Adidas	Nordea, Carlsberg, Eepee	
2012	(Germany) Adidas	Kotijoukkue, Prisma	
2013	(Germany) Adidas	Kotijoukkue, LähiTapiola, ABC, Sokos Hotels	
2014	(Germany) Adidas	Conline, Ilkka, LähiTapiola, GapCon, Sokos Hotels	
2015	(Germany) Adidas	Conline, Kotijoukkue, LähiTapiola, EPPK, ABC, Sokos Hotels	
2016	(Germany) Adidas	Conline, Kotijoukkue, LähiTapiola, EPPK, Prima Power	
2017	(Germany) Adidas	FinCap, I-Print, OmaSp, LähiTapiola, Prima Power, Elisa	
2018	(Germany) Adidas	Visura, ProPrint, Peab, LähiTapiola, OmaSp, Elisa	
2019	(Germany) Adidas	Atria, ProPrint, Peab, LähiTapiola, OmaSp, Elisa	
2020	(Germany) Adidas	Atria, ProPrint, LähiTapiola, OmaSp, Elisa	
2021	(Germany) Adidas	Atria, ProPrint, Ilkka-Pohjalainen, LähiTapiola, OmaSp, Elisa	
2022-2023	(Germany) Adidas	Ilkka-Pohjalainen, ProPrint, Lecklé, LähiTapiola, OmaSp, Pihlajalinna	
2024	(Germany) Adidas	Seinäjoki, ProPrint, Lecklé, LähiTapiola, OmaSp, Pihlajalinna	
2025	(Germany) Adidas	LähiTapiola, OmaSp, ProPrint, Pihlajalinna	

== Honours ==
- Veikkausliiga
  - Winners (1): 2015
  - Runners-up (1): 2014
  - 3rd place (2): 2016, 2021
- Finnish Cup
  - Winners (1): 2016
  - Runners-up (1): 2017
- Finnish League Cup
  - Winners (1): 2014
  - Runners-up (1): 2016

== Transfers ==
SJK have invested in their academy system, and has produced a fair amount of young Finnish and international players for Veikkausliiga and for transfers abroad.

=== Record transfers ===
Rank	Player	To	Fee	Year
1.	(Ghana) Terry Yegbe	(Sweden) Elfsborg	€950,000	2024
2.	(Ivory Coast) Cedric Gogoua	(Serbia) Partizan	€300,000	2016
3.	(Finland) Daniel Håkans	(Norway) Jerv	€210,000	2023
4.	(Finland) Dario Naamo	(Austria) St. Pölten	€200,000	2024
5.	(Malaysia) Nooa Laine	(Malaysia) Selangor	€160,000	2024

== Players ==
=== First team squad ===
As of 27 August 2026

Note: Flags indicate national team as defined under FIFA eligibility rules; some limited exceptions apply. Players may hold more than one non-FIFA nationality.

No.	Pos.	Nation	Player
1	GK	FIN	Roope Paunio (Captain)
2	DF	ARG	Facundo Costantini
4	DF	CPV	Kelvin Pires
5	DF	FIN	Oskari Väistö (3rd captain)
6	MF	GHA	Salim Yussif
7	FW	BRA	Kelwin Sousa
8	MF	FIN	Aapo Boström
9	FW	FIN	Jeremiah Streng
11	FW	FIN	Albin Björkskog
14	DF	BRA	Murilo
15	DF	FIN	Eetu Mömmö (4th captain)
17	MF	FIN	Vertti Hänninen
19	FW	FIN	Elias Mastokangas (vice-captain)
21	FW	FIN	Danila Bulgakov

No.	Pos.	Nation	Player
22	MF	FIN	Leon Vesterbacka
23	MF	CAN	Armaan Wilson
26	DF	FIN	Jaakko Moisio
27	FW	GRE	Apostolos Vellios
28	DF	SWE	Karlson Nwanege (on loan from Verona)
30	MF	ZIM	Prosper Padera
31	MF	FIN	Eze Onuoha
33	MF	FIN	Aniis Machaal
35	GK	FIN	Johannes Viitala
42	MF	BRA	Caio
48	MF	CIV	Amidou Traoré
49	DF	NGR	Ekerette Udom
51	FW	CIV	Aziz Cissé
60	GK	NGR	Samuel James

=== Out on loan ===
Note: Flags indicate national team as defined under FIFA eligibility rules; some limited exceptions apply. Players may hold more than one non-FIFA nationality.

No.	Pos.	Nation	Player
10	FW	FIN	Kasper Paananen (at Kalmar FF until 30 June 2027)
70	FW	HON	Alenis Vargas (at Manisa FK until 30 June 2027)

== SJK Akatemia ==
=== Reserve team squad ===
As of 16 March 2026

Note: Flags indicate national team as defined under FIFA eligibility rules; some limited exceptions apply. Players may hold more than one non-FIFA nationality.

No.	Pos.	Nation	Player
2	DF	FIN	Topi Mustonen
3	DF	FIN	Oskari Raiski
5	DF	FIN	Eero Lehto
6	DF	GHA	Sayibu Yakubu
7	FW	FIN	Elari Hautamäki
11	MF	FIN	Noah Rantasalmi
14	FW	SSD	Ngong Madut
15	FW	FIN	Elias Hyytinen
17	FW	FIN	Sander Korsunov
18	MF	FIN	Leon Vesterbacka
19	DF	FIN	Ronal Malik
21	DF	FIN	Lucas Kyllönen
22	FW	FIN	Taavi Kangaskokko
25	GK	FIN	Niki Hasselman
26	DF	FIN	Adam Zahedi
27	MF	FIN	Jore Nikkilä
28	FW	FIN	Abdu Muchipay
29	MF	FIN	Noah Rantasalmi
33	DF	FIN	Adrian Hernandez

No.	Pos.	Nation	Player
35	DF	FIN	Ronal Malik
36	DF	FIN	Iiro Kangasniemi
38	FW	FIN	Aatu Piiroinen
40	DF	FIN	Lassi Harju
41	DF	FIN	Ilmari Moilanen
46	MF	FIN	Oliver Eteläaho
47	MF	FIN	Elias Liettyä
48	FW	FIN	Lassi Rintamäki
50	FW	FIN	Hermanni Honkola
54	MF	FIN	Luka Kuusisto
60	GK	NGR	Samuel James
—	DF	FIN	Topias Töllinen
—	DF	FIN	Eerik Salmivuori
—	MF	FIN	Aatu Hakala

=== Out on loan ===
Note: Flags indicate national team as defined under FIFA eligibility rules; some limited exceptions apply. Players may hold more than one non-FIFA nationality.

No.	Pos.	Nation	Player

== Management and boardroom ==
=== Management ===
As of 27 August 2026

Name	Role
(Finland) Jarkko Wiss	Head coach
(Finland) Toni Lehtinen	Assistant coach
(India) Sacha Navalkar	Video Analyst
(Brazil) Luís Fernando	Goalkeeping coach
(Finland) Mikko Kujala	Fitness coach
(Finland) Tiitus Lehtinen	Physiotherapist
(Finland) Pekka Lehtinen	Team Manager
(Finland) Ranno Kukk	Doctor
(Brazil) Adriel Gabilan	Technical Director
(Finland) Arttu Aromaa	Head of Academy
(Portugal) Paulo Lopes	SJK Akatemia Head coach
(Ukraine) Denys Oliynyk	SJK Akatemia/2 Head coach

=== Boardroom ===
As of 18 June 2025

Name	Role
(Finland) Raimo Sarajärvi	Chairman
(Brazil) Adriel Gabilan	Technical director
(Finland) Elina Paavola	Finance Manager
(Finland) Joonas Kuivalainen	Sales Manager
(Finland) Joonas Kuivalainen	Sales Negotiator
(Finland) Tommi Kilpiö	Marketing

== Records and notable stats ==
=== Club Records ===
- Biggest home win: SJK 8–1 TUS (30 May 2008), SJK 7-0 KPV (11 June 2025)
- Biggest away win: RoPo 0-8 SJK (15 April 2024)
- Biggest home loss: SJK 0–6 HJK (10 August 2017)
- Biggest away loss: HJK 6–0 SJK (31 May 2017)
- Most consecutive matches without lost: 44 (18 August 2010 – 30 May 2012)
- Most consecutive wins: 9 (11 July 2011 – 27 August 2011)
- Most consecutive losses: 5 (8 April 2022 – 7 May 2022)

=== Individual Records ===
- Most appearances: (Estonia) Mihkel Aksalu (221)
- Most goals: (Finland) Toni Lehtinen (39)
- Most league appearances: (Estonia) Mihkel Aksalu (158)
- Most league goals: (Finland) Kasper Paananen (30)
- Most cup appearances: (Finland) Mehmet Hetemaj (33)
- Most cup goals: (Finland) Jeremiah Streng (8)
- Most European competition appearances: (Finland) Mehmet Hetemaj (10)
- Most European competition goals: (England) Jake Jervis (3)
- Most capped Finnish player: (Finland) Alexei Eremenko - 61 caps
- Most capped foreign player: (Andorra) Marc Vales – 103 caps

=== Most appearances ===
As of 16 March 2025

#	Name	Matches	Goals
1	(Estonia) Mihkel Aksalu	221	0
2	(Finland) Mehmet Hetemaj	207	22
3	(Finland) Johannes Laaksonen	200	18
4	(Wales) Richie Dorman	168	7
5	(Finland) Ville Tikkanen	159	4
6	(Finland) Jeremiah Streng	136	35
7	(Cameroon) Ariel Ngueukam	133	36
8	(Finland) Matej Hradecky	131	9
9	(Finland) Timo Tahvanainen	128	4
10	(Finland) Pyry Hannola	127	8

=== Club captains ===
Name	Nat	Period
Juha-Pekka Salminen	(Finland)	2008
Petri Niemi	(Finland)	2009
Ville Ylinen	(Finland)	2010
Chris Cleaver	(England)	2011–2013
Pavle Milosavljević	(Serbia)	2014–2015
Mihkel Aksalu	(Estonia)	2016–2018
Mehmet Hetemaj	(Finland)	2019–2022
Matej Hradecky	(Finland)	2023
Ville Tikkanen	(Finland)	2024
Rasmus Karjalainen	(Finland)	2025
Markus Arsalo	(Finland)	2026
Roope Paunio	(Finland)	2026-

=== Supporters player of the year ===
Name	Nat	Period
Jani Asuintupa	(Finland)	2008
Ville Pajula	(Finland)	2009
Ville Pajula	(Finland)	2010
Aki Sipilä	(Finland)	2011
Patrik Lomski	(Finland)	2012
Pavle Milosavljević	(Serbia)	2013
Cedric Gogoua	(Ivory Coast)	2014
Mihkel Aksalu	(Estonia)	2015
Roope Riski	(Finland)	2016
Mehmet Hetemaj	(Finland)	2017
Johannes Laaksonen	(Finland)	2018
Denys Oliynyk	(Ukraine)	2019
Emmanuel Ledesma	(Argentina)	2020
Ville Tikkanen	(Finland)	2021
Jake Jervis	(England)	2022
Ville Tikkanen	(Finland)	2023
Rasmus Karjalainen	(Finland)	2024
Kasper Paananen	(Finland)	2025

=== SJK All Stars ===
In April 2020, SJK fans participated in a fan vote selecting their 11 favourite SJK players from the 2014-2019-seasons.

The SJK 2014–2019 All Stars.

Name	Pos	Nat	Years	Games	Goals	League games	League goals
Mihkel Aksalu	GK	(Estonia)	2013–2019	221	0	158	0
Richie Dorman	RB	(Wales)	2012–2018	168	7	95	4
Pavle Milosavljević	CB	(Serbia)	2013–2015	77	1	38	1
Cedric Gogoua	CB	(Ivory Coast)	2014–2015	59	3	52	3
Timo Tahvanainen	LB	(Finland)	2013–2017	128	4	79	2
Johannes Laaksonen	CM	(Finland)	2013–2018	200	18	141	14
Mehmet Hetemaj	CM	(Finland)	2015–	200	22	142	14
Denys Oliynyk	CM	(Ukraine)	2018–2022	116	29	94	23
Ariel Ngueukam	RW	(Cameroon)	2015–2016; 2020–2021	133	36	108	28
Roope Riski	CF	(Finland)	2015–2016	58	34	46	25
Billy Ions	LW	(England)	2016–2020	74	19	64	17

== Managers ==
Name	Period
(Republic of Ireland) Tommy Dunne	2008
(Finland) Jari Kujala	2008
(Finland) Esa Haanpää	2009
(Finland) Tomi Kärkkäinen	2010
(Finland) Christoffer Kloo	1 Jan 2011 – 13 Aug 2012
(Finland) Simo Valakari	1 Sep 2012 – 17 Feb 2017
(Finland) Sixten Boström	20 Feb 2017 – 2 Jun 2017
(Spain) José Manuel Roca Cases	3 Jun 2017 – 9 Sep 2017
(Scotland) Brian Page & (Finland) Toni Lehtinen (interim)	9 Sep 2017 – 28 Oct 2017
(Finland) Tommi Kautonen	28 Oct 2017 – 22 May 2018
(Russia) Aleksei Borisovich Yeryomenko	22 May 2018 – 16 Aug 2019
(Scotland) Brian Page (interim)	16 Aug 2019 – 23 Oct 2019
(Finland) Jani Honkavaara	23 Oct 2019 – 8 Nov 2021
(Spain) Joaquín Gómez	8 Nov 2021 – 31 Dec 2023
(Finland) Toni Lehtinen (interim)	1 Jan 2024 - 28 May 2024
(Scotland) Stevie Grieve	28 May 2024 - 30 November 2025
(Finland) Jarkko Wiss	1 January 2026 -
