= Seinäjoen keskuskenttä =

Finnish sports stadium

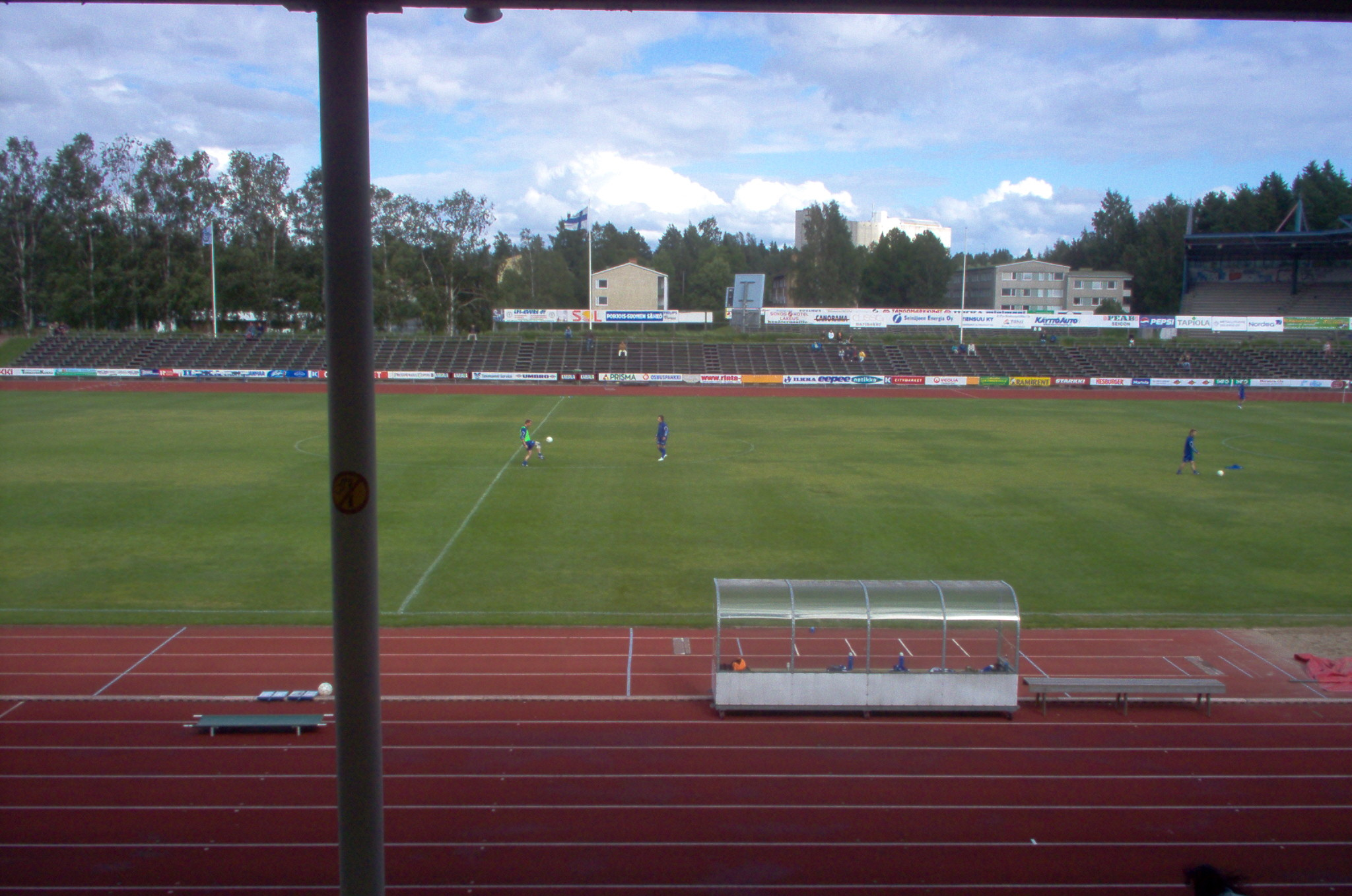
- Interactive map of Seinäjoen keskuskenttä
- Location: Seinäjoki, Finland
- Coordinates: 62°46′55″N 22°51′04″E
- Owner: City of Seinäjoki
- Capacity: 4,500

Construction
- Opened: 1952
- Renovated: 1975

Tenants
- SJK (2007-2016); Kerho 07 (2012-present)

Seinäjoen keskuskenttä is an athletics and football stadium in Seinäjoki, Finland. It is the home stadium of SJK's reserve team Kerho 07 of Kakkonen and it holds 4,500 spectators. It also previously served as the home stadium of SJK prior to their move to a new stadium in 2016.

Stadium was opened in 1952 and renovated in 1975.
