= 2014 SJK season =

SJK
2014 season
- Chairman: Raimo Sarajärvi
- Manager: Simo Valakari
- Stadium: Seinäjoen keskuskenttä
- Veikkausliiga: 2nd
- Finnish Cup: Quarterfinal vs Lahti
- League Cup: Champions
- Top goalscorer: League: Akseli Pelvas (11); All: Akseli Pelvas (12)
Home colours	Away colours

The 2014 season is Seinäjoen Jalkapallokerho's 7th competitive season, and first season in the Veikkausliiga.

== Squad ==
Note: Flags indicate national team as defined under FIFA eligibility rules; some limited exceptions apply. Players may hold more than one non-FIFA nationality.

No.	Pos.	Nation	Player
1	GK	BRA	Luís Fernando
3	DF	FIN	Kalle Taimi
4	DF	WAL	Richie Dorman
5	DF	SRB	Pavle Milosavljević (captain)
7	DF	FIN	Timo Tahvanainen
8	MF	FIN	Johannes Laaksonen
9	FW	FIN	Juho Mäkelä
10	MF	ENG	Wayne Brown
11	MF	FIN	Juho Lähde
14	FW	FIN	Toni Lehtinen
15	DF	SRB	Željko Savić
17	MF	FIN	Teemu Penninkangas
18	MF	USA	Justin Moose
19	MF	EST	Gert Kams
20	MF	FIN	Marco Matrone

No.	Pos.	Nation	Player
21	DF	FIN	Timo Rauhala
22	DF	FIN	Matti Lähitie
23	MF	FIN	Jyri Hietaharju
24	FW	FIN	Sami Viljanen
26	FW	FIN	Akseli Pelvas
27	DF	CIV	Cédric Gogoua
29	DF	ENG	Arinse Uade
33	GK	EST	Mihkel Aksalu
35	GK	FIN	Paavo Valakari
36	MF	FIN	Aki Sipilä
51	MF	FIN	Elias Ahde
58	MF	FIN	Emil Lidman
59	MF	FIN	Joona Lautamaja
65	MF	FIN	Jesse Sarajärvi
70	MF	FIN	Tuomas Lähdesmäki

=== On loan ===
Note: Flags indicate national team as defined under FIFA eligibility rules; some limited exceptions apply. Players may hold more than one non-FIFA nationality.

No.	Pos.	Nation	Player
10	FW	FIN	Jussi Aalto (at KTP)
28	DF	FIN	Felipe Aspegren (at TPS)

No.	Pos.	Nation	Player
31	GK	FIN	Ville Viljala (at Jaro)

== Transfers ==
=== Winter ===
In: Note: Flags indicate national team as defined under FIFA eligibility rules; some limited exceptions apply. Players may hold more than one non-FIFA nationality.

No.	Pos.	Nation	Player
6	MF	ESP	Hectór García
9	FW	ESP	Carlos Lopez
10	FW	FIN	Jussi Aalto (from (Finland) Haka)
11	MF	FIN	Juho Lähde (from (Finland) TPS)
15	DF	SRB	Željko Savić
20	MF	FIN	Marco Matrone (from (Finland) Haka)
26	FW	FIN	Akseli Pelvas (from (Finland) HJK, previously on loan)
27	DF	CIV	Cédric Gogoua (from (Ivory Coast) Issia Wazy)
28	DF	FIN	Felipe Aspegren (from (Finland) Inter Turku)
31	GK	FIN	Ville Viljala (from (Finland) JJK)

Out: Note: Flags indicate national team as defined under FIFA eligibility rules; some limited exceptions apply. Players may hold more than one non-FIFA nationality.

No.	Pos.	Nation	Player
9	FW	BRA	Caumo (to (Finland) Kajaani)
10	MF	ENG	Chris Cleaver
11	MF	EST	Stanislav Goldberg (to (Estonia) Paide)
15	FW	FIN	Kim Palosaari (to (Finland) KPV Kokkola)
20	MF	FIN	Juuso Aalto (to (Finland) JIPPO)
30	GK	FIN	Tomas Karike (to (Finland) Klubi-04)
31	GK	SWE	Joakim Jans
33	GK	FIN	Tuomas Karjanlahti (to (Finland) Ilves-Kissat)
28	MF	ESP	Juli Serrano (to (England) Oxford City)

=== Summer ===
In: Note: Flags indicate national team as defined under FIFA eligibility rules; some limited exceptions apply. Players may hold more than one non-FIFA nationality.

No.	Pos.	Nation	Player
9	FW	FIN	Juho Mäkelä (from (Finland) IFK Mariehamn)
10	MF	ENG	Wayne Brown (from (Finland) TPS)
29	DF	ENG	Arinse Uade (from (England) Arsenal)

Out: Note: Flags indicate national team as defined under FIFA eligibility rules; some limited exceptions apply. Players may hold more than one non-FIFA nationality.

No.	Pos.	Nation	Player
6	MF	ESP	Hectór García
9	FW	ESP	Carlos Lopez (to (Finland) Haka)
10	FW	FIN	Jussi Aalto (loan to (Finland) KTP)
25	MF	ESP	Josu (to (Italy) Terracina)
31	GK	FIN	Ville Viljala (loan to (Finland) Jaro)

== Competitions ==
=== Veikkausliiga ===
The 2014 Veikkausliiga season began on April 12, 2015, and ended on October 25, 2015. Veikkausliiga takes place in the spring to autumn season, due to harsh winter weather conditions in Finland.

==== League table ====
Pos	Team	Pld	W	D	L	GF	GA	GD	Pts	Qualification or relegation
1	HJK (C)	33	21	9	3	65	22	+43	72	Qualification to Champions League second qualifying round
2	SJK	33	16	11	6	40	26	+14	59	Qualification to Europa League first qualifying round
3	FC Lahti	33	15	13	5	45	23	+22	58	Qualification to Europa League first qualifying round
4	VPS	33	13	9	11	39	34	+5	48	Qualification to Europa League first qualifying round
5	IFK Mariehamn	33	14	6	13	49	55	−6	48	

Source: veikkausliiga.com
Rules for classification: 1) Points; 2) Goal difference; 3) Number of goals scored
(C) Champions

==== Results summary ====
Overall								Home						Away					
Pld	W	D	L	GF	GA	GD	Pts	W	D	L	GF	GA	GD	W	D	L	GF	GA	GD
33	16	11	6	40	26	+14	59	10	4	2	23	10	+13	6	7	4	17	16	+1

Last updated: 25 October 2015.
Source: Soccerway

==== Results by matchday ====
Matchday	1	2	3	4	5	6	7	8	9	10	11	12	13	14	15	16	17	18	19	20	21	22	23	24	25	26	27	28	29	30	31	32	33
Ground																																	
Result																																	
Position																																	

Source: Soccerway
A = Away; H = Home; W = Win; D = Draw; L = Loss

==== Results ====
12 April 2014 1	RoPS	1 – 1	SJK	Rovaniemi
16:00 EEST (UTC+3)	Kokko 36'	Report	P.Milosavljević 65'; Dorman (yellow card) 84'	Stadium: Rovaniemen keskuskenttä Attendance: 1,251; Referee: Marko Grönholm

19 April 2014 2	Inter Turku	2 – 1	SJK	Turku
16:00 EEST (UTC+3)	Kauppi (yellow card) 29'; Sirbiladze 31'; Nyman (yellow card) 42'; Gruborovics 47' (pen.); Paajanen (yellow card) 89'; Onovo (yellow card) 90+1'; D.Camara (red card) 90+3'	Report	Pelvas 23'; Lähitie (yellow card) 45'; Dorman (yellow card) 46'; Moose (yellow card) 71'	Stadium: Veritas Stadion; Attendance: 1,621; Referee: Ville Nevalainen

23 April 2014 3	SJK	2 – 0	KuPS	Seinäjoki
18:30 EEST (UTC+3)	Lopez 19' (pen.), 32'	Report	Rannankari (yellow card) 18'; Sohna (yellow card) 27' (yellow-red card) 45+1'	Stadium: Seinäjoen keskuskenttä Attendance: 1,747; Referee: Jari Järvinen

4 May 2014 5	Lahti	1 – 1	SJK	Lahti
18:30 EEST (UTC+3)	L.Hertsi (yellow card) 72'; M.Salimäki 74'	Report	Lähde 42'	Stadium: Kisapuisto; Attendance: 2,051; Referee: Petteri Kari

8 May 2014 6	SJK	0 – 0	Honka	Seinäjoki
18:30 EEST (UTC+3)		Report	A.Kabashi (yellow card) 39'; Pritchard (yellow card) 82'	Stadium: Seinäjoen keskuskenttä Attendance: 1,578; Referee: Ville Nevalainen

12 May 2014 7	TPS	2 – 0	SJK	Turku
18:30 EEST (UTC+3)	Jovanović 27' (yellow card) 69'; Brown 38' (yellow card) 65'; Maluka (yellow card) 88'	Report	Josu (yellow card) 59'	Stadium: Veritas Stadion; Attendance: 1,746; Referee: Dennis Antamo

17 May 2014 8	SJK	3 – 0	IFK Mariehamn	Seinäjoki
16:00 EEST (UTC+3)	Moose 17'; Gogoua (yellow card) 32'; Laaksonen 45+1'; Lehtinen 63'	Report	Ramadingaye (red card) 48'; Friberg (yellow card) 63'; Solignac (yellow card) 68'; Byskata (yellow card) 70'	Stadium: Seinäjoen keskuskenttä Attendance: 1,691; Referee: Antti Munukka

23 May 2014 9	SJK	0 – 1	FF Jaro	Seinäjoki
18:30 EEST (UTC+3)	Matrone (yellow card) 49'; Lopez (yellow card) 85'	Report	Winchester 15'; Svanbäck (yellow card) 80'	Stadium: Seinäjoen keskuskenttä Attendance: 2,961; Referee: Dennis Antamo

26 May 2014 10	HJK	1 – 0	SJK	Helsinki
18:30 EEST (UTC+3)	Kandji 88'	Report	Laaksonen (yellow card) 79'	Stadium: Sonera Stadium; Attendance: 6,011; Referee: Vesa Hätilä

4 June 2014 11	SJK	1 – 0	MYPA	Seinäjoki
18:30 EEST (UTC+3)	Tahvanainen (yellow card) 24'; Lehtinen 36' (pen.); Gogoua (yellow card) 67'; Lähde (yellow card) 80'	Report	A.Koskinen (yellow card) 78'; Pirinen (yellow card) 82'	Stadium: Seinäjoen keskuskenttä Attendance: 2,349; Referee: Marko Grönholm

11 June 2014 12	MYPA	1 – 3	SJK	Kouvola
18:30 EEST (UTC+3)	Aho (yellow card) 44'; Abdulahi 88'; P.Soiri (yellow card) 90'	Report	Abdulahi 8' (o.g.); Pelvas 34'; Moose 34'; Ž.Savić (yellow card) 51'; Tahvanainen (yellow card) 71'; Laaksonen (yellow card) 81'; Brown (yellow card) 90'	Stadium: Kymenlaakson Sähkö Stadion; Attendance: 1,726; Referee: Jari Järvinen

15 June 2014 13	SJK	1 – 0	RoPS	Seinäjoki
16:00 EEST (UTC+3)	Matrone (yellow card) 34'; Dorman 49'; Tahvanainen (yellow card) 84'	Report	Okkonen (yellow card) 84'	Stadium: Seinäjoen keskuskenttä Attendance: 1,438; Referee: Dennis Antamo

18 June 2014 14	VPS	0 – 1	SJK	Vaasa
18:30 EEST (UTC+3)	Dafaa (yellow card) 68'	Report	Ž.Savić (yellow card) 25'; Laaksonen 80'	Stadium: Hietalahti Stadium; Attendance: 3,778; Referee: Mattias Gestranius

23 June 2014 15	SJK	2 – 1	Honka	Seinäjoki
18:30 EEST (UTC+3)	Lehtinen 37' (pen.); Matrone (yellow card) 38'; Moose 82'; Kams (yellow card) 90+2'	Report	Rexhepi (yellow card) 64'; Aalto (yellow card) 81'; Ž.Savić 84' (o.g.)	Stadium: Seinäjoen keskuskenttä Attendance: 1,521; Referee: Vesa Hätilä

27 June 2014 16	TPS	0 – 1	SJK	Turku
19:30 EEST (UTC+3)	Agyiri (yellow card) 81'	Report	Lehtinen 61'	Stadium: Veritas Stadion; Attendance: 2,784; Referee: Jari Järvinen

2 July 2014 17	SJK	3 – 0	IFK Mariehamn	Seinäjoki
18:30 EEST (UTC+3)	Lehtinen 6', 18'; Tahvanainen 32'; Gogoua (yellow card) 74'	Report	Thompson (yellow card) 89'	Stadium: Seinäjoen keskuskenttä Attendance: 1,239; Referee: Petri Viljanen

7 July 2014 18	Lahti	1 – 1	SJK	Lahti
18:30 EEST (UTC+3)	Rafael 3' (pen.); Korte (yellow card) 76'	Report	Tahvanainen (yellow card) 75'; Laaksonen 88'	Stadium: Kisapuisto; Attendance: 3,757; Referee: Petteri Kari

12 July 2014 19	SJK	0 – 0	KuPS	Seinäjoki
16:00 EEST (UTC+3)		Report		Stadium: Seinäjoen keskuskenttä Attendance: 2,752; Referee: Marko Grönholm

19 July 2014 20	HJK	2 – 0	SJK	Helsinki
16:00 EEST (UTC+3)	Heikkinen (yellow card) 16'; Forssell 29' (pen.); Konan 31' (yellow card) 32'; Baah (yellow card) 43'	Report		Stadium: Sonera Stadium; Attendance: 3,690; Referee: Petteri Kari

26 July 2014 21	FF Jaro	0 – 1	SJK	Jakobstad
16:00 EEST (UTC+3)	David (yellow card) 35'; Svanbäck (yellow card) 40'; Winchester (yellow card) 42'	Report	Matrone (yellow card) 26'; Pelvas 90'	Stadium: Jakobstads Centralplan; Attendance: 3,262; Referee: Antti Munukka

3 August 2014 22	SJK	2 – 2	Inter Turku	Seinäjoki
18:30 EEST (UTC+3)	Pelvas 50'; Lehtinen 87'; Brown (yellow card) 87'; Dorman (yellow card) 90+4'	Report	Paajanen 36'; J.Hämäläinen 47'; Lehtonen (yellow card) 82'; Bahne (yellow card) 87'; Gruborovics (yellow card) 89'	Stadium: Seinäjoen keskuskenttä Attendance: 2,779; Referee: Ville Nevalainen

9 August 2014 23	Inter Turku	1 – 1	SJK	Turku
16:00 EEST (UTC+3)	Marinković (yellow card) 40'; Kauppi (yellow card) 57'; J.Salminen 89'	Report	Matrone (yellow card) 33'; Laaksonen 53'	Stadium: Veritas Stadion; Attendance: 1,149; Referee: Tero Nieminen

13 August 2014 24	SJK	1 – 0	FF Jaro	Seinäjoki
18:30 EEST (UTC+3)	Lehtinen (yellow card) 5' (goal) 59' (pen.); Matrone (yellow card) 35'; P.Milosavljević (yellow card) 80'	Report	Vaganov (yellow card) 2'; Svanbäck (yellow card) 69' (yellow-red card) 79'; Opiyo (yellow card) 71'; David (yellow card) 80'	Stadium: Seinäjoen keskuskenttä Attendance: 2,442; Referee: Antti Munukka

17 August 2014 4	VPS	0 – 1	SJK	Vaasa
18:30 EEST (UTC+3)	Morrissey (yellow card) 60'; Koskimaa (yellow card) 78'; J.Engström (yellow card) 79'	Report	Ž.Savić 23'	Stadium: Hietalahti Stadium; Attendance: 2,968; Referee: Mattias Gestranius

24 August 2014 25	SJK	2 – 0	HJK	Seinäjoki
18:30 EEST (UTC+3)	Laaksonen (yellow card) 26'; Pelvas 59', 86' (pen.)	Report	Baah (yellow card) 40'; Konan (yellow card) 55'	Stadium: Seinäjoen keskuskenttä Attendance: 4,079; Referee: Dennis Antamo

31 August 2014 26	KuPS	0 – 0	SJK	Kuopio
18:30 EEST (UTC+3)		Report	Dorman (yellow card) 89'	Stadium: Savon Sanomat Areena; Attendance: 2,123; Referee: Marko Grönholm

13 September 2014 27	SJK	1 – 1	Lahti	Seinäjoki
16:00 EEST (UTC+3)	Dorman (yellow card) 55'; Pelvas 59'; Gogoua (yellow card) 82'	Report	Gela 15' (yellow card) 66'; Toivomäki (yellow card) 38'; L.Hertsi (yellow card) 42'	Stadium: Seinäjoen keskuskenttä Attendance: 3,311; Referee: Tero Nieminen

17 September 2014 28	IFK Mariehamn	2 – 2	SJK	Mariehamn
18:30 EEST (UTC+3)	Kojola 14'; Lyyski 43'; Tammilehto (yellow card) 73'	Report	Pelvas 71'; Kams 78'; P.Milosavljević (yellow card) 90'	Stadium: Wiklöf Holding Arena; Attendance: 1,310; Referee: Petri Viljanen

21 September 2014 29	SJK	2 – 1	TPS	Seinäjoki
16:00 EEST (UTC+3)	Lähde 2'; Pelvas 14'	Report	Hyyrynen (yellow card) 36'; Rähmönen 44'; N.Blomqvist (yellow card) 53'	Stadium: Seinäjoen keskuskenttä Attendance: 1,425; Referee: Jani Laaksonen

28 September 2014 30	Honka	1 – 1	SJK	Espoo
17:00 EEST (UTC+3)	K.Manev (yellow card) 27'; Couñago (yellow card) 65'; Mäkijärvi 86'	Report	Gogoua (yellow card) 83'; Laaksonen 90'	Stadium: Tapiolan Urheilupuisto; Attendance: 1,062; Referee: Marko Grönholm

5 October 2014 31	SJK	0 – 3	VPS	Seinäjoki
14:00 EEST (UTC+3)	Aksalu (yellow card) 17'; Gogoua (yellow card) 29'; Dorman (yellow card) 40'	Report	Stewart 15'; Morrissey 19'; Seabrook 74'	Stadium: Seinäjoen keskuskenttä Attendance: 3,319; Referee: Dennis Antamo

18 October 2014 32	RoPS	1 – 2	SJK	Rovaniemi
14:00 EEST (UTC+3)	Mäkitalo (yellow card) 36'; N.Alison (yellow card) 39'; S.Roiha 45+2'; Gay (yellow card) 57'	Report	Pelvas 28', 42' (pen.); Laaksonen (yellow card) 45'	Stadium: Rovaniemen keskuskenttä Attendance: 1,104; Referee: Mattias Gestranius

25 October 2014 33	SJK	3 – 1	MYPA	Seinäjoki
14:00 EEST (UTC+3)	Kams 15', 50' (yellow card) 50'; Gogoua 27'	Report	Stefano (yellow card) 58'; Salmikivi 72'; A.Koskinen (yellow card) 88'; Abdulahi (yellow card) 90'	Stadium: Seinäjoen keskuskenttä Attendance: 1,954; Referee: Antti Munukka

=== Finnish Cup ===
15 April 2014 Sixth round	HIFK	0 – 1 (a.e.t.)	SJK	Helsinki
18:30 EEST (UTC+3)	K.Sotka (yellow card) 45+2'; Halme (yellow card) 66'; Kuusijärvi (yellow card) 90+5'	Report	Matrone (yellow card) 41'; Dorman (yellow card) 80'; Pelvas 103'	Stadium: Sonera Stadium; Attendance: 743; Referee: Jani Laaksonen

30 April 2014 Quarterfinal	SJK	0 – 1	Lahti	Seinäjoki
18:00 EEST (UTC+3)	Dorman (yellow card) 56'	Report	Kärkkäinen (yellow card) 14'; Ngueukam 45' (pen.)	Stadium: Jouppilanvuoren tekonurmi Attendance: 629; Referee: Dennis Antamo

=== League Cup ===
==== Group stage ====
Pos	Team	Pld	W	D	L	GF	GA	GD	Pts	VPS	SJK	JAR
1	VPS	4	2	1	1	10	7	+3	7		2–3	3–0
2	SJK	4	1	2	1	7	7	0	5	2–3		1–1
3	FF Jaro	4	0	3	1	4	7	−3	3	2–2	1–1	

Updated to match(es) played on 22 February 2014. Source: veikkausliiga.com
Legend: Blue = home team win; Yellow = draw; Red = away team win.
Rules for classification: 1) points 2) head-to-head points 3) head-to-head goal difference 4) head-to-head number of goals scored 5) goal difference 6) number of goals scored

5 February 2014 1	SJK	1 – 1	FF Jaro	Seinäjoki
19:00 EET (UTC+2)	Aalto 40'; Matrone (yellow card) 90+2'	Report	M.Byass 14' (yellow card) 39'; D.Nyman (yellow card) 36'; Emet (yellow card) 75'	Stadium: Wallsport Areena; Referee: Tommi Grönman

8 February 2014 2	SJK	2 – 3	VPS	Seinäjoki
14:30 EET (UTC+2)	Ž.Savić (yellow card) 36'; Laaksonen 41'; Lähde 62'	Report	Dafaa (yellow card) 45'; Strandvall 51', 75'; J.Engström 58'; Lahti (yellow card) 82'	Stadium: Wallsport Areena; Referee: Dennis Antamo

22 February 2014 3	VPS	2 – 3	SJK	Vaasa
14:15 EET (UTC+2)	Strandvall (yellow card) 15' (goal) 86' (pen.); M.Niemi (yellow card) 27'; T.Kula 78'	Report	Lähde 5'; Lopez 12'; Matrone (yellow card) 44'; Kams (yellow card) 86'; Moose 87'	Stadium: Fennia Arena; Referee: Ville Nevalainen

1 March 2014 4	FF Jaro	1 – 1	SJK	Jakobstad
15:15 EET (UTC+2)	Helmke (yellow card) 31'; Kronholm 39'	Report	Matrone 51' (yellow card) 62'; Aspegren (yellow card) 55'; T.Penninkangas (yellow card) 90+1'	Stadium: Tellushalli; Referee: Ville Nevalainen

==== Knockout stages ====
9 March 2014 Quarterfinal	KuPS	0 – 1	SJK	Kuopio
15:00 EET (UTC+2)		Report	Matrone (yellow card) 73'; Taipale 81' (o.g.)	Stadium: Kuopio Football Stadium; Referee: Tommi Grönman

15 March 2014 Semifinal	SJK	1 – 0	HJK	Seinäjoki
14:00 EET (UTC+2)	T.Penninkangas (yellow card) 25'; Currais 50'; Lopez (yellow card) 56'; Matrone (yellow card) 76'	Report	E.Tamburini (yellow card) 19'; S.Hirvonen (yellow card) 54'; R.Peiponen (yellow card) 81'	Stadium: Wallsport Areena; Referee: Vesa Hätilä

29 March 2014 Final	SJK	1 – 0	VPS	Seinäjoki
14:00 EET (UTC+2)	Lopez 15'; Dorman (yellow card) 33'; Matrone (yellow card) 61'; Aksalu (yellow card) 89'; Lehtinen (yellow card) 90+1'	Report	Morrissey (yellow card) 18'; Strandvall (yellow card) 50'	Stadium: Jouppilanvuoren tekonurmi Referee: Antti Munukka

== Squad statistics ==
As of match played 25 October 2015

=== Appearances and goals ===
No.	Pos	Nat	Player	Total		Veikkausliiga		Finnish Cup		League Cup	
No.	Pos	Nat	Player	Apps	Goals	Apps	Goals	Apps	Goals	Apps	Goals
1	GK	(Brazil) BRA	Luís Fernando	3	0	3	0	0	0	0	0
3	DF	(Finland) FIN	Kalle Taimi	2	0	0	0	0	0	2	0
4	DF	(Wales) WAL	Richie Dorman	35	1	27+2	1	2	0	4	0
5	DF	(Serbia) SRB	Pavle Milosavljević	26	1	20	1	2	0	4	0
7	DF	(Finland) FIN	Timo Tahvanainen	34	1	17+9	1	2	0	6	0
8	MF	(Finland) FIN	Johannes Laaksonen	39	6	29+2	5	1+1	0	5+1	1
9	FW	(Finland) FIN	Juho Mäkelä	6	0	1+5	0	0	0	0	0
10	MF	(England) ENG	Wayne Brown	11	0	11	0	0	0	0	0
11	MF	(Finland) FIN	Juho Lähde	35	4	17+9	2	2	0	7	2
14	FW	(Finland) FIN	Toni Lehtinen	34	8	24+6	8	0	0	0+4	0
15	DF	(Serbia) SRB	Željko Savić	42	1	33	1	2	0	7	0
17	MF	(Finland) FIN	Teemu Penninkangas	19	0	6+5	0	1	0	3+4	0
18	MF	(United States) USA	Justin Moose	40	4	30+2	3	2	0	4+2	1
19	MF	(Estonia) EST	Gert Kams	36	3	23+7	3	1+1	0	4	0
20	MF	(Finland) FIN	Marco Matrone	40	1	29+3	0	1	0	7	1
22	DF	(Finland) FIN	Matti Lähitie	14	0	6+4	0	0	0	2+2	0
23	MF	(Finland) FIN	Jyri Hietaharju	1	0	0	0	0+1	0	0	0
26	FW	(Finland) FIN	Akseli Pelvas	34	12	22+7	11	0+1	1	2+2	0
27	DF	(Ivory Coast) CIV	Cédric Gogoua	23	1	23	1	0	0	0	0
28	DF	(Finland) FIN	Felipe Aspegren	7	0	2	0	1+1	0	2+1	0
33	GK	(Estonia) EST	Mihkel Aksalu	38	0	30	0	2	0	6	0
65	MF	(Finland) FIN	Jesse Sarajärvi	4	0	1+2	0	0	0	0+1	0
70	MF	(Finland) FIN	Tuomas Lähdesmäki	1	0	0	0	0	0	0+1	0
Players away from SJK on loan:
10	FW	(Finland) FIN	Jussi Aalto	3	1	0	0	0	0	1+2	1
31	GK	(Finland) FIN	Ville Viljala	1	0	0	0	0	0	1	0
Players who left SJK during the season:
6	MF	(Spain) ESP	Hectór García	6	0	1+2	0	0	0	3	0
9	MF	(Finland) FIN	Jesper Brechtel	2	0	0	0	0	0	2	0
9	FW	(Spain) ESP	Carlos Lopez	16	4	5+5	2	2	0	4	2
25	MF	(Spain) ESP	Josu	9	1	3+3	0	1	0	2	1

=== Goal scorers ===
Place	Position	Nation	Number	Name	Veikkausliiga	Finnish Cup	League Cup	Total
1	FW	(Finland)	26	Akseli Pelvas	11	1	0	12
2	FW	(Finland)	14	Toni Lehtinen	8	0	0	8
3	MF	(Finland)	8	Johannes Laaksonen	5	0	1	6
4	MF	(United States)	18	Justin Moose	3	0	1	4
4	MF	(Finland)	11	Juho Lähde	2	0	2	4
4	FW	(Spain)	9	Carlos Lopez	2	0	2	4
7	MF	(Estonia)	19	Gert Kams	3	0	0	3
8				Own goal	1	0	1	2
9	DF	(Serbia)	5	Pavle Milosavljević	1	0	0	1
9	DF	(Finland)	7	Timo Tahvanainen	1	0	0	1
9	DF	(Wales)	4	Richie Dorman	1	0	0	1
9	DF	(Serbia)	15	Željko Savić	1	0	0	1
9	DF	(Ivory Coast)	27	Cédric Gogoua	1	0	0	1
9	FW	(Finland)	10	Jussi Aalto	0	0	1	1
9	MF	(Finland)	20	Marco Matrone	0	0	1	1
9	MF	(Spain)	25	Josu	0	0	1	1
TOTALS					40	1	10	51

=== Clean sheets ===
Place	Position	Nation	Number	Name	Veikkausliiga	Finnish Cup	League Cup	Total
1	GK	(Estonia)	33	Mihkel Aksalu	14	1	3	18
TOTALS					14	1	3	18

=== Disciplinary record ===
Number	Nation	Position	Name	Veikkausliiga		Finnish Cup		League Cup		Total	
Number	Nation	Position	Name	Yellow card	Red card	Yellow card	Red card	Yellow card	Red card	Yellow card	Red card
4	(Wales)	DF	Richie Dorman	6	0	2	0	1	0	9	0
5	(Serbia)	DF	Pavle Milosavljević	2	0	0	0	0	0	2	0
7	(Finland)	DF	Timo Tahvanainen	4	0	0	0	0	0	4	0
8	(Finland)	MF	Johannes Laaksonen	4	0	0	0	0	0	4	0
10	(England)	MF	Wayne Brown	2	0	0	0	0	0	2	0
11	(Finland)	MF	Juho Lähde	1	0	0	0	0	0	1	0
14	(Finland)	FW	Toni Lehtinen	1	0	0	0	1	0	2	0
15	(Serbia)	DF	Željko Savić	2	0	0	0	1	0	3	0
17	(Finland)	MF	Teemu Penninkangas	0	0	0	0	2	0	2	0
18	(United States)	MF	Justin Moose	1	0	0	0	0	0	1	0
19	(Estonia)	MF	Gert Kams	2	0	0	0	1	0	3	0
20	(Finland)	MF	Marco Matrone	6	0	1	0	6	0	13	0
22	(Finland)	DF	Matti Lähitie	1	0	0	0	0	0	1	0
27	(Ivory Coast)	DF	Cédric Gogoua	6	0	0	0	0	0	6	0
28	(Finland)	DF	Felipe Aspegren	0	0	0	0	1	0	1	0
33	(Estonia)	GK	Mihkel Aksalu	1	0	0	0	1	0	2	0
Players who left SJK during the season:
9	(Spain)	FW	Carlos Lopez	1	0	0	0	1	0	2	0
25	(Spain)	MF	Josu	1	0	0	0	0	0	1	0
TOTALS				41	0	3	0	15	0	59	0
