= 2014 Finnish League Cup =

2014 Liigacup
Tournament details
- Country: Finland
- Dates: 24 January – 29 March 2014
- Teams: 12

Final positions
- Champions: SJK
- Runners-up: VPS

Tournament statistics
- Matches played: 31
- Goals scored: 87 (2.81 per match)
- Top goal scorer: (Finland) Sebastian Strandvall (5 goals)

The 2014 Finnish League Cup will be the 18th season of the Finnish League Cup, Finland's second-most prestigious cup football tournament. FC Lahti are the defending champions, having won their second league cup last year.

The cup consists of two stages. First, there will be a group stage that involves the 12 Veikkausliiga teams divided into four groups. The top two teams from each group will enter the one-legged elimination rounds – quarter-finals, semi-finals, and the final.

== Group stage ==
Every team will play every other team in its group twice, both home and away. The group stage matches will be played from January 2014.

=== Group A ===
Pos	Team	Pld	W	D	L	GF	GA	GD	Pts	INT	MAR	TPS
1	FC Inter	4	3	0	1	9	6	+3	9		2–1	3–2
2	IFK Mariehamn	4	2	1	1	6	4	+2	7	1–0		2–2
3	TPS	4	0	1	3	6	11	−5	1	2–4	0–2	

Updated to match(es) played on 2 March 2014. Source: veikkausliiga.com
Legend: Blue = home team win; Yellow = draw; Red = away team win.
Rules for classification: 1) points 2) head-to-head points 3) head-to-head goal difference 4) head-to-head number of goals scored 5) goal difference 6) number of goals scored

24 January 2014 Group stage	FC Inter	3–2	TPS	Turku
16:00 EET (UTC+02)	Paajanen 13'; Lindström 30'; Kauppi 72'		Ahmeti 39'; Peltola 90+1'	Stadium: Kupittaa 5

31 January 2014 Group stage	TPS	2–4	FC Inter	Turku
17:00 EET (UTC+02)	Ahmeti 20', 55'		Duah 16'; Paajanen 30'; Gruborovics 40'; Sirbiladze 86'	Stadium: Kupittaa 5

7 February 2014 Group stage	TPS	0–2	IFK Mariehamn	Turku
17:00 EET (UTC+02)			Solignac 6'; Mäkinen 72'	Stadium: Kupittaa 5

14 February 2014 Group stage	FC Inter	2–1	IFK Mariehamn	Turku
16:00 EET (UTC+02)	Owusu-Ansah 11'; Forss 77'		Ibrahim 90'	Stadium: Kupittaa 5

19 February 2014 Group stage	IFK Mariehamn	2–2	TPS	Eckerö, Åland
18:30 EET (UTC+02)	Ibrahim 71'; Ekhalie 84'		De John 10'; Hyyrynen 89'	Stadium: Eckeröhallen

2 March 2014 Group stage	IFK Mariehamn	1–0	FC Inter	Eckerö, Åland
18:30 EET (UTC+02)	Solignac 69'			Stadium: Eckeröhallen

=== Group B ===
Pos	Team	Pld	W	D	L	GF	GA	GD	Pts	HON	HJK	RPS
1	FC Honka	4	1	3	0	6	5	+1	6		1–1	1–0
2	HJK	4	1	2	1	6	7	−1	5	3–3		2–0
3	RoPS	4	1	1	2	4	4	0	4	1–1	3–0	

Updated to match(es) played on 23 November 2013. Source: veikkausliiga.com
Legend: Blue = home team win; Yellow = draw; Red = away team win.
Rules for classification: 1) points 2) head-to-head points 3) head-to-head goal difference 4) head-to-head number of goals scored 5) goal difference 6) number of goals scored

30 January 2014 Group stage	HJK	2–0	RoPS	Helsinki
17:00 EET (UTC+02)	Sorsa 44'; Alho 81'			Stadium: Tali Halli

1 February 2014 Group stage	Honka	1–0	RoPS	Espoo
17:00 EET (UTC+02)	Kolsi 74'			Stadium: Ratiopharm Areena

5 February 2014 Group stage	Honka	1–1	HJK	Espoo
15:00 EET (UTC+02)	Anyamele 58'		Tveit 43'	Stadium: Ratiopharm Areena

8 February 2014 Group stage	RoPS	1–1	Honka	Rovaniemi
15:00 EET (UTC+02)	Virtanen 12'		Äijälä 69' (pen.)	Stadium: Ounashalli

20 February 2014 Group stage	HJK	3–3	Honka	Helsinki
17:00 EET (UTC+02)	Forssell 21', 51', 87' (pen.)		Porokara 4' (o.g.); Hetemaj 61'; Mombilo 65'	Stadium: Tali Halli

28 February 2014 Group stage	RoPS	3–0	HJK	Rovaniemi
18:00 EET (UTC+02)	Otaru 66'; Mäkitalo 71'; Saxman 75'			Stadium: Ounashalli

=== Group C ===
Pos	Team	Pld	W	D	L	GF	GA	GD	Pts	KPS	MYP	LAH
1	KuPS	4	2	1	1	5	1	+4	7		3–0	0–0
2	MYPA	4	2	0	2	4	6	−2	6	1–0		2–1
3	FC Lahti	4	1	1	2	3	5	−2	4	0–2	2–1	

Updated to match(es) played on 23 November 2013. Source: veikkausliiga.com
Legend: Blue = home team win; Yellow = draw; Red = away team win.
Rules for classification: 1) points 2) head-to-head points 3) head-to-head goal difference 4) head-to-head number of goals scored 5) goal difference 6) number of goals scored

25 January 2014 Group stage	Lahti	2–1	MYPA	Lahti
13:00 EET (UTC+02)	Tanska 45+2'; Ngueukam 59'		Dema 87'	Stadium: Mukkulahalli

1 February 2014 Group stage	Lahti	0–2	KuPS	Lahti
13:00 EET (UTC+02)			Purje 28'; Paananen 50'	Stadium: Mukkulahalli

7 February 2014 Group stage	KuPS	0–0	Lahti	Kuopio
17:00 EET (UTC+02)				Stadium: Kuopiohalli

14 February 2014 Group stage	KuPS	3–0	MYPA	Kuopio
18:00 EET (UTC+02)	Ilo 27', 51'; Purje 90+2'			Stadium: Kuopiohalli

22 February 2014 Group stage	MYPA	2–1	Lahti	Imatra
13:00 EET (UTC+02)	Pinho 53'; Sihvola 55'		Shala 66' (pen.)	Stadium: Aviasport Arena

1 March 2014 Group stage	MYPA	1–0	KuPS	Anjalankoski
13:00 EET (UTC+02)	Stefano Pinho 50'			Stadium: Kymenlaakson Sähkö Stadion

=== Group D ===
Pos	Team	Pld	W	D	L	GF	GA	GD	Pts	VPS	SJK	JAR
1	VPS	4	2	1	1	10	7	+3	7		2–3	3–0
2	SJK	4	1	2	1	7	7	0	5	2–3		1–1
3	FF Jaro	4	0	3	1	4	7	−3	3	2–2	1–1	

Updated to match(es) played on 22 February 2014. Source: veikkausliiga.com
Legend: Blue = home team win; Yellow = draw; Red = away team win.
Rules for classification: 1) points 2) head-to-head points 3) head-to-head goal difference 4) head-to-head number of goals scored 5) goal difference 6) number of goals scored

1 February 2014 Group stage	Jaro	2–2	VPS	Jakobstad
17:00 EET (UTC+02)	Emet 6'; Kronholm 45'		Björk 38', 60' (pen.)	Stadium: Tellushalli

5 February 2014 Group stage	SJK	1–1	Jaro	Seinäjoki
19:00 EET (UTC+02)	Aalto 40'		Byass 13'	Stadium: Wallsport Areena

8 February 2014 Group stage	SJK	2–3	VPS	Seinäjoki
14:30 EET (UTC+02)	Laaksonen 41'; Lähde 62'		Strandvall 51', 75'; Engström 58'	Stadium: Wallsport Areena

15 February 2014 Group stage	VPS	3–0	Jaro	Vaasa
14:15 EET (UTC+02)	Stewart 18'; Strandvall 63'; Nganbe Nganbe 68'			Stadium: Fennia Arena

22 February 2014 Group stage	VPS	2–3	SJK	Vaasa
14:15 EET (UTC+02)	Kula 78'; Strandvall 86'		Lähde 5'; Carlos Lopez 12'; Moose 87'	Stadium: Fennia Arena

1 March 2014 Group stage	Jaro	1–1	SJK	Jakobstad
15:15 EET (UTC+02)	Kronholm 39'		Matrone 51'	Stadium: Tellushalli

== Knockout stage ==
=== Quarter-finals ===
8 March 2014

FC Inter	1–3	HJK
Marinković 82'		Oussou Konan 17', 62'; Forssell 19'

Tapiolan Urheilupuisto, Espoo

8 March 2014

VPS	3–0	MYPA
Strandvall 29'; Honkaniemi 65'; Nganbe Nganbe 67'

Fennia Arena, Vaasa

9 March 2014

KuPS	0–1	SJK
		Taipale 81' (o.g.)

Savon Sanomat Areena, Kuopio

11 March 2014

FC Honka	1–3	IFK Mariehamn
Väisänen 90+1'		Sid 54'; Assis 90+3'; Ibrahim 90+5'

Ratiopharm Arena, Espoo

=== Semi-finals ===
15 March 2014

IFK Mariehamn	0–4	VPS
		Morrissey 22', 71', 78'; Nganbe Nganbe 90'

Wiklöf Holding Arena, Mariehamn, Åland

15 March 2014

SJK	1–0	HJK
Josué Currais 50'

Wallsport Areena, Seinäjoki

=== Final ===
29 March 2014

SJK	1 – 0	VPS
Carlos López 15'	Report

Jouppilanvuoren tekonurmi, Seinäjoki

== Topscorers ==
Rank	Player	Team	Goals
1	(Finland) Sebastian Strandvall	VPS	5
2	(Finland) Mikael Forssell	HJK	4
3	(Sweden) Josef Ibrahim	Mariehamn	3
3	(Jamaica) Steven Morrissey	VPS	3
