= Mihkel Aksalu =

Estonian footballer (born 1984)

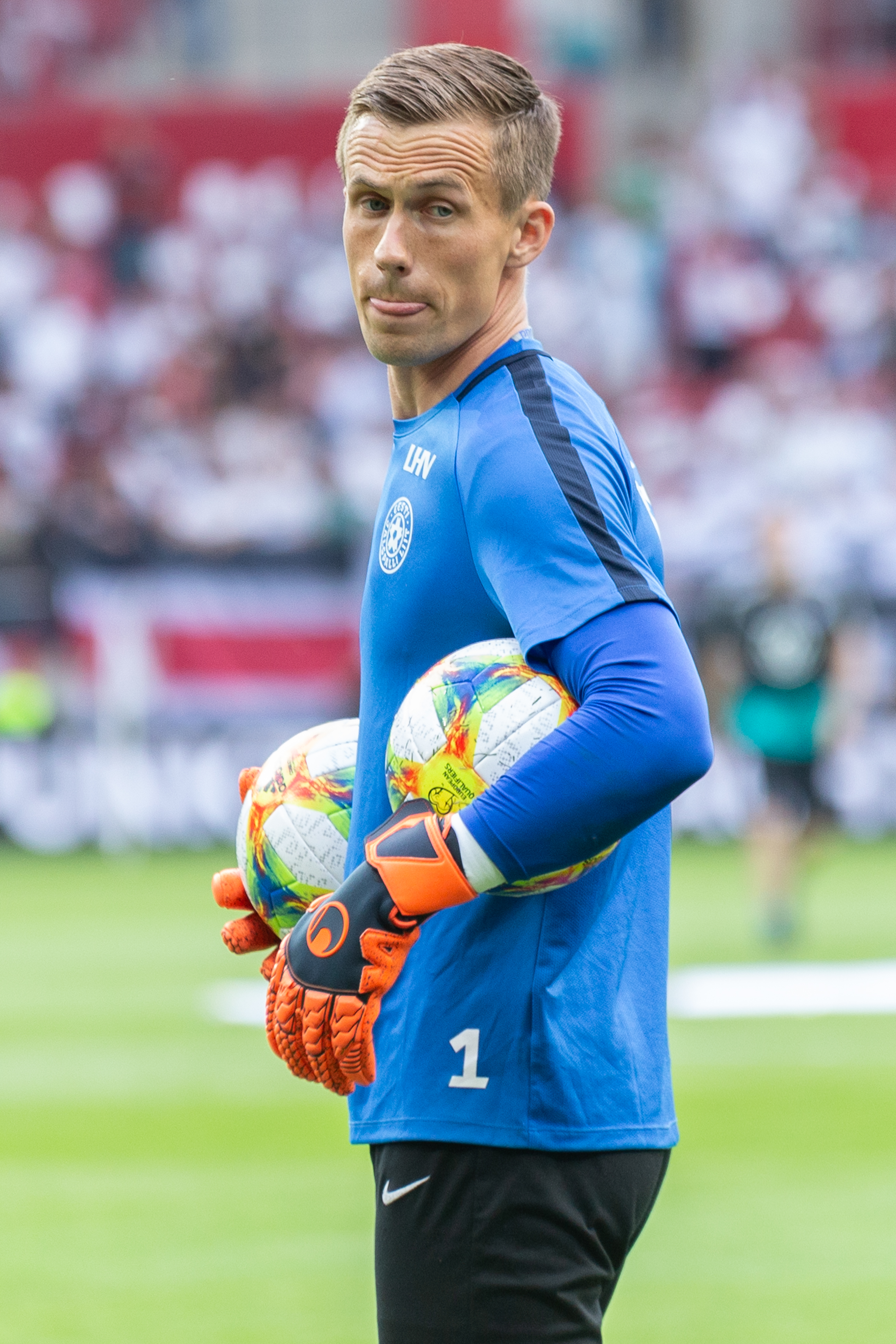
- Aksalu with Estonia in 2019

Personal information
- Full name: Mihkel Aksalu
- Date of birth: 7 November 1984 (age 42)
- Place of birth: Kuressaare, then part of Estonian SSR, Soviet Union
- Height: 1.94 m (6 ft 4 in)
- Position: Goalkeeper

Senior career*
Years	Team	Apps	(Gls)
2000–2002	Sörve	39	(0)
2000	Kuressaare	1	(0)
2003	HÜJK Emmaste	10	(0)
2003–2005	Tervis Pärnu	29	(0)
2003–2009	Flora	115	(0)
2004	Lelle	2	(0)
2006	Flora II	6	(0)
2010–2012	Sheffield United	0	(0)
2010	→ Mansfield Town (loan)	2	(0)
2012	Flora II	1	(0)
2012	Flora	7	(0)
2013–2019	SJK	221	(0)
2021–2024	Paide Linnameeskond	50	(0)
Total		483	(0)

International career
1999–2000	Estonia U16	4	(0)
	Estonia U17	2	(0)
2003	Estonia U20	1	(0)
2004–2007	Estonia U21	13	(0)
2007–2024	Estonia	46	(0)
- * Club domestic league appearances and goals

Mihkel Aksalu (born 7 November 1984) is a former Estonian professional footballer who played as a goalkeeper.

== Club career ==
=== Kuressaare ===
Aksalu joined the youth system of his hometown club Kuressaare and played for their reserve team Muhumaa (renamed Sörve in 2002). He made his debut in the Meistriliiga in his single appearance for Kuressaare on 23 September 2000, in a 4–1 away win over Valga.

=== Flora ===
In December 2002, Aksalu was included in Flora's first team squad for pre-season training. During his first seasons with the club, he mostly played for the club's reserve side Tervis Pärnu. Aksalu became a regular starter for Flora in the 2006 season. His first trophy with Flora came in the 2007–08 Estonian Cup.

=== Sheffield United ===
On 29 January 2010, following a successful trial, Aksalu signed a two-and-a-half-year contract with Championship club Sheffield United for a transfer fee of £180,000. Kevin Blackwell, Sheffield United's manager at the time, claimed Aksalu was the best goalkeeping triallist he had seen in a long time and had the potential to become Estonia's number one. However, Aksalu failed to impress new manager Gary Speed and was unable to break into the first team.

On 6 October 2010, Aksalu joined Conference National club Mansfield Town on a two-month loan. He remained sidelined through most of his spell due to an abdominal muscle problem, making only three appearances before returning to Bramall Lane in December. After a lengthy spell on the sidelines following back surgery, Aksalu was released by the club on 19 January 2012.

=== Return to Flora ===
Following his release, Aksalu returned to Estonia and began training with his former club Flora to regain his fitness. He rejoined the team on 9 April 2012.

=== SJK ===
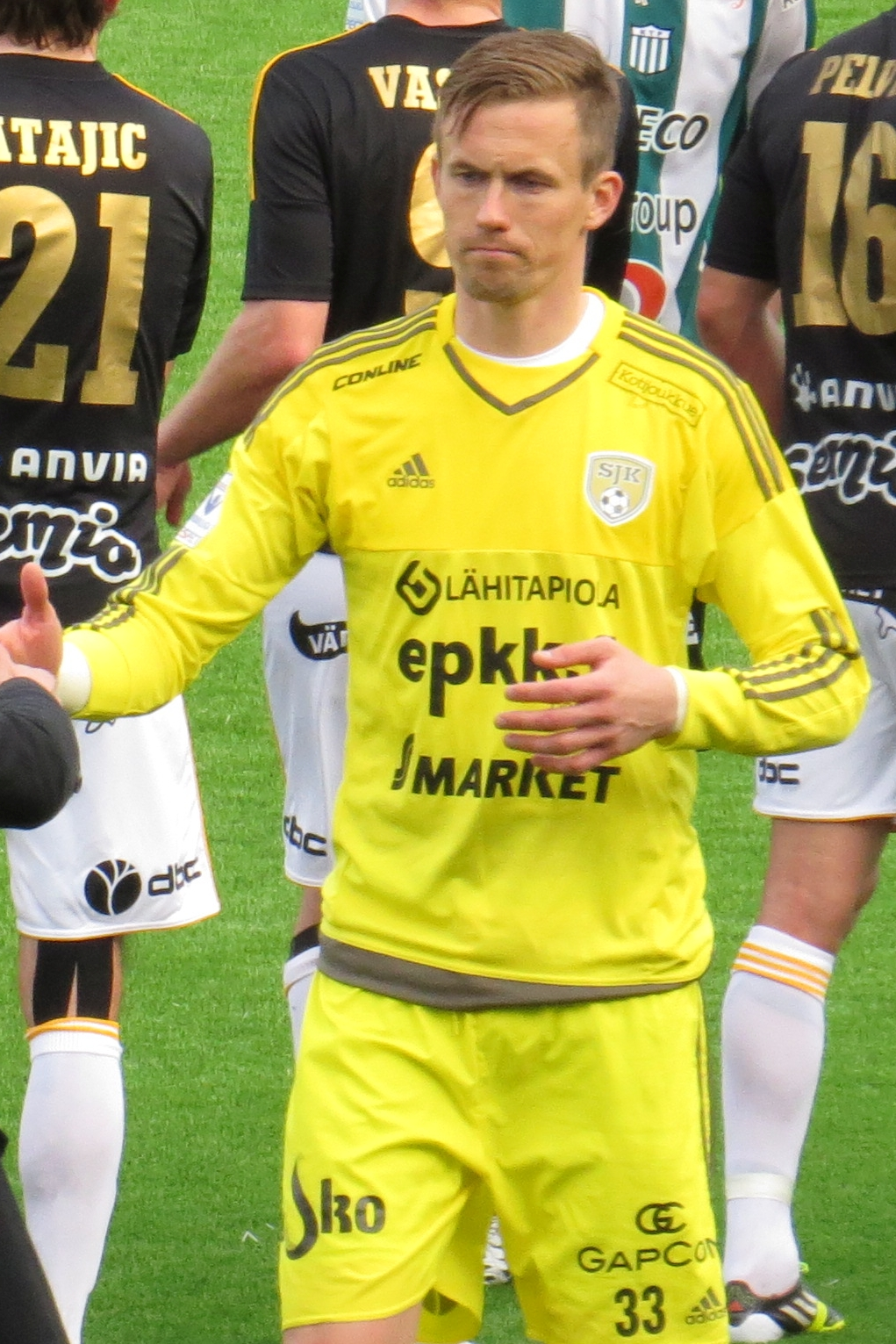
Aksalu with SJK in 2015

On 4 April 2013, Aksalu signed a one-year contract with Ykkönen club SJK. He made his debut for the team on 4 May 2013, in a 2–1 home win over PK-35 Vantaa. SJK won the 2013 Ykkönen and were promoted to the Veikkausliiga. In October 2013, Aksalu signed a new two-year contract with the club. On 24 August 2015, his contract was extended to 2017. Aksalu won the Veikkausliiga title in the 2015 season. He was named league's Best Goalkeeper and SJK's Player of the Year. Aksalu was named club captain ahead of the 2016 season. On 24 September 2016, Aksalu helped his team win the 2016 Finnish Cup by saving two penalties in a shootout against HJK in the final.

== International career ==
Aksalu has represented Estonia at under-16, under-17, under-20 and under-21 levels, amassing 20 youth appearances overall.

He made his senior international debut for Estonia on 17 October 2007, playing the first half of a friendly match against Montenegro, where he conceded the only goal of the game. In 2015, he succeeded Sergei Pareiko as Estonia's number one goalkeeper.

With the emergence of young Karl Hein, Aksalu was left out of the national team selection in 2020 and 2021. However, with the whole team's isolation due to COVID-19 in March 2021 and Hein's injury in November 2021, Aksalu was recalled to the national team to face Belgium and Czech Republic for the 2022 World Cup qualifiers.

== Career statistics ==
=== Club ===
As of match played 3 December 2023.

Appearances and goals by club, season and competition
Club	Season	League			Cup (Note: Includes the Estonian Cup, FA Cup and Finnish Cup)		League Cup (Note: Includes the Finnish League Cup)		Europe		Other		Total	
Club	Season	Division	Apps	Goals	Apps	Goals	Apps	Goals	Apps	Goals	Apps	Goals	Apps	Goals
Sörve	2000	Esiliiga	11	0			—		—		—		11	0
Sörve	2001	II liiga	16	0			—		—		—		16	0
Sörve	2002	II liiga	12	0			—		—		—		12	0
Sörve	Total		39	0			—		—		—		39	0
Kuressaare	2000	Meistriliiga	1	0	0	0	—		—		—		1	0
HÜJK Emmaste	2003	II liiga	10	0	0	0	—		—		—		10	0
Tervis Pärnu	2003	Esiliiga	7	0	1	0	—		—		2 (Note: Appearances in Esiliiga promotion play-offs)	0	10	0
Tervis Pärnu	2004	Esiliiga	15	0	1	0	—		—		—		16	0
Tervis Pärnu	2005	Esiliiga	7	0	0	0	—		—		—		7	0
Tervis Pärnu	Total		29	0	2	0	—		—		2	0	33	0
Flora	2003	Meistriliiga	1	0	0	0	—		0	0	0	0	1	0
Flora	2005	Meistriliiga	8	0	3	0	—		0	0	—		11	0
Flora	2006	Meistriliiga	15	0	2	0	—		0	0	1 (Note: Appearance in Estonian Supercup)	0	18	0
Flora	2007	Meistriliiga	30	0	0	0	—		2 (Note: Appearances in UEFA Cup/UEFA Europa League)	0	4 (Note: Appearances in Baltic League)	0	36	0
Flora	2008	Meistriliiga	30	0	2	0	—		2	0	2	0	36	0
Flora	2009	Meistriliiga	31	0	3	0	—		2	0	3 (Note: One appearance in Estonian Supercup, two appearances in Baltic League)	0	39	0
Flora	Total		115	0	10	0	—		6	0	10	0	141	0
Lelle	2004	II liiga	2	0	0	0	—		—		—		2	0
Flora II	2006	Esiliiga	6	0	0	0	—		—		—		6	0
Sheffield United	2009–10	Championship	0	0	0	0	0	0	—		—		0	0
Sheffield United	2010–11	Championship	0	0	0	0	0	0	—		—		0	0
Sheffield United	2011–12	League One	0	0	0	0	0	0	—		0	0	0	0
Sheffield United	Total		0	0	0	0	0	0	—		0	0	0	0
Mansfield Town (loan)	2010–11	Conference National	2	0	1	0	0	0	—		0	0	3	0
Flora II	2012	Esiliiga	1	0	0	0	—		—		—		1	0
Flora	2012	Meistriliiga	7	0	2	0	—		0	0	0	0	9	0
SJK	2013	Ykkönen	26	0	0	0	—		—		—		26	0
SJK	2014	Veikkausliiga	30	0	2	0	6	0	—		—		38	0
SJK	2015	Veikkausliiga	32	0	1	0	3	0	2	0	—		38	0
SJK	2016	Veikkausliiga	31	0	2	0	4	0	2 (Note: Appearances in UEFA Champions League)	0	—		39	0
SJK	2017	Veikkausliiga	32	0	6	0	—		2	0	—		40	0
SJK	2018	Veikkausliiga	18	0	6	0	—		—		—		24	0
SJK	2019	Veikkausliiga	15	0	2	0	—		—		—		17	0
SJK	Total		184	0	19	0	13	0	6	0	—		222	0
Paide Linnameeskond	2021	Meistriliiga	27	0	4	0	-		6	0	-		37	0
Paide Linnameeskond	2022	Meistriliiga	17	0	1	0	-		2	0	-		20	0
Paide Linnameeskond	2023	Meistriliiga	4	0	1	0	-		-		-		5	0
Paide Linnameeskond	Total		48	0	6	0	-		8	0	-		62	0
Total			444	0	40	0	13	0	20	0	12	0	529	0

=== International ===
As of match played 26 March 2019.

Appearances and goals by national team and year
National team	Year	Apps	Goals
Estonia
Estonia	2007	2	0
Estonia	2008	3	0
Estonia	2009	1	0
Estonia	2010	3	0
Estonia	2012	1	0
Estonia	2013	1	0
Estonia	2014	3	0
Estonia	2015	7	0
Estonia	2016	8	0
Estonia	2017	8	0
Estonia	2018	7	0
Estonia	2019	1	0
Estonia	2021	1	0
Total		46	0

== Honours ==
=== Club ===
Flora

- Estonian Cup: 2007–08, 2008–09
- Estonian Supercup: 2009

SJK

- Veikkausliiga: 2015
- Ykkönen: 2013
- Finnish Cup: 2016
- Finnish League Cup: 2014

=== Individual ===
- Baltic League Best Goalkeeper: 2007
- Veikkausliiga Player of the Month: May 2015
- Veikkausliiga Goalkeeper of the Year: 2015
- SJK Player of the Year: 2015
