= Gert Kams =

Estonian footballer

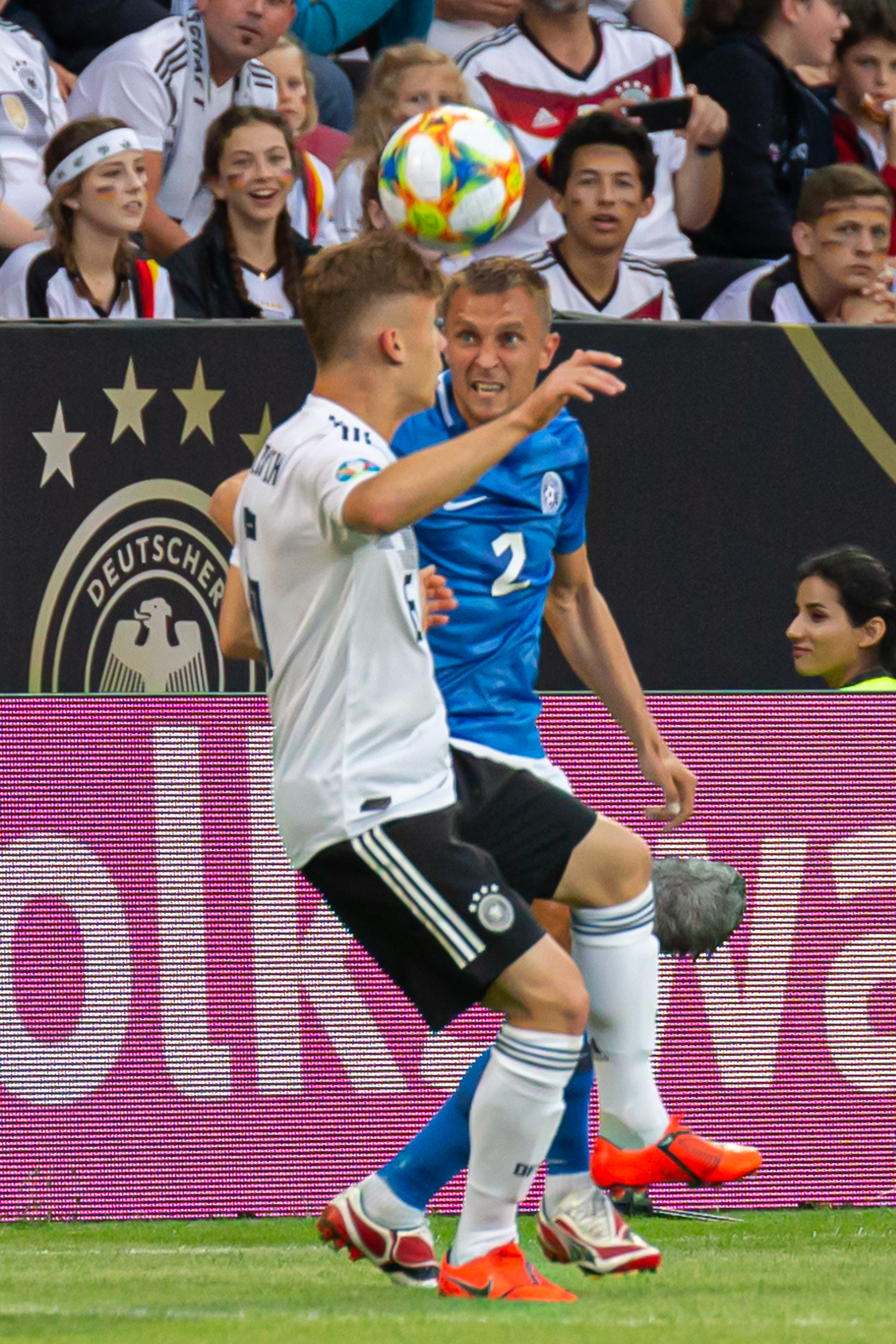
- Kams playing for Estonia in 2019

Personal information
- Full name: Gert Kams
- Date of birth: 25 May 1985 (age 41)
- Place of birth: Koeru, Estonia
- Height: 1.77 m (5 ft 9 1/2 in)
- Positions: Right back; winger

Youth career
- Kehtna
- –2004: FCF Järvamaa

Senior career*
| Years | Team | Apps | (Gls) |
| 2001–2004 | Koeru | 54 | (17) |
| 2004 | Ervita United | 2 | (7) |
| 2005 | Valga | 25 | (3) |
| 2006–2012 | Flora | 207 | (32) |
| 2006–2007 | Flora II | 12 | (10) |
| 2013–2014 | SJK | 52 | (7) |
| 2014 | Kerho 07 | 1 | (0) |
| 2014–2019 | Flora | 157 | (13) |
| 2017 | Flora U21 | 2 | (1) |
| Total | | 505 | (90) |

International career
| 2005 | Estonia U20 | 2 | (0) |
| 2006 | Estonia U21 | 2 | (0) |
| 2007–2019 | Estonia | 60 | (3) |

Managerial career
- 2019–: Paide Linnameeskond (sporting director)
- * Club domestic league appearances and goals

Gert Kams (born 25 May 1985) is a retired Estonian professional footballer who played as a right back. From 2019 he works as a sporting director for Paide Linnameeskond.

== Club career ==
=== Early career ===
Kams started out playing for hometown team Koeru before moving to Meistriliiga side Valga in 2005.

=== Flora ===
In 2006, Kams joined Meistriliiga club Flora. He helped Flora win two successive Meistriliiga titles in 2010 and 2011.

=== SJK ===
On 18 January 2013, Kams signed a two-year contract with Finnish club SJK. SJK won the 2013 Ykkönen and were promoted to the Veikkausliiga.

=== Return to Flora ===
On 27 October 2014, Kams rejoined his former club Flora. He was named as the club's captain ahead of the 2015 season. Kams went on to help Flora win Meistriliiga titles in the 2015 and 2017 seasons.

== International career ==
Kams has represented Estonia at under-20 and under-21 levels.

He made his senior international debut for Estonia on 3 February 2007, in a 0–4 loss to Poland in a friendly. Kams scored his first international goal on 29 February 2012, in a 2–0 friendly victory over El Salvador. It was an unconventional goal as the ball deflected off his back.

== Career statistics ==
=== Club ===
As of 1 January 2019.

| Club | Season | League | | | Cup (Note: Includes the Estonian Cup and Finnish Cup) | | League Cup (Note: Includes the Finnish League Cup) | | Europe | | Other | | Total | |
| Club | Season | Division | Apps | Goals | Apps | Goals | Apps | Goals | Apps | Goals | Apps | Goals | Apps | Goals |
|---|---|---|---|---|---|---|---|---|---|---|---|---|---|---|
| Koeru | 2001 | III liiga | 12 | 3 | — | | — | | — | | — | | 12 | 3 |
| Koeru | 2002 | III liiga | 14 | 3 | — | | — | | — | | — | | 14 | 3 |
| Koeru | 2003 | III liiga | 13 | 6 | — | | — | | — | | — | | 13 | 6 |
| Koeru | 2004 | III liiga | 15 | 5 | — | | — | | — | | — | | 15 | 5 |
| Koeru | Total | | 54 | 17 | — | | — | | — | | — | | 54 | 17 |
| Ervita United | 2004 | V liiga | 2 | 7 | — | | — | | — | | — | | 2 | 7 |
| Valga | 2005 | Meistriliiga | 25 | 3 | 3 | 0 | — | | — | | — | | 28 | 3 |
| Flora | 2006 | Meistriliiga | 21 | 5 | 2 | 0 | — | | 0 | 0 | 1 (Note: Appearance in Estonian Supercup) | 0 | 24 | 5 |
| Flora | 2007 | Meistriliiga | 28 | 3 | 2 | 3 | — | | 2 (Note: Appearance(s) in UEFA Cup/UEFA Europa League) | 0 | 2 (Note: Appearances in Baltic League) | 0 | 34 | 6 |
| Flora | 2008 | Meistriliiga | 36 | 5 | 4 | 1 | — | | 2 | 0 | 3 | 0 | 45 | 6 |
| Flora | 2009 | Meistriliiga | 25 | 4 | 4 | 0 | — | | 1 | 0 | 2 | 0 | 32 | 4 |
| Flora | 2010 | Meistriliiga | 35 | 6 | 4 | 0 | — | | 2 | 0 | 6 (Note: One appearance in Estonian Supercup, five appearances in Baltic League) | 0 | 47 | 6 |
| Flora | 2011 | Meistriliiga | 35 | 4 | 3 | 3 | — | | 2 (Note: Appearances in UEFA Champions League) | 0 | 4 (Note: Two appearances in Baltic Champions Cup, two appearances in Baltic League) | 0 | 44 | 7 |
| Flora | 2012 | Meistriliiga | 27 | 5 | 4 | 1 | — | | 0 | 0 | 1 | 0 | 32 | 6 |
| Flora | Total | | 207 | 32 | 23 | 8 | — | | 9 | 0 | 19 | 0 | 258 | 40 |
| Flora II | 2006 | Esiliiga | 10 | 8 | 0 | 0 | — | | — | | — | | 10 | 8 |
| Flora II | 2007 | Esiliiga | 2 | 2 | 0 | 0 | — | | — | | — | | 2 | 2 |
| Flora II | Total | | 12 | 10 | 0 | 0 | — | | — | | — | | 12 | 10 |
| SJK | 2013 | Ykkönen | 22 | 4 | 1 | 0 | — | | — | | — | | 23 | 4 |
| SJK | 2014 | Veikkausliiga | 30 | 3 | 2 | 0 | 4 | 0 | — | | — | | 36 | 3 |
| SJK | Total | | 52 | 7 | 3 | 0 | 4 | 0 | — | | — | | 59 | 7 |
| Kerho 07 | 2014 | Kakkonen | 1 | 0 | — | | — | | — | | — | | 1 | 0 |
| Flora | 2015 | Meistriliiga | 35 | 4 | 3 | 0 | — | | 2 | 0 | — | | 40 | 4 |
| Flora | 2016 | Meistriliiga | 31 | 3 | 5 | 1 | — | | 2 | 0 | 1 | 0 | 39 | 4 |
| Flora | 2017 | Meistriliiga | 26 | 0 | 0 | 0 | — | | 0 | 0 | 0 | 0 | 26 | 0 |
| Flora | 2018 | Meistriliiga | 34 | 3 | 2 | 0 | — | | 4 (Note: Two appearances in UEFA Champions League, two appearances and one goal in UEFA Europa League) | 1 | 0 | 0 | 40 | 4 |
| Flora | Total | | 126 | 10 | 10 | 1 | — | | 8 | 1 | 1 | 0 | 145 | 12 |
| Flora U21 | 2017 | Esiliiga | 2 | 1 | 0 | 0 | — | | — | | — | | 2 | 1 |
| Career total | | | 481 | 87 | 39 | 9 | 4 | 0 | 17 | 1 | 20 | 0 | 561 | 97 |

=== International ===
As of 19 July 2019.

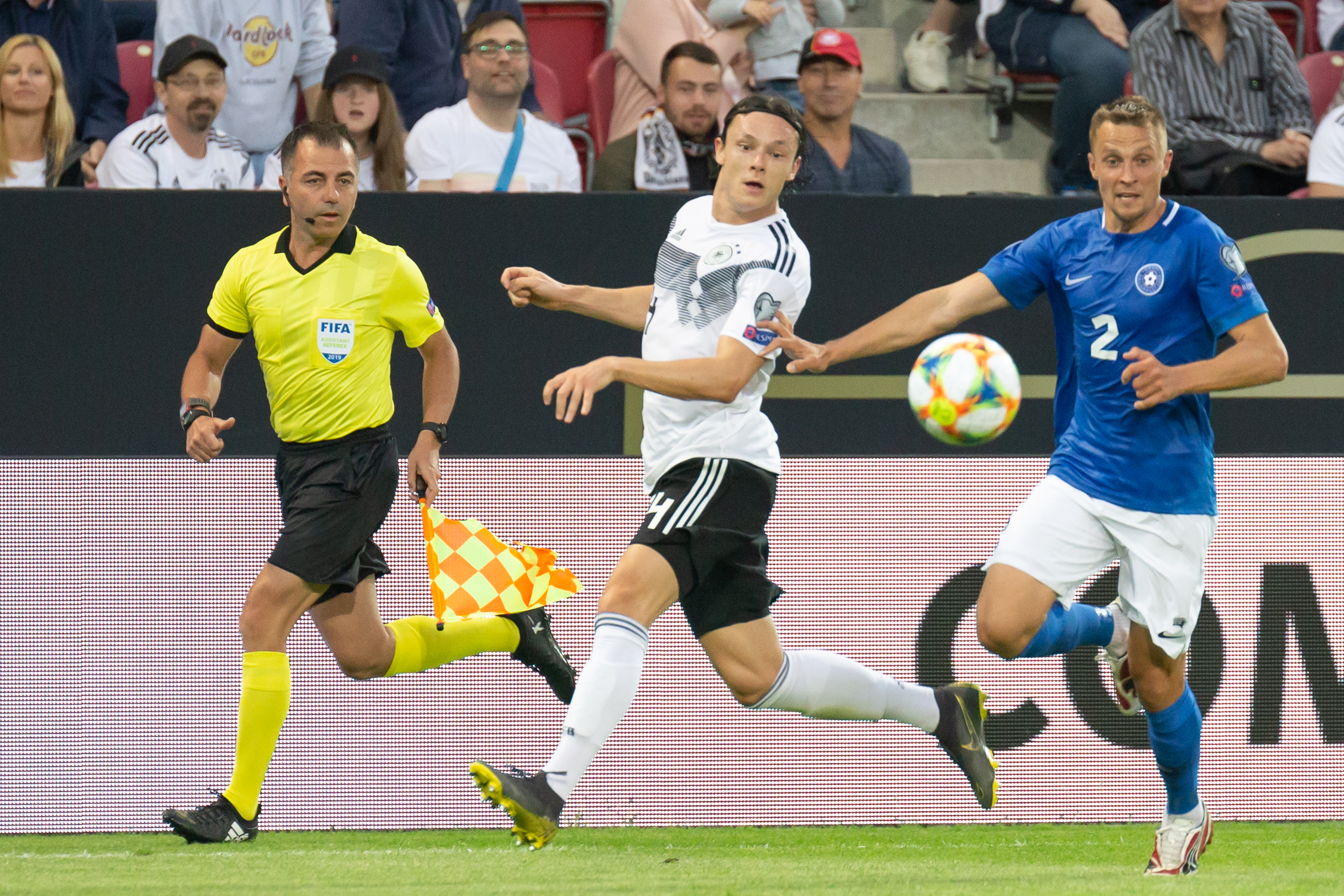
Kams (right) playing for Estonia against Germany in 2019.

| National team | Year | Apps | Goals |
|---|---|---|---|
Estonia
| Estonia | 2007 | 5 | 0 |
| Estonia | 2008 | 2 | 0 |
| Estonia | 2009 | 3 | 0 |
| Estonia | 2010 | 5 | 0 |
| Estonia | 2011 | 4 | 0 |
| Estonia | 2012 | 6 | 2 |
| Estonia | 2013 | 6 | 0 |
| Estonia | 2014 | 6 | 0 |
| Estonia | 2015 | 4 | 0 |
| Estonia | 2016 | 7 | 0 |
| Estonia | 2018 | 5 | 0 |
| Estonia | 2019 | 5 | 1 |
| Total | | 58 | 3 |

=== International goals ===
As of 19 July 2019. Estonia score listed first, score column indicates score after each Kams goal.

International goals by date, venue, cap, opponent, score, result and competition
| No. | Date | Venue | Cap | Opponent | Score | Result | Competition |
|---|---|---|---|---|---|---|---|
| 1 | 29 February 2012 | Los Angeles Memorial Coliseum, Los Angeles, United States | 20 | El Salvador | 2–0 | 2–0 | Friendly |
| 2 | 8 November 2012 | Sultan Qaboos Sports Complex, Muscat, Oman | 24 | Oman | 2–1 | 2–1 | Friendly |
| 3 | 11 January 2019 | Khalifa International Stadium, Doha, Qatar | 54 | Finland | 1–0 | 2–1 | Friendly |

== Honours ==
=== Club ===
Flora

- Meistriliiga: 2010, 2011, 2015, 2017, 2019
- Estonian Cup: 2007–08, 2008–09, 2010–11, 2015–16
- Estonian Supercup: 2009, 2011, 2012, 2016

SJK

- Ykkönen: 2013
- Finnish League Cup: 2014

=== Individual ===
- Meistriliiga Player of the Month: August 2016, August 2018
