= Wayne Brown (footballer, born 1988) =

English footballer

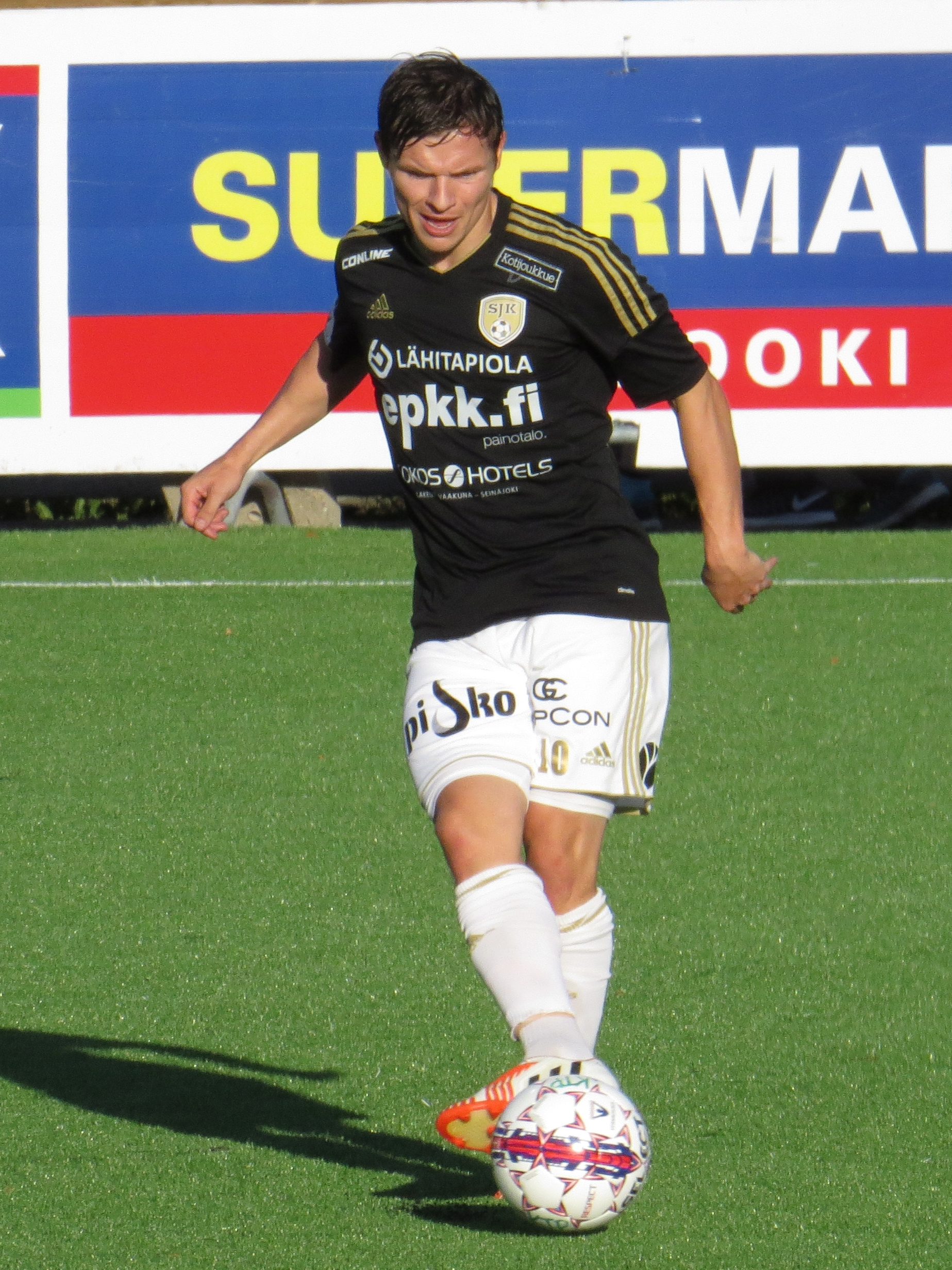

Personal information
- Full name: Wayne Jonathan Brown
- Date of birth: 6 August 1988 (age 38)
- Place of birth: Kingston upon Thames, England
- Position: Midfielder

Youth career
- 2002–2007: Fulham

Senior career*
Years	Team	Apps	(Gls)
2007–2010	Fulham	1	(0)
2008	→ Brentford (loan)	11	(1)
2009	→ TPS (loan)	26	(9)
2010	→ Bristol Rovers (loan)	4	(0)
2010–2012	Bristol Rovers	55	(3)
2013–2014	TPS	41	(8)
2014–2016	SJK	36	(2)
2016–2018	Newcastle Jets	42	(2)
2018–2021	Sutton United	15	(1)
2019	→ Walton Casuals (loan)	6	(1)
Total		237	(27)
- * Club domestic league appearances and goals as of 16:35, 22 May 2021 (UTC)

Wayne Jonathan Brown (born 6 August 1988) is an English former footballer who played as a midfielder.

He is a Fulham FC academy graduate starting at the club from 13 to 21 years old, making his way up through the ranks to the first team and to the Premier League. He had loan spells with Brentford, TPS and Bristol Rovers before joining the side permanently on a 2-year contract in May 2010. In December 2012 he signed a two-year contract with his former club TPS in the Finnish Veikkausliiga. A few months into his second season Brown joined Veikkausliiga side SJK. In May 2016, Brown signed with A-League club, the Newcastle Jets on a 2-year marquee contract.

== Club career ==
=== Fulham ===
Born in Kingston upon Thames, London, Brown is a midfielder that signed his first professional contract with Fulham. Brown made his first appearance for the club's first team in the FA Cup loss to Bristol Rovers on 22 January 2008. He signed a new contract with the Cottagers in January 2008 that kept him at the club until 2010 and he has been highly rated by Fulham reserve team manager Billy McKinlay, who tipped him to be a future star. He had a loan spell with Brentford towards the end of the 2007–08 season, making eleven League appearances and scoring his first ever league goal against Grimsby Town. Brown made his Premier-league debut for Fulham against Manchester United at Old Trafford on 18 February 2009, at the age of 21.

==== TPS Turku (loan) ====
In April 2009, he joined Finnish side TPS Turku on loan until 16 August 2009 through Roy Hodgson's Finnish connections. He scored for his new club three minutes into his league debut with a stunning 20-yard volley. On 31 July 2009, he converted a crucial 94th minuets winning penalty against Tampere United which kept TPS in the race for the championship.

Brown's loan with TPS Turku was extended until October to the end of the Finnish Premier League season. On 4 September 2009 he was named Player of the Month for August in the Veikkausliiga. In October he was named in the team of the season, followed by Midfielder of the Season and also collected the double award of Best Newcomer and Player of the Season in the Veikkausliiga. He scored 9 goals and 8 assist in 26 league appearances for TPS.

=== Bristol Rovers ===
On 1 February 2010, Brown joined League One side Bristol Rovers on a one-month loan deal. However, after making four appearances for the pirates, he was recalled by Fulham.

During the summer of 2010, Brown joined Bristol Rovers, initially on a two-year deal with a free transfer, and he went straight into the squad as a regular starting player, after he Impressed in his short loan spell. Wayne Brown made his debut on 7 August 2010, in a 3–0 defeat against Peterborough United. He made his home debut on 25 August 2010 in a 2–1 victory against local rivals Yeovil Town. He scored his first goal for Bristol Rovers in a 1–1 draw with Charlton Athletic at The Valley on 23 November 2010. In April, Brown scored in consecutive games for the Pirates in their 2–2 draw to Charlton and their 2–1 loss to Bournemouth.

In late-November, Brown rejected a new contract, and announced he was leaving the club in January and that he won the verge of returning to Finland.

=== TPS ===
After a four-year absence, Brown rejoined TPS Turku on a free transfer in his second spell, which kept him there until August 2014, In his first full season with the club, Brown made his debut in the Europa league qualification rounds and was linked with Thailand side Roi Et United at the end of the season but the move broke down in the final days. Brown made 30 appearances in his first season back at TPS and 10 appearances in his second season before moving to Veikkausliiga team SJk in June 2014.

=== SJK ===
In June 2014 Brown joined Finnish side SJK on a two-half-year contract. His contribution was immediate, as the team won seven games in a row, moving them up to second in the table behind Finnish champions Helsinki. His first season was a big success, with SJK finishing second and securing a Europe league place for the 2015 season. In his second season Brown played in both Europa league qualifying games and won the Finnish championship title with SJK, bringing Champions League football for the 2016 season. In March 2016 it was announced that Brown had left the team amidst rumours that he was considering moving to Australia.

=== Newcastle Jets ===
On 16 May 2016, Brown signed with A-League club Newcastle Jets. Brown made his professional debut against Melbourne Victory in the FFA Cup, chipping in an equalising goal during a game which ended in a 3–1 loss. He was only the 7th player in Jets history to score on their competitive debut. He made his A-League debut against Adelaide United on 9 October, scoring a solo goal from outside the box in a 1–1 draw. On 8 November, five rounds into the regular season, he signed a 1-year extension to his original 2-year contract, stating that he and his family had settled very happily in Australia.

=== Sutton United ===
Brown joined Sutton United in August 2018 after returning from a two-year stay in Australia. In December 2018, he suffered a serious knee injury which ruled him out for the rest of the campaign. He returned to action in November, scoring in a Surrey Senior Cup win over Horley. On 27 November 2019, he was loaned out to Walton Casuals for one month.

== Career statistics ==
As of match played 15 May 2021

Appearances and goals by club, season and competition
Club	Season	League			National Cup		League Cup		Europe		Other		Total	
Club	Season	Division	Apps	Goals	Apps	Goals	Apps	Goals	Apps	Goals	Apps	Goals	Apps	Goals
Fulham	2007–08	Premier League	0	0	1	0	0	0	―		―		1	0
Fulham	2008–09	Premier League	1	0	0	0	0	0	―		―		1	0
Fulham	Total		1	0	0	0	0	0	―		―		2	0
Brentford (loan)	2007–08	League Two	11	1	0	0	0	0	―		0	0	11	1
TPS (loan)	2009	Veikkausliiga	26	9	0	0	0	0	―		―		26	9
Bristol Rovers (loan)	2009–10	League One	4	0	0	0	0	0	―		0	0	4	0
Bristol Rovers	2010–11	League One	25	3	1	0	0	0	―		2 (Note: Appearances in Football League Trophy)	0	28	3
Bristol Rovers	2011–12	League Two	12	0	0	0	2	0	―		1	0	15	0
Bristol Rovers	2012–13	League Two	18	0	1	0	1	0	―		1	0	21	0
Bristol Rovers	Total		55	3	2	0	3	0			4	0	64	3
TPS	2013	Veikkausliiga	30	5	1	0	4	1	2 (Note: Appearances in UEFA Europa League)	0	―		37	6
TPS	2014	Veikkausliiga	11	3	1	0	0	0	―		―		12	3
TPS	Total		41	8	2	0	4	1	2	0	―		49	9
SJK	2014	Veikkausliiga	11	0	0	0	0	0	―		―		11	0
SJK	2015	Veikkausliiga	25	2	0	0	3	0	2	0	―		30	2
SJK	2016	Veikkausliiga	0	0	0	0	1	0	―		―		1	0
SJK	Total		36	2	0	0	4	0	2	0	―		42	2
Newcastle Jets	2016–17	A-League	22	2	0	0	―		―		―		22	2
Newcastle Jets	2017–18	A-League	20	0	1	0	―		―		―		16	0
Newcastle Jets	Total		42	2	1	0	―		―		―		38	2
Sutton United	2018–19	National League	14	1	2	0	―		―		2 (Note: Appearances in Scottish Challenge Cup)	0	18	1
Sutton United	2019–20	National League	1	0	0	0	—		―		0	0	1	0
Sutton United	2020–21	National League	0	0	0	0	—		―		0	0	0	0
Sutton United	Total		15	1	2	0	—		―		2	0	19	1
Walton Casuals (loan)	2019–20	Southern League Premier Division South	6	1	0	0	—		―		0	0	6	1
Career totals			237	27	8	0	11	1	4	0	6	0	261	28
