= Matti Lähitie =

Finnish footballer (born 1985)

Personal information
- Date of birth: 13 February 1985 (age 41)
- Place of birth: Pori, Finland
- Height: 1.79 m (5 ft 10 in)
- Position: Defender

Senior career*
Years	Team	Apps	(Gls)
2002–2004	FC Jazz	40	(2)
2005–2006	Lahti	10	(0)
2006	VPS Vaasa	6	(0)
2007–2010	JJK	68	(3)
2010	→ PoPa (loan)	4	(0)
2011–2013	SJK	60	(4)
2014–2017	JJK	59	(1)

Managerial career
- 2022: Finland U-21 (assistant)
- * Club domestic league appearances and goals

Matti Lähitie (born 13 February 1985) is a Finnish professional football coach and a former player. He played as a defender or defensive midfielder.

== Playing career ==
Lähitie started his football career at Finnish club FC Jazz, where he made his league debut at the age of just seventeen years old. In total he made forty appearances at FC Jazz between 2002 and 2004, scoring twice.

In 2005, he signed with FC Lahti who were playing in Veikkausliiga at the time. Lähitie saw this as a step-up in his career, with Finland internationals such as Jari Litmanen, Pekka Lagerblom and Mika Väyrynen also playing for Lahti.

In 2006 Lähitie moved to his third Finnish club, JJK playing in the Ykkönen.
