= Tony Björk =

Finnish footballer (born 1983)

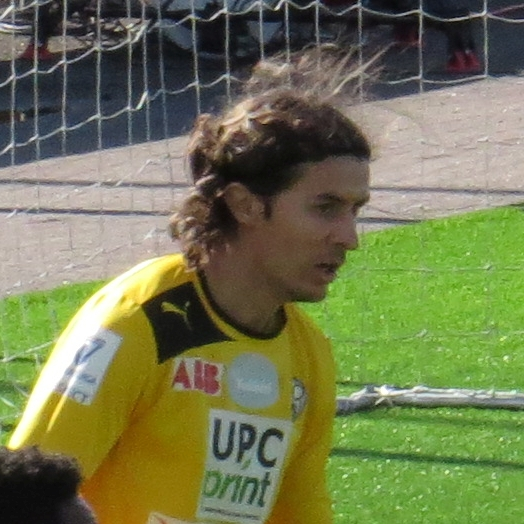

Personal information
- Date of birth: 25 October 1983 (age 43)
- Place of birth: Vaasa, Finland
- Height: 1.80 m (5 ft 11 in)
- Position: Midfielder

Team information
- Current team: Vasa IFK
- Number: 21

Senior career*
| Years | Team | Apps | (Gls) |
| 2002–2007 | Vasa IFK | 111 | (29) |
| 2008–2015 | Vaasan Palloseura | 186 | (14) |
| 2012 | → Vasa IFK (loan) | 1 | (0) |
| 2016– | Vasa IFK | 23 | (8) |
- * Club domestic league appearances and goals as of 14 May 2017 (UTC)

Tony Björk (born 25 October 1983) is a Finnish footballer who represents Vasa IFK of Kakkonen.
