= Felipe Aspegren =

Finnish footballer (born 1994)

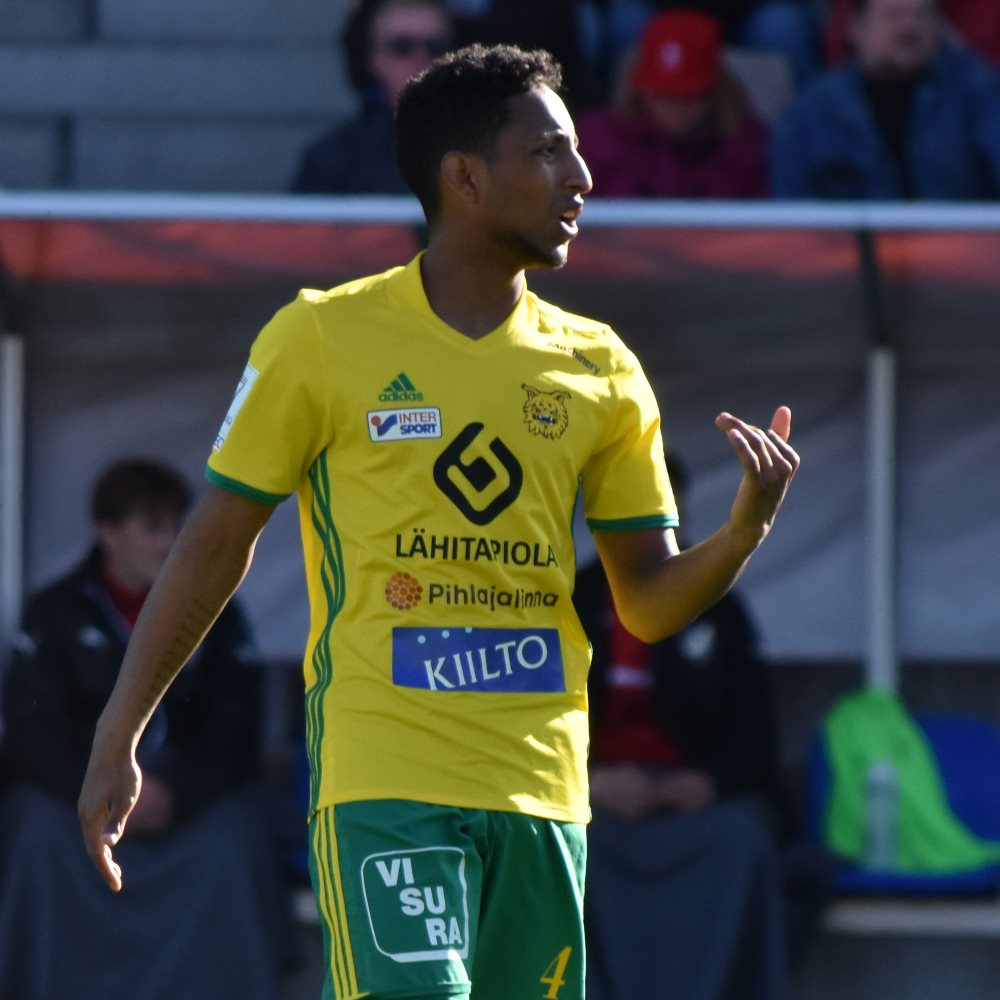
- Aspegren with Ilves in 2017

Personal information
- Full name: Andres Felipe Aspegren
- Date of birth: 12 February 1994 (age 32)
- Place of birth: Cali, Colombia
- Height: 1.73 m (5 ft 8 in)
- Position: Defender

Team information
- Current team: DPMM FC
- Number: 42

Youth career
- 2000–2011: HJK

Senior career*
| Years | Team | Apps | (Gls) |
| 2011–2013 | Klubi 04 | 37 | (3) |
| 2013 | Inter Turku | 22 | (0) |
| 2014 | SJK | 2 | (0) |
| 2014 | → TPS (loan) | 10 | (0) |
| 2015 | KTP | 32 | (0) |
| 2016–2021 | Ilves | 125 | (1) |
| 2021–2022 | KuPS | 13 | (0) |
| 2022 | SJK | 11 | (0) |
| 2023–2025 | Ilves | 42 | (1) |
| 2025 | → KTP (loan) | 9 | (0) |
| 2026– | DPMM | 7 | (0) |

International career^{‡}
| 2010 | Finland U16 | 3 | (0) |
| 2011 | Finland U17 | 5 | (0) |
| 2012 | Finland U18 | 18 | (0) |
| 2013 | Finland U19 | 1 | (0) |
| 2013−2015 | Finland U21 | 8 | (0) |
| 2023 | Finland | 1 | (0) |
- * Club domestic league appearances and goals as of 20 November 2026 ‡ National team caps and goals as of 9 January 2023

Andres Felipe Aspegren (born 12 February 1994) is a football player who plays for Malaysia Super League side DPMM FC. Born in Colombia, he has made one appearance for the Finland national team.

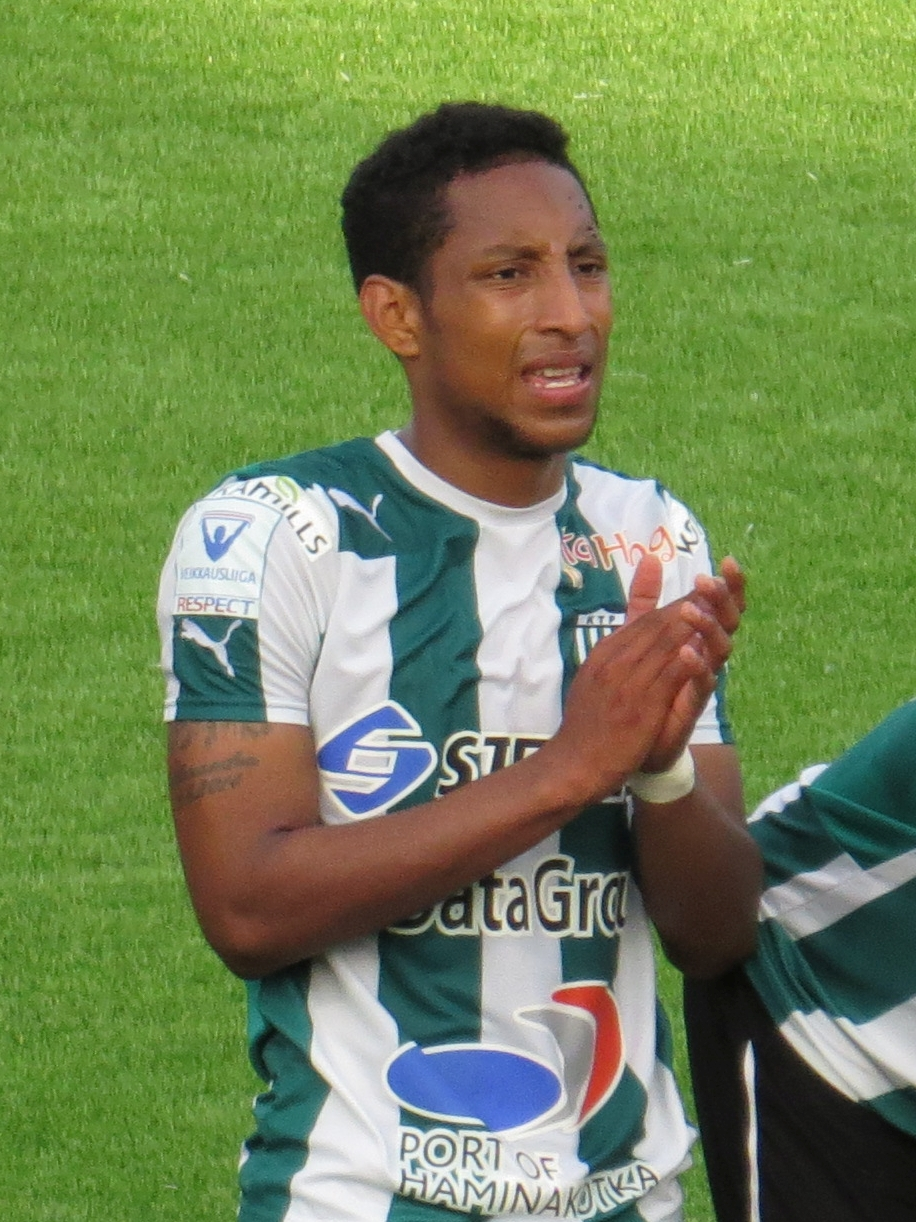
Aspegren with KTP in 2015

== Early life ==
Born in Cali, Colombia, at the age of six Aspegren and his younger brother Brayan were both adopted to a family from Helsinki, Finland.

== Club career ==
On 10 August 2021, he moved to KuPS until the end of the 2021 season with an option for 2022.

On 18 July 2022, Aspegren returned to SJK until the end of the season.

After the 2022 season, Aspergen returned to Ilves on a two-year deal. On 3 April 2024, he extended his deal with Ilves until the end of 2025 with a one-year option.

In July 2026, Aspegren signed for DPMM FC of the Malaysia Super League on a free transfer after a successful trial.

== International career ==
Aspegren represented Finland at various youth international levels. He made his full international debut with Finland senior national team on 9 January 2023, in a friendly match against Sweden.

== Career statistics ==
=== Club ===
As of 21 November 2026

Appearances and goals by club, season and competition
| Club | Season | League | | | National cup (Note: Includes Suomen Cup, Malaysia FA Cup) | | League cup (Note: Includes Finnish League Cup, Malaysia Cup) | | Europe | | Total | |
| Club | Season | Division | Apps | Goals | Apps | Goals | Apps | Goals | Apps | Goals | Apps | Goals |
|---|---|---|---|---|---|---|---|---|---|---|---|---|
| Klubi 04 | 2011 | Kakkonen | 16 | 0 | – | | – | | – | | 16 | 0 |
| Klubi 04 | 2012 | Kakkonen | 20 | 3 | 2 | 0 | – | | – | | 22 | 3 |
| Klubi 04 | 2013 | Kakkonen | 0 | 0 | 1 | 0 | – | | – | | 1 | 0 |
| Klubi 04 | Total | | 36 | 3 | 3 | 0 | 0 | 0 | 0 | 0 | 39 | 3 |
| HJK | 2012 | Veikkausliiga | 0 | 0 | 0 | 0 | 1 | 0 | 0 | 0 | 1 | 0 |
| HJK | 2013 | Veikkausliiga | 0 | 0 | 0 | 0 | 2 | 0 | 0 | 0 | 2 | 0 |
| HJK | Total | | 0 | 0 | 0 | 0 | 3 | 0 | 0 | 0 | 3 | 0 |
| Inter Turku | 2013 | Veikkausliiga | 29 | 0 | 0 | 0 | 0 | 0 | 2 (Note: Includes UEFA Europa League) | 0 | 31 | 0 |
| SJK | 2014 | Veikkausliiga | 2 | 0 | 2 | 0 | 3 | 0 | – | | 7 | 0 |
| TPS (loan) | 2014 | Veikkausliiga | 10 | 0 | – | | – | | – | | 10 | 0 |
| KTP | 2015 | Veikkausliiga | 32 | 0 | 1 | 0 | 3 | 0 | – | | 36 | 0 |
| Ilves | 2016 | Veikkausliiga | 27 | 1 | 1 | 0 | 4 | 0 | – | | 32 | 1 |
| Ilves | 2017 | Veikkausliiga | 27 | 0 | 5 | 0 | – | | – | | 32 | 0 |
| Ilves | 2018 | Veikkausliiga | 21 | 0 | 4 | 0 | – | | 2 | 0 | 27 | 0 |
| Ilves | 2019 | Veikkausliiga | 23 | 0 | 6 | 0 | – | | – | | 29 | 0 |
| Ilves | 2020 | Veikkausliiga | 20 | 0 | 5 | 0 | – | | 1 | 0 | 26 | 0 |
| Ilves | 2021 | Veikkausliiga | 7 | 0 | 3 | 1 | – | | – | | 10 | 1 |
| Ilves | Total | | 125 | 1 | 24 | 1 | 4 | 0 | 3 | 0 | 156 | 2 |
| KuPS | 2021 | Veikkausliiga | 11 | 0 | – | | – | | 2 (Note: Includes UEFA Europa Conference League) | 0 | 13 | 0 |
| KuPS | 2022 | Veikkausliiga | 2 | 0 | 2 | 0 | 3 | 0 | 0 | 0 | 7 | 0 |
| KuPS | Total | | 13 | 0 | 2 | 0 | 3 | 0 | 2 | 0 | 20 | 0 |
| KuPS Akatemia | 2022 | Kakkonen | 2 | 0 | – | | – | | – | | 2 | 0 |
| SJK | 2022 | Veikkausliiga | 11 | 0 | – | | – | | 2 | 0 | 13 | 0 |
| Ilves | 2023 | Veikkausliiga | 25 | 0 | 7 | 0 | 4 | 0 | – | | 36 | 0 |
| Ilves | 2024 | Veikkausliiga | 8 | 1 | 1 | 0 | 6 | 0 | 0 | 0 | 15 | 1 |
| Ilves | 2025 | Veikkausliiga | 9 | 0 | 0 | 0 | 5 | 0 | 1 | 0 | 15 | 0 |
| Ilves | Total | | 42 | 1 | 8 | 0 | 15 | 0 | 1 | 0 | 66 | 1 |
| KTP (loan) | 2025 | Veikkausliiga | 10 | 0 | – | | – | | – | | 0 | 0 |
| DPMM | 2026–27 | Malaysia Super League | 7 | 0 | 5 | 0 | 0 | 0 | – | | 12 | 0 |
| Career total | | | 310 | 5 | 45 | 1 | 31 | 0 | 10 | 0 | 396 | 6 |

=== International ===
As of match played 9 January 2023

Appearances and goals by national team and year
| National team | Year | Apps | Goals |
|---|---|---|---|
| Finland | 2023 | 1 | 0 |
| Total | | 1 | 0 |

== Honours ==
Ilves

- Finnish Cup: 2019, 2023
- Veikkausliiga runner-up: 2024

KuPS

- Finnish Cup: 2022

SJK

- Finnish League Cup: 2014

Individual

- Veikkausliiga Team of the Year: 2019
