= Jyri Hietaharju =

Finnish footballer (born 1981)

Personal information
- Date of birth: 23 April 1981 (age 45)
- Place of birth: Seinäjoki, Finland
- Height: 1.80 m (5 ft 11 in)
- Position: Midfielder

Senior career*
Years	Team	Apps	(Gls)
1998–2002	TP-Seinäjoki	84	(9)
1999	→ FC Santa Claus (loan)	5	(1)
2003–2011	VPS	146	(18)
2012–2024	SJK	136	(12)
Total		371	(40)
- * Club domestic league appearances and goals

Jyri Hietaharju (born 23 April 1981) is a Finnish former footballer.
