= Kalle Taimi =

Finnish footballer (born 1992)

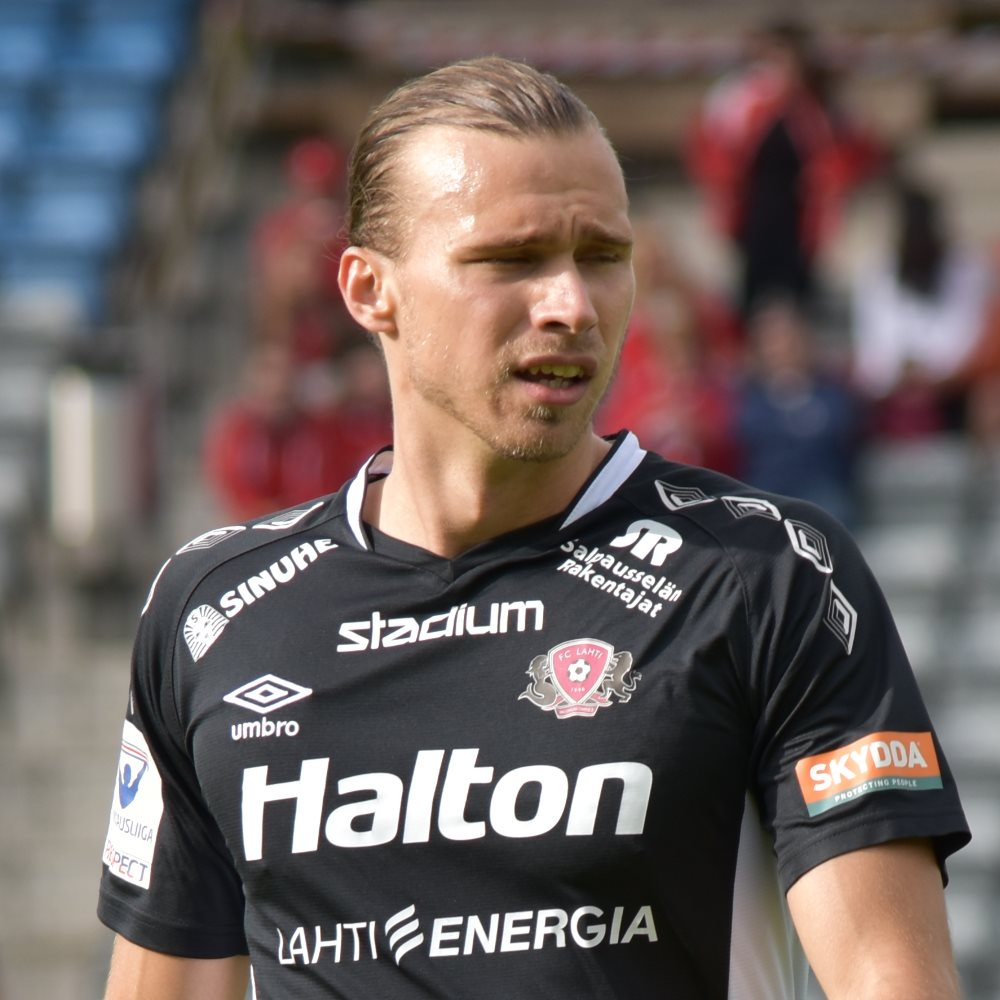

Personal information
- Date of birth: 27 January 1992 (age 34)
- Place of birth: Turku, Finland
- Height: 1.89 m (6 ft 2 in)
- Positions: Right-back; centre-back

Senior career*
Years	Team	Apps	(Gls)
2011–2014	SJK	26	(0)
2012	→ Kerho 07 (loan)		
2013	→ Kerho 07 (loan)	12	(1)
2014	→ Kerho 07 (loan)	20	(1)
2014	JIPPO	5	(0)
2015–2016	PS Kemi	45	(1)
2017–2018	Lahti	41	(1)
2019	KuPS	17	(0)
2020	IFK Mariehamn	22	(0)
2021–2022	TPS	28	(1)

International career
2018	Finland	2	(1)
- * Club domestic league appearances and goals as of 8 October 2022

Kalle Taimi (born 27 January 1992) is a Finnish international footballer who plays as a right-back or centre-back.

== Career ==
Born in Turku, Taimi has played for SJK, Kerho 07, JIPPO, PS Kemi and Lahti.

He made his international debut for Finland in 2018.

=== International goals ===
Scores and results list Finland's goal tally first..

No	Date	Venue	Opponent	Score	Result	Competition
1.	26 March 2018	Gloria Golf Resort Pitch A, Belek, Turkey	Malta	2–0	5–0	Friendly
