= Denis Abdulahi =

Finnish footballer (born 1990)

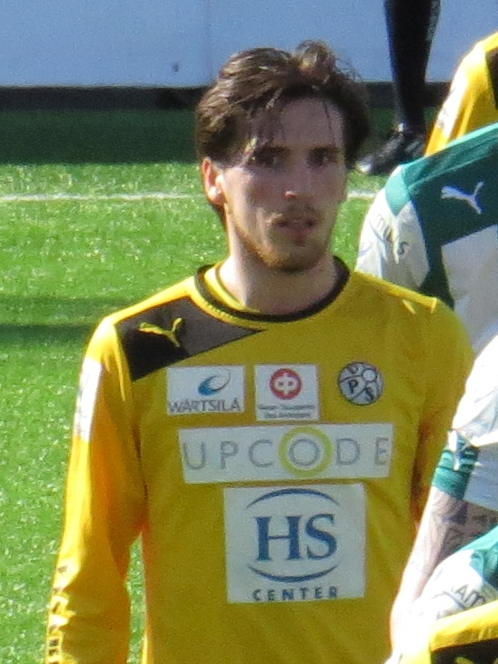
- Abdulahi with VPS in 2015

Personal information
- Full name: Denis Abdulahi
- Date of birth: 22 May 1990 (age 36)
- Place of birth: Kosovska Mitrovica, SFR Yugoslavia
- Height: 1.85 m (6 ft 1 in)
- Position: Midfielder

Youth career
- Hakunilan Riento
- Vantaa Akatemia
- AC Allianssi
- HJK

Senior career*
Years	Team	Apps	(Gls)
2009–2010	Viikingit	35	(5)
2010–2012	Örebro	7	(0)
2011	→ Víkingur (loan)	10	(0)
2012	→ VPS (loan)	30	(0)
2013	Viikingit	10	(0)
2014	MYPA	31	(6)
2015	VPS	16	(0)

International career
2010–2011	Finland U21	11	(1)
- * Club domestic league appearances and goals as of 13 May 2017 (UTC)

Denis Abdulahi (born 22 May 1990) is a former professional football player from Finland. His natural position was defense midfield, but he could play in other positions too. He retired after the 2015 season, at the age of 25.

== Early life ==
He was born on 22 May 1990 in Kosovska Mitrovica, SFR Yugoslavia.

== Career ==
=== FC Viikingit ===
On 16 May 2009, Abdulahi made his senior debut for the second-tier club. He showed immediate success in midfield. During the start year of 2010, he also made his international debut for Finland's U21 team.

=== Örebro SK ===
On 30 July 2010, Örebro SK announced that they had signed Abdulahi on a long-term contract. The lad had a trial with the club in the mid of June 2010 and the club decided to sign him after making a good trial. While signing for Örebro SK, he was described as a dynamic defense midfielder with great working capacity and much potential.

=== Vikingur Reykjavik ===
In the 2011 season Denis played against Knattspyrnufelag Vesturbæjar in the Visa Cup. Denis was sent off for head butting Arnar Smarason (AKA Kaiser) who was wearing a buff on the pitch. He received a 2 match ban for the incident.

== Career statistics ==
As of 1 September 2024.

Appearances and goals by club, season and competition
Club	Season	League			Cup		League Cup		Europe		Total	
Club	Season	Division	Apps	Goals	Apps	Goals	Apps	Goals	Apps	Goals	Apps	Goals
Viikingit	2009	Ykkönen	21	3	–		–		–		21	3
Viikingit	2010	Ykkönen	14	2	–		–		–		14	2
Viikingit	Total		35	5	0	0	0	0	0	0	35	5
Örebro	2010	Allsvenskan	4	0	0	0	–		–		4	0
Örebro	2011	Allsvenskan	3	0	0	0	–		–		3	0
Örebro	Total		7	0	0	0	0	0	0	0	7	0
Víkingur Reykjavik (loan)	2011	Úrvalsdeild	10	0	–		–		–		10	0
VPS (loan)	2012	Veikkausliiga	30	0	1	0	5	0	–		36	0
Viikingit	2013	Ykkönen	10	0	0	0	–		–		10	0
MYPA	2014	Veikkausliiga	31	6	1	0	4	0	4 (Note: Appearances in UEFA Europa League)	1	40	7
VPS	2015	Veikkausliiga	16	0	1	0	2	0	2	0	21	0
Career total			139	11	3	0	11	0	6	1	159	12
