= Luís Fernando (footballer, born 1979) =

Brazilian footballer

Personal information
- Date of birth: June 6, 1979 (age 47)
- Place of birth: Novo Horizonte, Brazil
- Height: 1.82 m (6 ft 0 in)
- Position: Goalkeeper

Senior career*
| Years | Team | Apps | (Gls) |
| 1997–2002 | Clube Atlético Bragantino | ? | (?) |
| 2005 | Associação Atlética Francana | ? | (?) |
| 2006 | Sepsi-78 | 25 | (1) |
| 2007–2010 | FC Viikingit | 57 | (0) |
| 2011–2014 | SJK | 52 | (0) |
| 2014 | → Kerho 07 | 11 | (0) |
- * Club domestic league appearances and goals as of 10 February 2016

Luís Fernando Lourenço "Luffe" da Silva (born June 6, 1979 in Brazil) is a retired football goalkeeper and current youth coach for SJK.

== Career ==
=== Club ===
In November 2010, Luís Fernando returned to Seinäjoki, signing for SJK.

=== Coaching ===
In November 2014, Luís Fernando became a youth coach for SJK following his retirement.

== Personal life ==
In March 2013, Luís Fernando received Finnish citizenship.

== Career statistics ==
As of match played 25 October 2014

Appearances and goals by club, season and competition
| Club | Season | League | | | National Cup | | League Cup | | Continental | | Total | |
| Club | Season | Division | Apps | Goals | Apps | Goals | Apps | Goals | Apps | Goals | Apps | Goals |
|---|---|---|---|---|---|---|---|---|---|---|---|---|
| SJK | 2011 | Kakkonen | 26 | 0 | 0 | 0 | – | | – | | 26 | 0 |
| SJK | 2012 | Ykkönen | 23 | 0 | 0 | 0 | – | | – | | 23 | 0 |
| SJK | 2013 | Ykkönen | 0 | 0 | 0 | 0 | – | | – | | 0 | 0 |
| SJK | 2014 | Veikkausliiga | 3 | 0 | 0 | 0 | – | | – | | 3 | 0 |
| SJK | Total | | 52 | 0 | 0 | 0 | 0 | 0 | - | - | 52 | 0 |
| Kerho 07 (loan) | 2014 | Kakkonen | 11 | 0 | 0 | 0 | – | | – | | 11 | 0 |
| Career total | | | 63 | 0 | 0 | 0 | 0 | 0 | - | - | 63 | 0 |
