= Kalle Kauppi (footballer) =

Finnish footballer (born 1992)

Personal information
- Date of birth: 6 May 1992 (age 34)
- Place of birth: Paimio, Finland
- Height: 1.86 m (6 ft 1 in)
- Position: Midfielder

Team information
- Current team: MaPS
- Number: 16

Youth career
- Inter Turku

Senior career*
Years	Team	Apps	(Gls)
2010–2019	Inter Turku	126	(5)
2011	→ TuTo (loan)	9	(3)
2015	→ Åbo IFK (loan)	2	(0)
2019–	Masku		

International career
- Finland U17
- Finland U19
2012	Finland U21	1	(0)
- * Club domestic league appearances and goals

Kalle Kauppi (born 6 May 1992) is a Finnish professional footballer who plays as a midfielder for Kolmonen club Masku.

== Career ==
Kauppi played for nine seasons for Inter Turku before joining fourth-tier Kolmonen club Masku in 2019.
