= Tero Taipale =

Finnish footballer (born 1972)

Personal information
- Date of birth: 14 December 1972 (age 53)
- Place of birth: Laihia, Finland
- Height: 1.78 m (5 ft 10 in)
- Position: Midfielder

Youth career
- Kimmo

Senior career*
Years	Team	Apps	(Gls)
1992–1993	SaNU	–	(–)
1994–1997	Santa Claus	74	(28)
1997–1998	RoPS	27	(0)
1998	→ Kanuunat (loan)	1	(0)
1998	IFK Mora	8	(7)
1999	Honka	27	(6)
2000	KuPS	26	(6)
2001–2002	Lahti	62	(4)
2003–2006	MyPa	95	(8)
2007–2008	VPS	30	(6)
2008	Kings Kuopio	0	(0)
2008	→ KuPS (loan)	19	(1)
2009–2016	KuPS	123	(1)
2011–2013	→ PK-37 (loan)	6	(1)
2014	→ KuFu-98 (loan)	12	(1)
2019	PK-37	0	(0)
2020	KuFu-98	1	(0)

International career
2006	Finland	1	(0)
- * Club domestic league appearances and goals as of 16 December 2020

Tero Taipale (born 14 December 1972) is a Finnish former football player.

After his retirement, Taipale has worked for KuPS as a youth coach and as sales and marketing manager.
