= Markus Kronholm =

Finnish footballer (born 1991)

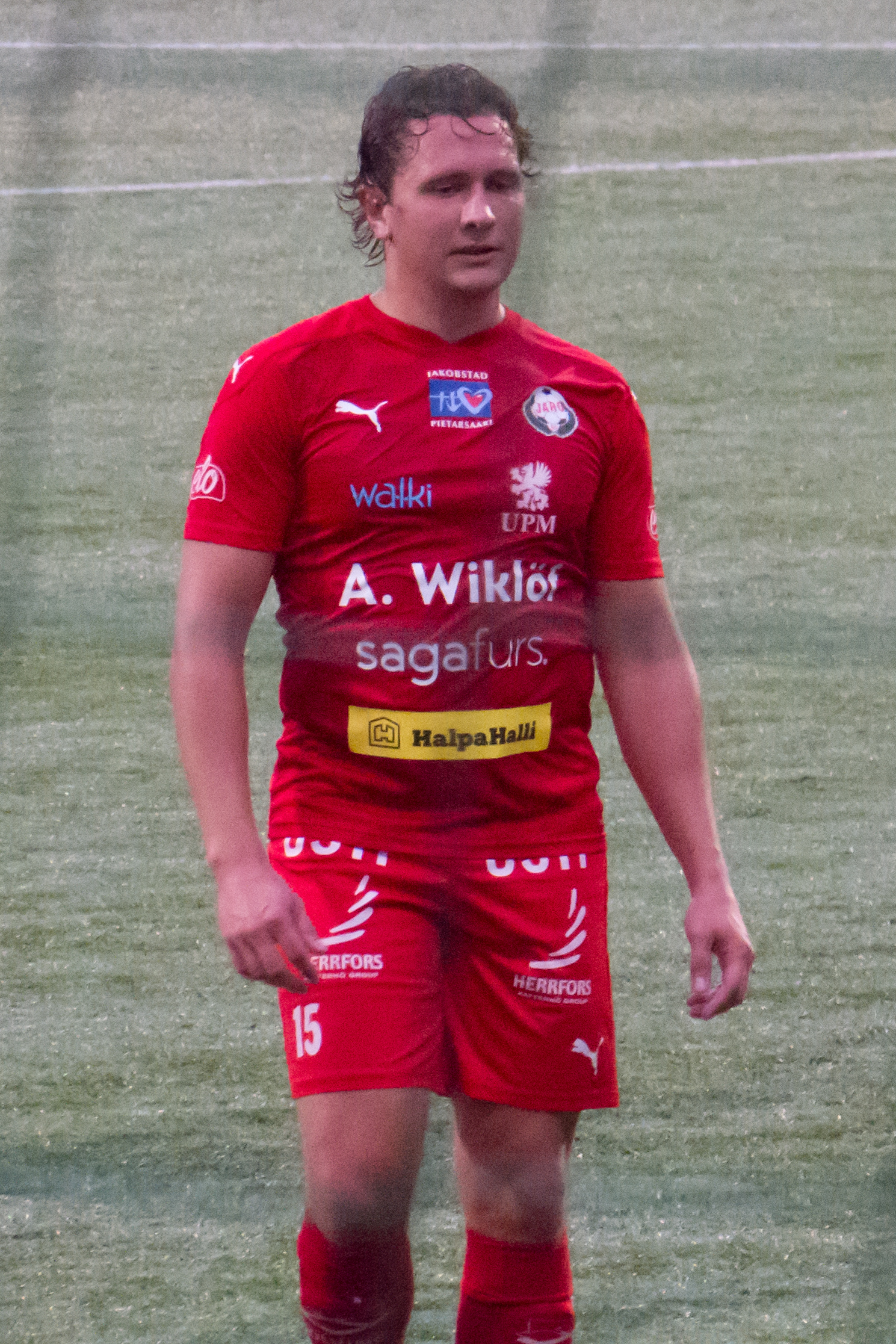
- Kronholm with Jaro in 2020

Personal information
- Date of birth: 2 April 1991 (age 35)
- Place of birth: Jakobstad, Finland
- Height: 1.71 m (5 ft 7 1/2 in)
- Position: Midfielder

Team information
- Current team: JBK
- Number: 15

Youth career
- Jaro

Senior career*
Years	Team	Apps	(Gls)
2008–2010	JBK	38	(4)
2010–2014	Jaro	128	(5)
2015	JBK	23	(8)
2016–2017	Jaro	51	(6)
2018–2019	JBK	28	(5)
2020–2024	Jaro	129	(10)
2025–	JBK	0	(0)
- * Club domestic league appearances and goals as of 27 October 2024

Markus Kronholm (born 2 April 1991) is a Finnish footballer who plays for Finnish club Jakobstads Bollklubb.

== Honours ==
Jaro

- Ykkösliiga runner-up: 2024
