= Marco Matrone =

Finnish footballer (born 1987)

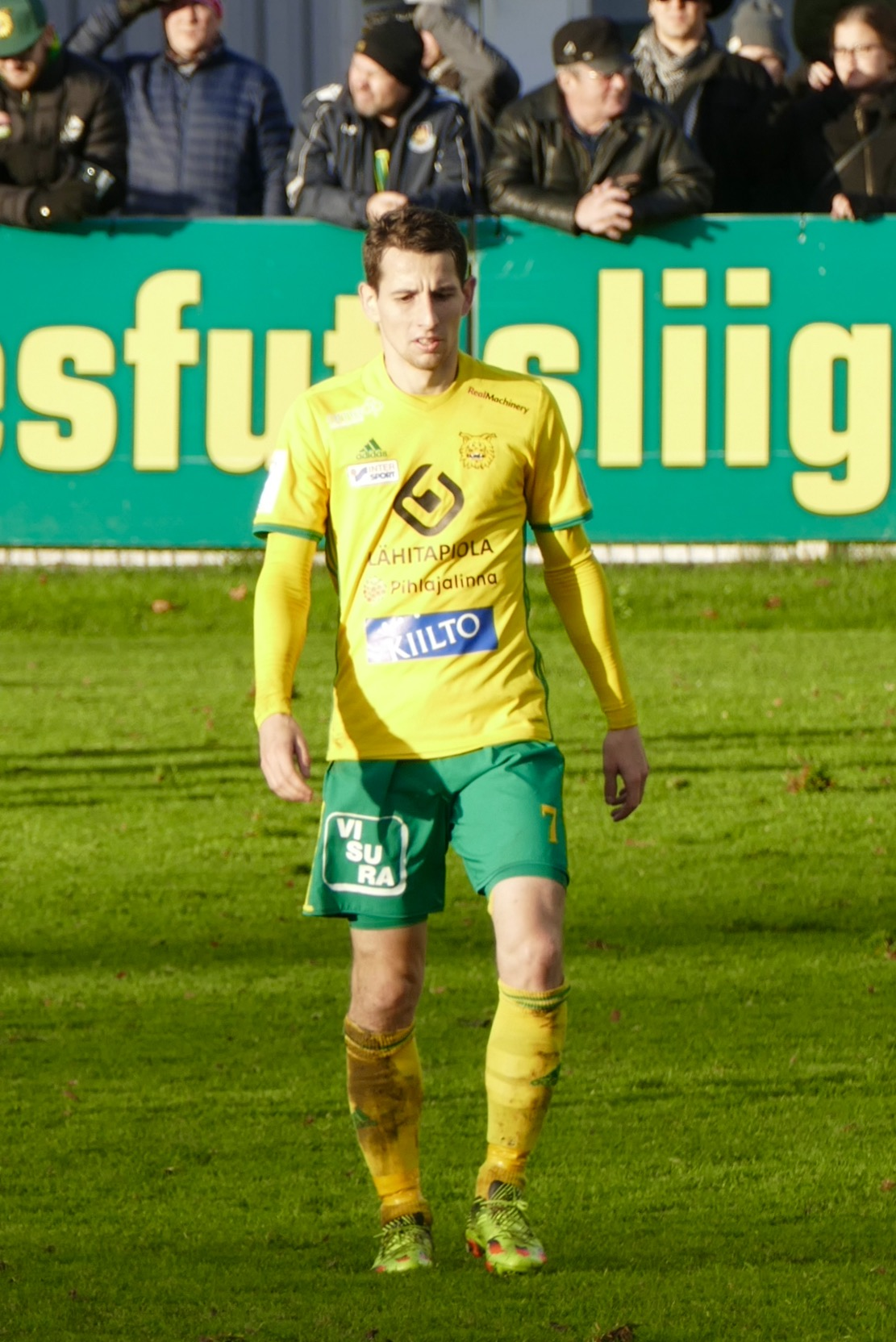

Personal information
- Date of birth: 2 July 1987 (age 39)
- Place of birth: Scafati, Italy
- Height: 1.82 m (6 ft 0 in)
- Position: Midfielder

Team information
- Current team: Ilves

Youth career
- –2004: FC Honka
- 2004–2005: AC Arezzo
- 2005: A.S.D. Sansepolcro Calcio

Senior career*
Years	Team	Apps	(Gls)
2006	FC Honka	0	(0)
2006	→ FC Espoo (loan)	5	(0)
2007–2010	FF Jaro	83	(4)
2011–2013	FC Haka	81	(0)
2014–2015	SJK	32	(0)
2016–	Ilves	0	(0)

International career
- Finland U-15
- Finland U-16
2008	Finland U-21	1	(0)
- * Club domestic league appearances and goals as of 3 November 2011

Marco Matrone (born 2 July 1987) is a Finnish footballer, who represents Ilves of Veikkausliiga, the Finnish premier division of football.

== Career ==
The midfielder has previously represented FC Honka, FF Jaro, FC Haka and SJK of Veikkausliiga, AC Arezzo of Serie B (mostly junior team), and Sansepolcro on a loan deal.

== International career ==
In March 2008, he was selected to the Finland national under-21 football team.

== Personal life ==
Matrone was born in Scafati, Italy, to a Finnish mother and an Italian father. He has dual citizenship of Finland and Italy.

Some sources have falsely claimed that he is related to Claudio Matrone, another Finnish-Italian footballer who was also born in the Naples region, but they are not related.
