= Steven Morrissey (footballer) =

Jamaican footballer (born 1986)

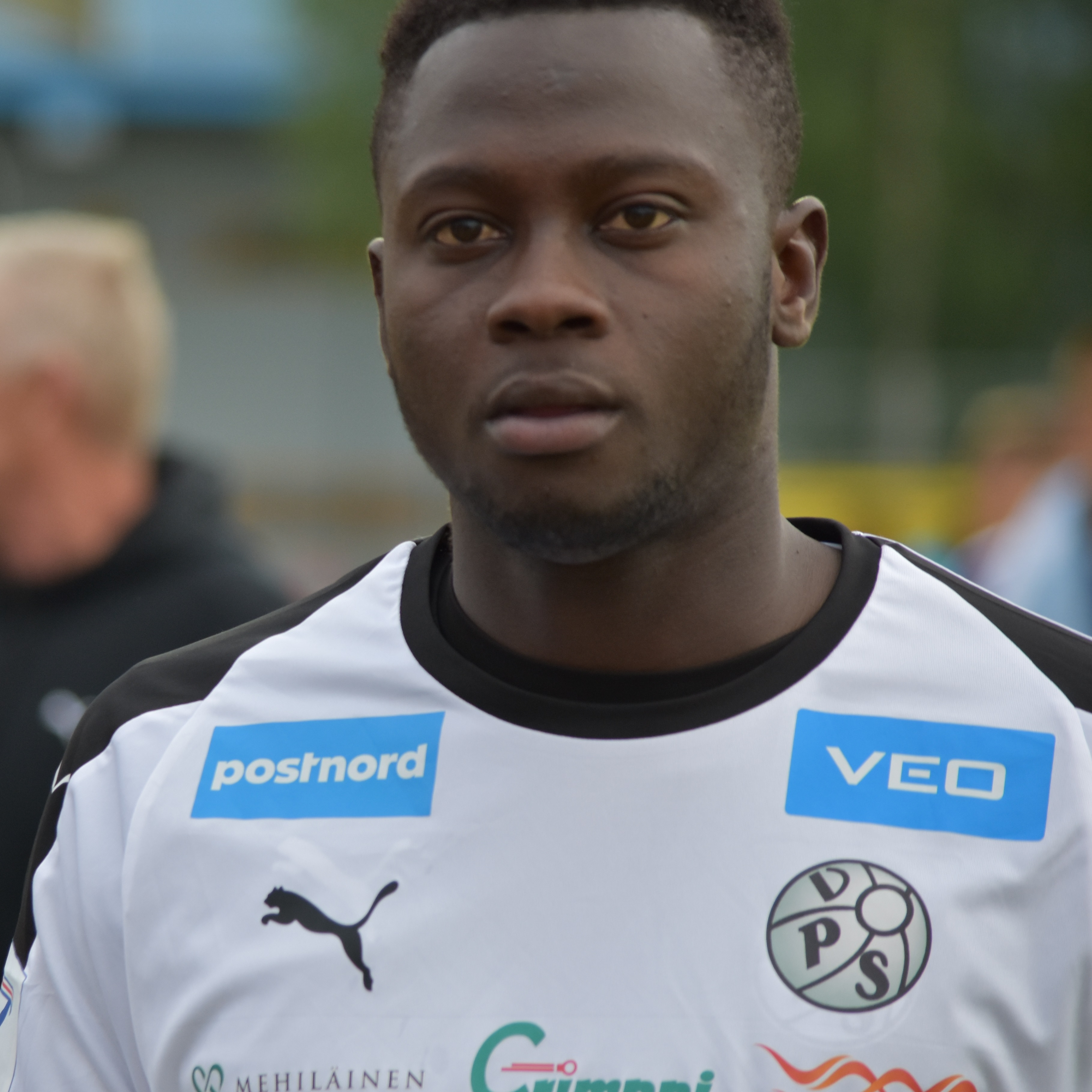
- Morrissey with VPS in 2018

Personal information
- Date of birth: 25 July 1986 (age 40)
- Height: 1.76 m (5 ft 9 in)
- Position: Forward

Team information
- Current team: VIFK

Senior career*
Years	Team	Apps	(Gls)
2005–2008	Harbour View		
2008–2011	Portmore United		(20)
2011	→ VPS (loan)	11	(4)
2012	VPS	28	(15)
2012–2013	Silkeborg	1	(0)
2013–2023	VPS	205	(46)
2024–	VIFK	8	(2)

International career
- Jamaica U17
- Jamaica U20
- * Club domestic league appearances and goals as of 09:06, 28 May 2024 (UTC)

Steven Morrissey (born 25 July 1986) is a Jamaican footballer who plays as a forward for Vasa IFK in Ykkönen.

== Career ==
In the 2012 season, while at VPS, Morrissey finished third in the top scorers chart in Veikkausliiga behind Irakli Sirbiladze of Inter Turku and Aleksei Kangaskolkka of IFK Mariehamn. He finished the season with 15 goals in 28 appearances. He scored a hat-trick against KuPS in May 2012.

In January 2013, Morrissey joined Danish Superliga club Silkeborg IF on a contract until the end of the year.

In December 2022 Morrissey agreed a one-year contract extension with VPS as part of which he also became coach in the club's academy. He left VPS at the end of the 2023 season and retired from professional football, along with former VPS teammate Sebastian Strandvall. He spent 13 seasons with the club. However, Morrissey signed with fellow Vaasa-based club VIFK for the 2024 season, competing in the third-tier Ykkönen.

== Honours ==
Harbour View

- Jamaica National Premier League: 2007, 2008
