= Severi Paajanen =

Finnish footballer (born 1986)

Personal information
- Date of birth: 23 October 1986 (age 40)
- Place of birth: Turku, Finland
- Height: 1.79 m (5 ft 10 1/2 in)
- Position: Midfielder

Senior career*
| Years | Team | Apps | (Gls) |
| 2004–2005 | VG-62 | | |
| 2006 | PP-70 | 23 | (1) |
| 2007–2014 | Inter Turku | 220 | (20) |
| 2015 | ÅIFK | 19 | (2) |
- * Club domestic league appearances and goals

Severi Paajanen (born 23 October 1986) is a Finnish former footballer.
