= Justin Moose =

American soccer player (born 1983)

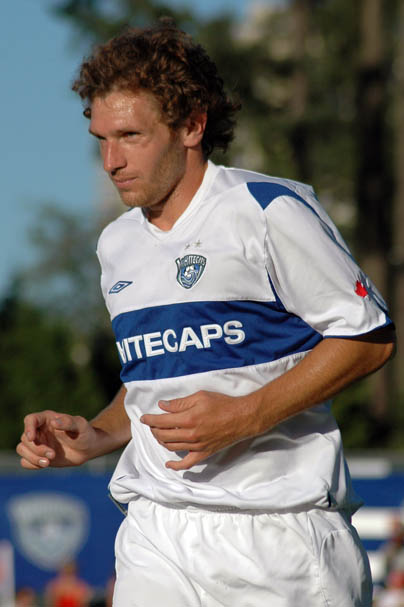

Personal information
- Full name: Justin Moose
- Date of birth: November 23, 1983 (age 42)
- Place of birth: Statesville, North Carolina, United States
- Height: 5 ft 8 in (1.73 m)
- Position: Midfielder

College career
Years	Team	Apps	(Gls)
2002–2005	Wake Forest Demon Deacons		

Senior career*
Years	Team	Apps	(Gls)
2004–2005	Carolina Dynamo	28	(16)
2006–2007	D.C. United	8	(0)
2008–2010	Vancouver Whitecaps	42	(1)
2011	Sriracha	4	(0)
2012–2014	SJK	79	(8)
2015–2016	Wilmington Hammerheads	52	(2)
- * Club domestic league appearances and goals as of September 25, 2016

Justin Moose (born November 23, 1983, in Statesville, North Carolina) is an American former professional soccer player.

== Career ==
=== College and amateur ===
Moose played college soccer at Wake Forest University from 2002 to 2005, where he was ACC Rookie of the Year and a NSCAA First Team All-American in 2004 and 2005. He had 29 in assists in his years at Wake Forest, an all-time record for the university. During his last two years at Wake Forest he also played in the USL Premier Development League with the Carolina Dynamo, earning Rookie of the Year honors in 2004.

=== Professional ===
Moose was selected in the first round, 7th overall, by D.C. United in the 2006 MLS SuperDraft. He played in eight Major League Soccer games for the team before being released at the end of 2007. He was briefly re-signed by D.C. in March 2008 to a developmental contract, but released not long after.

Following his release, he joined the Vancouver Whitecaps in the USL. On October 12, 2008, he helped the Whitecaps capture their second USL First Division Championship with the game winning assist against Puerto Rico Islanders 2–1 in Vancouver. On December 16, 2008, the Vancouver Whitecaps announced the re-signing of Moose for the 2009 season.

On February 4, 2011, it was announced that Moose had signed with Sriracha F.C. of the Thai Premier League. Moose then spent a stint in Finland with both HJK Helsinki and SJK.

Moose returned to the United States when he signed with USL Pro's Wilmington Hammerheads on January 9, 2015.

== Personal ==
Moose's brother Andrew plays guitar in a band he co-founded in Hickory, North Carolina. On occasion, Justin sits in on guitar and vocals.
