= Juho Lähde =

Finnish footballer (born 1991)

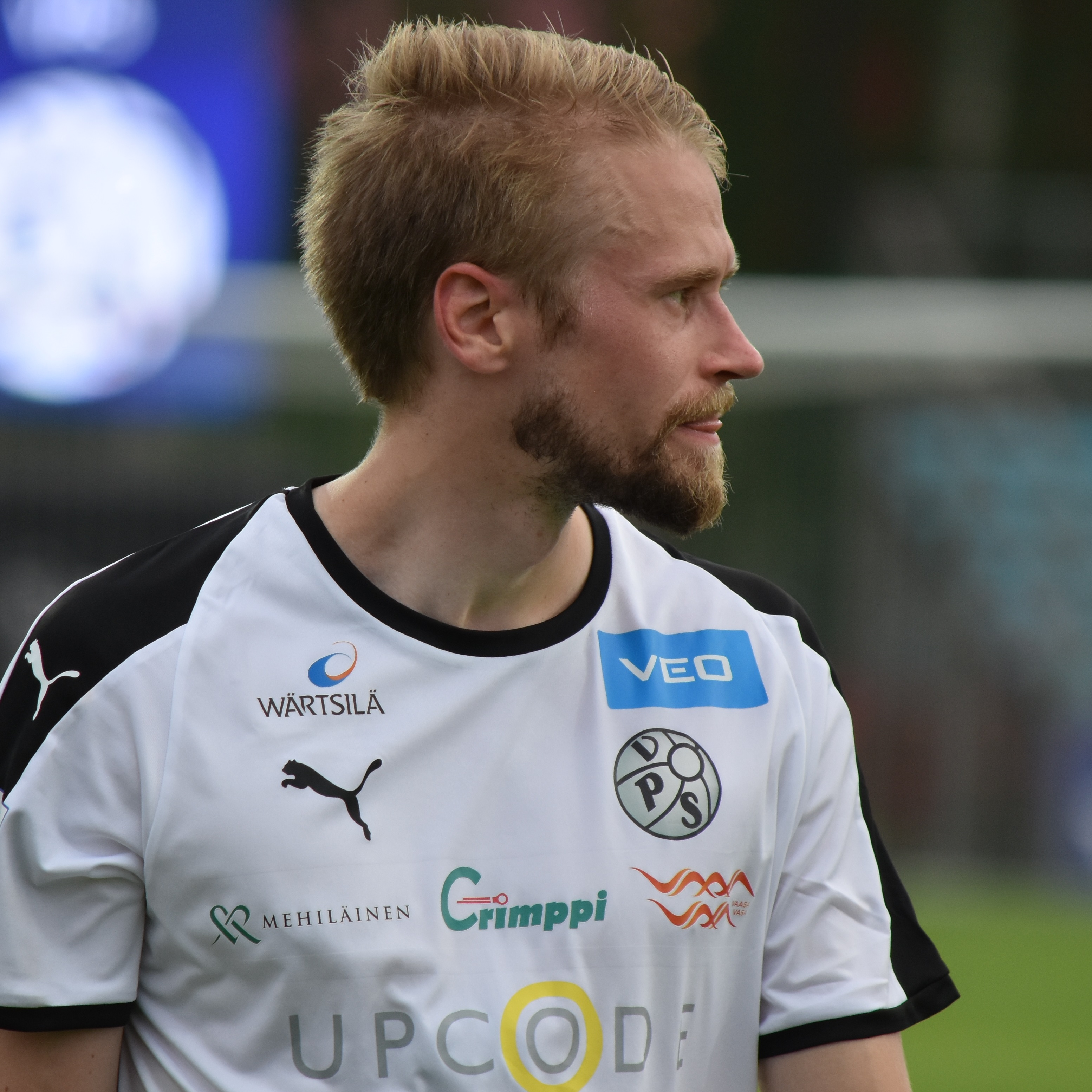
- Lähde with VPS in 2018.

Personal information
- Date of birth: 11 February 1991 (age 35)
- Place of birth: Turku, Finland
- Height: 1.75 m (5 ft 9 in)
- Position: Midfielder

Youth career
- TPS

Senior career*
Years	Team	Apps	(Gls)
2008–2013	TPS	94	(12)
2014–2015	SJK	34	(3)
2015	→ VPS (loan)	13	(1)
2016–2019	VPS	100	(13)
2020	TPS	11	(0)

International career
2011	Finland U19		
2010–2012	Finland U21	11	(1)
- * Club domestic league appearances and goals

Juho Lähde (born 11 February 1991) is a Finnish retired footballer.

== Career ==
=== Club career ===
On 1 August 2015, he joined VPS on loan from SJK until the end of the season. On 25 November 2015, Lähde then signed a two-year contract with VPS.

On 27 November 2019 TPS confirmed, that Lähde would return to the club on 1 January 2020, signing a deal until the end of 2021. 29-year-old Láhde retired at the end of the year.
