= Sebastian Strandvall =

Finnish footballer (born 1986)

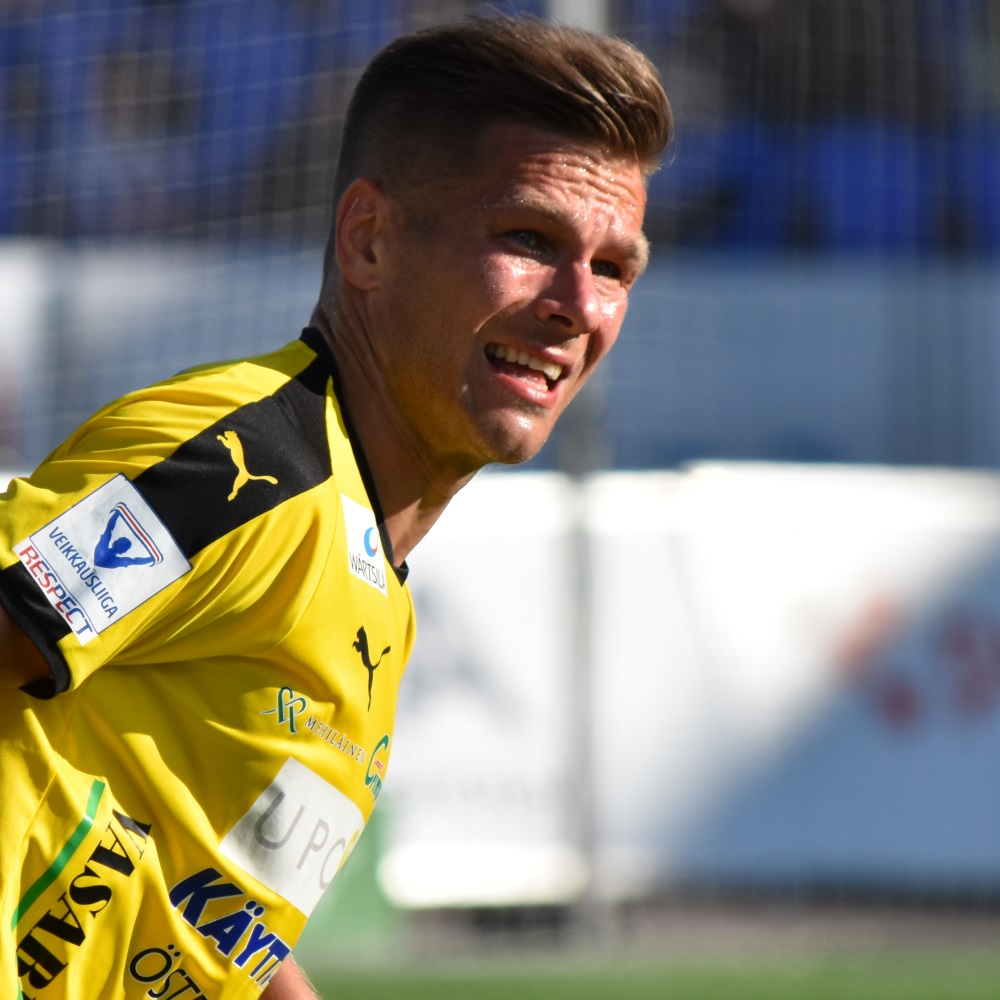
- Strandvall with VPS in 2018

Personal information
- Full name: Sebastian Gösta Alexander Strandvall
- Date of birth: 16 September 1986 (age 40)
- Place of birth: Vaasa, Finland
- Height: 1.80 m (5 ft 11 in)
- Position: Midfielder

Senior career*
Years	Team	Apps	(Gls)
2003–2006	VIFK	74	(19)
2007–2010	Haka	56	(10)
2010–2011	IFK Mariehamn	48	(9)
2012–2015	VPS	88	(14)
2015	Austria Lustenau	10	(1)
2015–2016	Rah Ahan Tehran	11	(1)
2016–2023	VPS	170	(38)
2019	VPS II	1	(0)
Total		457	(92)

International career
2007	Finland B	4	(0)
2014	Finland	2	(0)
- * Club domestic league appearances and goals

Sebastian Strandvall (born 16 September 1986) is a Finnish former professional footballer, who played as a midfielder. A former senior international for Finland, he was best known for representing VPS, but also played in Iranian Persian Gulf Pro League and Austria.

== Career ==
Strandvall left VPS at the end of the 2023 season and retired from playing, along with former VPS teammate Steven Morrissey. Strandvall has made 318 appearances in Finnish top-tier Veikkausliiga, scoring 56 goals.

== Outside football ==
In 2023, Strandvall made many efforts to prevent the execution of his Iranian friend teammate in Rah Ahan Tehran F.C. team, Amir Reza Nasr Azadani who was part of Mahsa Amini protests.

== Personal life ==
His brother Matias Strandvall is a cross-country skier at World Cup level, and his cousin Kevin Holmström is a member of music group KAJ.

== Career statistics ==
=== Club ===
As of 15 May 2024.

Appearances and goals by club, season and competition
Club	Season	League			Cup (Note: Includes Suomen Cup and Iranian Hazfi Cup)		League cup (Note: Includes Finnish League Cup)		Continental		Total	
Club	Season	Division	Apps	Goals	Apps	Goals	Apps	Goals	Apps	Goals	Apps	Goals
VIFK	2003	Kakkonen										
VIFK	2004	Kakkonen										
VIFK	2005	Kakkonen										
VIFK	2006	Ykkönen										
VIFK	Total		74	19	0	0	0	0	0	0	74	19
Haka	2007	Veikkausliiga	24	3	0	0	–		4 (Note: Includes UEFA Cup)	0	28	3
Haka	2008	Veikkausliiga	7	0	0	0	–		0	0	7	0
Haka	2009	Veikkausliiga	25	7	1	0	5	0	–		31	7
Haka	2010	Veikkausliiga	1	0	0	0	1	0	–		2	0
Haka	Total		57	10	1	0	6	0	4	0	68	10
IFK Mariehamn	2010	Veikkausliiga	18	2	–		–		–		18	2
IFK Mariehamn	2011	Veikkausliiga	30	7	2	0	2	1	–		34	8
IFK Mariehamn	Total		48	9	2	0	2	1	0	0	52	10
VPS	2012	Veikkausliiga	24	3	2	0	6	0	–		32	3
VPS	2013	Veikkausliiga	33	5	3	0	6	0	–		42	5
VPS	2014	Veikkausliiga	30	6	1	0	7	5	2 (Note: Includes UEFA Europa League)	1	40	12
VPS	Total		87	14	6	0	19	5	2	1	114	20
Austria Lustenau	2014–15	Austrian 2. Liga	10	1	–		–		–		10	1
Rah Ahan	2015–16	Persian Gulf Pro League	11	1	2	1	–		–		13	2
VPS	2016	Veikkausliiga	20	3	–		–		–		20	3
VPS	2017	Veikkausliiga	22	5	1	0	–		3	1	26	6
VPS	2018	Veikkausliiga	31	10	5	1	–		–		36	11
VPS	2019	Veikkausliiga	20	2	6	0	–		–		26	2
VPS	2020	Ykkönen	21	9	5	1	–		–		26	10
VPS	2021	Ykkönen	24	6	3	1	–		–		27	7
VPS	2022	Veikkausliiga	9	2	3	1	2	0	–		14	3
VPS	2023	Veikkausliiga	23	1	4	2	0	0	–		27	3
VPS	Total		170	38	27	6	2	0	3	1	202	45
Career total			457	92	38	6	29	6	9	2	533	106

=== International ===
As of match played 21 March 2024

Finland
Year	Apps	Goals
2014	1	0
Total	1	0

== Honours ==
Individual

- Veikkausliiga Player of the Month: May 2009
- Veikkausliiga Team of the Year: 2018
