= List of Finnish football transfers winter 2014–15 =

This is a list of Finnish football transfers in the winter transfer window 2014–15 by club. Only transfers of the Veikkausliiga and Ykkönen are included.

== Veikkausliiga ==
Note: Flags indicate national team as has been defined under FIFA eligibility rules. Players may hold more than one non-FIFA nationality.

=== FC Ilves ===
In:

No.	Pos.	Nation	Player
—	FW	NGA	Henry Chidozie (from (Finland) FC Haka)
—	MF	FIN	Eero Korte (from (Finland) FC Lahti)
—	DF	FIN	Antti Koskinen (from (Finland) MYPA)
—	DF	FIN	Jussi Kujala (from (Finland) KuPS)
—	DF	FIN	Samu Nieminen (from (Lithuania) FK Kruoja Pakruojis)

Out:

No.	Pos.	Nation	Player
—	FW	KOS	Berat Grabovci (to (Finland) FC Jazz)
—	FW	FIN	Vahid Hambo (to (Finland) FC Inter)
—	MF	FIN	Valtteri Uimonen (to (Finland) NoPS)

=== FC Inter ===
In:

No.	Pos.	Nation	Player
—	DF	MKD	Egzon Belica (from (North Macedonia) FK Shkëndija)
—	FW	FRA	Guy Gnabouyou (from (Malta) Sliema Wanderers)
—	FW	FIN	Vahid Hambo (from (Finland) FC Ilves)
—	DF	GRE	Petros Kanakoudis (from (Greece) PAE Kerkyra)
—	GK	FIN	Jukka Lehtovaara (from (Finland) TPS)
—	DF	CMR	Eric Matoukou (from (Belgium) Lierse)

Out:

No.	Pos.	Nation	Player
—	FW	FIN	Niclas Forss (to (Finland) Åbo IFK)
—	MF	HUN	Tamas Gruborovics (to (Finland) KTP)
—	GK	FIN	Jere Koponen (to (Finland) SJK)
—	DF	FIN	Mathias Lindström (to (Finland) Pargas IF)
—	MF	ESP	Francis Suárez (free transfer)
—	DF	SUI	Stefan Marinković (to (Slovakia) FK Dukla Banská Bystrica)
—	MF	BRA	Renan Oliveira (to (Brazil) Sampaio Correa)
—	FW	GEO	Irakli Sirbiladze (to (Finland) KuPS)

=== FC Lahti ===
In:

No.	Pos.	Nation	Player
—	MF	FIN	Jaakko Hietikko (loan return from (Finland) FC Jazz)
—	MF	FIN	Mikko Kuningas (from (Finland) PEPO)
—	MF	FIN	Pekka Lagerblom (from (Sweden) Ånge IF)
—	FW	FIN	Jussi Länsitalo (from (Germany) FSV 08 Bissingen)
—	DF	FIN	Simo Majander (from (Finland) MYPA)
—	FW	BRA	Leandro Motta (on loan from (Brazil) Fluminense)
—	FW	BRA	Matheus Alves (on loan from (Brazil) Fluminense)
—	MF	FIN	Aleksi Paananen (from (Finland) KuPS)
—	FW	FIN	Aleksi Ristola (from (Finland) MYPA)
—	FW	FIN	Mika Ääritalo (from (Finland) TPS)

Out:

No.	Pos.	Nation	Player
—	MF	FIN	Loorents Hertsi (to (Finland) VPS)
—	MF	FIN	Jaakko Hietikko (free transfer)
—	MF	FIN	Matti Klinga (to (Finland) HJK)
—	MF	FIN	Eero Korte (to (Finland) FC Ilves)
—	FW	CMR	Ariel Ngueukam (to (Finland) SJK)
—	MF	NED	Hafid Salhi (to (Netherlands) RKC Waalwijk)
—	DF	FIN	Jani Tanska (to (Sweden) Assyriska FF)

=== FF Jaro ===
In:

No.	Pos.	Nation	Player
—	MF	CAN	Jamar Dixon (from (Finland) JIPPO)
—	DF	CIV	Didier Kadio (from (Armenia) Shirak)
—	DF	GUY	Walter Moore (from (Kazakhstan) Astana-1964)
—	FW	FIN	Antti Palohuhta (loan return from (Finland) JBK)
—	DF	BRA	Reginaldo Junior (on loan from (Brazil) Fluminense)
—	MF	FIN	Joona Veteli (from (Finland) TP-47)
—	FW	FIN	Jani Virtanen (from (Finland) RoPS)

Out:

No.	Pos.	Nation	Player
—	DF	TRI	Aubrey David (to (Kazakhstan) FC Shakhter Karagandy)
—	FW	FIN	Iidle Elmi (to (Latvia) FB Gulbene)
—	DF	ARG	Carlos Fondacaro (to (Argentina) Tiro Federal)
—	MF	GER	Hendrik Helmke (to (Egypt) Al Ahly)
—	FW	FIN	Markus Kronholm (to (Finland) JBK)
—	FW	FIN	Antti Palohuhta (free transfer)
—	MF	FIN	Kevin Peth (to (Finland) Vasa IFK)
—	MF	FIN	Fredrik Svanbäck (to (Sweden) Höganäs BK)
—	MF	ARM	Alexander Tumasyan (free transfer)
—	GK	FIN	Ville Viljala (loan return to (Finland) SJK)

=== HIFK ===
In:

No.	Pos.	Nation	Player
—	DF	FIN	Tuomas Aho (from (Finland) MYPA)
—	FW	FIN	Jesse Ahonen (from (Finland) RoPS)
—	MF	FIN	Nnaemeka Anyamele (from (Finland) FC Honka)
—	MF	FIN	Jani Bäckman (from (Finland) PK-35)
—	GK	FIN	Carljohan Eriksson (from (Finland) Klubi 04)
—	MF	FIN	Otto-Pekka Jurvainen (from (Finland) PK-35 Vantaa)
—	FW	FIN	Joni Korhonen (from (Finland) PK-35)
—	MF	FIN	Fredrik Lassas (from (Finland) HJK)
—	FW	FIN	Youness Rahimi (from (Finland) HJK)
—	FW	FIN	Pekka Sihvola (from (Finland) MYPA)
—	DF	FIN	Tommi Vesala (from (Finland) MYPA)

Out:

No.	Pos.	Nation	Player
—	MF	FIN	Henri Jussila (to (Finland) PK Keski-Uusimaa)
—	FW	SWE	Jonathan Karlsson (free transfer)
—	DF	FIN	Marko Koskinen (to (Finland) IF Gnistan)
—	FW	FIN	Riku Oras (to (Finland) IF Gnistan)

=== HJK ===
In:

No.	Pos.	Nation	Player
—	FW	FIN	Samuel Haglund (from (Finland) KäPa)
—	DF	FIN	Aapo Halme (from (Finland) FC Honka)
—	FW	JPN	Mike Havenaar (from (Spain) Córdoba)
—	MF	FIN	Matti Klinga (from (Finland) FC Lahti)
—	MF	FRA	Guy Moussi (from (England) Birmingham)
—	MF	JPN	Atomu Tanaka (from (Japan) Albirex Niigata)
—	GK	FIN	Saku-Pekka Sahlgren (from (Finland) RoPS)
—	DF	FIN	Kalle Salmi (from (Finland) KäPa)
—	GK	FIN	Matias Sauramaa (from (Finland) PK-35)
—	DF	FIN	Leo Väisänen (from (Finland) KäPa)
—	GK	SWE	Daniel Örlund (from (Norway) Rosenborg)

Out:

No.	Pos.	Nation	Player
—	MF	GHA	Anthony Annan (to (Germany) TSV 1860 München)
—	FW	BFA	Aristide Bancé (to (Kazakhstan) FC Irtysh Pavlodar)
—	GK	ESP	Toni Doblas (to (Spain) UE Cornellà)
—	MF	TRI	Joevin Jones (loan return to (Trinidad and Tobago) W Connection)
—	FW	SEN	Macoumba Kandji (to (Saudi Arabia) Al-Faisaly FC)
—	MF	FIN	Fredrik Lassas (to (Finland) HIFK)
—	MF	FIN	Sebastian Mannström (to (Germany) SV Elversberg)
—	MF	FIN	Joel Perovuo (free transfer)
—	FW	FIN	Roni Porokara (free transfer)
—	FW	FIN	Youness Rahimi (to (Finland) HIFK)
—	MF	FIN	Teemu Tainio (retired)
—	GK	FIN	Ville Wallén (retired)

=== IFK Mariehamn ===
In:

No.	Pos.	Nation	Player
—	MF	KEN	Anthony Dafaa (from (Finland) VPS)
—	FW	FIN	Aleksei Kangaskolkka (from (Netherlands) Heracles Almelo)
—	MF	USA	Brian Span (from (United States) FC Dallas)
—	DF	SWE	Philip Sparrdal Mantilla (from (Sweden) Djurgårdens IF)
—	GK	FIN	Walter Viitala (from (Finland) FC Honka)

Out:

No.	Pos.	Nation	Player
—	MF	FIN	Tomas Hradecký (to (Finland) RoPS)
—	GK	SWE	Simon Nurme (retired)
—	FW	ARG	Luis Solignac (loan return to (Uruguay) C.A. Progreso)
—	GK	BIH	Vladimir Sudar (to (Sweden) IFK Luleå)
—	DF	CAN	Roger Thompson (to (Germany) KSV Baunatal)
—	MF	SWE	Robin Östlind (to (Sweden) Oskarshamns AIK)

=== KTP ===
In:

No.	Pos.	Nation	Player
—	DF	FIN	Nosh A Lody (from (Finland) MYPA)
—	FW	FIN	Sasha Anttilainen (from (Finland) MYPA)
—	DF	FIN	Felipe Aspegren (from (Finland) TPS)
—	DF	NED	Jordi van Gelderen (from (Finland) JJK Jyväskylä)
—	MF	HUN	Tamas Gruborovics (from (Finland) FC Inter)
—	FW	FIN	Juho Lehtonen (from (Finland) TPS)
—	DF	FIN	Joel Mero (on loan from (Germany) Borussia Mönchengladbach II)
—	GK	FIN	Jere Pyhäranta (from (Finland) MYPA)
—	DF	FIN	Juuso Salonen (from (Finland) FC Haka)
—	MF	FIN	Ilari Äijälä (from (Finland) FC Honka)

Out:

No.	Pos.	Nation	Player
—	FW	FIN	Jussi Aalto (loan return to (Finland) SJK)
—	GK	EST	Kert Kütt (to (Norway) Valdres FK)
—	MF	USA	Kevin Sawchak (to (United States) Atlanta Silverbacks)

=== KuPS ===
In:

No.	Pos.	Nation	Player
—	FW	USA	Freddy Adu (from (Serbia) FK Jagodina)
—	DF	CIV	Hamed Coulibaly (from Ivory Coast)
—	DF	SEN	Babacar Diallo (from (United States) Rochester Rhinos)
—	DF	FIN	Dani Hatakka (from (Finland) FC Honka)
—	DF	USA	Stephen McCarthy (from (United States) New England Revolution)
—	MF	FIN	Petteri Pennanen (from (Finland) RoPS)
—	MF	FIN	Patrick Poutiainen (from (Finland) FC Haka)
—	FW	GEO	Irakli Sirbiladze (from (Finland) FC Inter)

Out:

No.	Pos.	Nation	Player
—	DF	GAM	Omar Colley (to (Sweden) Djurgårdens IF)
—	DF	FIN	Jussi Kujala (to (Finland) FC Ilves)
—	MF	FIN	Aleksi Paananen (to (Finland) FC Lahti)
—	FW	EST	Ats Purje (to (Estonia) Nõmme Kalju)
—	MF	FIN	Jerry Voutilainen (to (Finland) VPS)

=== RoPS ===
In:

No.	Pos.	Nation	Player
—	GK	CAN	Tomer Chencinski (from (Israel) Maccabi Tel Aviv)
—	MF	FIN	Tommi Haanpää (from (Finland) PS Kemi)
—	MF	FIN	Tomas Hradecký (from (Finland) IFK Mariehamn)
—	FW	NGA	Michael Ibiyom (from Nigeria)
—	DF	GAM	Abdou Jammeh (from (Kuwait) Al-Fahaheel FC)
—	FW	CMR	Jean Fridolin Nganbe Nganbe (from (Finland) VPS)
—	MF	FIN	Juha Pirinen (from (Finland) MYPA)
—	FW	CRO	Vilim Posinković (from (Greece) Iraklis Psachna)
—	FW	FIN	Moshtagh Yaghoubi (from (Latvia) FK Spartaks Jūrmala)

Out:

No.	Pos.	Nation	Player
—	FW	FIN	Jesse Ahonen (to (Finland) HIFK)
—	DF	NGA	Ndukaku Udoka Alison (to (Finland) AC Kajaani)
—	GK	FIN	Oskari Forsman (to (Finland) TPS)
—	MF	GAM	Sainey Nyassi (to (Canada) FC Edmonton)
—	DF	FIN	Nicholas Otaru (to (Finland) FC Honka)
—	MF	FIN	Petteri Pennanen (to (Finland) KuPS)
—	DF	FIN	Antti Peura (to (Finland) AC Oulu)
—	GK	FIN	Saku-Pekka Sahlgren (to (Finland) HJK)
—	FW	FIN	Jani Virtanen (to (Finland) FF Jaro)

=== SJK ===
In:

No.	Pos.	Nation	Player
—	DF	FIN	Henri Aalto (from (Finland) FC Honka)
—	FW	FIN	Jussi Aalto (loan return from (Finland) FC KTP)
—	DF	FIN	Felipe Aspegren (loan return from (Finland) TPS)
—	MF	FIN	Mehmet Hetemaj (from (Italy) AlbinoLeffe)
—	GK	FIN	Jere Koponen (from (Finland) FC Inter)
—	FW	CMR	Ariel Ngueukam (from (Finland) FC Lahti)
—	MF	FIN	Jussi Vasara (from (Finland) FC Honka)
—	GK	FIN	Ville Viljala (loan return from (Finland) FF Jaro)

Out:

No.	Pos.	Nation	Player
—	FW	FIN	Jussi Aalto (to (Finland) TPS)
—	DF	FIN	Felipe Aspegren (to (Finland) KTP)
—	DF	EST	Gert Kams (to (Estonia) FC Flora)
—	MF	FIN	Tuomas Lähdesmäki (to (Finland) FC Haka)
—	MF	FIN	Matti Lähitie (to (Finland) JJK)
—	MF	USA	Justin Moose (to (United States) Wilmington Hammerheads)
—	FW	FIN	Juho Mäkelä (to (Finland) VPS)
—	DF	FIN	Timo Rauhala (to (Finland) KPV)
—	GK	BRA	Luís Fernando da Silva (retired)
—	MF	FIN	Aki Sipilä (to (Finland) KPV)
—	DF	ENG	Arinse Uade (free transfer)
—	GK	FIN	Ville Viljala (to (Finland) Ekenäs IF)

=== VPS ===
In:

No.	Pos.	Nation	Player
—	MF	FIN	Denis Abdulahi (from (Finland) MYPA)
—	MF	CIV	Charles Bantanga (from (Ivory Coast) Espoir de Koumassi)
—	MF	FIN	Loorents Hertsi (from (Finland) FC Lahti)
—	MF	KEN	Clifton Miheso (from (Kenya) Sofapaka)
—	FW	FIN	Juho Mäkelä (from (Finland) SJK)
—	FW	FIN	Pyry Soiri (from (Finland) MYPA)
—	MF	FIN	Eero Tamminen (from (Finland) TPS)
—	GK	FIN	Markus Uusitalo (from (Finland) FC Honka)
—	DF	FIN	Mikko Viitikko (from (Finland) Klubi 04)
—	MF	FIN	Jerry Voutilainen (from (Finland) KuPS)

Out:

No.	Pos.	Nation	Player
—	DF	FIN	Ilari Antila (to (Finland) Vasa IFK)
—	DF	JAM	Jordaan Brown (to (Norway) Flekkerøy IL)
—	GK	KEN	Anthony Dafaa (to (Finland) IFK Mariehamn)
—	MF	RSA	Cheyne Fowler (to (Finland) FC Haka)
—	GK	FIN	Janne Henriksson (to (Finland) Vasa IFK)
—	FW	FIN	Lasse Linjala (to (Finland) Vasa IFK)
—	FW	CMR	Jean Fridolin Nganbe Nganbe (to (Finland) RoPS)
—	DF	JAM	Keithy Simpson (to (Finland) AC Kajaani)
—	FW	VIN	Cornelius Stewart (to (Finland) PS Kemi)
—	MF	FIN	Sebastian Strandvall (to Austria Lustenau)
—	DF	FIN	Antti Uimaniemi (to (Finland) AC Oulu)

== Ykkönen ==
Note: Flags indicate national team as has been defined under FIFA eligibility rules. Players may hold more than one non-FIFA nationality.

=== AC Oulu ===
In:

No.	Pos.	Nation	Player
—	MF	KEN	Crispin Odula (from (Kenya) Bandari F.C.)
—	DF	FIN	Antti Peura (from (Finland) RoPS)
—	MF	FIN	Petteri Pietola (from (Finland) Klubi 04)
—	FW	FIN	Toni Tahvanainen (from (Finland) JIPPO)
—	DF	FIN	Antti Uimaniemi (from (Finland) VPS)
—	DF	FIN	Iiro Vandell (from (Finland) OPS)

Out:

No.	Pos.	Nation	Player
—	DF	FIN	Mika Nurmela (retired)
—	MF	CAN	Dominic Oppong (to (United States) Atlanta Silverbacks)
—	DF	FIN	Pekka Räisänen (to (Finland) OPS)
—	FW	FIN	Joonas Sohlo (to (Finland) OPS)

=== Ekenäs IF ===
In:

No.	Pos.	Nation	Player
—	FW	FIN	Lauri Bergström (from (Finland) Atlantis FC)
—	DF	FIN	Mergim Bushi (from (Finland) BK-46)
—	GK	FIN	Jonathan Jäntti (from (Finland) BK-46)
—	MF	FIN	Eetu Kolu (from (Finland) Ilves-Kissat)
—	FW	FIN	Casper Källberg (from (Finland) BK-46)
—	DF	FIN	Johannes Mononen (from (Finland) JIPPO)
—	MF	FIN	Samu Suoraniemi (from (Finland) JIPPO)
—	GK	FIN	Ville Viljala (from (Finland) SJK)

Out:

No.	Pos.	Nation	Player
—	FW	ARG	Matias Astrada (to (Finland) BK-46)
—	DF	FIN	Mikael Liespuu (to (Finland) TPS)
—	MF	ARG	Lucas Mondino (to (Finland) BK-46)

=== FC Haka ===
In:

No.	Pos.	Nation	Player
—	DF	RSA	Cheyne Fowler (from (Finland) VPS)
—	MF	FIN	Tuomas Lähdesmäki (from (Finland) SJK)

Out:

No.	Pos.	Nation	Player
—	FW	NGA	Henry Chidozie (to (Finland) FC Ilves)
—	MF	FIN	Ville Luokkala (to (Finland) GBK)
—	DF	FIN	Niko Markkula (to (Finland) JJK)
—	FW	FIN	Jarno Mattila (retired)
—	MF	FIN	Eetu Muinonen (to (Norway) Fram Larvik)
—	MF	FIN	Patrick Poutiainen (to (Finland) KuPS)
—	DF	FIN	Juuso Salonen (to (Finland) KTP)
—	MF	FIN	Teppo Syrjänen (loan to (Finland) TPV)

=== FC Jazz ===
In:

No.	Pos.	Nation	Player
—	MF	GAM	Saloum Faal (from (Senegal) Casa Sports)
—	FW	KOS	Berat Grabovci (from (Finland) FC Ilves)
—	DF	FIN	Jens Harju (from (Finland) JIPPO)
—	DF	FIN	Ville-Valtteri Starck (from (Finland) TPS)
—	MF	FIN	Sami Villanen (from (Finland) Turun Weikot)

Out:

No.	Pos.	Nation	Player
—	FW	CYP	Alekos Alekou (to (Greece) Chania)
—	DF	USA	Christopher Brundage (free transfer)
—	MF	GAM	Saloum Faal (released)
—	MF	CRO	Pëllumb Jusufi (to (North Macedonia) FK Renova)
—	DF	FIN	Juuso Laitinen (to (Estonia) FC Levadia)
—	MF	BRA	Diego Martins (to (Laos) Lane Xang Intra)
—	DF	GAM	Matthew Mendy (to (Finland) KPV)
—	MF	FIN	Jonas Nyholm (to (Finland) Pallo-Iirot)
—	FW	NGA	Stanley Ukwuoma (free transfer)

=== JJK ===
In:

No.	Pos.	Nation	Player
—	MF	FIN	Matti Lähitie (from (Finland) SJK)
—	DF	FIN	Niko Markkula (from (Finland) FC Haka)

Out:

No.	Pos.	Nation	Player
—	DF	NED	Jordi van Gelderen (to (Finland) FC KTP)
—	MF	FIN	Topi Järvinen (to (Norway) FK Mjølner)

=== MP ===
In:

No.	Pos.	Nation	Player
—	FW	USA	Harrison Hanley (from (United States) Santa Clara Broncos)
—	FW	FIN	Tommi Lankinen (from (Finland) KuFu-98)

Out:

No.	Pos.	Nation	Player

=== PK-35 ===
In:

No.	Pos.	Nation	Player

Out:

No.	Pos.	Nation	Player
—	MF	FIN	Jani Bäckman (from (Finland) HIFK)
—	FW	FIN	Otto-Pekka Jurvainen (to (Finland) HIFK)
—	FW	FIN	Joni Korhonen (to (Finland) HIFK)
—	DF	FIN	Patrick O'Shaughnessy (to (Finland) RiPS)
—	GK	FIN	Matias Sauramaa (to (Finland) HJK)

=== PS Kemi ===
In:

No.	Pos.	Nation	Player
—	FW	FIN	Juho-Teppo Berg (from (Sweden) Assi IF)
—	MF	POR	Kaby (on loan from (Poland) Pogoń Siedlce)
—	GK	FIN	Daniel Kollar (from (Finland) FC Honka)
—	DF	FIN	Juho Saarinen (from (Finland) FC Hämeenlinna)
—	FW	VIN	Cornelius Stewart (from (Finland) VPS)
—	DF	FIN	Kalle Taimi (from (Finland) SJK)
—	MF	FIN	Simon Thurling (from (Finland) Pallohonka)
—	MF	BEL	Washilly Tshibasu (from (Finland) KPV)
—	DF	FIN	Janne Turpeenniemi (from (Sweden) Bodens BK)

Out:

No.	Pos.	Nation	Player
—	DF	CAN	Jon Dollery (to (Australia) Heidelberg United)
—	MF	FIN	Tommi Haanpää (to (Finland) RoPS)
—	FW	BER	Jonte Smith (to (Norway) Flekkerøy IL)

=== TPS ===
In:

No.	Pos.	Nation	Player
—	FW	FIN	Hushyar Aftab (from (Finland) Åbo IFK)
—	GK	FIN	Oskari Forsman (from (Finland) RoPS)
—	MF	FIN	Oskari Jakonen (from (Finland) SalPa)
—	DF	FIN	Juri Kinnunen (from (Finland) FC Viikingit)
—	DF	FIN	Mikael Liespuu (from (Finland) Ekenäs IF)
—	MF	FIN	Ilari Mettälä (from (Finland) Pallo-Iirot)

Out:

No.	Pos.	Nation	Player
—	DF	FIN	Felipe Aspegren (loan return to (Finland) SJK)
—	MF	FIN	Jesper Brechtel (to (Germany) SC Hauenstein)
—	DF	USA	Alex DeJohn (to (Norway) IK Start)
—	FW	FIN	Juho Lehtonen (to (Finland) KTP)
—	GK	FIN	Jukka Lehtovaara (to (Finland) FC Inter)
—	FW	NOR	Joachim Osvold (loan return to (Norway) Lillestrøm SK)
—	DF	FIN	Ville-Valtteri Starck (to (Finland) FC Jazz)
—	MF	FIN	Eero Tamminen (to (Finland) VPS)
—	FW	FIN	Mika Ääritalo (to (Finland) FC Lahti)

=== Vasa IFK ===
In:

No.	Pos.	Nation	Player
—	DF	FIN	Ilari Antila (from (Finland) VPS)
—	GK	FIN	Janne Henriksson (from (Finland) VPS)
—	MF	FIN	Jesse Jääskeläinen (from (Finland) Kerho 07)
—	FW	FIN	Lasse Linjala (from (Finland) VPS)
—	MF	FIN	Kevin Peth (from (Finland) FF Jaro)

Out:

No.	Pos.	Nation	Player

== See also ==
- 2015 Veikkausliiga
- 2015 Ykkönen
