= List of Finnish football transfers summer 2014 =

This is a list of Finnish football transfers in the summer transfer window 2014 by club. Only transfers of the Veikkausliiga and Ykkönen are included.

== 2014 Veikkausliiga ==
Note: Flags indicate national team as has been defined under FIFA eligibility rules. Players may hold more than one non-FIFA nationality.

=== FC Honka ===
In:

No.	Pos.	Nation	Player
—	FW	FIN	Albinot Bekaj (from (Finland) FC Myllypuro)
—	MF	ESP	Yerai Couñago (from (Spain) CD Choco)
—	FW	FIN	Albert Kuqi (free agent)
—	DF	FIN	Kosta Manev (from (Finland) FC Viikingit)
—	DF	MNE	Milos Milovic (from (Montenegro) FK Mogren)

Out:

No.	Pos.	Nation	Player
—	FW	FIN	Roni Porokara (to (Finland) HJK Helsinki)

=== FC Inter ===
In:

No.	Pos.	Nation	Player
—	MF	BRA	Renan Oliveira (from (Brazil) ASA)

=== FC Lahti ===
In:

No.	Pos.	Nation	Player
—	MF	FIN	Xhevdet Gela (from (Poland) Widzew Łódź)

Out:

No.	Pos.	Nation	Player
—	FW	FIN	Jaakko Hietikko (on loan to (Finland) FC Jazz)
—	FW	FIN	Jussi Länsitalo (to (Germany) FSV 08 Bissingen)

=== FF Jaro ===
In:

No.	Pos.	Nation	Player
—	MF	FIN	Patrick Byskata (from (Finland) IFK Mariehamn)
—	MF	GER	Edgar Bernhardt (from (Poland) KS Cracovia)
—	GK	FIN	Ville Viljala (on loan from (Finland) SJK)

=== HJK ===
In:

No.	Pos.	Nation	Player
—	MF	GHA	Anthony Annan (from (Germany) Schalke 04)
—	FW	BFA	Aristide Bancé (from (Germany) FC Augsburg)
—	GK	ESP	Toni Doblas (from (Italy) Napoli)
—	MF	TRI	Joevin Jones (from (Trinidad and Tobago) W Connection)
—	MF	FIN	Joel Perovuo (from (Poland) Jagiellonia Białystok)
—	FW	FIN	Roni Porokara (from (Finland) FC Honka)
—	FW	FIN	Erfan Zeneli (from (Israel) Maccabi Petah Tikva)

Out:

No.	Pos.	Nation	Player
—	FW	FIN	Mikael Forssell (to (Germany) VfL Bochum)

=== IFK Mariehamn ===
In:

No.	Pos.	Nation	Player
—	DF	FIN	Kristian Kojola (from (Germany) Hallescher FC)
—	GK	BIH	Vladimir Sudar (from (Sweden) Umeå FC)

=== KuPS ===
In:

No.	Pos.	Nation	Player
—	MF	FIN	Juha Hakola (from (Cyprus) Aris Limassol)

=== MYPA ===
Out:

No.	Pos.	Nation	Player
—	MF	FIN	Valeri Minkenen (to (Finland) FC KTP)

=== RoPS ===
In:

No.	Pos.	Nation	Player
—	MF	FIN	Jesse Ahonen (from (Finland) FC Viikingit)

Out:

No.	Pos.	Nation	Player
—	MF	NGA	Emenike Mbachu (to (Malta) Naxxar Lions)
—	FW	FIN	Mika Lahtinen (to (Finland) FC Ilves)

=== SJK ===
In:

No.	Pos.	Nation	Player
—	FW	FIN	Juho Mäkelä (free agent)
—	DF	ENG	Arinse Uade (free agent)

Out:

No.	Pos.	Nation	Player
—	GK	FIN	Ville Viljala (to (Finland) FF Jaro)

=== TPS ===
In:

No.	Pos.	Nation	Player
—	DF	FIN	Niklas Friberg (on loan from (Finland) SalPa)
—	DF	FIN	Juri Kinnunen (from (Finland) FC Viikingit)
—	FW	NOR	Joachim Osvold (on loan from (Norway) Lillestrøm SK)

Out:

No.	Pos.	Nation	Player
—	FW	EST	Kevin Kauber (to (Slovenia) NK Krka)

=== VPS ===
In:

No.	Pos.	Nation	Player
—	DF	ENG	Jordaan Brown (from (England) Staines Town)

== 2014 Ykkönen ==
Note: Flags indicate national team as has been defined under FIFA eligibility rules. Players may hold more than one non-FIFA nationality.

=== AC Oulu ===
In:

No.	Pos.	Nation	Player
—	MF	FIN	Matias Ojala (loan return from (Germany) Hamburger SV)
—	FW	CMR	Didier Tayou (from (Malta) Mqabba FC)

=== FC Haka ===
In:

No.	Pos.	Nation	Player
—	FW	ESP	Carlos López (free agent)

Out:

No.	Pos.	Nation	Player
—	MF	FIN	Mika Jussila (to (Finland) MP)
—	MF	CIV	Venance Zézé (to France)

=== FC Ilves ===
In:

No.	Pos.	Nation	Player
—	FW	FIN	Vahid Hambo (from (Italy) Sampdoria U-20)
—	FW	FIN	Mika Lahtinen (from (Finland) RoPS)

Out:

No.	Pos.	Nation	Player
—	DF	HUN	Balazs Balogh (to (Hungary) Mezőkövesd-Zsóry SE)

=== FC Jazz ===
In:

No.	Pos.	Nation	Player
—	FW	FIN	Jaakko Hietikko (on loan from (Finland) FC Lahti)
—	DF	GAM	Matthew Mendy (from (Bangladesh) Feni SC)
—	FW	FIN	Samu-Petteri Mäkelä (from (Finland) MuSa)

Out:

No.	Pos.	Nation	Player
—	DF	FIN	Verneri Salminen (to (Finland) FC Santa Claus)

=== FC Viikingit ===
Out:

No.	Pos.	Nation	Player
—	FW	FIN	Jani Bäckman (to (Finland) PK-35 Vantaa)
—	GK	FIN	Mika Johansson (to (Finland) HIFK)
—	FW	FIN	Kasperi Liikonen (to (Finland) KTP)
—	DF	FIN	Mikko Lönnström (to (Finland) FC Futura)
—	DF	FIN	Kosta Manev (to (Finland) FC Honka)
—	FW	FIN	Fidan Seferi (to (Finland) PK-35 Vantaa)
—	MF	FIN	Niko Tirkkonen (to (Finland) Atlantis FC)

=== HIFK ===
In:

No.	Pos.	Nation	Player
—	DF	FIN	Patrick Aaltonen (free agent)

Out:

No.	Pos.	Nation	Player
—	DF	FIN	Marko Koskinen (on loan to (Finland) IF Gnistan)
—	MF	FIN	Kari Kuikka (to (Sweden) Mariehem SK)
—	FW	FIN	Kron Rexhepi (on loan to (Finland) JäPS)

=== JIPPO ===
In:

No.	Pos.	Nation	Player
—	GK	FIN	Mikko Ikonen (from (Finland) Kings)

=== JJK ===
In:

No.	Pos.	Nation	Player
—	DF	FIN	Teemu Vaarakallio (free agent)

=== KTP ===
In:

No.	Pos.	Nation	Player
—	MF	FIN	Valeri Minkenen (from (Finland) MYPA)

== See also ==
- 2014 Veikkausliiga
- 2014 Ykkönen
