= Antti Koskinen =

Antti Koskinen may refer to:

- Antti Koskinen (sport shooter)
- Antti Koskinen (footballer)
