= Petri Jakonen =

Finnish footballer (born 1967)

Personal information
- Date of birth: 9 June 1967 (age 59)
- Place of birth: Suolahti, Finland
- Height: 1.88 m (6 ft 2 in)
- Position: Goalkeeper

Youth career
- Salon Vilpas
- SalPa

Senior career*
| Years | Team | Apps | (Gls) |
| 1987–1988 | Reipas Lahti | 20 | (0) |
| 1989–1990 | HJK | 34 | (0) |
| 1991 | Helsingborg | 8 | (0) |
| 1992–1993 | TPS | 62 | (0) |
| 1994–1998 | MyPa | 131 | (0) |

International career
| 1988 | Finland U21 | 4 | (0) |
| 1990–1996 | Finland | 26 | (0) |

Managerial career
- 1999–2001: SalPa (sporting director)
- 2001–2003: TPS (sporting director)
- 2004–2009: TPS (CEO)
- * Club domestic league appearances and goals as of 1 May 2024

Petri Jakonen (born 9 June 1967) is a Finnish sports executive and a former professional footballer, who played as a goalkeeper. He was capped 26 times for Finland national football team during 1990–1996. Jakonen is currently working as the chief executive officer of Eerikkilä Sports Centre owned by the Finnish FA.

== Club career ==
Jakonen started his football career in Salo with Vilpas and SalPa.

He has played 247 matches in Finnish premier divisions Mestaruussarja and Veikkausliiga for Reipas Lahti, HJK Helsinki, TPS and MYPA, winning the Finnish championship title with HJK in 1990. While playing with MyPa, Jakonen was named the Veikkausliiga Best Goalkeeper in 1994, and won the Finnish Cup title in 1995. He also played briefly for Helsingborgs IF in Swedish second-tier.

== International career ==
Jakonen has made 26 appearances for Finland national team.

== Later career ==
Jakonen was one of the founding members of Jalkapallon Pelaajayhdistys (JPY, eng. The Football Players Association), and was the chairman of JPY during 1994–1996.

After his playing career, Jakonen worked as a sporting director of Salon Palloilijat (SalPa). On 8 October 2001, he was named the sporting director of Turun Palloseura (TPS). He was the CEO of TPS until 12 May 2009, when he started to work for Finnish FA as the director of top-level football. In 2011, Jakonen was partly responsible of the recruiting process of Mixu Paatelainen for the head coach position of Finland national team. Since 2013, Jakonen is the chief executive officer of Eerikkilän urheiluopisto (Eerikkilä Sports Centre). Since 2014, Jakonen has been a member of the boardroom of Urheiluopistot, and on 29 January 2021, he was named the chairman.

== Personal life ==
His sons Oskari Jakonen and Olli Jakonen are also professional football players for SalPa.

== Career statistics ==
=== Club ===
As of 1 September 2024.

Appearances and goals by club, season and competition
| Club | Season | League | | | Europe | | Total | |
| Club | Season | Division | Apps | Goals | Apps | Goals | Apps | Goals |
|---|---|---|---|---|---|---|---|---|
| Reipas Lahti | 1987 | Mestaruussarja | 17 | 0 | – | | 17 | 0 |
| Reipas Lahti | 1988 | Mestaruussarja | 3 | 0 | – | | 3 | 0 |
| Reipas Lahti | Total | | 20 | 0 | 0 | 0 | 20 | 0 |
| HJK | 1989 | Mestaruussarja | 25 | 0 | 2 (Note: Appearances in European Cup) | 0 | 27 | 0 |
| HJK | 1990 | Veikkausliiga | 9 | 0 | 0 | 0 | 9 | 0 |
| HJK | Total | | 34 | 0 | 2 | 0 | 36 | 0 |
| Helsingborg | 1991 | Division 1 | 8 | 0 | – | | 8 | 0 |
| TPS | 1992 | Veikkausliiga | 33 | 0 | 2 (Note: Appearances in UEFA Cup Winners' Cup) | 0 | 35 | 0 |
| TPS | 1993 | Veikkausliiga | 29 | 0 | – | | 29 | 0 |
| TPS | Total | | 62 | 0 | 2 | 0 | 64 | 0 |
| MYPA | 1994 | Veikkausliiga | 26 | 0 | 4 (Note: Appearances in UEFA Cup) | 0 | 30 | 0 |
| MYPA | 1995 | Veikkausliiga | 25 | 0 | 4 | 0 | 29 | 0 |
| MYPA | 1996 | Veikkausliiga | 26 | 0 | 3 | 0 | 29 | 0 |
| MYPA | 1997 | Veikkausliiga | 27 | 0 | 2 | 0 | 29 | 0 |
| MYPA | 1998 | Veikkausliiga | 27 | 0 | – | | 27 | 0 |
| MYPA | Total | | 131 | 0 | 13 | 0 | 144 | 00 |
| Career total | | | 255 | 0 | 17 | 0 | 272 | 0 |

=== International ===
As of 31 December 1996

Finland
| Year | Apps | Goals |
|---|---|---|
| 1990 | 2 | 0 |
| 1991 | 0 | 0 |
| 1992 | 0 | 0 |
| 1993 | 11 | 0 |
| 1994 | 8 | 0 |
| 1995 | 3 | 0 |
| 1996 | 2 | 0 |
| Total | 26 | 0 |

== Honours ==
HJK

- Veikkausliiga: 1990

MyPa

- Finnish Cup: 1995

Individual

- Veikkausliiga: Best Goalkeeper 1994
