= Mauro Severino =

Finnish footballer (born 1999)

Personal information
- Date of birth: 5 June 1999 (age 27)
- Place of birth: Buco-Zau, Angola
- Height: 1.63 m (5 ft 4 in)
- Position: Right winger

Youth career
- TPV
- TPS

Senior career*
Years	Team	Apps	(Gls)
2014–2015	TPV	15	(3)
2016–2018	TPS	3	(0)
2016–2018	→ SalPa (loan)	3	(1)
2018	Ilves	4	(0)
2018	Ilves II	1	(0)
2018	→ HJS (loan)	2	(1)
2019	HIFK	0	(0)
2019	TPV	13	(3)
2020	AC Kajaani	8	(1)
2020	Musan Salama	5	(0)
2021	Ilves-Kissat	19	(8)
2022–2024	Atlantis	63	(16)
2025–	Gilla FC	0	(0)

International career
2016	Finland U18	1	(0)
- * Club domestic league appearances and goals as of 2 April 2025

Mauro Severino (born 5 June 1999) is a Finnish fashion designer and footballer who plays as a right winger for Gilla FC.

== Career ==
Severino was born in Angola and moved to Finland with his family when he was nine years old.

After playing for TPV, TPS and Salon Palloilijat, Severino debuted in Veikkausliiga with Ilves in 2018. Later he has played for various Finnish clubs at lower levels of the Finnish football league system.

== Outside football ==
Severino has attended Muodin huipulle, the Finnish version of reality TV-show Project Runway, in 2024. He has designed clothes for Marimekko, and in 2022 he designed the customized jacket for Finnish pole vaulter Wilma Murto, to celebrate her winning the European championship title.

== Personal life ==
His twin brother Marcio is also a footballer.
