= Mikke Louhela =

Finnish footballer (born 1997)

Personal information
- Date of birth: 29 May 1997 (age 29)
- Place of birth: Finland
- Position: Midfielder

Team information
- Current team: SalPa
- Number: 4

Youth career
- Inter Turku

Senior career*
Years	Team	Apps	(Gls)
2015–2019	Inter Turku	2	(0)
2015	→ ÅIFK (loan)	5	(0)
2018	→ KaaPo (loan)	22	(5)
2020–	SalPa	80	(8)
- * Club domestic league appearances and goals as of 27 November 2023

Mikke Louhela (born 29 May 1997) is a Finnish professional footballer who plays for SalPa, as a midfielder.
