= Olli Jakonen =

Finnish footballer (born 2000)

Personal information
- Date of birth: 19 April 2000 (age 26)
- Place of birth: Salo, Finland
- Height: 1.87 m (6 ft 2 in)
- Position: Forward

Team information
- Current team: SalPa
- Number: 20

Youth career
- –2019: SalPa

Senior career*
Years	Team	Apps	(Gls)
2018–2019	Salon Wilpas	12	(5)
2019–2020	SalPa	31	(10)
2021	EIF	18	(6)
2022	TPS	28	(11)
2023	Inter Turku	0	(0)
2023	Inter Turku II	5	(2)
2023	→ SalPa (loan)	11	(3)
2024	SalPa	27	(11)
2025–2026	VPS	21	(4)
2026–	SalPa	27	(14)
- * Club domestic league appearances and goals as of 7 November 2026

Olli Jakonen (born 19 April 2000) is a Finnish professional footballer who plays as a forward for Ykkönen club SalPa.

== Career ==
On 5 April 2025, Jakonen made his Veikkausliiga debut with VPS. He scored his first Veikkausliiga goal on 25 May, in a 2–0 away win against KuPS.

== Personal life ==
His brother Oskari is also a football player for SalPa. Their father Petri Jakonen is a former Finnish international footballer and a current Finnish sport executive.

== Career statistics ==
As of 27 July 2026

Appearances and goals by club, season and competition
Club	Season	League			National cup (Note: Includes Suomen Cup)		League cup (Note: Includes Ykkönen Cup, Finnish League Cup and Ykkösliigacup)		Total	
Club	Season	Division	Apps	Goals	Apps	Goals	Apps	Goals	Apps	Goals
Salon Wilpas	2018	Kolmonen	11	5	–		–		11	5
Salon Wilpas	2019	Kolmonen	1	0	–		–		1	0
Salon Wilpas	Total		12	5	0	0	0	0	12	5
SalPa	2019	Kakkonen	15	0	1	0	–		16	0
SalPa	2020	Kakkonen	16	10	–		–		16	10
SalPa	Total		31	10	1	0	0	0	32	10
Ekenäs IF	2021	Ykkönen	18	6	2	1	–		20	7
TPS	2022	Ykkönen	28	11	0	0	2	0	30	11
TPS II	2022	Kolmonen	1	0	–		–		1	0
Inter Turku	2023	Veikkausliiga	0	0	3	1	3	0	6	1
Inter Turku II	2023	Kolmonen	5	2	–		–		5	2
SalPa (loan)	2023	Ykkönen	11	3	–		–		11	3
SalPa	2024	Ykkösliiga	27	11	2	0	4	1	33	12
VPS	2025	Veikkausliiga	21	4	3	4	4	1	28	9
SalPa	2026	Ykkönen	16	5	2	1	0	0	18	6
Career total			161	57	14	8	13	2	187	67

== Honours ==
TPS

- Ykkönen runner-up: 2022

Individual

- Ykkönen Player of the Month: October 2022
