= Sadat Seidu =

Ghanaian footballer (born 2004)

Personal information
- Date of birth: 5 January 2004 (age 22)
- Place of birth: Ghana
- Height: 1.78 m (5 ft 10 in)
- Position: Central midfielder

Team information
- Current team: SalPa
- Number: 28

Youth career
- Action Light FC

Senior career*
Years	Team	Apps	(Gls)
2023–2025	Accra Lions	31	(1)
2025–2026	KuPS	5	(0)
2025	KuPS II	4	(2)
2026–	SalPa	25	(0)
- * Club domestic league appearances and goals as of 7 November 2026

Sadat Seidu (born 5 January 2004) is a Ghanaian professional footballer who plays as a midfielder for Ykkösliiga club SalPa.

== Club career ==
On 5 September 2023, Seidu signed with Ghana Premier League club Accra Lions.

After having trialed with Finnish Veikkausliiga club Kuopion Palloseura during July 2025, Seidu signed a professional contract with the club on 1 August.

== Career statistics ==
As of 27 July 2026

Appearances and goals by club, season and competition
Club	Season	League			National cup (Note: Includes Finnish Cup)		League cup (Note: Includes Finnish League Cup)		Continental		Total	
Club	Season	Division	Apps	Goals	Apps	Goals	Apps	Goals	Apps	Goals	Apps	Goals
Accra Lions	2023–24	Ghana Premier League	22	1	–		–		–		22	1
Accra Lions	2024–25	Ghana Premier League	9	0	–		–		–		9	0
Accra Lions	Total		31	1	0	0	0	0	0	0	31	1
KuPS	2025	Veikkausliiga	5	0	0	0	0	0	2 (Note: Appearances in UEFA Europa League)	0	7	0
KuPS Akatemia	2025	Ykkönen	4	2	–		–		–		4	2
SalPa	2026	Ykkönen	16	0	1	0	–		–		17	0
Career total			56	3	1	0	0	0	2	0	59	3
