= Ilari Mettälä =

Finnish footballer (born 1994)

Personal information
- Date of birth: 26 April 1994 (age 32)
- Place of birth: Yläne, Finland
- Height: 1.92 m (6 ft 4 in)
- Position: Forward

Team information
- Current team: Gilla FC
- Number: 77

Senior career*
Years	Team	Apps	(Gls)
2014	Pallo-Iirot	17	(3)
2015–2017	TPS	54	(22)
2015	→ SalPa (loan)	9	(5)
2018–2022	Ilves	48	(13)
2021	→ TPS (loan)	16	(7)
2023–	Gilla FC	56	(76)
2023–2024	→ Bali Bulldogs (loan)		
2025-2026	→ Bali Bulldogs (loan)		
- * Club domestic league appearances and goals

Ilari Mettälä (born 26 April 1994) is a Finnish former professional football forward. He plays for Finnish club Gilla FC.

On 27 September 2020, in a Veikkausliiga match between Ilves and TPS, Mettälä suffered a severe injury when he broke his ankle when duelling for a ball against TPS defender Aldayr Hernández. His ankle never fully recovered, and in May 2022, Mettälä announced his retirement from professional football, at age 28.
