= Fredrik Lassas =

Finnish footballer (born 1996)

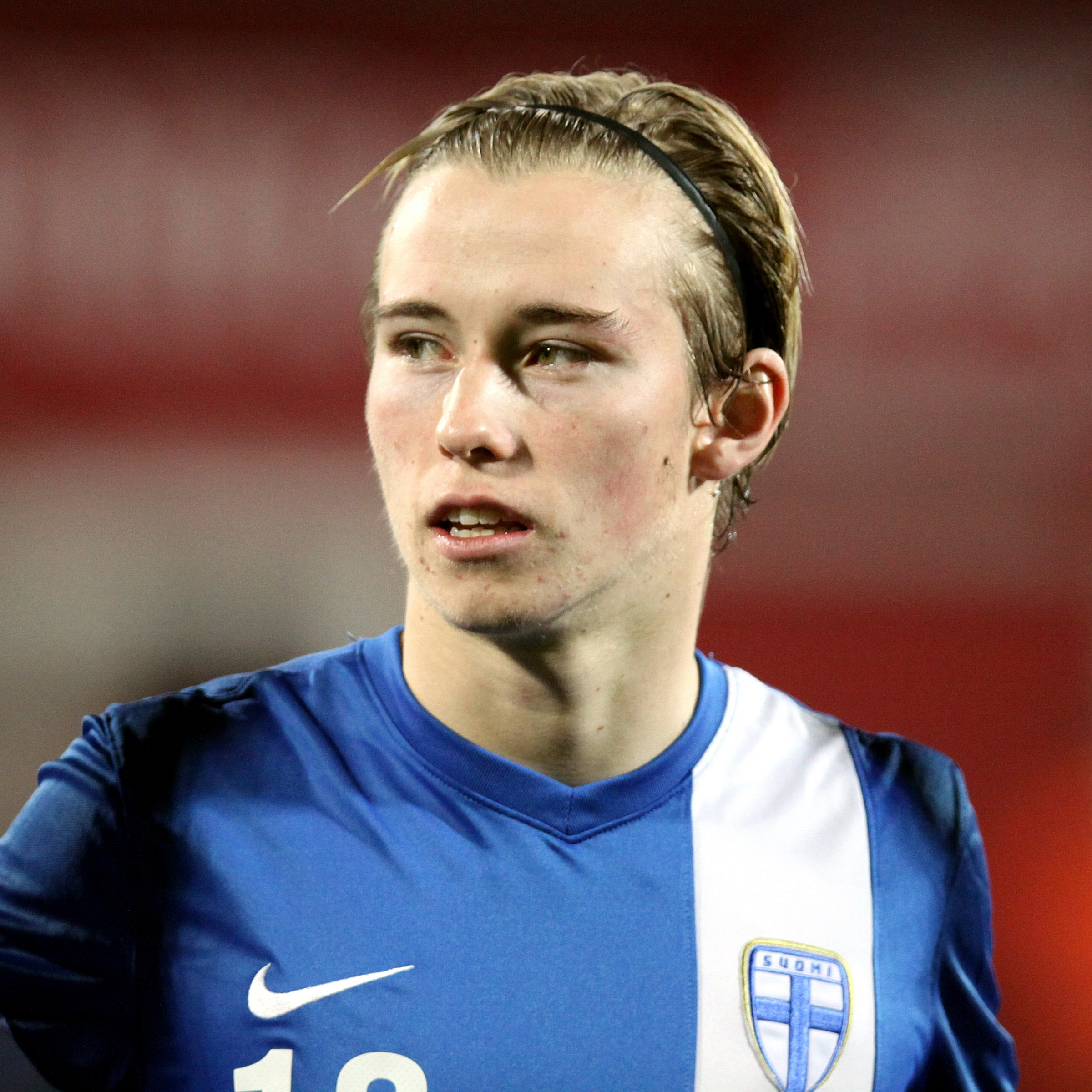

Personal information
- Date of birth: 1 October 1996 (age 30)
- Place of birth: Porvoo, Finland
- Height: 1.78 m (5 ft 10 in)
- Position: Midfielder

Youth career
- 2008–2009: Futura
- 2010–2012: Honka
- 2012–2014: HJK

Senior career*
| Years | Team | Apps | (Gls) |
| 2013–2015 | HJK | 15 | (0) |
| 2013–2014 | → Klubi 04 (loan) | 31 | (7) |
| 2015–2017 | HIFK | 62 | (1) |
| 2016 | → 1. FC Köln II (loan) | 4 | (0) |

International career^{‡}
| 2011 | Finland U15 | 4 | (0) |
| 2011–2012 | Finland U16 | 17 | (3) |
| 2012–2013 | Finland U17 | 6 | (0) |
| 2013–2014 | Finland U18 | 19 | (4) |
| 2015– | Finland U21 | 22 | (4) |
- * Club domestic league appearances and goals as of 30 March 2018 ‡ National team caps and goals as of 30 March 2018

Fredrik Lassas (born 1 October 1996) is a Finnish footballer, who most recently played for HIFK.

== Career ==
He is a former youth talent of FC Futura of Porvoo. He has played for FC Honka and HJK as a youth player as well. His performances have earned him call-ups for youth national teams on a regular basis. To date, he has represented the Finnish youth national team on different levels 46 times in total (as of 5 April 2015) and commonly captains the team. He made his debut in the highest level of Finnish football, Veikkausliiga, on 26 October 2013, substituting Sakari Mattila.

On January 7, 2016, FC Köln confirmed on their website that they had signed Lassas for their reserve team.

== Honors ==
- Promising Footballer of the Year (2014)
