= Gilla FC =

- Short name: Gilla
- Founded: 2022; 4 years ago
- Ground: Jätkäsaaren tekonurmi Bolt Arena (Fenix Trophy)
- Capacity: ≈ 500; 10 770
- Owner: Gilla Oy
- Manager: Arttu Heinonen
- League: Kolmonen
- 2025: Nelonen South Group 2, 1st of 12 (promoted)
- Website: https://gillafc.fi/

Gilla Football Club (formerly Aston Gilla) is an association football club based in Helsinki, Finland.

== History ==
Founded in 2022, Aston Gilla was created by Finnish YouTubers Joona Puhakka, Roope Rannisto, Olli Litmanen and Tuomas Mönkkönen. Due to their influence, Gilla FC is the most followed club in social media in Finland.

Aston Gilla got a spot in the Kutonen and they changed their name to Gilla FC. The club won their group and got promoted to the Vitonen. The same year Gilla FC participated in the Fenix Trophy.

Some notable former professional players such as Përparim Hetemaj, Ilari Mettälä, Duarte Tammilehto, Teemu Penninkangas, Niko Markkula, Youness Rahimi, Mauro Severino, Eero Markkanen, Sakari Mattila, Niko Markkula and Daniel Rantanen have played for the club.
