= Albert Kuqi =

Finnish footballer (born 1992)

Personal information
- Date of birth: 14 February 1992 (age 34)
- Place of birth: Mikkeli, Finland
- Height: 1.85 m (6 ft 1 in)
- Position: Forward

Youth career
- 1997–2002: HJK
- 2003–2004: AC Allianssi
- 2005–2008: Gnistan

Senior career*
Years	Team	Apps	(Gls)
2009	LoPa	1	(0)
2010	Viikingit	0	(0)
2010	→ PK Keski-Uusimaa (loan)	1	(0)
2010	→ Gnistan (loan)	6	(0)
2010	→ Allianssi Vantaa (loan)	3	(3)
2011–2012	Haka	10	(0)
2011	→ MuSa (loan)	8	(0)
2011	→ Ilves-Kissat (loan)	6	(2)
2012	→ EIF (loan)	25	(14)
2013	Futura	10	(2)
2013	EIF Akademi	7	(7)
2014	Honka	5	(0)
2015	PK-35 Vantaa	15	(1)
2017	VJS	2	(0)
Total		99	(29)
- * Club domestic league appearances and goals as of 29 May 2019

Albert Kuqi (born 14 February 1992) is a Finnish former footballer of Kosovo Albanian descent who played as a forward. He is the younger brother of footballers Shefki Kuqi and Njazi Kuqi. Kuqi played in the Veikkausliiga for FC Haka and FC Honka, among other clubs. In September 2025, the District Court of Helsinki sentenced him to eight years in prison for three counts of aggravated narcotics offence related to the importation of cocaine into Finland.

== Football career ==
Kuqi played in the youth teams of HJK, AC Allianssi, and IF Gnistan before beginning his senior career in 2009. He signed a one-year contract with FC Haka in February 2011, with an option for a second year. He made ten appearances in the Veikkausliiga during the 2011 season. On loan at EIF in the Kakkonen in 2012, he scored 14 goals in 25 matches. He played five Veikkausliiga matches for FC Honka in 2014. His last club was VJS in 2017.

== Criminal conviction ==
In 2024–2025, the Helsinki Police Department's professional crime investigation unit uncovered a cocaine importation and distribution network that had smuggled at least 15 kilograms of cocaine from Belgium into Finland. During the investigation, police seized approximately five kilograms of cocaine, about 30 kilograms of marijuana, and more than €100,000 in counterfeit banknotes. The cocaine was systematically distributed to resellers in the Helsinki metropolitan area, and the group's proceeds—amounting to hundreds of thousands of euros—were channelled to Kosovo and Belgium.

=== Organisation ===
According to the police report, the network was built around a close-knit core group that included Kosovar national Lulzim Gerxhaliu, Albanian national Ergi Tusha, and Kuqi, among others. The core members' loyalty was reinforced by kinship and a shared cultural background. Kuqi had known Gerxhaliu since childhood, as Gerxhaliu was related to Kuqi's family through marriage. Gerxhaliu and Tusha, both based in Belgium, organised the cocaine imports and coordinated distribution in Finland, visiting the country regularly. The group used a separate Switzerland-based courier organisation for the physical transport of the drugs.

=== Kuqi's role ===
Kuqi served as one of the key operatives in Finland. His tasks included renting apartments on the informal market for drug storage and distribution, acquiring prepaid phone subscriptions to hinder police tracking, recruiting customers for cocaine sales, and collecting and forwarding sales proceeds to other members of the group.

The cocaine entered Finland in three shipments between August and November 2024. One shipment of approximately seven kilograms arrived on 23 October 2024 when a Switzerland-based courier travelled by ferry from Tallinn to Helsinki with the drugs concealed in a Swiss-registered vehicle. The courier was accompanied by a spouse and a child under three years of age. Kuqi arranged hotel accommodation for the courier's family, received the car keys, and facilitated the transfer of the cocaine to a storage apartment on Gerxhaliu's instructions.

The group initially transferred its proceeds abroad through human couriers travelling via Helsinki Airport. After Customs intercepted one such transfer, the group switched to an unlicensed international money transfer service that charged a commission of 6.5 to 8 per cent. Kuqi delivered cash to the service's representatives on multiple occasions.

=== Investigation and arrests ===
Police monitored the group through telecommunications surveillance and systematic observation. On 12 March 2025, police arrested Tusha and another suspect after Tusha had handed over two kilograms of cocaine. Searches that day yielded approximately two kilograms of cocaine, about 35 kilograms of marijuana, and over €150,000 in counterfeit banknotes. An additional 3.4 kilograms of cocaine was found hidden in the group's storage apartment.

Kuqi was arrested on 2 May 2025 and remanded in custody on 6 May. Gerxhaliu was arrested on 27 June 2025.

=== Sentence ===
On 26 September 2025, the District Court of Helsinki sentenced Kuqi to eight years in prison for three counts of aggravated narcotics offence. Without mitigating factors, the sentence would have exceeded ten years. The court reduced it because Kuqi had cooperated during the investigation and the degree of criminal organisation was assessed as low. The two principal organisers, Gerxhaliu and Tusha, were each sentenced to ten years and two months. Kuqi, Gerxhaliu, and Tusha were jointly ordered to forfeit €357,000 to the state as proceeds of crime. Of the 13 suspects in the case, ten were convicted.

In police interviews, Kuqi described his role as that of a "stupid errand boy" (tyhmä juoksukoira) and stated that he had received €7,000 in total for his involvement.
