= Teemu Penninkangas =

Finnish footballer (born 1992)

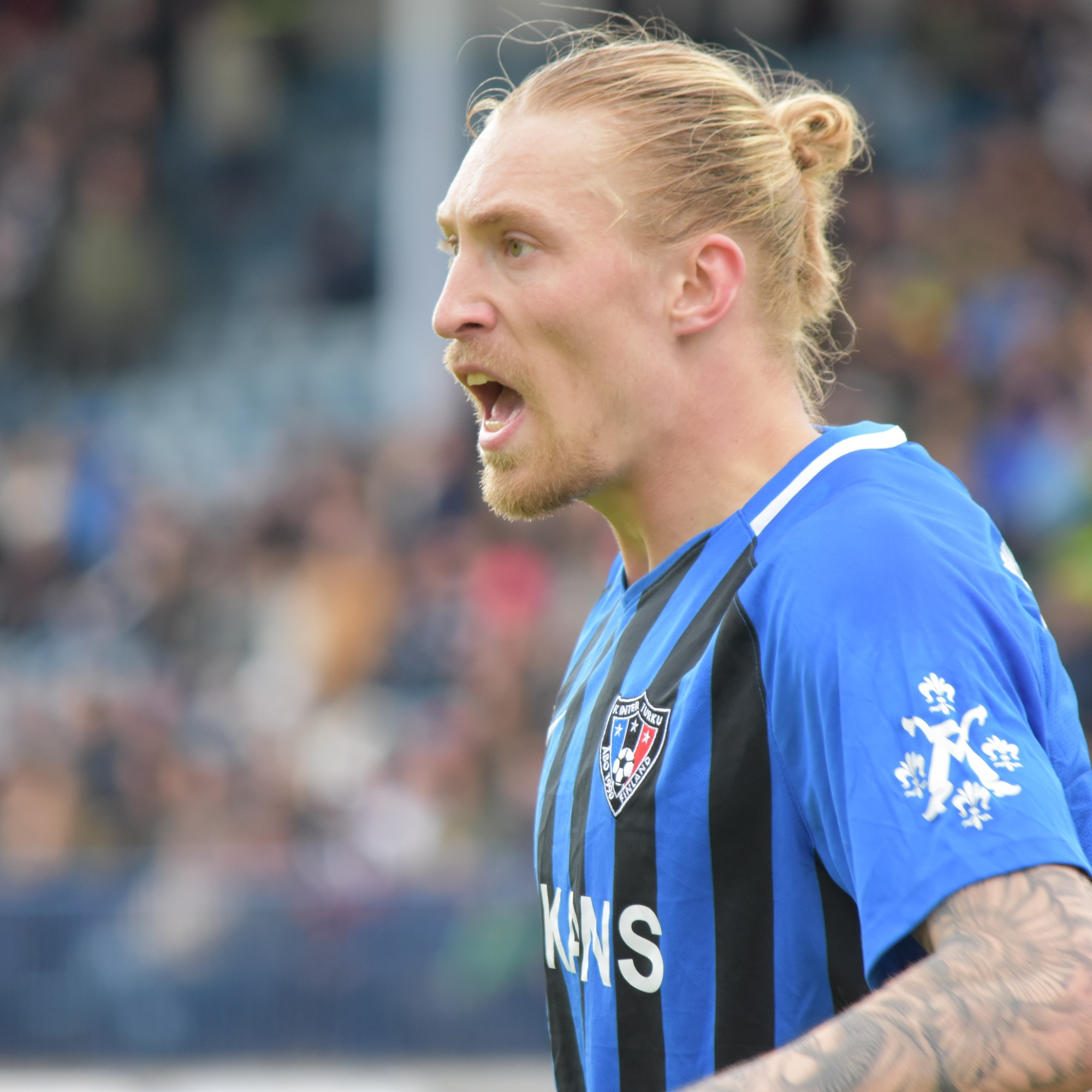
- Penninkangas in Inter Turku 2018

Personal information
- Date of birth: 24 July 1992 (age 34)
- Place of birth: Alavus, Finland
- Height: 1.95 m (6 ft 5 in)
- Position: Left back

Team information
- Current team: Gilla FC

Youth career
- 2004–2007: APV
- 2008–2009: TP-Seinäjoki

Senior career*
Years	Team	Apps	(Gls)
2006	APV	1	(0)
2008	TP-Seinäjoki	2	(0)
2010–2016	SJK	76	(6)
2010	→ Karhu (loan)	1	(0)
2013–2015	→ Kerho 07 (loan)	23	(8)
2015	→ Jazz (loan)	16	(1)
2017	Ilves	21	(2)
2018	Inter Turku	29	(1)
2019	Lahti	24	(1)
2020	Sligo Rovers	13	(0)
2021–2023	Lahti	62	(4)
2024	Gnistan	23	(2)
2025–	Gilla FC	23	(25)
- * Club domestic league appearances and goals as of 13 May 2026

Teemu Penninkangas (born 24 July 1992) is a Finnish former professional footballer who played as a left-back. He retired from his professional career after the 2024 Veikkausliiga season. Simultaneously he announced he would continue playing for Gilla FC in Finnish lower divisions.

== Career ==
Penninkangas won the Veikkausliiga title with SJK in 2015. It was also the first title in club history. Penninkangas made his SJK debut in 2010, back when the club was playing in Kakkonen, the third tier of Finnish football.

On 16 January 2019 Penninkangas signed for FC Lahti He left a year later to Sligo Rovers.

On 10 January 2020, he signed for League of Ireland Premier Division side Sligo Rovers. Penninkangas was released by Sligo Rovers at the end of the 2020 season because the club stopped paying wages due to COVID-19 pandemic.

After a one-year spell at Sligo Rovers Penninkangas rejoined FC Lahti and extended his contract until 31 December 2022.

On 15 December 2023, Gnistan from Northern Helsinki announced the signing of Penninkangas.

== Career statistics ==
As of 26 October 2024.

Appearances and goals by club, season and competition
Club	Season	League			Cup (Note: Includes Suomen Cup and FAI Cup)		League cup (Note: Includes Finnish League Cup)		Europe		Total	
Club	Season	Division	Apps	Goals	Apps	Goals	Apps	Goals	Apps	Goals	Apps	Goals
APV	2006	Kolmonen	1	0	–		–		–		1	0
TP-Seinäjoki	2008	Nelonen	2	0	–		–		–		2	0
SJK Seinäjoki	2011	Kakkonen	20	5	–		–		–		20	5
SJK Seinäjoki	2012	Ykkönen	0	0	1	0	–		–		1	0
SJK Seinäjoki	2013	Ykkönen	13	0	1	0	–		–		14	0
SJK Seinäjoki	2014	Veikkausliiga	11	0	1	0	7	0	–		19	0
SJK Seinäjoki	2015	Veikkausliiga	6	0	0	0	4	0	–		10	0
SJK Seinäjoki	2016	Veikkausliiga	26	2	5	1	3	0	1 (Note: Appearances in UEFA Champions League)	0	35	2
SJK Seinäjoki	Total		76	7	8	1	14	0	1	0	99	8
SJK Akatemia	2013	Kakkonen	14	3	–		–		–		14	3
SJK Akatemia	2014	Kakkonen	8	5	–		–		–		8	5
SJK Akatemia	2015	Kakkonen	1	0	–		–		–		1	0
SJK Akatemia	2016	Kolmonen	1	0	–		–		–		1	0
SJK Akatemia	Total		24	8	0	0	0	0	0	0	24	8
Karhu (loan)	2010	Kolmonen	1	0	–		–		–		1	0
Jazz (loan)	2015	Ykkönen	16	1	–		–		–		16	1
Ilves	2017	Veikkausliiga	19	2	2	0	–		–		21	2
Ilves II	2017	Kolmonen	2	0	–		–		–		2	0
Inter Turku	2018	Veikkausliiga	29	1	4	0	–		–		33	1
Lahti	2019	Veikkausliiga	24	1	4	0	–		–		28	1
Sligo Rovers	2020	LOI Premier Division	13	0	1	0	–		–		14	0
Lahti	2021	Veikkausliiga	16	0	0	0	–		–		16	0
Lahti	2022	Veikkausliiga	24	4	3	1	1	0	–		28	5
Lahti	2023	Veikkausliiga	22	0	1	0	4	0	–		27	0
Lahti	Total		62	4	4	1	5	0	0	0	71	5
Gnistan	2024	Veikkausliiga	23	2	1	0	5	0	–		29	2
Career total			302	26	24	2	24	0	1	0	351	28

== Honours ==
SJK Seinäjoki

- Veikkausliiga: 2015
- Veikkausliiga runner-up: 2014
- Finnish Cup: 2016
- Finnish League Cup: 2014

Inter Turku

- Finnish Cup: 2018
