= Antti Uimaniemi =

Finnish footballer (born 1986)

Personal information
- Date of birth: 30 January 1986 (age 40)
- Place of birth: Kemi, Finland
- Height: 1.71 m (5 ft 7 1/2 in)
- Position: Defender

Youth career
- PS Kemi

Senior career*
Years	Team	Apps	(Gls)
2007–2008	RoPS	27	(0)
2009–2010	MyPa	50	(1)
2011–2016	VPS		
2016–	FC Honka		
- * Club domestic league appearances and goals as of 27 January 2011

Antti Uimaniemi (born 30 January 1986) is a Finnish footballer who currently plays for FC Honka in Finnish Kakkonen.
