= Niko Markkula =

Finnish footballer (born 1990)

Personal information
- Date of birth: 27 June 1990 (age 36)
- Place of birth: Jyväskylä, Finland
- Height: 1.75 m (5 ft 9 in)
- Positions: Full back; midfielder; centre back

Senior career*
Years	Team	Apps	(Gls)
2008–2012	JJK	80	(4)
2013	Eskilstuna City	9	(0)
2013	JJK	4	(0)
2014	FC Haka	19	(1)
2015–2017	JJK	48	(8)
2017–2019	Inter Turku	45	(1)
2020–2022	SJK	36	(2)
2023–	Gilla FC	9	(3)

International career
2012	Finland U21	1	(0)
- * Club domestic league appearances and goals

Niko Markkula (born 27 June 1990) is a Finnish football player who currently plays for Gilla FC.

== Career ==
=== Club ===
Markkula came up through the youth system at JJK. In November 2012, Markkula entered talks with Swedish club Eskilstuna City. In January 2013, Markkula completed his move to the club. He made his competitive debut for Eskilstuna City on 14 April 2013 in a 7–0 away defeat to IK Sirius, playing all ninety minutes of the match. After seven months in Sweden, Markkula moved back to JJK.

In January 2014, Markkula moved to Ykkönen side FC Haka, joining on a one-year contract with an option for a second. He made his competitive debut for the club on 17 April 2014 in a 4–1 away victory over Atlantis FC in the Finnish Cup. He scored his first competitive goal for his new club in this match, converting in the 15th minute to open the scoring. After a year at the club, he returned once again to JJK.

In January 2017, Markkula signed for FC Inter Turku. He made his league debut for the club on 12 April 2017 in a 6–2 home victory over RoPS, playing 74 minutes before being replaced by Kevin Mombilo. He scored his first competitive goal for the club on 8 July 2017 in a 4–0 home victory over his former team, JJK. His goal, scored in the 91st minute, made the score 4–0 to Inter Turku. In July 2017, Markkula suffered a serious heel injury, which sidelined him for over a year and had doctors questioning if he would ever play again. He made his first appearance back from his injury on 26 September 2018, coming on as a 64th-minute substitute for Tatu Varmanen in a 2–0 home victory over FC Lahti.

On 20 December 2019, Markkula joined Finnish club SJK on a deal until the end of 2021.

=== International ===
Markkula made his first competitive appearance for Finland U21s on 10 October 2011 in a 1–0 defeat to Sweden U21s at the 2011 U21 Euros, coming on as an 83rd-minute substitute for Juho Lähde.

Markkula was called up to the men's national team in September 2019. He was an unused substitute in a home match against Greece.

== Honours ==
=== Individual ===
- Veikkausliiga Team of the Year: 2019
