= Eero Korte =

Finnish footballer (born 1987)

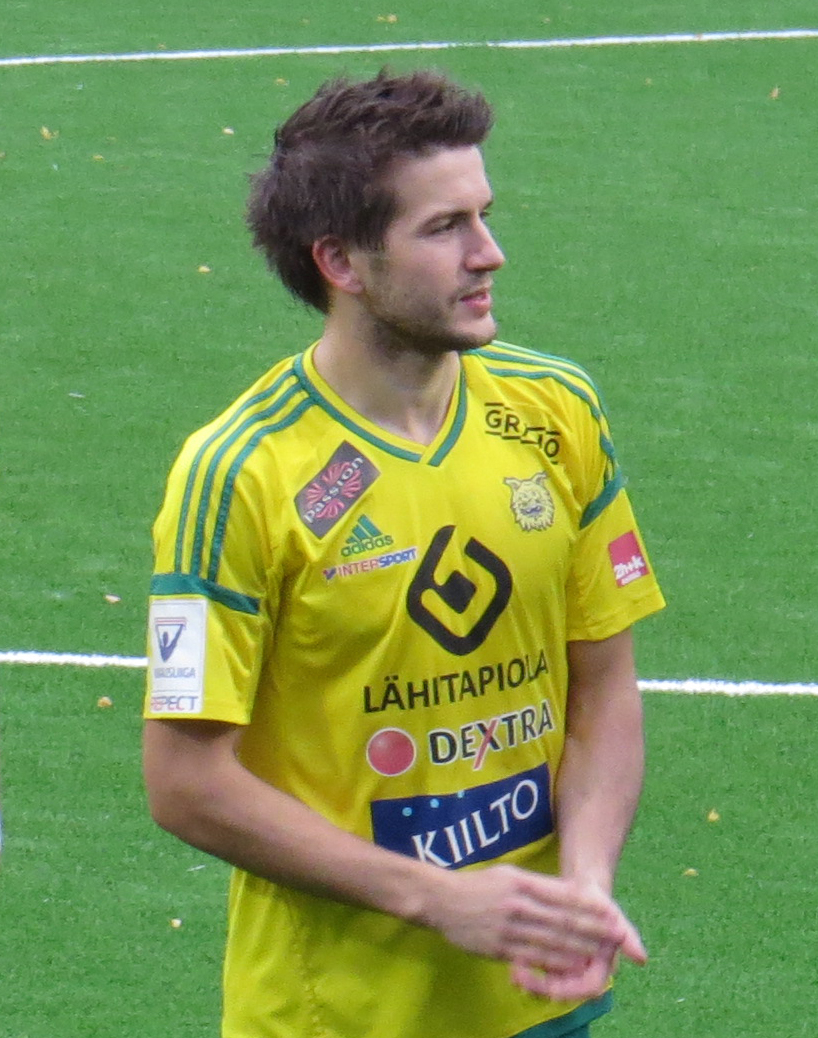
- Eero Korte in 2015

Personal information
- Full name: Eero Tapio Korte
- Date of birth: 20 September 1987 (age 39)
- Place of birth: Orimattila, Finland
- Position: Midfielder

Youth career
- Reipas

Senior career*
Years	Team	Apps	(Gls)
2004–2010	Lahti	118	(8)
2011–2013	JJK	40	(3)
2014	Lahti	22	(1)
2015–2017	Ilves	26	(2)

International career
- Finland U17
- Finland U19
- Finland U23
- * Club domestic league appearances and goals

Eero Tapio Korte (born 20 September 1987) is a Finnish former professional footballer who played as a midfielder.

Early in his career, Korte was called "the next Jari Litmanen" by Finnish football experts due to his phenomenal technique, but failed to live up to expectations. Although Korte made his Veikkausliiga debut already in 2004, only at the age of 16, he suffered from multiple injuries during the first years at Lahti. During the years 2003–2004 he was invited to various training camps of clubs like Ajax, Chelsea and Fiorentina.

The 2008 season is widely believed to be the year of his breakthrough in the Premier Division. During the next season he played in all FC Lahti's matches, as they placed third in Veikkausliiga.

But soon after the 2010 season as FC Lahti were relegated from Veikkausliiga, Korte joined JJK on a two-year contract.

After spending two years in JJK he returned to Lahti for one season before joining in newly promoted Ilves on a two-year contract.
