= Oskari Jakonen =

Finnish footballer (born 1997)

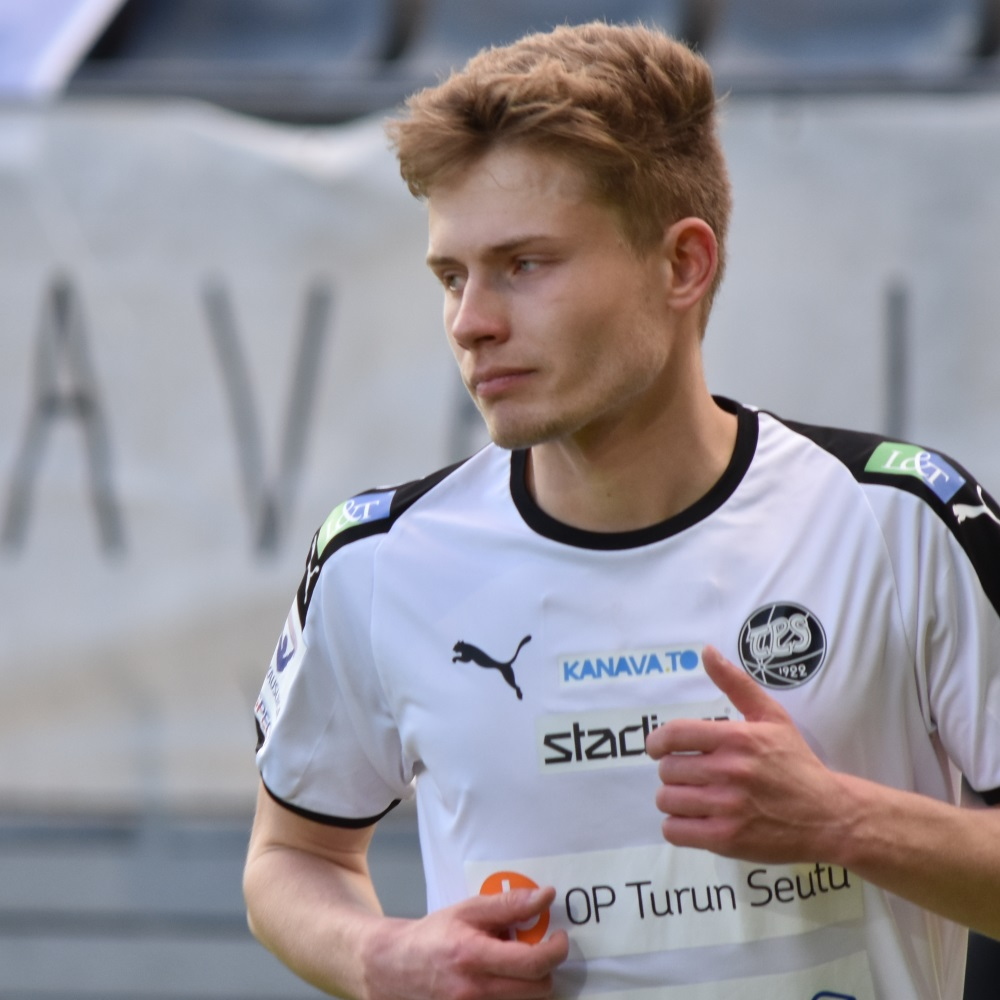
- Jakonen playing for TPS in 2018.

Personal information
- Date of birth: 22 April 1997 (age 29)
- Place of birth: Finland
- Height: 1.83 m (6 ft 0 in)
- Positions: Winger; attacking midfielder

Team information
- Current team: SalPa
- Number: 8

Youth career
- SalPa
- 2014: Midtjylland

Senior career*
Years	Team	Apps	(Gls)
2012–2015	SalPa	62	(9)
2015–2021	TPS	148	(17)
2022–	SalPa	81	(4)
- * Club domestic league appearances and goals as of 7 November 2026

Oskari Jakonen (born 22 April 1997) is a Finnish professional footballer who plays for Ykkösliiga club SalPa, as a winger and attacking midfielder.

== Personal life ==
His brother Olli is also a professional footballer for SalPa. Their father Petri Jakonen is a Finnish former international footballer and a current sports executive.

== Career statistics ==
As of 7 November 2026

Appearances and goals by club, season and competition
Club	Season	League			Cup		League cup (Note: Includes Ykköscup and Ykkösliigacup)		Total	
Club	Season	Division	Apps	Goals	Apps	Goals	Apps	Goals	Apps	Goals
SalPa	2012	Kakkonen	11	0	–		–		11	0
SalPa	2013	Kakkonen	24	3	1	0	–		25	3
SalPa	2014	Kakkonen	24	6	0	0	–		24	6
SalPa	2015	Kakkonen	3	0	–		–		3	0
SalPa	Total		62	9	1	0	0	0	63	9
TPS	2015	Ykkönen	18	0	2	0	–		20	0
TPS	2016	Ykkönen	24	4	1	0	–		25	4
TPS	2017	Ykkönen	26	6	5	0	–		31	6
TPS	2018	Veikkausliiga	28	4	4	0	–		32	4
TPS	2019	Ykkönen	21	4	4	2	–		25	6
TPS	2020	Veikkausliiga	21	0	7	0	–		28	0
TPS	2021	Ykkönen	16	0	3	1	–		19	1
TPS	Total		154	18	26	3	0	0	180	11
TPS U23	2021	Kolmonen	2	2	–		–		2	2
SalPa	2022	Kakkonen	22	3	3	0	–		25	3
SalPa	2023	Ykkönen	25	1	4	0	4	1	33	2
SalPa	2024	Ykkösliiga	17	0	0	0	3	0	20	0
SalPa	2025	Ykkösliiga	5	0	1	0	2	0	8	0
SalPa	2026	Ykkönen	12	0	1	0	0	0	13	0
SalPa	Total		81	4	9	0	9	1	99	5
Career total			296	33	35	3	9	1	340	37

== Honours ==
TPS

- Ykkönen: 2016, 2017
- Ykkönen runner-up: 2019

SalPa

- Kakkonen, Group B: 2022
