= Ville-Valtteri Starck =

Finnish footballer (born 1995)

Personal information
- Date of birth: 3 February 1995 (age 31)
- Place of birth: Finland
- Height: 1.85 m (6 ft 1 in)
- Position: Defender

Team information
- Current team: FC Jazz

Senior career*
Years	Team	Apps	(Gls)
2012–2014	TPS Turku	30	(0)
2011–2014	→ Åbo IFK	31	(1)
2015–	FC Jazz		
- * Club domestic league appearances and goals as of 22 February 2015

Ville-Valtteri Starck (born 3 February 1995) is a Finnish footballer who currently plays for FC Jazz in the Finnish second tier Ykkönen. He has previously played three seasons in the Finnish top division Veikkausliiga for TPS Turku.
