= Saloum Faal =

Gambian footballer

Personal information
- Full name: Saloum Faal
- Date of birth: 10 October 1994 (age 32)
- Place of birth: Serekunda, The Gambia
- Position: Midfielder

Team information
- Current team: FC Futura
- Number: 15

Youth career
- Gambia Ports Authority F.C.

Senior career*
Years	Team	Apps	(Gls)
2010–2013	Gambia Ports Authority		
2013–2014	Casa Sports		
2015	FC Jazz		
2017	Etelä-Espoon Pallo	10	(4)
2018	FC Kiffen 08	11	(0)
2018–2020	IF Gnistan	42	(4)
2021	VJS	8	(0)
2022–	FC Futura	25	(2)

International career^{‡}
2012–2013	Gambia	3	(0)
- * Club domestic league appearances and goals as of 26 October 2023 ‡ National team caps and goals as of 18 June 2023

Saloum Faal (born 10 October 1994) is a Gambian professional footballer currently playing for FC Futura in the Finnish third tier Kakkonen.

In Finland Faal has also represented FC Jazz, Etelä-Espoon Pallo, FC Kiffen 08, IF Gnistan and Vantaan Jalkapalloseura. He has previously also played for Gambia Ports Authority and Casa Sports in Africa.

Faal has capped three times for the Gambia national football team. He made his international debut at age 17, against Algeria on 15 June 2012.
