= Jordi van Gelderen =

Dutch footballer

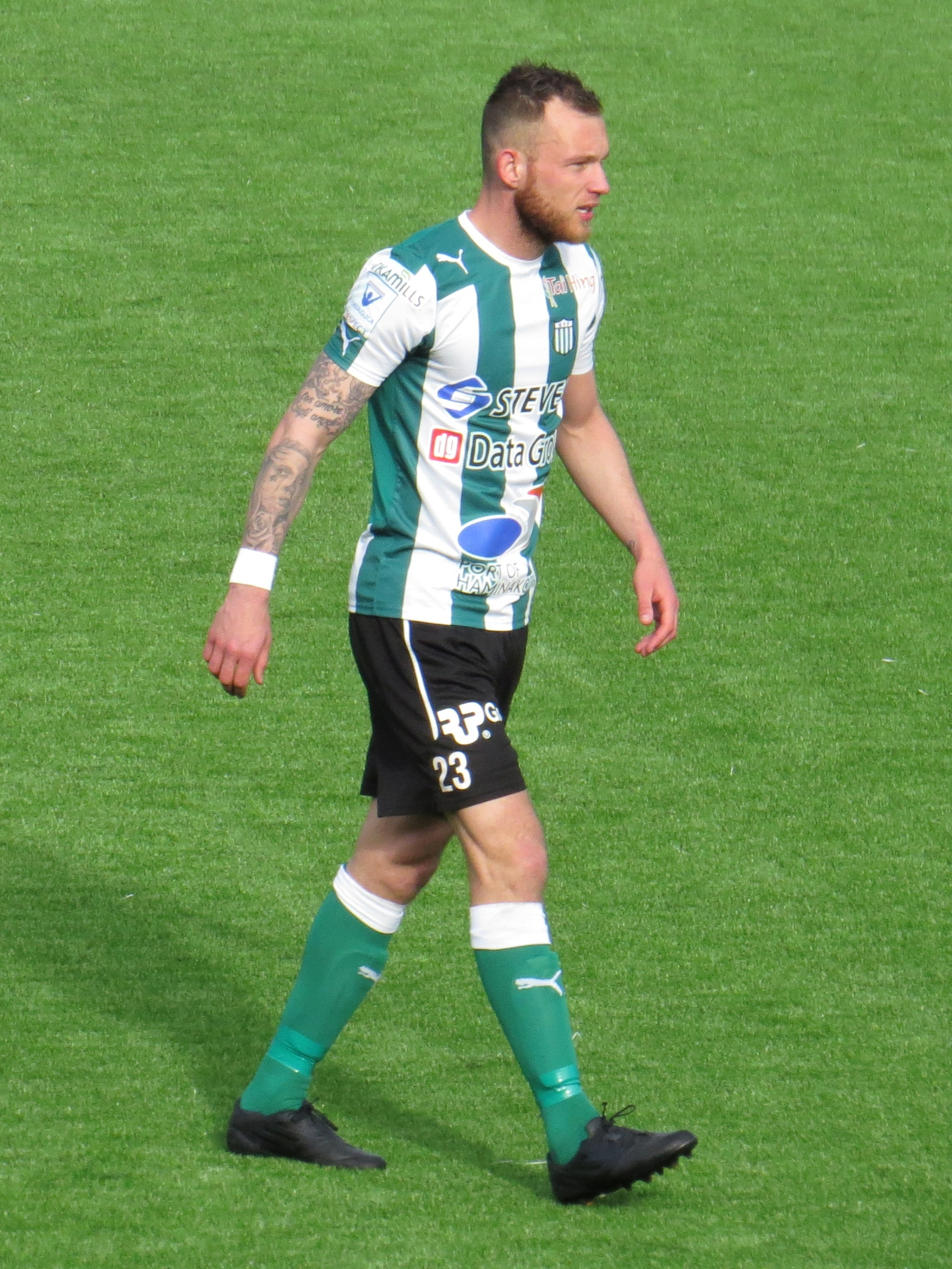
- Jordi van Gelderen in 2015

Personal information
- Date of birth: 26 April 1990 (age 36)
- Place of birth: Amstelveen, Netherlands
- Position: Defender

Youth career
- 2003–2009: Haarlem

Senior career*
Years	Team	Apps	(Gls)
2010–2011	Argon	4	(0)
2011–2012	Willem II	0	(0)
2012–2014	JJK	62	(6)
2015	KTP	31	(0)
2016	AFC	10	(2)
2017	Teutonia Watzenborn-Steinberg	13	(1)
2018–2020	Legmeervogels		
2020–2023	Aalsmeer		
- * Club domestic league appearances and goals

Jordi van Gelderen (born 26 April 1990) is a Dutch retired footballer who played as a defender.

== Career ==
Born in Amstelveen, Van Gelderen has played club football in the Netherlands and Finland for Haarlem, Argon, Willem II and JJK. Van Gelderen scored on his debut for JJK in May 2012, and he appeared in the qualifying rounds of the 2012 Europa League for them. He joined KTP for the 2015 season.

After his Finnish adventure, van Gelderen returned to the Netherlands to play for AFC, but later moved to German lower league side Teutonia Watzenborn-Steinberg. After trials at Limerick F.C. and Hessen Kassel, he returned to Dutch amateur side Legmeervogels in February 2018.
