= Washilly Tshibasu =

Belgian footballer

Personal information
- Date of birth: 25 February 1990 (age 36)
- Place of birth: Belgium
- Position: Midfielder

Senior career*
Years	Team	Apps	(Gls)
-2010/11	Royal Antwerp F.C.	3	(0)
2013	Oulun Palloseura	6	(0)
2013-2014	Kokkolan Palloveikot	34	(5)
2015	PS Kemi Kings	12	(3)
2015-2017	Kokkolan Palloveikot	39	(22)
2019	FF Jaro	5	(1)
- * Club domestic league appearances and goals

Washilly Tshibasu (born 25 February 1990 in Belgium) is a Belgian footballer.
