= Janne Henriksson =

Finnish footballer (born 1981)

Personal information
- Date of birth: 8 August 1981 (age 45)
- Place of birth: Turku, Finland
- Height: 1.88 m (6 ft 2 in)
- Position: Goalkeeper

Youth career
- KaaPo, FC Emmen (NL)

Senior career*
Years	Team	Apps	(Gls)
2001–2004	VPS	76	(0)
2005	TP-47	26	(0)
2006–2008	KooTeePee	64	(0)
2009–2010	FC Honka	6	(0)
2011–2014	VPS	16	(0)
2015	Vasa IFK	21	(0)
2016	Kokkolan PV		
- * Club domestic league appearances and goals as of 26 January 2011

Janne Henriksson (born 8 August 1981) is a Finnish former football goalkeeper who played for multiple clubs in the Veikkausliiga. He has a total of 211 appearances for these clubs. He started his senior career in the late 1990s, and retired in 2017.
