= Ville Viljala =

Finnish footballer (born 1995)

Personal information
- Date of birth: 4 February 1995 (age 31)
- Place of birth: Jyväskylä, Finland
- Height: 1.83 m (6 ft 0 in)
- Position: Goalkeeper

Team information
- Current team: Honka
- Number: 12

Youth career
- Palokan Riento
- –2011: JJK

Senior career*
Years	Team	Apps	(Gls)
2011–2013	JJK	9	(0)
2012	→ Warkaus JK (loan)	16	(0)
2012	→ Jämsänkosken Ilves (loan)	5	(0)
2014	SJK	0	(0)
2014	SJK II	9	(0)
2015	Ekenäs IF	25	(0)
2016	JJK	21	(0)
2017–2021	Vaajakoski	70	(1)
2022–2023	JJK	43	(0)
2024–2025	PK-35	25	(0)
2025	→ Honka (loan)	11	(0)
2026–	Honka	1	(0)

International career
2011	Finland U17	3	(0)
2011	Finland U19	2	(0)
- * Club domestic league appearances and goals as of 8 November 2026

Ville Viljala (born 2 February 1995) is a Finnish professional footballer who plays as a goalkeeper for Kakkonen club Honka.
