= Antti Koskinen (footballer) =

Finnish footballer (born 1988)

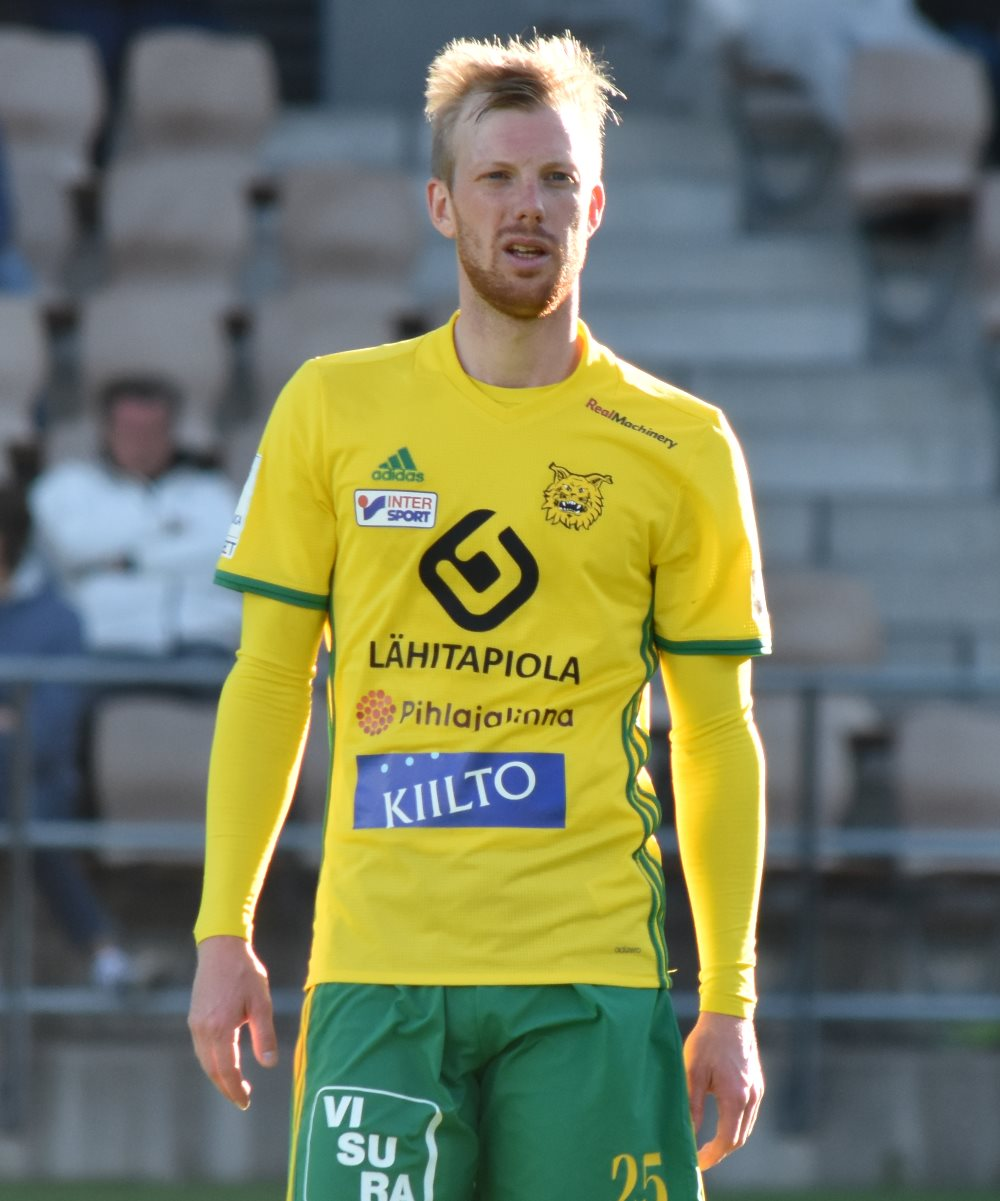
- Koskinen with Ilves in 2017

Personal information
- Date of birth: 19 July 1988 (age 37)
- Place of birth: Eurajoki, Finland
- Position: Defender

Senior career*
Years	Team	Apps	(Gls)
–2010	Pallo-Iirot	109	(1)
2011–2014	MYPA	99	(0)
2015–2017	Ilves	21	(0)
2018	FC Stadlau	4	(0)
2018–2021	ASK Elektra Wien	6	(0)
2021–2022	SC Ortmann	20	(0)
2022–	ASK Mannersdorf	18	(1)
- * Club domestic league appearances and goals

Antti Koskinen (born 19 July 1988) is a Finnish footballer who plays as a defender for ASK Mannersdorf.

== Early life ==
Koskinen was born in 1988 in Finland. He is a native of Eurajoki, Finland.

== Career ==
Koskinen started his career with Finnish side Pallo-Iirot. In 2011, he signed for Finnish side Myllykosken Pallo −47. In 2015, he signed for Finnish side Ilves. He captained the club. In 2018, he signed for Austrian side FC Stadlau. In 2018, he signed for Austrian side ASK Elektra. In 2021, he signed for Austrian side SC Ortmann. In 2022, he signed for Austrian side ASK Mannersdorf.

== Personal life ==
Koskinen has worked in the logistics industry.
