= Juri Kinnunen =

Finnish footballer (born 1990)

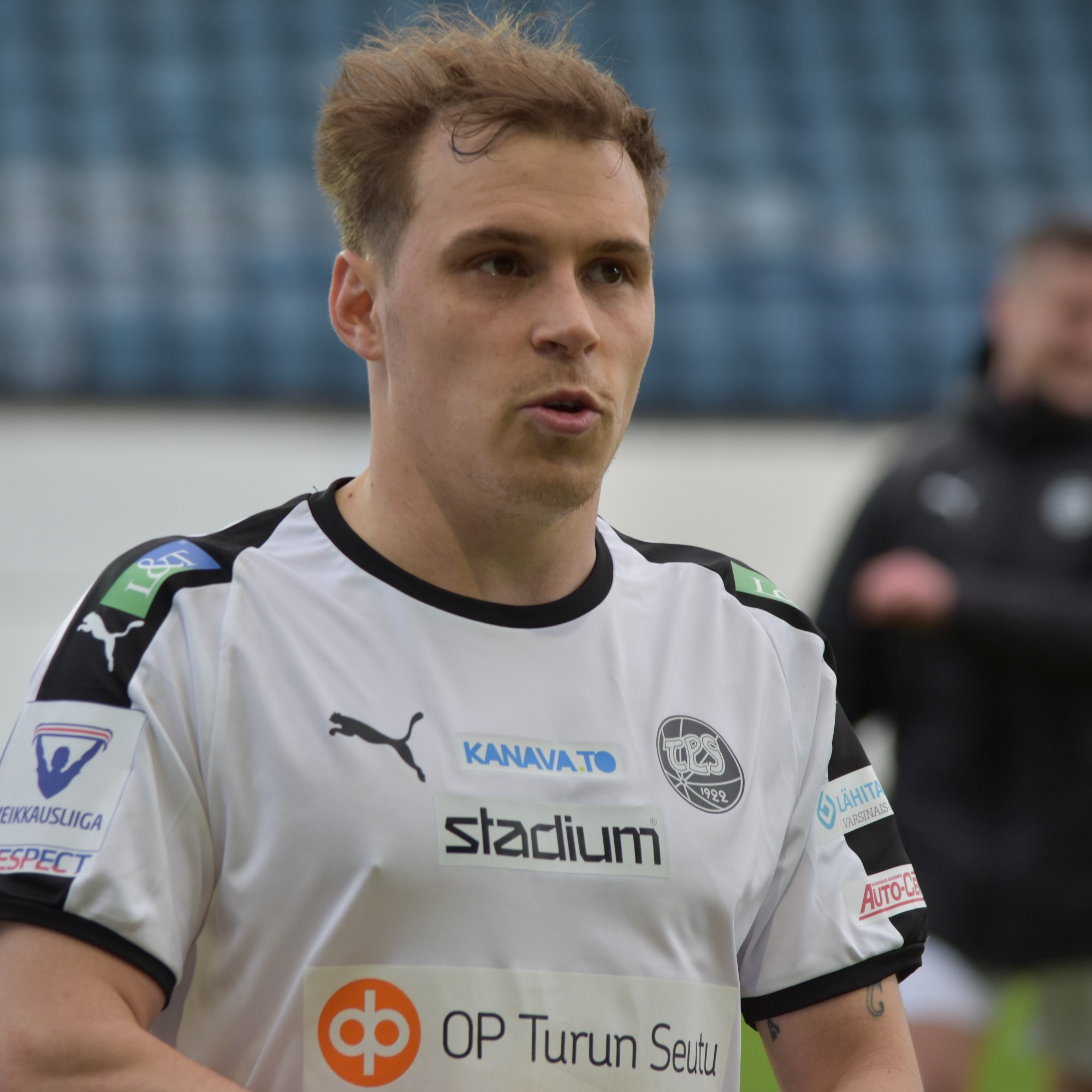

Personal information
- Date of birth: 9 March 1990 (age 36)
- Place of birth: Finland
- Height: 1.73 m (5 ft 8 in)
- Position: Left back

Youth career
- HJK

Senior career*
Years	Team	Apps	(Gls)
2009–2010	Klubi 04	41	(0)
2011–2014	FC Viikingit	59	(1)
2013	→ PK-35 Vantaa (loan)	18	(0)
2014–2018	TPS	107	(8)
2019–2020	KPV	28	(0)
2020–2022	TPS	47	(2)
2023	KäPa	23	(3)
- * Club domestic league appearances and goals as of 27 November 2023

Juri Kinnunen (born 9 March 1990) is a Finnish former professional footballer who played as a left back.

== Career ==
On 22 December 2018, KPV announced the signing of Kinnunen.

On 21 February 2023, Kinnunen signed with KäPa.
