= Jordaan Brown =

English association football player

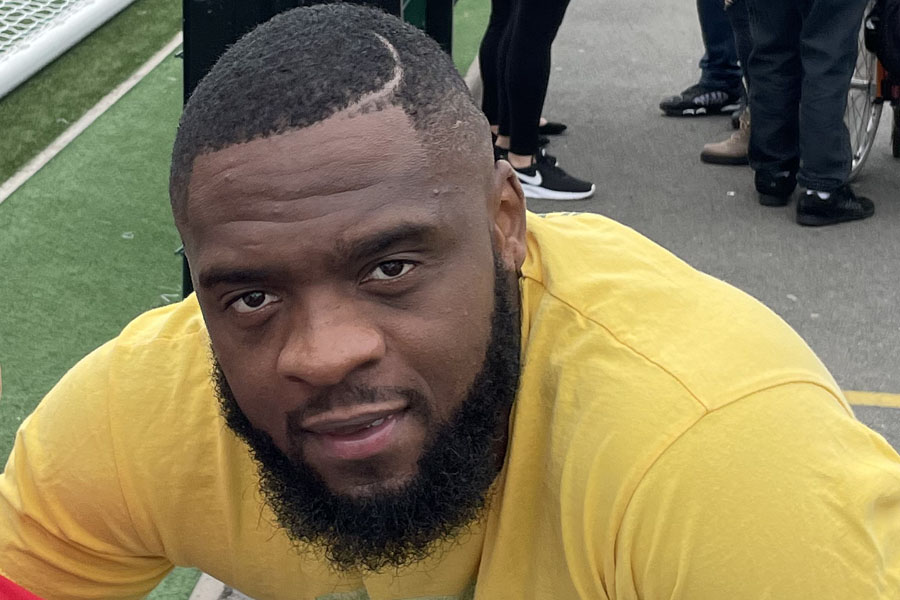
- Brown in October 2021

Personal information
- Full name: Jordaan Kyle Brown
- Date of birth: 13 March 1992 (age 34)
- Place of birth: London, England
- Height: 1.88 m (6 ft 2 in)
- Position: Defender

Team information
- Current team: Rushall Olympic

Senior career*
Years	Team	Apps	(Gls)
2010–2011	AFC Wimbledon	0	(0)
2011–2012	Chipstead	32	(2)
2012–2014	Staines Town	73	(2)
2014–2015	VPS	12	(0)
2015	Flekkerøy	20	(0)
2016	Hayes & Yeading United	16	(0)
2016–2017	Redditch United		
2017–2018	Stafford Rangers		
2018–2021	Stourbridge	67	(4)
2021–2022	Tamworth	16	(1)
2022–2024	Rushall Olympic	75	(1)
2024–2025	Stourbridge	39	(0)
2025–	Rushall Olympic	0	(0)
- * Club domestic league appearances and goals as of 10:40, 2 July 2025 (UTC)

Jordaan Kyle Brown (born 13 March 1992) is an English footballer who plays as a defender for Southern League Premier Division Central club Rushall Olympic.

At club level, he has played in three countries: in England for AFC Wimbledon and Staines Town; in Finland for VPS; and in Norway for Flekkerøy.

== Club career ==
=== AFC Wimbledon ===
Jordaan Brown signed for English club AFC Wimbledon in 2010 and didn't play any games. After one season, in 2011, he left Wimbledon on a free transfer to Chipstead.

=== Staines Town ===
==== 2012-13 ====
After signing for Staines Town, Brown became a fan favorite, and in his first season played 33 games, scored one goal, and was booked zero times. In January that season, he was rumored to be on the books of an unknown League 1 team, but obviously didn't make the move as he played the day after the window closed in a 1–0 win over Bath City.

==== 2013-14 ====
===== FA Cup =====
Jordaan Brown had a memorable year in 2013–14 at Staines. Staines made a run in the FA Cup by qualifying for the first round proper. In the third round qualifying, Staines took on Sittingbourne. The Swans won 4–1, Jordaan Brown setting up the second. They drew Poole 0–0 in the first leg, but away, beat them 1–0 in the second round. Though they lost to Brentford 5–0 in the first round proper, but the run is remembered in Staines' history.

==== Conference South ====
That year, Staines finished 8th, narrowly missing the play-off spot. Brown was however injured earlier in the season. He scored once and played 38 games. He was only booked once that year, before being sighted by top division Finnish team VPS.

=== VPS ===
==== UEFA Europa League ====
In 2014, he signed a contract with Finnish club VPS. When asked why he left Staines, he said simply "I wanted to get a chance to play in Europe," and on his debut he got his wish; against Swedish club Brommapojkarna, played in the Europa League and not only played, but starred with an incredible run down the wing, and a fabulous cross for Jordan Seabrook to finish off. VPS won the match 2–1.

=== Flekkerøy ===
In February 2015 he signed for Flekkerøy in the Norwegian Second Division for a small fee.

=== Return to England ===
In January 2016, Brown returned to England to sign for Hayes & Yeading United before joining Redditch United that summer. On 10 January 2017, whilst at Redditch, Brown featured as a trialist for Grimsby Town in a 4–3 reserve match win against Rotherham United.

On 11 August 2017, Brown signed for Stafford Rangers. In April 2018, Brown picked up three awards from the club after his debut season.

=== Stourbridge ===
On 9 June 2018, Brown signed for Stourbridge.

=== Tamworth ===
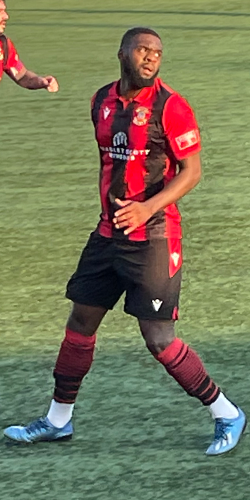
Brown playing for Tamworth in July 2021.

On 6 June 2021, Brown was announced as a signing for Southern League Premier Division Central rivals Tamworth. Brown made his debut for Tamworth on 14 August 2021, the opening day of the Southern League Premier Division Central season away at Royston Town coming on as a 68th-minute substitute for Henri Wilder.

Brown completed the next 3 league matches, but surcome to injury on his fifth Southern League Premier Division Central appearance, as Tamworth hosted local rivals Nuneaton Borough at home on 30 August 2021. Brown was replaced by Ben Hart at half time, as a Dan Creaney hat-trick helped Tamworth to a 3-0 victory.

Following all of September on the side lines, Brown returned to first team action on 2 October 2021, as Tamworth defeated Leiston 3-1 away from home in the 3rd qualifying round of the FA Cup, with Brown completing the full match.

Tamworth returned to Southern League Premier Division Central action the following week as they came up against Rushall Olympic at Dales Lane. Brown's game was ended after just 6 minutes, as a hamstring injury forced him off, being replaced by his former Stourbridge teammate Martin Riley. Tamworth went on to pick up a 2-1 victory, with both goals coming from Dan Creaney in injury time.

Brown scored his first goal for Tamworth in what turned out to be the player's last game for the club on 19 March 2022, when he scored a second half leveller to help the club draw 2-2 away at AFC Rushden & Diamonds in a Southern League Premier Division Central fixture.

=== Rushall Olympic ===
On 23 March 2022, Brown swapped Tamworth for Southern League Premier Division Central rivals Rushall Olympic. Jordaan made his debut in the next fixture on 26 March 2022, as Rushall Olympic defeated Stratford Town by a 4-1 scoreline in a Southern League Premier Division Central fixture.

With Rushall Olympic qualifying for the Southern League Premier Division Central playoffs, they faced Coalville Town in an away fixture on 26 April 2022. Unfortunately for Brown he received a red card in the 29th minute, and Rushall Olympic were defeated 3-0.

On 3 June 2022, Rushall Olympic confirmed that Brown had re-signed with them for the 2022–23 season.

=== Return to Stourbridge ===
On 14 June 2024, Brown returned to Stourbridge for his second stint at the club.

=== Return to Rushall Olympic ===
In June 2025, Brown returned to Rushall Olympic following their relegation to the Northern Premier League Premier Division.

== International career ==
In 2014, Brown confirmed that Jamaica had contacted him with regards to a possible international call-up.

== Career statistics ==
=== Club ===
As of match played 12 May 2022

Appearances and goals by club, season and competition
Club	Season	League			National Cup		League Cup		Other		Total	
Club	Season	Division	Apps	Goals	Apps	Goals	Apps	Goals	Apps	Goals	Apps	Goals
Hayes & Yeading United	2015–16	National League South	16	0	0	0	—		0	0	16	0
Stourbridge	2018–19	Southern League Premier Division Central	34	0	4	0	—		4 (Note: One appearance in FA Trophy) (Note: Two appearances in Birmingham Senior Cup) (Note: One appearance in Southern Football League play-offs)	0	42	0
Stourbridge	2019–20	Southern League Premier Division Central	28	4	7	1	—		3 (Note: Three appearances in FA Trophy)	0	38	5
Stourbridge	2020–21	Southern League Premier Division Central	5	0	1	0	—		1 (Note: One appearance in FA Trophy)	0	7	0
Tamworth	2021–22	Southern League Premier Division Central	16	1	1	0	—		1 (Note: One appearance in FA Trophy)	0	18	1
Rushall Olympic	2021–22	Southern League Premier Division Central	3	0	0	0	—		3 (Note: Two appearances in Walsall Senior Cup) (Note: One appearance in Southern Football League play-offs)	0	6	0
Rushall Olympic	2022–23	Southern League Premier Division Central	0	0	0	0	—		0	0	0	0
Career total			102	5	13	1	0	0	11	0	127	6
