= Matthew Mendy =

Gambian footballer

Matt Mendy
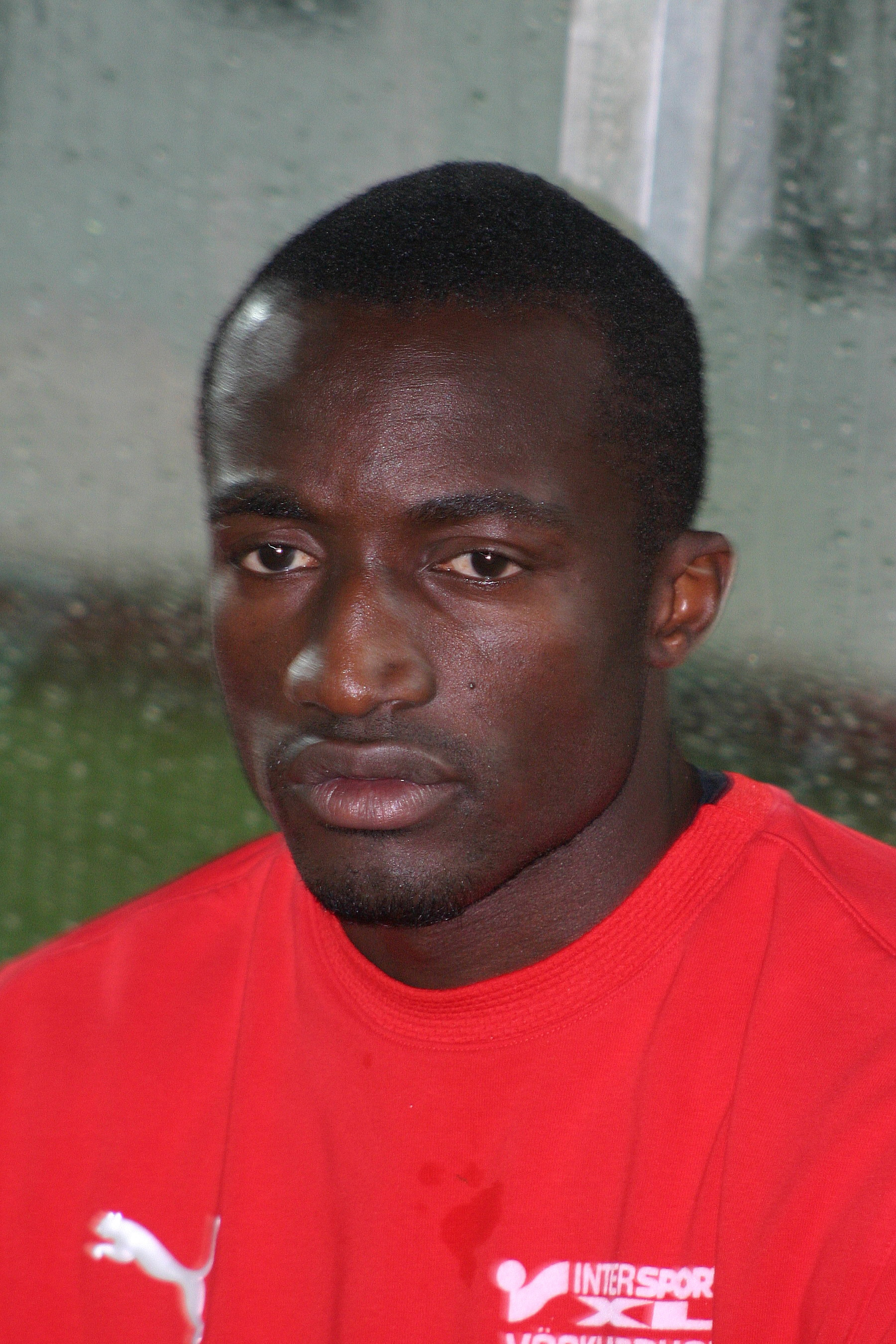
- Mendy in 2008

Personal information
- Full name: Matthew Mendy
- Date of birth: 13 June 1983 (age 43)
- Place of birth: Serekunda, The Gambia
- Height: 1.82 m (5 ft 11 1/2 in)
- Position: Midfielder

Team information
- Current team: FC Jazz

Youth career
- 1997–1999: Mass Sosseh FC

College career
Years	Team	Apps	(Gls)
2001–2002	Alabama A&M Bulldogs		
2003–2007	George Mason Patriots		

Senior career*
Years	Team	Apps	(Gls)
2000	Gamtel FC	–	(–)
2007–2008	KFC Uerdingen 05	39	(3)
2008	1. FC Kleve	1	(0)
2008–2009	1. FC Vöcklabruck	13	(0)
2010	Anhui Jiufang	12	(3)
2011	Tianjin Runyulong	0	(0)
2012	Trönö IK	7	(2)
2012–2013	Balzan F.C.	27	(1)
2013–2014	Feni SC	–	(4)
2014–	FC Jazz	–	

International career
2002–2004	Gamba U-20	12	(2)
2006–2008	Gambia	13	(1)
- * Club domestic league appearances and goals

Matthew Mendy (born 13 June 1983 in Serekunda) is a football defender from Gambia, he currently plays for FC Jazz in the Finnish second tier Ykkönen. Mendy was signed by Jazz in August 2014.

== Career ==
From 2001 to 2007 Mendy was studying in the United States and played for Alabama A&M Bulldogs and George Mason Patriots. In April 2007 he was transferred to German team KFC Uerdingen 05 and later to 1. FC Kleve. After only one month with Kleve he was signed by Erste Liga club 1. FC Vöcklabruck. Mendy has also played in China, Sweden, Malta and in 2013–2014 for Feni Soccer Club in Bangladesh Premier League.

== International ==
Mendy has capped nine times for the Gambia national football team
