= Jani Bäckman =

Finnish footballer (born 1988)

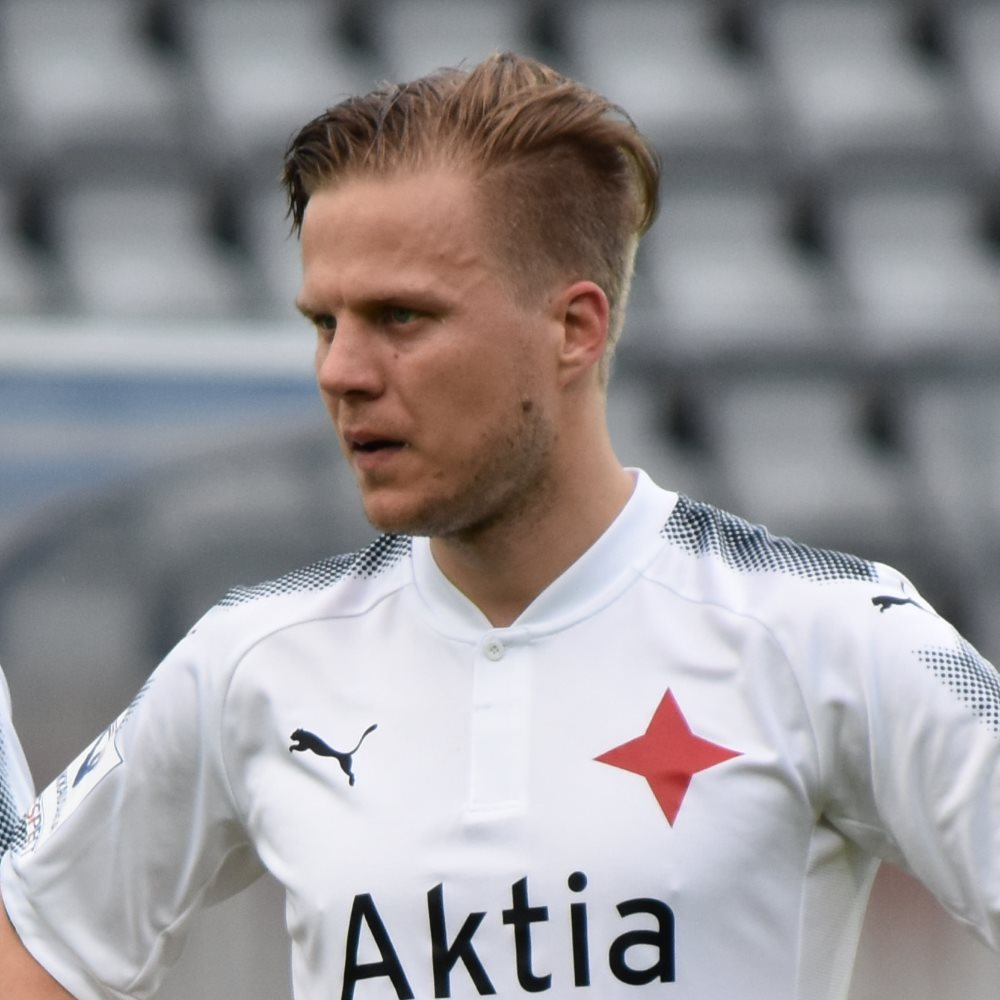
- Jani Bäckmän playing for HIFK in 2017

Personal information
- Date of birth: 20 March 1988 (age 38)
- Height: 1.79 m (5 ft 10 in)
- Position: Midfielder

Youth career
- 2003: IF Sibbo-Vargarna
- 2004–2005: Klubi-04
- 2006: HJK

Senior career*
Years	Team	Apps	(Gls)
2006–2007	HJK	4	(3)
2008–2009	FC Honka	11	(1)
2009	→ FC Haka (loan)	8	(1)
2009	Klubi-04	7	(5)
2010	FF Jaro	7	(0)
2011–2012	FC Lahti	46	(4)
2013–2014	FC Viikingit	31	(1)
2014	PK-35	6	(0)
2015–2022	HIFK	151	(13)
- * Club domestic league appearances and goals

Jani Bäckman (born 20 March 1988) is a Finnish former football player.

== Career ==
Bäckman began his career with IF Sibbo-Vargarna and joined Klubi-04 in 2004. He played his one and only game with the team in Ykkönen against RoPS on 28 April 2007. Bäckman was then transferred to HJK in 2006 and played for their youth side. In January 2007, he was promoted to play with the club's senior team.

After one year with HJK and only one professional game for the club in the Finnish Cup, Bäckman sealed a move to FC Honka. He played 16 games for the club, from which eleven were in the Veikkausliiga.

Later, Bäckman was loaned out by FC Honka to FC Haka, from 12 March 2009 to August 2009.

On 4 November 2009, FF Jaro signed Bäckman for free. He signed a one-year contract with the club including an option to extend for another year.

On 1 March 2017, Bäckman had to play as a goalkeeper in a Finnish Cup match against HJK after HIFK goalkeeper Carljohan Eriksson was sent off in the 86th minute causing a penalty kick. Bäckman saved the penalty.
