= FC Futura =

Finnish football club

FC Futura Porvoo
- Full name: FC Futura
- Nickname: Futura
- Founded: 1992
- Ground: Porvoon keskuskenttä, Porvoo; Finland
- Chairman: Juha Kolehmainen
- Head Coach: Cihan Gökcil
- League: Kakkonen
- 2022: 10th – Kakkonen (Group A)
Home colours

FC Futura (abbreviated Futura) is a football club from Porvoo in Finland. The club was formed in 1992 and their home ground is at the Porvoon keskuskenttä. The other venue used by the club is the Porvoon Pallokenttä. The men's first team currently plays in the Kakkonen (Second Division). The Chairman of FC Futura is Matti Valasti.

== Background ==
FC Futura was established in 1992 and is now recognised as Porvoo's largest football club. Founder Members of the club's Committee include Alvari Ari Juha, Markku Kemppainen and Vesa Hautala.

The club has played three seasons in the Kakkonen (Second Division), the third tier of Finnish football in 2002–03 and 2009 to date.

FC Futura is strongly focused on the activities of junior club players, with 90% of members coming from the youth section of the club.

== Season to season ==
Season	Level	Division	Section	Administration	Position	Movements
1997	Tier 5	Nelonen (Third Division)	Group 3	Helsinki & Uusimaa (SPL Uusimaa)	4th	
1998	Tier 5	Nelonen (Third Division)	Group 4	Helsinki & Uusimaa (SPL Uusimaa)	1st	Promoted
1999	Tier 4	Kolmonen (Third Division)	Section 2	Helsinki & Uusimaa (SPL Uusimaa)	6th	
2000	Tier 4	Kolmonen (Third Division)	Section 2	Helsinki & Uusimaa (SPL Uusimaa)	4th	
2001	Tier 4	Kolmonen (Third Division)	Section 2	Helsinki & Uusimaa (SPL Uusimaa)	2nd	Promoted
2002	Tier 3	Kakkonen (Second Division)	East Group	Finnish FA (Suomen Pallolitto)	8th	
2003	Tier 3	Kakkonen (Second Division)	South Group	Finnish FA (Suomen Pallolitto)	12th	Relegated
2004	Tier 4	Kolmonen (Third Division)	Section 3	Helsinki & Uusimaa (SPL Helsinki)	1st	Play-offs
2005	Tier 4	Kolmonen (Third Division)	Section 2	Helsinki & Uusimaa (SPL Uusimaa)	2nd	
2006	Tier 4	Kolmonen (Third Division)	Section 3	Helsinki & Uusimaa (SPL Helsinki)	3rd	
2007	Tier 4	Kolmonen (Third Division)	Section 3	Helsinki & Uusimaa (SPL Uusimaa)	3rd	
2008	Tier 4	Kolmonen (Third Division)	Section 2	Helsinki & Uusimaa (SPL Uusimaa)	1st	Promoted
2009	Tier 3	Kakkonen (Second Division)	Group A	Finnish FA (Suomen Pallolitto)	6th	
2010	Tier 3	Kakkonen (Second Division)	Group A	Finnish FA (Suomen Pallolitto)	8th	
2011	Tier 3	Kakkonen (Second Division)	Group A	Finnish FA (Suomen Pallolitto)	7th	
2012	Tier 3	Kakkonen (Second Division)	East Group	Finnish FA (Suomen Pallolitto)	7th	
2013	Tier 3	Kakkonen (Second Division)	East Group	Finnish FA (Suomen Pallolitto)	7th	
2014	Tier 3	Kakkonen (Second Division)	East Group	Finnish FA (Suomen Pallolitto)	4th	
2015	Tier 3	Kakkonen (Second Division)	East Group	Finnish FA (Suomen Pallolitto)	4th	
2016	Tier 3	Kakkonen (Second Division)	Group A	Finnish FA (Suomen Pallolitto)	10th	Relegated
2017	Tier 4	Kolmonen (Third Division)	South Group B	Helsinki & Uusimaa (SPL Uusimaa)	2nd	Play-offs
2018	Tier 4	Kolmonen (Third Division)	South Group C	Helsinki & Uusimaa (SPL Uusimaa)	2nd	Play-offs
2019	Tier 4	Kolmonen (Third Division)	South Group C	Helsinki & Uusimaa (SPL Uusimaa)	3rd	Play-offs
2020	Tier 4	Kolmonen (Third Division)	South Group C	Helsinki & Uusimaa (SPL Uusimaa)	2nd	Play-offs
2021	Tier 4	Kolmonen (Third Division)	South Group B	Helsinki & Uusimaa (SPL Uusimaa)	1st	Promoted
2022	Tier 3	Kakkonen (Second Division)	Group A	Finnish FA (Suomen Pallolitto)	10th	
2023	Tier 3	Kakkonen (Second Division)	Group A	Finnish FA (Suomen Pallolitto)		

- 12 seasons in Kakkonen
- 13 seasons in Kolmonen

== Current squad ==
As of 26 October 2023

Note: Flags indicate national team as defined under FIFA eligibility rules; some limited exceptions apply. Players may hold more than one non-FIFA nationality.

No.	Pos.	Nation	Player
1	GK	FIN	Robert Barton
3	DF	FIN	Leo Kurvinen
4	DF	FIN	Jani Kaukomaa
5	MF	FIN	Jesse Sundström
6	MF	SOM	Abdulkadir Said Ahmed
8	MF	FIN	Simon Stenstrand
9	FW	TUR	Mehmet Gökcil
10	MF	FIN	Aaron Lindholm
11	FW	FIN	Matias Viitanen
12	GK	FIN	Paulus Haapniemi
13	MF	FIN	Lassi Kouri
14	MF	FIN	Joni Vis
15	DF	FIN	Patrick Ntare

No.	Pos.	Nation	Player
16	MF	FIN	Tore Hirvonen
17	FW	ITA	Michele Desalegen
18	DF	FIN	Kasper Eriksson
19	FW	FIN	Anton Britschgi
20	MF	GAM	Saloum Faal
21	DF	FIN	Nico Eerola
22	MF	FIN	Oliver Henrichson
23	MF	FIN	Valtteri Rouvila
26	GK	FIN	Hugo Råstedt
27	MF	FIN	Alejandro Löfman
28	MF	FIN	Milo Formisano
35	DF	FIN	Elton Maloku

== Club structure ==
FC Futura run a number of teams including 3 men's teams, 1 ladies team, 11 boys team and 7 girls teams. The club also runs an academy the name of which has recently been changed from Futura Academy to the Itä-Uudenmaan Akatemia (IUA). This reflects the fact that the academy players represent several different clubs.

== 2010 season ==
FC Futura Men's Team are competing in Group A (Lohko A) of the Kakkonen administered by the Football Association of Finland (Suomen Palloliitto) . This is the third highest tier in the Finnish football system. In 2009 FC Futura finished in sixth position in their Kakkonen section.

FC Futura / 2 are participating in Section 6 (Lohko 6) of the Kutonen administered by the Uusimaa SPL.

Futura A are a new team participating in Section 5 (Lohko 5) of the Kutonen administered by the Uusimaa SPL.

== References and sources ==
- Official website
- Finnish Wikipedia
- Suomen Cup (archived)
