= Salon Palloilijat =

Finnish sports club

SalPa
- Full name: Salon Palloilijat
- Nicknames: SalPa; The Swans
- Founded: 1956
- Ground: Salon Urheilupuisto, Salo; Finland
- Chairman: Vesa Valkonen
- Head Coach: Ville Ulanen
- League: Ykkönen
- 2026: Ykkönen, 3rd of 12
Home colours	Away colours

Salon Palloilijat (abbreviated SalPa) is a sports club from Salo in Finland. The club is popularly known as The Swans (Joutsenlauma in Finnish). SalPa was formed in 1956 and their home ground is at the Salon Urheilupuisto. The men's football first team currently plays in the third-tier Ykkönen. The Chairman of SalPa is Toni Tammi.

The club currently has sections covering football, floorball, figure skating and basketball.

== Background ==
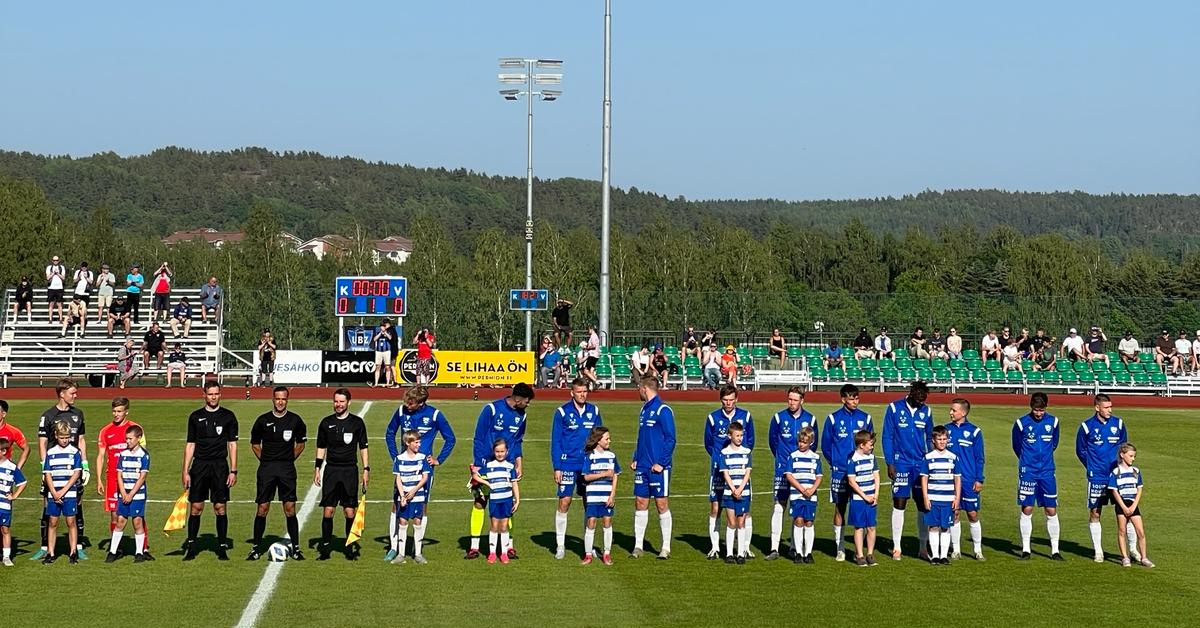
SalPa before a Finnish Cup match against Inter Turku in Salo Sports Park on 21 June 2023

Salon Palloilijat was established in 1956 and the club's first taste of success was in 1960 when the gained promotion to the Suomisarjaa (Finland League) which at that time was the second tier of Finnish football. Their success at this level was short-lived but just over forty years later in 2001 they played one season in the Ykkönen (First Division) which is the current second tier.

SalPa have had four periods covering 25 seasons in the Kakkonen (Second Division), the third tier of Finnish football from 1978 to 1979, 1982–90, 1996–2000 and 2002 to the current day.

The club's highest attendance is 2,984 spectators (SalPa-Futistähdet 21.6.1999). The largest attendance for a league match is 835 spectators (SalPa-AC Vantaa, 2001, Ykkönen – First Division).

SalPa have historically invested heavily in youth activities and continues to provide a thriving junior section.

After the 2022 Kakkonen season, SalPa won the promotion to the second tier Ykkönen.

== Current squad ==
As of 27 July 2026

Note: Flags indicate national team as defined under FIFA eligibility rules; some limited exceptions apply. Players may hold more than one non-FIFA nationality.

No.	Pos.	Nation	Player
1	GK	FIN	Joonas Koski
3	DF	FIN	Joonas Meura
4	DF	FIN	Topias Dementjeff
5	MF	FIN	Otto Rautiainen
6	DF	CAN	Joshué Ndakala
7	FW	FIN	Ermal Rrustemi
8	FW	FIN	Oskari Jakonen
9	FW	CAN	Mauro Lulli
10	FW	FIN	Gezim Voca
11	FW	FIN	Endrit Rrustemi
12	GK	FIN	Onni Rintamäki
13	MF	FIN	Jasper Kostian
14	MF	FIN	Antti Ranta
15	DF	FIN	Juho Heikkilä

No.	Pos.	Nation	Player
17	DF	CIV	Koble Yao
18	MF	FIN	Joni Kauko
19	DF	FIN	Niklas Jokiniemi (on loan from PK-35)
20	MF	FIN	Olli Jakonen
21	DF	FIN	Juuso Kostian
22	FW	JPN	Shotaro Kadowaki
23	DF	FIN	Reino Ruponen
24	MF	JPN	Yu Miyazaki
27	DF	BFA	Drissa Traoré
28	MF	GHA	Sadat Seidu
30	GK	FIN	Anton Munukka
33	DF	FIN	Severi Pöysä
34	MF	FIN	Mido Väkeväinen
-	FW	AFG	Mostafa Mohammadi

== Season to season ==
- 6 season in Suomensarja/Ykkönen/Ykkösliiga
- 50 seasons in Maakuntasarja/Kakkonen
- 14 seasons in Kolmonen/4. divisioona
- 1 seasons in 4. divisioona

Season	Level	Division	Section	Administration	Position	Movements
1956	Tier 3	Maakuntasarja (Regional League)	South Group I	Finnish FA (Suomen Palloliitto)	5th	
1957	Tier 3	Maakuntasarja (Regional League)	West Group I	Finnish FA (Suomen Palloliitto)	7th	
1958	Tier 3	Maakuntasarja (Regional League)	Group 3	Finnish FA (Suomen Palloliitto)	4th	
1959	Tier 3	Maakuntasarja (Regional League)	Group 3	Finnish FA (Suomen Palloliitto)	1st	Promoted
1960	Tier 2	Suomensarja (Finland Series)		Finnish FA (Suomen Palloliitto)	11th	Relegated
1961	Tier 3	Maakuntasarja (Regional League)	Group 3	Finnish FA (Suomen Palloliitto)	3rd	
1962	Tier 3	Maakuntasarja (Regional League)	Group 2	Finnish FA (Suomen Palloliitto)	6th	
1963	Tier 3	Maakuntasarja (Regional League)	Group 2	Finnish FA (Suomen Palloliitto)	3rd	
1964	Tier 3	Maakuntasarja (Regional League)	Group 2	Finnish FA (Suomen Palloliitto)	4th	
1965	Tier 3	Maakuntasarja (Regional League)	Group 2	Finnish FA (Suomen Palloliitto)	2nd	
1966	Tier 3	Maakuntasarja (Regional League)	Group 3	Finnish FA (Suomen Palloliitto)	4th	
1967	Tier 3	Maakuntasarja (Regional League)	Group 2	Finnish FA (Suomen Palloliitto)	4th	
1968	Tier 3	Maakuntasarja (Regional League)	Group 3	Finnish FA (Suomen Palloliitto)	7th	
1969	Tier 3	Maakuntasarja (Regional League)	Group 2	Finnish FA (Suomen Palloliitto)	9th	Relegated
1970	Tier 4	4. divisioona (Fourth Division)	Group 3	Finnish FA (Suomen Palloliitto)	2nd	
1971	Tier 4	4. divisioona (Fourth Division)	Group 2	Finnish FA (Suomen Palloliitto)	4th	
1972	Tier 4	4. divisioona (Fourth Division)	Group 4	Finnish FA (Suomen Palloliitto)	3rd	
1973	Tier 5	4. divisioona (Fourth Division)	Group 4	Finnish FA (Suomen Palloliitto)	1st	Promoted
1974	Tier 4	3. divisioona (Third Division)	Group 2	Finnish FA (Suomen Palloliitto)	3rd	
1975	Tier 4	3. divisioona (Third Division)	Group 3	Finnish FA (Suomen Palloliitto)	2nd	
1976	Tier 4	3. divisioona (Third Division)	Group 3	Finnish FA (Suomen Palloliitto)	2nd	
1977	Tier 4	3. divisioona (Third Division)	Group 3	Finnish FA (Suomen Palloliitto)	1st	Promoted
1978	Tier 3	2. divisioona (Second Division)	West Group	Finnish FA (Suomen Palloliitto)	6th	
1979	Tier 3	2. divisioona (Second Division)	West Group	Finnish FA (Suomen Palloliitto)	9th	Relegation Playoff - Relegated
1980	Tier 4	3. divisioona (Third Division)	Group 2	Finnish FA (Suomen Palloliitto)	3rd	
1981	Tier 4	3. divisioona (Third Division)	Group 4	Finnish FA (Suomen Palloliitto)	2nd	Promotion Playoff - Promoted
1982	Tier 3	2. divisioona (Second Division)	West Group	Finnish FA (Suomen Palloliitto)	3rd	
1983	Tier 3	2. divisioona (Second Division)	West Group	Finnish FA (Suomen Palloliitto)	4th	
1984	Tier 3	2. divisioona (Second Division)	West Group	Finnish FA (Suomen Palloliitto)	7th	
1985	Tier 3	2. divisioona (Second Division)	West Group	Finnish FA (Suomen Palloliitto)	9th	
1986	Tier 3	2. divisioona (Second Division)	West Group	Finnish FA (Suomen Palloliitto)	6th	
1987	Tier 3	2. divisioona (Second Division)	West Group	Finnish FA (Suomen Palloliitto)	8th	
1988	Tier 3	2. divisioona (Second Division)	West Group	Finnish FA (Suomen Palloliitto)	4th	
1989	Tier 3	2. divisioona (Second Division)	West Group	Finnish FA (Suomen Palloliitto)	7th	
1990	Tier 3	2. divisioona (Second Division)	West Group	Finnish FA (Suomen Palloliitto)	11th	Relegated
1991	Tier 4	3. divisioona (Third Division)	Group 3	Finnish FA (Suomen Palloliitto)	5th	
1992	Tier 4	Kolmonen (Third Division)	Group 2	Finnish FA (Suomen Palloliitto)	6th	
1993	Tier 4	Kolmonen (Third Division)	Group 3	Finnish FA (Suomen Palloliitto)	7th	
1994	Tier 4	Kolmonen (Third Division)	Section 3	Finnish FA (Suomen Palloliitto)	3rd	
1995	Tier 4	Kolmonen (Third Division)	Section 3	Finnish FA (Suomen Palloliitto)	1st	Promoted
1996	Tier 3	Kakkonen (Second Division)	South Group	Finnish FA (Suomen Palloliitto)	4th	
1997	Tier 3	Kakkonen (Second Division)	South Group	Finnish FA (Suomen Palloliitto)	6th	
1998	Tier 3	Kakkonen (Second Division)	South Group	Finnish FA (Suomen Palloliitto)	3rd	
1999	Tier 3	Kakkonen (Second Division)	West Group	Finnish FA (Suomen Palloliitto)	5th	
2000	Tier 3	Kakkonen (Second Division)	West Group	Finnish FA (Suomen Palloliitto)	1st	Promoted
2001	Tier 2	Ykkönen (First Division)	South Group	Finnish FA (Suomen Palloliitto)	10th	Relegated
2002	Tier 3	Kakkonen (Second Division)	West Group	Finnish FA (Suomen Palloliitto)	2nd	
2003	Tier 3	Kakkonen (Second Division)	West Group	Finnish FA (Suomen Palloliitto)	4th	
2004	Tier 3	Kakkonen (Second Division)	West Group	Finnish FA (Suomen Palloliitto)	6th	
2005	Tier 3	Kakkonen (Second Division)	West Group	Finnish FA (Suomen Palloliitto)	1st	Play-offs
2006	Tier 3	Kakkonen (Second Division)	Group B	Finnish FA (Suomen Palloliitto)	2nd	
2007	Tier 3	Kakkonen (Second Division)	Group B	Finnish FA (Suomen Palloliitto)	5th	
2008	Tier 3	Kakkonen (Second Division)	Group B	Finnish FA (Suomen Palloliitto)	7th	
2009	Tier 3	Kakkonen (Second Division)	Group B	Finnish FA (Suomen Palloliitto)	7th	
2010	Tier 3	Kakkonen (Second Division)	Group B	Finnish FA (Suomen Palloliitto)	2nd	
2011	Tier 3	Kakkonen (Second Division)	Group B	Finnish FA (Suomen Palloliitto)	5th	
2012	Tier 3	Kakkonen (Second Division)	Southern	Finnish FA (Suomen Palloliitto)	3rd	
2013	Tier 3	Kakkonen (Second Division)	Southern	Finnish FA (Suomen Palloliitto)		
2014	Tier 3	Kakkonen (Second Division)	Southern	Finnish FA (Suomen Palloliitto)	6th	
2015	Tier 3	Kakkonen (Second Division)	Western	Finnish FA (Suomen Palloliitto)	3rd	
2016	Tier 3	Kakkonen (Second Division)	Group B	Finnish FA (Suomen Palloliitto)	7th	
2017	Tier 3	Kakkonen (Second Division)	Group B	Finnish FA (Suomen Palloliitto)	3rd	
2018	Tier 3	Kakkonen (Second Division)	Group B	Finnish FA (Suomen Palloliitto)	2nd	
2019	Tier 3	Kakkonen (Second Division)	Group B	Finnish FA (Suomen Palloliitto)	5th	
2020	Tier 3	Kakkonen (Second Division)	Group B	Finnish FA (Suomen Palloliitto)	9th	
2021	Tier 3	Kakkonen (Second Division)	Group B	Finnish FA (Suomen Palloliitto)	6th	
2022	Tier 3	Kakkonen (Second Division)	Group B	Finnish FA (Suomen Palloliitto)	1st (Champions)	Promoted
2023	Tier 2	Ykkönen (First Division)		Finnish FA (Suomen Palloliitto)	7th	
2024	Tier 2	Ykkösliiga (First Division)		Finnish FA (Suomen Palloliitto)	8th	
2025	Tier 2	Ykkösliiga (First Division)		Finnish FA (Suomen Palloliitto)	10th	Relegated
2026	Tier 3	Ykkönen (Second Division)		Finnish FA (Suomen Palloliitto)	3rd	

== Club structure ==
SalPa currently has 1 men's team, 1 ladies teams, 7 boys teams and 7 girls team. The club organises various activities for its young players including skill and ability schools, tournaments and futsal.

== References and sources ==
- Official Website
- Men's First Team Website
- Salon Palloilijat Juniorit Website
- Suomen Cup
- Salon Palloilijat Facebook
