= Timo Furuholm =

Finnish footballer and politician (born 1987)

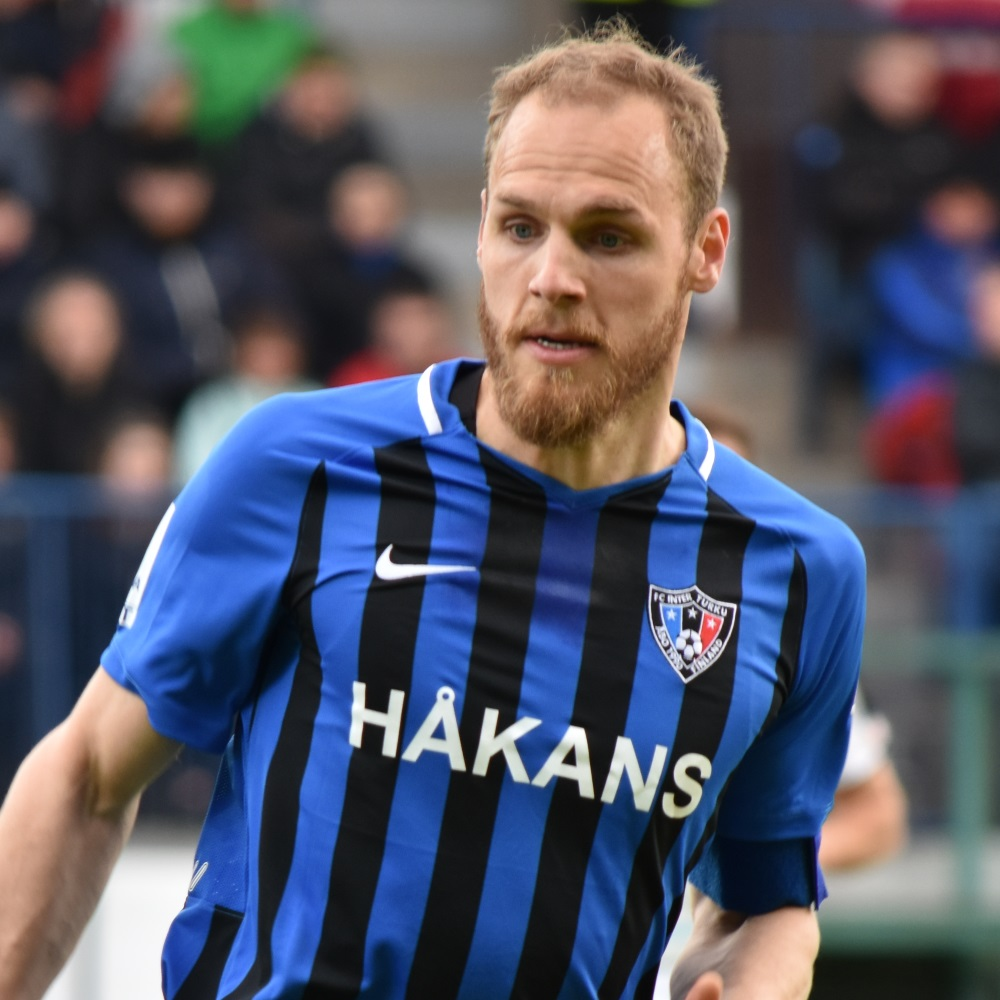
- Timo Furuholm during a match in 2018 in Turku

Personal information
- Date of birth: 11 October 1987 (age 39)
- Place of birth: Pori, Finland
- Height: 1.85 m (6 ft 1 in)
- Position: Forward

Youth career
- –2002: Toejoen Veikot
- 2003: Jazz

Senior career*
Years	Team	Apps	(Gls)
2003	Jazz	4	(0)
2004	Musan Salama	21	(17)
2005–2011	Inter Turku	95	(40)
2012–2013	Fortuna Düsseldorf	9	(0)
2013	→ Hallescher FC (loan)	16	(8)
2013–2016	Hallescher FC	87	(27)
2017–2021	Inter Turku	131	(45)
Total		363	(137)

International career
	Finland U17	3	(1)
2008	Finland U21	2	(0)
2010–2013	Finland	10	(2)
Medal record
Finland national football team
Second place	Baltic Cup	2012
FC Inter Turku
Second place	Finnish League Cup	2007
First place	Finnish League Cup	2008
First place	Veikkausliiga	2008
First place	Finnish Cup	2009
Second place	Veikkausliiga	2011
Hallescher FC
Second place	Saxony-Anhalt Cup	2014
First place	Saxony-Anhalt Cup	2015
First place	Saxony-Anhalt Cup	2016
- * Club domestic league appearances and goals

Timo Furuholm (born 11 October 1987) is a Finnish politician and a former professional football forward. He is currently a member of the Parliament of Finland, for the Left Alliance. Furuholm was born in Pori, Finland where he started his senior career in local FC Jazz. He made his Veikkausliiga debut at age 15 in 2003.

Furuholm made his international debut for Finland in January 2010, at the age of 22.

== Club career ==
=== Early career ===
In 2003, Furuholm made his Veikkausliiga debut for FC Jazz, playing against FF Jaro at the age of 16. At the time, he was the youngest player ever to make an appearance in the Finnish top flight. In 2004, he played for another Pori based team, Musan Salama in the Finnish II division, making 21 appearances and scoring 17 goals.

=== FC Inter Turku ===
In 2005, he signed with FC Inter Turku. He has since suffered from multiple injuries. During the 2007 season he made 14 appearances and two goals for Inter. In the next season he missed three months because of a knee injury, and was only able to make nine appearances and four goals. The following season he was finally able to play the whole season without injuries, making in total of 23 appearances and scoring impressive 11 league goals. He however missed almost the whole 2010 season as he injured himself in the early days of the season (only four appearances, no goals). The 2011 season was finally his breakthrough, as he went on scoring 22 league goals and only losing by one goal to Kimmo Tarkkio and Valeri Popovitch as the record goalscorer in Veikkausliiga. After the 2011 season, his contract with Inter expired and he became a free agent.

=== Fortuna Düsseldorf ===
On 10 January 2012, it was announced that 2. Bundesliga side Fortuna Düsseldorf had signed Furuholm, with a contract running until June 2014. A year later, he signed for Hallescher FC on loan, joining his compatriot, Kristian Kojola. He scored two minutes into his debut for the club, a 1–1 draw with Stuttgarter Kickers, and ended the season with eight goals, making him Halle's top scorer for the season.

=== Hallescher ===
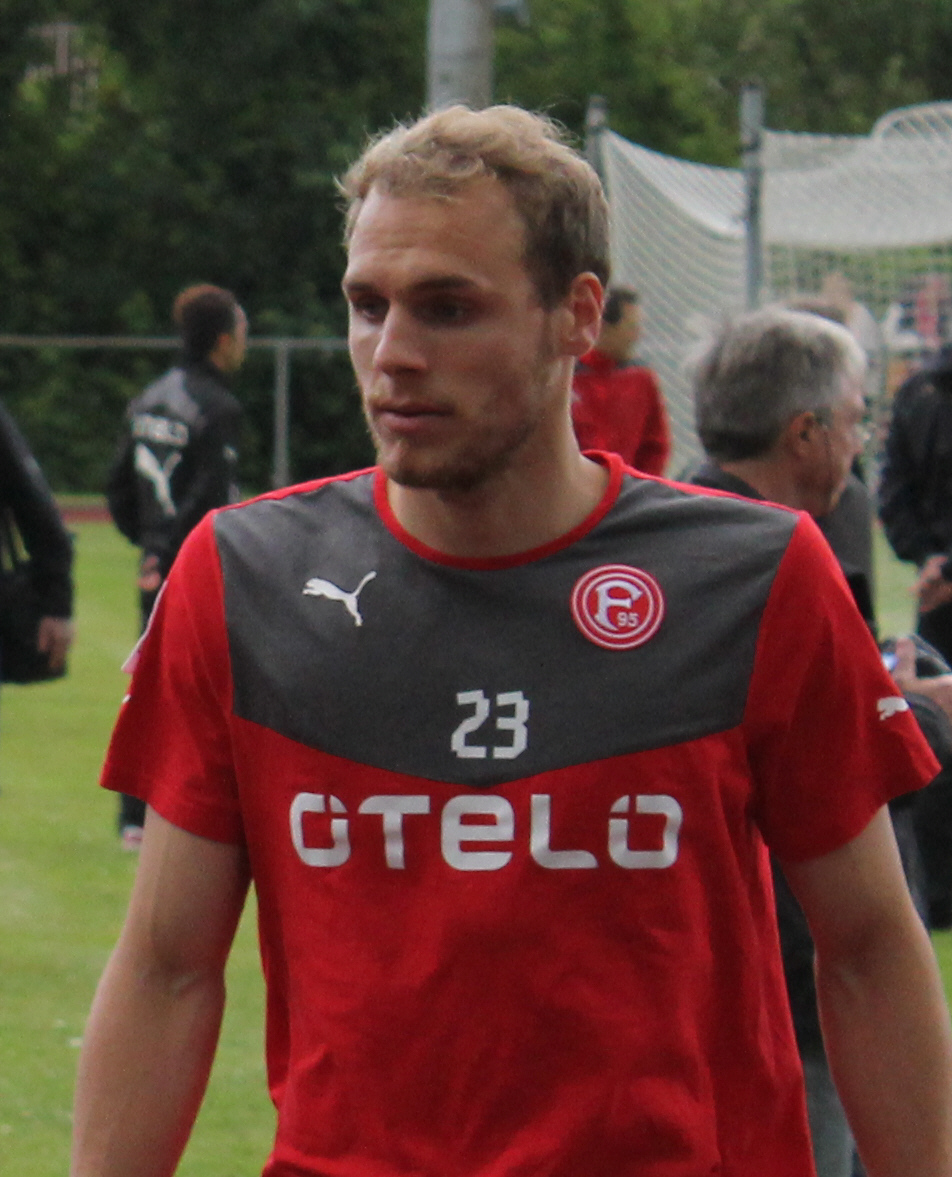
Timo Furuholm during a training match in 2013 in Esens.

On 26 August 2013, Hallescher FC made the move permanent and announced they had signed Furuholm on a two-year deal. During season 2013–14 he scored 12 goals and was the best scorer of his team and eight best in the league.

=== Return to FC Inter Turku ===
On 7 December 2016 it was announced that Furuholm would return to Inter Turku.

== International career ==
Furuholm made his international debut for the Finnish national team in January 2010, as he came from the bench to replace Hermanni Vuorinen in a friendly match against South Korea at Málaga, Spain. He scored his first national goal on 10 August 2011 in a friendly against Latvia and second goal on 20 February 2012 in match against Austria. He was chosen for the starting line up for the first time on 25 May 2012 in a match against Turkey.

== Outside football ==
In 2020, Furuholm started social science studies at the University of Turku.

In 2021 Finnish municipal elections, Furuholm became a member of the Turku city council for the Left Alliance, receiving 865 votes in his first election. He became a member of the Parliament of Finland in 2023 Finnish parliamentary election.

== Personal life ==
Timo Furuholm is the son of former Finnish footballer and Eurosport commentator Tapio Furuholm. He is divorced and has a daughter who was born in 2014. Since 2024 Furuholm has been in relationship with the Left Alliance party leader Minja Koskela.

== Career statistics ==
=== Club ===
As of 29 April 2017

Club	Season	League			Domestic Cups (Note: Includes Suomen Cup, Finnish League Cup, DFB-Pokal and Sachsen-Anhalt-Pokal)		Europe		Total	
Club	Season	Division	Apps	Goals	Apps	Goals	Apps	Goals	Apps	Goals
Jazz	2003	Veikkausliiga	4	0	0	0	–		4	0
MuSa	2004	Kakkonen	18	17	0	0	–		18	17
VG-62	2004	Ykkönen	2	1	0	0	–		2	1
Inter Turku	2005	Veikkausliiga	5	1	0	0	0	0	5	1
Inter Turku	2006	Veikkausliiga	7	0	0	0	–		7	0
Inter Turku	2007	Veikkausliiga	14	2	0	0	–		14	2
Inter Turku	2008	Veikkausliiga	9	4	0	0	–		9	4
Inter Turku	2009	Veikkausliiga	23	11	0	0	2 (Note: Includes UEFA Champions League)	0	25	11
Inter Turku	2010	Veikkausliiga	4	0	5	3	1 (Note: Includes UEFA Europa League)	0	10	3
Inter Turku	2011	Veikkausliiga	33	22	3	1	–		10	3
Inter Turku	Total		95	40	8	4	3	0	107	44
Fortuna Düsseldorf	2011–12	2. Bundesliga	9	0	0	0	–		9	0
Fortuna Düsseldorf II	2011–12	Regionalliga West	1	0	–		–		1	0
Fortuna Düsseldorf II	2012–13	Regionalliga West	6	0	–		–		6	0
Fortuna Düsseldorf II	Total		7	0	0	0	0	0	7	0
Hallescher FC (loan)	2012–13	3. Liga	16	8	0	0	–		16	8
Hallescher FC	2013–14	3. Liga	32	12	0	0	–		32	12
Hallescher FC	2014–15	3. Liga	35	12	2	1	–		37	13
Hallescher FC	2015–16	3. Liga	18	3	1	0	–		19	3
Hallescher FC	2016–17	3. Liga	2	0	2	3	–		4	3
Hallescher FC	Total		87	27	5	4	0	0	92	31
Inter Turku	2017	Veikkausliiga	31	9	7	5	–		38	14
Inter Turku	2018	Veikkausliiga	29	9	7	3	–		36	12
Inter Turku	2019	Veikkausliiga	25	10	4	2	2	1	31	13
Inter Turku	2020	Veikkausliiga	21	10	7	3	1	0	29	13
Inter Turku	2021	Veikkausliiga	25	7	5	2	2 (Note: Includes UEFA Europa Conference League)	0	32	9
Inter Turku	Total		131	45	30	15	5	1	166	61
Career total			369	143	43	23	8	1	420	167

=== International ===
As of 15 October 2013

National team	Year	Apps	Goals
Finland
Finland	2010	1	0
Finland	2011	4	1
Finland	2012	3	1
Finland	2013	2	0
Total		10	2

=== International goals ===
#	Date	Location	Opponent	Score	Result	Competition
1.	10 August 2011	Riga	Latvia	2–0	2–0	Friendly
2.	29 February 2012	Klagenfurt	Austria	1–3	1–3	Friendly

== Honours and achievements ==
Inter Turku

- Veikkausliiga: 2008
- Finnish Cup: 2009, 2018
- Finnish League Cup: 2008

Hallescher FC

- Saxony-Anhalt Cup: 2015, 2016

Individual

- Veikkausliiga Player of the Month: May 2011,
- Veikkausliiga Top Scorer: 2011
- Veikkausliiga Striker of the Year: 2011
- Veikkausliiga Team of the Year: 2020
