= 2009 Ykkönen =

Ykkönen
- Season: 2009
- Champions: AC Oulu
- Promoted: AC Oulu
- Relegated: TP-47; Atlantis FC; FC Kiisto

League tables for teams participating in Ykkönen, the second tier of the Finnish Soccer League system, in 2009.

== League table ==
Pos	Team	Pld	W	D	L	GF	GA	GD	Pts	Promotion or relegation
1	AC Oulu (C, P)	26	16	5	5	57	24	+33	53	Promotion to Veikkausliiga
2	KPV	26	15	6	5	32	25	+7	51	Qualification to Promotion playoffs
3	FC Viikingit	26	15	5	6	48	19	+29	50	
4	FC PoPa	26	11	8	7	53	39	+14	41	
5	FC KooTeePee	26	11	6	9	23	21	+2	39	
6	FC Hämeenlinna	26	10	8	8	36	33	+3	38	
7	PS Kemi	26	12	2	12	36	46	−10	38	
8	Klubi-04	26	10	7	9	46	45	+1	37	
9	PK-35	26	10	5	11	31	30	+1	35	
10	Jippo	26	8	5	13	28	39	−11	29	
11	TPV	26	7	7	12	28	38	−10	28	
12	TP-47 (R)	26	7	6	13	29	41	−12	27	Relegation to Kakkonen
13	Atlantis FC (R)	26	6	3	17	26	50	−24	21	Relegation to Kakkonen
14	FC Kiisto (R)	26	5	5	16	25	48	−23	20	Relegation to Kakkonen

(C) Champions; (P) Promoted; (R) Relegated

=== Promotion play-offs ===
JJK as 13th placed team of 2009 Veikkausliiga and KPV as runners-up of the 2009 Ykkönen competed in a two-legged play-offs for one spot in the 2010 Veikkausliiga. JJK won the play-offs by 5–3 and remained in Veikkausliiga.

21 October 2009
15:30 EEST

KPV	2–3	JJK
Itälä 24'; Linjala 61'		Kari 40'; Lahtinen 49'; Nam 69'

Kokkolan Keskuskenttä, Kokkola

25 October 2009
14:00 EET

JJK	2–1	KPV
Lahtinen 61'; Nam 68'		Kalliokoski 87'

Harjun stadion, Jyväskylä

== Sources ==
- Finnish FA (Suomen Palloliitto - Ykkönen 2009)
