= Ats Purje =

Estonian footballer

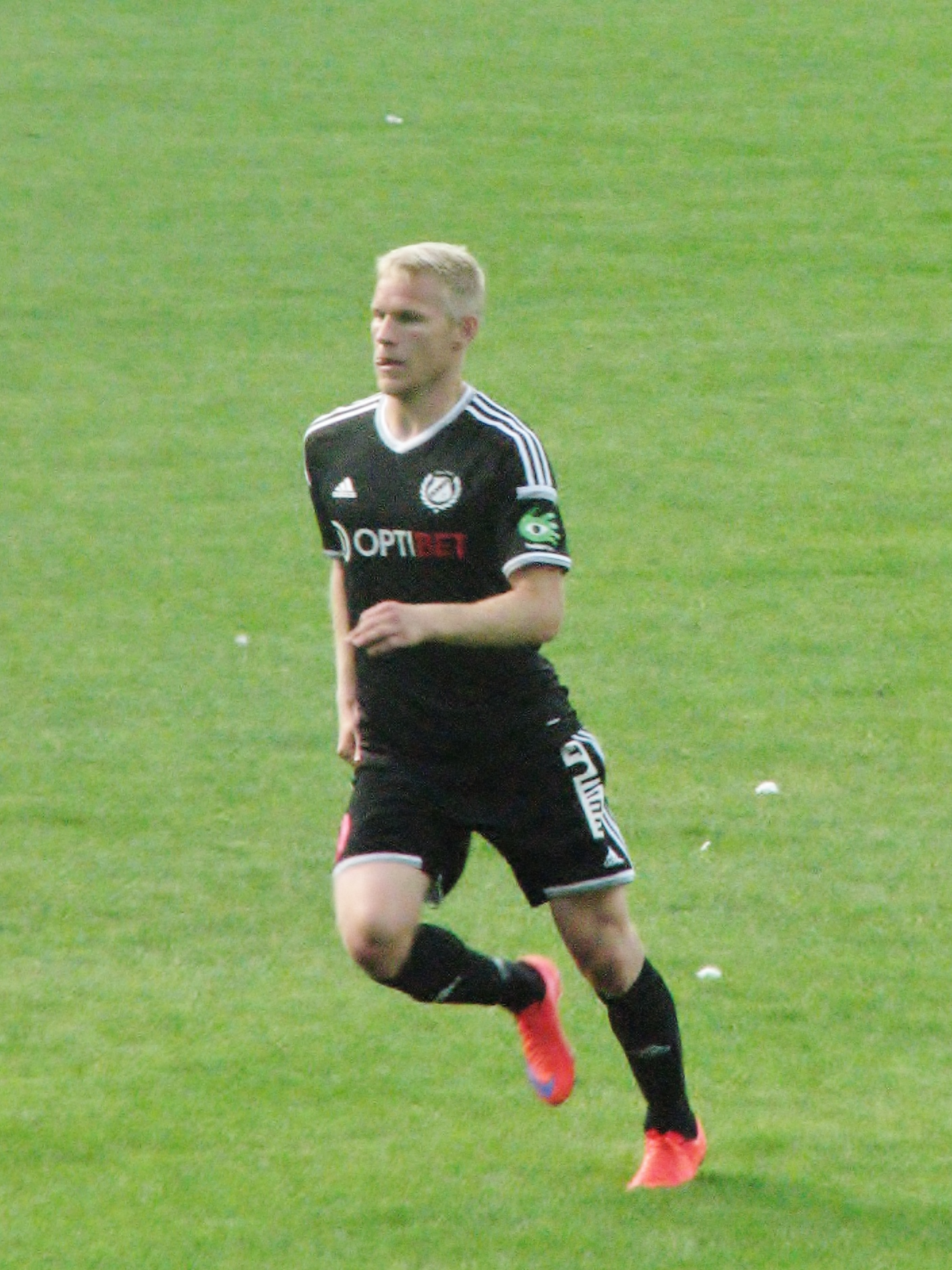
- Purje with Nõmme Kalju in 2015

Personal information
- Full name: Ats Purje
- Date of birth: 3 August 1985 (age 41)
- Place of birth: Tallinn, then part of Estonian SSR, Soviet Union
- Height: 1.80 m (5 ft 11 in)
- Position: Forward

Youth career
- SC Real

Senior career*
Years	Team	Apps	(Gls)
2002	Maardu	8	(7)
2003	M.C. Tallinn	10	(8)
2003–2007	Levadia II	25	(8)
2003–2007	Levadia	86	(33)
2007–2009	Inter Turku	40	(11)
2010–2011	AEP	26	(5)
2011	Ethnikos Achna	4	(1)
2012–2015	KuPS	76	(19)
2015–2016	Nõmme Kalju	61	(30)
2016–2020	KuPS	93	(18)
2021–2026	Tallinna Kalev	162	(53)

International career^{‡}
2002–2003	Estonia U19	6	(3)
2003	Estonia U20	1	(0)
2003–2007	Estonia U21	11	(0)
2006–2018	Estonia	69	(10)
- * Club domestic league appearances and goals as of 10 October 2026 ‡ National team caps and goals as of 6 October 2019

Ats Purje (born 3 August 1985) is an Estonian former professional footballer who played as an forward.

== Club career ==
=== Early career ===
Purje began playing football at Tallinna Jalgpallikool, where he was coached by Aivar Tiidus. He made his senior league debut in the IV liiga with SC Real in 2001.

=== Levadia ===
In 2003, Purje joined Meistriliiga club Levadia. He made his debut in the Meistriliiga on 15 March 2003, playing for Levadia's Tallinn-based team against the Maardu-based Levadia team in a 0–1 away loss. Purje scored his first Meistriliiga goal on 13 May 2003, in a 9–3 away win over Kuressaare. In July 2003, Purje was moved to the Maardu team. His first trophy with Levadia came in the 2003–04 Estonian Cup. Purje won his first Meistriliiga title in the 2004 season. He won two more Meistriliiga titles in 2006 and 2007, and two more Estonian Cups in 2005 and 2007.

=== FC Inter ===
In December 2007, Purje signed a two-year contract with Veikkausliiga club FC Inter. On 12 April 2008, he won his first trophy with FC Inter in the 2008 Finnish League Cup. Purje made his debut in the Veikkausliiga on 27 April 2008, and scored his side's first goal in a 3–1 home victory over RoPS. He won the Veikkausliiga in the 2008 season. On 31 October 2009, Purje came on as a 79th-minute substitute in FC Inter's 2–1 victory over Tampere United in the Finnish Cup final, winning his third trophy with the club.

=== AEP ===
In June 2010, Purje signed a one-year contract with Cypriot First Division club AEP, with an option to extend it for another year. He made his debut in the Cypriot First Division on 29 August 2010, and scored his side's only goal in a 1–2 loss to Ethnikos Achna.

=== Ethnikos Achna ===
In May 2011, Purje signed for Ethnikos Achna. He made his debut for the club on 27 August 2011, in a 0–1 loss to Anorthosis.

=== KuPS ===
On 3 April 2012, Purje signed a one-year contract with Veikkausliiga club KuPS. In September, he signed a two-year contract extension that would keep him with the club until 2014. Purje was his side's top scorer in the 2012 season with six goals and was named the club's Player of the Year. He was once again his club's top scorer in the 2014 season, with nine goals.

=== Nõmme Kalju ===
On 9 February 2015, Purje signed a three-year contract with Meistriliiga club Nõmme Kalju. On 30 May 2015, he won his fourth Estonian Cup. Purje was Nõmme Kalju's top scorer in the Meistriliiga for two consecutive seasons, in 2015 and 2016.

=== Return to KuPS ===
On 27 December 2016, Purje returned to KuPS for an undisclosed fee, on a one-year deal with an option to extend the contract for another year.

=== Tallinna Kalev ===
For the 2021 Season Purje returned to Estonia signing for the Esiliiga club Tallinna Kalev while also managing their under-21 team in the Esiliiga B.

== International career ==
Purje began his youth career in 2002 with the Estonia under-19 team. He also represented the under-20 and under-21 national sides, amassing 18 youth appearances and scoring 3 goals overall.

Purje made his senior international debut for Estonia on 11 October 2006, replacing Teet Allas in the 81st minute of a 0–2 away loss to Russia in a UEFA Euro 2008 qualifying match. He scored his first international goal on 20 August 2008, in a 2–1 home win over Malta in a friendly. Purje came on as a second-half substitute in both matches against the Republic of Ireland in the UEFA Euro 2012 qualifying play-offs as Estonia lost 1–5 on aggregate.

== Career statistics ==
=== Club ===
As of 10 December 2017.

Appearances and goals by club, season and competition
Club	Season	League			Cup (Note: Includes the Estonian Cup, Finnish Cup and Cypriot Cup)		League Cup		Europe		Other		Total	
Club	Season	Division	Apps	Goals	Apps	Goals	Apps	Goals	Apps	Goals	Apps	Goals	Apps	Goals
SC Real	2001	IV liiga	17	4	—		—		—		—		17	4
SC Real	2002	III liiga	17	17	—		—		—				17	17
SC Real	Total		34	21	—		—		—				34	21
Maardu	2002	Esiliiga	8	7			—		—		—		8	7
M.C. Tallinn	2003	Esiliiga	12	8	—		—		—		—		12	8
Levadia-Juunior	2003	II liiga	5	3	—		—		—		—		5	3
Levadia-Juunior	2004	II liiga	1	2	—		—		—		—		1	2
Levadia-Juunior	Total		6	5	—		—		—		—		6	5
Levadia II	2003	Meistriliiga	6	1	2	1	—		—		—		8	2
Levadia II	2004	Esiliiga	12	2	0	0	—		—		—		12	2
Levadia II	2005	Esiliiga	4	2	—		—		—		—		4	2
Levadia II	2007	Esiliiga	7	3	—		—		—		—		7	3
Levadia II	Total		29	8	2	1	—		—		—		31	9
Levadia	2003	Meistriliiga	11	4	1	0	—		1 (Note: Appearance(s) in UEFA Cup)	0	—		13	4
Levadia	2004	Meistriliiga	17	8	2	0	—		1	0	0	0	20	8
Levadia	2005	Meistriliiga	12	4	1	0	—		2 (Note: Appearances in UEFA Champions League)	0	5 (Note: One appearance in Livonia Cup, three appearances in Commonwealth Cup, one appearance in Estonian Supercup)	0	20	4
Levadia	2006	Meistriliiga	30	10	2	0	—		5	2	—		37	12
Levadia	2007	Meistriliiga	16	7	3	1	—		0	0	7 (Note: Three appearances and one goal in Commonwealth Cup, four appearances in Baltic League)	1	26	9
Levadia	Total		86	33	9	1	—		9	2	12	1	116	37
FC Inter	2008	Veikkausliiga	19	7	2	1	8	4	—		—		29	12
FC Inter	2009	Veikkausliiga	21	4	2	0	6	0	2	0	—		31	4
FC Inter	Total		40	11	4	1	14	4	2	0	—		60	16
AEP	2010–11	Cypriot First Division	26	5	3	1	—		—		—		29	6
Ethnikos Achna	2011–12	Cypriot First Division	6	1	0	0	—		—		—		6	1
PK-37	2013	Kakkonen	1	0	0	0	—		—		0	0	1	0
KuPS	2012	Veikkausliiga	27	6	4	1	0	0	5 (Note: Appearances in UEFA Europa League)	1	—		36	8
KuPS	2013	Veikkausliiga	20	4	2	0	8	4	—		—		30	8
KuPS	2014	Veikkausliiga	29	9	3	4	5	2	—		—		37	15
KuPS	2015	Veikkausliiga	0	0	0	0	2	0	—		—		2	0
KuPS	Total		76	19	9	5	15	6	5	1	—		105	31
Nõmme Kalju	2015	Meistriliiga	33	16	3	1	—		4	1	—		40	18
Nõmme Kalju	2016	Meistriliiga	28	14	1	0	—		5	0	0	0	34	14
Nõmme Kalju	Total		61	30	4	1	—		9	1	0	0	74	32
KuPS	2017	Veikkausliiga	32	8	5	2	—		—		—		37	10
Career total			417	156	36	12	29	10	25	4	12	1	519	183

=== International ===
As of 9 June 2019.

Appearances and goals by national team and year
National team	Year	Apps	Goals
Estonia
Estonia	2006	1	0
Estonia	2007	1	0
Estonia	2008	8	1
Estonia	2009	6	0
Estonia	2010	9	2
Estonia	2011	9	1
Estonia	2012	7	0
Estonia	2013	3	0
Estonia	2014	3	1
Estonia	2015	9	3
Estonia	2016	4	0
Estonia	2017	4	1
Estonia	2018	5	1
Total		69	10

=== International goals ===
As of 9 June 2018. Estonia score listed first, score column indicates score after each Purje goal.

International goals by date, venue, cap, opponent, score, result and competition
No.	Date	Venue	Cap	Opponent	Score	Result	Competition
1	20 August 2008	A. Le Coq Arena, Tallinn, Estonia	9	Malta	1–1	2–1	Friendly
2	3 March 2010	Mikheil Meskhi Stadium, Tbilisi, Georgia	17	Georgia	1–1	1–2	Friendly
3	7 September 2010	A. Le Coq Arena, Tallinn, Estonia	22	Uzbekistan	1–0	3–3	Friendly
4	2 September 2011	Stožice Stadium, Ljubljana, Slovenia	29	Slovenia	2–1	2–1	UEFA Euro 2012 qualifying
5	8 September 2014	A. Le Coq Arena, Tallinn, Estonia	46	Slovenia	1–0	1–0	UEFA Euro 2016 qualifying
6	9 June 2015	Veritas Stadion, Turku, Finland	49	Finland	1–0	2–0	Friendly
7	9 June 2015	Veritas Stadion, Turku, Finland	49	Finland	2–0	2–0	Friendly
8	11 November 2015	A. Le Coq Arena, Tallinn, Estonia	55	Georgia	1–0	3–0	Friendly
9	12 June 2017	Skonto Stadium, Riga, Latvia	61	Latvia	2–1	2–1	Friendly
10	9 June 2018	A. Le Coq Arena, Tallinn, Estonia	65	Morocco	1–3	1–3	Friendly

== Honours ==
=== Club ===
Levadia

- Meistriliiga: 2004, 2006, 2007
- Estonian Cup: 2003–04, 2004–05, 2006–07

FC Inter

- Veikkausliiga: 2008
- Finnish Cup: 2009
- Finnish League Cup: 2008

Nõmme Kalju

- Estonian Cup: 2014–15

Kuopion Palloseura

- Veikkausliiga: 2019

=== Individual ===
- Veikkausliiga Player of the Month: May 2008
- KuPS Player of the Year: 2012
