= Mika Ojala =

Finnish footballer (born 1988)

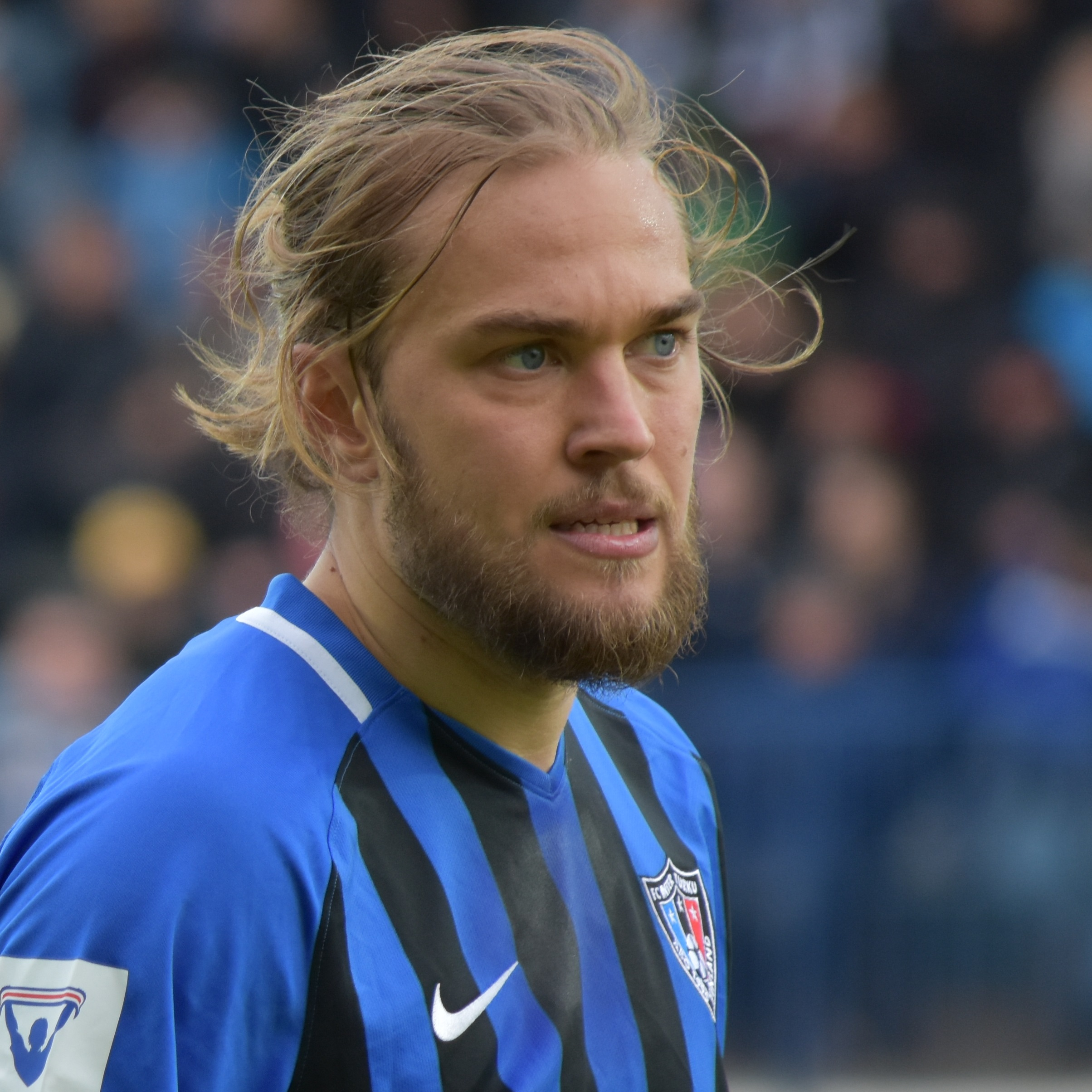
- Ojala with Inter Turku

Personal information
- Date of birth: 21 June 1988 (age 38)
- Place of birth: Paimio, Finland
- Height: 1.78 m (5 ft 10 in)
- Position: Winger

Youth career
- 1998–2000: PaiHa
- 2001–2005: Inter Turku

Senior career*
Years	Team	Apps	(Gls)
2004–2005	VG-62	39	(8)
2006–2012	Inter Turku	175	(53)
2013	BK Häcken	21	(0)
2014–2015	Inter Turku	33	(10)
2015–2017	VfR Aalen	47	(10)
2017–2019	Inter Turku	64	(10)
Total		379	(91)

International career^{‡}
2007–2010	Finland U21	17	(2)
2010–2014	Finland	9	(0)

Managerial career
- 2022–2023: SJK II (assistant)
- 2023: SJK II (interim)
- 2023: SJK II (assistant)
Medal record
Finland national football team
Second place	Baltic Cup	2012
Inter Turku
Second place	Finnish League Cup	2007
First place	Veikkausliiga	2008
First place	Finnish League Cup	2008
First place	Finnish Cup	2009
Second place	Veikkausliiga	2011
Second place	Veikkausliiga	2012
Second place	Finnish Cup	2014
- * Club domestic league appearances and goals as of 18 June 2020 ‡ National team caps and goals as of 6 December 2015

Mika Ojala (Finnish pronunciation: [ˈmikɑ ˈojɑlɑ]; born 21 June 1988) is a Finnish football coach and a former professional footballer who plays as a midfielder. He began his senior club career playing for VG-62, before signing with Inter Turku at age 18 in 2006.

Ojala made his international debut for Finland in January 2010, at the age of 21.

== Club career ==
=== VG-62 ===
Ojala started his football career in Paimion Haka and later moved to Inter Turku's junior system. He made his debut on senior level at the age of 16 in Inter Turku's reserve team VG-62.

=== Inter Turku ===
Ojala gained his first appearance in Veikkausliiga during season 2006.

On 17 November 2008, he joined the Dutch club Heerenveen for a one-week-trial together with Wilhelm Ingves from IFK Mariehamn. He visited FC Zürich in 2006.

=== Häcken ===
On 9 November 2012, after his contract with Inter had expired, it was announced that Ojala had signed a three-year contract with Swedish topflight club BK Häcken, joining with compatriot Kari Arkivuo.

=== Return to Inter Turku ===
He returned to Inter Turku in February 2014 when he signed a contract for season 2014.

=== VfR Aalen ===
In the beginning of July 2015 Ojala transferred to German 3. Liga side VfR Aalen.

== International career ==
Ojala was selected in the Finland national squad by Stuart Baxter in August 2008. He was also called up in the U21 squad that reached the 2009 UEFA European Under-21 Football Championship. Ojala made his national team debut on 18 January 2010 as he came from the bench to replace Roni Porokara in friendly match against South Korea at Málaga, Spain where Finland had winter training camp. Ojala gained his second appearance for the national team on 10 August 2011 at Skonto Stadium in a friendly match against Latvia when he and Timo Furuholm replaced Teemu Pukki and Mika Ääritalo as forwards.

== Career statistics ==
=== Club ===
As of 28 January 2017

Appearances and goals by club, season and competition
Club	Season	League			National cups		Europe		Total	
Club	Season	Division	Apps	Goals	Apps	Goals	Apps	Goals	Apps	Goals
Inter Turku	2006	Veikkausliiga	20	0	0	0	–		20	0
Inter Turku	2007	Veikkausliiga	24	4	0	0	–		24	4
Inter Turku	2008	Veikkausliiga	26	8	0	0	–		26	8
Inter Turku	2009	Veikkausliiga	22	7	0	0	2	0	24	7
Inter Turku	2010	Veikkausliiga	23	6	9	1	1	0	33	7
Inter Turku	2011	Veikkausliiga	32	16	7	5	–		39	21
Inter Turku	2012	Veikkausliiga	28	12	9	3	2	0	39	15
Inter Turku	Total		175	53	25	9	5	0	205	62
Häcken	2013	Allsvenskan	21	0	2	0	2	0	25	0
Inter Turku	2014	Veikkausliiga	16	6	6	0	–		22	6
Inter Turku	2015	Veikkausliiga	14	4	7	3	–		21	7
Inter Turku	Total		30	10	13	3	0	0	43	13
VfR Aalen	2015–16	3. Liga	21	5	1	0	–		22	5
VfR Aalen	2016–17	3. Liga	26	5	2	0	–		28	5
VfR Aalen	Total		47	10	3	0	0	0	50	10
Inter Turku	2017	Veikkausliiga	13	1	–		–		13	1
Inter Turku	2018	Veikkausliiga	27	3	6	0	–		33	3
Inter Turku	2019	Veikkausliiga	24	6	2	0	1	0	27	6
Inter Turku	Total		64	10	8	0	1	0	73	10
Career total			337	85	49	9	8	0	396	92

=== International ===
As of matches played on 24 January 2014

Appearances and goals by national team and year
National team	Year	Apps	Goals
Finland	2010	1	0
Finland	2011	1	0
Finland	2012	4	0
Finland	2013	2	0
Finland	2014	1	0
Total		9	0

== Honours ==
Inter Turku

- Veikkausliiga: 2008
- Finnish League Cup: 2008
- Finnish Cup: 2009

Individual

- Veikkausliiga Player of the Month: August 2008, June 2011, July 2011,
- Veikkausliiga Midfielder of the Year: 2008, 2011, 2012
- Veikkausliiga Top assist provider: 2011
