= 2009 Finnish Cup =

2009 Suomen Cupen
Tournament details
- Country: Finland
- Teams: 356

Final positions
- Champions: Inter Turku
- Runners-up: Tampere United
- UEFA Europa League: Inter Turku

Finnish Cup 2009 (Finnish: Suomen Cup) was the 55th season of the main annual football (soccer) cup competition in Finland. It is organized as a single-elimination knock–out tournament.

Participation in the competition is voluntary. Veikkausliiga side IFK Mariehamn, for example, decided not to register for the tournament, as well as some Ykkönen teams.

A total of 356 teams registered for the competition. They entered in different rounds, depending on their position within the league system. Clubs with teams in Kolmonen (level IV) or an inferior league, as well as Veterans and Junior teams, started the competition in Round 1. Teams from Ykkönen (level II) and Kakkonen (level III) entered in Round 4. Veikkausliiga clubs started in Round 5 with the exception of Inter Turku, FC Honka, FC Lahti and HJK Helsinki. These four teams entered in Round 6 because they qualified for European competitions after the 2008 season.

The tournament started on 28 March 2009 with the First Round and concluded with the Final on 31 October 2009 at Finnair Stadium, Helsinki. Inter Turku defeated Tampere United 2–1, giving them a place in the second qualifying round of the 2010–11 UEFA Europa League. They have since been promoted to the third qualifying round because Atlético Madrid, winners of the 2009–10 UEFA Europa League, are now assured of qualifying domestically for the 2010–11 Europa League, either as winners of the 2009–10 Copa del Rey or losing finalists to a Champions League-qualified Sevilla.

== Round 1 ==
The draw for this round was conducted on 12 March 2008. 102 teams were drawn into 51 matches for this round. 213 teams received a bye into the next round. The matches were played between 28 March and 14 April 2009.

Tie no	Home team	Score	Away team
1	Töölön Taisto	2–5	FC Viikingit Reserves
2	MPS 4	1–2	FC Degis
3	FC POHU Reserves	1–1 (a.e.t.)	Kurvin Vauhti
POHU Reserves advance 4–1 on penalties
4	FC HeIF	2–4	Colo Colo
5	FC POHU 3	4–2	PH-99
6	FFR	0–7	MPS
7	Kiffen Veterans	3–1	AFC EMU
8	KPR	1–6	Zenith
9	Gnistan Juniors	0–4	HJK-Liiga Juniors
10	HerTo	1–2	PuiU
11	FC Brunnsparkens	5–0	HJK-j Juniors
12	PPV Reserves	0–1	HJK-j Reserves
13	Gnistan Reserves	3–4 (a.e.t.)	PPV
14	RiRa Reserves	0–6	Pathoven
15	HooGee Reserves	3–1	Pelikaanit
16	Naseva	3–1	KoiPS Juniors
17	KP-75	0–9	City Stars
18	FC Kasiysi Reserves	0–5	TuPS
19	KyIF FCK	0–6	AC Vantaa
20	F.C.B.	0–3	FC Honka Juniors Reserves
21	Lahen Pojat	3–0	FC Tuusula
22	PoPo	2–1 (a.e.t.)	LauTP
23	FC Repaleet Veterans	1–3 (a.e.t.)	KTP Veterans
24	PEPO	1–2	Sudet
25	AFC Keltik	1–2	S.C. Zulimanit
26	Riverball Veterans	0–1	SC KuFu-98

Tie no	Home team	Score	Away team
27	JuPS	0–2	SiPS
28	TuP-V	0–3	TPK Juniors
29	VG-62	1–2	JyTy
30	Nagu IF	1–1 (a.e.t.)	PIF
PIF advance 5–4 on penalties
31	Ponteva	3–1	RaiTeePee
32	FC KyPS	2–8	ÅIFK Juniors
33	PiPS	2–3	KaaPS
34	KaaRe	0–3	FC RP
35	Paimion Haka	0–6	MaPS
36	ToVe	3–0	PiTU
37	PiPo-79	0–6	PATO
38	ViiPV	2–3 (a.e.t.)	KaVo
39	Kristallpalatsi	1–1 (a.e.t.)	LaVe
LaVe advance 3–2 on penalties
40	UrPS	1–2 (a.e.t.)	NePa
41	VIlves	0–10	VaKP
42	TP-Seinäjoki	2–1	IK
43	NuPa	4–1	TeTe
44	Luja	–	VPS-j
45	Kungliga Wasa	1–2	FC Kuffen
46	KuRy	2–1	Virkiä Reserves
47	FC Korsholm Reserves	0–2	SIK
48	KaIK/TePa	3–1	Jurva-70
49	Ura	7–2	MunU
50	Esse IK	0–6	IFK Jakobstad
51	FC Kurenpojat	1–2	OuRe

== Round 2 ==
The draw for this round was conducted on 12 March 2009. The 51 winners of the First Round, along with 213 teams who received a bye, were drawn into 132 matches for this round. The matches were played between 2–24 April 2009.

Tie no	Home team	Score	Away team
52	PPJ Reserves	1–6	KäPa Juniors
53	Lauttapallo	0–5	PPV
54	Kiffen Veterans	4–1	HPS Juniors
55	Cosmos AP	0–6	HPS
56	PK-35 Reserves	2–1	PuiU
57	FC POHU 3	1–0	Töölön Vesa Reserves
58	MPS Veterans	8–0	FC Pakila
59	MPS Reserves	4–1	Colo Colo
60	FC Kontu Reserves	1–3	FC Viikingit Reserves
61	Gnistan 4	1–4	Gnistan Ogeli 3
62	SAPA Reserves	0–6	MaKu
63	Arsenal	2–5	FC Degis
64	HJK-j Reserves	0–10	HJK-Liiga Juniors
65	FC East	3–2	AC StaSi Reserves
66	FC Brunnsparkens	2–0	HIFK Reserves
67	Zenith	1–2	LPS Reserves
68	FC Puotila	2–1 (a.e.t.)	FC HePu
69	POHU Reserves	2–3	SAPA
70	AC StaSi	3–2	HeKuLa
71	HJK-j	0–6	MPS
72	FC ALPC	1–3	Saykus
73	HDS	2–1	SUMU
74	FC POHU	0–4	FC Kontu
75	Töölön Vesa	3–1 (a.e.t.)	PPJ
76	FC POHU 4	0–8	Ponnistus
77	HooGee	1–3	Naseva
78	JoKi	0–6	EsPa
79	KoiPS	2–10	TuPS
80	MyMy	0–12	City Stars
81	SibboV Reserves	0–10	JäPS
82	FC Lohja	1–1 (a.e.t.)	Lahen Pojat
Lahen Pojat advance 3–2 on penalties
83	JäPS Reserves	1–13	SalReipas
84	NouLa	0–1	NJS Reserves
85	VJS Juniors	3–2	FC Honka Juniors Reserves
86	HooGee Reserves	8–0	KarLU Reserves
87	RIlves	2–4	AC Vantaa
88	FCD	0–1	FC Reipas Juniors
89	IVU	1–3	MasKi
90	NuPS Reserves	0–1	VJS
91	Pathoven	1–3	BK-46
92	EIF Reserves	0–4	KOPSE
93	FC Honka Juniors	5–1	EBK
94	OPedot	2–1 (a.e.t.)	NJS
95	Nopsa	2–5	FC Västnyland
96	GrIFK Reserves	1–3	FC Kasiysi
97	RiRa	0–2	Pöxyt
98	SibboV	4–1	KarLU
99	I-HK	6–2	FC Kasiysi Juniors
100	RT-88	0–7	Stars
101	TiPS	1–3	NuPS
102	FC PASA	3–2	STPS
103	WIFK Veterans	0–4	Sudet
104	KoPa	0–6	PoPo
105	PoPo Reserves	1–9	RiPa
106	STPS Reserves	1–2	HaPK
107	FC Villisiat	4–2	IPS
108	FC Loviisa	3–0	VKajo
109	OViesti	0–5	KTP Reserves
110	FC Kausala	1–2	Purha
111	Peltirumpu	4–1	Jäntevä
112	KTP Veterans	4–3	Lappee JK
113	HaTP	0–5	PaPe
114	SC Riverball	3–0	S.C. Zulimanit
115	SuPa	0–4	SaPa
116	JoPS Reserves	0–4	SC KuFu-98
117	Hurtat	2–3	KuKi
118	Yllätys	3–1	KJK

Tie no	Home team	Score	Away team
119	MPR	6–1	La-Pa-95
120	HarTe	0–2	JoPS
121	SiPS	3–0	ToU
122	BET Reserves	0–7	K-Jazz
123	MuurY	2–3	BET
124	FC KaDy	11–0	Multiants
125	FC K-Jazz Reserves	1–6	KeuPa
126	PaRi	0–2	JPS
127	FCV Reserves	1–0	JIlves
128	Lieto Reserves	1–8	SoVo
129	KaaPS	0–7	MaPS
130	Ryhti	1–4	TuWe
131	FC RP	0–3	G.P.R. FC
132	AC Sauvo	1–3	JyTy
133	KaaPo Reserves	0–2	TPK Juniors
134	TPK 3	0–6	Vilpas
135	Ponteva	0–6	TPK
136	TC	0–6	ÅIFK Juniors
137	PIF	0–4	Lieto
138	SaTo	1–4	FC Boda
139	FC Rauma	7–0	Nasta
140	HNS	1–3	ToVe
141	PoSa	0–6	EuPa
142	ReKu	1–4	P-Iirot Reserves
143	LuVe	2–9	MuSa
144	VaKP Reserves	0–8	PATO
145	NoPS	4–3	ToiP-49
146	FC TaFu	0–9	VaKP
147	Pallopäät	6–0	TahVe
148	NePa	9–0	Loiske
149	ViiPV Reserves	0–1	LeTo
150	IKU	0–10	FC Tampere
151	ParVi	3–1 (a.e.t.)	TKT Juniors
152	YPallo	3–1	FC Trompi
153	TPV Reserves	2–4	Oldschool
154	FJK Reserves	3–4 (a.e.t.)	KaVo
155	PJK Reserves	2–0	I-Kissat
156	NoPy	0–1	FC Vapsi Juniors
157	FC Vapsi	3–2	AC Darra
158	FC Tribe	3–1	LaVe
159	FC Vapsi Veterans	0–4	TKT
160	TP-Seinäjoki	12–2	APV
161	KJV	0–12	VPS-j
162	FC Kuffen	0–1	VäVi
163	MIF	1–1 (a.e.t.)	SIK
SIK advance 4–2 on penalties
164	NuPa	2–4	KaIK/TePa
165	Sisu	2–6	FC Korsholm
166	Black Islanders	0–4	LaPo-90
167	KuRy	0–7	Karhu
168	FC Sääripotku	1–5	KPS Juniors
169	Real Kokkola Veterans	10–0	LoVe
170	OuHu	1–6	IFK Jakobstad
171	Reima	1–6	Öja
172	Ura	0–12	KP-V
173	IK Myran	1–4	NIK
174	Pedersöre FF	5–0	FC Folk
175	FC Rai	6–2	OLS Juniors Reserves
176	OuRe	2–0	JS Hercules
177	OLS Juniors	1–4	Tervarit
178	RoPS Juniors	2–1	OuTa
179	FC Tarmo	0–3	Spartak
180	FC Rio Grande	1–4	AC Kajaani
181	FC Rai Reserves	1–4	Ajax
182	FC Lepakot	1–1 (a.e.t.)	OuJK
OuJK advance 9–8 on penalties
183	FC Nets	2–5	PaTe

== Round 3 ==
The draw for this round was conducted on 16 April 2009. The 132 winners of the Second Round were drawn into 66 matches for this round. The matches were played between 25 April–3 May 2009.

Tie no	Home team	Score	Away team
184	RiPa	1–1 (a.e.t.)	SalReipas
RiPa advance 5–4 on penalties
185	AC StaSi	0–4	MPS
186	FC Villisiat	1–3	FC Viikingit Reserves
187	HDS	5–0	PaPe
188	FC POHU 3	5–1	KTP Reserves
189	LPS Reserves	4–1	FC Kontu
190	FC Brunnsparkens	0–4	EsPa
191	KOPSE	1–3	VJS
192	Gnistan Ogeli 3	2–4	FC PASA
193	Stars	0–3	OPedot
194	PK-35 Reserves	4–0	MaKu
195	Naseva	2–2 (a.e.t.)	Sudet
Naseva advance 5–4 on penalties
196	MPS Reserves	1–4 (a.e.t.)	BK-46
197	NuPS	5–0	VJS Juniors
198	KTP Veterans	4–3	KäPa Juniors
199	Purha	3–2	FC Kasiysi
200	HJK-Liiga Juniors	4–0	Ponnistus
201	SAPA	0–1	JäPS
202	MPS Veterans	1–0	Töölön Vesa
203	Saykus	1–1 (a.e.t.)	NJS Reserves
Saykus advance 4–1 on penalties
204	FC East	0–10	City Stars
205	FC Västnyland	7–1	I-HK
206	Kiffen Veterans	0–5	Pöxyt
207	FC Puotila	1–3	MasKi
208	FC Degis	4–2	TuPS
209	PoPo	1–6	AC Vantaa
210	FC Reipas Juniors	0–1	PPV
211	Lahen Pojat	0–2	HPS
212	FC Loviisa	1–6	FC Honka Juniors
213	HooGee Reserves	2–2 (a.e.t.)	HaPK
HooGee Reserves advance 8–7 on penalties
214	SibboV	7–0	Peltirumpu
215	KuKi	3–4	JoPS

Tie no	Home team	Score	Away team
216	Yllätys	4–5	BET
217	KeuPa	2–1	SiPS
218	FCV Reserves	0–4	JPS
219	FC KaDy	0–7	K-Jazz
220	MPR	2–3	SC KuFu-98
221	SaPa	0–4	FC Riverball
222	TuWe	1–2	TPK Juniors
223	EuPa	1–2	ToVe
224	TPK	3–1	AIFK Juniors
225	G.P.R. FC	2–1	Vilpas
226	MuSa	1–2	FC Boda
227	SoVo	4–3 (a.e.t.)	P-Iirot Reserves
228	MaPS	6–2	Lieto
229	JyTy	1–0	FC Rauma
230	Oldschool	0–4	VaKP
231	YPallo	4–3	FC Vapsi Juniors
232	FC Vapsi	0–3	NoPS
233	FC Tampere	3–0	Pallopäät
234	LeTo	1–3	NePa
235	PJK Reserves	6–1	FC Tribe
236	ParVi	0–2	KaVo
237	PATO	2–2 (a.e.t.)	TKT
PATO advance 5–3 on penalties
238	VäVi	2–3	FC Korsholm
239	SIK	0–4	Karhu
240	LaPo-90	1–2 (a.e.t.)	VPS-j
241	KaIK/TePa	2–0	TP-Seinäjoki
242	IFK Jakobstad	4–1	OuJK
243	RoPS Juniors	1–2	KP-V
244	Pedersöre FF	7–1	FC Rai
245	OuRe	1–2 (a.e.t.)	PaTe
246	AC Kajaani	4–0	Öja
247	Ajax	0–3	Tervarit
248	Spartak	2–1	NIK
249	Real Kokkola Veterans	2–1	KPS Juniors

== Round 4 ==
This round included the 66 winners from the previous round and the 28 clubs from the Ykkönen 2009 and Kakkonen 2009 seasons that entered into the competition. These clubs were drawn into 47 matches that took place between 5 and 26 May 2009.

Tie no	Home team	Score	Away team
250	Naseva	3–0	HooGee Reserves
251	FC Degis	2–3	GrIFK
252	FC Viikingit Reserves	4–3	NuPS
253	MPS Veterans	0–5	Pöxyt
254	PK-35 Reserves	2–3	LoPa
255	KTP Veterans	3–3	Purha
KTP Veterans advance 6–5 on penalties
256	FC POHU 3	1–3	AC Vantaa
257	HJK-Liiga Juniors	1–4	PK-35 Vantaa
258	PPV	0–3	KooTeePee
259	RiPa	0–3	FC Futura
260	SibboV	1–2 (a.e.t.)	Pallohonka
261	EsPa	0–1	Gnistan
262	JäPS	0–2	FC Espoo
263	FC Västnyland	2–3	FC Honka Juniors
264	BK-46	5–3	HIFK
265	VJS	1–3	KTP
266	MasKi	4–3 (a.e.t.)	FC PASA
267	Saykus	1–3	City Stars
268	HDS	3–2 (a.e.t.)	HPS
269	MPS	3–2	K-Jazz
270	OPedot	0–4	FC Viikingit
271	LPS Reserves	1–2	EIF
272	SC KuFu-98	0–3	FC Riverball
273	KeuPa	1–7	JIPPO
274	JoPS	1–2	BET

Tie no	Home team	Score	Away team
275	JPS	0–2	PK-37
276	YPallo	0–9	TPV
277	MaPS	3–0	NoPS
278	FC Boda	1–2	Pirkkala JK
279	FC Tampere	4–1	TPK
280	SoVo	0–1 (a.e.t.)	FC Jazz-j
281	PATO	2–5 (a.e.t.)	FC PoPa
282	PJK Reserves	0–4	TPK Juniors
283	NePa	2–4	PP-70
284	KaVo	2–2 (a.e.t.)	JyTy
KaVo advance 4–2 on penalties
285	VaKP	1–2	Ilves
286	G.P.R. FC	2–2 (a.e.t.)	ToVe
ToVe advance 6–3 on penalties
287	AC Kajaani	0–2	FC YPA
288	KP-V	2–7	FC Santa Claus
289	Real Kokkola Veterans	3–2	Norrvalla FF
290	VPS-j	2–1	FC Korsholm
291	PaTe	2–4	Tervarit
292	Pedersöre FF	1–3	GBK
293	IFK Jakobstad	2–3	JBK
294	Spartak	3–3 (a.e.t.)	Lapuan Virkiä
Spartak advance 6–5 on penalties
295	KaIK/TePa	1–1 (a.e.t.)	PS Kemi
KaIK/TePa advance 4–3 on penalties
296	Karhu	2–1	FC OuPa

== Round 5 ==
This round included the 47 winners of the previous round and the 9 Veikkausliiga 2009 clubs that entered this competition who were not involved in European competitions for the 2009-10 cycle. This included all the clubs in the league competition except for Inter Turku, FC Honka, FC Lahti and HJK Helsinki, who entered the competition in the round following this one, and IFK Mariehamn who decided not to participate in this competition. These 28 matches were played between 1 and 12 June 2009.

Tie no	Home team	Score	Away team
297	FC Honka Juniors	2–3	KuPS
298	Naseva	0–9	MyPa
299	KTP Veterans	0–8	JJK Jyväskylä
300	BK-46	0–2	FC Viikingit
301	FC Riverball	1–3	PK-35 Vantaa
302	BET	0–7	Gnistan
303	MPS	1–3 (a.e.t.)	JIPPO
304	HDS	0–4	KooTeePee
305	FC Viikingit Reserves	1–2	FC Espoo
306	MasKi	0–5	Pallohonka
307	AC Vantaa	2–2 (a.e.t.)	EIF
AC Vantaa advance 4–3 on penalties
308	Pöxyt	4–0	GrIFK
309	City Stars	2–0	KTP
310	FC Futura	2–0	LoPa

Tie no	Home team	Score	Away team
311	MaPS	1–6	TPS
312	TPK Juniors	1–10	Tampere United
313	FC Tampere	0–7	FC Haka
314	ToVe	0–6	Pirkkala JK
315	KaVo	1–4	FC PoPa
316	Ilves	1–5	TPV
317	PP-70	3–3 (a.e.t.)	FC Jazz-j
FC Jazz-j advance 6–3 on penalties
318	KaIK/TePa	0–5	VPS
319	VPS-j	0–4	RoPS
320	Tervarit	0–5	FF Jaro
321	Karhu	0–8	JBK
322	Spartak	2–1 (a.e.t.)	FC YPA
323	Real Kokkola Veterans	2–1	FC Santa Claus
324	PK-37	0–4	GBK

== Round 6 ==
This round included the 28 winners from the previous round and the 4 Veikkausliiga 2009 clubs involved in European competition in the 2009-10 cycle: Inter Turku, FC Honka, FC Lahti and HJK Helsinki. These matches were played on 8 and 9 July 2009 except for the match between FC Viikingit and FC Lahti, which took place on August 12 due to Lahti's involvement in the Europa League.

Tie no	Home team	Score	Away team
325	FC Espoo	0-1	HJK Helsinki
326	Inter Turku	2–0	RoPS
327	Real Kokkola Veterans	2–6	Pallohonka
328	TPV	3–1	JIPPO
329	FC Futura	1–4	VPS
330	MyPa	1–3	KuPS
331	Gnistan	5–0	JBK
332	FC PoPa	3–1	PK-35 Vantaa

Tie no	Home team	Score	Away team
333	Tampere United	2–0	FF Jaro
334	City Stars	3–1	Pirkkala JK
335	AC Vantaa	2–3	JJK Jyväskylä
336	Spartak	0–5	FC Haka
337	GBK	0–1	FC Jazz-j
338	Pöxyt	0–2	TPS
339	KooTeePee	0–2	FC Honka
340	FC Viikingit	1–2 (a.e.t.)	FC Lahti

== Round 7 ==
This round included the 16 winners of the previous round. These matches were played on 29 and 30 August 2009.

Tie no	Home team	Score	Away team
341	FC Haka	2-1	JJK Jyväskylä
342	TPS	2–6 (aet)	FC Honka
343	TPV	2–3 (aet)	Tampere United
344	Inter Turku	1–0	FC PoPa

Tie no	Home team	Score	Away team
345	KuPS	1–0	HJK Helsinki
346	VPS	0-2	FC Jazz-j
347	Gnistan	1–2	FC Lahti
348	City Stars	2–0	Pallohonka

== Quarter-finals ==
This round included the eight winners from the previous round.

30 September 2009
18:30 EEST

City Stars	0 - 3	FC Honka
		J. Puustinen 68', 89', 90'

Lahden Stadion, Lahti

1 October 2009
18:30 EEST

KuPS	0 - 2	Inter Turku
		J. Kauko 3'; K. Nwanganga 23'

Magnum Areena, Kuopio

1 October 2009
18:30 EEST

FC Lahti	4 - 0	FC Jazz-j
D. Shala 13'; K. Hietanen 67'; Rafael 78'; K. Rantanen 86'

Lahden Stadion, Lahti

1 October 2009
18:30 EEST

FC Haka	1 - 3	Tampere United
V. Minkenen 81'		J. Hjelm 26'; Rafinha 34', 37'

Tehtaan kenttä, Valkeakoski

== Semi-finals ==
This round included the four quarter-final winners.

25 October 2009
17:00 EEST

Tampere United	1 - 1 (aet)	FC Honka
J. Niemi 94' (pen.)		J. Puustinen 119'
Penalties
	4 – 3

Tammela Stadion, Tampere

25 October 2009
18:30 EEST

FC Lahti	3 - 4	Inter Turku
Rafael 11', 55'; J. Kemppinen 67'		M. Ojala 15' (pen.), 53', 86'; Kennedy 45'

Lahden Stadion, Lahti

== Final ==
The two semi-final winners participated in this match.

31 October 2009
15.30 EEST

Tampere United	1 - 2	Inter Turku
J. Hjelm 11'		K. Nwanganga 45', T. Furuholm 77'

Finnair Stadium, Helsinki
