= Valtter Laaksonen =

Finnish footballer (born 1984)

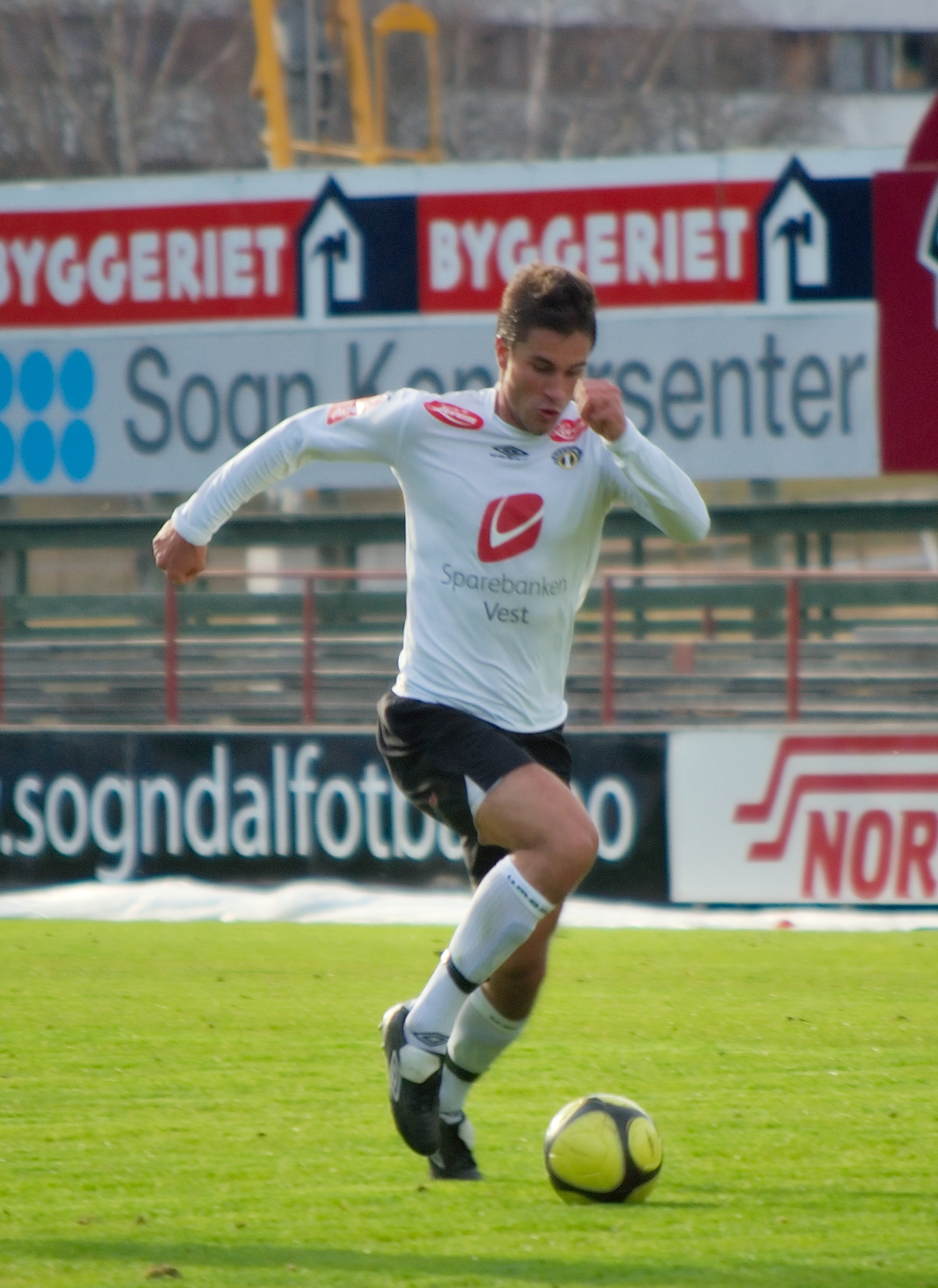
- Laaksonen in 2009

Personal information
- Full name: Valtteri Viljami Laaksonen
- Date of birth: 3 May 1984 (age 42)
- Place of birth: Turku, Finland
- Height: 1.85 m (6 ft 1 in)
- Position: Forward

Senior career*
Years	Team	Apps	(Gls)
2001–2007	Inter Turku	75	(18)
2008–2009	Sogndal	28	(4)
2009	→ Stavanger (loan)	12	(4)
2010–2012	VPS	42	(6)
- * Club domestic league appearances and goals

Valtter Viljami Laaksonen (born 3 May 1984) is a Finnish former footballer who last played for Finnish Veikkausliiga club VPS.

== Career statistics ==
As of 1 September 2024.

Appearances and goals by club, season and competition
Club	Season	League			Cup (Note: Includes Suomen Cup)		League cup		Europe		Total	
Club	Season	Division	Apps	Goals	Apps	Goals	Apps	Goals	Apps	Goals	Apps	Goals
Inter Turku	2001	Veikkausliiga	6	0	–		–		–		6	0
Inter Turku	2002	Veikkausliiga	1	0	–		–		–		1	0
Inter Turku	2003	Veikkausliiga	6	0	–		–		–		6	0
Inter Turku	2004	Veikkausliiga	3	1	–		–		–		3	1
Inter Turku	2005	Veikkausliiga	14	2	–		–		1 (Note: Appearance(s) in UEFA Intertoto Cup)	0	15	2
Inter Turku	2006	Veikkausliiga	24	10	–		–		–		24	10
Inter Turku	2007	Veikkausliiga	20	5	–		–		–		20	5
Inter Turku	Total		74	18	0	0	0	0	1	0	75	18
Sogndal	2008	1. divisjon	19	2	0	0	–		–		19	2
Sogndal	2009	1. divisjon	9	2	0	0	–		–		9	2
Sogndal	Total		28	4	0	0	–		–		28	4
Sogndal 2	2008	3. divisjon	2	0	–		–		–		2	0
Stavanger (loan)	2009	1. divisjon	12	4	–		–		–		12	4
VPS	2010	Veikkausliiga	13	3	2	0	–		–		15	3
VPS	2011	Veikkausliiga	25	2	0	0	2	1	–		27	3
VPS	Total		38	5	2	0	2	1	0	0	42	6
Career total			154	31	2	0	2	1	1	0	159	32
