= Aleksandr Kokko =

Russian-born Finnish footballer (born 1987)

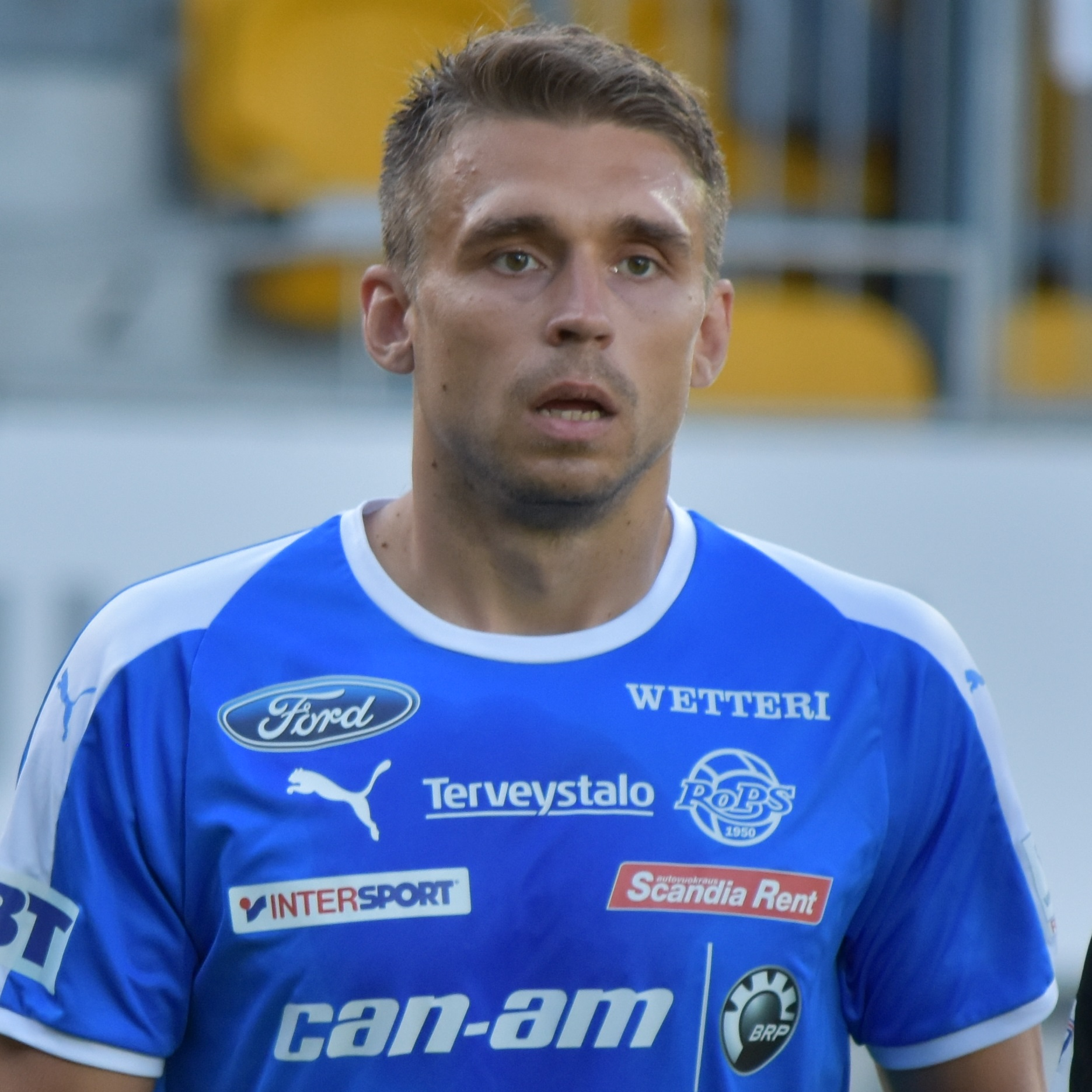
- Kokko with RoPS in 2018

Personal information
- Date of birth: 4 June 1987 (age 39)
- Place of birth: Leningrad, Soviet Union
- Height: 1.89 m (6 ft 2 1/2 in)
- Position: Striker

Youth career
- 1997–2004: Jazz

Senior career*
Years	Team	Apps	(Gls)
2004	Jazz	1	(0)
2004–2006	PoPa	13	(5)
2006	Hämeenlinna	15	(12)
2007–2010	Honka	58	(32)
2010	→ PoPa (loan)	7	(5)
2011	VPS	18	(3)
2012–2016	RoPS	104	(56)
2016–2017	Newcastle Jets	13	(1)
2017–2018	Eastern	6	(3)
2018–2020	RoPS	26	(3)
Total		261	(120)

International career^{‡}
2008–2009	Finland U21	5	(3)
2016	Finland	1	(0)
- * Club domestic league appearances and goals as of 26 November 2021 ‡ National team caps and goals as of 28 February 2017

Aleksandr Kokko (born 4 June 1987) is a Russian-born Finnish former footballer who plays as a striker.

== Early life ==
Kokko was born in Leningrad, Soviet Union. He is of Ingrian Finnish descent and emigrated with his family to Pori, Finland at the age of ten.

== Club career ==
Kokko started playing football in FC Jazz youth sector.

In 2004, he made his first appearance in the Finnish top flight Veikkausliiga at the age of 17 with Jazz first team. He joined fellow Veikkausliiga club FC Honka before the 2007 season and made six appearances for the club during his first season. On 5 May 2008, he scored a hat-trick when FC Honka beat FC Haka in a league match by the scoreline of 7–0. Those were his first goals in the Finnish Premier Division. Kokko was the top goalscorer in the 2008 season of Veikkausliiga with 13 goals. In August 2010, Kokko was loaned to FC PoPa. He joined VPS for the 2011 season, before joining RoPS in 2012.

On 6 August 2016, Kokko signed a two-year deal with Australian A-League club Newcastle Jets

On 10 July 2017, he decided to join Hong Kong Premier League club Eastern.

On 21 June 2018, Kokko returned to RoPS, signing until the end of the 2019 season.

Kokko announcement his retirement from playing career after the 2020 season.

== International career ==
Kokko made his debut for the Finland U21 on 20 August 2008 in a match against Sweden. In February 2016 he debuted for the Finland national team against Sweden.

== Career statistics ==
As of 31 December 2020

Appearances and goals by club, season and competition
Club	Season	League			National cup (Note: Includes Suomen Cup)		Other		Continental		Total	
Club	Season	Division	Apps	Goals	Apps	Goals	Apps	Goals	Apps	Goals	Apps	Goals
Jazz	2004	Veikkausliiga	1	0	0	0	—		—		1	0
PoPa	2004	Kolmonen					—		—			
PoPa	2005	Kakkonen					—		—			
PoPa	2006	Kakkonen					—		—			
PoPa	Total		13	5			—		—		13	5
Hämeenlinna	2006	Ykkönen	15	12	0	0	—		—		15	12
Honka	2007	Veikkausliiga	3	0	0	0	0	0	2 (Note: Includes UEFA Intertoto Cup)	0	5	0
Honka	2008	Veikkausliiga	26	13	0	0	0	0	6 (Note: Includes UEFA Cup)	0	32	13
Honka	2009	Veikkausliiga	18	2	0	0	6 (Note: Includes Finnish League Cup)	6	2 (Note: Includes UEFA Europa League)	0	28	8
Honka	2010	Veikkausliiga	8	2	1	0	1	0	0	0	10	2
Honka	Total		55	17	1	0	7	6	10	0	73	23
PoPa (loan)	2010	Ykkönen	7	5	0	0	—		—		7	5
VPS	2011	Veikkausliiga	18	3	0	0	0	0	—		18	3
RoPS	2012	Ykkönen	22	15	0	0	—		—		22	15
RoPS	2013	Veikkausliiga	18	6	5	4	5	1	—		28	11
RoPS	2014	Veikkausliiga	19	9	2	1	2	0	2	0	25	10
RoPS	2015	Veikkausliiga	30	17	1	2	2	0	—		33	19
RoPS	2016	Veikkausliiga	15	9	2	4	2	0	4	0	23	13
RoPS	Total		104	56	10	11	11	1	6	0	131	68
Newcastle Jets	2016–17	A-League	13	1	0	0	—		—		13	1
Eastern	2017–18	Hong Kong Premier League	6	3	0	0	4 (Note: Includes three appearances in Hong Kong Sapling Cup and one appearance and one goal in Hong Kong Senior Challenge Shield)	1	—		10	4
RoPS	2018	Veikkausliiga	8	1	—		—		—		8	1
RoPS	2019	Veikkausliiga	11	1	1	0	—		2	0	14	1
RoPS	2020	Veikkausliiga	7	1	3	0	—		—		10	1
RoPS	Total		26	3	4	0	0	0	2	0	32	3
Career total			258	105	15	11	22	8	18	0	313	124

== Honours ==
=== Club ===
FC Honka

- Veikkausliiga
  - Runners-up: 2009, 2018

VPS

- Veikkausliiga
  - Runners-up: 2015

RoPS

- Veikkausliiga
  - Runners-up: 2018

=== Individual ===
- Veikkausliiga Young Player of the Year: 2008
- Veikkausliiga Player of the Month: June 2015, October 2015
- Veikkausliiga Forward of the Year: May 2008, 2015
- Veikkausliiga Player of the Year: 2015
- Veikkausliiga Top goalscorer: 2008, 2015
- Ykkönen Top goalscorer: 2012
