= 2009 Veikkausliiga =

Veikkausliiga
- Season: 2009
- Champions: HJK; 22nd league title
- Relegated: RoPS
- Champions League: HJK
- Europa League: Honka; TPS; Inter Turku (via dom. cup)
- Matches: 182
- Goals: 498 (2.74 per match)
- Top goalscorer: Hermanni Vuorinen (16)
- Biggest home win: Honka 9-0 RoPS
- Biggest away win: RoPS 1-5 TamU; KuPS 0-4 Honka; RoPS 0-4 TPS
- Highest scoring: Honka 9-0 RoPS

The 2009 Veikkausliiga was the 79th season of top-tier football in Finland. It began on 18 April 2009 and ended on 17 October 2009. Inter Turku were the defending champions.

The championship was won by HJK Helsinki, who came out on top of a three-team race which also involved Honka Espoo and TPS Turku. On the bottom end of the table, RoPS were relegated to the Ykkönen while JJK will have to compete in a two-legged relegation play-off.

== Promotion and relegation ==
KooTeePee finished at the bottom of the 2008 season and were relegated to Ykkönen. Their place was taken by Ykkönen champions JJK. 13th placed Veikkausliiga team KuPS and Ykkönen runners-up competed in a two-legged relegation play-offs for one spot in 2009 Veikkausliiga. KuPS won 2–1 on aggregate and thereby retained their league position.

== Overview ==
Location of teams in Veikkausliiga 2009

Club	Location	Stadium	Capacity	Manager
FC Haka	Valkeakoski	Tehtaan kenttä	3,516	(Finland) Olli Huttunen
HJK	Helsinki	Finnair Stadium	10,770	(Finland) Antti Muurinen
FC Honka	Espoo	Tapiolan Urheilupuisto	6,000	(Finland) Mika Lehkosuo
FC Inter	Turku	Veritas Stadion	9,372	(Netherlands) Job Dragtsma
FF Jaro	Jakobstad	Jakobstads Centralplan	5,000	(Finland) Mika Laurikainen
JJK	Jyväskylä	Harjun stadion	3,000	(Finland) Ville Priha
KuPS	Kuopio	Magnum Areena	3,500	(Finland) Kai Nyyssönen
FC Lahti	Lahti	Lahden Stadion	14,465	(Finland) Ilkka Mäkelä
IFK Mariehamn	Mariehamn	Wiklöf Holding Arena	1,600	(Finland) Pekka Lyyski
MYPA	Myllykoski, Kouvola	Saviniemi	4,167	(Finland) Janne Lindberg
RoPS	Rovaniemi	Keskuskenttä	3,400	(Finland) Mika Lumijärvi
Tampere United	Tampere	Ratina Stadion	17,000	(Finland) Ari Hjelm
TPS	Turku	Veritas Stadion	9,372	(Finland) Pasi Rautiainen
VPS	Vaasa	Hietalahti Stadium	4,600	(Finland) Petri Vuorinen

=== Managerial changes ===
Team	Outgoing manager	Manner of departure	Date of vacancy	Replaced by	Date of appointment	Position in table
VPS	(Finland) Tomi Kärkkäinen	Resigned	15 May 2009	(Finland) Petri Vuorinen	15 May 2009	14th
RoPS	(Russia) Valeri Bondarenko	Sacked	27 May 2009	(Finland) Mika Lumijärvi (Zambia) Zeddy Saileti	27 May 2009	14th
FF Jaro	(Finland) Mika Laurikainen	Sacked	18 August 2009	(Russia) Alexei Eremenko Sr.	18 August 2009	
Haka	(Finland) Olli Huttunen	Sacked	7 September 2009	(Finland) Sami Ristilä	7 September 2009	5th
RoPS	(Finland) Mika Lumijärvi	Sacked	7 October 2009	(Zambia) Zeddy Saileti (Finland) Jorma Turpeenniemi	7 October 2009	14th

== League table ==
Pos	Team	Pld	W	D	L	GF	GA	GD	Pts	Qualification or relegation
1	HJK (C)	26	14	10	2	45	21	+24	52	Qualification to Champions League second qualifying round
2	FC Honka	26	13	10	3	65	29	+36	49	Qualification to Europa League second qualifying round
3	TPS	26	13	10	3	46	20	+26	49	Qualification to Europa League first qualifying round
4	IFK Mariehamn	26	10	13	3	30	21	+9	43	
5	FC Inter	26	11	7	8	38	30	+8	40	Qualification to Europa League third qualifying round (Note: Inter Turku qualified for the third qualifying round of the UEFA Europa League by winning the 2009 Finnish Cup.)
6	Haka	26	10	7	9	40	35	+5	37	
7	Tampere United	26	11	4	11	31	31	0	37	
8	VPS	26	10	5	11	30	36	−6	35	
9	MYPA	26	9	7	10	32	30	+2	34	Qualification to Europa League first qualifying round (Note: Finland was among the best three associations in the UEFA Fair Play ranking and thus received an additional spot in the first qualifying round of the Europa League.)
10	FF Jaro	26	8	8	10	33	34	−1	32	
11	FC Lahti	26	8	7	11	33	40	−7	31	
12	KuPS	26	6	5	15	29	53	−24	23	
13	JJK (O)	26	3	7	16	25	52	−27	16	Qualification to relegation play-offs
14	RoPS (R)	26	4	4	18	21	66	−45	16	Relegation to Ykkönen

Source: veikkausliiga.com (in Finnish)
Rules for classification: 1) points; 2) goal difference; 3) number of goals scored.
(C) Champions; (O) Play-off winners; (R) Relegated

=== Relegation play-offs ===
JJK as 13th placed team of 2009 Veikkausliiga and KPV as runners-up of the 2009 Ykkönen competed in a two-legged play-offs for one spot in the 2010 Veikkausliiga. JJK won the play-offs by 5–3 and remained in Veikkausliiga.

21 October 2009
15:30 EEST

KPV	2 – 3	JJK
Itälä 24'; Linjala 61'		Kari 40'; Lahtinen 49'; Nam 69'

Kokkolan Keskuskenttä, Kokkola

25 October 2009
14:00 EET

JJK	2 – 1	KPV
Lahtinen 61'; Nam 68'		Kalliokoski 87'

Harjun stadion, Jyväskylä

== Results ==
Home \ Away	HAK	HJK	HON	INT	JAR	JJK	KPS	LAH	MAR	MYP	RPS	TAM	TPS	VPS
Haka		1–2	1–1	2–2	0–0	2–4	3–0	3–0	5–1	2–3	3–1	1–0	0–3	0–1
HJK	3–3		1–1	2–0	1–1	1–1	5–1	1–0	2–0	1–0	4–0	1–0	2–2	2–0
FC Honka	2–0	1–1		2–3	5–1	5–2	4–1	2–2	1–1	0–0	9–0	3–1	0–0	3–0
FC Inter	0–2	1–1	2–1		1–0	3–0	2–3	1–1	1–1	2–1	4–0	2–2	2–0	0–1
FF Jaro	1–0	0–2	3–5	0–1		5–1	1–1	0–1	0–0	3–0	2–0	0–0	1–0	1–3
JJK	0–0	1–1	2–3	1–0	0–2		1–2	2–1	0–2	0–1	1–1	2–2	1–1	1–2
KuPS	5–1	0–3	0–4	0–2	2–2	2–0		1–1	2–2	0–2	3–0	1–2	0–3	3–3
FC Lahti	2–4	1–2	1–1	1–3	2–1	3–1	1–0		1–1	0–1	4–1	2–1	2–4	0–0
IFK Mariehamn	2–1	0–0	2–2	2–0	2–1	3–1	3–0	2–0		0–0	2–1	1–0	1–1	0–0
MYPA	0–2	1–0	1–3	0–0	0–0	4–0	1–2	2–2	1–2		4–0	4–1	2–2	0–2
RoPS	0–0	1–0	1–2	0–2	5–3	2–1	1–0	0–1	0–0	1–1		1–5	0–4	2–3
Tampere United	1–1	1–2	1–0	3–2	0–2	1–0	2–0	0–2	1–0	2–0	3–1		0–2	1–0
TPS	1–2	1–1	0–0	2–0	1–1	0–0	3–0	5–2	0–0	3–1	3–2	1–0		2–0
VPS	0–1	3–4	2–5	2–2	1–2	3–2	1–0	1–0	0–0	0–2	2–0	0–1	0–2	

Source: veikkausliiga.com (in Finnish)
Legend: Blue = home team win; Yellow = draw; Red = away team win.

== Statistics ==
=== Top goalscorers ===
Source: veikkausliiga.com (in Finnish)

Rank	Player	Club	Goals
1	(Finland) Hermanni Vuorinen	Honka	16
2	(Finland) Jami Puustinen	Honka	12
3	(Finland) Timo Furuholm	Inter Turku	11
4	(England) Wayne Brown	TPS	9
4	(Finland) Mikko Paatelainen	TPS	9
4	(Nigeria) Babatunde Wusu	TPS	9
8	(Finland) Tamas Gruborovics	IFK Mariehamn	8
8	(Finland) Juho Mäkelä	HJK	8
8	(Finland) Drilon Shala	Lahti	8
8	(The Gambia) Dawda Bah	HJK	8
8	(Russia) Maxim Votinov	MYPA	8
8	(South Korea) Nam Ik-Kyung	JJK	8

=== Top assistants ===
Source: veikkausliiga.com (in Finnish)

Rank	Player	Club	Assists
1	(Finland) Sebastian Sorsa	HJK	11
2	(Finland) Nicholas Otaru	Honka	9
3	(England) Wayne Brown	TPS	8
3	(Finland) Sebastian Strandvall	Haka	8
3	(Finland) Mikko Innanen	Haka	8
6	(The Gambia) Dawda Bah	HJK	7
6	(Finland) Mika Ojala	Inter Turku	7
6	(Nigeria) Babatunde Wusu	TPS	7
9	(Finland) Mikko Hyyrynen	Jaro	6
9	(Finland) Mikko Manninen	TPS	6
9	(Finland) Severi Paajanen	Inter Turku	6
9	(The Gambia) Demba Savage	Honka	6

== Monthly awards ==
Month	Coach of the Month	Player of the Month
April	(Finland) Pekka Lyyski (IFK Mariehamn)	(Finland) Hermanni Vuorinen (Honka)
May	(Finland) Olli Huttunen (Haka)	(Finland) Sebastian Strandvall (Haka)
June	(Finland) Mika Laurikainen (Jaro)	(Finland) Jens Nygård (VPS)
July	(Finland) Pasi Rautiainen (TPS)	(Finland) Jukka Lehtovaara (TPS)

== Attendances ==
No.	Club	Average
1	TPS	4,904
2	HJK	3,661
3	JJK	3,238
4	VPS	2,415
5	Inter Turku	2,395
6	Tampere	2,257
7	Honka	2,233
8	Lahti	2,082
9	Haka	2,001
10	KuPS	1,837
11	Mariehamn	1,824
12	Jaro	1,650
13	RoPS	1,587
14	MyPa	1,360
