= Jukka Lehtovaara =

Finnish footballer (born 1988)

Personal information
- Date of birth: 15 March 1988 (age 38)
- Place of birth: Turku, Finland
- Height: 1.87 m (6 ft 2 in)
- Position: Goalkeeper

Team information
- Current team: Inter Turku
- Number: 12

Youth career
- TPS

Senior career*
Years	Team	Apps	(Gls)
2006–2014	TPS Turku	165	(0)
2015–2016	Inter Turku	25	(0)

International career
2008–2009	Finland U-21	6	(0)
2010	Finland	1	(0)
- * Club domestic league appearances and goals

Jukka Lehtovaara (born 15 March 1988) is a Finnish retired football goalkeeper.

== Club career ==
He made his debut in 2006. During the 2007 Lehtovaara gained his place as the starting goalie for the team. After the season, he was nominated as the goalkeeper of the year and rookie of the year in Finland. He is generally considered as one of the most promising footballers in Finland. 2009 he was nominated again as the goalkeeper of the year after a terrific season and thus has stirred up a lot of interest in bigger clubs. He continued dominating in the 2010 season as well, winning the goalkeeper of the year award again.

Lehtovaara has played several caps for Finland on different junior levels and he is currently a member of the Finland national under-21 football team. He has also visited the training camps of, for example, West Ham United FC, Liverpool F.C., Chelsea FC, Everton FC and Fulham FC. On 4 November 2010 he is on a one-week trial at West Bromwich.

On 8 December 2014, he signed a two-year contract with FC Inter Turku, but announced his retirement from the game two years later in October 2016 due to recurring injuries.

== International career ==
Lehtovaara made his debut for Finnish national squad on 21 May 2010 against Estonia, playing the first half in a 2–0 away defeat.

== Honours ==
- Finnish Cup: 2010
- Finnish League Cup: 2012

Individual

- Veikkausliiga goalkeeper of the year: 2007, 2009, 2010
- Veikkausliiga Player of the Month: July 2009
