= Hermanni Vuorinen =

Finnish footballer (born 1985)

Personal information
- Full name: Hermanni Karl Anton Vuorinen
- Date of birth: 27 January 1985 (age 41)
- Place of birth: Pori, Finland
- Height: 1.93 m (6 ft 4 in)
- Position: Forward

Senior career*
Years	Team	Apps	(Gls)
2002–2003	Jazz	28	(3)
2003–2004	Werder Bremen II	1	(0)
2004–2005	AC Allianssi	27	(1)
2005–2006	Honka	32	(21)
2006–2008	Fredrikstad	7	(0)
2007–2008	→ HJK (loan)	14	(4)
2008–2010	Honka	64	(31)
2010–2012	Charleroi	18	(1)
2012	Honka	5	(0)
Total		196	(61)

International career
2010	Finland	1	(0)
Medal record
Allianssi
Winner	Finnish League Cup	2004
Runner-up	Veikkausliiga	2004
Winner	Finnish League Cup	2005
Runner-up	Veikkausliiga	2004
Charleroi
Winner	Belgian Second Division	2012
Honka
Runner-up	Finnish Cup	2008
Runner-up	Veikkausliiga	2008
Runner-up	Veikkausliiga	2009
Winner	Finnish League Cup	2010
Winner	Finnish Cup	2012
- * Club domestic league appearances and goals

Hermanni Karl Anton Vuorinen (born 27 January 1985) is a Finnish former professional footballer who played as a forward.

== Club career ==
Vuorinen began his career at FC Jazz but at the age of 18, he tried out for German side Werder Bremen, but got homesick. For the 2005 season he joined FC Honka and helped them gain promotion to the Finnish Premier League (Veikkausliiga). Few thought that they would survive but at the end of September, the team was at the top of the league, receiving top-scoring from Vuorinen with 16 goals in 18 games.

Because of his success, it was announced in August 2006 that Fredrikstad FK had purchased the tall forward, turning down clubs from Italy, Germany, Switzerland and Slovenia. However, he returned to Finland in July 2007. On 31 August 2010, he was signed by R. Charleroi S.C. for a two-year contract with an option for third. He scored his first goal for Charleroi on 16 October 2010 in a 2–1 loss against Lokeren.

He returned to Honka in August 2012.

== International career ==
On 18 January 2010, Vuorinen made his first appearance for the Finland national team at Málaga, Spain in a friendly match against South Korea after Stuart Baxter decide to call him.

== Career statistics ==
As of 1 September 2024.

Appearances and goals by club, season and competition
Club	Season	League			Cup (Note: Includes Suomen Cup)		League cup		Europe		Total	
Club	Season	Division	Apps	Goals	Apps	Goals	Apps	Goals	Apps	Goals	Apps	Goals
Jazz	2002	Veikkausliiga	19	1	–		–		–		19	1
Jazz	2003	Veikkausliiga	9	2	–		–		–		9	2
Jazz	Total		28	3	0	0	0	0	0	0	28	3
Werder Bremen II	2003–04	Regionalliga Nord	1	0	–		–		–		1	0
AC Allianssi	2004	Veikkausliiga	17	0	–		–		2 (Note: Appearances in UEFA Cup)	0	19	0
AC Allianssi	2005	Veikkausliiga	10	1	–		–		–		10	1
AC Allianssi	Total		27	1	0	0	0	0	2	0	29	1
Honka	2005	Ykkönen	15	5	–		–		–		15	5
Honka	2006	Veikkausliiga	17	16	–		–		–		17	16
Honka	Total		32	21	0	0	0	0	0	0	32	21
Fredrikstad	2006	Tippeligaen	6	0	1	0	–		–		7	0
Fredrikstad	2007	Tippeligaen	1	0	0	0	–		–		1	0
Fredrikstad	Total		7	0	1	0	0	0	0	0	8	0
Fredrikstad 2	2007	2. divisjon	1	0	–		–		–		1	0
HJK (loan)	2007	Veikkausliiga	14	4	–		–		3	0	17	4
Honka	2008	Veikkausliiga	24	9	2	0	–		4	0	30	9
Honka	2009	Veikkausliiga	26	16	2	2	5	3	4 (Note: Appearances in UEFA Europa League)	0	37	21
Honka	2010	Veikkausliiga	14	6	0	0	1	2	2	0	17	8
Honka	Total		64	31	4	2	6	5	10	0	84	38
Charleroi	2010–11	Belgian Pro League	11	1	1	0	–		–		12	1
Charleroi	2011–12	Belgian Second Division	7	0	–		–		–		7	0
Charleroi	Total		18	1	1	0	0	0	0	0	19	1
Honka	2012	Veikkausliiga	5	0	0	0	–		–		5	0
Career total			187	61	6	2	6	5	15	0	214	68

== Honours ==
Fredrikstad FK

- Norwegian football cup: 2006
- Finnish League Cup: 2010

Individual

- Veikkausliiga Player of the Month: April 2009
- Veikkausliiga top scorer: 2006, 2009 (16 goals)
