= 2008 Veikkausliiga =

Veikkausliiga
- Season: 2008
- Champions: Inter Turku; 1st Finnish title
- Relegated: KooTeePee
- Champions League: Inter Turku
- Europa League: Honka; Lahti; HJK (via domestic cup)
- Goals: 482
- Average goals/game: 2.65
- Top goalscorer: (Finland) Aleksandr Kokko (Finland) Henri Myntti (13 goals both)
- Biggest home win: Honka 7–0 Haka; Lahti 8–1 KuPS
- Biggest away win: Jaro 0–4 Haka; Haka 0–4 Inter Turku; TPS 0–4 Inter Turku; VPS 0–4 Inter Turku; KooTeePee 0–4 MYPA
- Highest scoring: Lahti 8–1 KuPS

The 2008 season of Veikkausliiga was the 78th season of top-tier football in Finland. It started on 27 April 2008 and ended on 26 October 2008. The defending champions were Tampere United.

== Promotion and relegation ==
AC Oulu finished at the bottom of the 2007 season and therefore were relegated to Ykkönen. Their place was taken by Ykkönen champions KuPS. 13th placed Veikkausliiga team FC Viikingit and Ykkönen runners-up RoPS competed in a two-legged relegation play-offs for one spot in 2008 Veikkausliiga. RoPS won 2–1 on aggregate and therefore were promoted to Veikkausliiga.

== Overview ==
Location of teams in Veikkausliiga 2008

Club	Location	Stadium	Capacity	Manager
FC Haka	Valkeakoski	Tehtaan kenttä	3,516	(Finland) Olli Huttunen
HJK	Helsinki	Finnair Stadium	10,770	(Finland) Antti Muurinen
FC Honka	Espoo	Tapiolan Urheilupuisto	6,000	(Finland) Mika Lehkosuo
FC Inter	Turku	Veritas Stadion	10,000	(Netherlands) Job Dragtsma
FF Jaro	Jakobstad	Jakobstads Centralplan	5,000	(Finland) Mika Laurikainen
FC KooTeePee	Kotka	Arto Tolsa Areena	4,780	(Finland) Tommi Kautonen
KuPS	Kuopio	Magnum Areena	3,500	(Finland) Kai Nyyssönen
FC Lahti	Lahti	Lahden Stadion	15,000	(Finland) Ilkka Mäkelä
IFK Mariehamn	Mariehamn	Wiklöf Holding Arena	1,600	(Finland) Pekka Lyyski
MYPA	Anjalankoski	Saviniemi	4,067	(Finland) Janne Lindberg
RoPS	Rovaniemi	Keskuskenttä	4,000	(Russia) Valeri Bondarenko
Tampere United	Tampere	Ratina Stadion	17,000	(Finland) Ari Hjelm
TPS	Turku	Veritas Stadion	10,000	(Wales) John Allen
VPS	Vaasa	Hietalahti Stadium	4,600	(Finland) Tomi Kärkkäinen

== League table ==
Pos	Team	Pld	W	D	L	GF	GA	GD	Pts	Qualification or relegation
1	FC Inter (C)	26	15	9	2	46	12	+34	54	Qualification to Champions League second qualifying round
2	FC Honka	26	15	5	6	46	23	+23	50	Qualification to Europa League second qualifying round
3	FC Lahti	26	15	3	8	44	24	+20	48	Qualification to Europa League first qualifying round
4	HJK	26	14	5	7	47	29	+18	47	Qualification to Europa League second qualifying round (Note: HJK won the Finnish Cup 2008, thereby qualifying for the second qualifying round of the UEFA Europa League.)
5	MYPA	26	11	9	6	33	21	+12	42	
6	TPS	26	12	6	8	45	36	+9	42	
7	Tampere United	26	9	9	8	41	34	+7	36	
8	Haka	26	10	5	11	31	37	−6	35	
9	FF Jaro	26	10	5	11	36	47	−11	35	
10	RoPS	26	8	6	12	31	37	−6	30	
11	VPS	26	6	11	9	18	29	−11	29	
12	IFK Mariehamn	26	7	5	14	24	40	−16	26	
13	KuPS (O)	26	4	7	15	26	56	−30	19	Qualification to relegation play-offs
14	FC KooTeePee (R)	26	1	5	20	14	57	−43	8	Relegation to Ykkönen

Source: veikkausliiga.com (in Finnish)
Rules for classification: 1) points; 2) goal difference; 3) number of goals scored.
(C) Champions; (O) Play-off winners; (R) Relegated

=== Relegation play-offs ===
KuPS and Ykkönen runners-up FC Viikingit competed in a two-legged play-offs for one spot in Veikkausliiga 2009. KuPS won 2–1 on aggregate and thereby retained their league spot for 2009.

29 October 2008
18:30 GMT+2

FC Viikingit	1 – 2	KuPS
Jäntti 12'	Report (in Finnish)	Koljonen 28'; Venäläinen 32'

Vuosaaren Urheilukenttä, Vuosaari, Helsinki

1 November 2008
13:00 GMT+2

KuPS	0 – 0	FC Viikingit
	Report (in Finnish)

Magnum Areena, Kuopio

== Results ==
Home \ Away	HAK	HJK	HON	INT	JAR	KTP	KPS	LAH	MAR	MYP	RPS	TAM	TPS	VPS
Haka		2–3	1–2	0–4	1–2	1–1	3–0	2–1	1–0	0–3	3–1	1–1	1–2	1–0
HJK	1–2		0–2	3–2	2–3	6–1	0–0	0–1	4–0	1–1	3–2	5–1	1–0	1–0
FC Honka	7–0	1–0		1–1	3–1	2–1	2–1	1–0	2–0	2–0	0–0	3–4	2–2	1–2
FC Inter	1–0	1–1	0–0		2–0	3–0	4–0	1–0	2–0	1–1	3–1	2–2	3–0	2–0
FF Jaro	0–4	1–1	1–0	0–1		2–1	3–2	2–2	1–2	2–1	1–1	1–4	2–3	2–2
FC KooTeePee	0–2	0–1	0–0	0–2	1–4		1–1	0–1	1–0	0–4	0–2	1–3	0–2	0–0
KuPS	0–1	3–2	1–2	1–1	2–0	2–0		2–3	3–1	1–4	0–1	1–1	0–3	0–0
FC Lahti	1–0	1–2	1–0	0–1	1–2	1–0	8–1		2–1	4–0	3–0	2–2	4–1	1–0
IFK Mariehamn	2–1	0–2	3–2	1–1	1–2	4–2	1–1	0–1		0–0	2–1	1–4	2–1	0–2
MYPA	1–1	1–3	0–2	0–0	3–0	2–0	4–1	2–0	0–2		1–0	1–0	1–0	0–0
RoPS	1–2	2–0	0–2	0–0	1–3	3–0	4–0	2–2	3–1	1–1		2–1	1–0	0–1
Tampere United	1–1	1–2	1–2	1–0	0–0	4–2	2–0	0–2	1–0	0–2	5–0		1–1	1–1
TPS	2–0	1–3	2–1	0–4	4–0	4–1	3–3	2–1	0–0	0–0	2–2	1–0		6–1
VPS	0–0	0–0	1–4	0–4	2–1	1–1	2–0	0–1	0–0	0–0	1–0	0–0	2–3	

Source: veikkausliiga.com (in Finnish)
Legend: Blue = home team win; Yellow = draw; Red = away team win.

== Top goalscorers ==
Source: veikkausliiga.com (in Finnish)

Rank	Player	Club	Goals
1	(Finland) Aleksandr Kokko	Honka	13
1	(Finland) Henri Myntti	Tampere United	13
3	(Finland) Mikko Hyyrynen	Jaro	11
3	(Finland) Toni Lehtinen	Haka	11
3	(Finland) Mikko Paatelainen	TPS	11
3	(Brazil) Rafael	Lahti	11
8	(Finland) Jarno Parikka	HJK	9
8	(Finland) Hermanni Vuorinen	Honka	9
10	(Estonia) Tarmo Neemelo	MYPA	8
10	(Finland) Mika Ojala	Inter Turku	8
10	(Finland) Paulus Roiha	HJK	8

== Annual awards ==
Source: Veikkausliigan parhaat kaudella 2008 nimetty (in Finnish)

=== Players' Association's awards ===
- Player of the Year: Dominic Chatto (Inter Turku)
- Young player of the Year: Aleksandr Kokko (Honka)
- Referee of the Year: Tero Nieminen

=== Veikkausliiga's awards ===
- Goalkeeper of the Year: Patrick Bantamoi (Inter Turku)
- Defender of the Year: Jos Hooiveld (Inter Turku)
- Midfielder of the Year: Mika Ojala (Inter Turku)
- Attacker of the Year: Aleksandr Kokko (Honka)

== Attendances ==
No.	Club	Average
1	HJK	4,516
2	TPS	4,501
3	Inter Turku	4,432
4	Honka	3,156
5	Tampere	2,924
6	Lahti	2,532
7	VPS	2,263
8	Jaro	2,131
9	KuPS	1,859
10	RoPS	1,843
11	KooTeePee	1,773
12	Haka	1,717
13	Mariehamn	1,603
14	MyPa	1,574
