= Jens Nygård =

Finnish footballer (born 1978)

Personal information
- Date of birth: 8 January 1978 (age 48)
- Place of birth: Närpes, Finland
- Height: 1.89 m (6 ft 2 1/2 in)
- Position: Defender

Team information
- Current team: Vaasan Palloseura
- Number: 14

Senior career*
Years	Team	Apps	(Gls)
1997–2003	Närpes Kraft		
2005–	Vaasan Palloseura	142	(8)
- * Club domestic league appearances and goals as of 7 August 2010

Jens Nygård (born 8 January 1978) is a Finnish footballer who represents Vaasan Palloseura of Veikkausliiga.

== Honours ==
Individual

- Veikkausliiga Player of the Month: June 2009,
