= Lasse Linjala =

Finnish footballer (born 1987)

Personal information
- Date of birth: 15 August 1987 (age 39)
- Place of birth: Pieksämäki, Finland
- Height: 1.89 m (6 ft 2 1/2 in)
- Position: Striker

Senior career*
Years	Team	Apps	(Gls)
2003–2005	SaPa	50	(19)
2006–2008	Warkaus JK	59	(29)
2006–2007	→ Warkaus JK/2	4	(0)
2009	KPV Kokkola	25	(7)
2010–2012	JJK Jyväskylä	42	(5)
2012	→ FC KooTeePee (loan)	5	(3)
2013	FC Haka	15	(2)
2013	→ Härmä (loan)	3	(0)
2013	→ MP (loan)	5	(2)
2014	VPS	17	(1)
2015–2016	VIFK	37	(13)
2017–2018	SaPa		
- * Club domestic league appearances and goals

Lasse Linjala (born 15 August 1987) is a Finnish former footballer who played as a striker.
