= 2005 Veikkausliiga =

Veikkausliiga
- Season: 2005
- Champions: MyPa; 1st Finnish title
- Relegated: RoPS, TP-47
- Champions League: MyPa
- UEFA Cup: HJK, FC Haka
- Matches: 182
- Goals: 474 (2.6 per match)
- Top goalscorer: (Finland) Juho Mäkelä (16)
- Biggest home win: FC Haka 8 - 0 AC Allianssi
- Highest scoring: FC Haka 8 - 0 AC Allianssi; FC KooTeePee 5 - 3 HJK; TP-47 3 - 5 TPS

The 2005 season of the Finnish Veikkausliiga was won by MyPa.

== League table ==
Pos	Team	Pld	W	D	L	GF	GA	GD	Pts	Qualification or relegation
1	MyPa (C)	26	17	5	4	51	18	+33	56	Qualification to Champions League first qualifying round
2	HJK Helsinki	26	15	7	4	43	26	+17	52	Qualification to UEFA Cup first qualifying round
3	Tampere United	26	15	6	5	38	21	+17	51	Qualification to Intertoto Cup first round
4	FC Haka	26	13	11	2	47	19	+28	50	Qualification to UEFA Cup first qualifying round (Note: FC Haka as winners of the 2005 Finnish Cup qualified for the first qualifying round of the 2006–07 UEFA Cup.)
5	Inter Turku	26	12	8	6	37	20	+17	44	
6	FC Lahti	26	11	5	10	39	36	+3	38	
7	AC Allianssi	26	8	10	8	33	41	−8	34	
8	FC KooTeePee	26	9	6	11	35	42	−7	33	
9	TPS	26	8	6	12	30	35	−5	30	
10	KuPS	26	8	5	13	32	45	−13	29	
11	FF Jaro	26	6	8	12	21	31	−10	26	
12	IFK Mariehamn	26	6	5	15	27	42	−15	23	
13	RoPS (C)	26	3	8	15	18	50	−32	17	Qualification to relegation play-offs
14	TP-47 (C)	26	4	4	18	22	47	−25	16	Relegation to Ykkönen

Source: Finland - List of final tables (RSSSF)
(C) Champions

== Results ==
Home \ Away	ALL	HAK	HJK	IFK	INT	JAR	KTP	KPS	LAH	MYP	RPS	TAM	TPS	T47
AC Allianssi		2–2	1–2	3–1	2–3	1–2	1–2	1–1	3–1	1–3	1–1	1–0	3–3	1–0
FC Haka	8–0 (Note: This match was the subject of a police investigation into match fixing, eventually leading to the demise of AC Allianssi.)		2–0	3–1	1–1	2–1	1–1	1–0	0–0	1–0	4–0	1–3	6–0	2–0
HJK Helsinki	2–2	1–0		0–0	2–1	1–0	2–2	0–1	2–1	1–0	7–0	0–2	3–1	2–0
IFK Mariehamn	0–0	0–1	3–4		0–1	3–1	2–0	2–4	2–0	0–1	1–0	0–0	0–1	4–2
Inter Turku	0–0	0–1	0–0	4–0		2–2	2–0	3–2	4–0	1–4	2–0	0–1	2–0	1–0
Jaro	1–1	0–1	0–0	0–0	0–0		6–1	2–1	0–0	0–0	2–0	1–3	1–0	0–2
KooTeePee	1–2	3–3	5–3	3–1	0–2	2–0		0–2	2–0	2–2	0–0	3–0	1–0	0–3
KuPS	1–2	0–0	1–2	2–2	0–3	1–0	2–1		1–4	0–3	2–1	0–2	1–1	3–1
Lahti	4–1	0–0	1–2	3–0	1–0	4–0	1–1	2–1		1–4	4–1	3–1	1–0	1–4
MyPa	0–0	2–3	1–1	2–1	1–1	0–2	2–1	3–0	3–1		5–1	3–0	1–0	5–0
RoPS	1–3	2–2	0–2	1–0	0–0	1–0	0–1	3–4	1–1	0–2		0–1	0–0	0–0
Tampere United	2–0	0–0	1–1	1–0	3–0	2–0	0–0	3–1	2–1	0–1	3–3		2–2	4–0
TPS	0–0	0–0	0–1	1–3	2–0	3–1	3–1	0–1	4–1	0–2	3–0	0–1		1–0
TP-47	0–1	2–2	1–2	1–1	0–0	0–2	3–1	0–3	0–2	0–1	0–2	0–1	3–5	

Source: Finland - List of final tables (RSSSF)
Legend: Blue = home team win; Yellow = draw; Red = away team win.

== Overview ==
Club	Location	Stadium	Capacity
AC Allianssi	Vantaa	Pohjola Stadion	4,700
Haka	Valkeakoski	Tehtaan kenttä	3,516
HJK Helsinki	Helsinki	Finnair Stadium	10,770
IFK Mariehamn	Mariehamn	Wiklöf Holding Arena	1,600
Inter Turku	Turku	Veritas Stadion	10,000
FF Jaro	Jakobstad	Jakobstads Centralplan	5,000
KooTeePee	Kotka	Arto Tolsa Areena	4,780
KuPS	Kuopio	Magnum Areena	3,500
FC Lahti	Lahti	Lahden Stadion	15,000
MyPa	Anjalankoski	Saviniemi	4,067
RoPS	Rovaniemi	Keskuskenttä	4,000
Tampere United	Tampere	Ratina Stadion	17,000
TPS	Turku	Veritas Stadion	10,000
TP-47	Tornio	Pohjan Stadion	3,000

== Attendances ==
No.	Club	Average
1	HJK	4,684
2	Tampere	3,957
3	TPS	3,443
4	Inter Turku	3,006
5	KooTeePee	2,865
6	KuPS	2,752
7	Mariehamn	2,598
8	Jaro	2,576
9	Lahti	2,416
10	MyPa	2,236
11	TP-47	2,086
12	Haka	1,767
13	RoPS	1,686
14	Allianssi	1,664
