= 2006 Veikkausliiga =

Veikkausliiga
- Season: 2006
- Champions: Tampere United; 2nd Finnish title
- Relegated: KuPS
- Champions League: Tampere United
- UEFA Cup: HJK, MyPa, FC Haka
- Matches: 156
- Goals: 410 (2.63 per match)
- Top goalscorer: (Finland) Hermanni Vuorinen (16)
- Biggest home win: TPS 7 - 0 FC KooTeePee
- Biggest away win: KuPS 0 - 5 TPS
- Highest scoring: TPS 7 - 0 FC KooTeePee; FF Jaro 2 - 5 FC Honka

The 2006 season of the Veikkausliiga the 17th season in the league's history, which began on April 19 and ended on October 29.
The league was originally supposed to have 14 teams, but AC Allianssi was refused a license, so the league was subsequently played with only 13 teams.

Location of teams in 2006 Veikkausliiga

== Table ==
| Pos | Team | Pld | W | D | L | GF | GA | GD | Pts | Qualification or relegation |
|---|---|---|---|---|---|---|---|---|---|---|
| 1 | Tampere United (C) | 24 | 16 | 3 | 5 | 39 | 18 | +21 | 51 | Qualification to Champions League first qualifying round |
| 2 | HJK | 24 | 13 | 6 | 5 | 45 | 18 | +27 | 45 | Qualification to UEFA Cup first qualifying round (Note: FC Haka gained HJK's UEFA Cup place as HJK won the Finnish Cup. The Intertoto Cup place was given to FC Honka.) |
| 3 | FC Haka | 24 | 13 | 5 | 6 | 37 | 24 | +13 | 44 | Qualification to UEFA Cup first qualifying round |
| 4 | FC Honka | 24 | 13 | 3 | 8 | 50 | 32 | +18 | 42 | Qualification to Intertoto Cup first round |
| 5 | IFK Mariehamn | 24 | 10 | 7 | 7 | 31 | 22 | +9 | 37 | |
| 6 | MyPa | 24 | 10 | 4 | 10 | 25 | 26 | −1 | 34 | Qualification to UEFA Cup first qualifying round (Note: MyPa were awarded a place in the UEFA Cup as Fair Play Award winners.) |
| 7 | TPS | 24 | 9 | 4 | 11 | 35 | 38 | −3 | 31 | |
| 8 | FC Lahti | 24 | 9 | 4 | 11 | 26 | 34 | −8 | 31 | |
| 9 | VPS | 24 | 8 | 5 | 11 | 26 | 36 | −10 | 29 | |
| 10 | FC Inter | 24 | 7 | 7 | 10 | 25 | 35 | −10 | 28 | |
| 11 | FC KooTeePee | 24 | 8 | 3 | 13 | 26 | 44 | −18 | 27 | |
| 12 | FF Jaro | 24 | 4 | 7 | 13 | 27 | 42 | −15 | 19 | |
| 13 | KuPS (R) | 24 | 5 | 4 | 15 | 18 | 41 | −23 | 19 | Relegation to Ykkönen |

Source: RSSSF
Rules for classification: 1) points; 2) goal difference; 3) number of goals scored.
(C) Champions; (R) Relegated

== Results ==
| Home \ Away | HAK | HJK | HON | INT | JAR | KTP | KUP | LAH | IFK | MYP | TAM | TPS | VPS |
|---|---|---|---|---|---|---|---|---|---|---|---|---|---|
| FC Haka | | 2–2 | 2–0 | 0–0 | 3–1 | 3–1 | 2–1 | 1–1 | 1–0 | 1–2 | 0–3 | 0–1 | 4–1 |
| HJK | 1–2 | | 3–0 | 5–0 | 4–0 | 5–0 | 1–0 | 0–1 | 0–0 | 4–1 | 0–3 | 3–2 | 3–0 |
| FC Honka | 0–2 | 0–0 | | 6–0 | 3–2 | 4–1 | 4–0 | 5–0 | 2–1 | 2–2 | 1–3 | 0–1 | 2–1 |
| FC Inter | 1–3 | 0–1 | 2–1 | | 2–2 | 0–0 | 1–1 | 0–1 | 1–1 | 1–0 | 0–1 | 0–0 | 2–0 |
| FF Jaro | 0–0 | 2–0 | 2–5 | 1–5 | | 0–0 | 1–0 | 1–2 | 1–3 | 1–3 | 1–2 | 5–0 | 1–1 |
| FC KooTeePee | 0–2 | 2–1 | 1–2 | 3–1 | 2–1 | | 3–1 | 2–1 | 1–2 | 0–1 | 1–0 | 0–3 | 2–0 |
| KuPS | 1–2 | 0–2 | 2–2 | 2–1 | 2–1 | 1–1 | | 0–0 | 1–2 | 1–0 | 0–2 | 0–5 | 1–2 |
| FC Lahti | 2–2 | 0–2 | 1–3 | 1–2 | 3–1 | 0–4 | 2–0 | | 3–0 | 0–2 | 0–2 | 3–1 | 1–0 |
| IFK Mariehamn | 2–1 | 0–0 | 1–2 | 0–1 | 0–0 | 4–1 | 2–0 | 1–1 | | 1–0 | 1–0 | 0–1 | 0–1 |
| MyPa | 0–1 | 0–0 | 2–1 | 1–0 | 2–0 | 2–0 | 3–0 | 1–0 | 0–2 | | 0–2 | 1–3 | 1–2 |
| Tampere United | 1–0 | 0–2 | 2–1 | 3–1 | 0–0 | 1–0 | 1–0 | 3–1 | 2–2 | 1–1 | | 4–2 | 2–3 |
| TPS | 1–2 | 1–4 | 0–2 | 2–2 | 0–3 | 7–0 | 1–2 | 1–0 | 0–4 | 0–0 | 0–1 | | 2–1 |
| VPS | 2–1 | 2–2 | 1–2 | 0–2 | 0–0 | 2–1 | 0–2 | 0–2 | 2–2 | 3–0 | 1–0 | 1–1 | |

Legend: Blue = home team win; Yellow = draw; Red = away team win.

== European results ==
Champions League:

- MyPa prevailed in the first round against The New Saints, but was knocked out by FC Copenhagen in the second round

UEFA Cup:

- HJK lost the first round to Drogheda United
- FC Haka lost the first round to FC Levadia Tallinn

Intertoto Cup:

- Tampere United won the first round against Carmarthen Town F.C., but was knocked out by Kalmar FF in the second round

== Promotions and relegations ==
- The 2007 season is once again being contested by 14 teams. Only one team, KuPS, was relegated, while two teams from Division 1 were promoted, being FC Viikingit and AC Oulu.

== Top goal scorers ==
| Position | Player | Country | Team | Goals |
|---|---|---|---|---|
| 1 | Hermanni Vuorinen | (Finland) | FC Honka | 16 |
| 2 | Rafael | (Brazil) | FC Lahti | 13 |
| 3 | Farid Ghazi | (Algeria) | HJK | 12 |
| 4 | Ville Lehtinen | (Finland) | Tampere Utd | 11 |
| - | Mikko Paatelainen | (Finland) | FF Jaro | 11 |
| - | Antti Pohja | (Finland) | HJK | 11 |
| 7 | Ady | (Brazil) / (Tunisia) | TPS | 10 |
| - | Valtter Laaksonen | (Finland) | FC Inter | 10 |

== Attendances ==
| No. | Club | Average |
|---|---|---|
| 1 | HJK | 5,580 |
| 2 | Honka | 4,255 |
| 3 | Tampere | 3,944 |
| 4 | TPS | 3,571 |
| 5 | KooTeePee | 2,829 |
| 6 | Inter Turku | 2,684 |
| 7 | Jaro | 2,554 |
| 8 | VPS | 2,483 |
| 9 | KuPS | 2,359 |
| 10 | Lahti | 2,052 |
| 11 | Haka | 2,010 |
| 12 | Mariehamn | 1,839 |
| 13 | MyPa | 1,662 |
