= Nam Ik-kyung =

South Korean retired football player (born 1983)

Nam Ik-Kyung
Personal information
- Full name: Nam Ik-Kyung
- Date of birth: 26 January 1983 (age 43)
- Place of birth: South Korea
- Height: 1.77 m (5 ft 10 in)
- Position: Forward

Youth career
- 1999–2001: Pohang Jecheol Technical High School

Senior career*
Years	Team	Apps	(Gls)
2002–2006	Pohang Steelers	19	(1)
2007–2008	Gwangju Sangmu (Army)	27	(2)
2009–2010	JJK	25	(10)
2010	FC Haka	11	(4)
- * Club domestic league appearances and goals as of 28 February 2011

Nam Ik-Kyung (Korean: 남익경; born 26 January 1983) is a South Korean retired football player. In March 2009 he signed a tryout agreement with Finnish team JJK.

== Career statistics ==
As of 28 February 2011 (UTC)

Club performance			League		Cup		League Cup		Continental		Total	
Season	Club	League	Apps	Goals	Apps	Goals	Apps	Goals	Apps	Goals	Apps	Goals
South Korea			League		KFA Cup		League Cup		Asia		Total	
2002	Pohang Steelers	K-League	0	0			0	0	-		0	0
2003	Pohang Steelers	K-League	8	1	3	0	-		-		11	1
2004	Pohang Steelers	K-League	5	0	0	0	7	1	-		12	1
2005	Pohang Steelers	K-League	6	0	0	0	7	0	-		13	0
2006	Pohang Steelers	K-League	0	0	1	0	3	1	-		4	1
2007	Gwangju Sangmu	K-League	15	0	1	0	3	0	-		19	0
2008	Gwangju Sangmu	K-League	12	2	2	1	8	0	-		22	3
Finland			League		Finnish Cup		League Cup		Europe		Total	
2009	JJK	Veikkausliiga	23	8	?	?	?	?	-		23	8
2010	FC Haka	Veikkausliiga	11	4	?	?	?	?	-		11	4
Total	South Korea		46	3	7	1	28	2	-		81	6
Total	Finland		34	12					-		36	14
Career total			80	15	7	1	28	2	-		117	20
