= Mikko Innanen (footballer) =

Finnish footballer (born 1982)

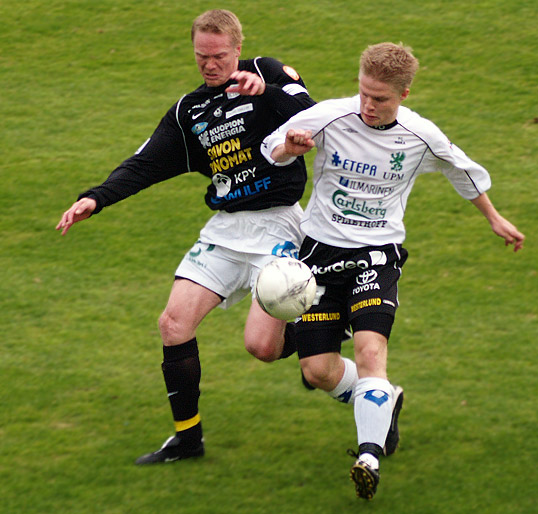

Personal information
- Date of birth: 8 September 1982 (age 44)
- Place of birth: Tampere, Finland
- Height: 1.70 m (5 ft 7 in)
- Position: Striker

Team information
- Current team: Ilves-Kissat (manager)

Senior career*
Years	Team	Apps	(Gls)
1999	TPV	2	(0)
2000–2010	FC Haka	221	(45)
2011	MYPA	33	(5)
2012–2013	JJK	62	(13)
2014–2015	FC Haka	31	(0)
2016–2017	TPV	26	(2)

International career
2008	Finland B	1	(0)

Managerial career
- 2018–2019: TPV (assistant)
- 2020–2021: TPV
- 2022–: Ilves-Kissat
- * Club domestic league appearances and goals

Mikko Innanen (born 8 September 1982) is a Finnish football coach and a former midfielder. He is the manager of Ilves-Kissat.
