= Jami Puustinen =

Finnish footballer (born 1987)

Personal information
- Full name: Jami Petteri Puustinen
- Date of birth: 9 January 1987 (age 39)
- Place of birth: Espoo, Finland
- Height: 1.89 m (6 ft 2 in)
- Position: Striker

Youth career
- 1995–2000: FC Kasiysi
- 2000–2003: FC Espoo
- 2003–2006: Manchester United

Senior career*
Years	Team	Apps	(Gls)
2006–2011	FC Honka	123	(38)
2012	FC Haka	15	(5)

International career
2005–2006	Finland U21	9	(1)
- * Club domestic league appearances and goals as of 23 February 2013

Jami Petteri Puustinen (born 9 January 1987) is a Finnish former football player. Born in Espoo, Puustinen began his career with FC Kasiysi at the age of eight in 1995, before signing for FC Espoo in 2000. After going on trial with Manchester United in July 2003, Puustinen attracted attention from several big European clubs, before signing a three-year contract with United on 29 September 2003. However, Puustinen never made a senior appearance for Manchester United and he was released in January 2006. He then returned to Finland to sign for newly promoted FC Honka.

After the 2011 season his contract with Honka expired and he became a free agent. On 21 February 2012 it was announced that Puustinen had signed a 1+1 year contract with fellow Finnish team, FC Haka.

Puustinen was a regular member of the Finland national under-21 football team.
