= Lahti Stadium =

Sports venue in Lahti, Finland

- Skiing stadium
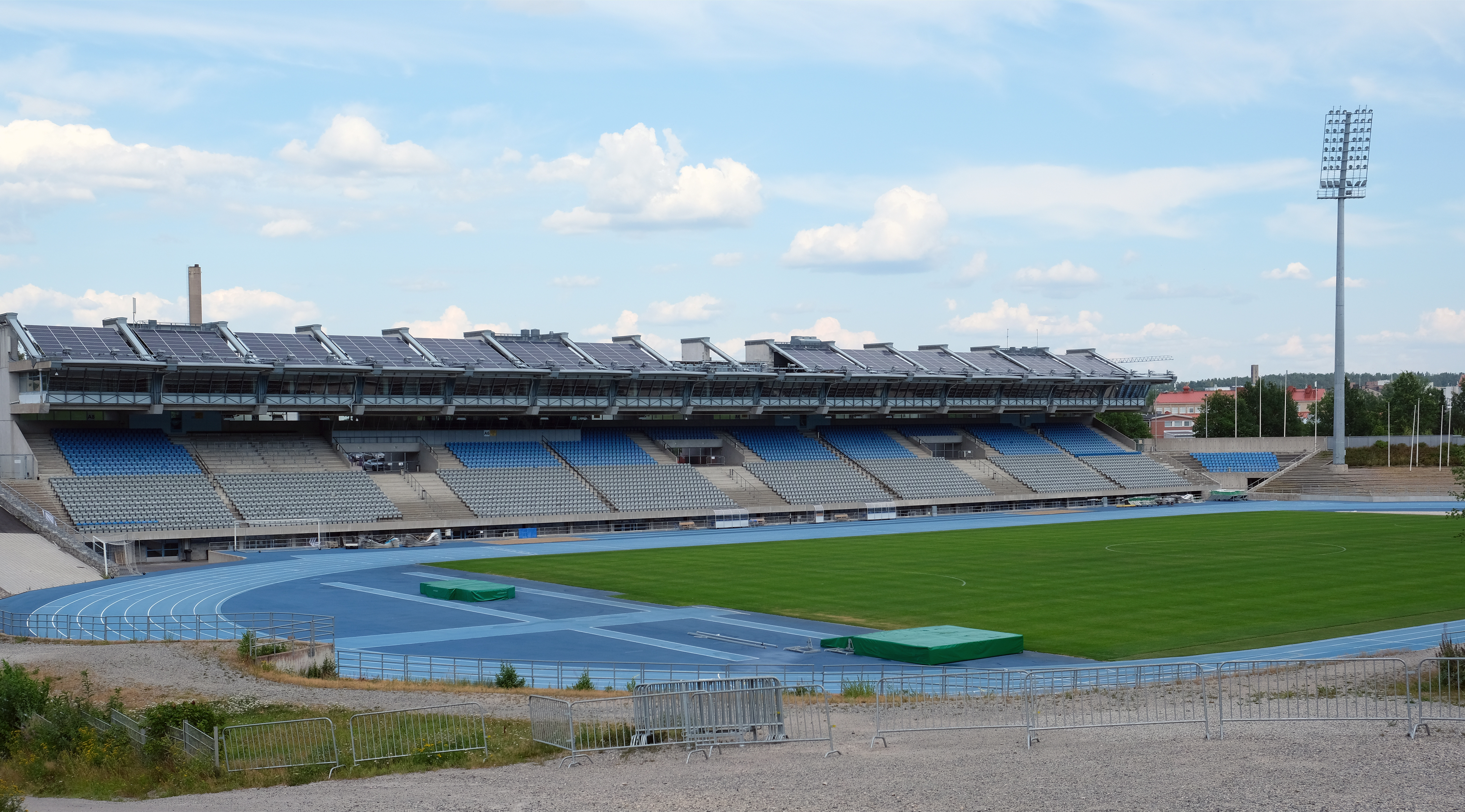
- Interactive map of Lahti Stadium
- Full name: Lahden stadion
- Location: Lahti, Finland
- Coordinates: 60°58′59″N 025°38′03″E
- Owner: City of Lahti
- Operator: City of Lahti
- Capacity: 14,465 (7,465 seating, 7,000 standing)
- Surface: Grass
- Field size: 103 × 67 m

Construction
- Opened: 1981
- Renovated: 2003

Tenant
- FC Lahti

Lahti Stadium (Finnish: Lahden stadion) is a multi-use stadium in Lahti, Finland. In Winter, the stadium is used in cross-country skiing and biathlon. In summer it is currently used mostly for football matches and is the home stadium of FC Lahti. The stadium holds 14,500 spectators and was built in 1981.

Lahti Stadium is a well-known venue for cross-country skiing and biathlon. Along with neighboring ski jumping hills, it has hosted three FIS Nordic World Ski Championships (1989, 2001, and 2017) and numerous Cross-Country World Cup events, the first being held on 6 March 1982. In biathlon, the stadium has been the venue for three World Championships (1981, 1991, and 2000) and also the World Cup for many years.

== Gallery ==
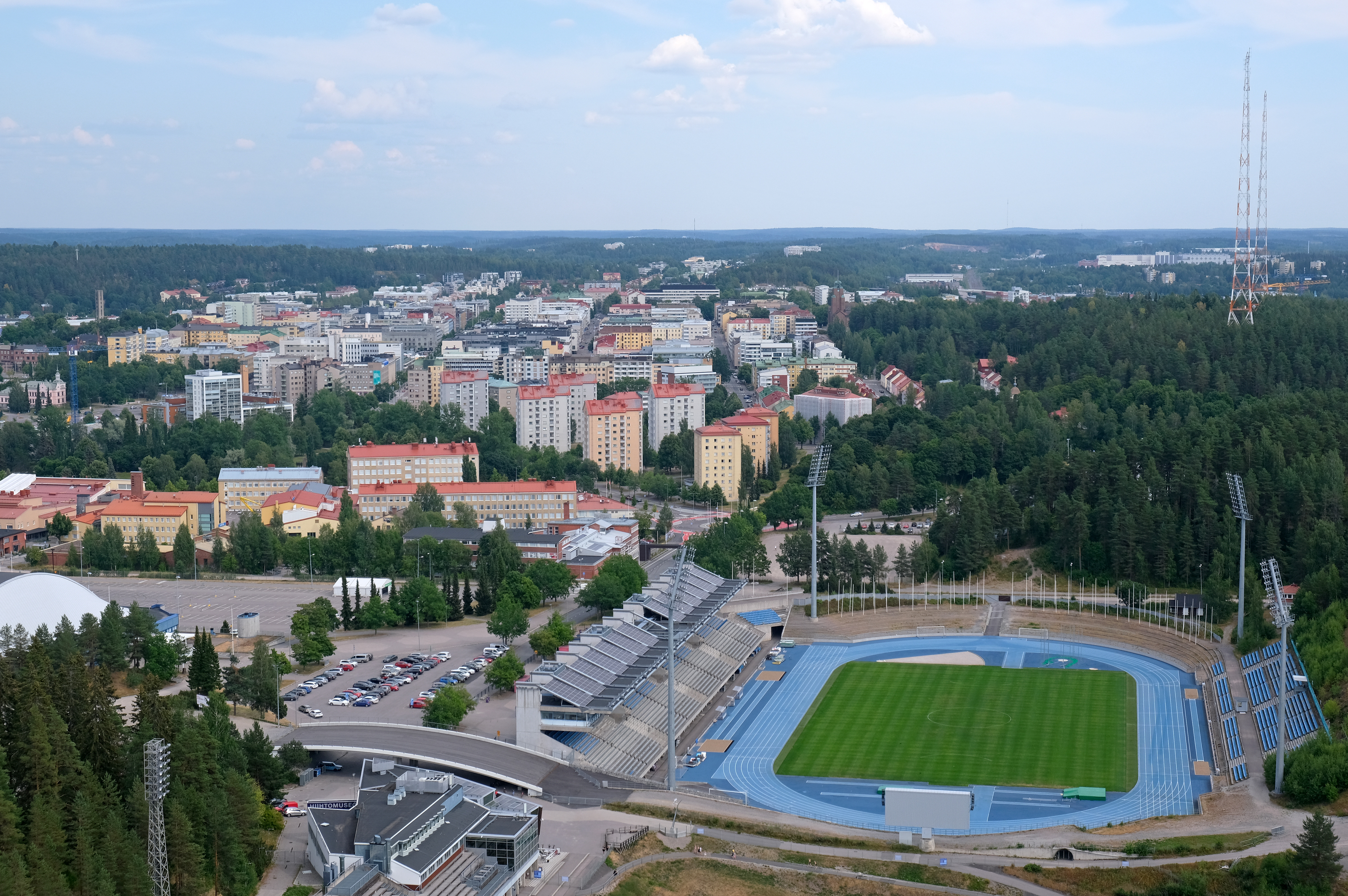
Aerial view

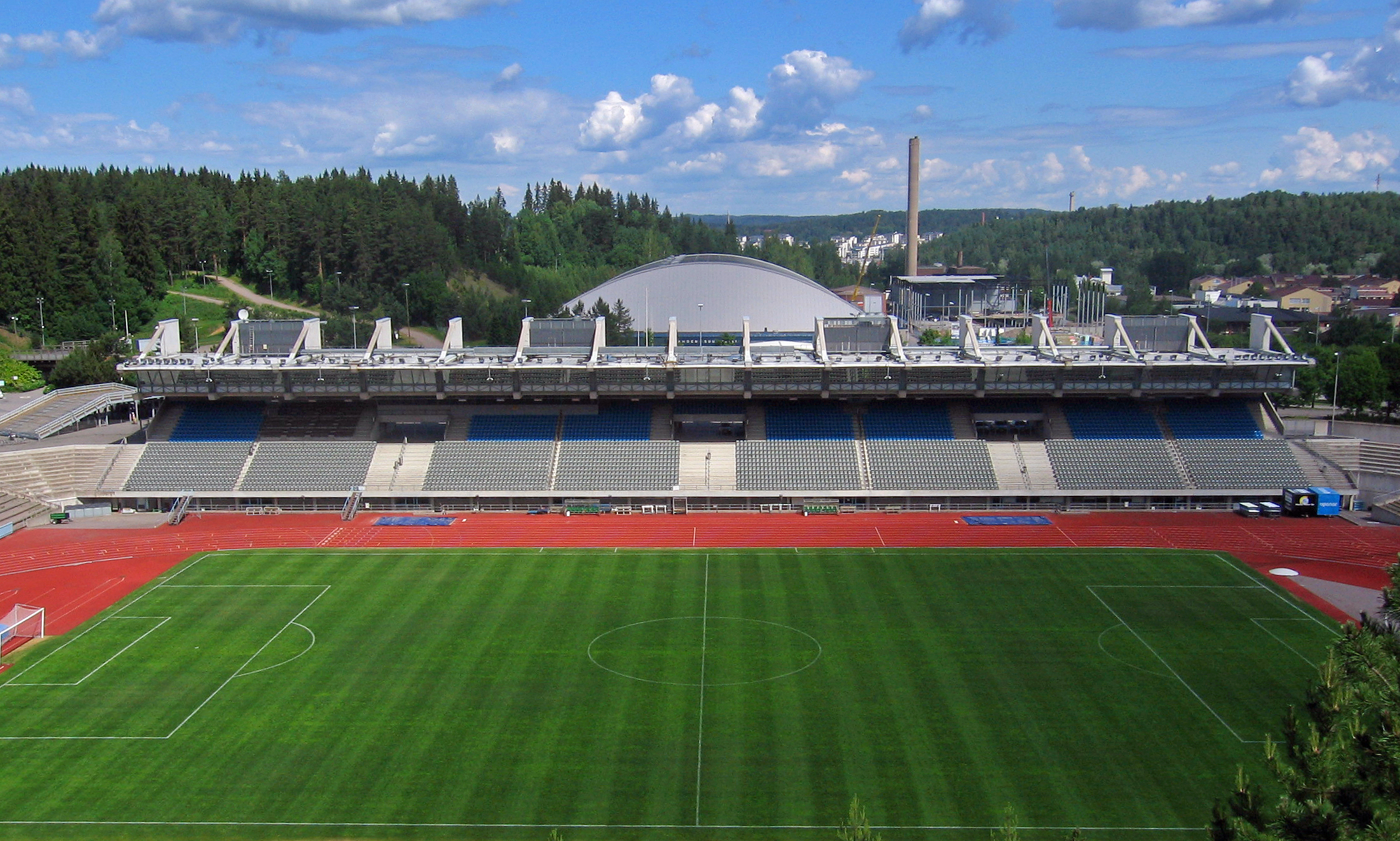
Football pitch

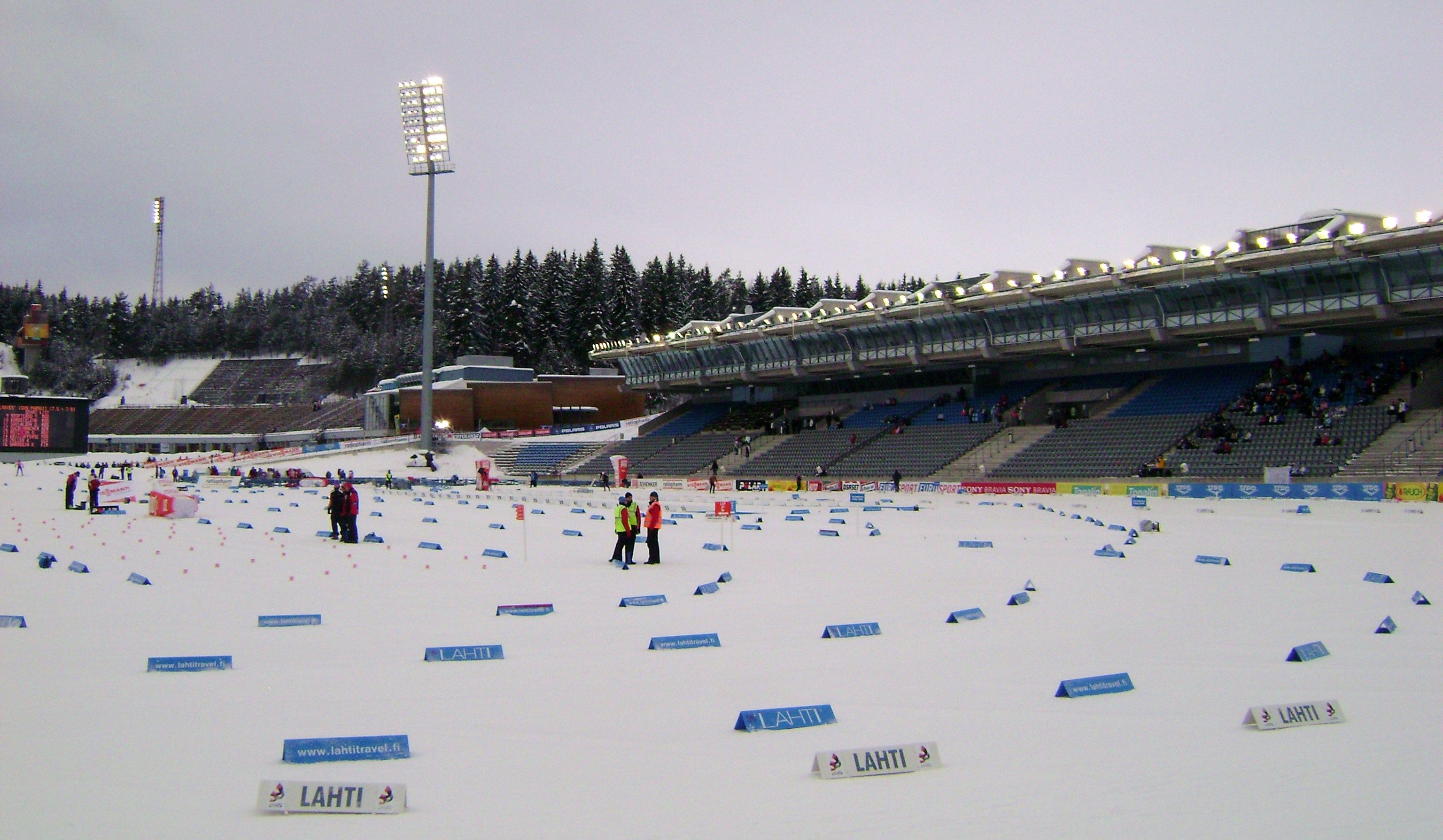
Stadium in March during the Salpausselkä Games

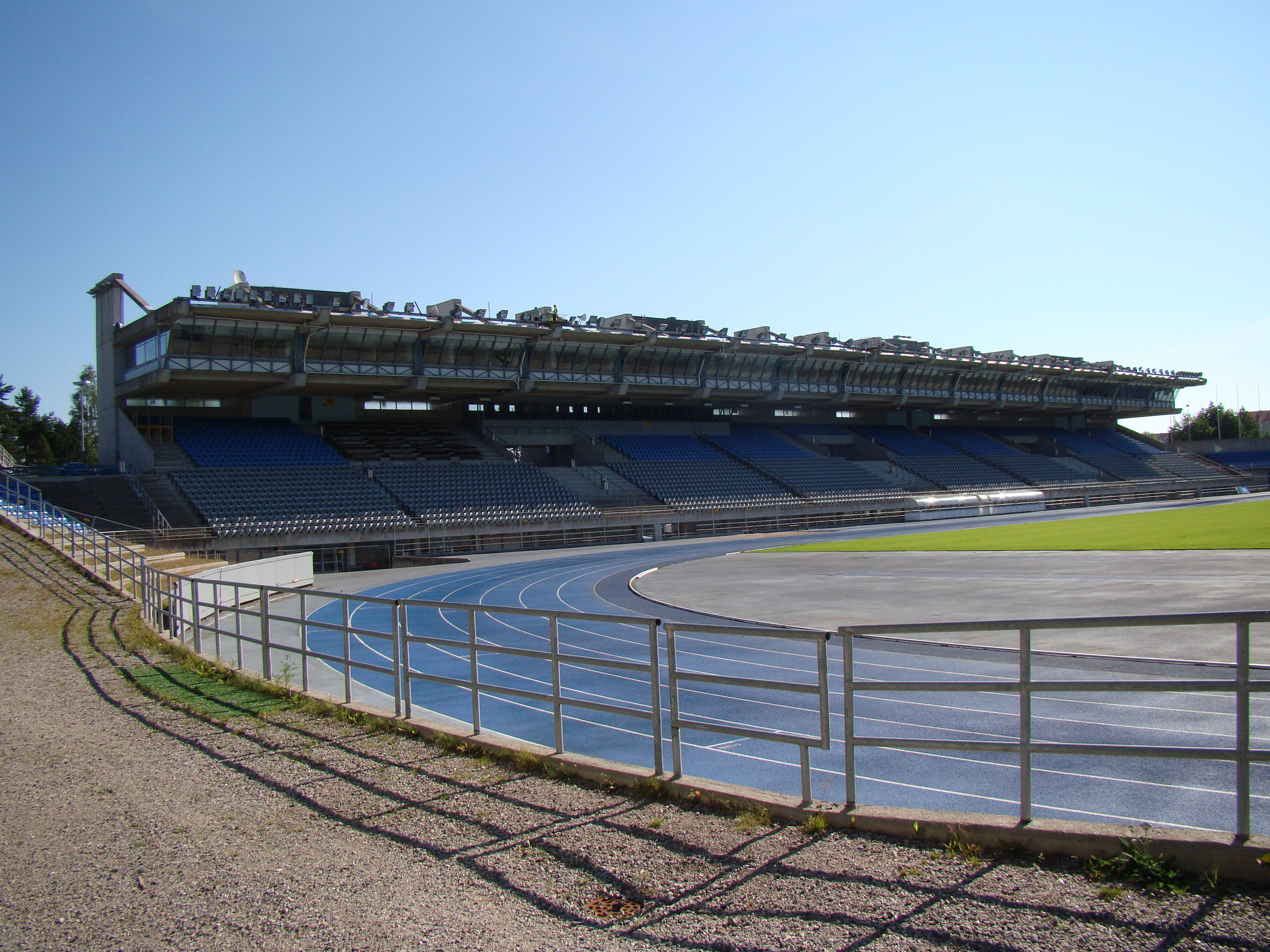
main stand
