= 2007 Veikkausliiga =

Veikkausliiga
- Season: 2007
- Champions: Tampere United; 3rd Finnish title
- Relegated: AC Oulu, FC Viikingit
- Champions League: Tampere United
- UEFA Cup: FC Haka, FC Honka
- Matches: 182
- Goals: 458 (2.52 per match)
- Average goals/game: 2,52
- Top goalscorer: (Brazil) Rafael (14)
- Biggest home win: FC Lahti 6 - 0 VPS
- Biggest away win: FC Viikingit 0 - 4 FC Lahti
- Highest scoring: FC Lahti 5 - 2 FF Jaro

The 2007 season of the Veikkausliiga (the premier league of the Finnish football system), the 18th season in the league's history, began on April 21.

== Final league table ==
Location of teams in 2013 Veikkausliiga

Pos	Team	Pld	W	D	L	GF	GA	GD	Pts	Qualification or relegation
1	Tampere United (C)	26	16	6	4	45	27	+18	54	Qualification to Champions League first qualifying round
2	FC Haka	26	13	7	6	39	23	+16	46	Qualification to UEFA Cup first qualifying round
3	TPS	26	13	4	9	43	33	+10	43	Qualification to Intertoto Cup first round
4	FC Honka	26	10	11	5	34	25	+9	41	Qualification to UEFA Cup first qualifying round (Note: As Tampere United are guaranteed European football in the Champions League as league champions, their spot in the UEFA Cup as Finnish Cup winners is transferred to the losing finalist. FC Honka will therefore play in the 2008–09 season of the UEFA Cup)
5	MyPa	26	11	7	8	29	26	+3	40	
6	IFK Mariehamn	26	9	10	7	31	30	+1	37	
7	HJK	26	7	13	6	31	25	+6	34	
8	FC Lahti	26	9	6	11	38	34	+4	33	
9	FC Inter	26	9	6	11	32	28	+4	33	
10	VPS	26	7	11	8	26	35	−9	32	
11	FF Jaro	26	7	7	12	30	41	−11	28	
12	FC KooTeePee	26	7	5	14	27	38	−11	26	
13	FC Viikingit (R)	26	5	8	13	25	44	−19	23	Qualification to relegation play-offs
14	AC Oulu (R)	26	5	7	14	28	49	−21	22	Relegation to Ykkönen

Source: rsssf.com
Rules for classification: 1) points; 2) goal difference; 3) number of goals scored.
(C) Champions; (R) Relegated
Notes:

Veikkausliiga 2007 winners

Third title

=== Relegation playoff ===
RoPS of the Ykkönen beat FC Viikingit for a place in the 2008 season of the Veikkausliiga.

== Results ==
Home \ Away	HAK	HJK	HON	INT	JAR	KTP	LAH	MAR	MYP	OUL	TAM	TPS	VPS	VII
FC Haka		3–3	1–1	1–0	4–0	3–0	1–2	1–2	0–0	2–0	1–2	2–1	1–0	1–0
HJK	2–1		0–1	2–0	2–2	1–1	0–2	2–2	5–0	0–0	0–2	3–0	0–0	1–1
FC Honka	0–2	0–0		1–2	2–2	0–0	0–0	2–0	2–1	2–0	1–2	2–0	1–0	1–1
FC Inter	3–1	1–1	1–1		5–2	1–0	0–1	0–2	1–2	1–0	1–1	1–1	5–0	0–1
FF Jaro	1–2	0–0	1–2	1–0		0–0	3–0	1–1	0–3	0–1	0–2	2–0	0–1	2–0
FC KooTeePee	1–2	1–3	1–2	0–2	2–1		2–2	1–2	1–0	3–0	0–3	4–2	1–1	1–0
FC Lahti	1–1	3–1	2–2	2–2	1–4	2–0		4–1	0–1	2–1	0–2	2–3	6–0	0–2
IFK Mariehamn	0–1	0–0	0–0	2–0	1–1	3–2	0–0		0–2	0–0	1–0	0–3	1–3	4–2
MyPa	0–3	0–0	1–0	1–3	2–0	1–0	1–0	0–0		3–2	4–1	0–2	0–1	1–1
AC Oulu	1–1	0–1	3–3	2–0	5–1	1–2	2–1	0–3	1–1		2–0	1–3	3–3	1–1
Tampere United	2–1	2–1	0–2	2–1	2–1	2–1	1–0	2–1	1–1	4–1		3–0	2–2	1–0
TPS	2–1	0–1	1–3	1–0	1–1	3–2	3–1	0–0	1–0	4–0	1–3		5–1	5–0
VPS	0–0	2–1	1–1	0–0	1–2	1–0	1–0	1–3	0–0	5–0	1–1	0–0		1–1
FC Viikingit	0–2	1–1	3–2	0–2	1–2	0–1	0–4	2–2	1–4	3–1	3–3	0–1	1–0	

Legend: Blue = home team win; Yellow = draw; Red = away team win.

== European results ==
Champions League:

- Tampere United prevailed in the first qualifying round against S.S. Murata of San Marino, and followed up with a victory over Levski Sofia of Bulgaria, but was knocked out by Rosenborg of Norway in the third qualifying round

UEFA Cup:

- HJK won in the first qualifying round against Etzella Ettelbruck of Luxembourg, but was knocked out by Aalborg BK of Denmark in the second qualifying round
- FC Haka won in the first qualifying round against Rhyl of Wales, but was knocked out by Midtjylland of Denmark in the second qualifying round
- MyPa won in the first qualifying round against EB/Streymur of the Faroe Islands, but was knocked out by Blackburn Rovers of England in the second qualifying round
- Tampere United joined 1st round of UEFA Cup after losing in the third qualifying round of Champions League. Bordeaux won 4–3 on aggregate.

Intertoto Cup:

- FC Honka won the first round against TVMK Tallinn of Estonia, but was knocked out by Aalborg BK of Denmark in the second round

== Top goal scorers ==
As of 13 October 2007

Position	Player	Country	Team	Goals
1	Rafael	(Brazil)	FC Lahti	13
2	Toni Lehtinen	(Finland)	FC Haka	11
3	Mikko Paatelainen	(Finland)	TPS	9
-	Berat Sadik	(Finland)	FC Lahti	9
5	Jami Puustinen	(Finland)	FC Honka	8
-	Mika Ääritalo	(Finland)	TPS	8
7	Kim Liljeqvist	(Finland)	KooTeePee	7
-	Jari Niemi	(Finland)	Tampere Utd	7
9	Jonas Emet	(Finland)	FF Jaro	6
-	Mikko Innanen	(Finland)	FC Haka	6
-	Armand One	(France)	TPS	6
-	Tomi Petrescu	(Finland)	Tampere Utd	6
-	Antti Pohja	(Finland)	Tampere Utd	6
-	Vili Savolainen	(Finland)	HJK	6
15	Jussi Aalto	(Finland)	FF Jaro	5
-	Janne Hietanen	(Finland)	AC Oulu	5
-	Toni Junnila	(Finland)	FF Jaro	5
-	Tero Taipale	(Finland)	VPS	5
-	Justus Vajanne	(Finland)	IFK Mariehamn	5

== Attendances ==
No.	Club	Average
1	TPS	5,294
2	HJK	4,848
3	Tampere	4,115
4	Honka	3,935
5	KooTeePee	2,825
6	Inter Turku	2,807
7	Oulu	2,725
8	Viikingit	2,526
9	VPS	2,351
10	Jaro	2,338
11	Lahti	2,293
12	Haka	2,024
13	Mariehamn	1,809
14	MyPa	1,769
