= FC KooTeePee =

Finnish football club

- Full name: FC Kooteepee
- Founded: 2000
- Dissolved: 2013
- Ground: Arto Tolsa Areena, Kotka
- Capacity: 4,780
Home colours	Away colours

FC KooTeePee was a Finnish football club.

FC KooTeePee was founded in 2000 as a reserve team for Kotkan Työväen Palloilijat (KTP). In December 2013, a merger took place where FC KooTeePee adopted the name FC Kotkan Työväen Palloilijat. The newly merged club was able to retain FC KooTeePee's place in the Ykkönen (the second tier of Finnish football). This event essentially saw the legacy of the older KTP club passed on to the new, merged entity.

The current club, now officially known as Kotkan Työväen Palloilijat, often referred to simply as KTP, plays in the Finnish top-tier, the Veikkausliiga.

== History ==
Originally, FC KooTeePee was founded as a reserve team of Kotkan Työväen Palloilijat (KTP, founded 1927). In the year 2000, it became an independent club. At that time, Kotkan Työväen Palloilijat was playing in Veikkausliiga; however, it was relegated to Ykkönen and finally went into bankruptcy. In the same season, KooTeePee was promoted from Kolmonen to Kakkonen, and in two years it made its way to the highest level (coached first by Pasi Rautiainen and then Ismo Lius). In 2013, their last season, the team played in Ykkönen and was coached by Sami Ristilä.

== Supporters ==
FC KooTeePee's supporters won the official "best supporters" award by the Finnish Veikkausliiga committee in 2004.
