= Tuomas Aho =

Finnish footballer (born 1981)

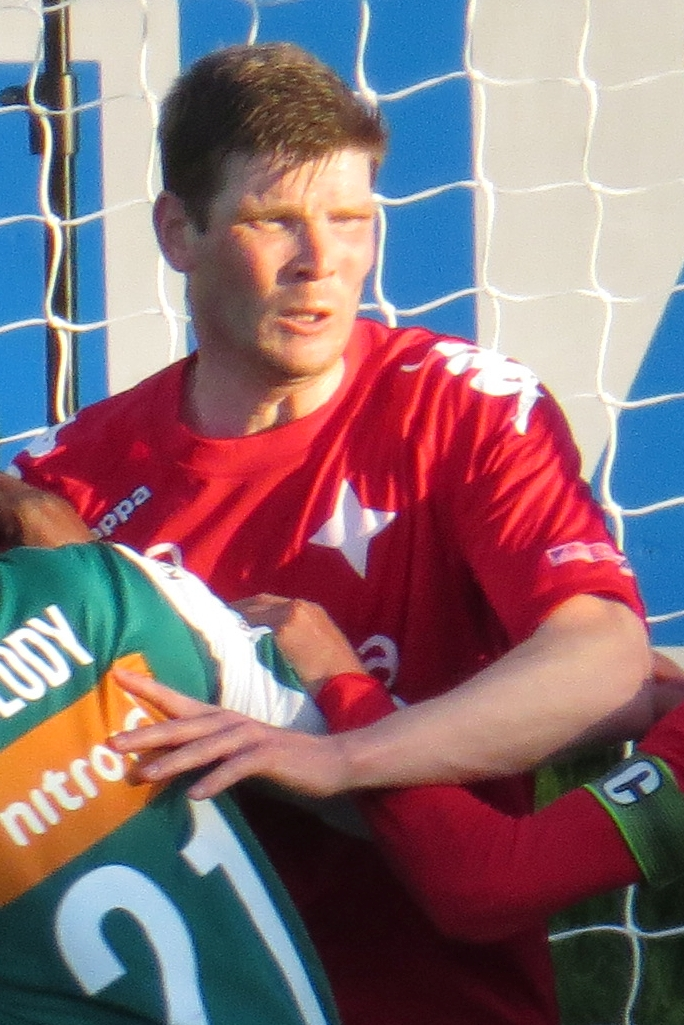
- Aho with HIFK in 2015

Personal information
- Full name: Tuomas Yrjö Aho
- Date of birth: 27 May 1981 (age 45)
- Place of birth: Parikkala, Finland
- Height: 1.88 m (6 ft 2 in)
- Position: Centre-back

Youth career
- –1992: KeuPa
- 1993–1994: Kuusankosken Kumu
- 1995: FC Kouvola
- 1996–1998: FC Kuusankoski

Senior career*
Years	Team	Apps	(Gls)
1998	Kuusankoski	5	(0)
1999–2004	MYPA	118	(3)
2002	→ Kuusankoski (loan)	1	(0)
2004–2006	AGF	18	(0)
2006–2008	HJK	59	(1)
2007	→ Klubi 04 (loan)	3	(0)
2009–2014	MyPa	142	(5)
2015–2016	HIFK	52	(2)
Total		398	(11)

International career
1999	Finland U18	8	(0)
2000	Finland U19	8	(0)
2001	Finland U20	5	(0)
2000–2003	Finland U21	12	(0)
2006	Finland B	3	(0)
- * Club domestic league appearances and goals

Tuomas Aho (born 27 May 1981) is a Finnish former professional footballer who played as a centre-back. He made 371 appearances in the Veikkausliiga, and had a short stint abroad with Danish Superliga club AGF.

== Career ==
=== Early years ===
Aho played youth football for KeuPa, Kumu JT, FC Kouvola and FC Kuusankoski. He made his senior debut for the latter in the 1998 season.

He made his debut in the Veikkausliiga on 27 June 1999 for MyPa in a match against FC Jazz. He won the Finnish Cup with the club in 2004.

=== AGF ===
On 23 December 2004, Aho signed with Danish Superliga club AGF after his contract with MyPa had expired. He made his debut on 20 March 2005, coming on as a substitute in stoppage time for Tobias Grahn in a 2–1 home win over Nordsjælland. He played his first full game on 7 May in a 3–1 away loss to AaB.

=== Return to Finland ===
Aho returned to Finland on 1 May 2006, signing with HJK. He played for the club through three seasons, before returning to MyPa on 3 December 2008. He served as club captain of both HJK and MyPa.

On 13 March 2015, Aho signed a one-year contract with HIFK, who were newly promoted to the top division.

== Personal life ==
Aho has studied sport pedagogy at the University of Jyväskylä.

== Career statistics ==
As of 1 September 2024.

Appearances and goals by club, season and competition
Club	Season	League			Cup		League cup		Europe		Total	
Club	Season	Division	Apps	Goals	Apps	Goals	Apps	Goals	Apps	Goals	Apps	Goals
Kuusankoski	1998	Kakkonen	5	0	–		–		–		5	0
MYPA	1999	Veikkausliiga	8	0	–		–		–		8	0
MYPA	2000	Veikkausliiga	30	0	–		–		1 (Note: Appearance(s) in UEFA Intertoto Cup)	0	31	0
MYPA	2001	Veikkausliiga	27	1	–		–		2 (Note: Appearances in UEFA Cup)	0	29	1
MYPA	2002	Veikkausliiga	3	0	–		–		0	0	3	0
MYPA	2003	Veikkausliiga	24	0	–		–		4	0	28	0
MYPA	2004	Veikkausliiga	26	2	1	1	–		2	0	29	3
MYPA	Total		110	3	1	1	0	0	9	0	116	4
Kuusankoski (loan)	2002	Ykkönen	1	0	–		–		–		1	0
AGF	2004–05	Danish Superliga	12	0	–		–		–		12	0
AGF	2005–06	Danish Superliga	6	0	–		–		–		6	0
AGF	Total		18	0	0	0	0	0	0	0	18	0
HJK	2006	Veikkausliiga	19	1	1	0	0	0	1	0	21	1
HJK	2007	Veikkausliiga	18	0	0	0	0	0	1	0	19	0
HJK	2008	Veikkausliiga	22	0	1	0	0	0	0	0	23	0
HJK	Total		59	1	2	0	0	0	2	0	63	1
Klubi 04	2007	Ykkönen	3	0	–		–		–		3	0
MYPA	2009	Veikkausliiga	25	0	0	0	5	0	–		30	0
MYPA	2010	Veikkausliiga	21	1	1	0	1	0	5 (Note: Appearances in UEFA Europa League)	0	28	1
MYPA	2011	Veikkausliiga	17	0	1	0	2	0	–		20	0
MYPA	2012	Veikkausliiga	25	2	2	0	2	0	3	0	32	2
MYPA	2013	Veikkausliiga	30	1	1	0	4	0	–		35	1
MYPA	2014	Veikkausliiga	24	1	0	0	5	0	4	0	33	2
MYPA	Total		142	5	5	0	19	0	12	0	178	5
HIFK	2015	Veikkausliiga	23	1	0	0	1	0	–		24	1
HIFK	2016	Veikkausliiga	20	1	1	0	5	0	–		26	1
HIFK	2017	Veikkausliiga	10	0	0	0	–		–		10	0
HIFK	Total		53	2	1	0	6	0	0	0	60	2
Career total			391	11	9	1	25	0	23	0	448	12

== Honours ==
MyPa

- Finnish Cup: 2004

HJK

- Finnish Cup: 2006, 2008
