= 2009 HJK season =

HJK
2009 season
- Chairman: Olli-Pekka Lyytikäinen
- Manager: Antti Muurinen
- Stadium: Sonera Stadium
- Veikkausliiga: 1st
- Finnish Cup: Round 7
- Finnish League Cup: Runners-up
- UEFA Europa League: Second qualifying round
- Top goalscorer: League: Dawda Bah; Juho Mäkelä (8); All: Juho Mäkelä (9)
Home colours

The 2009 season was Helsingin Jalkapalloklubi's 79th competitive season, 29th consecutive season in the Veikkausliiga, and 102nd year in existence as a football club.

The 2009 season would see HJK claim a 22nd Veikkausliiga title.

== Competitions ==
=== Veikkausliiga ===
==== Results summary ====
Overall								Home						Away					
Pld	W	D	L	GF	GA	GD	Pts	W	D	L	GF	GA	GD	W	D	L	GF	GA	GD
26	14	10	2	45	21	+24	52	8	5	0	26	9	+17	6	5	2	19	12	+7

Last updated: 17 October 2009.
Source: See Results

==== Results by round ====
Round	1	2	3	4	5	6	7	8	9	10	11	12	13	14	15	16	17	18	19	20	21	22	23	24	25	26
Ground	H	H	A	H	A	H	A	H	H	A	H	A	A	A	A	H	A	A	H	A	H	H	A	H	A	H
Result	W	D	W	W	L	D	D	W	W	L	W	W	W	W	D	D	D	D	D	W	W	W	W	W	D	D

Source: see below
A = Away; H = Home; W = Win; D = Draw; L = Loss

==== Results ====
18 April 2009 1	HJK	5 – 1	KuPS	Helsinki
14:00	Kärkkäinen 23'; Popovitch 44', 65'; Parikka 54'; Mäkelä 82'		Venäläinen 17'	Stadium: Finnair Stadium; Attendance: 3,150

23 April 2009 2	HJK	2 – 2	TPS	Helsinki
16:30	Bah 14'; Medo 73'		Nyberg 57'; Paatelainen 66'	Stadium: Finnair Stadium; Attendance: 3,527

29 April 2009 3	Haka	1 – 2	HJK	Valkeakoski
16:30	Holopainen 33'		Popovitch 23'; Sorsa 48'	Stadium: Tehtaan kenttä Attendance: 3,231

6 May 2009 4	HJK	2 – 0	IFK Mariehamn	Helsinki
16:30	Mäkelä 25', 44'			Stadium: Finnair Stadium; Attendance: 2,550

11 May 2009 5	MYPA	1 – 0	HJK	Kouvola
17:00	Ricketts 53'			Stadium: Saviniemi; Attendance: 1,150

14 May 2009 6	HJK	1 – 1	Honka	Helsinki
16:30	Bah 55'		Turunen 90'	Stadium: Finnair Stadium; Attendance: 4,527

17 May 2009 7	JJK	1 – 1	HJK	Jyväskylä
16:30	Nam 17'		Medo 10'	Stadium: Harjun Stadion; Attendance: 4,022

25 May 2009 8	HJK	1 – 0	Lahti	Helsinki
17:00	Kärkkäinen 59'			Stadium: Finnair Stadium; Attendance: 3,152

28 May 2009 9	HJK	1 – 0	Tampere United	Helsinki
17:00	Sorsa 28'			Stadium: Finnair Stadium; Attendance: 3,769

31 May 2009 10	RoPS	1 – 0	HJK	Rovaniemi
16:30	Pires 15'			Stadium: Keskuskenttä; Attendance: 1,825

28 June 2009 11	HJK	2 – 0	Inter Turku	Helsinki
16:30	Mäkelä 14'; Parikka 90'			Stadium: Töölön Pallokenttä; Attendance: 3,510

1 July 2009 12	VPS	3 – 4	HJK	Vaasa
16:30	Inutile 17', 20'; Lyyski 49'		Sorsa 26'; Fowler 55'; Pelvas 59', 69'	Stadium: Hietalahti; Attendance: 4,247

5 July 2009 13	FF Jaro	0 – 2	HJK	Jakobstad
16:30			Parikka 4'; Mannström 55' (o.g.)	Stadium: Jakobstads Centralplan; Attendance: 3,378

12 July 2009 14	KuPS	0 – 3	HJK	Kuopio
16:30			Pelvas 28'; Sorsa 59'; Bah 64'	Stadium: Magnum Areena; Attendance: 3,511

19 July 2009 15	TPS	1 – 1	HJK	Turku
16:30	Ääritalo 86'		Cleaver 45' (o.g.)	Stadium: Veritas Stadion; Attendance: 7,319

26 July 2009 16	HJK	3 – 3	Haka	Helsinki
16:30	Bah 12', 38'; Pelvas 87'		Strandvall 6', 72'; Mattila 68'	Stadium: Finnair Stadium; Attendance: 4,050

2 August 2009 17	IFK Mariehamn	0 – 0	HJK	Mariehamn
16:30				Stadium: Wiklöf Holding Arena; Attendance: 2,153

9 August 2009 18	Honka	1 – 1	HJK	Espoo
16:30	Savage 46'		Medo 19'	Stadium: Tapiolan Urheilupuisto; Attendance: 4,521

16 August 2009 19	HJK	1 – 1	JJK	Helsinki
16:30	Riihilahti 59'		Nam 33'	Stadium: Töölön Pallokenttä; Attendance: 1,710

23 August 2009 20	Lahti	1 – 2	HJK	Lahti
13:00	Fofana 28'		Toivomäki 28' (o.g.); Pelvas 51'	Stadium: Lahden Stadion; Attendance: 3,168

13 September 2009 21	HJK	4 – 0	RoPS	Helsinki
16:30				Stadium: Finnair Stadium

20 September 2009 22	HJK	2 – 0	VPS	Helsinki
16:30	Bah 40'; Mäkelä 62'			Stadium: Finnair Stadium; Attendance: 6,227

23 September 2009 23	Tampere United	1 – 2	HJK	Tampere
16:30	Petrescu 46'		Sorsa 21'; Riihilahti 56'	Stadium: Ratina Stadion; Attendance: 2,892

27 September 2009 24	HJK	1 – 0	MYPA	Helsinki
15:00	Mäkelä 10'			Stadium: Finnair Stadium; Attendance: 3,240

4 October 2009 25	Inter Turku	1 – 1	HJK	Turku
15:00	Kauko 6'		Bah 35'	Stadium: Veritas Stadion; Attendance: 2,488

17 October 2009 26	HJK	1 – 1	FF Jaro	Helsinki
13:00				Stadium: Finnair Stadium

==== League table ====
Pos	Team	Pld	W	D	L	GF	GA	GD	Pts	Qualification or relegation
1	HJK (C)	26	14	10	2	45	21	+24	52	Qualification to Champions League second qualifying round
2	FC Honka	26	13	10	3	65	29	+36	49	Qualification to Europa League second qualifying round
3	TPS	26	13	10	3	46	20	+26	49	Qualification to Europa League first qualifying round
4	IFK Mariehamn	26	10	13	3	30	21	+9	43	
5	FC Inter	26	11	7	8	38	30	+8	40	Qualification to Europa League third qualifying round (Note: Inter Turku qualified for the third qualifying round of the UEFA Europa League by winning the 2009 Finnish Cup.)

Source: veikkausliiga.com (in Finnish)
Rules for classification: 1) points; 2) goal difference; 3) number of goals scored.
(C) Champions

=== Finnish Cup ===
8 July 2009 Round 6	FC Espoo	0 – 1	HJK	Espoo
16:30			Mäkelä 51'	Stadium: Leppävaaran Stadion

30 August 2009 Round 7	KuPS	1 – 0	HJK	Kuopio
16:30	Koljonen 15'			Stadium: Magnum Areena

=== League Cup ===
==== Group 2 ====
Pos	Team	Pld	W	D	L	GF	GA	GD	Pts	HJK	HON	VPS	JAR	MYP	HAK	KPS
1	HJK	6	6	0	0	14	3	+11	18		3–0		1–0	2–1		
2	FC Honka	6	5	0	1	15	4	+11	15				2–0		1–0	7–0
3	VPS	6	3	0	3	8	8	0	9	1–2	1–4			1–0		
4	FF Jaro	6	2	1	3	9	7	+2	7			0–2			1–1	3–1
5	MYPA	6	2	0	4	7	12	−5	6		0–1		0–5			3–1
6	Haka	6	1	1	4	6	9	−3	4	0–2		2–0		2–3		
7	KuPS	6	1	0	5	5	21	−16	3	1–4		0–3			2–1	

Source: rsssf.com
Rules for classification: 1) points; 2) goal difference; 3) number of goals scored.

23 January 2009 1	HJK	2 – 1	MYPA	Helsinki
15:00	Pelvas 60'; Parikka 62'		Rantanen 71'	Stadium: Finnair Stadium

7 February 2009 2	HJK	1 – 0	FF Jaro	Helsinki
16:00	Sorsa 36'			Stadium: Finnair Stadium

13 February 2009 3	VPS	1 – 2	HJK	Vaasa
16:00	Forsell 37'		Parikka 2'; Medo 6'	Stadium: Hietalahti

21 February 2009 4	Haka	0 – 2	HJK	Valkeakoski
12:15			Pelvas 60'; Sorsa 68'	Stadium: Tehtaan kenttä

27 February 2009 5	HJK	3 – 0	Honka	Helsinki
19:30				Stadium: Finnair Stadium

2 March 2009 6	KuPS	1 – 4	HJK	Kuopio
16:30				Stadium: Magnum Areena

==== Knockout stages ====
21 March 2009 Quarterfinal	HJK	2 – 2 (5 – 3 p)	Lahti	Helsinki
14:00				Stadium: Finnair Stadium

4 April 2009 Semifinal	HJK	3 – 1	IFK Mariehamn	Helsinki
16:00				Stadium: Finnair Stadium

15 April 2009 Final	Tampere United	2 – 0	HJK	Vantaa
19:00				Stadium: Myyrmäen jalkapallostadion

=== UEFA Europa League ===
==== Qualifying phase ====
16 July 2009 2nd qualifying round 1st leg	FK Vėtra (Lithuania)	0 – 1	(Finland) HJK	Vilnius, Lithuania
19:00 EEST (UTC+3)		Report	Bah 15'	Stadium: Vėtra Stadium; Attendance: 1,200; Referee: Vladimir Vnuk (Slovakia)

23 July 2009 2nd qualifying round 2nd leg	HJK (Finland)	1 – 3 (2 – 3 agg.)	(Lithuania) FK Vėtra	Helsinki, Finland
18:00 EEST (UTC+3)	Kamara 3'	Report	Grigalevičius 27'; Jankauskas 30'; Moroz 81'	Stadium: Finnair Stadium; Referee: Marcin Borski (Poland)
