= Noam Surrier =

French footballer (born 1981)

Personal information
- Date of birth: 6 August 1981 (age 45)
- Place of birth: France
- Position: Forward

Youth career
- AJ Auxerre

Senior career*
Years	Team	Apps	(Gls)
2001–2002	Stade Briochin		
2002–2003	FC Aurillac		
2003–2004	Montauban FCTG		
2004	Paris FC		
2004	FC Lahti	3	(1)
2004	FC Kuusankoski		
2005	Kokkolan Palloveikot		
2005–20xx	FC Bassin d'Arcachon		
2006	FC Hämeenlinna		
2007–2008	JK Warkaus		
- * Club domestic league appearances and goals

Noam Surrier (born 6 August 1981) is a French retired footballer who is last known to have played for JK Warkaus from 2007 to 2008 and have played for FC Lahti under Veikkausliiga Finish football league.

== Finland ==
Exiting Paris to come to terms with a Finnish club mid-spring 2004, Surrier ended up with Lahti, breaking his thigh at the League Cup and missing the opener of the 2004 Veikkausliiga to recuperate. Returning for the league meeting away in Inter, the Frenchman went home to France that June.
