= 2003 Kakkonen – Finnish League Division 2 =

Finnish League Division 2
- Season: 2003
- Champions: PK-35; Kings Kuopio; P-Iirot; PS Kemi
- Promoted: MP; IFK Mariehamn; P-Iirot
- Relegated: 8 teams

League tables for teams participating in Kakkonen, the third tier of the Finnish Soccer League system, in 2003.

== League tables 2003 ==
=== Southern Group, Etelälohko ===
Pos	Team	Pld	W	D	L	GF	GA	GD	Pts
1	PK-35, Helsinki	22	12	7	3	38	21	+17	43
2	IFK Mariehamn, Mariehamn	22	11	5	6	37	25	+12	38
3	Atlantis FC, Helsinki	22	11	4	7	28	24	+4	37
4	FC Espoo, Espoo	22	10	5	7	42	36	+6	35
5	FCK Salamat, Kirkkonummi	22	9	6	7	45	32	+13	33
6	KäPa, Helsinki	22	9	5	8	36	29	+7	32
7	IF Gnistan, Helsinki	22	7	11	4	34	31	+3	32
8	FC Kontu, Helsinki	22	8	7	7	34	36	−2	31
9	HyPS, Hyvinkää	22	5	6	11	30	37	−7	21
10	Kiffen, Helsinki	22	4	9	9	18	37	−19	21
11	AC Vantaa, Vantaa	22	5	4	13	19	33	−14	19
12	FC Futura, Porvoo	22	4	5	13	28	48	−20	17

=== Eastern Group, Itälohko ===
Pos	Team	Pld	W	D	L	GF	GA	GD	Pts
1	Kings, Kuopio	22	19	1	2	69	13	+56	58
2	MP, Mikkeli	22	17	3	2	61	9	+52	54
3	Warkaus JK, Varkaus	22	16	2	4	61	18	+43	50
4	JJK, Jyväskylä	22	15	1	6	56	19	+37	46
5	Pantterit, Joutseno	22	11	3	8	45	30	+15	36
6	SäyRi, Jyväskylä	22	11	1	10	51	29	+22	34
7	PK-37, Iisalmi	22	7	5	10	35	44	−9	26
8	KajHa, Kajaani	22	7	3	12	25	36	−11	24
9	Jippo, Joensuu	22	5	7	10	31	44	−13	22
10	FCV, Jyväskylän maalaiskunta	22	3	4	15	26	74	−48	13
11	TP Lahti, Lahti	22	2	3	17	23	85	−62	9
12	KuFu-98, Kuopio	22	2	1	19	14	96	−82	7

=== Western Group, Länsilohko ===
Pos	Team	Pld	W	D	L	GF	GA	GD	Pts
1	P-Iirot, Rauma	22	15	5	2	40	10	+30	50
2	TPV, Tampere	22	16	2	4	48	20	+28	50
3	EIF, Ekenäs	22	13	6	3	44	24	+20	45
4	SalPa, Salo	22	9	5	8	29	33	−4	32
5	PIF, Pargas	22	7	7	8	29	32	−3	28
6	FJK, Forssa	22	8	3	11	36	40	−4	27
7	MuSa, Pori	22	7	5	10	34	38	−4	26
8	KaaPo, Kaarina	22	6	6	10	28	35	−7	24
9	FC Rauma, Rauma	22	6	6	10	34	43	−9	24
10	MaPS, Masku	22	5	6	11	22	39	−17	21
11	PS-44, Valkeakoski	22	4	7	11	29	41	−12	19
12	PoPa, Pori	22	4	6	12	28	46	−18	18

=== Northern Group, Pohjoislohko ===
Pos	Team	Pld	W	D	L	GF	GA	GD	Pts
1	PS Kemi, Kemi	20	14	5	1	52	19	+33	47
2	TUS, Kronoby	20	9	4	7	44	34	+10	31
3	VIFK, Vaasa	20	9	3	8	34	42	−8	30
4	KPV-j, Kokkola	20	8	5	7	38	36	+2	29
5	TP-Seinäjoki, Seinäjoki	20	7	7	6	49	42	+7	28
6	JBK, Jakobstad	20	8	4	8	44	46	−2	28
7	FC Kiisto, Vaasa	20	7	6	7	36	38	−2	27
8	Tervarit, Oulu	20	7	4	9	46	43	+3	25
9	FC YPA, Ylivieska	20	7	4	9	39	45	−6	25
10	KaIK, Kaskinen	20	7	2	11	47	58	−11	23
11	Öja-73, Kokkola	20	2	6	12	25	51	−26	12

=== Promotion Playoff ===
Round 1

- IFK Mariehamn – Kings 4–2
- Kings – IFK Mariehamn 2–1

IFK Mariehamn won 5–4 on aggregate

- MP – PK-35 0–0
- PK-35 – MP 1–1

MP won on away goals

- TPV – PS Kemi 1–4
- PS Kemi – TPV 2–1

PS Kemi won 6–2 on aggregate

- TUS – P-Iirot 0–1
- P-Iirot – TUS 2–1

P-Iirot won 3–1 on aggregate

Round 2

- IFK Mariehamn – PS Kemi 2–0
- PS Kemi – IFK Mariehamn 3–1 (2–0)

IFK Mariehamn won on away goals and were promoted to Division 1

- MP – P-Iirot 3–1
- P-Iirot – MP 2–1

MP won 4–3 on aggregate and were promoted to Division 1

=== Division One/Division Two Playoff ===
- P-Iirot – GBK Kokkola 3–0
- GBK – P-Iirot 1–1

P-Iirot won 4–1 on aggregate and were promoted to Division 1. GBK were relegated to Division 2

- PS Kemi – FC Kuusankoski 2–3
- FC Kuusankoski – PS Kemi 2–0

FC Kuusankoski won 5–2 on aggregate and remain in Division 1. PS Kemi remain in Division 2

=== Relegation playoff ===
- PMP EJ – Kiffen 0–3
- Kiffen – PMP EJ 5–1

Kiffen won 8–1 on aggregate and remain in Division 2.

- Huima – FCV 4–2
- FCV – Huima 0–1

Huima won 5–2 on aggregate and were promoted to Division 2.

- ÅIFK – MaPS 2–1
- MaPS – ÅIFK 2–0

MaPS won 3–2 on aggregate and remain in Division 2.

- NFF – KaIK 0–3

NFF withdrew and KaIK remain in Division 2.

== References and sources ==
- Finnish FA, Suomen Palloliitto
