= 2008 Finnish Cup =

2008 Suomen Cup
Tournament details
- Country: Finland
- Teams: 361

Final positions
- Champions: HJK Helsinki
- Runners-up: FC Honka

2008 Finnish Cup (Finnish: Suomen Cup) was the 54th season of the main annual football competition in Finland. It was organized as a single-elimination knock–out tournament.

Participation in the competition is voluntary. Veikkausliiga side IFK Mariehamn, for example, decided not to register for the tournament, as well as some Ykkönen teams.

Depending on their position within the league system, teams entered in different rounds. Clubs with teams in Kolmonen or an inferior league, as well as Veterans and Junior teams, started the competition in the First Round. Teams from the first three levels of the Finnish league pyramid entered in the Fourth Round, with the exception of Veikkausliiga clubs Tampere United, FC Haka, FC Honka and TPS. These four teams entered in the Sixth Round because they have qualified for European competitions after the 2007 season.

The tournament started on 1 April 2008 with the First Round and concluded with the Final held on 1 November 2008 at Finnair Stadium, Helsinki.

== Participating teams ==
Veikkausliiga – 13 teams	Ykkönen (I) – 10 teams	Kakkonen (II) – 28 teams
Haka, HJK Helsinki, Honka, Inter Turku, Jaro, KooTeePee, KuPS, Lahti, MyPa, RoPS, Tampere United, TPS, VPS	AC Oulu, Atlantis FC, FC Viikingit, JIPPO, JJK, KPV, PK-35, PS Kemi, TPV, TP-47	FC Espoo, FC Kuusankoski, City Stars / FC Kuusysi, FC OPA, FC YPA, FJK, GBK, Gnistan, HIFK, Huima, HyPS, Ilves, JBK, KTP, LoPa, Norrvalla FF, Pallo-Iirot, PK Keski-Uusimaa, PK-37, PP-70, Rakuunat, SalPa, Sinimustat, SJK, TUS, VPS–j, Warkaus JK, ÅIFK
Kolmonen (III) – 92 teams
AC Kajaani, AC Vantaa, BET, EBK, EsPa, EuPa, FC Boda, FC Degis, FC Espoo Reserves, FC Futura, FC HIK, FC Honka Reserves, FC K–Jazz, FC Jazz –j, FC KOMU, FC Korsholm, FC POHU, FC Rauma, FC Santa, FC Tampere, FC Vapsi, FC Viikingit Reserves, FC Villisiat, FC YPA Reserves, FCV, GBK Reserves, Gnistan Ogeli, HaPK, HauPa, Härmä, IK, IK Myran, JIlves, JIPPO Reserves, JoPS, JPS, JyTy, JäPS, KaaPo Reserves, Karhu, Kasiysi PMP, KeuPa, KP–V, Loiske, LTU, MaKu, MPS, MPS Reserves, MuSa, NIK, NoPS, NoPy, NuPa, NuPS, OPedot, OuTa, PaRi, Pato, PEPO, PIF, Pallo–Iirot Reserves, PJK, PK–35 Reserves, Ponnistus, PPV, Purha, Pöxyt, RIlves, Reima, RuoVi, SalReipas, SAPA, SavU, SC KuFu –98, SC Riverball, S.C. Zulimanit, SiU, SoVo, Stars, STPS, Sudet, Tervarit, ToiP –49, ToVe, TPK, TP–47 Reserves, VaKP, Vilpas, Virkiä, VJS, VäVi, Öja
Lower leagues (IV – VII) – 186 teams
AC StaSi, AFC EMU, AFC Keltik, APV, BET Reserves, Black Islanders, Boca Seniors, Boca Seniors Reserves, Colo Colo, Colo Colo Reserves, EKP, Esse IK Reserves, EuPa Reserves, FC Bosna, FC Folk, FC G.A.B, FC HaNa, FC HaPo, FC HEIV, FC IKHTYS, FC K–Jazz Reserves, FC Kontu Reserves, FC Korsholm Reserves, FC KyPS, FC Lepakot, FC Lohja, FC Loviisa, FC Nets, FC OPA Reserves, FC Pakila, FC PaSa, FC POHU Reserves, FC POHU 3, FC POHU 4, FC POHU 5, FC Raahe, FC Rai, FC Rai Reserves, FC Sääripotku, FC TaFu, FC Tarmo, FC Teivo, FC Tribe, FC Trompi, FC Turku–82, FC Vehmaa, FC Västnyland, F.C.B., FCD, FCUK, FF Kickers, FoBK, Gnistan Reserves, HaTP, HDS, HeKuLa, HeMan, HIFK Reserves, HJK–j, HooGee, HPS, HST, Hurtat, I–Kissat, IVFC, JoPS Reserves, JPS Reserves, Juhlahevoset, JuPS, Jurva–70, JVU, JäPS Reserves, KaaPS, KaaRe, KaIK, Karjalohjan Biisonit, Kasiysi, Kasiysi Rocky, KaVo, KemPa, KePo, Kiksi, KJV, KoiPS, KoKiri, Kotajärven Pallo, KOPSE, KoRe, KPonsi, KPR, Kristallipalatsi, KTP Reserves, Kuivaniemen Isku, Kungliga Wasa, Kurvin Vauhti, KuRy, Lauttapallo, LaVe, LeJy, LeKi, LePa, Lieto, Lieto Reserves, LoPS, Littoisten Palloseura, Luja, LuVe, MasKi, MPR, MPS 3, MunU, MyMy, MäJä, Nagu IF, NaKa, Naseva, Nasta, NePa, NJS, Nopsa, NouLa, Oldschool, Orient United, OuHu, OuRe, PaiHa, PaPe, ParVi, Pathoven, Peltirumpu, PEPO Reserves, PaKa, PH–99, PiPo–79, PiPS, PJK Reserves, Ponnistajat, PoPo, PPJ, PPV Reserves, PP–70 Reserves, RaiTeePee, Rakuunat J, RiPa, RiRa, RiRa Reserves, RP–67, RT–88, SC Riverball Reserves, SaTo, SibboV, SibboV Reserves, Sisu, Souls AC, SUMU, SUMU Lyon, SuPa, TaaJä, TahVe, TaPo, TC, TeTe, TiPS, TKT, ToPS–90, ToTe AP, ToU, TPK Reserves, TPV Reserves, TuPS, TuPV, VKajo, VaKP Reserves, Vesa, ViiPV, VJK, YIlves, Yllätys, YlöR, YPallo, Zenith
Veterans (35 years or older) – 9 teams	Junior teams (19 years or younger) – 23 teams	
FC Kiffen Veterans, FC Lohja Veterans, FC Repaleet, I–HK Veterans, KTP Veterans, MPS Veterans, NP–H / Pappazulut Veterans, Riverball Veterans, WIFK Veterans	FC Honka Juniors, FC Honka Juniors Reserves, FC POHU Juniors, FC POHU Juniors Reserves, FC Reipas Juniors, FC Reipas Juniors Reserves, FC Vapsi Juniors, Gnistan Juniors, Gnistan Juniors Reserves, Ilves Juniors, JäPS Juniors, Kasiysi Juniors, KPS Juniors, KäPa Juniors, LoPa Juniors, MyPa Juniors, PPJ Juniors, PS Kemi Juniors, SiPS Juniors, TKT Juniors, TPV Juniors, VJS Juniors, ÅIFK Juniors	

== First round ==
The draw for this round was conducted on 11 March 2008. Exactly one hundred teams were drawn into fifty matches for this round, with the remaining teams receiving a bye. Matches were played on April 1 – 10, 2008.

Home team	Score	Away team
FC Västnyland	2–7	Biisonit
Black Islanders	0–5	KaIK
Gnistan Ogeli	0–3	Ponnistus
FC Vehmaa	0–12	LTU
FC Jazz–j	1–2	P–Iirot Reserves
FC Pakila	1–0	Colo Colo Reserves
FC Kiffen Veterans	5–0	Boca Seniors
Ellas	1–3	FC POHU Juniors
RiPa	5–3	Peltirumpu
RiRa Reserves	0–5	EsPa
TaPo	2–1	Kasiysi Juniors
Colo Colo	4–3	MPS Veterans
Härmä	0–4	ToiP–49
NJS	7–3	KoiPS
PaKa	1–6	Tervarit
MyMy	1–7	Pöxyt
HPS	2–5 (aet)	Gnistan Juniors
Orient United	0–1	FC Honka Juniors Reserves
ViiPV	3–2 (aet)	Oldschool
TaaJä	1–5	ÅIFK Juniors
FC Loviisa	1–4	SavU
KTP Reserves	6–2 (aet)	KePo
TiPS	4–2	Naseva
FC RAI Reserves	2–1	IVFC
FC PASA	0–3	HaPK
Kasiysi Reserves	0–6	FC Honka Reserves

Home team	Score	Away team
FC Trompi	1–8	FC VAPSI Juniors
TPV Reserves	3–1	FC VAPSI
RT–88	1–4	SibboV Reserves
KoKiri	8–5	KPonsi
MyPa Juniors	2–4	Purha
HooGee 3	3–1	AFC EMU
PP–70 Reserves	3–1	YPallo
LePa	0–11	JäPS
FCD	0–1 (aet)	FC Honka Juniors
HaTP	0–3	Rakuunat J
IFK Jakobstad	4–0	FoBK
VJS Juniors	2–7	SalReipas
I–HK Veterans	1–6	RIlves
KaaPo Reserves	1–1 (aet)	SoVo
KaaPo Reserves won 6–5 on penalties
PPJ	1–3	HDS
HeMan	0–13	HIFK Reserves
KaVo	1–4	Pato
LauttaPallo	2–3	PPJ Juniors
FC Kontu Reserves	16–0	FC POHU 5
SUMU/2	0–4	FC Viikingit/2
RiRa	1–0	Pathoven
FC POHU Reserves	5–2	PH–99
TKT Juniors	4–2	VaKP
FC HaNa	0–7	Stars

== Second round ==
The draw for this round was conducted on 11 March 2008. The winners of the First Round, along with the teams who received a bye, were drawn into 130 matches for this round. Matches were played between April 2 – 25, 2008.

Home team	Score	Away team
FC Turku–82	6–4 (aet)	LPS
FC Sääripotku	4–2 (aet)	FF Kickers
TPK Reserves	8–1	TC
FC Boda	0–2	TPK
MasKi	1–10	AC Vantaa
VaKP Reserves	0–6	TPV Juniors
FC OPA Reserves	0–5	OuTa
VJS	0–1	FC Reipas Juniors
ParVi	1–1 (aet)	Kristallipalatsi
ParVi won 5–4 on penalties
EuPa Reserves	0–5	MuSa
GBK Reserves	0–1	Reima
FC POHU 3	1–2	Vesa
PoPo	2–3	PEPO
Zenith	1–5	PK–35 Reserves
PaiHa	1–4	Nagu IF
Nasta	1–3	P–Iirot Reserves
LTU	5–1	PiPS
FC Lohja Veterans	0–12	SibboV
JäPS Reserves	6–2	F.C.B.
KPS Juniors	1–3	IK Myran
FC Honka Juniors Reserves	1–3	NuPS
LeJy	1–5	Karhu
UrPS	0–1	FC TaFu
SuPa	2–0	JoPS Reserves
Nopsa	1–2	JäPS Juniors
KOPSE	1–2 (aet)	NJS
JPS	5–3	PaRi
HeKuLa	2–3	SAPA
JPS Reserves	0–5	KeuPa
Ponnistus	2–1	MaKu
PEPO Reserves	4–0	RiPa
Lieto	1–0 (aet)	Vilpas
OuRe	2–2 (aet)	KemPa
OuRe won 6–5 on penalties
FC Repaleet Veterans	2–1	Rakuunat J
FC Lohja	1–3 (aet)	OPedot
Öja	2–1	NIK
PP–70 Reserves	6–0	TahVe
KoKiRi	1–5	NaKa
Lieto Reserves	1–1 (aet)	KaaPS
KaaPS won 3–1 on penalties
ToPS–90	1–5	MPR
FC RAI Reserves	1–3	PS Kemi Juniors
FCUK	4–2	AFC Keltik
FC Bosna	5–4	RaiTeePee
PIF	4–2	ÅIFK Juniors
YIlves	11–0	PiPo–79
LaVe	1–3	Loiske
HIFK Reserves	2–0	Kurvin Vauhti
FC POHU	5–0	PPJ Juniors
FC Pakila	1–0 (aet)	FC POHU 4
RiRa	2–2 (aet)	FC Honka Juniors
RiRa won 5–4 on penalties
RP–67	0–3	JyTy
Pöxyt	0–9	FC Futura
FC Honka Reserves	16–1	Kiksi
FC GAB	1–6	Stars
JIPPO Reserves	1–2	SC Riverball
FC Kontu Reserves	0–3	MPS
FC Raahe	1–0	PaTe
KoRe	1–0	FC Villisiat
FC HIK	0–2	FC Espoo Reserves
JäPS	11–0	SibboV Reserves
PPV Reserves	1–2	FC Viikingit Reserves
AC StaSi	2–1	KäPa Juniors
FC Kasiysi 3	0–9	RIlves

Home team	Score	Away team
YlöR	0–9	NoPS
HooGee	0–13	SalReipas
WIFK Veterans	1–5	KoPa
FC POHU Reserves	0–3	PPV
FC POHU Juniors	3–2	FC HeIV
KTP Reserves	0–6	Purha
Juhlahevoset	3–1	Gnistan Juniors Reserves
ToTe Avauspotku	3–2	KPR
FC IKHTYS	0–3	FC Boca
LuVe	1–4	EuPa
NouLa	3–1	FC Reipas Juniors Reserves
TiPS	2–1	EsPa
FC Korsholm Reserves	3–2	Luja
TKT	1–4	PJK
HDS	4–0	Ponnistajat
TuPS	0–4	EBK
MunU	1–5	KP–V
TaPo	2–6	LoPa Juniors
FC Rai	0–6	HauPa
FC Teivo	2–5	ToiP–49
FC KyPS	0–1	KaaRe
FC Nets	2–1	Kuivaniemen Isku
JuPS	1–3	SC Riverball Reserves
PaPe	5–0	SiU
NP–H/Pappazulut Veterans	1–0	JoPS
JIlves	0–2	FCV
VKajo	1–7	SavU
KuRy	1–0 (aet)	Jurva–70
Jäntevä	0–8	Sudet
ViiPV	7–1	HST
Esse IK Reserves	2–1 (aet)	LoVe
Yllätys	0–1	SiPS Juniors
FC Tarmo	0–3	FC Santa Claus
APV	1–6	FC Korsholm
FC Tribe	0–8	Pato
SUMU	2–1	MPS 3
KaIK	1–3	Kungliga Wasa
Biisonit	3–4	Kasiysi PMP
IK	1–4	Virkiä
ToU	1–6	SC KuFu–98
KJV	1–2	FC KOMU
FC HaPo	0–2	RuoVi
FC Lepakot	0–6	AC Kajaani
EKP	0–5	HaPK
NePa	4–2 (aet)	NoPy
BET Reserves	0–4	FC K–Jazz
TPV Reserves	0–2	Ilves Juniors
LeKi	2–1	TKT Juniors
FC Degis	0–1	MPS Reserves
Tervarit	0–1	TP–47 Reserves
Hurtat	w/o	RautU
FC VAPSI Juniors	0–4	FC Tigers
PJK Reserves	0–2	I–Kissat
KTP Veterans	1–0	STPS
NuPa	w/o	VäVi
Riverball Veterans	1–6	S.C. Zulimanit
FC Kiffen Veterans	2–1	IF Gnistan Juniors
Colo Colo	2–3	HJK–j
TuPV	1–0	KaaPo Reserves
TeTe	1–4 (aet)	Sisu
IFK Jakobstad	8–0	OuHu
SaTo	4–2	LoPS
Souls AC	7–1	FC K–Jazz Reserves
Gnistan Reserves	2–1 (aet)	HooGee 3
FC Rauma	2–4	ToVe
VJK	4–11	BET
FC Folk	1–4	FC YPA Reserves

== Third round ==
The draw for this round was conducted on 11 April 2008. The winners of the previous round participated in this round. Matches were played on April 19 – May 6, 2008.

Home team	Score	Away team
SibboV	1–2 (aet)	MPS
KeuPa	1–5	JPS
TPV Juniors	2–1 (aet)	Pato
Vesa	0–6	FC Honka Reserves
ParVi	2–3	YIlves
POHU Juniors	1–4	SalReipas
FC Sääripotku	0–4	TP–47 Reserves
Gnistan Reserves	0–1	Kasiysi PMP
NuPS	2–4	SavU
OuRe	0–3	HauPa
KaaPS	1–8	NoPS
FC POHU	1–0 (aet)	HaPK
SAPA	1–0	Sudet
JäPS Reserves	1–4	FC Espoo Reserves
Juhlahevoset	2–3	OPedot
ToTe Avauspotku	0–1 (aet)	JäPS Juniors
PaPe	1–6	PEPO
KuRy	0–9	Öja
Nagu IF	0–1	ViiPV
KP–V	0–4	FC Santa Claus
AC Kajaani	6–1	Virkiä
FCUK	0–3	FCV
FC Turku–82	2–1	FC TaFu
Esse IK Reserves	4–1	Sisu
SUMU	1–0	PK–35 Reserves
JäPS	8–1	HIFK Reserves
IFK Jakobstad	4–0	Reima
EBK	5–1	MPS Reserves
NouLa	0–2	NJS
Ilves Juniors	0–1	ToiP–49
AC Vantaa	3–0	FC Futura
FC Kiffen Veterans	w/o	FC Reipas Juniors
NP–H/Pappazulut Veterans	1–4	BET
FC Boca	2–3	HDS

Home team	Score	Away team
FC Komu	2–1 (aet)	Kungliga Wasa
IK Myran	2–1	NuPa
MPR	2–0	SC Riverball Reserves
KoRe	1–1 (aet)	FC Viikingit Reserves
Viikingit Reserves won 5–4 on penalties
FC YPA Reserves	0–1	OuTa
FC Bosna	0–2	TPK
Loiske	0–4	RuoVi
SuPa	0–3	S.C. Zulimanit
FC Tigers	3–1	LTU
KTP Veterans	6–2	HJK–j
FC Korsholm Reserves	0–3	Karhu
Hurtat	0–11	SC KuFu–98
FC Repaleet Veterans	0–8	PPV
FC Pakila	0–3	RiRa
FC Raahe	0–7	FC Nets
SC Riverball	6–1	FC K–jazz
TuPV	2–1	ToVe
NaKa	0–8 (aet)	Ponnistus
PEPO Reserves	3–1 (aet)	AC StaSi
KoPa	2–1	RIlves
Lieto	4–1	PIF
PP–70 Reserves	2–0	P–Iirot Reserves
NePa	1–2	EuPa
FC Korsholm	7–2 (aet)	PS Kemi Juniors
TiPS	2–1	Stars
SaTo	1–4 (aet)	LeKi
KaaRe	0–3	JyTy
I–Kissat	1–1	MuSa
I–Kissat won 4–3 on penalties
LoPa Juniors	0–1	Purha
Souls AC	0–2	SiPS Juniors
TPK Reserves	1–2 (aet)	PJK

== Fourth round ==
The draw for this round was conducted on 23 April 2008. The 65 winners of the Third Round, along with the 47 teams from the top three tiers which entered in this round, were drawn into 56 matches for this round. Matches were played on May 6 – 30, 2008.

Home team	Score	Away team
OuTa	0–6	AC Oulu
JäPS Juniors	1–12	FC Viikingit
AC Kajaani	1–2	PS Kemi
OPedot	0–1	FC Kuusankoski
BET	0–3	Warkaus JK
MPS	1–3	HIFK
ViiPV	0–2 (aet)	ToiP–49
SAPA	0–0 (aet)	Gnistan
Gnistan won 5–4 on penalties
FC Komu	0–1	FC YPA
JyTy	0–3	Ilves
SavU	0–1	Atlantis FC
MPR	0–8	JIPPO
NoPS	1–2	TPV
EuPa	2–3	ÅIFK
FC Viikingit Reserves	1–3	Rakuunat
Esse IK Reserves	0–3	JBK
PJK	4–1	Pallo-Iirot
FCV	1–1 (aet)	PK-37
FCV won 5–4 on penalties
TP–47 Reserves	2–3	TUS
TPV Juniors	3–1	SalPa
FC Nets	1–6	GBK
PPV	2–1 (aet)	KTP
FC Kiffen Veterans	1–3 (aet)	FC Espoo Reserves
KoPa	1–2	RiRa
JäPS	4–1	PK Keski–Uusimaa
SUMU	0–3	Ponnistus
FC Turku–82	0–5	PP-70
NJS	1–4 (aet)	FC Espoo

Home team	Score	Away team
HauPa	1–7	TP-47
Öja	1–4	KPV
SalReipas	1–3	PK-35
SC KuFu–98	1–2	JJK
LeKi	2–3	YIlves
Lieto	4–1	RuoVi
JPS	3–7	SC Riverball
FC Honka Reserves	1–0	HyPS
IK Myran	1–6	RoPS
TiPS	2–2 (aet)	HDS
HDS won 5–4 on penalties
PEPO	0–2	HJK Helsinki
FC POHU	0–2	KooTeePee
FC Korsholm	0–4	Jaro
S.C. Zulimanit	1–2	Huima
Karhu	1–4	SJK
PP–70 Reserves	1–2	VPS–j
TPK	0–1	Norrvalla FF
AC Vantaa	0–1	City Stars
FC Tigers	0–4	Inter Turku
IFK Jakobstad	0–2	FC OPA
Purha	0–5	MyPa
Kasiysi PMP	1–1 (aet)	LoPa
LoPa won 4–2 on penalties
SiPS Juniors	0–4	KuPS
FC Santa Claus	0–1	VPS
EBK	1–3	Lahti
KTP Veterans	2–1	PEPO Reserves
TuPV	1–3	Sinimustat
I–kissat	4–2 (aet)	FJK

== Fifth round ==
The draw for this round was conducted on 20 May 2008. The winners of the Fourth Round participated in this round. Matches were played between June 1 – 11, 2008.

Team 1	Score	Team 2
YIlves	0–7	Gnistan
RiRa	0–9	MyPa
Warkaus JK	2–1	JJK
KTP Veterans	0–2	KooTeePee
Ponnistus	1–13	Lahti
HDS	0–10	HJK Helsinki
SJK	0–5	RoPS
PPV	0–1	City Stars
FCV	0–3	KuPS
JäPS	1–2	Atlantis FC
SC Riverball	1–6	VPS
Lieto	2–0	I–Kissat
PJK	0–1	FC Viikingit
FC Espoo Reserves	3–1 (aet)	ToiP–49
AC Oulu	0–1	JIPPO
FC YPA	0–1	TP-47
JBK	2–3	KPV
PP-70	0–3	LoPa
FC Espoo	0–2	Inter Turku
ÅIFK	1–6	Rakuunat
FC Honka Reserves	5–0	VPS–j
TPV Juniors	2–2 (aet, p. 4–5)	HIFK
Ilves	2–0 (aet)	TPV
Huima	1–2	PS Kemi
FC OPA	1–4	Jaro
Norrvalla FF	1–5	PK-35
TUS	2–1	GBK
FC Kuusankoski	1–2	Sinimustat

== Sixth Round ==
The draw for this round was conducted on 12 June 2008. The 28 winners of the Fifth Round, along with the last four Veikkausliiga teams which entered in this round, were drawn into 16 matches for this round. Matches were played on June 17 and 19, 2008.

Team 1	Score	Team 2
Atlantis FC	0–3	TPS
Jaro	2–0	Lahti
HJK Helsinki	1–0	Inter Turku
KuPS	2–1	KooTeePee
RoPS	0–1	Warkaus JK
Honka	3–0	KPV
Tampere United	14–0	FC Espoo Reserves
FC Viikingit	3–1	City Stars
JIPPO	1–1 (aet, p. 6–7)	Rakuunat
PK-35	2–3	FC Honka Reserves
PS Kemi	3–1	Sinimustat
Gnistan	6–0	Lieto
HIFK	1–2	TP-47
Ilves	1–6	VPS
LoPa	0–3	Haka
TUS	0–7	MyPa

== Seventh Round ==
The draw for this round was conducted on 22 June 2008. The winners of Sixth Round participated in this round. The first six matches were played on 2 July while the other two games took place on 9 July 2008.

Team 1	Score	Team 2
Honka	4–0	FC Honka Reserves
Gnistan	0–1	VPS
Tampere United	3–0	FC Viikingit
Warkaus JK	5–0	Rakuunat
TP-47	3–2 (aet)	Jaro
MyPa	6–2	PS Kemi
KuPS	0–2	HJK Helsinki
TPS	0–1	Haka

== Quarter-finals ==
The draw for this round was conducted on 14 July 2008. The first three matches were played on 7 August 2008. The match between Honka and Tampere United has been postponed to a later date because of the Tampere's participation in the UEFA Champions League 2008–09 qualification rounds.

7 August 2008
18:30 EEST

Haka	3 – 0	TP-47
Minkenen 6'; Popovitch 65'; Kangaskorpi 70'

Tehtaan kenttä, Valkeakoski

7 August 2008
18:30 EEST

VPS	1 – 0	MyPa
Hietaharju 80' (pen.)

Hietalahti, Vaasa

7 August 2008
18:30 EEST

HJK Helsinki	2 – 0	Warkaus JK
Bah 88'; Parikka 89'

Finnair Stadium, Helsinki

22 October 2008
18:30 EEST

Honka	2 – 0 (aet)	Tampere United
Jalasto 98'; Lepola 100'

Tapiolan Urheilupuisto, Espoo

== Semi-finals ==
29 October 2008
18:30 EET

Haka	0 – 1	Honka
		27' Weckström

Tehtaan kenttä, Valkeakoski

29 October 2008
18:30 EET

HJK Helsinki	5 – 0	VPS
Roiha 29' 52'; Zeneli 56'; Parikka 67'; Ikäläinen 90' (o.g.)

Finnair Stadium, Helsinki

== Final ==
1 November 2008
15:00 EET

HJK Helsinki	2 – 1 (aet)	Honka
Zeneli 57'; Oravainen 114'		Puustinen 89'

Finnair Stadium, Helsinki
