= Veli Lampi =

Finnish footballer (born 1984)

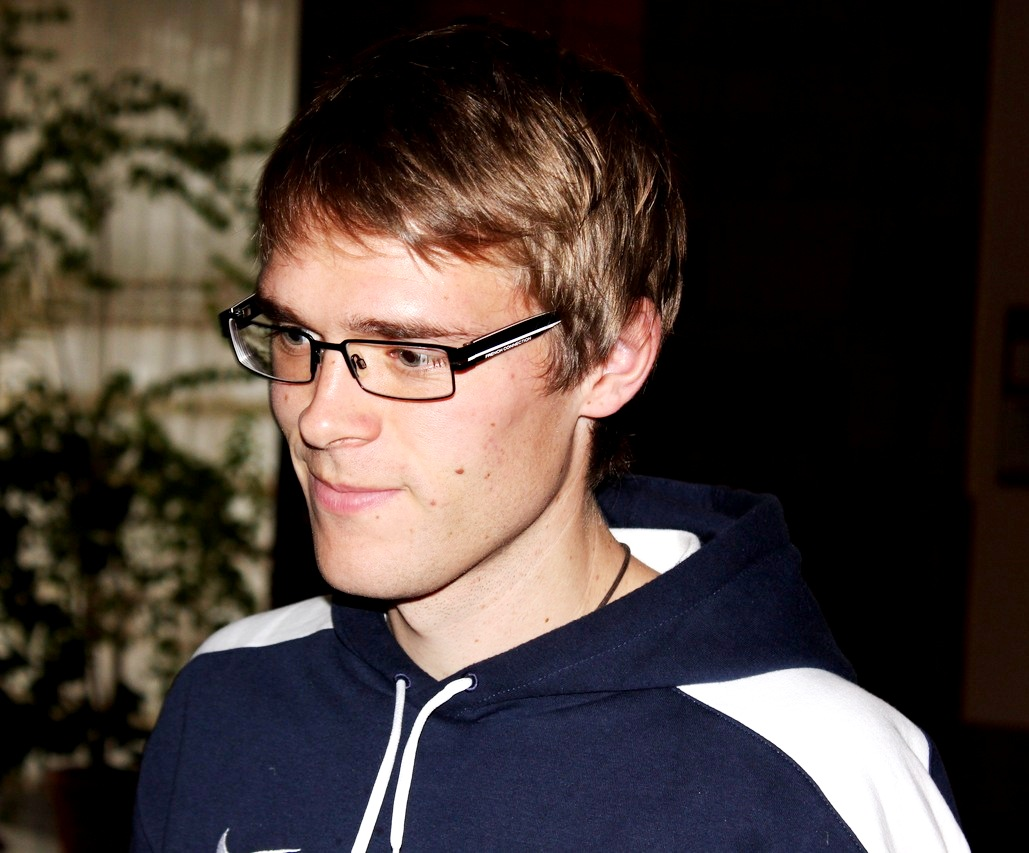
- Lampi in 2011

Personal information
- Date of birth: 18 July 1984 (age 42)
- Place of birth: Seinäjoki, Finland
- Height: 1.81 m (5 ft 11 in)
- Position: Right-back

Team information
- Current team: VPS (team manager)

Youth career
- 1995–2002: Sepsi-78

Senior career*
Years	Team	Apps	(Gls)
2002–2004	VPS	47	(6)
2005–2006	HJK	49	(0)
2007–2010	Zürich	75	(0)
2010	→ Aarau (loan)	16	(0)
2010–2011	Willem II	28	(0)
2011–2013	Arsenal Kyiv	20	(1)
2014–2015	HJK	37	(1)
2016–2017	VPS	44	(0)

International career
	Finland U16	5	(0)
	Finland U19	3	(0)
	Finland U21	19	(1)
2006–2015	Finland	33	(0)

Managerial career
- 2025–: VPS (team manager)
Medal record
Finland national football team
Third place	Baltic Cup	2014
HJK Helsinki
Runner-up	Veikkausliiga	2005
Winner	Finnish Cup	2006
Runner-up	Veikkausliiga	2006
Winner	Veikkausliiga	2014
FC Zürich
Winner	Swiss Super League	2007
Winner	Swiss Super League	2009
- * Club domestic league appearances and goals

Veli Lampi (born 18 July 1984) is a Finnish former professional footballer who played as a right-back. He is currently working for VPS as team manager. Lampi was born in Seinäjoki, Southern Ostrobothnia, Finland where he played for the local youth teams before moving to VPS.

== Club career ==
=== Youth clubs ===
Lampi started his football career in Sepsi-78. He has also played for TP-Seinäjoki.

He made his Veikkausliiga debut in VPS where he played 47 matches and scored 6 goals between 2002 and 2004.

In 2005 Lampi transferred from VPS to HJK. He represented HJK in 49 matches and achieved two Veikkausliiga silver medals and a cup victory.

He was part of the 2006–07 and 2008–09 Swiss Championship winning team with FC Zürich.

He relegated from the Eredivisie with Willem II.

On 10 September 2011, Lampi made his Ukrainian Premier League début for Arsenal Kyiv playing against Metalist Kharkiv.

In December 2013 HJK announced that Lampi would return to HJK and that he had signed a two-year contract.

== International career ==
Lampi was a regular member in the Finland national under-21 football team. In 2006, he made his debut for the full national side in a game against Saudi Arabia. He played five games in the 2010 FIFA World Cup qualification.

== Coaching career ==
After his retirement, Lampi has coached in the youth sector of VPS. In the beginning of May 2025, Lampi was named the team manager for VPS first team.

== Personal life ==
His father is a former footballer Mikko Lampi.

== Career statistics ==
=== Club ===
As of 31 December 2017

Appearances and goals by club, season and competition
Club	Season	League			Cups (Note: Includes Suomen Cup, Finnish League Cup, Swiss Cup, KNVB Beker and Ukrainian Cup)		Europe		Total	
Club	Season	Division	Apps	Goals	Apps	Goals	Apps	Goals	Apps	Goals
Sepsi-78	2001	Kakkonen	12	3	0	0	–		12	3
VPS	2002	Veikkausliiga	7	0	0	0	–		7	0
VPS	2003	Veikkausliiga	18	2	0	0	–		18	2
VPS	2004	Veikkausliiga	22	4	0	0	–		22	4
VPS	Total		47	6	0	0	0	0	47	6
HJK Helsinki	2005	Veikkausliiga	26	0	0	0	–		26	0
HJK Helsinki	2006	Veikkausliiga	23	0	1	0	2 (Note: Includes UEFA Champions League and UEFA Cup)	0	26	0
HJK Helsinki	Total		49	0	1	0	2	0	52	0
FC Zürich	2006–07	Swiss Super League	11	0	1	0	–		12	0
FC Zürich	2007–08	Swiss Super League	24	0	3	0	5 (Note: Includes UEFA Cup)	0	32	0
FC Zürich	2008–09	Swiss Super League	28	0	3	0	3	0	34	0
FC Zürich	2009–10	Swiss Super League	12	0	2	0	4 (Note: Includes UEFA Champions League)	0	18	0
FC Zürich	Total		75	0	9	0	12	0	82	0
Aarau (loan)	2009–10	Swiss Super League	16	0	–		–		16	0
Willem II	2010–11	Eredivisie	28	0	1	0	–		29	0
Arsenal Kyiv	2011–12	Ukrainian Premier League	12	1	1	0	–		13	1
Arsenal Kyiv	2012–13	Ukrainian Premier League	3	0	0	0	–		3	0
Arsenal Kyiv	2013–14	Ukrainian Premier League	5	0	1	0	–		6	0
Arsenal Kyiv	Total		20	1	2	0	0	0	22	1
HJK Helsinki	2014	Veikkausliiga	23	1	3	0	10 (Note: Includes UEFA Champions League and UEFA Europa League)	0	36	1
HJK Helsinki	2015	Veikkausliiga	14	0	7	0	0	0	21	0
HJK Helsinki	Total		37	1	10	0	10	0	57	1
VPS	2016	Veikkausliiga	21	0	5	0	–		26	0
VPS	2017	Veikkausliiga	24	0	5	0	4 (Note: Includes UEFA Europa League)	0	33	0
VPS	Total		45	0	10	0	4	0	59	0
Career total			331	11	33	0	28	0	392	11

=== International ===
As of 3 March 2015

Appearances and goals by national team and year
National team	Year	Apps	Goals
Finland	2006	3	0
Finland	2007	1	0
Finland	2008	8	0
Finland	2009	4	0
Finland	2010	6	0
Finland	2011	4	0
Finland	2012	1	0
Finland	2013	4	0
Finland	2014	1	0
Finland	2015	1	0
Total		33	0

== Honours ==
HJK Helsinki

- Veikkausliiga: 2014
- Finnish Cup: 2006, 2014
- Finnish League Cup: 2015

FC Zürich

- Swiss Super League: 2006–07, 2008–09

Finland

- Baltic Cup bronze: 2014
