= Petri Oravainen =

Finnish footballer (born 1983)

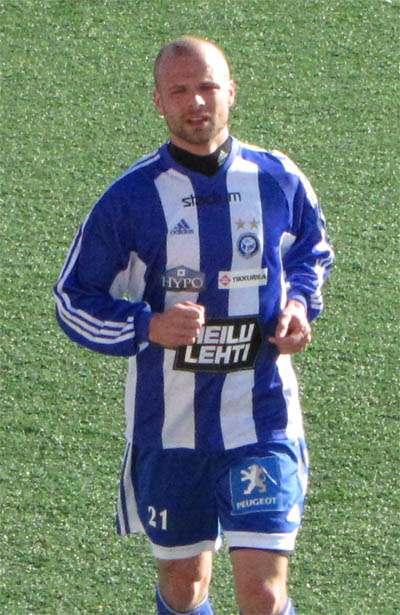
- Oravainen with HJK in 2009

Personal information
- Date of birth: 26 January 1983 (age 43)
- Place of birth: Helsinki, Finland
- Height: 1.77 m (5 ft 10 in)
- Position: Winger

Youth career
- Puistolan Urheilijat
- Käpylän Pallo

Senior career*
| Years | Team | Apps | (Gls) |
| 2001–2006 | HJK | 98 | (18) |
| 2006–2008 | Zwolle | 24 | (4) |
| 2008–2009 | HJK | 35 | (4) |
| 2010–2012 | KuPS | 47 | (3) |
| 2012–2013 | PK-35 Vantaa | 25 | (3) |
| 2014–2015 | PuiU | 35 | (21) |

International career^{‡}
| 2004 | Finland | 2 | (0) |
- * Club domestic league appearances and goals as of 21:41, 10 June 2020 (UTC) ‡ National team caps and goals as of 27 August 2008

Petri Oravainen (born 26 January 1983) is a Finnish former footballer, who represented HJK Helsinki and KuPS in the Veikkausliiga and FC Zwolle in the Netherlands. Oravainen, who is 177 cm tall, played as a winger on both left and right side. He made his debut at the senior level in 2001 at the age of 18.

== Club career ==
Oravainen joined HJK as a thirteen-year-old. Before moving to Finnish top club's youth team, he had played in smaller junior clubs in the capital area. In 2001, he debuted in the first team and was said to be one of the most talented youth players in the league. In 2004, he was called up to the national team for the first time. However, a run of injuries disturbed his development and he could not really live up to the high expectations. He became one of the fans' favourites and especially his pace was a danger for many opponents.

He decided to take a look at playing abroad and signed a contract with FC Zwolle in the Dutch Eerste Divisie in 2006. He had a good start, but after another injury to his ankle he was out for several months and lost his place in the first team. After 16 matches and 4 goals, he moved back to Finland and joined his former club HJK Helsinki. In the 2008 season he played a total of 20 league games for 'Klubi' in which he scored four times.

'Pexi' had a big share in the victory over FC Honka in the Finnish Cup 2008 final. In own Finnair Stadium the home team beat the visitors from Espoo with 2–1 after extra time. Oravainen scored the winning goal after 114 minutes with a magnificent strike from just outside the penalty box. That goal delivered HJK the 10th Finnish Cup victory in its history and the third one for Oravainen himself.

== Career statistics ==
As of 1 September 2024.

Appearances and goals by club, season and competition
| Club | Season | League | | | Cup (Note: Includes Suomen Cup) | | League cup | | Europe | | Total | |
| Club | Season | Division | Apps | Goals | Apps | Goals | Apps | Goals | Apps | Goals | Apps | Goals |
|---|---|---|---|---|---|---|---|---|---|---|---|---|
| HJK | 2001 | Veikkausliiga | 5 | 0 | – | | – | | – | | 5 | 0 |
| HJK | 2002 | Veikkausliiga | 24 | 4 | – | | – | | 1 (Note: Appearance(s) in UEFA Cup) | 0 | 25 | 4 |
| HJK | 2003 | Veikkausliiga | 10 | 1 | 1 | 0 | – | | – | | 11 | 1 |
| HJK | 2004 | Veikkausliiga | 26 | 7 | – | | – | | 4 (Note: Appearances in UEFA Champions League) | 0 | 30 | 7 |
| HJK | 2005 | Veikkausliiga | 21 | 4 | – | | – | | – | | 21 | 4 |
| HJK | 2006 | Veikkausliiga | 12 | 2 | 2 | 0 | – | | 2 | 0 | 16 | 2 |
| HJK | Total | | 98 | 20 | 3 | 0 | 0 | 0 | 7 | 0 | 108 | 20 |
| Zwolle | 2006–07 | Eerste Divisie | 12 | 4 | – | | – | | – | | 12 | 4 |
| Zwolle | 2007–08 | Eerste Divisie | 12 | 0 | – | | – | | – | | 12 | 0 |
| Zwolle | Total | | 24 | 4 | 0 | 0 | 0 | 0 | 0 | 0 | 24 | 4 |
| HJK | 2008 | Veikkausliiga | 20 | 4 | 2 | 1 | – | | 0 | 0 | 22 | 5 |
| HJK | 2009 | Veikkausliiga | 15 | 0 | 1 | 0 | 9 | 0 | 1 (Note: Appearance(s) in UEFA Europa League) | 0 | 26 | 0 |
| HJK | Total | | 35 | 4 | 3 | 1 | 9 | 0 | 1 | 0 | 48 | 5 |
| KuPS | 2010 | Veikkausliiga | 22 | 2 | 3 | 1 | – | | – | | 25 | 3 |
| KuPS | 2011 | Veikkausliiga | 25 | 2 | 1 | 0 | – | | 2 | 0 | 28 | 2 |
| KuPS | Total | | 47 | 4 | 4 | 1 | 0 | 0 | 2 | 0 | 53 | 5 |
| PK-35 Vantaa | 2012 | Ykkönen | 15 | 1 | – | | – | | – | | 15 | 1 |
| PK-35 Vantaa | 2013 | Ykkönen | 10 | 2 | 2 | 1 | – | | – | | 12 | 3 |
| PK-35 Vantaa | Total | | 25 | 3 | 2 | 1 | 0 | 0 | 0 | 0 | 27 | 4 |
| Puistolan Urheilijat | 2015 | Kolmonen | 17 | 12 | – | | – | | 2 (Note: Appearances in UEFA Regions' Cup) | 2 | 19 | 14 |
| Puistolan Urheilijat | 2016 | Kolmonen | 16 | 9 | – | | – | | 2 | 4 | 18 | 13 |
| Puistolan Urheilijat | Total | | 33 | 21 | 0 | 0 | 0 | 0 | 4 | 6 | 37 | 27 |
| Career total | | | 262 | 54 | 12 | 3 | 9 | 0 | 14 | 6 | 297 | 63 |

== Honours ==
HJK

- Veikkausliiga: 2002, 2003, 2009
- Finnish Cup: 2003, 2006, 2008
