= Timo Marjamaa =

Finnish footballer (born 1976)

Personal information
- Full name: Timo Tapio Marjamaa
- Date of birth: 27 June 1976 (age 50)
- Place of birth: Lahti, Finland
- Height: 1.82 m (6 ft 0 in)
- Position: Defender

Youth career
- 1987–1995: Kuusysi

Senior career*
Years	Team	Apps	(Gls)
1995–1996	Kuusysi	27	(3)
1997–1999	Lahti	77	(14)
2000–2001	Jokerit	64	(3)
2002	Yimpaş Yozgatspor	9	(0)
2002	Lahti	21	(2)
2003–2005	AC Allianssi	68	(3)
2006–2007	HJK	17	(0)

International career
1996–1997	Finland U21	2	(0)
2000–2001	Finland	6	(1)
- * Club domestic league appearances and goals as of 16 May 2024

Timo Tapio Marjamaa (born 27 June 1976) is a Finnish sports executive and a former professional footballer who played as a defender. Marjamaa is currently the chief executive officer of Finnish top-tier league Veikkausliiga, having started in the position in November 2010.

== Club career ==
Marjamaa was born in Lahti and played in a youth sector of local club FC Kuusysi, before making his senior debut with the club's first team in Veikkausliiga in the 1995 season. During his career, he represented FC Lahti, FC Jokerit, AC Allianssi and HJK Helsinki in Finland in Veikkausliiga, and briefly played in Turkish Süper Lig with Yimpaş Yozgatspor in 2002. Marjamaa ended his professional playing career after the 2007 season due to consecutive knee injuries. He played a total of 199 Veikkausliiga matches, scoring 13 goals and winning the Finnish Cup championship with HJK in 2006.

== International career ==
A former youth international, Marjamaa was capped six times for Finland national football team in friendly matches during 2000–2001, scoring one goal against Sweden.

== Later career ==
After retiring as a player, Marjamaa graduated MBA in the University of Helsinki School of Economics in November 2007. In his master's thesis, he studied the image of Finnish football. He also worked in a bank sector, before he was appointed the chief executive officer of the top-tier Finnish football league Veikkausliiga in November 2010.

== Career statistics ==
=== Club ===
As of 16 May 2024.

Appearances and goals by club, season and competition
Club	Season	League			Cup (Note: Includes Suomen Cup)		Europe		Total	
Club	Season	Division	Apps	Goals	Apps	Goals	Apps	Goals	Apps	Goals
Kuusysi	1995	Veikkausliiga	2	0	0	0	–		2	0
Kuusysi	1996	Ykkönen	25	3	0	0	–		25	3
Kuusysi	Total		27	3	0	0	–	–	27	3
Lahti	1997	Ykkönen	26	3					26	3
Lahti	1998	Ykkönen	24	6					24	6
Lahti	1999	Veikkausliiga	27	5	0	0	–		27	5
Lahti	Total		77	14	0	0	–	–	77	14
Jokerit	2000	Veikkausliiga	31	1	0	0	2 (Note: Includes UEFA Cup)	0	33	1
Jokerit	2001	Veikkausliiga	33	2	0	0	2	0	35	2
Jokerit	Total		64	3	0	0	4	0	68	3
Yimpaş Yozgatspor	2001–02	Süper Lig	9	0	0	0	–		9	0
Lahti	2002	Veikkausliiga	21	2	1	0	–		22	2
AC Allianssi	2003	Veikkausliiga	24	0	1	0	6 (Note: Includes UEFA Intertoto Cup)	0	31	0
AC Allianssi	2004	Veikkausliiga	26	0	0	0	2	0	28	0
AC Allianssi	2005	Veikkausliiga	18	3	0	0	4	0	22	3
AC Allianssi	Total		68	3	1	0	12	0	81	3
HJK Helsinki	2006	Veikkausliiga	17	0	1	0	2	0	20	0
Career total			283	25	3	0	18	0	304	25

=== International ===
Finland
Year	Apps	Goals
2000	3	0
2001	3	1
Total	6	1

=== International goals ===
As of match played 1 February 2001. Finland score listed first, score column indicates score after each Marjamaa goal.

List of international goals scored by Timo Marjamaa
No.	Date	Venue	Opponent	Score	Result	Competition
1	1 February 2001	Tipshallen, Jönköping, Sweden	Sweden	1–0	1–0	2000–01 Nordic Football Championship

== Honours ==
HJK

- Finnish Cup: 2006
- Veikkausliiga runner-up: 2006

AC Allianssi

- Veikkausliiga runner-up: 2004
- Finnish League Cup: 2005

Jokerit

- Veikkausliiga runner-up: 2000
