= Segun Ikudehinbu =

Nigerian footballer (born 1989)

Personal information
- Full name: Segun Victor Ikudehinbu
- Date of birth: June 16, 1989 (age 37)
- Place of birth: Lagos, Nigeria
- Height: 1.80 m (5 ft 11 in)
- Position: Midfielder

Youth career
- FC Goal International Academy, Lagos

Senior career*
Years	Team	Apps	(Gls)
2009	Goal FC of Ikeja	52	(10)
2009	KuPS	9	(0)
2010–2011	FC Piatra Olt	6	(0)
2011–2012	Warkaus JK	26	(4)
2012-2013	KTP	31	(4)
2013-2015	Warkaus Jk	68	(21)
2015-2016	JIPPO	32	(5)
2015-2016	Warkaus Jk	20	(1)
2016-2017	Kontu	23	(3)
2017-2018	Atlantis	28	(5)
- * Club domestic league appearances and goals as of 12 October 2009

Segun Victor Ikudehinbu (born June 16, 1989) is a Nigerian former professional footballer who played as a midfielder.

In September 2017, Ikudehinbu was sentenced to two years and two months imprisonment for two counts of rape. Itä-Suomi Court of Appeals upheld the sentence passed previously by Pohjois-Savo District Court. The rapes took place in Kuopio, fall 2015. The defendant denied any wrongdoing and claimed the intercourse was consensual.
