= 2002 Ykkönen – Finnish League Division 1 =

Finnish League Division 1
- Season: 2002

League tables for teams participating in Ykkönen, the second tier of the Finnish Soccer League system, in 2002.

== League tables ==
=== Preliminary Stage, Southern Zone ===
Pos	Team	Pld	W	D	L	GF	GA	GD	Pts	Qualification
1	KooTeePee Kotka	16	12	2	2	36	10	+26	38	Qualification to Promotion group
2	Jokerit Helsinki	16	10	3	3	30	20	+10	33	Qualification to Promotion group
3	FC Honka Espoo	16	8	3	5	32	17	+15	27	Qualification to Relegation group
4	PP-70 Tampere	16	8	3	5	29	23	+6	27	Qualification to Relegation group
5	FC Kuusankoski	16	6	3	7	16	18	−2	21	Qualification to Relegation group
6	Rakuunat Lappeenranta	16	5	4	7	19	24	−5	19	Qualification to Relegation group
7	HIFK Helsinki	16	4	4	8	17	30	−13	16	Qualification to Relegation group
8	Viikingit Helsinki	16	2	5	9	22	37	−15	11	Qualification to Relegation group
9	Gnistan Helsinki	16	2	3	11	10	32	−22	9	Qualification to Relegation group

HIK Hanko and Jokrut Helsinki withdrew

Top two to promotion/relegation group, the rest to Division One Relegation Group.

=== Preliminary Stage, Northern Zone ===
Pos	Team	Pld	W	D	L	GF	GA	GD	Pts	Qualification
1	TPS Turku	16	11	3	2	40	17	+23	36	Qualification to Promotion group
2	TP-47 Tornio	16	8	5	3	29	21	+8	29	Qualification to Promotion group
3	GBK Kokkola	16	8	3	5	30	18	+12	27	Qualification to Relegation group
4	RoPS Rovaniemi	16	8	3	5	35	25	+10	27	Qualification to Relegation group
5	Tervarit Oulu	16	6	4	6	22	23	−1	22	Qualification to Relegation group
6	Kraft Närpiö	16	6	1	9	23	35	−12	19	Qualification to Relegation group
7	VG-62 Naantali	16	4	4	8	16	20	−4	16	Qualification to Relegation group
8	TP Seinäjoki	16	4	2	10	16	33	−17	14	Qualification to Relegation group
9	FC Korsholm Mustasaari	16	3	3	10	16	35	−19	12	Qualification to Relegation group

TPV Tampere withdrew; their divisional place was inherited by GBK Kokkola, the best non-promoted runner-up of the Division Two regional groups previous season. PP-70 Tampere

were moved to the Southern Zone.

Top two to promotion/relegation group, the rest to Division One Relegation Group.

=== Promotion/relegation group ===
Pos	Team	Pld	W	D	L	GF	GA	GD	Pts	Promotion
1	KuPS Kuopio	7	4	1	2	14	4	+10	16	Remain in Veikkausliiga
2	TPS Turku (P)	7	4	2	1	10	9	+1	15	Promotion to Veikkausliiga
3	FC Hämeenlinna	7	3	0	4	8	8	0	11	Remain in Veikkausliiga
4	Jokerit Helsinki (P)	7	3	1	3	13	13	0	10	Promotion to Veikkausliiga
5	Jazz Pori (Note: formerly PPT Pori)	7	2	3	2	6	5	+1	9	Remain in Veikkausliiga
6	KooTeePee Kotka (P)	7	2	2	3	8	11	−3	9	Promotion to Veikkausliiga
7	VPS Vaasa (R)	7	2	2	3	6	12	−6	9	
8	TP-47 Tornio	7	2	1	4	6	9	−3	7	

(P) Promoted; (R) Relegated
Notes:

Top six to Premier Division 2003, the rest to Division One 2003.

Note: The teams obtained bonus points on the basis of their preliminary stage position.

=== Relegation Group, Southern Zone ===
Pos	Team	Pld	W	D	L	GF	GA	GD	Pts	Qualification or relegation
1	Honka Espoo	22	11	5	6	46	26	+20	38	
2	FC Kuusankoski	22	10	5	7	32	25	+7	35	
3	PP-70 Tampere	22	10	5	7	35	30	+5	35	
4	Rakuunat Lappeenranta	22	7	6	9	24	33	−9	27	
5	HIFK Fotboll (O)	22	6	6	10	27	41	−14	24	Qualification to Relegation playoffs
6	Viikingit Helsinki (O)	22	3	7	12	31	45	−14	16	Qualification to Relegation playoffs
7	Gnistan Helsinki (R)	22	3	3	16	16	47	−31	12	Relegation to Kakkonen

(O) Play-off winners; (R) Relegated

=== Relegation Group, Northern Zone ===
Pos	Team	Pld	W	D	L	GF	GA	GD	Pts	Qualification or relegation
1	GBK Kokkola	22	9	4	9	36	30	+6	31	
2	VG-62 Naantali	22	9	4	9	29	26	+3	31	
3	RoPS Rovaniemi	22	9	4	9	41	40	+1	31	
4	Tervarit Oulu	22	8	6	8	31	30	+1	30	
5	Kraft Närpiö (O)	22	9	3	10	36	41	−5	30	Qualification to Relegation playoffs
6	FC Korsholm Mustasaari (R)	22	6	5	11	29	43	−14	23	Qualification to Relegation playoffs
7	TP Seinäjoki (R)	22	6	2	14	23	46	−23	20	Relegation to Kakkonen

(O) Play-off winners; (R) Relegated

=== Promotion/relegation playoffs ===
- FC Espoo – HIFK Helsinki 3–3
- HIFK Helsinki – FC Espoo, 2–2
- WJK Varkaus* – Viikingit Helsinki 0–3
- Viikingit Helsinki – WJK Varkaus 3–2
- TPV Tampere – Kraft Närpiö 0–2
- Kraft, Närpiö – TPV, Tampere 4–0
- OLS Oulu – FC Korsholm Mustasaari 1–2
- FC Korsholm Mustasaari – OLS Oulu 0–6

NB: * formerly WP-35 Varkaus, who merged with VarTP Varkaus

OLS Oulu promoted, Korsholm Mustasaari relegated. HIFK Helsinki, Viikingit Helsinki and Kraft Närpiö remained in Division One.

No teams directly promoted from Division Two.

== Leading goal-scorers ==
- 17 - Janne Kauria - FC Honka
- 11 - Jarno Auremaa - TPS
- 11 - Niclas Grönholm - RoPS
- 11 - Mikko Hyyrynen - TPS
- 11 - Mikko Mäkelä - PP-70
- 11 - Marko Rajamäki - TPS
- 10 - Matti Heimo - VG-62
- 10 - Juho Mäkelä - Tervarit
- 10 - Timo Peltola - GBK
- 10 - Zeddy Saileti - RoPS
- 10 - Sead Ustic - Kraft
