= 2006 Finnish Cup =

2004 Suomen Cup
Tournament details
- Country: Finland
- Teams: 386

Final positions
- Champions: HJK
- Runners-up: KPV

The 2006 Finnish Cup (Finnish: Suomen Cup) was the 52nd season of the main annual association football cup competition in Finland. It was organised as a single-elimination knock–out tournament and participation in the competition was voluntary. A total of 386 teams registered for the competition.

== Quarter-finals ==
Tie no	Home team	Score	Away team	Goals
1	KPV	3–0	PS Kemi	Bah 4, 73, 86
2	HJK	2–1	FC Lahti	Parikka 81, 85; Aho 65 o.g
3	TPS	1–0	KuPS	Heimo 70
4	FC Inter	0–2	Tampere United	Pertot 84, Niemi 90

== Semi-finals ==
18 October 2006	Helsingin Jalkapalloklubi	2–1 (a.e.t.)	Tampere United	Helsinki
17:30	Ghazi 21'; Parikka 114'	Report	39' Kujala	Stadium: Telia 5G -areena Attendance: ? Referee: ?

18 October 2006	Turun Palloseura	0–1	Kokkolan Palloveikot	Turku
17:30		Report	35' Seppälä	Stadium: Veritas Stadion; Attendance: ? Referee: ?

== Final ==
=== Details ===
4 November 2006
17:30

Helsingin Jalkapalloklubi	1-0	Kokkolan Palloveikot
Ghazi 63'	Report

Finnair Stadium, Helsinki
Attendance: 2,447

HJK	KPV

GK	1	(Finland) Ville Wallén
DF	5	(Finland) Timo Marjamaa (c)
DF	6	(Finland) Iiro Aalto
MF	7	(Finland) Vili Savolainen
MF	8	(Finland) Antti Pohja
FW	9	(Algeria) Farid Ghazi
DF	11	(Finland) Veli Lampi	(substituted off) 90'
DF	18	(Finland) Tuomas Aho
MF	22	(Finland) Markus Halsti
FW	24	(Finland) Erfan Zeneli	(substituted off) 73'
DF	27	(Finland) Sebastian Sorsa
Substitutes :
FW	16	(Finland) Jarno Parikka	(substituted on) 90'
MF	21	(Finland) Petri Oravainen	(substituted on) 73'
MF	?	(Algeria) Mohamed Medjoudj
MF	?	(Kosovo) Mehmet Hetemaj
MF	?	(Sierra Leone) John Keister
MF	?	(Finland) Petri Oravainen
FW	?	(Finland) Jarno Parikka
Manager :
(England) Keith Armstrong

GK	37	(Finland) Janne Björkgren
MF	6	(Finland) Petri Piispanen
DF	7	(The Gambia) Abdoulie Corr
FW	9	(Jamaica) Ramon Bailey
MF	10	(The Gambia) Dawda Bah
FW	15	(Finland) Henri Myntti (c)
MF	20	(Finland) Arttu Seppälä
FW	21	(Finland) Janne Suutari
MF	23	(South Africa) Chad Botha
DF	30	(Finland) Hannu Ypyä	(substituted off) 73' (18)
DF	31	(Finland) Juha Reini	(substituted off) 73' (22)
Substitutes :
DF	18	(Finland) Niko Kalliokoski	(substituted on) 73'
DF	22	(Finland) Joonas Pennanen	(substituted on) 73'
??	?	(Finland) Tapani Moilanen
??	?	(Finland) Matias Nygård
??	?	(Finland) Markus Palosaari
DF	?	(Finland) Niko Kalliokoski
MF	?	(Finland) Joonas Pennanen
MF	?	(Finland) Ville Luokkala
Manager :
(Finland) Harri Kevari

MATCH OFFICIALS

- Assistant referees:
- Fourth official:
