= Hietalahti =

Hietalahti (Sandviken in Swedish) may refer to:

- Hietalahti, Helsinki is a seaside district in Helsinki, Finland
- Hietalahti, Vaasa is a seaside district in Vaasa, Finland
- Hietalahti shipyard

== People with the surname ==
- Kari Hietalahti (born 1964), Finnish actor and writer
- Vesa Hietalahti (born 1969), Finnish biathlete
