= Antti Pohja =

Finnish footballer (born 1977)

Personal information
- Full name: Antti Heikki Pohja
- Date of birth: 11 January 1977 (age 49)
- Place of birth: Lahti, Finland
- Height: 1.72 m (5 ft 8 in)
- Positions: Midfielder; striker

Senior career*
Years	Team	Apps	(Gls)
1994	Kuusysi	14	(3)
1995–1998	MYPA	74	(16)
1998	FinnPa	13	(1)
1999	Jokerit	11	(0)
1999	→ TPV (loan)	1	(0)
1999	→ VPS (loan)	12	(3)
2000–2001	Tampere United	64	(28)
2002–2003	Hammarby	47	(10)
2004	Tampere United	25	(16)
2005	Vaduz	31	(7)
2006	HJK	22	(11)
2007–2010	Tampere United	65	(9)

International career^{‡}
1996–2008	Finland	23	(3)
- * Club domestic league appearances and goals as of 11 April 2009 ‡ National team caps and goals as of 14 September 2010

Antti Heikki Pohja (born 11 January 1977) is a Finnish former professional football player. His position was forward and midfielder. Pohja won the Finnish championship playing for Tampere United in 2001 and he was the top scorer of Veikkausliiga in 2004 when he scored 16 goals. Besides playing in Finland, he has represented Swedish club Hammarby IF in Allsvenskan and Liechtensteiner club FC Vaduz in Swiss Challenge League.

On 9 September 2010 he announced that he would retire from the game after the 2010 season.

He has won 23 international caps for Finland national football team, scoring three goals.

After his playing career, Pohja has worked as a football pundit for Yle.

== Career statistics ==
=== Club ===
As of 31 December 2010

Appearances and goals by club, season and competition
Club	Season	League			Cup (Note: Includes Suomen Cup and Liechtensteiner Cup)		League cup (Note: Includes Finnish League Cup)		Europe		Total	
Club	Season	Division	Apps	Goals	Apps	Goals	Apps	Goals	Apps	Goals	Apps	Goals
Kuusysi	1994	Veikkausliiga	14	3	–		–		–		14	3
MYPA	1995	Veikkausliiga	18	5	–		–		3 (Note: Appearances in UEFA Cup)	0	21	5
MYPA	1996	Veikkausliiga	25	9	–		–		4 (Note: Appearances in UEFA Cup Winners' Cup)	0	29	9
MYPA	1997	Veikkausliiga	25	2	–		–		2	0	27	2
MYPA	1998	Veikkausliiga	7	0	–		–		–		7	0
MYPA	Total		65	16	0	0	0	0	1	0	15	1
Lahti (loan)	1998	Ykkönen	3	0	–		–		–		3	0
FinnPa	1998	Veikkausliiga	13	1	–		–		2	0	15	1
Jokerit	1999	Veikkausliiga	11	0	–		–		1 (Note: Appearances in UEFA Intertoto Cup)	0	12	0
TPV (loan)	1999	Veikkausliiga	1	0	–		–		–		1	0
VPS (loan)	1999	Veikkausliiga	12	3	–		–		2	1	14	4
Tampere United	2000	Veikkausliiga	31	12	–		–		–		31	12
Tampere United	2001	Veikkausliiga	33	16	1	0	–		–		34	16
Tampere United	Total		64	28	1	0	0	0	0	0	65	28
Hammarby	2002	Allsvenskan	16	5	–		–		2 (Note: Appearances in UEFA Champions League)	0	18	5
Hammarby	2003	Allsvenskan	24	2	–		–		–		24	2
Hammarby	Total		40	7	0	0	0	0	2	0	42	7
Tampere United	2004	Veikkausliiga	25	16	–		–		6	1	31	17
Vaduz	2004–05	Swiss Challenge League	18	5	1	0	–		–		19	5
Vaduz	2005–06	Swiss Challenge League	15	2	2	0	–		4	0	21	2
Vaduz	Total		33	7	3	0	0	0	4	0	40	7
HJK Helsinki	2006	Veikkausliiga	23	11	1	0	–		2	0	26	11
Tampere United	2007	Veikkausliiga	24	6	1	0	–		8 (Note: Appearances in UEFA Champions League and UEFA Cup)	0	33	6
Tampere United	2008	Veikkausliiga	26	2	1	0	–		4	0	31	2
Tampere United	2009	Veikkausliiga	10	1	2	0	7	2	–		19	3
Tampere United	2010	Veikkausliiga	5	0	0	0	0	0	–		5	0
Tampere United	Total		65	9	4	0	7	2	12	0	87	11
Career total			369	101	9	0	7	2	40	2	425	105

=== International ===
As of match played 19 November 2008

Finland
Year	Apps	Goals
1996	1	1
1997	0	0
1998	0	0
1999	2	1
2000	0	0
2001	1	0
2002	4	0
2003	3	0
2004	7	1
2005	1	0
2006	4	0
Total	23	3

=== International goals ===
As of match played 1 December 2004. Finland score listed first, score column indicates score after each Pohja goal.

List of international goals scored by Antti Pohja
No.	Date	Venue	Opponent	Score	Result	Competition
1	30 October 1996	Kotka Staadion, Tallinn, Estonia	Estonia	2–2	2–2	Friendly
2	5 February 1999	Paralimni Stadium, Paralimni, Cyprus	Cyprus	1–0	1–2	Friendly
3	1 December 2004	Bahrain National Stadium, Riffa, Bahrain	Bahrain	1–1	2–1	Friendly

== Honours ==
Tampere United

- Veikkausliiga: 2001, 2007
- Finnish Cup: 2007

HJK

- Finnish Cup: 2006

Vaduz

- Liechtenstein Cup: 2004–05, 2005–06

MyPa

- Finnish Cup: 1995

Individual

- Veikkausliiga top scorer: 2004
