= 2009 Kakkonen – Finnish League Division 2 =

Finnish League Division 2
- Season: 2009
- Champions: MP; FC Espoo; OPS-jp
- Promoted: Above teams
- Relegated: 9 teams

League tables for teams participating in Kakkonen, the third tier of the Finnish Soccer League system, in 2009.

== League tables ==
=== Group A ===
Pos	Team	Pld	W	D	L	GF	GA	GD	Pts	Promotion or relegation
1	MP (C, P)	26	16	5	5	51	25	+26	53	Promotion to Ykkönen
2	IF Gnistan	26	13	7	6	41	23	+18	46	
3	KäPa	26	13	7	6	49	32	+17	46	
4	Warkaus JK	26	14	4	8	49	41	+8	46	
5	PK Keski-Uusimaa	26	10	8	8	56	36	+20	38	
6	FC Futura	26	11	5	10	55	50	+5	38	
7	HIFK	26	10	6	10	40	36	+4	36	
8	FC Kiffen	26	10	6	10	35	33	+2	36	
9	GrIFK	26	9	8	9	42	39	+3	35	
10	LPS	26	9	7	10	37	37	0	34	
11	FC Kuusankoski	26	9	7	10	35	48	−13	34	
12	KTP (R)	26	8	8	10	40	40	0	32	Relegation to Kolmonen
13	HyPS (R)	26	8	2	16	38	60	−22	26	Relegation to Kolmonen
14	Kultsu FC (R)	26	1	2	23	20	88	−68	5	Relegation to Kolmonen

(C) Champions; (P) Promoted; (R) Relegated

=== Group B ===
Pos	Team	Pld	W	D	L	GF	GA	GD	Pts	Promotion or relegation
1	FC Espoo (C, P)	26	16	7	3	43	19	+24	55	Promotion to Ykkönen
2	LoPa	26	17	3	6	41	15	+26	54	
3	Ilves	26	14	3	9	40	30	+10	45	
4	KaaPo	26	10	9	7	35	32	+3	39	
5	P-Iirot	26	10	6	10	37	32	+5	36	
6	Pallohonka	26	10	6	10	41	37	+4	36	
7	SalPa	26	10	4	12	37	38	−1	34	
8	EIF	26	9	6	11	43	43	0	33	
9	ÅIFK	26	9	5	12	43	43	0	32	
10	FC Jazz-j	26	8	8	10	29	42	−13	32	
11	Sinimustat	26	7	10	9	30	34	−4	31	
12	PP-70 (R)	26	8	4	14	31	49	−18	28	Relegation to Kolmonen
13	Närpes Kraft (R)	26	8	4	14	28	46	−18	28	Relegation to Kolmonen
14	Pirkkala JK (R)	26	6	5	15	34	52	−18	23	Relegation to Kolmonen

(C) Champions; (P) Promoted; (R) Relegated

=== Group C ===
Pos	Team	Pld	W	D	L	GF	GA	GD	Pts	Promotion or relegation
1	OPS-jp (C, P)	26	21	3	2	68	25	+43	66	Promotion to Ykkönen
2	FC OPA	26	20	3	3	82	21	+61	63	
3	FC YPA	26	18	1	7	66	34	+32	55	
4	VIFK	26	14	6	6	49	26	+23	48	
5	SJK	26	14	1	11	56	52	+4	43	
6	FCV	26	12	2	12	59	51	+8	38	
7	JBK	26	10	5	11	45	46	−1	35	
8	GBK	26	9	6	11	37	37	0	33	
9	FCJ	26	8	6	12	42	56	−14	30	
10	FC Santa Claus	26	9	2	15	52	75	−23	29	
11	PK-37	26	7	5	14	33	47	−14	26	
12	OLS (R)	26	6	6	14	41	59	−18	24	Relegation to Kolmonen
13	Norrvalla FF (R)	26	5	4	17	41	82	−41	19	Relegation to Kolmonen
14	Virkiä (R)	26	2	4	20	33	93	−60	10	Relegation to Kolmonen

(C) Champions; (P) Promoted; (R) Relegated

== References and sources ==
- Finnish FA (Suomen Palloliitto - Kakkonen 2010)
- Kakkonen (in Finnish)
