= Kaarlo Rantanen =

Finnish footballer (born 1988)

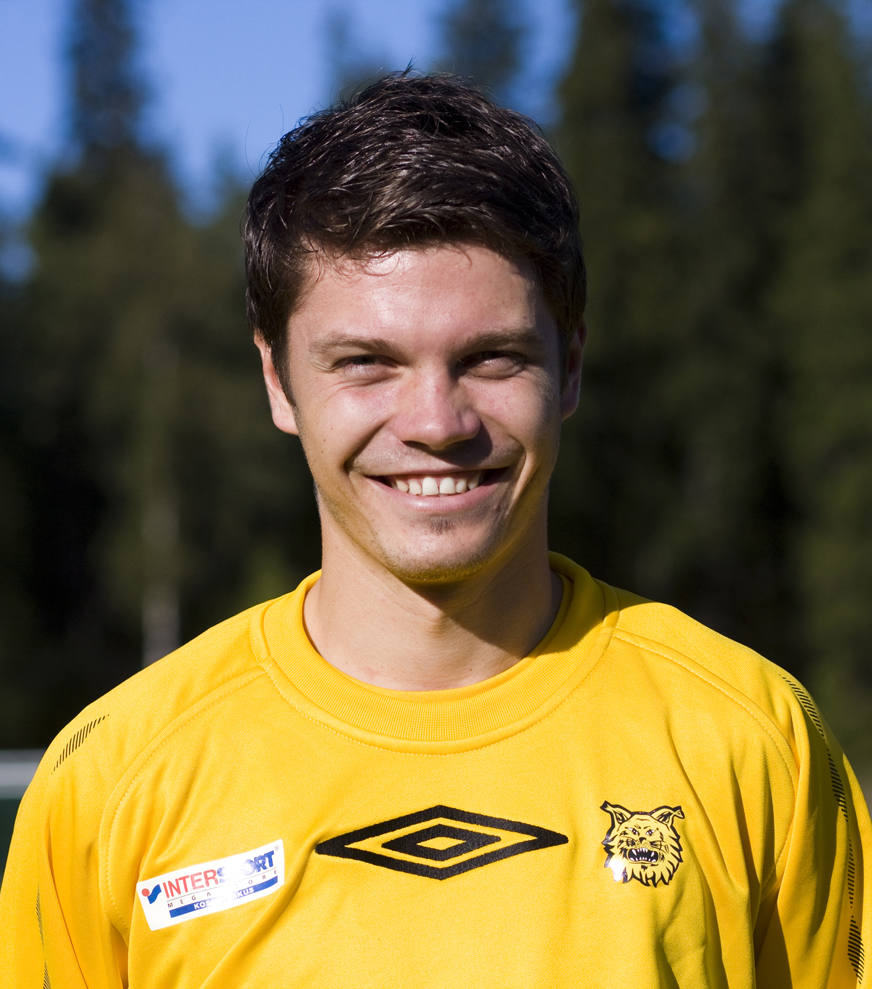
- Rantanen with Ilves in 2010

Personal information
- Full name: Kaarlo Verneri Rantanen
- Date of birth: 14 December 1988 (age 37)
- Place of birth: Tampere, Finland
- Height: 1.78 m (5 ft 10 in)
- Position: Forward

Youth career
- 1996–1997: Ilves
- 1998–2001: Orimattilan Pedot
- 2002–2007: Reipas

Senior career*
Years	Team	Apps	(Gls)
2007–2009	Lahti	19	(0)
2007–2008	→ City Stars (loan)	24	(3)
2009	→ Hämeenlinna (loan)	4	(1)
2010	Topvar Topoľčany	?	(?)
2010	Ilves	3	(0)
2011	Nõmme Kalju	16	(2)
2011	Nõmme Kalju II	2	(0)
2012	Kuusysi	22	(11)
2013–2014	Ilves	20	(2)
2015	Kuusysi	8	(0)
2015	Ilves II	5	(1)
Total		123	(20)

International career
2006	Finland U18	6	(0)
2008	Finland U20	2	(0)
- * Club domestic league appearances and goals

Kaarlo Verneri Rantanen (born 14 December 1988) is a Finnish former professional footballer who played as a forward.

== Career ==
Rantanen progressed through the youth systems of Ilves, Orimattilan Pedot and Reipas before joining Lahti in early 2007. Rantanen made his debut in the Veikkausliiga on 11 May 2007 in the match against HJK Helsinki.

He since left for Slovakia, where Rantanen signed with Topvar Topoľčany. After an unsuccessful stint, he returned to his home club Ilves. For the 2011 season, Rantanen signed with Estonian club Nõmme Kalju. He shortly returned to Ilves for the 2015 season, before retiring from football due to recurring injuries.
