= 2001 Veikkausliiga =

Veikkausliiga
- Season: 2001
- Champions: Tampere United
- Top goalscorer: Paulus Roiha, HJK Helsinki (22)

The 2001 season was the 71st completed season of Finnish Football League Championship, known as the Veikkausliiga. At the same time it was the 12th season of the Veikkausliiga.

== Overview ==
The Veikkausliiga is administered by the Finnish Football Association and the competition's 2001 season was contested by 12 teams. Tampere United won the championship and qualified for the 2002–03 UEFA Champions League qualification round, while the second and third placed teams qualified for the first qualification round of the 2002–03 UEFA Cup. The fourth placed team qualified for the UEFA Intertoto Cup 2002, while the two lowest placed teams of the competition, FC Jokerit and RoPS Rovaniemi were relegated to the Ykkönen.

== Participating clubs ==
Location of teams in 2001 Veikkausliiga

In 2001 there were 12 participants in the Veikkausliiga:

- Atlantis Helsinki - Promoted from Ykkönen
- FC Jazz Pori
- FC Lahti
- Haka Valkeakoski
- HJK Helsinki
- Inter Turku
- Jokerit Helsinki
- KuPS Kuopio - Promoted from Ykkönen
- MyPa 47 Anjalankoski
- RoPS Rovaniemi
- Tampere United
- VPS Vaasa

== League standings ==
| Pos | Team | Pld | W | D | L | GF | GA | GD | Pts | Qualification or relegation |
|---|---|---|---|---|---|---|---|---|---|---|
| 1 | Tampere United (C) | 33 | 21 | 5 | 7 | 47 | 31 | +16 | 68 | Qualification to Champions League first qualifying round |
| 2 | HJK Helsinki | 33 | 19 | 10 | 4 | 64 | 19 | +45 | 67 | Qualification to UEFA Cup qualifying round |
| 3 | MyPa Anjalankoski | 33 | 17 | 11 | 5 | 45 | 23 | +22 | 62 | Qualification to UEFA Cup qualifying round |
| 4 | Haka Valkeakoski | 33 | 14 | 10 | 9 | 44 | 29 | +15 | 52 | Qualification to Intertoto Cup first round |
| 5 | FC Inter Turku | 33 | 15 | 4 | 14 | 46 | 47 | −1 | 49 | |
| 6 | VPS Vaasa | 33 | 14 | 3 | 16 | 50 | 52 | −2 | 45 | |
| 7 | Atlantis FC (D, R) | 33 | 12 | 9 | 12 | 45 | 47 | −2 | 45 | Bankruptcy |
| 8 | KuPS Kuopio | 33 | 9 | 10 | 14 | 37 | 48 | −11 | 37 | |
| 9 | FC Lahti | 33 | 9 | 9 | 15 | 38 | 48 | −10 | 36 | |
| 10 | FC Jazz Pori | 33 | 7 | 11 | 15 | 36 | 52 | −16 | 32 | |
| 11 | FC Jokerit (R) | 33 | 7 | 7 | 19 | 31 | 56 | −25 | 28 | Qualification to relegation play-offs |
| 12 | RoPS Rovaniemi (R) | 33 | 5 | 9 | 19 | 25 | 56 | −31 | 24 | Relegation to Ykkönen |

(C) Champions; (D) Disqualified; (R) Relegated

=== Promotion/relegation playoff ===
- Jaro Pietarsaari - Jokerit Helsinki 1-1
- Jokerit Helsinki - Jaro Pietarsaari 3-4

Jaro Pietarsaari promoted, Jokerit Helsinki relegated.

== Results ==
Each team plays three times against every other team, either twice at home and once away or once at home and twice away, for a total of 33 matches played each.

=== Matches 1–22 ===
| Home \ Away | ATL | HAK | HJK | INT | JAZ | JOK | KUP | LAH | MYP | RPS | TAM | VPS |
|---|---|---|---|---|---|---|---|---|---|---|---|---|
| Atlantis | | 1–1 | 1–0 | 1–1 | 3–1 | 3–0 | 1–0 | 1–0 | 1–1 | 0–0 | 1–3 | 1–2 |
| FC Haka | 2–0 | | 1–1 | 2–2 | 1–2 | 4–1 | 2–0 | 0–1 | 0–0 | 2–0 | 0–1 | 1–0 |
| HJK Helsinki | 1–2 | 0–0 | | 2–1 | 0–0 | 4–1 | 5–0 | 1–0 | 2–0 | 2–0 | 2–2 | 2–0 |
| Inter Turku | 1–2 | 1–0 | 0–2 | | 3–1 | 3–1 | 2–2 | 1–0 | 1–1 | 4–0 | 2–4 | 1–2 |
| Jazz | 1–3 | 2–3 | 0–3 | 0–1 | | 1–3 | 0–1 | 2–2 | 0–1 | 0–0 | 0–1 | 2–2 |
| Jokerit | 0–3 | 0–1 | 1–1 | 1–0 | 3–0 | | 0–0 | 2–4 | 0–2 | 0–0 | 0–1 | 1–1 |
| KuPS | 3–1 | 0–3 | 0–0 | 1–2 | 4–0 | 0–0 | | 0–1 | 1–1 | 1–0 | 3–0 | 2–1 |
| Lahti | 1–1 | 1–2 | 2–2 | 0–2 | 2–2 | 1–3 | 2–1 | | 2–2 | 3–2 | 0–1 | 2–1 |
| MyPa | 5–2 | 3–2 | 0–0 | 2–1 | 0–0 | 3–1 | 4–0 | 1–0 | | 1–1 | 1–0 | 3–1 |
| RoPS | 4–2 | 0–4 | 0–3 | 0–1 | 1–2 | 2–1 | 2–0 | 1–1 | 1–0 | | 1–1 | 0–2 |
| Tampere United | 0–0 | 0–2 | 3–2 | 3–1 | 0–0 | 3–0 | 0–0 | 4–3 | 3–2 | 2–1 | | 2–1 |
| VPS | 2–0 | 2–0 | 0–4 | 2–1 | 0–3 | 2–3 | 1–5 | 0–1 | 2–1 | 2–1 | 2–0 | |

Legend: Blue = home team win; Yellow = draw; Red = away team win.

=== Matches 23–33 ===
| Home \ Away | ATL | HAK | HJK | INT | JAZ | JOK | KUP | LAH | MYP | RPS | TAM | VPS |
|---|---|---|---|---|---|---|---|---|---|---|---|---|
| Atlantis | | 2–0 | | 2–1 | | | 1–1 | | 0–1 | 4–0 | | |
| FC Haka | | | | 1–2 | 1–1 | 2–1 | 2–2 | | 0–0 | | | 1–1 |
| HJK Helsinki | 4–1 | 1–1 | | 4–0 | | | | 3–0 | | 1–1 | 2–0 | |
| Inter Turku | | | | | 1–0 | 1–0 | 2–3 | | 0–2 | | | 3–2 |
| Jazz | 1–1 | | 0–2 | | | | 2–2 | | 1–0 | 4–2 | | 4–2 |
| Jokerit | 3–1 | | 1–2 | | 2–2 | | | 0–1 | | | 0–3 | 0–2 |
| KuPS | | | 0–4 | | | 0–1 | | 3–1 | | 0–0 | | 2–4 |
| Lahti | 2–2 | 0–2 | | 1–2 | 1–2 | | | | | | 0–1 | |
| MyPa | | | 1–0 | | | 0–0 | 2–0 | 0–0 | | 2–0 | | 1–0 |
| RoPS | | 0–1 | | 1–2 | | 3–1 | | 1–1 | | | 0–2 | |
| Tampere United | 1–0 | 1–0 | | 2–0 | 1–0 | | 1–0 | | 1–2 | | | |
| VPS | 4–1 | | 0–2 | | | | | 0–2 | | 4–0 | 3–0 | |

Legend: Blue = home team win; Yellow = draw; Red = away team win.

== Leading scorers ==
| Rank | Player | | Club | Goals |
|---|---|---|---|---|
| 1 | Paulus Roiha | (Finland) | HJK Helsinki | 22 |
| 2 | Antti Pohja | (Finland) | Tampere United | 19 |
| 3 | Richard Teberio | (Sweden) | Inter Turku | 13 |
| 4 | Peter Sampo | (Finland) | KuPS Kuopio | 12 |
| 5 | Nikki Helenius | (Finland) | FC Lahti | 11 |

== Attendances ==
| No. | Club | Average |
|---|---|---|
| 1 | HJK | 3,818 |
| 2 | Tampere | 3,074 |
| 3 | Jokerit | 2,930 |
| 4 | KuPS | 2,558 |
| 5 | Inter Turku | 2,207 |
| 6 | VPS | 2,153 |
| 7 | MyPa | 1,860 |
| 8 | Haka | 1,780 |
| 9 | Atlantis | 1,723 |
| 10 | Lahti | 1,572 |
| 11 | RoPS | 1,526 |
| 12 | Jazz | 1,506 |
