= Mikko Lampi =

Finnish footballer (born 1952)

Mikko Lampi (born 3 June 1952) is a Finnish former footballer who played as a defender.

== Career ==
At international level, Lampi earned 16 caps for the Finland national team between 1979 and 1980.

At club level he played for Ilves-Kissat, Ilves and Sepsi-78.
