= Dawda Bah =

Gambian footballer

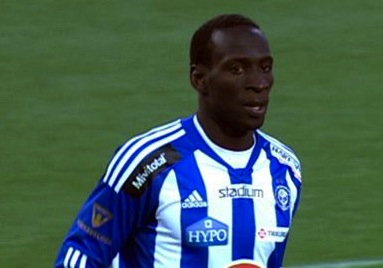
- Bah with HJK

Personal information
- Date of birth: 12 November 1983 (age 42)
- Place of birth: Banjul, Gambia
- Height: 1.87 m (6 ft 2 in)
- Position: Winger

Senior career*
| Years | Team | Apps | (Gls) |
| 2002–2005 | Banjul Hawks | | |
| 2005–2006 | KPV | 49 | (27) |
| 2007–2011 | HJK | 101 | (19) |
| 2011–2013 | FC Augsburg | 1 | (0) |
| 2013 | KuPS | 24 | (5) |
| 2014 | MYPA | 27 | (4) |
| 2015–2016 | KPV | 36 | (4) |
| Total | | 248 | (59) |

International career
| 2000–2011 | Gambia | 11 | (0) |
- * Club domestic league appearances and goals

Dawda Bah (born 12 November 1983) is a former professional footballer who played as a winger. He spent most of his professional career in Finland. Between 2000 and 2011 he earned 11 caps with the Gambia national team.

== Football career ==
Bah was born in Banjul, Gambia. He played in the Gambian League, with Banjul Hawks, until 2005, when he moved to Finnish First Division club KPV. He became a key player for the second-tier club, and was the top scorer of the division. His successful season was spotted by the Veikkausliiga clubs, but Bah stayed in Kokkola for the following season, although the Belarusian club MTZ-RIPO Minsk made a bid of €200,000, an offer which he declined. Bah also had tests with the Norwegian Odd Grenland, but did not get a contract offer. In January 2007, he visited the Algerian club USM Blida, but the clubs could not agree on the transfer fee.

Bah started the season 2007 with KPV, but moved to Helsinki when Veikkausliiga club HJK took him on a season-long loan. He made his debut in a UEFA Cup match against FC Etzella of Luxembourg, and scored a goal. Later the capital club signed him on a three-year contract. In 2009 Bah was one of the most important features in the Finnish title winning side HJK, scoring eight goals and assisting eight times in 25 league games. In 2010, Bah continued showing his importance for HJK Helsinki, both in the Finnish league and the Champions League qualifications. Due to his good performances he was given a two-year extension to his current contract on 2 September 2010. His new contract ran until 2012.

From August 2011, Bah signed a contract with FC Augsburg on a three-year deal. He suffered a bad knee injury in the early stages of his Augsburg career.

In 2018, Bah joined Cosmopolitan Soccer League team Lansdowne Yonkers FC.

== International career ==
Bah was a member of the Gambia national team. He debuted for the Scorpions in 2000 against Morocco.

== Career statistics ==
=== International ===
Appearances and goals by national team and year
| National team | Year | Apps | Goals |
|---|---|---|---|
| Gambia | 2000 | 2 | 0 |
| Gambia | 2001 | 0 | 0 |
| Gambia | 2002 | 0 | 0 |
| Gambia | 2003 | 2 | 0 |
| Gambia | 2004 | 0 | 0 |
| Gambia | 2005 | 0 | 0 |
| Gambia | 2006 | 1 | 0 |
| Gambia | 2007 | 3 | 0 |
| Gambia | 2008 | 0 | 0 |
| Gambia | 2009 | 0 | 0 |
| Gambia | 2010 | 1 | 0 |
| Gambia | 2011 | 2 | 0 |
| Total | | 11 | 0 |

== Honours ==
KPV

- Finnish Cup: runner-up 2006

HJK

- Veikkausliiga: 2009, 2010, 2011
- Finnish Cup: 2008

Individual

- Finnish First Division top scorer: 2005
