= Jarno Parikka =

Finnish footballer (born 1986)

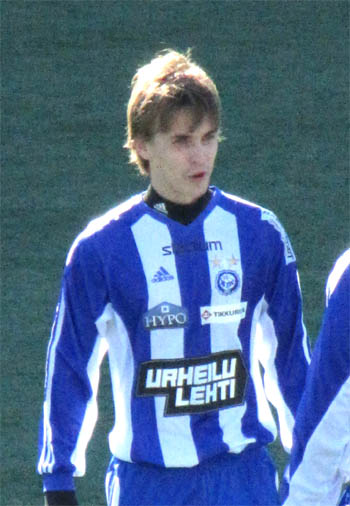

Personal information
- Date of birth: 21 July 1986 (age 40)
- Place of birth: Vantaa, Finland
- Height: 1.78 m (5 ft 10 in)
- Position: Striker

Youth career
- 1991–2000: Korson Palloseura
- 2000–2003: HJK Helsinki

Senior career*
Years	Team	Apps	(Gls)
2006–2011	HJK Helsinki	118	(22)
2012−2015	VPS	55	(13)
2016	HJK Helsinki	0	(0)
Total		173	(35)

International career^{‡}
	Finland U-21	19	(2)
2009	Finland	1	(0)
- * Club domestic league appearances and goals as of 12 February 2016 ‡ National team caps and goals as of 1 September 2011

Jarno Parikka (born 21 July, 1986) is a Finnish retired footballer who played as a striker.

Parikka was known as a striker who possessed a good footballing brain for bringing his teammates in the game, while having an undeniable eye for the goal. His preferred position in the pitch, is playing with another striker and lying in wait just behind him. He has been criticized for being somewhat of a lightweight for a striker.

== Biography ==
Parikka was born and raised in Vantaa. He is a second generation footballer, as his father Jari also played for HJK Helsinki in the 1980s. He also played ice hockey for seven years before moving to HJK and choosing football. He has also played futsal.

== Club career ==
Jarno Parikka got started with football at the age of five, when he joined Korson Palloseura in Vantaa. He joined HJK's youth squad in 2000. He had played as a midfielder for Korso, but was converted from a midfield role to striker in HJK. After three years on the youth team, Parikka made his first appearance for HJK's reserve team Klubi 04 in Kakkonen. His season was successful and in the following season, he was promoted to the first team. However, he broke his anterior crucial ligament in a pre-season match against FC Inter Turku, and the team lost the whole season in 2005.

Parikka made his first appearance for senior side at the age of nineteen, when coach Keith Armstrong let him play in the 1–2 away defeat against FC KooTeePee on 21 April, 2006. He succeeded in scoring his first goal on 28 June, 2006, in a 3–2 win against TPS.

In 2007, he made seven goals in the Finnish league cup, which is a shared record with Ari Hjelm and Aleksei Kangaskolkka. His final breakthrough came in the season 2008, when he scored 9 league goals. In the 2009 season, he is HJK's vice-captain and a regular in the starting eleven. His former Finland U-17 coach Jyrki Heliskoski has compared him to Raúl González, as he has many similarities with the Spaniard.

On 21 January, 2009, Parikka signed a new three-year deal with HJK. On 23 November, 2011, after his contract with HJK expired, it was announced that Parikka had signed a 2+1 year-contract with Vaasan Palloseura. He scored his first goal for VPS on 22 April, 2012, in a 2−1 home win over newly promoted FC Lahti.

On 16 December, 2015, HJK announced the return of Parikka to the club on a one-year contract. Less than two months later, on 12 February, 2016, Parikka announced his retirement from football after a series of knee injuries.

== International career ==
Parikka has played for his country in different national junior teams, most recently the Finland national under-21 football team. In the 2003 FIFA U-17 World Championship he played on the Finnish U-17 team and scored the equalising goal in Finland's 2–1 win against China in the opening fixture.

He was also a part of the Finnish under-21 team, that qualified for the UEFA European Under-21 Football Championship final tournament in 2009.

On 4 February, 2009, Parikka made his debut in the Finnish national team in a friendly match against Japan.

== Family ==
Parikka's father Jari is also a footballer who played for also played for HJK. His younger brother Mikko Parikka is a regular cast member of the popular prime time soap opera, Salatut elämät.

== Career statistics ==
As of match played 10 August 2014

Appearances and goals by club, season and competition
Club	Season	League			National Cup		League Cup		Continental		Other		Total	
Club	Season	Division	Apps	Goals	Apps	Goals	Apps	Goals	Apps	Goals	Apps	Goals	Apps	Goals
HJK Helsinki	2005	Veikkausliiga	0	0	0	0	4	1	-		-		4	1
HJK Helsinki	2006	Veikkausliiga	14	1	5	4	2	0	1	0	-		22	5
HJK Helsinki	2007	Veikkausliiga	24	3	4	2	8	7	4	0	-		40	12
HJK Helsinki	2008	Veikkausliiga	22	9	7	5	7	0	-		-		36	14
HJK Helsinki	2009	Veikkausliiga	24	3					2	0	-		0	0
HJK Helsinki	2010	Veikkausliiga	15	3	4	3			6	0	-		0	0
HJK Helsinki	2011	Veikkausliiga	19	3	2	1	7	5	2	1	-		30	10
HJK Helsinki	Total		118	22					15	1	-	-	0	0
VPS	2012	Veikkausliiga	26	8	2	1	7	2	-		-		35	11
VPS	2013	Veikkausliiga	18	4	1	0	6	3	-		-		25	7
VPS	2014	Veikkausliiga	11	1	1	0	1	0	2	1	-		15	2
VPS	2015	Veikkausliiga	0	0	0	0	0	0	-		-		0	0
VPS	Total		55	13	4	1	14	5	2	1	-	-	75	20
Career total			173	35					17	2	-	-		

=== International ===
Finland national team
Year	Apps	Goals
2009	1	0
Total	1	0

Statistics accurate as of match played 4 February 2009

== Honours ==
=== Club ===
HJK

- Veikkausliiga (3): 2009, 2010, 2011
- Finnish Cup (3): 2006, 2008, 2011

=== Individual ===
(Finland)

- The Most Promising Young Player: 2004
