= Hietalahti, Vaasa =

Coordinates: 63.0867210°N 21.6268819°E

Hietalahti Sandviken
- Subdivision
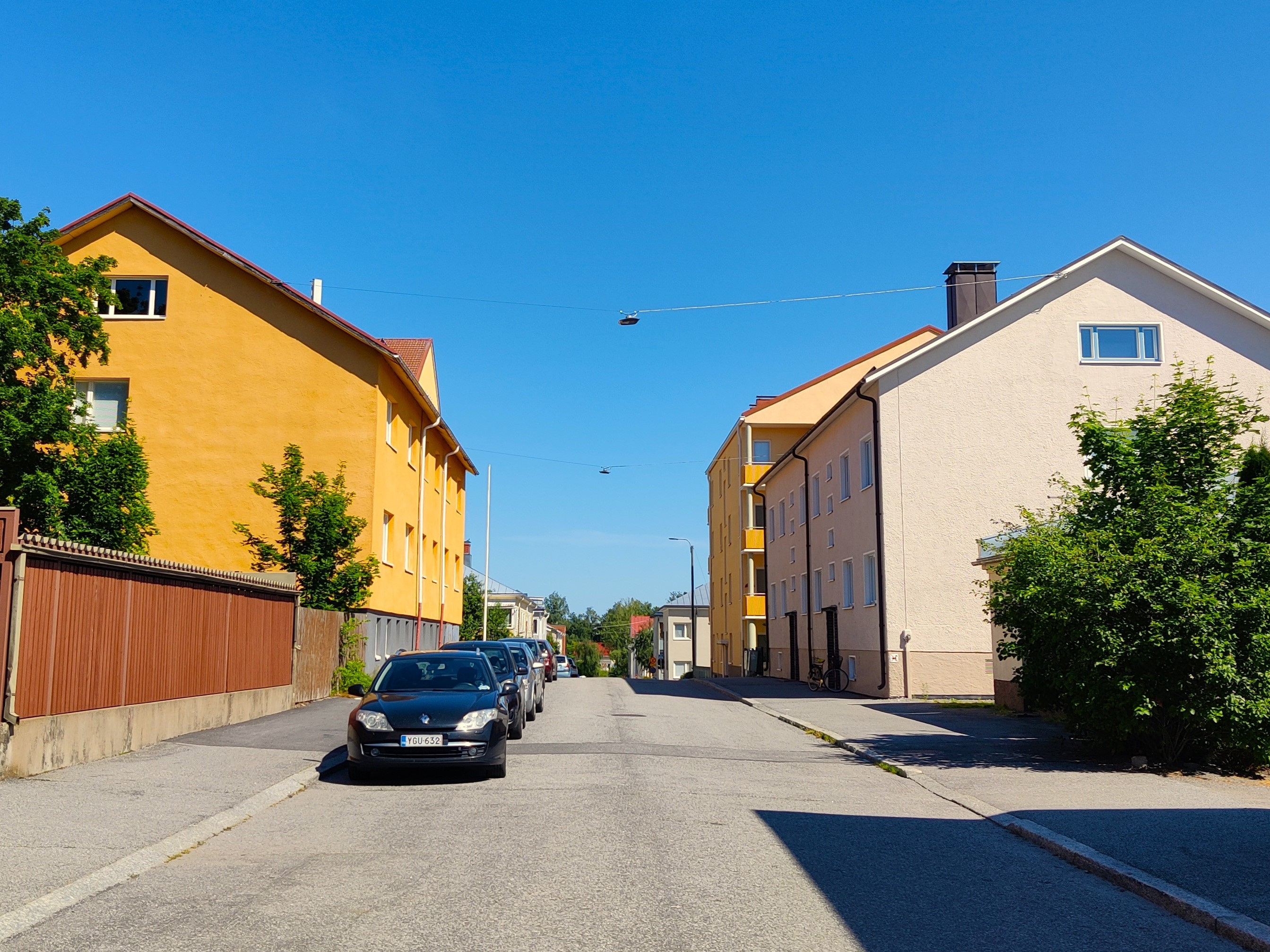
- Lastenkodinkatu street in Hietalahti, Vaasa

- Position of Hietalahti within the City of Vaasa
- Interactive map of Hietalahti
- Country: Finland
- Region: Ostrobothnia
- Sub-region: Vaasa
- Municipality: Vaasa
- Major district: Keskusta
- Population (2015): 4,855 (Note: Combined population of Hietalahti 9 (3,986) and Hietalahti 10 (869).)
- Postal codes: 65100
- Subdivision number: 09–10

Hietalahti (Swedish: Sandviken) is a neighbourhood in the city of Vaasa, Finland. The neighbourhood officially consists of two subdivisions, 9th and 10th districts, of Vaasa. It is located roughly one kilometer (0.6 mi) south from the Vaasa city centre.

Many of Vaasa's sports centers are concentrated in Hietalahti, especially in its western part, such as Hietalahti Stadium.

== History ==
Initially, settlement in Hietalahti was limited to the northern side of Tiilitehtaankatu. The southern side was not developed until the early 20th century, when people who had moved from the countryside to the city settled there. Most of them were craftsmen.

Hietalahti began to take shape in the 1920s, albeit slowly. The busiest period of construction was between the 1940s and 1960s, when most of the residential buildings were built.

== Overview ==
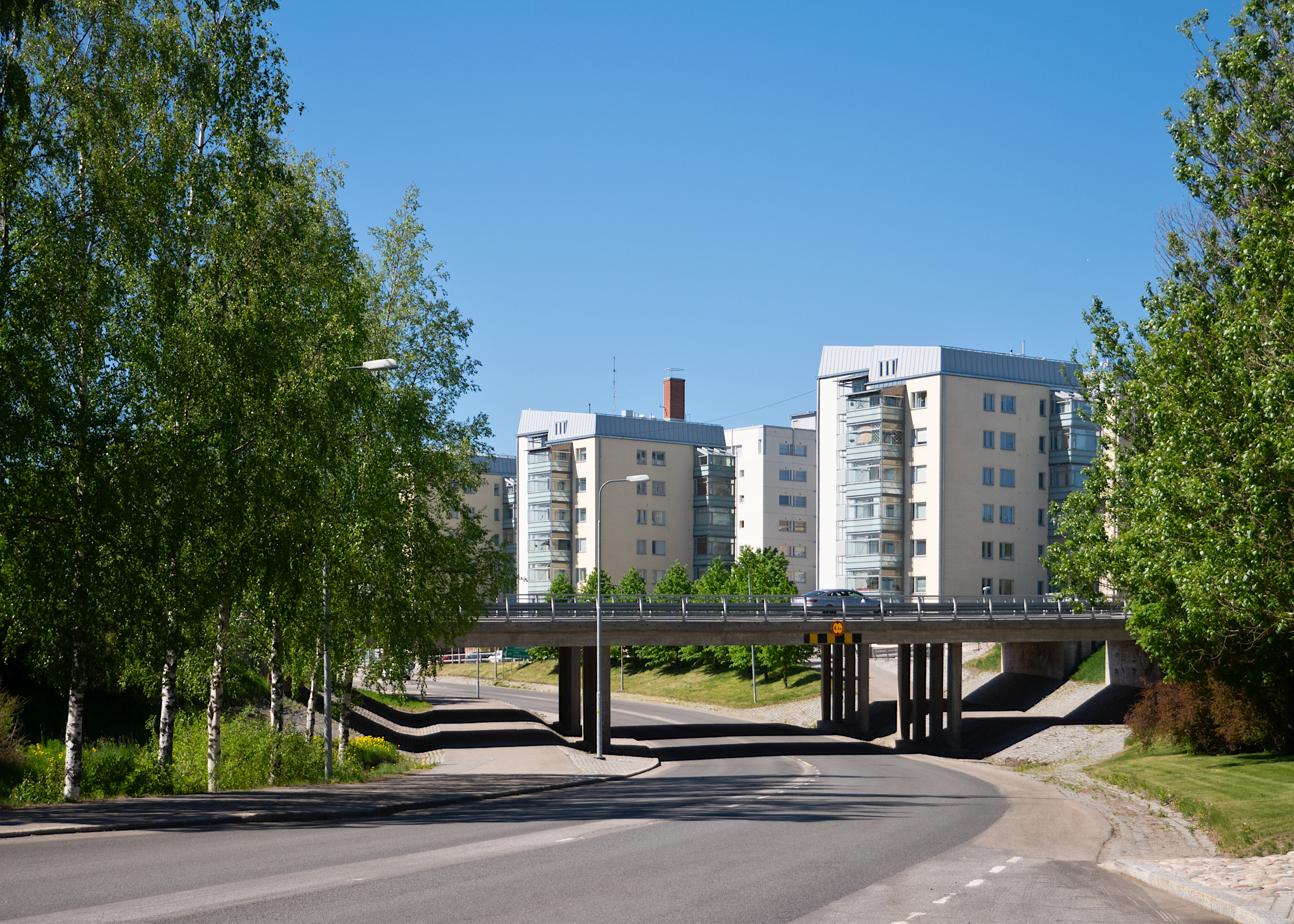
High-rise buildings on Hietalahdenkatu.

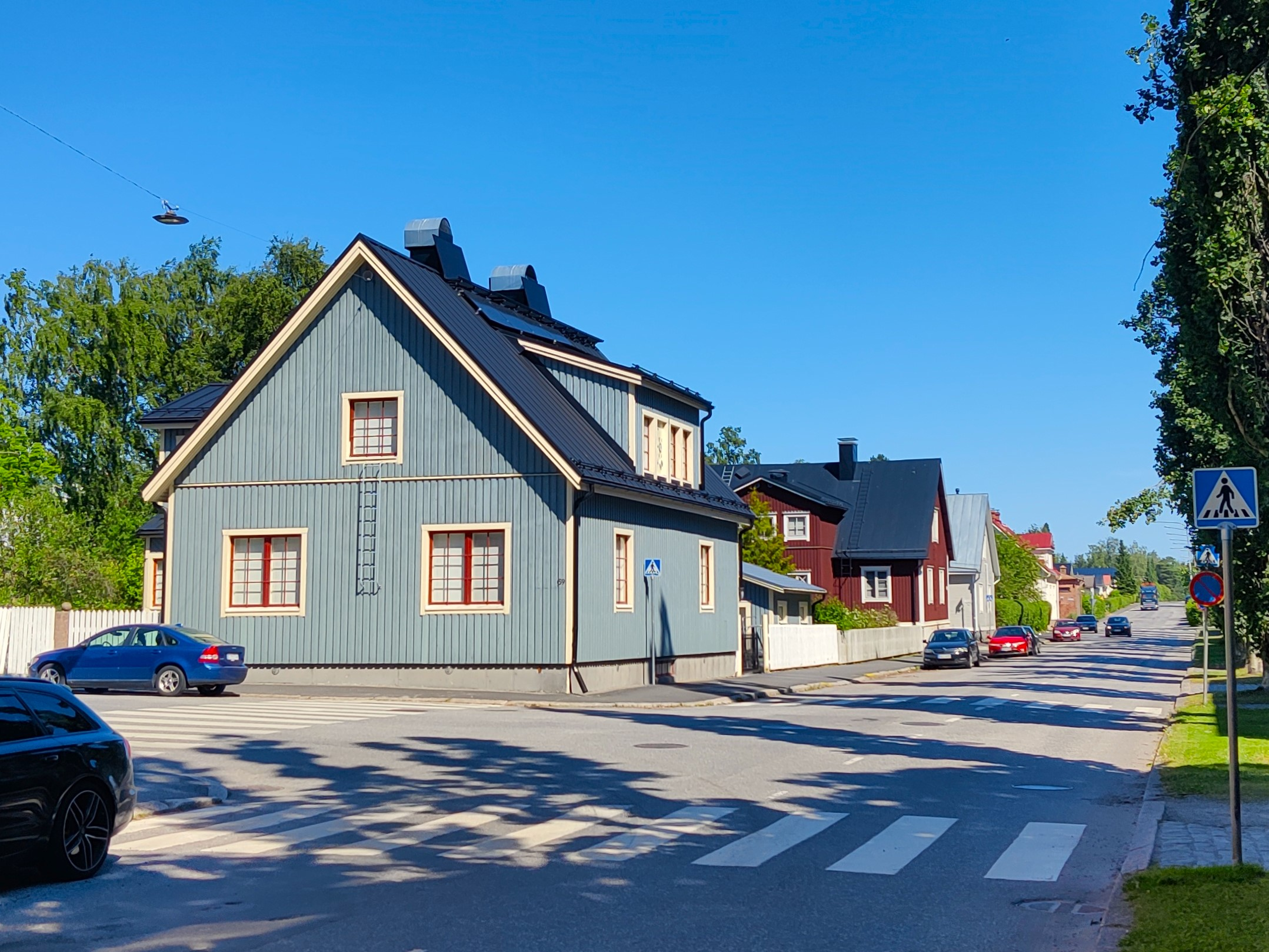
Residential buildings of the old residential block in Hietalahti.

The eastern part of Hietalahti (the 9th District) has mostly low-rise apartment buildings with four floors or less. Residential buildings in the western part (the 10th District) are taller, up to eight floors high.

Hietalahti consists of several distinct areas. The old residential block within Klemetinkatu, Asemakatu, Hietalahdenkatu and Malmönkatu streets was designed by Carl Schoultz, city architect at the time. Construction began in 1925 and the city plan was approved in 1933 when the last house had already been built. The buildings are brightly coloured, boarded log houses with gabled roofs, representing 1920s Nordic Classicism.

The so-called Malmö neighbourhood is located in the area bordered by streets of Tiilitehtaankatu, Skoonenkatu, Klemetinkatu and Kurteninkatu. Houses of the area were built in the 1940s and 1950s, some of which are gift houses from Sweden. The purpose of those single-storey wooden houses was to alleviate the housing shortage between the wars.

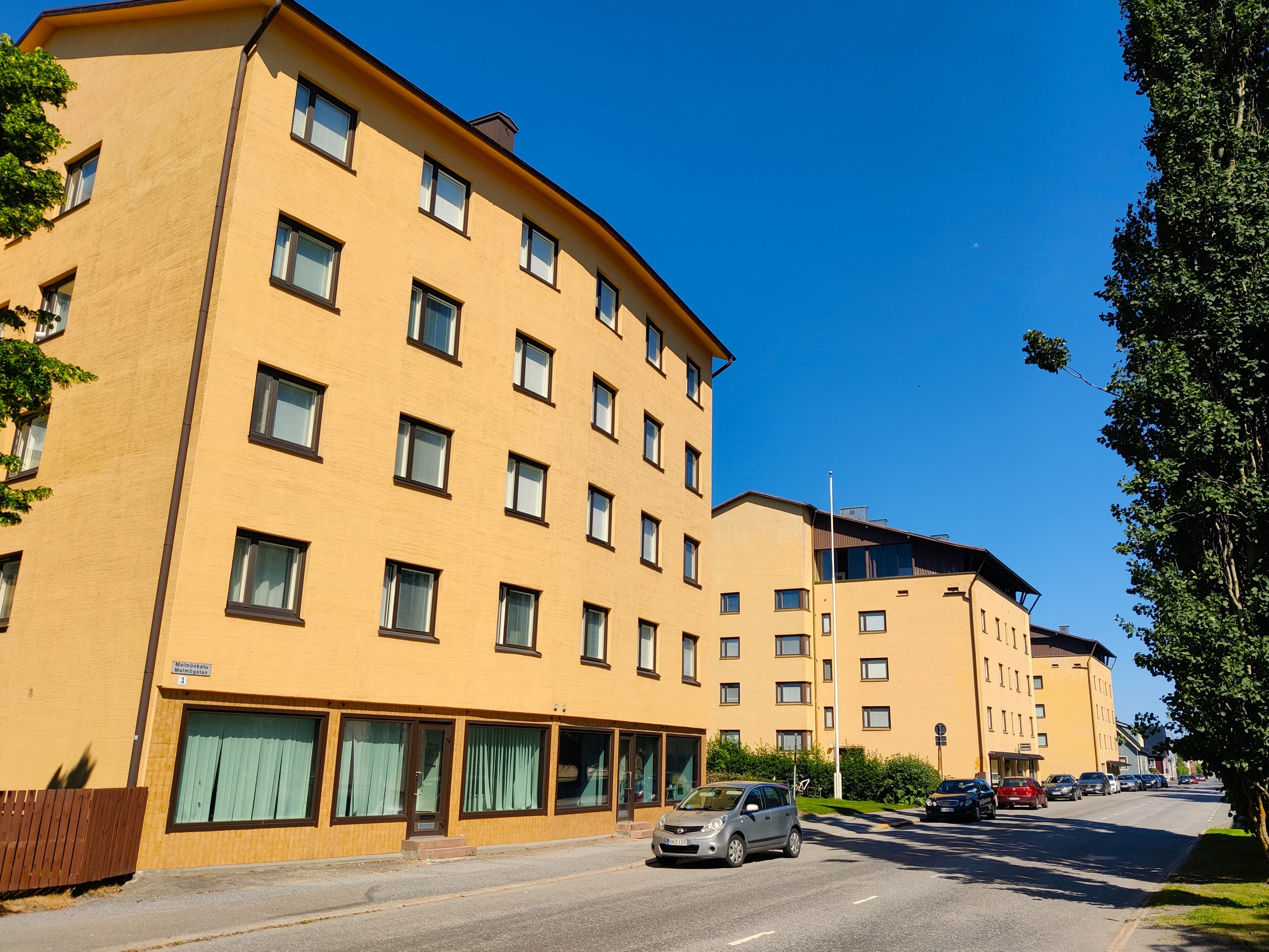
Apartment buildings designed by Viljo Revell on Malmönkatu. These buildings were originally company housing for Oy Strömberg Ab.

The Sato block was designed by architect Viljo Revell. The block is bordered by Hietalahdenkatu, Malmönkatu and Asemakatu. Most of its apartment buildings were completed in the 1950s.

The area bordered by Klemetinkatu, Hietalahdenkatu and Kauppapuistikko streets is a densely built-up area that is consistent with the cityscape of the city's eighth district, with many old wooden houses and both plastered and red-brick apartment buildings from the 1950s and 1970s.

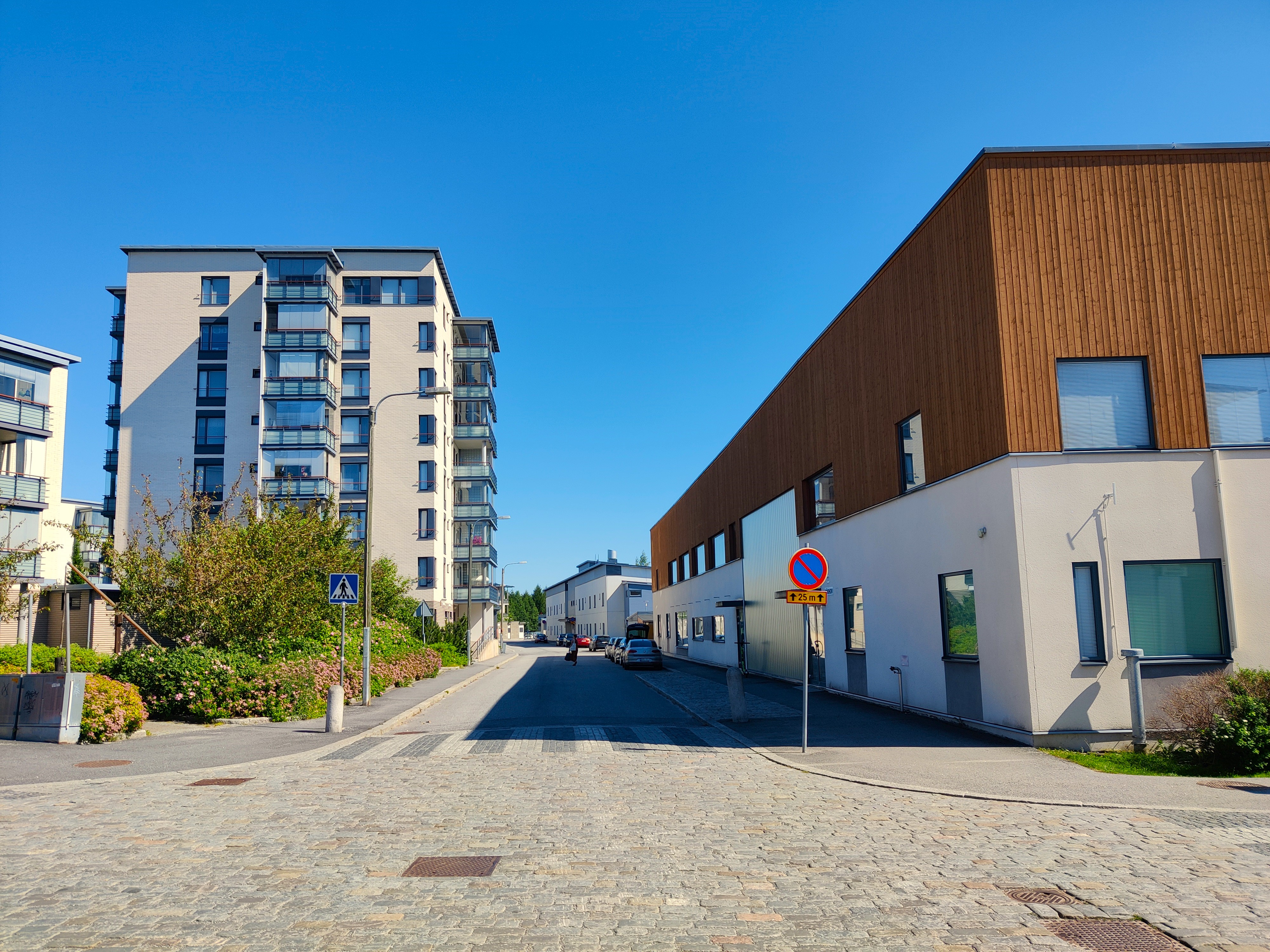
Mäkikaivo area in Hietalahti.

The Mäkikaivo area is located in the north-eastern corner of Hietalahti, a residential area built in the 1990s and 2000s.

A brand new area called Ravilaakso is being built on the site of the former horse racing track, which, according to the city's estimates, will be home to around 2,000 residents when completed.
