= Hyvinkään Palloseura =

Finnish football club

- Full name: Hyvinkään Palloseura
- Nickname(s): HyPS
- Founded: 1947; 78 years ago
- Ground: Hyvinkään Urheilupuisto, Hyvinkää, Finland
- Chairman: Sari Räikkä
- Coach: Ari Pasanen
- League: Kolmonen
Home colours

Hyvinkään Palloseura (abbreviated HyPS) is a football club from Hyvinkää, Finland. The club was formed in 1947 and its main home ground is at the Hyvinkään Urheilupuisto.

== History ==
HyPS played four seasons in the Suomensarja (Finland League), the second tier of Finnish football in 1949, 1951, 1954 and 1965. They also have had three spells covering 19 seasons in the third tier, the Kakkonen (Second Division), in 1975–77, 1987 and 1995–2009. It was a huge disappointment when they were relegated back to the Kolmonen (Third Division) at the end of the 2009 campaign after 15 consecutive years in the Kakkonen.

HyPS have had a number of outstanding players but none surpass Pertti Jantunen who played a record 327 games for the club scoring 174 goals. One of the highlights of Hyvinkää football in the 1970s and 1980s were the derby matches with local rivals, Palloiluseura Apollo, who have sadly dropped to the Vitonen in recent years.

== Season to season ==
Season	Level	Division	Section	Administration	Position	Movements
1994	Tier 4	Kolmonen (Third Division)	Section 2	Finnish FA (Suomen Pallolitto)	2nd	Promoted
1995	Tier 3	Kakkonen (Second Division)	South Group	Finnish FA (Suomen Pallolitto)	6th	
1996	Tier 3	Kakkonen (Second Division)	West Group	Finnish FA (Suomen Pallolitto)	6th	
1997	Tier 3	Kakkonen (Second Division)	East Group	Finnish FA (Suomen Pallolitto)	7th	
1998	Tier 3	Kakkonen (Second Division)	East Group	Finnish FA (Suomen Pallolitto)	4th	
1999	Tier 3	Kakkonen (Second Division)	South Group	Finnish FA (Suomen Pallolitto)	10th	Relegation Play-offs
2000	Tier 3	Kakkonen (Second Division)	South Group	Finnish FA (Suomen Pallolitto)	8th	
2001	Tier 3	Kakkonen (Second Division)	South Group	Finnish FA (Suomen Pallolitto)	9th	
2002	Tier 3	Kakkonen (Second Division)	South Group	Finnish FA (Suomen Pallolitto)	3rd	
2003	Tier 3	Kakkonen (Second Division)	South Group	Finnish FA (Suomen Pallolitto)	9th	
2004	Tier 3	Kakkonen (Second Division)	South Group	Finnish FA (Suomen Pallolitto)	6th	
2005	Tier 3	Kakkonen (Second Division)	South Group	Finnish FA (Suomen Pallolitto)	9th	
2006	Tier 3	Kakkonen (Second Division)	Group A	Finnish FA (Suomen Pallolitto)	2nd	
2007	Tier 3	Kakkonen (Second Division)	Group A	Finnish FA (Suomen Pallolitto)	9th	
2008	Tier 3	Kakkonen (Second Division)	Group A	Finnish FA (Suomen Pallolitto)	10th	
2009	Tier 3	Kakkonen (Second Division)	Group A	Finnish FA (Suomen Pallolitto)	13th	Relegated
2010	Tier 4	Kolmonen (Third Division)	Section 3	Helsinki & Uusimaa (SPL Uusimaa)	3rd	

- 15 season in Kakkonen
- 2 seasons in Kolmonen

== Club Structure ==
Hyvinkään Palloseura run a large number of teams including 2 men's teams, 2 ladies teams, 12 boys teams and 6 girls teams. The Club organises diverse activities for its young players including the popular Euroliiga (Euro League). The club is one of the largest in Finland with around 1,600 footballers

== 2010 season ==
HyPS Men's Team are competing in Section 3 (Lohko 3) of the Kolmonen administered by the Helsinki SPL and Uusimaa SPL. This is the fourth highest tier in the Finnish football system. In 2009 HyPS finished in 13th place in Group A of the Kakkonen.

HyPS 02 are participating in Section 2 (Lohko 2) of the Nelonen administered by the Uusimaa SPL. In 2009 they were promoted from Section 4 of the Vitonen.

== References and sources ==
- Official Website
- Finnish Wikipedia
- Suomen Cup
