= Warkauden Jalkapalloklubi =

Finnish football club

Warkaus JK
- Full name: Warkauden Jalkapalloklubi
- Nickname(s): valkosiivet (white wings)
- Founded: 2000
- Ground: Varkauden Keskuskenttä, Varkaus; Finland
- Chairman: Jari Räisänen
- Head Coach: Veli-Matti Mensonen
- Coach: Marko Hirvonen; Teemu Kervinen
- League: Kakkonen
- 2009: 4th – Kakkonen (Group A)
Home colours	Away colours

Warkauden Jalkapalloklubi (abbreviated Warkaus JK) is a football club from Varkaus in Finland. The club was formed in 2000 and their home ground is at the Varkauden Keskuskenttä. The men's first team currently plays in the Kakkonen (Second Division). The Chairman of Warkaus JK is Jari Räisänen.

== Background ==
The club was established in 2000 following the amalgamation of the Warkauden Pallo-35 and Varkauden Työväen Palloilijoiden clubs. The new club has now played 10 consecutive seasons in the Kakkonen (Second Division), the third tier of Finnish football from 2001 to the present day. In 2002 the club finished in top position in the West Group but failed to progress in the Promotion Play-offs.

The 2008 season has been the most successful to date for Warkaus JK with the club getting through to the quarter-finals of the Suomen Cup before going out 2–0 away to Helsingin Jalkapalloklubi. In Group A of the Kakkonen the team finished in second place, 5 points behind Klubi 04.

In 2009, Warkaus JK won the final of Työväen Urheiluliiton Cup (Workers' Sports Federation Cup) for the first time in their history.

== Season to season ==
Season	Level	Division	Section	Administration	Position	Movements
2001	Tier 3	Kakkonen (Second Division)	East Group	Finnish FA (Suomen Pallolitto)	3rd	
2002	Tier 3	Kakkonen (Second Division)	East Group	Finnish FA (Suomen Pallolitto)	1st	Play-offs
2003	Tier 3	Kakkonen (Second Division)	East Group	Finnish FA (Suomen Pallolitto)	3rd	
2004	Tier 3	Kakkonen (Second Division)	East Group	Finnish FA (Suomen Pallolitto)	5th	
2005	Tier 3	Kakkonen (Second Division)	East Group	Finnish FA (Suomen Pallolitto)	7th	
2006	Tier 3	Kakkonen (Second Division)	Group A	Finnish FA (Suomen Pallolitto)	6th	
2007	Tier 3	Kakkonen (Second Division)	Group A	Finnish FA (Suomen Pallolitto)	6th	
2008	Tier 3	Kakkonen (Second Division)	Group A	Finnish FA (Suomen Pallolitto)	2nd	
2009	Tier 3	Kakkonen (Second Division)	Group A	Finnish FA (Suomen Pallolitto)	4th	
2010	Tier 3	Kakkonen (Second Division)	Group A	Finnish FA (Suomen Pallolitto)		

- 10 seasons in Kakkonen

== Club structure ==
Warkaus JK currently has 2 men's teams. In addition there is a junior section known as WJK Juniorit which runs 8 boys teams and 4 girls teams.

== 2010 season ==
Warkaus JK Men's Team are competing in Group A (Lohko A) of the Kakkonen administered by the Football Association of Finland (Suomen Palloliitto) . This is the third highest tier in the Finnish football system. In 2009 Warkauden Jalkapalloklubi finished in fourth position in their Kakkonen section.

Warkaus JK/2 are participating in Section B (Lohko B) of the Nelonen administered by the Itä-Suomi SPL.

== References and sources ==
- Official website
- WJK Juniorit Website
- Finnish Wikipedia
- Suomen Cup
- Warkaus JK Facebook
