= 2004 Veikkausliiga =

Veikkausliiga
- Season: 2004
- Champions: Haka Valkeakoski
- Top goalscorer: Antti Pohja, Tampere United (16)

Statistics of Veikkausliiga in the 2004 season.

== Overview ==
It was contested by 14 teams, and Haka Valkeakoski won the championship.

== League table ==
Pos	Team	Pld	W	D	L	GF	GA	GD	Pts	Qualification or relegation
1	Haka (C)	26	18	5	3	54	20	+34	59	Qualification to Champions League first qualifying round
2	AC Allianssi	26	14	6	6	36	28	+8	48	Qualification to UEFA Cup first qualifying round
3	Tampere United	26	14	5	7	39	24	+15	47	Qualification to Intertoto Cup first round
4	FC Inter	26	13	5	8	42	34	+8	44	
5	TPS	26	12	6	8	36	31	+5	42	
6	HJK	26	9	12	5	42	31	+11	39	
7	FC Lahti	26	9	11	6	37	33	+4	38	
8	MYPA	26	9	8	9	33	31	+2	35	Qualification to UEFA Cup first qualifying round (Note: MYPA as winners of the 2004 Finnish Cup qualified for the first qualifying round of the 2005–06 UEFA Cup.)
9	FC KooTeePee	26	8	8	10	28	28	0	32	
10	TP-47	26	8	4	14	34	44	−10	28	
11	FF Jaro	26	8	4	14	31	43	−12	28	
12	RoPS	26	7	4	15	28	45	−17	25	
13	FC Jazz (R)	26	4	7	15	28	53	−25	19	Qualification to relegation play-offs
14	FC Hämeenlinna (R)	26	3	7	16	28	51	−23	16	Relegation to Ykkönen

Source: rsssf.com
Rules for classification: 1) points; 2) goal difference; 3) number of goals scored.
(C) Champions; (R) Relegated

=== Premier Division/Division One 2004, promotion/relegation playoff ===
- MIFK Maarianhamina - Jazz Pori 1–0
- Jazz Pori - MIFK Maarianhamina 2–2

MIFK Maarianhamina promoted, Jazz Pori relegated.

== Results ==
Home \ Away	ALL	HAK	HJK	HÄM	INT	JAR	JAZ	KTP	LAH	MYP	RPS	TAM	T47	TPS
AC Allianssi		0–0	1–0	3–1	1–0	4–0	3–1	0–0	1–2	0–3	1–0	0–0	3–2	0–0
FC Haka	2–3		3–2	1–1	4–0	2–0	1–0	4–1	2–0	4–3	1–0	0–1	4–2	1–2
HJK	0–1	0–0		3–0	0–1	2–1	4–1	3–2	2–2	0–0	2–1	0–0	1–1	3–2
FC Hämeenlinna	2–3	1–3	2–2		3–4	2–1	2–2	0–1	0–2	1–2	2–2	0–1	1–0	2–2
FC Inter	4–0	0–0	1–4	1–0		5–1	3–0	1–1	4–2	0–1	4–0	1–0	2–1	0–1
FF Jaro	1–2	0–3	2–2	1–1	1–1		3–1	3–1	2–1	1–1	1–2	0–3	3–0	1–0
FC Jazz	1–1	0–2	0–0	5–1	3–4	0–1		0–0	0–1	0–4	0–1	3–1	2–2	1–1
FC KooTeePee	0–2	0–1	2–2	1–0	0–1	2–0	1–1		1–1	2–0	3–0	0–1	2–1	3–0
FC Lahti	3–3	1–2	1–1	1–0	2–1	1–0	4–0	1–1		1–1	2–1	2–1	1–1	1–2
MyPa	0–1	0–4	1–1	3–1	1–1	2–1	2–1	1–1	0–0		1–2	1–2	2–0	1–2
RoPS	1–0	1–3	2–0	2–2	4–0	0–2	1–2	1–3	2–2	1–2		2–0	1–1	0–2
Tampere United	1–0	1–3	1–4	1–0	2–2	2–0	6–0	2–0	0–0	1–1	5–1		3–2	3–1
TP-47	1–2	1–4	1–2	2–0	0–1	0–4	3–2	1–0	3–1	2–0	3–0	1–0		1–0
TPS	3–1	0–0	2–2	2–3	2–0	3–1	1–2	1–0	2–2	1–0	1–0	0–1	3–2	

Legend: Blue = home team win; Yellow = draw; Red = away team win.

== Attendances ==
No.	Club	Average
1	TPS	3,822
2	Tampere	3,605
3	HJK	3,594
4	Inter Turku	3,493
5	Lahti	3,295
6	KooTeePee	2,814
7	Jazz	2,511
8	TP-47	2,309
9	Haka	2,165
10	Jaro	2,129
11	Allianssi	2,116
12	RoPS	1,659
13	MyPa	1,558
14	Hämeenlinna	1,527
