= FC Kuusankoski =

Finnish football club

- Full name: FC Kuusankoski
- Founded: 1996; 30 years ago
- Dissolved: 2010; 16 years ago
- Ground: Kuusankosken urheilupuisto, Kuusankoski, Kouvola, Finland
- Capacity: 4,000
- Chairman: Petteri Metiäinen
- Head Coach: Janne Pahkala
- Coach: Jyri Peltola; Joona Venäläinen; Jari Lindberg
- League: Kakkonen
- 2009: 11th – Kakkonen (Group A)
Home colours

FC Kuusankoski is a football club from Kuusankoski, Kouvola in Finland. The club was formed in 1996 and their home ground is at the Kuusankosken urheilupuisto. The men's first team currently plays in the Kakkonen (Second Division). The head coach of FC Kuusankoski is Janne Pahkala.

== Background ==
FC Kuusankoski was founded 24 October 1996 as a result of the merger of Voikkaan Pallo-Peikot and Kumu-Peikot Kuusankoski. This enabled the new club in 1997 to start in the Kakkonen.

The club has played 4 seasons in the Ykkönen (First Division), the second tier of Finnish football in the period 2001 to 2004. They also have had two spells in the third tier, the Kakkonen (Second Division), from 1997 to 2000 and 2005 to the present day.

FC Kuusankoski is the junior club of the Kumu Junior Team. Kuusankosken Kumu played in the Veikkausliiga, the Finnish Premier league, for one season in 1990.

== Season to season ==
Season	Level	Division	Section	Administration	Position	Movements
2000	Tier 3	Kakkonen (Second Division)	East Group	Finnish FA (Suomen Pallolitto)	1st	Promoted
2001	Tier 2	Ykkönen (First Division)	South Group	Finnish FA (Suomen Pallolitto)	7th	
2002	Tier 2	Ykkönen (First Division)	South Group	Finnish FA (Suomen Pallolitto)	5th	Relegation Group – 4th
2003	Tier 2	Ykkönen (First Division)		Finnish FA (Suomen Pallolitto)	12th	
2004	Tier 2	Ykkönen (First Division)		Finnish FA (Suomen Pallolitto)	13th	Relegated
2005	Tier 3	Kakkonen (Second Division)	East Group	Finnish FA (Suomen Pallolitto)	3rd	
2006	Tier 3	Kakkonen (Second Division)	Group A	Finnish FA (Suomen Pallolitto)	11th	
2007	Tier 3	Kakkonen (Second Division)	Group A	Finnish FA (Suomen Pallolitto)	2nd	
2008	Tier 3	Kakkonen (Second Division)	Group A	Finnish FA (Suomen Pallolitto)	3rd'	
2009	Tier 3	Kakkonen (Second Division)	Group A	Finnish FA (Suomen Pallolitto)	11th	
2010	Tier 3	Kakkonen (Second Division)	Group A	Finnish FA (Suomen Pallolitto)		

- 4 seasons in Ykkönen
- 7 seasons in Kakkonen

== Club Structure ==
FC Kuusankoski run a number of teams including 1 men's teams, 1 ladies team, 1 boys team and 1 girls team.

== 2010 season ==
FC Kuusankoski Men's Team are competing in Group A (Lohko A) of the Kakkonen administered by the Football Association of Finland (Suomen Palloliitto) . This is the third highest tier in the Finnish football system. In 2009 FC Kuusankoski finished in eleventh position in their Kakkonen section.

== References and sources ==
- Official Website
- Finnish Wikipedia
- Suomen Cup
- FC Kuusankoski Facebook
