= 2012 Veikkausliiga =

Veikkausliiga
- Season: 2012
- Champions: HJK; 9th Veikkausliiga title 25th Finnish title
- Relegated: Haka
- Champions League: HJK
- Europa League: FC Honka; Inter Turku; TPS
- Matches: 198
- Goals: 535 (2.7 per match)
- Top goalscorer: Irakli Sirbiladze (17 goals)
- Biggest home win: TPS 9–2 Haka (22 August)
- Biggest away win: KuPS 0–6 FC Inter (22 July)
- Highest scoring: TPS 9–2 Haka (22 August)

The 2012 Veikkausliiga is the 82nd season of top-tier football in Finland. It began on 15 April 2012 and ended on 27 October 2012. HJK Helsinki were the defending champions and successfully defended their title.

== Teams ==
RoPS were relegated to Ykkönen after finishing at the bottom of the 2011 season. Their place was taken by Ykkönen champions FC Lahti.

=== Team summaries ===
Location of teams in 2012 Veikkausliiga

Club	Location	Stadium	Capacity	Manager	Captain
FC Honka	Espoo	Tapiolan Urheilupuisto	6,000	(Finland) Mika Lehkosuo	(Finland) Tapio Heikkilä
FC Inter	Turku	Veritas Stadion^{1}	10,000	(Netherlands) Job Dragtsma	(Finland) Henri Lehtonen
FC Lahti	Lahti	Lahden Stadion	15,000	(Finland) Tommi Kautonen	(Finland) Mikko Hauhia
FF Jaro	Jakobstad	Jakobstads Centralplan	5,000	(Finland) (Russia) Alexei Eremenko Sr.	(Finland) Heikki Aho
Haka	Valkeakoski	Tehtaan kenttä	3,516	(Finland) Juha Malinen	(Republic of Ireland) Shane Robinson
HJK	Helsinki	Sonera Stadium	10,770	(Finland) Antti Muurinen	(Finland) Ville Wallén
JJK	Jyväskylä	Harjun stadion	3,000	(Finland) Kari Martonen	(Finland) Janne Korhonen
KuPS	Kuopio	Savon Sanomat Areena	5,000	(Finland) Esa Pekonen	(Finland) Pyry Kärkkäinen
IFK Mariehamn	Mariehamn	Wiklöf Holding Arena	4,000	(Finland) Pekka Lyyski	(Finland) Jani Lyyski
MYPA	Myllykoski, Kouvola	Saviniemi	4,167	(Finland) Toni Korkeakunnas	(Finland) Tuomas Aho
TPS	Turku	Veritas Stadion^{1}	10,000	(Finland) Marko Rajamäki	(Finland) Toni Kolehmainen
VPS	Vaasa	Hietalahti Stadium	4,600	(Finland) Olli Huttunen	(Finland) Sebastian Strandvall

^{1} Paavo Nurmi Stadion until June 2012.

=== Managerial changes ===
Team	Outgoing manager	Manner of departure	Date of vacancy	Incoming manager	Date of appointment	Table
VPS	(Finland) Petri Vuorinen	End of contract	n/a	(Finland) Olli Huttunen	1 December 2011	Pre-season
Haka	(Finland) Sami Ristilä	Sacked	23 August 2012	(Finland) Asko Jussila	23 August 2012	11th
Haka	(Finland) Asko Jussila	Resigned	10 September 2012	(Finland) Juha Malinen	10 September 2012	11th

== League table ==
Pos	Team	Pld	W	D	L	GF	GA	GD	Pts	Qualification or relegation
1	HJK (C)	33	19	7	7	63	33	+30	64	Qualification to Champions League second qualifying round
2	FC Inter	33	17	7	9	57	42	+15	58	Qualification to Europa League first qualifying round (Note: IFK Mariehamn qualified for the first qualifying round of the UEFA Europa League via Fair Play rankings.)
3	TPS	33	16	6	11	55	33	+22	54	Qualification to Europa League first qualifying round
4	IFK Mariehamn	33	13	12	8	50	43	+7	51	Qualification to Europa League first qualifying round
5	FC Lahti	33	16	2	15	45	49	−4	50	
6	MYPA	33	13	10	10	39	33	+6	49	
7	FC Honka	33	12	7	14	37	38	−1	43	Qualification to Europa League second qualifying round (Note: FC Honka qualified for the second qualifying round of the UEFA Europa League by winning the 2012 Finnish Cup.)
8	VPS	33	12	7	14	36	38	−2	43	
9	JJK	33	12	4	17	54	65	−11	40	
10	KuPS	33	10	6	17	39	53	−14	36	
11	FF Jaro	33	8	9	16	28	51	−23	33	
12	Haka (R)	33	9	5	19	32	57	−25	32	Relegation to Ykkönen

Source: veikkausliiga.com
Rules for classification: 1) points; 2) goal difference; 3) number of goals scored.
(C) Champions; (R) Relegated

== Results ==
=== Matches 1–22 ===
Home \ Away	HON	INT	LAH	JAR	HAK	HJK	JJK	KPS	MAR	MYP	TPS	VPS
FC Honka		2–1	3–2	2–0	2–2	1–0	0–2	1–0	2–2	2–1	0–2	1–1
FC Inter	2–1		2–0	1–1	4–1	2–0	2–1	2–1	0–3	2–0	3–3	1–1
FC Lahti	2–1	0–5		0–2	1–0	3–0	2–1	2–1	2–0	0–0	2–0	1–0
FF Jaro	0–1	0–1	0–2		1–0	2–2	0–3	1–0	0–3	1–0	0–1	0–0
Haka	2–1	0–2	0–3	4–1		0–1	3–1	0–2	0–2	3–1	1–0	0–1
HJK	3–0	2–1	2–0	4–1	1–0		2–0	2–0	3–1	1–1	0–0	3–3
JJK	0–1	0–0	2–1	1–1	1–4	0–3		1–5	5–2	0–3	2–1	0–2
KuPS	0–2	0–6	1–2	1–0	3–0	0–3	2–2		2–0	1–2	1–1	0–3
IFK Mariehamn	0–0	2–1	2–0	2–0	1–0	2–0	3–3	1–1		0–0	2–1	0–0
MYPA	0–0	4–0	3–1	2–0	3–1	1–0	0–1	1–1	2–1		1–1	1–0
TPS	2–1	4–1	4–0	2–3	2–0	3–1	2–3	3–0	1–1	0–1		1–0
VPS	2–0	0–2	2–1	1–1	2–1	1–0	2–0	0–1	1–2	2–0	1–3	

Source: veikkausliiga.com
Legend: Blue = home team win; Yellow = draw; Red = away team win.

=== Matches 23–33 ===
Home \ Away	HON	INT	LAH	JAR	HAK	HJK	JJK	KPS	MAR	MYP	TPS	VPS
FC Honka		3–0					3–0	2–1		1–1	0–1	1–2
FC Inter				3–1			3–2	1–4	1–0		0–0	2–0
FC Lahti	3–2	4–3			0–1					3–1	1–0	
FF Jaro	1–0		2–1					1–1	3–3	0–3		
Haka	1–0	1–2		0–0		2–2			1–1			
HJK	1–0	1–1	2–0	0–0				4–1	5–1			
JJK			3–1	4–2	5–0	3–6			3–2			1–2
KuPS			1–0		1–1		2–3			2–0	1–3	2–1
IFK Mariehamn	1–1		2–2					2–0		2–2	1–0	
MYPA		0–0			1–0	1–4	2–1					1–1
TPS				1–2	9–2	1–2	1–0			1–0		1–0
VPS			1–3	2–1	0–1	1–3			1–3			

Source: veikkausliiga.com
Legend: Blue = home team win; Yellow = draw; Red = away team win.

== Statistics ==
Updated to games played on 27 October 2012.

=== Top scorers ===
Source: veikkausliiga.com (in Finnish)

Rank	Player	Club	Goals
1	(Georgia (country)) Irakli Sirbiladze	FC Inter	17
2	(Finland) Aleksei Kangaskolkka	IFK Mariehamn	16
3	(Jamaica) Steven Morrissey	VPS	15
4	(Finland) Pekka Sihvola	MYPA	14
5	(Hungary) Tamás Gruborovics	JJK	12
5	(Finland) Mika Ojala	FC Inter	12
5	(The Gambia) Demba Savage	HJK	12
8	(Finland) Joel Pohjanpalo	HJK	11
8	(Finland) Aleksi Ristola	TPS	11
10	(Finland) Mikko Innanen	JJK	10
10	(Finland) Juho Mäkelä	HJK	10
10	(Finland) Tim Väyrynen	FC Honka	10
10	(Nigeria) Babatunde Wusu	JJK	10
14	(Finland) Petteri Forsell	IFK Mariehamn	9
15	(Nigeria) Dennis Okaru	TPS	8
15	(Finland) Jarno Parikka	VPS	8
15	(Finland) Akseli Pelvas	HJK	8
15	(Republic of Ireland) Shane Robinson	Haka	8
15	(Finland) Jussi Vasara	FC Honka	8
15	(Finland) Mika Ääritalo	TPS	8
21	5 players		7
26	4 players		6
30	8 players		5
38	14 players		4
52	11 players		3
63	27 players		2
90	65 players		1

== Monthly awards ==
Month	Coach of the Month	Player of the Month
April	(Finland) Toni Korkeakunnas (MYPA)	(Finland) Magnus Bahne (FC Inter)
May	(Finland) Pekka Lyyski (IFK Mariehamn)	(Hungary) Tamás Gruborovics (JJK)
June	(Finland) (Russia) Alexei Eremenko Sr. (FF Jaro)	(Finland) Sampo Koskinen (FC Honka)
July	(Finland) Marko Rajamäki (TPS)	(Finland) Petteri Forsell (IFK Mariehamn)
August	(Finland) Toni Korkeakunnas (MYPA)	(Finland) Pekka Sihvola (MYPA)
September	(Finland) Tommi Kautonen (FC Lahti)	(Georgia (country)) Irakli Sirbiladze (FC Inter)
October	(Finland) Antti Muurinen (HJK)	(Finland) Rasmus Schüller (HJK)

== Annual awards ==
Source: Pelipaikkojen parhaat 2012 nimetty (in Finnish)

Position	Player
Best Goalkeeper	(Finland) Henrik Moisander (TPS)
Best Defender	(Finland) Jarkko Hurme (TPS)
Best Midfielder	(Finland) Mika Ojala (FC Inter)
Best Striker	(Georgia (country)) Irakli Sirbiladze (FC Inter)
Best Manager	(Finland) Toni Korkeakunnas (MYPA)

== Attendances ==
No.	Club	Average
1	HJK	3,758
2	TPS	3,043
3	JJK	2,566
4	Inter Turku	2,332
5	VPS	2,263
6	Honka	1,635
7	KuPS	1,575
8	Jaro	1,492
9	Lahti	1,471
10	Haka	1,392
11	MyPa	1,374
12	Mariehamn	1,370

== See also ==
- 2012 Finnish Cup
- 2012 Finnish League Cup
- 2012 Ykkönen
- 2012 Kakkonen
