= 2015 Veikkausliiga =

Veikkausliiga
- Season: 2015
- Champions: SJK; 1st Veikkausliiga title
- Relegated: FF Jaro; KTP
- Champions League: SJK
- Europa League: RoPS; HJK; IFK Mariehamn
- Matches: 198
- Goals: 448 (2.26 per match)
- Top goalscorer: Aleksandr Kokko (17 goals)
- Biggest home win: SJK 5–0 KuPS (11 May)
- Biggest away win: RoPS 0–4 FC Inter (23 April)
- Highest scoring: IFK Mariehamn 4–3 FF Jaro (19 July)
- Highest attendance: 10,521; HJK Helsinki 1-1 HIFK (6 July)
- Average attendance: 2,574

The 2015 Veikkausliiga was the 85th season of top-tier football in Finland. HJK Helsinki were the defending champions. The season was won by SJK, ending HJK's record streak of six straight titles.

== Teams ==
TPS were relegated to Ykkönen after finishing at the bottom of the 2014 season. Their place was taken by Ykkönen champions HIFK.

FC Honka and MYPA were not given a license due to the clubs' bad economic situation. The two places were given for KTP, the runner-up of 2014 Ykkönen, and Ilves, which finished third in Ykkönen.

=== Stadia and location ===
Location of teams in 2015 Veikkausliiga

Club	Location	Stadium	Capacity
FC Inter	Turku	Veritas Stadion	10,000
FC Lahti	Lahti	Lahden kisapuisto	4,000
FF Jaro	Jakobstad	Jakobstads Centralplan	5,000
HIFK	Helsinki	Sonera Stadium	10,770
HJK	Helsinki	Sonera Stadium	10,770
IFK Mariehamn	Mariehamn	Wiklöf Holding Arena	4,000
Ilves	Tampere	Tammela Stadion	5,040
KTP	Kotka	Arto Tolsa Areena	4,780
KuPS	Kuopio	Savon Sanomat Areena	5,000
RoPS	Rovaniemi	Rovaniemen keskuskenttä	4,000
SJK	Seinäjoki	Seinäjoen keskuskenttä	3,500
VPS	Vaasa	Hietalahti Stadium	4,600

=== Personnel and kits ===
Club	Manager	Captain	Kit manufacturer	Sponsors
FC Inter	(Netherlands) Job Dragtsma	(Finland) Henri Lehtonen	Nike	Alfons Håkans
FC Lahti	(Finland) Toni Korkeakunnas	(Finland) Mikko Hauhia	Umbro	BE Group; Lahti Energia; Halton
FF Jaro	(Finland) (Russia) Alexei Eremenko Sr.	(Finland) Jonas Emet	Macron	Stadshotellet Kaupunginhotelli; Halpa-Halli; Sagafurs
HIFK	(Finland) Jani Honkavaara	(Finland) Esa Terävä	Kappa	Aktia Bank
HJK	(Finland) Mika Lehkosuo	(Finland) Markus Heikkinen	Adidas	Apu
IFK Mariehamn	(Finland) Pekka Lyyski	(Finland) Jani Lyyski	Puma	Hotell Arkipelag
Ilves	(Italy) Marco Baruffato	(Finland) Antti Hynynen	Adidas	LähiTapiola; Dextra
KTP	(Finland) Sami Ristilä	(Finland) Valeri Minkenen	Puma	Steveco; Data Group; Port of Haminakotka
KuPS	(Finland) Marko Rajamäki	(Finland) Miikka Ilo	Puma	LähiTapiola; Laitilan Wirvoitusjuomatehdas
RoPS	(Finland) Juha Malinen	(Finland) Antti Okkonen	Puma	Saraware
SJK	(Finland) Simo Valakari	(Serbia) Pavle Milosavljević	Adidas	GapCon
VPS	(Finland) Petri Vuorinen	(Finland) Ville Koskimaa	Puma	Various

=== Managerial changes ===
Team	Outgoing manager	Manner of departure	Date of vacancy	Incoming manager	Date of appointment	Table
Ilves	(Finland) Mika Malinen	End of contract	n/a	(Finland) (England) Keith Armstrong	24 October 2014	Pre-season
VPS	(Finland) Olli Huttunen	Sacked	29 June 2015	(Finland) Petri Vuorinen	29 June 2015	12th
Ilves	(Finland) (England) Keith Armstrong	Sacked	7 October 2015	(Italy) Marco Baruffato	14 October 2015	8th

== League table ==
Pos	Team	Pld	W	D	L	GF	GA	GD	Pts	Qualification or relegation
1	SJK (C)	33	18	6	9	50	22	+28	60	Qualification for the Champions League second qualifying round
2	RoPS	33	17	8	8	44	29	+15	59	Qualification for the Europa League first qualifying round
3	HJK	33	16	10	7	45	30	+15	58	Qualification for the Europa League first qualifying round
4	Inter Turku	33	13	10	10	45	34	+11	49	
5	Lahti	33	12	12	9	38	36	+2	48	
6	IFK Mariehamn	33	11	12	10	30	36	−6	45	Qualification for the Europa League first qualifying round (Note: IFK Mariehamn qualified for the UEFA Europa League first qualifying round by winning the 2015 Finnish Cup.)
7	HIFK	33	10	13	10	42	42	0	43	
8	Ilves	33	11	7	15	32	48	−16	40	
9	KuPS	33	9	11	13	32	40	−8	38	
10	VPS	33	8	9	16	36	43	−7	33	
11	KTP (R)	33	7	11	15	27	44	−17	32	Qualification for the relegation play-offs
12	Jaro (R)	33	6	11	16	27	43	−16	29	Relegation to the Ykkönen

Source: Veikkausliiga, Soccerway
Rules for classification: 1) Points; 2) Goal difference; 3) Goals scored; 4) Head-to-head points; 5) Head-to-head goal difference; 6) Head-to-head goals scored; 7) Fewer away goals allowed; 8) Home goals scored; 9) Fewer home goals allowed; 10) Play-off. (Note: Criteria 7–10 is only used if deciding Champion, teams to UEFA competitions or teams for relegation).
(C) Champions; (R) Relegated

== Results ==
=== Matches 1–22 ===
Home \ Away	INT	LAH	JAR	HIFK	HJK	MAR	ILV	KTP	KPS	RPS	SJK	VPS
FC Inter		0–2	2–0	3–1	3–0	1–1	3–1	4–1	3–1	2–0	1–1	1–1
FC Lahti	1–1		1–1	2–0	0–0	0–1	3–1	1–1	1–0	1–2	1–0	0–0
FF Jaro	0–0	1–1		0–2	1–1	1–1	3–1	0–2	1–1	1–2	0–1	2–1
HIFK	2–1	3–3	3–2		1–1	1–1	2–2	0–0	1–1	1–1	1–0	3–0
HJK	2–0	1–1	3–0	1–1		1–0	2–1	1–0	1–1	0–2	3–1	1–0
IFK Mariehamn	0–2	0–2	4–3	1–1	0–2		2–0	2–1	1–1	1–0	0–3	2–0
Ilves	1–0	2–1	1–0	1–1	1–1	1–3		0–0	1–0	0–1	0–0	1–3
KTP	4–1	0–0	1–0	1–2	1–1	0–2	1–2		0–1	0–0	0–0	3–2
KuPS	1–1	0–3	1–3	2–0	1–0	0–0	1–2	1–1		3–0	1–1	1–0
RoPS	0–4	1–2	0–0	2–0	1–3	1–1	4–1	4–0	1–0		2–0	1–0
SJK	0–1	0–0	2–0	2–0	1–2	4–0	3–0	1–0	5–0	1–0		2–0
VPS	3–0	2–0	1–2	0–2	2–2	0–1	2–3	1–1	2–2	1–1	1–3	

Source: veikkausliiga.com
Legend: Blue = home team win; Yellow = draw; Red = away team win.

=== Matches 23–33 ===
Home \ Away	INT	LAH	JAR	HIFK	HJK	MAR	ILV	KTP	KPS	RPS	SJK	VPS
FC Inter			1–0			1–1	1–2	3–0			0–2	
FC Lahti	3–1			0–5		0–0		3–2		1–4	1–0	
FF Jaro		1–1				0–0	3–0	0–0		0–1	1–0	
HIFK	2–0		0–0						1–3	1–1		0–3
HJK	0–2	1–0	4–0	1–1		4–0		2–1				
IFK Mariehamn				1–0			0–0	0–1	2–3	1–0	1–1	
Ilves		1–2		1–3	1–0			2–0	1–0			
KTP				1–0					3–1	0–4	1–3	0–0
KuPS	1–1	1–0	2–0		0–1							0–0
RoPS	1–1				2–1		0–0		2–1			2–1
SJK				4–1	3–0		2–1		1–0	0–1		3–2
VPS	0–0	3–1	2–1		1–2	1–0	1–0					

Source: veikkausliiga.com
Legend: Blue = home team win; Yellow = draw; Red = away team win.

=== Relegation play-offs ===
28 October 2015

PK-35 Vantaa	0–0	KTP
	Report

Myyrmäen jalkapallostadion, Vantaa
Attendance: 2,050
Referee: Mikko Mörö

31 October 2015

KTP	2–3	PK-35 Vantaa
Äijälä 72' (pen.); Kaivonurmi 76'	Report	García 24'; Ositashvili 39' (o.g.); Couñago 64'

Arto Tolsa Areena, Kotka
Attendance: 3,470
Referee: Ville Nevalainen

PK-35 Vantaa won 3–2 on aggregate.

== Statistics ==
=== Top scorers ===
Source: veikkausliiga.com (in Finnish)

As of 26 October 2015.

Rank	Player	Club	Goals
1	(Finland) Aleksandr Kokko	RoPS	17
2	(Finland) Juho Mäkelä	VPS	16
3	(Finland) Akseli Pelvas	SJK	14
4	(Brazil) Matheus Alves	FC Lahti	12
5	(Finland) Mika Lahtinen	Ilves	10
6	(Finland) Pekka Sihvola	HIFK	9
7	(Finland) Erfan Zeneli	HJK	8
7	(Japan) Atomu Tanaka	HJK	8
7	(The Gambia) Demba Savage	HJK	8
7	(Jamaica) Dever Orgill	IFK Mariehamn	8
7	(Finland) Roope Riski	SJK	8
12	(Finland) Toni Lehtinen	SJK	6
12	(Finland) Joni Aho	FC Inter	6
12	(Finland) Ville Salmikivi	HIFK	6
12	(The Gambia) Ousman Jallow	HJK	6
12	(Finland) Ilari Äijälä	KTP	6
12	(France) Guy Gnabouyou	FC Inter	6
18	7 players		5
25	13 players		4
38	24 players		3
62	34 players		2
96	62 players		1

== Awards ==
Month	Coach of the Month	Player of the Month
April	(Netherlands) Job Dragtsma (FC Inter)	(Finland) Vahid Hambo (FC Inter)
May	(Finland) Juha Malinen (RoPS)	(Estonia) Mihkel Aksalu (SJK)
June	(Finland) Juha Malinen (RoPS)	(Finland) Aleksandr Kokko (RoPS)
July	(Finland) Toni Korkeakunnas (FC Lahti)	(Finland) Mika Hilander (Ilves)
August	(England) Keith Armstrong (Ilves)	(Finland) Mika Hilander (Ilves)
September	(Netherlands) Job Dragtsma (FC Inter)	(Finland) Antti Okkonen (RoPS)
October	(Finland) Simo Valakari (SJK)	(Finland) Aleksandr Kokko (RoPS)

=== Annual awards ===
Award	Winner	Club
Player of the Year	(Finland) Aleksandr Kokko	RoPS
Goalkeeper of the Year	(Estonia) Mihkel Aksalu	SJK
Defender of the Year	(Nigeria) Faith Obilor	RoPS
Midfielder of the Year	(Afghanistan) Moshtagh Yaghoubi	RoPS
Striker of the Year	(Finland) Aleksandr Kokko	RoPS
Breakthrough of the Year	(Finland) Kaan Kairinen	Inter Turku
Coach of the Year	(Finland) Simo Valakari	SJK

== Attendances ==
#	Club	Average
1	HJK	5,281
2	Ilves	3,265
3	HIFK	3,080
4	SJK	2,689
5	KTP	2,565
6	Inter Turku	2,439
7	KuPS	2,332
8	RoPS	2,277
9	Lahti	2,136
10	VPS	2,096
11	Jaro	1,458
12	Mariehamn	1,303

== See also ==
- 2015 Ykkönen
- 2015 Kakkonen
