= Markku Kanerva =

Finnish footballer and manager (born 1964)

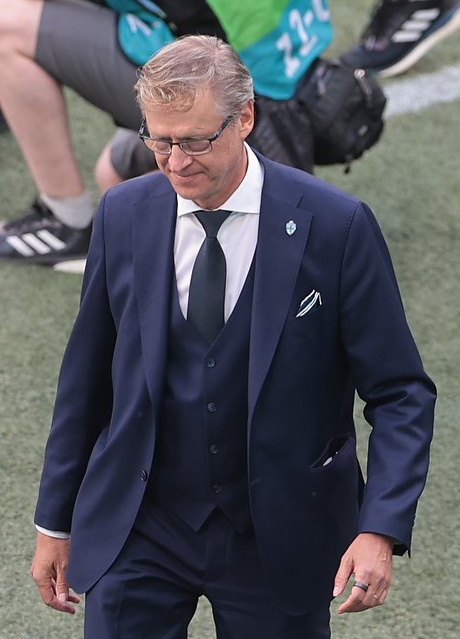
- Kanerva as manager of Finland in 2021

Personal information
- Full name: Markku Tapio Kanerva
- Date of birth: 24 May 1964 (age 62)
- Place of birth: Helsinki, Finland
- Height: 1.83 m (6 ft 0 in)
- Position: Defender

Senior career*
Years	Team	Apps	(Gls)
1983–1990	HJK	184	(26)
1991–1992	Elfsborg	44	(3)
1993	FinnPa	26	(1)
1994–1998	HJK	79	(2)
1996	→ Honka (loan)	1	(0)
Total		334	(32)

International career
1986–1995	Finland	59	(1)

Managerial career
- 2001–2002: HJK (assistant)
- 2003: Viikingit
- 2004–2010: Finland U21
- 2011–2016: Finland (assistant)
- 2016–2024: Finland
- * Club domestic league appearances and goals

Markku Tapio Kanerva (born 24 May 1964) is a Finnish football manager, former player and elementary school teacher. Most recently he served as the manager of the Finland national team.

== Playing career ==
Kanerva, who is known by the nickname "Rive", was born in Helsinki. In Finland, he played as a central defender and full back in his hometown clubs HJK Helsinki (1983–1990 and 1994–1998) and the season 1994 in the then local rivals FinnPa. The seasons 1991 and 1992, he played in the Swedish team IF Elfsborg in second-tier Superettan. His last years as a player were shadowed by injuries, but he was still an important part of the HJK defense. His playing career ended in 1998 which included the historical UEFA Champions League participation with HJK. At the Finnish top leagues Mestaruussarja and Veikkausliiga, he played total of 291 matches and scored 29 goals.

At international level, Kanerva went on to win 59 caps, and scored one goal for the Finland national team.

== Coaching career ==
Kanerva worked as a school teacher during his playing career in Sweden and in Haaga, Helsinki, but since then he has been concentrating on football coaching. In 2001 and 2002, he was an assistant coach of Jyrki Heliskoski and Keith Armstrong in his former club HJK, and in 2003 he was the head coach of the Vuosaari-based club FC Viikingit in second-tier Ykkönen.

As the head coach of Finland under-21 national team, he led the team to the 2009 UEFA Euro U21 Championship final tournament. In the same year, he was awarded the Coach of the Year in Finland.

On 29 November 2010, it was announced that Kanerva would coach the Finland senior national team for the Spring period in 2011, while the Finnish FA will be seeking for a new head coach. Mika Laurikainen took his place as the Finland U21 coach. Kanerva had another spell as caretaker manager of Finland NT in 2015. In December 2016, he was permanently appointed manager of the Finland national team on a three-year contract. In November 2019, he managed the Finland team to qualify for the UEFA Euro 2020 final tournament for the first time in the nation's history.

On 17 June 2024, the Finnish FA announced the extension of Kanerva's contract as the head coach, valid through the 2026 FIFA World Cup qualification campaign and the possible final tournament, with assistant coaches Jani Honkavaara, Teemu Tainio and Tim Sparv completing the coaching staff. After the 2024–25 UEFA Nations League B, in which Finland lost all six matches with a goal difference on 2–13, Kanerva was dismissed by the Finnish FA.

== Personal life ==
His nickname "Rive" dates back to 1970s when he was playing football with the kids in the neighbourhood in Pukinmäki, Helsinki. According to the story, he was so good at football that the older kids started to call him Rive by the former Brazilian footballer Rivellino.

Kanerva is married since 1991, currently living in Tapaninvainio, Helsinki. He has two children with his wife.

While playing for IF Elfsborg in 1991–1992 in Sweden, Kanerva also worked in a primary school in Borås as a physical education teacher.

== Career statistics ==
As of 18 May 2024

Appearances and goals by club, season and competition
Club	Season	League			Europe		Total	
Club	Season	Division	Apps	Goals	Apps	Goals	Apps	Goals
HJK	1983	Mestaruussarja	20	4	2 (Note: Includes UEFA Cup)	0	22	4
HJK	1984	Mestaruussarja	17	3	2	0	19	3
HJK	1985	Mestaruussarja	26	4	4 (Note: Includes UEFA Cup Winners' Cup)	1	30	5
HJK	1986	Mestaruussarja	22	5	2 (Note: Includes European Cup)	0	24	5
HJK	1987	Mestaruussarja	22	4	–		22	4
HJK	1988	Mestaruussarja	27	1	2	1	29	2
HJK	1989	Mestaruussarja	22	2	2	0	24	2
HJK	1990	Veikkausliiga	28	3	–		28	3
HJK	Total		184	26	14	2	198	28
Elfsborg	1991	Division 1	18	1	–		18	1
Elfsborg	1992	Division 1	26	2	–		26	2
Elfsborg	Total		44	3	–	–	44	3
FinnPa	1993	Veikkausliiga	26	1	–		26	1
HJK	1994	Veikkausliiga	19	1	2	0	21	1
HJK	1995	Veikkausliiga	23	0	4 (Note: Includes UEFA Intertoto Cup)	0	27	0
HJK	1996	Veikkausliiga	11	0	3	0	14	0
HJK	1997	Veikkausliiga	12	0	2	0	14	0
HJK	1998	Veikkausliiga	14	1	8 (Note: Includes UEFA Champions League)	0	22	1
HJK	Total		79	2	19	0	98	2
Honka (loan)	1996	Ykkönen	1	0	–		1	0
Career total			334	32	31	2	365	34

=== International goals ===
No.	Date	Venue	Opponent	Score	Result	Competition
1.	30 January 1994	Muscat, Oman	Oman	2–0	2–0	Friendly

=== Managerial ===
As of 17 November 2024

Team	From	To	Record				
Team	From	To	G	W	D	L	Win %
Viikingit	2003	2003	26	13	8	5	50.00
Finland U21	2004	2009	29	12	4	13	41.38
Finland (interim)	January 2011	December 2015	7	3	3	1	42.86
Finland	December 2016	22 November 2024	89	36	14	39	40.45
Total			151	64	29	58	42.38

== Honours ==
HJK

- Mestaruussarja: 1985, 1987, 1988
- Veikkausliiga: 1990, 1997
- Finnish Cup: 1984, 1996, 1998

Individual

- Finnish Football Manager of the Year: 2008, 2019

== Sources ==
- (in Finnish)
