= Finnish Football Manager of the Year =

Finnish Football Manager of the Year title has been awarded in Finland since 1981. The nomination is made by Finnish Football Managers' Association.

== Finnish Football Managers of the Year ==
Year	Manager	Team
1981	(Finland) Simo Syrjävaara	Finland youth national teams
1982	(Finland) Keijo Voutilainen	FC Kuusysi
1983	(Finland) Pertti Lundell	PPT Pori
1984	(Finland) Jukka Vakkila	FC Haka
1985	(Finland) Martti Kuusela	Finland national team
1986	(Finland) Keijo Voutilainen (2)	FC Kuusysi
1987	(Finland) Jyrki Heliskoski	HJK Helsinki
1988	(Finland) Tommy Lindholm	TPS Turku
1989	(Finland) Antti Muurinen	FC Kuusysi
1990	(Finland) Martti Kuusela (2)	HJK Helsinki
1991	(Finland) Hannu Touru	FF Jaro
1992	(Finland) Jari-Pekka Keurulainen	HJK Helsinki
1993	(Finland) Jussi Ristimäki	FC Jazz
1994	(Finland) Pertti Lundell (2)	TPV Tampere
1995	(Finland) Jukka Vakkila (2)	FC Haka
1996	(Finland) Juha Malinen	TPS Turku
1997	(Finland) Antti Muurinen (2)	HJK Helsinki
1998	(Finland) Antti Muurinen (3)	HJK Helsinki
1999	(England) Keith Armstrong	FC Haka
2000	(England) Keith Armstrong (2)	FC Haka
2001	(Finland) Ari Hjelm	Tampere United
2002	(Finland) Olli Huttunen	FC Haka
2003	(England) Keith Armstrong (3)	HJK Helsinki
2004	(Finland) Michael Käld	Finland women's national team
2005	(Finland) Michael Käld (2)	Finland women's national team
2006	(Finland) Ari Hjelm (2)	Tampere United
2007	(Finland) Ari Hjelm (3)	Tampere United
2008	(Finland) Markku Kanerva	Finland under-21 national team
2009	(Finland) Antti Muurinen (4)	HJK Helsinki
2010	(Finland) Antti Muurinen (5)	HJK Helsinki
2011	(Finland) Antti Muurinen (6)	HJK Helsinki
2012	(Sweden) Andrée Jeglertz	Finland women's national team
2013	(Finland) Pekka Lyyski	IFK Mariehamn
2014	(Finland) Mika Lehkosuo	HJK Helsinki
2015	(Finland) Simo Valakari	SJK Seinäjoki
2016	(Finland) Peter Lundberg / (Finland) Kari Virtanen	IFK Mariehamn
2017	(Finland) Mika Lehkosuo (2)	HJK Helsinki
2018	(Finland) Toni Koskela	RoPS
2019	(Finland) Markku Kanerva (2)	Finland national team
2020	not awarded	
2021	(Finland) Toni Koskela (2)	HJK Helsinki
2022	(Finland) Toni Koskela (3)	HJK Helsinki
2023	(Finland) Jussi Nuorela	VPS
2024	(Finland) Jani Honkavaara	KuPS

== See also ==
- Finnish Footballer of the Year
