= Ari Hjelm =

Finnish footballer and coach (born 1962)

Personal information
- Full name: Ari Juhani Hjelm
- Date of birth: 24 February 1962 (age 64)
- Place of birth: Tampere, Finland
- Height: 1.81 m (5 ft 11 in)
- Position: Forward

Team information
- Current team: Tampere United (manager)

Senior career*
| Years | Team | Apps | (Gls) |
| 1981–1988 | Ilves | 174 | (104) |
| 1988–1990 | Stuttgarter Kickers | 55 | (10) |
| 1990–1992 | Ilves | 65 | (29) |
| 1992–1993 | FC St. Pauli | 21 | (4) |
| 1993 | Ilves | 1 | (0) |
| 1993–1994 | FC St. Pauli | 27 | (3) |
| 1994 | Ilves | 18 | (6) |
| 1995–1996 | HJK Helsinki | 31 | (12) |
| Total | | 397 | (160) |

International career
| 1983–1996 | Finland | 100 | (20) |

Managerial career
- 1997: Ilves
- 1999–2000: Tampere United (assistant)
- 2001–2010: Tampere United
- * Club domestic league appearances and goals

Ari-Juhani Hjelm (born 24 February 1962) is a Finnish football coach and former player. He was the head coach of home-town club Tampere United in Finland's Veikkausliiga. Hjelm was inducted into the Finnish Football Hall of Fame in 2003.

A forward, Hjelm played in the Bundesliga for Stuttgarter Kickers in the 1988–89 season. He also played in the 2. Bundesliga for Kickers (1989–90) and FC St. Pauli (1992–94). In Finland, Hjelm represented FC Ilves (1981–88 and 1990–94) and HJK Helsinki (1995–96).

Hjelm earned 100 caps for the Finland national team. He held the record for most caps for Finland a decade, before being overtaken by Jari Litmanen in 2006. He is also the fifth highest scorer for Finland with 20 goals. Hjelm is an honorary captain of the Finnish national team.

His son Jonne Hjelm is also a former footballer.

== Career statistics ==
=== Club ===
Appearances and goals by club, season and competition
| Club | Season | League | | | Cup (Note: Includes Suomen Cup) | | Europe | | Total | |
| Club | Season | Division | Apps | Goals | Apps | Goals | Apps | Goals | Apps | Goals |
|---|---|---|---|---|---|---|---|---|---|---|
| Ilves | 1981 | Mestaruussarja | 27 | 12 | – | | – | | 27 | 12 |
| Ilves | 1982 | Mestaruussarja | 28 | 11 | – | | – | | 28 | 11 |
| Ilves | 1983 | Mestaruussarja | 23 | 14 | – | | – | | 23 | 14 |
| Ilves | 1984 | Mestaruussarja | 20 | 12 | – | | 2 (Note: Appearances in European Cup) | 0 | 22 | 12 |
| Ilves | 1985 | Mestaruussarja | 25 | 20 | – | | – | | 25 | 20 |
| Ilves | 1986 | Mestaruussarja | 21 | 11 | – | | 2 (Note: Appearances in UEFA Cup) | 1 | 23 | 12 |
| Ilves | 1987 | Mestaruussarja | 21 | 20 | – | | – | | 21 | 20 |
| Ilves | 1988 | Mestaruussarja | 9 | 4 | – | | – | | 9 | 4 |
| Ilves | Total | | 174 | 104 | 0 | 0 | 4 | 1 | 178 | 105 |
| Stuttgarter Kickers | 1988–89 | Bundesliga | 32 | 5 | 1 | 0 | – | | 33 | 5 |
| Stuttgarter Kickers | 1989–90 | 2. Bundesliga | 23 | 5 | 2 | 1 | 1 (Note: Appearances in UEFA Intertoto Cup) | 0 | 26 | 6 |
| Stuttgarter Kickers | Total | | 55 | 10 | 3 | 1 | 1 | 0 | 59 | 11 |
| Ilves | 1990 | Veikkausliiga | 5 | 2 | – | | – | | 5 | 2 |
| Ilves | 1991 | Veikkausliiga | 31 | 16 | – | | 4 (Note: Appearances in UEFA Cup Winners' Cup) | 0 | 35 | 16 |
| Ilves | 1992 | Veikkausliiga | 29 | 11 | – | | – | | 29 | 11 |
| Ilves | Total | | 65 | 29 | 0 | 0 | 4 | 0 | 69 | 29 |
| FC St. Pauli | 1992–93 | 2. Bundesliga | 21 | 4 | – | | – | | 21 | 4 |
| Ilves | 1993 | Veikkausliiga | 1 | 0 | – | | – | | 1 | 0 |
| FC St. Pauli | 1993–94 | 2. Bundesliga | 27 | 3 | – | | – | | 27 | 3 |
| Ilves | 1994 | Veikkausliiga | 18 | 6 | – | | – | | 18 | 6 |
| HJK | 1995 | Veikkausliiga | 26 | 11 | – | | 3 | 0 | 29 | 11 |
| HJK | 1996 | Veikkausliiga | 5 | 1 | – | | – | | 5 | 1 |
| HJK | Total | | 31 | 12 | 0 | 0 | 0 | 0 | 31 | 12 |
| Career total | | | 392 | 168 | 3 | 1 | 12 | 1 | 407 | 169 |

=== International ===
Scores and results list Finland's goal tally first, score column indicates score after each Hjelm goal.

List of international goals scored by Ari Hjelm
| No. | Date | Venue | Opponent | Score | Result | Competition | Ref. |
|---|---|---|---|---|---|---|---|
| 1 | 16 March 1983 | Ernst Grube Stadium, Magdeburg, Germany | East Germany | 1-3 | 1-3 | Friendly | |
| 2 | 25 May 1983 | Municipal Stadium, Białystok, Poland | Poland | 1-2 | 2-3 | 1984 Summer Olympics qualification | |
| 3 | 25 May 1983 | Municipal Stadium, Białystok, Poland | Poland | 2-2 | 2-3 | 1984 Summer Olympics qualification | |
| 4 | 31 October 1984 | Antalya Atatürk Stadium, Antalya, Turkey | Turkey | 1-0 | 2-1 | 1986 FIFA World Cup qualification | |
| 5 | 20 November 1984 | Jubail, Saudi Arabia | Saudi Arabia | 1-1 | 1-2 | Friendly | |
| 6 | 24 November 1984 | Khalifa International Stadium, Al Rayyan, Qatar | Qatar | 1-0 | 1-1 | Friendly | |
| 7 | 22 January 1986 | Estádio Dr. Magalhães Pessoa, Leiria, Portugal | Portugal | 1-0 | 1-1 | Friendly | |
| 8 | 20 August 1986 | Lahden kisapuisto, Lahti, Finland | East Germany | 1-0 | 1-0 | Friendly | |
| 9 | 10 September 1986 | Helsinki Olympic Stadium, Helsinki, Finland | Wales | 1-0 | 1-1 | UEFA Euro 1988 qualification | |
| 10 | 28 May 1987 | Helsinki Olympic Stadium, Helsinki, Finland | Brazil | 1-0 | 2-3 | Friendly | |
| 11 | 9 September 1987 | Helsinki Olympic Stadium, Helsinki, Finland | Czechoslovakia | 1-0 | 3-0 | UEFA Euro 1988 qualification | |
| 12 | 3 June 1992 | Helsinki Olympic Stadium, Helsinki, Finland | England | 1-0 | 1-2 | Friendly | |
| 13 | 7 November 1992 | El Menzah Stadium, Tunis, Tunisia | Tunisia | 1-0 | 1-1 | Friendly | |
| 14 | 13 May 1993 | Paavo Nurmi Stadium, Turku, Finland | Austria | 3-0 | 3-1 | 1994 FIFA World Cup qualification | |
| 15 | 10 November 1993 | Ramat Gan Stadium, Ramat Gan, Israel | Israel | 3-0 | 3-1\ | 1994 FIFA World Cup qualification | |
| 16 | 26 October 1994 | Kadriorg Stadium, Tallinn, Estonia | Estonia | 4-0 | 7-0 | Friendly | |
| 17 | 26 October 1994 | Kadriorg Stadium, Tallinn, Estonia | Estonia | 5-0 | 7-0 | Friendly | |
| 18 | 8 March 1995 | Stadion Za Lužánkami, Brno, Czech Republic | Czech Republic | 1-3 | 1-4 | Friendly | |
| 19 | 26 April 1995 | Svangaskarð, Toftir, Faroe Islands | Faroe Islands | 1-0 | 4-0 | UEFA Euro 1996 qualification | |
| 20 | 11 June 1995 | Helsinki Olympic Stadium, Helsinki, Finland | Greece | 2-1 | 2-1 | UEFA Euro 1996 qualification | |

== Honours ==
=== As player ===
- Veikkausliiga: 1983
- Finnish Cup: 1990, 1996
- Finnish Footballer of the Year: 1987
- UEFA awards 100 caps: 2011
- Honorary captain of the Finland national team

=== As coach ===
- Veikkausliiga: 2001, 2006, 2007
- Finnish Cup: 2007
- Finnish League Cup: 2009
- Finnish Football Manager of the Year: 2001, 2006, 2007

== See also ==
- List of men's footballers with 100 or more international caps
