= Toni Koskela =

Finnish footballer and coach (born 1983)

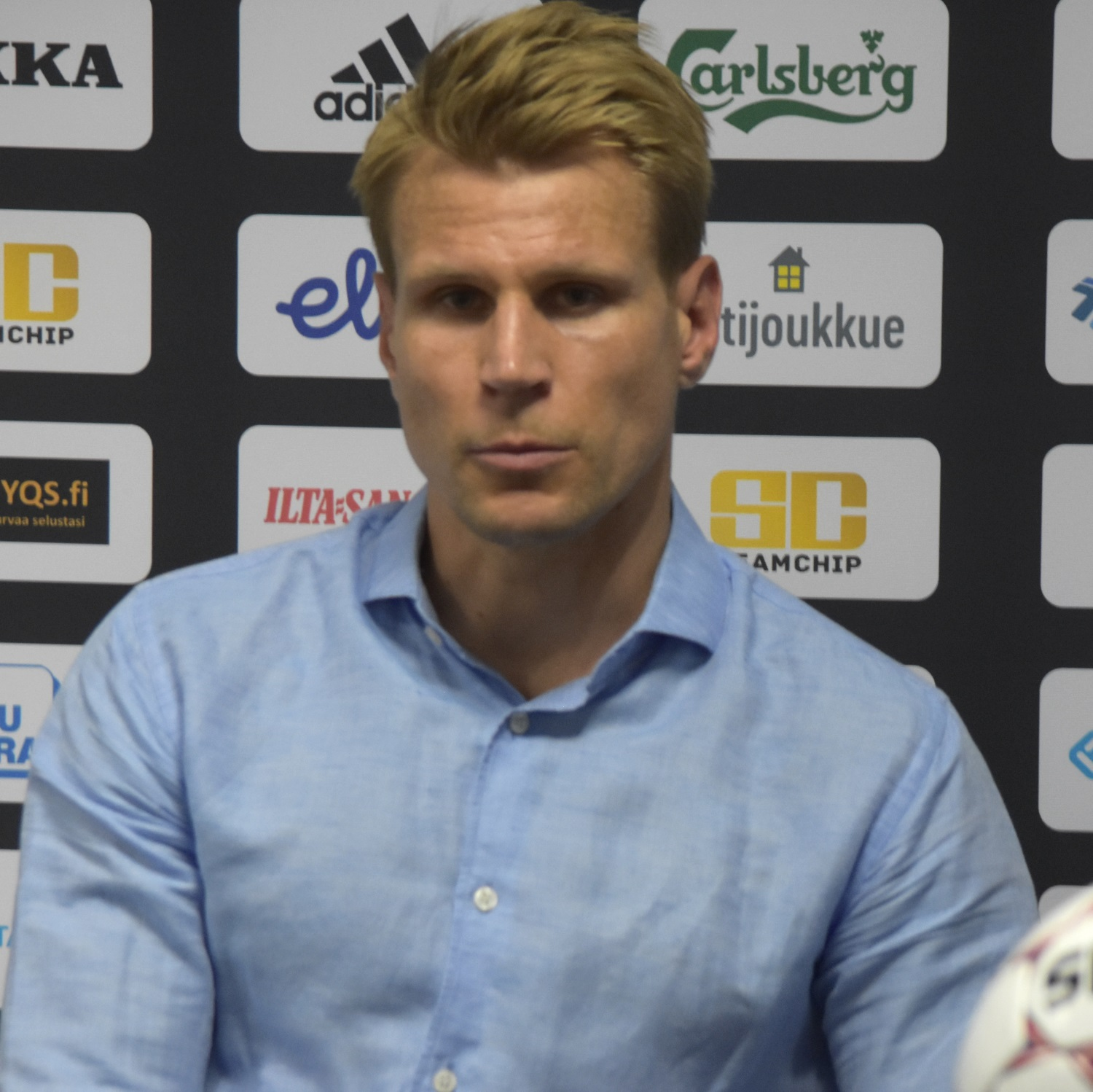
- Koskela with RoPS in 2018.

Personal information
- Full name: Toni Mikael Koskela
- Date of birth: 16 February 1983 (age 43)
- Place of birth: Helsinki, Finland
- Position: Midfielder

Team information
- Current team: Kalmar (manager)

Youth career
- Puotinkylän Valtti
- Jokerit

Senior career*
Years	Team	Apps	(Gls)
2001–2003	Jokerit	9	(1)
2003	→ Hämeenlinna (loan)	9	(0)
2004	KooTeePee	25	(4)
2005–2006	Cardiff City	2	(0)
2006	Ilisiakos	2	(0)
2006	KooTeePee	11	(2)
2007–2008	Molde	52	(4)
2009	JJK	17	(1)

International career^{‡}
2004	Finland U21	3	(0)

Managerial career
- 2013–2017: HJK (assistant)
- 2015–2017: Klubi 04
- 2018–2019: RoPS
- 2019–2023: HJK
- 2023–2024: AEL Limassol
- 2025–: Kalmar
- * Club domestic league appearances and goals ‡ National team caps and goals as of 6 January 2009

Toni Mikael Koskela (born 16 February 1983) is a Finnish football manager and former player. He is currently the manager of Allsvenskan club Kalmar FF.

Koskela had to retire from his playing career in 2009, aged 26, due to numerous knee injuries. After a short professional playing career, he has managed teams in Finland, Cyprus and Sweden. When managing HJK Helsinki, he won three Finnish championship titles.

== Playing career ==
After starting his career in Finland, Koskela was snapped up by Championship side Cardiff City but he failed to impress at the club making just three appearances in all competitions, including an FA Cup game against Arsenal. In November 2005 he was close of signing a contract with Bristol City but Cardiff did not want to let him go, so the transfer failed. Eventually he was released by the club and quickly transferred to Greek club Ilisiakos.

He has also played for FC Jokerit, FC Hämeenlinna, FC KooTeePee and JJK Jyväskylä in the Finnish Veikkausliiga, and Norwegian club Molde FK.

== International career ==
A former Finnish youth international, Koskela also represented Finland under-21 youth national team in 2004. In April 2005, Koskela and Njazi Kuqi were both temporarily suspended from the international duties by the Finnish FA, due to leaving the U21 team's hotel in Prague without permission from the head coach Markku Kanerva.

== Managerial career ==
Koskela started coaching in youth teams of PK-35 and HJK. In 2013, he started as an assistant coach of HJK first team, and since 2015 managed the club's reserve team Klubi 04 in third-tier Kakkonen. Koskela led Klubi 04 to win the Kakkonen Southern Group, but the team eventually lost in the promotion play-offs to GrIFK. At the end of the 2017 season, Koskela led Klubi 04 to win a promotion to second-tier Ykkönen.

=== RoPS ===
Koskela was named the head coach of Rovaniemen Palloseura (RoPS) ahead of the 2018 Veikkausliiga season. In his first year as a head coach in the Finnish premier division, Koskela led RoPS to win a silver medal with one of the smallest budget in the league. At the end of the season, he was awarded the Coach of the Year.

=== HJK Helsinki ===
In May 2019, he was named the new manager of HJK Helsinki following the sacking of Mika Lehkosuo. He stated that it was good to "return back home" to HJK, after signing a two-and-a-half-year deal. HJK reportedly paid RoPS a fee of €150,000 for Koskela's contract. During his first three full seasons as the head coach of HJK, Koskela led the club to three straight Veikkausliiga titles in 2020, 2021 and 2022. In addition, he managed the club to two visits in the group stages of European competitions, qualifying for the 2021–22 UEFA Europa Conference League and for the 2022–23 UEFA Europa League. He was named the Manager of the Year in the 2022 Veikkausliiga season, for the second time in his career.

HJK parted ways with Koskela on 13 July 2023, after a 1–0 win over Larne FC in the UEFA Champions League qualifiers, following a relatively poor run of overall form in domestic results.

=== AEL Limassol ===
On 15 October 2023, Koskela was named the manager of AEL Limassol in Cypriot First Division. After winning two of his three first games in charge, he received a massive amount of positive support from the fans on social media. On 22 January 2024, the club announced the termination of Koskela's contract on mutual agreement. Later Koskela revealed in Finnish media, that prior to his departure, the club had extensive financial problems to pay salaries for the players and the staff.

=== Kalmar FF ===
On 20 December 2024, Koskela was named the manager of Swedish side Kalmar on a three-year contract until the end of 2027. Koskela was selected the Superettan Manager of the Month for April 2025, after leading Kalmar FF to unbeaten run with four wins and a draw. At the end of his first season with Kalmar, they won the promotion back to Allsvenskan.

== Personal life ==
His mother is a former basketball and handball player Kristiina Koskela, and his maternal grandfather was the former referee Fjalar Åsten, who refereed in football, bandy, handball and rinkball.

== Career statistics ==
=== Club ===
As of 23 May 2024

Appearances and goals by club, season and competition
Club	Season	League			Cup (Note: Includes Suomen Cup, FA Cup and Norwegian Cup)		Europe		Total	
Club	Season	Division	Apps	Goals	Apps	Goals	Apps	Goals	Apps	Goals
Jokerit II	2000	Ykkönen	7	0	–		–		7	0
Jokerit	2001	Veikkausliiga	24	2	0	0	1 (Note: Includes UEFA Cup)	0	25	2
Jokerit	2002	Ykkönen	1	0	0	0	–		1	0
Jokerit	2003	Veikkausliiga	9	1	0	0	–		9	1
Jokerit	Total		34	3	0	0	1	0	35	3
Hämeenlinna (loan)	2003	Veikkausliiga	9	0	–		–		9	0
KooTeePee	2004	Veikkausliiga	25	4	0	0	–		25	4
Cardiff City	2004–05	Championship	2	0	0	0	–		2	0
Cardiff City	2005–06	Championship	0	0	1	0	–		1	0
Cardiff City	Total		2	0	1	0	–	–	3	0
Ilisiakos	2005–06	Football League Greece	2	0	–		–		2	0
KooTeePee	2006	Veikkausliiga	11	2	–		–		11	2
Molde	2007	1. divisjon	28	3	–		–		28	3
Molde	2008	Tippeligaen	24	1	1	0	–		25	1
Molde	Total		52	4	1	0	–	–	53	4
JJK	2009	Veikkausliiga	17	0	–		–		17	0
Career total			159	13	2	0	1	0	162	13

=== Managerial ===
As of 8 November 2026

Team	Nat	From	To	Record				
Team	Nat	From	To	P	W	D	L	W%
Klubi 04	(Finland)	1 January 2015	31 December 2017	75	39	20	16	52.00
RoPS	(Finland)	1 January 2018	22 May 2019	54	26	11	17	48.15
HJK Helsinki	(Finland)	23 May 2019	13 July 2023	174	99	36	39	56.90
AEL Limassol	(Cyprus)	15 October 2023	22 January 2024	13	4	1	8	30.77
Kalmar	(Sweden)	20 December 2024	present	66	29	16	21	43.94
Total				382	197	84	101	51.57

== Managerial honours ==
Kalmar FF

- Superettan runner-up: 2025

HJK

- Veikkausliiga: 2020, 2021, 2022
- Finnish Cup: 2020
- Finnish Cup runner-up: 2021
- Finnish League Cup: 2015, 2023

RoPS

- Veikkausliiga runner-up: 2018

Individual

- Finnish Football Manager of the Year: 2018, 2020, 2021, 2022
- Veikkausliiga Manager of the Year: 2018, 2022
- Superettan Manager of the Month: April 2025.
