= Juha Malinen =

Finnish football coach

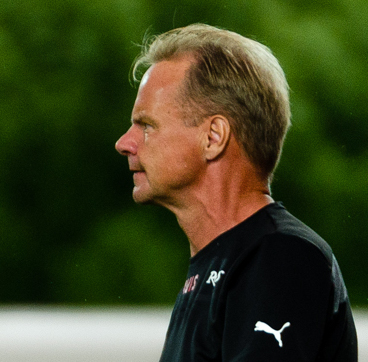
- Juha Malinen in RoPS - Asteras Tripolis match on 17 July 2014.

Personal information
- Full name: Juha Malinen
- Date of birth: 16 July 1958 (age 68)
- Place of birth: Oulu, Finland

Managerial career
- Years: Team
- 1977: Assi IF (Youth coach)
- 1982–1988: OLS (Youth coach)
- 1986–1989: Kastelli Sports Gymnasium (Head coach)
- 1987–1988: FC Pelimiehet
- 1988–1989: OLS
- 1989–1990: Rauman Pallo
- 1990–1993: Finland U15/U16
- 1992–1993: FC Oulu
- 1993–1997: TPS
- 1997–2003: MyPa
- 2004–2006: KuPS
- 2007: Shakhter Karagandy
- 2007: Kazakhstan U21
- 2008–2012: AC Oulu
- 2012: Haka
- 2013: Lahti
- 2014–2017: RoPS
- 2017–2022: Finland U21
- 2023: KTP

Juha Malinen (born 16 July 1958) is a Finnish football coach with a total of 20 seasons at the highest level. Malinen most recently managed Veikkausliiga club KTP.

== Managerial career ==
Malinen was born in Oulu. He was coming to the end of his short career as a football player in 1978 when he decided to enroll as a student at the University of Oulu Department of Education.

He started his career as a teacher just before he would have graduated, and thus didn't complete his studies. While working as a teacher he found himself yearning for a job where he could see more concretely the impact of his work. He soon became interested in football coaching.

In 1986 Malinen found a job at Kastelli Sports Gymnasium (secondary education) as the school's football coach. Among his students at Kastelli were Antti Niemi and Mika Nurmela who went on to become Finnish internationals. Ville Nylund and Aarno Turpeinen, who later became core players of top team in Finland, HJK Helsinki, were also at Kastelli. Besides coaching at Kastelli, Malinen taught sports and crafts at a nearby school for hearing-impaired persons.

The Kastelli football team was unexpectedly successful in 1989 when it qualified for the School World Championships 1989, held in Florence, Italy. Malinen's "brickwall" -tactic was a good match with inexperienced Finns, which didn't lose any games, but were still knocked out in second stage by France (Auxerre academy) with penalties. France became the champions and Kastelli finished in 5th place. It was this tournament, where Malinen first gained reputation and proved to himself that he could lead a successful career as a football manager.

After Kastelli, Malinen was hired as a manager of Rauman Pallo. During his time at Rauma, he became full-time football manager. Two players from Kastelli, Antti Niemi and Mika Nurmela followed Malinen to Rauman Pallo.

=== U15 and U16 national teams ===
In summer 1990 Malinen was made U15 and U16 national team manager by Finnish FA. He led his team in 1991 and 1992 European Championships. After about four years of coaching the national teams Malinen wanted to get back into more rapid life of club football.

=== Shows promise in Premier League ===
He returned to his hometown Oulu and FC Oulu, which. Besides being promoted, the club was hampered by financial difficulties, so Malinen went to TPS, with surprising Finnish Cup win in 1994 and bronze medal in 1996.

=== MyPa ===
In 1998 Malinen moved from the former capital of Finland to the opposite side of Finland, to MyPa and small town of Anjalankoski. Backed by the strong local forest industry magnates, Malinen was given quite free hands at combining his team. This was the first time when he had some leverage - even the TPS, one of the biggest Finnish clubs, was cash-strapped. Malinen's time at MyPa was somewhat successful (4 medals but only limited UEFA Cup success). MyPa's current manager Ilkka Mäkelä came on board during those times as an assistant manager.

=== KuPS ===
In 2004, Malinen took over as manager of KuPS, one of Finland's most traditional and successful clubs, who had just been relegated to the Ykkönen. Malinen revamped the team, bringing in experienced players from MyPa, revamping the youth system and overseeing the construction of a new stadium. KuPS won the 2004 Ykkönen, returning to the Veikkausliiga at their first attempt. With emerging talents such as Berat Sadik, Pyry Kärkkäinen, Medo and Patrick Bantamoi, KuPS won their first Finnish League Cup in 2006, but ended the year with relegation, which saw the departure of Malinen.

=== Shakhter Karagandy ===
In February 2007, Malinen was appointed as manager of Kazakhstan Premier League side Shakhter Karagandy and the Kazakhstan U-21 Team. Malinen left Shakhter Karagandy after just 7 months, but remained as the Kazakhstan U-21 manager until the end of 2007.

=== Racism controversy ===
On taking over as coach of RoPS in April 2014, Malinen courted controversy with his comments about foreign players, especially coloured players, in the team. Malinen had told newspaper Iltalehti: "We have the league's most Finnish team. ... Just a few years back RoPS had 13 black men. We've managed to put that completely behind us. We've recruited players with names that get pronounced correctly and the Finns know them." Weighing up the negative press Malinen later replied: "I get along with all nationalities."

== Media work ==
Besides his coaching career, Malinen has worked as a football commentator for Yle TV1 & Yle TV2 since 2000.

== Honours ==
KuPS

- Ykkönen: 2004
- Finnish League Cup: 2006

RoPS

- Finnish Cup: 2013

Individual

- Finnish Football Manager of the Year: 1996
- Veikkausliiga Coach of the Month: May 2015, June 2015, June 2016
