= Lepola =

Surname list

Lepola is a surname. Notable people with the surname include:

- Anton Lepola (born 1996), Finnish footballer
- Esa Lepola (born 1948), Finnish Olympic swimmer
- Jaakko Lepola (born 1990), Finnish footballer
- Liisa Lepola (born 1998), Finnish gymnast
