= Simo Syrjävaara =

Finnish football manager and former player

Personal information
- Date of birth: 14 June 1941 (age 85)
- Place of birth: Rauma, Finland
- Position: Midfielder

Senior career*
Years	Team	Apps	(Gls)
1960–1962	Rauman Pallo		(12)
1963–1965	Åbo IFK	64	(6)
1966–1968	Upon Pallo	39	(9)
1969	Reipas	18	(2)
1970–1972	FC Kuusysi	61	(9)

International career
1964–1968	Finland	25	(1)

Managerial career
- 1973–1975: Finland U23
- 1976–1978: Finland (assistant)
- 1978: Finland women
- 1979–1990: Finland U19, Finland U17
- 1999–2004: Finland national futsal team
- * Club domestic league appearances and goals

Simo Syrjävaara (born 14 June 1943) is a Finnish retired football player and manager.

Syrjävaara played 182 matches in the Finnish premier division Mestaruussarja for Åbo IFK, Upon Pallo, Reipas and FC Kuusysi. He capped 25 times for Finland national team.

After his player career Syrjävaara worked as an assistant coach for Finland national team and a head coach for Finland women's team and Finland national futsal team.

== Honors ==
=== Club ===
- Finnish Cup: 1965

=== Individual ===
- Finnish Football Manager of the Year: 1981

== International goals ==
No.	Date	Venue	Opponent	Score	Result	Competition
1.	6 September 1967	Turku, Finland	Soviet Union	2–2	2–5	UEFA Euro 1968 qualifying
