= Olli Huttunen =

Finnish footballer and coach (born 1960)

Personal information
- Full name: Olavi Huttunen
- Date of birth: 4 August 1960 (age 66)
- Place of birth: Kajaani, Finland
- Position: Goalkeeper

Team information
- Current team: Haka (CEO)

Youth career
- KaPa

Senior career*
Years	Team	Apps	(Gls)
1978–1995	FC Haka	432	(0)

International career
1980–1992	Finland	61	(0)

Managerial career
- 1998–2002: Haka (assistant)
- 2002–2009: Haka
- 2010–2011: Finland (assistant)
- 2010–2011: Finland (caretaker)
- 2010–2011: Haka (sporting director)
- 2012–2015: VPS
- 2016–: Haka (chief executive officer)
- * Club domestic league appearances and goals

Olavi "Olli" Huttunen (born 4 August 1960) is a Finnish football coach and former goalkeeper. He is the former head coach of the Finnish national team. Huttunen is currently the CEO of Veikkausliiga club Haka. Huttunen was inducted into the Finnish Football Hall of Fame in 2018

== Career ==
Considered as one of the best Finnish goalkeepers of all time, Huttunen represented Haka throughout his career. He ended up winning one Finnish championship and three Finnish Cups with the club. He earned 61 caps for Finland.

Huttunen started his coaching career as Keith Armstrong's assistant at Haka. He became Haka's head coach in 2002, and has led the club to one league championship and two cups. In 2009, Huttunen was sacked.

On 8 November 2010, he replaced Stuart Baxter as an interim head coach on Finland's national team for the match against San Marino.

On 1 September 2016, Huttunen was named the CEO of Haka.

== Career statistics ==
=== Club ===
Appearances and goals by club, season and competition
Club	Season	League			Europe		Total	
Club	Season	Division	Apps	Goals	Apps	Goals	Apps	Goals
Valkeakosken Haka	1978	Mestaruussarja	3	0	–		3	0
Valkeakosken Haka	1979	Mestaruussarja	10	0	–		10	0
Valkeakosken Haka	1980	Mestaruussarja	25	0	–		25	0
Valkeakosken Haka	1981	Mestaruussarja	29	0	2 (Note: Appearances in UEFA Cup)	0	31	0
Valkeakosken Haka	1982	Mestaruussarja	29	0	–		29	0
Valkeakosken Haka	1983	Mestaruussarja	29	0	6 (Note: Appearances in UEFA Cup Winners' Cup)	0	35	0
Valkeakosken Haka	1984	Mestaruussarja	26	0	–		26	0
Valkeakosken Haka	1985	Mestaruussarja	22	0	–		22	0
Valkeakosken Haka	1986	Mestaruussarja	22	0	2	0	24	0
Valkeakosken Haka	1987	Mestaruussarja	22	0	–		22	0
Valkeakosken Haka	1988	Mestaruussarja	28	0	–		28	0
Valkeakosken Haka	1989	Mestaruussarja	27	0	2	0	29	0
Valkeakosken Haka	1990	Veikkausliiga	24	0	–		24	0
Valkeakosken Haka	1991	Veikkausliiga	33	0	–		33	0
Valkeakosken Haka	1992	Veikkausliiga	30	0	–		30	0
Valkeakosken Haka	1993	Veikkausliiga	22	0	–		22	0
Valkeakosken Haka	1994	Veikkausliiga	24	0	–		24	0
Valkeakosken Haka	1995	Veikkausliiga	26	0	–		26	0
Valkeakosken Haka	Total		432	0	12	0	444	0
Career total			432	0	12	0	444	0

=== International ===
Appearances and goals by national team and year
National team	Year	Apps	Goals
Finland	1980	3	0
Finland	1981	4	0
Finland	1982	6	0
Finland	1983	3	0
Finland	1984	10	0
Finland	1985	6	0
Finland	1986	4	0
Finland	1987	–	
Finland	1988	5	0
Finland	1989	3	0
Finland	1990	6	0
Finland	1991	7	0
Finland	1992	4	0
Total		61	0

== Honours ==
=== As player ===
- Finnish Championship: 1995
- Finnish Cup: 1982, 1985, 1988
- Finnish Footballer of the Year: 1982, 1984

=== As assistant coach ===
- Finnish Championship: 1998, 1999, 2000
- Finnish Cup: 1997

=== As head coach ===
- Finnish Championship: 2004
- Finnish Cup: 2002, 2005

Individual

- Finnish Football Manager of the Year: 2002
- Veikkausliiga Coach of the Month: May 2009, October 2013, October 2014
- Veikkausliiga Best Coach: 2013
