= Pekka Sihvola =

Finnish footballer (born 1984)

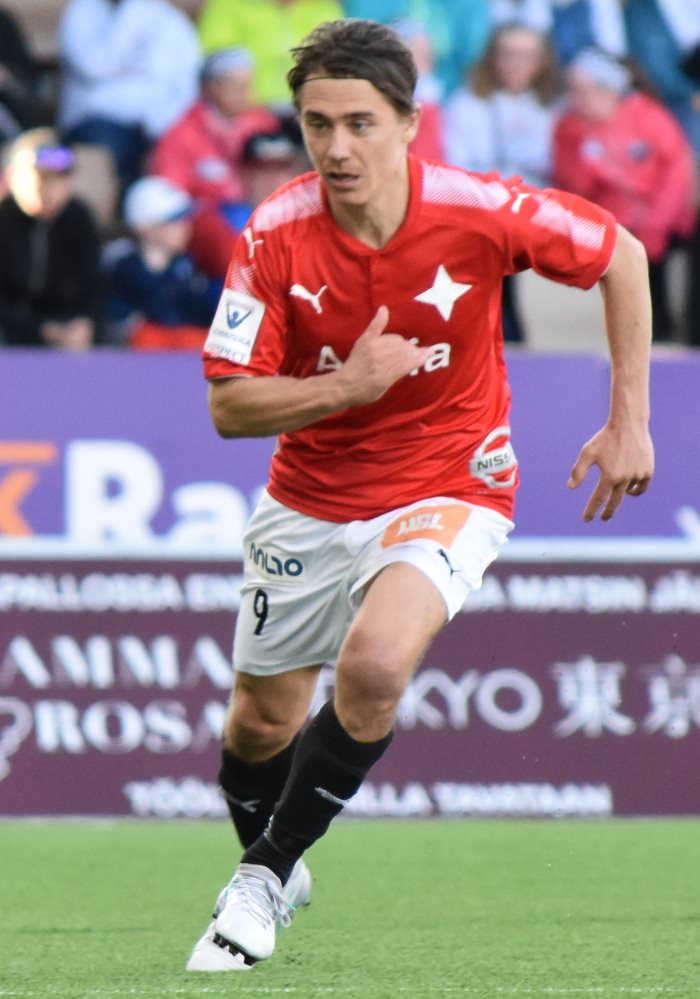

Personal information
- Full name: Pekka Sihvola
- Date of birth: 22 April 1984 (age 42)
- Place of birth: Espoo, Finland
- Height: 1.75 m (5 ft 9 in)
- Position: Striker

Senior career*
Years	Team	Apps	(Gls)
2003	Jokerit	4	(0)
2004	Klubi 04	?	(18)
2005	PK-35	?	(5)
2006	Honka	5	(0)
2006–2009	Hämeenlinna	59	(37)
2008	→ Viikingit (loan)	7	(4)
2010	Lahti	17	(2)
2011	Haka	33	(9)
2012–2014	MYPA	60	(26)
2015–2018	HIFK	114	(38)
2019	Gnistan	21	(12)
2021	PPJ	6	(5)
Total		326	(156)

International career
2014	Finland	1	(0)
- * Club domestic league appearances and goals as of 28 September 2019

Pekka Sihvola (born 22 April 1984) is a Finnish retired professional footballer who played as a forward. He previously played for FC Honka, FC Hämeenlinna, FC Lahti, Haka, MyPa and HIFK. He has also represented the Finland national football team.

In 2004 Sihvola and fellow footballer from Hämeenlinna, Panu Autio, had a trial at C.D. La Serena playing at top level of Chilean football. They also trained with C.D. Magallanes playing in the third level. They would have been the first Finnish footballers ever to play in the Chilean football league, but they were never given a professional contract and they both returned to Finland.

Sihvola is a striker with a keen eye for goal. In September 2012 Sihvola attracted world-wide fame for a training video posted online in which he scored a blindfolded Rabona penalty.

== Honours ==
=== Individual ===
- Veikkausliiga Player of the Month:August 2012, May 2013
