= Michael Käld =

Finnish football manager (born 1954)

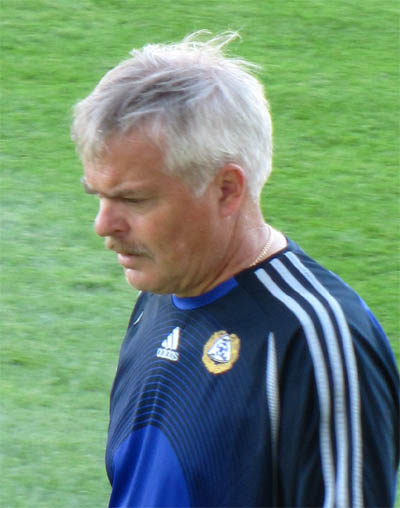
- Käld in 2009

Personal information
- Full name: Mikael Johan Bernhard Käld
- Date of birth: 6 May 1954 (age 72)
- Place of birth: Kronoby, Finland

Managerial career
- Years: Team
- 1991–1997: GBK Kokkola
- 1998–1999: NIK Nykarleby
- 2000: FC United
- 2001–2009: Finland women's national team
- 2010–2013: Kokkola F10

Mikael Johan Bernhard Käld (born 6 May 1954) is a Finnish football manager who most recently worked at Kokkola F10 in the Finnish women's premier division Kansallinen Liiga. Käld was the head coach of Finland women's national football team from 2001 to 2009.

Käld spent his own player career in the Finnish lower divisions. His debut as a women's manager Käld made in 2000 by coaching Jakobstad in Naisten Liiga (renamed Kansallainen Liiga in 2020). A year later he was named as the head coach of Finland women's team. Käld coached Finland in 2005 and 2009 UEFA Women's Championship. In 2005, Finland reached the semi-finals and 2009 the quarter-finals.

Michael Käld was nominated the Finnish Football Manager of the Year in 2004 and 2005.
