= Hannu Touru =

Finnish football manager (born 1952)

Personal information
- Date of birth: 1952 (age 73–74)
- Place of birth: Turku, Finland

Managerial career
- Years: Team
- 1986–1988: Turun Toverit
- 1989: Rauman Pallo
- 1990–1993: FF Jaro
- 1995: Mikkelin Palloilijat
- 1996–1998: Vaasan Palloseura
- 1999–2000: FC KooTeePee
- 2001–2002: FC Hämeenlinna
- 2004–2005: FF Jaro
- 2006: FF Jaro
- 2007: KPV
- 2011–2012: Turun Toverit
- 2014–: Pallo-Iirot

Hannu Touru (born 1952) is a Finnish football manager. In 1991, Touru was elected as the manager of the year by the Finnish Football Association. He still remains the highest achieving manager in the history of FF Jaro, where he has coached during three spells and seven seasons.

Touru has an education as an electrical engineer however he has not practised the trade since he became a professional manager at the age of 37.

== Honours ==
Individual

- Finnish Football Manager of the Year: 1991
