= Irakli Sirbiladze =

Georgian footballer

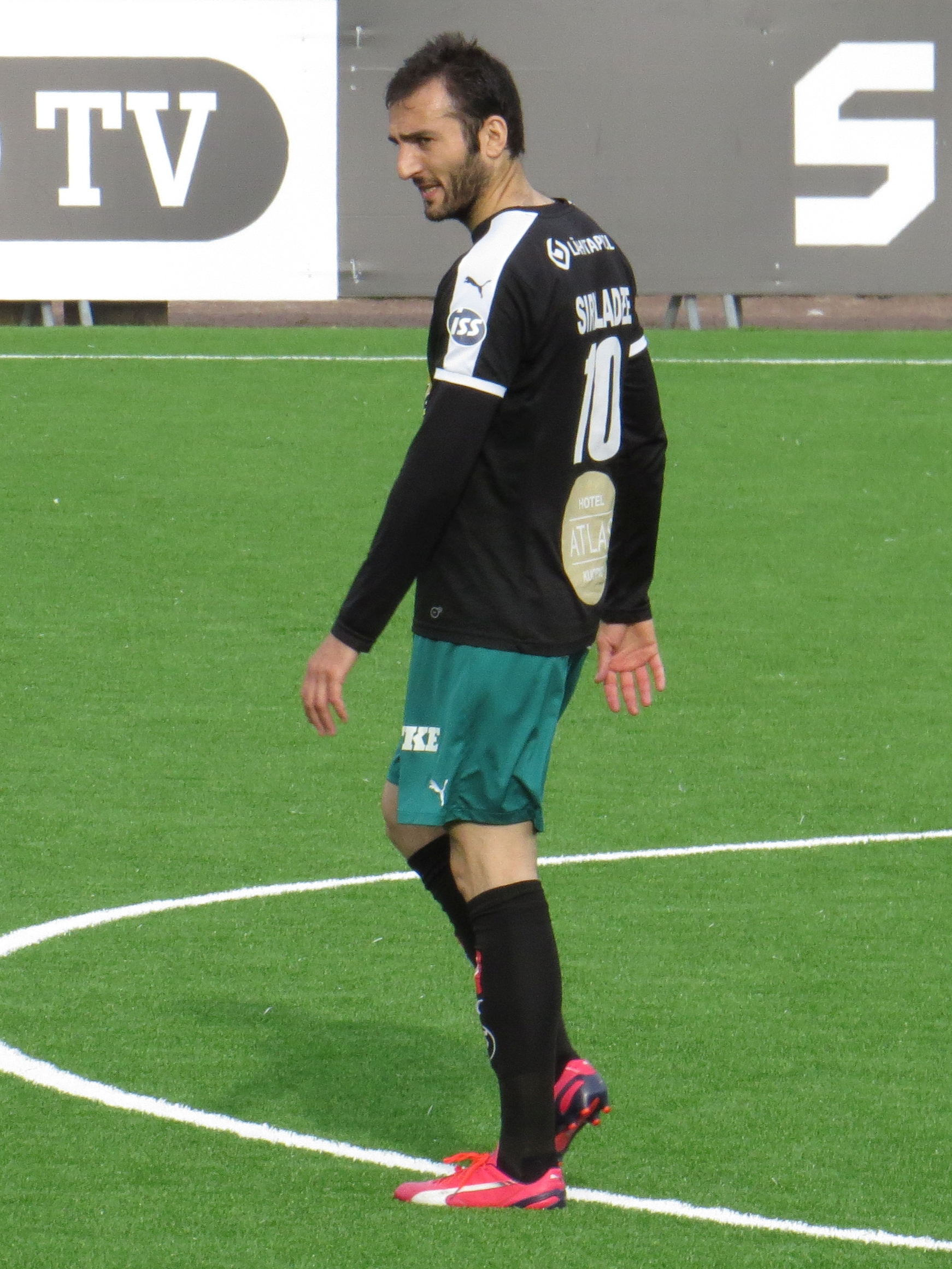
- Sirbiladze with KuPS in 2015

Personal information
- Date of birth: 27 September 1982 (age 44)
- Place of birth: Tbilisi, Georgian SSR, Soviet Union
- Height: 1.93 m (6 ft 4 in)
- Position: Forward

Senior career*
| Years | Team | Apps | (Gls) |
| 2001–2002 | Locomotive Tbilisi | 8 | (3) |
| 2003–2004 | Dinamo Batumi | 20 | (2) |
| 2004–2005 | Locomotive Tbilisi | 35 | (6) |
| 2005–2006 | Sioni Bolnisi | 7 | (0) |
| 2006–2007 | Olimpi Rustavi | 11 | (4) |
| 2008 | Norchi Dinamoeli | 12 | (7) |
| 2008–2009 | FC Spartaki Tskhinvali | 23 | (7) |
| 2009 | AC Kajaani | 3 | (2) |
| 2010–2011 | KPV Kokkola | 37 | (17) |
| 2011 | → FF Jaro (loan) | 15 | (9) |
| 2012–2014 | Inter Turku | 93 | (35) |
| 2015–2016 | KuPS | 29 | (3) |
| 2016–2017 | KPV Kokkola | 52 | (23) |
| 2018 | JIPPO | 2 | (2) |
| Total | | 347 | (139) |

International career
| 2012–2013 | Georgia | 5 | (0) |
- * Club domestic league appearances and goals

Irakli Sirbiladze (Georgian: ირაკლი სირბილაძე; born 27 September 1982) is a Georgian former professional footballer who played as a forward.

== Honors ==
- Ykkönen player of the year: 2010
- Ykkönen best goalscorer: 2010
- Veikkausliiga Striker of the year: 2012
- Veikkausliiga Player of the Month: September 2012
