= 1988 Ykkönen – Finnish League Division 1 =

Finnish League Division 1
- Season: 1988
- Champions: Jaro Pietarsaari
- Promoted: Jaro Pietarsaari
- Relegated: GrIFK Kauniainen; FinnPa Helsinki; TPV Tampere

League table for teams participating in Ykkönen, the second tier of the Finnish Soccer League system, in 1988.

== League table ==
Pos	Team	Pld	W	D	L	GF	GA	GD	Pts
1	Jaro Pietarsaari	22	10	9	3	40	22	+18	29
2	MyPa Anjalankoski	22	11	7	4	40	27	+13	29
3	TuTo Turku	22	8	10	4	29	20	+9	26
4	KontU Helsinki	22	9	5	8	27	24	+3	23
5	KPV Kokkola	22	8	6	8	31	27	+4	22
6	Koparit Kuopio	22	7	8	7	42	42	0	22
7	VaKP Valkeakoski	22	8	4	10	42	33	+9	20
8	Elo Kuopio	22	5	10	7	35	37	−2	20
9	VanPa Vantaa	22	6	8	8	27	35	−8	20
10	GrIFK Kauniainen	22	7	6	9	31	36	−5	20
11	FinnPa Helsinki	22	5	7	10	25	45	−20	17
12	TPV Tampere	22	5	6	11	26	47	−21	16

Promotion replay: Jaro Pietarsaari - MyPa Anjalankoski 1-1 aet., 3-2 pen.
Relegation replay: VanPa Vantaa - GrIFK Kauniainen 3–0

== Promotion/relegation playoff ==
- KuPS Kuopio - MyPa Anjalankoski 2–1
- MyPa Anjalankoski - KuPS Kuopio 2–2

KuPS Kuopio stayed in Premier Division.

== See also ==
- Mestaruussarja (Tier 1)
