= Anton Lepola =

Finnish footballer (born 1996)

Personal information
- Full name: Anton Simo Sakari Lepola
- Date of birth: 24 July 1996 (age 30)
- Place of birth: Finland
- Position: Goalkeeper

Team information
- Current team: FC Haka
- Number: 12

Youth career
- TPS

Senior career*
Years	Team	Apps	(Gls)
2014	Åbo IFK	4	(0)
2015–2016	TPS	0	(0)
2017	SalPa	22	(0)
2017–2018	IFK Mariehamn	7	(0)
2019	TPS	6	(0)
2020–2022	KTP	72	(0)
2023–	Haka	68	(0)
- * Club domestic league appearances and goals as of 1 November 2026

Anton Simo Sakari Lepola (born 24 July 1996) is a Finnish professional footballer who plays as a goalkeeper for Ykkösliiga club Haka.

== Career ==
On 5 December 2018, Lepola signed with TPS.

In March 2023, Lepola signed for FC Haka following three seasons with KTP. On 23 July 2024, he extended his contract with Haka until the end of 2026.
