= Asko Jussila =

Finnish football manager

Personal information
- Date of birth: 25 January 1963 (age 63)
- Place of birth: Hämeenlinna, Finland

Managerial career
- Years: Team
- 2006–2012: Haka (assistant)
- 2012: Haka (caretaker)
- 2016–2018: Haka (U19)

Asko Jussila (born 25 January 1963) is a Finnish football manager.
