= Antti Muurinen =

Finnish football coach

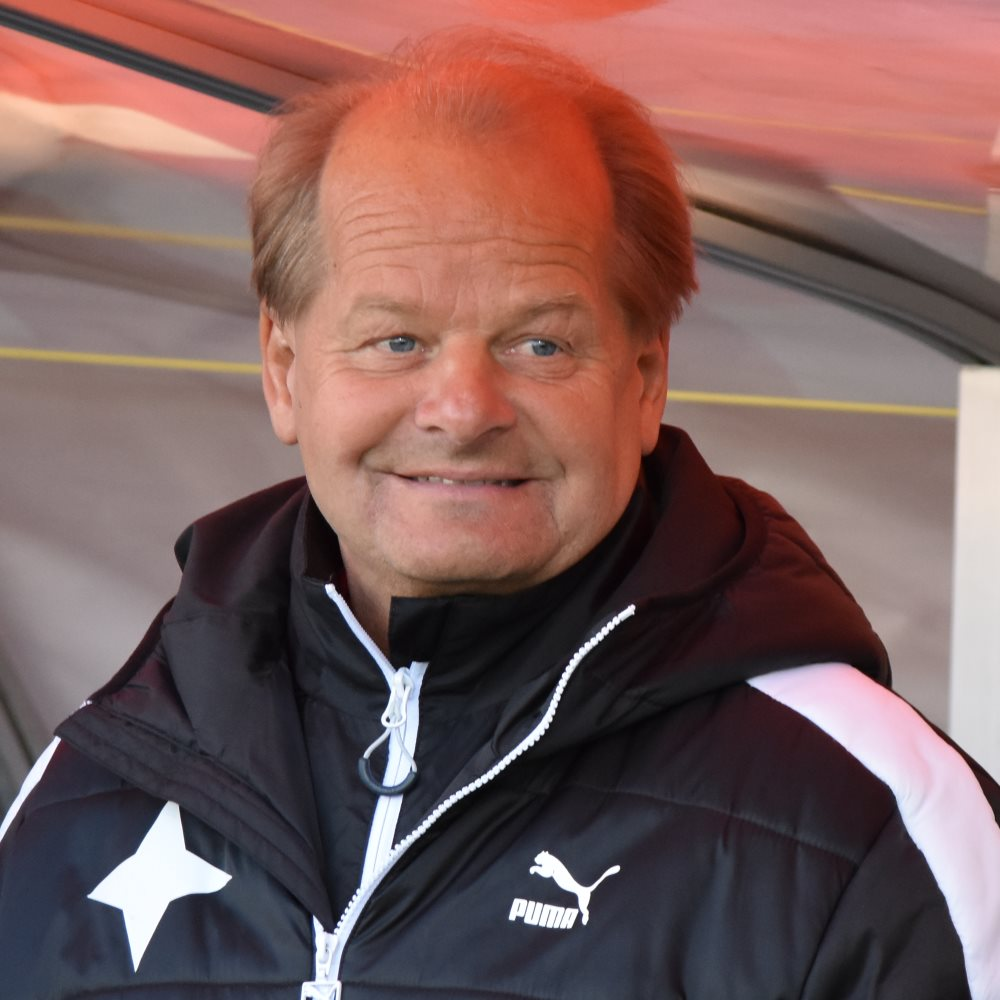
- Muurinen in 2017

Personal information
- Date of birth: 4 March 1954 (age 72)
- Place of birth: Valkeakoski, Finland

Managerial career
- Years: Team
- 1981–1987: KontU
- 1988–1993: Kuusysi
- 1994–1996: Jaro
- 1997–1999: HJK Helsinki
- 2000–2005: Finland
- 2006–2007: Lahti
- 2007–2012: HJK Helsinki
- 2014: MYPA
- 2016–2017: HIFK

Antti Muurinen (born 4 March 1954) is a Finnish football coach.

Muurinen served as the head coach of the Finland national team. He led Finland in qualifying campaigns for the 2002 World Cup, UEFA Euro 2004 and the 2006 World Cup, although the team failed to reach the finals in each instance.

In June 2005 Finnish football fans held a protest against Muurinen, and after a 4–0 defeat against Netherlands, the Finnish Football Association dismissed him.

In 2006, Muurinen was appointed manager of FC Lahti in Finland's Veikkausliiga. Before the end of the 2007 season he returned to HJK Helsinki, a club he had previously managed from 1997 to 1999.

Muurinen is also known for leading HJK Helsinki into the UEFA Champions League group stage in the 1998–99 season, the only time a Finnish club has achieved this feat. He has also won the Finnish Championship with HJK Helsinki in 1997, 2009, 2010, 2011 and 2012 as well as with FC Kuusysi in 1989 and 1991, the Finnish Cup with HJK Helsinki in 1998 and 2008, and the Finnish League Cup with FC Lahti in 2007.

He was inducted into the Finnish Football Hall of Fame in 2019.

== Honours ==
- Finnish Championship (7): 1989, 1991, 1997, 2009, 2010, 2011, 2012
- Finnish Cup (3): 1998, 2008, 2011
- Finnish League Cup (3): 1997, 1998, 2007
- Coach of the year (5): 1989, 1997, 1998, 2009, 2011
- First ever Finnish manager to participate in the UEFA Champions League group-stage. (1998–1999)

=== Double ===
- 2011 Finnish Championship and Finnish Cup

Individual

- Finnish Football Manager of the Year: 1989, 1997, 1998, 2009, 2010, 2011
- Veikkausliiga Coach of the Month: June 2011, October 2012, April 2014
