= Pyry Kärkkäinen =

Finnish footballer (born 1986)

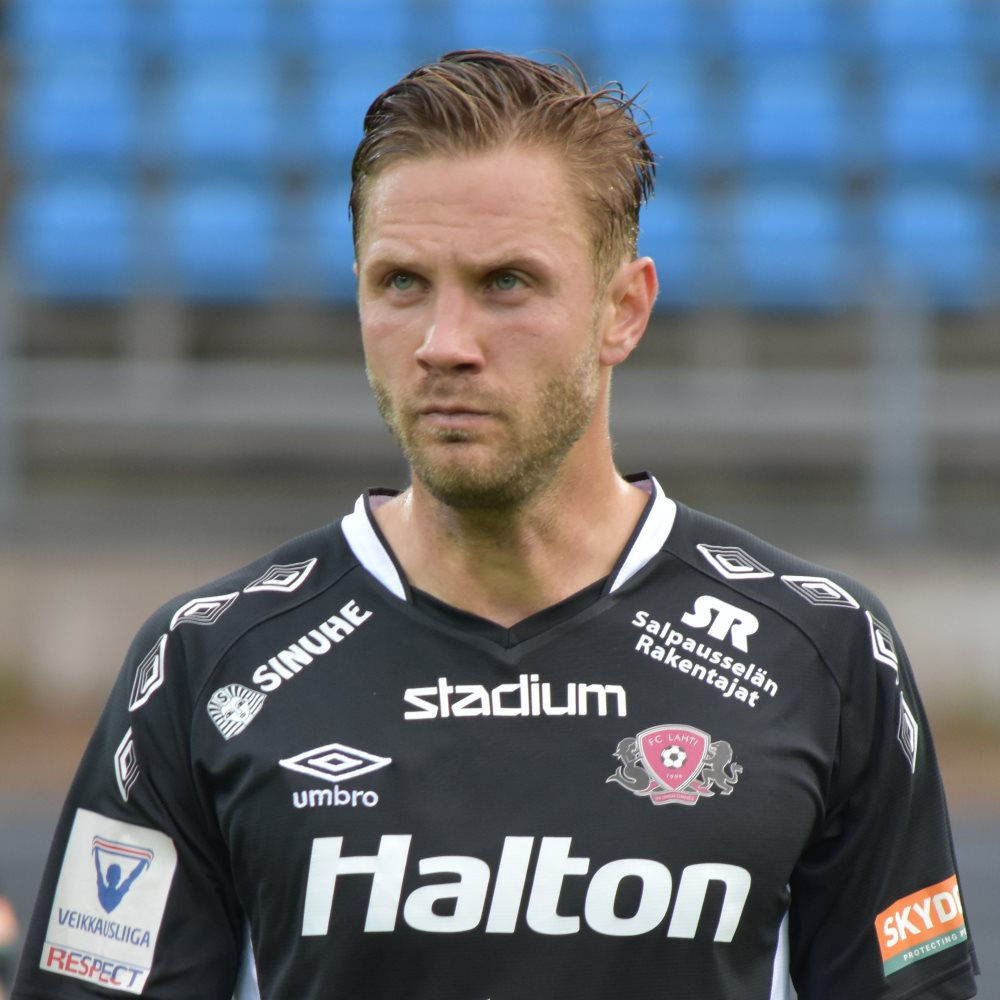

Personal information
- Date of birth: 10 November 1986 (age 39)
- Place of birth: Kiuruvesi, Finland
- Height: 1.85 m (6 ft 1 in)
- Position: Centre-back

Team information
- Current team: PPJ
- Number: 6

Youth career
- Kiuruveden Palloilijat

Senior career*
Years	Team	Apps	(Gls)
2003	PK-37	?	(?)
2004–2006	KuPS	35	(1)
2007–2008	Lahti	46	(3)
2009–2010	HJK Helsinki	35	(2)
2011–2012	KuPS	63	(2)
2013–2017	Lahti	141	(7)
2021–	PPJ	10	(1)

International career
2006–2009	Finland U21	12	(0)
- * Club domestic league appearances and goals as of 28 March 2022

Pyry Kärkkäinen (born 10 November 1986) is a Finnish professional footballer who plays as a centre-back for Kakkonen club PPJ.

== Club career ==
Kärkkäinen started his career with Kiuruveden Palloilijat where he played, until joining PK-37 for the season 2003. In 2003, he went on trial at Molde FK. For the season 2004, he moved to Kuopio and KuPS. He signed for three years. KuPS was relegated in 2006 and Kärkkäinen left the club and signed with FC Lahti. At that time he was already a regular in the Finnish under-19 national team. FC Honka had Kärkkäinen at trial in 2006, but chose not to offer a contract and FC Lahti's coach Antti Muurinen signed him for the first time.

In November 2008, Kärkkäinen signed a two-year contract with the capital city club HJK. Also in this time Muurinen wanted to have the talented centre-back. He made his first appearance for HJK in the 5–1 home win against his former club KuPS on 18 April 2009. He also scored his first goal for HJK in the same match.

After having played for Lahti between 2013 and 2017, Kärkkäinen took a career break. He returned to football in 2021, signing with recently promoted third-tier Kakkonen club PPJ.

== International career ==
He was a part of the Finland U21s, that qualified for the UEFA European Under-21 Football Championship in 2009. He has also played for U17's and U19's.

== Honours ==
KuPS

- Finnish League Cup: 2006

Lahti

- Finnish League Cup: 2007

HJK Helsinki

- Veikkausliiga: 2009, 2010
