= Giorgi Ositashvili =

Georgian footballer (born 1985)

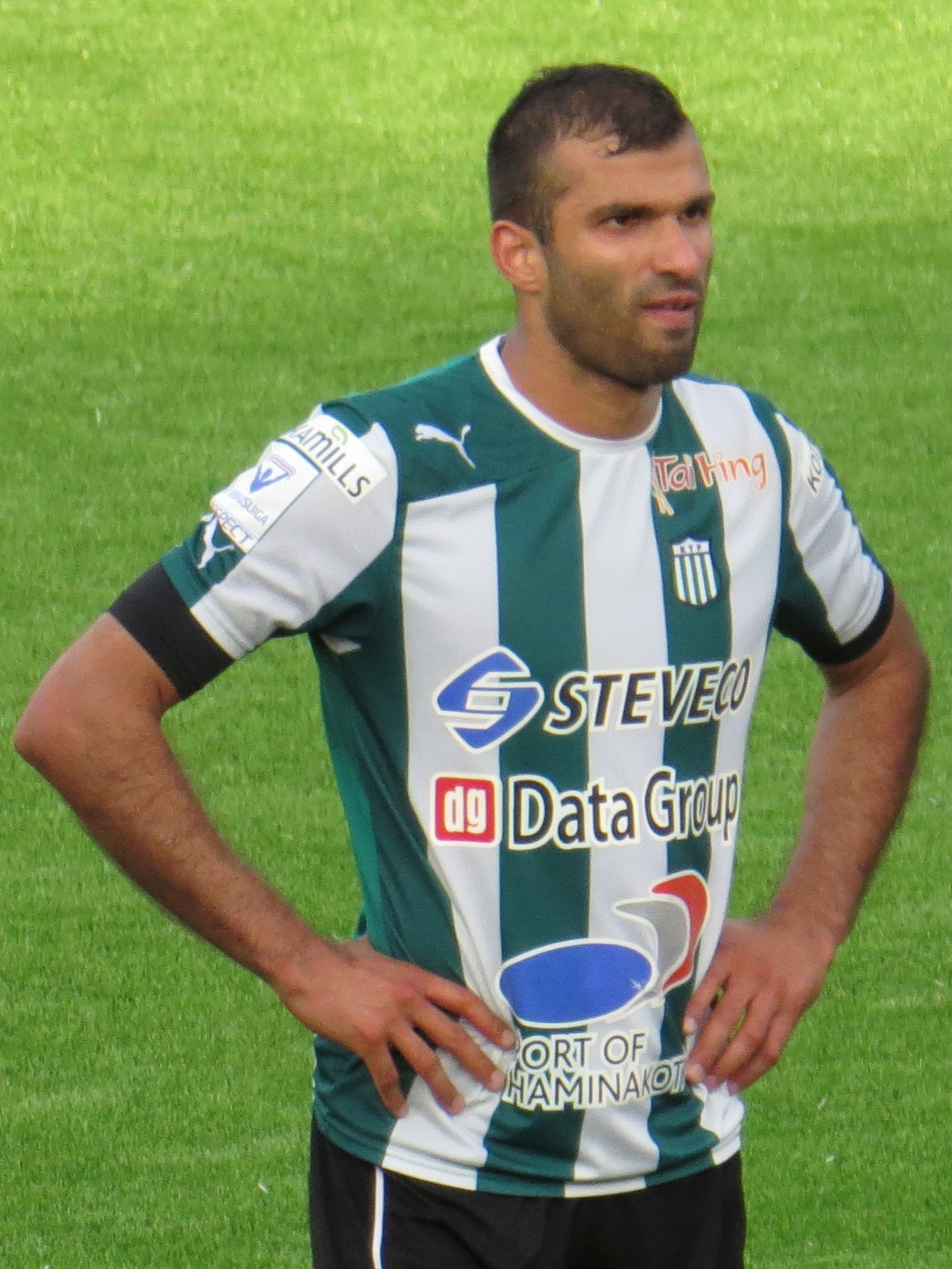
- Ositashvili with KTP in 2015

Personal information
- Full name: Giorgi Ositašvili
- Date of birth: 13 March 1985 (age 41)
- Place of birth: Tbilisi, Georgian SSR, Soviet Union
- Height: 1.86 m (6 ft 1 in)
- Position: Left back

Team information
- Current team: KTP

Senior career*
Years	Team	Apps	(Gls)
2003–2007	Merani Tbilisi	82	(4)
2008	Kuusankoski	23	(0)
2009–2013	KooTeePee	106	(6)
2014–2016	KTP	48	(0)
2017	Kultsu	14	(0)
2018–2019	TPV	35	(2)
2021	PP-70	2	(0)
2021–2023	Ilves-Kissat	3	(0)

Managerial career
- 2020–2023: Ilves-Kissat
- * Club domestic league appearances and goals

Giorgi Ositashvili (Georgian: გიორგი ოსიტაშვილი; born 13 March 1985) is a Georgian football coach and former professional footballer who spent most of his career in Finland.
