= Jukka Vakkila =

Finnish football manager

Jukka Keijo Olavi Vakkila (2 April 1951, Joutseno) is a Finnish football manager. He coached FC Haka in 1982–1984, 1986–1987, 1993–1996 and FC Jazz in 1997. He won the Finnish championship in 1995 with Haka.

Vakkila was the head coach of the Finnish national team from 1988 to 1992.
