= 1996 Finnish Cup =

1996 Suomen Cup
Tournament details
- Country: Finland

The 1996 Finnish Cup (Finnish: Suomen Cup) was the 42nd season of the main annual association football cup competition in Finland. It was organised as a single-elimination knock–out tournament and participation in the competition was voluntary. The final was held at the Olympic Stadium, Helsinki on 3 November 1996 with HJK defeating TPS by 1–1 before an attendance of 3,632 spectators.

== Early rounds ==
Not currently available.

== Round 8 ==
| Tie no | Home team | Score | Away team | Information |
|---|---|---|---|---|
| 1 | JJK Jyväskylä | 1-2 (aet) | Jaro Pietarsaari | |
| 2 | Kanuunat Kajaani | 0-2 | TPS Turku | |
| 3 | Rakuunat Lapeenranta | 1-3 (aet) | HJK Helsinki | |
| 4 | PK-35 Helsinki | 1-1 (aet); 7-6 (p.) | Haka Valkeakoski | |

| Tie no | Home team | Score | Away team | Information |
|---|---|---|---|---|
| 5 | VPS Vaasa | 2-0 | FinnPa Helsinki | |
| 6 | RoPS Rovaniemi | 4-1 | Jazz Pori | |
| 7 | MyPa Anjalankoski | 2-1 | Inter Turku | |
| 8 | TPV Tampere | 3-2 (aet) | TiPS Vantaa | |

== Quarter-finals ==
| Tie no | Home team | Score | Away team | Information |
|---|---|---|---|---|
| 1 | TPV Tampere | 0-1 | MyPa Anjalankoski | |
| 2 | Jaro Pietarsaari | 2-0 | VPS Vaasa | |

| Tie no | Home team | Score | Away team | Information |
|---|---|---|---|---|
| 3 | PK-35 Helsinki | 0-1 (aet) | HJK Helsinki | |
| 4 | TPS Turku | 1-0 | RoPS Rovaniemi | |

== Semi-finals ==
| Tie no | Home team | Score | Away team | Information |
|---|---|---|---|---|
| 1 | MyPa Anjalankoski | 2-2 | HJK Helsinki | First leg |
| 2 | TPS Turku | 2-1 | Jaro Pietarsaari | First leg |

| Tie no | Home team | Score | Away team | Information |
|---|---|---|---|---|
| 3 | HJK Helsinki | 4-0 | MyPa Anjalankoski | Second leg |
| 4 | Jaro Pietarsaari | 1-2 | TPS Turku | Second leg |

== Final ==
| Tie no | Team 1 | Score | Team 2 | Information |
|---|---|---|---|---|
| 1 | HJK Helsinki | 0-0 (aet); 4-3 (p. | TPS Turku | Att. 3,632 |
