= Keith Armstrong (footballer) =

English-Finnish footballer and coach (born 1957)

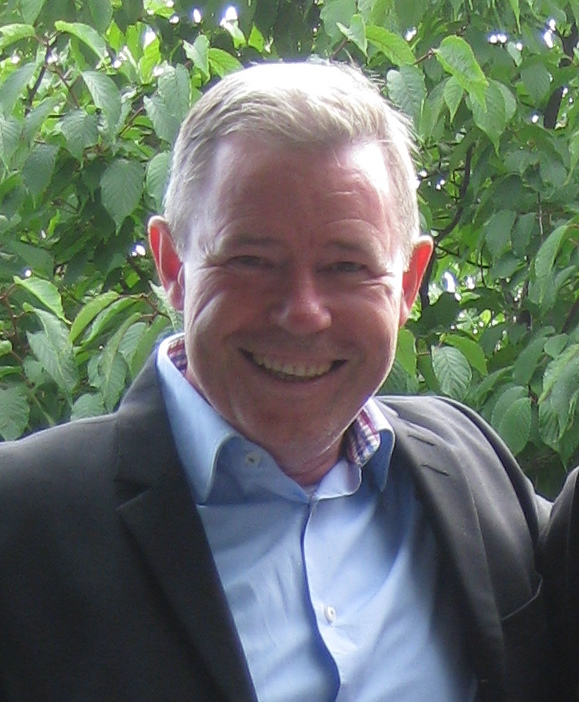
- Armstrong in 2015

Personal information
- Full name: Keith Thomas Armstrong
- Date of birth: 11 October 1957 (age 69)
- Place of birth: Corbridge, Northumberland, England
- Position: Winger

Senior career*
Years	Team	Apps	(Gls)
1977–1978	Sunderland	11	(0)
1978	Newport County	4	(0)
1978	Scunthorpe United	0	(0)
1978–1981	OPS	57	(20)
1982	Koparit	14	(1)
1983	OPS	28	(6)
1984	Kuusysi	21	(12)
1985	KPV	21	(2)
1986	KePS	18	(2)
1987–1988	VIFK		(11)
1989–1990	TP-Seinäjoki	23	(8)
1990	IFK Mariehamn		(3)
1991–1992	RoPS		(39)

Managerial career
- 1993–1994: RoPS
- 1995–1996: TP-Seinäjoki
- 1997–2001: Haka
- 2002–2007: HJK
- 2012–2014: SJK (sporting director)
- 2015: Ilves
- 2017–2018: Haka
- * Club domestic league appearances and goals

Keith Thomas Armstrong (born 11 October 1957) is an English former football player and coach who played in the Football League for Sunderland, Newport County and Scunthorpe United, and in Finland for a number of clubs, where he also coached.

Born in England, Armstrong became a naturalised Finn in the early 1990s, and enjoyed a long and successful coaching career in Finland with Rovaniemen Palloseura, TP-Seinäjoki, FC Haka and most recently HJK Helsinki. Armstrong is one of the most successful football managers in the Finnish league, having won five Veikkausliiga championships, two Finnish Cups, and two Manager of the Year awards.

On 8 June 2023, Armstrong was named in the Finnish Football Hall of Fame.

== Playing career ==
Armstrong was born in Corbridge, Northumberland. He began his football career as an apprentice with Sunderland, making his debut in the Second Division on 4 October 1977 as a substitute in a 1–1 draw at home to Cardiff City. He played regularly at the end of the 1977–78 season, and during the following season spent time on loan to Newport County and Scunthorpe United before being released. He joined Newcastle United, but was promptly loaned out to the Finnish club Oulun Palloseura (OPS). He played with OPS for two years, before moving to Koparit in Kuopio. Subsequently, he played in nine different clubs around Finland, appearing in 179 league matches, scoring 60 goals, and winning three championships (with OPS in 1979 and 1980 and with Kuusysi in 1984).

== Coaching career ==
In 1993, at the age of 35, he retired from playing professional football and started out as the manager of his then club Rovaniemen Palloseura (RoPS). For the 1995 season, he moved to Seinäjoki and took the local club, TP-Seinäjoki into the Veikkausliiga. In 1997, he was offered a post at FC Haka, which he accepted, getting the club promoted from the second tier and winning three league championships in a row with the Valkeakoski team. He received the Manager of the Year award in 2000, after Haka's second subsequent title.

In late 2001, he was signed by HJK, propelling the team to a league championship in 2002 and a league and cup double in 2003. In 2004, however, the club finished in mid-table. In 2006 Armstrong received his second Manager of the Year award and led HJK to second place in the league. He was sacked in September 2007.

During 2012–2014, Armstrong worked as a sporting director of SJK in second-tier Ykkönen and in top-tier Veikkausliiga.

== Later career ==
A fluent Finnish speaker, he also works for Finnish television as a football pundit and studio commentator for Canal+ Scandinavia. Armstrong was part of Finland national football team's ex-manager Stuart Baxter's staff, working as scout.

After working as sporting director of SJK for two years, on 24 October 2014 Armstrong was appointed as the new manager of Ilves Tampere for the upcoming season. On 4 October 2015, Armstrong missed Ilves' match against SJK to present MTV3's Premier League coverage. Two days later, on 7 October 2015, Armstrong was sacked by Ilves.

== Personal life ==
His son, Daniel Armstrong, is also a professional footballer for Atalanta U23.

== Honours ==
Individual

- Finnish Football Manager of the Year: 1999, 2000, 2003
- Veikkausliiga Manager of the Month: August 2015
