= Mika Lehkosuo =

Finnish footballer and manager (born 1970)

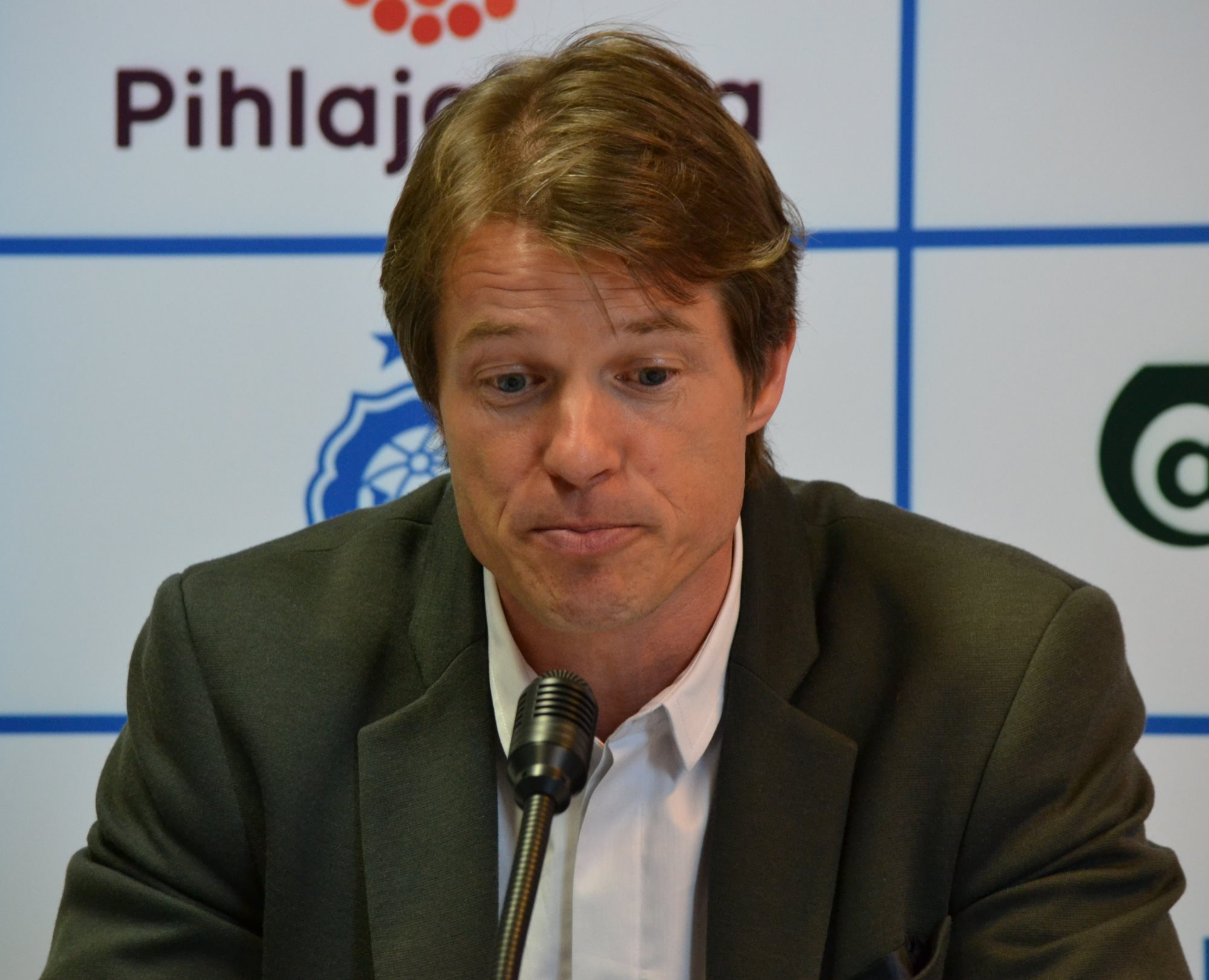
- Lehkosuo as HJK coach in 2017

Personal information
- Date of birth: 8 January 1970 (age 56)
- Place of birth: Helsinki, Finland
- Height: 1.81 m (5 ft 11 in)
- Position: Midfielder

Senior career*
| Years | Team | Apps | (Gls) |
| 1990–1993 | Vantaan Pallo-70 | 48 | (9) |
| 1993–2002 | HJK | 189 | (26) |
| 1994 | → Jaro (loan) | 1 | (0) |
| 1998–1999 | → Perugia (loan) | 11 | (0) |
| 2004 | Klubi 04 | 1 | (0) |
| Total | | 250 | (35) |

International career
| 1997–2000 | Finland | 17 | (1) |

Managerial career
- HJK (youth)
- 2005: Honka (assistant)
- 2005–2014: Honka
- 2013–2015: Finland (assistant)
- 2014–2019: HJK
- 2019–2020: Kongsvinger
- 2023–: Finland U21
- * Club domestic league appearances and goals

Mika Lehkosuo, nicknamed "Bana", (born 8 January 1970) is a Finnish football manager and former player who works as the head coach for the Finland U21 national team.

== Playing career ==
A midfielder, Lehkosuo played most of his career at HJK Helsinki. He was not a very prominent youth player and made his top division debut in 1993 after spending three years with lower division club Vantaan Pallo. He did not make his breakthrough into the HJK senior squad until 1995, when he made 24 league appearances and scored one goal. In the previous season he had even played one league match for FF Jaro.

In the following seasons Lehkosuo received more and more responsibilities and became one of the best midfielders in the Veikkausliiga. In the end of the 1990s he formed the successful midfield trio with Aki Riihilahti and Jarkko Wiss with whom he won the league title in 1997 and worked their way to the group stage of UEFA Champions League in the next season.

A sponsorship deal with a local radio station meant that Lehkuosuo wore the unusual shirt number 96.2 for a period at HJK Helsinki. This deal ended when he was forbidden to wear the number in UEFA Champions League matches. Lehkuosuo captained HJK in the group stage of the Champions League that season, helping HJK become the first ever Finnish team to earn that distinction.

In the winter of 1998 Lehkosuo was signed on loan by Italian Serie A side Perugia. He only played eleven games in Italy and returned to HJK for the next Veikkausliiga season. In 1999 and 2000 Lehkosuo was made the captain of the HJK squad and he played in a more attacking role. However, in August 2000 Lehkosuo injured his knee ligament. The knee didn't fully recover and Lehkosuo was forced to end his playing career in 2002 after playing 190 matches in Veikkausliiga, of which he played 189 for HJK.

== International career ==
Lehkosuo played 17 matches for the Finnish national team and scored one goal.

== Managerial career ==
Lehkosuo started his managerial career with HJK youth teams quickly after retiring as a player. In 2005, he was appointed as assistant manager of Ville Lyytikäinen of Ykkönen (the second tier) side FC Honka. After Lyytikäinen was sacked, Lehkosuo became head coach. He guided the team to the top place of Ykkönen. In the first season in the Veikkausliiga Lehkosuo guided his team to a fourth-place finish. In 2007 Honka was again fourth. In 2008 Lehkosuo guided Honka to second place and to the UEFA Cup qualifications for the next season. In 2009 Honka was again second in the league table. Lehkosuo managed Honka until February 2014.

On 29 April 2014, Lehkosuo was appointed as the manager of HJK after Sixten Boström was sacked. He led HJK into the Europa League group stages in 2014 with a 5–4 aggregate victory over Rapid Wien in the play-off round. After winning three Veikkausliiga titles and two Finnish Cups, he left the club in May 2019.

Lehkosuo was appointed head coach of Norwegian 1. divisjon club Kongsvinger in December 2019. He was dismissed in September 2020 after Kongsvinger picked up only 13 points from 18 games. However, he continued with the club as a scout and the development director until the end of 2022.

In January 2023, Lehkosuo started as a head coach of the Finland under-21 national team. He led the team to qualify for the 2025 UEFA European Under-21 Championship final tournament, for the second time in the nation's history, after finishing 2nd in the Group E and defeating Norway in the play-offs 6–3 on aggregate.

He will take over the Finland national team as of 1 January 2027.

== Personal life ==
Lehkosuo graduated as a Master of Science in Technology from Helsinki University of Technology in 2003.

== Career statistics ==
=== Club ===
As of 1 September 2024

Appearances and goals by club, season and competition
| Club | Season | League | | | Cup | | Europe | | Total | |
| Club | Season | Division | Apps | Goals | Apps | Goals | Apps | Goals | Apps | Goals |
|---|---|---|---|---|---|---|---|---|---|---|
| Vantaan Pallo | 1990 | Ykkönen | 3 | 0 | – | | – | | 3 | 0 |
| Vantaan Pallo | 1991 | Kakkonen | 1 | 0 | – | | – | | 1 | 0 |
| Vantaan Pallo | 1992 | Ykkönen | 19 | 4 | – | | – | | 19 | 4 |
| Vantaan Pallo | Total | | 23 | 4 | 0 | 0 | 0 | 0 | 23 | 4 |
| HJK | 1993 | Veikkausliiga | 17 | 1 | – | | 2 (Note: Appearances in UEFA Champions League) | 0 | 19 | 1 |
| HJK | 1994 | Veikkausliiga | 7 | 0 | – | | 3 (Note: Appearances in UEFA Cup Winners' Cup) | 0 | 10 | 0 |
| HJK | 1995 | Veikkausliiga | 24 | 1 | – | | – | | 24 | 1 |
| HJK | 1996 | Veikkausliiga | 26 | 3 | 1 | 0 | 4 (Note: Appearances in UEFA Cup) | 1 | 31 | 4 |
| HJK | 1997 | Veikkausliiga | 22 | 3 | – | | 2 | 0 | 24 | 3 |
| HJK | 1998 | Veikkausliiga | 22 | 5 | 1 | 1 | 10 | 4 | 33 | 10 |
| HJK | 1999 | Veikkausliiga | 22 | 2 | – | | 4 | 1 | 26 | 3 |
| HJK | 2000 | Veikkausliiga | 21 | 6 | – | | 1 | 0 | 22 | 6 |
| HJK | 2001 | Veikkausliiga | 10 | 3 | – | | 2 | 0 | 12 | 3 |
| HJK | 2002 | Veikkausliiga | 18 | 2 | – | | 1 | 0 | 19 | 2 |
| HJK | Total | | 189 | 26 | 2 | 1 | 29 | 6 | 220 | 33 |
| Jaro (loan) | 1994 | Veikkausliiga | 1 | 0 | – | | – | | 1 | 0 |
| Perugia (loan) | 1998–99 | Serie A | 11 | 0 | – | | – | | 11 | 0 |
| Career total | | | 224 | 30 | 2 | 1 | 29 | 6 | 255 | 37 |

=== International ===
As of match played 26 April 2000

Finland
| Year | Apps | Goals |
|---|---|---|
| 1997 | 3 | 0 |
| 1998 | 0 | 0 |
| 1999 | 6 | 1 |
| 2000 | 8 | 0 |
| Total | 17 | 1 |

=== International goals ===
As of match played 18 August 1999. Finland score listed first, score column indicates score after each Lehkosuo goal.

List of international goals scored by Mika Lehkosuo
| No. | Date | Venue | Opponent | Score | Result | Competition |
|---|---|---|---|---|---|---|
| 1 | 18 August 1999 | Jan Breydel Stadium, Brugge, Belgium | Belgium | 4–2 | 4–3 | Friendly |

=== Managerial statistics ===
As of match played 25 September 2026

Managerial record by team and tenure
| Team | Nat | From | To | Record | | | | | | | |
| Team | Nat | From | To | P | W | D | L | GF | GA | GD | W% |
|---|---|---|---|---|---|---|---|---|---|---|---|
| Honka | (Finland) | 30 May 2005 | 14 February 2014 | 360 | 182 | 93 | 85 | 659 | 407 | +252 | 50.56 |
| HJK | (Finland) | 29 April 2014 | 22 May 2019 | 249 | 143 | 64 | 42 | 460 | 228 | +232 | 57.43 |
| Kongsvinger | (Norway) | 1 January 2020 | 29 September 2020 | 18 | 3 | 4 | 11 | 19 | 36 | −17 | 16.67 |
| Finland U21 | (Finland) | 1 January 2023 | present | 35 | 18 | 7 | 10 | 75 | 35 | +40 | 51.43 |
| Total | | | | 641 | 332 | 164 | 145 | 1,167 | 702 | +465 | 51.79 |

== Honours ==
=== As a player ===
HJK

- Veikkausliiga: 1997, 2002
- Finnish Cup: 1996, 1998, 2000
- Finnish League Cup: 1996, 1997, 1998

Individual

- HJK Hall of Fame Inductee

=== As a manager ===
FC Honka

- Finnish Cup: 2012
- Finnish League Cup: 2010, 2011
- Ykkönen: 2005

HJK

- Veikkausliiga: 2014, 2017, 2018
- Finnish Cup: 2014, 2016–17
- Finnish League Cup: 2015

Individual

- Finnish Football Manager of the Year: 2014, 2017
- Veikkausliiga Coach of the Month: October 2011, May 2013, June 2013, May 2014, September 2014, May 2016, April 2017, June 2017
- Veikkausliiga Manager of the Year: 2014, 2017
