= Jyrki Heliskoski =

Finnish football coach (1945–2020)

Jyrki Antero ("Jyrä") Heliskoski (September 28, 1945 – December 28, 2020) was a Finnish football coach.

Heliskoski worked briefly as the head coach of the Finland national team from July 2005 to January 2006. He then continued as an assistant coach under Roy Hodgson until November 2007. Previously he had coached a number of Finnish national youth teams, including the under-21 team and the under-19 team.

On the club side, Heliskoski coached HJK Helsinki in 1985–89, winning three league titles. He also coached HJK in 2000–2001. Before 1978 he worked as a handball coach.
