= 1988 Mestaruussarja =

Mestaruussarja
- Season: 1988

Statistics of Mestaruussarja in the 1988 season.

== Overview ==
It was contested by 12 teams, and HJK Helsinki won the championship.

== Preliminary stage ==
=== Table ===
Pos	Team	Pld	W	D	L	GF	GA	GD	Pts
1	HJK Helsinki	22	16	2	4	44	22	+22	34
2	Kuusysi Lahti	22	12	5	5	48	25	+23	29
3	Reipas Lahti	22	9	9	4	39	29	+10	27
4	RoPS Rovaniemi	22	8	10	4	31	22	+9	26
5	TPS Turku	22	8	10	4	25	19	+6	26
6	Haka Valkeakoski	22	8	7	7	32	26	+6	23
7	KePS Kemi	22	8	7	7	24	32	−8	23
8	Ilves Tampere	22	7	6	9	31	38	−7	20
9	MP Mikkeli	22	6	8	8	19	29	−10	20
10	OTP Oulu	22	5	6	11	24	31	−7	16
11	KuPS Kuopio	22	3	8	11	18	30	−12	14
12	PPT Pori	22	0	6	16	21	53	−32	6

Source: rsssf.com

=== Results ===
Home \ Away	HAK	HJK	ILV	KEM	KPS	KUU	MP	OTP	PPT	REI	RPS	TPS
FC Haka		1–1	2–1	7–1	3–1	1–0	0–1	1–4	3–3	3–1	2–2	1–3
HJK Helsinki	1–0		3–0	6–2	1–0	0–1	3–2	3–1	2–1	5–0	3–1	0–2
Ilves	0–2	3–1		0–0	3–0	0–0	2–1	2–2	3–1	0–6	0–0	0–1
KePS	1–0	1–2	1–1		1–0	1–5	0–0	1–0	4–1	0–1	2–2	1–1
KuPS	1–2	0–2	2–4	1–2		3–1	1–2	2–0	2–0	1–1	0–0	0–0
Kuusysi	0–2	1–1	4–1	1–0	2–0		1–1	3–0	4–1	5–3	1–5	2–2
MP	3–2	0–2	0–3	2–0	0–0	1–3		1–1	0–0	0–3	0–0	0–2
OTP	0–0	0–2	3–0	0–2	0–0	1–0	1–2		3–0	1–2	0–0	1–1
PPT	0–0	1–2	1–4	1–2	2–2	0–6	0–2	2–3		1–1	1–2	0–1
Reipas	0–0	4–1	1–1	0–0	1–1	1–5	4–0	1–0	2–2		1–0	4–1
RoPS	2–0	1–2	4–3	1–2	2–0	1–1	0–0	4–2	2–1	1–1		1–0
TPS	0–0	0–1	3–0	0–0	1–1	0–2	1–1	2–1	3–2	1–1	0–0	

Legend: Blue = home team win; Yellow = draw; Red = away team win.

== Championship group ==
=== Table ===
Pos	Team	Pld	W	D	L	GF	GA	GD	Pts
1	HJK Helsinki (C)	27	20	3	4	55	28	+27	43
2	Kuusysi Lahti	27	14	6	7	57	30	+27	34
3	RoPS Rovaniemi	27	10	11	6	37	29	+8	31
4	Reipas Lahti	27	10	10	7	47	39	+8	30
5	TPS Turku	27	10	10	7	29	27	+2	30
6	Haka Valkeakoski	27	10	7	10	41	37	+4	27

Source: rsssf.com
(C) Champions

=== Results ===
Home \ Away	HAK	HJK	KUU	REI	RPS	TPS
FC Haka		1–3			3–1	
HJK Helsinki			3–2		1–1	2–1
Kuusysi	3–0			1–1		3–0
Reipas	2–4	1–2				2–0
RoPS			1–0	3–2		
TPS	2–1				1–0	

Legend: Blue = home team win; Yellow = draw; Red = away team win.

== Relegation group ==
=== Table ===
Pos	Team	Pld	W	D	L	GF	GA	GD	Pts
1	KePS Kemi	27	9	10	8	29	38	−9	28
2	MP Mikkeli	27	8	10	9	24	33	−9	26
3	Ilves Tampere	27	8	9	10	40	47	−7	25
4	OTP Oulu	27	7	9	11	32	36	−4	23
5	KuPS Kuopio (O)	27	4	12	11	24	34	−10	20
6	PPT Pori (R)	27	0	7	20	26	63	−37	7

Source: rsssf.com
(O) Play-off winners; (R) Relegated

=== Results ===
Home \ Away	ILV	KEM	KPS	MP	OTP	PPT
Ilves		1–1	2–2			4–3
KePS			2–2	0–2	1–1	
KuPS					0–0	2–0
MP	0–0		0–0			2–1
OTP	3–2			3–1		
PPT		0–1			1–1	

Legend: Blue = home team win; Yellow = draw; Red = away team win.

== Attendances ==
No.	Club	Average
1	HJK	4,033
2	Ilves	3,594
3	Kuusysi	2,949
4	RoPS	2,222
5	Reipas	1,860
6	TPS	1,842
7	KPS	1,610
8	Oulu	1,414
9	KuPS	1,244
10	Haka	1,152
11	MP	966
12	Jazz	960

== See also ==
- Ykkönen (Tier 2)
