= FC Haka =

Association football club in Finland

Haka
- Full name: Valkeakosken Haka
- Nickname: Haka
- Founded: 1934
- Ground: Tehtaan kenttä, Valkeakoski
- Capacity: 2 800
- Chairman: Olli Huttunen
- Manager: Tommi Ekmark
- League: Ykkösliiga
- 2026: Ykkösliiga, 3rd of 10
- Website: fchaka.fi
Home colours	Away colours

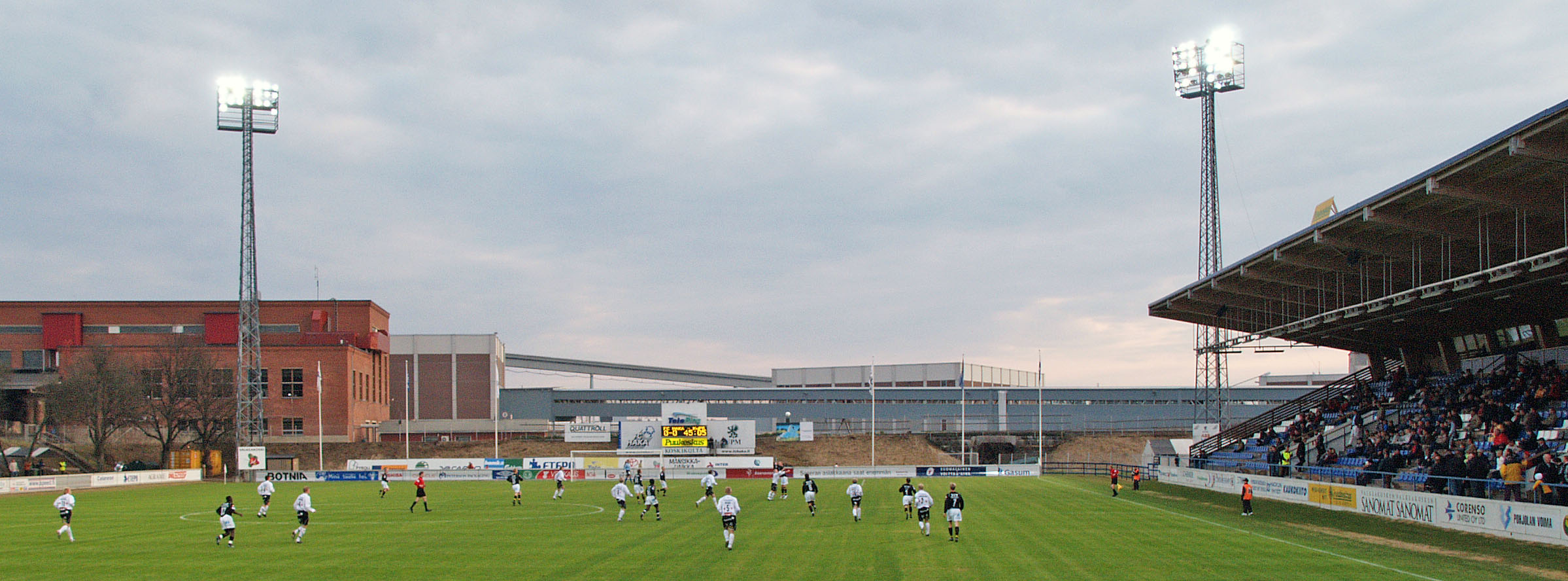
Tehtaan kenttä, home of Haka on a matchday

FC Haka, originally Valkeakosken Haka, commonly known as Haka, is a Finnish professional football club based in the industrial town of Valkeakoski. The club was founded in 1934 and competes in Finland's second division the Ykkösliiga. It is one of the most successful clubs in Finland, with nine Finnish championships and 12 Finnish Cup wins.

== History ==
Haka has historically had close ties with the paper industry in the Valkeakoski area, and is still sponsored by UPM Kymmene.

The club was founded as Valkeakosken Haka in 1934, with significant support from paper entrepreneur Juuso Walden. In 1949 it was promoted to Finland's top division Mestaruussarja (now known as Veikkausliiga), and in 1955 won the inaugural Finnish Cup.

The 1960s was the most successful era in Haka's history, with the club winning both the league and cup three times, including the first double in Finnish football history in 1960. The club was relegated in 1972, but came straight back, and won the double again in 1977.

The club's name was changed to FC Haka in the early 1990s. Haka won the title again 1995, but was relegated the next season. Keith Armstrong was hired as the new coach, and the club came straight back again, winning three straight championships from 1998 to 2000. Goalkeeping legend Olli Huttunen succeeded Armstrong as coach in 2002, and led the club to the championship (2004) and two cups (2002 and 2005).

Haka's best performance in UEFA competition was in the 1983–1984 season when they reached the quarterfinals of the Cup Winners' Cup, losing to eventual champions Juventus 0–2 on aggregate. The club was involved in European competition every year between 1998 and the 2008–2009 season.

In subsequent years the club's financial situation deteriorated on two occasions, like many other small market teams in Veikkausliiga. The first was the 2008–09 season when a group of investors led by local businessman and restaurateur Sedu Koskinen (owner and founder of a nationwide night-club chain) formed FC Haka Oy to help an essentially bankrupt team to finish the season. In 2010 Sedu Koskinen left, after having invested around €1 million of his own money in the club.

Since then the club's operations have been reformed to make it financially sounder. The team, having been one of the most successful and prestigious in Finland, ran at a loss for several years during the 2000s. At the same time the overall global economic situation and sponsorship payments from UPM Kymmene diminished. This forced the club to rationalize its operations and adopt a new role as one of the smaller clubs in Finnish top flight football. The situation at the start of 2012 Finnish football season was described by the chairman and board members as difficult but stable.

These times of financial struggles saw the club move from perennial championship challengers to a team usually poised for relegation. In both 2011 and 2012 pre-season media predictions placed the club in the bottom three. Haka finished last in the standings in 2012 and were relegated to the second tier (then known as Ykkönen, but rebranded in 2023 as Ykkösliiga). The club finally won promotion back to the Veikkausliiga for the 2020 season following a near perfect campaign in the 2019 Ykkönen, where they dropped only 7 points and finished 19 points ahead of second-place TPS.

In December 2025, a fan-started fire destroyed the historic 400-seat wooden stand at FC Haka's Tehtaan Kenttä Stadium, causing significant damage to the nearly century-old ground soon after the club's relegation from the Veikkausliiga.

== Honours ==
- Mestaruussarja/Veikkausliiga
  - Champions (9): 1960, 1962, 1965, 1977, 1995, 1998, 1999, 2000, 2004
- Finnish Cup
  - Winners (12): 1955, 1959, 1960, 1963, 1969, 1977, 1982, 1985, 1988, 1997, 2002, 2005
- Finnish League Cup
  - Winners (1): 1995
- Ykkönen
  - Champions (2): 1997, 2019
  - Promotion (1): 1973

== European campaigns ==
Season	Competition	Round	Country	Club	Score	Agg.
1961–62	European Cup	First round	(Belgium)	Standard Liège	1–5, v 0–2	1–7
1963–64	European Cup	Preliminary round	(Luxembourg)	Jeunesse d'Esch	4–1, v 0–4	4–5
1964–65	European Cup Winners' Cup	First round	(Norway)	Skeid Fotball	0–1, v 2–0	2–1
1964–65	European Cup Winners' Cup	Second round	(Italy)	AC Torino	0–1, v 0–5	0–6
1966–67	European Cup	First round	(Belgium)	RSC Anderlecht	1–10, v 0–2	1–12
1970–71	European Cup Winners' Cup	First round	(Bulgaria)	CSKA Sofia	0–9, v 1–2	1–11
1977–78	UEFA Cup	First round	(Poland)	Górnik Zabrze	3–5, v 0–0	3–5
1978–79	European Cup	First round	(Soviet Union)	Dynamo Kiev	0–1, v 1–3	1–4
1981–82	UEFA Cup	First round	(Sweden)	IFK Göteborg	2–3, v 0–4	2–7
1983–84	European Cup Winners' Cup	First round	(Republic of Ireland)	Sligo Rovers	1–0, v 3–0	4–0
1983–84	European Cup Winners' Cup	Second round	(Sweden)	Hammarby IF	1–1, v 2–1(aet)	3–2
1983–84	European Cup Winners' Cup	Quarter-finals	(Italy)	Juventus	0–1, v 0–1	0–2
1986–87	European Cup Winners' Cup	First round	(Soviet Union)	FC Torpedo Moscow	2–2, v 1–3	3–5
1989–90	European Cup Winners' Cup	First round	(Hungary)	Ferencvárosi TC	1–5, v 1–1	2–6
1996–97	UEFA Cup	First qualifying round	(Estonia)	FC Flora Tallinn	2–2, v 1–0	3–2
1996–97	UEFA Cup	Second qualifying round	(Poland)	Legia Warszawa	0–3, v 1–1	1–4
1998–99	UEFA Cup Winners' Cup	Qualifying round	(Wales)	Bangor City	2–0, v 1–0	3–0
1998–99	UEFA Cup Winners' Cup	First round	(Greece)	Panionios	0–2, v 1–3	1–5
1999–2000	UEFA Champions League	First qualifying round	(Faroe Islands)	HB Tórshavn	1–1, v 6–0	7–1
1999–2000	UEFA Champions League	Second qualifying round	(Scotland)	Rangers	1–4, v 0–3	1–7
2000–01	UEFA Champions League	First qualifying round	(Northern Ireland)	Linfield	1–2, v 1–0	2–2 (a)
2000–01	UEFA Champions League	Second qualifying round	(Slovakia)	Inter Bratislava	0–0, v 0–1(aet)	0–1
2001–02	UEFA Champions League	First qualifying round	(Malta)	Valletta FC	0–0, v 5–0	5–0
2001–02	UEFA Champions League	Second qualifying round	(Israel)	Maccabi Haifa	0–1, v 3–0	3–1
2001–02	UEFA Champions League	Third qualifying round	(England)	Liverpool	0–5, v 1–4	1–9
2001–02	UEFA Cup	First round	(Germany)	1. FC Union Berlin	1–1, v 0–3	1–4
2002	UEFA Intertoto Cup	First round	(Serbia and Montenegro)	FK Obilić	2–1, v 1–1	3–2
2002	UEFA Intertoto Cup	Second round	(England)	Fulham	0–0, v 1–1	1–1 (a)
2003–04	UEFA Cup	Qualifying round	(Croatia)	Hajduk Split	2–1, v 0–1	2–2 (a)
2004–05	UEFA Cup	First qualifying round	(Luxembourg)	Etzella Ettelbruck	2–1, v 3–1	5–2
2004–05	UEFA Cup	Second qualifying round	(Norway)	Stabæk IF	1–3, v 1–3	2–6
2005–06	UEFA Champions League	First qualifying round	(Armenia)	Pyunik F.C.	1–0, v 2–2	3–2
2005–06	UEFA Champions League	Second qualifying round	(Norway)	Vålerenga IF	0–1, v 1–4	1–5
2006–07	UEFA Cup	First qualifying round	(Estonia)	Levadia Tallinn	0–2, v 1–0	1–2
2007–08	UEFA Cup	First qualifying round	(Wales)	Rhyl	1–3, v 2–0	3–3 (a)
2007–08	UEFA Cup	Second qualifying round	(Denmark)	FC Midtjylland	1–2, v 2–5	3–7
2008–09	UEFA Cup	First qualifying round	(Republic of Ireland)	Cork City	2–2, v 4–0	6–2
2008–09	UEFA Cup	Second qualifying round	(Denmark)	Brøndby IF	0–4, v 0–2	0–6
2023–24	UEFA Europa Conference League	First qualifying round	(Northern Ireland)	Crusaders	2–2, v 0–1	2–3

== Divisional movements ==
- Top Level (60 seasons): 1945, 1950–72, 1974–96, 1998–2012, 2020–
- Second Level (18 seasons): 1938–43/44, 1945/46–49, 1973, 1997, 2013–2019

== Season to season ==
Season to Season

Season	Level	Division	Section	Administration	Position	Movements
1937	Tier 3	Maakuntasarja (Second Division)	West	Finnish FA (Suomen Pallolitto)		Promotion Playoff - Promoted
1938	Tier 2	Itä-Länsi-Sarja (Second Division)	West League, Northern Group	Finnish FA (Suomen Palloliitto)	6th	
1939	Tier 2	Itä-Länsi-Sarja (Second Division)	Western League, Group 3	Finnish FA (Suomen Palloliitto)	2nd	
1940-41	Tier 2	B-Sarja (Second Division)		Finnish FA (Suomen Palloliitto)	8th	
1943-44	Tier 2	SPL Suomensarja (Second Division)		Finnish FA (Suomen Palloliitto)	4th	Promoted
1945	Tier 1	SPL Mestaruussarja (Premier Division)	Groub B	Finnish FA (Suomen Palloliitto)	6th	Relegated
1945-46	Tier 2	SPL Suomensarja (Second Division)		Finnish FA (Suomen Palloliitto)	8th	Relegation Playoff
1946-47	Tier 2	Suomensarja (Second Division)	South Group	Finnish FA (Suomen Palloliitto)	3rd	
1947-48	Tier 2	Suomensarja (Second Division)	South Group	Finnish FA (Suomen Palloliitto)	4th	
1948	Tier 2	Suomensarja (Second Division)	South Group	Finnish FA (Suomen Palloliitto)	3rd	
1949	Tier 2	Suomensarja (Second Division)	West Group	Finnish FA (Suomen Palloliitto)	1st	Promoted
1950	Tier 1	Mestaruussarja (Premier Division)		Finnish FA (Suomen Palloliitto)	8th	
1951	Tier 1	Mestaruussarja (Premier Division)		Finnish FA (Suomen Palloliitto)	4th	
1952	Tier 1	Mestaruussarja (Premier Division)		Finnish FA (Suomen Palloliitto)	7th	
1953	Tier 1	Mestaruussarja (Premier Division)		Finnish FA (Suomen Palloliitto)	4th	
1954	Tier 1	Mestaruussarja (Premier Division)		Finnish FA (Suomen Palloliitto)	8th	
1955	Tier 1	Mestaruussarja (Premier Division)		Finnish FA (Suomen Palloliitto)	2nd	
1956	Tier 1	Mestaruussarja (Premier Division)		Finnish FA (Suomen Palloliitto)	5th	
1957	Tier 1	Mestaruussarja (Premier Division)		Finnish FA (Suomen Palloliitto)	2nd	
1958	Tier 1	Mestaruussarja (Premier Division)		Finnish FA (Suomen Palloliitto)	7th	Relegation Playoff
1959	Tier 1	Mestaruussarja (Premier Division)		Finnish FA (Suomen Palloliitto)	3rd	
1960	Tier 1	Mestaruussarja (Premier Division)		Finnish FA (Suomen Palloliitto)	1st	Champions
1961	Tier 1	Mestaruussarja (Premier Division)		Finnish FA (Suomen Palloliitto)	3rd	
1962	Tier 1	Mestaruussarja (Premier Division)		Finnish FA (Suomen Palloliitto)	1st	Champions
1963	Tier 1	Mestaruussarja (Premier Division)		Finnish FA (Suomen Palloliitto)	2nd	
1964	Tier 1	Mestaruussarja (Premier Division)		Finnish FA (Suomen Palloliitto)	4th	
1965	Tier 1	Mestaruussarja (Premier Division)		Finnish FA (Suomen Palloliitto)	1st	Champions
1966	Tier 1	Mestaruussarja (Premier Division)		Finnish FA (Suomen Palloliitto)	3rd	
1967	Tier 1	Mestaruussarja (Premier Division)		Finnish FA (Suomen Palloliitto)	6th	
1968	Tier 1	Mestaruussarja (Premier Division)		Finnish FA (Suomen Palloliitto)	7th	
1969	Tier 1	Mestaruussarja (Premier Division)		Finnish FA (Suomen Palloliitto)	7th	
1970	Tier 1	Mestaruussarja (Premier Division)		Finnish FA (Suomen Palloliitto)	8th	
1971	Tier 1	Mestaruussarja (Premier Division)		Finnish FA (Suomen Palloliitto)	8th	
1972	Tier 1	Mestaruussarja (Premier Division)		Finnish FA (Suomen Palloliitto)	12th	Relegated
1973	Tier 2	I Divisioona (First Division)		Finnish FA (Suomen Palloliitto)	2nd	Promoted
1974	Tier 1	Mestaruussarja (Premier Division)		Finnish FA (Suomen Palloliitto)	8th	
1975	Tier 1	Mestaruussarja (Premier Division)		Finnish FA (Suomen Palloliitto)	10th	Relegation Playoff
1976	Tier 1	Mestaruussarja (Premier Division)		Finnish FA (Suomen Palloliitto)	2nd	
1977	Tier 1	Mestaruussarja (Premier Division)		Finnish FA (Suomen Palloliitto)	1st	Champions
1978	Tier 1	Mestaruussarja (Premier Division)		Finnish FA (Suomen Palloliitto)	3rd	
1979	Tier 1	Mestaruussarja (Premier Division)		Finnish FA (Suomen Palloliitto)	7th	Championship Group – 6th
1980	Tier 1	Mestaruussarja (Premier Division)		Finnish FA (Suomen Palloliitto)	4th	Championship Group – 2nd
1981	Tier 1	Mestaruussarja (Premier Division)		Finnish FA (Suomen Palloliitto)	4th	Championship Group – 3rd
1982	Tier 1	Mestaruussarja (Premier Division)		Finnish FA (Suomen Palloliitto)	3rd	Championship Group – 3rd
1983	Tier 1	Mestaruussarja (Premier Division)		Finnish FA (Suomen Palloliitto)	3rd	Championship Group – 3rd
1984	Tier 1	Mestaruussarja (Premier Division)		Finnish FA (Suomen Palloliitto)	1st	Championship Playoffs – 4th
1985	Tier 1	Mestaruussarja (Premier Division)		Finnish FA (Suomen Palloliitto)	8th	
1986	Tier 1	Mestaruussarja (Premier Division)		Finnish FA (Suomen Palloliitto)	5th	
1987	Tier 1	Mestaruussarja (Premier Division)		Finnish FA (Suomen Palloliitto)	9th	
1988	Tier 1	Mestaruussarja (Premier Division)		Finnish FA (Suomen Palloliitto)	6th	Championship Group – 6th
1989	Tier 1	Mestaruussarja (Premier Division)		Finnish FA (Suomen Palloliitto)	4th	Championship Group – 4th
1990	Tier 1	Veikkausliiga (Premier League)		Finnish FA (Suomen Palloliitto)	8th	Playoffs – QF
1991	Tier 1	Veikkausliiga (Premier League)		Finnish FA (Suomen Palloliitto)	3rd	
1992	Tier 1	Veikkausliiga (Premier League)		Finnish FA (Suomen Palloliitto)	6th	
1993	Tier 1	Veikkausliiga (Premier League)		Finnish FA (Suomen Palloliitto)	10th	Relegation Group – 4th
1994	Tier 1	Veikkausliiga (Premier League)		Finnish FA (Suomen Palloliitto)	6th	
1995	Tier 1	Veikkausliiga (Premier League)		Finnish FA (Suomen Palloliitto)	1st	Champions
1996	Tier 1	Veikkausliiga (Premier League)		Finnish FA (Suomen Palloliitto)	11th	Relegation Group – 11th – Relegated
1997	Tier 2	Ykkönen (First Division)	North Group	Finnish FA (Suomen Palloliitto)	1st	Upper Group – 1st – Champions – Promoted
1998	Tier 1	Veikkausliiga (Premier League)		Finnish FA (Suomen Palloliitto)	1st	Champions
1999	Tier 1	Veikkausliiga (Premier League)		Finnish FA (Suomen Palloliitto)	1st	Championship Group – 1st – Champions
2000	Tier 1	Veikkausliiga (Premier League)		Finnish FA (Suomen Palloliitto)	1st	Champions
2001	Tier 1	Veikkausliiga (Premier League)		Finnish FA (Suomen Palloliitto)	4th	
2002	Tier 1	Veikkausliiga (Premier League)		Finnish FA (Suomen Palloliitto)	3rd	Upper Group – 3rd
2003	Tier 1	Veikkausliiga (Premier League)		Finnish FA (Suomen Palloliitto)	2nd	
2004	Tier 1	Veikkausliiga (Premier League)		Finnish FA (Suomen Palloliitto)	1st	Champions
2005	Tier 1	Veikkausliiga (Premier League)		Finnish FA (Suomen Palloliitto)	4th	
2006	Tier 1	Veikkausliiga (Premier League)		Finnish FA (Suomen Palloliitto)	3rd	
2007	Tier 1	Veikkausliiga (Premier League)		Finnish FA (Suomen Palloliitto)	2nd	
2008	Tier 1	Veikkausliiga (Premier League)		Finnish FA (Suomen Palloliitto)	8th	
2009	Tier 1	Veikkausliiga (Premier League)		Finnish FA (Suomen Palloliitto)	6th	
2010	Tier 1	Veikkausliiga (Premier League)		Finnish FA (Suomen Palloliitto)	8th	
2011	Tier 1	Veikkausliiga (Premier League)		Finnish FA (Suomen Palloliitto)	10th	
2012	Tier 1	Veikkausliiga (Premier League)		Finnish FA (Suomen Palloliitto)	12th	Relegated
2013	Tier 2	Ykkönen (First Division)		Finnish FA (Suomen Palloliitto)	2nd	
2014	Tier 2	Ykkönen (First Division)		Finnish FA (Suomen Palloliitto)	5th	
2015	Tier 2	Ykkönen (First Division)		Finnish FA (Suomen Palloliitto)	6th	
2016	Tier 2	Ykkönen (First Division)		Finnish FA (Suomen Palloliitto)	7th	
2017	Tier 2	Ykkönen (First Division)		Finnish FA (Suomen Palloliitto)	6th	
2018	Tier 2	Ykkönen (First Division)		Finnish FA (Suomen Palloliitto)	5th	
2019	Tier 2	Ykkönen (First Division)		Finnish FA (Suomen Palloliitto)	1st	Champions – Promoted
2020	Tier 1	Veikkausliiga (Premier Division)		Finnish FA (Suomen Palloliitto)	10th	
2021	Tier 1	Veikkausliiga (Premier Division)		Finnish FA (Suomen Palloliitto)	8th	
2022	Tier 1	Veikkausliiga (Premier Division)		Finnish FA (Suomen Palloliitto)	4th	
2023	Tier 1	Veikkausliiga (Premier Division)		Finnish FA (Suomen Palloliitto)	9th	
2024	Tier 1	Veikkausliiga (Premier Division)		Finnish FA (Suomen Palloliitto)	6th	

- 67 seasons in Veikkausliiga
- 18 seasons in Ykkönen
- 1 seasons in Kakkonen

== Current squad ==
As of 3 September, 2026

Note: Flags indicate national team as defined under FIFA eligibility rules; some limited exceptions apply. Players may hold more than one non-FIFA nationality.

No.	Pos.	Nation	Player
1	GK	FIN	Jimi Ziprus
2	DF	FIN	Aaro Tiihonen
3	DF	FIN	Niklas Friberg
4	DF	FIN	Eero-Matti Auvinen
6	MF	NGR	Spencer Silas
7	FW	FIN	Thomas Lahdensuo
8	MF	FIN	Jesper Karlsson
9	FW	GHA	Torfiq Ali-Abubakar
10	DF	FIN	Aapo Mäenpää (on loan from Östers IF)
12	GK	FIN	Anton Lepola
13	MF	FIN	Miika Mahlamäki
15	MF	FIN	Matias Syrjäläinen
16	MF	FIN	Oiva Laaksonen

No.	Pos.	Nation	Player
17	MF	FIN	Roni Pietsalo
18	FW	FIN	Elias Mattila
19	FW	FIN	Niilo Martikainen
20	FW	GUI	Mamoudou Cissé
21	FW	FIN	Kevin Nurmi
23	MF	FIN	Topi Lehtinen
24	FW	GEO	Nika Sichinava
25	DF	FIN	Daniel Enqvist
26	FW	FIN	Oskari Paavola (on loan from Ilves)
30	DF	FIN	Valentin Purosalo
32	GK	FIN	Filip Slawuta
77	MF	NZL	Oliver Whyte

=== Out on loan ===
Note: Flags indicate national team as defined under FIFA eligibility rules; some limited exceptions apply. Players may hold more than one non-FIFA nationality.

No.	Pos.	Nation	Player
20	MF	FIN	Roni Rautio (at HJS Akatemia until 31 December 2026)

== Management and boardroom ==
=== Management ===
As of 15 February 2021

Name	Role
	Head Coach
(Portugal) Sander Guerreiro	Coach
(Finland) Mikko Manninen	Coach
(Finland) Pauli Jussila	Goalkeeping Coach
(Spain) Alejandro Peris Mora	Fitness Coach
(Finland) Janne Hannu	Fitness Coach
(Finland) Jonna Kauppinen	Team Manager
(Finland) Jari Jalava	Kit Manager
(Finland) Juuso Niemenpää	Doctor
(Finland) Kalle Myyrä	Masseur

=== Boardroom ===
As of 15 February 2021

Name	Role
(Finland) Marko Laaksonen	Chairman
(Finland) Olli Huttunen	CEO

== Managers ==
- (Finland) Jukka Vakkila (1982–84, 1986–87, 1993–96)
- (England) / (Finland) Keith Armstrong (January 1998 – December 2001)
- (Finland) Olli Huttunen (January 2002 – September 2009)
- (Finland) Sami Ristilä (September 2009 – August 2012)
- (Finland) Asko Jussila (August 2012 – September 2012)
- (Finland) Harri Kampman (November 2012 – June 2013)
- (Finland) Asko Jussila (June 2013 – July 2013)
- (Finland) Juho Rantala (July 2013 – December 2014)
- (Finland) Kari Martonen (January 2015 – September 2016)
- (Finland) Asko Jussila/ (Finland) Olli Huttunen (September 2016 – December 2016)
- (England) / (Finland) Keith Armstrong (January 2017 – December 2018)
- (Finland) Teemu Tainio (January 2019 – October 2023)
- (Northern Ireland) Andy Smith (October 2023 – 28 July 2025)
- (Finland) Kari Martonen (31 July 2025 - 9 December 2025)
- (Finland) Tommi Ekmark (9 December 2025 – present)
