= Tomi Petrescu =

Finnish footballer (born 1986)

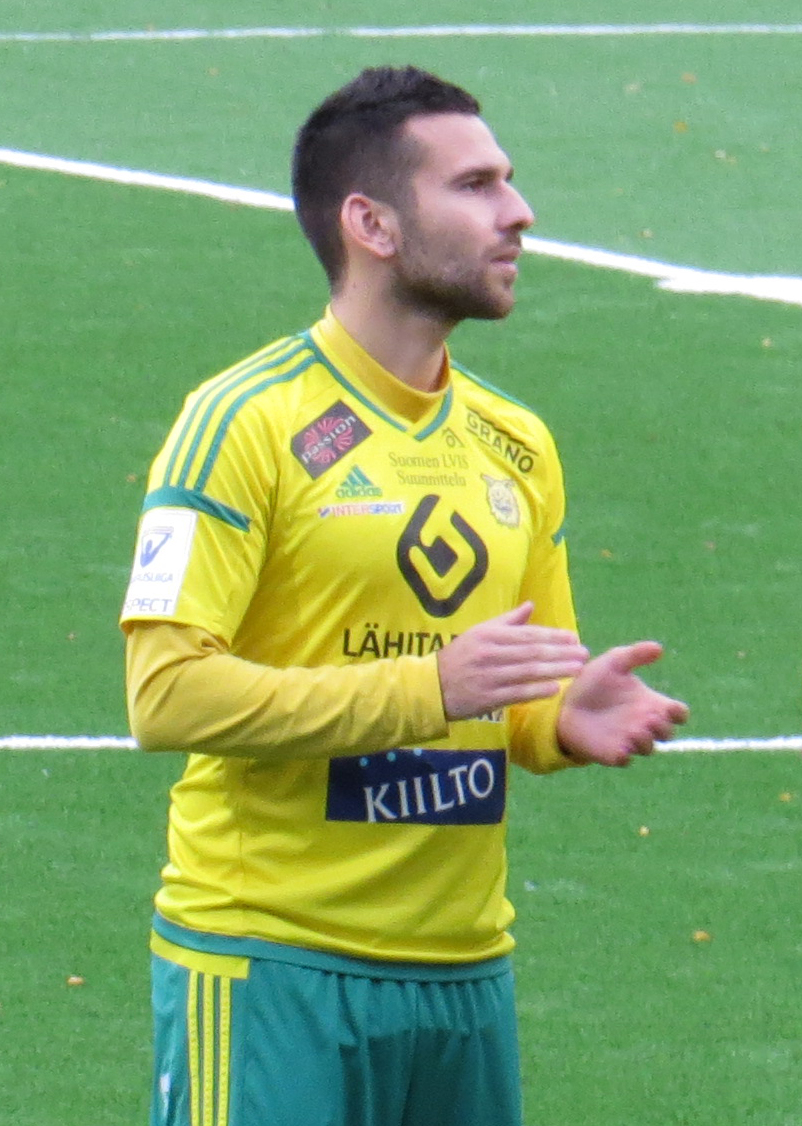

Personal information
- Date of birth: 24 June 1986 (age 40)
- Place of birth: Jyväskylä, Finland
- Height: 1.76 m (5 ft 9 in)
- Positions: Winger; attacking midfielder

Team information
- Current team: Jyväskylä Blackbird
- Number: 10

Youth career
- 1995–2001: JJK
- 2001–2004: Leicester City

Senior career*
| Years | Team | Apps | (Gls) |
| 2003–2005 | Leicester City | 1 | (0) |
| 2005–2006 | Inter Turku | 44 | (10) |
| 2007–2010 | Tampere United | 76 | (15) |
| 2009 | → Ascoli | 2 | (0) |
| 2011 | Panthrakikos | 1 | (0) |
| 2011–2012 | FC Honka | 32 | (2) |
| 2013 | FC Haka | 15 | (6) |
| 2013 | Politehnica Iași | 5 | (0) |
| 2014–2016 | Ilves | 52 | (9) |
| 2016–2018 | JJK | 40 | (7) |
| 2019– | Jyväskylä Blackbird | 0 | (0) |

International career^{‡}
| 2001–2003 | Finland U-17 | 25 | (2) |
| 2004–2008 | Finland U-21 | 7 | (2) |
Medal record
Tampere United
| Winner | Finnish Cup | 2007 |
| Winner | Veikkausliiga | 2007 |
| Winner | Finnish League Cup | 2009 |
| Runner-up | Finnish Cup | 2009 |
Honka
| Winner | Finnish League Cup | 2011 |
| Winner | Finnish Cup | 2012 |
Ilves
| Third place | Finnish 1st Division | 2014 |
- * Club domestic league appearances and goals as of 26 November 2021 ‡ National team caps and goals as of 24 March 2014

Tomi Petrescu (born 24 June 1986), is a Finnish professional football winger and attacking midfielder who plays for Finnish club Jyväskylä Blackbird and has represented Finland national under-21 football team. Petrescu was born in Jyväskylä, Finland where he played for the local JJK youth team before moving to Leicester City F.C.

== Club career ==
=== Early career ===
Petrescu's career began in the junior organisation of JJK Jyväskylä. In 2001, he moved to Leicester's youth academy. In Leicester he represented the academy team and the reserves. He made one appearance in the first team on 4 May 2003 in a match against Wolverhampton Wanderers. When he failed to make a break through he terminated his contract in the end of 2004.

=== Inter Turku ===
For season 2005 Petrescu joined Veikkausliiga team Inter Turku. where he quickly established his place in the midfield and scored seven goals during the season. During season 2006 he gained 20 caps and scored three goals.

=== Tampere United ===
In December 2006 Petrescu signed a two-year contract with Tampere United. He stated that his main reason to join Tampere United was coach Ari Hjelm. Season 2007 was a true break through for Petrescu to the elite of Veikkausliiga. He was one of the key players that led the team two a second consecutive championship. During the second qualifying round of the 2007/2008 Champions League edition, Petrescu scored a goal to help Tampere secure a prestigious 1:0 win against Bulgarian champions Levski Sofia in their home game. Tampere repeated the feat in the away game and became the first Finnish side to eliminate a Bulgarian club from the high-profile competition. However, the Finns were unable to qualify for the group stages of the Champions League, as they were eliminated by Norwegian side Rosenborg BK in the third qualifying round.

In 2007, he was selected as the best footballer of Pirkanmaa.

He was loaned to Italian Ascoli for the spring of 2009. In Ascoli he made his first appearance on 7 March in a match against Grosseto.

=== Panthrakikos ===
In January 2011 Petrescu joined Greek side Panthrakikos on a 1,5 years contract. He made just one appearance in the first team.

=== Honka ===
Petrescu represented seasons 2011-12 FC Honka in the Veikkausliiga. He gained 32 caps and scored two goals.

=== Haka ===
Petrescu transferred to FC Haka for the season 2013. During the fall of 2013 he made a short spell in Romanian first division side CSM Studențesc Iași.

=== Ilves ===
After season 2013 he moved on to Ilves on a three-year contract.

=== JJK ===
On 23 June 2016, he returned to JJK on a three-year contract.

== International career ==
Petrescu became well known after playing in the 2003 FIFA U-17 World Championship, which were held in Finland where he scored two of three goals of Finland. He scored a goal in the opening game against China in the tournament. He was nominated as candidate by head coach Markku Kanerva for the Finland U-21 team for the 2009 UEFA European Under-21 Championship finals but he suffered an injury one month prior to the tournament and was forced to withdraw.

== Personal life ==
Petrescu's father is Romanian and he has got an older brother, Ștefan Petrescu, who also plays football.

== Honours ==
=== Club ===
Tampere United

- Veikkausliiga: 2007
- Finnish Cup: 2007
- Finnish League Cup: 2009

Honka

- Finnish Cup: 2012
- Finnish League Cup: 2011

== Career statistics ==
=== Club ===
As of 2 April 2015

| Club | Season | Division | League | | Domestic Cups | | Europe | | Total | | | | |
| Club | Season | Division | Apps | Goals | Apps | Goals | Apps | Goals | Apps | Goals | | | |
|---|---|---|---|---|---|---|---|---|---|---|---|---|---|
Inter Turku
| Inter Turku | 2005 | Veikkausliiga | 24 | 7 | 0 | 0 | 0 | 0 | 24 | 7 | | | |
| Inter Turku | 2006 | Veikkausliiga | 20 | 3 | 0 | 0 | 0 | 0 | 20 | 3 | | | |
| Inter Turku Total | | | 44 | 10 | 0 | 0 | 0 | 0 | 44 | 10 | | | |
| Inter Turku Total | | | Tampere United | | | | | | | | | | |
| 2007 | Veikkausliiga | 24 | Tampere United | 6 | 0 | 0 | 6 | 2 | 30 | 8 | | | |
| 2008 | Veikkausliiga | 19 | Tampere United | 4 | 0 | 0 | 2 | 0 | 21 | 4 | | | |
Ascoli
| Ascoli | 2008–09 | Serie B | 2 | 0 | 0 | 0 | 0 | 0 | 2 | 0 | | | |
| Ascoli Total | | | 2 | 0 | 0 | 0 | 0 | 0 | 2 | 0 | | | |
| Ascoli Total | | | Tampere United | | | | | | | | | | |
| 2009 | Veikkausliiga | 13 | Tampere United | 3 | 0 | 0 | 0 | 0 | 13 | 3 | | | |
| 2010 | Veikkausliiga | 20 | Tampere United | 2 | 5 | 0 | 0 | 0 | 25 | 2 | | | |
| Tampere United Total | | | 76 | 15 | 5 | 0 | 8 | 2 | 89 | 17 | | | |
| Tampere United Total | | | Panthrakikos | | | | | | | | | | |
| 2010–11 | Football League | 1 | Panthrakikos | 0 | 0 | 0 | 0 | 0 | 1 | 0 | | | |
| Panthrakikos Total | | | 1 | 0 | 0 | 0 | 0 | 0 | 1 | 0 | | | |
| Panthrakikos Total | | | Honka | | | | | | | | | | |
| 2011 | Veikkausliiga | 11 | Honka | 2 | 0 | 0 | 0 | 0 | 24 | 7 | | | |
| 2012 | Veikkausliiga | 21 | Honka | 0 | 7 | 0 | 0 | 0 | 21 | 0 | | | |
| Honka Total | | | 32 | 2 | 7 | 0 | 0 | 0 | 39 | 2 | | | |
| Honka Total | | | Haka | | | | | | | | | | |
| 2012 | Ykkönen | 10 | Haka | 2 | 2 | 1 | 0 | 0 | 12 | 3 | | | |
| Haka Total | | | 10 | 2 | 2 | 1 | 0 | 0 | 12 | 3 | | | |
| Haka Total | | | Politehnica Iași | | | | | | | | | | |
| 2013–14 | Liga II | 5 | Politehnica Iași | 0 | 0 | 0 | 0 | 0 | 5 | 0 | | | |
| CSM Iași Total | | | 5 | 0 | 0 | 0 | 0 | 0 | 5 | 0 | | | |
| CSM Iași Total | | | Ilves | | | | | | | | | | |
| 2014 | Ykkönen | 21 | Ilves | 4 | 0 | 0 | 0 | 0 | 21 | 4 | | | |
| 2015 | Veikkausliiga | 0 | Ilves | 0 | 2 | 2 | 0 | 0 | 2 | 2 | | | |
| Ilves Total | | | 21 | 4 | 2 | 2 | 0 | 0 | 23 | 6 | | | |
| Ilves Total | | | Career Total | | | 191 | 33 | 14 | 3 | 8 | 2 | 213 | 38 |
