= Leo Kyllönen =

Finnish footballer (born 2004)

Personal information
- Date of birth: 22 January 2004 (age 22)
- Height: 1.80 m (5 ft 11 in)
- Position: Right-back

Team information
- Current team: Tampere United
- Number: 23

Youth career
- –2021: Ilves

Senior career*
Years	Team	Apps	(Gls)
2020–2023	Ilves II	50	(10)
2021–2023	Ilves	14	(0)
2024	KTP	5	(0)
2025	Jazz	25	(3)
2026–	Tampere United	25	(4)

International career^{‡}
2019	Finland U16	4	(0)
2021	Finland U18	1	(0)
- * Club domestic league appearances and goals as of 7 November 2026 ‡ National team caps and goals as of 00:38, 1 May 2022 (UTC)

Leo Kyllönen (born 22 January 2004) is a Finnish footballer who plays as a right-back for Ykkönen side Tampere United.

== Club career ==
Kyllönen started football with his hometown club Ilves in Tampere, and debuted in Veikkausliiga with Ilves first team in the 2021 season.

On 5 January 2024, Kyllönen signed a two-year deal with Ykkösliiga club KTP with an option for an additional year.

== Career statistics ==
As of 27 July 2026

Club	Season	League			Cup (Note: Appearances in the Suomen cup)		Europe		Other		Total	
Club	Season	Division	Apps	Goals	Apps	Goals	Apps	Goals	Apps	Goals	Apps	Goals
Ilves II	2020	Kakkonen	8	0	–		–		–		8	0
Ilves II	2021	Kakkonen	13	3	–		–		–		13	3
Ilves II	2022	Kakkonen	19	4	–		–		–		19	4
Ilves II	2023	Kakkonen	10	3	–		–		–		10	3
Ilves II	Total		50	10	0	0	0	0	0	0	50	10
Ilves	2021	Veikkausliiga	8	0	3	0	0	0	–		11	0
Ilves	2022	Veikkausliiga	3	0	2	0	–		1 (Note: Includes Finnish League Cup)	0	6	0
Ilves	2023	Veikkausliiga	3	0	2	0	–		2	0	7	0
Ilves	Total		14	0	7	0	0	0	3	0	24	0
KTP	2024	Ykkösliiga	5	0	3	0	–		4 (Note: Includes Ykkösliigacup)	0	12	0
Peli-Karhut (loan)	2024	Kolmonen	4	0	–		–		–		4	0
Jazz	2025	Ykkönen	25	3	3	0	–		–		28	3
Tampere United	2026	Ykkönen	15	2	1	0	–		–		16	2
Career total			113	15	14	0	0	0	7	0	134	15

== Honours ==
KTP

- Ykkösliiga: 2024

Ilves

- Finnish Cup: 2023
