= 2008 Finnish League Cup =

2008 Liigacup
Tournament details
- Country: Finland

Final positions
- Champions: FC Inter
- Runners-up: TPS

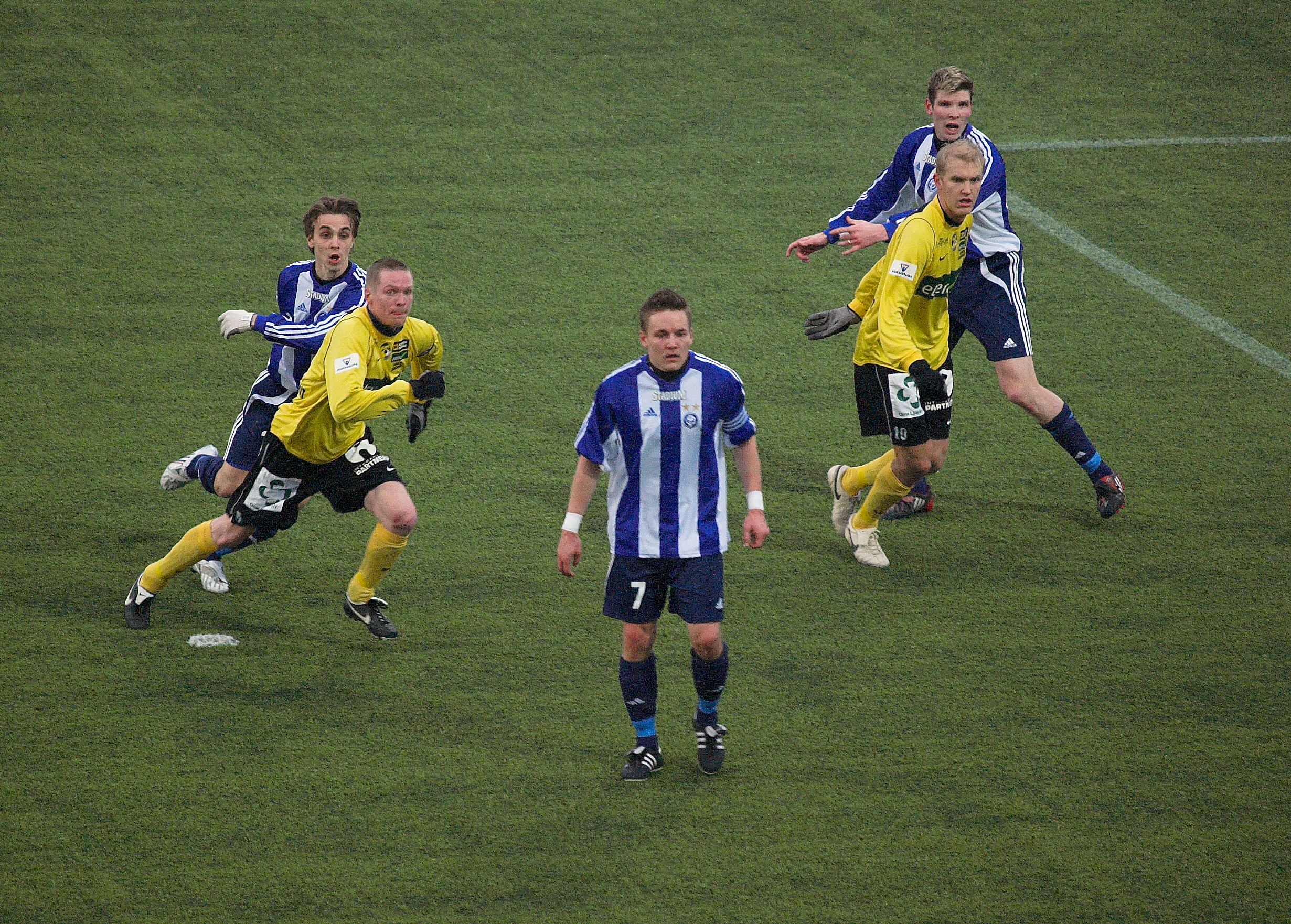

The 2008 Finnish League Cup was the 12th season of Finnish second most prestigious cup tournament. The competition started on 25 January 2008 and ended with the Final held on 12 April 2008. The defending champions FC Lahti lost in the semifinals, while last year's runners-up FC Inter eventually won the tournament.

The Cup consisted of two stages. First there was group stage that involved 14 Veikkausliiga teams divided into two groups. Top 4 teams from each group entered the one-legged elimination rounds – quarterfinals, semifinals and the final.

== Group stage ==
Every team played every other team of its group once, either home or away. The matches were played from 25 January to 24 March 2008.

=== Group 1 ===
Pos	Team	Pld	W	D	L	GF	GA	GD	Pts	HON	TPS	TAM	HJK	KPS	MYP	RPS
1	FC Honka	6	4	1	1	14	7	+7	13		4–0		2–2			4–1
2	TPS	6	4	1	1	11	7	+4	13			2–1		5–1	2–0	
3	Tampere United	6	4	0	2	14	6	+8	12	3–0					1–0	4–1
4	HJK	6	2	4	0	9	7	+2	10		1–1	2–1			2–2	
5	KuPS	6	2	0	4	6	14	−8	6	0–2		1–4	1–2			
6	MyPA	6	0	2	4	4	9	−5	2	1–2				1–2		0–0
7	RoPS	6	0	2	4	2	10	−8	2		0–1		0–0	0–1		

Source: rsssf.com
Rules for classification: 1) points; 2) goal difference; 3) number of goals scored.

=== Group 2 ===
Pos	Team	Pld	W	D	L	GF	GA	GD	Pts	LAH	INT	HAK	JAR	MAR	KTP	VPS
1	FC Lahti	6	5	1	0	18	5	+13	16		0–0		2–0		5–0	
2	FC Inter	6	4	1	1	13	1	+12	13			2–0			3–0	5–0
3	Haka	6	3	1	2	8	6	+2	10	1–2			3–1	2–1		
4	FF Jaro	6	3	0	3	11	11	0	9		1–0				6–4	3–0
5	IFK Mariehamn	6	2	1	3	10	12	−2	7	3–4	0–3		2–0			
6	FC KooTeePee	6	0	2	4	7	19	−12	2			0–2		1–1		2–2
7	VPS	6	0	2	4	5	18	−13	2	1–5		0–0		2–3		

Source: rsssf.com
Rules for classification: 1) points; 2) goal difference; 3) number of goals scored.

== Knockout stage ==
=== Quarter-finals ===
29 March 2008

FC Inter	0–0 (a.e.t.)	Tampere United
Penalties
	5–3

Veritas Stadion, Turku

29 March 2008

FC Honka	2–1	FF Jaro

Tapiolan Urheilupuisto, Espoo

30 March 2008

FC Lahti	1–0	HJK Helsinki

Lahden Stadion, Lahti

30 March 2008

TPS	3–2	FC Haka

Veritas Stadion, Turku

=== Semi-finals ===
5 April 2008

TPS	3–2	FC Lahti

Veritas Stadion, Turku

5 April 2008

FC Inter	4–2	FC Honka

Veritas Stadion, Turku

=== Final ===
12 April 2008

TPS	0–1	FC Inter

Veritas Stadion, Turku
