= Pekkanen =

Pekkanen is a Finnish surname. Notable people with the surname include:

- John Pekkanen (born 1939), American author and journalist
- Toivo Pekkanen (1902–1957), Finnish writer

== See also ==
- Pakkanen
