= Taha Özcelik =

Finnish footballer (born 2000)

Personal information
- Date of birth: 5 September 2000 (age 26)
- Place of birth: Finland
- Height: 1.85 m (6 ft 1 in)
- Position: Midfielder

Team information
- Current team: Tampere United
- Number: 17

Youth career
- TPV
- –2017: Ilves

Senior career*
Years	Team	Apps	(Gls)
2017–2022	Ilves II	46	(2)
2021	Ilves	15	(1)
2023–	Tampere United	85	(10)
- * Club domestic league appearances and goals as of 7 November 2026

Taha Özcelik (born 5 September 2000) is a Finnish footballer who plays as a midfielder for Tampere United in Ykkönen.

== Club career ==
Özcelik started football in the youth sector of Tampereen Pallo-Veikot (TPV) when aged nine, before joining Ilves.

Özcelik debuted in Veikkausliiga with Ilves first team in the 2021 season. He scored his first league goal on 23 June 2021, in a win against Inter Turku.

On 17 February 2023, Özcelik signed with fellow Tampere-based club Tampere United (TamU), competing in third-tier Kakkonen. On 19 December 2023, he extended his deal with TamU. At the end of the 2024 season, Özcelik helped TamU to win a promotion to third-tier Ykkönen, by beating HJS in the promotion play-offs.

== Personal life ==
Born in Finland, Özcelik is of Turkish descent, and holds a dual Finnish-Turkish citizenship. His brother Berkin Özcelik is also a footballer, playing for Ilves II reserve team.

== Career statistics ==
As of 22 October 2024.

Appearances and goals by club, season and competition
Club	Season	League			Cup (Note: Includes Suomen Cup)		League cup		Europe		Total	
Club	Season	Division	Apps	Goals	Apps	Goals	Apps	Goals	Apps	Goals	Apps	Goals
Ilves II	2017	Kolmonen	1	0	–		–		–		1	0
Ilves II	2018	Kolmonen	15	0	–		–		–		15	0
Ilves II	2019	Kakkonen	4	2	2	0	–		–		6	2
Ilves II	2020	Kakkonen	11	0	–		–		–		11	0
Ilves II	2021	Kakkonen	3	0	1	0	–		–		4	0
Ilves II	2022	Kakkonen	12	0	–		–		–		12	0
Ilves II	Total		46	2	3	0	0	0	0	0	49	2
Ilves	2021	Veikkausliiga	14	1	–		–		–		14	1
Tampere United	2023	Kakkonen	22	4	2	0	–		–		24	4
Tampere United	2024	Kakkonen	27	2	1	0	–		–		28	2
Tampere United	Total		49	6	3	0	0	0	0	0	52	6
Career total			109	9	6	0	0	0	0	0	115	9
