= Ilari Ruuth =

Finnish footballer (born 1990)

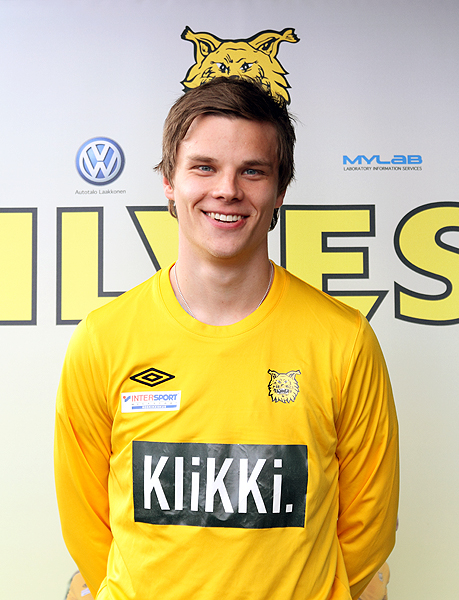

Personal information
- Date of birth: 27 August 1990 (age 36)
- Place of birth: Finland
- Height: 1.80 m (5 ft 11 in)
- Position: Defender

Team information
- Current team: Tampere United
- Number: 16

Youth career
- Ilves

Senior career*
Years	Team	Apps	(Gls)
2009–	Tampere United	13	(0)
2010	→ FC PoPa (loan)		
- * Club domestic league appearances and goals as of 12 October 2009

Ilari Ruuth (born 27 August 1990) is a Finnish footballer, who played most notably for Tampere United, in Veikkausliiga, the premier division of football in Finland. He is also a member of Finland national under-19 football team. Ruuth plays as a left back.
