= Pakkanen =

Pakkanen is a Finnish surname. Notable people with the surname include:

- Atte Pakkanen (1912–1994), Finnish politician
- Erkki Pakkanen (1930–1973), amateur lightweight boxer from Finland
- Santeri Pakkanen (born 1998), Finnish professional footballer
