= 2010 Finnish League Cup =

2010 Liigacup
Tournament details
- Country: Finland

Final positions
- Champions: FC Honka
- Runners-up: JJK

The 2010 Finnish League Cup was the 14th season of the Finnish League Cup, Finland's second-most prestigious cup football tournament.

The cup consisted of two stages. First there was group stage that involved 14 Veikkausliiga teams divided into two groups. The top four teams from each group entered the one-legged elimination rounds – quarter-finals, semi-finals and the final.

== Group stage ==
Every team played every other team of its group once, either home or away. The matches were played from 22 January to 27 March 2010.

=== Group 1 ===
| Pos | Team | Pld | W | D | L | GF | GA | GD | Pts | ACO | JJK | VPS | JAR | KPS | TAM | HAK |
|---|---|---|---|---|---|---|---|---|---|---|---|---|---|---|---|---|
| 1 | AC Oulu | 6 | 4 | 1 | 1 | 11 | 4 | +7 | 13 | | | | 3–2 | 0–0 | | 2–0 |
| 2 | JJK | 6 | 3 | 1 | 2 | 8 | 6 | +2 | 10 | 1–3 | | 3–0 | 1–1 | | | |
| 3 | VPS | 6 | 3 | 1 | 2 | 5 | 4 | +1 | 10 | 1–0 | | | | 3–0 | 1–0 | |
| 4 | FF Jaro | 6 | 2 | 2 | 2 | 6 | 6 | 0 | 8 | | | 0–0 | | 1–0 | | 2–0 |
| 5 | KuPS | 6 | 2 | 1 | 3 | 5 | 7 | −2 | 7 | | 3–1 | | | | 3–1 | 0–1 |
| 6 | Tampere United | 6 | 2 | 0 | 4 | 6 | 9 | −3 | 6 | 0–3 | 0–1 | | 2–0 | | | |
| 7 | Haka | 6 | 2 | 0 | 4 | 3 | 8 | −5 | 6 | | 0–1 | 1–0 | | | 1–3 | |

Source: soccerway.com
Legend: Blue = home team win; Yellow = draw; Red = away team win.
Rules for classification: 1) points; 2) goal difference; 3) number of goals scored.

=== Group 2 ===
| Pos | Team | Pld | W | D | L | GF | GA | GD | Pts | HJK | INT | HON | TPS | MYP | MAR | LAH |
|---|---|---|---|---|---|---|---|---|---|---|---|---|---|---|---|---|
| 1 | HJK | 6 | 3 | 2 | 1 | 11 | 9 | +2 | 11 | | 1–1 | | | 1–0 | 2–0 | |
| 2 | FC Inter | 6 | 3 | 2 | 1 | 5 | 4 | +1 | 11 | | | 0–0 | | 1–0 | 2–1 | |
| 3 | FC Honka | 6 | 2 | 3 | 1 | 10 | 7 | +3 | 9 | 3–3 | | | 2–1 | | | 4–1 |
| 4 | TPS | 6 | 3 | 0 | 3 | 8 | 5 | +3 | 9 | 1–2 | 2–0 | | | | | 1–0 |
| 5 | MYPA | 6 | 3 | 0 | 3 | 4 | 6 | −2 | 9 | | | 1–0 | 0–3 | | 2–0 | |
| 6 | IFK Mariehamn | 6 | 2 | 1 | 3 | 5 | 8 | −3 | 7 | | | 1–1 | 1–0 | | | 2–1 |
| 7 | FC Lahti | 6 | 1 | 0 | 5 | 6 | 10 | −4 | 3 | 4–1 | 0–1 | | | 0–1 | | |

Source: soccerway.com
Legend: Blue = home team win; Yellow = draw; Red = away team win.
Rules for classification: 1) points; 2) goal difference; 3) number of goals scored.

== Knockout stage ==
=== Quarter-finals ===
31 March 2010

| JJK | 2–2 (a.e.t.) | TPS |
Penalties
| | 4–2 |

31 March 2010

| HJK | 1–3 | FF Jaro |

31 March 2010

| VPS | 1–2 | FC Inter |

31 March 2010

| Oulu | 1–1 (a.e.t.) | FC Honka |
Penalties
| | 7–8 |

=== Semi-finals ===
7 April 2010

| FC Honka | 2–0 | FC Inter |

7 April 2010

| JJK | 1–0 | FF Jaro |

=== Final ===
10 April 2010

| FC Honka | 0–0 | JJK |
Penalties
| | 4–3 |
