= 2026 Ykkönen =

Ykkönen
- Season: 2026
- Dates: 2 April 2026 – 18 October 2026
- Champions: Tampere United
- Promoted: RoPS; Tampere United
- Relegated: KPV; KuPS Akatemia

The 2026 Ykkönen was the third season of Ykkönen in its current format as the third tier of Finnish football, and the 55th season of the Ykkönen name overall since its inception in 1973. The season began on the 2nd of April 2026 and ended on 18 October 2026.

== Teams ==
Twelve teams compete in the league. Following the 2025 season, MP (champions) were promoted to the Ykkösliiga. They were replaced by SalPa, who were relegated from the second tier. EPS and Atlantis were relegated to Kakkonen and replaced by the 2025 Kakkonen champions, TPV and VJS.

=== Stadiums and locations ===
Location of teams in 2026 Ykkönen

The following teams are participating in the 2026 Ykkönen season.

Club	Location	Stadium	Capacity	Manager
Inter Turku II	Turku	Veritas Stadion	9,372	(Finland) Vesa Vasara
Jazz	Pori	UK-Tekonurmi		(Finland) Ville Ulanen
JJK Jyväskylä	Jyväskylä	Harjun stadion	5,000	(Scotland) Brian Page
KPV	Kokkola	Kokkolan keskuskenttä	3,000	(Portugal) Alexandre Ferreira Ribeiro
KuPS Akatemia	Kuopio	Väre Areena	5,000	(Finland) Jarkko Wiss
OLS	Oulu	Castrén	2,500	(Finland) Mikko Mannila
PKKU	Tuusula, Kerava, Järvenpää	Kalevan Urheilupuisto	2,500	(Finland) Rami Hakanpää
RoPS	Rovaniemi	Rovaniemen keskuskenttä	2,803	(Finland) Jari Alamäki
SalPa	Salo	Salon Urheilupuisto	1,000	(France) Adda Benamar
Tampere United	Tampere	Tammelan Stadion	8,017	(Finland) Topi Priha
TPV	Tampere	Kauppi 3	1,000	(Sweden) Sebastian Bowles
VJS	Vantaa	Myyrmäen jalkapallostadion	4,320	(Finland) Petri Hyrkkänen

== Regular season ==
=== League table ===
Pos	Team	Pld	W	D	L	GF	GA	GD	Pts	Qualification
1	Tampere United	22	13	5	4	47	18	+29	44	Qualification for the Promotion Round
2	RoPS	22	11	7	4	47	32	+15	40	Qualification for the Promotion Round
3	SalPa	22	10	6	6	41	35	+6	36	Qualification for the Promotion Round
4	PK Keski-Uusimaa	22	9	8	5	40	30	+10	35	Qualification for the Promotion Round
5	OLS	22	9	7	6	43	35	+8	34	Qualification for the Promotion Round
6	JJK Jyväskylä	22	8	7	7	51	42	+9	31	Qualification for the Promotion Round
7	VJS	22	7	10	5	38	31	+7	31	Qualification for the Relegation Round
8	Jazz	22	9	6	7	32	29	+3	30 (Note: Jazz were deducted three points for unpaid wages.)	Qualification for the Relegation Round
9	TPV	22	6	6	10	30	40	−10	24	Qualification for the Relegation Round
10	Inter Turku II	22	5	5	12	32	51	−19	20	Qualification for the Relegation Round
11	KuPS Akatemia	22	3	6	13	37	51	−14	15	Qualification for the Relegation Round
12	KPV	22	4	3	15	24	68	−44	15	Qualification for the Relegation Round

Source: Soccerway
Rules for classification: 1) Points; 2) Goal difference; 3) Goals scored; 4) Head-to-head points; 5) Head-to-head goal difference; 6) Head-to-head away goals scored; 7) Play-off
(Note: Play-off is only played if needed to decide champion, teams for relegation or UEFA competition and will be played on a neutral ground).

=== Results ===
Home \ Away	INT	JAZ	JJK	KPV	KPS	OLS	PKK	RPS	SAL	TAM	TPV	VJS
Inter Turku II	—	1–1	3–5	2–3	4–2	1–1	2–1	0–2	1–2	0–2	0–1	1–1
Jazz	2–0	—	0–2	0–1	2–2	1–1	1–5	2–1	1–2	0–1	4–0	1–1
JJK Jyväskylä	11–1	1–3	—	4–1	4–4	1–0	1–3	3–3	2–2	0–0	2–1	2–2
KPV	4–2	0–2	2–3	—	2–4	0–4	1–3	1–1	3–0	0–6	1–3	1–2
KuPS Akatemia	0–1	1–2	1–2	4–1	—	2–4	2–2	0–1	1–3	2–3	3–0	2–2
OLS	1–3	1–2	2–1	2–1	2–2	—	2–0	3–3	5–0	2–1	4–2	1–0
PK Keski-Uusimaa	1–0	2–1	2–2	2–2	3–0	1–1	—	0–2	2–0	4–4	2–2	1–3
RoPS	3–2	2–2	4–0	7–0	2–1	1–1	4–3	—	2–2	0–1	1–0	2–0
SalPa	2–3	0–2	2–1	6–0	4–3	4–1	0–1	1–1	—	2–0	4–2	2–2
Tampere United	2–2	4–0	1–0	6–0	4–0	3–0	0–0	4–0	0–1	—	1–1	0–4
TPV	1–1	0–2	1–0	0–0	3–1	2–2	0–2	6–3	1–1	0–3	—	3–1
VJS	3–2	1–1	4–4	5–0	0–0	4–3	0–0	0–2	1–1	0–1	2–1	—

Source: Soccerway
Legend: Blue = home team win; Yellow = draw; Red = away team win.

== Promotion Round ==
The top six teams from the regular season enter the Promotion Round, where they play each other once more. Points from the regular season are carried over. The winner is promoted directly to the Ykkösliiga, while the runners-up advance to a two-legged playoff against the ninth-placed team of the Ykkösliiga.

=== League table ===
Pos	Team	Pld	W	D	L	GF	GA	GD	Pts	Promotion or qualification
1	Tampere United (C, P)	27	16	6	5	60	27	+33	54	Promotion to the Ykkösliiga
2	RoPS (O, P)	27	13	9	5	59	39	+20	48	Qualification for the Ykkösliiga play-off
3	SalPa	27	14	6	7	59	47	+12	48	
4	OLS	27	11	8	8	52	41	+11	41	
5	PK Keski-Uusimaa	27	10	8	9	47	47	0	38	
6	JJK Jyväskylä	27	9	7	11	62	61	+1	34	

Source: Soccerway
Rules for classification: 1) Points; 2) Goal difference; 3) Goals scored; 4) Head-to-head points; 5) Head-to-head goal difference; 6) Head-to-head away goals scored; 7) Play-off
(Note: Play-off is only played if needed to decide champion, teams for relegation or UEFA competition and will be played on a neutral ground).
(C) Champions; (O) Play-off winners; (P) Promoted

=== Results ===
Home \ Away	JJK	OLS	PKK	RPS	SAL	TAM
JJK Jyväskylä	—	1–3	6–2	—	—	—
OLS	—	—	3–0	—	—	0–1
PK Keski-Uusimaa	—	—	—	3–1	0–4	—
RoPS	6–1	1–1	—	—	3–1	—
SalPa	4–3	3–2	—	—	—	6–4
Tampere United	4–0	—	3–2	1–1	—	—

Source: Soccerway
Legend: Blue = home team win; Yellow = draw; Red = away team win.

== Relegation Round ==
The bottom six teams from the regular season enter the Relegation Round, where they play each other once more. Points from the regular season are carried over. The bottom two teams are relegated to the Kakkonen.

=== League table ===
Pos	Team	Pld	W	D	L	GF	GA	GD	Pts	Relegation
1	VJS	27	12	10	5	48	34	+14	46	
2	Jazz	27	11	7	9	41	40	+1	37	
3	Inter Turku II	27	8	6	13	46	55	−9	30	
4	TPV	27	8	6	13	40	50	−10	30	
5	KPV (R)	27	5	4	18	28	80	−52	19	Relegation to the Kakkonen
6	KuPS Akatemia (R)	27	3	7	17	44	65	−21	16	Relegation to the Kakkonen

Source: Soccerway
Rules for classification: 1) Points; 2) Goal difference; 3) Goals scored; 4) Head-to-head points; 5) Head-to-head goal difference; 6) Head-to-head away goals scored; 7) Play-off
(Note: Play-off is only played if needed to decide champion, teams for relegation or UEFA competition and will be played on a neutral ground).
(R) Relegated

=== Results ===
Home \ Away	INT	JAZ	KPV	KPS	TPV	VJS
Inter Turku II	—	6–1	—	—	3–0	—
Jazz	—	—	3–0	2–2	—	0–2
KPV	1–1	—	—	3–2	—	—
KuPS Akatemia	0–3	—	—	—	—	1–2
TPV	—	1–3	4–0	4–2	—	—
VJS	2–1	—	2–0	—	2–1	—

Source: Soccerway
Legend: Blue = home team win; Yellow = draw; Red = away team win.

== Season statistics ==
=== Top scorers ===
Rank	Player	Club	Goals

=== Top assist ===
Rank	Player	Club	Assist

== Awards ==
=== Annual awards ===
Award	Winner	Club
Player of the Year		
Goalkeeper of the Year		
Defender of the Year		
Midfielder of the Year		
Striker of the Year		
