= 2011 Finnish League Cup =

2011 Liigacup
Tournament details
- Country: Finland

Final positions
- Champions: FC Honka
- Runners-up: Tampere United

The 2011 Finnish League Cup is the 15th season of the Finnish League Cup, Finland's second-most prestigious cup football tournament. FC Honka are the defending champions, having won their first league cup last year.

The cup consists of two stages. First there will be a group stage that involves the 14 Veikkausliiga teams divided into two groups. The top four teams from each group will enter the one-legged elimination rounds – quarter-finals, semi-finals and the final.

== Group stage ==
Every team will play every other team of its group once, either home or away. The matches will be played from 18 January to 15 March 2011.

=== Group 1 ===
Pos	Team	Pld	W	D	L	GF	GA	GD	Pts	TAM	JJK	KPS	JAR	RPS	ACO	VPS
1	Tampere United (A)	6	2	4	0	10	8	+2	10		3–2		1–1		2–1	
2	JJK (A)	6	2	3	1	14	13	+1	9			4–4	1–0			0–0
3	KuPS (A)	6	2	2	2	11	9	+2	8	1–1				1–2		3–0
4	FF Jaro (A)	6	2	2	2	10	9	+1	8			1–2			4–0	2–2
5	RoPS	6	2	1	3	11	16	−5	7	1–1	5–6		2–5			
6	AC Oulu	6	2	1	3	6	10	−4	7		1–1	1–0		0–1		
7	VPS	6	1	3	2	9	10	−1	6	2–2				3–0	2–3	

Source: table soccerway.com and matches soccerway.com
Legend: Blue = home team win; Yellow = draw; Red = away team win.
Rules for classification: 1) points; 2) head-to-head points; 3) head-to-head goal difference; 4) head-to-head goals scored; 5) goal difference; 6) number of goals scored.
(A) Advance to a further round

=== Group 2 ===
Pos	Team	Pld	W	D	L	GF	GA	GD	Pts	HON	HJK	INT	TPS	MAR	MYP	HAK
1	FC Honka (A)	6	5	1	0	20	12	+8	16					3–1	5–3	4–2
2	HJK (A)	6	4	2	0	14	4	+10	14	1–1				4–0	2–1	
3	FC Inter (A)	6	3	2	1	12	6	+6	11	3–4	1–1			1–0		
4	TPS (A)	6	3	0	3	7	10	−3	9	2–3	1–3	0–4				
5	IFK Mariehamn	6	2	0	4	9	9	0	6				0–1		4–0	4–0
6	MYPA	6	1	1	4	10	15	−5	4			2–2	1–2			3–0
7	Haka	6	0	0	6	2	15	−13	0		0–3	0–1	0–2			

Source: table soccerway.com and matches soccerway.com
Legend: Blue = home team win; Yellow = draw; Red = away team win.
Rules for classification: 1) points; 2) head-to-head points; 3) head-to-head goal difference; 4) head-to-head goals scored; 5) goal difference; 6) number of goals scored.
(A) Advance to a further round

== Knockout stage ==
=== Quarter-finals ===
19 March 2011

FC Honka	2–0	FF Jaro
Äijälä 28'; Väyrynen 89'

Tapiolan Urheilupuisto, Espoo
Referee: Jouni Hyytiä

19 March 2011

Tampere United	1–0	TPS
Lahtinen 68'

Pirkkahalli, Tampere
Referee: Dennis Antamo

19 March 2011

HJK	4–3	KuPS
Ring 27'; Sadik 33' (pen.); Bah 68'; Pukki 76'		12' Nykänen; 55', 79' Udah

Sonera Stadium, Helsinki
Referee: Mattias Gestranius

19 March 2011

JJK	1–1	FC Inter
Gruborovics 50' (pen.)		78' Ojala
Penalties
	6–5

Vehkalampi 2 tekonurmi, Jyväskylä
Referee: Vesa Hätilä

=== Semi-finals ===
23 March 2011

FC Honka	2–1	JJK
Äijälä 68', 73'		75' Hyyrynen

Tapiolan Urheilupuisto, Espoo
Referee: Dennis Antamo

2 April 2011

Tampere United	0–0	HJK
Penalties
	3–0

Pirkkahalli, Tampere
Referee: Mattias Gestranius

=== Final ===
23 April 2011

FC Honka	3–0	Tampere United
Otaru 20'; Savage 67' 76'

Tapiolan Urheilupuisto, Espoo
Referee: Pohjoismäki
