= 2009 Finnish League Cup =

2009 Liigacup
Tournament details
- Country: Finland

Final positions
- Champions: Tampere United
- Runners-up: HJK

The 2009 Finnish League Cup was the 13th season of the Finnish League Cup, Finland's second-most prestigious cup football tournament.

The cup consisted of two stages. First there was group stage that involved 14 Veikkausliiga teams divided into two groups. The top four teams from each group entered the one-legged elimination rounds – quarter-finals, semi-finals and the final.

== Group stage ==
Every team played every other team of its group once, either home or away. The matches were played from 25 January to 24 March 2009.

=== Group 1 ===
Pos	Team	Pld	W	D	L	GF	GA	GD	Pts	TAM	MAR	TPS	LAH	INT	JJK	RPS
1	Tampere United	6	4	2	0	17	6	+11	14				5–0	5–2		2–0
2	IFK Mariehamn	6	4	2	0	14	8	+6	14	2–2		2–1	3–3			
3	TPS	6	3	2	1	9	4	+5	11	0–0					3–1	3–0
4	FC Lahti	6	2	3	1	8	10	−2	9			1–1			1–0	2–0
5	FC Inter	6	2	1	3	8	9	−1	7		1–2	0–1	1–1			
6	JJK	6	0	1	5	5	12	−7	1	2–3	0–2			1–2		
7	RoPS	6	0	1	5	2	14	−12	1		1–3			0–3	1–1	

Source: rsssf.com
Rules for classification: 1) points; 2) goal difference; 3) number of goals scored.

=== Group 2 ===
Pos	Team	Pld	W	D	L	GF	GA	GD	Pts	HJK	HON	VPS	JAR	MYP	HAK	KPS
1	HJK	6	6	0	0	14	3	+11	18		3–0		1–0	2–1		
2	FC Honka	6	5	0	1	15	4	+11	15				2–0		1–0	7–0
3	VPS	6	3	0	3	8	8	0	9	1–2	1–4			1–0		
4	FF Jaro	6	2	1	3	9	7	+2	7			0–2			1–1	3–1
5	MYPA	6	2	0	4	7	12	−5	6		0–1		0–5			3–1
6	Haka	6	1	1	4	6	9	−3	4	0–2		2–0		2–3		
7	KuPS	6	1	0	5	5	21	−16	3	1–4		0–3			2–1	

Source: rsssf.com
Rules for classification: 1) points; 2) goal difference; 3) number of goals scored.

== Knockout stage ==
=== Quarter-finals ===
21 March 2009

Tampere United	1–0	Jaro

21 March 2009

FC Honka	2–2 (a.e.t.)	TPS
Penalties
	3–5

21 March 2009

HJK	2–2	FC Lahti
Penalties
	5–3

21 March 2009

IFK Mariehamn	3–1	VPS

=== Semi-finals ===
4 April 2009

Tampere United	2–1	TPS

4 April 2009

HJK	3–1	IFK Mariehamn

=== Final ===
15 April 2009

Tampere United	2–0	HJK
