= Jarkko Wiss =

Finnish footballer and manager (born 1972)

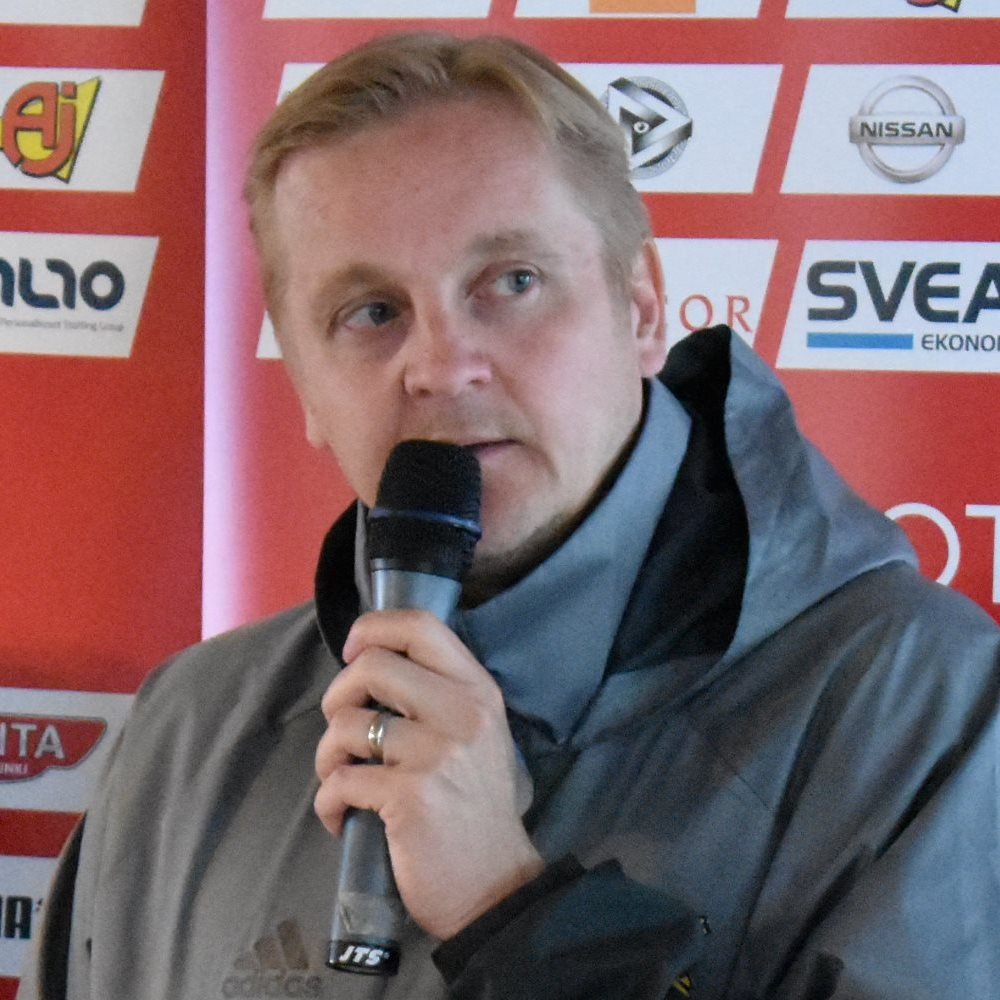
- Wiss as head coach of Ilves in 2017

Personal information
- Full name: Jarkko Wiss
- Date of birth: 17 April 1972 (age 54)
- Place of birth: Tampere, Finland
- Height: 1.82 m (5 ft 11 1/2 in)
- Position: Defensive midfielder

Team information
- Current team: SJK (manager)

Senior career*
Years	Team	Apps	(Gls)
1991–1995	TPV	105	(8)
1996	Jaro	25	(1)
1997–1998	HJK	52	(8)
1999	Molde	3	(0)
1999	Lillestrøm	16	(4)
2000	Moss	17	(6)
2000–2001	Stockport County	41	(6)
2002–2004	Hibernian	48	(0)
2004–2007	Tampere United	90	(16)
Total		397	(49)

International career
1996–2007	Finland	43	(3)

Managerial career
- 2008–2009: Tampere United (sporting director)
- 2009: Finland U16
- 2011: Tampere United
- 2014: Finland U17
- 2014: Finland U18
- 2015: Finland U19
- 2016–2021: Ilves
- 2023: Inter Turku
- 2024–2025: KuPS
- 2026–: SJK
- * Club domestic league appearances and goals

Jarkko Wiss (born 17 April 1972) is a Finnish football manager and a former international footballer, who is currently the head coach of SJK. During his playing career, Wiss won four Finnish championship titles with Tampereen Pallo-Veikot, HJK Helsinki, and twice with Tampere United. He was capped 43 times for the Finland national team during 1996–2007. As a manager, he led KuPS to the 2025 Veikkausliiga title before joining SJK for the 2026 season.

== Playing career ==
As a player, he played in the position of defensive midfielder for TPV Tampere, FF Jaro, HJK and Tampere United in Finland, Molde, Lillestrøm and Moss in Norway, before joining Stockport County in England for a £350,000 transfer fee, as well as for Hibernian in Scotland. He was known for his powerful shots with both feet and as a hard tackler.

When playing for HJK, Wiss represented the club in the 1998–99 UEFA Champions League group stage.

=== International career ===
During 1996–2007, Wiss made over 40 appearances for the Finnish national team.

== Coaching career ==
After retiring in 2007 at the age of 35, he worked both as a youth coach and as a sporting director for Tampere United between 2008 and 2009. He also managed the Finnish under-15 football team.

On 29 October 2010 it was announced that Wiss had succeeded the longtime head coach Ari Hjelm at Tampere United. He signed a two-year contract, with an option for a two-year extension, with the club on the same day. However, the club was banned from competition for the 2011 season.

Wiss was the manager of Finland national under-18 football team since 1 January 2014.

On 6 November 2015 it was announced that Wiss is taking the head coach position at Ilves starting on 1 January 2016.

On 23 September 2022, Wiss signed a contract with Inter Turku as a manager for 2023 and 2024 seasons, with an option for an additional year. On 6 November 2023, after one season with the club, Wiss was fired due to a harassment incident.

On 13 August 2024, it was reported in Finnish media that Wiss would start as the new manager of Kuopion Palloseura (KuPS) for the 2025 Veikkausliiga season, a move the club confirmed two days later. Tomi Erola, the CEO of KuPS, stated that the club's values were made clear to Wiss, emphasizing that the club believed no one should be judged definitively for past mistakes. His tenure in Kuopio culminated in a highly successful 2025 season, where he guided the club the Veikkausliiga title, characterized by a dominant defensive record throughout the campaign. Despite the championship success, the club announced in November 2025 that Wiss would depart at the end of the year following the conclusion of his contract.

=== SJK ===
On 21 December 2025, it was officially announced that Wiss would take over as the head coach of SJK for the 2026 season. He was tasked with rebuilding the squad to challenge for European spots, bringing in a wealth of experience from his previous championship-winning seasons. His first official matches with SJK took place in the 2026 Liigacup during the pre-season winter months.

== Career statistics ==
=== Club ===
As of 1 September 2024.

Appearances and goals by club, season and competition
Club	Season	League			Cup (Note: Includes Suomen Cup)		League cup (Note: Includes EFL League Cup and Scottish League Cup)		Europe		Total	
Club	Season	Division	Apps	Goals	Apps	Goals	Apps	Goals	Apps	Goals	Apps	Goals
TPV	1991	Kakkonen	12	1	–		–		–		12	1
TPV	1992	Ykkönen	20	1	–		–		–		20	1
TPV	1993	Veikkausliiga	25	0	–		–		–		25	0
TPV	1994	Veikkausliiga	23	3	–		–		–		23	3
TPV	1995	Veikkausliiga	25	3	–		–		2 (Note: Appearances in UEFA Cup)	1	27	4
TPV	Total		105	8	0	0	0	0	2	1	107	9
Jaro	1996	Veikkausliiga	25	1	–		–		3 (Note: Appearances in UEFA Intertoto Cup)	0	28	1
HJK Helsinki	1997	Veikkausliiga	26	5	–		–		2 (Note: Appearances in UEFA Cup Winners' Cup)	0	28	5
HJK Helsinki	1998	Veikkausliiga	26	3	–		–		5 (Note: Appearances in UEFA Champions League)	1	31	4
HJK Helsinki	Total		52	8	0	0	0	0	7	1	59	9
Molde	1999	Tippeligaen	3	0	–		–		–		3	0
Lillestrøm	1999	Tippeligaen	16	4	–		–		–		16	4
Moss	2000	Tippeligaen	17	6	–		–		–		17	6
Stockport County	2000–01	First Division	30	6	3	1	1	0	–		34	7
Stockport County	2001–02	First Division	11	0	0	0	2	0	–		13	0
Stockport County	Total		41	6	3	1	3	0	0	0	46	7
Hibernian	2001–02	Scottish Premier League	11	0	–		–		–		11	0
Hibernian	2002–03	Scottish Premier League	24	0	0	0	1	0	–		25	0
Hibernian	2003–04	Scottish Premier League	13	0	0	0	0	0	–		13	0
Hibernian	Total		48	6	0	0	1	0	0	0	49	6
Tampere United	2004	Veikkausliiga	24	4	–		–		6	2	30	6
Tampere United	2005	Veikkausliiga	23	5	–		–		6	1	29	6
Tampere United	2006	Veikkausliiga	24	5	–		–		4	1	28	6
Tampere United	2007	Veikkausliiga	19	2	–		–		6 (Note: Appearances in UEFA Champions League and UEFA Cup)	1	25	3
Tampere United	Total		90	16	0	0	0	0	22	5	112	21
Career total			397	49	3	1	4	0	34	7	438	57

=== International ===
As of match played 12 September 2007

Finland
Year	Apps	Goals
1996	2	0
1997	6	0
1998	7	1
1999	3	1
2000	11	0
2001	3	0
2002	5	1
2003	0	0
2004	0	0
2005	3	0
2006	1	0
2007	2	0
Total	43	3

=== International goals ===
As of match played 4 January 2002. Finland score listed first, score column indicates score after each Wiss goal.

List of international goals scored by Jarkko Wiss
No.	Date	Venue	Opponent	Score	Result	Competition
1	25 March 1998	National Stadium, Ta' Qali, Ta' Qali, Malta	Malta	2–0	2–0	Friendly
2	18 August 1999	Jan Breydel Stadium, Brugge, Belgium	Belgium	1–0	4–3	Friendly
3	4 January 2002	Bahrain National Stadium, Riffa, Bahrain	Bahrain	2–0	2–0	Friendly

=== Managerial record ===
As of 20 January 2026

Team	Nat	From	To	Record				
Team	Nat	From	To	P	W	D	L	W%
Ilves	(Finland)	1 January 2016	17 August 2021	205	96	47	62	46.83
Inter Turku	(Finland)	1 January 2023	6 November 2023	37	15	6	16	40.54
KuPS	(Finland)	1 January 2025	31 December 2025	57	31	14	12	54.39
SJK	(Finland)	1 January 2026	Present	0	0	0	0	—
Total				299	142	67	90	47.49

== Honours ==
Tampere United

- Veikkausliiga: 2006, 2007
- Finnish Cup: 2007

HJK

- Veikkausliiga: 1997
- UEFA Champions League participant: 1998–99

TPV

- Veikkausliiga: 1994

== Managerial honours ==
KuPS

- Veikkausliiga: 2025

Ilves

- Finnish Cup: 2019

Individual

- Veikkausliiga Manager of the Month:
  - September 2016
  - August 2017
  - June 2023
  - August 2025
  - October 2025
- Veikkausliiga Manager of the Year: 2025
