= Tampereen Pallo-Veikot =

Finnish football club

TPV
- Full name: Tampereen Pallo-Veikot ry
- Nicknames: Paltsarit; Punakone (The Red Machine)
- Founded: 6 April 1930; 96 years ago
- Ground: Kauppi Football Stadium
- Capacity: 1,000
- Chairman: Jouni Kaikuranta
- Manager: Sebastian Bowles
- League: Ykkönen
- 2026: Ykkönen, 10th of 12
- Website: tpv.jopox.fi
Home colours	Away colours

Tampereen Pallo-Veikot (TPV) is a Finnish football club based in Tampere. The club plays in Ykkönen, the third highest level of football in Finland. TPV is one of the biggest football clubs in the Pirkanmaa region with its 901 registered players as of 2025. TPV has won one Finnish championship title in 1994.

== History ==
Tampereen Pallo-Veikot was founded in 1930 as a general sports club for workers. TPV played its first football match on 16 May 1930 against Tampereen Kisatoverit, and managed to win the district championship in their first season. In the 1932 season TPV won its first Finnish Worker's Sports Federation (TUL) football championship. Before the 1950s the clubs of the Finnish Workers' Sports Federation, such as TPV, played in their own leagues that were not connected to the Football Association of Finland. Tampereen Pallo-Veikot won the Finnish Workers' Sports Federation championship six times.

Between 1930s and 1960s, TPV also had bandy, boxing and ice hockey sections, but nowadays TPV is purely a football club. In the 1960s TPV played three seasons at the highest level of Finnish ice hockey, but eventually disbanded its ice hockey section in 1969.

TPV joined the Finnish FA in 1955 and competed in the top tier of the Finnish football league system for five seasons: in 1971, 1993–1995 and 1999. The most successful year was 1994 when the club won the Finnish Championship, but the next season the club was relegated to Ykkönen.

In July 1998 TPV merged together with another Tampere club Ilves. A new club called Tampere United (TamU) was created. However, TPV left the merger soon after its creation and continued playing as its own team. In 1999 the club regained its Veikkausliiga status, but this only lasted for one season. In 2002 TPV had to abandon its place in the second tier Ykkönen due to bankruptcy.

The club was promoted back to Ykkönen in 2006 and stayed there for four seasons before being relegated to the third tier Kakkonen again. Finally in 2018 TPV defeated Myllykosken Pallo -47 in Kakkonen Promotion Playoffs and was promoted back to the second tier Ykkönen.

TPV managed to stay in Ykkönen only for the 2019 season and was once again relegated to Kakkonen. The club played in Kakkonen for two seasons, the 2020 and 2021 seasons, until it was once again relegated, this time to Kolmonen. The club played in Kolmonen for two seasons and gained promotion after the 2023 season. TPV played in Kakkonen for the 2024 and 2025 seasons and gained promotion to Ykkönen after the 2025 season.

Markus Räikkönen, ex-husband of Finnish Prime Minister Sanna Marin played in the club between 2006 and 2009.

== Honours ==
Veikkausliiga

- Champions: 1994

== European record ==
Year	Competition	Round	Opponent	Results
1995/1996	UEFA Cup	1Q	(Norway) Viking Stavanger	0–4, 1–3, Jarkko Wiss

== Season to season ==
Season to season of TPV

Season	Level	Division	Section	Administration	Position	Movements
1948	Tier 2	Suomensarja (Second Division)	North Group	Finnish FA (Suomen Palloliitto)	11th	Relegated
1949-53 TUL Leagues
1954	Tier 3	Maakuntasarja (Third Division)	Central Group III	Finnish FA (Suomen Palloliitto)	2nd	
1955	Tier 3	Maakuntasarja (Third Division)	West Group II	Finnish FA (Suomen Palloliitto)	2nd	
1956	Tier 3	Maakuntasarja (Third Division)	West Group I	Finnish FA (Suomen Palloliitto)	2nd	
1957	Tier 3	Maakuntasarja (Third Division)	West Group II	Finnish FA (Suomen Palloliitto)	1st	Promoted
1958	Tier 2	Suomensarja (Second Division)	West Group	Finnish FA (Suomen Palloliitto)	5th	
1959	Tier 2	Suomensarja (Second Division)	West Group	Finnish FA (Suomen Palloliitto)	2nd	
1960	Tier 2	Suomensarja (Second Division)	North Group	Finnish FA (Suomen Palloliitto)	3rd	
1961	Tier 2	Suomensarja (Second Division)	West Group	Finnish FA (Suomen Palloliitto)	12th	Relegated
1962	Tier 3	Maakuntasarja (Third Division)	Group 6 Tampere & Satakunta	Finnish FA (Suomen Palloliitto)	2nd	
1963	Tier 3	Maakuntasarja (Third Division)	Group 3 Tampere & Satakunta	Finnish FA (Suomen Palloliitto)	1st	Promoted
1964	Tier 2	Suomensarja (Second Division)	West Group	Finnish FA (Suomen Palloliitto)	9th	
1965	Tier 2	Suomensarja (Second Division)	West Group	Finnish FA (Suomen Palloliitto)	7th	
1966	Tier 2	Suomensarja (Second Division)	West Group	Finnish FA (Suomen Palloliitto)	4th	
1967	Tier 2	Suomensarja (Second Division)	West Group	Finnish FA (Suomen Palloliitto)	4th	
1968	Tier 2	Suomensarja (Second Division)	West Group	Finnish FA (Suomen Palloliitto)	2nd	Promotion Group 4th
1969	Tier 2	Suomensarja (Second Division)	West Group	Finnish FA (Suomen Palloliitto)	1st	Promotion Group 4th
1970	Tier 2	II divisioona (Second Division)	West Group	Finnish FA (Suomen Palloliitto)	1st	Promoted
1971	Tier 1	Mestaruussarja (Premier League)		Finnish FA (Suomen Palloliitto)	11th	Relegation Group 4th - Relegated
1972	Tier 2	II divisioona (Second Division)	West Group	Finnish FA (Suomen Palloliitto)	6th	Failed to qualify to new I Divisioona
1973	Tier 3	II divisioona (Second Division)	West Group	Finnish FA (Suomen Palloliitto)	5th	
1974	Tier 3	II divisioona (Second Division)	West Group	Finnish FA (Suomen Palloliitto)	6th	
1975	Tier 3	II divisioona (Second Division)	West Group	Finnish FA (Suomen Palloliitto)	2nd	
1976	Tier 3	II divisioona (Second Division)	West Group	Finnish FA (Suomen Palloliitto)	2nd	
1977	Tier 3	II divisioona (Second Division)	West Group	Finnish FA (Suomen Palloliitto)	6th	
1978	Tier 3	II divisioona (Second Division)	West Group	Finnish FA (Suomen Palloliitto)	4th	
1979	Tier 3	II divisioona (Second Division)	West Group	Finnish FA (Suomen Palloliitto)	8th	
1980	Tier 3	II divisioona (Second Division)	West Group	Finnish FA (Suomen Palloliitto)	11th	Relegated
1981	Tier 4	III Divisioona (Third Division)	Group 5 - Tampere & Central Finland	Tampere District (SPL Tampere)	3rd	
1982	Tier 4	III Divisioona (Third Division)	Group 5 - Tampere & Central Finland	Tampere District (SPL Tampere)	1st	Promotion Playoff - Promoted
1983	Tier 3	II divisioona (Second Division)	West Group	Finnish FA (Suomen Palloliitto)	2nd	Promotion Playoff
1984	Tier 3	II divisioona (Second Division)	West Group	Finnish FA (Suomen Palloliitto)	5th	
1985	Tier 3	II divisioona (Second Division)	East Group	Finnish FA (Suomen Palloliitto)	1st	Promoted
1986	Tier 2	I divisioona (First Division)		Finnish FA (Suomen Palloliitto)	3rd	
1987	Tier 2	I divisioona (First Division)		Finnish FA (Suomen Palloliitto)	8th	
1988	Tier 2	I divisioona (First Division)		Finnish FA (Suomen Palloliitto)	12th	Relegated
1989	Tier 3	II divisioona (Second Division)	West Group	Finnish FA (Suomen Palloliitto)	3rd	
1990	Tier 3	II divisioona (Second Division)	West Group	Finnish FA (Suomen Palloliitto)	5th	
1991	Tier 3	II divisioona (Second Division)	West Group	Finnish FA (Suomen Palloliitto)	1st	Promoted
1992	Tier 2	I divisioona (First Division)		Finnish FA (Suomen Palloliitto)	1st	Promoted
1993	Tier 1	Veikkausliiga (Premier League)		Finnish FA (Suomen Palloliitto)	5th	Championship Group – 6th
1994	Tier 1	Veikkausliiga (Premier League)		Finnish FA (Suomen Palloliitto)	1st	Champions
1995	Tier 1	Veikkausliiga (Premier League)		Finnish FA (Suomen Palloliitto)	12th	Relegated
1996	Tier 2	Ykkönen (First Division)	North Group	Finnish FA (Suomen Palloliitto)	2nd	
1997	Tier 2	Ykkönen (First Division)	North Group	Finnish FA (Suomen Palloliitto)	2nd	Promotion Group – 5th
1998	Tier 2	Ykkönen (First Division)	North Group	Finnish FA (Suomen Palloliitto)	5th	Promotion Group – 4th – Promoted
1999	Tier 1	Veikkausliiga (Premier League)		Finnish FA (Suomen Palloliitto)	12th	Relegation Group – 12th – Relegated
2000	Tier 2	Ykkönen (First Division)	North Group	Finnish FA (Suomen Palloliitto)	3rd	Promotion Group – 10th
2001	Tier 2	Ykkönen (First Division)	North Group	Finnish FA (Suomen Palloliitto)	5th	Withdrew from Ykkönen for 2002
2002	Tier 3	Kakkonen (Second Division)	West Group	Finnish FA (Suomen Palloliitto)	1st	Play-offs
2003	Tier 3	Kakkonen (Second Division)	West Group	Finnish FA (Suomen Palloliitto)	2nd	
2004	Tier 3	Kakkonen (Second Division)	West Group	Finnish FA (Suomen Palloliitto)	2nd	
2005	Tier 3	Kakkonen (Second Division)	East Group	Finnish FA (Suomen Palloliitto)	2nd	
2006	Tier 3	Kakkonen (Second Division)	Group B	Finnish FA (Suomen Palloliitto)	1st	Promoted
2007	Tier 2	Ykkönen (First Division)		Finnish FA (Suomen Palloliitto)	11th	
2008	Tier 2	Ykkönen (First Division)		Finnish FA (Suomen Palloliitto)	9th	
2009	Tier 2	Ykkönen (First Division)		Finnish FA (Suomen Palloliitto)	11th	
2010	Tier 2	Ykkönen (First Division)		Finnish FA (Suomen Palloliitto)	12th	Relegated
2011	Tier 3	Kakkonen (Second Division)	Group B	Finnish FA (Suomen Palloliitto)	9th	
2012	Tier 3	Kakkonen (Second Division)	West Group	Finnish FA (Suomen Palloliitto)	6th	
2013	Tier 3	Kakkonen (Second Division)	West Group	Finnish FA (Suomen Palloliitto)	2nd	
2014	Tier 3	Kakkonen (Second Division)	West Group	Finnish FA (Suomen Palloliitto)	4th	
2015	Tier 3	Kakkonen (Second Division)	South Group	Finnish FA (Suomen Palloliitto)	4th	
2016	Tier 3	Kakkonen (Second Division)	Group B	Finnish FA (Suomen Palloliitto)	2nd	
2017	Tier 3	Kakkonen (Second Division)	Group B	Finnish FA (Suomen Palloliitto)	5th	
2018	Tier 3	Kakkonen (Second Division)	Group C	Finnish FA (Suomen Palloliitto)	1st	Promotion - Playoffs – Promoted
2019	Tier 2	Ykkönen (First Division)		Finnish FA (Suomen Palloliitto)	10th	Relegated
2020	Tier 3	Kakkonen (Second Division)	Group B	Finnish FA (Suomen Palloliitto)	10th	
2021	Tier 3	Kakkonen (Second Division)	Group B	Finnish FA (Suomen Palloliitto)	12th	Relegated
2022	Tier 4	Kolmonen (Third Division)	Western Group B	Tampere District (SPL Tampere)	2nd	
2023	Tier 4	Kolmonen (Third Division)	Group 5 - Tampere & Central Finland	Tampere District (SPL Tampere)	1st	Promoted
2024	Tier 4	Kakkonen (Second Division)	Group B	Finnish FA (Suomen Palloliitto)	6th	
2025	Tier 4	Kakkonen (Second Division)	Group B	Finnish FA (Suomen Palloliitto)		

- 5 seasons in Veikkausliiga
- 27 seasons in Ykkönen
- 36 seasons in Kakkonen
- 4 seasons in Kolmonen

== Current squad 2026 ==
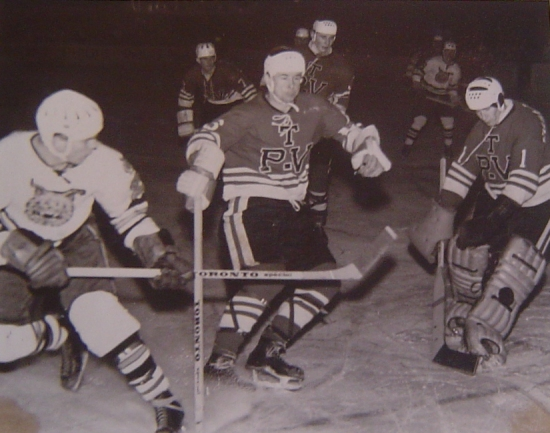
Ice hockey match Ilves against TPV in 1960s

Championship party of Tampereen Pallo-Veikot in 1994

Note: Flags indicate national team as defined under FIFA eligibility rules; some limited exceptions apply. Players may hold more than one non-FIFA nationality.

No.	Pos.	Nation	Player
1	GK	POL	Juliusz Pazio
2	DF	FIN	Aleksi Rantanen
4	DF	FIN	Eino-Veikko Ek
6	MF	FIN	Sebastian Kruusimaa
7	FW	FIN	Antti Kujala
8	MF	FIN	Berkin Özcelik
9	FW	FIN	Eemil Mäentakanen
11	FW	FIN	Roope Kostiainen
12	GK	FIN	Niko Pienmunne
13	DF	FIN	Ville Puustinen
15	FW	FIN	Eric Bullock
16	MF	FIN	Vikke-Valtteri Anttila
17	DF	FIN	Juuso Yli-Rajala

No.	Pos.	Nation	Player
18	MF	FIN	Elmeri Riikonen
19	FW	FIN	Mohammad Akbal
20	FW	FIN	Lamin Jadama
23	GK	FIN	Mico Syrjälä
24	MF	FIN	Ossi Rättäri
25	DF	FIN	Juho Mattila (Captain)
26	DF	FIN	Santeri Pitkäkoski
27	FW	FIN	Toni Toijala
28	MF	FIN	Jasi Kinnunen
33	DF	FIN	Kasper Kylen
34	FW	FIN	Samuli Sipilä
56	MF	FIN	Tomi Ylinen
77	DF	FIN	Viljami Veltti
