= Santeri Pakkanen =

Finnish footballer (born 1998)

Personal information
- Date of birth: 7 May 1998 (age 28)
- Height: 1.90 m (6 ft 3 in)
- Position: Goalkeeper

Youth career
- Lahti

Senior career*
Years	Team	Apps	(Gls)
2016–2017	Lahti Akatemia	16	(0)
2016–2018	Lahti	9	(0)
2018	→ PKUU (loan)	2	(0)
- * Club domestic league appearances and goals as of 17 January 2019

Santeri Pakkanen (born 7 May 1998) is a Finnish professional footballer who most recently played for Lahti, as a goalkeeper.

== Career ==
Pakkanen has played for Lahti and Lahti Akatemia.
