= FC Honka =

Finnish football club

Honka
- Full name: FC Honka
- Founded: 1957
- Ground: Tapiolan Urheilupuisto, Espoo
- Capacity: 6,000
- Manager: Mika Väyrynen
- League: Ykkönen
- 2026: Kakkonen Group B, 1st of 10 (promoted via play-offs)
- Website: fchonka.fi
| Home colours | Away colours |

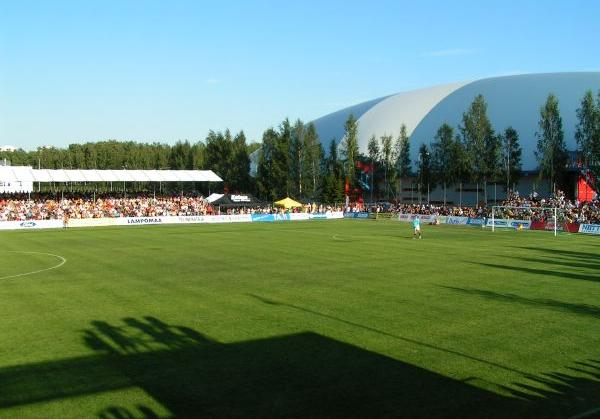
Tapiolan Urheilupuisto in 2007

FC Honka is a Finnish football club based in Espoo. It was founded in 1957 as Tapion Honka, and changed its name to FC Honka in 1975. The club previously played in the Finnish premier division (Veikkausliiga), having been promoted for the first time in their history at the end of the 2005 season. It plays its home matches at the Tapiolan Urheilupuisto.

FC Honka is largely renowned in Finland for its extensive youth scheme with over 1,000 youth players playing in various age groups. It also has a women's team in the Kansallinen Liiga.

== History ==
Until 2005 FC Honka was thought of as a "nearly, but not quite" team, a promising but always underachieving side in the Finnish First Division (Ykkönen). In the late 1990s the objective was promotion, but year after year they failed. At the beginning of the 21st century FC Honka almost went bankrupt but was saved at the last moment. In early 2005 the club was taken over by Jouko Pakarinen and Jouko Harjunpää, who had a plan to turn FC Honka from underachievers to a UEFA Champions League candidate.

In the first year of their take-over of FC Honka, the new management succeeded in assembling a squad which won the First Division (Ykkönen) with ease and also made the semi-finals of the Finnish Cup where they eventually lost 1–0 to FC Haka.

FC Honka was able to fight for top positions instantly, but narrowly missed the top three in their first two seasons. In 2007 the team reached the Finnish Cup final, losing to Tampere United on penalties after extra time. As Tampere United also won the league title that season, FC Honka qualified for the 2008–09 UEFA Cup. In 2008, FC Honka achieved its highest place by finishing 2nd in the league.

=== Financial difficulties ===
FC Honka won the Finnish Cup in 2012. However, due to financial difficulties the team was relegated to the third tier Kakkonen in 2015. In 2015 the fitness center company Esport bought the club and after that, the club has also been known as Esport Honka. The club dominated their first season in the Kakkonen in 2015 and lost only two games, but were defeated in the promotion battle. After the 2016 season, the team was promoted to the second tier Finnish First Division (Ykkönen). After the 2017 Ykkönen season Honka was promoted to the highest Finnish tier (Veikkausliiga) after Promotion playoffs against HIFK.

=== Financial problems again and the bankruptcy ===
On 31 October 2023, it was widely reported in Finnish media, that with no prior announcement or warning, Honka hadn't paid the salaries for the staff or the players on time. Kurt Möller, the head of development and public relations of Esport, the company currently running the club, stated that Esport Honka had run out of money. On 5 November 2023, it was further reported that the severe financial difficulties might force Honka into bankruptcy, as it's probable that the owner Färid Ainetdin is not willing to keep covering the annual losses of millions of euros anymore. Möller or Hexi Arteva, the General Manager of the club, did not comment on the reports in media.

On 8 November 2023, it was reported that the General Manager Hexi Arteva had resigned from his job two days earlier, with no announcement or comments.

On 10 November 2023, it was reported that Honka is unable to fulfill the requirements for the league license of Veikkausliiga and will not play in the top tier in the 2024 season. Henri Aalto, the former captain of Honka who announced his retirement from his professional career after the 2023 season, criticized the club in an interview with Yle: "Every time, when Honka faces financial difficulties, I am frustrated by how poorly things are communicated and solved with the players, coaches and the rest of the staff. Nothing is announced beforehand. And when something negative happens, even then you have to be the one asking for information and to live in uncertainty."

On 15 November 2023, when Honka wasn't able to get a league license for the second or the third tier, Henri Aalto commented on a case again to Finnish media. The players and the staff were still yet to get their salaries and bonuses. Foreign-born players are still stuck in the country clueless of the future. The owner Färid Ainetdin hasn't commented a word on the situation, and no one has managed to get a contact to him.

Finally on 16 November 2023, Färid Ainetdin spoke to a small free local newspaper Länsiväylä. He stated that the reason for the sudden cutting of funding of the club, is the long delay in the new stadium project in Tapiola, and he is not ready to fund the club for four more years and waiting for the possible new stadium to be built and completed. According to Ainetdin, there are no financial conditions for Honka to keep playing in any of the three highest tiers of Finnish football. He also wishes that the players would get their salaries soon via insurance. On the same day, Esport Honka filed for bankruptcy at the Court of Länsi-Uusimaa. On 21 November 2023, Esport Honka was declared for bankruptcy.

=== 2024: New era ===
On 16 November 2023, after Esport Honka had filed for bankruptcy, the club, FC Honka ry, announced that Honka will continue playing in Kakkonen, which will be the fourth-tier division starting in 2024. Honka will gain the division position of its former reserve team Honka II, and use the name Honka Akatemia. On 24 November 2023, the club announced that Mika Väyrynen will be the new first team head coach.

== Honours ==
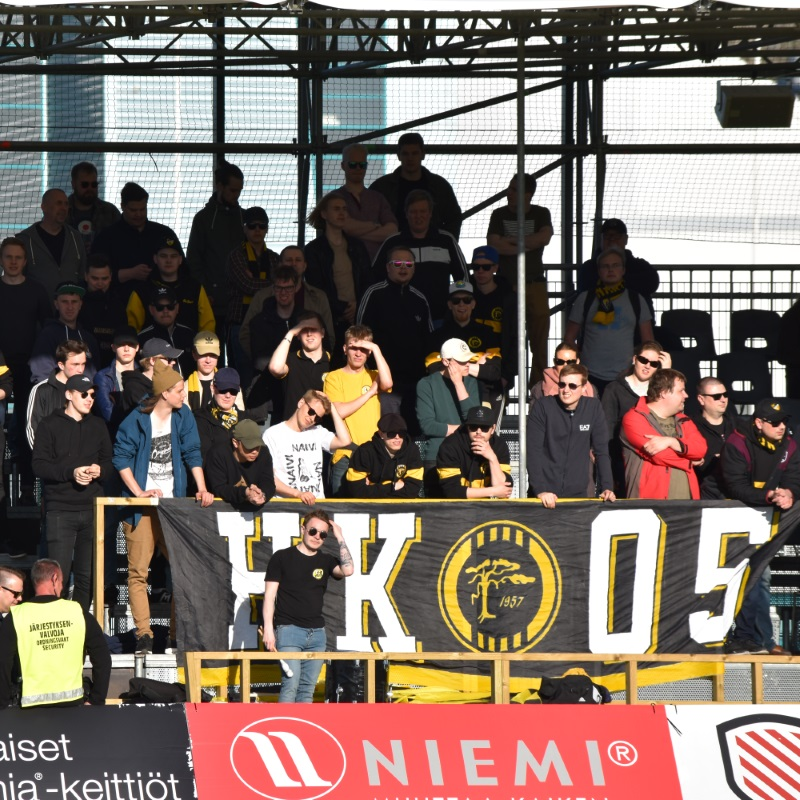
FC Honka fans

=== League ===
Veikkausliiga

- Runners-up (3): 2008, 2009, 2013

Ykkönen

- Champions: 2005

=== Cups ===
Finnish Cup

- Winners (1): 2012
- Runners-up (4): 1969, 2007, 2008, 2023

Finnish League Cup

- Winners (3): 2010, 2011, 2022

== European competitions ==
As runners-up in the 2007 Finnish Cup to Tampere United, who had also won the league title, FC Honka qualified for the 2008–09 UEFA Cup, beating the Icelandic club ÍA 4–2 in the 1st qualifying round and the Norwegian club Viking in the 2nd. In the first round of actual competition, they were drawn against Racing Santander and lost 0–2 on aggregate.

Next year, Honka qualified for the new UEFA Europa League, starting from the second qualifying round. The club beat Welsh side Bangor City F.C. 3–0 on aggregate but lost 1–3 to FK Karabakh from Azerbaijan in the third qualifying round.

For the 2010–11 season, FC Honka was again drawn against Bangor City in the second round but lost 3–2 on aggregate.

During the winter of 2009, Honka won the annual La Manga Cup, beating FC Nordsjælland in the final.

=== European cups record ===
| Competition | Pld | W | D | L | GF | GA |
|---|---|---|---|---|---|---|
| UEFA Europa League / UEFA Cup | 17 | 5 | 3 | 9 | 14 | 21 |
| UEFA Europa Conference League | 6 | 1 | 3 | 2 | 5 | 5 |
| UEFA Intertoto Cup | 4 | 1 | 3 | 0 | 7 | 5 |
| Total | 27 | 7 | 9 | 11 | 26 | 31 |

=== Matches ===
| Season | Competition | Round | Club | Home | Away | Aggregate |
|---|---|---|---|---|---|---|
| 2007 | UEFA Intertoto Cup | First round | (Estonia) TVMK | 0–0 | 4–2 | 4–2 |
| 2007 | UEFA Intertoto Cup | Second round | (Denmark) AaB | 2–2 | 1–1 | 3–3 (a) |
| 2008–09 | UEFA Cup | First qualifying round | (Iceland) IA Akranes | 3–0 | 1–2 | 4–2 |
| 2008–09 | UEFA Cup | Second qualifying round | (Norway) Viking Stavanger | 0–0 | 2–1 | 2–1 |
| 2008–09 | UEFA Cup | First round | (Spain) Racing Santander | 0–1 | 0–1 | 0–2 |
| 2009–10 | UEFA Europa League | Second qualifying round | (Wales) Bangor City | 2–0 | 1–0 | 3–0 |
| 2009–10 | UEFA Europa League | Third qualifying round | (Azerbaijan) Qarabağ FK | 0–1 | 1–2 | 1–3 |
| 2010–11 | UEFA Europa League | Second qualifying round | (Wales) Bangor City | 1–1 | 1–2 | 2–3 |
| 2011–12 | UEFA Europa League | First qualifying round | (Estonia) JK Nõmme Kalju | 0–0 | 2–0 | 2–0 |
| 2011–12 | UEFA Europa League | Second qualifying round | (Sweden) BK Häcken | 0–2 | 0–1 | 0–3 |
| 2013–14 | UEFA Europa League | Second qualifying round | (Poland) Lech Poznań | 1–3 | 1–2 | 2–5 |
| 2014–15 | UEFA Europa League | First qualifying round | (Estonia) Sillamäe Kalev | 3–2 | 1–2 | 4–4 (a) |
| 2020–21 | UEFA Europa League | First qualifying round | (Denmark) AGF | —N/a | 2–5 | —N/a |
| 2021–22 | UEFA Europa Conference League | First qualifying round | (Faroe Islands) NSÍ Runavík | 0–0 | 3–1 | 3–1 |
| 2021–22 | UEFA Europa Conference League | Second qualifying round | (Slovenia) Domžale | 0–1 | 1–1 | 1–2 |
| 2023–24 | UEFA Europa Conference League | First qualifying round | (Kazakhstan) Tobol | 0–0 | 1–2 | 1–2 |

=== UEFA club ranking ===
This is the UEFA Club Ranking As of June 2021, including season 2013–14.

Last update: 22 June 2021

| Rank | Team | Points |
|---|---|---|
| 397 | (Northern Ireland) Ballymena United FC | 1.391 |
| 398 | (Northern Ireland) Glenavon FC | 1.391 |
| 399 | (Georgia (country)) FC Dinamo Batumi | 1.375 |
| 400 | (Moldova) FC Dinamo-Auto Tiraspol | 1.375 |
| 400 | (Finland) FC Honka | 1.375 |
| 402 | (Moldova) Speranța Nisporeni | 1.375 |
| 403 | (Finland) FC Lahti | 1.375 |
| 404 | (Finland) IFK Mariehamn | 1.375 |
| 405 | (Finland) VPS Vaasa | 1.375 |

== Transfers ==
Honka have produced numerous young players for Veikkausliiga and for transfers abroad. When playing in Veikkausliiga, Honka have also sold young Finnish and international players abroad.

=== Record transfers ===
| Rank | Player | To | Fee | Year |
|---|---|---|---|---|
| 1. | (Finland) Agon Sadiku | (Norway) Rosenborg | €660,000 | 2025 |
| 2. | (Finland) Hermanni Vuorinen | (Norway) Fredrikstad | €600,000 | 2006 |
| 3. | (Angola) Rui Modesto | (Sweden) AIK | €500,000 | 2023 |
| 3. | (Finland) Niklas Pyyhtiä | (Italy) Bologna | €500,000 | 2021 |
| 5. | (Finland) Tomi Maanoja | (Sweden) AIK | €450,000 | 2008 |

== Season to season ==
Season to Season

| Season | Level | Division | Section | Administration | Position | Movements |
|---|---|---|---|---|---|---|
| 1964 | Tier 4 | Aluesarja (Fourth Division) | Group 1 Helsinki & Central Uusimaa | Helsinki & Uusimaa (SPL Uusimaa) | 4th | |
| 1965 | Tier 4 | Aluesarja (Fourth Division) | Group 2 Helsinki & Central Uusimaa | Helsinki & Uusimaa (SPL Uusimaa) | 1st | Promoted |
| 1966 | Tier 3 | Maakuntasarja (Third Division) | Helsinki | Finnish FA (Suomen Palloliitto) | 2nd | |
| 1967 | Tier 3 | Maakuntasarja (Third Division) | Helsinki & Uusimaa | Finnish FA (Suomen Palloliitto) | 1st | Promoted |
| 1968 | Tier 2 | Suomensarja (Second Division) | South Group | Finnish FA (Suomen Palloliitto) | 8th | |
| 1969 | Tier 2 | Suomensarja (Second Division) | South Group | Finnish FA (Suomen Palloliitto) | 3rd | |
| 1970 | Tier 2 | II Divisioona (Second Division) | East Group | Finnish FA (Suomen Palloliitto) | 7th | |
| 1971 | Tier 2 | II Divisioona (Second Division) | East Group | Finnish FA (Suomen Palloliitto) | 4th | |
| 1972 | Tier 2 | II Divisioona (Second Division) | East Group | Finnish FA (Suomen Palloliitto) | 8th | |
| 1973 | Tier 3 | II Divisioona (Second Division) | East Group | Finnish FA (Suomen Palloliitto) | 3rd | |
| 1974 | Tier 3 | II Divisioona (Second Division) | East Group | Finnish FA (Suomen Palloliitto) | 12th | Relegated |
| 1975 | Tier 4 | III Divisioona (Third Division) | Group 2 | Helsinki & Uusimaa (SPL Uusimaa) | 2nd | |
| 1976 | Tier 4 | III Divisioona (Third Division) | Group 2 | Helsinki & Uusimaa (SPL Uusimaa) | 5th | |
| 1977 | Tier 4 | III Divisioona (Third Division) | Group 1 | Helsinki & Uusimaa (SPL Uusimaa) | 1st | Promoted |
| 1978 | Tier 3 | II Divisioona (Second Division) | East Group | Finnish FA (Suomen Palloliitto) | 1st | Promoted |
| 1979 | Tier 2 | I Divisioona (First Division) | | Finnish FA (Suomen Palloliitto) | 10th | Relegation Group 6th – Relegation Playoff |
| 1980 | Tier 2 | I Divisioona (First Division) | | Finnish FA (Suomen Palloliitto) | 7th | Relegation Group 1st |
| 1981 | Tier 2 | I Divisioona (First Division) | | Finnish FA (Suomen Palloliitto) | 4th | Promotion Group 7th |
| 1982 | Tier 2 | I Divisioona (First Division) | | Finnish FA (Suomen Palloliitto) | 5th | Relegation Group 1st |
| 1983 | Tier 2 | I Divisioona (First Division) | | Finnish FA (Suomen Palloliitto) | 11th | Relegation Group 6th – Relegated |
| 1984 | Tier 3 | II Divisioona (Second Division) | East Group | Finnish FA (Suomen Palloliitto) | 6th | |
| 1985 | Tier 3 | II Divisioona (Second Division) | West Group | Finnish FA (Suomen Palloliitto) | 6th | |
| 1986 | Tier 3 | II Divisioona (Second Division) | East Group | Finnish FA (Suomen Palloliitto) | 4th | |
| 1987 | Tier 3 | II Divisioona (Second Division) | West Group | Finnish FA (Suomen Palloliitto) | 11th | Relegated |
| 1988 | Tier 4 | III Divisioona (Third Division) | Group 2 | Helsinki & Uusimaa (SPL Uusimaa) | 3rd | |
| 1989 | Tier 4 | III Divisioona (Third Division) | Group 2 | Helsinki & Uusimaa (SPL Uusimaa) | 2nd | |
| 1990 | Tier 4 | III Divisioona (Third Division) | Group 2 | Helsinki & Uusimaa (SPL Uusimaa) | 9th | Relegation Playoff – Relegated |
| 1991 | Tier 5 | IV Divisioona (Fourth Division) | Group 3 Helsinki & Uusimaa | Helsinki & Uusimaa (SPL Uusimaa) | 9th | |
| 1992 | Tier 5 | IV Divisioona (Fourth Division) | Group 3 Helsinki & Uusimaa | Helsinki & Uusimaa (SPL Uusimaa) | 3rd | |
| 1993 | Tier 5 | Nelonen (Fourth Division) | Group 3 Helsinki & Uusimaa | Helsinki & Uusimaa (SPL Uusimaa) | 1st | Promoted |
| 1994 | Tier 4 | Kolmonen (Third Division) | Section 1 | Finnish FA (Suomen Palloliitto) | 2nd | Playoffs – Promoted |
| 1995 | Tier 3 | Kakkonen (Second Division) | South Group | Finnish FA (Suomen Palloliitto) | 2nd | Promoted |
| 1996 | Tier 2 | Ykkönen (First Division) | South Group | Finnish FA (Suomen Palloliitto) | 5th | |
| 1997 | Tier 2 | Ykkönen (First Division) | South Group | Finnish FA (Suomen Palloliitto) | 5th | Promotion Group – 9th |
| 1998 | Tier 2 | Ykkönen (First Division) | South Group | Finnish FA (Suomen Palloliitto) | 6th | Relegation Group South – 6th |
| 1999 | Tier 2 | Ykkönen (First Division) | South Group | Finnish FA (Suomen Palloliitto) | 5th | Promotion Group – 5th |
| 2000 | Tier 2 | Ykkönen (First Division) | South Group | Finnish FA (Suomen Palloliitto) | 7th | Relegation Group South – 6th |
| 2001 | Tier 2 | Ykkönen (First Division) | South Group | Finnish FA (Suomen Palloliitto) | 4th | |
| 2002 | Tier 2 | Ykkönen (First Division) | South Group | Finnish FA (Suomen Palloliitto) | 3rd | Lower Group South – 3rd |
| 2003 | Tier 2 | Ykkönen (First Division) | | Finnish FA (Suomen Palloliitto) | 4th | |
| 2004 | Tier 2 | Ykkönen (First Division) | | Finnish FA (Suomen Palloliitto) | 3rd | |
| 2005 | Tier 2 | Ykkönen (First Division) | | Finnish FA (Suomen Palloliitto) | 1st | Promoted |
| 2006 | Tier 1 | Veikkausliiga (Premier League) | | Finnish FA (Suomen Palloliitto) | 4th | |
| 2007 | Tier 1 | Veikkausliiga (Premier League) | | Finnish FA (Suomen Palloliitto) | 4th | |
| 2008 | Tier 1 | Veikkausliiga (Premier League) | | Finnish FA (Suomen Palloliitto) | 2nd | |
| 2009 | Tier 1 | Veikkausliiga (Premier League) | | Finnish FA (Suomen Palloliitto) | 2nd | |
| 2010 | Tier 1 | Veikkausliiga (Premier League) | | Finnish FA (Suomen Palloliitto) | 4th | |
| 2011 | Tier 1 | Veikkausliiga (Premier League) | | Finnish FA (Suomen Palloliitto) | 4th | |
| 2012 | Tier 1 | Veikkausliiga (Premier League) | | Finnish FA (Suomen Palloliitto) | 7th | |
| 2013 | Tier 1 | Veikkausliiga (Premier League) | | Finnish FA (Suomen Palloliitto) | 2nd | |
| 2014 | Tier 1 | Veikkausliiga (Premier League) | | Finnish FA (Suomen Palloliitto) | 11th | Did not get a new Veikkausliiga license due to finances. Continued in Kakkonen (Tier 3). |
| 2015 | Tier 3 | Kakkonen (Second Division) | South Group | Finnish FA (Suomen Palloliitto) | 1st | Playoffs – Not promoted |
| 2016 | Tier 3 | Kakkonen (Second Division) | Group B | Finnish FA (Suomen Palloliitto) | 1st | Playoffs – Promoted |
| 2017 | Tier 2 | Ykkönen (First Division) | | Finnish FA (Suomen Palloliitto) | 2nd | Playoffs – Promoted |
| 2018 | Tier 1 | Veikkausliiga (Premier League) | | Finnish FA (Suomen Palloliitto) | 4th | |
| 2019 | Tier 1 | Veikkausliiga (Premier League) | | Finnish FA (Suomen Palloliitto) | 3rd | |
| 2020 | Tier 1 | Veikkausliiga (Premier League) | | Finnish FA (Suomen Palloliitto) | 4th | |
| 2021 | Tier 1 | Veikkausliiga (Premier League) | | Finnish FA (Suomen Palloliitto) | 9th | |
| 2022 | Tier 1 | Veikkausliiga (Premier League) | | Finnish FA (Suomen Palloliitto) | 3rd | |
| 2023 | Tier 1 | Veikkausliiga (Premier League) | | Finnish FA (Suomen Palloliitto) | 5th | Surrendered the league license due to bankruptcy. Assumed the reserve team's spot in new Kakkonen (Tier 4). |
| 2024 | Tier 4 | Kakkonen (Second Division) | Group B | Finnish FA (Suomen Palloliitto) | 8th | |

- 15 seasons in Veikkausliiga
- 21 seasons in Ykkönen
- 13 seasons in Kakkonen
- 9 seasons in Kolmonen
- 3 seasons in Nelonen

== Current squad ==
As of 4 September 2026.

Note: Flags indicate national team as defined under FIFA eligibility rules; some limited exceptions apply. Players may hold more than one non-FIFA nationality.

| No. | Pos. | Nation | Player |
|---|---|---|---|
| 1 | GK | FIN | Axel Helin |
| 2 | DF | FIN | Jouni Hämäläinen |
| 3 | DF | FIN | Elias Äijälä |
| 4 | DF | FIN | Amos Ramström |
| 5 | DF | FIN | Oliver Tukia |
| 6 | MF | FIN | Roope Pyyskänen |
| 7 | DF | FIN | Musa Hietakangas |
| 8 | MF | FIN | Hannes Woivalin |
| 9 | FW | FIN | Mustafa Safwan Mahmood |
| 10 | MF | FIN | Niilo Saarikivi |
| 11 | MF | FIN | Benjamin Heikkinen |
| 12 | GK | FIN | Ville Viljala |
| 13 | DF | FIN | Otto Huttunen |
| 14 | DF | NGR | Nyebuchi Chukwu |
| 15 | DF | FIN | Joonas Sundman |

| No. | Pos. | Nation | Player |
|---|---|---|---|
| 17 | MF | FIN | Benjamin Ahokas |
| 18 | MF | FIN | Veikko Karppinen |
| 19 | DF | FIN | Daniel Vadell |
| 20 | FW | FIN | Karim Al-Wehliye |
| 21 | FW | FIN | Veikka Koistinen |
| 22 | MF | FIN | Alex Jännes |
| 23 | FW | FIN | Kasperi Liikonen |
| 24 | FW | FIN | Pauli Katajamäki |
| 25 | DF | FIN | Aarni Ritala |
| 27 | MF | FIN | Justus Lehto |
| 28 | FW | NGR | Chinedu Umeh |
| 29 | DF | SUI | Alex Paraiso |
| 30 | GK | CAN | Spencer King |
| 46 | FW | GHA | Baba Haruna |

=== Out on loan ===
Note: Flags indicate national team as defined under FIFA eligibility rules; some limited exceptions apply. Players may hold more than one non-FIFA nationality.

| No. | Pos. | Nation | Player |

== Management ==
Updated 19 February 2021.

| Name | Role |
|---|---|
| (Finland) Mika Väyrynen | Head coach |
| (Finland) Sampo Koskinen | Coach |
| (Finland) Joel Perovuo | Coach |
| (Finland) Juha Saavalainen | Kit manager |
| (Finland) Harri Kokko | Fitness Coach |
| (Finland) Max Thibault | Physiotherapist and fitness coach |

== FC Honka Akatemia ==
FC Honka Akatemia is the reserve team of FC Honka. The team plays in Kakkonen in 2022 season.

== Managers ==
- (Finland) Jari Europaeus (1 Jan 2001 – 31 Dec 2003)
- (Finland) Abdou Talat (1 Jan 2004 – 31 Dec 2004)
- (Finland) Mika Lehkosuo (1 Jan 2005 – 7 Feb 2014)
- (Finland) Shefki Kuqi (15 Feb 2014 – 31 Dec 2014)
- (Finland) Juho Rantala (7 Feb 2015 – 1 Dec 2016)
- (Finland) Vesa Vasara (5 Dec 2016 – November 2023)
- (Finland) Mika Väyrynen (November 2023 – 2024)
- (Portugal) Diogo Pinto (2025 – present)

== See also ==
- FC Honka (women)
