= Finnish League Cup =

- Founded: 1994
- Region: Finland
- Current champions: FC Inter Turku (4th title)
- Most championships: HJK (6 titles)

The Finnish League Cup (in Finnish: Liigacup), is a knock-out football competition contested annually during the pre-season in winter by teams from Veikkausliiga. The competition is notably the only football competition in Europe which is mostly played indoors. It is also administrated by Veikkausliiga.

== History ==
The competition was founded in 1994. After 18 editions it was abolished in 2016. It was replaced with the Finnish Cup group stage starting from the 2017 season

The league cup was revived in 2022, as it returned in its original format. The competing teams are allowed to have up to three non-contract test players in their roster, with seven possible substitutions. The most successful club is HJK Helsinki with 6 titles.

== Finnish League Cup Finals ==
Year	Winner	Score	Runner-up	Venue
1994	HJK	2–0	FC Jazz	Helsinki
1995	FC Haka	4–2	HJK	Helsinki
1996	HJK	3–2	RoPS	Helsinki Olympic Stadium, Helsinki
1997	HJK	2–0	VPS	Helsinki
1998	HJK	1–1 (aet) (8–7 p)	FF Jaro	Helsinki
1999	VPS	3–0	Kotkan TP	Lahti
2000	VPS	2–1	FC Jokerit	Hanko
2001–2003	Not Played			
2004	AC Allianssi	2–2 (aet) (5–3 p)	FC Lahti	Pohjola Stadion, Vantaa
2005	AC Allianssi	3–1	FC Lahti	Finnair Stadium, Helsinki
2006	KuPS	2–1	FC KooTeePee	Finnair Stadium, Helsinki
2007	FC Lahti	0–0 (4–3 p)	FC Inter Turku	Finnair Stadium, Helsinki
2008	FC Inter Turku	1–0	TPS	Finnair Stadium, Helsinki
2009	Tampere United	2–0	HJK	ISS Stadion, Vantaa
2010	FC Honka	0–0 (4–3 p)	JJK	Finnair Stadium, Helsinki
2011	FC Honka	3–0	Tampere United	Tapiolan urheilupuisto, Espoo
2012	TPS	1–1 (4–2 p)	HJK	Sonera Stadium, Helsinki
2013	FC Lahti	2–1	JJK	Lahden kisapuisto, Lahti
2014	SJK	1–0	VPS	Jouppilanvuoren tekonurmi, Seinäjoki
2015	HJK	2–0	RoPS	Rovaniemen keskuskenttä, Rovaniemi
2016	FC Lahti	0–0 (aet) (4–3 p)	SJK	Wallsport Arena, Seinäjoki
2017–2021	Not Played			
2022	FC Honka	3–1	FC Inter Turku	Espoonlahti, Espoo
2023	HJK	2–1	AC Oulu	Bolt Arena, Helsinki
2024	Inter Turku	2–2 (4–2 p)	KuPS	Veritas Stadion, Turku
2025	Inter Turku	4–4 (8–7 p)	HJK Helsinki	Myyrmäki Football Stadium, Vantaa
2026	Inter Turku	2–1	AC Oulu	Veritas Stadion, Turku

== Performance by club ==
Club	Winners	Runners-up	Winning Years
HJK	6	4	1994, 1996, 1997, 1998, 2015, 2023
FC Inter Turku	4	2	2008, 2024, 2025, 2026
FC Lahti	3	2	2007, 2013, 2016
FC Honka	3	–	2010, 2011, 2022
VPS	2	2	1999, 2000
AC Allianssi	2	–	2004, 2005
Tampere United	1	1	2009
TPS	1	1	2012
SJK	1	1	2014
KuPS	1	1	2006
FC Haka	1	–	1995
JJK	–	2	–
RoPS	–	2	–
FC Jazz	–	1	–
FF Jaro	–	1	–
KTP	–	1	
AC Oulu	–	2	–
FC Jokerit	–	1	–
FC KooTeePee	–	1	–

Notes:

- Teams in Italic no longer exist.

== See also ==
- Finnish Cup
