= Tampere United =

Association football club in Finland

- Full name: Jalkapalloseura Tampere United ry
- Nickname: Sinipaidat (The Blueshirts)
- Short name: TamU
- Founded: 31 July 1998; 28 years ago
- Ground: Kauppi Football Stadium
- Capacity: 1,000
- Chairman: Markus Kyöstäjä
- Manager: Topi Priha
- League: Ykkösliiga
- 2026: Ykkönen, 1st of 12 (champions; promoted)
- Website: tampereunited.fi
Home colours	Away colours

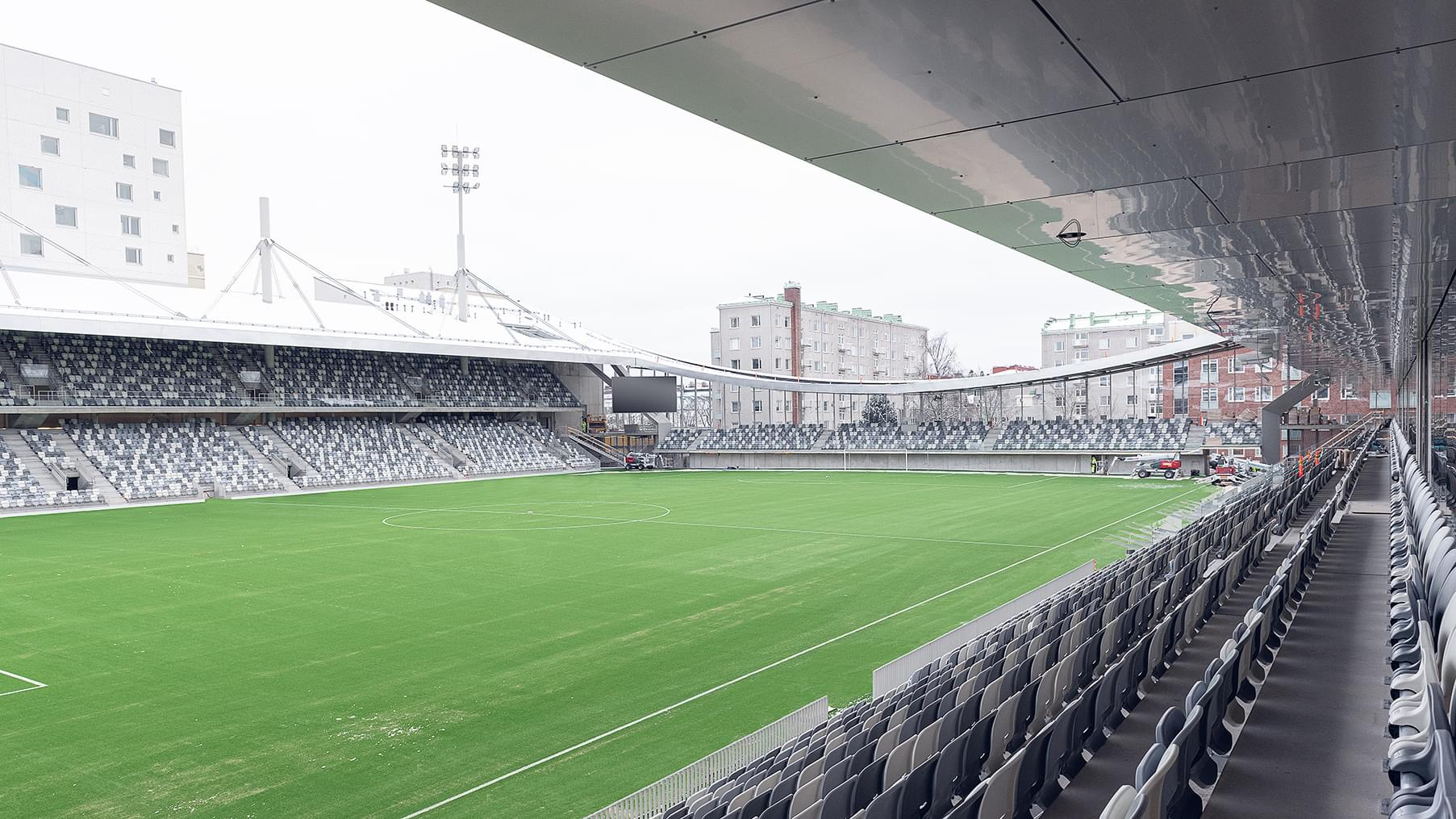
Tammelan Stadion, the former home ground of Tampere United.

Tampere United is a Finnish football club from the city of Tampere. In the 2027 season, the club will play in Ykkösliiga, the second highest level of football in Finland.

The club had a team in Veikkausliiga, the premier football league in Finland, until the end of the 2010 season. It was excluded from participating in Finnish football during the 2011 season amid suspicions of money laundering. The club was kept alive by its supporters, who entered a team called TamU-K in Kutonen, the lowest tier of football in Finland, in 2012. The club earned three promotions in four years, and all its teams were taken over by Tampere United in the lead up to the 2016 season. Tampere United is now a fan-owned club and controlled by the same supporters who ran TamU-K.

== History ==
The club was formed in July 1998. The initial plan was to merge two local football clubs Ilves and Tampereen Pallo-Veikot (TPV), but TPV decided to continue as its own team. Ilves continued to play in the lower divisions and Tampere United inherited its place in the second tier of Finnish football, Ykkönen.

In Tampere United's first season, the 1999 Ykkönen, the club won promotion to the Veikkausliiga, the top tier of Finnish football, 15 months after the formation of the club. During the 2000 season they reached sixth place in the league. On their third season in 2001 they won the Finnish championship.

In 2002, the club finished in fifth place, and in 2003, third place. After the 2003 season the club moved from Tammelan Stadion to Tampere Stadium due to stadium conditions and will to expand the club's activities. In 2006, Tampere United won their second Finnish Championship and one year later, in 2007, they were the champions yet again taking home their third title.

During the 2007 season, Tampere United also reached the third qualifying round of the UEFA Champions League. Tampere United defeated Bulgarian champions Levski Sofia 2–0 on aggregate in the second qualifying round. Tampere United failed to reach the Champions League group stage when Rosenborg BK defeated them 5–0 on aggregate. In the UEFA Cup first round, United lost to Girondins de Bordeaux 4–3 on aggregate.

=== Exclusion and collapse ===
Tampere United had started to face financial difficulties in the late 2000s and in 2009 it was reported, that the club was not able to pay wages due to its financial situation. Attendances had also started to dwindle during the late 2000s, which did not help the situation.

On 14 April 2011 the club was suspended indefinitely by the Football Association of Finland because they had received money from a dubious company based in Singapore, known for involvement in fixed games and money laundering. The club was excluded from the 2011 season of Veikkausliiga. Players under contract were released due to lack of funds.

The club did not officially participate in any competition between 2011 and 2015. In April 2013 the Turku Court of Appeal found the former CEO Deniz Bavautdin and the former chairman of the board Harri Pyhältö guilty of money laundering.

=== Revival by the supporters ===
Supporters of Tampere United had founded a supporters' trust in 2009 after the club had hit financial difficulties. The aim was to help fans gain a voice within the club, help the club's financial situation and to buy shares of the club.

In 2012 the supporters' trust founded a new team named after the supporters' trust, TamU-K. In 2012 the team played in Kutonen, the lowest tier of Finnish football, and gained promotion to Vitonen after their first season. The promotion securing playoff match had an attendance of 441. In 2013 the team was promoted to Nelonen and in 2014, the team made it to penalties in the promotion playoff but ultimately lost. After another season in Nelonen, TamU-K was promoted to Kolmonen.

In the lead up to the 2016 season, Tampere United took over all the teams that played under TamU-K. Thereby, Tampere United made a return to the Finnish football scene as a fan-owned club and played in Kolmonen in 2016. After the 2016 season the club gained promotion to Kakkonen. In 2017 Tampere United finished sixth in Kakkonen Group B and in 2018 it finished ninth in Group C, and remained in Kakkonen in the 2019 season.

Tampere United was relegated from Kakkonen after the 2019 season and played in Kolmonen, the fourth tier of Finnish football at the time, for two seasons. After the 2021 season of Kolmonen Tampere United managed to gain promotion to Kakkonen. The club played in Kakkonen for three seasons, until it managed to secure promotion to the Ykkönen, the third tier of Finnish football, after the 2024 season of Kakkonen. The club finished sixth in the 2025 season of Ykkönen and competes in the league in the 2026 season as well.

=== Move to Tammelan Stadion and financial difficulties ===
After the 2023 season of Kakkonen, Tampere United moved to the brand-new Tammelan Stadion from its old home of Pyynikin urheilukenttä. At first, the move seemed to work as attendances doubled after the move from the average attendance of 468 to 944 from the 2023 to 2024 season. However, the club played in the new stadium for only two seasons, the 2024 season of Kakkonen and 2025 season of Ykkönen, until it had to leave the stadium.

During the time in Tammelan Stadion, the club had started to face financial difficulties due to the high rent compared to Pyynikin urheilukenttä and the difficulty of generating money from match sales. Whereas in Pyynikin urheilukenttä, which is owned by the city, all match sales go directly to the club, in Tammelan Stadion the match sales go through the operator and the club that hosts the match only gets a small commission from these sales.

Due to the reasons listed before, Tampere United started the 2026 season of Ykkönen in the Kauppi Football Stadium, which got a new main stand in 2025 and has a capacity of 1,000.

== Honours ==
Veikkausliiga

- Champions: 2001, 2006, 2007

Ykkönen

- Champions: 2026

Finnish Cup

- Champions: 2007
- Runners-up: 2001, 2009

Finnish League Cup

- Champions: 2009
- Runners-up: 2011

Finnish Regions’ Cup

- Champions: 2021

== Tampere United in Europe ==
Season	Competition	Round	Opponent	Score (home-away)
2002–03	UEFA Champions League	Q1	(Armenia) Pyunik F.C.	0–4, 0–2
2003	UEFA Intertoto Cup	1	(Romania) Ceahlăul Piatra Neamț	1–0, 1–2
2003	UEFA Intertoto Cup	2	(Serbia and Montenegro) FK Sutjeska Nikšić	0–0, 1–0
2003	UEFA Intertoto Cup	3	(Croatia) HNK Cibalia	0–2, 1–0
2004	UEFA Intertoto Cup	1	(Luxembourg) CS Grevenmacher	0–0, 1–1
2004	UEFA Intertoto Cup	2	(Azerbaijan) Khazar Universiteti	3–0, 0–1
2004	UEFA Intertoto Cup	3	(Serbia) OFK Beograd	0–0, 0–1
2005	UEFA Intertoto Cup	1	(Faroe Islands) Skála ÍF	2–0, 1–0
2005	UEFA Intertoto Cup	2	(Belgium) R. Charleroi S.C.	1–0, 0–0
2005	UEFA Intertoto Cup	3	(Italy) SS Lazio	1–1, 0–3
2006	UEFA Intertoto Cup	1	(Wales) Carmarthen Town	5–0, 3–1
2006	UEFA Intertoto Cup	2	(Sweden) Kalmar FF	1–2, 2–3
2007–08	UEFA Champions League	Q1	(San Marino) SS Murata	2–0, 2–1
2007–08	UEFA Champions League	Q2	(Bulgaria) PFC Levski Sofia	1–0, 1–0
2007–08	UEFA Champions League	Q3	(Norway) Rosenborg BK	0–3, 0–2
2007–08	UEFA Cup	1	(France) Girondins de Bordeaux	2–3, 1–1
2008–09	UEFA Champions League	Q1	(Montenegro) FK Budućnost Podgorica	2–1, 1–1
2008–09	UEFA Champions League	Q2	(Slovakia) FC Artmedia Petržalka	1–3, 2–4

== Season to season ==
Season	Level	Division	Section	Administration	Position	Movements
1999	Tier 2	Ykkönen	North Group	Finnish FA (Suomen Palloliitto)	1st	Promotion Group – 1st
2000	Tier 1	Veikkausliiga		Finnish FA (Suomen Palloliitto)	6th	
2001	Tier 1	Veikkausliiga		Finnish FA (Suomen Palloliitto)	1st	Champions
2002	Tier 1	Veikkausliiga		Finnish FA (Suomen Palloliitto)	6th	Upper Group – 5th
2003	Tier 1	Veikkausliiga		Finnish FA (Suomen Palloliitto)	3rd	
2004	Tier 1	Veikkausliiga		Finnish FA (Suomen Palloliitto)	3rd	
2005	Tier 1	Veikkausliiga		Finnish FA (Suomen Palloliitto)	3rd	
2006	Tier 1	Veikkausliiga		Finnish FA (Suomen Palloliitto)	1st	Champions
2007	Tier 1	Veikkausliiga		Finnish FA (Suomen Palloliitto)	1st	Champions
2008	Tier 1	Veikkausliiga		Finnish FA (Suomen Palloliitto)	7th	
2009	Tier 1	Veikkausliiga		Finnish FA (Suomen Palloliitto)	7th	
2010	Tier 1	Veikkausliiga		Finnish FA (Suomen Palloliitto)	7th	
2011	N/A	Suspended				
2012	Tier 7	Kutonen	Group 4	Finnish FA Tampere District	2nd	Promoted
2013	Tier 6	Vitonen	Group 1	Finnish FA Tampere District	1st	Promoted
2014	Tier 5	Nelonen		Finnish FA Tampere District	2nd	
2015	Tier 5	Nelonen		Finnish FA Tampere District	1st	Promoted
2016	Tier 4	Kolmonen		Finnish FA Tampere District	1st	Promoted
2017	Tier 3	Kakkonen	Group B	Finnish FA (Suomen Palloliitto)	6th	
2018	Tier 3	Kakkonen	Group C	Finnish FA (Suomen Palloliitto)	9th	
2019	Tier 3	Kakkonen	Group B	Finnish FA (Suomen Palloliitto)	12th	Relegated
2020	Tier 4	Kolmonen		Finnish FA Tampere District	3rd	
2021	Tier 4	Kolmonen		Finnish FA Tampere District	1st	Promoted
2022	Tier 3	Kakkonen	Group B	Finnish FA (Suomen Palloliitto)	8th	
2023	Tier 3	Kakkonen	Group B	Finnish FA (Suomen Palloliitto)	5th	
2024	Tier 4	Kakkonen	Group B	Finnish FA (Suomen Palloliitto)	3rd	Promoted via play-offs
2025	Tier 3	Ykkönen		Finnish FA (Suomen Palloliitto)	6th	
2026	Tier 3	Ykkönen		Finnish FA (Suomen Palloliitto)	1st	Promoted

- 11 seasons in Veikkausliiga
- 2 seasons in Ykkönen
- 6 seasons in Kakkonen
- 3 season in Kolmonen
- 2 seasons in Nelonen
- 1 season in Vitonen
- 1 season in Kutonen

== Current squad ==
As of 1 September 2026

Note: Flags indicate national team as defined under FIFA eligibility rules; some limited exceptions apply. Players may hold more than one non-FIFA nationality.

No.	Pos.	Nation	Player
1	GK	FIN	Joonas Immonen
25	GK	FIN	Santeri Pakkanen
2	DF	FIN	Jani Alaperä
3	DF	FIN	Joona Hallivuori
4	DF	FIN	Ardian Kovaqi
5	DF	FIN	Joel Laitinen
13	DF	FIN	Tomas Sovelius
15	DF	FIN	Joonas Rantala
17	DF	FIN	Lauri Kesti
33	DF	FIN	Joona Malinen
6	MF	FIN	Noel Hasa
8	MF	FIN	Rasmus Lehtonen

No.	Pos.	Nation	Player
10	MF	FIN	Taha Özcelik
11	MF	FIN	Justus Rantanen
21	MF	FIN	Juho Enbuska
23	MF	FIN	Leo Kyllönen
30	MF	FIN	Juho Heikkinen
7	FW	EST	Janar Georg
9	FW	FIN	Jesse Huhtala
16	FW	FIN	Kristoffer Riihilahti
18	FW	FIN	Ossi Torniainen
19	FW	ENG	Lui Bradbury
22	FW	FIN	Rasmus Väisänen
29	FW	FIN	Kalle Huhta (on loan from Klubi 04)

=== Out on loan ===
Note: Flags indicate national team as defined under FIFA eligibility rules; some limited exceptions apply. Players may hold more than one non-FIFA nationality.

No. / Pos. / Nation / Player; 20 / DF / FIN / Aleksi Hämäläinen (at FC Vaajakoski until 31 December 2026)	No. / Pos. / Nation / Player; 31 / GK / FIN / Oskari Hirvonen (at Union Plaani until 31 December 2026)

== Managers ==
- (Finland) Harri Kampman (1999–2000)
- (Finland) Ari Hjelm (2001–2010)
- (Finland) Jarkko Wiss (2011)
- (Finland) Antti Pettinen (2011–2012)
- (Finland) Mika Suonsyrjä (2012–2015)
- (Finland) Mikko Mäkelä (2016–2018)
- (South Africa) Leroy Maluka (2018)
- (Finland) Mourad Seddiki (2019)
- (Finland) Jukka Listenmaa (2020–2024)
- (Finland) Tero Suonperä (2024)
- (England) Sebastian Bowles (2025)
- (Finland) Topi Priha (2026-)
