= 2016 Finnish League Cup =

2016 Liigacup
Tournament details
- Country: Finland
- Dates: 17 January – 19 March
- Teams: 12

Final positions
- Champions: Lahti
- Runners-up: SJK

Tournament statistics
- Matches played: 31
- Goals scored: 62 (2 per match)
- Top goal scorer: Roope Riski (4)

The 2016 Finnish League Cup was the 20th season of the Finnish League Cup, Finland's second-most prestigious cup football tournament. HJK were the defending champions, having won their fifth league cup the previous year.

The cup consisted of two stages. First there was a group stage that involved the 12 Veikkausliiga teams divided into two groups. The top teams from each group then played each other in the final.

== Group A ==
Pos	Team	Pld	W	D	L	GF	GA	GD	Pts	Qualification
1	SJK	5	4	1	0	6	2	+4	13	Final
2	PS Kemi	5	2	1	2	6	5	+1	7	
3	VPS	5	2	1	2	4	4	0	7	
4	RoPS	5	1	3	1	4	3	+1	6	
5	Ilves	5	1	1	3	3	6	−3	4	
6	KuPS	5	1	1	3	3	6	−3	4	

Updated to match(es) played on 27 February 2015. Source: veikkausliiga.com
Rules for classification: 1) points; 2) goal difference; 3) number of goals scored; 4) head-to-head points; 5) head-to-head goal difference; 6) goals scored in head-to-head

29 January 2016	KuPS	0–0	SJK	Kuopio
18:30 EET (UTC+2)		Report (in Finnish)	Kink (yellow card) 64'	Stadium: Kuopio-halli; Attendance: 1,015; Referee: Ville Nevalainen

30 January 2016	RoPS	0–0	VPS	Oulu
14:00 EET (UTC+2)	Okkonen (yellow card) 85'	Report (in Finnish)	Tiodorović (yellow card) 84'	Stadium: Heinäpään nurmi Attendance: 210; Referee: Dennis Antamo

30 January 2016	PS Kemi	3–1	Ilves	Kemi
16:00 EET (UTC+2)	Veteli 24'; Kvist 48' (pen.); Jovović (yellow card) 88' (goal) 90+1'	Report (in Finnish)	Lahtinen 7'; Aho (yellow card) 47'; Matrone (yellow card) 50'	Stadium: Junkohalli; Attendance: 450; Referee: Mattias Gestranius

4 February 2016	RoPS	2–0	KuPS	Oulu
18:00 EET (UTC+2)	Malcolm 10'; Jammeh (yellow card) 41'; Back (yellow card) 57'; Okkonen (yellow card) 72'; Heikkilä 90'	Report (in Finnish)	Poutiainen (yellow card) 47'; Coulibaly (yellow card) 90+2'	Stadium: Heinäpään nurmi Attendance: 204; Referee: Petri Viljanen

6 February 2016	Ilves	0–1	VPS	Tampere
14:30 EET (UTC+2)	Hilander (yellow card) 37'; Hynynen (yellow card) 77'; Matrone (yellow card) 87'	Report (in Finnish)	Hertsi 38' (pen.); Hill (yellow card) 89'	Stadium: Pirkkahalli Arena; Attendance: 500; Referee: Oskari Hämäläinen

7 February 2016	KuPS	0–2	PS Kemi	Kuopio
18:30 EET (UTC+2)	Räisänen (yellow card) 21'	Report (in Finnish)	Heimonen (yellow card) 10'; Berg 33' (yellow card) 65'; Eissele 62'; Kvist (yellow card) 68'	Stadium: Kuopio-halli; Attendance: 831; Referee: Kalle Mäkinen

10 February 2016	Ilves	0–0	RoPS	Tampere
18:00 EET (UTC+2)	Matrone (yellow card) 52'; Lahtinen (yellow card) 59'; Miettunen (yellow card) 70'; Petrescu (yellow card) 90+1'	Report (in Finnish)	Mäkitalo (yellow card) 52'; Okkonen (yellow card) 62'	Stadium: Pirkkahalli Arena; Attendance: 550; Referee: Mikko Mörö

10 February 2016	SJK	2–1	VPS	Seinäjoki
19:15 EET (UTC+2)	Hurme (yellow card) 14'; Ngueukam 56'; Riski 63'	Report (in Finnish)	Clennon 12'; Klepczarek (yellow card) 80'	Stadium: Wallsport Areena; Attendance: 482; Referee: Antti Munukka

13 February 2016	SJK	1–0	PS Kemi	Seinäjoki
14:15 EET (UTC+2)	Kink (yellow card) 42'; Vasara (yellow card) 70'; Riski 90+2'	Report (in Finnish)	Kaby (yellow card) 18'; Könönen (yellow card) 66'; S.Jovović (yellow card) 79' (yellow-red card) 84'	Stadium: Wallsport Areena; Attendance: 459; Referee: Vesa Hätilä

13 February 2016	VPS	0–2	KuPS	Vaasa
13:15 EET (UTC+2)		Report (in Finnish)	Poutiainen (yellow card) 24' (goal) 29'; Ääritalo 31'; Diallo (yellow card) 36'	Stadium: Botniahalli; Referee: Toni Pohjoismäki

16 February 2016	SJK	1–0	Ilves	Seinäjoki
17:00 EET (UTC+2)	Ngueukam 57'; J.Sarajärvi (yellow card) 76'	Report (in Finnish)	Ala-Myllymäki (yellow card) 17'; Hilska (yellow card) 30'	Stadium: Wallsport Areena; Referee: Marko Grönholm

16 February 2016	PS Kemi	1–1	RoPS	Kemi
18:00 EET (UTC+2)	Ions 4'; Turpeenniemi (yellow card) 45+3'	Report (in Finnish)	Muinonen 21'; Majava (yellow card) 49'	Stadium: Junkohalli; Referee: Antti Munukka

20 February 2016	Ilves	2–1	KuPS	Tampere
14:30 EET (UTC+2)	Lahtinen 65', 70' (yellow card) 90+2'; Siira (yellow card) 80'	Report (in Finnish)	Taipale (yellow card) 45+1'; Hakola 45+10'; Savolainen (yellow card) 55'; Ääritalo (yellow card) 90+1'	Stadium: Pirkkahalli Arena; Attendance: 550

20 February 2016	VPS	2–0	PS Kemi	Vaasa
16:00 EET (UTC+2)	Voutilainen 71'; Alanko 73'	Report (in Finnish)		Stadium: Botniahalli

27 February 2016	RoPS	1–2	SJK	Oulu
15:00 EET (UTC+2)	M.Saine (yellow card) 21'; J.Hämäläinen (red card) 26'; Okkonen 50' (yellow card) 76'; Pirinen (yellow card) 88'	Report (in Finnish)	Riski 27' (pen.), 32'	Stadium: Heinäpään nurmi Attendance: 253; Referee: Ville Nevalainen

== Group B ==
Pos	Team	Pld	W	D	L	GF	GA	GD	Pts	Qualification
1	Lahti	5	2	3	0	7	5	+2	9	Final
2	Inter Turku	5	2	2	1	6	5	+1	8	
3	HJK	5	1	4	0	8	7	+1	7	
4	PK-35 Vantaa	5	1	3	1	5	5	0	6	
5	IFK Mariehamn	5	1	1	3	5	5	0	4	
6	HIFK	5	1	1	3	5	9	−4	4	

Updated to match(es) played on 18 February 2016. Source: veikkausliiga.com
Rules for classification: 1) points; 2) goal difference; 3) number of goals scored; 4) head-to-head points; 5) head-to-head goal difference; 6) goals scored in head-to-head

22 January 2016	Inter Turku	0–0	PK-35 Vantaa	Turku
14:00 EET (UTC+2)	Kauppi (yellow card) 58'; Camara (yellow card) 82'	Report (in Finnish)	Ristola (yellow card) 70'	Stadium: Veritas Stadion; Attendance: 174; Referee: Mattias Gestranius

23 January 2016	Lahti	1–0	HIFK	Lahti
12:00 EET (UTC+2)	Kuningas 5'; Shala (yellow card) 84'	Report (in Finnish)		Stadium: Mukkulan palloiluhalli Attendance: 0 Referee: Dennis Antamo

29 January 2016	Lahti	2–1	Inter Turku	Lahti
15:00 EET (UTC+2)	Hauhia 15'; Tuominen 60'	Report (in Finnish)	Gnabouyou 43' (pen.); Kauppi (yellow card) 73'	Stadium: Mukkulan palloiluhalli Attendance: 226; Referee: Antti Munukka

29 January 2016	HIFK	0–3	PK-35 Vantaa	Helsinki
19:00 EET (UTC+2)	Hänninen (yellow card) 82'	Report (in Finnish)	Míguez Adán (yellow card) 8'; Kuqi 36' (pen.) (yellow card) 44'; Kaufmann 60', 69'	Stadium: Talin jalkapallohalli Attendance: 604; Referee: Jari Järvinen

31 January 2016	HJK	1–0	IFK Mariehamn	Helsinki
12:15 EET (UTC+2)	Rexhepi (yellow card) 44' (yellow-red card) 60'; Taiwo 70' (pen.)	Report (in Finnish)	Petrović (yellow card) 36'; Clement (yellow card) 69'; Span (yellow card) 90+4'	Stadium: Talin jalkapallohalli Attendance: 424; Referee: Marko Grönholm

1 February 2016	PK-35 Vantaa	1–1	Lahti	Vantaa
14:15 EET (UTC+2)	Caloi (yellow card) 73'; Heinonen 81'	Report (in Finnish)	Shala 61'	Stadium: Myyrmäki-halli; Attendance: 272; Referee: Petteri Kari

3 February 2016	HIFK	1–0	IFK Mariehamn	Helsinki
15:30 EET (UTC+2)	Rantanen 90+2'	Report (in Finnish)	Petrović (yellow card) 46'; Lyyski (yellow card) 55'; Diego Assis (yellow card) 61'	Stadium: Talin jalkapallohalli Attendance: 213; Referee: Petri Viljanen

5 February 2016	HJK	1–1	Lahti	Helsinki
17:00 EET (UTC+2)	Tanaka 86'	Report	Multanen 31'; Hauhia (yellow card) 72'	Stadium: Talin jalkapallohalli Attendance: 612; Referee: Miikka Lähdesmäki

8 February 2016	IFK Mariehamn	0–1	Inter Turku	Åland
19:00 EET (UTC+2)		Report	Gnabouyou 4'	Stadium: Eckeröhallen; Referee: Mattias Gestranius

9 February 2016	HJK	3–3	HIFK	Helsinki
17:00 EET (UTC+2)	Taiwo 21'; Malolo (yellow card) 37'; Järvenpää 82'; Morelos 90'	Report	Hänninen 3'; Aho (yellow card) 6'; Salmikivi 16'; Peltonen (yellow card) 32'; Korhonen 65'; Sihvola (yellow card) 90+3'	Stadium: Talin jalkapallohalli Attendance: 827; Referee: Ville Nevalainen

12 February 2016	Lahti	2–2	Mariehamn	Lahti
15:00 EET (UTC+2)	Tuominen 13'; Bonilha (yellow card) 25'; Hostikka 64'; Shala (yellow card) 87'	Report	Kangaskolkka (yellow card) 32' (goal) 90'; Dafaa (yellow card) 37'; Span (yellow card) 45'; Ekhalie 68'	Stadium: Lahti Stadium; Attendance: 78; Referee: Petri Viljanen

13 February 2016	PK-35 Vantaa	1–1	HJK	Vantaa
15:00 EET (UTC+2)	Kuqi 23'; Rasimus (yellow card) 35'; Mateo (yellow card) 49'; Couñago (yellow card) 49'; C.Portela (yellow card) 75'	Report	Tanaka 42'; I.Tatomirović (yellow card) 66'	Stadium: Myyrmäki-halli; Attendance: 743; Referee: Tommi Grönman

15 February 2016	Inter Turku	2–1	HIFK	Turku
15:00 EET (UTC+2)	Källman 11'; Aho 13'; Lehtonen (yellow card) 67'	Report	Soudant (yellow card) 45+2'; Fortunato 46'	Stadium: Veritas Stadion; Referee: Jari Järvinen

18 February 2016	Inter Turku	2–2	HJK	Turku
15:00 EET (UTC+2)	Nyman (yellow card) 16'; Duah 42'; Gnabouyou 53'	Report	Taiwo (yellow card) 36'; Morelos 56', 63' (pen.) (yellow card) 87'	Stadium: Javenture-Areena; Attendance: 198; Referee: Petri Viljanen

20 February 2016	IFK Mariehamn	3 – 0	PK-35 Vantaa	Åland
18:00 EET (UTC+2)	Kangaskolkka 4'; Mäkinen 15'; Dafaa (yellow card) 17'; Petrović (yellow card) 68'; Ibrahim 73'	Report	Raimi (yellow card) 26'	Stadium: Eckeröhallen; Attendance: 285

== Final ==
19 March 2016 Final	SJK	0– 0 (a.e.t.) (3–4 p)	Lahti	Seinajoki
16:00 EET (UTC+2)	E.Kane (yellow card) 24'; T.Penninkangas (yellow card) 85'	Report		Stadium: Wallsport Areena; Attendance: 487; Referee: D.Antamo
	Penalties
	Eremenko (penalty scored); Rahimi (penalty missed); Riski (penalty scored); Laaksonen (penalty scored); Tahvanainen (penalty missed)		Rafael (penalty scored); J.Tuominen (penalty scored); Multanen (penalty missed); Kärkkäinen (penalty scored); Sesay (penalty scored)

== Scorers ==
As of match played 27 February 2016

4 goals:

- (Finland) Roope Riski - SJK

3 goals:

- (Colombia) Alfredo Morelos - HJK
- (Finland) Mika Lahtinen - Ilves
- (France) Guy Gnabouyou - Inter Turku

2 goals:

- (Nigeria) Taye Taiwo - HJK
- (Japan) Atomu Tanaka - HJK
- (Finland) Jasse Tuominen - Lahti
- (Finland) Aleksei Kangaskolkka - IFK Mariehamn
- (Brazil) Lucas Kaufmann - PK-35 Vantaa
- (Finland) Njazi Kuqi - PK-35 Vantaa
- (Cameroon) Ariel Ngueukam - SJK

1 goals:

- (Brazil) Domenico Fortunato - HIFK
- (Finland) Matias Hänninen - HIFK
- (Finland) Joni Korhonen - HIFK
- (Finland) Daniel Rantanen - HIFK
- (Finland) Ville Salmikivi - HIFK
- (Finland) Lassi Järvenpää - HJK
- (Finland) Solomon Duah - Inter Turku
- (Finland) Benjamin Källman - Inter Turku
- (Finland) Joni Aho - Inter Turku
- (England) Billy Ions - PS Kemi
- (Finland) Juho-Teppo Berg - PS Kemi
- (Finland) Saku Kvist - PS Kemi
- (Finland) Joona Veteli - PS Kemi
- (Montenegro) Saša Jovović - PS Kemi
- (United States) Christian Eissele - PS Kemi
- (Finland) Mika Ääritalo - KuPS
- (Finland) Juha Hakola - KuPS
- (Finland) Patrick Poutiainen - KuPS
- (Finland) Mikko Kuningas - Lahti
- (Finland) Mikko Hauhia - Lahti
- (Finland) Kalle Multanen - Lahti
- (Finland) Santeri Hostikka - Lahti
- (Finland) Drilon Shala - Lahti
- (Finland) Thomas Mäkinen - IFK Mariehamn
- (Kenya) Amos Ekhalie - IFK Mariehamn
- (Sweden) Josef Ibrahim - IFK Mariehamn
- (Spain) Caloi - PK-35 Vantaa
- (Guam) Shane Malcolm - RoPS
- (Finland) Aapo Heikkilä - RoPS
- (Finland) Eetu Muinonen - RoPS
- (Finland) Antti Okkonen - RoPS
- (Finland) Loorents Hertsi - VPS
- (Finland) Jerry Voutilainen - VPS
- (Finland) Samu Alanko - VPS
- (Jamaica) Andre Clennon - VPS
