= 2016 HJK season =

HJK
2016 season
- Chairman: Olli-Pekka Lyytikäinen
- Manager: Mika Lehkosuo
- Stadium: Sonera Stadium
- Veikkausliiga: Runners-up
- Finnish Cup: Runners-up
- League Cup: Group Stage
- UEFA Europa League: Third qualifying round
- Top goalscorer: League: Alfredo Morelos (16); All: Alfredo Morelos (30)
- Highest home attendance: League: 10,500 (26 May 2016 vs HIFK, Veikkausliiga)
- Lowest home attendance: League: 2,562 (7 August 2016 vs FC Lahti, Veikkausliiga)
- Average home league attendance: 5,101
| Home colours | Away colours |

The 2016 season was Helsingin Jalkapalloklubi's 108th competitive season. HJK is the most successful football club in Finland in terms of titles, with 27 Finnish Championships, 12 Finnish Cup titles, 5 Finnish League Cup titles, one appearance in the UEFA Champions League group stages and one appearance in the UEFA Europa League group stages.

After finishing 3rd in the 2015 Veikkausliiga season, HJK entered the 2016–17 UEFA Europa League first qualifying round. For the 2nd consecutive season, HJK U-19 competed in the UEFA Youth League.

== Season Review ==
- 31 January: HJK kicked off their 20th League Cup campaign with a 1 - 0 win over IFK Mariehamn. HJK eventually finished third in Group B, however, remained unbeaten throughout the campaign.
- 12 February: Jarno Parikka announced his retirement from football due to a knee injury.
- 19 March: HJK started their 62nd Finnish Cup edition with a 3 - 1 victory over FC Honka/Akatemia and advanced to the sixth round.
- 2 April: HJK started their 27th Veikkausliiga season with a 2 - 0 home win against IFK Mariehamn. Atomu Tanaka headed in the first goal of the 2016 Veikkausliiga season from a cross delivered by Taye Taiwo.
- 31 May: Taye Taiwo was named the Veikkausliiga Player of the Month for May 2016. Mika Lehkosuo was likewise named the Manager of the Month.
- 30 June: HJK started their 2016–17 UEFA Europa League campaign with a 0 - 2 away win against Lithuanian side FK Atlantas. A week later HJK went through to the next qualifying round after beating Atlantas 3 - 1 on aggregate.
- 4 August: HJK's 2016–17 UEFA Europa League campaign came to an end after a 0 - 2 home defeat to IFK Göteborg. Göteborg advanced to the play-off round 3 - 2 on aggregate.
- 24 September: HJK were beaten on penalties in the 2016 Finnish Cup Final by SJK, who were crowned Finnish Cup Champions for the first time in club history. Alfredo Morelos was the top scorer of the competition with 7 goals in 4 matches.
- 12 October: Alfredo Morelos was named the Veikkausliiga Player of the Month for September 2016.
- 23 October: HJK finished runners-up in the 2016 Veikkausliiga season with 58 points from 33 matches. Alfredo Morelos was the top scorer for HJK with 16 league goals and a total of 30 goals in all competitions.

== Squad ==
As of 23 October 2016

| No. | Name | Nationality | Position | Date of birth (age) | Previous club |
Goalkeepers
| 21 | Thomas Dähne | (Germany) | GK | 4 January 1994 (aged 22) | (Germany) RB Leipzig |
| 25 | Jiri Koski | (Finland) | GK | 20 April 1995 (aged 21) | (Finland) Klubi-04 |
| 29 | Markus Uusitalo | (Finland) | GK | 15 May 1997 (aged 19) | (Finland) VPS |
Defenders
| 3 | Taye Taiwo | (Nigeria) | DF | 16 April 1985 (aged 31) | (Turkey) Bursaspor |
| 5 | Lum Rexhepi | (Kosovo) | DF | 3 August 1992 (aged 24) | (Norway) Lillestrøm |
| 8 | Rafinha | (Brazil) | DF | 29 June 1982 (aged 34) | (Belgium) Gent |
| 14 | Ivan Tatomirović | (Serbia) | DF | 11 January 1989 (aged 27) | (Bosnia and Herzegovina) FK Sarajevo |
| 15 | Ville Jalasto | (Finland) | DF | 19 April 1986 (aged 30) | (Norway) Stabæk |
| 16 | Aapo Halme | (Finland) | DF | 22 May 1998 (aged 18) | (Finland) Klubi-04 |
| 18 | Roni Peiponen | (Finland) | DF | 9 April 1997 (aged 19) | Loan from (Norway) Molde |
| 27 | Sebastian Sorsa | (Finland) | DF | 25 January 1984 (aged 32) | (Scotland) Hamilton Academical |
Midfielders
| 6 | Obed Malolo | (Finland) | MF | 18 April 1997 (aged 19) | (Finland) Klubi-04 |
| 10 | Atomu Tanaka | (Japan) | MF | 4 October 1987 (aged 29) | (Japan) Albirex Niigata |
| 13 | Toni Kolehmainen | (Finland) | MF | 20 July 1988 (aged 28) | (Norway) Hønefoss |
| 19 | Lucas Lingman | (Finland) | MF | 25 January 1998 (aged 18) | (Finland) Klubi-04 |
| 20 | Vincent Onovo | (Nigeria) | MF | 10 December 1995 (aged 20) | (Finland) Inter Turku |
| 22 | Anthony Annan | (Ghana) | MF | 21 July 1986 (aged 30) | (Norway) Stabæk |
| 37 | Saku Ylätupa | (Finland) | MF | 4 August 1999 (aged 17) | (Finland) Klubi-04 |
| 38 | Sebastian Dahlström | (Finland) | MF | 5 November 1996 (aged 19) | (Finland) Klubi-04 |
Forwards
| 7 | Nikolai Alho | (Finland) | FW | 12 March 1993 (aged 23) | (Finland) Klubi-04 |
| 9 | Mikael Forssell | (Finland) | FW | 15 March 1981 (aged 35) | (Germany) VfL Bochum |
| 11 | Alfredo Morelos | (Colombia) | FW | 21 June 1996 (aged 20) | Loan from (Colombia) Independiente Medellín |
| 17 | Ousman Jallow | (The Gambia) | FW | 21 October 1988 (aged 28) | (Kazakhstan) Irtysh Pavlodar |
| 31 | Akseli Pelvas | (Finland) | FW | 8 February 1989 (aged 27) | (Sweden) Falkenbergs FF |
| 34 | Lassi Lappalainen | (Finland) | FW | 24 August 1998 (aged 18) | (Finland) Klubi-04 |
| 77 | Evans Mensah | (Ghana) | FW | 9 February 1998 (aged 18) | Loan from (Ghana) Inter Allies |
| 90 | Nnamdi Oduamadi | (Nigeria) | FW | 17 October 1990 (aged 26) | Loan from (Italy) A.C. Milan |

=== On loan ===
Note: Flags indicate national team as defined under FIFA eligibility rules; some limited exceptions apply. Players may hold more than one non-FIFA nationality.

| No. / Pos. / Nation / Player; 31 / DF / FIN / Leo Väisänen (on loan at PK-35 Vantaa until end of season) | No. / Pos. / Nation / Player; 35 / DF / FIN / Lassi Järvenpää (on loan at RoPS until end of season) |

== Transfers ==
=== Winter ===
In: Note: Flags indicate national team as defined under FIFA eligibility rules; some limited exceptions apply. Players may hold more than one non-FIFA nationality.

| No. | Pos. | Nation | Player |
|---|---|---|---|
| 4 | MF | SLE | Medo (from (England) Bolton Wanderers) |
| 5 | DF | KOS | Lum Rexhepi (from (Norway) Lillestrøm) |
| 9 | FW | FIN | Mikael Forssell (from (Germany) VfL Bochum) |
| 11 | FW | COL | Alfredo Morelos (loan from (Colombia) Independiente Medellín) |
| 14 | DF | SRB | Ivan Tatomirović (from (Bosnia and Herzegovina) FK Sarajevo) |
| 15 | DF | FIN | Ville Jalasto (from (Norway) Stabæk) |
| 16 | FW | FIN | Jarno Parikka (from (Finland) VPS) |
| 20 | MF | NGR | Vincent Onovo (from (Finland) Inter Turku) |
| 22 | MF | GHA | Anthony Annan (from (Norway) Stabæk) |
| 29 | GK | FIN | Markus Uusitalo (from (Finland) VPS) |
| 43 | FW | GHA | Richard Gadze (loan from (India) Delhi Dynamos) |
| 90 | FW | NGR | Nnamdi Oduamadi (loan from (Italy) A.C. Milan) |

Out: Note: Flags indicate national team as defined under FIFA eligibility rules; some limited exceptions apply. Players may hold more than one non-FIFA nationality.

| No. | Pos. | Nation | Player |
|---|---|---|---|
| 1 | GK | SWE | Daniel Örlund (to (Sweden) IF Brommapojkarna) |
| 3 | DF | GHA | Gideon Baah (to (United States) New York Red Bulls) |
| 4 | DF | FIN | Juhani Ojala (loan return to (Russia) Terek Grozny) |
| 5 | DF | FIN | Tapio Heikkilä (to (Finland) SJK) |
| 6 | DF | FIN | Markus Heikkinen (to (Finland) AC Oulu) |
| 8 | FW | GAM | Demba Savage (to (Sweden) BK Häcken) |
| 8 | MF | FIN | Matti Klinga (to (Finland) SJK) |
| 11 | DF | FIN | Veli Lampi (to (Finland) VPS) |
| 15 | DF | FIN | Roni Peiponen (to (Norway) Molde) |
| 16 | FW | FIN | Jarno Parikka (Retired) |
| 18 | FW | GAM | Ousman Jallow (to (Kazakhstan) Irtysh Pavlodar) |
| 20 | FW | FIN | Joel Pohjanpalo (to (Germany) Bayer Leverkusen) |
| 22 | FW | GBS | Formose Mendy (to (Turkey) Adana Demirspor) |
| 28 | MF | FIN | Rasmus Schüller (to (Sweden) BK Häcken) |
| 35 | GK | FIN | Saku-Pekka Sahlgren (to (Norway) Sandnes Ulf) |
| 80 | FW | FIN | Erfan Zeneli (to (Kazakhstan) Shakhter Karagandy) |
| 91 | MF | FRA | Guy Moussi |
| 95 | FW | BRA | Ademir (loan return to (Brazil) Ituano) |
| 99 | FW | SEN | Macoumba Kandji |

=== Summer ===
In: Note: Flags indicate national team as defined under FIFA eligibility rules; some limited exceptions apply. Players may hold more than one non-FIFA nationality.

| No. | Pos. | Nation | Player |
|---|---|---|---|
| 8 | DF | BRA | Rafinha (from (Belgium) Gent) |
| 17 | FW | GAM | Ousman Jallow (from (Kazakhstan) Irtysh Pavlodar) |
| 18 | DF | FIN | Roni Peiponen (loan from (Norway) Molde) |
| 31 | FW | FIN | Akseli Pelvas (from (Sweden) Falkenbergs FF) |
| 77 | FW | GHA | Evans Mensah (loan from (Ghana) Inter Allies) |

Out: Note: Flags indicate national team as defined under FIFA eligibility rules; some limited exceptions apply. Players may hold more than one non-FIFA nationality.

| No. | Pos. | Nation | Player |
|---|---|---|---|
| 4 | MF | SLE | Medo (to Kuwait SC) |
| 31 | DF | FIN | Leo Väisänen (loan to (Finland) PK-35 Vantaa) |
| 35 | DF | FIN | Lassi Järvenpää (loan to (Finland) RoPS) |
| 43 | FW | GHA | Richard Gadze (loan return to (India) Delhi Dynamos) |

== Friendlies ==
| 22 January 2016 | (Finland) HJK | 1 – 0 | (Estonia) Infonet | Helsinki |
| 17:15 EET (UTC+2) | L. Lappalainen 59' | Report | | Stadium: Talin jalkapallohalli |

| 25 February 2016 | (Finland) HJK | 0 – 0 | (Estonia) Nõmme Kalju | Helsinki |
| 14:15 EET (UTC+2) | | Report | | Stadium: Talin jalkapallohalli |

| 9 March 2016 | (Spain) Linense | 1 – 2 | (Finland) HJK | Marbella, Spain |
| 18:00 EET (UTC+2) | Juampe 3' (pen.) | Report | Tanaka 87'; Tatomirović 90' |

| 12 March 2016 | (Finland) HJK | 2 – 0 | (Finland) SJK | Marbella, Spain |
| 16:00 EET (UTC+2) | Taiwo 31'; Tanaka 71' | Report |

| 25 March 2016 | (Sweden) Malmö FF | 4 – 0 | (Finland) HJK | Malmö, Sweden |
| 16:00 EET (UTC+2) | | Report | | Stadium: Swedbank Stadion |

== Competitions ==
=== Veikkausliiga ===
The 2016 Veikkausliiga season began 2 April 2016 and ended on 23 October 2016.

==== League table ====
| Pos | Team | Pld | W | D | L | GF | GA | GD | Pts | Qualification or relegation |
|---|---|---|---|---|---|---|---|---|---|---|
| 1 | IFK Mariehamn (C) | 33 | 17 | 10 | 6 | 40 | 25 | +15 | 61 | Qualification for the Champions League second qualifying round |
| 2 | HJK | 33 | 16 | 10 | 7 | 52 | 36 | +16 | 58 | Qualification for the Europa League first qualifying round (Note: SJK qualified for the Europa League first qualifying round by winning the 2016 Finnish Cup.) |
| 3 | SJK | 33 | 17 | 6 | 10 | 49 | 36 | +13 | 57 | Qualification for the Europa League first qualifying round |
| 4 | VPS | 33 | 15 | 8 | 10 | 36 | 27 | +9 | 53 | Qualification for the Europa League first qualifying round |
| 5 | Ilves | 33 | 15 | 7 | 11 | 36 | 35 | +1 | 52 | |

Source: Veikkausliiga (in Finnish), Soccerway
Rules for classification: 1) Points; 2) Goal difference; 3) Goals scored; 4) Head-to-head points; 5) Head-to-head goal difference; 6) Head-to-head away goals scored; 7) Play-off
(Note: Play-off is only played if need to decide champion, teams for relegation or UEFA competition and will be played on a neutral ground).
(C) Champions

==== Results summary ====
| Overall | | | | | | | | Home | | | | | | Away | | | | | |
| Pld | W | D | L | GF | GA | GD | Pts | W | D | L | GF | GA | GD | W | D | L | GF | GA | GD |
|---|---|---|---|---|---|---|---|---|---|---|---|---|---|---|---|---|---|---|---|
| 33 | 16 | 10 | 7 | 52 | 36 | +16 | 58 | 11 | 4 | 2 | 35 | 19 | +16 | 5 | 6 | 5 | 17 | 17 | 0 |

Last updated: 24 October 2016.
Source: See Results

==== Results by matchday ====
| Round | 1 | 2 | 3 | 4 | 5 | 6 | 7 | 8 | 9 | 10 | 11 | 12 | 13 | 14 | 15 | 16 | 17 | 18 | 19 | 20 | 21 | 22 | 23 | 24 | 25 | 26 | 27 | 28 | 29 | 30 | 31 | 32 | 33 |
|---|---|---|---|---|---|---|---|---|---|---|---|---|---|---|---|---|---|---|---|---|---|---|---|---|---|---|---|---|---|---|---|---|---|
| Ground | H | H | A | H | A | A | H | A | H | A | H | A | A | H | A | H | A | H | A | H | A | H | A | H | H | A | H | A | H | A | H | A | H |
| Result | W | W | D | W | D | L | W | W | W | W | W | D | L | D | W | W | L | W | D | D | D | L | D | W | W | W | L | L | W | L | D | W | D |
| Position | 1 | 1 | 1 | 1 | 1 | 2 | 1 | 1 | 1 | 1 | 1 | 1 | 1 | 1 | 1 | 1 | 2 | 2 | 2 | 1 | 1 | 2 | 2 | 2 | 1 | 1 | 1 | 1 | 1 | 2 | 2 | 2 | 2 |

Updated to match(es) played on 24 October 2016. Source: See Results
A = Away; H = Home; W = Win; D = Draw; L = Loss

==== Results ====
| 2 April 2016 1 | HJK | 2 – 0 | IFK Mariehamn | Helsinki |
| 14:00 EEST (UTC+3) | Rexhepi (yellow card) 55'; Tanaka 68', 84'; Tatomirović (yellow card) 70' | Report | Ekhalie (yellow card) 19'; Lyyski (yellow card) 56' | Stadium: Sonera Stadium; Attendance: 5,251; Referee: Ville Nevalainen |

| 8 April 2016 2 | HJK | 3 – 1 | VPS | Helsinki |
| 18:30 EEST (UTC+3) | Morelos 20' (yellow card) 71'; Medo 49'; Onovo (yellow card) 54'; Tanaka 61' | Report | Kobozev (yellow card) 30'; N. Boxall (yellow card) 33'; L. Hertsi 68' | Stadium: Sonera Stadium; Attendance: 4,799; Referee: Jari Järvinen |

| 14 April 2016 3 | RoPS | 2 – 2 | HJK | Rovaniemi |
| 18:30 EEST (UTC+3) | Jammeh (yellow card) 20'; Kokko 27' (yellow card) 78'; John 37' (yellow card) 69'; Pirinen (yellow card) 78' | Report | Morelos 10', 41'; Medo (yellow card) 16'; Sorsa (yellow card) 31' | Stadium: Rovaniemen keskuskenttä Attendance: 2,475; Referee: Dennis Antamo |

| 18 April 2016 4 | HJK | 2 – 1 | SJK | Helsinki |
| 18:30 EEST (UTC+3) | Rexhepi (yellow card) 66'; Morelos 69'; Tanaka 74' (yellow card) 87'; Lingman (yellow card) 90+3' | Report | T. Penninkangas (yellow card) 10'; Ngueukam 25' (yellow card) 58' | Stadium: Sonera Stadium; Attendance: 5,237; Referee: Mattias Gestranius |

| 24 April 2016 5 | IFK Mariehamn | 0 – 0 | HJK | Mariehamn |
| 16:30 EEST (UTC+3) | Dafaa (yellow card) 41'; Span (yellow card) 72' | Report | Alho (yellow card) 31'; Rexhepi (yellow card) 89'; A. Halme (yellow card) 90+4' | Stadium: Wiklöf Holding Arena; Attendance: 1,118; Referee: Jari Järvinen |

| 29 April 2016 6 | PS Kemi | 1 – 0 | HJK | Oulu |
| 18:30 EEST (UTC+3) | Gilligan 1'; S.Kvist (yellow card) 90+5' | Report | Malolo (yellow card) 55'; Alho (yellow card) 68'; A. Halme (yellow card) 85' | Stadium: Raatti Stadium; Attendance: 2,017; Referee: Marko Grönholm |

| 4 May 2016 7 | HJK | 5 – 1 | Ilves | Helsinki |
| 18:30 EEST (UTC+3) | Medo (yellow card) 37'; Forssell 51', 59' (pen.); Oduamadi 63'; S. Dahlström 67'; Jalasto 72'; Rexhepi (red card) 83' | Report | Lahtinen (yellow card) 18'; T. Siira 29' | Stadium: Sonera Stadium; Attendance: 6,081; Referee: Dennis Antamo |

| 7 May 2016 8 | PK-35 Vantaa | 1 – 2 | HJK | Vantaa |
| 16:00 EEST (UTC+3) | Heimonen (yellow card) 50'; Ristola 67' | Report | Oduamadi 58'; Taiwo 77'; Tanaka (yellow card) 83'; Dähne (yellow card) 90+2' | Stadium: Myyrmäen jalkapallostadion Attendance: 2,832; Referee: Mattias Gestranius |

| 16 May 2016 9 | HJK | 3 – 1 | Inter Turku | Helsinki |
| 18:30 EEST (UTC+3) | Alho 18'; Tanaka (yellow card) 61'; Taiwo 73', 80' | Report | Duah 12' (yellow card) 65'; Gnabouyou (yellow card) 62'; E. Belica (yellow card) 78'; Nyman (yellow card) 80' | Stadium: Sonera Stadium; Attendance: 4,951; Referee: Jani Laaksonen |

| 20 May 2016 10 | Lahti | 1 – 2 | HJK | Lahti |
| 18:30 EEST (UTC+3) | B. Tatar (yellow card) 28'; Maanoja (yellow card) 58'; Hauhia 61' | Report | Oduamadi 10' (yellow card) 44'; Taiwo 59' (pen.); Medo (yellow card) 65'; Sorsa (yellow card) 78'; Alho (yellow card) 90+3' | Stadium: Lahden kisapuisto Attendance: 3,646; Referee: Mattias Gestranius |

| 26 May 2016 11 | HJK | 2 – 1 | HIFK | Helsinki |
| 18:30 EEST (UTC+3) | Morelos 2'; Oduamadi 11' (yellow card) 64'; Tanaka (yellow card) 52'; Gadze (yellow card) 90' | Report | Terävä 5'; Sinisalo (yellow card) 13'; Taulo (yellow card) 26'; Gela (yellow card) 52'; Anyamele (yellow card) 81' | Stadium: Sonera Stadium; Attendance: 10,500; Referee: Dennis Antamo |

| 29 May 2016 12 | KuPS | 0 – 0 | HJK | Kuopio |
| 18:30 EEST (UTC+3) | Egwuekwe (yellow card) 57' | Report | Medo (yellow card) 70'; Rexhepi (yellow card) 77' | Stadium: Savon Sanomat Areena; Attendance: 4,457; Referee: Marko Grönholm |

| 9 June 2016 13 | VPS | 3 – 0 | HJK | Vaasa |
| 18:30 EEST (UTC+3) | Morrissey 20'; Lahti 27'; Clennon 85' | Report | Alho (yellow card) 13'; Tatomirović (yellow card) 26'; S. Dahlström (yellow card) 82' | Stadium: Kaarlen kenttä Attendance: 1,292; Referee: Marko Grönholm |

| 12 June 2016 14 | HJK | 1 – 1 | RoPS | Helsinki |
| 13:30 EEST (UTC+3) | Oduamadi (yellow card) 24'; Gadze (yellow card) 41'; Taiwo 50' (pen.); Rexhepi (yellow card) 90+5' | Report | Jammeh (yellow card) 18'; Mravec (yellow card) 48'; J.F. Nganbe Nganbe (yellow card) 71'; John 75' | Stadium: Sonera Stadium; Attendance: 3,102; Referee: Petri Viljanen |

| 18 June 2016 15 | SJK | 2 – 3 | HJK | Seinäjoki |
| 13:30 EEST (UTC+3) | T. Penninkangas 21'; Hradecky 32'; Hetemaj (yellow card) 69'; Hurme (yellow card) 87' | Report | Morelos 2'; Taiwo (yellow card) 47' (goal) 55'; Tanaka 65'; Alho (yellow card) 77' | Stadium: OmaSP Stadion; Attendance: 5,817; Referee: Ville Nevalainen |

| 10 July 2016 16 | HJK | 2 – 0 | PS Kemi | Helsinki |
| 17:00 EEST (UTC+3) | Medo (yellow card) 20'; Oduamadi 55'; Alho 86' (yellow card) 90+1' | Report | S. Kvist (yellow card) 51' | Stadium: Sonera Stadium; Attendance: 3,657; Referee: Mikko Mörö |

| 17 July 2016 17 | Ilves | 1 – 0 | HJK | Tampere |
| 18:30 EEST (UTC+3) | Tendeng 41' (pen.) (yellow card) 68'; Matrone (yellow card) 71'; Hilander (yellow card) 81'; Lahtinen (yellow card) 89' | Report | A. Halme (yellow card) 17'; Rexhepi (yellow card) 40' (yellow-red card) 90+4'; Medo (yellow card) 75'; Annan (yellow card) 90' | Stadium: Tammelan Stadion; Attendance: 5,050; Referee: Petri Viljanen |

| 24 July 2016 18 | HJK | 4 – 2 | PK-35 Vantaa | Helsinki |
| 18:30 EEST (UTC+3) | Morelos 1'; Alho 2'; S. Dahlström 13'; Oduamadi 17' | Report | A. Ahmed (yellow card) 37'; M. Ömer 53'; Kuqi 73' | Stadium: Sonera Stadium; Attendance: 3,185; Referee: Dennis Antamo |

| 31 July 2016 19 | Inter Turku | 0 – 0 | HJK | Turku |
| 18:30 EEST (UTC+3) | | Report | Alho (yellow card) 21'; Medo (yellow card) 89' | Stadium: Veritas Stadion; Attendance: 2,855; Referee: Kalle Mäkinen |

| 7 August 2016 20 | HJK | 2 – 2 | Lahti | Helsinki |
| 18:30 EEST (UTC+3) | Annan (yellow card) 64'; Forssell 76'; Rafinha (yellow card) 90+4'; Morelos 90+6' | Report | Rexhepi 31' (o.g.); Rafael (yellow card) 45'; Sesay (yellow card) 47'; J. Tuominen 59' | Stadium: Sonera Stadium; Attendance: 2,562; Referee: Dennis Antamo |

| 10 August 2016 21 | HIFK | 0 – 0 | HJK | Helsinki |
| 18:30 EEST (UTC+3) | Sinisalo (yellow card) 63'; Mäkelä (yellow card) 66' | Report | Morelos (yellow card) 51'; Sorsa (yellow card) 58'; Annan (yellow card) 60' (yellow-red card) 60'; Peiponen (yellow card) 85' | Stadium: Sonera Stadium; Attendance: 10,500; Referee: Ville Nevalainen |

| 15 August 2016 22 | HJK | 2 – 3 | KuPS | Helsinki |
| 18:30 EEST (UTC+3) | Morelos 36', 84'; Rexhepi (yellow card) 45'; Peiponen (yellow card) 89' | Report | Rannankari (yellow card) 16'; S. Jovović (yellow card) 27'; Salami (yellow card) 44' (goal) 90+2'; Hakola 67'; Jaiteh 90+4' | Stadium: Sonera Stadium; Attendance: 3,052; Referee: Jari Järvinen |

| 21 August 2016 23 | VPS | 0 – 0 | HJK | Vaasa |
| 18:30 EEST (UTC+3) | N.Boxall (yellow card) 80'; L.Hertsi (yellow card) 90+3' | Report | Rafinha (yellow card) 84' | Stadium: Elisa Stadion; Attendance: 4,321; Referee: Ville Nevalainen |

| 24 August 2016 24 | HJK | 2 – 0 | PK-35 Vantaa | Helsinki |
| 18:30 EEST (UTC+3) | A. Halme (red card) 27'; Jallow 30', 57' (pen.); Peiponen (yellow card) 66'; Kolehmainen (yellow card) 82' | Report | K. Raimi (yellow card) 56'; A. Ismail (yellow card) 64'; A. Ahmed (yellow card) 86'; Ristola (yellow card) 90+3' | Stadium: Sonera Stadium; Attendance: 3,362; Referee: Atte Jussila |

| 28 August 2016 25 | HJK | 1 – 0 | KuPS | Helsinki |
| 18:30 EEST (UTC+3) | Morelos 45' (yellow card) 84'; S. Dahlström (yellow card) 59'; Annan (yellow card) 76' | Report | Diallo (yellow card) 29'; J. Lautamaja (yellow card) 52' | Stadium: Sonera Stadium; Attendance: 3,025; Referee: Mikko Mörö |

| 9 September 2016 26 | PS Kemi | 0 – 2 | HJK | Kemi |
| 17:30 EEST (UTC+3) | Törnros (yellow card) 78'; Turpeenniemi (yellow card) 81' | Report | Morelos 8'; A. Räihä 31' (o.g.); Jalasto (yellow card) 67'; Pelvas (yellow card) 69'; Annan (yellow card) 78'; Rafinha (yellow card) 78' | Stadium: Sauvosaaren Urheilupuisto; Attendance: 2,023; Referee: Atte Jussila |

| 12 September 2016 27 | HJK | 1 – 4 | Lahti | Helsinki |
| 18:30 EEST (UTC+3) | Malolo (yellow card) 42'; Morelos 48'; Rafinha (yellow card) 76' (yellow-red card) 88'; Peiponen (yellow card) 84'; Alho (yellow card) 89' (red card) 90+4' | Report | Multanen 36'; J. Tuominen 43' (pen.); Kärkkäinen (yellow card) 45+1' (goal) 67'; Paananen 62' | Stadium: Sonera Stadium; Attendance: 4,326; Referee: Jari Järvinen |

| 16 September 2016 28 | Inter Turku | 3 – 2 | HJK | Turku |
| 18:30 EEST (UTC+3) | Nwanganga 17'; Kuqi 39', 66'; Lehtovaara (yellow card) 90+1' | Report | A. Halme (yellow card) 20'; Pelvas 53', 73' (pen.); Annan (yellow card) 71' | Stadium: Veritas Stadion; Attendance: 2,279; Referee: Kalle Mäkinen |

| 21 September 2016 29 | HJK | 2 – 1 | RoPS | Helsinki |
| 18:30 EEST (UTC+3) | Morelos 45+1'; Pelvas 84' (pen.) | Report | Pirinen (yellow card) 24'; Muinonen 34'; Saksela (yellow card) 37'; Lahdenmäki (yellow card) 51'; Jammeh (yellow card) 84' | Stadium: Sonera Stadium; Attendance: 5,142; Referee: Marko Grönholm |

| 30 September 2016 30 | HIFK | 2 – 1 | HJK | Helsinki |
| 18:30 EEST (UTC+3) | Mäkelä (yellow card) 31' (goal) 33'; Vesala (yellow card) 55'; Sihvola 73' | Report | Annan (yellow card) 72'; Morelos 83'; Onovo (yellow card) 90+3' | Stadium: Sonera Stadium; Attendance: 10,171; Referee: Antti Munukka |

| 14 October 2016 31 | HJK | 1 – 1 | IFK Mariehamn | Helsinki |
| 18:30 EEST (UTC+3) | Morelos 27' (yellow card) 89'; Alho (yellow card) 65' | Report | Sparrdal Mantilla (yellow card) 48'; Lyyski (yellow card) 77'; Kangaskolkka 78' | Stadium: Sonera Stadium; Attendance: 9,726; Referee: Mattias Gestranius |

| 17 October 2016 32 | Ilves | 1 – 3 | HJK | Tampere |
| 18:30 EEST (UTC+3) | Ala-Myllymäki 31'; P. Milosavljević (yellow card) 49'; Matrone (yellow card) 89' | Report | Kolehmainen (yellow card) 7'; Annan (yellow card) 18'; Rafinha 51'; Rexhepi (yellow card) 55'; Oduamadi 83'; S. Dahlström 88' | Stadium: Tammelan Stadion; Attendance: 5,050; Referee: Dennis Antamo |

| 23 October 2016 33 | HJK | 0 – 0 | SJK | Helsinki |
| 15:00 EEST (UTC+3) | Jalasto (yellow card) 56' | Report | Hetemaj (yellow card) 54'; Ojala (yellow card) 58'; Hurme (yellow card) 89' | Stadium: Sonera Stadium; Attendance: 8,752; Referee: Ville Nevalainen |

=== Finnish Cup ===
| 19 March 2016 Fifth Round | FC Honka/Akatemia | 1 – 3 | HJK | Espoo |
| 14:00 EET (UTC+2) | J. Perovuo (yellow card) 59'; E. Pehlivan 89' | Report | S. Dahlström (yellow card) 15'; Jalasto 35', 85'; Forssell 51' | Stadium: Tapiolan Urheilupuisto; Attendance: 240; Referee: Joonas Kovapohja |

| 21 April 2016 Sixth Round | AC Kajaani | 1 – 5 (a.e.t.) | HJK | Kajaani |
| 18:30 EEST (UTC+3) | R. Kahelin (yellow card) 65'; J. Lahnalakso (yellow card) 69'; M. Ibiyomi 79' (yellow card) 109'; C. Suta (yellow card) 113' | Report | Tatomirović (yellow card) 19'; Morelos 71', 116'; L. Väisänen 94'; Ylätupa 111'; Forssell 114' (pen.) | Stadium: Kajaanin liikuntapuisto Attendance: 1,172; Referee: Mikko Lehtola |

| 15 June 2016 Quarterfinals | KuPS | 1 – 4 | HJK | Kuopio |
| EEST (UTC+3) | J. Lautamaja (yellow card) 9'; Pennanen (yellow card) 38'; Salami (yellow card) 21' (goal) 78'; Diallo (yellow card) 85' | Report | Rexhepi (yellow card) 37'; Kolehmainen 39'; Morelos 53', 73', 85' (pen.); A. Halme (yellow card) 54' | Stadium: Väinölänniemen stadion Attendance: 3,673; Referee: Mattias Gestranius |

| 23 June 2016 Semifinals | FC Lahti | 0 – 3 | HJK | Lahti |
| 18:30 EEST (UTC+3) | Länsitalo (yellow card) 58' | Report | Morelos 33'; Malolo 62' (yellow card) 77'; Tanaka 79' (yellow card) 89' | Stadium: Lahti Stadium; Attendance: 1,238; Referee: Ville Nevalainen |

==== Final ====
| 24 September 2016 | SJK | 1 – 1 (a.e.t.) (7 – 6 p) | HJK | Tampere |
| 15:30 (EEST) | Vales (yellow card) 36'; Hetemaj (yellow card) 62'; Aimar (yellow card) 72'; Riski 74' | Report | Morelos 49' | Stadium: Ratina Stadium; Attendance: 2,000; Referee: Jari Järvinen |
| | Penalties |
| | Lehtinen (penalty scored); Vales (penalty scored); Hurme (penalty scored); Aimar (penalty missed); Laaksonen (penalty scored); Tuco (penalty scored); Penninkangas (penalty scored); Hetemaj (penalty scored) | | (penalty scored) Forssell; (penalty scored) Pelvas; (penalty scored) Morelos; (penalty scored) Rafinha; (penalty missed) Tatomirović; (penalty scored) S. Dahlström; (penalty scored) Annan; (penalty missed) Jalasto |

=== League Cup ===
| Pos | Team | Pld | W | D | L | GF | GA | GD | Pts | Qualification |
|---|---|---|---|---|---|---|---|---|---|---|
| 1 | Lahti | 5 | 2 | 3 | 0 | 7 | 5 | +2 | 9 | Final |
| 2 | Inter Turku | 5 | 2 | 2 | 1 | 6 | 5 | +1 | 8 | |
| 3 | HJK | 5 | 1 | 4 | 0 | 8 | 7 | +1 | 7 | |
| 4 | PK-35 Vantaa | 5 | 1 | 3 | 1 | 5 | 5 | 0 | 6 | |
| 5 | IFK Mariehamn | 5 | 1 | 1 | 3 | 5 | 5 | 0 | 4 | |
| 6 | HIFK | 5 | 1 | 1 | 3 | 5 | 9 | −4 | 4 | |

Updated to match(es) played on 18 February 2016. Source: veikkausliiga.com
Rules for classification: 1) points; 2) goal difference; 3) number of goals scored; 4) head-to-head points; 5) head-to-head goal difference; 6) goals scored in head-to-head

| 31 January 2016 1 | HJK | 1 – 0 | IFK Mariehamn | Helsinki |
| 12:15 EET (UTC+2) | Rexhepi (yellow card) 44' (yellow-red card) 60'; Taiwo 70' (pen.) | Report | Petrović (yellow card) 36'; Dafaa (yellow card) 69'; Span (yellow card) 90+4' | Stadium: Talin jalkapallohalli Attendance: 424; Referee: Marko Grönholm |

| 5 February 2016 2 | HJK | 1 – 1 | Lahti | Helsinki |
| 17:00 EET (UTC+2) | Tanaka 86' | Report | Multanen 31'; Hauhia (yellow card) 72' | Stadium: Talin jalkapallohalli Attendance: 612; Referee: Miikka Lähdesmäki |

| 9 February 2016 3 | HJK | 3 – 3 | HIFK | Helsinki |
| 17:00 EET (UTC+2) | Taiwo 21'; Malolo (yellow card) 37'; L. Järvenpää 82'; Morelos 90' | Report | M. Hänninen 3'; Aho (yellow card) 6'; Salmikivi 16'; Peltonen (yellow card) 32'; Korhonen 65'; Sihvola (yellow card) 90+3' | Stadium: Talin jalkapallohalli Attendance: 827; Referee: Ville Nevalainen |

| 13 February 2016 4 | PK-35 Vantaa | 1 – 1 | HJK | Vantaa |
| 13:00 EET (UTC+2) | Kuqi 23'; Rasimus (yellow card) 35'; Mateo (yellow card) 49'; Couñago (yellow card) 49'; C.Portela (yellow card) 75' | Report | Tanaka 42'; Tatomirović (yellow card) 66' | Stadium: Myyrmäki-halli; Attendance: 743 |

| 18 February 2016 5 | Inter Turku | 2 – 2 | HJK | Turku |
| 15:00 EET (UTC+2) | Nyman (yellow card) 16'; Duah 42'; Gnabouyou 53' | Report | Taiwo (yellow card) 36'; Morelos 56', 63' (pen.) (yellow card) 87' | Stadium: Javenture-Areena; Attendance: 198; Referee: Petri Viljanen |

=== UEFA Europa League ===
==== Qualifying rounds ====
| 30 June 2016 First qualifying round 1st leg | FK Atlantas (Lithuania) | 0 – 2 | (Finland) HJK | Klaipėda, Lithuania |
| 19:00 EEST (UTC+3) | O. Verbickas (yellow card) 40'; A. Sylla (yellow card) 90+1' | Report | Rexhepi (yellow card) 17'; Morelos 53', 85'; Tanaka (yellow card) 61' | Stadium: Central Stadium of Klaipėda; Attendance: 2,500; Referee: Alexandros Aretopoulos (Greece) |

| 7 July 2016 First qualifying round 2nd leg | HJK (Finland) | 1 – 1 (3 – 1 agg.) | (Lithuania) FK Atlantas | Helsinki, Finland |
| 19:00 EEST (UTC+3) | Taiwo 30' (pen.); Oduamadi (yellow card) 82' | Report | M. Adamonis (yellow card) 29'; Gašpuitis (yellow card) 33'; A. Sylla (yellow card) 70'; Papšys (76.) | Stadium: Sonera Stadium; Attendance: 3,501; Referee: Bryn Markham-Jones (Wales) |

| 14 July 2016 Second qualifying round 1st leg | Beroe (Bulgaria) | 1 – 1 | (Finland) HJK | Stara Zagora, Bulgaria |
| 20:30 EEST (UTC+3) | Ivanov (yellow card) 7'; Penev 49' | Report | Morelos 38' (yellow card) 90+5'; Rexhepi (yellow card) 90+5' | Stadium: Beroe Stadium; Attendance: 4,424; Referee: Petr Ardeleanu (Czech Republic) |

| 21 July 2016 Second qualifying round 2nd leg | HJK (Finland) | 1 – 0 (2 – 1 agg.) | (Bulgaria) Beroe | Helsinki, Finland |
| 19:00 EEST (UTC+3) | Tanaka 25' (yellow card) 55'; Tatomirović (yellow card) 37'; Medo (yellow card) 71' | Report | Ivanov (yellow card) 44'; Vasilev (yellow card) 53'; Pochanski (yellow card) 59'; Bozhilov (yellow card) 69'; Tom (yellow card) 78' | Stadium: Sonera Stadium; Attendance: 3,872; Referee: Padraig Sutton (Ireland) |

| 28 July 2016 Third qualifying round 1st leg | IFK Göteborg (Sweden) | 1 – 2 | (Finland) HJK | Gothenburg, Sweden |
| 20:00 EEST (UTC+3) | Salomonsson (yellow card) 31' (goal) 73'; Eriksson (yellow card) 32'; Hysén (yellow card) 59'; Engvall (yellow card) 90+6'; Rieks (yellow card) 90+6' | Report | Tanaka 47'; Tatomirović (yellow card) 68'; Gadze (yellow card) 69'; Morelos 75'; Annan (yellow card) 81'; Rexhepi (yellow card) 90+6' | Stadium: Gamla Ullevi; Attendance: 9,046; Referee: Kevin Clancy (Scotland) |

| 4 August 2016 Third qualifying round 2nd leg | HJK (Finland) | 0 – 2 (2 – 3 agg.) | (Sweden) IFK Göteborg | Helsinki, Finland |
| 19:00 EEST (UTC+3) | Sorsa (yellow card) 65'; Jalasto (yellow card) 69'; A. Halme (yellow card) 90' | Report | Smedberg-Dalence (yellow card) 33'; Boman 35'; Rogne (yellow card) 53'; Eriksson (yellow card) 77'; Ankersen 82'; Bjärsmyr (yellow card) 88' | Stadium: Sonera Stadium; Attendance: 10,107; Referee: Anatolii Zhabchenko (Ukraine) |

== Squad statistics ==
As of Match played 23 October 2016

=== Appearances and goals ===
| No. | Pos | Nat | Player | Total | | Veikkausliiga | | Finnish Cup | | League Cup | | Europa League | |
| No. | Pos | Nat | Player | Apps | Goals | Apps | Goals | Apps | Goals | Apps | Goals | Apps | Goals |
|---|---|---|---|---|---|---|---|---|---|---|---|---|---|
| 3 | DF | (Nigeria) NGR | Taye Taiwo | 34 | 9 | 21 | 6 | 4 | 0 | 5 | 2 | 4 | 1 |
| 5 | DF | (Kosovo) KOS | Lum Rexhepi | 33 | 0 | 21+1 | 0 | 2 | 0 | 4 | 0 | 5 | 0 |
| 6 | MF | (Finland) FIN | Obed Malolo | 27 | 1 | 13+2 | 0 | 3+1 | 1 | 3+1 | 0 | 2+2 | 0 |
| 7 | FW | (Finland) FIN | Nikolai Alho | 37 | 3 | 21+3 | 3 | 3 | 0 | 1+3 | 0 | 6 | 0 |
| 8 | DF | (Brazil) BRA | Rafinha | 14 | 1 | 12+1 | 1 | 1 | 0 | 0 | 0 | 0 | 0 |
| 9 | FW | (Finland) FIN | Mikael Forssell | 24 | 5 | 4+15 | 3 | 2+2 | 2 | 0 | 0 | 0+1 | 0 |
| 10 | MF | (Japan) JPN | Atomu Tanaka | 29 | 10 | 16+1 | 5 | 3 | 1 | 5 | 2 | 4 | 2 |
| 11 | FW | (Colombia) COL | Alfredo Morelos | 43 | 30 | 27+3 | 16 | 3+1 | 7 | 2+1 | 3 | 6 | 4 |
| 13 | MF | (Finland) FIN | Toni Kolehmainen | 21 | 1 | 13+2 | 0 | 2 | 1 | 0 | 0 | 1+3 | 0 |
| 14 | DF | (Serbia) SRB | Ivan Tatomirović | 37 | 0 | 22+1 | 0 | 2+2 | 0 | 2+2 | 0 | 6 | 0 |
| 15 | DF | (Finland) FIN | Ville Jalasto | 36 | 3 | 24 | 1 | 5 | 2 | 1 | 0 | 6 | 0 |
| 16 | DF | (Finland) FIN | Aapo Halme | 19 | 0 | 10+4 | 0 | 2 | 0 | 1+1 | 0 | 1 | 0 |
| 17 | FW | (The Gambia) GAM | Ousman Jallow | 3 | 2 | 3 | 2 | 0 | 0 | 0 | 0 | 0 | 0 |
| 18 | DF | (Finland) FIN | Roni Peiponen | 12 | 0 | 6+5 | 0 | 1 | 0 | 0 | 0 | 0 | 0 |
| 19 | MF | (Finland) FIN | Lucas Lingman | 12 | 0 | 0+6 | 0 | 2 | 0 | 4 | 0 | 0 | 0 |
| 20 | MF | (Nigeria) NGR | Vincent Onovo | 12 | 0 | 7+2 | 0 | 0 | 0 | 2+1 | 0 | 0 | 0 |
| 21 | GK | (Germany) GER | Thomas Dähne | 38 | 0 | 28 | 0 | 2 | 0 | 2 | 0 | 6 | 0 |
| 22 | MF | (Ghana) GHA | Anthony Annan | 20 | 0 | 13+2 | 0 | 1 | 0 | 0 | 0 | 3+1 | 0 |
| 25 | GK | (Finland) FIN | Jiri Koski | 1 | 0 | 0+1 | 0 | 0 | 0 | 0 | 0 | 0 | 0 |
| 27 | DF | (Finland) FIN | Sebastian Sorsa | 32 | 0 | 17+3 | 0 | 1+1 | 0 | 3+1 | 0 | 3+3 | 0 |
| 29 | GK | (Finland) FIN | Markus Uusitalo | 12 | 0 | 5+1 | 0 | 3 | 0 | 3 | 0 | 0 | 0 |
| 31 | FW | (Finland) FIN | Akseli Pelvas | 9 | 3 | 8 | 3 | 1 | 0 | 0 | 0 | 0 | 0 |
| 34 | FW | (Finland) FIN | Lassi Lappalainen | 19 | 0 | 5+9 | 0 | 1 | 0 | 4 | 0 | 0 | 0 |
| 37 | MF | (Finland) FIN | Saku Ylätupa | 5 | 1 | 0 | 0 | 0+2 | 1 | 3 | 0 | 0 | 0 |
| 38 | MF | (Finland) FIN | Sebastian Dahlström | 33 | 3 | 16+5 | 3 | 2+3 | 0 | 3+2 | 0 | 1+1 | 0 |
| 77 | FW | (Ghana) GHA | Evans Mensah | 3 | 0 | 0+3 | 0 | 0 | 0 | 0 | 0 | 0 | 0 |
| 90 | FW | (Nigeria) NGR | Nnamdi Oduamadi | 34 | 7 | 26+2 | 7 | 2 | 0 | 0 | 0 | 3+1 | 0 |
Players from Klubi-04 who appeared:
| 32 | DF | (Finland) FIN | Joachim Böckerman | 1 | 0 | 0 | 0 | 0 | 0 | 0+1 | 0 | 0 | 0 |
| 36 | FW | (Finland) FIN | Ilmari Ylönen | 5 | 0 | 0 | 0 | 0 | 0 | 2+3 | 0 | 0 | 0 |
| 36 | MF | (Finland) FIN | Karim Zine | 1 | 0 | 0 | 0 | 0+1 | 0 | 0 | 0 | 0 | 0 |
Players who left HJK during the season:
| 4 | MF | (Sierra Leone) SLE | Medo | 30 | 1 | 19+2 | 1 | 3 | 0 | 0 | 0 | 6 | 0 |
| 8 | MF | (Finland) FIN | Matti Klinga | 2 | 0 | 0 | 0 | 0 | 0 | 1+1 | 0 | 0 | 0 |
| 43 | FW | (Ghana) GHA | Richard Gadze | 20 | 0 | 4+10 | 0 | 2 | 0 | 0 | 0 | 3+1 | 0 |
Players away from the club on loan:
| 31 | DF | (Finland) FIN | Leo Väisänen | 6 | 1 | 2+1 | 0 | 2 | 1 | 1 | 0 | 0 | 0 |
| 35 | DF | (Finland) FIN | Lassi Järvenpää | 7 | 1 | 0 | 0 | 1+1 | 0 | 3+2 | 1 | 0 | 0 |

=== Goal scorers ===
| Place | Position | Nation | Number | Name | Veikkausliiga | Finnish Cup | League Cup | Europa League | Total |
|---|---|---|---|---|---|---|---|---|---|
| 1 | FW | (Colombia) | 11 | Alfredo Morelos | 16 | 7 | 3 | 4 | 30 |
| 2 | MF | (Japan) | 10 | Atomu Tanaka | 5 | 1 | 2 | 2 | 10 |
| 3 | DF | (Nigeria) | 3 | Taye Taiwo | 6 | 0 | 2 | 1 | 9 |
| 4 | FW | (Nigeria) | 90 | Nnamdi Oduamadi | 7 | 0 | 0 | 0 | 7 |
| 5 | FW | (Finland) | 9 | Mikael Forssell | 3 | 2 | 0 | 0 | 5 |
| 6 | FW | (Finland) | 7 | Nikolai Alho | 3 | 0 | 0 | 0 | 3 |
| 6 | DF | (Finland) | 15 | Ville Jalasto | 1 | 2 | 0 | 0 | 3 |
| 6 | FW | (Finland) | 31 | Akseli Pelvas | 3 | 0 | 0 | 0 | 3 |
| 6 | MF | (Finland) | 38 | Sebastian Dahlström | 3 | 0 | 0 | 0 | 3 |
| 10 | FW | (The Gambia) | 17 | Ousman Jallow | 2 | 0 | 0 | 0 | 2 |
| 11 | MF | (Sierra Leone) | 4 | Medo | 1 | 0 | 0 | 0 | 1 |
| 11 | MF | (Finland) | 6 | Obed Malolo | 0 | 1 | 0 | 0 | 1 |
| 11 | DF | (Brazil) | 8 | Rafinha | 1 | 0 | 0 | 0 | 1 |
| 11 | MF | (Finland) | 13 | Toni Kolehmainen | 0 | 1 | 0 | 0 | 1 |
| 11 | DF | (Finland) | 31 | Leo Väisänen | 0 | 1 | 0 | 0 | 1 |
| 11 | DF | (Finland) | 35 | Lassi Järvenpää | 0 | 0 | 1 | 0 | 1 |
| 11 | MF | (Finland) | 37 | Saku Ylätupa | 0 | 1 | 0 | 0 | 1 |
| # | Own goals | | | | 1 | 0 | 0 | 0 | 1 |
| TOTALS | | | | | 52 | 16 | 8 | 7 | 83 |

=== Disciplinary record ===
| Number | Nation | Position | Name | Veikkausliiga | | Finnish Cup | | League Cup | | Europa League | | Total | |
| Number | Nation | Position | Name | Yellow card | Red card | Yellow card | Red card | Yellow card | Red card | Yellow card | Red card | Yellow card | Red card |
| 3 | (Nigeria) | DF | Taye Taiwo | 1 | 0 | 0 | 0 | 1 | 0 | 0 | 0 | 2 | 0 |
| 4 | (Sierra Leone) | MF | Medo | 7 | 0 | 0 | 0 | 0 | 0 | 1 | 0 | 8 | 0 |
| 5 | (Kosovo) | DF | Lum Rexhepi | 9 | 2 | 1 | 0 | 2 | 1 | 3 | 0 | 15 | 3 |
| 6 | (Finland) | MF | Obed Malolo | 2 | 0 | 1 | 0 | 1 | 0 | 0 | 0 | 4 | 0 |
| 7 | (Finland) | FW | Nikolai Alho | 9 | 1 | 0 | 0 | 0 | 0 | 0 | 0 | 9 | 1 |
| 8 | (Brazil) | DF | Rafinha | 5 | 1 | 0 | 0 | 0 | 0 | 0 | 0 | 5 | 1 |
| 10 | (Japan) | MF | Atomu Tanaka | 4 | 0 | 1 | 0 | 0 | 0 | 2 | 0 | 7 | 0 |
| 11 | (Colombia) | FW | Alfredo Morelos | 4 | 0 | 0 | 0 | 1 | 0 | 1 | 0 | 6 | 0 |
| 13 | (Finland) | MF | Toni Kolehmainen | 2 | 0 | 0 | 0 | 0 | 0 | 0 | 0 | 2 | 0 |
| 14 | (Serbia) | DF | Ivan Tatomirović | 2 | 0 | 1 | 0 | 1 | 0 | 2 | 0 | 6 | 0 |
| 15 | (Finland) | DF | Ville Jalasto | 2 | 0 | 0 | 0 | 0 | 0 | 1 | 0 | 3 | 0 |
| 16 | (Finland) | DF | Aapo Halme | 4 | 1 | 1 | 0 | 0 | 0 | 1 | 0 | 6 | 1 |
| 18 | (Finland) | DF | Roni Peiponen | 4 | 0 | 0 | 0 | 0 | 0 | 0 | 0 | 4 | 0 |
| 19 | (Finland) | MF | Lucas Lingman | 1 | 0 | 0 | 0 | 0 | 0 | 0 | 0 | 1 | 0 |
| 20 | (Nigeria) | MF | Vincent Onovo | 2 | 0 | 0 | 0 | 0 | 0 | 0 | 0 | 2 | 0 |
| 21 | (Germany) | GK | Thomas Dähne | 1 | 0 | 0 | 0 | 0 | 0 | 0 | 0 | 1 | 0 |
| 22 | (Ghana) | MF | Anthony Annan | 9 | 1 | 0 | 0 | 0 | 0 | 1 | 0 | 10 | 1 |
| 27 | (Finland) | DF | Sebastian Sorsa | 3 | 0 | 0 | 0 | 0 | 0 | 1 | 0 | 4 | 0 |
| 31 | (Finland) | FW | Akseli Pelvas | 1 | 0 | 0 | 0 | 0 | 0 | 0 | 0 | 1 | 0 |
| 38 | (Finland) | MF | Sebastian Dahlström | 2 | 0 | 1 | 0 | 0 | 0 | 0 | 0 | 3 | 0 |
| 43 | (Ghana) | FW | Richard Gadze | 2 | 0 | 0 | 0 | 0 | 0 | 1 | 0 | 3 | 0 |
| 90 | (Nigeria) | FW | Nnamdi Oduamadi | 3 | 0 | 0 | 0 | 0 | 0 | 1 | 0 | 4 | 0 |
| TOTALS | | | | 79 | 6 | 6 | 0 | 6 | 1 | 15 | 0 | 106 | 7 |
