= Heikki Aho =

Heikki Aho may refer to:

- Heikki Aho (footballer) (born 1983), Finnish footballer
- Heikki Aho (filmmaker) (1895–1961), Finnish filmmaker
