= Drilon Shala =

Finnish footballer (born 1987)

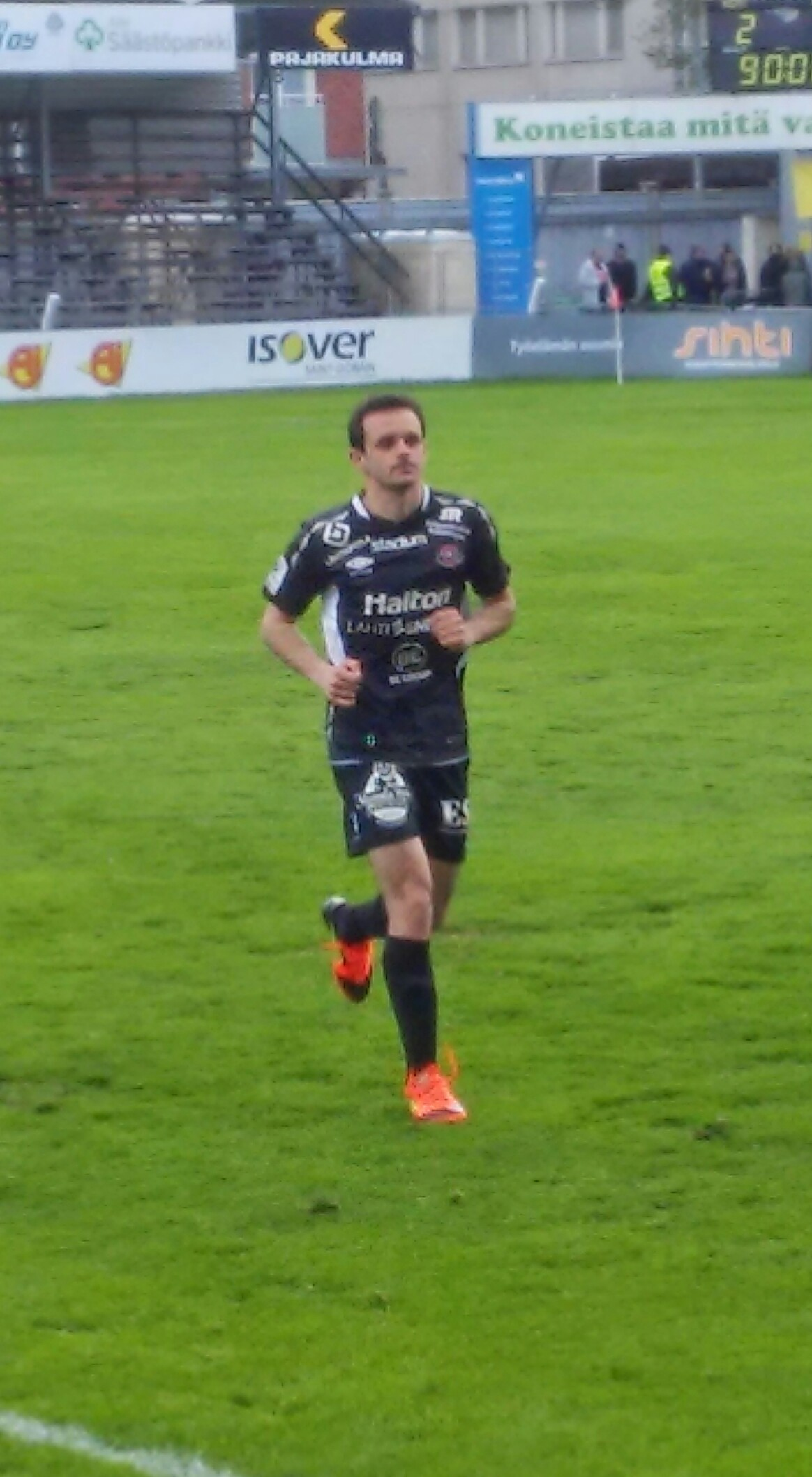
- Shala with Lahti in May 2015

Personal information
- Date of birth: 20 March 1987 (age 39)
- Place of birth: Lahti, Finland
- Height: 1.72 m (5 ft 8 in)
- Position: Striker

Youth career
- 2001–2006: Reipas

Senior career*
Years	Team	Apps	(Gls)
2006–2012	Lahti	122	(31)
2006	→ PP-70 (loan)	15	(2)
2007–2008	→ City Stars (loan)	4	(0)
2010	→ Hämeenlinna (loan)	2	(0)
2013	Tavşanlı Linyitspor	14	(0)
2013	PK-35 Vantaa	5	(0)
2014–2019	Lahti	63	(7)
2019–2021	Reipas	11	(0)

International career
2006	Finland U19	3	(0)
- * Club domestic league appearances and goals

Drilon Shala (born 20 March 1987) is a Finnish former professional footballer who played as a striker. He is of Albanian origin. His brother Driton is also a footballer.

== Club career ==
Shala progressed playing while at the Reipas youth academy. He made his breakthrough as a senior player for Lahti, playing for the club from 2006 to 2012.

On 17 January 2013, Shala moved to TFF First League club Tavşanlı Linyitspor. At the end his first season at the club, his contract was terminated by mutual agreement. Eventually he returned to Lahti, signing a two-year contract with his former club on 5 November 2013. There, he won the Finnish League Cup in 2016 with a 4–3 victory against SJK in the final; his third League Cup playing for Lahti. He retired from professional football in February 2020 returning for only one more season to play for his childhood club Reipas in the third-tier Kakkonen.

== International career ==
On 27 February 2006, five months after having been granted Finnish nationality, Shala made his debut for the Finland U19s as a substitute for Jami Puustinen during a 1–0 win against Norway.

== Career statistics ==
As of 23 February 2025

Appearances and goals by club, season and competition
Club	Season	League			Cup (Note: Includes Suomen Cup)		League cup (Note: Includes Finnish League Cup)		Europe		Total	
Club	Season	Division	Apps	Goals	Apps	Goals	Apps	Goals	Apps	Goals	Apps	Goals
Lahti	2006	Veikkausliiga	1	0	–		–		–		1	0
Lahti	2007	Veikkausliiga	3	0	–		–		–		3	0
Lahti	2008	Veikkausliiga	20	4	–		–		–		20	4
Lahti	2009	Veikkausliiga	26	8	3	2	6	0	6 (Note: Appearances in UEFA Europa League)	0	41	10
Lahti	2010	Veikkausliiga	21	4	–		–		–		21	4
Lahti	2011	Ykkönen	21	9	2	0	–		–		23	9
Lahti	2012	Veikkausliiga	30	7	2	1	3	0	–		35	8
Lahti	Total		122	32	7	3	9	0	6	0	144	35
PP-70 (loan)	2006	Ykkönen	15	2	–		–		–		15	2
City Stars (loan)	2007	Kakkonen	4	0	–		–		–		4	0
Hämeenlinna (loan)	2010	Ykkönen	2	0	–		–		–		2	0
Tavşanlı Linyitspor	2012–13	TFF 1. Lig	14	0	–		–		–		14	0
PK-35 Vantaa	2013	Ykkönen	5	0	–		–		–		5	0
Lahti	2014	Veikkausliiga	22	4	4	1	4	1	–		30	6
Lahti	2015	Veikkausliiga	25	3	2	0	3	0	2	0	32	3
Lahti	2016	Veikkausliiga	6	0	2	1	6	1	–		14	2
Lahti	2017	Veikkausliiga	10	0	1	0	–		–		11	0
Lahti	2018	Veikkausliiga	0	0	0	0	–		–		0	0
Lahti	2019	Veikkausliiga	2	0	0	0	–		–		2	0
Lahti	Total		65	7	9	1	13	2	2	0	89	10
Reipas Lahti	2019	Kakkonen	1	0	–		–		–		1	0
Reipas Lahti	2020	Kakkonen	2	0	–		–		–		2	0
Reipas Lahti	2021	Kakkonen	8	0	–		–		–		8	0
Reipas Lahti	Total		11	0	0	0	0	0	0	0	11	0
Kuusysi	2024	Kolmonen	6	2	1	0	–		–		7	2
Career total			244	43	17	4	22	2	8	0	291	49

== Honours ==
Lahti

- Ykkönen: 2011
- Finnish League Cup: 2007, 2013, 2016
