= Jasse Tuominen =

Finnish footballer (born 1995)

Personal information
- Full name: Jasse Sakari Tuominen
- Date of birth: 12 November 1995 (age 31)
- Place of birth: Kuopio, Finland
- Height: 1.87 m (6 ft 1 1/2 in)
- Position: Striker

Team information
- Current team: Inter Turku
- Number: 9

Senior career*
Years	Team	Apps	(Gls)
2013–2017	Lahti	34	(10)
2013–2014	→ Lahti Akatemia	8	(0)
2015	→ MP (loan)	19	(7)
2017–2019	BATE Borisov	34	(2)
2020–2022	Häcken	29	(2)
2022	→ Tromsø (loan)	26	(1)
2023	KuPS	23	(4)
2024	Bruk-Bet Termalica	1	(0)
2025–	Inter Turku	56	(11)

International career
2016	Finland U21	2	(1)
2017–2019	Finland	15	(1)
- * Club domestic league appearances and goals as of 12 November 2026

Jasse Tuominen (born 12 November 1995) is a Finnish professional footballer who plays as a striker for Veikkausliiga club Inter Turku.

== Club career ==
Born in Kuopio, Tuominen has played for Lahti, Lahti Akatemia and MP.

He signed for Belarusian club BATE Borisov in March 2017 on a three-year deal, for a €370,000 transfer fee.

In December 2019, Tuominen signed for Swedish club Häcken, starting in the 2020 season.

He was loaned out to Norwegian Eliteserien side Tromsø IL for the 2022 season.

After spending six years abroad, Tuominen returned to Finland in January 2023 and signed with Veikkausliiga club KuPS on a deal for the 2023 Veikkausliiga season. He left the club at the end of the year.

On 17 January 2024, he joined Polish club Bruk-Bet Termalica Nieciecza in the second-tier I liga on an eighteen-month contract. In March 2024, Tuominen underwent surgery on his meniscus, keeping him out of play for several months. Later he suffered another knee injury, after the club had pressured him to return to the pitch before he was fully game-fit. On 30 December, when he was close to returning to fitness, his contract was terminated.

In March 2025, Tuominen returned to Finland and signed with Inter Turku.

== International career ==
He made his international debut for Finland in 2017.

== Career statistics ==
=== Club ===
As of match played 17 May 2025

Appearances and goals by club, season and competition
Club	Season	League			National cup (Note: Includes Suomen Cup, Belarusian Cup, Svenska Cupen and Norwegian Cup)		Continental		Other		Total	
Club	Season	Division	Apps	Goals	Apps	Goals	Apps	Goals	Apps	Goals	Apps	Goals
Lahti Akatemia	2013	Kakkonen	6	0	—		—		—		6	0
Lahti Akatemia	2014	Kakkonen	2	0	—		—		—		2	0
Lahti Akatemia	Total		8	0	0	0	0	0	0	0	8	0
Lahti	2013	Veikkausliiga	1	0	0	0	—		1 (Note: Appearance(s) in Finnish League Cup)	0	2	0
Lahti	2014	Veikkausliiga	0	0	0	0	—		0	0	0	0
Lahti	2015	Veikkausliiga	6	0	0	0	—		0	0	6	0
Lahti	2016	Veikkausliiga	27	10	4	1	—		6	2	37	13
Lahti	Total		34	10	4	1	0	0	7	2	45	13
MP (loan)	2015	Ykkönen	19	7	—		—		—		19	7
BATE Borisov	2017	Belarusian Premier League	11	1	3	0	6 (Note: Three appearanes in UEFA Champions League, three appearances in UEFA Europa League)	0	—		20	1
BATE Borisov	2018	Belarusian Premier League	16	0	1	1	7 (Note: Three appearances and one goal in UEFA Champions League, four appearances and one goal in UEFA Europa League)	2	—		24	3
BATE Borisov	2019	Belarusian Premier League	7	1	2	3	7 (Note: Three appearances in UEFA Champions League, four appearances in UEFA Europa League)	0	—		16	4
BATE Borisov	Total		34	2	6	4	20	2	0	0	60	8
BK Häcken	2020	Allsvenskan	15	1	4	0	—		—		19	1
BK Häcken	2021	Allsvenskan	14	1	2	2	—		—		16	3
BK Häcken	Total		29	2	6	2	0	0	0	0	35	4
Tromsø (loan)	2022	Eliteserien	26	1	3	3	—		—		29	4
KuPS	2023	Veikkausliiga	23	4	2	1	2 (Note: Appearances in UEFA Europa Conference League)	1	5	1	32	7
Bruk-Bet Termalica	2023–24	I liga	1	0	0	0	—		—		1	0
Bruk-Bet Termalica	2024–25	I liga	0	0	0	0	—		—		1	0
Bruk-Bet Termalica	Total		1	0	0	0	0	0	0	0	1	0
Inter Turku	2025	Veikkausliiga	7	2	0	0	—		1	0	8	2
Career total			181	28	21	11	22	3	13	3	227	45

=== International ===
Appearances and goals by national team and year
National team	Year	Apps	Goals
Finland
Finland	2017	4	0
Finland	2018	7	0
Finland	2019	4	1
Total		15	1

Scores and results list Finland's goal tally first, score column indicates score after each Tuominen goal.

List of international goals scored by Jasse Tuominen
No.	Date	Venue	Opponent	Score	Result	Competition
1	15 November 2019	Telia 5G -areena, Helsinki, Finland	Liechtenstein	1–0	3–0	UEFA Euro 2020 qualification

== Honours ==
Lahti

- Finnish League Cup: 2013, 2016

BATE Borisov

- Belarusian Premier League: 2017, 2018
- Belarusian Premier League runner-up: 2019
- Belarusian Cup runner-up: 2017–18

Häcken

- Svenska Cupen runner-up: 2020–21

Kuopion Palloseura

- Veikkausliiga runner-up: 2023

Inter Turku

- Veikkausliiga: 2026
- Finnish Cup: 2026
- Finnish League Cup: 2026
