= Patrick Poutiainen =

Finnish footballer (born 1991)

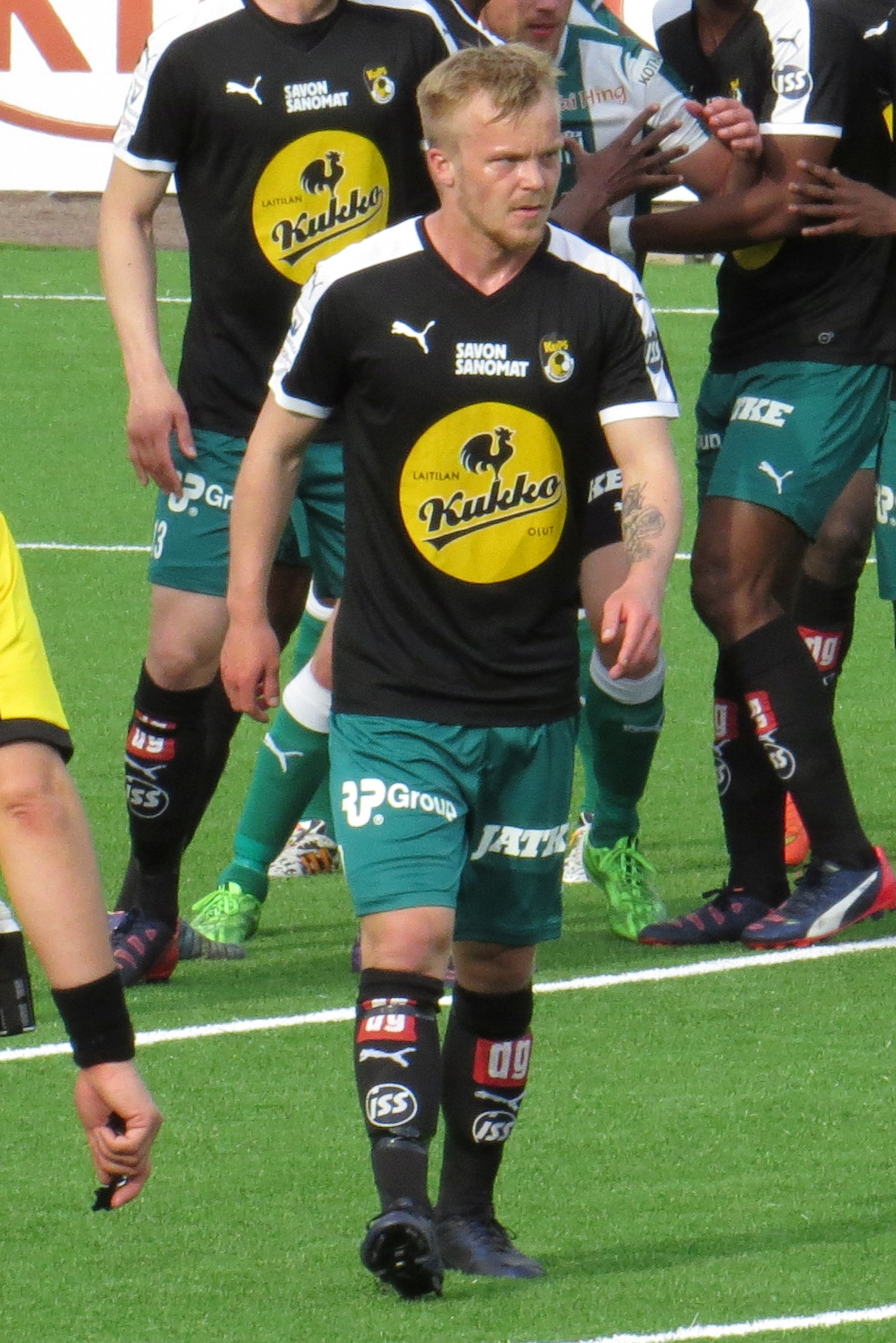

Personal information
- Date of birth: 14 June 1991 (age 35)
- Place of birth: Jyväskylä, Finland
- Height: 1.75 m (5 ft 9 in)
- Position: Midfielder

Team information
- Current team: KPV Kokkola
- Number: 23

Youth career
- JJK

Senior career*
Years	Team	Apps	(Gls)
2009–2013	JJK	105	(4)
2014	Haka	23	(1)
2015–2017	KuPS	42	(1)
2017	JJK	31	(1)
2018–	KPV Kokkola	2	(1)

International career
2012	Finland U21	1	(0)
- * Club domestic league appearances and goals as of 20 May 2018

Patrick Poutiainen (born 14 June 1991) is a Finnish football player currently playing for Kokkolan Palloveikot.
