= Heikki Aho (footballer) =

Finnish footballer (born 1983)

Personal information
- Date of birth: 16 March 1983 (age 43)
- Place of birth: Muurame, Finland
- Height: 1.82 m (6 ft 0 in)
- Position: Defender

Senior career*
Years	Team	Apps	(Gls)
2000–2008	Tampere United	129	(1)
2000	→ NoPy (loan)	16	(0)
2007	→ PP-70 (loan)	1	(0)
2008	→ TPV (loan)	7	(0)
2009–2012	FF Jaro	72	(3)
2013–2017	Ilves	80	(5)
- * Club domestic league appearances and goals

Heikki Aho (born 16 March 1983) is a retired Finnish footballer, who played as a defender. He represented Tampere United and won three Finnish championships before moving to FF Jaro for the 2009 season.
