= Matias Hänninen =

Finnish footballer (born 1991)

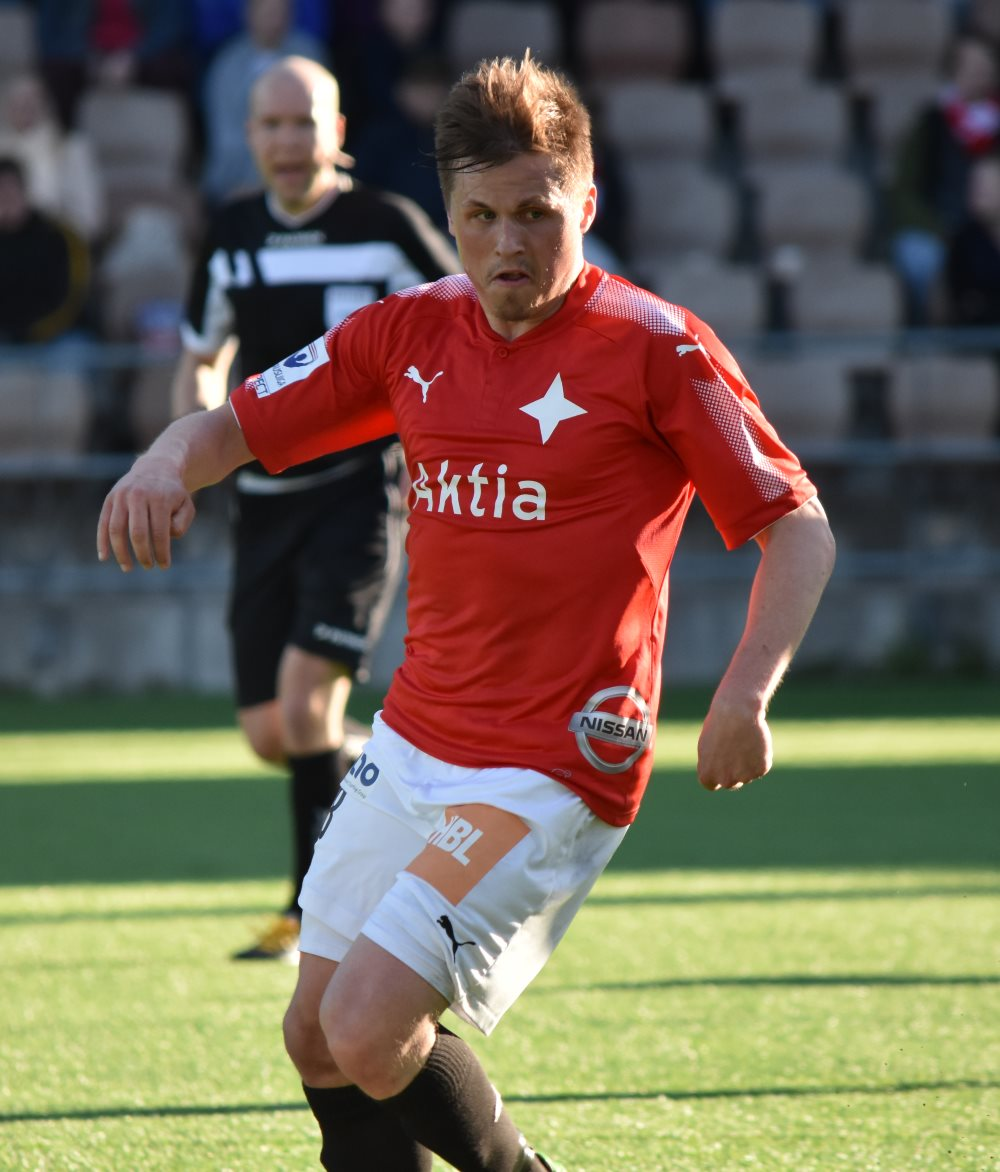

Personal information
- Date of birth: 15 March 1991 (age 35)
- Height: 1.72 m (5 ft 7 1/2 in)
- Position: Midfielder

Team information
- Current team: HIFK
- Number: 18

Senior career*
Years	Team	Apps	(Gls)
2011–2020	HIFK	184	(14)
2011	→ Kiffen (loan)	3	(0)
2015	→ Gnistan (loan)	1	(1)
2016	→ Gnistan (loan)	1	(0)
2021–2022	PK-35	33	(0)
2023–	HIFK	24	(0)
- * Club domestic league appearances and goals as of 27 November 2023

Matias Hänninen (born 15 March 1991) is a Finnish professional footballer who plays for HIFK, as a midfielder.

== Career ==
Hänninen has played for HIFK, Kiffen and Gnistan.

On 9 January 2023, Hänninen returned to HIFK after two seasons away from the club.
