= Mika Hilander =

Finnish footballer (born 1983)

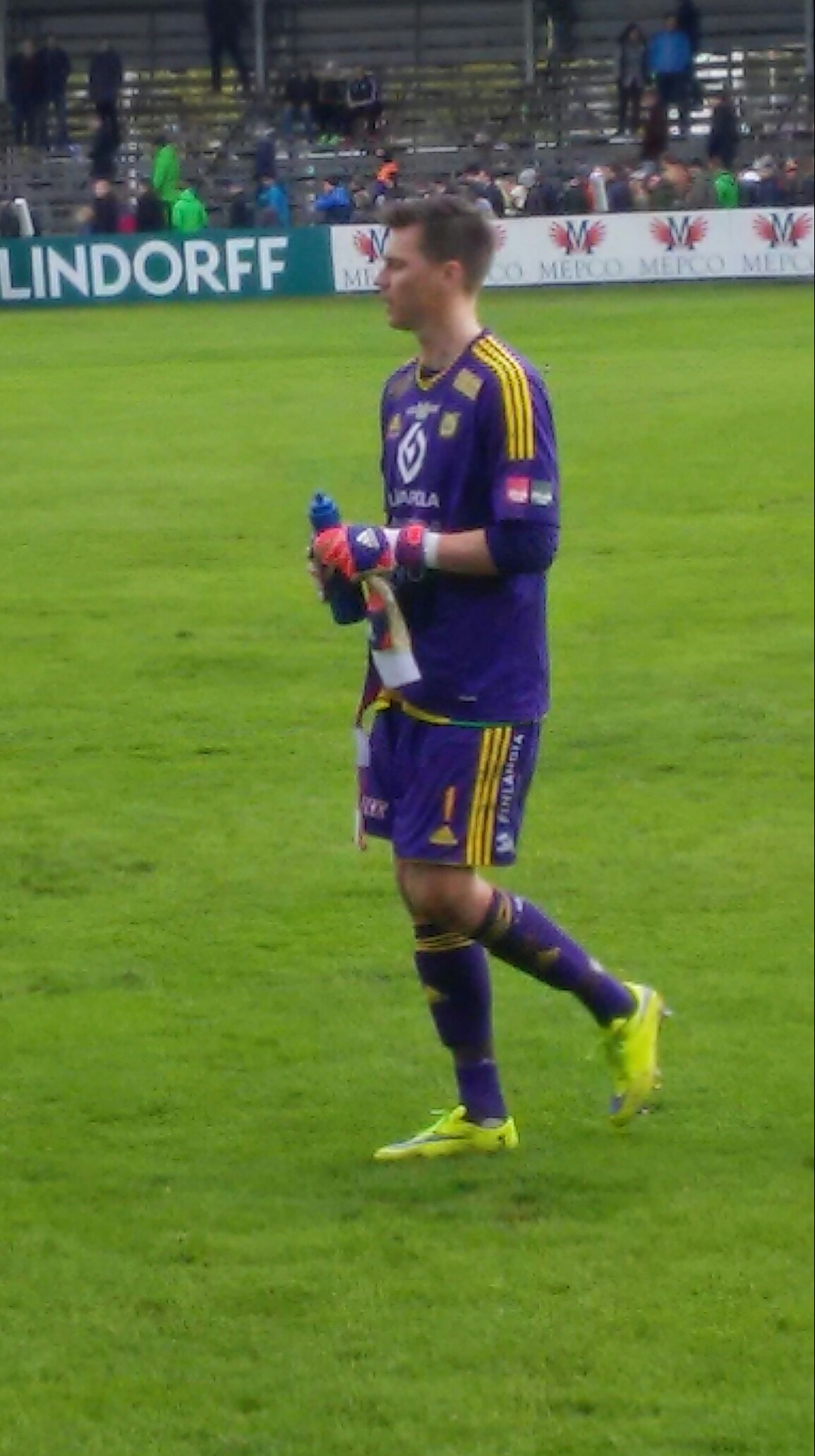
- Hilander with Ilves in 2015

Personal information
- Date of birth: 17 August 1983 (age 43)
- Place of birth: Tampere, Finland
- Height: 1.92 m (6 ft 3 1/2 in)
- Position: Goalkeeper

Senior career*
Years	Team	Apps	(Gls)
2004–2007	Tampere United	0	(0)
2007	→ PP-70 (loan)	14	(0)
2008	NoPS	3	(0)
2009	TPV	0	(0)
2010	Tampere United	16	(0)
2011–2013	KuPS	69	(0)
2014–2020	Ilves	193	(0)
2021–2022	Haka	22	(0)

International career
2016–2017	Finland	2	(0)
- * Club domestic league appearances and goals

Mika Hilander (born 17 August 1983) is a Finnish former football player and goalkeeper.

He has played for Tampere United, KuPS, Ilves and FC Haka in Veikkausliiga, and for NoPS, PP-70 and TPV in lower divisions.

== Honours ==
=== Individual ===
- Veikkausliiga Player of the Month: July 2015, August 2015
- Veikkausliiga Goalkeeper of the Year: 2019
- Veikkausliiga Team of the Year: 2019
