= Mika Lahtinen =

Finnish footballer (born 1985)

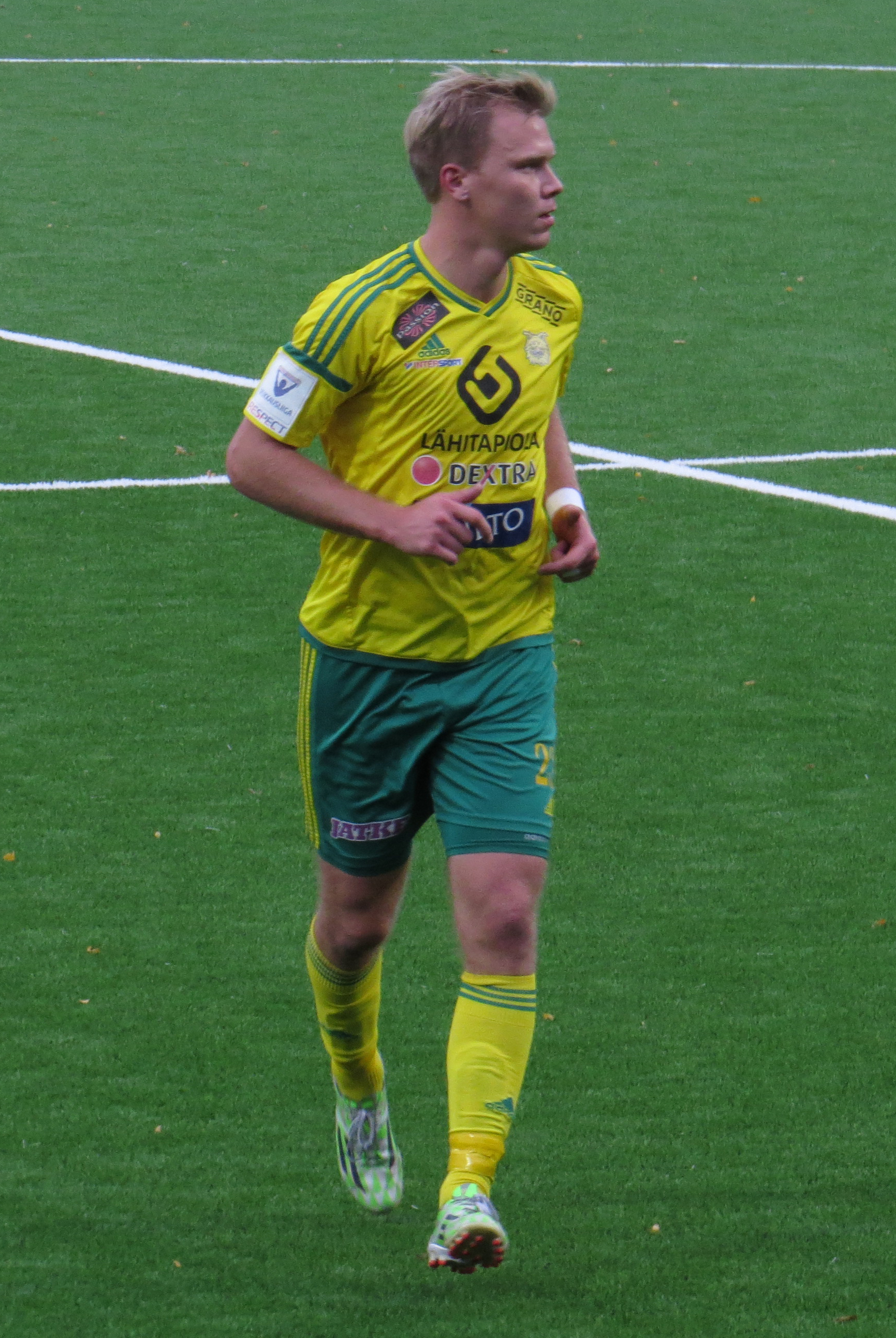
- Mika Lahtinen in 2015

Personal information
- Date of birth: 30 April 1985 (age 41)
- Place of birth: Tampere, Finland
- Height: 1.88 m (6 ft 2 in)
- Position: Forward

Youth career
- Ilves

Senior career*
Years	Team	Apps	(Gls)
2003–2006	Tampere United	52	(7)
2006	→FC Hämeenlinna (loan)	10	(1)
2006	→RoPS (loan)	14	(6)
2007	PP-70	25	(17)
2008–2010	JJK	76	(18)
2011	Tampere United	0	(0)
2011–2014	RoPS	92	(21)
2014–	Ilves	36	(10)
- * Club domestic league appearances and goals as of 21 May 2014

Mika Lahtinen (born 30 April 1985) is a Finnish former footballer. During his career he played for RoPS, JJK and Tampere United in the Veikkausliiga, and for PP-70 and FC Hämeenlinna in the Ykkönen.
