= Ari Nyman =

Finnish footballer (born 1984)

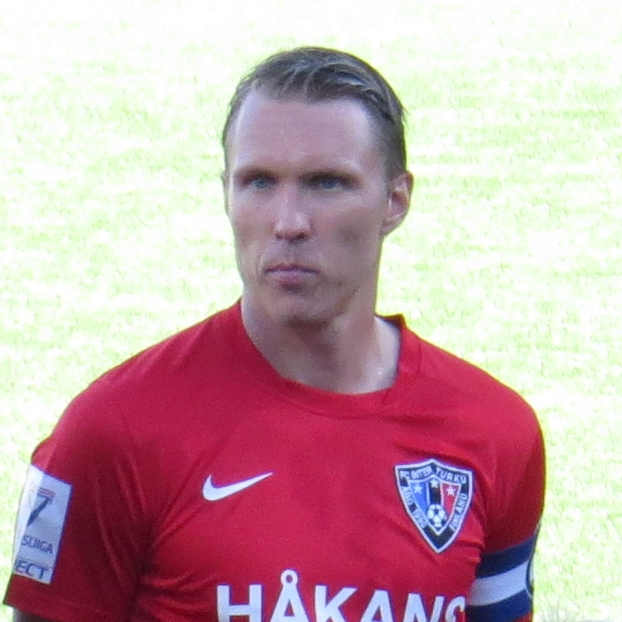
- Nyman in 2015

Personal information
- Date of birth: 7 February 1984 (age 42)
- Place of birth: Turku, Finland
- Height: 1.85 m (6 ft 1 in)
- Positions: Defender; defensive midfielder

Senior career*
Years	Team	Apps	(Gls)
2000–2007	Inter Turku	124	(3)
2007–2009	Thun	64	(1)
2009–2018	Inter Turku	281	(3)

International career
2004–2010	Finland	22	(0)
- * Club domestic league appearances and goals

Ari Nyman (born 7 February 1984) is a retired Finnish footballer. He played both as a defensive midfielder or centre-back. Nyman has also played at right-back for Finland.

== Club career ==
=== FC Inter Turku ===
Nyman played his first match with Inter Turku in 2000 when he was only 16 years old. In 2002, he was named for the best under-21 player in Finland. He served as a loyal member of Inter for six seasons, before leaving abroad. He visited Vålerenga on trial, before joining FC Thun in Swiss Super League.

=== FC Thun ===
Nyman was signed by FC Thun for €600,000 in 2007. He immediately broke into the Thun side and played regularly in the first team.

Thun was relegated after scandalous season 2007–2008 and Nyman stated that he wants to leave. He was on trial with VfB Stuttgart, but didn't get an offer.

=== Back to Turku ===
It was rumoured for a long time, that unhappy Nyman was moving back to Inter Turku because of Thun's financial problems. Finally in April 2009, Inter announced that Nyman had signed for three years. He was labeled the successor to Dominic Chatto as a controlling midfielder.

Nyman decided to retire, after the 2018 season. During his career, he made 406 appearances in Veikkausliiga, making him the third-most capped player in Finnish top tier, behind Toni Huttunen and Mikko Hauhia.

== International career ==
Nyman made his debut for the Finland national football team against Bahrain on 1 December 2004. He is a back-up of Finland's defence, usually playing at right-back for Finland as a substitute for Petri Pasanen. He played for Finland on youth levels and in 2002 was voted for the under-21 footballer of the year.

== Career statistics ==
=== Club ===
Appearances and goals by club, season and competition
Club	Season	League			Domestic Cups (Note: Includes Suomen Cup, Swiss Cup and Finnish League Cup)		Europe		Total	
Club	Season	Division	Apps	Goals	Apps	Goals	Apps	Goals	Apps	Goals
Inter Turku	2000	Veikkausliiga	1	0	–		–		1	0
Inter Turku	2001	Veikkausliiga	2	0	–		–		2	0
Inter Turku	2002	Veikkausliiga	28	0	–		–		28	0
Inter Turku	2003	Veikkausliiga	26	0	–		–		26	0
Inter Turku	2004	Veikkausliiga	26	0	–		–		26	0
Inter Turku	2005	Veikkausliiga	19	0	–		1 (Note: Includes UEFA Intertoto Cup)	0	20	0
Inter Turku	2006	Veikkausliiga	23	3	–		–		23	3
Inter Turku	Total		125	3	0	0	1	0	126	1
Thun	2006–07	Swiss Super League	18	0	–		–		18	0
Thun	2007–08	Swiss Super League	31	1	4	0	–		35	1
Thun	2008–09	Swiss Challenge League	15	0	2	0	–		17	0
Thun	Total		64	1	6	0	0	0	70	1
Inter Turku	2009	Veikkausliiga	25	0	4	0	2 (Note: Includes UEFA Champions League)	0	31	0
Inter Turku	2010	Veikkausliiga	25	1	3	0	2 (Note: Includes UEFA Europa League)	0	30	1
Inter Turku	2011	Veikkausliiga	32	1	0	0	–		32	1
Inter Turku	2012	Veikkausliiga	31	0	8	0	2	0	41	0
Inter Turku	2013	Veikkausliiga	25	0	6	0	2	0	33	0
Inter Turku	2014	Veikkausliiga	29	0	8	0	–		37	0
Inter Turku	2015	Veikkausliiga	31	0	8	0	–		39	0
Inter Turku	2016	Veikkausliiga	29	0	8	0	–		37	0
Inter Turku	2017	Veikkausliiga	29	1	5	0	–		34	1
Inter Turku	2018	Veikkausliiga	27	0	7	0	–		34	0
Inter Turku	Total		281	3	57	0	8	0	346	3
Career total			470	7	63	0	9	0	542	7

=== International ===
As of match played 21 May 2010

Finland
Year	Apps	Goals
2004	2	0
2005	6	0
2006	5	0
2007	1	0
2008	4	0
2009	2	0
2010	2	0
Total	22	0

== Honours ==
Inter Turku

- Finnish Cup: 2009, 2018
