= Joni Aho =

Finnish footballer (born 1986)

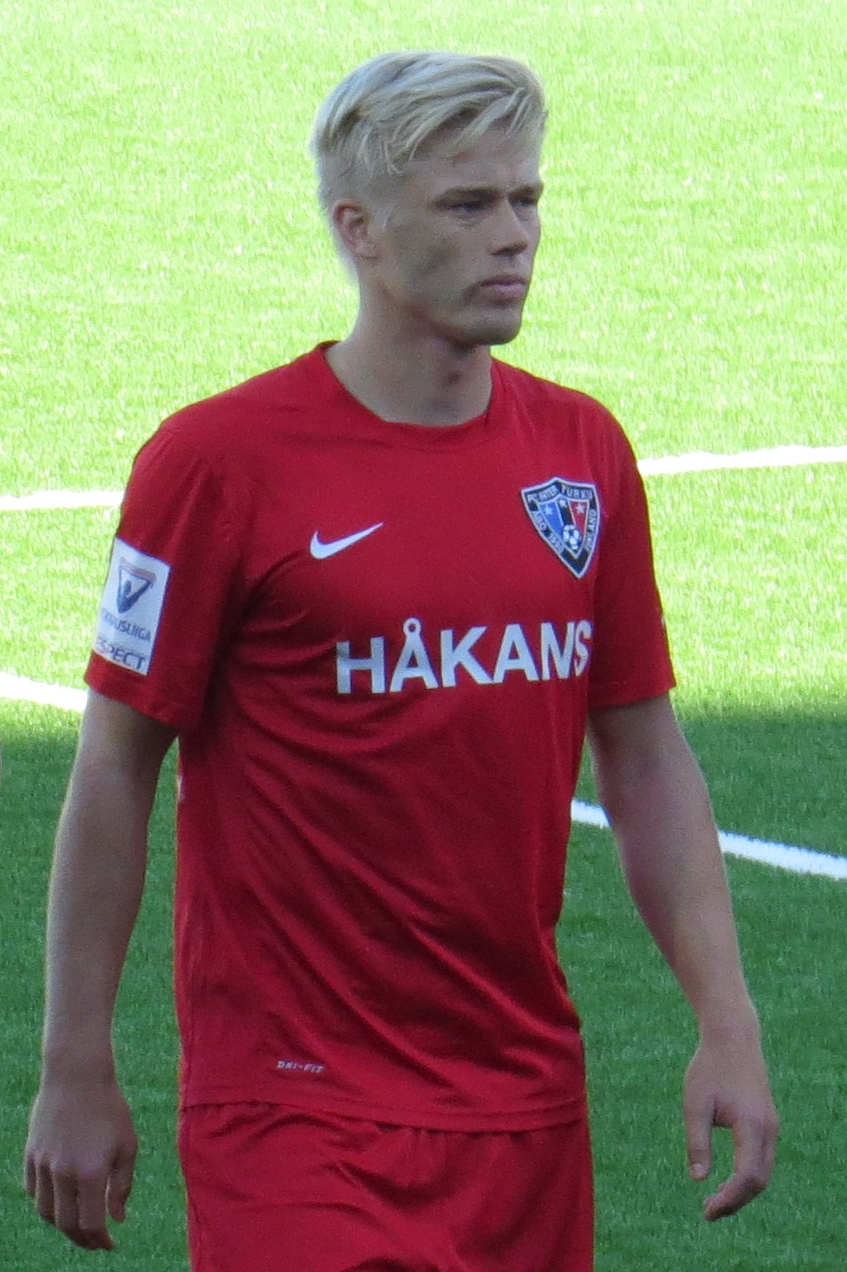
- Aho with Inter Turku in 2015

Personal information
- Date of birth: 12 April 1986 (age 40)
- Place of birth: Kaarina, Finland
- Height: 1.80 m (5 ft 11 in)
- Position: Right-back

Youth career
- 1998–2005: Inter Turku

Senior career*
| Years | Team | Apps | (Gls) |
| 2005–2006 | VG-62 | 21 | (2) |
| 2006–2013 | Inter Turku | 174 | (6) |
| 2013–2014 | Lahti | 25 | (0) |
| 2014–2017 | Inter Turku | 70 | (6) |

International career
| 2007–2009 | Finland U21 | 13 | (0) |
| 2009–2012 | Finland | 3 | (0) |
- * Club domestic league appearances and goals

Joni Aho (born 12 April 1986) is a Finnish former professional footballer who played as a right-back.

== International career ==
Aho was part of the Finland U21s during the 2009 UEFA European Under-21 Championship in Sweden.

In early 2009, Aho was called up to the Finland senior squad. He made his debut in a friendly against Japan on 4 February, starting in the 5–1 loss.
