= Janne Turpeenniemi =

Finnish footballer (born 1989)

Personal information
- Date of birth: 17 May 1989 (age 37)
- Place of birth: Rovaniemi, Finland
- Height: 1.75 m (5 ft 9 in)
- Position: Defender

Team information
- Current team: BBK
- Number: 18

Youth career
- RoPS

Senior career*
Years	Team	Apps	(Gls)
2005–2011	RoPS	140	(3)
2012	JJK	22	(0)
2013–	Assi		
	BBK	0	(0)

International career
- Finland U-18
	Finland U-19	5	(1)
- * Club domestic league appearances and goals

Janne Turpeenniemi (born 17 May 1989) is a Finnish footballer currently playing for Bodens BK. His father Jorma played also in RoPS as sweeper and is the current Director of Football of RoPS.

== Career ==
During his career Turpeeniemi has been playing in midfield, as a right winger and as a right full back. He has been occasionally playing as a central defender, when the team has been hit with injuries and bans. The last years he has played in defensive positions. In 2006, he had trials with English side Plymouth Argyle F.C.

He has represented Finland in U-18 and U-19 levels. He scored his first goal in U-19 team against Romania on 22 March 2008. 8 January 2010 Turpeenniemi was called to Eerikkilä Finnish under-21 training camp.

During the 2010 season, Turpeenniemi is the captain of RoPS. He joined than after the 2011 season to Veikkausliiga arriver Jyväskylän Jalkapalloklubi.

Turpeenniemi signed in January 2013 with Assi IF and played here with his Finnish compatriots Jussi-Esko Berg, Lars Juntti, Erik Juntti, Andreas Liakka, Robin Parviainen and Juoni Talvensaari.

Turpeeniemi signed in January 2014 with Bodens BK for the 2014 season.
