= Mateo Míguez =

Spanish footballer

Mateo
Personal information
- Full name: Mateo Míguez Adán
- Date of birth: 11 May 1987 (age 39)
- Place of birth: Redondela, Spain
- Height: 1.75 m (5 ft 9 in)
- Position: Attacking midfielder

Youth career
- Celta

Senior career*
Years	Team	Apps	(Gls)
2006–2011	Celta B	114	(20)
2010–2011	Celta	3	(0)
2011–2013	Ponferradina	21	(5)
2013	Guadalajara	17	(1)
2014–2015	Coruxo	37	(7)
2015–2016	PK-35	31	(9)
2016–2024	Coruxo	183	(23)
- * Club domestic league appearances and goals as of 8 May 2024

Mateo Míguez Adán (born 11 May 1987 in Redondela, Galicia), known simply as Mateo, is a Spanish footballer who plays as an attacking midfielder.

== Career statistics ==
As of match played 23 May 2021

Appearances and goals by club, season and competition
Club	Season	League			National Cup		Other		Total	
Club	Season	Division	Apps	Goals	Apps	Goals	Apps	Goals	Apps	Goals
Celta B	2006–07	Segunda División B	11	1	—		—		11	1
Celta B	2007–08	Segunda División B	20	2	—		—		20	2
Celta B	2008–09	Segunda División B	20	2	—		—		20	2
Celta B	2009–10	Segunda División B	31	5	—		—		31	5
Celta B	2010–11	Segunda División B	32	10	—		—		32	10
Celta B	Total		114	20	0	0	0	0	114	20
Celta	2009–10	Segunda División	1	0	1	0	—		2	0
Celta	2010–11	Segunda División	2	0	0	0	—		2	0
Celta	Total		3	0	1	0	0	0	4	0
Ponferradina	2011–12	Segunda División B	17	5	4	0	5 (Note: Appearances in promotion playoffs)	1	26	6
Ponferradina	2012–13	Segunda División	4	0	2	0	—		6	0
Ponferradina	Total		21	5	6	0	5	1	32	6
Guadalajara	2013–14	Segunda División B	17	1	1	0	—		18	1
Coruxo	2013–14	Segunda División B	13	3	—		—		13	3
Coruxo	2014–15	Segunda División B	24	4	—		—		24	4
PK-35	2015	Ykkönen	22	7	0	0	1	0	23	7
PK-35	2016	Veikkausliiga	9	2	1	1	4 (Note: Appearances in Finnish League Cup)	0	14	3
PK-35	Total		31	9	1	1	5	0	37	10
Coruxo	2016–17	Segunda División B	20	2	—		—		20	2
Coruxo	2017–18	Segunda División B	36	3	—		2	0	38	3
Coruxo	2018–19	Segunda División B	25	3	—		—		25	3
Coruxo	2019–20	Segunda División B	25	3	1	0	—		26	3
Coruxo	2020–21	Segunda División B	25	2	1	0	—		26	2
Coruxo	Total		131	13	2	0	2	0	135	13
Career total			354	55	11	1	12	1	377	57
