= Mattias Gestranius =

Finnish football referee (born 1978)

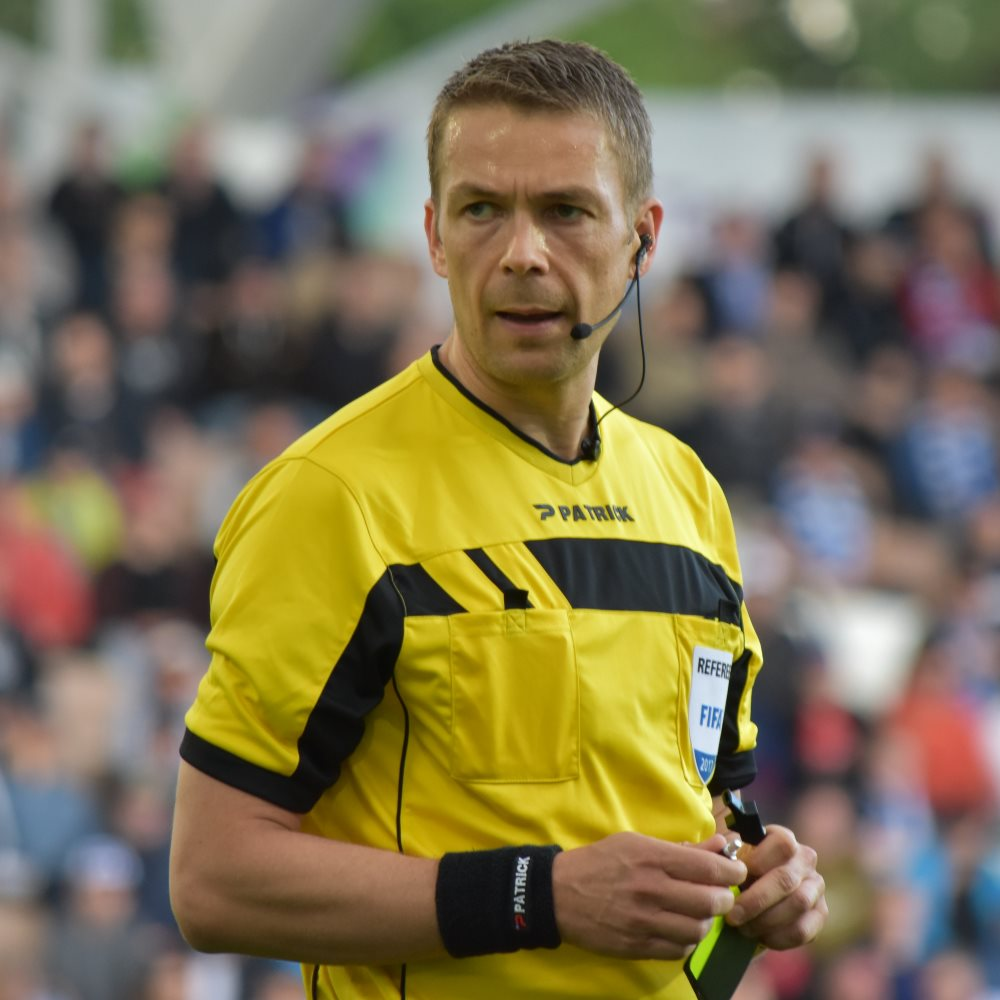
- Born: 7 June 1978 (age 48); Pargas, Finland

Domestic
Years	League	Role
2006–2022	Veikkausliiga	Referee

International
Years	League	Role
2009–	FIFA listed	Referee

Mattias Gestranius (born 7 June 1978) is a Finnish former professional football referee. He has been a full international for FIFA since 2011. He is a laboratory technician. He refereed his last official match in Veikkausliiga on 6 April 2022.
