= Joni Korhonen =

Finnish footballer (born 1987)

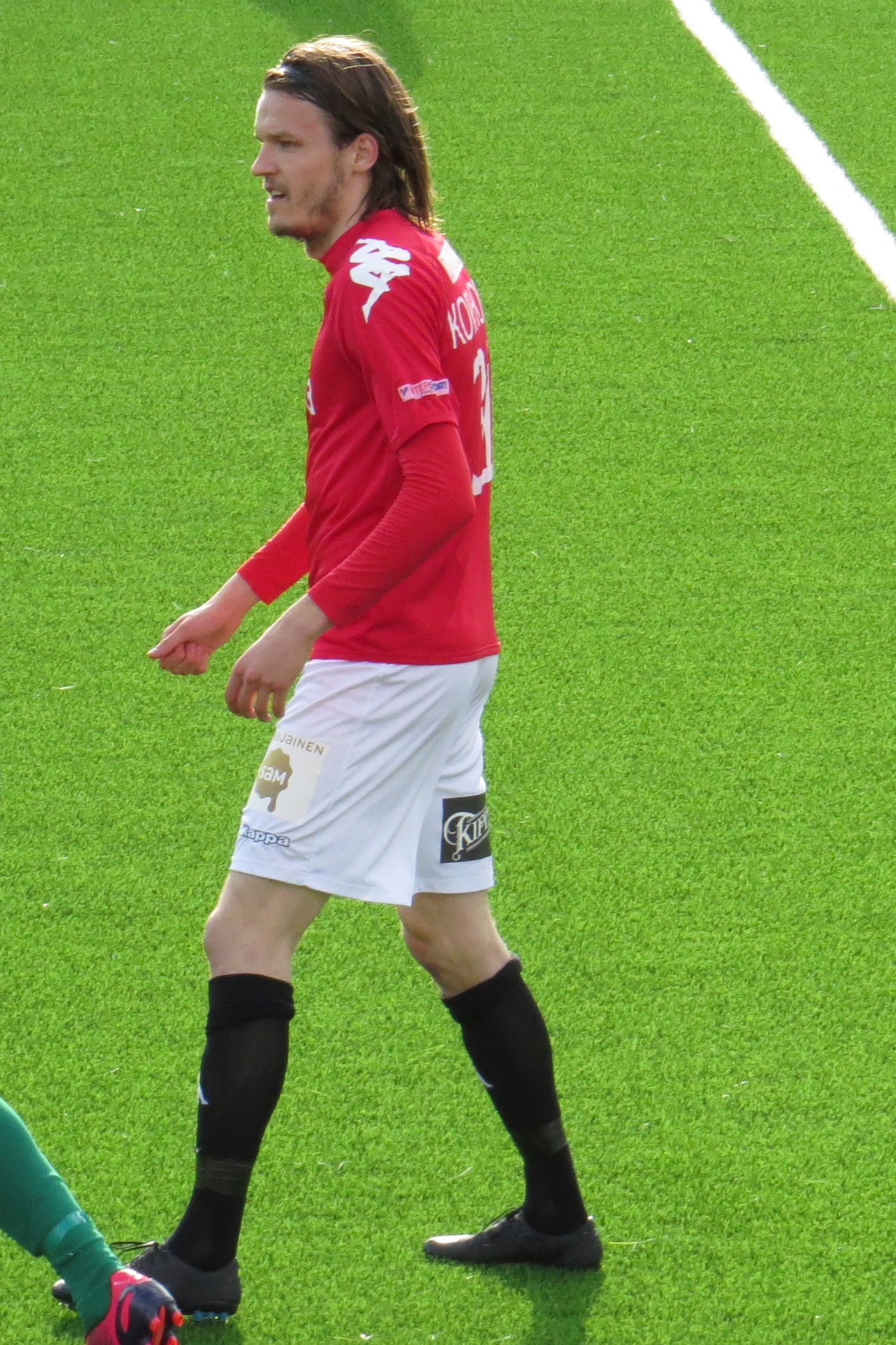
- Joni Korhonen playing for HIFK

Personal information
- Date of birth: 8 February 1987 (age 39)
- Place of birth: Espoo, Finland
- Height: 1.82 m (5 ft 11 1/2 in)
- Position: Winger

Team information
- Current team: PK-35
- Number: 31

Senior career*
Years	Team	Apps	(Gls)
2005–2006	FC Honka	0	(0)
2005	→ FCK Salamat (loan)	2	(0)
2006	→ FC Espoo (loan)	15	(5)
2007	Bonner SC	8	(1)
2007	Klubi 04	14	(1)
2008	FC Espoo	20	(9)
2009	AC Oulu	24	(3)
2010	FC Espoo	26	(0)
2011–2013	FC Viikingit	76	(18)
2014	PK-35	27	(8)
2015–2017	Helsinki IFK	60	(4)
2017–2018	FC Honka	42	(10)
2019	AC Oulu	27	(2)
2019–	PK-35	0	(0)
- * Club domestic league appearances and goals as of 01:06, 9 May 2020 (UTC)

Joni Korhonen (born 8 February 1987) is a Finnish football player who currently plays for the Ykkönen side PK-35 in Finland.

== Career ==
=== Club career ===
In December 2018, it was confirmed that Korhonen had joined AC Oulu, the club he played for in 2009. He made 31 appearances for the team before leaving at the end of 2019, after signing with PK-35 Vantaa for the 2020 season.
