= Marcus Heimonen =

Finnish footballer (born 1993)

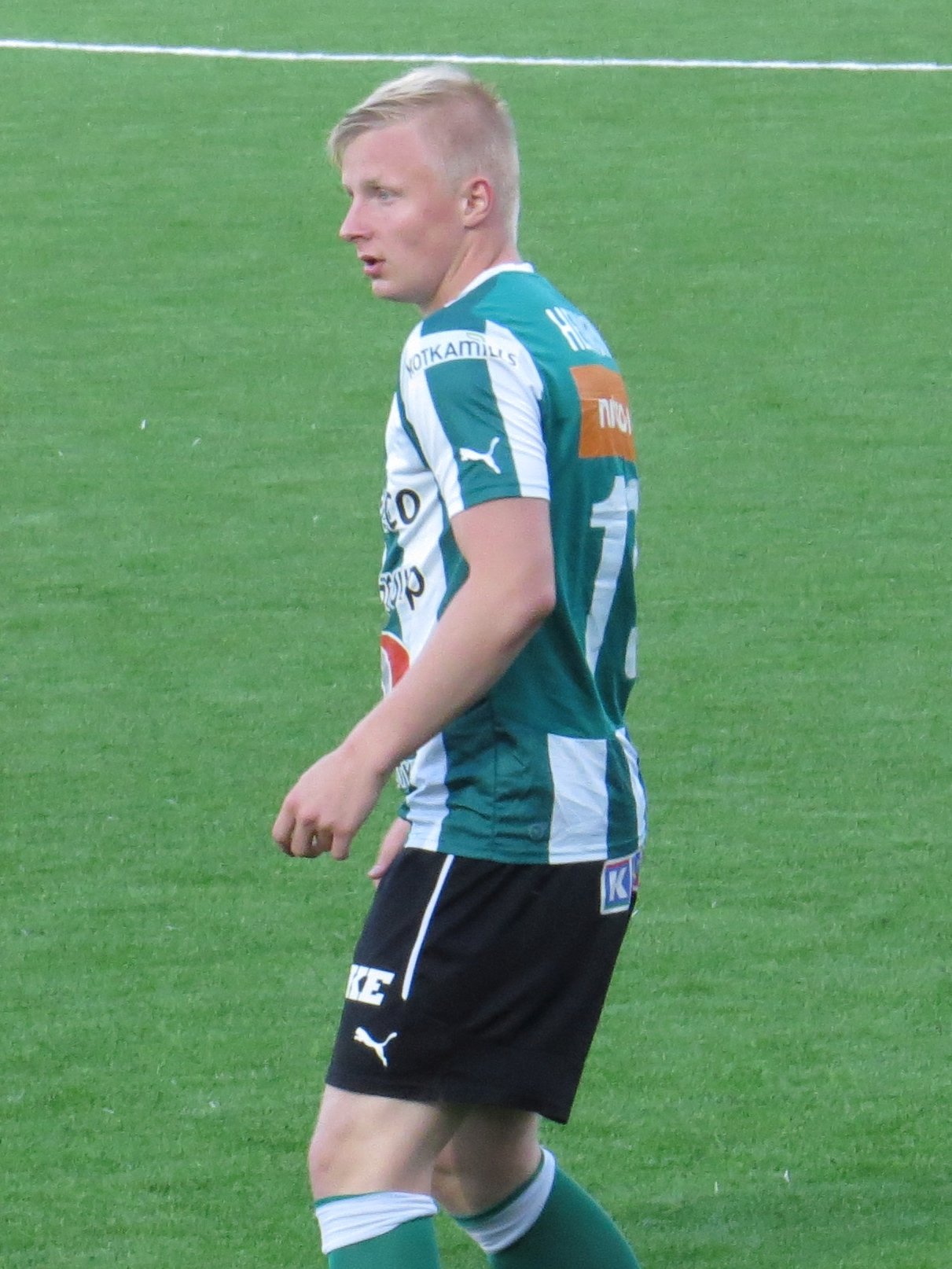
- Marcus Heimonen in 2015

Personal information
- Full name: Marcus Heimonen
- Date of birth: 11 October 1993 (age 33)
- Place of birth: Vantaa, Finland
- Height: 1.79 m (5 ft 10 in)
- Position: Defensive midfielder

Youth career
- –2012: PK-35 Vantaa

Senior career*
Years	Team	Apps	(Gls)
2012	PK-35 Vantaa	9	(0)
2012	→ HIFK (loan)	3	(0)
2013–2015	FC Honka	18	(0)
2015	PK-35 Vantaa	0	(0)
2015–2016	KTP	16	(0)
2015	→ Sudet (loan)	3	(0)
2016–2017	PK-35 Vantaa	24	(0)
2017–2019	IF Gnistan	18	(1)

International career
2013	Finland U-19	2	(1)
2013–2014	Finland U-21	2	(0)
- * Club domestic league appearances and goals as of 26 April 2019

Marcus Heimonen (born 11 October 1993) is a Finnish professional footballer who is a free agent. His playing position is defensive midfielder. He was also a member of the Finland national team and a team player for Gnistan. His preferred position is defensive midfielder, but he can play in other midfield roles.
