= Babacar Diallo =

Senegalese football player

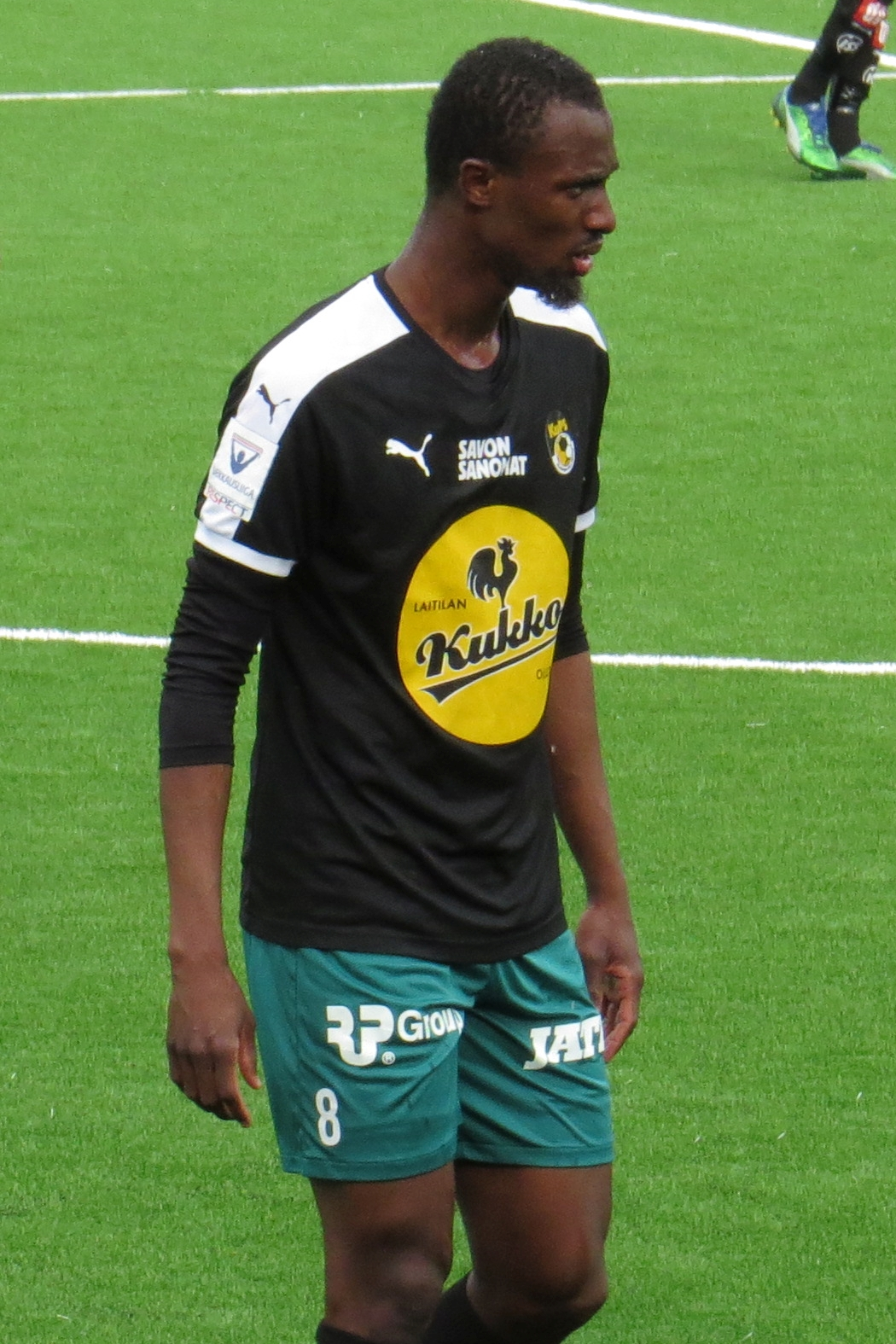
- Diallo with KuPS in 2015

Personal information
- Date of birth: 25 March 1989 (age 37)
- Place of birth: Dakar, Senegal
- Height: 1.93 m (6 ft 4 in)
- Position: Centre back

Youth career
- Amiens SC
- Paris FC

Senior career*
Years	Team	Apps	(Gls)
2009–2011	Dardanelspor	17	(1)
2010–2011	→ Güngörenspor (loan)	27	(0)
2011–2013	Inter Turku	29	(2)
2014	Rochester Rhinos	23	(1)
2015–2017	KuPS	63	(3)
2017–2018	St. Pölten	30	(1)
2019	KuPS	18	(3)
2020	Terengganu F.C.	3	(0)
- * Club domestic league appearances and goals

Babacar Diallo (born 25 March 1989) is a Senegalese former footballer.

== Career statistics ==
Appearances and goals by club, season and competition
Club	Season	League			Cup (Note: Includes Turkish Cup, Suomen Cup and Austrian Cup)		League cup (Note: Includes Finnish League Cup)		Europe		Total	
Club	Season	Division	Apps	Goals	Apps	Goals	Apps	Goals	Apps	Goals	Apps	Goals
Dardanelspor	2009–10	TFF 1. Lig	17	1	1	0	–		–		18	1
Güngörenspor (loan)	2010–11	TFF 1. Lig	27	0	1	0	–		–		28	0
Inter Turku	2011	Veikkausliiga	9	1	–		–		–		9	1
Inter Turku	2012	Veikkausliiga	7	0	0	0	6	0	2 (Note: Appearances in UEFA Europa League)	0	15	0
Inter Turku	2013	Veikkausliiga	13	1	1	1	5	1	0	0	19	3
Inter Turku	Total		29	2	1	1	11	1	2	0	43	4
Rochester Rhinos	2014	USL Pro	23	1	0	0	0	0	–		23	1
KuPS	2015	Veikkausliiga	32	1	4	0	–		–		36	1
KuPS	2016	Veikkausliiga	31	2	4	0	2	0	–		37	2
KuPS	Total		63	3	8	0	2	0	0	0	73	3
St. Pölten	2016–17	Austrian Bundesliga	12	0	1	0	–		–		13	0
St. Pölten	2017–18	Austrian Bundesliga	18	1	1	0	–		–		19	1
St. Pölten	Total		30	1	2	0	0	0	0	0	32	1
KuPS	2019	Veikkausliiga	18	3	0	0	–		4	1	22	4
Terengganu	2019	Malaysia Super League	3	0	–		–		–		3	0
Career total			210	11	13	1	13	1	6	1	242	14

== Honours ==
Individual

- Veikkausliiga Team of the Year: 2019
