= Eero Peltonen =

Finnish footballer (born 1986)

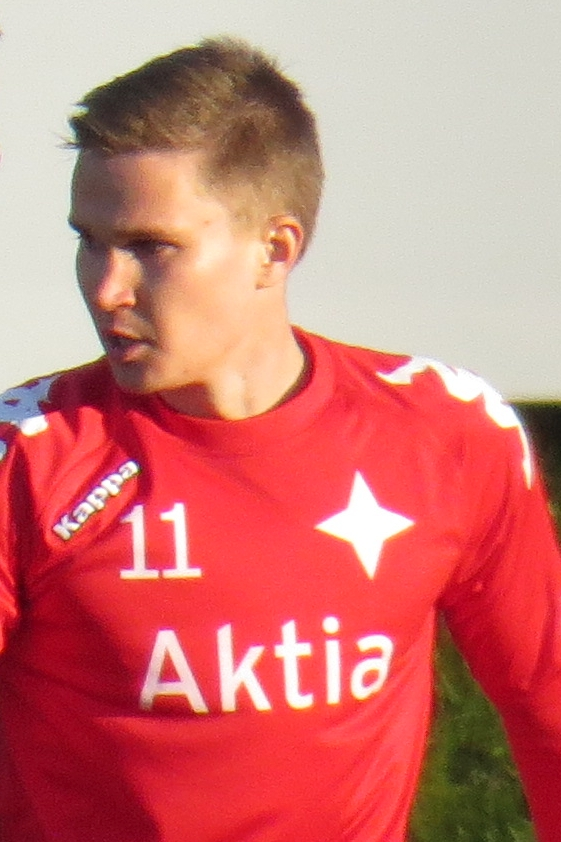
- Eero Peltonen playing for HIFK in 2015

Personal information
- Full name: Eero Santeri Peltonen
- Date of birth: 22 December 1986 (age 39)
- Place of birth: Nurmijärvi, Finland
- Height: 1.77 m (5 ft 10 in)
- Position: Striker

Senior career*
Years	Team	Apps	(Gls)
2004–2005	PK-35 Vantaa	22	(6)
2005–2006	Crystal Palace	0	(0)
2006–2008	MYPA	34	(2)
2008–2013	Viikingit	79	(30)
2014–2016	HIFK	68	(15)
2016	→ Gnistan (loan)	1	(0)
- * Club domestic league appearances and goals as of 31 December 2016

Eero Santeri Peltonen (born 22 December 1986) is a Finnish former football striker. He played for MyPa of the Veikkausliiga until 2008.
