= Mikko Hauhia =

Finnish footballer (born 1984)

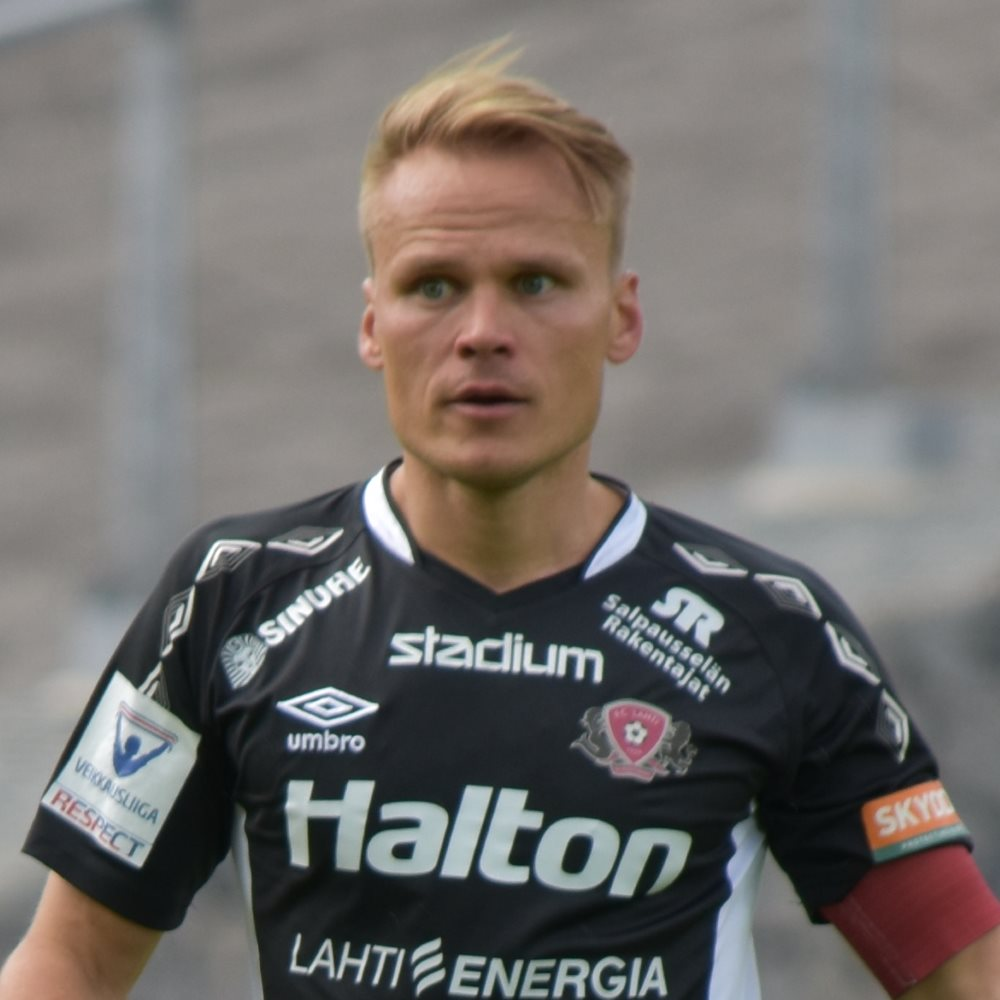
- Hauhia with FC Lahti in 2017

Personal information
- Date of birth: 3 September 1984 (age 42)
- Place of birth: Lahti, Finland
- Height: 1.70 m (5 ft 7 in)
- Position: Defender

Youth career
- Reipas Lahti
- Kuusysi

Senior career*
Years	Team	Apps	(Gls)
2003–2007	Lahti	112	(3)
2008–2009	HJK	46	(0)
2010	Akademisk BK	14	(1)
2010	HJK	1	(0)
2011–2019	Lahti	281	(9)

International career
2004–2005	Finland U-21	18	(0)
- * Club domestic league appearances and goals

Mikko Hauhia (born 3 September 1984) is a Finnish former professional footballer. During his career, he made 416 appearances in Veikkausliiga, making him the second most capped player in the Finnish top-tier, behind Toni Huttunen. Hauhia won two Finnish championship titles and one Finnish Cup title with HJK, and additionally won the Finnish League Cup twice with his hometown club FC Lahti, and also captained the FC Lahti team. He had a short stint in Denmark with AB in 2010.

== Career statistics ==
As of 4 October 2024.

Appearances and goals by club, season and competition
Club	Season	League			Cup (Note: Includes Suomen Cup)		League cup (Note: Includes Finnish League Cup)		Europe		Total	
Club	Season	Division	Apps	Goals	Apps	Goals	Apps	Goals	Apps	Goals	Apps	Goals
Lahti	2003	Veikkausliiga	21	0	–		–		–		21	0
Lahti	2004	Veikkausliiga	22	1	–		–		–		22	1
Lahti	2005	Veikkausliiga	23	0	–		–		–		23	0
Lahti	2006	Veikkausliiga	20	1	–		–		–		20	1
Lahti	2007	Veikkausliiga	26	1	–		–		–		26	1
Lahti	Total		112	3	0	0	0	0	0	0	112	3
HJK	2008	Veikkausliiga	21	0	2	0	0	0	0	0	23	0
HJK	2009	Veikkausliiga	25	0	1	0	9	0	2 (Note: Appearances in UEFA Europa League)	0	37	0
HJK	Total		46	0	3	0	9	0	2	0	60	0
Akademisk BK	2009–10	Danish 1st Division	14	1	–		–		–		14	1
HJK	2010	Veikkausliiga	1	0	0	0	0	0	0	0	1	0
Klubi 04	2010	Ykkönen	3	0	–		–		–		3	0
Lahti	2011	Ykkönen	24	2	2	1	–		–		26	3
Lahti	2012	Veikkausliiga	32	2	1	0	6	0	–		39	2
Lahti	2013	Veikkausliiga	32	1	1	0	9	0	–		42	1
Lahti	2014	Veikkausliiga	33	1	5	1	4	0	–		42	2
Lahti	2015	Veikkausliiga	33	0	2	1	5	0	2	0	42	1
Lahti	2016	Veikkausliiga	33	2	4	1	6	1	–		43	4
Lahti	2017	Veikkausliiga	33	0	4	0	–		–		37	0
Lahti	2018	Veikkausliiga	33	1	6	0	–		2	0	41	1
Lahti	2019	Veikkausliiga	28	0	6	0	–		–		34	0
Lahti	Total		281	9	31	4	30	1	4	0	346	14
Career total			457	13	34	4	39	1	6	0	536	18

== Honours ==
HJK

- Veikkausliiga: 2009, 2010
- Finnish Cup: 2008

Lahti

- Finnish League Cup: 2013, 2016
- Ykkönen: 2011
