= Tampereen Peli-Pojat-70 =

Finnish football club

PP-70
- Full name: Tampereen Peli-Pojat -70 ry
- Founded: 11 March 1970; 55 years ago
- Ground: Ikurin Virelä
- Chairman: Jarmo Virta
- Manager: Juho Lätti
- League: Kutonen
- 2025: Kutonen B3, 3rd of 9
- Website: pp-70.fi
Home colours	Away colours

Tampereen Peli-Pojat-70 (abbreviated PP-70) is a football club from Tampere, Finland that was established in 1970. PP-70 currently plays in Kutonen with its home venue at the Ikurin Virelä (Ikuri Sports Field).

== History ==
PP-70 were formed in 1970 following the amalgamation of the football sections of Lielahden Kipinä, Pispalan Tarmo and Lamminpään Korpi. In its early years the club played in the lower divisions of the Finnish football system but in 1985 were promoted for the first time to the Kakkonen which was the third tier at the time. In total the club has enjoyed 4 spells at this level from 1986 to 1988, 1993–1994, 1996–2001 and 2008–2009. In 1994 the club was promoted to Ykkönen and while their first experience at this level lasted only for one season they were again promoted to Ykkönen in 2001. The most successful period of the club then followed with six seasons in the Ykkönen from 2002 until 2007 when they were relegated to Kakkonen. Further relegations followed in 2009 and 2010 and the club are currently in the Nelonen.

=== Divisional Movements ===
Second tier (7 seasons): 1995, 2002–07
Third tier (13 seasons): 1986–88, 1993–94, 1996–2001, 2008–09

=== Season to season ===
Season	Level	Division	Section	Administration	Position	Movements
1990	Tier 4	3. Divisioona (Third Division)	Group 5	Finnish FA (Suomen Pallolitto)	3rd	
1991	Tier 4	3. Divisioona (Third Division)	Group 5	Finnish FA (Suomen Pallolitto)	2nd	
1992	Tier 4	3. Divisioona (Third Division)	Group 5	Finnish FA (Suomen Pallolitto)	1st	Promoted
1993	Tier 3	Kakkonen (Second Division)	West Group	Finnish FA (Suomen Pallolitto)	7th	
1994	Tier 3	Kakkonen (Second Division)	West Group	Finnish FA (Suomen Pallolitto)	1st	Promoted
1995	Tier 2	Ykkönen (First Division)		Finnish FA (Suomen Pallolitto)	14th	Relegated
1996	Tier 3	Kakkonen (Second Division)	West Group	Finnish FA (Suomen Pallolitto)	4th	
1997	Tier 3	Kakkonen (Second Division)	West Group	Finnish FA (Suomen Pallolitto)	5th	
1998	Tier 3	Kakkonen (Second Division)	West Group	Finnish FA (Suomen Pallolitto)	5th	
1999	Tier 3	Kakkonen (Second Division)	South Group	Finnish FA (Suomen Pallolitto)	2nd	Promotion Playoff
2000	Tier 3	Kakkonen (Second Division)	South Group	Finnish FA (Suomen Pallolitto)	6th	
2001	Tier 3	Kakkonen (Second Division)	West Group	Finnish FA (Suomen Pallolitto)	2nd	Promoted
2002	Tier 2	Ykkönen (First Division)	South Group	Finnish FA (Suomen Pallolitto)	4th	Relegation Group – 5th
2003	Tier 2	Ykkönen (First Division)		Finnish FA (Suomen Pallolitto)	10th	
2004	Tier 2	Ykkönen (First Division)		Finnish FA (Suomen Pallolitto)	9th	
2005	Tier 2	Ykkönen (First Division)		Finnish FA (Suomen Pallolitto)	8th	
2006	Tier 2	Ykkönen (First Division)		Finnish FA (Suomen Pallolitto)	12th	
2007	Tier 2	Ykkönen (First Division)		Finnish FA (Suomen Pallolitto)	13th	Relegated
2008	Tier 3	Kakkonen (Second Division)	Group B	Finnish FA (Suomen Pallolitto)	4th	
2009	Tier 3	Kakkonen (Second Division)	Group B	Finnish FA (Suomen Pallolitto)	12th	Relegated
2010	Tier 4	Kolmonen (Third Division)		Tampere District (SPL Tampere)	14th	Relegated
2011	Tier 5	Nelonen (Fourth Division)		Tampere District (SPL Tampere)	6th	
2012	Tier 5	Nelonen (Fourth Division)		Tampere District (SPL Tampere)	3rd	
2013	Tier 5	Nelonen (Fourth Division)		Tampere District (SPL Tampere)	3rd	
2014	Tier 5	Nelonen (Fourth Division)		Tampere District (SPL Tampere)	6th	
2015	Tier 5	Nelonen (Fourth Division)		Tampere District (SPL Tampere)	3rd	
2016	Tier 5	Nelonen (Fourth Division)		Tampere District (SPL Tampere)	4th	
2017	Tier 5	Nelonen (Fourth Division)		Tampere District (SPL Tampere)	5th	
2018	Tier 5	Nelonen (Fourth Division)		Tampere District (SPL Tampere)	2nd	Promoted
2019	Tier 4	Kolmonen (Third Division)	Group A	Tampere District (SPL Tampere)	12th	Relegated
2020	Tier 5	Nelonen (Fourth Division)	Group B	Western District (SPL Läntinen)	1st	Promoted
2021	Tier 4	Kolmonen (Third Division)	Group B	Western District (SPL Läntinen)	8th	
2022	Tier 4	Kolmonen (Third Division)	Group B	Western District (SPL Läntinen)	8th	
2023	Tier 4	Kolmonen (Third Division)	Group B	Western District (SPL Läntinen)	3rd	
2024	Tier 5	Kolmonen (Third Division)	Group B	Western District (SPL Läntinen)	10th	Relegated
2025	Tier 8	Kutonen (Sixth Division)	Group B3	Western District (SPL Läntinen)		First team withdrew from Nelonen, second team continues as first team

- 7 seasons in Ykkönen
- 10 seasons in Kakkonen
- 8 seasons in Kolmonen

== References and sources ==
- Official Website
- Suomen Cup
