= 2017 IFK Mariehamn season =

IFK Mariehamn
2017 season
- Chairman: Robert Söderdahl
- Manager: Peter Lundberg
- Stadium: Wiklöf Holding Arena
- Veikkausliiga: 5th
- Finnish Cup: Quarterfinal vs HJK
- UEFA Champions League: Second qualifying round vs Legia Warsaw
- Top goalscorer: League: Aleksei Kangaskolkka (16); All: Aleksei Kangaskolkka (19)
Home colours	Away colours

The 2017 season is IFK Mariehamn's 13th Veikkausliiga season since their promotion back to the top flight in 2005. They are the defending Veikkausliiga champions.

== Squad ==
As of 10 August 2017

Note: Flags indicate national team as defined under FIFA eligibility rules; some limited exceptions apply. Players may hold more than one non-FIFA nationality.

No.	Pos.	Nation	Player
1	GK	EST	Andreas Vaikla
2	DF	FIN	Albin Granlund
3	DF	FIN	Kristian Kojola
4	DF	SWE	Philip Sparrdal Mantilla
5	MF	FIN	Rezgar Amani
6	DF	FIN	Petter Hemming
7	DF	FIN	Tommy Wirtanen
8	DF	FIN	Jani Lyyski (captain)
9	MF	USA	Brian Span
11	MF	SWE	Robbin Sellin
14	MF	SWE	Gabriel Petrović
15	MF	KEN	Amos Ekhalie

No.	Pos.	Nation	Player
16	DF	FIN	Aapo Mäenpää
17	MF	FIN	Robin Sid
18	MF	FIN	Joel Karlström
20	MF	KEN	Anthony Dafaa
24	GK	FIN	Johan Sundman
26	MF	FIN	Joel Mattsson
30	GK	FIN	Marc Nordqvist
33	FW	FIN	Aleksei Kangaskolkka
55	DF	SWE	Bobbie Friberg da Cruz
88	MF	CZE	Filip Hlúpik
92	GK	SCO	Craig Wight

== Transfers ==
=== Winter ===
In: Note: Flags indicate national team as defined under FIFA eligibility rules; some limited exceptions apply. Players may hold more than one non-FIFA nationality.

No.	Pos.	Nation	Player
1	GK	EST	Andreas Vaikla (from (Sweden) IFK Norrköping)
5	MF	FIN	Rezgar Amani (from (Finland) Åland)
6	DF	FIN	Petter Hemming (from (Finland) Åland)
11	MF	SWE	Robbin Sellin (from (Sweden) GIF Sundsvall)
77	FW	ZIM	Lucky Mkosana (from (United States) New York Cosmos)

Out: Note: Flags indicate national team as defined under FIFA eligibility rules; some limited exceptions apply. Players may hold more than one non-FIFA nationality.

No.	Pos.	Nation	Player
1	GK	FIN	Walter Viitala (to (Denmark) Viborg)
5	FW	JAM	Dever Orgill (to (Austria) Wolfsberger AC)
11	FW	SWE	Josef Ibrahim (to (Sweden) Syrianska)
18	MF	FIN	Thomas Mäkinen (to (Italy) Renate)
25	MF	BRA	Diego Assis (to (Thailand) Thai Honda Ladkrabang)

=== Summer ===
In: Note: Flags indicate national team as defined under FIFA eligibility rules; some limited exceptions apply. Players may hold more than one non-FIFA nationality.

No.	Pos.	Nation	Player
88	MF	CZE	Filip Hlúpik (from (Bulgaria) Cherno More Varna)

Out: Note: Flags indicate national team as defined under FIFA eligibility rules; some limited exceptions apply. Players may hold more than one non-FIFA nationality.

No.	Pos.	Nation	Player
77	FW	ZIM	Lucky Mkosana (to (United States) New York Cosmos)

== Competitions ==
=== Veikkausliiga ===
==== League table ====
Pos	Team	Pld	W	D	L	GF	GA	GD	Pts	Qualification or relegation
3	Ilves	33	15	11	7	39	35	+4	56	Qualification for the Europa League first qualifying round (Note: Since HJK, winners of the 2016–17 Finnish Cup, qualified for the Champions League first qualifying round, the spot awarded to the cup winner (Europa League first qualifying round) is passed to the next best-placed team (in this case to the fourth-placed team).)
4	Lahti	33	12	13	8	46	31	+15	49	Qualification for the Europa League first qualifying round
5	IFK Mariehamn	33	13	10	10	44	42	+2	49	
6	SJK	33	13	8	12	42	47	−5	47	
7	RoPS	33	12	6	15	43	51	−8	42	

Updated to match(es) played on 28 October 2017. Source: Veikkausliiga (in Finnish), Soccerway
Rules for classification: 1) Points; 2) Goal difference; 3) Goals scored; 4) Head-to-head points; 5) Head-to-head goal difference; 6) Head-to-head away goals scored; 7) Play-off
(Note: Play-off is only played if need to decide champion, teams for relegation or UEFA competition and will be played on a neutral ground).

==== Results summary ====
Overall								Home						Away					
Pld	W	D	L	GF	GA	GD	Pts	W	D	L	GF	GA	GD	W	D	L	GF	GA	GD
33	13	10	10	44	42	+2	49	10	5	2	32	17	+15	3	5	8	12	25	−13

Last updated: 28 October 2017.
Source: See Results

==== Results by matchday ====
Matchday	1	2	3	4	5	6	7	8	9	10	11	12	13	14	15	16	17	18	19	20	21	22	23	24	25	26	27	28	29	30	31	32	33
Ground	H	H	A	H	A	H	A	H	A	H	A	A	H	A	H	A	H	H	A	H	A	H	A	H	A	H	H	A	H	A	A	A	H
Result	W	D	D	D	L	W	D	L	D	W	W	L	W	L	W	D	D	D	L	D	L	W	L	W	D	W	W	L	W	W	L	W	L

Updated to match(es) played on 28 October 2017. Source: See results
A = Away; H = Home; W = Win; D = Draw; L = Loss

==== Results ====
8 April 2017 1	IFK Mariehamn	5 – 2	JJK	Mariehamn
16:00 EEST (UTC+3)	Mantilla (yellow card) 31'; Span 45+1'; Kangaskolkka 52'; Sellin 62'; Kojola 70'; Mkosana 90'	Report	T.Tahvanainen 6'; Petrescu 9'	Stadium: Wiklöf Holding Arena; Attendance: 1,103; Referee: Antti Munukka

15 April 2017 2	IFK Mariehamn	1 – 1	HJK	Mariehamn
16:00 EEST (UTC+3)	Kojola (yellow card) 11'; Sellin (yellow card) 14'; Petrović (yellow card) 43'; Span 74'	Report	Obilor 31' (yellow card) 41'; Yaghoubi (yellow card) 80'	Stadium: Wiklöf Holding Arena; Attendance: 1,360; Referee: Marko Grönholm

21 April 2017 3	Inter Turku	1 – 1	IFK Mariehamn	Turku
18:00 EEST (UTC+3)	Kuqi 24'	Report	Kangaskolkka 2'; Mantilla (yellow card) 90'	Stadium: Veritas Stadion; Attendance: 3,072; Referee: Jari Järvinen

30 April 2017 4	IFK Mariehamn	1 – 1	VPS	Mariehamn
16:00 EEST (UTC+3)	Kojola 41'; Petrović (yellow card) 48'; Span (yellow card) 73'; J.Mattsson (yellow card) 77'	Report	Strandvall 49'	Stadium: Wiklöf Holding Arena; Attendance: 1,013; Referee: Petri Viljanen

6 May 2017 5	Ilves	3 – 0	IFK Mariehamn	Tampere
17:00 EEST (UTC+3)	Miettunen 3'; Rahimi 50'; Ngueukam (yellow card) 79' (goal) 85'	Report		Stadium: Tammelan Stadion; Attendance: 3,062; Referee: Ville Nevalainen

12 May 2017 6	IFK Mariehamn	3 – 0	PS Kemi	Mariehamn
18:30 EEST (UTC+3)	Petrović (yellow card) 22'; Mkosana 78'; Kangaskolkka 84', 88'	Report	Salazar (yellow card) 17'	Stadium: Wiklöf Holding Arena; Attendance: 1,007; Referee: Toni Pohjoismäki

19 May 2017 7	HIFK	1 – 1	IFK Mariehamn	Helsinki
18:30 EEST (UTC+3)	Hänninen 30' (yellow card) 72'	Report	Kangaskolkka 17' (yellow card) 89'; Mantilla (yellow card) 41' da Cruz (yellow card) 87'	Stadium: Telia 5G -areena Attendance: 2,351; Referee: Mikko Mörö

23 May 2017 8	IFK Mariehamn	0 – 2	Lahti	Mariehamn
18:30 EEST (UTC+3)	Sellin (yellow card) 88'	Report	Nazimov 60'; Simonovski 85'	Stadium: Wiklöf Holding Arena; Attendance: 1,212; Referee: Petri Viljanen

27 May 2017 9	SJK	1 – 1	IFK Mariehamn	Seinäjoki
18:00 EEST (UTC+3)	Hetemaj 52'; Guichón (yellow card) 67'	Report	Kangaskolkka 17' (yellow card) 67'	Stadium: OmaSP Stadion; Attendance: 2,978; Referee: Oskari Hämäläinen

31 May 2017 10	IFK Mariehamn	2 – 1	RoPS	Mariehamn
18:30 EEST (UTC+3)	Ekhalie 10' (yellow card) 67'; Lyyski 64'	Report	A.Nurmela (yellow card) 54'; Taylor 58'	Stadium: Wiklöf Holding Arena; Attendance: 1,011; Referee: Dennis Antamo

4 June 2017 11	KuPS	1 – 2	IFK Mariehamn	Kuopio
18:30 EEST (UTC+3)	Gabriel 39'; S.Savolainen (yellow card) 63'; Salami (red card) 90+7'; Duah (red card)	Report	Span 8' da Cruz (yellow card) 27'; Sellin 35' (yellow card) 41'; Lyyski (yellow card) 38'; Kangaskolkka (yellow card) 78'; Vaikla (yellow card) 87'	Stadium: Kuopio Football Stadium; Attendance: 2,358; Referee: Jani Laaksonen

14 June 2017 12	PS Kemi	3 – 0	IFK Mariehamn	Kemi
18:30 EEST (UTC+3)	Valenčič 20'; Mansally 64'; A.Gullsten 71'	Report	Petrović (yellow card) 23'	Stadium: Sauvosaaren Urheilupuisto; Attendance: 1,217; Referee: Petri Viljanen

18 June 2017 13	IFK Mariehamn	2 – 1	JJK	Mariehamn
18:30 EEST (UTC+3)	Sellin 4'; Kangaskolkka 20'	Report	S.Suoraniemi 30'; Etock (yellow card) 88'	Stadium: Wiklöf Holding Arena; Attendance: 2,207; Referee: Jari Järvinen

22 June 2017 14	HJK	2 – 0	IFK Mariehamn	Helsinki
18:30 EEST (UTC+3)	Annan (yellow card) 17'; Savage 24'; Pelvas 66' (yellow card) 86'	Report	Friberg (yellow card) 52'	Stadium: Telia 5G -areena Attendance: 3,007; Referee: Mattias Gestranius

27 June 2017 15	IFK Mariehamn	5 – 0	Inter Turku	Mariehamn
18:30 EEST (UTC+3)	Kangaskolkka 4', 26' (pen.) (yellow card) 78'; Span 9' (yellow card) 65'; Sellin 60'; Amani 83'	Report	García (yellow card) 86'	Stadium: Wiklöf Holding Arena; Attendance: 1,302; Referee: Antti Munukka

2 July 2017 16	VPS	0 – 0	IFK Mariehamn	Vaasa
18:30 EEST (UTC+3)	Clennon (yellow card) 78'	Report	A.Mäenpää (yellow card) 38'	Stadium: Hietalahti Stadium; Attendance: 2,134; Referee: Kalle Mäkinen

7 July 2017 17	IFK Mariehamn	2 – 2	Ilves	Mariehamn
18:30 EEST (UTC+3)	E.Tamminen 58'; Ngueukam 80'	Report	Dafaa 71'; Sid 87'	Stadium: Wiklöf Holding Arena; Attendance: 1,544; Referee: Ville Nevalainen

22 July 2017 18	IFK Mariehamn	1 – 1	HIFK	Mariehamn
16:00 EEST (UTC+3)	Kangaskolkka (yellow card) 48' (goal) 60'	Report	Halme 45+2'; Hänninen (yellow card) 56'; Mäkelä (yellow card) 90+2'	Stadium: Wiklöf Holding Arena; Attendance: 1,809; Referee: Toni Pohjoismäki

29 July 2017 19	Lahti	6 – 2	IFK Mariehamn	Lahti
17:00 EEST (UTC+3)	Kuningas (yellow card) 15' (goal) 90'; Hostikka 31'; Anier 34', 39'; Simonovski 44'; Stênio 88'	Report	Sid 22'; Span (yellow card) 61' (yellow-red card) 84'; Sellin 67'	Stadium: Lahti Stadium; Attendance: 2,778; Referee: Kalle Mäkinen

6 August 2017 20	IFK Mariehamn	0 – 0	SJK	Mariehamn
15:00 EEST (UTC+3)	Sid (yellow card) 53'; Petrović (yellow card) 67'	Report	Bardanca (yellow card) 44'; Sundman (yellow card) 67'	Stadium: Wiklöf Holding Arena; Attendance: 1,012; Referee: Jani Laaksonen

10 August 2017 21	RoPS	3 – 0	IFK Mariehamn	Rovaniemi
18:30 EEST (UTC+3)	Trafford 11'; Tatomirović (yellow card) 45+1'; S.Roiha 48'; Eze 79'	Report	A.Mäenpää (yellow card) 40'; Span (yellow card) 88'	Stadium: Rovaniemen keskuskenttä Attendance: 1,422; Referee: Oskari Hämäläinen

14 August 2017 22	IFK Mariehamn	2 – 1	KuPS	Mariehamn
18:30 EEST (UTC+3)	Sid 29'; Kangaskolkka (yellow card) 41'; Ekhalie 62'; Kojola (yellow card) 81'	Report	Boxall (yellow card) 22'; Pennanen (yellow card) 40'; Salami (yellow card) 72'; Purje 90+4'	Stadium: Wiklöf Holding Arena; Attendance: 1,607; Referee: Mikko Mörö

20 August 2017 23	KuPS	2 – 1	IFK Mariehamn	Kuopio
18:30 EEST (UTC+3)	Pennanen (yellow card) 20'; Salami 68'; Saxman 90'	Report	Petrović (yellow card) 57'; Kangaskolkka 58'; Sellin (yellow card) 77'	Stadium: Kuopio Football Stadium; Attendance: 2,981; Referee: Dennis Antamo

27 August 2017 24	IFK Mariehamn	1 – 0	VPS	Mariehamn
18:30 EEST (UTC+3)	Kangaskolkka 49'; Sellin (yellow card) 90+2'	Report	Koskimaa (yellow card) 53' (yellow-red card) 87'; Sohna (yellow card) 73'	Stadium: Wiklöf Holding Arena; Attendance: 1,102; Referee: Antti Munukka

8 September 2017 25	HIFK	0 – 0	IFK Mariehamn	Helsinki
18:30 EEST (UTC+3)	Ristola (yellow card) 18'; Mäkelä (yellow card) 76'; Väyrynen (yellow card) 82'	Report	Petrović (yellow card) 44'	Stadium: Telia 5G -areena Attendance: 2,317; Referee: Petri Viljanen

12 September 2017 27	IFK Mariehamn	2 – 1	Inter Turku	Mariehamn
18:30 EEST (UTC+3)	Kangaskolkka 37', 55'	Report	Källman 59'	Stadium: Wiklöf Holding Arena; Attendance: 1,207; Referee: Mikko Mörö

17 September 2017 27	IFK Mariehamn	3 – 2	PS Kemi	Mariehamn
18:30 EEST (UTC+3)	Kojola 10'; J.Mattsson 45'; Petrović 63'	Report	R.Karjalainen 36'; Tano 82'	Stadium: Wiklöf Holding Arena; Attendance: 1,252; Referee: Marko Grönholm

27 September 2017 28	HJK	1 – 0	IFK Mariehamn	Helsinki
18:30 EEST (UTC+3)	Obilor (yellow card) 11'; Annan 59'	Report	Mantilla (yellow card) 54'	Stadium: Telia 5G -areena Attendance: 3,217; Referee: Dennis Antamo

1 October 2017 29	IFK Mariehamn	2 – 1	SJK	Mariehamn
18:30 EEST (UTC+3)	Kojola (yellow card) 45'; Kangaskolkka 60' (pen.); Sid 78'; M. Nordqvist (yellow card) 90+1'	Report	J.Sundman (yellow card) 16'; Hetemaj (yellow card) 69'; Zeneli (yellow card) 80'; Hambo 89'	Stadium: Wiklöf Holding Arena; Attendance: 1,274; Referee: Petri Viljanen

12 October 2017 30	Lahti	0 – 1	IFK Mariehamn	Lahti
18:30 EEST (UTC+3)	Helmke (yellow card) 29'; Stênio (yellow card) 35'; Anier (yellow card) 89'; Sadat (yellow card) 90'	Report	Hlúpik (yellow card) 33'; Sid 70'; Mantilla (yellow card) 88'; Kojola (yellow card) 89'	Stadium: Lahti Stadium; Attendance: 2,020; Referee: Petri Viljanen

16 October 2017 31	JJK	1 – 0	IFK Mariehamn	Mariehamn
18:30 EEST (UTC+3)	Etock 29'	Report	Wirtanen (yellow card) 63'	Stadium: Wiklöf Holding Arena; Attendance: 887; Referee: Petri Viljanen

20 October 2017 32	RoPS	0 – 3	IFK Mariehamn	Rovaniemi
18:30 EEST (UTC+3)	Stavitski (yellow card) 42'	Report	Sid 1' (yellow card) 53'; Kangaskolkka 72'; Span 90+1'	Stadium: Rovaniemen keskuskenttä Attendance: 1,385; Referee: Joni Hyytiä

28 October 2017 33	IFK Mariehamn	0 – 1	Ilves	Mariehamn
14:00 EEST (UTC+3)	J.Mattsson (yellow card) 79'; Kangaskolkka (yellow card) 88'; Friberg da Cruz (yellow card) 90+4'	Report	Noubissi (yellow card) 26'; Ala-Myllymäki 45' (yellow card) 73'	Stadium: Wiklöf Holding Arena; Attendance: 1,680; Referee: Mattias Gestranius

=== Finnish Cup ===
==== Sixth Round ====
Team	Pld	W	D	L	GF	GA	GD	Pts
IFK Mariehamn	5	4	1	0	11	1	+10	13
FC Inter Turku	5	3	1	1	13	3	+10	10
Ekenäs IF	5	3	0	2	6	7	−1	9
TPS	5	1	2	2	9	8	+1	5
FC Legirus Inter	5	1	1	3	5	10	−5	4
P-Iirot	5	0	1	4	4	19	−15	1

29 January 2017 1	IFK Mariehamn	4 – 0	Legirus Inter	Eckerö
18:00 EET (UTC+2)	Sid 13' (yellow card) 74'; Mkosana 34', 66'; Petrović (yellow card) 44'; Lyyski (yellow card) 63'; J.Karlström 77'	Report	Z.Kibona (yellow card) 33'	Stadium: Eckeröhallen; Attendance: 376; Referee: Joni Hyytiä

3 February 2017 2	TPS	1 – 1	IFK Mariehamn	Turku
17:00 EET (UTC+2)	Ääritalo 42'; O.Jakonen (yellow card) 58'	Report	Sellin 53' (yellow card) 65'	Stadium: Kupittaa 5 KHT; Attendance: 549; Referee: Dennis Antamo

11 February 2017 3	IFK Mariehamn	4 – 0	P-Iirot	Eckerö
19:00 EET (UTC+2)	Lyyski 8'; Kangaskolkka 45'; Span 60'; Sellin 84'	Report		Stadium: Eckeröhallen; Attendance: 292; Referee: Jesse Salo

18 February 2017 4	Ekenäs IF	0 – 1	IFK Mariehamn	Raseborg
16:00 EET (UTC+2)	P.Akouokou (yellow card) 43'	Report	Sellin (yellow card) 52'; Kangaskolkka 87' (pen.); J.Mattsson (yellow card) 89'	Stadium: Keskuskenttä TN; Attendance: 283; Referee: Dennis Antamo

1 March 2017 5	IFK Mariehamn	1 – 0	Inter Turku	Eckerö
19:00 EET (UTC+2)	Kangaskolkka 46' (yellow card) 87'; Span (yellow card) 76'; Sellin (yellow card) 90'	Report		Stadium: Eckeröhallen; Attendance: 430; Referee: Dennis Antamo

==== Knockout stage ====
19 March 2017 Quarterfinal	IFK Mariehamn	0 – 3	HJK	Mariehamn
17:00 EET (UTC+2)		Report	Yaghoubi 17'; Vaikla 28' (o.g.); Pelvas 42'	Stadium: Eckeröhallen; Attendance: 580; Referee: Marko Grönholm

=== UEFA Champions League ===
==== Qualifying rounds ====
12 July 2017 Second qualifying round 1st leg	IFK Mariehamn (Finland)	0 – 3	(Poland) Legia Warsaw	Mariehamn, Finland
21:00 CEST (UTC+2)	Dafaa (yellow card) 56' (yellow-red card) 61'; Sid (yellow card) 88'	Report	Guilherme 8' (pen.); Nagy 40'; Hämäläinen 44'; Dąbrowski (yellow card) 54'	Stadium: Wiklöf Holding Arena; Attendance: 1,637; Referee: Andrew Dallas (Scotland)

19 July 2017 Second qualifying round 2nd leg	Legia Warsaw (Poland)	6 – 0 (9 – 0 agg.)	(Finland) IFK Mariehamn	Warsaw, Poland
21:45 CEST (UTC+2)	Guilherme 6'; Kojola 37' (o.g.); Kucharczyk 40', 54' (pen.); Szymański 80'; Michalak 81'	Report		Stadium: Polish Army Stadium; Referee: Tiago Martins (Portugal)

== Squad statistics ==
As of Match played 28 October 2017

=== Appearances and goals ===
No.	Pos	Nat	Player	Total		Veikkausliiga		Finnish Cup		Champions League	
No.	Pos	Nat	Player	Apps	Goals	Apps	Goals	Apps	Goals	Apps	Goals
1	GK	(Estonia) EST	Andreas Vaikla	31	0	26	0	4	0	1	0
2	DF	(Finland) FIN	Albin Granlund	24	0	19+1	0	2	0	0+2	0
3	DF	(Finland) FIN	Kristian Kojola	41	3	33	3	5+1	0	2	0
4	DF	(Sweden) SWE	Philip Sparrdal Mantilla	28	0	26+1	0	1	0	0	0
5	MF	(Finland) FIN	Rezgar Amani	16	1	2+9	1	0+4	0	0+1	0
6	DF	(Finland) FIN	Petter Hemming	2	0	0+1	0	1	0	0	0
7	MF	(Finland) FIN	Tommy Wirtanen	17	0	6+7	0	1+2	0	0+1	0
8	DF	(Finland) FIN	Jani Lyyski	25	2	15+3	1	5	1	2	0
9	MF	(United States) USA	Brian Span	40	6	31+1	5	5+1	1	2	0
10	FW	(Finland) FIN	Tobias Eriksson	1	0	0	0	0+1	0	0	0
11	MF	(Sweden) SWE	Robbin Sellin	30	7	23	5	5	2	2	0
14	MF	(Sweden) SWE	Gabriel Petrović	37	1	31	1	4	0	2	0
15	MF	(Kenya) KEN	Amos Ekhalie	37	2	25+4	2	6	0	2	0
16	DF	(Finland) FIN	Aapo Mäenpää	25	0	15+4	0	3+1	0	2	0
17	MF	(Finland) FIN	Robin Sid	33	7	16+11	6	3+1	1	1+1	0
18	MF	(Finland) FIN	Joel Karlström	3	1	0+1	0	0+2	1	0	0
20	MF	(Kenya) KEN	Anthony Dafaa	20	1	10+7	1	0+2	0	1	0
26	MF	(Finland) FIN	Joel Mattsson	25	1	11+9	1	2+2	0	0+1	0
30	GK	(Finland) FIN	Marc Nordqvist	10	0	7	0	2	0	1	0
33	FW	(Finland) FIN	Aleksei Kangaskolkka	39	19	31	16	6	3	2	0
55	DF	(Sweden) SWE	Bobbie Friberg da Cruz	41	0	32+1	0	6	0	2	0
88	MF	(Czech Republic) CZE	Filip Hlúpik	9	0	2+7	0	0	0	0	0
Trialists:
Players who left IFK Mariehamn during the season:
77	FW	(Zimbabwe) ZIM	Lucky Mkosana	15	4	2+7	2	5+1	2	0	0

=== Goal scorers ===
Place	Position	Nation	Number	Name	Veikkausliiga	Finnish Cup	Champions League	Total
1	FW	(Finland)	33	Aleksei Kangaskolkka	16	3	0	19
2	MF	(Sweden)	11	Robbin Sellin	5	2	0	7
3	MF	(Finland)	17	Robin Sid	6	1	0	7
4	MF	(United States)	9	Brian Span	5	1	0	6
5	FW	(Zimbabwe)	77	Lucky Mkosana	2	2	0	4
6	DF	(Finland)	3	Kristian Kojola	3	0	0	3
7	MF	(Kenya)	15	Amos Ekhalie	2	0	0	2
7	DF	(Finland)	8	Jani Lyyski	1	1	0	2
9	MF	(Finland)	5	Rezgar Amani	1	0	0	1
9	MF	(Kenya)	20	Anthony Dafaa	1	0	0	1
9	MF	(Sweden)	14	Gabriel Petrović	1	0	0	1
9	MF	(Finland)	26	Joel Mattsson	1	0	0	1
9	MF	(Finland)	18	Joel Karlström	0	1	0	1
TOTALS					44	11	0	55

=== Disciplinary record ===
Number	Nation	Position	Name	Veikkausliiga		Finnish Cup		Champions League		Total	
Number	Nation	Position	Name	Yellow card	Red card	Yellow card	Red card	Yellow card	Red card	Yellow card	Red card
1	(Estonia)	GK	Andreas Vaikla	1	0	0	0	0	0	1	0
3	(Finland)	DF	Kristian Kojola	4	0	0	0	0	0	4	0
4	(Sweden)	DF	Philip Sparrdal Mantilla	5	0	0	0	0	0	5	0
7	(Finland)	MF	Tommy Wirtanen	1	0	0	0	0	0	1	0
8	(Finland)	DF	Jani Lyyski	1	0	1	0	0	0	2	0
9	(United States)	MF	Brian Span	5	1	1	0	0	0	6	1
11	(Sweden)	MF	Robbin Sellin	5	0	3	0	0	0	8	0
14	(Sweden)	MF	Gabriel Petrović	7	0	1	0	0	0	8	0
15	(Kenya)	MF	Amos Ekhalie	1	0	0	0	0	0	1	0
16	(Finland)	MF	Aapo Mäenpää	2	0	0	0	0	0	2	0
17	(Finland)	MF	Robin Sid	2	0	1	0	1	0	4	0
20	(Kenya)	MF	Anthony Dafaa	0	0	0	0	2	1	2	1
26	(Finland)	MF	Joel Mattsson	2	0	1	0	0	0	3	0
30	(Finland)	GK	Marc Nordqvist	1	0	0	0	0	0	1	0
33	(Finland)	FW	Aleksei Kangaskolkka	6	0	1	0	0	0	7	0
55	(Sweden)	DF	Bobbie Friberg da Cruz	4	0	0	0	0	0	4	0
88	(Czech Republic)	MF	Filip Hlúpik	1	0	0	0	0	0	1	0
TOTALS				48	1	9	0	3	1	60	2
