= Rezgar Amani =

Iranian-Finnish footballer (born 1992)

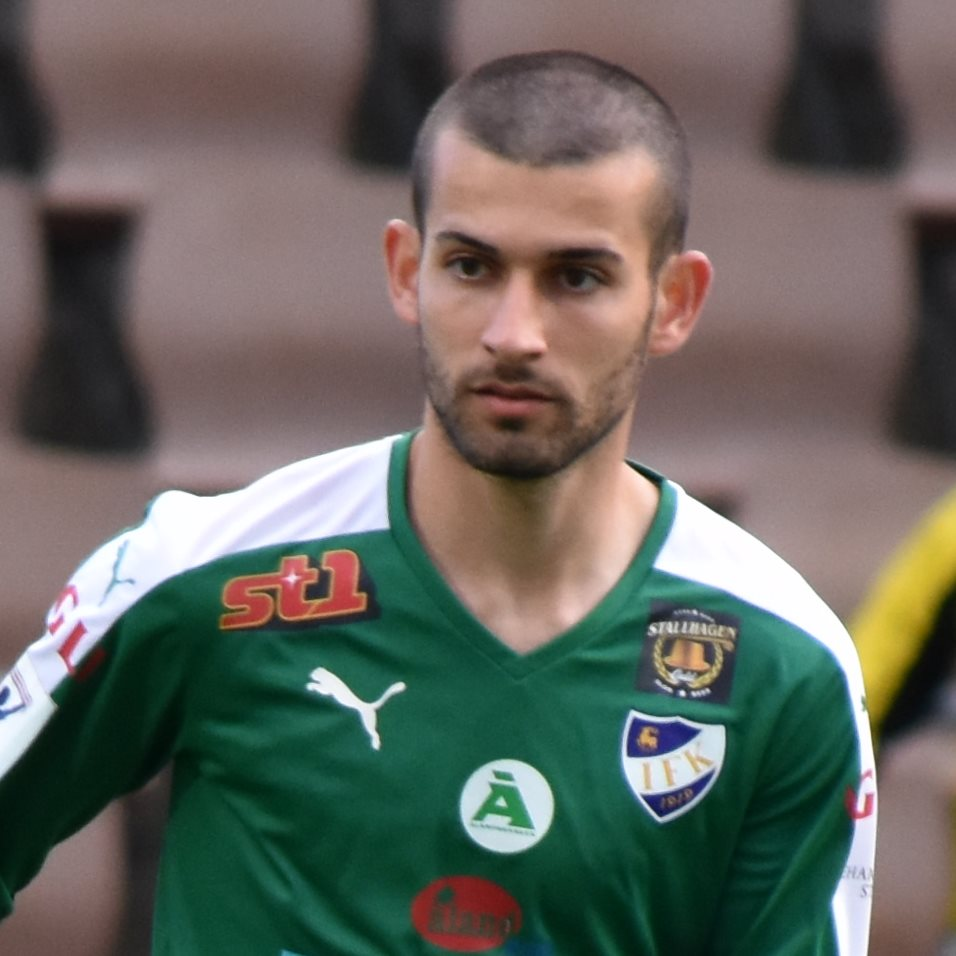

Personal information
- Full name: Rezgar Amani
- Date of birth: 1 June 1992 (age 34)
- Place of birth: Tehran, Iran
- Height: 1.76 m (5 ft 9 in)
- Position: Striker

Team information
- Current team: Åland
- Number: 10

Youth career
- 2004–2011: Mariehamn

Senior career*
Years	Team	Apps	(Gls)
2011–2015	Mariehamn	42	(0)
2013	→ EIF (loan)	1	(0)
2015–2016	Åland	17	(9)
2017–2018	Mariehamn	11	(1)
2017	→ Åland (loan)	10	(15)
2018–	Åland	85	(49)
- * Club domestic league appearances and goals as of 9 July 2022

Rezgar Amani (Persian: رزگار امانی; born June 1, 1992) is an Iranian-Finnish footballer who plays for Åland in the Kolmonen.

== Career statistics ==
As of 9 July 2022

Club	Division	Season	League		Cup		Continental		Other		Total	
Club	Division	Season	Apps	Goals	Apps	Goals	Apps	Goals	Apps	Goals	Apps	Goals
Mariehamn	Veikkausliiga	2011	3	0	0	0	—		2	1	5	1
Mariehamn	Veikkausliiga	2012	16	0	4	0	—		5	0	25	0
Mariehamn	Veikkausliiga	2013	22	0	3	0	—		5	0	30	0
Mariehamn	Veikkausliiga	2014	1	0	1	0	1	0	4	0	7	0
Mariehamn	Veikkausliiga	2015	0	0	0	0	—		—		0	0
Mariehamn	Total		42	0	8	0	1	0	16	1	67	1
EIF (loan)	Kakkonen	2013	1	0	0	0	—		—		1	0
Åland	Kakkonen	2016	17	9	1	1	—		—		18	10
Mariehamn	Veikkausliiga	2017	11	1	4	0	1	0	—		16	1
Åland (loan)	Kolmonen	2017	10	15	0	0	—		—		10	15
Åland	Kolmonen	2018	25	12	0	0	—		—		25	12
Åland	Kolmonen	2019	25	21	0	0	—		2	1	27	22
Åland	Kolmonen	2020	12	10	0	0	—		—		12	10
Åland	Kolmonen	2021	14	5	0	0	—		3	0	17	5
Åland	Kolmonen	2022	9	1	4	1	—		—		13	2
Åland	Total		95	64	4	1	0	0	5	1	104	66
Career total			166	74	17	2	2	0	21	2	206	78
