= Marc Nordqvist =

Finnish footballer (born 1997)

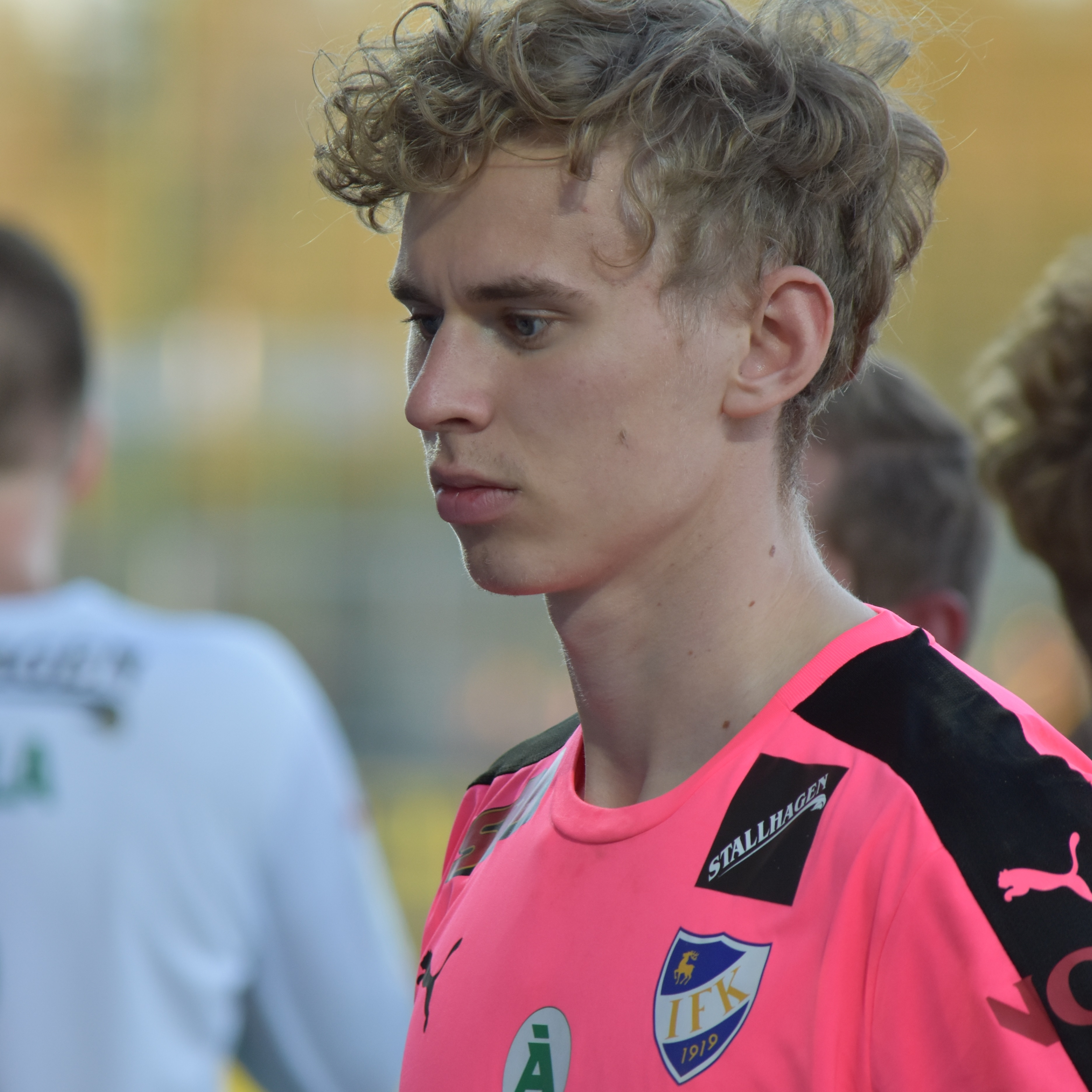

Personal information
- Date of birth: 1 June 1997 (age 29)
- Place of birth: Mariehamn, Åland
- Height: 1.90 m (6 ft 3 in)
- Position: Goalkeeper

Youth career
- –2014: IFK Mariehamn

Senior career*
Years	Team	Apps	(Gls)
2014–2021	IFK Mariehamn	21	(0)
2016	→ FC Åland (loan)	18	(0)
2018	→ FK Jerv (loan)	0	(0)
2023–	IFK Mariehamn	5	(0)

International career^{‡}
2017	Finland U21	2	(0)
2015	Åland	4	(0)
- * Club domestic league appearances and goals as of 31 October 2021 ‡ National team caps and goals as of 11:55, 13 May 2020 (UTC)

Marc Nordqvist (born 1 June 1997) is a Finnish footballer who plays as a goalkeeper.

== Club career ==
Nordqvist spent time on trial with then-Championship side Watford in 2015.

In the summer of 2018 he went on a half-season loan to FK Jerv of the Norwegian second tier.

== Career statistics ==
=== Club ===
As of match played 13 May 2020.

Club	Season	League			National Cup		League Cup		Other		Total	
Club	Season	Division	Apps	Goals	Apps	Goals	Apps	Goals	Apps	Goals	Apps	Goals
IFK Mariehamn	2014	Veikkausliiga	1	0	0	0	2 (Note: Appearances in the Finnish League Cup)	0	0	0	3	0
IFK Mariehamn	2015	Veikkausliiga	0	0	0	0	0	0	0	0	0	0
IFK Mariehamn	2016	Veikkausliiga	0	0	0	0	2	0	0	0	2	0
IFK Mariehamn	2017	Veikkausliiga	7	0	2 (Note: Appearances in the Finnish Cup)	0	–		1 (Note: Appearances in UEFA Champions League qualifying)	0	10	0
IFK Mariehamn	2018	Veikkausliiga	11	0	3	0	–		0	0	14	0
IFK Mariehamn	2019	Veikkausliiga	0	0	0	0	–		0	0	0	0
IFK Mariehamn	2020	Veikkausliiga	0	0	1	0	–		0	0	1	0
IFK Mariehamn	Total		19	0	6	0	4	0	1	0	30	0
FC Åland (loan)	2016	Kakkonen	18	0	0	0	0	0	0	0	18	0
FK Jerv (loan)	2018	1. divisjon	0	0	0	0	–		0	0	0	0
Career total			27	0	3	0	4	0	1	0	35	0

=== International ===
As of matches played 1 November 2017.

National team	Year	Apps	Goals
Åland	2015	4	0
Total		4	0
