= Stênio =

Stênio may refer to:

- Stênio Garcia, Brazilian actor
- Stênio (footballer, born 1994) (Stênio Garcia Dutra), Brazilian football player
- Stênio Júnior, Brazilian football player
- Stênio Yamamoto, Brazilian sport shooter
- Stênio (footballer, born 2003) (Stênio Zanetti Toledo), Brazilian footballer
