= Fredrik Appel (footballer) =

Finnish footballer (born 1991)

Personal information
- Date of birth: 8 April 1991 (age 35)
- Position: Defender

Team information
- Current team: FC Aland

Senior career*
Years	Team	Apps	(Gls)
2015–	FC Aland		
- * Club domestic league appearances and goals

Fredrik Appel (born 8 April 1991) is a Finnish footballer who currently plays for FC Aland as a defender.
