= Albin Granlund =

Finnish footballer (born 1989)

Personal information
- Full name: Eddie Albin Alexander Granlund
- Date of birth: 1 September 1989 (age 37)
- Place of birth: Pargas, Finland
- Height: 1.79 m (5 ft 10 in)
- Position: Right-back

Team information
- Current team: Inter Turku
- Number: 5

Youth career
- 2000–2005: Pargas IF

Senior career*
Years	Team	Apps	(Gls)
2006–2008	Pargas IF	35	(4)
2006	Pargas IF 2	16	(3)
2008–2009	Åbo IFK	44	(2)
2010–2014	RoPS	98	(5)
2014–2017	IFK Mariehamn	93	(0)
2018–2020	Örebro	65	(0)
2021–2022	Stal Mielec	29	(0)
2022–2023	IFK Mariehamn	30	(2)
2024–	Inter Turku	67	(0)

International career
2016–2022	Finland	21	(0)
- * Club domestic league appearances and goals as of 12 November 2026

Eddie Albin Alexander Granlund (born 1 September 1989) is a Finnish professional footballer who plays as a right-back for Veikkausliiga club Inter Turku.

== Club career ==
On 20 August 2022, Granlund returned to IFK Mariehamn until the end of the season.

On 1 December 2023, Granlund signed with fellow Veikkausliiga club Inter Turku on a one-year deal.

== International career ==
In August 2016, Granlund was named in Finland's squad for a friendly against Germany, but remained an unused substitute. In January 2017, he made his debut in a friendly win over Morocco. He also played in 2018 FIFA World Cup qualifier wins over Iceland and Kosovo.

Granlund was called up for the UEFA Euro 2020 pre-tournament friendly match against Sweden on 29 May 2021.

== Career statistics ==
=== Club ===
As of 31 March 2025

Appearances and goals by club, season and competition
Club	Season	League			National cup (Note: Includes Suomen Cup, Svenska Cupen and Polish Cup)		League cup (Note: Includes Finnish League Cup)		Europe		Total	
Club	Season	Division	Apps	Goals	Apps	Goals	Apps	Goals	Apps	Goals	Apps	Goals
Pargas IF	2006	Kakkonen	16	3	—		—		—		16	3
Pargas IF	2007	Kolmonen	35	4	—		—		—		35	4
Pargas IF	Total		51	7	0	0	0	0	0	0	51	7
Åbo IFK	2008	Kakkonen	20	0	—		—		—		20	0
Åbo IFK	2009	Kakkonen	24	2	—		—		—		24	2
Åbo IFK	Total		44	2	0	0	0	0	0	0	44	2
RoPS	2010	Ykkönen	26	0	—		—		—		26	0
RoPS	2011	Veikkausliiga	31	1	—		—		—		31	1
RoPS	2012	Ykkönen	25	2	—		—		—		25	2
RoPS	2013	Veikkausliiga	16	1	4	0	—		—		20	1
RoPS	Total		98	4	4	0	0	0	0	0	102	4
IFK Mariehamn	2014	Veikkausliiga	30	0	2	0	6	0	—		38	0
IFK Mariehamn	2015	Veikkausliiga	22	0	6	0	2	0	—		30	0
IFK Mariehamn	2016	Veikkausliiga	21	0	0	0	4	0	2 (Note: Appearances in UEFA Europa League)	0	27	0
IFK Mariehamn	2017	Veikkausliiga	20	0	2	0	—		2 (Note: Appearances in UEFA Champions League)	0	24	0
IFK Mariehamn	Total		93	0	10	0	12	0	4	0	119	0
Åland	2016	Kakkonen	1	0	—		—		—		1	0
Örebro	2018	Allsvenskan	20	0	—		—		—		20	0
Örebro	2019	Allsvenskan	23	0	3	0	—		—		26	0
Örebro	2020	Allsvenskan	22	0	—		—		—		22	0
Örebro	Total		65	0	3	0	0	0	0	0	68	0
Stal Mielec	2020–21	Ekstraklasa	12	0	—		—		—		12	0
Stal Mielec	2021–22	Ekstraklasa	17	0	1	0	—		—		18	0
Stal Mielec	Total		29	0	1	0	0	0	0	0	30	0
IFK Mariehamn	2022	Veikkausliiga	6	1	—		—		—		6	1
IFK Mariehamn	2023	Veikkausliiga	24	1	4	0	2	0	—		30	1
IFK Mariehamn	Total		30	2	4	0	2	0	0	0	36	2
Inter Turku	2024	Veikkausliiga	19	0	4	0	7	1	—		30	1
Inter Turku	2025	Veikkausliiga	0	0	0	0	7	0	—		7	0
Inter Turku	Total		19	0	4	0	14	1	0	0	37	1
Career total			429	15	26	0	30	1	4	0	499	16

=== International ===
Appearances and goals by national team and year
National team	Year	Apps	Goals
Finland
Finland	2017	5	0
Finland	2018	6	0
Finland	2019	6	0
Finland	2020	1	0
Finland	2021	2	0
Finland	2022	1	0
Total		21	0

== Honours ==
RoPS

- Finnish Cup: 2013

IFK Mariehamn

- Veikkausliiga: 2016
- Finnish Cup: 2015

Inter Turku

- Veikkausliiga: 2026
- Finnish Cup: 2026; runner-up: 2024
- Finnish League Cup: 2024, 2025, 2026

Individual

- Veikkausliiga Team of the Year: 2016, 2017
