= Niilo Mäenpää =

Finnish footballer (born 1998)

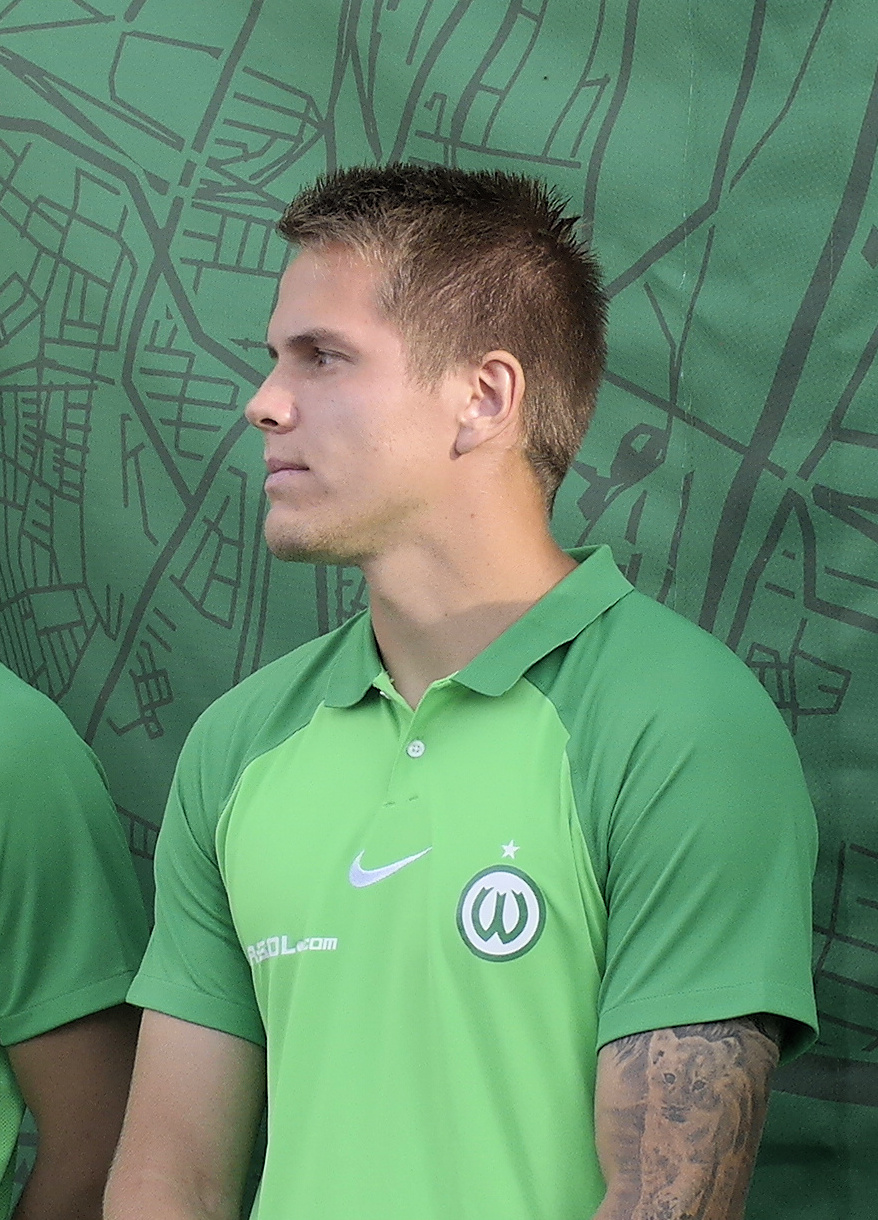
- Mäenpää in 2023 with Warta Poznań

Personal information
- Date of birth: 14 January 1998 (age 28)
- Place of birth: Hämeenlinna, Finland
- Height: 1.82 m (6 ft 0 in)
- Position: Midfielder

Team information
- Current team: Halmstad
- Number: 8

Youth career
- Hämeenlinna
- 2015: Haka

Senior career*
Years	Team	Apps	(Gls)
2014–2015	Hämeenlinna	6	(0)
2015–2018	Haka	66	(4)
2018–2019	Inter Turku	38	(1)
2020–2021	IFK Mariehamn	47	(2)
2022–2024	Warta Poznań	67	(0)
2024–	Halmstad	42	(1)

International career^{‡}
2013–2014	Finland U16		
2014–2015	Finland U17	10	(1)
2016	Finland U18	8	(3)
2015–2017	Finland U19	9	(0)
2019–2020	Finland U21	6	(0)
2022–	Finland	4	(0)
- * Club domestic league appearances and goals as of 9 July 2026 ‡ National team caps and goals as of 20:45, 7 June 2024 (UTC)

Niilo Mäenpää (born 14 January 1998) is a Finnish professional footballer who plays as a midfielder for Allsvenskan club Halmstad and the Finland national team.

== Career ==
=== Hämeenlinna ===
Mäenpää started his senior career with the club, making his first competitive appearance on 23 May 2014 in a 1–0 home victory in the league over Tampereen-Viipurin Ilves-Kissat. He was subbed on for Juho Saarinen in the 68th minute.

=== Haka ===
In January 2015, Mäenpää moved to Ykkönen club FC Haka. He made his league debut for the club on 2 May 2015, playing all ninety minutes in a 2–2 away draw with JJK. He scored his first competitive goal for the club on 2 August 2015 in a 4–3 away victory in the league over MP. His goal, scored in the 69th minute, made the score 4–1 to Haka.

=== Inter Turku ===
In November 2017, Mäenpää moved to Veikkausliiga club Inter Turku, arriving alongside Mikko Kuningas. He made his league debut for the club on 7 April 2018 in a 2–0 away defeat to VPS, playing 63 minutes before being subbed off, to be replaced by Arttu Hoskonen.

=== IFK Mariehamn ===
On 28 November 2019 it was confirmed, that Mäenpää would join IFK Mariehamn from the 2020 season, signing a deal until the end of 2021.

=== Warta Poznań ===
On 22 December 2021, Mäenpää penned a two-and-a-half-year deal with Ekstraklasa club Warta Poznań, effective from 1 January 2022. He was released by the club at the end of the 2023–24 season.

=== Halmstad ===
On 15 July 2024, Swedish club Halmstad announced the signing of Mäenpää. He scored his first Allsvenskan goal on 19 October, in a 3–1 home win against Sirius.

== Personal life ==
Mäenpää's twin brother Aapo is also a professional footballer, playing for Ilves. The two played together in their early years at Hämeenlinna and Haka, before reuniting at Mariehamm beginning in 2020.

== Career statistics ==
=== Club ===
As of 13 May 2025

Appearances and goals by club, season and competition
Club	Season	League			Cup (Note: Includes in the Suomen Cup, Polish Cup and Svenska Cupen)		Continental		Other		Total	
Club	Season	Division	Apps	Goals	Apps	Goals	Apps	Goals	Apps	Goals	Apps	Goals
Hämeenlinna	2014	Kakkonen	6	0	—		—		—		6	0
Hämeenlinna	Total		6	0	—		—		—		6	0
Haka	2015	Ykkönen	18	1	2	0	—		—		20	1
Haka	2016	Ykkönen	23	2	3	0	—		—		26	2
Haka	2017	Ykkönen	25	1	5	5	—		—		30	6
Haka	Total		66	4	10	5	—		—		76	9
Inter Turku	2018	Veikkausliiga	17	0	4	0	—		—		21	0
Inter Turku	2019	Veikkausliiga	21	1	7	0	1 (Note: Appearance in UEFA Europa League)	0	—		29	1
Inter Turku	Total		38	1	11	0	1	0	—		50	1
IFK Mariehamn	2020	Veikkausliiga	21	0	4	0	—		—		25	0
IFK Mariehamn	2021	Veikkausliiga	26	2	3	0	—		—		29	2
IFK Mariehamn	Total		47	2	7	0	—		—		54	2
Warta Poznań	2021–22	Ekstraklasa	12	0	—		—		—		12	0
Warta Poznań	2022–23	Ekstraklasa	31	0	2	0	—		—		33	0
Warta Poznań	2023–24	Ekstraklasa	24	0	3	0	—		—		27	0
Warta Poznań	Total		67	0	5	0	—		—		72	0
Halmstad	2024	Allsvenskan	14	1	1	0	—		—		15	1
Halmstad	2025	Allsvenskan	6	0	3	2	–		–		9	2
Halmstad	Total		20	1	4	2	0	0	0	0	24	3
Career total			244	8	37	7	1	0	—		282	15

=== International ===
As of match played on 7 June 2024

National team	Year	Competitive		Friendly		Total	
National team	Year	Apps	Goals	Apps	Goals	Apps	Goals
Finland	2022	0	0	2	0	2	0
Finland	2023	0	0	1	0	1	0
Finland	2024	0	0	1	0	1	0
Total		0	0	4	0	4	0

== Honours ==
Inter Turku

- Finnish Cup: 2017–18
