= Andreas Vaikla =

Canadian-Estonian footballer (born 1997)

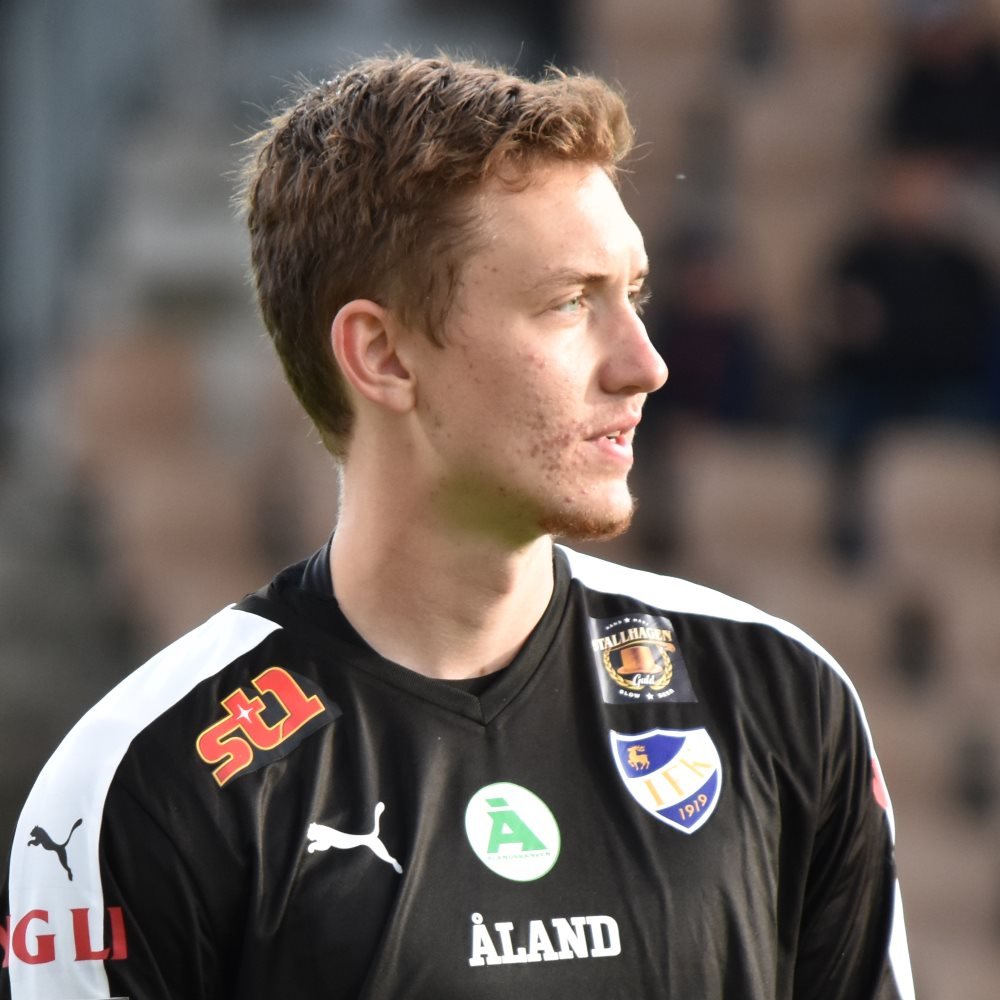
- Vaikla with Mariehamn in 2017

Personal information
- Full name: Andreas Raido Karuks Vaikla
- Date of birth: 19 February 1997 (age 29)
- Place of birth: Toronto, Ontario, Canada
- Height: 1.97 m (6 ft 5 1/2 in)
- Position: Goalkeeper

Team information
- Current team: Scrosoppi FC

Youth career
- Spartacus SC
- Wexford SC
- 2013: North Scarborough SC
- 2013–2015: West Bromwich Albion

Senior career*
Years	Team	Apps	(Gls)
2015–2016	IFK Norrköping	13	(0)
2017	IFK Mariehamn	26	(0)
2018	Kristiansund 2	8	(0)
2018–2019	Kristiansund	1	(0)
2019–2020	IFK Norrköping	0	(0)
2020	Narva Trans	8	(0)
2021–2022	Toronto FC II	13	(0)
2022	→ FC Edmonton (loan)	21	(0)
2023–	Scrosoppi FC	38	(0)

International career^{‡}
2012	Estonia U16	1	(0)
2013	Estonia U17	1	(0)
2015	Estonia U19	10	(0)
2016–2018	Estonia U21	7	(0)
2016–2017	Estonia	3	(0)
- * Club domestic league appearances and goals as of August 23, 2025 ‡ National team caps and goals as of 1 December 2018

Andreas Raido Karuks Vaikla (born 19 February 1997) is a professional footballer who plays as a goalkeeper for Scrosoppi FC in League1 Ontario. Born in Canada, he plays for the Estonia national team.

== Early life ==
Vaikla began playing football in Canada. In 2013, he received a call-up to the Estonia under-16 team, being eligible due to his Estonian parents. He was scouted by West Bromwich Albion in a match against the Republic of Ireland, which led to him later joining the English club's academy the same year.

== Club career ==
In July 2015, Vaikla signed a year-and-a-half contract with Swedish club IFK Norrköping. He was a part of the IFK Norrköping squad that won both the 2015 Allsvenskan and the 2015 Svenska Supercupen, however only appearing as an unused substitute. Vaikla made his debut for the club on 20 February 2016, a day after his 19th birthday, keeping a clean sheet in a 4–0 victory over Östersunds FK in the 2015–16 Svenska Cupen. On April 22, Vaikla made his debut in the Allsvenskan, replacing the injured David Mitov Nilsson in the 19th minute of a 1–2 loss to Falkenbergs FF. He made 13 league appearances in the 2016 season.

In February 2017, Vaikla signed a three-year contract with Finnish champions IFK Mariehamn. He made his debut in the Veikkausliiga on 8 April 2017, in a 5–2 home victory over JJK.

In December 2017, Vaikla signed a two-year contract with Norwegian club Kristiansund.

In August 2019, he returned to Swedish club IFK Norrköping.

In February 2020, he joined Estonian club JK Narva Trans of the top division Meistriliiga, after declining some offers from teams in Scandiavian countries who were only offering backup roles. He dealt with various injuries over the course of the season, eventually having his contract terminated in October, due to continuing injuries.

In May 2021, he signed with Toronto FC II of USL League One. He made his debut on May 29 against North Texas SC in a 1–1 draw. In July, he earned USL League One Save of the Week honours for Week 15 for a save against North Carolina FC. He was named to the USL League One Team of the Week for Weeks 20 and 21.

In March 2022, Vaikla went on loan with Canadian Premier League side FC Edmonton. He made his debut for Edmonton on April 10, in the season-opener against Valour FC.

For the 2023 season, he joined Scrosoppi FC in League1 Ontario. He was named a league Second Team All-Star at the end of the season.

== International career ==
Born in Canada to Estonian parents, Vaikla has represented Estonia at under-16, under-17, under-19, and under-21 levels.

On 14 March 2016, Vaikla was called up by manager Magnus Pehrsson to the Estonia squad to face Norway and Serbia in friendly matches, but remained an unused substitute. He made his debut for the senior national team on 1 June 2016, keeping a clean sheet in a 2–0 friendly home win over Andorra.

== Career statistics ==
=== Club ===
As of August 23, 2025

Appearances and goals by club, season and competition
Club	Season	League			Playoffs		National Cup (Note: Includes the Svenska Cupen, Finnish Cup, Norwegian Cup, Canadian Championship)		Continental		Other		Total	
Club	Season	Division	Apps	Goals	Apps	Goals	Apps	Goals	Apps	Goals	Apps	Goals	Apps	Goals
IFK Norrköping	2015	Allsvenskan	0	0	—		0	0	—		—		0	0
IFK Norrköping	2016	Allsvenskan	13	0	—		5	0	2 (Note: Appearance(s) in UEFA Champions League)	0	—		20	0
IFK Norrköping	Total		13	0	0	0	5	0	2	0	0	0	20	0
IFK Mariehamn	2017	Veikkausliiga	26	0	—		4	0	1	0	—		31	0
Kristiansund 2	2018	3. divisjon	8	0	—		—		—		—		8	0
Kristiansund	2018	Eliteserien	1	0	—		1	0	—		—		2	0
Kristiansund	2019	Eliteserien	0	0	—		0	0	—		—		0	0
Kristiansund	Total		1	0	0	0	1	0	0	0	0	0	2	0
IFK Norrköping	2019	Allsvenskan	0	0	—		1	0	0	0	—		1	0
JK Narva Trans	2020	Meistriliiga	8	0	—		3	0	—		—		11	0
Toronto FC II	2021	USL League One	13	0	—		—		—		—		13	0
FC Edmonton (loan)	2022	Canadian Premier League	21	0	—		1	0	—		—		22	0
Scrosoppi FC	2023	League1 Ontario	17	0	2	0	—		—		—		19	0
Scrosoppi FC	2024	League1 Ontario Premier	11	0	—		—		—		0	0	11	0
Scrosoppi FC	2025	League1 Ontario Premier	10	0	—		1	0	—		0	0	11	0
Scrosoppi FC	Total		38	0	2	0	1	0	0	0	0	0	41	0
Career total			128	0	2	0	16	0	3	0	0	0	149	0

=== International ===
As of 1 December 2018.

National team	Year	Apps	Goals
Estonia	2016	2	0
Estonia	2017	1	0
Total		3	0
