= Kristian Kojola =

Finnish footballer (born 1986)

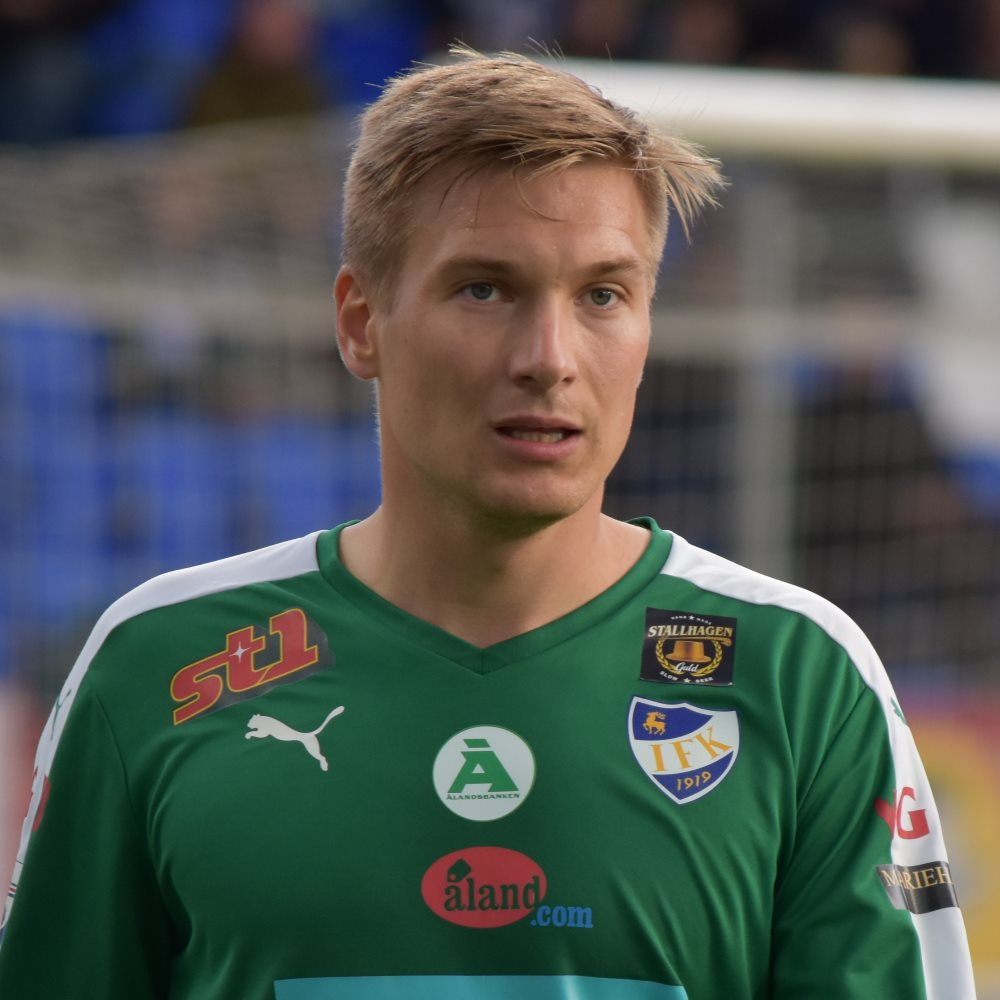

Personal information
- Full name: Kristian Jani-Petteri Kojola
- Date of birth: 12 September 1986 (age 40)
- Place of birth: Espoo, Finland
- Height: 1.87 m (6 ft 2 in)
- Position: Central defender

Senior career*
| Years | Team | Apps | (Gls) |
| 2003–2006 | FC Espoo | 31 | (4) |
| 2005 | → AC Allianssi (loan) | 14 | (1) |
| 2007–2008 | FC Hämeenlinna | 26 | (0) |
| 2008–2009 | FF Jaro | 43 | (2) |
| 2010 | Tampere United | 21 | (4) |
| 2011–2012 | IFK Mariehamn | 61 | (3) |
| 2013–2014 | Hallescher FC | 36 | (1) |
| 2014–2018 | IFK Mariehamn | 137 | (8) |

International career
| 2002–2003 | Finland U-17 | 11 | (0) |
| 2017 | Finland | 1 | (0) |
Medal record
Hallescher FC
| Runner-up | Saxony-Anhalt Cup | 2014 |
- * Club domestic league appearances and goals

Kristian Kojola (born 12 September 1986) is a retired Finnish professional football central defender. Kojola started his senior career in Espoo, Finland where he played for the local team FC Espoo before moving to FC Hämeenlinna. He also represented the Finland national football team.

He retired after the 2018 season.

== Club career ==
=== Early career ===
Kojola started his senior career in 2003 in FC Espoo. During season 2005 he made his Veikkausliiga debut in AC Allianssi. Between 2005 and 2007 he represented FC Hämeenlinna. He made his Veikkausliiga breakthrough in 2008 when he gained 16 caps in FF Jaro. He transferred to Tampere United for the season 2010. In the end of 2010 Tampere United was excluded from participating in Finnish football and Kojola moved to IFK Mariehamn.

=== IFK Mariehamn ===
He gained 61 caps and scored 3 goals for IFK Mariehamn between 2011 and 2012.

=== Hallescher FC ===
Kojola spent season 2013–2014 in German Hallescher FC. He made 36 appearances and scored one goal.

=== Return to IFK Mariehamn ===
After his contract with Hallescher expired in 2014 he returned to IFK Mariehamn for the end of 2014 Veikkausliiga season. They won the 2015 Finnish Cup before claiming the 2016 Veikkausliiga title. In Kojola's final season at the team he also served as the team captain.

== International career ==
Kojola played with the Finland national under-17 football team at 2003 FIFA U-17 World Championship in Finland.

== Honours ==
=== Club ===
Hallescher FC

- Saxony-Anhalt Cup: 2014 Runner-up

IFK Mariehamn

- Veikkausliiga: 2016
- Finnish Cup: 2015

=== Individual ===
- Veikkausliiga Team of the Year: 2016

== Career statistics ==
=== Club ===
As of 6 January 2021

| Club | Season | Division | League | | Domestic Cups | | Europe | | Total | |
| Club | Season | Division | Apps | Goals | Apps | Goals | Apps | Goals | Apps | Goals |
|---|---|---|---|---|---|---|---|---|---|---|
FC Espoo
| FC Espoo | 2003 | Kakkonen | 10 | 1 | 0 | 0 | 0 | 0 | 10 | 1 |
| FC Espoo | 2004 | Kakkonen | 20 | 2 | 0 | 0 | 0 | 0 | 20 | 2 |
| FC Espoo | 2005 | Kakkonen | 4 | 0 | 0 | 0 | 0 | 0 | 4 | 0 |
| FC Espoo | 2006 | Kakkonen | 13 | 1 | 0 | 0 | 0 | 0 | 13 | 1 |
| FC Espoo | FC Espoo Total | | 47 | 4 | 0 | 0 | 0 | 0 | 47 | 4 |
| Allianssi | 2005 | Veikkausliiga | 2 | 0 | 0 | 0 | 0 | 0 | 2 | 2 |
FC Hämeenlinna
| FC Hämeenlinna | 2005 | Ykkönen | 14 | 0 | 0 | 0 | 0 | 0 | 14 | 0 |
| FC Hämeenlinna | 2006 | Ykkönen | 7 | 1 | 0 | 0 | 0 | 0 | 7 | 1 |
| FC Hämeenlinna | 2007 | Ykkönen | 25 | 2 | 0 | 0 | 0 | 0 | 25 | 2 |
| FC Hämeenlinna | FC Hämeenlinna Total | | 46 | 3 | 0 | 0 | 0 | 0 | 46 | 3 |
Jaro
| Jaro | 2008 | Veikkausliiga | 16 | 0 | 0 | 0 | 0 | 0 | 16 | 0 |
| Jaro | 2009 | Veikkausliiga | 26 | 2 | 0 | 0 | 0 | 0 | 26 | 2 |
| Jaro | Jaro Total | | 42 | 2 | 0 | 0 | 0 | 0 | 42 | 2 |
Tampere United
| Tampere United | 2010 | Veikkausliiga | 21 | 4 | 5 | 0 | 0 | 0 | 26 | 4 |
| Tampere United | 2011 | Veikkausliiga | 0 | 0 | 8 | 2 | 0 | 0 | 8 | 2 |
| Tampere United | Tampere United Total | | 21 | 4 | 13 | 2 | 0 | 0 | 34 | 6 |
IFK Mariehamn
| IFK Mariehamn | 2011 | Veikkausliiga | 28 | 2 | 0 | 0 | 0 | 0 | 28 | 2 |
| IFK Mariehamn | 2012 | Veikkausliiga | 32 | 1 | 7 | 0 | 0 | 0 | 38 | 1 |
| IFK Mariehamn | IFK Mariehamn Total | | 60 | 3 | 7 | 0 | 0 | 0 | 67 | 3 |
Hallescher FC
| Hallescher FC | 2012–13 | 3. Liga | 16 | 0 | 0 | 0 | 0 | 0 | 16 | 0 |
| Hallescher FC | 2013–14 | 3. Liga | 20 | 1 | 1 | 0 | 0 | 0 | 21 | 1 |
| Hallescher FC | Hallescher Total | | 36 | 1 | 1 | 0 | 0 | 0 | 37 | 1 |
IFK Mariehamn
| IFK Mariehamn | 2014 | Veikkausliiga | 11 | 1 | 1 | 0 | 0 | 0 | 12 | 1 |
| IFK Mariehamn | 2015 | Veikkausliiga | 30 | 1 | 10 | 2 | 0 | 0 | 40 | 3 |
| IFK Mariehamn | 2016 | Veikkausliiga | 33 | 1 | 6 | 0 | 2 | 0 | 41 | 1 |
| IFK Mariehamn | 2017 | Veikkausliiga | 33 | 3 | 6 | 0 | 2 | 0 | 41 | 3 |
| IFK Mariehamn | 2018 | Veikkausliiga | 30 | 2 | 5 | 0 | 0 | 0 | 35 | 2 |
| IFK Mariehamn | IFK Mariehamn Total | | 137 | 8 | 28 | 2 | 4 | 0 | 169 | 10 |
| Career Total | | | 389 | 25 | 49 | 4 | 4 | 0 | 442 | 29 |
