= Robbin Sellin =

Swedish footballer (born 1990)

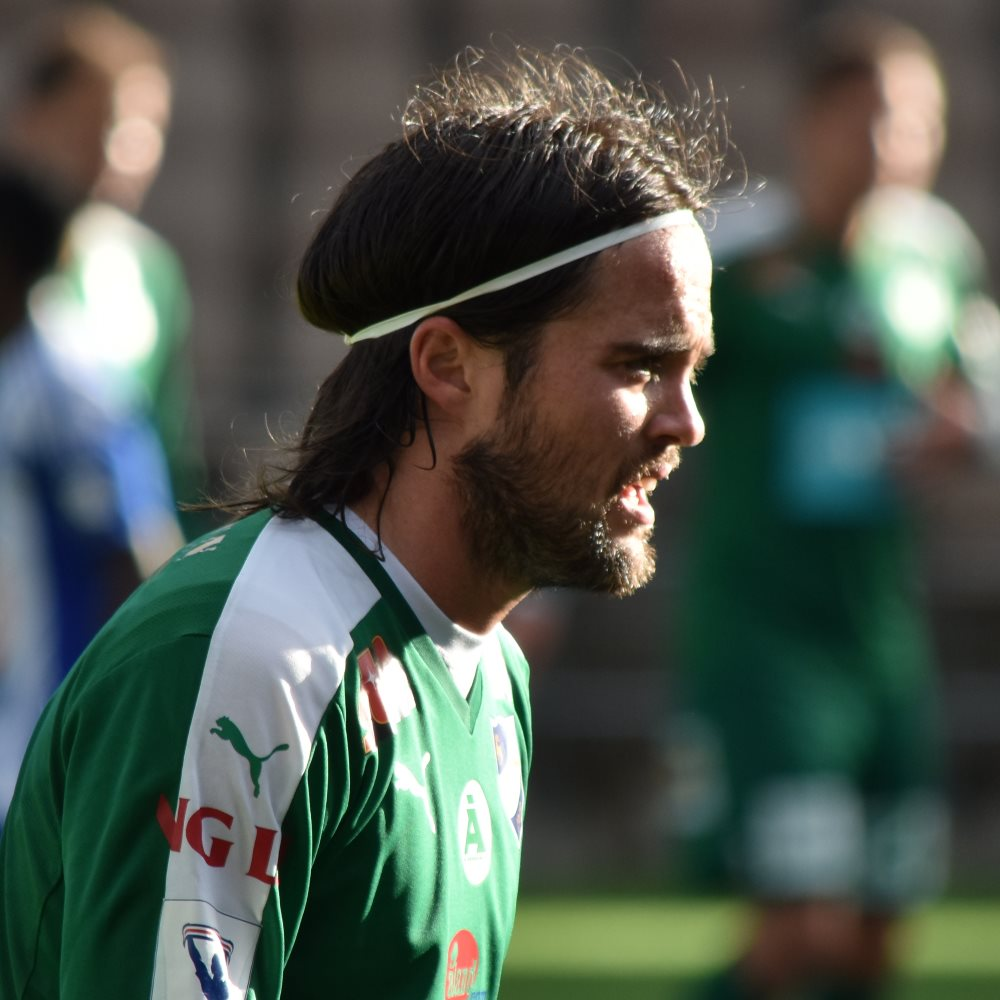

Personal information
- Full name: Robbin Johan Mathias Sellin
- Date of birth: 12 April 1990 (age 36)
- Place of birth: Norrtälje, Sweden
- Height: 1.66 m (5 ft 5 1/2 in)
- Positions: Midfielder; defender

Youth career
- 1994–2005: BKV Norrtälje
- 2006–2008: Djurgårdens IF

Senior career*
Years	Team	Apps	(Gls)
2009–2012	IK Brage	82	(9)
2012–2016	GIF Sundsvall	88	(5)
2017	IFK Mariehamn	24	(5)
2018–2021	IK Brage	106	(18)

International career
2006–2007	Sweden U17	12	(0)
2007	Sweden U19	3	(0)
- * Club domestic league appearances and goals

Robbin Sellin (born 12 April 1990) is a Swedish former footballer who played as a midfielder.

== Career ==
Sellin started playing football at the age of four when he joined his hometown club BKV Norrtälje. After having also spent some time as a youth player at Allsvenskan club Djurgårdens IF he was signed to a first team contract by third-tier side IK Brage in 2009. Two and a half years later, in the middle of the 2012 season, he had impressed enough to make the move up to Allsvenskan when he was signed by GIF Sundsvall.

== International career ==
Sellin has represented both the Sweden men's national under-17 football team and Sweden men's national under-19 football team on several occasions.

== Personal life ==
Sellin grew up supporting Djurgårdens IF. Until the age of 15 he combined playing football with Ice hockey before choosing the former as his career.

== Honours ==
Individual

- Veikkausliiga Top assist provider: 2017
