= Hamed Coulibaly =

Ivorian footballer

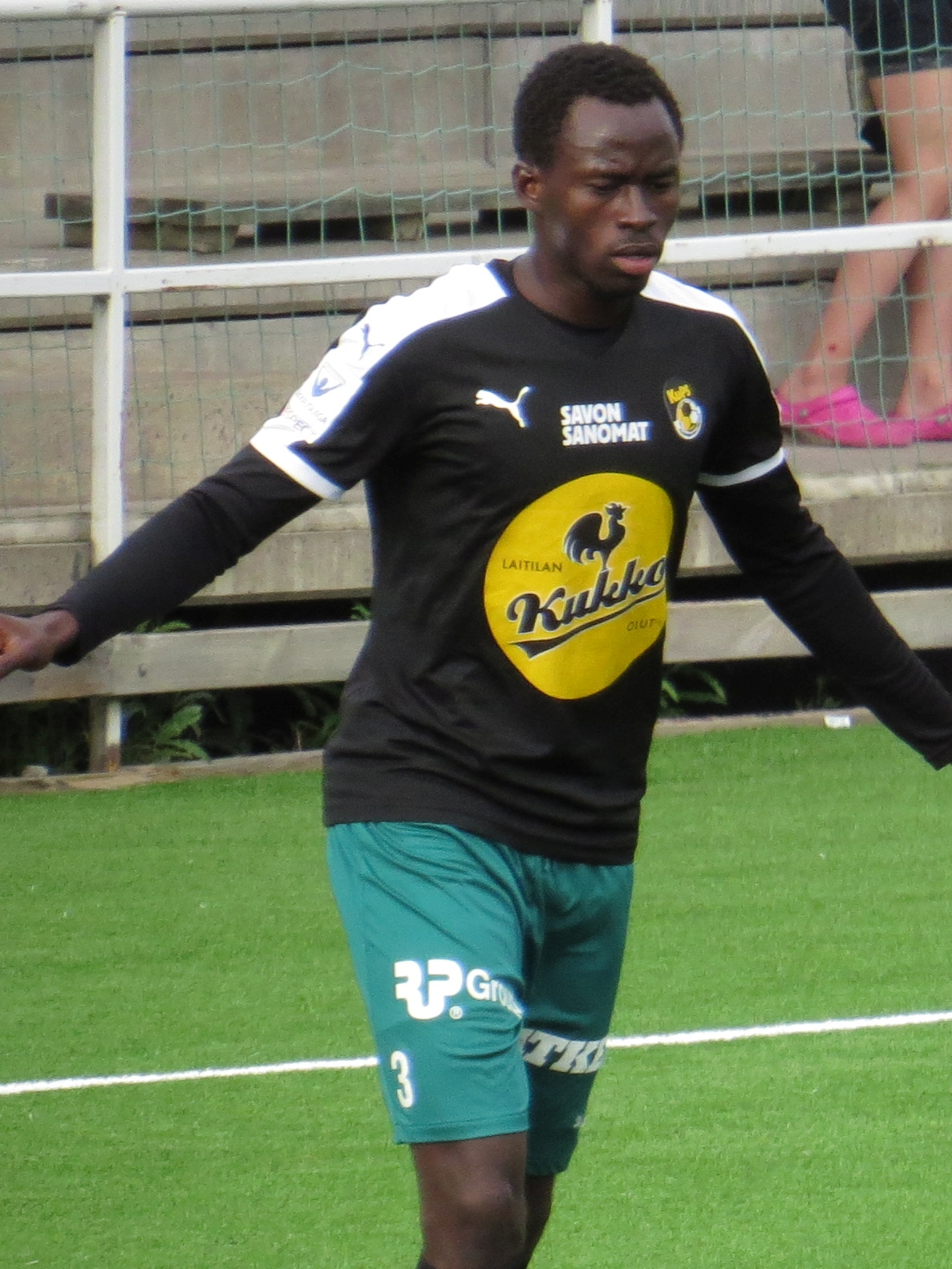
- Coulibaly with KuPS

Personal information
- Full name: Hamed Coulibaly
- Date of birth: 16 December 1996 (age 29)
- Height: 1.87 m (6 ft 2 in)
- Position: Centre-back

Senior career*
Years	Team	Apps	(Gls)
2015–2018	KuPS	51	(3)
2017	→ KuFu-98 (loan)	4	(0)
2018	→ Mariehamn (loan)	11	(0)
2019–2021	Châteaubriant	22	(0)
- * Club domestic league appearances and goals as of 20:38, 9 April 2022 (UTC)

Hamed Coulibaly (born 16 December 1996) is an Ivorian professional footballer who plays as a centre-back.

== Career ==
Coulibaly left KuPS at the end of 2018.

== Honours ==
Individual

- Veikkausliiga Team of the Year: 2017
