= Joel Mattsson =

Finnish footballer (born 1999)

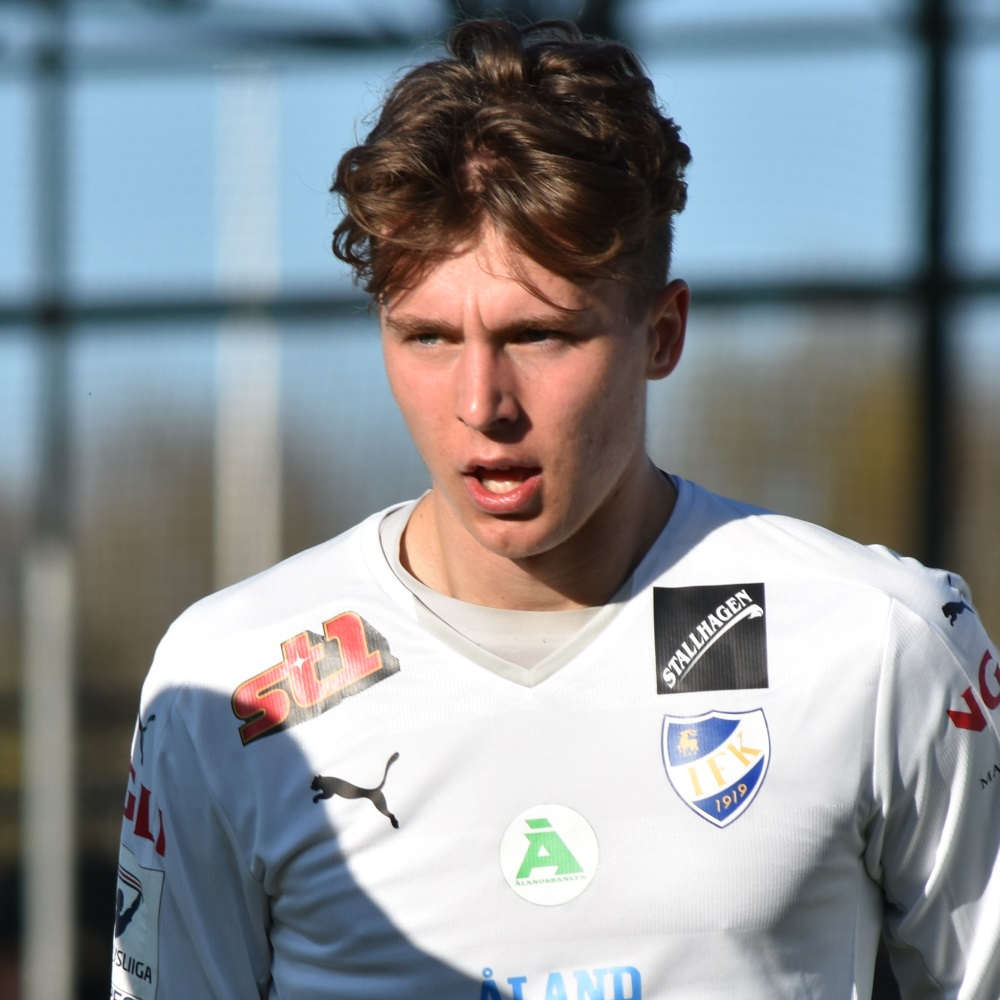

Personal information
- Date of birth: 17 March 1999 (age 27)
- Place of birth: Finland
- Height: 1.80 m (5 ft 11 in)
- Position: Right midfielder

Team information
- Current team: Vejle

Youth career
- Mariehamn

Senior career*
Years	Team	Apps	(Gls)
2015–2018	Mariehamn	50	(1)
2016	→ Åland (loan)	17	(3)
2019–2020	HIFK	44	(5)
2021–	Vejle	0	(0)
2021	→ Mariehamn (loan)	24	(2)

International career
- Finland U19
- * Club domestic league appearances and goals as of 13:51, 31 December 2021 (UTC)

Joel Mattsson (born 17 March 1999) is a Finnish professional footballer who plays for Danish club Vejle BK, as a midfielder.

== Career ==
On 23 December 2018, HIFK announced the signing of Mattsson. In January 2020 Danish club Vejle Boldklub confirmed that Mattson would join the club on a one-and-a-half-year contract from January 2021. He moved on loan to IFK Mariehamn for the 2021 season.
