= Robin Sid =

Finnish footballer (born 1994)

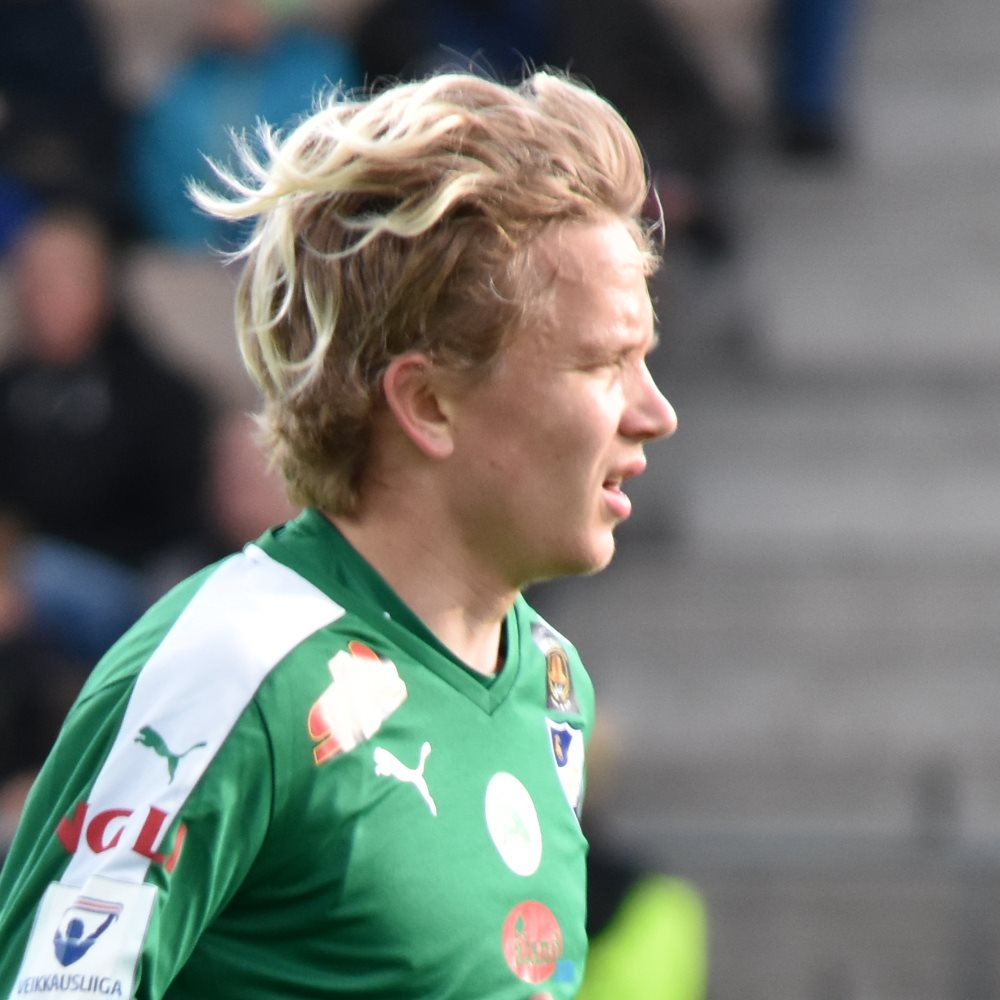
- Sid with IFK Mariehamn in 2017

Personal information
- Full name: Robin Ludvig Sid
- Date of birth: 21 September 1994 (age 32)
- Place of birth: Ingå, Finland
- Height: 1.72 m (5 ft 8 in)
- Positions: Left winger; attacking midfielder

Team information
- Current team: EIF
- Number: 17

Youth career
- Ingå IF
- Ekenäs IF

Senior career*
Years	Team	Apps	(Gls)
2011–2013	EIF	25	(3)
2014–2019	IFK Mariehamn	123	(13)
2014	→ EIF (loan)	17	(3)
2020–2021	SJK	18	(0)
2021	→ SJK II	1	(1)
2021	EIF	13	(2)
2022–2024	IFK Mariehamn	76	(4)
2025–	EIF	27	(5)

International career
2014	Finland U20	1	(0)
- * Club domestic league appearances and goals as of 23 November 2025

Robin Ludvig Sid (born 21 September 1994) is a Finnish football player who plays for Ykkösliiga club Ekenäs IF.

== Career ==
=== Club career ===
On 19 November 2019, Sid signed a deal until the end of 2021 with SJK, starting from the 2020 season.

On 27 January 2022, he returned to IFK Mariehamn for the 2022 season.

== Career statistics ==
As of 21 May 2025

Appearances and goals by club, season and competition
Club	Season	League			Cup		League cup		Europe		Total	
Club	Season	Division	Apps	Goals	Apps	Goals	Apps	Goals	Apps	Goals	Apps	Goals
EIF	2012	Kakkonen	11	3	4	1	–		–		15	4
EIF	2013	Kakkonen	14	0	2	0	–		–		16	0
EIF	Total		25	3	6	1	0	0	0	0	31	4
IFK Mariehamn	2014	Veikkausliiga	5	0	2	1	3	0	–		10	1
IFK Mariehamn	2015	Veikkausliiga	18	0	3	0	4	1	–		25	1
IFK Mariehamn	2016	Veikkausliiga	23	1	2	1	5	0	1	0	31	2
IFK Mariehamn	2017	Veikkausliiga	26	6	4	1	–		2	0	32	7
IFK Mariehamn	2018	Veikkausliiga	28	4	5	0	–		–		33	4
IFK Mariehamn	2019	Veikkausliiga	23	2	7	3	–		–		30	5
IFK Mariehamn	Total		123	13	23	6	12	1	3	0	161	20
EIF (loan)	2014	Kakkonen	17	3	0	0	–		–		17	3
SJK	2020	Veikkausliiga	14	0	1	0	–		–		15	0
SJK	2021	Veikkausliiga	4	0	1	0	–		–		5	0
SJK	Total		18	0	2	0	0	0	0	0	20	0
SJK Akatemia	2021	Kakkonen	1	1	0	0	–		–		1	1
EIF	2021	Ykkönen	13	2	0	0	–		–		13	2
IFK Mariehamn	2022	Veikkausliiga	24	2	4	0	2	0	–		30	2
IFK Mariehamn	2023	Veikkausliiga	25	2	5	1	4	0	–		34	3
IFK Mariehamn	2024	Veikkausliiga	27	0	1	0	3	0	–		31	0
IFK Mariehamn	Total		76	4	10	1	9	0	0	0	85	5
EIF	2025	Ykkösliiga	6	4	1	0	0	0	–		7	4
Career total			279	29	42	8	23	1	3	0	347	39
