= Joel Karlström =

Finnish footballer (born 2001)

Personal information
- Date of birth: 17 May 2001 (age 25)
- Place of birth: Finland
- Height: 1.75 m (5 ft 9 in)
- Position: Midfielder

Team information
- Current team: FC Åland
- Number: 7

Youth career
- IFK Mariehamn

Senior career*
Years	Team	Apps	(Gls)
2017–2021	IFK Mariehamn	26	(1)
2017–2018	→ FC Åland (loan)	14	(0)
2019	→ JIK (loan)	17	(3)
2020	→ FC Åland (loan)	1	(0)
2021	→ Husqvarna FF (loan)	24	(1)
2022–	FC Åland	3	(2)
- * Club domestic league appearances and goals as of 15:17, 12 May 2022 (UTC)

Joel Karlström (born 17 May 2001) is a Finnish professional footballer who plays at FC Åland as a midfielder.

== Club career ==
On 31 March 2021, he joined Swedish club Husqvarna FF on loan for the 2021 season.

== Career statistics ==
As of 12 May 2022

Appearances and goals by club, season and competition
Club	Season	League			National cup		Other		Total	
Club	Season	Division	Apps	Goals	Apps	Goals	Apps	Goals	Apps	Goals
IFK Mariehamn	2017	Veikkausliiga	1	0	2	1	0	0	3	1
IFK Mariehamn	2018	Veikkausliiga	1	0	0	0	–		1	0
IFK Mariehamn	2019	Veikkausliiga	11	0	5	0	–		16	0
IFK Mariehamn	2020	Veikkausliiga	13	1	1	0	–		14	1
IFK Mariehamn	2021	Veikkausliiga	0	0	2	0	–		2	0
IFK Mariehamn	Total		26	1	10	1	0	0	36	2
FC Åland (loan)	2017	Kolmonen	2	0	–		–		2	0
FC Åland (loan)	2018	Kolmonen	12	0	–		–		12	0
FC Åland (loan)	Total		14	0	0	0	0	0	14	0
Jomala IK (loan)	2019	Kolmonen	17	3	–		–		17	3
FC Åland (loan)	2020	Kolmonen	1	0	–		–		1	0
Husqvarna FF (loan)	2021	Division 2 Västra Götaland	24	1	2	0	–		26	1
FC Åland	2022	Kolmonen	3	2	3	1	–		6	3
Career total			85	7	15	2	0	0	100	9
