= Petter Hemming =

Finnish footballer (born 1999)

Personal information
- Date of birth: 17 February 1999 (age 27)
- Place of birth: Finland
- Height: 1.87 m (6 ft 2 in)
- Position: Centre back

Team information
- Current team: FC Åland

Youth career
- IFK Mariehamn

Senior career*
Years	Team	Apps	(Gls)
2015–2019	IFK Mariehamn	2	(0)
2016	→ FC Åland (loan)	3	(0)
2020–	FC Åland	0	(0)
- * Club domestic league appearances and goals as of 10:20, 19 May 2020 (UTC)

Petter Hemming (born 17 February 1999) is a Finnish professional footballer who plays for FC Åland, as a centre back.

== Career ==
=== Club career ===
Hemming signed a two-year professional contract with IFK Mariehamn on 24 November 2016 and was promoted to the first team squad, after having played three Kakkonen games on loan for FC Åland.

On 2 July 2017, Hemming played his first Veikkausliiga match for IFK Mariehamn in a game against VPS. On 7 November 2019 FC Åland confirmed, that Hemming had returned to the club, this time on a permanent basis.
