= Aapo Mäenpää =

Finnish footballer (born 1998)

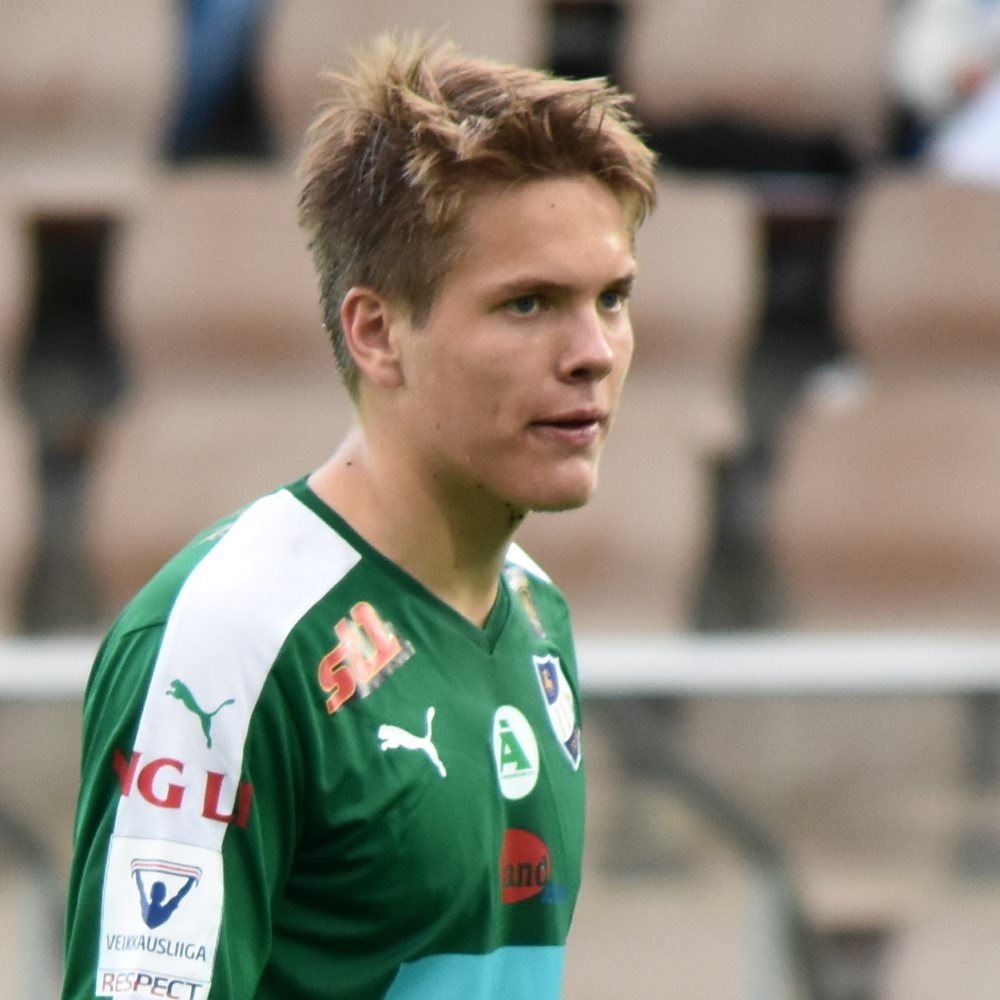
- Mäenpää with IFK Mariehamn in 2017

Personal information
- Full name: Aapo Jalmari Mäenpää
- Date of birth: 14 January 1998 (age 28)
- Place of birth: Hämeenlinna, Finland
- Height: 1.83 m (6 ft 0 in)
- Position: Right back

Team information
- Current team: Haka (on loan from Öster)
- Number: 10

Youth career
- HJS

Senior career*
Years	Team	Apps	(Gls)
2014	Hämeenlinna	5	(0)
2015–2016	Haka	30	(1)
2017–2021	IFK Mariehamn	86	(0)
2022–2025	Ilves	92	(2)
2026–	Öster	7	(0)
2026–	→ Haka (loan)	11	(0)
- * Club domestic league appearances and goals as of 1 November 2026

Aapo Jalmari Mäenpää (born 14 January 1998) is a Finnish professional footballer who plays for Haka, on loan from Öster, as a right back.

== Club career ==
On 4 November 2021, he signed a two-year contract with Ilves, starting in 2022. Later his contract was extended until the end of 2024.

== Personal life ==
Mäenpää's twin brother Niilo is also a professional footballer for Halmstad; the two played together during their early years at Hämeenlinna and Haka, before reuniting at Mariehamm in 2020.

== Career statistics ==
As of 1 November 2026

Appearances and goals by club, season and competition
Club	Season	League			National cup (Note: Includes Suomen Cup)		League cup (Note: Includes Finnish League Cup)		Europe		Total	
Club	Season	Division	Apps	Goals	Apps	Goals	Apps	Goals	Apps	Goals	Apps	Goals
Hämeenlinna	2014	Kakkonen	5	0	–		–		–		5	0
Haka	2015	Ykkönen	11	1	3	0	–		–		14	1
Haka	2016	Ykkönen	19	0	1	0	–		–		20	0
Haka	Total		30	1	4	0	0	0	0	0	34	1
Pallo-Sepot 44 (loan)	2016	Kolmonen	2	0	–		–		–		2	0
IFK Mariehamn	2017	Veikkausliiga	20	0	4	0	–		2 (Note: Appearances in UEFA Champions League)	0	26	0
IFK Mariehamn	2018	Veikkausliiga	11	0	3	0	–		–		14	0
IFK Mariehamn	2019	Veikkausliiga	24	0	9	0	–		–		33	0
IFK Mariehamn	2020	Veikkausliiga	18	0	2	0	–		–		20	0
IFK Mariehamn	2021	Veikkausliiga	13	0	1	0	–		–		14	0
IFK Mariehamn	Total		86	0	19	0	0	0	2	0	107	0
Ilves	2022	Veikkausliiga	22	0	0	0	2	0	–		24	0
Ilves	2023	Veikkausliiga	23	0	6	1	5	0	–		34	1
Ilves	2024	Veikkausliiga	22	1	1	0	5	0	4 (Note: Appearances in UEFA Conference League)	1	32	2
Ilves	2025	Veikkausliiga	25	1	1	0	3	0	4	0	33	1
Ilves	Total		92	2	8	1	15	0	8	1	123	5
Östers IF	2026	Superettan	7	0	1	0	–		–		8	0
FC Haka	2026	Ykkösliiga	11	0	0	0	–		–		11	0
Career total			234	3	32	1	15	0	10	1	290	5

== Honours ==
Ilves

- Finnish Cup: 2023
- Veikkausliiga runner-up: 2024

IFK Mariehamn

- Finnish Cup runner-up: 2019
