= Gabriel Petrović =

Swedish footballer

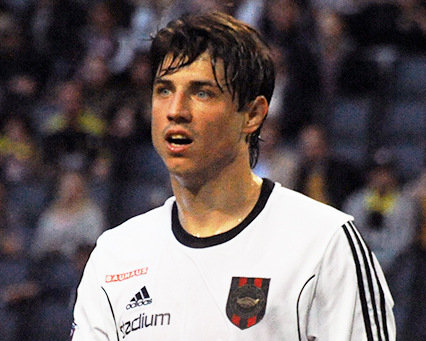

Personal information
- Full name: Gabriel Petrović
- Date of birth: 25 May 1984 (age 42)
- Place of birth: Stockholm, Sweden
- Height: 1.86 m (6 ft 1 in)
- Position: Midfielder

Senior career*
Years	Team	Apps	(Gls)
2002–2003	AIK	7	(0)
2004	Café Opera United	21	(1)
2005	AIK	14	(0)
2006	IFK Mariehamn	23	(1)
2007–2008	Väsby United	60	(9)
2009–2015	Brommapojkarna	155	(7)
2016–2018	IFK Mariehamn	74	(2)
Total		354	(20)

International career
2000–2001	Sweden U17	6	(0)
2001–2003	Sweden U19	14	(0)
- * Club domestic league appearances and goals

Gabriel Petrović (born 25 April 1984) is a Swedish former footballer who played as a midfielder.

== Career ==
He was a defensive midfielder with both Swedish and Bosnian citizenship..

Starting his youth career with AIK, he developed all the way up to the first team squad in the beginning of the 2002 season. On 6 April 2002, he made his league debut, entering the pitch in the 70th minute. Following year he played another six matches in the league and two in the first round of the UEFA cup. In 2005, he played another 14 games for the side and contributed when the club, after only one year in the second division, immediately advanced to the first league. After his contract wasn't renewed, he joined Finnish first team IFK Mariehamn. His first and only year there was successful as the club ended the season in 5th place and he finished second in the assist league, with many of them coming from corners and set pieces. He spent the 2007 and 2008 seasons with Väsby United, which at the time played in 3rd tier league, Division 1. His first year was a success as the team finished second in the league which led to promotion to the Superettan. The team managed a successful run in the 2007 Swedish Cup as they were sent out late in the semifinals against Kalmar, losing 4-1 home at Vilundavallen.

In summer of 2008, AIK offered him a lucrative contract, but he refused as he wanted to concentrate on his team's performance in the league and continue his studies in the School of Naprapathy in Stockholm. In end of 2008, he was transferred to IF Brommapojkarna, newly promoted to the Allsvenskan.

After the 2018 season with IFK Mariehamn, Petrović retired from football.
