= Aleksei Kangaskolkka =

Finnish footballer (born 1988)

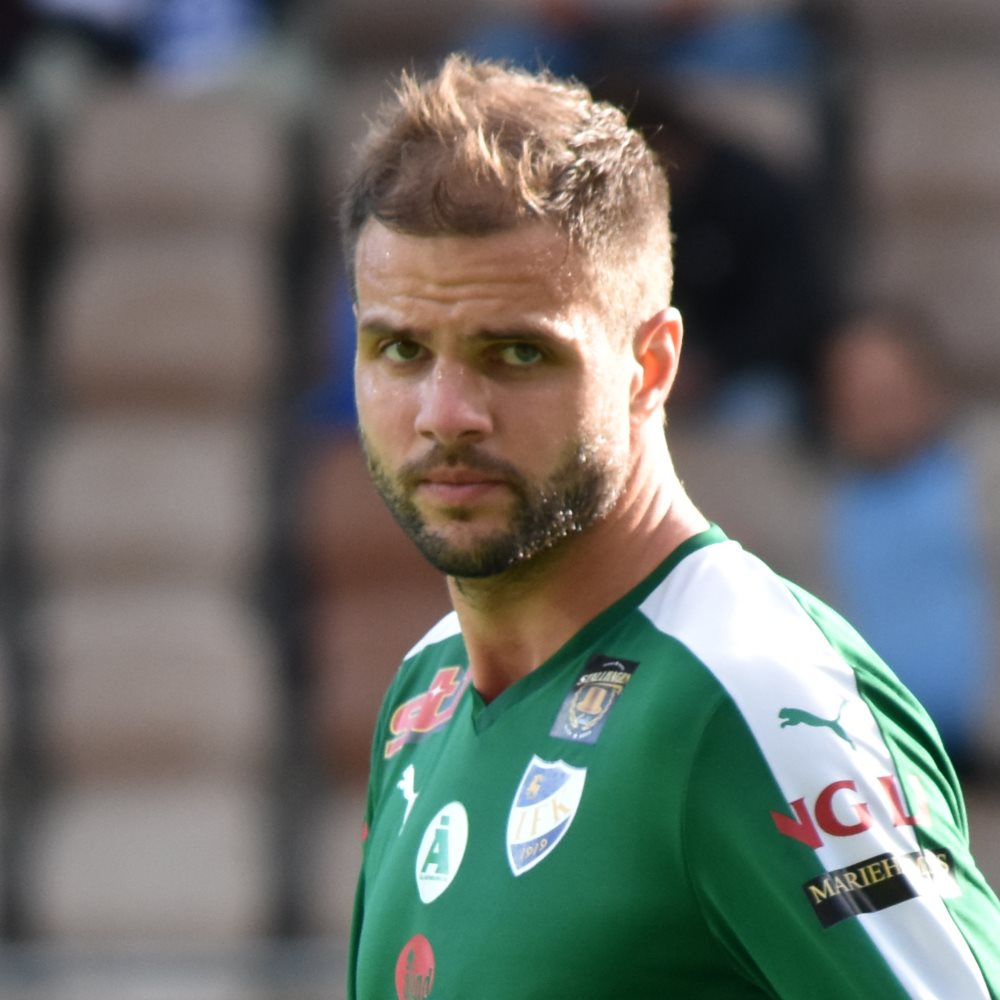

Personal information
- Date of birth: 29 October 1988 (age 37)
- Place of birth: Vyborg, USSR
- Height: 1.88 m (6 ft 2 in)
- Position: Forward

Senior career*
Years	Team	Apps	(Gls)
2004–2008	MyPa	48	(9)
2009–2011	Tampere United	48	(13)
2011–2012	IFK Mariehamn	50	(20)
2013	Jönköping	12	(4)
2013–2015	Heracles Almelo	4	(0)
2015–2018	IFK Mariehamn	99	(34)
Total		261	(80)

International career
2009–2010	Finland U21	11	(1)
- * Club domestic league appearances and goals

Aleksei Kangaskolkka (born 29 October 1988) is a Finnish-Russian former professional footballer who played as a forward.

== Career ==
Kangaskolkka was born in Vyborg, USSR, where he grew up before moving to Finland with his mother and Ingrian Finnish stepfather at the age of eight. In 2004, he made his debut with MyPa in the Finnish top division Veikkausliiga at the young age of sixteen. In that same year he also went on trial with English club Manchester United. In his second year with IFK Mariehamn he had his most successful season yet when he became the second best goalscorer of the 2012 Veikkausliiga. After that Kangaskolkka felt that he wanted to try playing in another league and signed a one-year contract with Jönköpings Södra in the Swedish second tier. On 17 July 2013, he signed with Dutch side Heracles Almelo. In 2015, Kangaskolkka returned to Mariehamn. That year he won Finnish Cup. The next season he won Veikkausliiga, and in the 2017 season he became a top scorer of the league with 16 goals. At the end of the 2018 season, Kangaskolkka announced his retirement from professional football.

== Personal life ==
Kangaskolkka has both Finnish and Russian citizenship and says that he feels equally Finnish and Russian. He speaks the Finnish language better and considers Tampere in Finland to be his home. But he also admits that he supports the Russia men's national ice hockey team when they play against the Finland men's national ice hockey team.

== Career statistics ==
Appearances and goals by club, season and competition
Club	Season	League			Cup (Note: Includes Finnish Cup, Finnish League Cup, Svenska Cupen, KNVB Beker)		Continental		Total	
Club	Season	Division	Apps	Goals	Apps	Goals	Apps	Goals	Apps	Goals
MyPa	2004	Veikkausliiga	1	0	—		—		1	0
MyPa	2005	Veikkausliiga	1	0	—		0	0	1	0
MyPa	2006	Veikkausliiga	22	6	—		4 (Note: Includes UEFA Champions League)	0	26	6
MyPa	2007	Veikkausliiga	16	3	—		3 (Note: Includes UEFA Cup)	0	19	3
MyPa	2008	Veikkausliiga	9	0	—		—		9	0
MyPa	Total		49	9	0	0	7	0	56	9
Tampere United	2009	Veikkausliiga	25	7	3	0	—		28	7
Tampere United	2010	Veikkausliiga	23	6	—		—		23	6
Tampere United	Total		48	13	3	0	—		51	13
IFK Mariehamn	2011	Veikkausliiga	21	4	—		—		21	4
IFK Mariehamn	2012	Veikkausliiga	28	15	3	2	—		31	17
IFK Mariehamn	Total		49	19	3	2	—		52	21
Jönköpings Södra IF	2013	Superettan	12	4	3	2	—		15	6
Heracles Almelo	2013–14	Eredivisie	4	0	0	0	—		4	0
IFK Mariehamn	2015	Veikkausliiga	10	2	1	0	—		11	2
IFK Mariehamn	2016	Veikkausliiga	29	6	7	2	2 (Note: Includes UEFA Europa League)	0	38	8
IFK Mariehamn	2017	Veikkausliiga	30	16	6	3	2	0	38	19
IFK Mariehamn	2018	Veikkausliiga	30	10	5	1	–		35	11
IFK Mariehamn	Total		99	34	19	6	4	0	122	40
Career total			261	79	28	10	11	0	300	89

== Honours ==
MyPa

- Veikkausliiga: 2005

IFK Mariehamn

- Veikkausliiga: 2016
- Finnish Cup: 2015

=== Individual ===
- Veikkausliiga Top score: 2017
- Veikkausliiga Team of the Year: 2017
