= Gaël Etock =

Cameroonian footballer

Personal information
- Full name: Gaël Junior Etock
- Date of birth: 5 July 1993 (age 33)
- Place of birth: Douala, Cameroon
- Height: 1.84 m (6 ft 0 in)
- Position: Striker

Youth career
- Samuel Eto'o Academy
- 2006–2011: Barcelona
- 2011–2012: Sporting

Senior career*
Years	Team	Apps	(Gls)
2012–2014	Sporting	0	(0)
2012–2013	Sporting B	29	(6)
2013–2014	Cercle Brugge	15	(2)
2014	Hapoel Tel Aviv	0	(0)
2015	→ Hapoel Petah Tikva (loan)	3	(0)
2016–2018	JJK Jyväskylä	42	(17)
2018	Riga FC	6	(0)
2019	FC Honka	0	(0)
2019	FC Lahti	17	(5)
Total		112	(30)
- * Club domestic league appearances and goals as of 23:56, 3 November 2019 (UTC)

Gaël Junior Etock (born 5 July 1993) is a Cameroonian footballer who most recently played for FC Lahti in Finland as a striker or winger.

== Club career ==
On 18 August 2012, Gaël made his debut with Sporting B in a 2012–13 Segunda Liga home match against Vitória de Guimarães B where he played 68 minutes. On 26 August 2012, he scored his first goal in a 1–3 away win against Atlético.

On 4 April 2016 he signed for JJK Jyväskylä.

After leaving Riga FC in the summer 2018, Etock signed with FC Honka for the 2019 season. The deal was announced already on 15 November 2018. He played three cup games for the club before he terminated his contract with the club, after failing to break into the team. On 12 April 2019, FC Lahti announced that he had signed a 4-month contract with the club.

== Career statistics ==
Appearances and goals by club, season and competition
Club	Season	League			National cup (Note: Includes Belgian Cup, Latvian Cup, Suomen Cup)		Total	
Club	Season	Division	Apps	Goals	Apps	Goals	Apps	Goals
Sporting	2012–13	Primeira Liga	0	0	0	0	0	0
Sporting B	2012–13	Segunda Liga	29	6	–		29	6
Cercle Brugge	2013–14	Belgian Pro League	15	2	3	0	18	2
Hapoel Tel Aviv	2014–15	Israeli Premier League	0	0	0	0	0	0
Hapoel Petah Tikva (loan)	2014–15	Israeli Premier League	3	0	–		3	0
JJK Jyväskylä	2016	Ykkönen	11	6	0	0	11	6
JJK Jyväskylä	2017	Veikkausliiga	31	11	0	0	31	11
JJK Jyväskylä	Total		42	17	0	0	42	17
Riga FC	2018	Virslīga	6	0	1	1	7	1
Honka	2019	Veikkausliiga	0	0	3	0	3	0
Lahti	2019	Veikkausliiga	17	5	–		17	5
Career total			112	30	7	1	119	31
