= Stênio (footballer, born 1994) =

Brazilian footballer

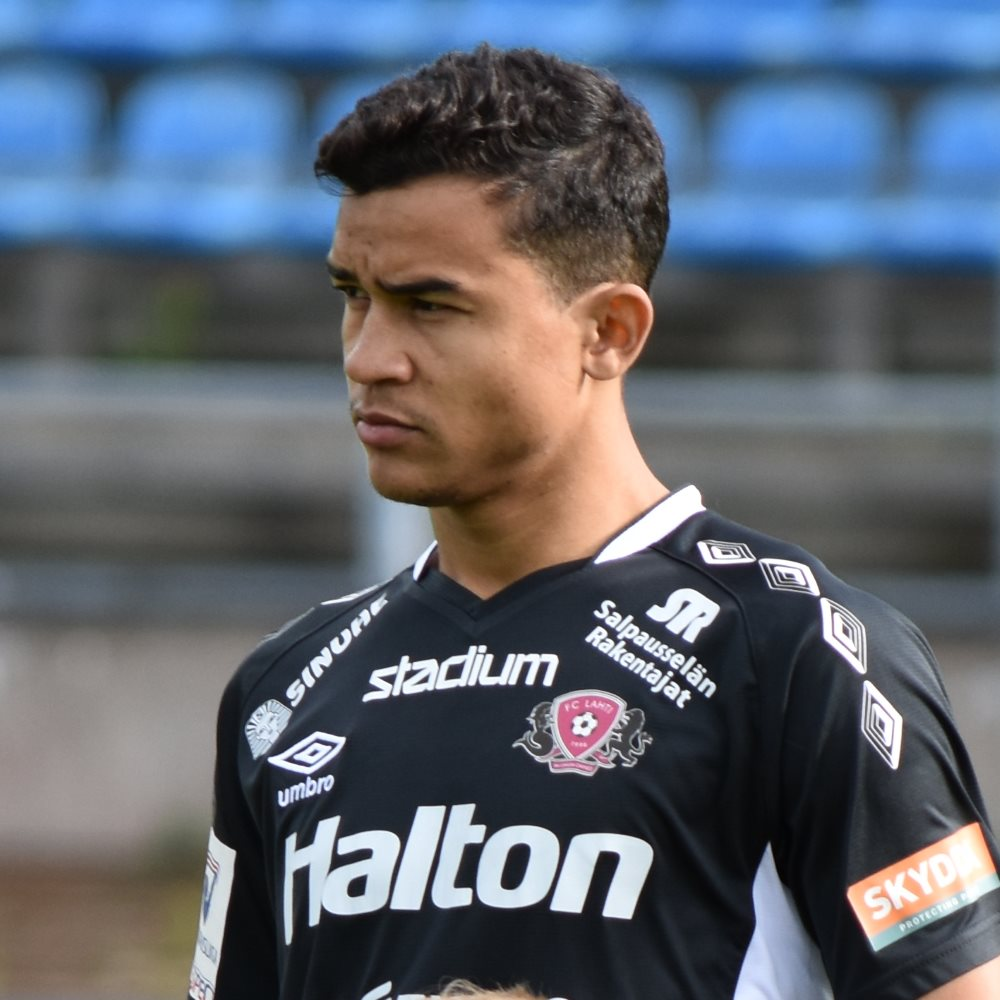

Personal information
- Full name: Stênio Garcia Dutra
- Date of birth: 29 June 1994 (age 32)
- Place of birth: São João do Manteninha, Minas Gerais, Brazil
- Height: 1.80 m (5 ft 11 in)
- Position: Forward

Team information
- Current team: Nova Venécia

Senior career*
Years	Team	Apps	(Gls)
2014–2015	Real Noroeste	0	(0)
2015	Democrata		
2016	Social		
2016–2017	Itaboraí	0	(0)
2017	Portuguesa	0	(0)
2017–2019	Lahti	50	(13)
2019	Atlético Acreano	6	(1)
2019	Laçi	0	(0)
2020	Barbalha	0	(0)
2020	Ilves	5	(0)
2021	Rio Branco	0	(0)
2022–	Nova Venécia	2	(0)
Total		63	(14)
- * Club domestic league appearances and goals as of 21:05, 23 June 2022 (UTC)

Stênio Garcia Dutra (born 29 June 1994), commonly known as Stênio, is a Brazilian footballer who plays as a forward for Nova Venécia.

== Club career ==
Stênio signed for Campeonato Carioca Série B1 side Itaboraí in August 2016, but left the next year for Série D side Portuguesa.

After 6 appearances and 1 goal in the 2017 Campeonato Carioca, Stênio signed for Finnish side FC Lahti in March 2017.

== Career statistics ==
=== Club ===
As of 13 May 2020.

Club	Season	League			State League		Cup		Continental		Other		Total	
Club	Season	Division	Apps	Goals	Apps	Goals	Apps	Goals	Apps	Goals	Apps	Goals	Apps	Goals
Real Noroeste	2015	–			0	0	3 (Note: Appearances in the Copa do Brasil)	3	–		0	0	3	3
Itaboraí	2016	–			0	0	0	0	–		8 (Note: Appearances in the Copa Rio)	3	8	3
Portuguesa	2017	Série D	0	0	6 (Note: Appearances in the Campeonato Carioca)	1	0	0	–		0	0	6	1
Lahti	2017	Veikkausliiga	29	9	–		0	0	–		0	0	29	9
Lahti	2018	Veikkausliiga	21	4	–		4 (Note: Appearances in the Finnish Cup)	1	1 (Note: Appearances in the UEFA Europa League)	0	0	0	26	5
Lahti	Total		50	13	0	0	4	1	1	0	0	0	55	14
Atlético Acreano	2019	Série C	6	1	0	0	0	0	–		0	0	6	1
Laçi	2019-20	Superliga	0	0	–		2 (Note: Appearances in the Albanian Cup)	0	–		0	0	2	0
Barbalha	2020	–			6 (Note: Appearances in the Campeonato Cearense)	0	0	0	–		0	0	6	0
Career total			56	14	12	1	9	4	1	0	8	3	86	22
