= 2016 Kakkonen =

Kakkonen
- Season: 2016
- Promoted: FC Honka; Gnistan
- Relegated: FC Futura; FCV; MPS; FC Åland; Atlantis FC; FC Kontu; PPT; FC Santa Claus; Virkiä

A total of 36 teams will contest the league divided into three groups, Lohko A (Group A), Lohko B (Group B) and Lohko C (Group C). 25 returning from the 2015 season, two relegated from Ykkönen and nine promoted from Kolmonen. The champion of each group and the best runner-up will qualify to promotion matches to decide which two teams get promoted to the Ykkönen. The bottom three teams in each group will qualify directly for relegation to Kolmonen. Each team will play a total of 22 matches, playing twice against each team of its group.

VIFK and MP were relegated from the 2015 Ykkönen, while KPV and GrIFK were promoted to the 2016 Ykkönen.

ÅIFK, FC Kiisto, FC Myllypuro, I-Kissat, JBK, JIPPO, KaaPo, Kerho 07, Masku, NJS, P-Iirot and PK Keski-Uusimaa were relegated from 2015 Kakkonen.

EsPa, FC Åland, FC Espoo, Hercules, MPS, PEPO, PPT, SC KuFu-98 and Virkiä were promoted from the 2015 Kolmonen.

ESC gave up its place in Kakkonen. The place was taken by FC Kontu.

== Groups ==
Location of the 2014 Kakkonen teams. Lohko A (Group A) are red dots, Lohko B (Group B) are blue dots while Lohko C (Group C) are green dots.

=== Lohko A (Group A) ===
No.	Abbreviated Name	Town or Settlement	Official Club and Team Name	Movements from 2015
1.	FC Futura	Porvoo	FC Futura	
2.	FC Lahti Akatemia	Lahti	FC Kuusysi	
3.	FCV	Jyväskylä	FC Vaajakoski	
4.	Gnistan	Helsinki	IF Gnistan	
5.	JäPS	Järvenpää	Järvenpään Palloseura	
6.	Kultsu FC	Lappeenranta	Kultsu FC	
7.	KäPa	Helsinki	Käpylän Pallo	
8.	MPS	Helsinki	Malmin Palloseura	Promoted from 2015 Kolmonen
9.	MP	Mikkeli	Mikkelin Palloilijat	Relegated from 2015 Ykkonen
10.	PEPO	Lappeenranta	PEPO Lappeenranta	Promoted from 2015 Kolmonen
11.	SC KuFu-98	Kuopio	Soccer Club Kuopio Futis -98	Promoted from 2015 Kolmonen
12.	Sudet	Kouvola	Sudet	

=== Lohko B (Group B) ===
No.	Abbreviated Name	Town or Settlement	Official Club and Team Name	Movements from 2015
1.	Atlantis FC	Helsinki	Atlantis FC	
2.	BK-46	Karis	Bollklubben-46	
3.	EsPa	Espoo	Etelä-Espoon Pallo	Promoted from 2015 Kolmonen
4.	FC Espoo	Espoo	FC Espoo	Promoted from 2015 Kolmonen
5.	FC Honka	Espoo	FC Honka	
6.	FC Kiffen	Helsinki	FC Kiffen 08	
7.	FC Kontu	Helsinki	FC Kontu	
8.	FC Viikingit	Helsinki	FC Viikingit Edustus	
9.	FC Åland	Sund, Åland	Football Club Åland	Promoted from 2015 Kolmonen
10.	Klubi-04	Helsinki	Helsingin Jalkapalloklubi	
11.	SalPa	Salo	Salon Palloilijat	
12.	TPV	Tampere	Tampereen Pallo-Veikot	

=== Lohko C (Group C) ===
No.	Abbreviated Name	Town or Settlement	Official Club and Team Name	Movements from 2015
1.	AC Kajaani	Kajaani	AC Kajaani	
2.	FC Jazz 2	Pori	FC Jazz 2	Promoted from 2015 Kolmonen
3.	FC Santa Claus AC	Rovaniemi	FC Santa Claus Arctic Circle	
4.	GBK	Kokkola	Gamlakarleby Bollklubb	
5.	Närpes Kraft	Närpes	Närpes Kraft Fotbollsförening	
6.	FC YPA	Ylivieska	Jalkapalloseura FC YPA	
7.	Hercules	Oulu	Jalkapalloseura Hercules	Promoted from 2015 Kolmonen
8.	Virkiä	Lapua	Lapuan Virkiä	Promoted from 2015 Kolmonen
9.	MuSa	Pori	Musan Salama	
10.	OPS	Oulu	Oulun Palloseura	
11.	TP-47	Tornio	Tornion Pallo -47	
12.	VIFK	Vaasa	Idrottsföreningen Kamraterna Vasa	Relegated from 2015 Ykkonen

== League tables ==
=== Lohko A (Group A) ===
Pos	Team	Pld	W	D	L	GF	GA	GD	Pts	Qualification or relegation
1	Gnistan (P)	22	15	3	4	45	25	+20	48	Qualification to Promotion playoffs
2	SC KuFu-98	22	13	4	5	42	23	+19	43	
3	MP	22	11	3	8	44	36	+8	36	
4	JäPS	22	7	10	5	33	23	+10	31	
5	FC Lahti Akatemia	22	8	7	7	31	32	−1	31	
6	PEPO	22	9	3	10	39	32	+7	30	
7	Kultsu FC	22	9	3	10	30	27	+3	30	
8	KäPa	22	8	6	8	27	30	−3	30	
9	Sudet	22	7	5	10	32	39	−7	26	
10	FC Futura (R)	22	7	3	12	31	48	−17	24	Relegation to Kolmonen
11	FCV (R)	22	5	7	10	31	46	−15	22	Relegation to Kolmonen
12	MPS (R)	22	3	6	13	23	47	−24	15	Relegation to Kolmonen

Rules for classification: 1) points; 2) goal difference; 3) number of goals scored.
(P) Promoted; (R) Relegated

=== Lohko B (Group B) ===
Pos	Team	Pld	W	D	L	GF	GA	GD	Pts	Qualification or relegation
1	FC Honka (P)	22	19	1	2	74	9	+65	58	Qualification to Promotion playoffs
2	TPV	22	14	3	5	47	22	+25	45	
3	BK-46	22	13	2	7	51	35	+16	41	
4	FC Espoo	22	11	4	7	41	38	+3	37	
5	Klubi 04	22	10	5	7	40	32	+8	35	
6	FC Kiffen	22	9	4	9	31	31	0	31	
7	SalPa	22	6	7	9	31	33	−2	25	
8	FC Viikingit	22	5	8	9	29	37	−8	23	
9	EsPa	22	6	4	12	21	55	−34	22	
10	FC Åland (R)	22	5	6	11	25	38	−13	21	Relegation to Kolmonen
11	Atlantis FC (R)	22	5	5	12	25	36	−11	20	Relegation to Kolmonen
12	FC Kontu (R)	22	2	5	15	20	69	−49	11	Relegation to Kolmonen

Rules for classification: 1) points; 2) goal difference; 3) number of goals scored.
(P) Promoted; (R) Relegated

=== Lohko C (Group C) ===
Pos	Team	Pld	W	D	L	GF	GA	GD	Pts	Qualification or relegation
1	OPS	22	15	3	4	70	31	+39	48	Qualification to Promotion playoffs
2	MuSa	22	15	3	4	51	18	+33	48	Qualification to Promotion playoffs
3	AC Kajaani	22	14	3	5	84	24	+60	45	
4	GBK	22	12	4	6	60	25	+35	40	
5	TP-47	22	11	4	7	37	34	+3	37	
6	FC YPA	22	10	3	9	40	36	+4	33	
7	Närpes Kraft	22	9	4	9	39	39	0	31	
8	Hercules	22	8	4	10	39	41	−2	28	
9	VIFK	22	8	3	11	37	35	+2	27	
10	PPT (R)	22	7	4	11	40	43	−3	25	Relegation to Kolmonen
11	FC Santa Claus AC (R)	22	2	2	18	24	102	−78	8	Relegation to Kolmonen
12	Virkiä (R)	22	2	1	19	23	116	−93	7	Relegation to Kolmonen

Rules for classification: 1) points; 2) goal difference; 3) number of goals scored.
(R) Relegated

=== Runner-up teams ===
At the end of the season, a comparison is made between the runners-up. The best runner-up will qualify to promotion matches.

Pos	Grp	Team	Pld	W	D	L	GF	GA	GD	Pts	Qualification
1	C	MuSa	22	15	3	4	51	18	+33	48	Qualification to Promotion playoffs
2	B	TPV	22	14	3	5	47	22	+25	45	
3	A	SC KuFu-98	22	13	4	5	42	23	+19	43	

Rules for classification: 1) points; 2) goal difference; 3) number of goals scored.

=== Promotion play-offs ===
Group winners and the best runner-up will play two-legged ties. Team pairs will be drawn and the two winning teams will be promoted to the Ykkönen for season 2017.

Group winners

- Lohko A (Group A): Gnistan
- Lohko B (Group B): FC Honka
- Lohko C (Group C): OPS

The best runner-up
MuSa

==== First leg ====
8 October 2016
14:00

MuSa	1–0	Gnistan
Miftari 82'	Report

Musan kenttä, Pori
Attendance: 1,630

9 October 2016
16:30

Honka	2–2	OPS
Douglas Silveira 14'; Liikonen 55'	Report	Venício Ferreira 6'; Nzekwe 20'

Tapiolan urheilupuisto, Espoo
Attendance: 2,087

==== Second leg ====
15 October 2016
14:00

Gnistan	1–0	MuSa
Jeng 59'	Report
Penalties
Dudu (penalty scored); Kaukomaa (penalty scored); Nyholm (penalty missed); Gerxhaliu (penalty scored); Strandvall (penalty scored)	4–3	(penalty missed) Vainionpää; (penalty scored) Junnila; (penalty missed) Salo; (penalty scored) Salminen; (penalty scored) Miftari

Oulunkylän urheilupuisto, Helsinki
Attendance: 881

1–1 on aggregate. Gnistan won 4–3 on penalties.

16 October 2016
15:00

OPS	1–2	FC Honka
Belov 45'	Report	Jean Silva 6' (pen.); Ivanov 73' (pen.)

Castrén, Oulu
Attendance: 591

FC Honka won 4–3 on aggregate.
