= 2017 Veikkausliiga =

Veikkausliiga
- Season: 2017
- Champions: HJK
- Relegated: HIFK; JJK Jyväskylä
- Champions League: HJK
- Europa League: KuPS; Ilves; Lahti
- Matches: 198
- Goals: 542 (2.74 per match)
- Top goalscorer: Aleksei Kangaskolkka; 16 goals
- Biggest home win: HJK 6–0 SJK (31 May)
- Biggest away win: SJK 0–6 HJK (10 August)
- Highest scoring: FC Inter 6–2 RoPS (12 April); Lahti 6–2 Mariehamn (29 July)

The 2017 Veikkausliiga was the 87th season of top-tier football in Finland. IFK Mariehamn were the defending champions.

Fixtures for the 2017 season were announced on 19 January 2017. The season started on 5 April 2017 and ended on 28 October 2017.

== Teams ==
PK-35 Vantaa were relegated to Ykkönen after finishing at the bottom of the 2016 season. Their place was taken by Ykkönen champions JJK.

FC Inter as 11th-placed team regained their Veikkausliiga spot after beating the second-placed Ykkönen team TPS 2–0 on aggregate in a relegation/promotion playoff.

=== Stadia and locations ===
Location of teams in 2016 Veikkausliiga

Club	Location	Stadium	Turf	Capacity
FC Inter Turku	Turku	Veritas Stadion	Natural	10,000
FC Lahti	Lahti	Lahden Stadion	Natural	15,000
HIFK Fotboll	Helsinki	Telia 5G -areena	Artificial	10,770
Helsingin Jalkapalloklubi	Helsinki	Telia 5G -areena	Artificial	10,770
IFK Mariehamn	Mariehamn	Wiklöf Holding Arena	Natural	4,000
FC Ilves	Tampere	Tammelan Stadion	Natural	5,040
JJK Jyväskylä	Jyväskylä	Harjun stadion	Natural	3,000
Kuopion Palloseura	Kuopio	Savon Sanomat Areena	Artificial	5,000
Palloseura Kemi Kings	Kemi	Sauvosaaren Urheilupuisto	Natural	4,500
RoPS	Rovaniemi	Rovaniemen keskuskenttä	Artificial	4,000
Seinäjoen Jalkapallokerho	Seinäjoki	OmaSP Stadion	Artificial	6,000
Vaasan Palloseura	Vaasa	Elisa Stadion	Artificial	6,000

=== Personnel and kits ===
Club	Manager	Captain	Kit manufacturer	Sponsors
FC Inter	(Italy) Fabrizio Piccareta	(Finland) Timo Furuholm	Nike	Alfons Håkans
FC Lahti	(Finland) Toni Korkeakunnas	(Finland) Mikko Hauhia	Umbro	BE Group; Lahti Energia; Halton
HIFK	(Finland) Antti Muurinen	(Finland) Mika Väyrynen	Puma	Aktia Bank
HJK	(Finland) Mika Lehkosuo	(Brazil) Rafinha	Adidas	Apu
IFK Mariehamn	(Finland) Peter Lundberg	(Finland) Jani Lyyski	Puma	Hotell Arkipelag
Ilves	(Finland) Jarkko Wiss	(Finland) Antti Hynynen	Adidas	Various
JJK	(Finland) Juha Pasoja	(Finland) Tommi Kari	Nike	Harvia
KuPS	(Finland) Jani Honkavaara	(Finland) Sebastian Sorsa	Puma	Laitilan Wirvoitusjuomatehdas
PS Kemi	(Finland) Jari Åhman	(Finland) Lassi Nurmos	Stanno	Various
RoPS	(Finland) Juha Malinen	(Finland) Antti Okkonen	Puma	Saraware
SJK	(Scotland) Brian Page (Finland) Toni Lehtinen	(Estonia) Mihkel Aksalu	Adidas	LähiTapiola; EPKK; Prima Power
VPS	(Finland) Petri Vuorinen	(Finland) Veli Lampi	Puma	Various

=== Managerial changes ===
Team	Outgoing manager	Manner of departure	Date of vacancy	Incoming manager	Date of appointment	Table
KuPS	(Finland) Marko Rajamäki	End of contract	n/a	(Finland) Jani Honkavaara	17 October 2016	Pre-season
SJK	(Finland) Simo Valakari	Sacked	17 February 2017	(Finland) Sixten Boström	20 February 2017	Pre-season
SJK	(Finland) Sixten Boström	Sacked	2 June 2017	(Spain) Manuel Roca	2 June 2017	8th
FC Inter Turku	(Finland) Shefki Kuqi	Sacked	3 August 2017	(Italy) Fabrizio Piccareta	3 August 2017	9th
SJK	(Spain) Manuel Roca	Sacked	9 September 2017	(Scotland) Brian Page (Finland) Toni Lehtinen	9 September 2017	5th

== League table ==
Pos	Team	Pld	W	D	L	GF	GA	GD	Pts	Qualification or relegation
1	HJK (C)	33	23	7	3	78	16	+62	76	Qualification for the Champions League first qualifying round
2	KuPS	33	16	8	9	51	36	+15	56	Qualification for the Europa League first qualifying round (Note: Since HJK, winners of the 2016–17 Finnish Cup, qualified for the Champions League first qualifying round, the spot awarded to the cup winner (Europa League first qualifying round) is passed to the next best-placed team (in this case to the fourth-placed team).)
3	Ilves	33	15	11	7	39	35	+4	56	Qualification for the Europa League first qualifying round
4	Lahti	33	12	13	8	46	31	+15	49	Qualification for the Europa League first qualifying round
5	IFK Mariehamn	33	13	10	10	44	42	+2	49	
6	SJK	33	13	8	12	42	47	−5	47	
7	RoPS	33	12	6	15	43	51	−8	42	
8	VPS	33	9	12	12	38	51	−13	39	
9	Inter Turku	33	10	8	15	54	57	−3	38	
10	PS Kemi Kings	33	8	8	17	38	59	−21	32	
11	HIFK (R)	33	6	11	16	37	54	−17	29	Qualification for the relegation play-offs
12	JJK Jyväskylä (R)	33	6	8	19	32	63	−31	26	Relegation to the Ykkönen

Updated to match(es) played on 28 October 2017. Source: Veikkausliiga (in Finnish), Soccerway
Rules for classification: 1) Points; 2) Goal difference; 3) Goals scored; 4) Head-to-head points; 5) Head-to-head goal difference; 6) Head-to-head away goals scored; 7) Play-off
(Note: Play-off is only played if need to decide champion, teams for relegation or UEFA competition and will be played on a neutral ground).
(C) Champions; (R) Relegated

== Results ==
Each team plays three times against every other team, either twice at home and once away or once at home and twice away, for a total of 33 matches played each.

=== Matches 1–22 ===
Home \ Away	HIFK	HJK	ILV	INT	JJK	KPS	LAH	MAR	PSK	RPS	SJK	VPS
HIFK	—	0–0	0–1	0–2	0–0	1–4	1–2	1–1	0–2	1–0	0–2	2–1
HJK	2–0	—	2–0	1–1	4–0	2–0	0–0	2–0	3–1	0–1	6–0	5–0
Ilves	4–3	1–1	—	0–2	2–1	1–0	1–1	3–0	2–4	0–2	1–0	0–0
Inter Turku	3–0	1–1	1–1	—	4–0	1–1	0–0	1–1	1–3	6–2	0–1	0–1
JJK Jyväskylä	0–3	1–5	3–1	1–2	—	0–0	1–3	1–0	2–1	1–1	0–2	1–4
KuPS	2–1	0–2	0–1	2–1	1–0	—	2–2	1–2	3–0	3–0	1–1	2–2
Lahti	4–1	0–0	0–0	1–0	1–1	1–2	—	6–2	1–0	1–1	1–0	0–0
IFK Mariehamn	1–1	1–1	2–2	5–0	5–2	2–1	0–2	—	3–0	2–1	0–0	1–1
PS Kemi Kings	0–0	0–1	0–0	2–1	1–1	1–4	1–1	3–0	—	1–1	3–1	0–1
RoPS	2–2	1–4	1–0	2–0	2–1	0–1	1–0	3–0	3–1	—	1–2	2–4
SJK	3–3	0–6	1–2	0–3	1–0	1–0	1–1	1–1	1–0	3–0	—	0–1
VPS	1–1	2–1	0–2	3–2	1–1	2–2	0–2	0–0	3–3	1–0	1–3	—

Source: Veikkausliiga (in Finnish)
Legend: Blue = home team win; Yellow = draw; Red = away team win.

=== Matches 23–33 ===
Home \ Away	HIFK	HJK	ILV	INT	JJK	KPS	LAH	MAR	PSK	RPS	SJK	VPS
HIFK	—	–	–	–	1–1	–	–	0–0	4–0	1–0	2–2	–
HJK	2–1	—	–	–	–	1–0	3–0	1–0	4–0	2–3	–	–
Ilves	2–1	1–4	—	–	–	1–0	2–1	–	1–0	3–2	–	–
Inter Turku	4–1	1–3	2–2	—	–	1–2	1–6	–	–	–	–	–
JJK Jyväskylä	–	0–4	0–0	1–3	—	–	2–4	–	–	–	–	2–0
KuPS	3–2	–	–	–	2–1	—	–	2–1	–	1–1	2–1	–
Lahti	2–1	–	–	1–0	–	1–1	—	–	0–1	1–1	–	–
IFK Mariehamn	–	–	0–1	2–1	2–1	–	–	—	3–2	–	2–1	1–0
PS Kemi Kings	–	–	–	1–5	1–2	1–3	–	–	—	–	3–3	1–1
RoPS	–	–	–	4–2	2–0	–	–	0–3	0–1	—	0–3	3–0
SJK	–	0–2	0–0	5–0	0–4	–	1–0	–	–	–	—	2–1
VPS	1–2	0–3	1–1	2–2	–	1–3	2–1	–	–	–	–	—

Source: Veikkausliiga (in Finnish)
Legend: Blue = home team win; Yellow = draw; Red = away team win.

== Relegation play-offs ==
=== First Match ===
1 November 2017
18:30

FC Honka	0–0	HIFK

Tapiolan Urheilupuisto, Espoo
Attendance: 2,674
Referee: Mattias Gestranius (Pargas)

=== Second Match ===
4 November 2017
14:00

HIFK	1–1	FC Honka
Sihvola 90+4'		Äijälä 28'

Telia 5G -areena, Helsinki
Attendance: 4,158

FC Honka won 1-1 on away goals.

== Statistics ==
=== Top scorers ===
Source: veikkausliiga.com (in Finnish)

As of match played 28 October 2017.

Rank	Player	Club	Goals
1	(Finland) Aleksei Kangaskolkka	IFK Mariehamn	16
2	(Cameroon) Tuco	Ilves	15
2	(Slovenia) Filip Valenčič	HJK	15
4	(Finland) Akseli Pelvas	HJK	14
5	(North Macedonia) Marko Simonovski	FC Lahti	13
6	(England) Billy Ions	SJK	12
7	(Cameroon) Gaël Etock	JJK	11
7	(Colombia) Alfredo Morelos	HJK	11
9	(Finland) Pekka Sihvola	HIFK	10
10	(Finland) Timo Furuholm	FC Inter	9
10	(Brazil) Stênio	FC Lahti	9
10	(Finland) Benjamin Källman	FC Inter	9
10	(Nigeria) Gbolahan Salami	KuPS	9
10	(Finland) Urho Nissilä	KuPS	9

== Awards ==
Month	Coach of the Month	Player of the Month
April	(Finland) Mika Lehkosuo (HJK)	(Colombia) Alfredo Morelos (HJK)
May	(Finland) Jani Honkavaara (KuPS)	(Colombia) Alfredo Morelos (HJK)
June	(Finland) Mika Lehkosuo (HJK)	(Slovenia) Filip Valenčič (PS Kemi)
July	(Finland) Toni Korkeakunnas (FC Lahti)	(Finland) Santeri Hostikka (FC Lahti)
August	(Finland) Jarkko Wiss (Ilves)	(Finland) Akseli Pelvas (HJK)

=== Annual awards ===
Award	Winner	Club
Player of the Year	(Slovenia) Filip Valenčič	HJK
Goalkeeper of the Year	(Russia) Aleksandr Vasyutin	Lahti
Defender of the Year	(Finland) Juha Pirinen	HJK
Midfielder of the Year	(Ghana) Anthony Annan	HJK
Striker of the Year	(Slovenia) Filip Valenčič	HJK
Breakthrough of the Year	(Finland) Kaan Kairinen	Inter Turku
Coach of the Year	(Finland) Mika Lehkosuo	HJK

=== Team of the Year ===

Team of the Year
Goalkeeper	(Russia) Aleksandr Vasjutin (Lahti)			
Defence	(Finland) Albin Granlund (Mariehamn)	(Finland) Hannu Patronen (HJK)	(Ivory Coast) Hamed Coulibaly (KuPS)	(Finland) Juha Pirinen (HJK)
Midfield	(Finland) Rasmus Karjalainen (PS Kemi)	(Ghana) Anthony Annan (HJK)	(Slovenia) Filip Valenčič (HJK)	(Finland) Santeri Hostikka (Lahti)
Attack	(Finland) Aleksei Kangaskolkka (Mariehamn)		(Cameroon) Ariel Ngueukam (Ilves)	

== Attendances ==
No.	Club	Average	Change	Highest
1	HJK	4,779	−6.3%	10,500
2	Ilves	3,462	+3.3%	5,050
3	HIFK	3,162	−12.9%	10,500
4	SJK	2,990	−3.7%	4,023
5	KuPS	2,724	+29.9%	4,432
6	Lahti	2,469	+20.3%	4,099
7	VPS	2,248	−23.4%	3,123
8	Inter Turku	2,235	−0.9%	3,512
9	RoPS	1,566	−11.2%	2,921
10	JJK	1,559	−10.2%	2,346
11	Mariehamn	1,304	−13.2%	2,207
12	Kemi	1,125	−27.4%	3,325
