= FC Åland =

Finnish football club

- Full name: Football Club Åland
- Founded: 1992
- Chairman: Daniel Melander
Home colours	Away colours

FC Åland is a football club registered in Sund, Åland with area of operations in the north of Åland which includes also Finström, Saltvik, Geta, Vårdö. The club was formed originally in 1992 by Ålands Fotbollförbund but was taken over by 4 clubs in 2012. IFFK and Sunds IF (SIF) had merged their men´s teams into SIFFK around 2009 and the club reached its present form in 2012, when Hammarlands IK and IF Fram merged their men's first teams with SIFFK and took the name FC Åland. The first team mostly played in the fourth-tier of football in Finland but also played in the third-tier in 2016. At the end of the 2023 season they announced that they would shut down their senior team to focus on their youth teams. Their place in Kolmonen was taken over by IFK Mariehamn.
