= Football in Åland =

Football in Åland is governed by the Åland Football Association (ÅFF), which was founded in 1943. ÅFF is a member of Football Association of Finland.

Åland has 11 football clubs across different levels, ages, and genders. Åland even has its own national teams, Åland official football team and Åland women's official football team, despite not being a fully sovereign state or having membership to UEFA or FIFA. Åland women's team won the 2011 Island Games women's football tournament on the Isle of Wight.

Football clubs of Åland play in leagues and competitions of Finland and Sweden. As of 2025, IFK Mariehamn plays in the Finnish men's premier league Veikkausliiga and Åland United plays in the Finnish women's top division Kansallainen Liiga.

== Men's football clubs ==
=== Finnish football league system ===
- IFK Mariehamn - Veikkausliiga (Tier 1)
- IFK Mariehamn II - Kolmonen, Läntinen (Tier 5)
- Jomala IK – Vitonen, SPL Turku district (Tier 7)

== Women's football clubs ==
=== Finnish football league system ===
- Åland United – Kansallinen Liiga (Tier 1)
- IFK Mariehamn - Naisten Kolmonen, SPL Turku district (Tier 4)

=== Swedish football league system ===
- Jomala IK – Division 5, Uppland östra (Tier 7)

== Ålandscupen ==
The Ålandscupen was an annual cup competition administered by the ÅFF that was first introduced in 1943.

== Youth football ==
The Åland FA organises a mini-league called ‘Poolspel’ for players of all genders from 6 – 12 years old.

== Notable players from Åland ==
- Anders Eriksson
- Jani Lyyski
- Annica Sjölund
- Daniel Sjölund
- Tommy Wirtanen
- Joel Mattsson
- Oscar Wiklöf
- Mikael Granskog
- Michael Fonsell
- Leo Andersson
- Wille Nuñez
- Arvid Lundberg (footballer)
- Thomas Mäkinen
- Joel Karlström
