= Wiklöf =

Wiklöf is a surname which is mostly used in Nordic countries. People with the surname include:

- Lasse Wiklöf (1944–2008), Finnish politician
- Mattias Wiklöf (born 1979), Swedish football player
- Oscar Wiklöf (born January 2003), Finnish football player
