= 2022 Veikkausliiga =

2022 football season in Finland

Veikkausliiga
- Season: 2022
- Dates: 2 April – 30 November 2022
- Champions: HJK
- Relegated: HIFK
- Champions League: HJK
- Conference League: KuPS; Honka; Haka
- Matches: 74
- Goals: 207 (2.8 per match)
- Top goalscorer: Lee Erwin (20 goals)
- Biggest home win: Honka 5–1 SJK (25 April 2022); Inter Turku 4–0 Mariehamn (29 April 2022); Inter Turku 5–1 Lahti (22 June 2022)
- Biggest away win: Oulu 0–6 VPS (2 July 2022)
- Highest scoring: Honka 5–1 SJK (25 April 2022); HIFK 1–5 VPS (18 June 2022); Inter Turku 5–1 Lahti (22 June 2022); Oulu 0–6 VPS (2 July 2022)
- Longest winning run: 5 matches KuPS
- Longest unbeaten run: 10 matches KuPS
- Longest winless run: 10 matches HIFK
- Longest losing run: 5 matches SJK
- All statistics correct as of 2 July 2022.

The 2022 Veikkausliiga was the 92nd season of top-tier football in Finland. HJK won the championship for the third consecutive season.

== Teams ==
KTP (relegated after one year in the top flight) were relegated to Ykkönen after finishing at the bottom of the 2021 season. Their place was taken by Ykkönen champions VPS (promoted after a two-year absence).

=== Stadia and locations ===
Location of teams in 2022 Veikkausliiga

Club	Location	Stadium	Turf	Capacity
AC Oulu	Oulu	Raatti Stadion	Natural	4,392
FC Haka	Valkeakoski	Tehtaan kenttä	Artificial	3,516
FC Honka	Espoo	Tapiolan Urheilupuisto	Natural	6,000
FC Inter	Turku	Veritas Stadion	Natural	9,372
FC Lahti	Lahti	Lahden Stadion	Natural	7,465
HIFK	Helsinki	Bolt Arena	Artificial	10,770
HJK	Helsinki	Bolt Arena	Artificial	10,770
IFK Mariehamn	Mariehamn	Wiklöf Holding Arena	Artificial	4,000
Ilves	Tampere	Tampere Stadium	Natural	16,800
KuPS	Kuopio	Savon Sanomat Areena	Artificial	5,000
SJK	Seinäjoki	OmaSP Stadion	Artificial	6,000
VPS	Vaasa	Hietalahti	Artificial	6,005

=== Personnel and kits ===
Note: Flags indicate national team as has been defined under FIFA eligibility rules. Players and Managers may hold more than one non-FIFA nationality.

Team	Manager	Captain	Manufacturer	Shirt sponsor(s)
AC Oulu	(Finland) Jyrki Ahola	(Finland) Lassi Nurmos	Craft	Go On Oulu / Codemate / Oulun Energia
FC Haka	(Finland) Teemu Tainio	(United States) Jacob Bushue	Puma	Volkswagen
FC Honka	(Finland) Vesa Vasara	(Finland) Duarte Tammilehto	Puma	Volkswagen
FC Inter	(Spain) Miguel Grau	(Finland) Timo Furuholm	Nike	Alfons Håkans
FC Lahti	(Finland) Ilir Zeneli	(Finland) Kari Arkivuo	Umbro	Halton / Oomi / Green Lahti
HIFK	(Finland) Mixu Paatelainen	(Finland) Sakari Mattila	Puma	Aktia Bank
HJK	(Finland) Toni Koskela	(Finland) Daniel O'Shaughnessy	Adidas	Apu
IFK Mariehamn	(Sweden) Daniel Norrmén	(Finland) Timi Lahti	Puma	Åland / Arkipelag
Ilves	(Finland) Toni Kallio	(Finland) Tuure Siira	Adidas	Pohjola Rakennus / Avant Tecno / Pihlajalinna / NYQS Oy
KuPS	(Finland) Simo Valakari	(Ghana) Nana Boateng	Puma	Pohjola Sairaala (home) / LähiTapiola (away)
SJK	(Spain) Joaquín Gómez	(Finland) Mehmet Hetemaj	Adidas	LähiTapiola / Oma Säästöpankki / Elisa
VPS	(Finland) Jussi Nuorela	(Finland) Sebastian Strandvall	Nike	

== Regular season ==
=== League table ===
Pos	Team	Pld	W	D	L	GF	GA	GD	Pts	Qualification
1	HJK	22	15	4	3	34	18	+16	49	Qualification for the Championship round
2	KuPS	22	14	5	3	36	16	+20	47	Qualification for the Championship round
3	Honka	22	12	5	5	45	21	+24	41	Qualification for the Championship round
4	Haka	22	11	4	7	36	38	−2	37	Qualification for the Championship round
5	Inter Turku	22	9	5	8	40	28	+12	32	Qualification for the Championship round
6	SJK	22	9	4	9	29	32	−3	31	Qualification for the Championship round
7	Oulu	22	8	6	8	35	35	0	30	Qualification for the Relegation round
8	Ilves	22	6	7	9	31	36	−5	25	Qualification for the Relegation round
9	Mariehamn	22	6	6	10	25	33	−8	24	Qualification for the Relegation round
10	VPS	22	6	4	12	39	36	+3	22	Qualification for the Relegation round
11	Lahti	22	4	6	12	19	43	−24	18	Qualification for the Relegation round
12	HIFK	22	1	6	15	15	48	−33	9	Qualification for the Relegation round

Updated to match(es) played on 11 September 2022. Source: https://us.soccerway.com/national/finland/veikkausliiga/2022/regular-season/r66785/
Rules for classification: 1) Points; 2) Goal difference; 3) Goals scored; 4) Head-to-head points; 5) Head-to-head goal difference; 6) Head-to-head away goals scored; 7) Play-off
(Note: Play-off is only played if need to decide champion, teams for relegation or UEFA competition and will be played on a neutral ground).

== Results ==
Home \ Away	HAK	HFK	HJK	HON	ILV	INT	KPS	LAH	MAR	OUL	SJK	VPS
Haka	—	2–1	0–3	2–1	2–1	3–2	2–1	1–1	3–2	3–2	1–1	0–2
HIFK	0–2	—	0–2	1–2	0–1	0–3	0–1	0–3	1–1	1–6	0–2	1–5
HJK	4–1	2–1	—	1–0	2–1	1–4	1–1	3–2	1–0	0–1	1–0	3–1
Honka	3–2	4–1	1–2	—	0–0	2–1	2–0	5–0	1–1	2–2	5–1	4–0
Ilves	2–3	0–1	1–2	0–4	—	1–1	1–2	3–2	1–0	0–2	3–1	3–2
Inter Turku	0–2	2–2	0–1	0–1	2–2	—	1–2	5–1	4–0	2–1	1–0	1–1
KuPS	2–1	5–1	0–0	1–1	0–0	2–1	—	4–0	1–0	2–1	2–0	3–1
Lahti	0–1	0–0	1–1	0–2	1–1	2–1	0–1	—	0–2	0–2	1–3	0–5
Mariehamn	2–0	1–1	2–1	1–1	1–5	2–3	1–1	0–0	—	2–1	2–0	1–3
Oulu	3–0	1–1	1–1	2–1	2–2	1–0	0–3	0–0	3–1	—	1–0	0–6
SJK	2–2	2–1	0–1	3–2	3–3	1–1	2–1	1–2	1–0	3–2	—	2–0
VPS	3–3	1–1	0–1	0–1	3–0	1–2	0–1	2–3	1–3	2–2	0–1	—

Updated to match(es) played on 11 September 2022. Source: Flashscore
Legend: Blue = home team win; Yellow = draw; Red = away team win.

== Championship round ==
Pos	Team	Pld	W	D	L	GF	GA	GD	Pts	Qualification	HJK	KPS	HON	HAK	INT	SJK
1	HJK (C, Q)	27	18	4	5	41	23	+18	58	Qualification for the Champions League first qualifying round	—	0–1	—	—	3–0	2–1
2	KuPS (Q)	27	17	6	4	43	21	+22	57	Qualification for the Europa Conference League second qualifying round	—	—	3–2	0–0	2–0	—
3	Honka (Q)	27	14	7	6	53	27	+26	49	Qualification for the Europa Conference League first qualifying round	3–1	—	—	1–1	2–1	—
4	Haka (O)	27	13	6	8	40	40	0	45	Qualification for the national Europa Conference League play-offs.	0–1	—	—	—	—	2–0
5	Inter Turku	27	10	5	12	42	36	+6	35	Qualification for the national Europa Conference League play-offs.	—	—	—	0–1	—	1–0
6	SJK	27	10	5	12	33	38	−5	35	Qualification for the national Europa Conference League play-offs.	—	3–1	0–0	—	—	—

Source: Flashscore
Legend: Blue = home team win; Yellow = draw; Red = away team win.
Rules for classification: 1) Points; 2) Goal difference; 3) Goals scored; 4) Head-to-head points; 5) Head-to-head goal difference; 6) Head-to-head away goals scored; 7) Play-off
(Note: Play-off is only played if need to decide champion, teams for relegation or UEFA competition and will be played on a neutral ground).
(C) Champions; (O) Play-off winners; (Q) Qualified for the phase indicated

== Relegation round ==
Pos	Team	Pld	W	D	L	GF	GA	GD	Pts	Qualification	OUL	VPS	ILV	MAR	LAH	HFK
7	Oulu	27	11	6	10	46	43	+3	39	Qualification for the national Europa Conference League play-offs.	—	—	0–2	—	2–1	4–1
8	VPS	27	10	5	12	52	41	+11	35	Qualification for the national Europa Conference League play-offs.	2–1	—	—	—	—	4–0
9	Ilves	27	9	7	11	43	43	0	34		—	2–3	—	2–3	1–0	—
10	Mariehamn	27	9	7	11	41	43	−2	34		2–4	2–2	—	—	6–0	—
11	Lahti (O)	27	5	6	16	26	55	−29	21	Qualification for the relegation play-offs	—	0–2	—	—	—	6–1
12	HIFK (R)	27	1	6	20	20	70	−50	9	Relegation to Ykkönen	—	—	1–5	2–3	—	—

Source: Soccerway
Legend: Blue = home team win; Yellow = draw; Red = away team win.
Rules for classification: 1) Points; 2) Goal difference; 3) Goals scored; 4) Head-to-head points; 5) Head-to-head goal difference; 6) Head-to-head away goals scored; 7) Play-off
(Note: Play-off is only played if need to decide champion, teams for relegation or UEFA competition and will be played on a neutral ground).
(O) Play-off winners; (R) Relegated

== Europa Conference League play-offs ==
Quarter-finals
19 October 2022
6 SJK	0
7 Oulu	1
19 October 2022
5 Inter Turku	1
8 VPS	5

Semi-final
22 October 2022
7 Oulu	0
8 VPS (a.e.t.)	1

Final
26 and 30 October 2022
8 VPS	0	2	2
4 Haka	3	1	4

=== Quarter-finals ===
19 October 2022
18:00 EEST

Inter Turku	1–5	VPS
Niska 81'		Alanko 37'; Kuittinen 48' (o.g.); Multanen 66'; Hudd 77'; Niemi 85'

Veritas Stadion, Turku
Attendance: 1,052
Referee: Ville Nevalainen
19 October 2022
18:00 EEST

SJK	0–1	Oulu
		Karjalainen 59'

OmaSP Stadion, Seinäjoki
Attendance: 1,698
Referee: Mohammad Al-Emara

=== Semifinal ===
22 October 2022
17:00 EEST

Oulu	0–1 (a.e.t.)	VPS
		Jääskä 108'

Raatti Stadium, Oulu
Attendance: 1,091
Referee: Joni Hyytiä

=== Final ===
==== First leg ====
26 October 2022
18:00 EEST

VPS	0–3	Haka
		Erwin 5', 28', 43' (pen.)

Hietalahti Stadium, Vaasa

==== Second leg ====
30 October 2022
15:00 EET

Haka	1–2	VPS
Sihvonen 30'		Räisänen 13'; Vahtera 73'

Tehtaan kenttä, Valkeakoski

== Relegation play-offs ==
Ykkönen playoff semifinal
12 Oktober 2022
3 FF Jaro	2
4 Ekenäs IF	1

Ykkönen playoff final
17 Oktober 2022
2 TPS	4
3 FF Jaro	0

Promotion/relegation playoff final
20 & 23 Oktober 2022
2 TPS	1	1	2
11 Lahti	1	2	3

=== Ykkönen playoff semifinals ===
12 October 2022
18:30 EEST

FF Jaro	2–1	Ekenäs IF
Brunell 19'; Bushue 27'	Report	Efimov 25'

Jakobstads Centralplan, Jakobstad
Referee: Petri Viljanen

=== Ykkönen playoff finals ===
17 October 2022
18:30 EEST

TPS	4–0	FF Jaro
Jakonen 17', 48'; Roiha 27'; Rantanen 81'

Veritas Stadion, Turku
Attendance: 2,389
Referee: Dennis Antamo

=== Promotion/relegation play-off final ===
==== First leg ====
20 October 2022
18:30 EEST

TPS	1–1	FC Lahti
Pakkanen 72'		Hertsi 26'

Veritas Stadion, Turku
Attendance: 2,621
Referee: Peiman Simani

==== Second leg ====
23 October 2022
17:00 EEST

FC Lahti	2–1	TPS
Zeqiri 10' (pen.); Penninkangas 90+1'		Kinnunen 89'

Lahti Stadium, Lahti
Referee: Oliver Reitala

== Statistics ==
=== Top goalscorers ===
As of 30 October 2022

Rank	Player	Club	Goals
1	(Scotland) Lee Erwin	Haka	20
2	(Finland) Kalle Multanen	VPS	15
3	(Finland) Agon Sadiku	Honka	14
4	(Nigeria) John Owoeri	Mariehamn	11
4	(Finland) Tim Väyrynen	KuPS	11
6	(Argentina) Michael López	Oulu	10
6	(Finland) Kai Meriluoto	Ilves	10
8	(Brazil) Dé	Mariehamn	9
8	(Finland) Petteri Pennanen	Ilves	9
10	(Latvia) Jānis Ikaunieks	KuPS	8
10	(Serbia) Bojan Radulović	HJK	8

== Awards ==
=== Annual awards ===
Award	Winner	Club
Player of the Year	(Scotland) Lee Erwin	Haka
Goalkeeper of the Year	(Northern Ireland) Conor Hazard	HJK
Defender of the Year	(Brazil) Paulo Ricardo	KuPS
Midfielder of the Year	(Finland) Petteri Pennanen	Ilves
Striker of the Year	(Scotland) Lee Erwin	Haka
Breakthrough of the Year	(Finland) Agon Sadiku	Honka
Coach of the Year	(Finland) Toni Koskela	HJK

=== Team of the Year ===

Team of the Year
Goalkeeper	(Austria) Johannes Kreidl (KuPS)			
Defence	(Finland) Henri Toivomäki (KuPS)	(Finland) Miro Tenho (HJK)	(Brazil) Paulo Ricardo (KuPS)	(Colombia) Luis Carlos Murillo (HJK)
Midfield	(Portugal) Rui Modesto (Honka)	(Finland) Anton Popovitch (KuPS)	(Latvia) Jānis Ikaunieks (KuPS)	(Finland) Otso Liimatta (Oulu)
Attack	(Scotland) Lee Erwin (Haka)		(Finland) Agon Sadiku (Honka)	

=== Attendance ===
Pos	Team	Total	High	Low	Average	Change
1	HJK	8,096	4,650	3,446	4,048	+164.6%
2	HIFK	9,565	7,103	1,212	3,188	+169.5%
3	SJK	4,432	2,358	2,074	2,216	+28.3%
4	KuPS	5,394	2,336	1,394	1,798	−17.7%
5	VPS	3,524	2,286	1,238	1,762	+100.5%^{†}
6	Haka	3,250	2,240	1,010	1,625	+36.6%
7	Ilves	3,941	1,844	234	1,314	−28.1%
8	FC Lahti	3,561	1,467	786	1,187	+28.5%
9	FC Inter	2,652	2,122	224	884	−38.0%
10	IFK Mariehamn	2,193	857	614	731	−0.7%
11	AC Oulu	1,320	1,086	234	660	−50.0%
12	FC Honka	672	340	332	336	−31.4%
	League total	48,600	7,103	224	1,301	−19.7%

Updated to games played on 27 April 2022
Notes:
^{†} Promoted from Ykkönen 2021
