= Macario Hing-Glover =

American soccer player (born 1995)

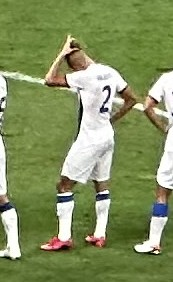
- Hing-Glover in August 2023

Personal information
- Full name: Macario Darwin Yen Hing-Glover
- Date of birth: April 4, 1995 (age 31)
- Place of birth: Phoenix, Arizona, United States
- Height: 1.82 m (6 ft 0 in)
- Position: Right-back

Youth career
- 2013–2014: San Jose Earthquakes

College career
Years	Team	Apps	(Gls)
2014–2016	Duke Blue Devils	31	(4)

Senior career*
Years	Team	Apps	(Gls)
2016	Burlingame Dragons	1	(0)
2017	Istra 1961	0	(0)
2018	Krško	21	(0)
2019	Spartak Trnava	6	(0)
2019–2022	HIFK	51	(1)
2023	SJK	0	(0)
2023	Shanghai Shenhua	27	(0)
- * Club domestic league appearances and goals as of 13 November 2023

Macario Darwin Yen Hing-Glover (born 4 April 1995), known in China as Yan Xinli (Chinese: 晏新力), is an American former soccer player who last played for Chinese Super League club Shanghai Shenhua as a right-back.

== Club career ==
Hing-Glover played for NK Istra 1961 in Croatian First Football League.

He signed for NK Krško in February 2018, eventually leaving the club in December 2018.

After a three-year stint in Finland with HIFK in Veikkausliiga, Hing-Glover signed with fellow Veikkausliiga side SJK ahead of the 2023 season. However, on 20 March 2023, Hing-Glover joined Chinese Super League club Shanghai Shenhua for an undisclosed fee.

On 30 December 2024, Hing-Glover announced his retirement from professional football through social media.

== Career statistics ==
As of 23 October 2024.

Appearances and goals by club, season and competition
Club	Season	League			Cup (Note: Includes Croatian Cup, Slovenian Cup, Slovak Cup, Suomen Cup and Chinese FA Cup)		League cup (Note: Includes Finnish League Cup)		Total	
Club	Season	Division	Apps	Goals	Apps	Goals	Apps	Goals	Apps	Goals
Istra 1961	2017–18	1. HNL	0	0	1	0	–		1	0
Krško	2017–18	Slovenian PrvaLiga	8	0	–		–		8	0
Krško	2018–19	Slovenian PrvaLiga	11	0	2	0	–		13	0
Krško	Total		19	0	2	0	0	0	21	0
Spartak Trnava	2018–19	Slovak Super Liga	5	0	1	0	–		6	0
HIFK	2019	Veikkausliiga	10	0	–		–		10	0
HIFK	2020	Veikkausliiga	0	0	5	0	–		5	0
HIFK	2021	Veikkausliiga	20	0	5	0	–		25	0
HIFK	2022	Veikkausliiga	21	1	4	0	4	0	29	1
HIFK	Total		51	1	14	0	4	0	69	1
SJK Seinäjoki	2023	Veikkausliiga	0	0	0	0	5	0	5	0
Shanghai Shenhua	2023	Chinese Super League	27	0	2	0	–		29	0
Career total			102	1	20	0	9	0	131	1

== Honors ==
Spartak Trnava

- Slovak Cup: 2018–19

Shanghai Shenhua

- Chinese FA Cup: 2023

Individual

- Veikkausliiga Team of the Year: 2021
