= Jimmy Wargh =

Finnish football manager and a former player (born 1976)

Personal information
- Full name: Jimmy Jan-Anders Wargh
- Date of birth: 9 April 1976 (age 50)
- Place of birth: Jakobstad, Finland
- Height: 1.76 m (5 ft 9 in)
- Position: Midfielder

Team information
- Current team: IFK Mariehamn (club director)

Youth career
- Pedersöre FF
- Jaro

Senior career*
Years	Team	Apps	(Gls)
1994–1997	Jaro	35	(2)
1995	→ GBK (loan)	6	(0)
1998–2000	Skjetten	25	(3)
2001–2008	Jaro	169	(19)
2007–2008	→ JBK	6	(0)
2008	→ GBK (loan)	12	(2)
2009–2010	IFK Jakobstad	36	(34)
2011	Pedersöre FF		

Managerial career
- 2016–2019: Jaro (youth)
- 2020: JBK
- 2021–2022: Jaro
- 2023: IFK Mariehamn (assistant)
- 2023: IFK Mariehamn
- 2024–: IFK Mariehamn (club director)
- * Club domestic league appearances and goals as of 2 April 2024

Jimmy Jan-Anders Wargh (born 9 April 1976) is a Finnish football executive, football manager and a former player who played as a midfielder. He is currently the CEO and the club director of Veikkausliiga club IFK Mariehamn, which he previously coached.

== Playing career ==
Wargh started football in youth teams of local clubs Pedersöre FF and FF Jaro in Pietarsaari. As a senior player, he played mostly for Jaro first team, but also represented GBK Kokkola, Jakobstads BK and Skjetten in Norway. Prior to his retirement after the 2008 season, Wargh had made a total of 179 appearances in Finnish top-tier Veikkausliiga with Jaro, scoring 15 goals.

== Coaching career ==
Wargh has worked as a youth coach for Jaro in 2016–2019. He has also coached JBK in lower divisions and Jaro in second-tier Ykkönen in 2021–2022.

For the 2023 Veikkausliiga season, Wargh joined the coaching team of Daniel Norrmén in Veikkausliiga club IFK Mariehamn. After the dismissal of Norrmén in August 2023, Wargh was appointed the manager of IFK Mariehamn for the rest of the season. It was also announced that he will start as the club's chief executive officer and club director in the 2024 season, after the retirement of long-term club president Peter Mattsson.

== Personal life ==
His son Marcel is a footballer for Jakobstads BK and his brother Mattias Wargh has also played football. They are Swedish-speaking Finns.

== Career statistics ==
As of 26 February 2025

Appearances and goals by club, season and competition
Club	Season	League			Other		Total	
Club	Season	Division	Apps	Goals	Apps	Goals	Apps	Goals
Jaro	1994	Veikkausliiga	8	0	–		8	0
Jaro	1995	Veikkausliiga	1	0	–		1	0
Jaro	1996	Veikkausliiga	3	0	1 (Note: Appearance(s) in UEFA Intertoto Cup)	0	4	0
Jaro	1997	Veikkausliiga	23	2	–		23	2
Jaro	Total		35	2	1	0	36	2
GBK Kokkola (loan)	1995	Ykkönen	6	0	–		6	0
Skjetten	1998	2. divisjon	9	3	–		9	3
Skjetten	1999	1. divisjon	13	0	–		13	0
Skjetten	2000	2. divisjon	3	0	2 (Note: Appearances in Norwegian Cup)	0	5	0
Skjetten	Total		25	3	2	0	27	3
Jaro	2001	Ykkönen	25	6	–		25	6
Jaro	2002	Veikkausliiga	27	1	–		27	1
Jaro	2003	Veikkausliiga	26	5	–		26	5
Jaro	2004	Veikkausliiga	19	1	–		19	1
Jaro	2005	Veikkausliiga	24	2	–		24	2
Jaro	2006	Veikkausliiga	22	4	–		22	4
Jaro	2007	Veikkausliiga	18	0	–		18	0
Jaro	2008	Veikkausliiga	8	0	–		8	0
Jaro	Total		169	19	0	0	169	19
Jakobstads BK	2007	Kakkonen	6	0	–		6	0
GBK Kokkola (loan)	2008	Kakkonen	12	2	–		12	2
Career total			253	26	3	0	256	26
