= Oscar Wiklöf =

Finnish footballer (born 2003)

Personal information
- Date of birth: 29 January 2003 (age 23)
- Place of birth: Mariehamn, Finland
- Height: 1.87 m (6 ft 2 in)
- Position: Midfielder

Team information
- Current team: SC Freiburg II
- Number: 26

Youth career
- 2008–2021: IFK Mariehamn

Senior career*
Years	Team	Apps	(Gls)
2019–2022	IFK Mariehamn	15	(0)
2019	→ JIK (loan)	2	(0)
2020–2022	→ Åland (loan)	13	(5)
2022–	SC Freiburg II	79	(12)

International career^{‡}
2021	Finland U20	1	(0)
- * Club domestic league appearances and goals as of 19 May 2026 ‡ National team caps and goals as of 00:00, 14 November 2021 (UTC)

Oscar Wiklöf (born 29 January 2003) is a Finnish professional footballer who plays as a midfielder for SC Freiburg II in German Regionalliga Südwest.

== Club career ==
=== IFK Mariehamn ===
Wiklöf was born in Mariehamn, Åland, the autonomous region of Finland. He started playing football in the IFK Mariehamn organisation at the age of 5, and made his senior debut in 2019 with the club's associate team Jomala IK (JIK), playing in the fourth-tier league Kolmonen. He made his debut in the premier division Veikkausliiga for IFK Mariehamn first team in 2021.

=== SC Freiburg ===
In July 2022, Wiklöf signed with 3. Liga club SC Freiburg II on a two-year deal for an undisclosed fee, following a trial with a team. He made his debut in 3. Liga on 1 October 2022, in a 2–2 draw against 1. FC Saarbrücken, after being substituted on the 61st minute, and scoring a goal one minute later. Wiklöf played in a total of 24 games in the 2022–23 season, scoring three times and providing three assists.

In August 2023, Wiklöf suffered a surgery-requiring thigh injury, and was ruled out for months. He eventually missed almost the whole season.

== Career statistics ==
As of 19 May 2026

Appearances and goals by club, season and competition
Club	Season	League			National cup (Note: Includes Finnish Cup)		League cup (Note: Includes Finnish League Cup)		Europe		Total	
Club	Season	Division	Apps	Goals	Apps	Goals	Apps	Goals	Apps	Goals	Apps	Goals
Jomala IK	2019	Kolmonen	2	0	—		—		—		2	0
Åland	2020	Kolmonen	1	0	—		—		—		1	0
Åland	2021	Kolmonen	9	3	—		—		—		9	3
Åland	2022	Kolmonen	3	2	—		—		—		3	2
Åland	Total		13	5	0	0	0	0	0	0	13	5
IFK Mariehamn	2021	Veikkausliiga	9	0	—		—		—		9	0
IFK Mariehamn	2022	Veikkausliiga	6	0	1	0	3	0	—		10	0
IFK Mariehamn	Total		15	0	1	0	3	0	0	0	19	0
SC Freiburg II	2022–23	3. Liga	24	3	—		—		—		24	3
SC Freiburg II	2023–24	3. Liga	2	0	—		—		—		2	0
SC Freiburg II	2024–25	Regionalliga Südwest	30	2	0	0	—		—		30	2
SC Freiburg II	2025–26	Regionalliga Südwest	23	7	0	0	—		—		23	7
SC Freiburg II	Total		79	12	0	0	0	0	0	0	79	12
Career total			109	17	1	0	3	0	0	0	113	17

== Honours ==
SC Freiburg II

- 3. Liga runner-up: 2022–23

Individual

- Åland Football Association: Boy Player of the Year (Silverbollen) 2021, 2022
