= Ålandscupen =

- Genre: sporting event
- Date: northern summer
- Frequency: annual
- Location: Åland
- Country: Finland
- Inaugurated: 1943; 83 years ago

Ålandscupen (English: The Åland Cup) is a local football competition for Åland which is administered by the ÅFF. The cup competition was first introduced in 1943 and continues to be dominated by IFK Mariehamn who have won the Ålandscupen 42 times.

== Finals ==
Year	Winners	Runners-up	Result
1943	IFK Mariehamn	Hammarlands IK	4–2
1944	IFK Mariehamn	Bollklubben -40	
1945	Bollklubben -40	IFK Mariehamn	3–2
1946	IFK Mariehamn	Bollklubben -40	3–2
1947	IFK Mariehamn		
1948			
1949	IFK Mariehamn	IF Fram	3–0
1950	IF Fram	IFK Mariehamn	3–1
1951	IFK Mariehamn	IFFK	5–2
1952	IFK Mariehamn	IFFK	3–0
1953	IF Fram	IFFK	4–3
1954	IFFK	IFK Mariehamn	2–1
1955	IFFK	IFK Mariehamn	4–0
1956	IFK Mariehamn	IFFK	4–3
1957	IFK Mariehamn	IFK Mariehamn 2	5–0
1958	IFK Mariehamn	IFFK	3–2
1959	IFK Mariehamn	IFFK	3–2
1960	IFFK	IFK Mariehamn	4–2
1961	IFFK		
1962	IFFK	IFK Mariehamn	2–0
1963	IFFK	IFK Mariehamn	5–4
1964	IFK Mariehamn	IFFK	3–2
1965	IFFK	Jomala IK	4–0
1966	IFFK	Hammarlands IK	4–2
1967	IF Fram	IFK Mariehamn	2–1
1968	IFK Mariehamn	IFFK	1–0
1969	IFFK	Hammarlands IK	2–1
1970	IFK Mariehamn	IFK Mariehamn 2	5–4
1971	IF Fram	IFK Mariehamn	1–0
1972	IFK Mariehamn	Hammarlands IK	2–0
1973	IFFK	IFK Mariehamn 2	3–1
1974	IFK Mariehamn	IFFK	5–0
1975	IFK Mariehamn	IFFK	4–3
1976	IFK Mariehamn	IFFK	6–4
1977	IFK Mariehamn	IFFK	4–3
1978	IFK Mariehamn	Jomala IK	4–1
1979	IF Östernäskamraterna	Jomala IK	2–1
1980	IFK Mariehamn	IFFK	3–0
1981	IFK Mariehamn	Jomala IK	7–0
1982	IFK Mariehamn	Jomala IK	2–0
1983	Jomala IK	Sunds IF	4–1
1984	IFK Mariehamn	IFFK	5–0
1985	IFK Mariehamn	IFFK	1–0
1986	IFFK	IFK Mariehamn	2–1
1987	Sunds IF	Jomala IK	2–1
1988	IFK Mariehamn	IFK Mariehamn vet.	3–2
1989	IFK Mariehamn	IFFK	3–1
1990	IFFK	Sunds IF	5–2
1991	IFFK	Jomala IK	4–2
1992	Jomala IK	IFK Mariehamn	2–1
1993	IFFK	Jomala IK	3–1
1994	IFK Mariehamn	Sunds IF	1–0
1995	IFK Mariehamn	Team Åland	6–2
1996	IFK Mariehamn	Hammarlands IK	3–2
1997	IFK Mariehamn	Sunds IF	2–1
1998	IFK Mariehamn	Hammarlands IK	2–1
1999	IFK Mariehamn	Hammarlands IK	4–0
2000	IFK Mariehamn	IFK Mariehamn vet.	6–0
2001	IFK Mariehamn	Hammarlands IK	4–1
2002	IFK Mariehamn	IFFK	2–1
2003	IFK Mariehamn	IFFK	5–0
2004	IFK Mariehamn	IFK Mariehamn vet.	2–1
2005	IFK Mariehamn	Hammarlands IK	7–0
2006	IFK Mariehamn	IFFK	2–0
2007	IFK Mariehamn	IFFK	2–1
2008	IFK Mariehamn	IFFK	5–1
2009	IFK Mariehamn	Jomala IK	9–4
2010	Hammarlands IK	IFK Mariehamn	3–2
2011	SIFFK	IFK Mariehamn	2–1
2012	IFK Mariehamn	SIFFK	3-1
