= Saira =

Saira may refer to:

== People ==
- Nikolas Saira (born 1999), Finnish footballer
- Saira Banu (born 1944), Indian film actress
- Saira Elizabeth Luiza Shah (1900–1960), Scottish writer
- Saira Shah (born 1964), author, reporter and documentary filmmaker
- Saira Khan (born 1970), runner-up on the first series of The Apprentice (Great Britain)
- Saira Mohan (born 1978), Canadian fashion model of Indian, French and Irish descent
- Saira Choudhry (born 1988), British actress
- Saira Blair (born 1996), American politician
- Saira Khan (actress), Pakistani actress
- Saira Peter, fFirst Pakistani opera singer
- Saira Posada (born 1998), Spanish footballer
- Saira Wasim (born 1975), Pakistani artist

== Other ==
- Cololabis saira, the scientific name of the Pacific saury fish
- Saira Batra, a character on the television series General Hospital: Night Shift
- Saira (character), the protagonist of the animated film Lesbian Space Princess (2025)
- Saira (film), a 2005 Malayalam-language Indian film starring Navya Nair and Nedumudi Venu
- Saira (video game), a computer game developed by Nifflas in 2009
