= Sayra =

Sayra is a given name. Notable people with the name include:

- Sayra DeVito (fl. 2024), American politician
- Sayra Fischer Lebenthal (1898–1994), American banker

== See also ==
- Saira
