= Anton Popovitch =

Finnish footballer (born 1996)

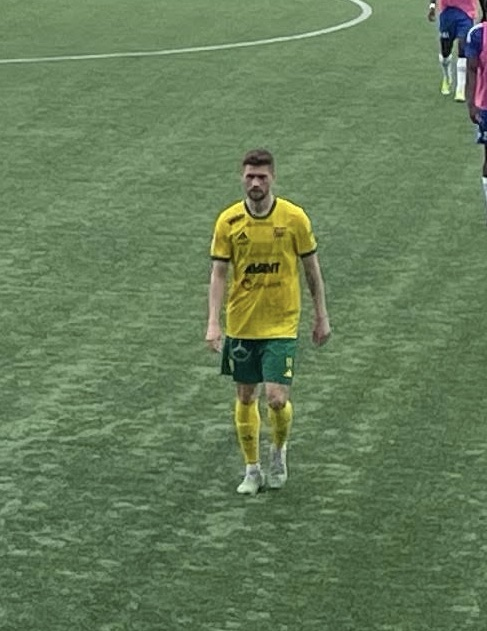
- Popovitch with Ilves in 2024

Personal information
- Date of birth: 11 July 1996 (age 30)
- Place of birth: Valkeakoski, Finland
- Height: 1.85 m (6 ft 1 in)
- Position: Midfielder

Team information
- Current team: Ilves
- Number: 14

Youth career
- –2015: Haka

Senior career*
Years	Team	Apps	(Gls)
2015–2020	Haka	134	(17)
2021–2023	KuPS	71	(6)
2024–	Ilves	77	(5)
Medal record
Haka
First place	Ykkönen	2019
KuPS
Second place	Veikkausliiga	2021
Second place	Veikkausliiga	2022
Second place	Veikkausliiga	2023
First place	Finnish Cup	2021
First place	Finnish Cup	2022
- * Club domestic league appearances and goals as of 13 November 2026

Anton Popovitch (Russian: Антон Попович; born 11 July 1996) is a Finnish professional footballer who plays as a midfielder for Veikkausliiga club Ilves.

== Club career ==
=== Haka ===
Born in Valkeakoski, Popovitch played in the youth sector of his hometown club Haka, before he was promoted to the club's senior squad for the 2015 season in the second-tier Ykkönen. After the 2019 season, which has been considered his breakthrough season, Haka won the Ykkönen title and earned a promotion back to Finland's premier league Veikkausliiga.

=== KuPS ===
Popovitch transferred to fellow Veikkausliiga club Kuopion Palloseura (KuPS) ahead of the 2021 season. He was named a vice-captain of his team in March 2022. Popovitch left the club after the 2023 season, after having spent three years with KuPS and having won two Finnish Cup titles and finished three times as Veikkausliiga runner-up. Popovitch also represented KuPS in the UEFA Europa Conference League qualifiers in his every season with the club.

=== Ilves ===
On 16 January 2024, fellow Veikkausliiga side Ilves announced the signing of Popovitch on a three-year deal. On 23 May 2024, Popovitch scored his first goal for Ilves in the league, in a 3–0 home win over Inter Turku. On 31 May 2024, in a home match against KuPS, Popovitch made his 100th appearance in Veikkausliiga. At the end of his first season with Ilves, the club finished as the league runner-up, falling two points short to KuPS. Popovitch was named in the Team of the Year, for the second time in his career after 2022.

== Personal life ==
Popovitch holds a dual Finnish-Russian citizenship. He is the son of former professional footballer Valeri Popovitch, who is the all-time leading goalscorer of Haka and of the whole Finnish top-tier league Veikkausliiga. His brother Sasha is also a footballer. Their mother is Finnish.

== Career statistics ==
As of 18 June 2025

Appearances and goals by club, season and competition
Club	Season	Division	League		National cup (Note: Includes Suomen Cup)		League cup		Europe		Total	
Club	Season	Division	Apps	Goals	Apps	Goals	Apps	Goals	Apps	Goals	Apps	Goals
FC Haka	2015	Ykkönen	18	2	3	0	—		—		21	2
FC Haka	2016	Ykkönen	18	0	4	0	—		—		22	0
FC Haka	2017	Ykkönen	26	1	5	0	—		—		31	1
FC Haka	2018	Ykkönen	25	5	4	1	—		—		29	6
FC Haka	2019	Ykkönen	27	7	5	0	—		—		32	7
FC Haka	2020	Veikkausliiga	20	2	8	1	—		—		28	3
FC Haka	Total		134	17	29	2	0	0	0	0	163	19
KuPS	2021	Veikkausliiga	25	3	6	1	—		8 (Note: Appearances in UEFA Europa Conference League)	0	39	4
KuPS	2022	Veikkausliiga	24	2	5	1	2	0	4	0	35	3
KuPS	2023	Veikkausliiga	22	1	2	0	6	0	1	0	31	1
KuPS	Total		71	6	13	2	8	0	13	0	105	8
Ilves	2024	Veikkausliiga	26	3	1	0	5	0	4	0	36	3
Ilves	2025	Veikkausliiga	11	1	1	0	5	0	0	0	17	1
Ilves	Total		37	4	2	0	10	0	4	0	53	4
Career total			242	27	44	4	18	0	17	0	250	31

== Honours ==
FC Haka

- Ykkönen: 2019

Kuopion Palloseura

- Veikkausliiga runner-up: 2021, 2022, 2023
- Finnish Cup: 2021, 2022

Ilves

- Veikkausliiga runner-up: 2024

Individual

- Veikkausliiga Team of the Year: 2022, 2024
- Ykkönen Player of the Month: May 2019
