= Tuure Siira =

Finnish footballer (born 1994)

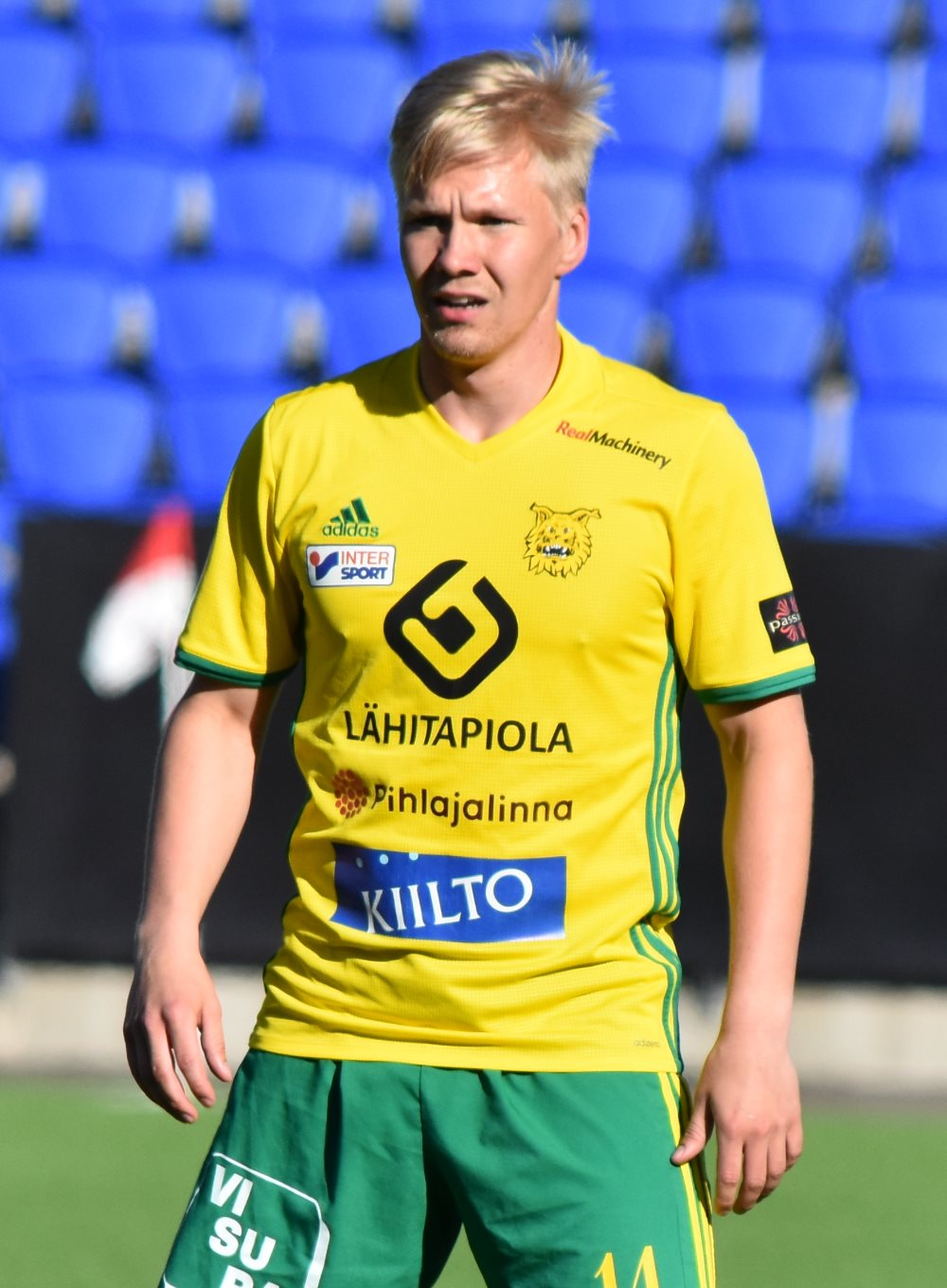
- Siira with Ilves in 2017

Personal information
- Date of birth: 25 October 1994 (age 32)
- Place of birth: Oulu, Finland
- Position: Midfielder

Team information
- Current team: Voska Sport

Senior career*
Years	Team	Apps	(Gls)
2011–2015	AC Oulu	108	(1)
2016–2022	Ilves	172	(6)
2023–2024	Haka	45	(1)
2025–	Voska Sport	0	(0)

International career
2013	Finland U19	1	(0)
- * Club domestic league appearances and goals as of 2 November 2024

Tuure Siira (born 25 October 1994) is a Finnish professional footballer who plays for Macedonian First League club Voska Sport, as a midfielder.

== Career ==
On 18 November 2022, Siira signed a two-year contract with Haka, beginning in the 2023 season.

In late December 2024, Siira signed with Voska Sport in Macedonian First League, starting in January 2025.

== Career statistics ==
As of 2 November 2024.

Appearances and goals by club, season and competition
Club	Season	League			Cup		League cup		Europe		Total	
Club	Season	Division	Apps	Goals	Apps	Goals	Apps	Goals	Apps	Goals	Apps	Goals
AC Oulu	2011	Ykkönen	12	0	0	0	2	0	–		14	0
AC Oulu	2012	Ykkönen	22	1	3	2	–		–		25	3
AC Oulu	2013	Ykkönen	23	0	1	0	–		–		24	0
AC Oulu	2014	Ykkönen	26	0	2	0	–		–		28	0
AC Oulu	2015	Ykkönen	24	0	5	0	–		–		29	0
AC Oulu	Total		107	1	11	2	2	0	0	0	120	3
Ilves	2016	Veikkausliiga	30	4	2	0	5	0	–		37	4
Ilves	2017	Veikkausliiga	28	0	6	1	–		–		34	1
Ilves	2018	Veikkausliiga	29	1	5	1	–		2 (Note: Appearances in UEFA Europa League)	0	36	2
Ilves	2019	Veikkausliiga	20	0	6	0	–		–		26	0
Ilves	2020	Veikkausliiga	21	0	7	0	–		1	0	29	0
Ilves	2021	Veikkausliiga	22	1	3	0	–		–		25	1
Ilves	2022	Veikkausliiga	22	0	1	0	3	0	–		26	0
Ilves	Total		172	6	30	2	8	0	3	0	213	8
Haka	2023	Veikkausliiga	22	1	1	0	5	0	1 (Note: Appearances in UEFA Conference League)	0	29	1
Haka	2024	Veikkausliiga	23	0	5	0	5	0	–		33	0
Haka	Total		45	1	6	0	10	0	1	0	62	1
Voska Sport	2024–25	Macedonian First League	0	0	0	0	–		–		0	0
Career total			324	8	47	4	20	0	4	0	395	12

== Honours ==
Ilves

- Finnish Cup: 2019
