= Agon Sadiku =

Finnish footballer (born 2003)

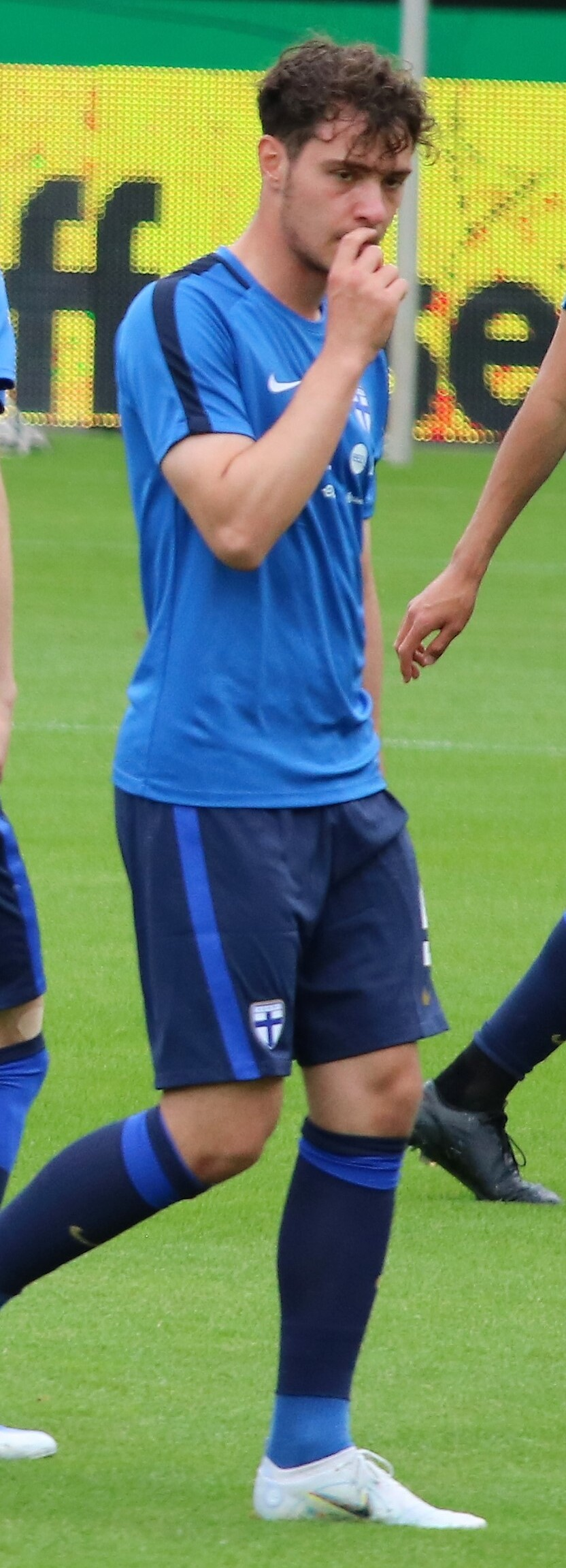
- Sadiku with Finland U21 in 2022

Personal information
- Date of birth: 10 March 2003 (age 23)
- Place of birth: Raahe, Finland
- Height: 1.84 m (6 ft 0 in)
- Position: Centre-forward

Team information
- Current team: Chrobry Głogów
- Number: 17

Youth career
- 2008–2016: HJS
- 2017–2019: HJK

Senior career*
Years	Team	Apps	(Gls)
2020–2021	Klubi 04	25	(6)
2022–2023	Honka	26	(14)
2023–2024	Rosenborg	11	(0)
2023	→ Start (loan)	12	(2)
2024–2026	Emmen	21	(1)
2025	→ KuPS (loan)	27	(10)
2026–	Chrobry Głogów	0	(0)

International career^{‡}
2020	Finland U17	3	(0)
2021–2022	Finland U19	7	(1)
2021	Finland U20	1	(0)
2022–2023	Finland U21	10	(2)
2022	Kosovo	2	(0)
2023	Finland	2	(0)
- * Club domestic league appearances and goals as of 19 November 2025 ‡ National team caps and goals as of 17 October 2023

Agon Sadiku (born 10 March 2003) is a Finnish professional footballer who plays as a centre-forward for I liga club Chrobry Głogów. A former youth international for Finland, he played for the Kosovo national team in a pair of friendlies before switching back to play for the Finland national team.

== Club career ==
=== HJK ===
On 29 November 2019, Sadiku signed a first-team contract with Veikkausliiga club HJK. On 27 June 2020, Sadiku made his debut with HJK's reserve team in a league match against TPV after coming on as a substitute in the 74th minute in place of Arttu Eerola.

=== Honka ===
On 31 December 2021, Sadiku joined Veikkausliiga side Honka. His debut with Honka came on 8 February 2022 in the 2022 Finnish League Cup group stage against Haka after being named in the starting line-up. Four days after debut, Sadiku scored his first goal for Honka in his second appearance for the club in a 4–0 away win over Lahti in Finnish League Cup. During his first season in the Finnish top-tier, Sadiku scored 14 goals in 26 appearances, making him the third best scorer in the campaign, after Lee Erwin and Kalle Multanen.

=== Rosenborg ===
On 31 March 2023, Sadiku joined Rosenborg on a five-year deal, for a transfer fee of €700,000 plus add-ons. Sadiku scored his first goal for Rosenborg on 24 May 2023, a winning goal in a Norwegian Cup win over Sportsklubben Trygg/Lade.

==== Start (loan) ====
On 4 August 2023, Sadiku was sent on loan to 1. divisjon club Start for the rest of the season. Sadiku suffered an injury late in the season, which required surgery.

=== Emmen ===
On 16 August 2024, Sadiku joined Emmen in Eerste Divisie on a two-year deal with a one-year option for €150,000.

==== KuPS (loan) ====
On 20 February 2025, Sadiku was loaned back to Finland on a season-long loan deal with KuPS. On 1 July, Sadiku scored three goals as KuPS defeated Gnistan 6–2 at home.

His contract with Emmen was terminated on 22 April 2026.

=== Chrobry Głogów ===
On 19 July 2026, Sadiku signed a two-year deal with Polish I liga club Chrobry Głogów.

== International career ==
=== Finland ===
From 2020, until 2022, Sadiku has been part of Finland at youth international level, respectively has been part of the U17, U19, U20 and U21 teams and he with these teams played fourteen matches and scored two goals.

=== Kosovo ===
In October 2022, it was announced by the Kosovan media that Sadiku has decided to represent Kosovo at the international level. On 11 November 2022, he formalizes the decision and accept their call-up for the friendly matches against Armenia and Faroe Islands. His debut with Kosovo came five days after call-up in a friendly match against Armenia after being named in the starting line-up.

=== Return to Finland ===
On 30 December 2022, Sadiku unexpectedly decided to represent Finland again by accepting their call-up from the senior team for the friendly matches against Sweden and Estonia. His debut with Finland came ten days after call-up in the friendly match against Sweden after being named in the starting line-up.

== Career statistics ==
=== Club ===
As of 24 April 2026

Appearances and goals by club, season and competition
Club	Season	League			National cup (Note: Includes Finnish Cup, Norwegian Cup)		League cup (Note: Includes Kakkonen Cup, Finnish League Cup)		Europe		Total	
Club	Season	Division	Apps	Goals	Apps	Goals	Apps	Goals	Apps	Goals	Apps	Goals
Klubi 04	2019	Kakkonen	0	0	0	0	1	0	—		1	0
Klubi 04	2020	Kakkonen	5	4	0	0	—		—		5	4
Klubi 04	2021	Ykkönen	20	2	3	0	—		—		23	2
Klubi 04	Total		25	6	3	0	1	0	0	0	29	6
Honka	2022	Veikkausliiga	26	14	1	0	6	3	—		33	17
Honka	2023	Veikkausliiga	0	0	0	0	5	0	0	0	5	0
Honka	Total		26	14	1	0	11	3	0	0	38	17
Rosenborg	2023	Eliteserien	8	0	1	1	—		1 (Note: Appearance in UEFA Europa Conference League)	0	10	1
Rosenborg	2024	Eliteserien	3	0	3	3	—		—		6	3
Rosenborg	Total		11	0	4	4	0	0	1	0	16	4
Rosenborg 2	2023	3. divisjon	4	7	—		—		—		4	7
Rosenborg 2	2024	3. divisjon	5	1	—		—		—		5	1
Rosenborg 2	Total		9	8	0	0	0	0	0	0	9	8
Start (loan)	2023	1. divisjon	12	2	0	0	—		—		12	2
Start 2 (loan)	2023	3. divisjon	1	0	—		—		—		1	0
Emmen	2024–25	Eerste Divisie	17	1	0	0	—		—		17	1
Emmen	2025–26	Eerste Divisie	4	0	0	0	—		—		4	0
Emmen	Total		21	1	0	0	0	0	0	0	21	1
KuPS (loan)	2025	Veikkausliiga	27	10	5	3	2	1	10 (Note: Four appearances in UEFA Champions League, two appearances in UEFA Europa League, four appearances in UEFA Conference League)	0	44	14
Chrobry Głogów	2026–27	I liga	0	0	0	0	—		—		0	0
Career total			128	41	13	7	14	4	11	0	165	52

=== International ===
As of match played on 12 January 2023

National team	Year	Competitive		Friendly		Total	
National team	Year	Apps	Goals	Apps	Goals	Apps	Goals
Kosovo	2022	0	0	2	0	2	0
Total		0	0	2	0	2	0
Finland	2023	0	0	2	0	2	0
Total		0	0	2	0	2	0

== Honours ==
Klubi 04

- Kakkonen Group B: 2020

Honka

- Finnish League Cup: 2022

KuPS

- Veikkausliiga: 2025

Individual

- Veikkausliiga Rookie of the Year: 2022
- Veikkausliiga Team of the Year: 2022
