= Johannes Kreidl =

Austrian footballer

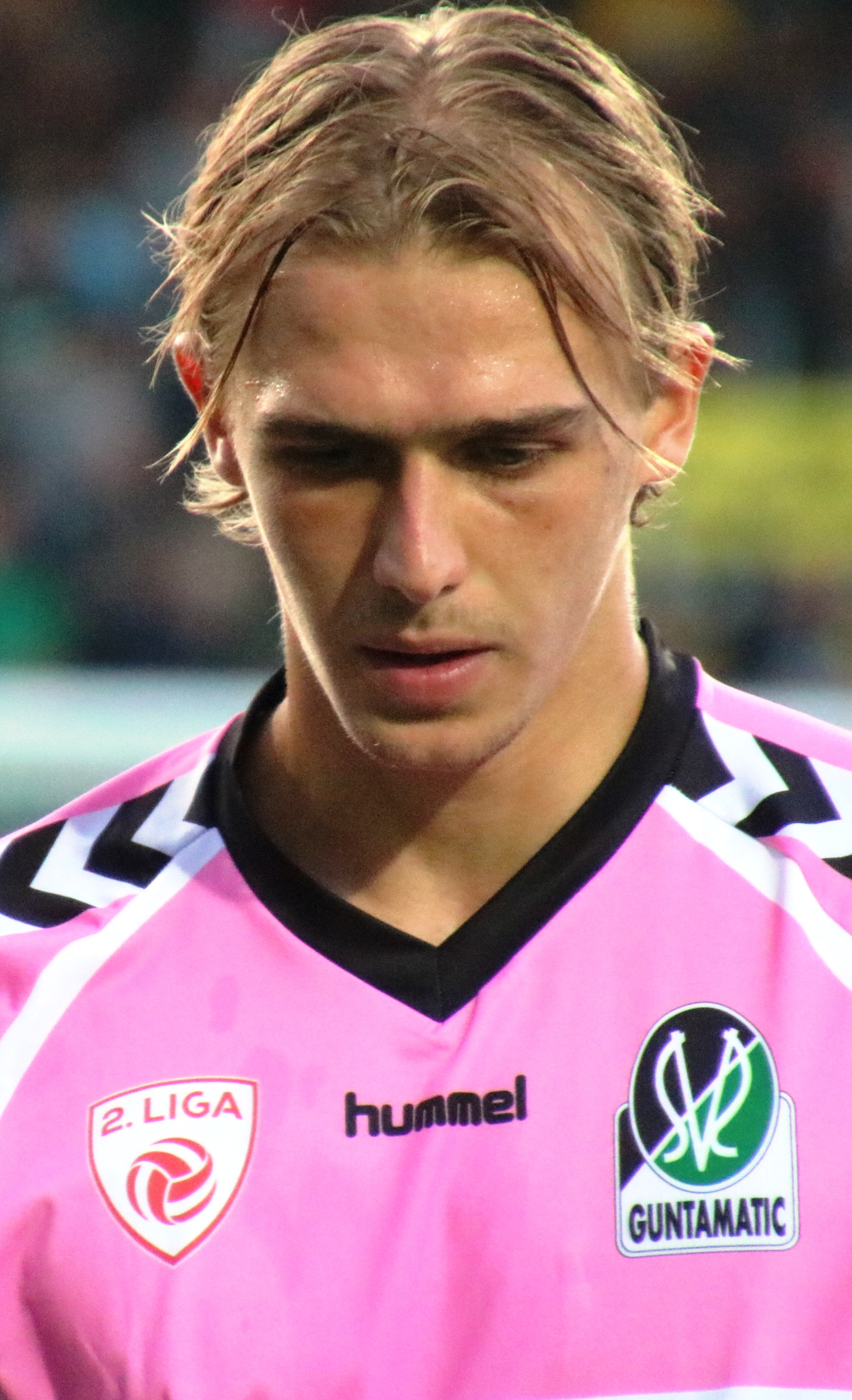
- Kreidl with SV Ried in 2018

Personal information
- Date of birth: 7 March 1996 (age 30)
- Place of birth: Hart im Zillertal, Austria
- Height: 1.93 m (6 ft 4 in)
- Position: Goalkeeper

Team information
- Current team: KuPS
- Number: 1

Youth career
- 2001–2010: SV Fügen
- 2010–2014: AKA Tirol
- 2014–2015: Hamburger SV

Senior career*
Years	Team	Apps	(Gls)
2014	SV Fügen	1	(0)
2014	Wacker Innsbruck II	1	(0)
2014–2017	Hamburger SV II	1	(0)
2016	→ KuPS (loan)	24	(0)
2017–2018	1. FC Nürnberg	0	(0)
2017–2018	1. FC Nürnberg II	20	(0)
2018–2020	SV Ried	53	(0)
2021–	KuPS	152	(0)

International career^{‡}
2014	Austria U18	2	(0)
2014	Austria U19	2	(0)
2015	Austria U20	1	(0)
2018	Austria U21	3	(0)
- * Club domestic league appearances and goals as of 12 November 2026 ‡ National team caps and goals as of 16:47, 26 September 2019 (UTC)

Johannes Kreidl (born 7 March 1996) is an Austrian professional footballer who plays as a goalkeeper for Veikkausliiga club KuPS.

== Club career ==
In early 2021, Kreidl returned to Kuopion Palloseura (KuPS). On 10 August 2023, he signed a new five-year deal with the club until the end of 2028. He won the Finnish Championship title with KuPS in 2024. Additionally they have won three Finnish Cups, in 2021, 2022 and 2024.

== Personal life ==
Kreidl and his Finnish girlfriend Niina were married in December 2022. The wedding ceremony was held in Austria. The couple had met in 2016, when Kreidl was playing for KuPS as a loan player. They have two children, the twins, who were born in December 2024.

== Career statistics ==
As of 24 July 2026.

Appearances and goals by club, season and competition
Club	Season	League			Cup (Note: Includes Austrian Cup, Suomen Cup)		League cup (Note: Includes Finnish League Cup)		Europe		Total	
Club	Season	Division	Apps	Goals	Apps	Goals	Apps	Goals	Apps	Goals	Apps	Goals
Wacker Innsbruck II	2013–14	Austrian Regionalliga West	1	0	–		–		–		1	0
Hamburger SV II	2014–15	Regionalliga Nord	1	0	–		–		–		1	0
Hamburger SV II	2015–16	Regionalliga Nord	0	0	–		–		–		0	0
Hamburger SV II	Total		1	0	0	0	0	0	0	0	1	0
KuPS (loan)	2016	Veikkausliiga	24	0	4	0	4	0	–		32	0
1. FC Nürnberg II	2016–17	Regionalliga Bayern	9	0	–		–		–		9	0
1. FC Nürnberg II	2017–18	Regionalliga Bayern	11	0	–		–		–		11	0
1. FC Nürnberg II	Total		20	0	0	0	0	0	0	0	20	0
1. FC Nürnberg	2017–18	2. Bundesliga	0	0	0	0	–		–		0	0
SV Ried	2018–19	Austrian 2. Liga	30	0	1	0	–		–		31	0
SV Ried	2019–20	Austrian 2. Liga	23	0	3	0	–		–		26	0
SV Ried	Total		53	0	4	0	0	0	0	0	57	0
KuFu-98	2021	Kakkonen	1	0	–		–		–		1	0
KuPS	2021	Veikkausliiga	23	0	1	0	–		8 (Note: Appearances in UEFA Conference League)	0	32	0
KuPS	2022	Veikkausliiga	23	0	2	0	4	0	6	0	35	0
KuPS	2023	Veikkausliiga	27	0	0	0	5	0	2	0	34	0
KuPS	2024	Veikkausliiga	24	0	3	0	4	0	4	0	35	0
KuPS	2025	Veikkausliiga	28	0	3	0	4	0	15 (Note: three Appearances in UEFA Champions League, four Appearances in UEFA Europa League, eight Appearances in UEFA Conference League)	0	50	0
KuPS	2026	Veikkausliiga	15	0	1	0	2	0	3 (Note: Appearances in UEFA Champions League)	0	21	0
KuPS	Total		140	0	10	0	19	0	38	0	207	0
Career total			240	0	18	0	23	0	38	0	319	0

== Honours ==
Kuopion Palloseura

- Veikkausliiga: 2024
- Veikkausliiga runner-up: 2021, 2022, 2023
- Finnish Cup: 2021, 2022, 2024
- Finnish League Cup runner-up: 2024

Individual

- Veikkausliiga Goalkeeper of the Year: 2021, 2023, 2024
- Veikkausliiga Team of the Year: 2021, 2022, 2023, 2024
