= Michael Fonsell =

Finnish footballer (born 2003)

Personal information
- Date of birth: 26 July 2003 (age 23)
- Place of birth: Finland
- Height: 1.87 m (6 ft 2 in)
- Position: Midfielder

Team information
- Current team: IFK Mariehamn
- Number: 14

Youth career
- IFK Mariehamn

Senior career*
Years	Team	Apps	(Gls)
2021–2023	Åland	27	(4)
2023–2026	IFK Mariehamn	44	(1)
2026-	Os Turn	9	(1)
- * Club domestic league appearances and goals as of 19 November 2026

Michael Fonsell (born 26 July 2003) in Mariehamn is a Finnish professional footballer who plays as a midfielder for Norwegian team Os Turn. He has earlier played in Veikkausliiga club IFK Mariehamn.
