= Mattias Wiklöf =

Swedish footballer

Personal information
- Date of birth: 24 May 1979 (age 47)
- Place of birth: Sweden
- Height: 1.86 m (6 ft 1 in)
- Position: Forward

Youth career
- Ockelbo IF

Senior career*
Years	Team	Apps	(Gls)
2001–2007	Sandvikens IF		
2008	IFK Mariehamn	24	(6)
2009–2011	IK Brage	61	(6)
2012–2013	IFK Mariehamn	50	(9)
2014–?	IK Tord		
- * Club domestic league appearances and goals as of 29 November 2021

Mattias Wiklöf (born 24 May 1979) is a Swedish footballer. After playing in the Veikkausliiga with IFK Mariehamn on two occasions, he semi-retired in 2014 with IK Tord.
