= Arvid Lundberg (footballer) =

Finnish footballer (born 2006)

Personal information
- Full name: Arvid Axel Alonzo Lundberg
- Date of birth: 24 May 2006 (age 20)
- Place of birth: Mariehamn, Finland
- Height: 1.90 m (6 ft 3 in)
- Position: Centre forward

Team information
- Current team: IFK Mariehamn
- Number: 21

Youth career
- IFK Mariehamn
- 2023–2024: → Pafos (loan)

Senior career*
Years	Team	Apps	(Gls)
2022–2023	Åland	22	(13)
2022–	IFK Mariehamn	22	(0)
2024–	IFK Mariehamn II	15	(19)

International career
2021	Finland U16	1	(1)
2022	Finland U17	3	(0)
- * Club domestic league appearances and goals as of 24 July 2026

Arvid Axel Alonzo Lundberg (born 24 May 2006) is a Finnish professional footballer who plays as a centre forward for Veikkausliiga club IFK Mariehamn.
