= Wille Nuñez =

Finnish footballer (born 2007)

Personal information
- Date of birth: 7 January 2007 (age 19)
- Place of birth: Mariehamn, Finland
- Height: 1.70 m (5 ft 7 in)
- Position: Centre forward

Team information
- Current team: IFK Mariehamn
- Number: 9

Youth career
- IFK Mariehamn

Senior career*
Years	Team	Apps	(Gls)
2023	FC Åland	1	(0)
2024–	IFK Mariehamn	17	(1)
2024–	→ IFK Mariehamn II	21	(8)
- * Club domestic league appearances and goals as of 13 November 2026

Wille Nuñez (born 7 January 2007) is a Finnish professional footballer who plays as a centre forward for Veikkausliiga club IFK Mariehamn.
