= Saira Peter =

British-Pakistani Sufi opera singer

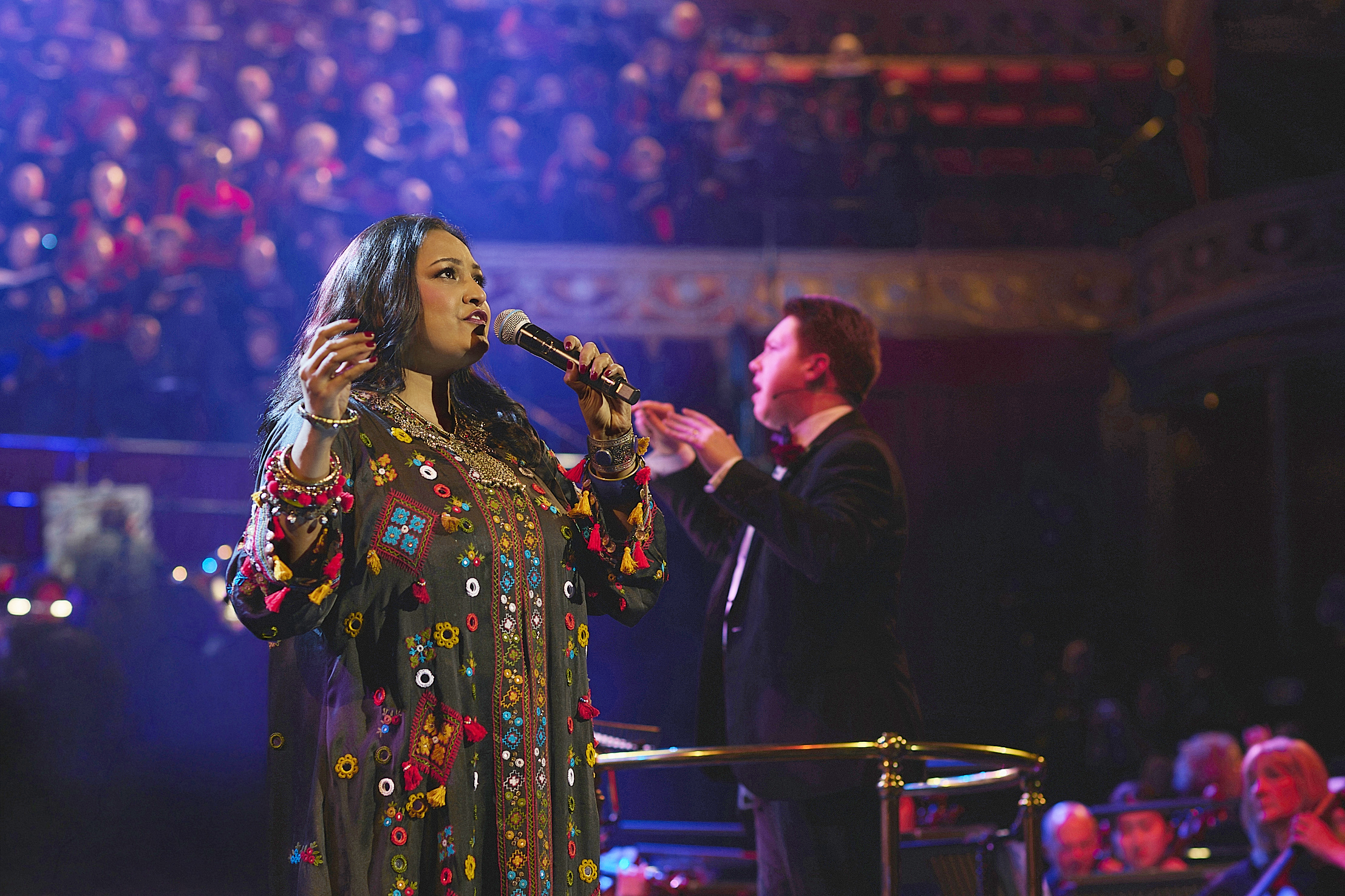
- Peter performs at Royal Albert Hall, London
- Occupation: Singer
- Website: https://sairapeter.com/

Saira Peter is a British-Pakistani soprano officially recognised as the world's first Sufi opera singer, for which she has been selected to receive Pakistan’s 2026 Presidential honour, the ‘Sitara-e-Imtiaz’ (‘Star of Excellence’). She is director of NJ Arts London, a multicultural performing arts centre opened in 1998 by Sir Cliff Richard OBE. She is also founder of Saira Arts Academy (SAA) which was officially inaugurated in Lahore by Fed. Min. for National Heritage and Culture, Syed Jamal Shah, who lauded it as 'heralding a new era in the country’s music industry.'

== Early life ==
Born in Karachi, Pakistan, Saira Peter displayed singing talent at a young age, performing for church and community events, but she had no formal music training as a child. Upon completing her first Masters she moved to London and began to study western classical voice.

== Education and training ==
Saira Peter completed both a BSc (Hons) and an MSc (Distinction) in Physical Chemistry from University of Karachi, followed by an MA in History from Queen Mary University of London.

She is coached in western classical voice by composer Paul Knight. She studied raagdari with Chitrarupa Gupta (disciple of Pundit A.T. Kanan and Geeta Bannerjee) and the late Ustad Fida Hussain Khan (Patiala Gharana).

== Performance ==
Saira Peter has given solo western classical performances in the UK, USA, Germany, Turkey and Pakistan.

Her 2016 Pakistan debut took place at Pearl-Continental Hotel in Karachi, followed since by performances at major national venues including Mohatta Palace, Aiwan-e-Sadr (Presidential Palace, Islamabad), Governor House in Karachi, Alhamra Art Center in Lahore, Pakistan National Council of Arts (Islamabad and Lahore). She is regularly invited by the High Commission of Pakistan, London to sing at official events, which they feature on official social media.

Saira Peter was final judge and then chief judge on two consecutive seasons of Pakistan's reality series Voice of Sindh.

In September 2021 she performed a solo set at the international Mystic Music Festival in Konya, Turkey in commemoration of the birth of Sufi poet Mevlana Rumi. With the support of Department of Culture, Konya, Peter created a "fusion qawwali" based on the poetry of Mevlana Rumi, featuring footage at the shrine of Mevlana Rumi in Konya.

In November 2025, Saira Peter performed in Islamabad at the Sir Syed Memorial Auditorium under the auspices of the Silk Road Culture Centre. Her programme included Western operatic arias, Eastern classical and semi‑classical pieces, and elements of her “Sufi Opera” fusion style. She was joined on stage by students from the Saira Arts Academy and accompanied musically by music director Stephen Smith. The concert drew an audience of music enthusiasts and cultural patrons, and former federal culture minister Jamal Shah attended as chief guest, commenting on her contribution to promoting opera and fusion music in Pakistan.

In February 2026, Saira Peter participated in the “She Leads the Nations” Global Summit at the US House of Congress, DC. During the summit Saira was honoured with an Award, SHE LEADS THE NATIONS for reaching out to marginalised women through her spiritual Sufi Opera® songs. The event was covered by international media.

In June 2026 Saira Peter was a featured soloist for Prom Praise at Royal Albert Hall, where she performed five songs, three solos and two group performances. She was accompanied by a combined 525 musicians, including All Souls Orchestra and a massed choir, all under the baton of Artistic Director Michael Andrews. Her performance received positive reception across mainstream Pakistani media, and drew praise from Pakistan's Federal Minister for National Heritage and Culture, Aurangzeb Khan Khichi, who called it a "remarkable example of cultural diplomacy."

July 2026 saw Saira Peter honoured as an official guest in Windsor Castle, where she stayed for three days as a participant in the international women's summit, She Leads United Kingdom. By request she sang sacred songs inside St George's Chapel and later performed an aria from her Sufi Opera Marvi's Tears in the Castle's Vicar's Hall, St George's House, site of the original production of Shakespeare's play The Merry Wives of Windsor.

== Television and film ==
Peter has recorded original soundtrack vocals for Pakistani primetime television dramas. On 6 May 2022 her OST featured on GEO TV's Dil Awaiz, a duet with Nabeel Shaukat (composer: Naveed Nashad), the first episode quickly gaining millions of views. She recorded a solo OST composed by Naveed Nashad for HUM TV network's Nehar, the first episode airing 9 May 2022. In 2026, Peter sang the original soundtrack "Tanha Akeli Hoon" for the television drama Muamma. The song, filmed on actress Saba Qamar, received media attention following its release.

=== Television series' soundtracks ===
Year	Title	Song	Network	Composer	Lyricist	Co-singer(s)	Ref(s)
2025	Muamma	"Tanha Akeli Hoon"	Hum TV	Naveed Nashad	Fatima Najeeb		

== Sufi opera ==
Passionate about bringing together people of all backgrounds, during her second MA (History), Saira Peter identified music as a historical means of bridging otherwise isolated communities and promoting a positive message. Simultaneously in the midst of studying Western Classical voice, she envisioned using her music to take Sufi peace poetry to the world stage.

In 2015-16 she worked with vocal coach Paul Knight to create several Sufi opera songs based on English translations of poetry by Shah Abdul Latif Bhittai. These were well received by diverse audiences in the UK, USA and Pakistan. She is currently working with a team of British professional artists to stage the world’s first full-scale Sufi opera, a musical stage drama based on the story of Umar Marvi, one of Latif’s “seven heroines” of Sindh. The new fusion opera is set to debut in the United Kingdom, with Peter in the role of Marvi.

Peter has also pioneered a fusion style of the qawwali genre in which she incorporates both Western operatic and South Asian classical styles of singing. This may be heard in her fusion qawwali 'Rabeem Ver, which feature's text by famed Sufi poet Maulana Jalalluddin Rumi. Peter first performed the song live at Mystic Music Festival (Konya, Turkey) before producing an audio and video recording in collaboration with Konya Culture and Tourism Directorate.

== Personal life ==
Saira Peter lives in London, UK, with her husband, the ethnomusicologist and pianist / harmonium player Stephen Smith.

== Artistry ==
According to The Express Tribune, Peter's career wish is "to translate Sufi poetry for Western music so they can understand Pakistani people and their desire for peace". In an interview with Arab News, she described her own music, culminating in the Sufi opera genre, as "merging the two worlds", of Western and Pakistani classical music. She regularly incorporates both traditional Pakistani songs and Western classical art songs into her concerts. Pakistan's media often credits Peter with introducing Western operatic singing to Pakistan.

Academic and arts historian Dr. Sadia Kamran has praised the socially cohesive nature of Peter's performances, stating in the Express Tribune: "You demonstrated how music can create dialogue across geographical and cultural boundaries, connecting audiences through shared listening even when their histories and experiences differ."

== Awards and distinctions ==
- 2018: Recorded "God Save the Queen" by request of East Sussex government offices (Hastings, UK) for which she received letter of gratitude from (late) HM Queen Elizabeth II. Peter is the first Asian and first Pakistani to record the British national anthem.
- Islamabad Art Fest 2019: Award for Best Music Performance at Pakistan's largest international arts event
- 2022: Re-recorded British national anthem as "God Save the King", receiving a letter of appreciation from HM King Charles III in response.
- 2026: 'She Leads the Nations' award as an 'international woman of distinction', presented in US House of Congress, Washington DC.
- 2026: 'Global Woman of Distinction,' presented by She Leads United Kingdom, Windsor Castle, UK.
- 2026: ‘Sitara-e-Imtiaz’ (‘Star of Excellence’), given by Pakistan's President Asif Ali Zardari to Saira Peter as a "Sufi opera singer", for making "outstanding contributions to arts" and "achieving international recognition bringing honour to Pakistan"

== Discography ==
- Resplendent (2017)
- Raqs-E-Rooh (2018)
- Yeh Zindagi (2021)

== Videography ==
- Zarori Tha – 2015
- Pairey Pawandi Saan – 2015
- Aao Rana – 2015
- You Are My Friend – 2015
