= Mikael Granskog =

Finnish footballer (born 1961)

Personal information
- Date of birth: 26 March 1961 (age 65)
- Place of birth: Mariehamn, Finland
- Position: Defender

Senior career*
| Years | Team | Apps | (Gls) |
| 1977–1980 | IFK Mariehamn | | |
| 1981–1986 | IFK Norrköping | 82 | (0) |
| 1987 | Väsby IK | | |
| 1989 | Bollstanäs SK | | |
| 1991–1994 | IFK Mariehamn | | |

International career
- Finland U21
| 1982–1986 | Finland | 16 | (1) |
- * Club domestic league appearances and goals

Mikael Granskog (born 26 March 1961) is a retired Finnish football defender.
