= Leo Andersson =

Finnish footballer (born 2004)

Personal information
- Date of birth: 11 June 2004 (age 22)
- Place of birth: Finland
- Height: 1.85 m (6 ft 1 in)
- Position: Midfielder

Team information
- Current team: IFK Mariehamn
- Number: 43

Youth career
- –2017: KyIF
- 2018–2019: FC Kirkkonummi
- 2020–2022: IFK Mariehamn

Senior career*
Years	Team	Apps	(Gls)
2022–2023	Åland	30	(2)
2022–	IFK Mariehamn	58	(2)

International career
2023–	Åland	3	(0)
- * Club domestic league appearances and goals as of 13 November 2026

Leo Andersson (born 11 June 2004) is a Finnish professional footballer who plays as a midfielder for Veikkausliiga club IFK Mariehamn. He has also played for the Åland national team at the 2023 Island Games in Guernsey.

== Career statistics ==
Åland
Year	Apps	Goals
2023	3	0
Total	3	0
