= 2021 Veikkausliiga =

Veikkausliiga
- Season: 2021
- Champions: HJK
- Relegated: KTP
- Champions League: HJK
- Europa Conference League: KuPS; SJK; Inter Turku
- Matches: 162
- Goals: 408 (2.52 per match)
- Top goalscorer: Benjamin Källman; Ariel Ngueukam (14 goals each)
- Biggest home win: KuPS 4–0 KTP (15 August 2021)
- Biggest away win: HIFK 1–5 KuPS (22 August 2021)
- Highest scoring: HJK 4–2 Honka (24 April 2021); Lahti 2–4 KuPS (11 May 2021); HIFK 1–5 KuPS (22 August 2021)
- Longest winning run: 9 matches HJK
- Longest unbeaten run: 12 matches Lahti
- Longest winless run: 13 matches KTP
- Longest losing run: 7 matches Mariehamn

The 2021 Veikkausliiga was the 91st season of top-tier football in Finland. HJK were the defending champions and successfully defended their title.

== Teams ==
RoPS (relegated after eight years in the top flight) were relegated to Ykkönen after finishing at the bottom of the 2020 season. Their place was taken by Ykkönen champions AC Oulu (promoted after a ten-year absence).

TPS (relegated after one year in the top flight) as 11th-placed team lost their Veikkausliiga spot after losing to second-placed Ykkönen team KTP (promoted after a five-year absence) in a relegation/promotion playoff.

=== Stadia and locations ===
Location of teams in 2021 Veikkausliiga

Club	Location	Stadium	Turf	Capacity
AC Oulu	Oulu	Raatti Stadion	Natural	4,392
FC Haka	Valkeakoski	Tehtaan kenttä	Artificial	3,516
FC Honka	Espoo	Tapiolan Urheilupuisto	Natural	6,000
FC Inter	Turku	Veritas Stadion	Natural	9,372
FC Lahti	Lahti	Lahden Stadion	Natural	7,465
HIFK	Helsinki	Bolt Arena	Artificial	10,770
HJK	Helsinki	Bolt Arena	Artificial	10,770
IFK Mariehamn	Mariehamn	Wiklöf Holding Arena	Artificial	4,000
Ilves	Tampere	Tampere Stadium	Natural	16,800
KTP	Kotka	Arto Tolsa Areena	Artificial	4,780
KuPS	Kuopio	Savon Sanomat Areena	Artificial	5,000
SJK	Seinäjoki	OmaSP Stadion	Artificial	6,000

=== Personnel and kits ===
Note: Flags indicate national team as has been defined under FIFA eligibility rules. Players and Managers may hold more than one non-FIFA nationality.

Team	Manager	Captain	Manufacturer	Shirt sponsor(s)
AC Oulu	(Finland) Jyrki Ahola	(Finland) Lassi Nurmos	Craft	Go On Oulu / Codemate / Oulun Energia
FC Haka	(Finland) Teemu Tainio	(United States) Jacob Bushue	Puma	Volkswagen
FC Honka	(Finland) Vesa Vasara	(Finland) Duarte Tammilehto	Puma	Volkswagen
FC Inter	(Spain) José Riveiro	(Finland) Timo Furuholm	Nike	Alfons Håkans
FC Lahti	(Finland) Ilir Zeneli	(Finland) Kari Arkivuo	Umbro	Halton / Oomi / Green Lahti
HIFK	(Spain) Joaquín Gómez	(Finland) Sakari Mattila	Puma	Aktia Bank
HJK	(Finland) Toni Koskela	(Finland) Daniel O'Shaughnessy	Adidas	Apu
IFK Mariehamn	(Sweden) Lukas Syberyjski	(Netherlands) Robin Buwalda	Puma	Åland / Arkipelag
Ilves	(Finland) Toni Kallio	(Finland) Tuure Siira	Adidas	Pohjola Rakennus / Avant Tecno / Pihlajalinna / NYQS Oy
KTP	(Finland) Teemu Kankkunen	(Finland) David Ramadingaye	Puma	Kotkamills Oy / Steveco Oy / Hartwall
KuPS	(Finland) Simo Valakari	(Ghana) Nana Boateng	Puma	Pohjola Sairaala (home) / LähiTapiola (away)
SJK	(Finland) Jani Honkavaara	(Finland) Mehmet Hetemaj	Adidas	LähiTapiola / Oma Säästöpankki / Elisa

== League table ==
Pos	Team	Pld	W	D	L	GF	GA	GD	Pts	Qualification
1	KuPS	22	15	4	3	38	14	+24	49	Qualification for the Championship round
2	HJK	22	15	4	3	32	12	+20	49	Qualification for the Championship round
3	Inter Turku	22	12	3	7	36	22	+14	39	Qualification for the Championship round
4	SJK	22	11	4	7	29	24	+5	37	Qualification for the Championship round
5	HIFK	22	9	6	7	23	23	0	33	Qualification for the Championship round
6	Ilves	22	10	3	9	21	23	−2	33	Qualification for the Championship round
7	Lahti	22	8	8	6	27	25	+2	32	Qualification for the Relegation round
8	Honka	22	7	5	10	28	29	−1	26	Qualification for the Relegation round
9	Haka	22	7	3	12	21	26	−5	24	Qualification for the Relegation round
10	Mariehamn	22	7	2	13	20	32	−12	23	Qualification for the Relegation round
11	Oulu	22	5	3	14	17	35	−18	18	Qualification for the Relegation round
12	KTP	22	1	5	16	18	45	−27	8	Qualification for the Relegation round

Source: Flashscore
Rules for classification: 1) Points; 2) Goal difference; 3) Goals scored; 4) Head-to-head points; 5) Head-to-head goal difference; 6) Head-to-head away goals scored; 7) Play-off
(Note: Play-off is only played if need to decide champion, teams for relegation or UEFA competition and will be played on a neutral ground).

== Results ==
Home \ Away	HAK	HFK	HJK	HON	ILV	INT	KPS	KTP	LAH	MAR	OUL	SJK
Haka	—	2–0	1–2	1–1	0–1	1–0	0–1	0–3	1–1	1–2	0–1	4–0
HIFK	2–0	—	0–1	1–0	1–1	1–4	1–5	2–2	0–1	0–3	3–1	1–0
HJK	2–0	0–2	—	4–2	2–1	0–1	1–1	2–0	2–0	1–0	3–1	0–0
Honka	2–1	0–3	0–0	—	4–1	1–2	0–1	3–1	1–1	0–2	1–0	0–1
Ilves	1–0	1–0	0–3	0–0	—	2–1	3–2	2–0	1–0	2–0	1–0	0–1
Inter Turku	2–1	0–1	1–3	2–2	2–0	—	1–0	2–1	1–1	3–0	4–0	2–0
KuPS	1–2	0–0	0–0	2–1	1–0	1–0	—	4–0	2–2	2–0	2–0	3–0
KTP	0–0	0–2	0–1	1–3	1–1	1–3	1–2	—	1–2	1–3	1–3	0–1
Lahti	0–2	0–0	0–1	1–0	3–1	2–1	2–4	3–0	—	1–1	0–0	2–1
Mariehamn	0–3	0–0	0–1	1–3	1–0	0–2	0–1	4–2	0–3	—	3–1	0–1
Oulu	0–1	1–2	2–1	0–2	0–2	2–0	0–2	1–1	1–1	1–0	—	0–2
SJK	4–0	1–1	0–2	3–2	1–0	2–2	0–1	1–1	4–1	3–0	3–2	—

Source: Flashscore
Legend: Blue = home team win; Yellow = draw; Red = away team win.

== Championship round ==
Pos	Team	Pld	W	D	L	GF	GA	GD	Pts	Qualification	HJK	KPS	SJK	INT	ILV	HFK
1	HJK (C)	27	18	5	4	41	19	+22	59	Qualification for the Champions League first qualifying round	—	—	2–3	2–1	—	1–0
2	KuPS	27	17	7	3	46	20	+26	58	Qualification for the Europa Conference League first qualifying round	1–1	—	—	—	2–1	0–0
3	SJK	27	14	6	7	45	34	+11	48	Qualification for the Europa Conference League first qualifying round	—	2–2	—	—	4–2	—
4	Inter Turku	27	14	3	10	45	32	+13	45	Qualification for the Europa Conference League first qualifying round	—	2–3	2–5	—	—	2–0
5	Ilves	27	11	3	13	29	34	−5	36		2–3	—	—	0–2	—	—
6	HIFK	27	9	8	10	25	31	−6	35		—	—	2–2	—	0–3	—

Source: Soccerway
Rules for classification: 1) Points; 2) Goal difference; 3) Goals scored; 4) Head-to-head points; 5) Head-to-head goal difference; 6) Head-to-head away goals scored; 7) Play-off
(Note: Play-off is only played if need to decide champion, teams for relegation or UEFA competition and will be played on a neutral ground).
(C) Champions

== Relegation round ==
Pos	Team	Pld	W	D	L	GF	GA	GD	Pts	Qualification	LAH	HAK	HON	MAR	OUL	KTP
7	Lahti	27	10	10	7	35	30	+5	40		—	—	2–3	—	0–0	2–1
8	Haka	27	10	5	12	30	29	+1	35		1–1	—	—	2–0	0–0	—
9	Honka	27	9	6	12	38	37	+1	33		—	0–2	—	1–1	6–1	—
10	Mariehamn	27	9	3	15	28	40	−12	30		0–3	—	—	—	—	5–1
11	Oulu (O)	27	6	5	16	21	44	−23	23	Qualification for the relegation play-offs	—	—	—	1–2	—	2–1
12	KTP (R)	27	2	5	20	25	58	−33	11	Relegation to Ykkönen	—	2–4	2–0	—	—	—

Source: Soccerway
Rules for classification: 1) Points; 2) Goal difference; 3) Goals scored; 4) Head-to-head points; 5) Head-to-head goal difference; 6) Head-to-head away goals scored; 7) Play-off
(Note: Play-off is only played if need to decide champion, teams for relegation or UEFA competition and will be played on a neutral ground).
(O) Play-off winners; (R) Relegated

== Relegation play-offs ==
=== First leg ===
3 November 2021
17:30 EET (UTC+2)

RoPS	2–1	Oulu
Roiha 35'; Roffelsen 90'+5'	Report	Salanović 31' (pen.)

Rovaniemen keskuskenttä, Rovaniemi
Attendance: 1,640
Referee: Oliver Reitala

=== Second leg ===
7 November 2021
14:00 EET (UTC+2)

Oulu	2–0	RoPS
Opara 45'+2'; Saira 50'	Report	Acheampong (red card) 28'

Raatti Stadium, Oulu
Attendance: 2,738
Referee: Joni Hyytiä

== Statistics ==
=== Top goalscorers ===
As of 1 November 2021

Rank	Player	Club	Goals
1	(Finland) Benjamin Källman	Inter Turku	14
1	(Cameroon) Ariel Ngueukam	SJK	14
3	(Finland) Tim Väyrynen	KuPS	9
4	(England) Jake Jervis	SJK	8
4	(Finland) Urho Nissilä	KuPS	8
4	(South Africa) Darren Smith	FC Honka	8
7	(Nigeria) Geoffrey Chinedu	Lahti	7
7	(Finland) Timo Furuholm	Inter Turku	7
7	(Ukraine) Denys Oliynyk	SJK	7
7	(Finland) / (Kosovo) Altin Zeqiri	Lahti	7

== Awards ==
=== Annual awards ===
Award	Winner	Club
Player of the Year	(Finland) Urho Nissilä	KuPS
Goalkeeper of the Year	(Austria) Johannes Kreidl	KuPS
Defender of the Year	(Finland) Daniel O'Shaughnessy	HJK
Midfielder of the Year	(Finland) Urho Nissilä	KuPS
Striker of the Year	(Finland) Benjamin Källman	Inter Turku
Breakthrough of the Year	(Finland) Pyry Hannola	SJK
Coach of the Year	(Finland) Simo Valakari	KuPS

=== Team of the Year ===

Team of the Year
Goalkeeper	(Austria) Johannes Kreidl (KuPS)			
Defence	(United States) Macario Hing-Glover (HIFK)	(Finland) Diogo Tomas (KuPS)	(Finland) Daniel O'Shaughnessy (HJK)	(Colombia) Luis Carlos Murillo (HJK)
Midfield	(Finland) Riku Riski (HJK)	(Brazil) Jair (HJK)	(Finland) Urho Nissilä (KuPS)	(Finland) Peteri Forsell (Inter Turku)
Attack	(Scotland) Benjamin Källman (Inter Turku)		(Finland) Tim Väyrynen (KuPS)	
