= Anders Eriksson (footballer) =

Finnish footballer (born 1965)

Personal information
- Full name: Anders Eriksson
- Date of birth: 19 April 1965 (age 61)
- Place of birth: Mariehamn, Åland
- Position: Defender

Youth career
- IFK Mariehamn

Senior career*
Years	Team	Apps	(Gls)
1981–1985	IFK Mariehamn		(19)
1986	FF Jaro	22	(3)
1987	IFK Mariehamn		(20)
1988–1989	FF Jaro	41	(4)
1990	KPV	21	(2)
1991–1992	RoPS	38	(4)
1993	Bryne	17	(1)
1994–1995	Lyn	18	(1)
1996–1997	Östers IF	15	(0)
1997	FC Inter	8	(0)
1998	IFK Mariehamn	22	(3)

International career
1992–1995	Finland	15	(1)
- * Club domestic league appearances and goals

Anders Eriksson (born 19 April 1965) is a Finnish former football player. He played as a defender, and was capped 15 times for Finland scoring one goal.

Eriksson played for FF Jaro, KPV, RoPS and FC Inter at the first tier in Finland. He also played in the Norwegian First Division with Bryne and Lyn, and in Allsvenskan with Östers IF. Eriksson played for Lyn in the 1994 Norwegian Football Cup final, and became the first Finnish player to play in a Norwegian Football Cup final.
