= Nikolas Saira =

Finnish footballer (born 1999)

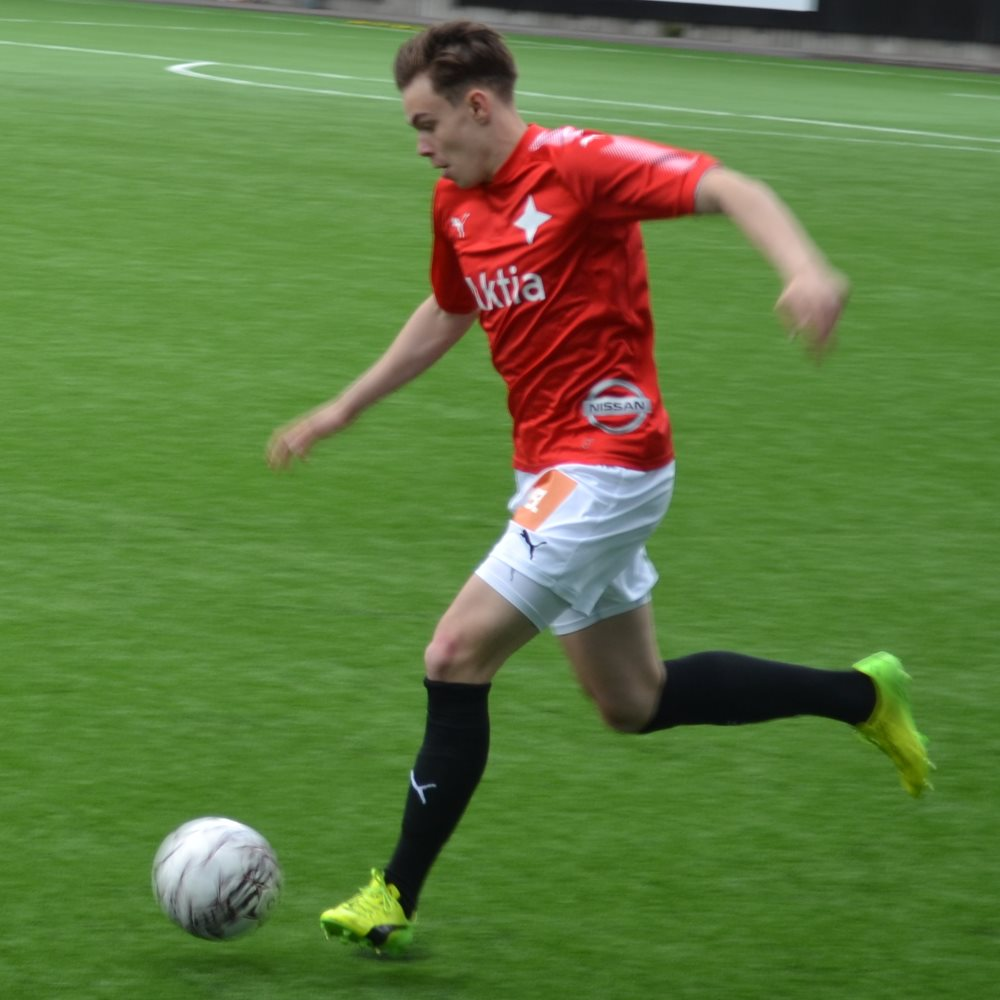
- Saira with HIFK in 2017

Personal information
- Date of birth: 11 February 1999 (age 27)
- Place of birth: Helsinki, Finland
- Height: 1.84 m (6 ft 0 in)
- Position: Forward

Team information
- Current team: HIFK
- Number: 9

Youth career
- Honka

Senior career*
| Years | Team | Apps | (Gls) |
| 2016–2017 | Espoo | 19 | (4) |
| 2017–2021 | HIFK | 32 | (1) |
| 2017 | → Gnistan (loan) | 1 | (0) |
| 2020 | → MyPa (loan) | 4 | (0) |
| 2021 | AC Oulu | 20 | (3) |
| 2022 | Olbia | 8 | (0) |
| 2023 | HIFK | 17 | (2) |
| 2025– | HIFK | 12 | (1) |

International career^{‡}
| 2015 | Finland U17 | 6 | (1) |
| 2016 | Finland U18 | 4 | (2) |
| 2017 | Finland U19 | 2 | (0) |
- * Club domestic league appearances and goals as of 7 November 2026 ‡ National team caps and goals as of 30 August 2017

Nikolas Saira (born 11 February 1999) is a Finnish professional footballer who plays as a forward for HIFK.

== Club career ==
Born in Helsinki, Saira started his career in FC Honka youth system.

On 28 January 2022, he signed with Italian Serie C club Olbia.

On 9 December 2022, Saira agreed to return to HIFK for the 2023 season.

== International career ==
Saira was a youth international for Finland.

== Career statistics ==
As of 23 September 2024.

Appearances and goals by club, season and competition
| Club | Season | League | | | Cup | | Total | |
| Club | Season | Division | Apps | Goals | Apps | Goals | Apps | Goals |
|---|---|---|---|---|---|---|---|---|
| Honka Akatemia | 2015 | Nelonen | 1 | 0 | – | | 1 | 0 |
| Espoo | 2016 | Kakkonen | 19 | 4 | – | | 19 | 4 |
| HIFK | 2017 | Veikkausliiga | 8 | 0 | 4 | 0 | 12 | 0 |
| HIFK | 2018 | Ykkönen | 12 | 1 | – | | 12 | 1 |
| HIFK | 2019 | Veikkausliiga | 12 | 0 | 4 | 0 | 16 | 0 |
| HIFK | 2020 | Veikkausliiga | 1 | 0 | 3 | 0 | 4 | 0 |
| HIFK | Total | | 33 | 1 | 11 | 0 | 44 | 1 |
| HIFK II | 2017 | Kolmonen | 3 | 1 | – | | 3 | 1 |
| HIFK II | 2018 | Kakkonen | 1 | 0 | – | | 1 | 0 |
| HIFK II | 2019 | Kolmonen | 5 | 3 | – | | 5 | 3 |
| HIFK II | Total | | 9 | 4 | 0 | 0 | 9 | 4 |
| Gnistan (loan) | 2017 | Ykkönen | 1 | 0 | – | | 1 | 0 |
| MYPA (loan) | 2020 | Ykkönen | 4 | 0 | – | | 4 | 0 |
| AC Oulu | 2021 | Veikkausliiga | 20 | 3 | 3 | 0 | 23 | 3 |
| OLS | 2021 | Kakkonen | 2 | 1 | – | | 2 | 1 |
| Olbia | 2021–22 | Serie C | 8 | 0 | 0 | 0 | 8 | 0 |
| HIFK | 2023 | Ykkönen | 17 | 2 | 8 | 1 | 25 | 3 |
| HIFK | 2025 | Kolmonen | 0 | 0 | 0 | 0 | 0 | 0 |
| Career total | | | 114 | 15 | 22 | 1 | 136 | 16 |
