= Lassi Nurmos =

Finnish former footballer (born 1994)

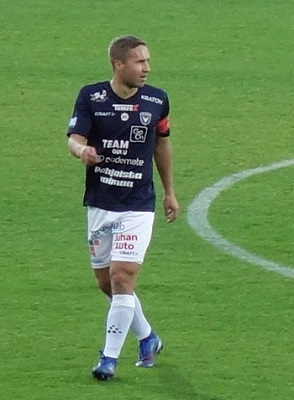
- Nurmos with AC Oulu in 2020

Personal information
- Date of birth: 24 July 1994 (age 32)
- Place of birth: Haukipudas, Finland
- Height: 1.79 m (5 ft 10 in)
- Position: Defender

Youth career
- 2000–2007: HauPa
- 2008–2010: Tervarit
- OLS

Senior career*
Years	Team	Apps	(Gls)
2011–2013	AC Oulu	54	(0)
2014	RoPS	16	(0)
2015–2016	AC Oulu	53	(1)
2017	PS Kemi	22	(0)
2018–2021	AC Oulu	82	(3)
2021	→ OLS	1	(0)
2022–2023	KTP	47	(1)

International career^{‡}
2011	Finland U17	6	(0)
2012	Finland U18	12	(0)
2013	Finland U19	1	(0)
2015	Finland U21	4	(0)
- * Club domestic league appearances and goals as of 9 October 2024 ‡ National team caps and goals as of 9 October 2024

Lassi Nurmos (born 24 July 1994) is a Finnish former professional footballer who last played as a centre back for KTP. He retired after the 2023 Veikkausliiga season.

== Honours ==
AC Oulu

- Ykkönen: 2020

KTP

- Ykkönen: 2022
