= Daniel Norrmén =

Swedish football player and manager (born 1975)

Personal information
- Date of birth: 11 February 1975 (age 51)
- Place of birth: Stockholm, Sweden
- Height: 1.75 m (5 ft 9 in)
- Position: Defensive midfielder

Senior career*
Years	Team	Apps	(Gls)
1999–2003	BP		
2003–2008	IFK Mariehamn		

Managerial career
- 2016–2021: IFK Mariehamn (assistant)
- 2021–2023: IFK Mariehamn
- 2024–: IFK Mariehamn II
- * Club domestic league appearances and goals

Daniel Norrmén (born 11 February 1975) is a Swedish football manager and a former player.

== Career ==
=== Playing career ===
Before the 1999 season, Norrmén signed for Swedish third tier side BP, helping them earn promotion to the Swedish second tier. Before the 2003 season, he signed for IFK Mariehamn in the Finnish third tier, helping them earn promotion to the Finnish top flight for the first time, within 2 seasons.

=== Managerial career ===
In 2009, he was appointed manager of Åland. In 2021, Norrmén was appointed manager of IFK Mariehamn in the Finnish top flight after serving as assistant manager between 2016 and 2021.

On 19 December 2023, it was announced that Norrmén will become the new head coach of IFK Mariehamn II, the new team that gains the division spot in Kolmonen from FC Åland.
