= Ilir Zeneli =

Finnish football manager (born 1984)

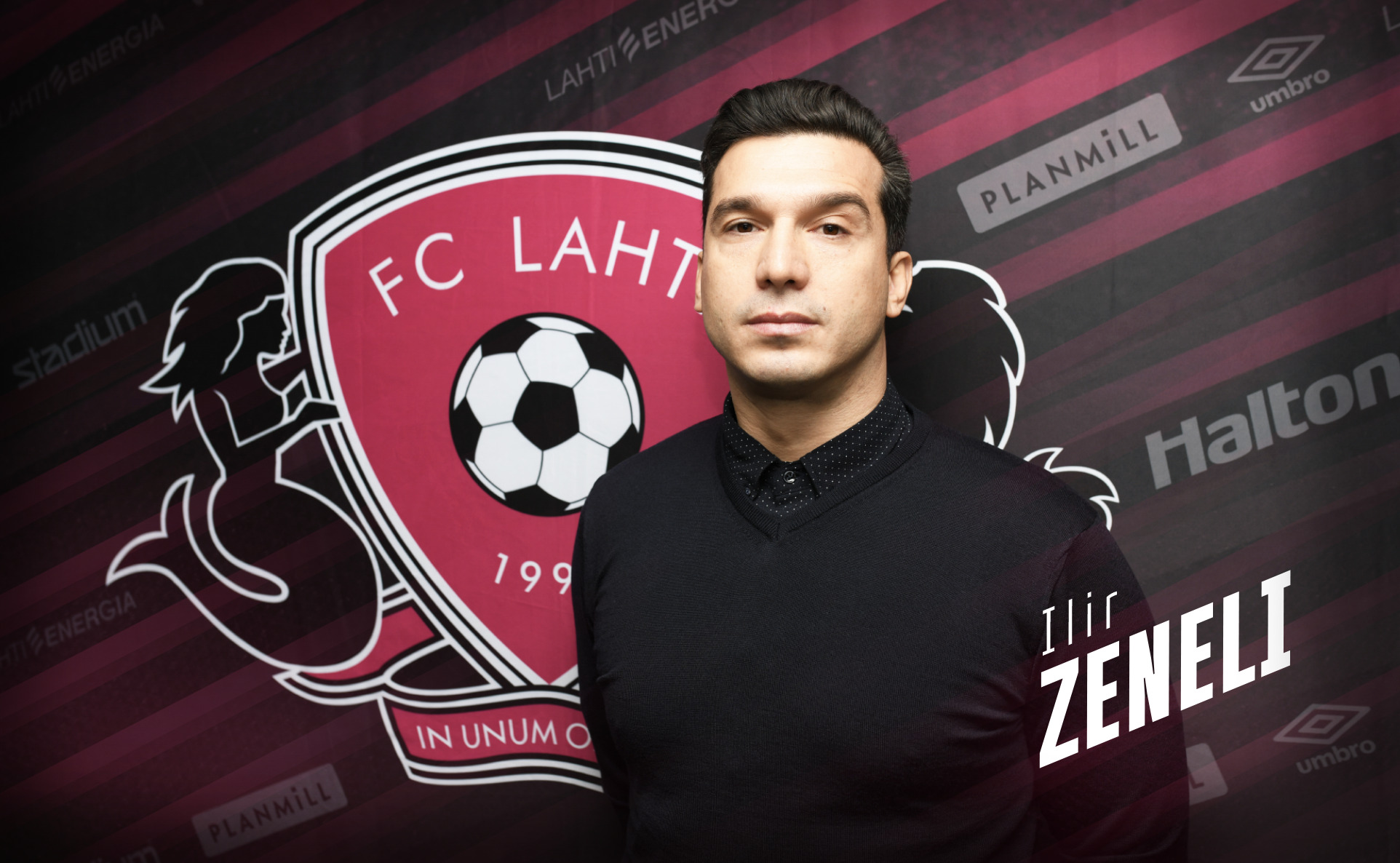

Personal information
- Date of birth: 15 January 1984 (age 42)
- Place of birth: Titova Mitrovica, Kosovo, Yugoslavia

Team information
- Current team: GrIFK (manager)

Youth career
- Years: Team
- EBK

Managerial career
- 2010: EBK
- 2011–2015: PK-35 Vantaa (assistant)
- 2013: PK-35 Vantaa (caretaker)
- 2016–2017: Espoo (youth)
- 2017–2019: Espoo
- 2020–2022: Lahti
- 2024: EBK
- 2025–: GrIFK

Ilir Zeneli (born 15 January 1984) is a Finnish-Kosovan football manager, currently working as a manager of Finnish club Grankulla IFK in Kakkonen.

== Club career ==
Zeneli was the manager of Veikkausliiga club FC Lahti during 2020–2022. He was dismissed on 23 June 2022.

== Personal life ==
Zeneli was born in Kosovo, and moved to Finland with his family in 1992. The family eventually settled in Espoo.
