= IFK Mariehamn =

Mariehamn
- Full name: Idrottsföreningen Kamraterna; Mariehamn
- Nicknames: Grönvitt (Green White); Saarelaiset (The Islanders).
- Founded: 1919; 107 years ago
- Ground: Wiklöf Holding Arena, Mariehamn.
- Capacity: 1,650
- Chairman: Dan Mikkola
- Manager: Roberth Björknesjö
- League: Ykkösliiga
- 2026: Veikkausliiga, 12th of 12 (relegated)
- Website: www.ifkfotboll.ax
Home colours	Away colours

IFK Mariehamn is a Finnish professional football club based in Mariehamn, the capital of the Åland Islands. It plays in the Finnish second Division (Ykkösliiga), winning their first title in 2016. The club plays its home matches at Wiklöf Holding Arena.

== History ==
While IFK Mariehamn was formed in 1919, the sports club did not have a football department until the mid-1930s. Initially, the team participated primarily in local tournaments on Åland, only sporadically playing other Finnish or Swedish teams. The team has participated in the Finnish football leagues since 1945.

Until the 1970s, IFK Mariehamn played primarily in the Finnish football divisions 3 and 4. The club reached a peak in 1975 and 1976, when the club first advanced to division 2 and then reached division 1 (Ykkönen) the following year. After two seasons in division 1, IFK Mariehamn was relegated to division 2, where it would remain up until the 2000s, except for a few seasons in division 3 during the early 1990s.

In 2003, IFK Mariehamn returned to division 1. After only one season in division 1, the club advanced, for the first time in its history to the premier division of Finnish football, the Veikkausliiga, for the 2005 season following qualifying the October 2004 games against FC Jazz. In its first season in the Veikkausliiga, IFK Mariehamn finished 12th out of 14 teams. In 2006, the club finished in 5th place and the year after 6th after an impressive run of unbeaten matches during the autumn of 2007.

In addition to playing in the Veikkausliiga, IFK Mariehamn participates in local Åland tournaments, having won the Åland cup 40 times and the Åland football championships 42 times. In recent years, the club has been the most dominant football team on Åland, having in 2008 won its 11th and 15th straight titles in these two events, respectively.

In 2009, IFK Mariehamn started its first season as a fully professional football club. In 2015, the team won the Finnish Cup for the first time.

On 23 October 2016, IFK Mariehamn defeated FC Ilves 2–1 to secure the first ever Veikkausliiga Championship for the island club. In the 2017–18 season, IFK played its first-ever two-match UEFA Champions League qualification, where it was knocked out by Poland's champion Legia Warsaw.

The title in 2016 was seen as something "impossible" and well beyond what the club ever could have dreamt of, as their economic resources were well below the bigger clubs on the mainland, and the fact that Åland has 30,000 inhabitants as well as the fact that the squad uses the ferries to travel to away games.

=== Stadium ===
IFK Mariehamn plays its home matches at the Wiklöf Holding Arena.

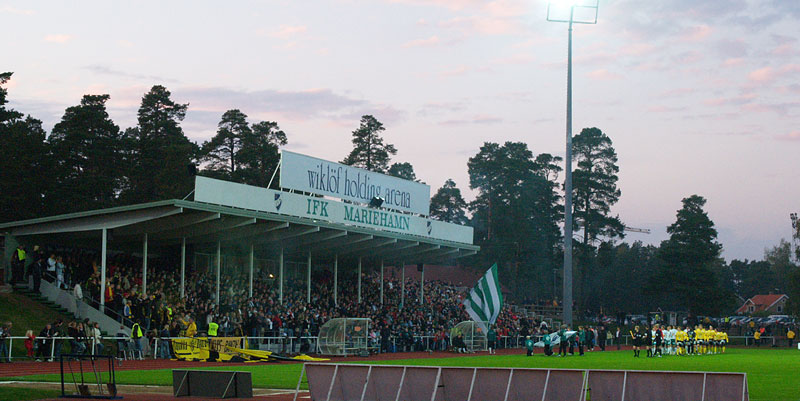
Wiklöf Holding Arena

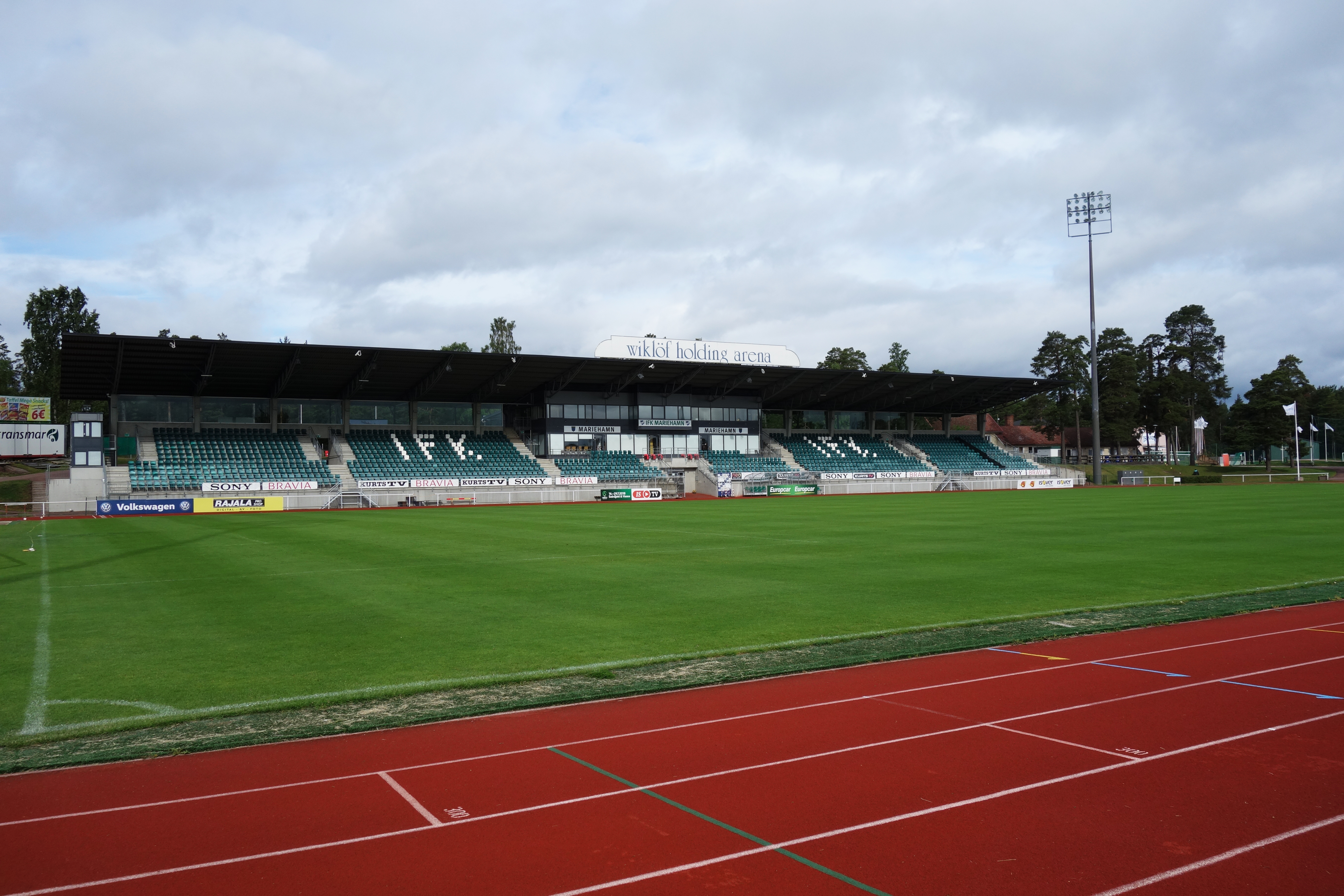
The pitch and the main stand

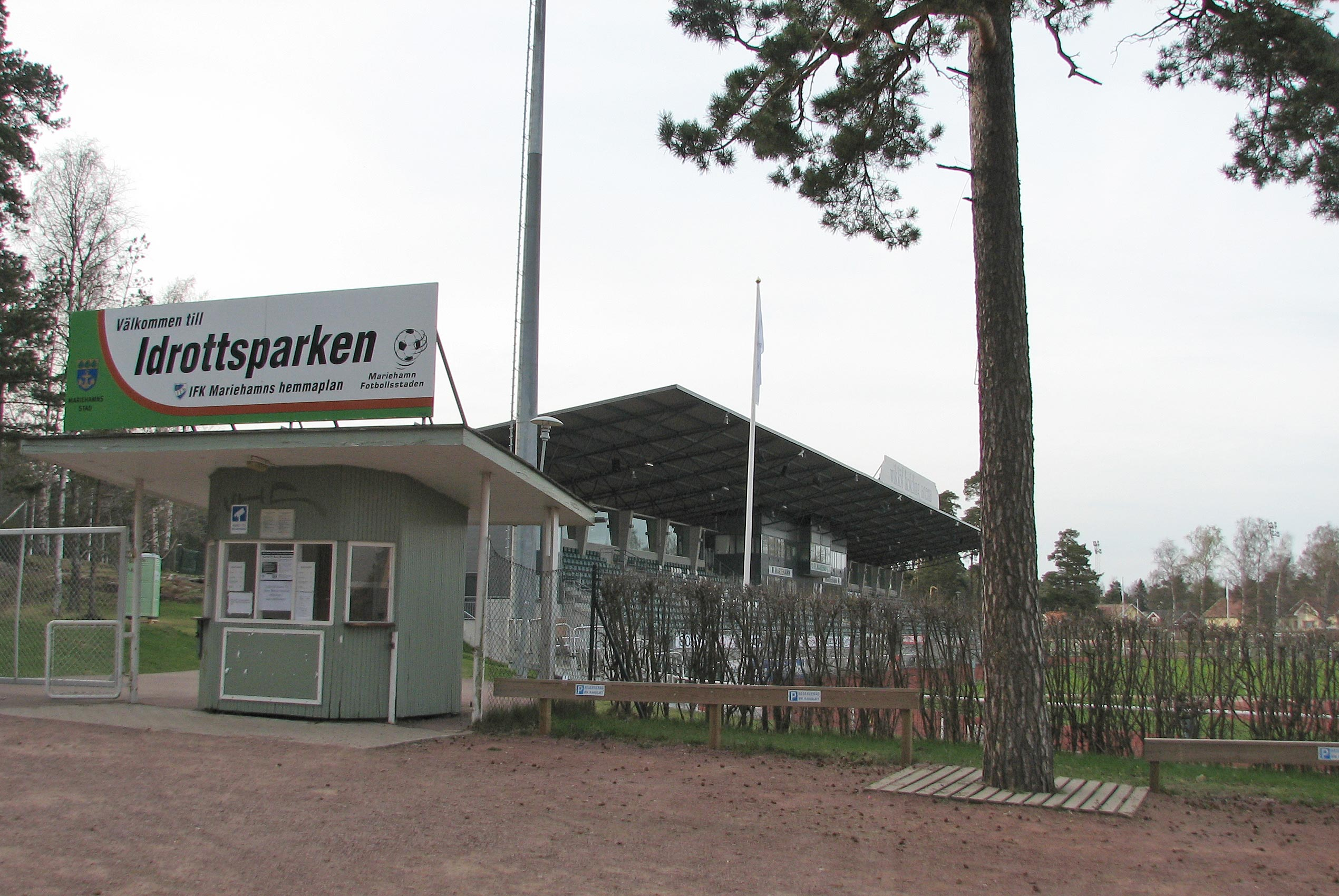
The main entrance of Wiklöf Holding Arena

=== Domestic history ===
- 1945–1971: Kolmonen and Nelonen (two seasons)
- 1972: Kakkonen
- 1973–1975: Kolmonen
- 1976: Kakkonen
- 1977–1978: Ykkönen
- 1979–1990: Kakkonen
- 1991–1992: Kolmonen
- 1993–2003: Kakkonen
- 2004: Ykkönen
- 2005–2026: Veikkausliiga (Premier League)
- 2027–present: Ykkösliiga

Season to Season

Season	Level	Division	Section	Administration	Position	Movements
1945	Tier 1	Cup-Competition	Cup format	Finnish FA (Suomen Palloliitto)	Round of 32	
1945-46	Tier 3	Maakuntasarja (Third Division)	South-West Finland Group	Finnish FA (Suomen Palloliitto)	4th	
1946-47	Tier 3	Maakuntasarja (Third Division)	South-West Finland Group	Finnish FA (Suomen Palloliitto)	3rd	
1947-48	Tier 3	Maakuntasarja (Third Division)	South-West Finland Group	Finnish FA (Suomen Palloliitto)	3rd	
1948	Tier 4	Piirinsarja (District League)	Åland Islands			Promotion Playoff
1949	Tier 4	Piirinsarja (District League)	Åland Islands			Promotion Playoff - Promoted
1950	Tier 3	Maakuntasarja (Third Division)	South Group B	Finnish FA (Suomen Palloliitto)	5th	
1951	Tier 3	Maakuntasarja (Third Division)	West Group A	Finnish FA (Suomen Palloliitto)	6th	Relegated
1952	Tier 4	Piirinsarja (District League)	Åland Islands			Promotion Playoff - Promoted
1953	Tier 3	Maakuntasarja (Third Division)	West Group A	Finnish FA (Suomen Palloliitto)	5th	
1954	Tier 3	Maakuntasarja (Third Division)	West Group II	Finnish FA (Suomen Palloliitto)	9th	Relegated
1955-1958		District leagues				
1959	Tier 3	Maakuntasarja (Third Division)	Group 3 Turku & Åland Islands	Finnish FA (Suomen Palloliitto)	7th	
1958	Tier 4	Aluesarja (Fourth Division)	Group 6 Turku & Åland Islands	Finnish FA (Suomen Palloliitto)	1st	Promoted
1959	Tier 3	Maakuntasarja (Third Division)	Group 3 Turku & Åland Islands	Finnish FA (Suomen Palloliitto)	7th	
1960	Tier 3	Maakuntasarja (Third Division)	Group 3 Turku & Åland Islands	Finnish FA (Suomen Palloliitto)	3rd	
1961	Tier 3	Maakuntasarja (Third Division)	Group 2 Turku & Åland Islands	Finnish FA (Suomen Palloliitto)	4th	
1962	Tier 3	Maakuntasarja (Third Division)	Group 1 Turku & Åland Islands	Finnish FA (Suomen Palloliitto)	3rd	
1963	Tier 3	Maakuntasarja (Third Division)	Group 2 Turku & Åland Islands	Finnish FA (Suomen Palloliitto)	4th	
1964	Tier 3	Maakuntasarja (Third Division)	Group 3 Turku & Åland Islands	Finnish FA (Suomen Palloliitto)	8th	Relegated
1965	Tier 4	Aluesarja (Fourth Division)	Group 5 Åland Islands	Finnish FA (Suomen Palloliitto)	1st	Promoted
1966	Tier 3	Maakuntasarja (Third Division)	Group 4 Turku & Åland Islands	Finnish FA (Suomen Palloliitto)	4th	
1967	Tier 3	Maakuntasarja (Third Division)	Group 3 Turku & Åland Islands	Finnish FA (Suomen Palloliitto)	2nd	
1968	Tier 3	Maakuntasarja (Third Division)	Group 3 Turku & Åland Islands	Finnish FA (Suomen Palloliitto)	5th	
1969	Tier 3	Maakuntasarja (Third Division)	Group 3 Satakunta, Turku & Åland Islands	Finnish FA (Suomen Palloliitto)	5th	
1970	Tier 3	III Divisioona (Third Division)	Group 3 Satakunta, Turku & Åland Islands	Finnish FA (Suomen Palloliitto)	3rd	
1971	Tier 3	III Divisioona (Third Division)	Group 2 Turku & Åland Islands	Finnish FA (Suomen Palloliitto)	1st	Promoted
1972	Tier 2	II Divisioona (Second Division)	West Group	Finnish FA (Suomen Palloliitto)	12th	Due to new league system relegated 2 levels
1973	Tier 4	III Divisioona (Third Division)	Group 3	Turku & Åland Islands District (SPL Turku)	3rd	
1974	Tier 4	III Divisioona (Third Division)	Group 3	Turku & Åland Islands District (SPL Turku)	2nd	
1975	Tier 4	III Divisioona (Third Division)	Group 3	Turku & Åland Islands District (SPL Turku)	1st	Promoted
1976	Tier 3	II Divisioona (Second Division)	West Group	Finnish FA (Suomen Palloliitto)	1st	Promoted
1977	Tier 2	I Divisioona (First Division)		Finnish FA (Suomen Palloliitto)	8th	
1978	Tier 2	I Divisioona (First Division)		Finnish FA (Suomen Palloliitto)	10th	Relegated
1979	Tier 3	II Divisioona (Second Division)	West Group	Finnish FA (Suomen Palloliitto)	3rd	
1980	Tier 3	II Divisioona (Second Division)	West Group	Finnish FA (Suomen Palloliitto)	5th	
1981	Tier 3	II Divisioona (Second Division)	West Group	Finnish FA (Suomen Palloliitto)	7th	
1982	Tier 3	II Divisioona (Second Division)	West Group	Finnish FA (Suomen Palloliitto)	8th	
1983	Tier 3	II Divisioona (Second Division)	West Group	Finnish FA (Suomen Palloliitto)	12th	Relegated
1984	Tier 4	III Divisioona (Third Division)	Group 3	Turku & Åland Islands District (SPL Turku)	1st	Promotion Playoff - Promoted
1985	Tier 3	II Divisioona (Second Division)	West Group	Finnish FA (Suomen Palloliitto)	4th	
1986	Tier 3	II Divisioona (Second Division)	West Group	Finnish FA (Suomen Palloliitto)	11th	Relegated
1987	Tier 4	III Divisioona (Third Division)	Group 3	Turku & Åland Islands District (SPL Turku)	2nd	
1988	Tier 4	III Divisioona (Third Division)	Group 3	Turku & Åland Islands District (SPL Turku)	1st	Promotion rematch - Promoted
1989	Tier 3	II Divisioona (Second Division)	West Group	Finnish FA (Suomen Palloliitto)	4th	
1990	Tier 3	II Divisioona (Second Division)	West Group	Finnish FA (Suomen Palloliitto)	10th	Relegated
1991	Tier 4	III Divisioona (Third Division)	Group 3	Turku & Åland Islands District (SPL Turku)	2nd	
1992	Tier 4	III Divisioona (Third Division)	Group 3	Turku & Åland Islands District (SPL Turku)	1st	Promoted
1993	Tier 3	Kakkonen (Second Division)	West Group	Finnish FA (Suomen Palloliitto)	4th	
1994	Tier 3	Kakkonen (Second Division)	West Group	Finnish FA (Suomen Palloliitto)	4th	
1995	Tier 3	Kakkonen (Second Division)	South Group	Finnish FA (Suomen Palloliitto)	9th	
1996	Tier 3	Kakkonen (Second Division)	South Group	Finnish FA (Suomen Palloliitto)	7th	
1997	Tier 3	Kakkonen (Second Division)	South Group	Finnish FA (Suomen Palloliitto)	5th	
1998	Tier 3	Kakkonen (Second Division)	South Group	Finnish FA (Suomen Palloliitto)	8th	
1999	Tier 3	Kakkonen (Second Division)	West Group	Finnish FA (Suomen Palloliitto)	2nd	
2000	Tier 3	Kakkonen (Second Division)	West Group	Finnish FA (Suomen Palloliitto)	6th	
2001	Tier 3	Kakkonen (Second Division)	South Group	Finnish FA (Suomen Palloliitto)	4th	
2002	Tier 3	Kakkonen (Second Division)	South Group	Finnish FA (Suomen Palloliitto)	5th	
2003	Tier 3	Kakkonen (Second Division)	South Group	Finnish FA (Suomen Palloliitto)	2nd	Play-offs – Promoted
2004	Tier 2	Ykkönen (First Division)		Finnish FA (Suomen Palloliitto)	2nd	Play-offs – Promoted
2005	Tier 1	Veikkausliiga (Premier League)		Finnish FA (Suomen Palloliitto)	12th	
2006	Tier 1	Veikkausliiga (Premier League)		Finnish FA (Suomen Palloliitto)	5th	
2007	Tier 1	Veikkausliiga (Premier League)		Finnish FA (Suomen Palloliitto)	6th	
2008	Tier 1	Veikkausliiga (Premier League)		Finnish FA (Suomen Palloliitto)	12th	
2009	Tier 1	Veikkausliiga (Premier League)		Finnish FA (Suomen Palloliitto)	4th	
2010	Tier 1	Veikkausliiga (Premier League)		Finnish FA (Suomen Palloliitto)	12th	
2011	Tier 1	Veikkausliiga (Premier League)		Finnish FA (Suomen Palloliitto)	7th	
2012	Tier 1	Veikkausliiga (Premier League)		Finnish FA (Suomen Palloliitto)	4th	
2013	Tier 1	Veikkausliiga (Premier League)		Finnish FA (Suomen Palloliitto)	4th	
2014	Tier 1	Veikkausliiga (Premier League)		Finnish FA (Suomen Palloliitto)	5th	
2015	Tier 1	Veikkausliiga (Premier League)		Finnish FA (Suomen Palloliitto)	6th	
2016	Tier 1	Veikkausliiga (Premier League)		Finnish FA (Suomen Palloliitto)	1st	Champions
2017	Tier 1	Veikkausliiga (Premier League)		Finnish FA (Suomen Palloliitto)	5th	
2018	Tier 1	Veikkausliiga (Premier League)		Finnish FA (Suomen Palloliitto)	10th	
2019	Tier 1	Veikkausliiga (Premier League)		Finnish FA (Suomen Palloliitto)	6th	
2020	Tier 1	Veikkausliiga (Premier League)		Finnish FA (Suomen Palloliitto)	9th	
2021	Tier 1	Veikkausliiga (Premier League)		Finnish FA (Suomen Palloliitto)	10th	
2022	Tier 1	Veikkausliiga (Premier League)		Finnish FA (Suomen Palloliitto)	10th	
2023	Tier 1	Veikkausliiga (Premier League)		Finnish FA (Suomen Palloliitto)	11th	Relegation play-offs
2024	Tier 1	Veikkausliiga (Premier League)		Finnish FA (Suomen Palloliitto)	10th	

- 20 seasons in Veikkausliiga
- 4 season in Ykkönen
- 41 seasons in Kakkonen
- 13 seasons in Kolmonen

=== European history ===
Season	Competition	Round	Club	Home	Away	Aggregate
2013–14	UEFA Europa League	1QR	(Azerbaijan) Inter Baku	0–2	1–1	1–3
2016–17	UEFA Europa League	1QR	(Norway) Odds BK	1–1	0–2	1–3
2017–18	UEFA Champions League	2QR	(Poland) Legia Warsaw	0–3	0–6	0–9

Notes

- 1QR: First qualifying round
- 2QR: Second qualifying round

== Current squad ==
As of 24 July 2026

Note: Flags indicate national team as defined under FIFA eligibility rules; some limited exceptions apply. Players may hold more than one non-FIFA nationality.

No.	Pos.	Nation	Player
1	GK	SWE	Kevin Lund
2	DF	FIN	Noah Nurmi
3	DF	FIN	Aaro Soiniemi
4	DF	SWE	Karl Ward (on loan from KuPS)
5	DF	FIN	Tuomas Koivisto
7	FW	SWE	Adam Larsson
8	MF	NED	Jelle van der Heyden
9	FW	FIN	Wille Nuñez
10	MF	FIN	Sebastian Dahlström
11	MF	SWE	Jonathan Svedberg
12	GK	FIN	Oliver Heino
14	MF	FIN	Arvid Bergvik
16	MF	FIN	Anttoni Huttunen
17	MF	FIN	Rasmus Holmberg

No.	Pos.	Nation	Player
18	DF	SWE	Adam Stroud (on loan from Brommapojkarna)
19	FW	NOR	Thomas Klemetsen Jakobsen
20	MF	FIN	Emmanuel Patut
21	FW	FIN	Arvid Lundberg
22	FW	POR	Rui Monteiro
23	MF	SWE	Viktor Widlund
26	MF	FIN	Milton Jansson
27	DF	SWE	Ludvig Richtnér (on loan from Elfsborg)
28	DF	FIN	Jiri Nissinen
31	DF	ZAM	Samson Ngulube
32	GK	FIN	Matias Riikonen
43	FW	FIN	Leo Andersson
53	DF	GHA	Foster Gyamfi
64	MF	FIN	Marlo Hyvönen

=== On loan ===
Note: Flags indicate national team as defined under FIFA eligibility rules; some limited exceptions apply. Players may hold more than one non-FIFA nationality.

No.	Pos.	Nation	Player

=== IFK Mariehamn II ===
|IFK Mariehamn II plays in Kolmonen for the 2026 season Note: Flags indicate national team as defined under FIFA eligibility rules; some limited exceptions apply. Players may hold more than one non-FIFA nationality.

No.	Pos.	Nation	Player
—	DF	AXL	Amir Oujlouq
—	MF	AXL	Oliver Jansson
—	MF	AXL	Ola Melander
—		AXL	Valter Enberg
—		AXL	Algot Fyrqvist
—	DF	AXL	Marcus Andersson
—	MF	AXL	Nils Fonsell
—	MF	AXL	Hjalmar Nyholm
—	DF	AXL	Ludwig Wallén
—	MF	AXL	Samuli Louhema

No.	Pos.	Nation	Player
—	DF	USA	Max Peterson
—	MF	AXL	Hampus Dahlgren
—	GK	AXL	Jens Lundell
—	MF	AXL	Otto Pajunen
—	GK	AXL	Anton Gustafsson
—		AXL	Linus Kankkonen
—	MF	AXL	Wilmer Lundberg
—	MF	AXL	Benjamin Flöjt
—	MF	GHA	Usman Hussein Suleman

== Former players ==
All following players who have represented IFK Mariehamn have been capped at least once by their respective national team's first squad.

- (Armenia) Ivan Yagan
- (Canada) Charlie Trafford
- (Canada) Mason Trafford
- (Estonia) Lembit Rajala
- (Estonia) Andreas Vaikla
- (Finland) Paulus Arajuuri
- (Finland) Sebastian Dahlström
- (Finland) Peter Enckelman
- (Finland) Daniel Enqvist
- (Finland) (Åland) Anders Eriksson
- (Finland) | (Åland) Michael Fonsell
- (Finland) Petteri Forsell
- (Finland) Albin Granlund
- (Finland) (Åland) Mikael Granskog
- (Finland) Kristian Kojola
- (Finland) Niilo Kujasalo
- (Finland) Johannes Laaksonen
- (Finland) Pekka Lagerblom
- (Finland) Toni Lehtinen
- (Finland) (Åland) Jani Lyyski
- (Finland) Niilo Mäenpää
- (Finland) Juho Mäkelä
- (Finland) Mikko Paatelainen
- (Finland) Akseli Pelvas
- (Finland) Robin Sid
- (Finland) (Åland) Daniel Sjölund
- (Finland) Sebastian Strandvall
- (Finland) Mikko Sumusalo
- (Finland) Kalle Taimi
- (Finland) Walter Viitala
- (Finland) (Åland) Oscar Wiklöf
- (Finland) Saku Ylätupa
- (Ghana) Mohammed Abubakari
- (Ghana) Yussif Chibsah
- (Ghana) Baba Mensah
- (Jamaica) Alanzo Adlam
- (Jamaica) Dever Orgill
- (Kenya) Anthony Dafaa
- (Kenya) Amos Ekhalie
- (Kenya) Willis Ochieng
- (New Zealand) Kris Bright
- (Niger) Mamane Amadou Sabo
- (Nigeria) John Owoeri
- (Philippines) Amin Nazari
- (Saudi Arabia) Abdulfattah Asiri
- (Senegal) Emile Paul Tendeng
- (Sierra Leone) Samuel Barlay
- (Zambia) Clive Hachilensa
- (Canada) Yann Fillion

=== Fans' Player of the Year ===
- 2005: (Sweden) David Carlsson
- 2006: (Finland) Antti Kuismala
- 2007: (Åland) Mika Niskala
- 2008: (Sweden) Mattias Wiklöf
- 2009: (Finland) Paulus Arajuuri
- 2010: (Hungary) Tamas Gruborovics
- 2011: (Finland) Kristian Kojola
- 2012: (Sweden) Simon Nurme
- 2013: (Finland) Otso Virtanen
- 2014: (Argentina) Luis Solignac
- 2015: (Brazil) Diego Assis
- 2016: (Jamaica) Dever Orgill
- 2017: (Finland) Robin Sid
- 2018: (Sweden) Gabriel Petrovic
- 2019: (Netherlands) Rick Ketting
- 2020: (Finland) Oskari Forsman
- 2021: (Finland) Oskari Forsman (2)
- 2022: (Finland) Robin Sid (2)
- 2023: (Finland) Robin Sid (3)
- 2024: (Sweden) Adam Larsson
- 2025: (Finland) Niilo Kujasalo
- 2026: (Sweden) Kevin Lund

== Management and boardroom ==
=== Management ===
As of 20 January 2021

Name	Role
(Sweden) Roberth Björknesjö	Head coach
(Finland) Daniel Sjölund	Assistant coach
(Finland) Johan Sundman	Goalkeeping coach
(Sweden) Philip Garvö	Fitness Coach
(Finland) Anton Koli	Fitness Coach
(Finland) Malin Ringbom	Doctor
(Sweden) Daniel Norrmén	Reserve coach

==== Managerial history ====
- (Finland) Pekka Lyyski (2003–2015)
- (Finland) Kari Virtanen (2016)
- (Åland) Peter Lundberg (2016–2019)
- (Sweden) Lukas Syberyjski (2020–2021)
- (Sweden) Daniel Norrmén (2021–2023)
- (Finland) Jimmy Wargh (2023, interim)
- (Portugal) Bruno Romão (2024)
- (England) Gary Williams (2024–2026)
- (Finland) Jimmy Wargh (2026, interim)
- (Sweden) Roberth Björknesjö (2026–)

=== Boardroom ===
As of 11 April 2017

Name	Role
(Finland) Dan Mikkola	Chairman
(Finland) Jimmy Wargh	CEO & Club director

== Honours ==
- Veikkausliiga
  - Champions: 2016
- Finnish Cup
  - Winners: 2015
  - Runners-up: 2019
