= Åland Football Association =

- Abbreviation: ÅFF
- Founded: 1943
- Headquarters: Mariehamn
- Chairman: Krille Mattsson
- Website: http://www.fotboll.ax

The Åland Football Association (Swedish: Ålands Fotbollförbund) is the governing body of football in Åland. ÅFF is not a member of UEFA or FIFA, but is a member of the Football Association of Finland and has the status of a District Football Association. ÅFF also runs the Åland official football team and Åland women's football team.

== Background ==
Åland Football Association was founded in 1943 and was originally called the Ålands Bolldistrikt. The Association currently has 12 member associations of which 11 are football clubs and one is the local referee association. They together have about 60 teams covering various ages groups. The number of registered players is currently approaching the 1000 mark.

== Affiliated Members ==
The following clubs are affiliated to the ÅFF:

- Åland United (women's football club)
- FC Aland
- Hammarlands IK
- IFK Mariehamn
- Jomala IK
- Lemlands IF
- Ålands Fotbolldomare (referee association)

== Presidents Åland Football Association ==
Name	Period
(Åland) Anders Mattsson	1989 - 2009
(Åland) Styrbjörn Oskarsson	2009 - 2012
(Åland) Tony Asumaa	2012 - 2014
(Åland) Krille Mattsson	2014 - Present

== See also ==
- Football in Åland
