= 2016 IFK Mariehamn season =

IFK Mariehamn
2016 season
- Chairman: Robert Söderdahl
- Manager: Peter Lundberg; Kari Virtanen
- Stadium: Wiklöf Holding Arena
- Veikkausliiga: 1st
- Finnish Cup: Sixth Round vs Lahti
- League Cup: Group Stage
- UEFA Europa League: First qualifying round vs Odd
- Top goalscorer: League: Dever Orgill (13); All: Dever Orgill (14)
Home colours	Away colours

The 2016 season is IFK Mariehamn's 12th Veikkausliiga season since their promotion back to the top flight in 2005.

== Squad ==
Note: Flags indicate national team as defined under FIFA eligibility rules; some limited exceptions apply. Players may hold more than one non-FIFA nationality.

No.	Pos.	Nation	Player
1	GK	FIN	Walter Viitala
2	DF	FIN	Albin Granlund
3	DF	FIN	Kristian Kojola
4	MF	SWE	Philip Sparrdal Mantilla
5	FW	JAM	Dever Orgill
7	DF	FIN	Tommy Wirtanen
8	DF	FIN	Jani Lyyski (captain)
9	FW	USA	Brian Span
11	MF	SWE	Josef Ibrahim
14	MF	SWE	Gabriel Petrović

No.	Pos.	Nation	Player
15	MF	KEN	Amos Ekhalie
17	MF	FIN	Robin Sid
18	MF	FIN	Thomas Mäkinen
20	MF	KEN	Anthony Dafaa
25	MF	BRA	Diego Assis
26	MF	FIN	Joel Mattsson
30	GK	FIN	Marc Nordqvist
33	FW	FIN	Aleksei Kangaskolkka
55	DF	SWE	Bobbie Friberg da Cruz
92	GK	SCO	Craig Wight

== Transfers ==
=== Winter ===
In: Note: Flags indicate national team as defined under FIFA eligibility rules; some limited exceptions apply. Players may hold more than one non-FIFA nationality.

No.	Pos.	Nation	Player
14	MF	SWE	Gabriel Petrović (from (Sweden) Brommapojkarna)
92	GK	SCO	Craig Wight

Out: Note: Flags indicate national team as defined under FIFA eligibility rules; some limited exceptions apply. Players may hold more than one non-FIFA nationality.

No.	Pos.	Nation	Player
1	GK	FIN	Otso Virtanen (to (Scotland) Hibernian)
6	MF	FIN	Duarte Tammilehto (to (Finland) Lahti)
10	MF	FIN	Petteri Forsell (to (Poland) Miedź Legnica)

=== Summer ===
In: Note: Flags indicate national team as defined under FIFA eligibility rules; some limited exceptions apply. Players may hold more than one non-FIFA nationality.

No.	Pos.	Nation	Player

Out: Note: Flags indicate national team as defined under FIFA eligibility rules; some limited exceptions apply. Players may hold more than one non-FIFA nationality.

No.	Pos.	Nation	Player

== Competitions ==
=== Veikkausliiga ===
==== League table ====
Pos	Team	Pld	W	D	L	GF	GA	GD	Pts	Qualification or relegation
1	IFK Mariehamn (C)	33	17	10	6	40	25	+15	61	Qualification for the Champions League second qualifying round
2	HJK	33	16	10	7	52	36	+16	58	Qualification for the Europa League first qualifying round (Note: SJK qualified for the Europa League first qualifying round by winning the 2016 Finnish Cup.)
3	SJK	33	17	6	10	49	36	+13	57	Qualification for the Europa League first qualifying round
4	VPS	33	15	8	10	36	27	+9	53	Qualification for the Europa League first qualifying round
5	Ilves	33	15	7	11	36	35	+1	52	

Source: Veikkausliiga (in Finnish), Soccerway
Rules for classification: 1) Points; 2) Goal difference; 3) Goals scored; 4) Head-to-head points; 5) Head-to-head goal difference; 6) Head-to-head away goals scored; 7) Play-off
(Note: Play-off is only played if need to decide champion, teams for relegation or UEFA competition and will be played on a neutral ground).
(C) Champions

==== Results summary ====
Overall								Home						Away					
Pld	W	D	L	GF	GA	GD	Pts	W	D	L	GF	GA	GD	W	D	L	GF	GA	GD
32	16	10	6	40	25	+15	58	8	6	2	23	15	+8	8	4	4	17	10	+7

Last updated: 24 October 2016.
Source: See Results

==== Results by matchday ====
Round	1	2	3	4	5	6	7	8	9	10	11	12	13	14	15	16	17	18	19	20	21	22	23	24	25	26	27	28	29	30	31	32	33
Ground	A	H	A	A	H	A	H	A	H	A	H	H	A	H	H	H	A	H	A	H	A	A	H	H	A	H	A	H	A	H	A	A	H
Result	L	W	W	W	D	W	D	W	W	W	L	D	D	W	W	W	W	D	D	L	L	W	W	D	L	W	L	D	D	W	D	W	W

Updated to match(es) played on 24 October 2016. Source: See results
A = Away; H = Home; W = Win; D = Draw; L = Loss

==== Results ====
2 April 2016 1	HJK	2 – 0	IFK Mariehamn	Helsinki
14:00 EEST (UTC+3)	Rexhepi (yellow card) 55'; Tanaka 68', 84'; Tatomirović (yellow card) 70'	Report	Ekhalie (yellow card) 19'; Lyyski (yellow card) 56'	Stadium: Sonera Stadium; Attendance: 5,251; Referee: Ville Nevalainen

9 April 2016 2	IFK Mariehamn	1 – 0	RoPS	Mariehamn
16:00 EEST (UTC+3)	Wirtanen (yellow card) 43'; Sid (yellow card) 48'; Orgill 53'	Report	J.Saksela (yellow card) 17'	Stadium: Wiklöf Holding Arena; Attendance: 1,146; Referee: Petri Viljanen

14 April 2016 3	SJK	0 – 1	IFK Mariehamn	Seinäjoki
18:30 EEST (UTC+3)	T.Penninkangas (yellow card) 33'	Report	Orgill 25'; Mantilla (yellow card) 42'	Stadium: Seinäjoen keskuskenttä Attendance: 2,115; Referee: Marko Grönholm

17 April 2016 4	PS Kemi	1 – 2	IFK Mariehamn	Kemi
15:00 EEST (UTC+3)	Kaby 55' (yellow card) 90+3'	Report	Assis 15'; Orgill 59'; Ekhalie (yellow card) 83'; Span (yellow card) 90+1'	Stadium: Sauvosaaren Urheilupuisto; Attendance: 488; Referee: Antti Munukka

24 April 2016 5	IFK Mariehamn	0 – 0	HJK	Mariehamn
16:30 EEST (UTC+3)	Dafaa (yellow card) 41'; Span (yellow card) 72'	Report	Alho (yellow card) 31'; Rexhepi (yellow card) 89'; A. Halme (yellow card) 90+4'	Stadium: Wiklöf Holding Arena; Attendance: 1,118; Referee: Jari Järvinen

29 April 2016 6	Ilves	0 – 1	IFK Mariehamn	Tampere
18:30 EEST (UTC+3)	Lahtinen (yellow card) 73'; Hilander (yellow card) 78'	Report	Dafaa 7'; Lyyski (yellow card) 33'; Assis (yellow card) 45+1'; Kojola (yellow card) 51'	Stadium: Tammelan Stadion; Attendance: 2,613; Referee: Antti Munukka

4 May 2016 7	IFK Mariehamn	0 – 0	PK-35 Vantaa	Mariehamn
18:30 EEST (UTC+3)	Ibrahim (yellow card) 34'; Petrović (yellow card) 43'	Report	F.Liñán (yellow card) 34'	Stadium: Wiklöf Holding Arena; Attendance: 1,215; Referee: Marko Grönholm

9 May 2016 8	Inter Turku	0 – 2	IFK Mariehamn	Turku
18:00 EEST (UTC+3)	Mannström (yellow card) 38'	Report	Orgill 29', 52'	Stadium: Veritas Stadion; Attendance: 2,036; Referee: Dennis Antamo

15 May 2016 9	IFK Mariehamn	3 – 0	Lahti	Mariehamn
18:30 EEST (UTC+3)	Span 10'; Lyyski 24'; Orgill 58'	Report		Stadium: Wiklöf Holding Arena; Attendance: 766; Referee: Petri Viljanen

20 May 2016 10	HIFK	0 – 1	IFK Mariehamn	Helsinki
18:30 EEST (UTC+3)		Report	Petrović (yellow card) 35'; Assis 57'; Span (yellow card) 90+2'	Stadium: Sonera Stadium; Attendance: 2,511; Referee: Marko Grönholm

25 May 2016 11	IFK Mariehamn	0 – 3	KuPS	Mariehamn
18:30 EEST (UTC+3)	Mantilla (yellow card) 80'; Kangaskolkka (yellow card) 89'	Report	Diallo 25'; Egwuekwe 44'; Salami 54'	Stadium: Wiklöf Holding Arena; Attendance: 1,392; Referee: Jani Laaksonen

29 May 2016 12	IFK Mariehamn	2 – 2	VPS	Mariehamn
18:30 EEST (UTC+3)	Assis 9'; Sid 40'; Lyyski (yellow card) 48'; Kangaskolkka (yellow card) 75'	Report	L.Hertsi (yellow card) 39'; P.Soiri 59'; E.Tamminen 90+3'	Stadium: Wiklöf Holding Arena; Attendance: 1,103; Referee: Jari Järvinen

9 June 2016 13	RoPS	0 – 0	IFK Mariehamn	Rovaniemi
18:30 EEST (UTC+3)	Kokko (yellow card) 41'; Saxman (yellow card) 63'; J.Hämäläinen (yellow card) 90+2'	Report	T.Mäkinen (yellow card) 89'	Stadium: Rovaniemen keskuskenttä Attendance: 1,276; Referee: Dennis Antamo

12 June 2016 14	IFK Mariehamn	1 – 0	SJK	Mariehamn
13:30 EEST (UTC+3)	Assis 61'; Lyyski (yellow card) 70'; Petrović (yellow card) 76'	Report	Hurme (yellow card) 17'; Klinga (yellow card) 44'; Dorman (yellow card) 64'	Stadium: Wiklöf Holding Arena; Attendance: 861; Referee: Oskari Hämäläinen

19 June 2016 15	IFK Mariehamn	2 – 0	PS Kemi	Mariehamn
18:30 EEST (UTC+3)	Orgill 45'; Kangaskolkka 89'	Report		Stadium: Wiklöf Holding Arena; Attendance: 2,257; Referee: Marko Grönholm

10 July 2016 16	IFK Mariehamn	3 – 1	Ilves	Mariehamn
17:00 EEST (UTC+3)	Kangaskolkka 16' (pen.); Ekhalie (yellow card) 59'; Lyyski 66'; Ibrahim 73'; Assis (yellow card) 77'; Petrović (yellow card) 86'; Viitala (yellow card) 90+3'; Sid (yellow card) 90+4'	Report	Hilander (yellow card) 15'; Ayarna (yellow card) 17'; Hilska 27'; T.Siira (yellow card) 67'	Stadium: Wiklöf Holding Arena; Attendance: 1,256; Referee: Jari Järvinen

17 July 2016 17	PK-35 Vantaa	0 – 2	IFK Mariehamn	Vantaa
18:30 EEST (UTC+3)	Ristola (yellow card) 43'	Report	Orgill 12'; Lyyski 38'; Mantilla (yellow card) 63'; Viitala (yellow card) 84'	Stadium: Myyrmäen jalkapallostadion Attendance: 1,098; Referee: Dennis Antamo

25 July 2016 18	IFK Mariehamn	0 – 0	Inter Turku	Mariehamn
18:30 EEST (UTC+3)		Report	E.Belica (yellow card) 41'; Nyman (yellow card) 68'; A.Hoskonen (yellow card) 90'	Stadium: Wiklöf Holding Arena; Attendance: 1,607; Referee: Mikko Mörö

31 July 2016 19	Lahti	1 – 1	IFK Mariehamn	Lahti
18:30 EEST (UTC+3)	S.Hostikka 40'; Tammilehto (yellow card) 61'	Report	Ekhalie 9'; Orgill (yellow card) 64'; Kojola (yellow card) 69'; Kangaskolkka (yellow card) 85'	Stadium: Lahti Stadium; Attendance: 1,925; Referee: Atte Jussila

7 August 2016 20	IFK Mariehamn	2 – 5	HIFK	Mariehamn
18:30 EEST (UTC+3)	Orgill 26', 40'; Lyyski (yellow card) 71'	Report	Sihvola 9', 54', 90'; Salmikivi 79'	Stadium: Wiklöf Holding Arena; Attendance: 1,462; Referee: Toni Pohjoismäki

10 August 2016 21	KuPS	1 – 0	IFK Mariehamn	Kuopio
18:30 EEST (UTC+3)	Salami 32' (pen.); S.Savolainen (yellow card) 73'	Report		Stadium: Kuopio Football Stadium; Attendance: 2,087; Referee: Dennis Antamo

14 August 2016 22	VPS	0 – 2	IFK Mariehamn	Vaasa
18:30 EEST (UTC+3)	Morrissey (yellow card) 28' (yellow-red card) 48'	Report	Kojola 12'; Mäkinen 90+1'	Stadium: Hietalahti Stadium; Attendance: 2,321; Referee: Antti Munukka

21 August 2016 23	IFK Mariehamn	1 – 0	HIFK	Mariehamn
18:30 EEST (UTC+3)	Orgill (yellow card) 42'; Kangaskolkka 47' (pen.); Span (yellow card) 88'	Report	Maanoja (yellow card) 46'; Väyrynen (yellow card) 80'; Gela (yellow card) 82'	Stadium: Wiklöf Holding Arena; Attendance: 1,205; Referee: Kalle Mäkinen

28 August 2016 24	IFK Mariehamn	0 – 0	VPS	Mariehamn
18:30 EEST (UTC+3)	Mäkinen (yellow card) 53'	Report	J.Engström (yellow card) 90+2'	Stadium: Wiklöf Holding Arena; Attendance: 1,305; Referee: Antti Munukka

9 September 2016 25	KuPS	2 – 1	IFK Mariehamn	Kuopio
18:30 EEST (UTC+3)	Salami 57' (pen.), 63'; Egwuekwe (yellow card) 86'	Report	Kangaskolkka 59' (yellow card) 80'	Stadium: Kuopio Football Stadium; Attendance: 2,621; Referee: Kalle Mäkinen

12 September 2016 26	IFK Mariehamn	1 – 0	PS Kemi	Mariehamn
18:30 EEST (UTC+3)	Span 12' (yellow card) 55'; Kangaskolkka (yellow card) 29'; Petrović (yellow card) 86'	Report	Gilligan (yellow card) 32'; Veteli (yellow card) 60'; Vilmunen (yellow card) 90+1'	Stadium: Wiklöf Holding Arena; Attendance: 1,608; Referee: Antti Munukka

17 September 2016 27	SJK	1 – 0	IFK Mariehamn	Seinäjoki
16:00 EEST (UTC+3)	Vasara 84'	Report	Lyyski (yellow card) 41'	Stadium: Seinäjoen keskuskenttä Attendance: 3,839; Referee: Ville Nevalainen

21 September 2016 28	IFK Mariehamn	1 – 1	Inter Turku	Mariehamn
18:30 EEST (UTC+3)	Orgill 33'; Lyyski (yellow card) 78'	Report	Kuqi 12' (yellow card) 75'	Stadium: Wiklöf Holding Arena; Referee: Petri Viljanen

25 September 2016 29	RoPS	1 – 1	IFK Mariehamn	Rovaniemi
18:30 EEST (UTC+3)	Saksela 35'; Jammeh (yellow card) 42'; J.Hämäläinen (yellow card) 90+3'	Report	Assis 2' (yellow card) 79'; Span (yellow card) 28'	Stadium: Rovaniemen keskuskenttä Attendance: 1,933; Referee: Antti Munukka

2 October 2016 30	IFK Mariehamn	4 – 2	PK-35 Vantaa	Mariehamn
18:30 EEST (UTC+3)	Kangaskolkka 34'; Orgill 55'; Ibrahim 72'; Lyyski 85'	Report	M.Ömer 40'; Kastrati 50'	Stadium: Wiklöf Holding Arena; Attendance: 1,501; Referee: Mattias Gestranius

14 October 2016 31	HJK	1 – 1	IFK Mariehamn	Helsinki
18:30 EEST (UTC+3)	Morelos 27' (yellow card) 89'; Alho (yellow card) 65'	Report	Sparrdal Mantilla (yellow card) 48'; Lyyski (yellow card) 77'; Kangaskolkka 78'	Stadium: Sonera Stadium; Attendance: 9,726; Referee: Mattias Gestranius

17 October 2016 32	Lahti	0 – 2	IFK Mariehamn	Lahti
18:30 EEST (UTC+3)	F.Sadat (yellow card) 41'	Report	Orgill 9'; Lyyski (yellow card) 45' (goal) 85'; Sparrdal Mantilla (yellow card) 59'	Stadium: Lahti Stadium; Attendance: 2,583; Referee: Kalle Mäkinen

23 October 2016 33	IFK Mariehamn	2 – 1	Ilves	Mariehamn
15:00 EEST (UTC+3)	da Cruz 1'; Kangaskolkka (yellow card) 44'; Mantilla (yellow card) 61'; Assis 75'	Report	T.Siira 24' (yellow card) 82'	Stadium: Wiklöf Holding Arena; Attendance: 4,335; Referee: Antti Munukka

=== Finnish Cup ===
26 March 2016 Fifth Round	Legirus Inter	1 – 3 (a.e.t.)	IFK Mariehamn	Vantaa
15:00 EEST (UTC+3)	M.Gasparin (yellow card) 53' (yellow-red card) 72'; Chidi 59'; F.Liñán (yellow card) 90'; Losev (red card) 100'	Report	Ekhalie (yellow card) 8'; Assis (yellow card) 36'; Sid 90+5'; Lyyski (yellow card) 109'; Kangaskolkka 103' (pen.) (yellow card) 119' da Cruz 119'	Stadium: Kalmuuri TN; Attendance: 289; Referee: Oskari Hämäläinen

21 April 2016 Sixth Round	IFK Mariehamn	1 – 2 (a.e.t.)	Lahti	Mariehamn
18:30 EEST (UTC+3)	Orgill 15' (yellow card) 114'; Ibrahim (yellow card) 56'; Mantilla (yellow card) 60'	Report	Multanen 32'; Tanska (yellow card) 57'; I.Solovev (yellow card) 77'; M.Kuningas (yellow card) 98'; Hostikka 102'; Maanoja (yellow card) 113'	Stadium: Wiklöf Holding Arena; Attendance: 840; Referee: Jani Laaksonen

=== League Cup ===
Pos	Team	Pld	W	D	L	GF	GA	GD	Pts	Qualification
1	Lahti	5	2	3	0	7	5	+2	9	Final
2	Inter Turku	5	2	2	1	6	5	+1	8	
3	HJK	5	1	4	0	8	7	+1	7	
4	PK-35 Vantaa	5	1	3	1	5	5	0	6	
5	IFK Mariehamn	5	1	1	3	5	5	0	4	
6	HIFK	5	1	1	3	5	9	−4	4	

Updated to match(es) played on 18 February 2016. Source: veikkausliiga.com
Rules for classification: 1) points; 2) goal difference; 3) number of goals scored; 4) head-to-head points; 5) head-to-head goal difference; 6) goals scored in head-to-head

31 January 2016 1	HJK	1 – 0	IFK Mariehamn	Helsinki
12:15 EET (UTC+2)	Rexhepi (yellow card) 44' (yellow-red card) 60'; Taiwo 70' (pen.)	Report	Petrović (yellow card) 36'; Dafaa (yellow card) 69'; Span (yellow card) 90+4'	Stadium: Talin jalkapallohalli Attendance: 424; Referee: Marko Grönholm

3 February 2016 2	HIFK	1 – 0	IFK Mariehamn	Helsinki
15:30 EET (UTC+2)	Rantanen 90+2'	Report	Petrović (yellow card) 46'; Lyyski (yellow card) 55'; Assis (yellow card) 61'	Stadium: Talin jalkapallohalli Attendance: 213; Referee: Petri Viljanen

8 February 2016 3	IFK Mariehamn	0 – 1	Inter Turku	Åland
19:00 EET (UTC+2)		Report	Gnabouyou 4'	Stadium: Eckeröhallen; Referee: Mattias Gestranius

12 February 2016 4	Lahti	2 – 2	IFK Mariehamn	Lahti
15:00 EET (UTC+2)	Tuominen 13'; Bonilha (yellow card) 25'; Hostikka 64'; Shala (yellow card) 87'	Report	Kangaskolkka (yellow card) 32' (goal) 90'; Dafaa (yellow card) 37'; Span (yellow card) 45'; Ekhalie 68'	Stadium: Lahti Stadium; Attendance: 78; Referee: Petri Viljanen

20 February 2016 5	IFK Mariehamn	3 – 0	PK-35 Vantaa	Åland
18:00 EET (UTC+2)	Kangaskolkka 4'; Mäkinen 15'; Dafaa (yellow card) 17'; Petrović (yellow card) 68'; Ibrahim 73'	Report	Raimi (yellow card) 26'	Stadium: Eckeröhallen; Attendance: 285

=== UEFA Europa League ===
==== Qualifying rounds ====
30 June 2016 First qualifying round 1st leg	Odd (Norway)	2 – 0	(Finland) IFK Mariehamn	Skien, Norway
19:00 CEST (UTC+2)	Grøgaard 63'; Occéan 86'	Report		Stadium: Skagerak Arena; Attendance: 3,701; Referee: Mohammed Al-Hakim (Sweden)

7 July 2016 First qualifying round 2nd leg	IFK Mariehamn (Finland)	1 – 1 (1 – 3 agg.)	(Norway) Odd	Mariehamn, Finland
18:00 CEST (UTC+2)	Mantilla 4'; Kangaskolkka (yellow card) 31'; Kojola (yellow card) 42'; Span (yellow card) 56'	Report	Jensen (yellow card) 40'; Berge (yellow card) 72'; Halvorsen (yellow card) 74'; Bentley 78'	Stadium: Wiklöf Holding Arena; Attendance: 1,402; Referee: Peter Kjærsgaard-Andersen (Denmark)

== Squad statistics ==
As of Match played 23 October 2016

=== Appearances and goals ===
No.	Pos	Nat	Player	Total		Veikkausliiga		Finnish Cup		League Cup		Europa League	
No.	Pos	Nat	Player	Apps	Goals	Apps	Goals	Apps	Goals	Apps	Goals	Apps	Goals
1	GK	(Finland) FIN	Walter Viitala	40	0	33	0	2	0	3	0	2	0
2	DF	(Finland) FIN	Albin Granlund	27	0	20+1	0	0	0	3+1	0	2	0
3	DF	(Finland) FIN	Kristian Kojola	41	1	33	1	2	0	4	0	2	0
4	DF	(Sweden) SWE	Philip Sparrdal Mantilla	36	1	27+2	0	1	0	3+1	0	1+1	1
5	FW	(Jamaica) JAM	Dever Orgill	31	14	27+1	13	1	1	0	0	2	0
7	MF	(Finland) FIN	Tommy Wirtanen	18	0	6+6	0	1	0	3+1	0	0+1	0
8	DF	(Finland) FIN	Jani Lyyski	37	5	29	5	2	0	3+1	0	2	0
9	FW	(United States) USA	Brian Span	40	2	27+4	2	1+1	0	4+1	0	2	0
11	MF	(Sweden) SWE	Josef Ibrahim	21	3	4+11	2	2	0	3+1	1	0	0
14	MF	(Sweden) SWE	Gabriel Petrović	37	0	29	0	2	0	3+1	0	2	0
15	MF	(Kenya) KEN	Amos Ekhalie	39	2	19+12	1	1	0	3+2	1	2	0
17	MF	(Finland) FIN	Robin Sid	29	2	12+10	1	0+2	1	3+1	0	0+1	0
18	MF	(Finland) FIN	Thomas Mäkinen	27	2	4+16	1	2	0	2+2	1	0+1	0
20	MF	(Kenya) KEN	Anthony Dafaa	23	1	17	1	0+1	0	3+1	0	1	0
24	GK	(Finland) FIN	Johan Sundman	1	0	0	0	0	0	0+1	0	0	0
25	MF	(Brazil) BRA	Diego Assis	41	6	24+8	6	2	0	5	0	1+1	0
26	MF	(Finland) FIN	Joel Mattsson	3	0	0+1	0	0	0	0+2	0	0	0
30	GK	(Finland) FIN	Marc Nordqvist	3	0	0	0	0+1	0	1+1	0	0	0
33	FW	(Finland) FIN	Aleksei Kangaskolkka	37	9	22+7	6	2	1	3	2	2+1	0
55	DF	(Sweden) SWE	Bobbie Friberg da Cruz	39	2	28+2	1	1+1	1	4+1	0	2	0
Trialists:
Players who left IFK Mariehamn during the season:

=== Goal scorers ===
Place	Position	Nation	Number	Name	Veikkausliiga	Finnish Cup	League Cup	Europa League	Total
1	FW	(Jamaica)	5	Dever Orgill	13	1	0	0	14
2	FW	(Finland)	33	Aleksei Kangaskolkka	6	1	2	0	9
3	MF	(Brazil)	25	Diego Assis	6	0	0	0	6
4	DF	(Finland)	8	Jani Lyyski	5	0	0	0	5
5	MF	(Sweden)	11	Josef Ibrahim	2	1	0	0	3
6	FW	(United States)	9	Brian Span	2	0	0	0	2
6	MF	(Finland)	17	Robin Sid	1	1	0	0	2
6	MF	(Kenya)	15	Amos Ekhalie	1	1	0	0	2
6	MF	(Finland)	18	Thomas Mäkinen	1	1	0	0	2
6	DF	(Sweden)	55	Bobbie Friberg da Cruz	1	1	0	0	2
11	MF	(Kenya)	20	Anthony Dafaa	1	0	0	0	1
11	DF	(Finland)	3	Kristian Kojola	1	0	0	0	1
11	DF	(Sweden)	4	Philip Sparrdal Mantilla	0	0	0	1	1
TOTALS					40	4	5	1	50

=== Disciplinary record ===
Number	Nation	Position	Name	Veikkausliiga		Finnish Cup		League Cup		Europa League		Total	
Number	Nation	Position	Name	Yellow card	Red card	Yellow card	Red card	Yellow card	Red card	Yellow card	Red card	Yellow card	Red card
1	(Finland)	GK	Walter Viitala	2	0	0	0	0	0	0	0	2	0
3	(Finland)	DF	Kristian Kojola	2	0	0	0	0	0	1	0	3	0
4	(Sweden)	DF	Philip Sparrdal Mantilla	6	0	1	0	0	0	0	0	7	0
5	(Jamaica)	FW	Dever Orgill	2	0	1	0	0	0	0	0	3	0
7	(Finland)	MF	Tommy Wirtanen	1	0	0	0	0	0	0	0	1	0
8	(Finland)	DF	Jani Lyyski	9	0	1	0	1	0	0	0	11	0
9	(United States)	MF	Brian Span	6	0	0	0	2	0	1	0	9	0
11	(Sweden)	MF	Josef Ibrahim	1	0	1	0	0	0	0	0	2	0
14	(Sweden)	MF	Gabriel Petrović	5	0	0	0	3	0	0	0	8	0
15	(Kenya)	MF	Amos Ekhalie	3	0	1	0	0	0	0	0	4	0
17	(Finland)	MF	Robin Sid	2	0	0	0	0	0	0	0	2	0
18	(Finland)	MF	Thomas Mäkinen	2	0	0	0	0	0	0	0	2	0
20	(Kenya)	MF	Anthony Dafaa	1	0	0	0	3	0	0	0	4	0
25	(Brazil)	MF	Diego Assis	3	0	1	0	1	0	0	0	5	0
33	(Finland)	FW	Aleksei Kangaskolkka	6	0	1	0	1	0	1	0	9	0
TOTALS				51	0	7	0	11	0	3	0	72	0
