= Anders Överström =

Finnish footballer (born 1985)

Personal information
- Full name: Anders Överström
- Date of birth: 25 November 1985 (age 40)
- Place of birth: Mariehamn, Finland
- Height: 1.87 m (6 ft 2 in)
- Position: Goalkeeper

Senior career*
Years	Team	Apps	(Gls)
2002–2008	IFK Mariehamn	12	(0)
- * Club domestic league appearances and goals as of 23 November 2008

Anders Överström (born 25 November 1985) is a Finnish former goalkeeper and has been retired since 2008–2009. He has played most of his career at the Mariehamn based club IFK Mariehamn as a reserve, however, due to injuries in the 2008 season, he has also acted as the club's main goalkeeper. Additionally, he has represented further clubs IF Finströms Kamraterna, Hammarlands IK and FC Åland.
