= Amos Ekhalie =

Kenyan footballer (born 1988)

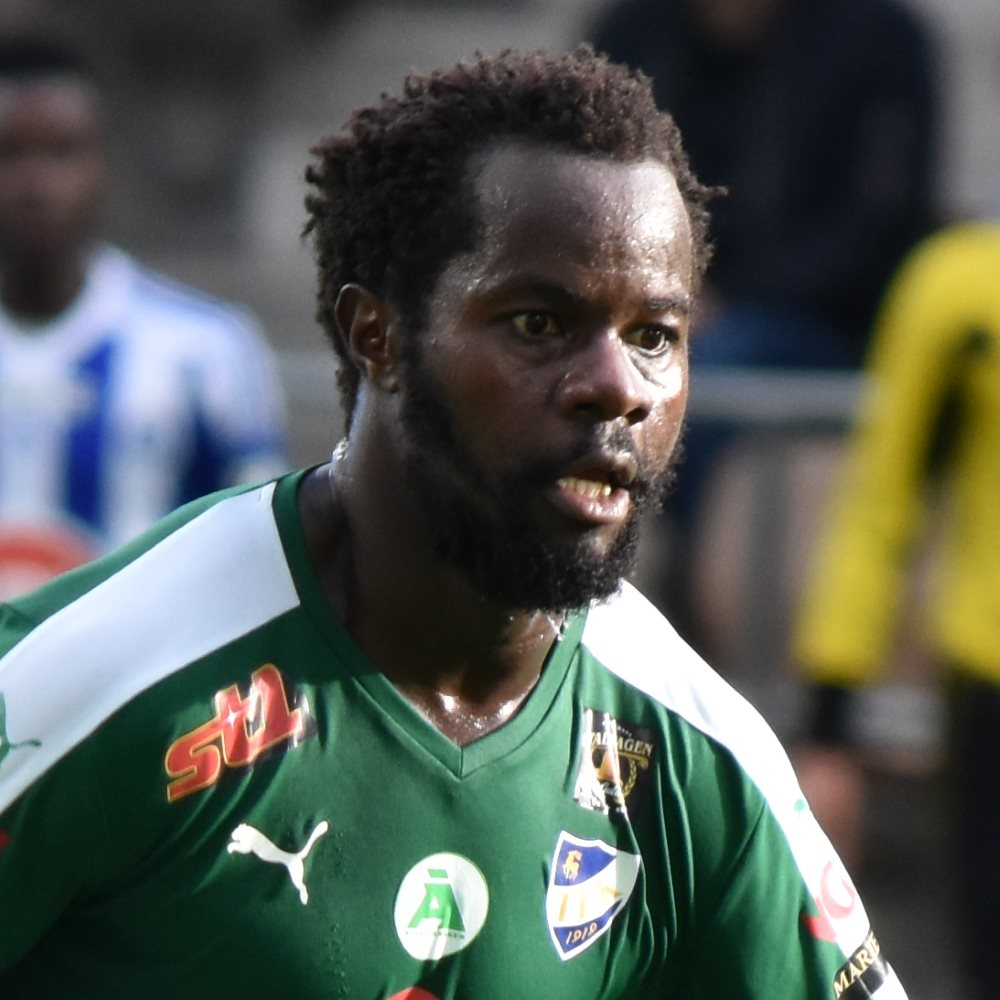

Personal information
- Full name: Amos Ekhalie Lundberg
- Date of birth: July 8, 1988 (age 38)
- Place of birth: Mombasa, Kenya
- Height: 1.76 m (5 ft 9 1/2 in)
- Position: Midfielder

Senior career*
Years	Team	Apps	(Gls)
2004–2007	Coast Stars		
2007–2012	IFK Mariehamn	80	(6)
2007–2008	→ IFFK (loan)	29	(0)
2013	Sunds IF	14	(0)
2013	Eskilstuna City	9	(0)
2014–2019	IFK Mariehamn	161	(12)
2023–	IFK Mora FK		

International career
2016	Kenya	10	(7)
- * Club domestic league appearances and goals

Amos Ekhalie (born 8 July 1988) is a Kenyan footballer who plays as a midfielder for IFK Mora FK in Sweden division 4. He also holds Finnish citizenship.

== Career ==
=== Club career ===
Ekhalie made his debut for Kenya in a friendly 1–0 win over. He scored the winning goal and Victor Wanyama got the assist Liberia on 15 November 2016.

== Honours ==
IFK Mariehamn

- Veikkausliiga: 2016
- Finnish Cup: 2015
