= Juha Reini =

Finnish footballer (born 1975)

Personal information
- Date of birth: 19 March 1975 (age 51)
- Place of birth: Kokkola, Finland
- Height: 1.88 m (6 ft 2 in)
- Position: Defender

Youth career
- GBK

Senior career*
Years	Team	Apps	(Gls)
1993–1995	KPV	27	(2)
1996–1998	VPS	54	(0)
1998–2002	Genk	66	(2)
2002–2006	AZ Alkmaar	32	(1)
2006	KPV	24	(5)

International career
1997–2004	Finland	23	(0)

Managerial career
- 2009: VPS
- 2013–2015: TPS (chief executive officer)
- 2015: TPS (sporting director)
- * Club domestic league appearances and goals

Juha Reini (born 19 March 1975) is a Finnish marketing director, sports executive and former professional footballer who played as a defender.

== Playing career ==
A versatile defender, Reini started his professional career in Finland with Veikkausliiga club VPS in 1996. In 1998, he moved to Genk in Belgium. There, he won two Belgian championships – in 1999 and 2002 – and also captained the side. In 2002, Reini moved to Dutch Eredivisie club AZ. He suffered multiple injuries during his stint with the club, which limited his appearances for both club and for the Finland national football team. After having played eight seasons of professional football abroad, Reini returned to his first club KPV in 2006, and retired after the Finnish Cup final against HJK Helsinki. For the Finland national team, he gained 23 caps.

== Managerial career ==
From 2006 to 2010, Reini worked as a scout for AZ, first in Scandinavia and later focusing only on Finland. He was then appointed sporting director of his former club, VPS in autumn 2008, but left the position after one season, where he temporarily managed the first team alongside Petri Vuorinen. In the autumn of 2009, Reini announced his resignation from the VPS on personal grounds.

== Later career ==
From 2010 to 2013, Reini worked as the agent of several Finland national team players together with Tapio Raatikainen. Their clients included Teemu Pukki, Joona Toivio, Kasper Hämäläinen and Jere Uronen. In the summer of 2013, he took up the position of chairman of TPS, holding office until January 2015. He then moved to the position of TPS's director of sports, from which he resigned in the summer of 2015, citing his desire to continue his career in coaching positions.

Apart from management, Reini has been an expert with Yle Sport since 2002. In addition, Reini has been a member of the Football Association of Finland's Top Football Committee in 2006–2012.

He has also worked as an operative director in brand partnership area. Since 2021, Reini has worked as a marketing director for a Finnish craft brewery RPS Brewing.

== Career statistics ==
As of 11 May 2024.

Appearances and goals by club, season and competition
Club	Season	League			National cup (Note: Includes Suomen Cup, Belgian Cup, Belgian League Cup and KNVB Beker)		Continental		Total	
Club	Season	Division	Apps	Goals	Apps	Goals	Apps	Goals	Apps	Goals
KPV	1993	Ykkönen								
KPV	1994	Ykkönen								
KPV	1995	Ykkönen								
KPV	Total		27	2	0	0	0	0	27	2
VPS	1996	Veikkausliiga	23	0	–		–		23	0
VPS	1997	Veikkausliiga	24	0	–		–		24	0
VPS	1998	Veikkausliiga	7	0	–		–		7	0
VPS	Total		54	0	0	0	0	0	54	0
Genk	1998–99	Belgian First Division	26	0	4	0	5 (Note: Includes UEFA Cup Winners' Cup)	1	35	1
Genk	1999–00	Belgian First Division	16	1	4	0	–		20	1
Genk	2000–01	Belgian First Division	12	0	3	0	2 (Note: Includes UEFA Cup)	0	17	0
Genk	2001–02	Belgian First Division	10	0	1	0	–		11	0
Genk	Total		64	1	12	0	7	1	83	2
AZ Alkmaar	2002–03	Eredivisie	13	0	–		–		13	0
AZ Alkmaar	2003–04	Eredivisie	18	1	–		–		18	1
AZ Alkmaar	2004–05	Eredivisie	0	0	–		–		0	0
AZ Alkmaar	2005–06	Eredivisie	1	0	–		–		1	0
AZ Alkmaar	Total		32	1	0	0	0	0	32	1
KPV	2006	Ykkönen	24	5	–		–		24	5
Career total			223	9	12	0	7	1	242	10
