= Johan Friberg da Cruz =

Swedish footballer

Johan Friberg
Personal information
- Full name: Johan Friberg Da Cruz
- Date of birth: 4 June 1986 (age 40)
- Place of birth: Gothenburg, Sweden
- Height: 1.90 m (6 ft 3 in)
- Position: Midfielder

Youth career
- –2003: BK Häcken
- 2004: GAIS

Senior career*
Years	Team	Apps	(Gls)
2005–2007	GAIS	17	(0)
2008	Västra Frölunda	0	(0)
2009	Blokhus	3	(0)
2010	Ljungskile	2	(0)
2010–2017	Assyriska BK	127	(31)
Total		149	(31)
- * Club domestic league appearances and goals

Johan Friberg Da Cruz (born 4 June 1986) is a Swedish former professional footballer who played as a midfielder.

== Career ==
Da Cruz was born in Gothenburg. He played professionally for GAIS in the Allsvenskan.

== Personal life ==
His older brother Bobbie is also a former footballer.
