= Philip Sparrdal Mantilla =

Swedish footballer

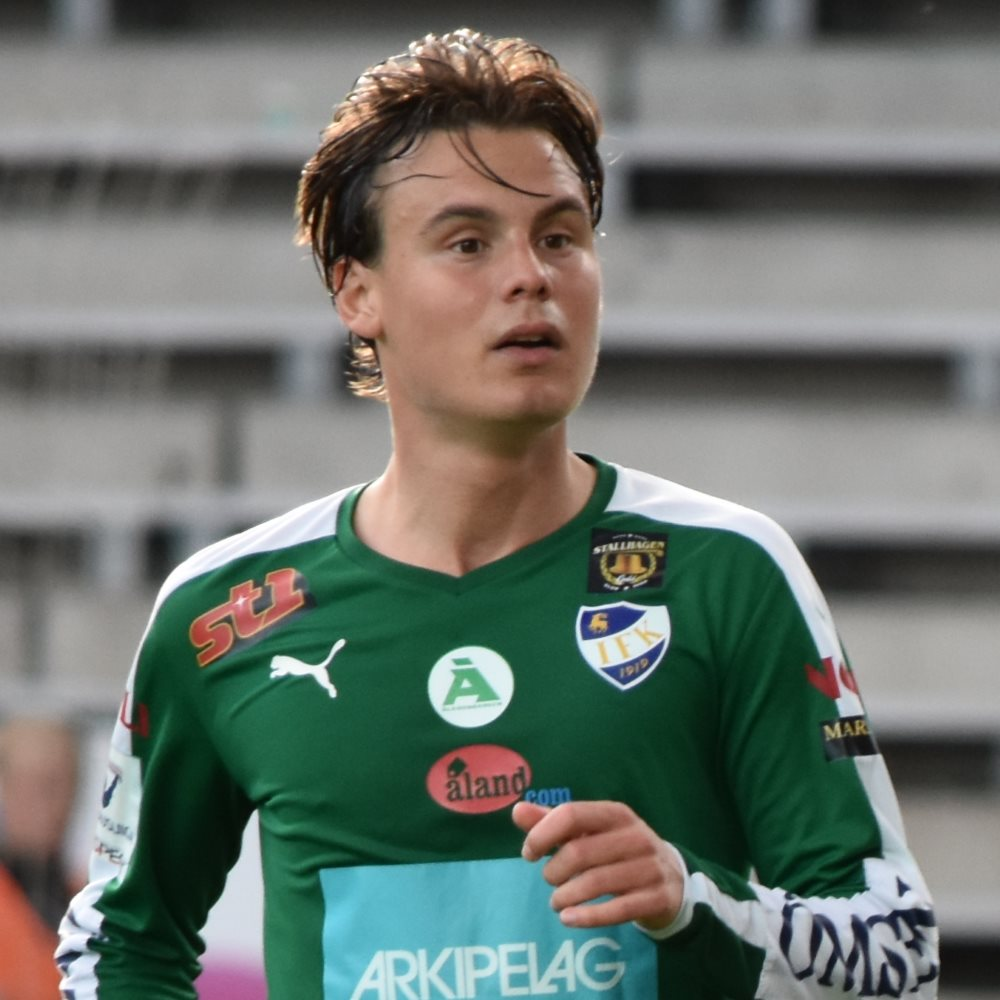
- Sparrdal Mantilla in 2017.

Personal information
- Full name: Philip Carl Edvard Sparrdal Mantilla
- Date of birth: 11 August 1993 (age 33)
- Place of birth: Stockholm, Sweden
- Height: 1.86 m (6 ft 1 in)
- Position: Defender

Youth career
- 1998–2002: Djurgårdens IF
- 2003–2006: Hammarby IF
- 2006–2008: IF Brommapojkarna
- 2008–2011: Djurgårdens IF

Senior career*
| Years | Team | Apps | (Gls) |
| 2011–2014 | Djurgårdens IF | 4 | (0) |
| 2015–2018 | IFK Mariehamn | 100 | (1) |

International career
| 2011 | Sweden U19 | 6 | (0) |
- * Club domestic league appearances and goals as of 20 January 2019

Philip Sparrdal Mantilla (born 11 August 1993) is a Swedish footballer who played for Djurgårdens IF and IFK Mariehamn as a defender.

== Career ==
During the 2011 pre-season, he was moved up from Djurgården's youth team. Sparrdal Mantilla made his Allsvenskan debut on 23 October 2011 against Gefle IF as a substitute. On July 14, 2013 Spardal Mantilla made his starting debut in Allsvenskan against Mjällby AIF.

Spardal left IFK Mariehamn at the end of the 2018 season.

== Career statistics ==
| Club performance | | | League | | Cup | | Continental | | Total | |
| Season | Club | League | Apps | Goals | Apps | Goals | Apps | Goals | Apps | Goals |
| Sweden | | | League | | Svenska Cupen | | Europe | | Total | |
|---|---|---|---|---|---|---|---|---|---|---|
| 2011 | Djurgårdens IF | Allsvenskan | 1 | 0 | 0 | 0 | — | | 1 | 0 |
| 2012 | Djurgårdens IF | Allsvenskan | 1 | 0 | 1 | 0 | — | | 2 | 0 |
| 2013 | Djurgårdens IF | Allsvenskan | 2 | 0 | 0 | 0 | — | | 2 | 0 |
| 2014 | Djurgårdens IF | Allsvenskan | 0 | 0 | 0 | 0 | — | | 0 | 0 |
| Total | Sweden | | 4 | 0 | 1 | 0 | 0 | 0 | 5 | 0 |

== Honours ==
- Veikkausliiga (1): 2016
- Finnish Cup (1): 2015

== Personal life ==
Mantilla's father is from Bucaramanga, Colombia.
