= Jussi Nuorela =

Finnish footballer (born 1974)

Personal information
- Full name: Jussi Johan Nuorela
- Date of birth: 11 August 1974 (age 52)
- Place of birth: Valkeakoski, Finland
- Height: 1.84 m (6 ft 0 in)
- Position: Defender

Team information
- Current team: VPS (manager)

Youth career
- –1991: Haka

Senior career*
Years	Team	Apps	(Gls)
1991–1996	Haka	93	(8)
1993–1995	PSV	0	(0)
1993–1995	EVV Eindhoven	7	(0)
1994–1995	Groningen	8	(0)
1993–1995	Twente	9	(1)
1996–1999	PEC Zwolle	23	(1)
1999–2000	Fortuna Düsseldorf	26	(0)
2000–2001	MYPA	45	(7)
2002–2003	Malmö	22	(0)
2002	→ Silkeborg (loan)	5	(0)
2003–2004	Elazığspor	12	(0)
2004–2005	Vaduz	26	(1)
2005–2007	TPS	44	(3)
2008–2009	Inter Turku	7	(0)

International career
1994–2003	Finland	20	(1)

Managerial career
- 2012: Espoo
- 2013: TPS (assistant)
- 2021: VPS (assistant)
- 2021–: VPS
- * Club domestic league appearances and goals

Jussi Nuorela (born 11 August 1974) is a Finnish professional football coach and a former player. He is the manager of VPS in the Veikkausliiga.

== Club career ==
Nuorela began his professional career with Haka in the Veikkausliiga. Besides his native Finland, Nuorela played in the Netherlands, Germany, Sweden, Denmark, Turkey, and Switzerland. He retired from professional playing career after the 2009 season and started as a youth coach at Inter Turku.

== International career ==
Nuorela has made 20 appearances for the Finland national football team, debuting coming in a friendly match against Qatar on 25 January 1994. He scored one goal, in a friendly match against Oman on 18 February 2001.

== Coaching career ==
Nuorela started coaching as a U19 coach for Inter Turku, additionally coaching the club's reserve team Sinimustat. In 2011–12 he served as the head coach of FC Espoo, and in 2013 as an assistant coach of TPS. During 2014–2020, he worked as a youth coach of TPS and Inter Turku.

On 18 June 2021, Nuorela was promoted to the position of the head coach of Vaasan Palloseura (VPS) in the Finnish second-tier Ykkönen. He led the club to the promotion to the top-level Veikkausliiga at the end of the 2021 season.

In the 2023 Veikkausliiga season, Nuorela led VPS to the record-tying streak of 12 victories, and managed the club to finish 3rd in the league and thus qualifying for the 2024–25 UEFA Conference League qualifiers. He was named the Veikkausliiga Manager of the Month in three consecutive times in July, August and September 2023, and ultimately he was named the Finnish Football Manager of the Year and Veikkausliiga Manager of the Year.

== Personal life ==
His son Josep Nuorela is a footballer playing for VPS, and his younger son Luka plays for VPS U19 youth team.

== Career statistics ==
=== Club ===
As of 31 December 2020

Appearances and goals by club, season and competition
Club	Season	League			Cup (Note: Includes Suomen Cup, KNVB Beker, DFB-Pokal and Liechtenstein Football Cup)		Continental		Other		Total	
Club	Season	Division	Apps	Goals	Apps	Goals	Apps	Goals	Apps	Goals	Apps	Goals
Haka	1991	Veikkausliiga	2	0	0	0	—		—		2	0
Haka	1992	Veikkausliiga	32	3	0	0	—		—		32	3
Haka	1993	Veikkausliiga	10	2	0	0	—		—		10	2
Haka	1994	Veikkausliiga	17	0	0	0	—		—		17	0
Haka	Total		61	5			—		—		61	5
EVV Eindhoven (loan)	1993–94	Eerste Divisie	7	0	—		—		—		7	0
Groningen	1994–95	Eredivisie	8	0	0	0	—		—		8	0
Haka	1995	Veikkausliiga	7	0	0	0	—		—		7	0
Haka	1996	Veikkausliiga	25	3	0	0	3 (Note: Includes UEFA Cup)	0	—		25	3
Haka	Total		32	3	0	0	3	0	0	0	35	3
Twente	1996–97	Eerste Divisie	9	1			—		—		9	1
PEC Zwolle	1997–98	Eredivisie	23	1			—		—		23	1
PEC Zwolle	1998–99	Eerste Divisie	11	0	1	0	—		5	0	17	0
PEC Zwolle	Total		34	1	1	0	0	0	5	0	40	2
Fortuna Düsseldorf	1999–2000	Regionalliga West-Südwest	26	0	2	0	—		—		28	0
MyPa	2000	Veikkausliiga	14	3	0	0	—		—		14	3
MyPa	2001	Veikkausliiga	31	4	0	0	2	0	—		33	4
MyPa	Total		45	7	0	0	2	0	0	0	47	7
Malmö FF	2002	Allsvenskan	15	0			—		—		15	0
Malmö FF	2003	Allsvenskan	7	0			1	0	—		8	0
Malmö FF	Total		22	0	0	0	1	0	0	0	23	0
Silkeborg (loan)	2002–03	Danish Superliga	5	0	—		—		—		5	0
Elazığspor	2003–04	Süper Lig	11	0	—		—		—		11	0
FC Vaduz	2004–05	Swiss Challenge League	26	1	4	2	—		1	0	31	3
TPS	2005	Veikkausliiga	6	0	1	0	—		—		7	0
TPS	2006	Veikkausliiga	24	2	0	0	—		—		24	2
TPS	2007	Veikkausliiga	14	1	0	0	—		—		14	1
TPS	Total		44	3	0	0	0	0	0	0	44	3
Inter Turku	2008	Veikkausliiga	7	0	0	0	—		—		7	0
Inter Turku	2009	Veikkausliiga	0	0	0	0	—		1	0	1	0
Inter Turku	Total		7	0	0	0	0	0	1	0	8	0
PoPa	2009	Ykkönen	1	0	0	0	—		—		1	0
Career total			344	20	8	2	6	0	7	0	365	22

=== International ===
Appearances and goals by national team and year
National team	Year	Apps	Goals
Finland	1994	3	0
Finland	1995	2	0
Finland	1996	0	0
Finland	1997	5	0
Finland	1998	0	0
Finland	1999	0	0
Finland	2000	0	0
Finland	2001	5	1
Finland	2002	3	0
Finland	2003	2	0
Total		84	42

Scores and results list Finland's goal tally first, score column indicates score after each Nuorela goal.

List of international goals scored by Jussi Nuorela
No.	Date	Venue	Opponent	Score	Result	Competition
1	18 February 2001	Sultan Qaboos Sports Complex, Muscat, Oman	Oman	1–0	2–1	Friendly

=== Managerial ===
As of 12 May 2025

Team	Nat	From	To	Record				
Team	Nat	From	To	P	W	D	L	W%
VPS	(Finland)	18 June 2021	present	146	72	22	52	49.32
Total				146	72	22	52	49.32

== Managerial achievements ==
VPS

- Veikkausliiga: 2023 3rd place
- Ykkönen: 2021

=== Individual ===
- Finnish Football Manager of the Year: 2023
- Veikkausliiga Team of the Year: 2023
- Veikkausliiga Manager of the Year: 2023
- Veikkausliiga Manager of the Month: July 2023, August 2023, October 2023
