= Anthony Dafaa =

Kenyan footballer (born 1988)

Personal information
- Full name: Anthony Clement Dafaa
- Date of birth: 26 June 1988 (age 38)
- Place of birth: Mombasa, Kenya
- Height: 1.80 m (5 ft 11 in)
- Position: Midfielder

Senior career*
Years	Team	Apps	(Gls)
2008–2011	Bandari		
2011–2012	Karlskrona AIF	25	(1)
2012	Assyriska IF		
2012–2013	Azech SF		
2013–2014	VPS	56	(1)
2015–2017	IFK Mariehamn	50	(2)
2018	FC Haka	0	(0)
2018–2019	FF Jaro	30	(0)

International career
2007–2009	Kenya	6	(0)
- * Club domestic league appearances and goals

Anthony Dafaa (born 26 June 1988) is a Kenyan footballer who played several seasons in the Veikkausliiga.

Clement has previously played for Bandari in the Kenyan Premier League and for two clubs in Swedish lower divisions. He was capped once for Kenya national team in 2009.

== Career statistics ==
=== Club ===
As of match played 14 August 2016

Appearances and goals by club, season and competition
Club	Season	League			National Cup		League Cup		Continental		Total	
Club	Season	Division	Apps	Goals	Apps	Goals	Apps	Goals	Apps	Goals	Apps	Goals
VPS	2014	Veikkausliiga	29	1	2	0	1	0	-		32	1
VPS	2015	Veikkausliiga	28	0	0	0	5	0	-		33	0
VPS	Total		57	1	2	0	6	0	-	-	65	1
IFK Mariehamn	2015	Veikkausliiga	26	0	3	0	4	0	-		33	0
IFK Mariehamn	2016	Veikkausliiga	12	1	1	0	4	0	1	0	18	1
IFK Mariehamn	Total		38	1	4	0	8	0	1	0	51	1
Career total			95	2	6	0	14	0	1	0	116	1

=== International ===
Kenya national team
Year	Apps	Goals
2007	5	0
2009	1	0
Total	6	0

Statistics accurate as of match played 14 March 2009
