= Petri Vuorinen =

Finnish football manager (born 1972)

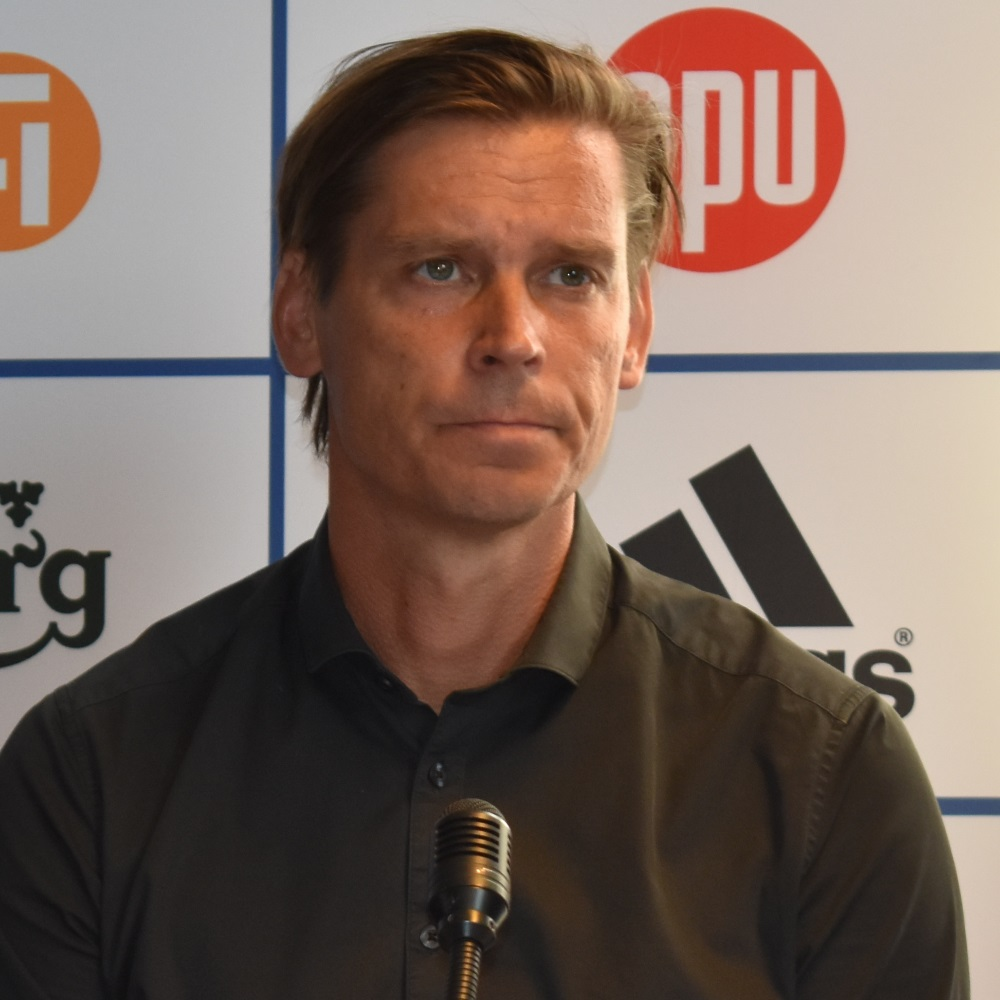
- Vuorinen with VPS in 2018.

Personal information
- Date of birth: 31 August 1972 (age 54)
- Place of birth: Sweden
- Position: Defensive midfielder

Team information
- Current team: HJK (sporting director)

Senior career*
Years	Team	Apps	(Gls)
1989	Wasa-88	22	(3)
1991–1999	BK-IFK	128	(4)
2000	Närpes Kraft	22	(0)
2001	Jaro	17	(1)

Managerial career
- 2004–2007: VIFK (assistant)
- 2008–2009: VPS (assistant)
- 2009: VPS
- 2010–2011: VPS (assistant)
- 2011: VPS
- 2012–2015: VPS (assistant)
- 2015–2019: VPS
- 2020: Honka II (assistant)
- 2021–2023: Honka (sporting director)
- 2024: VPS (sporting director)
- 2024–: HJK (sporting director)
- * Club domestic league appearances and goals

Petri Vuorinen (born 31 August 1972) is a Finnish football manager and a former player. He is currently working as the sporting director of Veikkausliiga club HJK Helsinki.

== Early and personal life ==
Vuorinen was born in Sweden to Finnish parents, who had emigrated to Trollhättan for work. Vuorinen's father suffered from alcoholism. His parents divorced when he was 12 years old, and Vuorinen first moved to Sundsvall with his mother and siblings. A year-and-a-half later they moved back to Vaasa, Finland.

Vuorinen has worked in a school, in a hospital and as a fire officer in Vaasa and Helsinki.

== Playing career ==
As a player, Vuorinen played as a defensive midfielder in second-tier Ykkönen for BK-IFK, Närpes Kraft and Jaro. With Jaro, they won the promotion to Veikkausliiga, but Vuorinen did not make any appearances in the league due to knee injury. He also played for Wasa-88, Korsholm and Vasa IFK in the lower divisions in the Finnish football league system.

== Coaching career ==
Vuorinen started his senior coaching career as an assistant of his hometown club Vasa IFK in 2004. After three years, he first joined Vaasan Palloseura (VPS) as an assistant coach. He worked as assistant to Tomi Kärkkäinen, Tommi Pikkarainen and Olli Huttunen. Vuorinen worked also as a caretaker manager of VPS twice, in 2009 accompanied by sporting director Juha Reini, and in 2011 solely. During 2015–2019, Vuorinen served as the VPS first team head coach in Veikkausliiga.

In 2020, Vuorinen joined fellow Veikkausliiga club FC Honka, first as a coach. In 2021, he was named the club's sporting director.

For the 2024 season, Vuorinen returned to Vaasa and was appointed a sporting director of his former club VPS.

On 22 October 2024, he was named the new sporting director of HJK Helsinki, starting in the beginning of November.

== Managerial statistics ==
As of 9 July 2023

Team	Nat	From	To	Record				
Team	Nat	From	To	G	W	D	L	Win %
VPS	(Finland)	15 May 2009	31 December 2009	21	10	4	7	47.62
VPS	(Finland)	28 July 2011	31 December 2011	17	6	6	5	35.29
VPS	(Finland)	29 June 2015	7 July 2019	163	56	48	59	34.36
Total				201	72	58	71	35.82

== Honours ==
Individual

- Veikkausliiga Manager of the Month: July 2016
