= FC Sinimustat =

Former Finnish football club (2007-2010)

- Full name: FC Sinimustat
- Nickname(s): Sinimustat
- Founded: 2007; 18 years ago
- Dissolved: 2010; 15 years ago
- Ground: Yläkenttä, Kupittaa, Turku; Finland
- Capacity: 1,500
- Chairman: Stefan Håkans
- Head Coach: Jussi Nuorela
- Coach: Jouni Jalonen; Petteri Joensuu
- League: Kakkonen
- 2009: 11th – Kakkonen (Group B)
Home colours

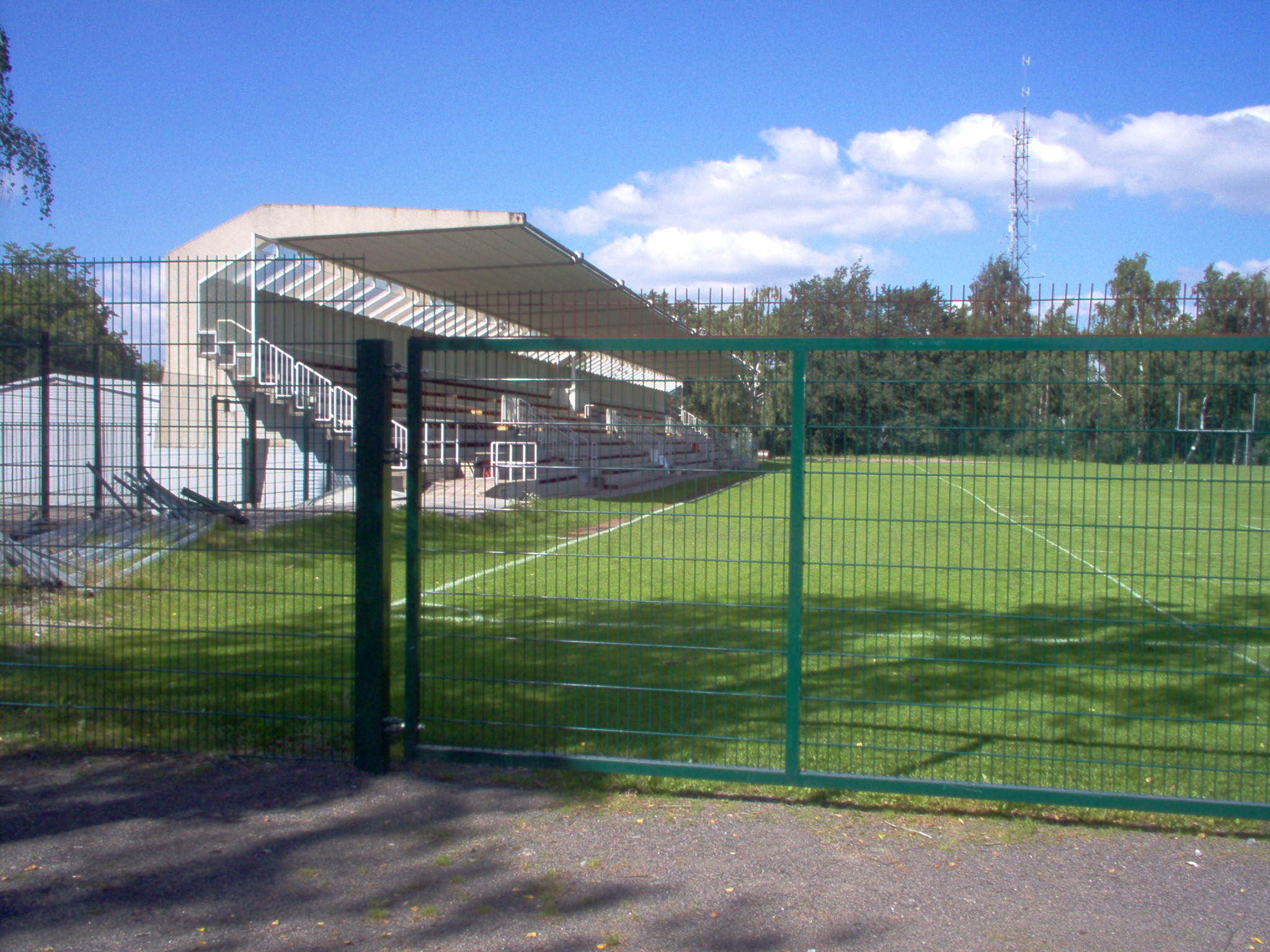
Turun Ylakentta

FC Sinimustat (transl. FC Blue-and-Blacks, abr. Sinimustat) is a former football club from Turku in Finland. The club was formed in September 2007 and dissolved in 2010. Their home ground was at the Yläkenttä, Kupittaa, and Sinimustat was FC Inter Turku's 'B team' which played in the Kakkonen, or the fourth level of football in Finland. The Chairman of Inter Turku was Stefan Håkans.

== History ==
FC Sinimusta was established in September 2007 as a reserve and development team for the Veikkausliiga club, FC Inter Turku. Sinimusta were fortunate to begin their competitive football life in 2008 in Group B of the Kakkonen (Second Division) by taking the place of VG-62 Naantali who previously operated as FC Inter's second string. Founder members of the team included footballers Magnus Bahne and Ari Nyman as well as FC Inter's chairman Stefan Håkans.

Sinimusta were now in their third season in the Kakkonen (Second Division), the fourth tier of Finnish football. Both the 2008 and 2009 seasons had the team finish in eleventh position just above the relegation places.

== Coaches ==
- 2008 Jami Wallenius
- 2009 Hannu Paatelo
- 2010 Jussi Nuorela

== Season to season ==
Season	Level	Division	Section	Administration	Position	Movements
2008	Tier 3	Kakkonen (Second Division)	Group B	Finnish FA (Suomen Pallolitto)	11th	
2009	Tier 3	Kakkonen (Second Division)	Group B	Finnish FA (Suomen Pallolitto)	11th	
2010	Tier 3	Kakkonen (Second Division)	Group B	Finnish FA (Suomen Pallolitto)		

- 3 seasons in Kakkonen

== Club Structure ==
Sinimustat was part of the FC Inter Turku structure. In addition, the Inter Akatemia which provided gifted juniors with the optimum conditions for training before moving to a League team or overseas.

== References and sources ==
- Suomen Cup
