= Bobbie Friberg da Cruz =

Swedish footballer

Bobbie Friberg Da Cruz
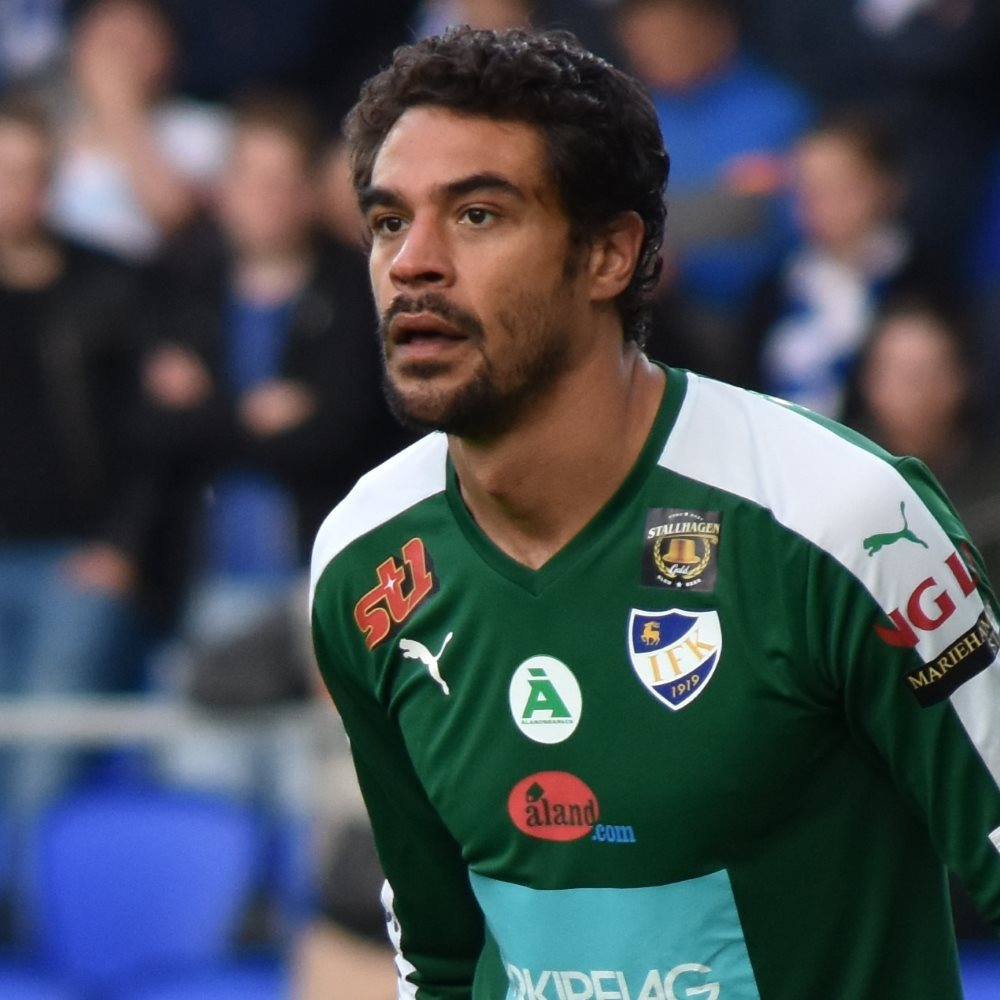
- Da Cruz in 2017

Personal information
- Full name: Bobbie Friberg José Da Cruz
- Date of birth: 16 February 1982 (age 44)
- Place of birth: Gothenburg, Sweden
- Height: 1.90 m (6 ft 3 in)
- Position: Defender

Youth career
- –2000: IF Stendy
- 2001–200?: GAIS

Senior career*
Years	Team	Apps	(Gls)
2001–2008	GAIS	149	(11)
2009–2010	Randers	24	(0)
2010	→ Kongsvinger (loan)	29	(0)
2011–2013	IFK Norrköping	55	(4)
2014–2017	IFK Mariehamn	119	(1)
2020	FC Nacka	9	(2)
2021	FC Södrasidan	6	(0)
Total		391	(18)
Medal record
IFK Mariehamn
Winner	Veikkausliiga	2016
- * Club domestic league appearances and goals

Bobbie Friberg da Cruz (born 16 February 1982) is a Swedish former professional footballer who played as a defender.

He has played for IFK Mariehamn in Finland, IFK Norrköping and GAIS in Sweden, Randers in Denmark, and Kongsvinger in Norway. His brother Johan Friberg da Cruz is also a professional football player. Their father is of Cape Verdean origin, and both of the brothers have been invited to the Cape Verde national team.

== Club career ==
Da Cruz had played for GAIS since he was 16 years old. After being a part of the first team for seven years da Cruz signed a four-year contract with Danish Superliga side Randers FC; he was presented on 22 June 2008 and debuted on 1 March in the derby against AGF. Da Cruz played the full 90 minutes. Randers won the game 2–1. He would go on to make another 11 appearances in the 2008–09 season.

On 29 January 2010, an agreement was reached between Randers and Norwegian club Kongsvinger for da Cruz to go on a one-year loan spell. Both Randers and da Cruz himself felt that he had not lived up to expectations during his first year in Denmark, and that a move to Norwegian football might prove beneficial. Kongsvinger where newcomers to the Norwegian top flight Tippeligaen in 2010, having gained promotion in 2009. On 1 February 2011, da Cruz announced he would move to IFK Norrköping playing in Allsvenskan. He signed a three-year contract with the Swedish top flight club. In 2014, Friberg da Cruz left IFK Norrköping for IFK Mariehamn in the Veikkausliiga. He retired at the end of 2017.

On 8 April 2020, 38-year old Da Cruz came out of retirement to join Swedish Division 4 club FC Nacka Iliria. They won promotion the same year and Friberg played a crucial part of the short COVID-19 season. He was named Man of the Match in the decisive playoff game against Hargs BK. In the 2021, he played for FC Södrasidan.

== Honors ==
IFK Mariehamn

- Veikkausliiga: 2016
