= Jani Lyyski =

Finnish footballer (born 1983)

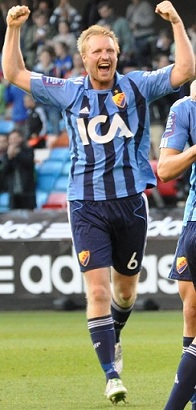
- Jani Lyyski in 2011

Personal information
- Full name: Jani Pekka Lyyski
- Date of birth: 16 March 1983 (age 43)
- Place of birth: Mariehamn, Finland
- Height: 1.93 m (6 ft 4 in)
- Position: Centre back

Youth career
- 1987–1999: IFK Mariehamn
- 1999–2001: IF Brommapojkarna

Senior career*
Years	Team	Apps	(Gls)
1998–1999	IFK Mariehamn	13	(1)
2000–2001	IF Brommapojkarna	0	(0)
2000	→ Spånga IS (loan)	15	(1)
2002–2008	IFK Mariehamn	146	(19)
2006	→ IFFK (loan)	1	(1)
2009	VPS	26	(3)
2010–2011	Djurgården	41	(0)
2012–2017	IFK Mariehamn	161	(16)

International career
1999	Åland		
2010	Finland	3	(0)
- * Club domestic league appearances and goals

Jani Pekka Lyyski (born 16 March 1983) is a Finnish former professional footballer who represented IFK Mariehamn, VPS, Djurgården, and the Finland national team, leading IFK Mariehamn to the 2016 Veikkausliiga win as their captain.

== Club career ==
=== Early years and IFK Mariehamn ===
Born on Åland, Lyyski started his football career in IFK Mariehamn. During 2000 and 2001, he resided in Stockholm and played with Spånga IS and youth football with Brommapojkarna. He returned to Åland in 2002 and managed to get into the senior team of IFK Mariehamn, and played there for seven years. He helped IFK Mariehamn to win promotions from third-tier Kakkonen to Ykkönen and eventually to top-tier Veikkausliiga in 2005, and was an integral part in establishing the club at the highest level. In the 2006 season, he played one match for the associate club IF Finströms Kamraterna in the fourth-tier Kolmonen and scored a goal.

After the 2008 season, he moved to Vaasa and the club Vaasan Palloseura in November 2008.

=== Djurgården ===
On 26 November 2009, he signed on for Swedish side Djurgårdens IF. Upon arrival, he was one of four Finnish players in the squad, together with Kasper Hämäläinen, Joona Toivio, and Joel Perovuo. Lyyski made his Allsvenskan debut for Djurgården on 14 March 2010 against BK Häcken. Lyyski and Toivio started the season as the central defender dup, but Prince Ikpe Ekong was soon chosen over Lyyski.

Lyyski left the club after the 2011 season.

=== Return to IFK Mariehamn ===
In March 2012, Lyyski returned to IFK Mariehamn. Lyyski became captain of the team and led them to win the 2015 Finnish Cup and the 2016 Veikkausliiga title. In 2017, after a total of 15 seasons with IFK Mariehamn, he played his last match for the club as no contract renewal was offered.

== International career ==
Lyyski received a call-up to the Åland official football team in 1999 but didn't make any appearance for them.

On 18 January 2010, Lyyski made his first appearance for the Finland national team, in friendly match against South Korea in Málaga, Spain. He was in the starting line-up and played the whole match.

== Personal life ==
His father Pekka Lyyski is a former manager of IFK Mariehamn.

Lyyski has worked as a football commentator for Swedish-speaking YLE.

== Career statistics ==
=== Club ===
As of 1 September 2024.

Appearances and goals by club, season and competition
Club	Season	League			Cup (Note: Includes Suomen Cup and Svenska Cupen)		League cup (Note: Includes Finnish League Cup)		Europe		Total	
Club	Season	Division	Apps	Goals	Apps	Goals	Apps	Goals	Apps	Goals	Apps	Goals
IFK Mariehamn	1998	Kakkonen	7	0	–		–		–		7	0
IFK Mariehamn	1999	Kakkonen	6	1	–		–		–		6	1
IFK Mariehamn	Total		13	1	0	0	0	0	0	0	13	1
Spånga IS	2000	Swedish Division 2	15	1	–		–		–		15	1
Brommapojkarna	2001	Swedish Division 2	0	0	–		–		–		0	0
IFK Mariehamn	2002	Kakkonen	21	1	–		–		–		21	1
IFK Mariehamn	2003	Kakkonen	16	2	–		–		–		16	2
IFK Mariehamn	2004	Ykkönen	26	10	–		–		–		26	10
IFK Mariehamn	2005	Veikkausliiga	13	1	–		–		–		13	1
IFK Mariehamn	2006	Veikkausliiga	16	1	–		–		–		16	1
IFK Mariehamn	2007	Veikkausliiga	26	2	–		–		–		26	2
IFK Mariehamn	2008	Veikkausliiga	26	2	–		–		–		26	2
IFK Mariehamn	Total		144	19	0	0	0	0	0	0	144	19
IF Finströms Kamraterna (loan)	2006	Kolmonen	1	1	–		–		–		1	1
VPS	2009	Veikkausliiga	26	3	0	0	7	1	–		33	4
Djurgården	2010	Allsvenskan	20	0	0	0	–		–		20	0
Djurgården	2011	Allsvenskan	21	0	0	0	–		–		21	0
Djurgården	Total		41	0	0	0	0	0	0	0	41	0
IFK Mariehamn	2012	Veikkausliiga	27	1	4	0	2	1	–		33	2
IFK Mariehamn	2013	Veikkausliiga	30	3	2	0	2	0	2 (Note: Appearances in UEFA Europa League)	0	36	3
IFK Mariehamn	2014	Veikkausliiga	25	3	2	0	6	0	–		33	3
IFK Mariehamn	2015	Veikkausliiga	30	3	6	2	4	0	–		40	5
IFK Mariehamn	2016	Veikkausliiga	31	5	2	0	4	0	2	0	39	5
IFK Mariehamn	2017	Veikkausliiga	18	1	5	1	–		2 (Note: Appearances in UEFA Champions League)	0	25	2
IFK Mariehamn	Total		161	16	21	3	16	1	6	0	204	20
Career total			401	46	21	3	23	2	6	0	451	51

=== International ===
As of match played 11 August 2010

Finland
Year	Apps	Goals
2010	3	0
Total	3	0

== Honours ==
IFK Mariehamn

- Veikkausliiga: 2016
- Finnish Cup: 2015

Individual

- Veikkausliiga Team of the Year: 2016
- Veikkausliiga Defender of the Year: 2016
- Veikkausliiga Player of the Month: October 2017
