= Brian Span =

American soccer player (born 1992)

Brian "Cobi" Span
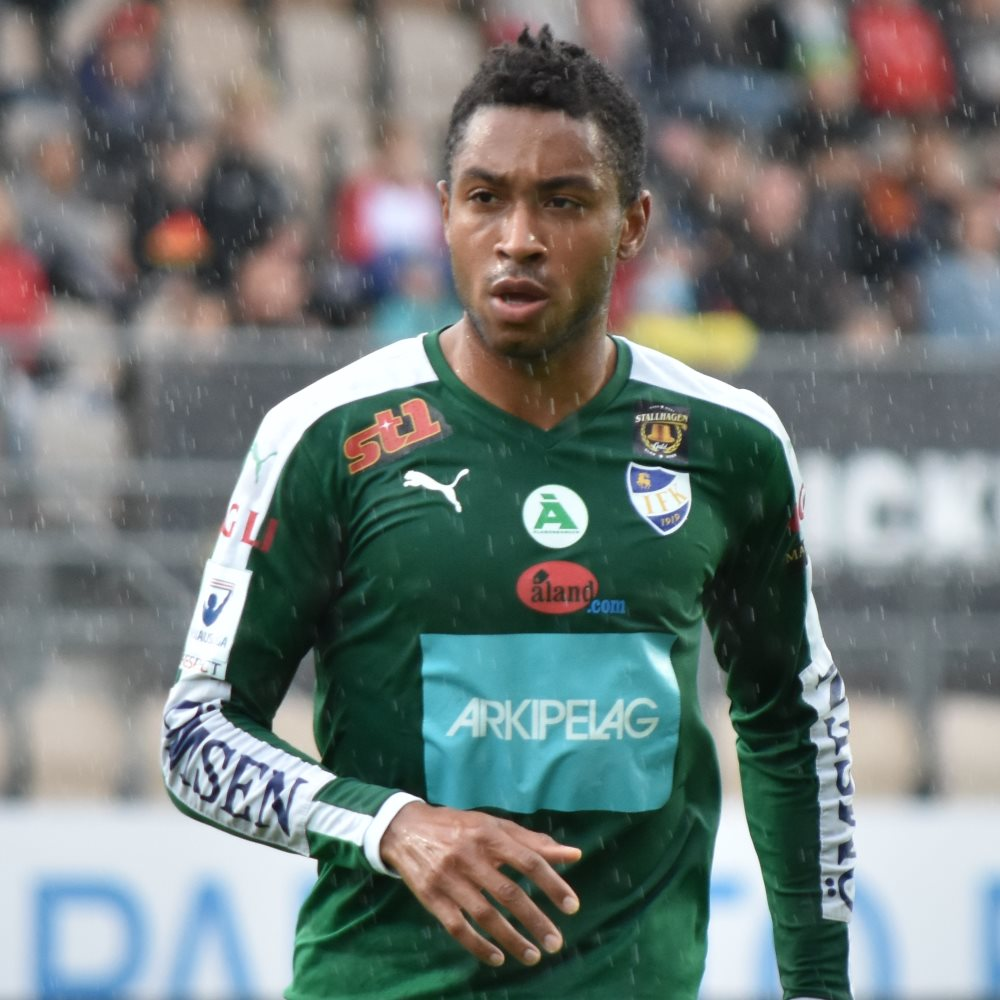
- Span with IFK Mariehamn

Personal information
- Full name: Brian Matthew Span Jackson
- Date of birth: February 23, 1992 (age 34)
- Place of birth: Somers, New York, United States
- Height: 1.88 m (6 ft 2 in)
- Position: Midfielder

Youth career
- 2003–2010: FC Westchester

College career
Years	Team	Apps	(Gls)
2010–2011	Virginia Cavaliers	41	(12)

Senior career*
Years	Team	Apps	(Gls)
2011	Reading United	5	(1)
2012–2013	Djurgårdens IF	14	(1)
2014	FC Dallas	0	(0)
2014	→ Orlando City (loan)	19	(3)
2015–2017	IFK Mariehamn	96	(10)
2018–2021	Västerås SK	96	(10)
2022–2023	Haninge	25	(8)
- * Club domestic league appearances and goals as of January 1, 2023

Brian "Cobi" Span (born February 23, 1992) is a retired American professional soccer player who last played for Swedish club Haninge.

== Club career ==
Span started out playing for FC Westchester as a youth player at age twelve. He stayed there for seven years and then went on to play two years of college soccer at the University of Virginia, scoring 12 goals and registering 8 assists during that time.

During the summer of 2011 he trained in Europe with German club TSG 1899 Hoffenheim and Örebro SK in Sweden. After his sophomore season that autumn, the winger felt ready to go professional but MLS did not offer him a Generation Adidas contract. Instead, the North Salem native signed a two-year deal with Djurgårdens IF in Swedish Allsvenskan.

=== Djurgårdens IF ===
Span made his debut on May 20, 2012. He came on at the 65th minute, replacing Ricardo Santos, and played the rest of the match. Three days later he scored his first professional goal in his first game as a starter to equalize 1–1 against Helsingborgs IF. Span's contract was not renewed following the 2013 season.

=== FC Dallas ===
On January 8, 2014, Span signed a contract with Major League Soccer and was allocated via a weighted lottery with FC Dallas, Chicago Fire, San Jose Earthquakes, New England Revolution and Real Salt Lake participating. FC Dallas acquired Span on January 9 in the weighted lottery.

Span was waived by Dallas on February 5, 2015.

=== Orlando City ===
Span was loaned to USL Pro club Orlando City on April 2, 2014.

== International career ==
While not a recent national team participant, Span was a member of the U17 residency program in Bradenton, Florida.

In 2020, Span expressed his intention to play for the Costa Rica national team, motivated by his maternal family, who are relatives to Costa Rican legend Juan Cayasso.

== Honors ==
IFK Mariehamn

- Veikkausliiga: 2016
- Finnish Cup: 2015

Västerås SK

- Division 1 Norra: 2018
