= Kari Virtanen =

Finnish footballer and manager (born 1958)

Personal information
- Full name: Kari Virtanen
- Date of birth: September 15, 1958 (age 68)
- Place of birth: Piikkiö, Finland
- Height: 1.82 m (6 ft 0 in)
- Position: Midfielder

Team information
- Current team: FC Inter Turku

Senior career*
Years	Team	Apps	(Gls)
1976	Piikkiön Palloseura		
1977–1979	TPS	62	(10)
1980–1981	IFK Eskilstuna	45	(1)
1982	TPS	21	(6)
1983–1985	AIK	45	(4)
1986–1987	RoPS	41	(3)
1988–1989	KePS	43	(2)
1990	Kuusankosken Kumu	6	(0)
1991–1992	Piikkiön Palloseura		

International career
1978–1979	Finland U21	7	(0)
1979–1986	Finland	37	(1)

Managerial career
- 1993–1994: Piikkiön Palloseura
- 1996: Kanuunat Rovaniemi
- 1997–1999: RoPS
- 2000–2002: VG-62
- 2003–2006: FC Inter Turku
- 2007: RoPS
- 2011: PIF
- 2012–2013: RoPS
- 2016–2017: IFK Mariehamn
- * Club domestic league appearances and goals

Kari Virtanen (born 15 September 1958) is a Finnish football manager and former player. He is currently coach of Veikkausliiga club Inter Turku.

== Club career ==
As a player Virtanen spent his career in Finland and Sweden, representing Piikkiön Palloseura, TPS, IFK Eskilstuna, AIK, Rovaniemen Palloseura, Kemin Palloseura and Kuusankosken Kumu.

== International career ==
Virtanen represented Team Finland in the 1980 Summer Olympic Games in Moscow, Soviet Union. Finland finished 3rd in Group D with one win, one draw and one loss. Virtanen was in starting eleven in all three matches.

== Managerial career ==
As a manager Virtanen has been working with teams in different tiers of Finnish football league system. His first manager position in Veikkausliiga was in 2003 with Inter Turku. He has been a manager of Rovaniemen Palloseura on two occasions. In 2012 he won Ykkönen with RoPS and promoted to Veikkausliiga. In the following season RoPS also won Finnish Cup for the second time in their history.

In 2016 he was named as a co-manager of IFK Mariehamn with Peter Lundberg. IFK Mariehamn won Veikkausliiga for the first time in history that season. Virtanen remained in the club as an advisor for one more season.

== Honours and achievements ==
=== Player ===
AIK Fotboll

- Svenska Cupen: 1985

Rovaniemen Palloseura

- Finnish Cup: 1986

=== Manager ===
Rovaniemen Palloseura

- Ykkönen: 2012
- Finnish Cup: 2013

IFK Mariehamn

- Veikkausliiga: 2016

Individual

- Veikkausliiga Manager of the Month: April 2016, October 2016 (with Peter Lundberg)
- Veikkausliiga Manager of the Year: 2016 (with Peter Lundberg)
- Finnish Football Manager of the Year: 2016[ (with Peter Lundberg)
