= Josep Nuorela =

Finnish footballer (born 2003)

Personal information
- Date of birth: 19 June 2003 (age 23)
- Place of birth: Finland
- Height: 1.84 m (6 ft 0 in)
- Position: Defender

Team information
- Current team: FC Jazz
- Number: 3

Youth career
- TuNL
- KaaPo
- –2020: Inter Turku

Senior career*
Years	Team	Apps	(Gls)
2021–2025	VPS II	61	(10)
2021–	VPS	21	(0)
2025	→ KPV (loan)	13	(0)
2026–	FC Jazz	23	(0)
- * Club domestic league appearances and goals as of 7 November 2026

Josep Nuorela (born 19 June 2003) is a Finnish professional football player, playing as a defender for Ykkönen side FC Jazz.

== Personal life ==
He is the son of Jussi Nuorela, the current manager of VPS and a former Finnish international footballer.
