= Thomas Mäkinen =

Finnish footballer (born 1997)

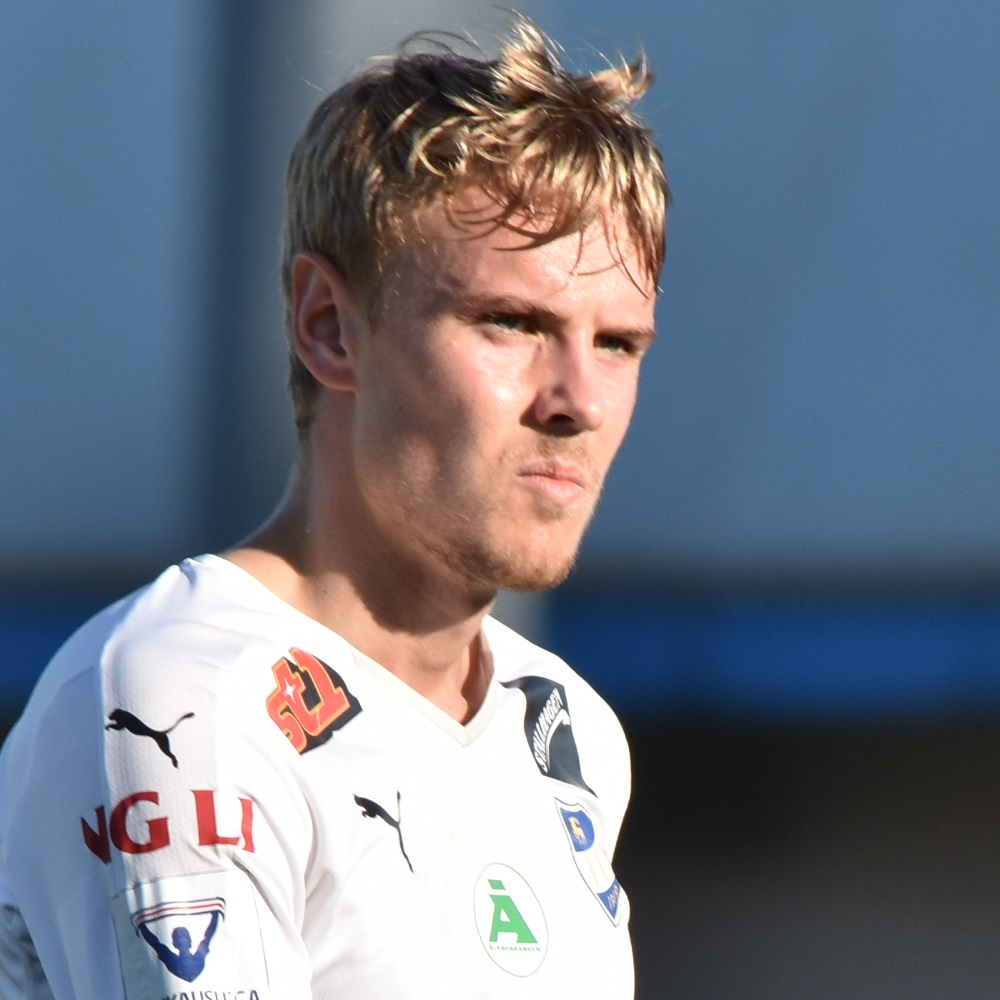

Personal information
- Full name: Thomas Mäkinen
- Date of birth: 30 January 1997 (age 29)
- Place of birth: Mariehamn, Finland
- Height: 1.86 m (6 ft 1 in)
- Position: Midfielder

Team information
- Current team: FC Åland

Youth career
- IFK Mariehamn

Senior career*
Years	Team	Apps	(Gls)
2014–2017	IFK Mariehamn	39	(1)
2016	→ FC Åland (loan)	4	(0)
2017	Renate	2	(0)
2018	IFK Mariehamn	29	(3)
2019–	FC Åland	25	(2)

International career^{‡}
2015	Finland U19	3	(0)
2016	Finland U20	1	(0)
2017–	Finland U21	1	(0)
Medal record
IFK Mariehamn
First place	Finnish Cup	2015
First place	Veikkausliiga	2016
- * Club domestic league appearances and goals as of 2 October 2019 ‡ National team caps and goals as of 24 March 2017

Thomas Mäkinen (born 30 January 1997) is a Finnish professional football midfielder who plays for Finnish club FC Åland and Finland national under-21 football team. Mäkinen was born in Mariehamn, Finland.

== Club career ==
=== IFK Mariehamn ===
He began his senior club career playing for IFK Mariehamn, and made his league debut for at age 18 in 2014. After winning his first trophy, the Finnish Cup, during his first full season on league level, he helped IFK Marehamn win the Veikkausliiga.

=== Renate ===
On 1 January 2017 Mäkinen signed a contract with A.C. Renate.

=== Return to IFK Mariehamn ===
On 17 January 2018, Mäkinen signed a one-year contract with IFK Mariehamn.

=== FC Åland ===
FC Åland announced the signing of Mäkinen for the 2019 season. The deal was already announced on 7 November 2018.

== International career ==
Mäkinen has represented Finland on youth level. He made his debut in the UEFA European Under-19 Championship qualifications in on 8 October 2015 in a match against Italy.

== Career statistics ==
=== Club ===
As of 10 August 2019

Appearances and goals by club, season and competition
Club	Season	League			National Cups		Europe		Total	
Club	Season	Division	Apps	Goals	Apps	Goals	Apps	Goals	Apps	Goals
IFK Mariehamn	2013	Veikkausliiga	0	0	1	0	—		1	0
IFK Mariehamn	2014	Veikkausliiga	1	0	4	1	—		2	1
IFK Mariehamn	2015	Veikkausliiga	19	0	5	0	—		24	0
IFK Mariehamn	2016	Veikkausliiga	20	1	5	1	1 (Note: Appearances in the Europa League)	0	26	2
IFK Mariehamn	Total		40	1	15	2	1	0	56	3
FC Åland (loan)	2016	Kakkonen	4	0	0	0	—		4	0
Renate	2016–17	Serie C	2	0	0	0	—		2	0
Renate	2017–18	Serie C	0	0	0	0	—		0	0
Renate	Total		2	0	0	0	—		2	0
IFK Mariehamn	2018	Veikkausliiga	29	3	5	2	—		34	5
FC Åland	2019	Kolmonen	17	2	2	1	—		19	3
Career total			92	6	22	5	1	0	115	11

== Honours and achievements ==
=== Club ===
IFK Marehamn

- Veikkausliiga: 2016
- Finnish Cup: 2015
