= Jami Wallenius =

Finnish football coach and former player (born 1967)

Personal information
- Date of birth: 20 January 1967 (age 59)
- Place of birth: Turku, Finland
- Height: 1.78 m (5 ft 10 in)
- Position: Defender

Youth career
- TuTo

Senior career*
Years	Team	Apps	(Gls)
1985–1990	TuTo	57	(0)
1991–1993	Jaro	73	(2)
1994–2001	Inter Turku	189	(1)
2002	VG-62	2	(0)

Managerial career
- 2002–2007: VG-62
- 2008: Sinimustat
- 2008–2016: Inter Turku (assistant)
- 2016: Inter Turku (caretaker)
- 2019–2021: Åbo IFK
- 2022–2023: Inter Turku U19
- 2023: PIF
- * Club domestic league appearances and goals

Jami Wallenius (born 20 January 1967) is a Finnish football coach and a former footballer who played as a defender.

== Career ==
During his playing career, Wallenius made 190 appearances and scored two goals in top-tier Veikkausliiga for Inter Turku and Jaro. He also played for Turun Toverit and VG-62 in lower divisions.

After retirement as a player, he first continued coaching in VG-62. For the 2028 season, he was named the head coach of Sinimustat, the reserve team of Inter Turku. During 2008–2016, Wallenius worked as an assistant coach of the club's first team, and in 2016 after the departure of Job Dragtsma, he was named an interim manager.

During 2019–2021, Wallenius coached Åbo IFK first team.

In September 2023, he was named the head coach of Pargas IF.

== Personal life ==
His father Arto Wallenius is a former long-time kit manager of Inter Turku.
