= Tommy Wirtanen =

Finnish footballer (born 1983)

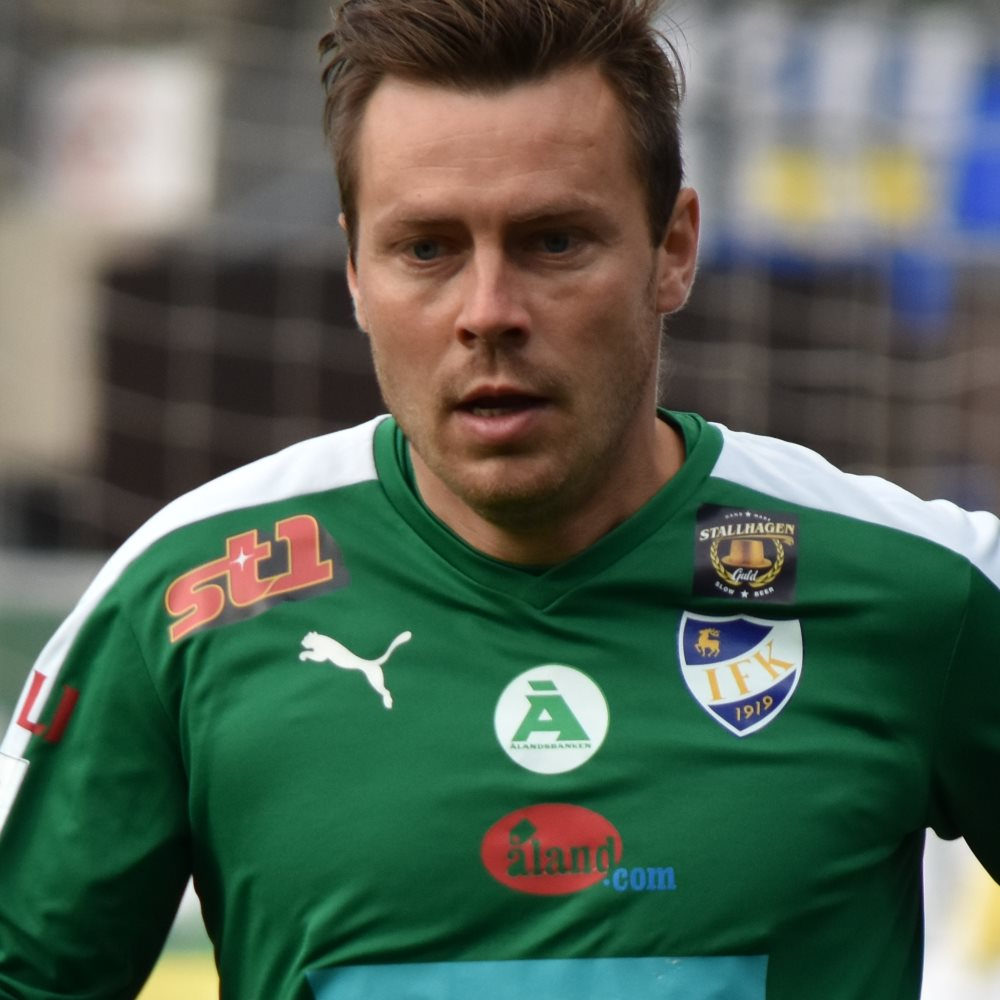

Personal information
- Full name: Tommy Wirtanen
- Date of birth: 19 January 1983 (age 43)
- Place of birth: Mariehamn, Åland, Finland
- Height: 1.77 m (5 ft 10 in)
- Position: Winger

Youth career
- IFK Mariehamn

Senior career*
| Years | Team | Apps | (Gls) |
| 1999–2009 | IFK Mariehamn | 180 | (15) |
| 2009–2012 | Örebro SK | 59 | (2) |
| 2012–2017 | IFK Mariehamn | 74 | (2) |
- * Club domestic league appearances and goals

Tommy Wirtanen (born 19 January 1983) is a Finnish former footballer. He usually played as a winger and is well known for his great pace.

== Career ==
=== IFK Mariehamn ===
Before joining Örebro SK, Wirtanen played for IFK Mariehamn in his native Finland. It's also the only other club he has represented. While at IFK Mariehamn, Wirtanen made 180 first team appearances and scored 15 goals from 2000 to 2008. He was a part of the team that promoted IFK Mariehamn to the Finnish First Division in 2003 and the following season all the way to the Premier Division.

=== Örebro SK ===
On 19 December 2008 it was made official that Wirtanen would join Swedish Örebro SK on a two-year-contract. Wirtanen is one of three Finns currently at Örebro, the other ones being Roni Porokara and Fredrik Nordback.
