= Peter Lundberg =

Finnish footballer and manager (born 1981)

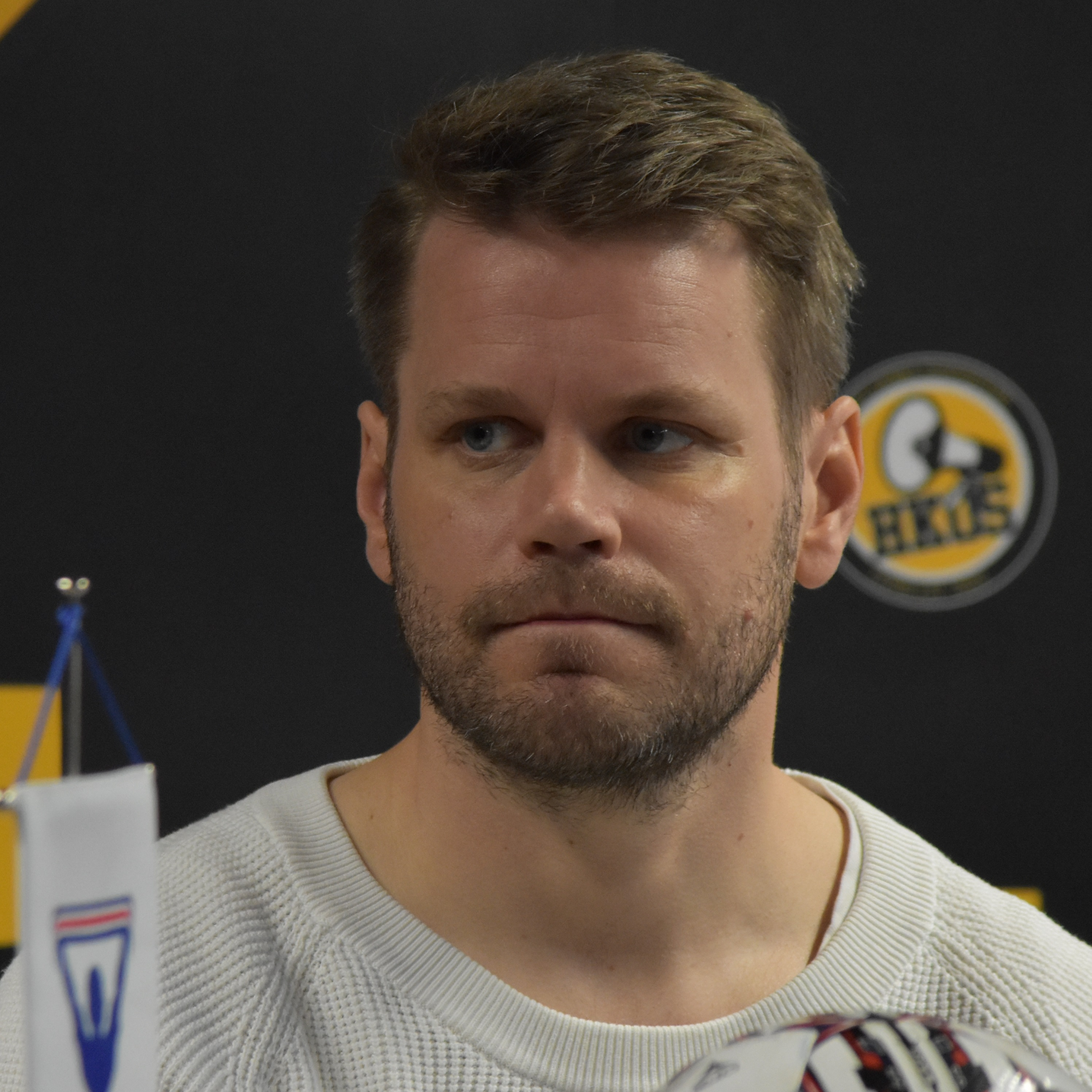
- Lundberg as IFK Mariehamn manager in 2018

Personal information
- Date of birth: 15 April 1981 (age 45)
- Place of birth: Finström, Finland
- Height: 1.80 m (5 ft 11 in)
- Position: Forward

Team information
- Current team: Finland U18 & U19 (head coach)

Senior career*
Years	Team	Apps	(Gls)
2000–2007	IFK Mariehamn	129	(61)
2006–2007	IFFK	33	(18)
2008–2011	Rynninge IK	71	(52)

International career^{‡}
2011	Åland Islands	4	(5)

Managerial career
- 2012–2015: IFK Mariehamn (Assistant)
- 2016–2019: IFK Mariehamn
- 2020–: Finland U18
- 2020–: Finland U19
- * Club domestic league appearances and goals as of 2015 ‡ National team caps and goals as of 2015

Peter Lundberg is a Finnish football manager and former player, managing Finland U19 and Finland U18.

In 2016, Lundberg managed his local club IFK Mariehamn to win their first-ever Finnish Championship title.

== International career ==
=== International goals ===
Scores and results list Åland Islands' tally first.

No	Date	Venue	Opponent	Score	Result	Competition
1.	26 June 2011	Beatrice Avenue, East Cowes, Isle of Wight	Saaremaa	1–2	3–2	2011 Island Games
2.	27 June 2011	St Georges Park, Newport, Isle of Wight	Western Isles	1–0	2–0	2011 Island Games
3.	27 June 2011	St Georges Park, Newport, Isle of Wight	Western Isles	2–0	2–0	2011 Island Games
4.	30 June 2011	Vicarage Lane, Brading, Isle of Wight	Guernsey	1–0	2–3	2011 Island Games
5.	30 June 2011	Vicarage Lane, Brading, Isle of Wight	Guernsey	2–2	2–3	2011 Island Games

== Honours ==
IFK Mariehamn

- Veikkausliiga: 2016

Individual

- Finnish Football Manager of the Year: 2016
- Veikkausliiga Manager of the Year: 2016
- Veikkausliiga Manager of the Month: April 2016, October 2016
