= Josef Ibrahim =

Swedish footballer (born 1991)

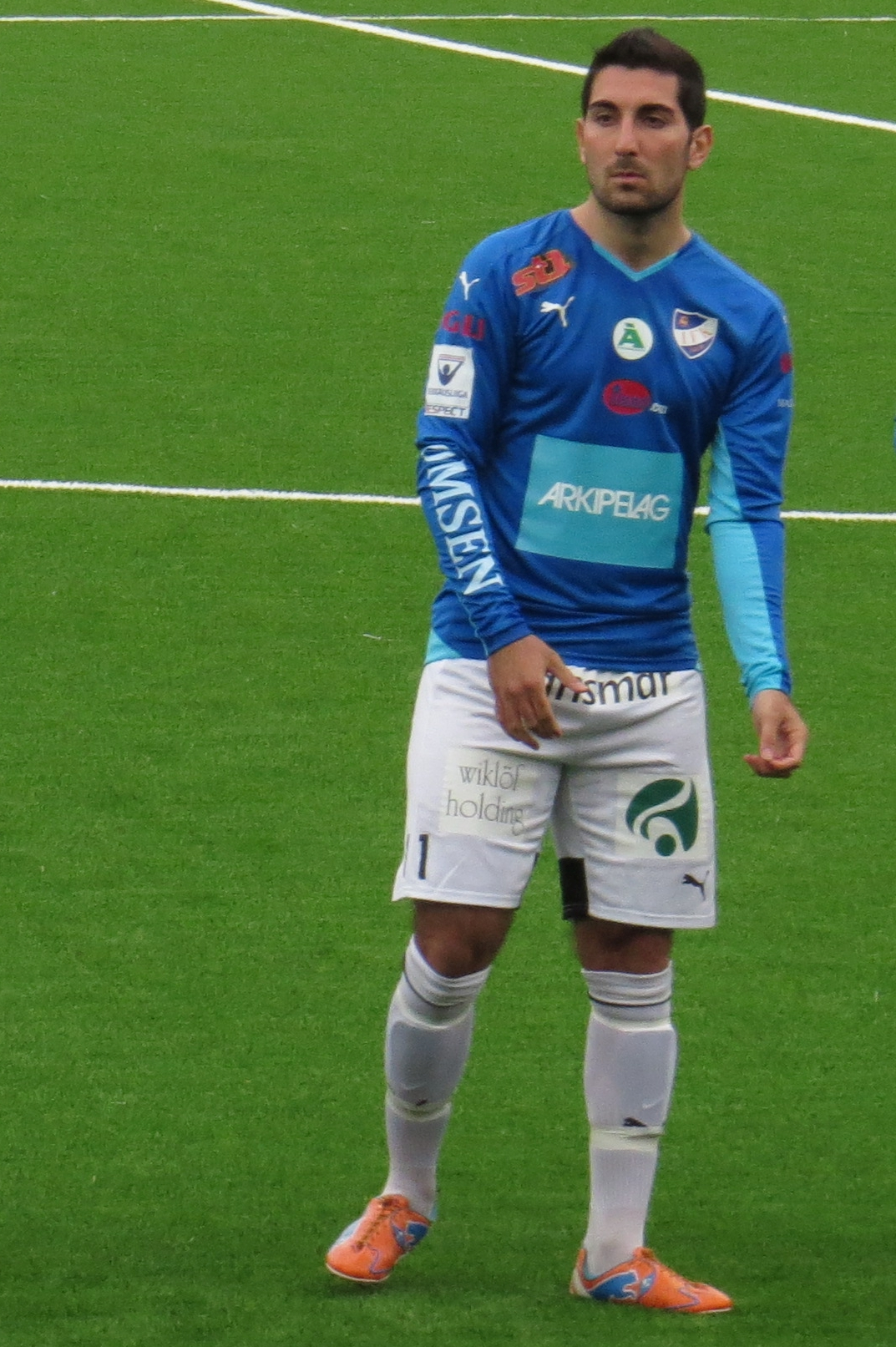
- Ibrahim with IFK Mariehamn in 2015

Personal information
- Date of birth: 13 March 1991 (age 35)
- Place of birth: Stockholm, Sweden
- Height: 1.75 m (5 ft 9 in)
- Position: Wide midfielder

Team information
- Current team: Örebro Syrianska IF
- Number: 9

Youth career
- BK Forward

Senior career*
Years	Team	Apps	(Gls)
2007–2010	BK Forward	46	(6)
2011–2013	Örebro SK	7	(0)
2011–2013	→ Örebro SK Ungdom	4	(1)
2012	→ Syrianska FC (loan)	2	(0)
2013–2016	IFK Mariehamn	56	(11)
2016	→ Åland (loan)	2	(1)
2016–2017	Syrianska FC	7	(0)
2017–2018	BK Forward	15	(12)
2018–2019	Degerfors IF	9	(0)
2019	→ BK Forward (loan)	23	(9)
2020–2022	BK Forward	51	(47)
2023–	Örebro Syrianska IF	13	(3)
- * Club domestic league appearances and goals as of 7 August 2023

Josef Ibrahim (born 13 March 1991) is a Swedish professional footballer who plays as a left midfielder for Örebro Syrianska IF.

Ibrahim has spent the majority of his career playing for Swedish and Finnish clubs, most notably Örebro SK and IFK Mariehamn.

== Club career ==
On 10 August 2018, Ibrahim signed with Degerfors IF on a contract running until 2020. Degerford announced on 14 February 2019, that they had loaned Ibrahim back to his former club BK Forward for the 2019 season.

== International career ==
In March 2013, Ibrahim was called up to the Lebanon national team by coach Giuseppe Giannini for an 2015 AFC Asian Cup qualification match against Thailand. However, he was unable to play due to paperwork-related issues.

== Personal life ==
Ibrahim's parents, originally from Zahlé, Lebanon, immigrated to Sweden during the 1980s as a result of the Lebanese Civil War. Ibrahim was born and raised in the Vivalla district of Örebro.
