= Craig Wight =

Scottish footballer

Personal information
- Date of birth: 24 July 1978 (age 48)
- Place of birth: Bellshill, Scotland
- Position: Goalkeeper

College career
Years	Team	Apps	(Gls)
2002	LW Blue Raiders	13	(0)
2004–2005	Cumberland Phoenix		

Senior career*
Years	Team	Apps	(Gls)
1997–2002	Arbroath	41	(0)
2006–2007	Livingston	18	(0)
2007–2008	Arbroath	15	(0)
2008	East Fife	11	(0)
2011–2012	Raith Rovers	0	(0)
2012–2014	Cowdenbeath	2	(0)
2014–2015	Berwick Rangers	0	(0)
2016–2017	Mariehamn	0	(0)
2016	→ FC Åland (loan)	1	(0)
2018	Stirling Albion	5	(0)

Managerial career
- 2008: LW Blue Raiders (assistant)
- 2012–2014: Cowdenbeath (goalkeeping coach)
- 2014–2015: Berwick Rangers (goalkeeping coach)
- 2016–2017: FC Åland (assistant)
- 2016: FC Åland (interim)
- 2018: Stirling Albion (goalkeeping coach)
- 2018–2020: Carlisle United (goalkeeping coach)
- 2020–2022: Yeovil Town (goalkeeping coach)
- * Club domestic league appearances and goals

Craig Wight (born 24 July 1978) is a Scottish former footballer who played as a goalkeeper.

== Club career ==
Wight started his career with Arbroath in 1997, before leaving in 2002. He spent time at the Kentucky-based Lindsey Wilson College and Tennessee-based Cumberland University in America, before returning to Scotland to play for Livingston. He then returned to Arbroath in 2007, before joining East Fife in the January 2008 transfer market.

After a short career break, in which he returned to the Lindsey Wilson College to assume the position of assistant manager, Wight returned with First Division side Raith Rovers, but failed to make an appearance before joining fellow First Division side Cowdenbeath, initially as a goalkeeping coach. Wight made two appearances during his time with the Cowdenbeath-based side.

After a short spell with lower division side Berwick Rangers as a player-goalkeeping coach, Wight moved to Finland to join Veikkausliiga side IFK Mariehamn in 2016, while also working as a goalkeeping coach and assistant manager for Kakkonen side FC Åland. He was named interim manager for the end of the 2016 season.
