= IF Finströms Kamraterna =

Finnish sports club

- Full name: IF Finströms Kamraterna
- Nickname: IFFK
- Founded: 1922
- Ground: Markusböle
- Chairman: Daniel Melander
- League: Kolmonen (former)
Home colours	Away colours

IF Finströms Kamraterna (also known as IF Finströmskamraterna; IFFK) is a sports and football club in Åland. The football team last played in the Kolmonen of the Finnish football league before switching to youth football.

The home arena lies in Finström, a small countryside municipality on the Åland islands. The team has been the most popular and successful team on the Åland islands decades ago, playing almost regularly at the second level of the Finland's only and amateur Football League.
