= 2016 Veikkausliiga =

Veikkausliiga
- Season: 2016
- Champions: IFK Mariehamn; 1st Veikkausliiga title
- Relegated: PK-35 Vantaa
- Champions League: IFK Mariehamn
- Europa League: HJK; SJK; VPS
- Matches: 198
- Goals: 459 (2.32 per match)
- Top goalscorer: Roope Riski (17 goals)
- Biggest home win: RoPS 5–0 PS Kemi (10 August); SJK 5–0 PK-35 Vantaa (17 October)
- Biggest away win: IFK Mariehamn 2–5 HIFK (7 August); HJK 1–4 FC Lahti (12 September)
- Highest scoring: PK-35 Vantaa 3–4 RoPS (2 April); IFK Mariehamn 2–5 HIFK (7 August)

The 2016 Veikkausliiga is the 86th season of top-tier football in Finland. The season started on 2 April 2016; the regular season ended on 23 October 2016, with a promotion/relegation playoff continuing until 29 October. SJK were the defending champions.

== Teams ==
FF Jaro were relegated to Ykkönen after finishing at the bottom of the 2015 season. Their place was taken by Ykkönen champions PS Kemi.

KTP as 11th-placed team lost their Veikkausliiga spot after losing to second-placed Ykkönen team PK-35 Vantaa 3–2 on aggregate in a relegation/promotion playoff.

=== Stadia and locations ===
Location of teams in 2016 Veikkausliiga

| Club | Location | Stadium | Capacity |
|---|---|---|---|
| FC Inter | Turku | Veritas Stadion | 10,000 |
| FC Lahti | Lahti | Lahden kisapuisto | 4,000 |
| HIFK | Helsinki | Sonera Stadium | 10,770 |
| HJK | Helsinki | Sonera Stadium | 10,770 |
| IFK Mariehamn | Mariehamn | Wiklöf Holding Arena | 4,000 |
| Ilves | Tampere | Tammela Stadion | 5,040 |
| KuPS | Kuopio | Savon Sanomat Areena | 5,000 |
| PK-35 Vantaa | Vantaa | Myyrmäen jalkapallostadion | 4,500 |
| PS Kemi | Kemi | Sauvosaaren Urheilupuisto | 4,500 |
| RoPS | Rovaniemi | Rovaniemen keskuskenttä | 4,000 |
| SJK | Seinäjoki | OmaSP Stadion | 6,000 |
| VPS | Vaasa | Hietalahti Stadium | 4,600 |

- SJK will move to their new stadium OmaSp Stadion in June 2016 (capacity 6,000).

=== Personnel and kits ===
| Club | Manager | Captain | Kit manufacturer | Sponsors |
|---|---|---|---|---|
| FC Inter | (Finland) Shefki Kuqi | (Finland) Henri Lehtonen | Nike | Alfons Håkans |
| FC Lahti | (Finland) Toni Korkeakunnas | (Finland) Mikko Hauhia | Umbro | BE Group; Lahti Energia; Halton |
| HIFK | (Finland) Antti Muurinen | (Finland) Esa Terävä | Kappa/Puma (Note: HIFK switched from Kappa to Puma kits mid-season.) | Aktia Bank |
| HJK | (Finland) Mika Lehkosuo | (Finland) Sebastian Sorsa | Adidas | Apu |
| IFK Mariehamn | (Finland) Kari Virtanen (Finland) Peter Lundberg | (Finland) Jani Lyyski | Puma | Hotell Arkipelag |
| Ilves | (Finland) Jarkko Wiss | (Finland) Antti Hynynen | Adidas | Various |
| KuPS | (Finland) Marko Rajamäki | (Finland) Petteri Pennanen | Puma | Laitilan Wirvoitusjuomatehdas |
| PK-35 Vantaa | (Finland) Pasi Pihamaa | (Finland) Kim Raimi | Nike | Vantaan Energia |
| PS Kemi | (Finland) Jari Åhman | (England) Billy Ions | Stanno | Various |
| RoPS | (Finland) Juha Malinen | (Finland) Antti Okkonen | Puma | Saraware |
| SJK | (Finland) Simo Valakari | (Estonia) Mihkel Aksalu | Adidas | LähiTapiola; EPKK; Prima Power |
| VPS | (Finland) Petri Vuorinen | (Finland) Ville Koskimaa | Puma | Various |

=== Managerial changes ===
| Team | Outgoing manager | Manner of departure | Date of vacancy | Incoming manager | Date of appointment | Table |
|---|---|---|---|---|---|---|
| Ilves | (Italy) Marco Baruffato | End of contract | n/a | (Finland) Jarkko Wiss | 6 November 2015 | Pre-season |
| IFK Mariehamn | (Finland) Pekka Lyyski | End of contract | n/a | (Finland) Kari Virtanen (Finland) Peter Lundberg | 19 November 2015 | Pre-season |
| FC Inter | (Netherlands) Job Dragtsma | Mutual termination | 26 May 2016 | (Finland) Jami Wallenius (as caretaker) | 26 May 2016 | 7th |
| PK-35 Vantaa | (Finland) Shefki Kuqi | Mutual termination | 27 July 2016 | (Finland) Pasi Pihamaa | 27 July 2016 | 12th |
| HIFK | (Finland) Jani Honkavaara | Sacked | 27 July 2016 | (Finland) Antti Muurinen | 28 July 2016 | 11th |
| FC Inter | (Finland) Jami Wallenius (as caretaker) | Mutual termination | 3 August 2016 | (Finland) Shefki Kuqi | 3 August 2016 | 10th |

== League table ==
| Pos | Team | Pld | W | D | L | GF | GA | GD | Pts | Qualification or relegation |
|---|---|---|---|---|---|---|---|---|---|---|
| 1 | IFK Mariehamn (C) | 33 | 17 | 10 | 6 | 40 | 25 | +15 | 61 | Qualification for the Champions League second qualifying round |
| 2 | HJK | 33 | 16 | 10 | 7 | 52 | 36 | +16 | 58 | Qualification for the Europa League first qualifying round (Note: SJK qualified for the Europa League first qualifying round by winning the 2016 Finnish Cup.) |
| 3 | SJK | 33 | 17 | 6 | 10 | 49 | 36 | +13 | 57 | Qualification for the Europa League first qualifying round |
| 4 | VPS | 33 | 15 | 8 | 10 | 36 | 27 | +9 | 53 | Qualification for the Europa League first qualifying round |
| 5 | Ilves | 33 | 15 | 7 | 11 | 36 | 35 | +1 | 52 | |
| 6 | RoPS | 33 | 13 | 11 | 9 | 43 | 33 | +10 | 50 | |
| 7 | KuPS | 33 | 14 | 7 | 12 | 37 | 31 | +6 | 49 | |
| 8 | Lahti | 33 | 10 | 12 | 11 | 42 | 43 | −1 | 42 | |
| 9 | PS Kemi Kings | 33 | 10 | 5 | 18 | 29 | 48 | −19 | 35 | |
| 10 | HIFK | 33 | 8 | 10 | 15 | 35 | 39 | −4 | 34 | |
| 11 | Inter Turku (O) | 33 | 7 | 11 | 15 | 28 | 41 | −13 | 32 | Qualification for the relegation play-offs |
| 12 | PK-35 Vantaa (Note: PK-35 Vantaa were deducted 6 points for overdue debts.) (R) | 33 | 4 | 7 | 22 | 32 | 65 | −33 | 13 | Relegation to the Ykkönen |

Source: Veikkausliiga (in Finnish), Soccerway
Rules for classification: 1) Points; 2) Goal difference; 3) Goals scored; 4) Head-to-head points; 5) Head-to-head goal difference; 6) Head-to-head away goals scored; 7) Play-off
(Note: Play-off is only played if need to decide champion, teams for relegation or UEFA competition and will be played on a neutral ground).
(C) Champions; (O) Play-off winners; (R) Relegated

== Results ==
=== Matches 1–22 ===
| Home \ Away | INT | LAH | HIFK | HJK | MAR | ILV | KPS | PKV | PSK | RPS | SJK | VPS |
|---|---|---|---|---|---|---|---|---|---|---|---|---|
| FC Inter | | 1–1 | 1–0 | 0–0 | 0–2 | 1–0 | 3–1 | 2–2 | 0–2 | 1–2 | 1–3 | 0–2 |
| FC Lahti | 1–0 | | 2–2 | 1–2 | 1–1 | 3–2 | 0–0 | 2–1 | 1–0 | 1–2 | 3–0 | 4–0 |
| HIFK | 1–2 | 2–2 | | 0–0 | 0–1 | 0–1 | 3–2 | 1–2 | 0–0 | 1–1 | 1–1 | 0–1 |
| HJK | 3–1 | 2–2 | 2–1 | | 2–0 | 5–1 | 2–3 | 4–2 | 2–0 | 1–1 | 2–1 | 3–1 |
| IFK Mariehamn | 0–0 | 3–0 | 2–5 | 0–0 | | 3–1 | 0–3 | 0–0 | 2–0 | 1–0 | 1–0 | 2–2 |
| Ilves | 0–0 | 2–0 | 3–1 | 1–0 | 0–1 | | 1–0 | 2–0 | 1–1 | 1–1 | 2–1 | 1–0 |
| KuPS | 2–1 | 2–0 | 1–0 | 0–0 | 1–0 | 0–1 | | 2–3 | 2–0 | 1–1 | 0–0 | 1–0 |
| PK-35 Vantaa | 3–1 | 1–1 | 0–2 | 1–2 | 0–2 | 1–1 | 1–1 | | 2–2 | 3–4 | 0–0 | 0–2 |
| PS Kemi | 3–1 | 2–1 | 1–2 | 1–0 | 1–2 | 1–0 | 0–2 | 2–1 | | 0–2 | 3–0 (Note: The match originally finished 0–2, but the result was changed to 3–0, as SJK fielded ineligible players.) | 0–0 |
| RoPS | 2–1 | 0–0 | 1–0 | 2–2 | 0–0 | 1–0 | 0–1 | 1–0 | 5–0 | | 2–3 | 2–0 |
| SJK | 1–0 | 4–1 | 2–1 | 2–3 | 0–1 | 0–2 | 1–0 | 3–2 | 1–0 | 3–1 | | 1–0 |
| VPS | 0–0 | 1–0 | 3–1 | 3–0 | 0–2 | 2–0 | 3–0 | 2–1 | 0–1 | 1–0 | 2–1 | |

Source: veikkausliiga.com
Legend: Blue = home team win; Yellow = draw; Red = away team win.

=== Matches 23–33 ===
| Home \ Away | INT | LAH | HIFK | HJK | MAR | ILV | KPS | PKV | PSK | RPS | SJK | VPS |
|---|---|---|---|---|---|---|---|---|---|---|---|---|
| FC Inter | | | 0–0 | 3–2 | | 0–1 | | | 0–0 | 1–1 | | 1–1 |
| FC Lahti | 1–2 | | 0–0 | | 0–2 | 0–0 | 1–1 | 2–0 | | | | |
| HIFK | | | | 2–1 | | | 0–2 | | 3–1 | | 3–1 | 0–1 |
| HJK | | 1–4 | | | 1–1 | | 1–0 | 2–0 | | 2–1 | 0–0 | |
| IFK Mariehamn | 1–1 | | 1–0 | | | 2–1 | | 4–2 | 1–0 | | | 0–0 |
| Ilves | | | 1–1 | 1–3 | | | | | 2–0 | 2–1 | | 0–0 |
| KuPS | 0–2 | | | | 2–1 | 1–2 | | 3–0 | 1–0 | | | |
| PK-35 Vantaa | 2–1 | | 0–2 | | | 1–3 | | | 0–1 | | | 1–2 |
| PS Kemi | | 2–4 | | 0–2 | | | | | | 3–1 | 1–3 | 1–4 |
| RoPS | | 3–0 | 0–0 | | 1–1 | | 2–1 | 1–0 | | | 1–1 | |
| SJK | 1–0 | 2–2 | | | 1–0 | 4–0 | 1–0 | 5–0 | | | | |
| VPS | | 0–1 | | 0–0 | | | 1–1 | | | 1–0 | 1–2 | |

Source: veikkausliiga.com
Legend: Blue = home team win; Yellow = draw; Red = away team win.

=== Relegation play-offs ===
26 October 2016
15:00

| TPS | 0–0 | Inter Turku |
|---|---|---|
| | Report |

Paavo Nurmi Stadium
Attendance: 4,216

29 October 2016
17:00

| Inter Turku | 2–0 | TPS |
|---|---|---|
| Manev 49'; Nebihi 89' | Report |

Veritas Stadion
Attendance: 6,855

== Statistics ==
=== Top scorers ===
Source: veikkausliiga.com (in Finnish)

As of 23 October 2016.

| Rank | Player | Club | Goals |
|---|---|---|---|
| 1 | (Finland) Roope Riski | SJK | 17 |
| 2 | (Finland) Njazi Kuqi | PK-35 Vantaa / FC Inter | 16 |
| 2 | (Colombia) Alfredo Morelos | HJK | 16 |
| 4 | (Nigeria) Gbolahan Salami | KuPS | 14 |
| 5 | (England) Billy Ions | PS Kemi / SJK | 13 |
| 6 | (Jamaica) Dever Orgill | IFK Mariehamn | 12 |
| 7 | (Finland) Robert Taylor | RoPS | 11 |
| 8 | (Finland) Pyry Soiri | VPS | 10 |
| 8 | (Finland) Jasse Tuominen | FC Lahti | 10 |
| 10 | (Finland) Lauri Ala-Myllymäki | Ilves | 9 |
| 10 | (Finland) Aleksandr Kokko | RoPS | 9 |
| 10 | (Finland) Jussi Vasara | SJK | 9 |
| 13 | 3 players | | 8 |
| 16 | 5 players | | 7 |
| 21 | 4 players | | 6 |
| 25 | 5 players | | 5 |
| 30 | 10 players | | 4 |
| 40 | 9 players | | 3 |
| 49 | 30 players | | 2 |
| 79 | 72 players | | 1 |

== Awards ==
| Month | Coach of the Month | Player of the Month |
|---|---|---|
| April | (Finland) Peter Lundberg (IFK Mariehamn) (Finland) Kari Virtanen (IFK Mariehamn) | (Finland) Walter Viitala (IFK Mariehamn) |
| May | (Finland) Mika Lehkosuo (HJK) | (Nigeria) Taye Taiwo (HJK) |
| June | (Finland) Juha Malinen (RoPS) | (Finland) Roope Riski (SJK) |
| July | (Finland) Petri Vuorinen (VPS) | (Finland) Pyry Soiri (VPS) |
| August | (Finland) Jari Åhman (PS Kemi) | (Sweden) Erik Törnros (PS Kemi) |
| September | (Finland) Jarkko Wiss (Ilves) | (Colombia) Alfredo Morelos (HJK) |
| October | (Finland) Peter Lundberg (IFK Mariehamn) (Finland) Kari Virtanen (IFK Mariehamn) | (Finland) Jani Lyyski (IFK Mariehamn) |

=== Annual awards ===
| Award | Winner | Club |
|---|---|---|
| Player of the Year | (Senegal) Emile Paul Tendeng | Ilves |
| Goalkeeper of the Year | (Finland) Walter Viitala | Mariehamn |
| Defender of the Year | (Finland) Jani Lyyski | Mariehamn |
| Midfielder of the Year | (Senegal) Emile Paul Tendeng | Ilves |
| Striker of the Year | (Colombia) Alfredo Morelos | HJK |
| Breakthrough of the Year | (Finland) Mikael Soisalo | Ilves |
| Coach of the Year | (Finland) Peter Lundberg | Mariehamn |

=== Team of the Year ===

Team of the Year
| Goalkeeper | (Finland) Walter Viitala (Mariehamn) | | | |
| Defence | (Finland) Albin Granlund (Mariehamn) | (Finland) Jani Lyyski (Mariehamn) | (Finland) Kristian Kojola (Mariehamn) | (Nigeria) Taye Taiwo (HJK) |
| Midfield | (Finland) Mikael Soisalo (Ilves) | (Finland) Mika Väyrynen (HIFK) | (Japan) Atomu Tanaka (HJK) | (Senegal) Emile Tendeng (Ilves) |
| Attack | (Finland) Roope Riski (SJK) | | (Colombia) Alfredo Morelos (HJK) | |

== Attendances ==
| No. | Club | Average | Change | Highest |
|---|---|---|---|---|
| 1 | HJK | 5,101 | −3.4% | 10,500 |
| 2 | HIFK | 3,632 | +17.9% | 10,500 |
| 3 | Ilves | 3,351 | +2.6% | 5,050 |
| 4 | SJK | 3,103 | +15.4% | 5,817 |
| 5 | VPS | 2,935 | +40.0% | 5,987 |
| 6 | Inter Turku | 2,255 | −7.6% | 4,760 |
| 7 | KuPS | 2,098 | −10.0% | 4,457 |
| 8 | Lahti | 2,052 | −3.9% | 3,647 |
| 9 | RoPS | 1,763 | −22.6% | 3,024 |
| 10 | Kemi | 1,551 | +59.3% | 3,976 |
| 11 | Mariehamn | 1,503 | +15.3% | 4,335 |
| 12 | PK-35 | 1,229 | +103.1% | 2,832 |
