= 2019 RoPS season =

RoPS
2019 season
- Chairman: Risto Niva
- Manager: Pasi Tuutti
- Stadium: Rovaniemen keskuskenttä
- Veikkausliiga: 10th
- Finnish Cup: Quarterfinal vs KPV
- UEFA Europa League: First Qualifying Round vs Aberdeen
- Top goalscorer: League: Youness Rahimi (5); All: Two Players (5)
Home colours	Away colours

The 2019 season was RoPS's 7th Veikkausliiga season since their promotion back to the top flight in 2012. RoPS finished the season in 10th position, reached the Quarterfinals of the Finnish Cup where they were knocked out by KPV and the first qualifying round of the UEFA Europa League where they were beaten by Aberdeen.

== Squad ==
As of 2 August 2019

Note: Flags indicate national team as defined under FIFA eligibility rules; some limited exceptions apply. Players may hold more than one non-FIFA nationality.

No.	Pos.	Nation	Player
2	DF	FIN	Henrik Ölander
3	DF	NGR	Taye Taiwo
4	MF	ESP	Jagoba Beobide
5	DF	FIN	Kalle Katz (on loan from HJK)
6	DF	FIN	Atte Sihvonen
7	MF	FIN	Youness Rahimi
8	MF	ESP	Sergio Llamas
10	MF	FIN	Lucas Lingman
11	FW	FIN	Aleksandr Kokko
12	GK	FIN	Mikko Rantala
14	MF	FIN	Eetu Muinonen
15	DF	FIN	Kevin Kouassivi-Benissan (on loan from HJK)
17	FW	FIN	Sampo Ala
18	FW	FIN	Veka Pyyny

No.	Pos.	Nation	Player
19	MF	FIN	Tuomas Kaukua
20	DF	FIN	Juho Hyvärinen
21	FW	FIN	Matias Tamminen
22	MF	FIN	Rasmus Degerman
23	FW	FIN	Niklas Jokelainen
24	MF	FIN	Tommi Jäntti
25	GK	ESP	Antonio Reguero
26	DF	FIN	Eerik Kantola
27	DF	NGR	Samuel Olabisi
33	MF	BRA	Agnaldo
34	MF	NED	Tarik Kada
35	GK	FIN	Juhani Kangas
88	DF	FRA	Mohamadou Sissoko

== Transfers ==
=== In ===
Date	Position	Nationality	Name	From	Fee	Ref.
13 November 2018	DF	(Finland)	Henrik Ölander	Kemi City	Undisclosed	
13 November 2018	MF	(Finland)	Tommi Jäntti	Klubi 04	Undisclosed	
13 November 2018	FW	(Finland)	Niklas Jokelainen	Ilves	Undisclosed	
21 December 2018	DF	(Finland)	Atte Sihvonen	Ekenäs	Undisclosed	
1 February 2019	GK	(North Macedonia)	Damjan Shishkovski	Lahti	Undisclosed	
5 February 2019	MF	(Spain)	Sergio Llamas	Alavés	Undisclosed	
13 February 2019	DF	(France)	Mohamadou Sissoko	Kardemir Karabükspor	Undisclosed	
21 February 2019	MF	(Netherlands)	Tarik Kada	Heracles Almelo	Undisclosed	
27 February 2019	MF	(Brazil)	Agnaldo	Molde	Undisclosed	
10 April 2019	FW	(Finland)	Youness Rahimi	Honka	Undisclosed	
30 July 2019	MF	(Spain)	Jagoba Beobide	Burgos	Undisclosed	

=== Loans in ===
Start date	Position	Nationality	Name	From	End date	Ref.
7 January 2019	DF	(Finland)	Kalle Katz	HJK	End of Season	
2 August 2019	DF	(Finland)	Kevin Kouassivi-Benissan	HJK	End of Season	

=== Released ===
Date	Position	Nationality	Name	Joined	Date
30 January 2019	DF	(Finland)	Juuso Hämäläinen	Inter Turku	
30 January 2019	DF	(Finland)	Lassi Järvenpää	IFK Mariehamn	
30 January 2019	DF	(Haiti)	Jems Geffrard	Fresno	
30 January 2019	DF	(Japan)	Fugo Segawa	AC Oulu	
30 January 2019	MF	(Finland)	Antti Okkonen	Retired	
30 January 2019	MF	(Georgia (country))	Giorgi Gorozia	Locomotive Tbilisi	
30 January 2019	FW	(Finland)	Vahid Hambo	Astra Giurgiu	
30 January 2019	FW	(Finland)	Simo Roiha	KPV	
21 July 2019	GK	(North Macedonia)	Damjan Shishkovski	Rabotnički	21 July 2019
31 December 2019	DF	(Finland)	Henrik Ölander	AC Oulu	1 January 2020
31 December 2019	DF	(Nigeria)	Taye Taiwo	Doxa Katokopias	3 July 2020
31 December 2019	MF	(Spain)	Jagoba Beobide	Real Unión	22 January 2020
31 December 2019	MF	(Spain)	Sergio Llamas	Real Unión	1 July 2020
31 December 2019	FW	(Finland)	Niklas Jokelainen	AC Oulu	
31 December 2019	DF	(Finland)	Eerik Kantola		
31 December 2019	MF	(Brazil)	Agnaldo	Kastrioti	14 August 2020
31 December 2019	MF	(Netherlands)	Tarik Kada	Al-Ahli	23 January 2020
31 December 2019	GK	(Finland)	Juhani Kangas		
31 December 2019	DF	(France)	Mohamadou Sissoko	Ermis Aradippou	

== Competitions ==
=== Veikkausliiga ===
The 2019 Veikkausliiga season begins on 3 April 2019 and ends on 3 November 2019.

==== Regular season ====
Pos	Team	Pld	W	D	L	GF	GA	GD	Pts	Qualification or relegation (Note: Teams played against each other twice (22 matches) after which the league split in two (top 6 and bottom 6 teams).)
8	FC Lahti	27	9	9	9	29	36	−7	36	Qualification for the national Europa League qualification tournament.
9	SJK	27	7	9	11	18	29	−11	30	
10	RoPS	27	8	6	13	23	35	−12	30	
11	KPV (R)	27	7	4	16	32	47	−15	25	Qualification for the relegation play-offs
12	VPS (R)	27	3	10	14	30	45	−15	19	Relegation to the Ykkönen

Source: Veikkausliiga, Soccerway
Rules for classification: 1) Points; 2) Goal difference; 3) Goals scored; 4) Head-to-head points; 5) Head-to-head goal difference; 6) Head-to-head away goals scored; 7) Play-off
(Note: Play-off is only played if need to decide champion, teams for relegation or UEFA competition and will be played on a neutral ground).
(R) Relegated

==== Results summary ====
Overall								Home						Away					
Pld	W	D	L	GF	GA	GD	Pts	W	D	L	GF	GA	GD	W	D	L	GF	GA	GD
27	8	6	13	23	35	−12	30	5	2	6	12	12	0	3	4	7	11	23	−12

Last updated: 19 October 2019.
Source: See Results

==== Results by matchday ====
Round	1	2	3	4	5	6	7	8	9	10	11	12	13	14	15	16	17	18	19	20	21	22	23	24	25	26	27
Ground	A	H	A	A	H	H	A	H	A	H	H	A	A	H	H	A	H	A	H	A	H	A	A	A	H	H	A
Result	D	L	W	L	L	W	L	L	W	D	L	W	L	D	L	L	L	D	W	D	W	D	L	L	W	W	L

Updated to match(es) played on 19 October 2019. Source: See Results
A = Away; H = Home; W = Win; D = Draw; L = Loss

==== Results ====
3 April 2019 1	KuPS	2 – 2	RoPS	Kuopio
18:30 EEST (UTC+3)	Savolainen (yellow card) 34'; Pennanen 56' (yellow card) 90+2'; Rangel (yellow card) 73' (goal) 83'	Report	Sihvonen 15'; Sissoko (yellow card) 55'; Hyvärinen (yellow card) 58'; Lingman (yellow card) 67'; Ala 90+4'	Stadium: Kuopio Football Stadium; Attendance: 1,876; Referee: Antti Munukka

7 April 2019 2	RoPS	1 – 2	Honka	Rovaniemi
14:00 EEST (UTC+3)	Ala (yellow card) 70'; Jokelainen 81'; Sissoko (yellow card) 83'	Report	Borjas 48'; Baah 71'; Silva (yellow card) 75'; Sumusalo (yellow card) 83'	Stadium: Rovaniemen keskuskenttä Attendance: 1,618; Referee: Oskari Hämäläinen

13 April 2019 3	KPV	0 – 1	RoPS	Kokkola
15:00 EEST (UTC+3)	Helmke (yellow card) 54'	Report	Hyvärinen 66'; Shishkovski (yellow card) 89'	Stadium: Kokkolan Keskuskenttä; Attendance: 459; Referee: Joni Hyytiä

20 April 2019 4	IFK Mariehamn	2 – 0	RoPS	Mariehamn
17:00 EEST (UTC+3)	Crawford (red card) 26'; M'Boma (yellow card) 44'; Ketting 45+4' (yellow card) 79'; Mäenpää (yellow card) 64'; Murnane 66'; Sjöroos (yellow card) 78'	Report	Katz (yellow card) 34'	Stadium: Wiklöf Holding Arena; Attendance: 1,329; Referee: Mohammad Al Emara

26 April 2019 5	RoPS	0 – 1	KuPS	Rovaniemi
18:30 EEST (UTC+3)		Report	Karjalainen 73'	Stadium: Rovaniemen keskuskenttä Attendance: 2,011; Referee: Petri Viljanen

3 May 2019 6	RoPS	1 – 0	HIFK	Rovaniemi
18:30 EEST (UTC+3)	Jäntti 33' (yellow card) 79'	Report	Mäntylä (yellow card) 39'; Dunsby (yellow card) 41'	Stadium: Rovaniemen keskuskenttä Attendance: 1,026; Referee: Mattias Gestranius

7 May 2019 7	Inter Turku	3 – 0	RoPS	Turku
18:30 EEST (UTC+3)	Furuholm 4'; Tenho 7'; Valenčič 25'; Muñiz (yellow card) 65'	Report	Sissoko (yellow card) 36'	Stadium: Veritas Stadion; Attendance: 2,267; Referee: Mikko Leino

12 May 2019 8	RoPS	0 – 1	Ilves	Rovaniemi
18:30 EEST (UTC+3)		Report	Fofana 31'; Addy (yellow card) 44'	Stadium: Rovaniemen keskuskenttä Attendance: 1,363; Referee: Jari Järvinen

20 May 2019 9	VPS	0 – 1	RoPS	Vaasa
18:30 EEST (UTC+3)	Auvinen (yellow card) 65'; Morrissey 76'	Report	Rahimi 51' (yellow card) 86'; Muinonen (yellow card) 58'; Sihvonen (yellow card) 60'	Stadium: Hietalahti Stadium; Attendance: 1,876; Referee: Antti Munukka

25 May 2019 10	RoPS	1 – 1	SJK	Rovaniemi
17:00 EEST (UTC+3)	Katz (yellow card) 43'; Muinonen (yellow card) 59' (goal) 63'	Report	Oliynyk 45+1'; Arthur (yellow card) 61'; Elhi (yellow card) 71'	Stadium: Rovaniemen keskuskenttä Attendance: 767; Referee: Mohammad Al Emara

31 May 2019 11	RoPS	0 – 1	HJK	Rovaniemi
18:30 EEST (UTC+3)	Agnaldo (yellow card) 74'	Report	Riski (yellow card) 32' (goal) 87'; Dahlström (yellow card) 72'	Stadium: Rovaniemen keskuskenttä Attendance: 1,596; Referee: Ville Nevalainen

18 June 2019 12	Lahti	1 – 2	RoPS	Lahti
18:30 EEST (UTC+3)	Klinga (yellow card) 48'; Etock 72'; Lagerblom (yellow card) 88'	Report	Rahimi 5'; Sihvonen (yellow card) 51'; Lingman 65' (yellow card) 84'; Jokelainen (yellow card) 90+2'	Stadium: Lahti Stadium; Attendance: 2,922; Referee: Oskari Hämäläinen

25 June 2019 13	Honka	1 – 0	RoPS	Espoo
18:30 EEST (UTC+3)	Silva 79' (pen.)	Report	Sihvonen (yellow card) 52'; Lingman (yellow card) 82'	Stadium: Tapiolan Urheilupuisto; Attendance: 1,720; Referee: Dennis Antamo

29 June 2019 14	RoPS	0 – 0	KPV	Rovaniemi
22:15 EEST (UTC+3)	Taiwo (red card) 29'	Report	Byskata (yellow card) 75'; Vidjeskog (yellow card) 90+3'	Stadium: Rovaniemen keskuskenttä Attendance: 3,112; Referee: Mikko Leino

6 July 2019 15	RoPS	1 – 2	IFK Mariehamn	Rovaniemi
17:00 EEST (UTC+3)	Sihvonen (yellow card) 37'; Sissoko (yellow card) 46'; Jokelainen 55'; Rahimi (yellow card) 64'	Report	M'Boma 35'; Isaksson 39'; Mäenpää (yellow card) 75'	Stadium: Rovaniemen keskuskenttä Attendance: 1,562; Referee: Oskari Hämäläinen

21 July 2019 16	HIFK	1 – 0	RoPS	Helsinki
17:00 EEST (UTC+3)	Tukiainen 23'; Toró (yellow card) 39'; Selander (yellow card) 90+4'; Hänninen (yellow card) 90+5'	Report	Olabisi (yellow card) 33'; Lingman (yellow card) 89'	Stadium: Telia 5G -areena Attendance: 2,103; Referee: Mikko Leino

28 July 2019 17	RoPS	0 – 2	Inter Turku	Rovaniemi
17:00 EEST (UTC+3)	Kada (red card) 47'; Sissoko (yellow card) 87'; Katz (yellow card) 88'	Report	Ademi 36'; Paananen (yellow card) 59'; Hämäläinen (yellow card) 74'; Kuningas (yellow card) 85'; Valenčič 86'	Stadium: Rovaniemen keskuskenttä Attendance: 1,789; Referee: Oskari Hämäläinen

4 August 2019 18	Ilves	2 – 2	RoPS	Tampere
17:00 EEST (UTC+3)	Ala-Myllymäki 55'; Moussa (yellow card) 86'; Mensah 90+1'	Report	Sihvonen (yellow card) 19'; Lingman 40'; Tamminen 49' (yellow card) 56'	Stadium: Tammelan Stadion; Attendance: 4,421; Referee: Dennis Antamo

11 August 2019 19	RoPS	2 – 1	VPS	Rovaniemi
17:00 EEST (UTC+3)	Rahimi 5'; Tamminen (yellow card) 35' (goal) 59'; Sissoko (yellow card) 44'; Kokko (yellow card) 90+4'	Report	Lahti 17'; Lähde (yellow card) 20'	Stadium: Rovaniemen keskuskenttä Attendance: 1,776; Referee: Kalle Mäkinen

19 August 2019 20	SJK	0 – 0	RoPS	Seinäjoki
18:30 EEST (UTC+3)	Hatakka (yellow card) 65'; Hetemaj (yellow card) 85'; Yaghoubi (yellow card) 89'	Report	Beobide (yellow card) 19'	Stadium: OmaSP Stadion; Attendance: 2,591; Referee: Toni Pohjoismaki

25 August 2019 21	RoPS	3 – 0	Lahti	Rovaniemi
18:30 EEST (UTC+3)	Kouassivi-Benissan 13'; Sihvonen 21'; Rahimi 25' (pen.)	Report	Coubronne (yellow card) 45+3'; Lepistu (red card) 62'; Penninkangas (yellow card) 79'	Stadium: Rovaniemen keskuskenttä Attendance: 1,422; Referee: Jari Järvinen

1 September 2019 22	HJK	2 – 2	RoPS	Helsinki
18:30 EEST (UTC+3)	Riski 4'; Zeneli (yellow card) 38'; Dahlström (yellow card) 45'; Toivomäki (yellow card) 57'; Obilor (yellow card) 65'; Vertainen 73'; Väänänen (yellow card) 85'	Report	Muinonen 24'; Lingman 59'; Sissoko (yellow card) 63'	Stadium: Telia 5G -areena Attendance: 7,931; Referee: Antti Munukka

14 September 2019 23	Lahti	3 – 0	RoPS	Lahti
17:00 EEST (UTC+3)	Amione 42'; Törnros (yellow card) 49'; E.Virta (yellow card) 58' (goal) 61'; Coubronne (yellow card) 62'; Jäntti 90+5'	Report	Beobide (yellow card) 30'; Olabisi (yellow card) 59' (yellow-red card) 83'	Stadium: Lahti Stadium; Attendance: 1,012; Referee: Jari Järvinen

21 September 2019 24	KPV	4 – 1	RoPS	Kokkola
15:00 EEST (UTC+3)	Mannström 31'; Helmke (yellow card) 53'; Banza 74'; Mäkelä 79'; Yartey 84'	Report	Taiwo 11'; Sissoko (yellow card) 81'	Stadium: Kokkolan Keskuskenttä; Attendance: 1,523; Referee: Dennis Antamo

28 September 2019 25	RoPS	2 – 1	VPS	Rovaniemi
17:00 EEST (UTC+3)	Rahimi 60' (pen.); Kokko 68'; Lingman (yellow card) 74'	Report	Holmgren (yellow card) 20'; Strandvall (yellow card) 57'; Kompalla (yellow card) 61'; Lähde (yellow card) 76'; Morrissey 83'; Alanko (yellow card) 90+2'	Stadium: Rovaniemen keskuskenttä Attendance: 1,101; Referee: Oskari Hämäläinen

6 October 2019 26	RoPS	1 – 0	SJK	Rovaniemi
16:00 EET (UTC+3)	Hyvärinen 20'	Report	Arthur (yellow card) 25'; Oliynyk (yellow card) 77' (yellow-red card) 78'	Stadium: Rovaniemen keskuskenttä Attendance: 1,254; Referee: Atte Jussila

19 October 2019 27	HIFK	2 – 0	RoPS	Helsinki
15:00 EEST (UTC+3)	Tukiainen 21'; Mattsson 51'; Bäckman (yellow card) 80'; Mäntylä (yellow card) 86'	Report	Agnaldo (yellow card) 66'	Stadium: Telia 5G -areena Attendance: 1,540; Referee: Mattias Gestranius

=== Finnish Cup ===
==== Sixth round ====
Team	Pld	W	D	L	GF	GA	GD	Pts
FC Ilves	5	4	1	0	12	4	+8	13
VPS	5	3	0	2	5	6	−1	9
KPV	5	2	2	1	6	4	+2	8
RoPS	5	2	1	2	8	9	−1	7
SJK	5	0	2	3	7	10	−3	2
KuPS	5	0	2	3	6	11	−5	2

Source: Finnish Football Association

26 January 2019 1	Ilves	1 – 1	RoPS	Tampere
14:30 EET (UTC+2)	Tomas 57'	Report	Ölander (yellow card) 36'; Tamminen 61' (yellow card) 74'	Stadium: Pirkkahalli C Attendance: 820; Referee: Ville Nevalainen

9 February 2019 2	VPS	2 – 1	RoPS	Vaasa
17:45 EET (UTC+2)	Sarr 31'; Gatambiye (yellow card) 45+3'; Morrissey 45+4'	Report	Jokelainen (yellow card) 28' (goal) 70'	Stadium: Fennia Arena; Attendance: 262; Referee: Toni Pohjoismäki

16 February 2019 3	RoPS	3 – 2	SJK	Seinäjoki
14:00 EET (UTC+2)	Olabisi (yellow card) 3'; Sihvonen 11' (yellow card) 89'; Llamas 44' (yellow card) 57'; Jokelainen 67'; Shishkovski (yellow card) 74'	Report	Kadio 38'; Malolo (yellow card) 63' (yellow-red card) 81'; Lautamaja 88'	Stadium: Wallsport Areena; Attendance: 350; Referee: Atte Jussila

28 February 2019 4	RoPS	0 – 2	KPV	Kajaani
18:30 EET (UTC+2)		Report	Banza 45+1'; H.Heiermann (yellow card) 64'	Stadium: Pallohalli TN; Attendance: 80; Referee: Pietu Niinimäki

3 March 2019 5	RoPS	3 – 2	KuPS	Kajaani
14:00 EET (UTC+2)	Tamminen 80'; Jokelainen 84'; Ala 90+3'; Ölander (yellow card) 90+7'	Report	Niskanen 19'; Ayarna (yellow card) 64'; 78' (o.g.)	Stadium: Pallohalli TN; Attendance: 93; Referee: Kalle Mäkinen

==== Knockout stage ====
16 March 2019 Last 16	Haka	0 – 1	RoPS	Valkeakoski
14:30 EET (UTC+2)	V.Starck (yellow card) 68'	Report	Katz 54'; Sihvonen (yellow card) 72'; Llamas (yellow card) 90+3'	Stadium: Saharan tekonurmi Attendance: 243; Referee: Mattias Gestranius

30 March 2019 Quarterfinal	RoPS	1 – 2	KPV	Rovaniemi
16:00 EET (UTC+2)	Hyvärinen 66'; Taiwo (yellow card) 83'	Report	Mäkelä 13'; Mannström 79'; Josimov (yellow card) 90+2'	Stadium: Rovaniemen Keskuskentta; Attendance: 822; Referee: Ville Nilleinen

=== UEFA Europa League ===
==== Qualifying rounds ====
11 July 2019 First qualifying round 1st leg	Aberdeen (Scotland)	2 – 1	(Finland) RoPS	Aberdeen, Scotland
21:45 EEST (UTC+3)	McGinn 36'; Cosgrove (yellow card) 40' (goal) 48'	Report	Llamas (yellow card) 19'; Katz (yellow card) 25'; Sissoko (yellow card) 73'; Jäntti 90+3'	Stadium: Pittodrie Stadium; Attendance: 14,377; Referee: Kaspar Sjöberg (Sweden)

18 July 2019 First qualifying round 2nd leg	RoPS (Finland)	1 – 2 (2 – 4 agg.)	(Scotland) Aberdeen	Rovaniemi, Finland
19:00 EEST (UTC+3)	Kada 2'; Kokko (yellow card) 30'	Report	Cosgrove 27' (pen.); Campbell (yellow card) 75'; Logan (yellow card) 88'; Ferguson 90+4'	Stadium: Rovaniemen keskuskenttä Attendance: 2,000; Referee: Ümit Öztürk (Turkey)

== Squad statistics ==
As of Match played 19 October 2019

=== Appearances and goals ===
No.	Pos	Nat	Player	Total		Veikkausliiga		Finnish Cup		Europa League	
No.	Pos	Nat	Player	Apps	Goals	Apps	Goals	Apps	Goals	Apps	Goals
2	DF	(Finland) FIN	Henrik Ölander	21	0	5+9	0	7	0	0	0
3	DF	(Nigeria) NGR	Taye Taiwo	31	1	27	1	1+1	0	2	0
4	MF	(Spain) ESP	Jagoba Beobide	10	0	10	0	0	0	0	0
5	DF	(Finland) FIN	Kalle Katz	26	1	16+1	0	7	1	2	0
6	DF	(Finland) FIN	Atte Sihvonen	34	2	24+2	1	6	1	2	0
7	FW	(Finland) FIN	Youness Rahimi	27	5	21+4	5	0	0	1+1	0
8	MF	(Spain) ESP	Sergio Llamas	16	1	8+1	0	6	1	1	0
10	MF	(Finland) FIN	Lucas Lingman	35	3	25+1	3	7	0	2	0
11	FW	(Finland) FIN	Aleksandr Kokko	14	1	7+4	1	0+1	0	2	0
14	MF	(Finland) FIN	Eetu Muinonen	25	2	18+5	2	0	0	2	0
15	DF	(Finland) FIN	Kevin Kouassivi-Benissan	8	0	5+3	0	0	0	0	0
17	FW	(Finland) FIN	Sampo Ala	13	2	3+5	1	1+4	1	0	0
18	FW	(Finland) FIN	Veka Pyyny	2	0	0	0	2	0	0	0
19	MF	(Finland) FIN	Tuomas Kaukua	5	0	3+2	0	0	0	0	0
20	DF	(Finland) FIN	Juho Hyvärinen	33	3	25+1	2	5	1	2	0
21	FW	(Finland) FIN	Matias Tamminen	21	3	8+6	1	7	2	0	0
22	MF	(Finland) FIN	Rasmus Degerman	5	0	0	0	2+3	0	0	0
23	FW	(Finland) FIN	Niklas Jokelainen	27	5	7+13	2	5	3	0+2	0
24	MF	(Finland) FIN	Tommi Jäntti	25	2	8+12	1	1+2	0	0+2	1
25	GK	(Spain) ESP	Antonio Reguero	24	0	22	0	0	0	2	0
26	DF	(Finland) FIN	Eerik Kantola	3	0	0	0	0+3	0	0	0
27	DF	(Nigeria) NGR	Samuel Olabisi	5	0	2	0	2+1	0	0	0
28	MF	(Finland) FIN	Kirill Bullat	1	0	0	0	0+1	0	0	0
29	MF	(Finland) FIN	Santeri Haarala	1	0	0+1	0	0	0	0	0
33	MF	(Brazil) BRA	Agnaldo	24	0	16+3	0	2+2	0	1	0
34	MF	(Netherlands) NED	Tarik Kada	19	0	8+5	0	4	0	1+1	0
35	GK	(Finland) FIN	Juhani Kangas	1	0	0	0	1	0	0	0
88	DF	(France) FRA	Mohamadou Sissoko	30	0	24	0	4	0	2	0
Youth team players:
19	FW	(Finland) FIN	Matias Irvankoski	2	0	0	0	1+1	0	0	0
Players away from the club on loan:
Players who left RoPS during the season:
1	GK	(North Macedonia) MKD	Damjan Shishkovski	11	0	5	0	6	0	0	0

=== Goal scorers ===
Place	Position	Nation	Number	Name	Veikkausliiga	Finnish Cup	Europa League	Total
1	FW	(Finland)	23	Niklas Jokelainen	2	3	0	5
1	FW	(Finland)	7	Youness Rahimi	5	0	0	5
3	FW	(Finland)	21	Matias Tamminen	2	2	0	4
4	MF	(Finland)	10	Lucas Lingman	3	0	0	3
4	DF	(Finland)	6	Atte Sihvonen	2	1	0	3
4	DF	(Finland)	20	Juho Hyvärinen	2	1	0	3
7	MF	(Finland)	14	Eetu Muinonen	2	0	0	2
7	FW	(Finland)	17	Sampo Ala	1	1	0	2
7	MF	(Finland)	24	Tommi Jäntti	1	0	1	2
10	DF	(Finland)	15	Kevin Kouassivi-Benissan	1	0	0	1
10	DF	(Nigeria)	3	Taye Taiwo	1	0	0	1
10	FW	(Finland)	11	Aleksandr Kokko	1	0	0	1
10	MF	(Spain)	8	Sergio Llamas	0	1	0	1
10	DF	(Finland)	5	Kalle Katz	0	1	0	1
10	MF	(Netherlands)	34	Tarik Kada	0	0	1	1
TOTALS					23	10	2	35

=== Disciplinary record ===
Number	Nation	Position	Name	Veikkausliiga		Finnish Cup		Europa League		Total	
Number	Nation	Position	Name	Yellow card	Red card	Yellow card	Red card	Yellow card	Red card	Yellow card	Red card
2	(Finland)	DF	Henrik Ölander	0	0	2	0	0	0	2	0
3	(Nigeria)	DF	Taye Taiwo	0	1	1	0	0	0	1	1
4	(Spain)	MF	Jagoba Beobide	2	0	0	0	0	0	2	0
5	(Finland)	DF	Kalle Katz	3	0	0	0	1	0	4	0
6	(Finland)	DF	Atte Sihvonen	5	0	2	0	0	0	7	0
7	(Finland)	MF	Youness Rahimi	2	0	0	0	0	0	2	0
8	(Spain)	MF	Sergio Llamas	0	0	2	0	1	0	3	0
10	(Finland)	MF	Lucas Lingman	5	0	0	0	0	0	5	0
11	(Finland)	FW	Aleksandr Kokko	1	0	0	0	1	0	2	0
14	(Finland)	MF	Eetu Muinonen	2	0	0	0	0	0	2	0
17	(Finland)	FW	Sampo Ala	1	0	0	0	0	0	1	0
20	(Finland)	DF	Juho Hyvärinen	1	0	0	0	0	0	1	0
21	(Finland)	FW	Matias Tamminen	2	0	1	0	0	0	3	0
23	(Finland)	FW	Niklas Jokelainen	1	0	1	0	0	0	2	0
24	(Finland)	MF	Tommi Jäntti	1	0	0	0	0	0	1	0
27	(Nigeria)	DF	Samuel Olabisi	3	1	1	0	0	0	4	1
33	(Brazil)	MF	Agnaldo	2	0	0	0	0	0	2	0
34	(Netherlands)	MF	Tarik Kada	0	1	0	0	0	0	0	1
88	(France)	DF	Mohamadou Sissoko	8	0	0	0	1	0	9	0
Players away on loan:
Players who left RoPS during the season:
1	(North Macedonia)	GK	Damjan Shishkovski	1	0	1	0	0	0	2	0
TOTALS				49	3	11	0	4	0	64	3
