= 2019–20 Aberdeen F.C. season =

Aberdeen
2019–20 season
- Chairman: Stewart Milne (until 16 Dec); Dave Cormack (from 16 Dec)
- Manager: Derek McInnes
- Ground: Pittodrie Stadium
- Scottish Premiership: 4th
- Scottish Cup: Semi-finals
- Scottish League Cup: Quarter-final
- UEFA Europa League: Third qualifying round
- Top goalscorer: League: Sam Cosgrove (11); All: Sam Cosgrove (23)
- Highest home attendance: League: 16,410 vs Hearts; 4 August 2019; Cup: 15,246 vs Rijeka; Europa League; 15 August 2019
- Lowest home attendance: League:12,325 vs Hamilton Academical; 14 December 2019; Cup: 9,430 vs Kilmarnock; Scottish Cup; 8 February 2020
- Average home league attendance: 13,796
Home colours	Away colours

The 2019–20 Aberdeen F.C. season was Aberdeen's 107th season in the top flight of Scottish football and the seventh in the Scottish Premiership. Aberdeen also competed in the League Cup, the Scottish Cup, and in qualifying for the 2019–20 UEFA Europa League.

On 13 March 2020, the Scottish football season was suspended with immediate effect due to the COVID-19 pandemic. On 18 May 2020, the SPFL declared the end of the season determining on an average points per game with the Dons finishing in fourth place.

== Summary ==
=== June ===
The club at the end of May confirmed youngsters David Craddock, Morgan Brown and Ryan Harrington were released along with Greg Halford, whilst Greg Stewart, Dominic Ball, James Wilson and Max Lowe returned to their parent clubs. Graeme Shinnie and Mark Reynolds signed pre-contracts with Derby County and Dundee United respectively.

On 4 June, Wales International Ryan Hedges signed a three-year deal on a pre-contract joining from Barnsley officially on 1 July, and Ash Taylor signed a two-year deal as he returns to Pittodrie after two years at Northampton Town. The following day, Curtis Main signed a two-year deal joining from Motherwell. On 13 June, Sam Roscoe joined Ayr United. On 17 June, Luc Bollan joined the development squad from Dundee United.

On 18 June, the Europa League First Qualifying Round draw was made and the Dons were drawn to play against Finnish side RoPS. The following day, Craig Bryson signed a two-year deal on a pre-contract and will join on 30 June from Derby County. Also, Michael Ruth joined from Queens Park and with the Dons paying Compensation, he joined up with the development squad. On 21 June, the Premiership fixtures were released with the Dons starting at home to Hearts.

On 22 June, Jon Gallagher joined the club on an initial six-month loan from MLS side Atlanta United. On 24 June, after contacting him in January, Gary Mackay-Steven signed for New York City. On 25 June, Greg Leigh signed a season-long loan from Dutch side NAC Breda with the option of a future deal. Young goalkeeper Archie Mair joined Norwich City with the Dons receiving compensation for the player, and the club signed up Sam Jackson from Dundee who joined the development squad on a one-year deal.

=== July ===
On 3 July, after spending last season on loan, James Wilson signed a two-year deal. He later that day played in a 2–0 friendly win against Peterhead with Sam Cosgrove and Shay Logan scoring the goals. On 5 July, youngster David Dangana joined Stranraer on a season-long loan. On 8 July, after signing a new one-year deal in May, Frank Ross joined Ayr United on loan until January.

Before the first European tie with RoPS Rovaniemi, goalkeeper Joe Lewis was named as the new club captain after the departure of Graeme Shinnie to Derby County. On the day of the match, manager Derek McInnes and assistant head coach Tony Docherty signed a new two-year deal to 2022. The Dons won the first leg 2–1 and despite dominating the match, they conceded a stoppage-time goal, keeping the tie in the balance.

On 14 July, Funso Ojo signed a three-year deal joining from Scunthorpe United for a fee believed to be £125,000. He was originally set to join Hibernian, but manager McInnes convinced him to join Aberdeen. The Dons then played RoPS Rovaniemi in Finland, and in a very nervy match, they won 2–1 to set up a tie with Georgia side Chikhura Sachkhere. Subsequently, the opening match of the season with Hearts was rearranged to 4 August.

=== August ===
After drawing 1–1 in the first leg, the Dons thrashed Chikhura Sachkhere 5–0 at Pittodrie to set up a tie with Rijeka who they met in 2015 and won 5–2 on aggregate. Due to the Dons qualifying for the next round, the League match with St Mirren and the League Cup match with Dundee were pushed back 24 hours to the Sundays. Before the away match with Rijeka, Zak Vyner joined the club on an initial season-long loan from Bristol City. The Dons also resisted a transfer request from defender Scott McKenna and bids for him from Queens Park Rangers and Nottingham Forest and Bristol City. Aberdeen lost the away leg to Rijeka 2–0, with reports Dons fans were treated badly with lead to an investigation by UEFA.

On 14 August, goalkeeper Danny Rogers moved to Greenock Morton on a season-long loan deal. Aberdeen were knocked out of the Europa League with a 2–0 defeat to Rijeka, ending 4–0 on aggregate. It was the sixth year in a row they had failed to get past the third qualifying round. Aberdeen needed extra time to beat Dundee in the League Cup to set up a quarter-final tie away to Hearts.

On 29 August 2019, defender Scott McKenna was ruled out for a month with a hamstring injury sustained in the 0–0 draw against Kilmarnock. Also, Stevie May left the Dons and signed for St Johnstone for a second time. Young defender Miko Virtanen joined Arbroath on a season-long loan.

=== September ===
For the September Internationals, Ryan Hedges was called up for Wales, Michael Devlin for Scotland, with also Lewis Ferguson for Scotland Under 21s respectively. Niall McGinn played for Northern Ireland in a 2–0 defeat to Germany. Connor McLennan came off the bench and scored two goals for Scotland Under 21s against Croatia Under 21s. On 12 September, winger Scott Wright injured his knee in training and "may miss the rest of the season".

After the 1–1 home draw with St Johnstone, Craig Bryson and Funso Ojo were added to the injury list, adding to the clubs "injury crisis". Despite this, the Dons won their next match at Livingston. But a few days later, the Dons were knocked out of the League Cup, missing all 3 penalties against Hearts in the Quarter finals. The Dons ended the month with a "humiliating" 5–0 defeat to Rangers at Ibrox.

=== October ===
For the October Internationals, Michael Devlin was again called up for Scotland whilst also Niall McGinn for Northern Ireland. Aberdeen drew their next game 1–1 at home to Hibernian but had both Curtis Main and Lewis Ferguson sent off for straight red card offences. Devlin played in both games for Scotland against Russia and San Marino. McGinn came on against Czech Republic with his appearance now ranking him in the Top 20 for Northern Ireland. Lewis Ferguson and Connor McLennan both played for Scotland Under 21s against Lithuania. Dean Campbell and Ethan Ross both played for Scotland Under 19s in a 1–0 win against Germany.

The Dons returned to action with a 3–0 win against Motherwell at Fir Park despite criticism from fans for starting 6 defenders. They then suffered a 4–0 home defeat to Celtic with all 4 goals coming in the first half which left McInnes "embarrassed" by the manner of the defeat. To end the month, they bounced back with a 1–0 win away to Hamilton.

On 31 October, Sir Alex Ferguson opened Aberdeen's new training facilities and football academy Cormack Park, saying it was "up there with the best" he has seen. It cost the club £12 million which includes a training pavilion, groundsman's accommodation, three training pitches, two floodlit 3G surfaces and two grass parks, as well as outdoor and indoor space for community-based sporting and recreational activities. McInnes also said Aberdeen finally have a training facility 'to be proud of'.

=== November ===
The Dons began November with a comfortable 3–0 home win against a makeshift Kilmarnock side. Aberdeen then moved up to third in the table with a 3–1 win at Ross County. During the International break, chairman Stewart Milne announced he would be stepping down, to be replaced by Dave Cormack. The club also announced a "strategic partnership" with Major League Soccer side Atlanta United FC.

Andrew Considine joined the 500-club at Aberdeen after captaining the side in a feisty 1–1 draw at St Johnstone, where the home side ended the match with nine men. Shortly after the match, Aberdeen were drawn against Dumbarton in the Scottish Cup. They ended the month with a 2–1 win against St Mirren with Joe Lewis saving a late penalty.

=== December ===
Aberdeen came from 2 goals down in their next match to earn a 2–2 home draw against Rangers. They then slumped to a 3–0 defeat to Hibernian at Easter Road with McInnes saying they had "gifted" them the goals. On 13 December, midfielder Dean Campbell signed an extended contract until 2023. The following day, a Cosgrove goal was enough to beat Hamilton Accies. On 16 December, Dave Cormack officially took over as chairman from Stewart Milne.

Cosgrove scored his twentieth goal of the season and was harshly sent off in their next match at Celtic Park with the Dons losing 2–1. Manager McInnes claimed Celtic defender Kristoffer Ajer "laughed and winked" at Cosgrove as he was sent off, saying they would "100% appeal the decision". They were dealt with "a real blow" after the match as Greg Leigh and Craig Bryson were officially ruled out for two months with separate injuries. They also lost the appeal for Cosgrove's red card and he was suspended for two matches.

Aberdeen ended the year with a 2–1 home win against Livingston, which followed with a hard-fought 1–1 away draw at Tynecastle against bottom of the table, ten-man Hearts. Defender Zak Vyner injured his shoulder and was later recalled from his loan spell by his parent club.

=== January ===
On 3 January, Under 18s captain Ethan Ross joined Dunfermline Athletic on loan until the end of the season. On 7 January, Dylan McGeouch signed from English club Sunderland on a permanent deal until 2022. On 9 January, Jon Gallagher extended his loan deal until the end of the season. During their training camp in Dubai, the Dons lost a friendly to Jordanian side Al-Wehdat.

On 18 January, the Dons scraped past Dumbarton with a late Cosgrove penalty to make the fifth round of the Scottish Cup. On 21 January, Mark Gallagher joined from Ross County for a nominal fee. He joined with the development squad. After initially signing a pre-contract on 15 January, Matty Kennedy joined permanently on 24 January from St Johnstone on a fee believed to be £70,000. Aberdeen were then booed off away to St Mirren in a 0–0 draw with fans voicing their anger towards the manager.

On transfer deadline day, defender Zak Vyner returned to his parent club Bristol City six months early after being ruled out with a shoulder injury and forward James Wilson was allowed to leave on a free to Salford City. Aberdeen signed Venezuelan international Ronald Hernández on a four-and-a-half-year deal from Norwegian club Stabæk. He became the club's first ever Venezuelan player when he made his debut. Irish midfielder Stephen Gleeson had his contract cancelled after struggling with knee injuries.

=== February ===
The Dons began February by putting in a superb defensive display against Rangers at Ibrox ending an eight-game home winning streak for them with a 0–0 draw. However, the goalless run continued with a home defeat to St Johnstone and another 0–0 draw in the Scottish Cup against Kilmarnock, making it their longest run without a goal since 1973. The run ended in the next match at Hamilton Accies with a 3–1 win and all goals coming from open play. Even with a "battling" performance in the following match, they lost at home to Celtic, their eighth consecutive home defeat to the Champions.

On 19 February, the team showed "sheer guts and tenacity" in their Scottish Cup fifth round replay against Kilmarnock after coming from behind twice to win in extra time. The win set them up with a tie away to St Mirren in the quarter-finals with a Saturday evening kick off of 7:20pm. They continued their 2020 win-less league home run against Ross County, partly due to Dean Campbell being sent off after half-an-hour due to two bookable offences when leading the match 1–0. They ended the month by defeating St Mirren in the Scottish Cup with goals from Lewis Ferguson and a late penalty from Sam Cosgrove to face Celtic in the semi-finals on 12 April. Unfortunately however, defender Scott McKenna was likely to be ruled out until the end of the season with a torn hamstring.

=== March ===
On 4 March, they came back from two goals down to earn a draw at Kilmarnock to preserve the eight-year unbeaten record there but slipped further behind Motherwell in the table. The Dons then ended their win-less home run by beating Hibernian with the away side finishing with ten men.

Due to the COVID-19 pandemic, all games were suspended until further notice. with all club activities shut down until at least 22 March. This led to manager McInnes telling the players to "stay in their own houses" and "to avoid gyms, cinemas, concerts and restaurants". Chairman Dave Cormack released a statement stating the club would lose "£5million in outgoings with no expected income until perhaps July."

=== April ===
Chairman Dave Cormack's investment group pledged £2Million and confirmed players and staff were deferred between 10% and 30% in wages for four months. McInnes said it would be "common sense" to crown Celtic champions if the season could not be completed due to the virus. On 9 April, the Scottish football season was further suspended until at least 10 June.

=== May ===
On 6 May, Under 18s captain Connor Barron signed a new two-year contract. On 18 May, following on from the season being brought to an end by the SPFL, chairman Dave Cormack said the club faced the "daunting prospect" of a further £1Million in losses.

=== June 2020 ===
On 11 June, Lewis Ferguson was named as the SFWA Young Player of the Year by the Football Writers' Association. On 13 June, Andrew Considine was named club Player of the Year for a third time and he also won the Players' Player of the Year. Lewis Ferguson won the Goal of the Season award for his strike against St Mirren, Dean Campbell won Young Player of the Year and Michael Ruth won Development Player of the Year.

=== September 2020 ===
The Semi-final Scottish Cup tie with Celtic was rearranged for 1 November, with the match live on Premier Sports. The Dons were beaten 2–0.

== Results & fixtures ==
Win Draw Loss Postponed

=== Pre-season ===
29 June 2018 Friendly	Connah's Quay Nomads	0–0	Aberdeen	Fota Island Resort, Cork, Ireland
14:00 BST		AFC Report; Nomads Report		Attendance: ~100 (70 Dons fans); Referee: Anthony Buttimer

3 July 2019 Friendly	Peterhead	0–2	Aberdeen	Balmoor Stadium
19:45 BST		AFC Report	Cosgrove 35'; Logan 70'	Attendance: 2,042; Referee: Graham Beaton

6 July 2019 Friendly	Inverness Caledonian Thistle	1–1	Aberdeen	Borough Briggs
15:00 BST	McKay 70'	AFC Report	Main 62' (pen.)	Attendance: 2,149; Referee: Alan Muir

=== Scottish Premiership ===
4 August 2019 1	Aberdeen	3–2	Heart of Midlothian	Pittodrie Stadium
15:00 BST	Cosgrove 13', 80'; Hedges 85'	Report	Naismith 68'; Walker 76'	Attendance: 16,410; Referee: Don Robertson

11 August 2019 2	St Mirren	1–0	Aberdeen	The Simple Digital Arena
15:00 BST	Durmus 13'; Mullen (yellow card) 89'	Report	Vyner (yellow card) 61'; Ojo (yellow card) 78'	Attendance: 6,199; Referee: Steven McLean

24 August 2019 3	Kilmarnock	0–0	Aberdeen	Rugby Park
15:00 BST	El Makrini (yellow card) 29'; Burke (yellow card) 61'; Bruce (yellow card) 89'	Report	Ferguson (yellow card) 61'	Attendance: 5,250; Referee: Alan Muir

31 August 2019 4	Aberdeen	3–0	Ross County	Pittodrie Stadium
15:00 BST	Leigh 34'; Cosgrove 37' (pen.); Hedges 50'; Ojo (yellow card) 51'; Considine (yellow card) 73'	Report	Stewart (yellow card) 27'	Attendance: 13,006; Referee: Nick Walsh

14 September 2019 5	Aberdeen	1–1	St Johnstone	Pittodrie Stadium
15:00 BST	Hedges 28'	Report	O'Halloran 43'; Gordon (yellow card) 52'; Ralston (yellow card) 77'	Attendance: 13,272; Referee: Steven McLean

21 September 2019 6	Livingston	0–2	Aberdeen	Almondvale Stadium
15:00 BST	Jacobs (yellow card) 52'; Devlin (yellow card) 90+2'	Report	Considine 29'; Cosgrove 90+3' (pen.)	Attendance: 2,803; Referee: Nick Walsh

28 September 2019 7	Rangers	5–0	Aberdeen	Ibrox Stadium
15:00 BST	Tavernier 20' (pen.), 71' (pen.); Stewart 40'; Morelos 50'; Defoe 80'	Report	McGinn (yellow card) 30'; Cosgrove (yellow card) 82'; Devlin (yellow card) 86'	Attendance: 49,992; Referee: Bobby Madden

5 October 2019 8	Aberdeen	1–1	Hibernian	Pittodrie Stadium
15:00 BST	Cosgrove (yellow card) 40' (goal) 86'; Main (red card) 55'; Ferguson (red card) 90+4'	Report	Hallberg (yellow card) 40'; Porteous 48'	Attendance: 13,880; Referee: Don Robertson

19 October 2019 9	Motherwell	0–3	Aberdeen	Fir Park
15:00 BST	Grimshaw (yellow card) 90+3'	Report	Cosgrove 15'; McGinn 53'; Vyner 60' (yellow card) 72'; McKenna (yellow card) 90+3'	Attendance: 5,640; Referee: Euan Anderson

27 October 2019 10	Aberdeen	0–4	Celtic	Pittodrie Stadium
12:15 BST	Considine (yellow card) 28'	Report	Édouard 10'; Frimpong 15'; Forrest 37'; Elyounoussi 45'	Attendance: 15,079; Referee: John Beaton
Note: Game televised on BT Sport

30 October 2019 11	Hamilton Academical	0–1	Aberdeen	Fountain of Youth Stadium
19:45 GMT	Cunningham (yellow card) 62'	Report	Ferguson 14'; Campbell (yellow card) 52'	Attendance: 1,687; Referee: Willie Collum

2 November 2019 12	Aberdeen	3–0	Kilmarnock	Pittodrie Stadium
15:00 GMT	Main 10'; Cosgrove 27'; Devlin (yellow card) 56'; Vyner (yellow card) 60'; McKenna 81'	Report	Dicker (yellow card) 76'	Attendance: 13,131; Referee: Kevin Clancy

9 November 2019 13	Ross County	1–3	Aberdeen	Global Energy Stadium
15:00 GMT	Mullin 5' (pen.); Morris (yellow card) 22'; Fontaine (yellow card) 84'	Report	McGinn 10'; Hedges 52'; Ferguson (yellow card) 64'; Considine 70'	Attendance: 6,510; Referee: Alan Newlands

24 November 2019 14	St Johnstone	1–1	Aberdeen	McDiarmid Park
15:00	Holt (yellow card) 43'; Duffy (yellow card) 45'; Kennedy 71'; Davidson (red card) 74'; Hendry (red card) 78'; Wotherspoon (yellow card) 90'	Report	Cosgrove 21'; Logan (yellow card) 39'; Bryson (yellow card) 76'	Attendance: 3,917; Referee: Kevin Clancy
Note: Game televised on Sky Sports Football

30 November 2019 15	Aberdeen	2–1	St Mirren	Pittodrie Stadium
15:00 GMT	Cosgrove 6'; McGinn 56'; Lewis (yellow card) 83'	Report	Obika 23'	Attendance: 12,829; Referee: Steven McLean

4 December 2019 16	Aberdeen	2–2	Rangers	Pittodrie Stadium
19:45 GMT	Logan (yellow card) 13'; Cosgrove (yellow card) 33'; Gallagher 39'; Considine 48'	Report	Arfield 18', (yellow card) 83'; Jack 30'; Goldson (yellow card) 66'	Attendance: 14,790; Referee: John Beaton
Note: Game televised on Sky Sports Football

7 December 2019 17	Hibernian	3–0	Aberdeen	Easter Road
15:00 GMT	Boyle 52', 68'; Kamberi 74'	Report	Hedges (yellow card) 43'; Ferguson (yellow card) 70'	Attendance: 16,767; Referee: Colin Steven

14 December 2019 18	Aberdeen	1–0	Hamilton Academical	Pittodrie Stadium
15:00 GMT	Cosgrove 53'	Report	Stubbs (yellow card) 85'	Attendance: 12,325; Referee: William Collum

21 December 2019 19	Celtic	2–1	Aberdeen	Celtic Park
15:00 GMT	Jullien 7'; Christie (yellow card) 39'; Édouard 66'; Frimpong (yellow card) 90'	Report	Cosgrove 35' (red card) 69'; Considine (yellow card) 90+4'	Attendance: 59,131; Referee: Euan Anderson

26 December 2019 20	Aberdeen	2–1	Livingston	Pittodrie Stadium
15:00 GMT	McLennan 13'; Taylor (yellow card) 85'; Bruce Anderson 81'	Report	Dykes 86'	Attendance: 14,518; Referee: Bobby Madden

29 December 2019 21	Heart of Midlothian	1–1	Aberdeen	Tynecastle Park
14:00 GMT	Meshino (yellow card) 30' (goal) 49'; Clare (red card) 68'; Dikamona (yellow card) 89'	Report	Ferguson (yellow card) 31'; Ojo (yellow card) 55'; Taylor (yellow card) 65'; McGinn 68'	Attendance: 17,788; Referee: Alan Muir

22 January 2020 22	Aberdeen	0–1	Motherwell	Pittodrie Stadium
19:45 GMT	Cosgrove (yellow card) 75'	Report	Long (yellow card) 21'; Donnelly (yellow card) 37' (goal) 45+1'; Carroll (yellow card) 71'	Attendance: 12,365; Referee: Willie Collum

26 January 2020 23	St Mirren	0–0	Aberdeen	The Simple Digital Arena
12:30 GMT	MacPherson (yellow card) 25'	Report		Attendance: 5,302; Referee: Don Robertson
Note: Game televised on Sky Sports Football

1 February 2020 24	Rangers	0–0	Aberdeen	Ibrox Stadium
15:00 GMT	Barišić (yellow card) 16'; Goldson (yellow card) 61'; Arfield (yellow card) 68'	Report	Ferguson (yellow card) 26'; McGeouch (yellow card) 56'; McKenna (yellow card) 72'; Lewis (yellow card) 76'	Attendance: 50,012; Referee: Andrew Dallas

5 February 2020 25	Aberdeen	0–1	St Johnstone	Pittodrie Stadium
19:45 GMT	McGeouch (yellow card) 62'; Ferguson (yellow card) 90+3'	Report	McCann 6' (yellow card) 76'; Ralston (yellow card) 60'	Attendance: 12,552; Referee: Kevin Clancy

11 February 2020 26	Hamilton Academical	1–3	Aberdeen	Fountain of Youth Stadium
19:45 GMT	Ogkmpoe 84'	Report	Main 15'; McGinn 23'; McLennan 45+4'; Considine (yellow card) 51'	Attendance: 1,218; Referee: Greg Aitken
Note: Game televised on Sky Sports Football

16 February 2020 27	Aberdeen	1–2	Celtic	Pittodrie Stadium
12:00 GMT	Taylor 27' (yellow card) 45+1'; McLennan (yellow card) 39'	Report	McGregor 10'; Griffiths (yellow card) 45'; Ajer 81'; Bitton (yellow card) 86'	Attendance: 14,135; Referee: Andrew Dallas
Note: Game televised on Sky Sports Football

22 February 2020 28	Aberdeen	1–2	Ross County	Pittodrie Stadium
15:00 GMT	Main 28'; Campbell (yellow card) 18' (yellow-red card) 32'	Report	Morris (yellow card) 21'; Mckay 43', 88'	Attendance: 14,860; Referee: Gavin Duncan

4 March 2020 29	Kilmarnock	2–2	Aberdeen	Rugby Park
19:45 GMT	Brophy 17' (pen.); Kiltie 23'	Report	McGinn 38'; McLennan 50'	Attendance: 4,217; Referee: Alan Newlands

7 March 2020 30	Aberdeen	3–1	Hibernian	Pittodrie Stadium
15:00 GMT	Jackson 64' (o.g.); Considine 66'; Main 82'	Report	Doidge 39'; Whittaker (yellow card) 40' (yellow-red card) 55'; Hallberg (yellow card) 65'; McGinn (yellow card) 87'	Attendance: 14,388; Referee: John Beaton

13 March 2020 31 (Note: Match cancelled due to the COVID-19 pandemic)	Motherwell	Cancelled	Aberdeen	Fir Park
19:45 GMT

21 March 2020 32	Livingston	Cancelled	Aberdeen	Almondvale Stadium
15:00 GMT

3 April 2020 33	Aberdeen	Cancelled	Heart of Midlothian	Pittodrie Stadium
19:45 BST

=== UEFA Europa League ===
Aberdeen qualified for the First qualifying round after finishing in fourth place in the 2018–19 Scottish Premiership.

==== Qualifying phase ====
11 July 2019 1st Leg	Aberdeen (Scotland)	2–1	(Finland) RoPS Rovaniemi	Aberdeen, Scotland
19:45 BST	McGinn 36'; Cosgrove (yellow card) 40' (goal) 48'	BBC Report; UEFA Report; AFC Report	Llamas (yellow card) 19'; Katz (yellow card) 25'; Sissoko (yellow card) 73'; Jäntti 90+3'	Stadium: Pittodrie Stadium; Attendance: 14,377; Referee: Kaspar Sjöberg (Sweden)

18 July 2019 2nd Leg	RoPS Rovaniemi (Finland)	1–2 (2–4 agg.)	(Scotland) Aberdeen	Rovaniemi, Finland
19:00 EEST (17:00 BST)	Kada 2'; Kokko (yellow card) 30'	BBC Report; UEFA Report; AFC Report	Cosgrove 26' (pen.); Campbell (yellow card) 75'; Logan (yellow card) 88'; Ferguson 90+4'	Stadium: Rovaniemen keskuskenttä Attendance: 1,992; Referee: Umit Ozturk (Turkey)
Note: Game televised on Premier Sports

25 July 2019 1st Leg	Chikhura Sachkhere (Georgia (country))	1–1	(Scotland) Aberdeen	Tbilisi, Georgia
20:45 GET (17:45 BST)	Lekvtadze (yellow card) 9'; Ergemlidze (yellow card) 21'; Koripadze 41' (pen.); Maisashvili (yellow card) 67'	BBC Report; UEFA Report; AFC Report	Taylor (yellow card) 14'; Ojo (yellow card) 22'; Cosgrove 68' (pen.)	Stadium: Boris Paichadze Dinamo Arena (Note: Chikhura Sachkhere play their home matches at Boris Paichadze Dinamo Arena, Tbilisi, instead of their regular stadium Central Stadium, Sachkhere which did not meet UEFA requirements.); Attendance: 3,218; Referee: Horatiu Fesnic (Romania)
Note: Game televised on Premier Sports

1 August 2019 2nd Leg	Aberdeen (Scotland)	5–0 (6–1 agg.)	(Georgia (country)) Chikhura Sachkhere	Aberdeen, Scotland
19:45 BST	Cosgrove 9' 20' 80'; Leigh 58'; Wright 64'	BBC Report; UEFA Report; AFC Report	Maisashvili (yellow card) 26'; Mamasakhlisi (yellow card) 48'	Stadium: Pittodrie Stadium; Attendance: 15,167; Referee: Rade Obrenović (Slovenia)

8 August 2019 1st Leg	Rijeka (Croatia)	2–0	(Scotland) Aberdeen	Rijeka, Croatia
20:00 CEST (19:00 BST)	Čolak 62' (pen.); Murić 87'	BBC Report; AFC Report; UEFA Report		Stadium: Stadion Rujevica; Attendance: 6,452; Referee: Ricardo de Burgos Bengoetxea (Spain)
Note: Game televised on Premier Sports

15 August 2019 2nd Leg	Aberdeen (Scotland)	0–2 (0–4 agg.)	(Croatia) Rijeka	Aberdeen, Scotland
19:45 BST		BBC Report; AFC Report; UEFA Report	Lončar 10'; Čolak 32'	Stadium: Pittodrie Stadium; Attendance: 15,246; Referee: Harald Lechner (Austria)

=== Scottish Cup ===
18 January 2020 Fourth round	Aberdeen	1–0	Dumbarton	Pittodrie Stadium
15:00 GMT	Cosgrove 86' (pen.)	Report	Brennan (yellow card) 87'	Attendance: 10,010; Referee: Gavin Duncan

8 February 2020 Fifth round	Aberdeen	0–0	Kilmarnock	Pittodrie Stadium
15:01 GMT	Campbell (yellow card) 41'	Report	Broadfoot (yellow card) 30'; Power (yellow card) 81'; McKenzie (yellow card) 90'	Attendance: 9,430; Referee: Nick Walsh

19 February 2020 Fifth round replay	Kilmarnock	3–4 (a.e.t.)	Aberdeen	Rugby Park
19:45 GMT	El Makrini 43'; Burke (yellow card) 64'; Brophy 98'; Kabamba 116'	Report	Considine (yellow card) 81' (goal) 88'; Kennedy 91'; Cosgrove 119' (pen.); Johnson 120+1' (o.g.)	Attendance: 5,658; Referee: Nick Walsh

29 February 2020 Quarter-final	St Mirren	0–2	Aberdeen	The Simple Digital Arena
19:20 GMT			Ferguson 7'; Cosgrove 90' (pen.)	Attendance: 4,479; Referee: Don Robertson
Note: Game televised on BBC Scotland

12 April 2020 Semi-final (Note: Match postponed due to the COVID-19 pandemic)	Celtic	P–P	Aberdeen	Hampden Park
15:00 GMT

1 November 2020 Semi-final	Celtic	2–0	Aberdeen	Hampden Park
14:30 GMT	Christie 18'; Elyounoussi 23'	Report		Attendance: 0 Referee: Don Robertson
Note: Live on Premier Sports

=== Scottish League Cup ===
18 August 2019 Second round	Dundee	1–2 (a.e.t.)	Aberdeen	Dens Park
15:00 BST	Johnson 43' (pen.)	BBC Report	Considine 90+1'; Cosgrove 103'	Attendance: 5,740; Referee: William Collum

25 September 2019 Quarter-final	Hearts	2–2 (3–0 p)	Aberdeen	Tynecastle Stadium
19:45 BST	MacLean 22'; Halkett 90'	Report	Cosgrove 12' (pen.), 31' (pen.)	Attendance: 12,866; Referee: Kevin Clancy
	Penalties
	Whelan (penalty scored); Smith (penalty scored); Keena (penalty scored)		(penalty missed) Cosgrove; (penalty missed) McGinn; (penalty missed) Anderson

=== Scottish Challenge Cup ===
6 August 2019 Round 1	Brora Rangers	6–0	Aberdeen Colts	Dudgeon Park
19:45	Nicolson 11'; Davidson 46'; Wagenaar 64'; Gillespie 71'; Macleod 75'; Williamson 90+1'	Report		Attendance: 150; Referee: Harry Bruce

== Squad statistics ==
=== Appearances ===
No.	Pos	Player	Premiership		Europa League		League Cup		Scottish Cup		Total	
No.	Pos	Player	Apps	Goals	Apps	Goals	Apps	Goals	Apps	Goals	Apps	Goals
1	GK	(England) Joe Lewis (c) (Note: Includes one starting appearance in the delayed Scottish Cup semi-final, recorded under the 2020–21 season by some resources.)	30	0	6	0	2	0	5	0	43	0
2	DF	(England) Shay Logan	23+3	0	6	0	2	0	3+1	0	38	0
3	DF	(England) Greg Leigh (Note: Includes one substitute appearance in the delayed Scottish Cup semi-final, recorded under the 2020–21 season by some resources.)	18	1	3	1	2	0	0+1	0	24	2
4	DF	(Scotland) Andrew Considine	25+2	4	6	0	2	1	5	1	40	6
5	DF	(Scotland) Scott McKenna	24	1	6	0	1	0	4	0	35	1
6	DF	(Scotland) Michael Devlin	11+3	0	1	0	1	0	1+2	0	19	0
7	MF	(Scotland) Craig Bryson	5+3	0	0+1	0	1	0	1+1	0	12	0
8	DF	(Venezuela) Ronald Hernández	1+1	0	0	0	0	0	0	0	2	0
9	FW	(England) Curtis Main	12+6	4	0+3	0	0	0	2+2	0	25	4
10	MF	(Northern Ireland) Niall McGinn	22+6	6	6	1	1+1	0	4+1	0	41	7
11	MF	(Wales) Ryan Hedges	14+8	4	6	0	2	0	1+1	0	32	4
14	DF	(Wales) Ash Taylor	14	1	2	0	0	0	4	0	20	1
15	FW	(Scotland) Scott Wright	2+1	0	1+3	1	0	0	1	0	8	1
16	FW	(England) Sam Cosgrove	22+3	11	6	6	2	3	3+2	3	38	23
17	MF	(Scotland) Dylan McGeouch	6+1	0	0	0	0	0	2	0	9	0
18	FW	(Scotland) Connor McLennan	9+9	3	0+1	0	1+1	0	2+2	0	25	3
19	MF	(Scotland) Lewis Ferguson	28	1	5	1	1	0	4	1	38	3
20	GK	(Czech Republic) Tomáš Černý	0	0	0	0	0	0	0	0	0	0
21	MF	(Republic of Ireland) Jon Gallagher	11+11	1	6	0	1+1	0	0+1	0	31	1
22	MF	(Belgium) Funso Ojo	16	0	4	0	1	0	3	0	24	0
23	FW	(Northern Ireland) Matty Kennedy	7+1	0	0	0	0	0	4	1	12	1
24	MF	(Scotland) Dean Campbell	6+9	0	1+4	0	1+1	0	2+2	0	26	0
25	FW	(Scotland) Bruce Anderson	1+10	1	0+1	0	0+1	0	1+1	0	15	1
27	MF	(Scotland) Seb Ross	0	0	0	0	0	0	0	0	0	0
32	DF	(Scotland) Jack MacKenzie	0	0	0	0	0	0	0	0	0	0
42	MF	(Scotland) Connor Barron	0	0	0	0	0	0	0	0	0	0
44	DF	(Scotland) Calvin Ramsay	0	0	0	0	0	0	0	0	0	0
Players who left the club during the season
8	MF	(Republic of Ireland) Stephen Gleeson	0+1	0	0	0	0	0	0	0	1	0
17	FW	(Scotland) Stevie May	0	0	0	0	0	0	0	0	0	0
23	MF	(Scotland) Ethan Ross	1+1	0	0	0	0	0	0	0	2	0
26	DF	(Finland) Miko Virtanen	0	0	0	0	0	0	0	0	0	0
28 (Note: James Wilson used the No. 28 in the Premiership and No. 8 in Europa League.)	FW	(England) James Wilson	7+4	0	0+3	0	1+1	0	0	0	16	0
33	DF	(England) Zak Vyner	15+1	1	0	0	0+2	0	0	0	18	1
Players signed during the 2020–21 season (Note: Due to the postponement of the 2019–20 Scottish Cup, players signed in the following season were eligible to participate from the semi-final stage.)
3	DF	(Republic of Ireland) Tommie Hoban	0	0	0	0	0	0	1	0	1	0
32	FW	(England) Ryan Edmondson	0	0	0	0	0	0	0	0	0	0
40	MF	(Scotland) Ross McCrorie	0	0	0	0	0	0	1	0	1	0
43	GK	(England) Gary Woods	0	0	0	0	0	0	0	0	0	0
50	FW	(Wales) Marley Watkins	0	0	0	0	0	0	1	0	1	0

=== Goalscorers ===
Ranking	Nation	Number	Name	Scottish Premiership	Europa League	League Cup	Scottish Cup	Total
1	(England)	16	Sam Cosgrove	11	6	3	3	23
2	(Northern Ireland)	10	Niall McGinn	6	1	0	0	7
3	(Scotland)	4	Andrew Considine	4	0	1	1	6
4	(England)	9	Curtis Main	4	0	0	0	4
4	(Wales)	11	Ryan Hedges	4	0	0	0	4
6	(Scotland)	18	Connor McLennan	3	0	0	0	3
6	(Scotland)	19	Lewis Ferguson	1	1	0	1	3
8	(England)	3	Greg Leigh	1	1	0	0	2
9	(Scotland)	5	Scott McKenna	1	0	0	0	1
9	(Wales)	14	Ash Taylor	1	0	0	0	1
9	(Scotland)	15	Scott Wright	0	1	0	0	1
9	(Republic of Ireland)	21	Jon Gallagher	1	0	0	0	1
9	(Northern Ireland)	23	Matty Kennedy	0	0	0	1	1
9	(Scotland)	25	Bruce Anderson	1	0	0	0	1
9	(England)	33	Zak Vyner	1	0	0	0	1
9			Own goals	1	0	0	1	2
TOTALS				40	10	4	7	61

=== Disciplinary record ===
Number	Nation	Position	Name	Premiership		Europa League		League Cup		Scottish Cup		Total	
Number	Nation	Position	Name	Yellow card	Red card	Yellow card	Red card	Yellow card	Red card	Yellow card	Red card	Yellow card	Red card
1	(England)	GK	Joe Lewis	2	0	1	0	0	0	0	0	3	0
2	(England)	DF	Shay Logan	4	0	2	0	2	0	1	0	9	0
4	(Scotland)	DF	Andrew Considine	4	0	0	0	1	0	1	0	6	0
5	(Scotland)	DF	Scott McKenna	2	0	0	0	0	0	0	0	2	0
6	(Scotland)	DF	Michael Devlin	2	0	0	0	0	0	0	0	2	0
7	(Scotland)	MF	Craig Bryson	1	0	0	0	1	0	0	0	2	0
9	(Scotland)	FW	Curtis Main	0	1	1	0	0	0	0	0	1	1
10	(Northern Ireland)	MF	Niall McGinn	1	0	0	0	0	0	0	0	1	0
11	(Wales)	DF	Ryan Hedges	2	0	0	0	1	0	0	0	3	0
14	(Wales)	DF	Ash Taylor	4	0	1	0	0	0	0	0	5	0
16	(England)	FW	Sam Cosgrove	4	1	3	0	1	0	1	0	9	1
17	(Scotland)	MF	Dylan McGeouch	2	0	0	0	0	0	0	0	2	0
18	(Scotland)	MF	Connor McLennan	2	0	0	0	0	0	0	0	2	0
19	(Scotland)	MF	Lewis Ferguson	8	1	0	0	0	0	1 (Note: Includes one yellow card in the delayed Scottish Cup semi-final, recorded under the 2020–21 season by some resources.)	0	9	1
22	(Belgium)	MF	Funso Ojo	4	0	1	1	0	0	0	0	5	1
23	(Northern Ireland)	FW	Matty Kennedy	1	0	0	0	0	0	0	0	1	0
24	(Scotland)	MF	Dean Campbell	1	1	2	0	0	0	1	0	4	1
33	(England)	DF	Zak Vyner	3	0	0	0	0	0	0	0	3	0
			TOTALS	44	4	11	1	6	0	5	0	66	5

== Team statistics ==
=== League table ===
Pos	Team	Pld	W	D	L	GF	GA	GD	Pts	PPG	Qualification or relegation (Note: All play-off matches were cancelled, as clubs voted to curtail the season due to the COVID-19 pandemic.)
2	Rangers	29	21	4	4	64	19	+45	67	2.31	Qualification for the Europa League second qualifying round (Note: Since the 2019–20 Scottish Cup was postponed and could not be completed by the UEFA registration deadline of 3 August 2020, the spot awarded to the Scottish Cup winners (Europa League second qualifying round) was passed to the second-placed team, while the fourth-placed team also qualified for European competition.)
3	Motherwell	30	14	4	12	41	38	+3	46	1.53	Qualification for the Europa League first qualifying round
4	Aberdeen	30	12	9	9	40	36	+4	45	1.50	Qualification for the Europa League first qualifying round
5	Livingston	30	10	9	11	41	39	+2	39	1.30	
6	St Johnstone	29	8	12	9	28	46	−18	36	1.24	

Source: BBC SPFL
Rules for classification: 1) Points per game; 2) Goal difference; 3) Goals scored; 4) Head-to-head points; 5) Head-to-Head goal difference; 6) Play-off (only if deciding champion, UEFA competitions qualification, second stage group allocation or relegation).

=== Results by round ===
Round	1	2	3	4	5	6	7	8	9	10	11	12	13	14	15	16	17	18	19	20	21	22	23	24	25	26	27	28	29	30
Ground	H	A	A	H	H	A	A	H	A	H	A	H	A	A	H	H	A	H	H	H	A	H	A	A	H	A	H	H	A	H
Result	W	L	D	W	D	W	L	D	W	L	W	W	W	D	W	D	L	W	L	W	D	L	D	D	L	W	L	L	D	W
Position	3	4	5	4	4	3	4	4	4	5	4	4	3	3	3	3	4	3	4	4	4	4	4	4	4	3	3	4	4	4

A = Away; H = Home; W = Win; D = Draw; L = Loss

== Transfers ==
=== Players in ===
Dates	Pos	Nat	Player	From	Fee
4 June 2019	DF	(Wales)	Ash Taylor	(England) Northampton Town	Free
5 June 2019	FW	(England)	Curtis Main	(Scotland) Motherwell	Free
17 June 2019	DF	(Scotland)	Luc Bollan	(Scotland) Dundee United	Free
19 June 2019	FW	(Scotland)	Michael Ruth	(Scotland) Queen's Park	Compensation
25 June 2019	GK	(Scotland)	Sam Jackson	(Scotland) Dundee	Free
30 June 2019	MF	(Scotland)	Craig Bryson	(England) Derby County	Free
1 July 2019	MF	(Wales)	Ryan Hedges	(England) Barnsley	Free
3 July 2019	FW	(England)	James Wilson	(England) Manchester United	Free
14 July 2019	MF	(Belgium)	Funso Ojo	(England) Scunthorpe United	£125,000
7 January 2020	MF	(Scotland)	Dylan McGeouch	(England) Sunderland	Free
21 January 2020	MF	(Scotland)	Mark Gallagher	(Scotland) Ross County	Undisclosed
24 January 2020	MF	(Northern Ireland)	Matty Kennedy	(Scotland) St Johnstone	£70,000
31 January 2020	DF	(Venezuela)	Ronald Hernández	(Norway) Stabæk	Undisclosed

=== Players out ===
Dates	Pos	Nat	Player	To	Fee
27 May 2019	DF	(England)	Greg Halford		Released
27 May 2019	GK	(Republic of Ireland)	David Craddock		Released
27 May 2019	FW	(England)	Morgan Brown		Released
13 June 2019	DF	(Scotland)	Sam Roscoe	(Scotland) Ayr United	Free
24 June 2019	MF	(Scotland)	Gary Mackay-Steven	(United States) New York City	Free
25 June 2019	GK	(Scotland)	Archie Mair	(England) Norwich City	Compensation
1 July 2019	MF	(Scotland)	Graeme Shinnie	(England) Derby County	Free
1 July 2019	DF	(Scotland)	Mark Reynolds	(Scotland) Dundee United	Free
8 July 2019	DF	(Wales)	Ryan Harrington	(Wales) The New Saints	Free
29 August 2019	FW	(Scotland)	Stevie May	(Scotland) St Johnstone	Free
31 January 2020	FW	(England)	James Wilson	(England) Salford City	Free
31 January 2020	MF	(Republic of Ireland)	Stephen Gleeson	(England) Solihull Moors	Free

=== Loans in ===
Date	Pos	Nat	Name	From	Fee
22 June 2019	MF	(Republic of Ireland)	Jon Gallagher	(United States) Atlanta United	Season Loan (Note: Gallagher's loan was initially until January but was then extended until the end of the season)
25 June 2019	DF	(England)	Greg Leigh	(Netherlands) NAC Breda	Season Loan
8 August 2019	DF	(England)	Zak Vyner	(England) Bristol City	Six-month Loan

=== Loans out ===
Date	Pos	Nat	Name	To	Fee
5 July 2019	FW	(Nigeria)	David Dangana	(Scotland) Stranraer	Season Loan
8 July 2019	MF	(Scotland)	Frank Ross	(Scotland) Ayr United	Six-month Loan
24 July 2019	DF	(Scotland)	Chris Antoniazzi	(Scotland) Cove Rangers	Six-month Loan
14 August 2019	GK	(Republic of Ireland)	Danny Rogers	(Scotland) Greenock Morton	Season Loan
3 January 2020	MF	(Scotland)	Ethan Ross	(Scotland) Dunfermline Athletic	Six-month Loan
18 February 2020	DF	(Scotland)	Luc Bollan	(Scotland) Peterhead	End of Season Loan

== See also ==
- List of Aberdeen F.C. seasons
