= Sampo (disambiguation) =

The Sampo is a magical artifact in Finnish and Karelian mythology.

Sampo may refer to:

- Sampo (personal name)

== Companies ==
- Sampo Bank, a Finnish banking company
- Sampo Corporation, a Taiwanese manufacturer of electronic and home appliance products
- Sampo Group, a Finnish insurance company
- Sampo, a trademark of the former Finnish company Rosenlew, currently a trademark of Sampo-Rosenlew

== Music ==
- "Sampo", a song by Amberian Dawn on the 2010 album End of Eden
- "Sampo", a song by Amorphis on the 2009 album Skyforger

== Transport ==
- Sampo (1898 icebreaker), a Finnish icebreaker built 1898
- Sampo (1960 icebreaker), a Finnish icebreaker built 1960

== Others ==
- Sampo (brachiopod), a fossil brachiopod genus
- Sampo (district), a city area of Tampere, Pirkanmaa, Finland
- Sampo (film), a 1959 Soviet-Finnish film
- 2091 Sampo, a main-belt asteroid
- Sampo generation, a South Korean social trend
- Sampo, a playable character in Honkai: Star Rail
