= Sampo (name) =

Sampo is a Finnish given name. It is also a surname. Notable people with the name include:

- Sampo Ala (born 2002), Finnish footballer
- Sampo Ala-Iso (born 2003), Finnish footballer
- Sampo Haapamäki (born 1979), Finnish composer
- Sampo Karjalainen (born 1977) is one of the original founders of Sulake and Habbo Hotel
- Sampo Koskinen (born 1979), Finnish former professional footballer and coach
- Sampo Marjomaa (born 1976), Finnish television personality and entertainer
- Sampo Ranta (born 2000), Finnish ice hockey player
- Sampo Terho (born 1977), Finnish politician

=== Surname ===
- Josh Sampo (born 1984), American mixed martial artist
- Peter V. Sampo (1931–2020), American founder of liberal arts colleges

=== Fictional name ===
- Sampo, the protagonist of the 1860 fairy tale Sampo Lappelill by Finnish writer Zachris Topelius
- Sampo Koski, a playable character in Honkai: Star Rail
