= Sam Cosgrove =

English footballer (born 1996)

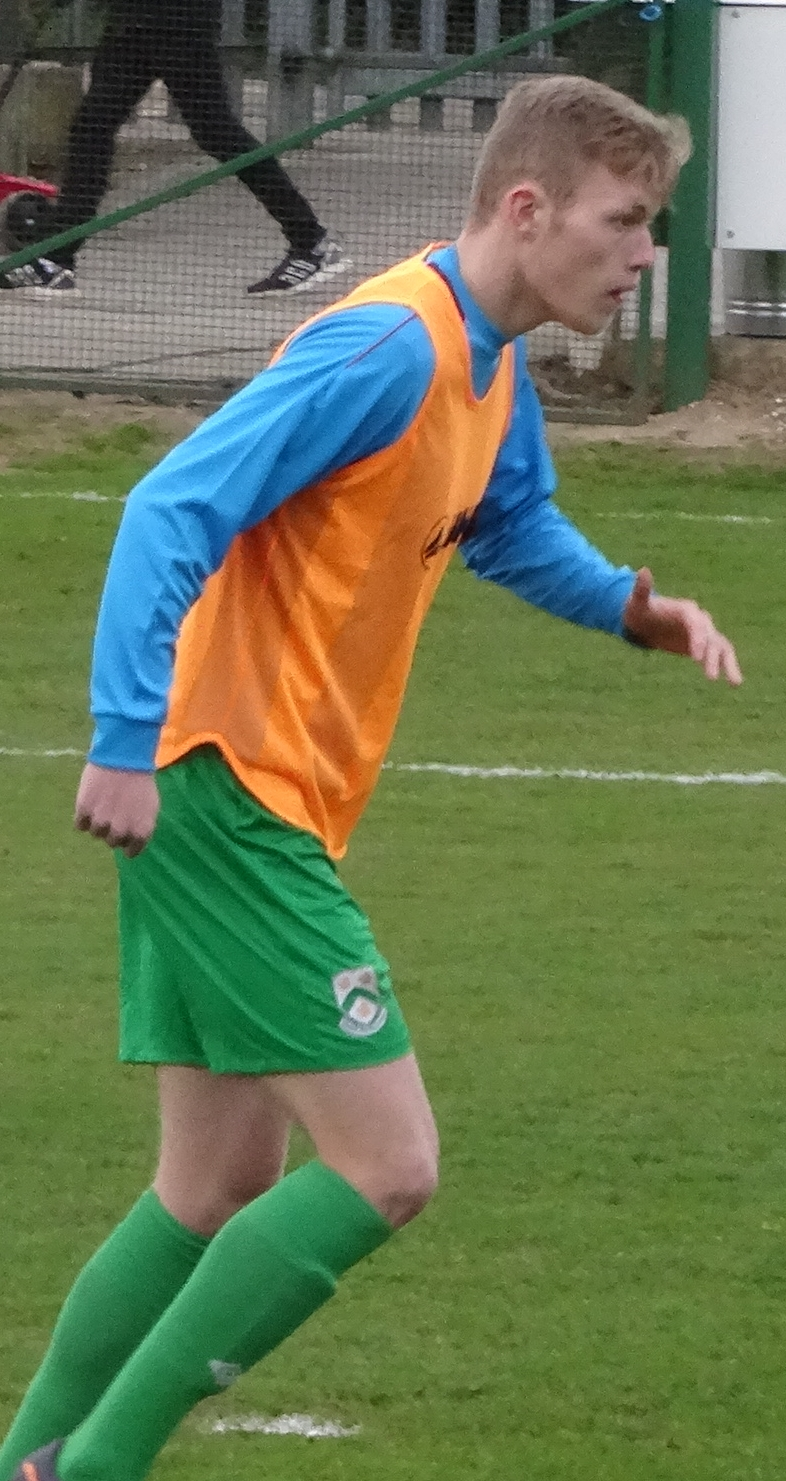
- Cosgrove warming up for North Ferriby United in 2017

Personal information
- Full name: Sam Benjamin Cosgrove
- Date of birth: 2 December 1996 (age 29)
- Place of birth: Beverley, England
- Height: 6 ft 4 in (1.92 m)
- Position: Striker

Team information
- Current team: Auckland FC
- Number: 9

Youth career
- Everton
- 2013–2015: Wigan Athletic

Senior career*
| Years | Team | Apps | (Gls) |
| 2015–2017 | Wigan Athletic | 0 | (0) |
| 2015 | → Barrow (loan) | 5 | (0) |
| 2015 | → Chorley (loan) | 1 | (0) |
| 2016 | → Nantwich Town (loan) | | |
| 2017 | → North Ferriby United (loan) | 14 | (0) |
| 2017–2018 | Carlisle United | 8 | (1) |
| 2018–2021 | Aberdeen | 79 | (31) |
| 2021–2023 | Birmingham City | 14 | (0) |
| 2021–2022 | → Shrewsbury Town (loan) | 17 | (2) |
| 2022 | → AFC Wimbledon (loan) | 15 | (1) |
| 2022–2023 | → Plymouth Argyle (loan) | 33 | (8) |
| 2023–2025 | Barnsley | 51 | (4) |
| 2025 | → Stockport County (loan) | 7 | (0) |
| 2025– | Auckland FC | 29 | (12) |
- * Club domestic league appearances and goals as of 17:53, 6 July 2026 (UTC)

Sam Benjamin Cosgrove (born 2 December 1996) is an English professional footballer who plays as a striker for A-League club Auckland FC.

Cosgrove began his career with Wigan Athletic, and had loan spells in non-league football with Barrow, Chorley, Nantwich Town and North Ferriby United before making his Football League debut with Carlisle United. A successful three seasons with Aberdeen in the Scottish Premiership preceded a return to English football with Birmingham City in 2021. After loans at Shrewsbury Town, AFC Wimbledon and Plymouth Argyle, he signed for Barnsley in 2023. He had a loan spell at Stockport County, and upon the end of his contract at Barnsley, Cosgrove moved to New Zealand, signing for Auckland FC.

== Career ==
=== Early life and career ===
Cosgrove was born in 1996 in Beverley, in the East Riding of Yorkshire. His family moved to Cheshire while he was still a baby, and he attended Knutsford High School. He grew up as a Manchester City fan. Cosgrove began his youth football career as an under-10 with Everton, but was released at 16. He signed scholarship forms with Wigan Athletic in 2013, and took his A levels during that time rather than the standard sports-related BTEC course.

Cosgrove's first matchday involvement with the senior team came while he was still a second-year scholar, as part of his development process, when manager Malky Mackay named him as a substitute for the FA Cup third round visit to Bolton Wanderers on 3 January 2015. He remained part of the squad for four league matches during January, each time as an unused substitute. Having scored 44 goals from 40 matches over two years with Wigan's Under-18 team, he was one of six scholars to be offered their first professional contracts.

In the 2015–16 season, Cosgrove gained experience from three spells on loan in non-league football. He made his senior debut for National League club Barrow on 18 August 2015, as a late substitute in a 1–1 draw with Guiseley. Starting in place of the injured Andy Cook, he "produced a solid display" in the next game, a defeat to Cheltenham Town, but after Cook's return he played only a few minutes' football and was recalled by Wigan. He joined Chorley on 25 November until the following 2 January, and played only 20 minutes in the National League North. but after his winning goal in a Lancashire Challenge Trophy match, Chorley manager Matt Jansen said that Cosgrove had "pace to burn, he's big and strong and if he believes in himself he could do very well." His third loan was at Nantwich Town of the Northern Premier League Premier Division. A debut goal was disallowed for offside, but he did score Nantwich's 100th goal of the season a few weeks later.

Cosgrove signed a one-year contract with Wigan in June 2016, and made his debut as a late substitute in the EFL Cup against Oldham Athletic in August. He spent the second half of the on loan at North Ferriby United, made 14 National League appearances (3 starts) without scoring, and was released by Wigan when his contract expired.

=== Carlisle United ===
After a trial in pre-season, Cosgrove signed for League Two club Carlisle United on 1 August 2017 on a short–term deal until January. Against Fleetwood Town in the first round of the EFL Cup on 8 August, he came on as a 90th-minute substitute and helped the team win 2–1 after extra time. Four days later, he made his Football League debut, again as a substitute, in a 2–1 win against Cambridge United. Cosgrove found his first-team opportunities limited: he was a regular on the bench but rarely left it. He made an unexpected first start on New Year's Day in a loss to Mansfield Town, he was man of the match in a goalless draw with Championship club Sheffield Wednesday in the FA Cup, his contract was extended to the end of the season, and on 13 January he scored his first goal to secure a 1–0 win against Crewe Alexandra. He played twice more before the club accepted a bid for his services.

=== Aberdeen ===
On 31 January 2018, Cosgrove signed a two-and-a-half-year contract with Scottish Premiership club Aberdeen for an undisclosed fee, variously reported as £25,000, £30,000, or £40,000. The player had signed a pre-contract agreement with Aberdeen to join at the end of the season, but the Carlisle club "reluctantly" decided it would be better not to wait. Eight minutes into his debut, a 2–0 defeat against Celtic on 25 February, he was sent off for a "reckless challenge" on opposing captain Scott Brown. After playing just 11 minutes in the Scottish Cup over the next few weeks, he made his first Aberdeen start on 27 April, set up a goal for Anthony O'Connor in a 2–0 win against Hearts, and helped them beat Celtic in the last match of the season to finish as runners-up.

Aberdeen legend Willie Miller wrote that Cosgrove was well placed to fill the striker vacancy caused by Adam Rooney's departure, and might have the mentality to seize the opportunity, but his impression was that manager Derek McInnes felt he "still [had] a lot of developing to do". McInnes spoke of the importance to the team of his "size, his strength, his willingness to occupy defenders" after Cosgrove scored an "emphatic header" against West Bromwich Albion in pre-season. In the Europa League qualifier against Burnley, he won a penalty, converted by Gary Mackay-Steven to open the scoring in a 1–1 draw; although they lost the second leg after extra time, he took confidence from performing well against top-class defenders. Alternating between starter and substitute, he finally scored for the club on his 17th appearance, with two goals in a 4–1 win against St Mirren on 6 October.

Cosgrove started the Scottish League Cup Final, which Aberdeen lost 1–0 to Celtic on 2 December. In the next match, in which Aberdeen beat Rangers at Ibrox, he was sent off for a second bookable offence which pundits felt was not a foul. After serving a one-match ban, he scored and assisted in a 3–2 win against Livingston; a booking for simulation was rescinded. Six more goals in December earned him the Scottish Premiership Player of the Month award. He signed a contract extension to 2022, scored three more goals in January and five in February, but then his scoring form dipped. He reached his target of 20 on 6 April, but it was the last day of the season before the 21st arrived. His 17 Premiership goals placed him second only to Rangers' Alfredo Morelos (18) as top scorer.

Strike partner Stevie May saw the team's improved creativity as a factor in Cosgrove's greater effectiveness, while McInnes highlighted how a focus on "movement, anticipation and speed of thought" helped him react more like a smaller striker than a pure target man. He became increasingly "capable of impacting games from a deeper position" using his pace. Six goals in four Europa League qualifiers, including a hat-trick against Chikhura Sachkhere, proved McInnes' point that Aberdeen had been right to persevere with Cosgrove despite media criticism. He continued with two goals in a 3–2 league win against Hearts, an extra-time winner in the League Cup, and 11 goals from his next 18 matches, in the last of which he was controversially sent off for a forceful tackle. He set himself a 30-goal target, last achieved for Aberdeen by Joe Harper in 1978–79, but a seven-match goal drought and a back injury left him on 23 and the team in fourth place when the season was curtailed because of the COVID-19 pandemic.

Despite reports of interest from clubs in England and further afield during the past season, Aberdeen confirmed that there had been no offers. In July 2020, the club accepted a bid in excess of £2 million from French club Guingamp for Cosgrove, who rejected the move. He then damaged a knee and was out for three months, during which time he was one of eight Aberdeen players who were heavily fined by the club and received a suspended three-match ban from the Scottish Football Association after breaching COVID protocols by visiting a bar as a group. He returned to action on 25 October, set up a goal for Ryan Hedges in a 3–3 draw with Celtic, and scored two weeks later, but his lack of match fitness was telling. He was not starting regularly, and fellow striker Curtis Main was out of form; by the end of January, they had three goals apiece. Financial Fair Play restrictions reportedly put Cosgrove out of Sheffield Wednesday's reach, but a £2 million bid from Birmingham City was accepted. Cosgrove later revealed that he had a heart scare during his time with Aberdeen.

=== Birmingham City ===
Cosgrove signed a three-and-a-half-year contract with Championship club Birmingham City on 31 January 2021. The fee was officially undisclosed. The News and Star reported that Carlisle United would benefit from a sell-on clause, possibly to the extent of 20% of Aberdeen's profit on the deal. He made his debut on 6 February as a very late substitute in a 3–2 defeat away to AFC Bournemouth, but although the team were in need of goals and head coach Aitor Karanka stated that if the January signings "don't start [on 13 February] they will do it soon", his three appearances before Karanka was sacked a month later were all from the bench. Incoming head coach Lee Bowyer, tasked with achieving Championship survival, selected Scott Hogan and Lukas Jutkiewicz as his strike pairing of choice. He saw Cosgrove as a potential like-for-like replacement for Jutkiewicz, but without the latter's physicality and consistency of performance, and it was only when relegation was avoided with two matches still to play that Cosgrove made his first start as one of the many squad players whom Bowyer wanted to assess.

==== Loans to Shrewsbury Town and AFC Wimbledon ====
He joined League One club Shrewsbury Town on 11 August 2021 on loan for the season, and made his debut three days later away to Morecambe, replacing Nathanael Ogbeta at half-time with his side 2–0 down. Although his side were, according to the Shropshire Star, "much sharper after the break", the score remained unchanged.

Cosgrove was recalled from Shrewsbury and signed for another League One team, AFC Wimbledon, on 31 January 2022 on loan for the rest of the season. Not registered in time for the next day's match, he started and played 67 minutes in a 3–2 defeat away to Charlton Athletic on 5 February.

==== Loan to Plymouth Argyle ====
He made three first-team appearances for Birmingham in August 2022, before returning to League One when he joined Plymouth Argyle on 1 September on loan for the remainder of the season. He made his debut two days later, coming on after 75 minutes of Argyle's visit to Derby County with his side 2–1 down. With his first touch of the ball, he turned Niall Ennis's cross-shot into the net, and on 90 minutes, he broke at pace and beat the goalkeeper with a low shot to secure a 3–2 win.

On 21 December, Cosgrove scored a second-half hat-trick against AFC Wimbledon in the EFL Trophy. Argyle trailed 3–0 at half-time, but Cosgrove's goals against his former club took the tie to penalties, which Plymouth won 4–3 to book their place in the quarter-finals.

Cosgrove ended his spell at Plymouth with a League One winners' medal. He scored twelve goals in all competitions for the club.

=== Barnsley ===
Cosgrove played twice for Birmingham in the 2023–24 EFL Cup and was a regular on the bench in Championship matches, before he was released on 1 September to enable him to join League One club Barnsley on a two-year contract.

With his Barnsley contract due to expire, Cosgrove joined League One rivals Stockport County on 3 February 2025 on loan until the end of the 2024–25 season. He was released by Barnsley at the end of the 2024–25 season.

=== Auckland FC ===
On 19 August 2025, Auckland FC announced Cosgrove as their newest signing, with him filling their fifth foreign players slot.

On 1 November 2025, Cosgrove scored his first goal in a 2–1 win over Adelaide United. On 14 March 2026, Cosgrove scored a brace in a 2–1 win over the Newcastle Jets, scoring his ninth and tenth goals of the campaign and becoming the first Auckland FC player to score 10 or more goals in a single season.

Following the conclusion of the regular season on 26 April, Cosgrove was awarded the A-League Men Golden Boot, becoming the first Englishman to win the award. He shared the honour with Luka Jovanović, with both players finishing on 11 goals, the lowest since the 2006–07 season. Cosgrove was later included in the Professional Footballers Australia (PFA) A-League Team of the Season, alongside teammates Jesse Randall and Francis de Vries.

Cosgrove featured in all four of Auckland FC's A-League Men finals series matches despite playing with ruptured ankle ligaments, including in the grand final, as Auckland defeated Sydney FC 1–0 to become the first New Zealand club to win the A-League Men Championship.

On 26 August 2026, Cosgrove was shown a straight red card in Auckland FC's 1–0 defeat to Al-Ahli in the FIFA Intercontinental Cup at King Abdullah Sports City Stadium, following a lunging challenge on Valentin Atangana. The red card resulted in a two-match suspension, which ruled him out of the opening two matches of the 2026–27 season.

== Career statistics ==
As of match played 26 August 2026

Appearances and goals by club, season and competition
| Club | Season | League | | | National cup (Note: Includes FA Cup, Scottish Cup, Australia Cup) | | League cup (Note: Includes EFL Cup, Scottish League Cup) | | Other | | Total | |
| Club | Season | Division | Apps | Goals | Apps | Goals | Apps | Goals | Apps | Goals | Apps | Goals |
|---|---|---|---|---|---|---|---|---|---|---|---|---|
| Wigan Athletic | 2015–16 | League One | 0 | 0 | 0 | 0 | 0 | 0 | 0 | 0 | 0 | 0 |
| Wigan Athletic | 2016–17 | Championship | 0 | 0 | 0 | 0 | 1 | 0 | 0 | 0 | 1 | 0 |
| Wigan Athletic | Total | | 0 | 0 | 0 | 0 | 1 | 0 | 0 | 0 | 1 | 0 |
| Barrow (loan) | 2015–16 | National League | 5 | 0 | 0 | 0 | — | | 0 | 0 | 5 | 0 |
| Chorley (loan) | 2015–16 | National League North | 1 | 0 | 0 | 0 | — | | | | 1 | 0 |
| North Ferriby United (loan) | 2016–17 | National League | 14 | 0 | 0 | 0 | — | | 0 | 0 | 14 | 0 |
| Carlisle United | 2017–18 | League Two | 8 | 1 | 1 | 0 | 1 | 0 | 2 (Note: Appearances in EFL Trophy) | 0 | 12 | 1 |
| Aberdeen | 2017–18 | Scottish Premiership | 5 | 0 | 1 | 0 | 0 | 0 | 0 | 0 | 6 | 0 |
| Aberdeen | 2018–19 | Scottish Premiership | 35 | 17 | 5 | 4 | 2 | 0 | 2 (Note: Appearances in UEFA Europa League) | 0 | 44 | 21 |
| Aberdeen | 2019–20 | Scottish Premiership | 25 | 11 | 5 | 3 | 2 | 3 | 6 | 6 | 38 | 23 |
| Aberdeen | 2020–21 | Scottish Premiership | 14 | 3 | 0 | 0 | 1 | 0 | 0 | 0 | 15 | 3 |
| Aberdeen | Total | | 79 | 31 | 11 | 7 | 5 | 3 | 8 | 6 | 103 | 47 |
| Birmingham City | 2020–21 | Championship | 12 | 0 | 0 | 0 | 0 | 0 | — | | 12 | 0 |
| Birmingham City | 2021–22 | Championship | 0 | 0 | 0 | 0 | 0 | 0 | — | | 0 | 0 |
| Birmingham City | 2022–23 | Championship | 2 | 0 | 0 | 0 | 1 | 0 | — | | 3 | 0 |
| Birmingham City | 2023–24 | Championship | 0 | 0 | — | | 2 | 0 | — | | 2 | 0 |
| Birmingham City | Total | | 14 | 0 | 0 | 0 | 3 | 0 | 0 | 0 | 17 | 0 |
| Shrewsbury Town (loan) | 2021–22 | League One | 17 | 2 | 2 | 0 | 1 | 0 | 2 | 0 | 22 | 2 |
| AFC Wimbledon (loan) | 2021–22 | League One | 15 | 1 | 0 | 0 | 0 | 0 | — | | 15 | 1 |
| Plymouth Argyle (loan) | 2022–23 | League One | 33 | 8 | 1 | 0 | — | | 6 | 4 | 40 | 12 |
| Barnsley | 2023–24 | League One | 32 | 3 | 1 | 0 | — | | 5 (Note: Three appearances in EFL Trophy, two appearances and three goals in League One play-offs) | 3 | 38 | 6 |
| Barnsley | 2024–25 | League One | 19 | 1 | 1 | 0 | 2 | 0 | 0 | 0 | 22 | 1 |
| Barnsley | Total | | 51 | 4 | 2 | 0 | 2 | 0 | 5 | 3 | 60 | 7 |
| Stockport County (loan) | 2024–25 | League One | 7 | 0 | — | | — | | — | | 7 | 0 |
| Auckland FC | 2025–26 | A-League Men | 25 | 11 | 2 | 0 | — | | 4 (Note: Appearances in A-League Men finals series) | 1 | 31 | 12 |
| Auckland FC | 2026–27 | A-League Men | 0 | 0 | 0 | 0 | — | | 1 (Note: Appearance in FIFA Intercontinental Cup) | 0 | 1 | 0 |
| Auckland FC | Total | | 25 | 11 | 2 | 0 | 0 | 0 | 5 | 1 | 32 | 12 |
| Career total | | | 292 | 69 | 19 | 7 | 12 | 3 | 28 | 14 | 329 | 82 |

== Honours ==
Plymouth Argyle

- EFL League One: 2022–23
- EFL Trophy runner-up: 2022–23

Auckland FC

- A-League Men Championship: 2026

Individual

- A-League Men Golden Boot: 2025–26
