= Eerik Kantola =

Finnish footballer (born 2000)

Personal information
- Full name: Eerik Kantola
- Date of birth: 9 March 2000 (age 26)
- Place of birth: Finland
- Height: 1.79 m (5 ft 10 in)
- Position: Right back

Team information
- Current team: RoPS II
- Number: 26

Youth career
- RoPS

Senior career*
Years	Team	Apps	(Gls)
2017–	RoPS	2	(0)
2019–	RoPS II	25	(0)
- * Club domestic league appearances and goals as of 19:35, 23 June 2020 (UTC)

Eerik Kantola (born 9 March 2000) is a Finnish football player who plays as defender for the reserve team of Veikkausliiga club RoPS.

== Career ==
=== Club career ===
Kantola made his professional debut in a Finnish Cup game against AC Oulu on 6 February 2017. In the Veikkausliiga, Kantola played his first game on 19 May 2017 against SJK.
