= Niklas Jokelainen =

Finnish footballer (born 2000)

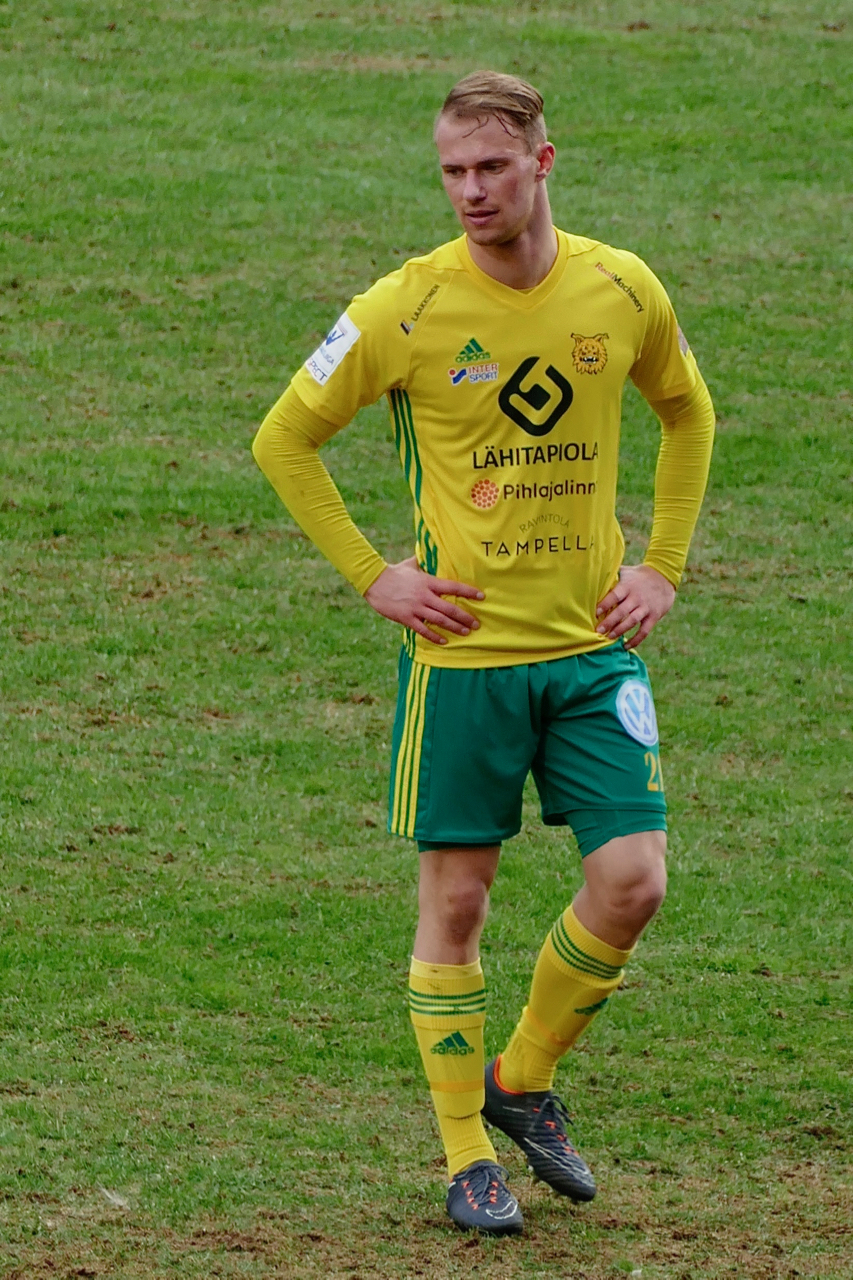
- Jokelainen with Ilves in 2018

Personal information
- Date of birth: 30 March 2000 (age 26)
- Place of birth: Oulu, Finland
- Height: 1.81 m (5 ft 11 in)
- Positions: Forward; midfielder

Team information
- Current team: AC Oulu
- Number: 14

Youth career
- Tervarit

Senior career*
Years	Team	Apps	(Gls)
2015–2016	AC Oulu	6	(0)
2016–2017	Stoke City	0	(0)
2017–2018	Ilves	18	(2)
2018	→ JJK (loan)	6	(0)
2019	RoPS	20	(2)
2019	RoPS II	6	(3)
2020–	AC Oulu	164	(27)
2022	→ OLS (loan)	1	(0)

International career
2015–2016	Finland U17	10	(2)
2017–2018	Finland U18	7	(3)
2018	Finland U19	8	(0)
2022	Finland U21	1	(0)
- * Club domestic league appearances and goals as of 12 November 2026

Niklas Jokelainen (born 30 March 2000) is a Finnish professional footballer who plays as a midfielder and captains AC Oulu in Veikkausliiga.

== Career ==
=== AC Oulu ===
His senior career began in 2015, after 14-year old Jokelainen signed a professional pre-contract in December 2014. At the age of 15 and one month, Jokelainen became the youngest player to play in the AC Oulu shirt when he made his debut in February 2015. He played in six Ykkönen matches during the 2015 and 2016 seasons, before moving to the academy of Stoke City in the summer 2016.

=== Ilves ===
In August 2017, Jokelainen returned to Finland and joined Ilves, playing in the Veikkausliiga. He made his debut in the league on 8 April 2018, and scored his first league goal on 25 April 2018 against the VPS. In the 2018 season, Jokelainen played a total of 18 league matches and one UEFA Europa League qualifying match, against Slavia Sofia.

=== RoPS ===
On 13 November 2018, Rovaniemen Palloseura (RoPS) announced that they had signed with Jokelainen for the 2019 season. Jokelainen played a total of 20 league matches and scored two goals in his first season with the club. He also played in both UEFA Europa League qualifying matches against Aberdeen.

=== Return to AC Oulu ===
Jokelainen returned to AC Oulu for the 2020 season, playing in the second-tier Ykkönen. After the 2020 season, the club won a promotion back to Veikkausliiga and Jokelainen stayed with the club. On 6 October 2022, he extended his contract with AC Oulu on a deal until the end of 2024. In April 2024, Jokelainen was named the captain of his team for the 2024 season. On 18 October, he extended his contract until the end of 2026 with a one-year option.

== Career statistics ==
As of 10 April 2025

Appearances and goals by club, season and competition
Club	Season	League			Cup (Note: Includes Suomen Cup)		League cup (Note: Includes Finnish League Cup)		Europe		Total	
Club	Season	Division	Apps	Goals	Apps	Goals	Apps	Goals	Apps	Goals	Apps	Goals
AC Oulu	2015	Ykkönen	5	0	2	1	—		—		7	1
AC Oulu	2016	Ykkönen	1	0	1	0	—		—		2	0
AC Oulu	Total		6	0	3	1	0	0	0	0	9	1
Stoke City	2016–17	Premier League	0	0	0	0	0	0	—		0	0
Ilves	2017	Veikkausliiga	0	0	0	0	—		—		0	0
Ilves	2018	Veikkausliiga	18	2	2	1	—		1 (Note: Includes UEFA Europa League)	0	21	3
Ilves	Total		18	2	2	1	0	0	1	0	21	3
JJK (loan)	2018	Ykkönen	6	0	0	0	—		—		6	0
RoPS	2019	Veikkausliiga	20	2	5	3	—		2	0	27	5
RoPS II	2019	Kakkonen	6	3	—		—		—		6	3
AC Oulu	2020	Ykkönen	21	5	6	5	—		—		27	10
AC Oulu	2021	Veikkausliiga	23	2	3	0	—		—		26	2
AC Oulu	2022	Veikkausliiga	22	4	2	0	2	0	—		26	4
AC Oulu	2023	Veikkausliiga	28	7	5	0	5	0	—		38	7
AC Oulu	2024	Veikkausliiga	21	3	4	2	4	0	—		29	5
AC Oulu	2025	Veikkausliiga	1	2	0	0	5	2	–		6	4
AC Oulu	Total		116	23	20	7	16	2	0	0	152	32
OLS	2022	Kakkonen	1	0	—		—		—		1	0
Career total			173	30	30	12	16	2	3	0	222	44

== Honours ==
AC Oulu

- Ykkönen: 2020
- Finnish League Cup runner-up: 2023

Individual

- Northern Finland Football Association: Player of the Year 2024
