= Atte Sihvonen =

Finnish footballer (born 1996)

Personal information
- Date of birth: 18 February 1996 (age 30)
- Place of birth: Finland
- Height: 1.90 m (6 ft 3 in)
- Position: Defender

Team information
- Current team: TPS
- Number: 17

Youth career
- –2016: TPS

Senior career*
Years	Team	Apps	(Gls)
2014	→ ÅIFK (loan)	5	(0)
2016	MyPa	0	(0)
2017	SalPa	15	(0)
2018	EIF	22	(4)
2019–2020	RoPS	43	(2)
2021	TPS	26	(0)
2022–2023	Haka	44	(2)
2024–	TPS	64	(2)
- * Club domestic league appearances and goals as of 13 November 2026

Atte Sihvonen (born 18 February 1996) is a Finnish footballer who plays as a defender for Veikkausliiga club TPS.

== Career ==
=== Club ===
On 21 December 2018, Sihvonen signed for RoPS on a one-year contract, with the option of an additional year.

On 10 December 2021, he signed a two-year deal with Haka.

On 12 January 2024, Sihvonen returned to his former club Turun Palloseura (TPS), signing a one-year deal with an option for extension.
