= Ryan Hedges =

Wales international footballer (born 1995)

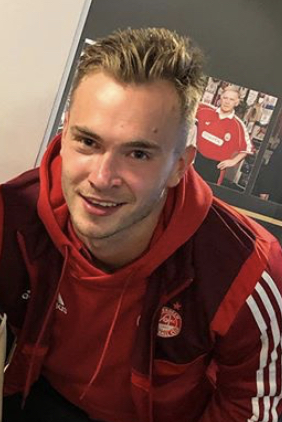
- Hedges with Aberdeen in 2019

Personal information
- Full name: Ryan Peter Hedges
- Date of birth: 8 July 1995 (age 31)
- Place of birth: Northampton, England
- Height: 1.85 m (6 ft 1 in)
- Positions: Winger; left wing-back

Team information
- Current team: Derby County
- Number: 26

Youth career
- 2003–2010: Everton
- 2010–2013: Flint Town United

Senior career*
Years	Team	Apps	(Gls)
2012–2013	Flint Town United	24	(2)
2013–2017	Swansea City	0	(0)
2015	→ Leyton Orient (loan)	17	(2)
2016	→ Stevenage (loan)	6	(0)
2016–2017	→ Yeovil Town (loan)	21	(4)
2017–2019	Barnsley	52	(2)
2019–2022	Aberdeen	66	(11)
2022–2026	Blackburn Rovers	137	(8)
2026–	Derby County	12	(0)

International career
2013–2014	Wales U19	5	(1)
2014–2016	Wales U21	11	(0)
2017–2019	Wales	3	(0)
- * Club domestic league appearances and goals as of 23:32, 31 October 2026 (UTC)

Ryan Peter Hedges (born 8 July 1995) is a professional footballer who plays as a winger or left wing-back for EFL Championship club Derby County and the Wales national team.

He made his professional debut for Leyton Orient in January 2015, on loan from Swansea City. After further loan spells at Stevenage and Yeovil Town, Hedges signed permanently for Barnsley in 2017. He joined Scottish Premiership club Aberdeen in June 2019 and later signed for EFL Championship side Blackburn Rovers in January 2022. He left Blackburn in June 2026 and signed with Derby County in August 2026.

== Early and personal life ==
Ryan Peter Hedges was born on 8 July 1995 in Northampton, England. At a young age, he moved to Wales, and would go on to attend Hawarden High School in Hawarden, a village in Flintshire. Michael Owen, Andy Dorman, Gary Speed and Danny Ward are all fellow ex-pupils from the school who would later become professional footballers. Hedges' first involvement with football began with Liverpool-based club Everton, where he spent seven years with the club in youth as a schoolboy, eventually being released at under-16 level in 2010.

== Club career ==
=== Swansea City ===
Hedges joined Swansea City from Flint Town in July 2013 following some impressive performances for the Welsh Schools Under-18 team. Hedges linked up with the Swansea City Under-21 team in the 2013–14 season, and was rewarded for his progress with a new one-year contract until June 2014.

In June 2015, Hedges signed a three-year contract extension at Swansea.

==== Leyton Orient (loan) ====
On 16 January 2015, Hedges joined League One team Leyton Orient on a one-month loan deal. He made his professional debut for Leyton Orient against Colchester United on 24 January 2015. After an impressive start, Hedges' loan was extended until the end of the 2014–15 season. Hedges scored his first professional goal for Leyton Orient, and then set up a goal for Chris Dagnall, in a 2–0 win over Walsall on 28 February 2015. Weeks later on 14 March 2015, Hedges scored his second goal for Leyton Orient in a 3–0 win over Yeovil Town. Hedges went on to make seventeen appearances, scoring twice, as Orient were relegated to League Two.

==== Stevenage (loan) ====
In February 2016, Hedges joined Stevenage on a one-month emergency loan.

==== Yeovil Town (loan) ====
On 8 July 2016, Hedges signed for League Two side Yeovil Town on a six-month loan deal.

=== Barnsley ===
On 31 January 2017, Hedges was recalled from his loan spell at Yeovil, and signed permanently for EFL Championship side Barnsley for an undisclosed fee on a two-and-a-half-year contract. He scored his first goal for Barnsley in a 3–1 loss at Bristol City on 5 August 2017.

=== Aberdeen ===
Hedges was offered a new contract by Barnsley at the end of the 2018–19 season, but he instead opted to sign a three-year contract with Scottish Premiership club Aberdeen. On 27 August 2020, he scored a hat-trick as Aberdeen won 6–0 at home against NSÍ Runavík in the Europa League first qualifying round, having only come on as a half-time substitute.

=== Blackburn Rovers ===
On 30 January 2022, Hedges joined Blackburn Rovers on a three-and-a-half-year deal, with an optional 12 month extension, for an undisclosed fee. He scored his first goal for the club on 13 September 2022 in a 2–0 win against Watford. Almost 12 months later he scored one of the contenders for goal of the season against Watford away to secure a 0–1 win.

On 19 May 2025, Blackburn announced it had triggered a one-year extension to the player's contract. Hedges made 22 appearances during the 2025–26 season, primarily operating as a left wing-back, scoring once and providing two assists. On 1 January 2026, he suffered a fractured fibula in a 2–0 defeat to Wrexham.

Manager Valérien Ismaël later confirmed that Hedges would undergo surgery and was expected to be sidelined for a minimum of eight weeks, with the full extent of the injury only to be determined following the operation, with the worst-case scenario being that Hedges would miss the remainder of the season. On 6 February, following the conclusion of the transfer window, the club released its matchday squad list for the remainder of the season, with Hedges omitted.

Hedges would later be re-added to the squad as the club were granted special dispensation to make changes after a spate of season-ending injuries, he made his return in a 3–0 defeat to Southampton at St Mary's Stadium and featured once more in the following match against Coventry City. Hedges departed the club at the conclusion of his contract.

=== Derby County ===
Following his release, he trained at Derby County under his former manager John Eustace, where he was not expected to be signed to a contract. However on 20 August 2026, Hedges did sign a one-year contract with Derby County, with an option of a second year, after a long term injury to left-back Derry Murkin. On 22 August 2026, Hedges made his Derby County debut as a 64th minute substitute for Oscar Fraulo in a 2–2 Championship draw to Cardiff City.

== International career ==
Prior to joining Swansea City, Hedges scored twice and claimed an assist as captain of the Welsh Schools Under-18s team in a 4–1 win over England. Hedges has represented Wales at under-19 and under-21 level.

He made his debut for the senior side on 14 November 2017 as a substitute during a 1–1 draw with Panama.

== Career statistics ==
=== Club ===
As of match played 31 October 2026

Appearances and goals by club, season and competition
Club	Season	League			National Cup		League Cup		Other		Total	
Club	Season	Division	Apps	Goals	Apps	Goals	Apps	Goals	Apps	Goals	Apps	Goals
Flint Town United	2012–13	Cymru Alliance	24	2	—		—		—		24	2
Swansea City	2013–14	Premier League	0	0	0	0	0	0	0	0	0	0
Swansea City	2014–15	Premier League	0	0	0	0	0	0	—		0	0
Swansea City	2015–16	Premier League	0	0	0	0	0	0	—		0	0
Swansea City	2016–17	Premier League	0	0	—		—		—		0	0
Swansea City	Total		0	0	0	0	0	0	0	0	0	0
Leyton Orient (loan)	2014–15	League One	17	2	—		—		—		17	2
Stevenage (loan)	2015–16	League Two	6	0	—		—		—		6	0
Yeovil Town (loan)	2016–17	League Two	21	4	2	1	2	0	3 (Note: Appearances in EFL Trophy)	0	28	5
Barnsley	2016–17	Championship	8	0	—		—		—		8	0
Barnsley	2017–18	Championship	23	2	0	0	3	1	—		26	3
Barnsley	2018–19	League One	21	0	2	0	0	0	2	1	25	1
Barnsley	Total		52	2	2	0	3	1	2	1	59	4
Aberdeen	2019–20	Scottish Premiership	22	4	2	0	2	0	6 (Note: Appearances in the UEFA Europa League)	0	32	4
Aberdeen	2020–21	Scottish Premiership	28	5	0	0	1	0	3	4	32	9
Aberdeen	2021–22	Scottish Premiership	16	2	1	1	1	0	4 (Note: Appearances in the UEFA Europa Conference League)	2	22	5
Aberdeen	Total		66	11	3	1	4	0	13	6	86	18
Blackburn Rovers	2021–22	Championship	11	0	—		—		—		11	0
Blackburn Rovers	2022–23	Championship	43	4	4	0	1	0	—		48	4
Blackburn Rovers	2023–24	Championship	17	2	0	0	1	0	—		18	2
Blackburn Rovers	2024–25	Championship	42	1	1	0	1	0	—		44	1
Blackburn Rovers	2025–26	Championship	24	1	0	0	0	0	—		24	1
Blackburn Rovers	Total		137	8	5	0	3	0	—		145	8
Derby County	2026–27	Championship	12	0	0	0	—		—		12	0
Career total			335	29	12	2	12	1	18	7	377	39

=== International ===
Appearances and goals by national team and year
National team	Year	Apps	Goals
Wales	2017	1	0
Wales	2018	1	0
Wales	2019	1	0
Total		3	0

== Honours ==
=== Club ===
Barnsley

- EFL League One runner-up: 2018–19
