= Juho Hyvärinen =

Finnish footballer (born 2000)

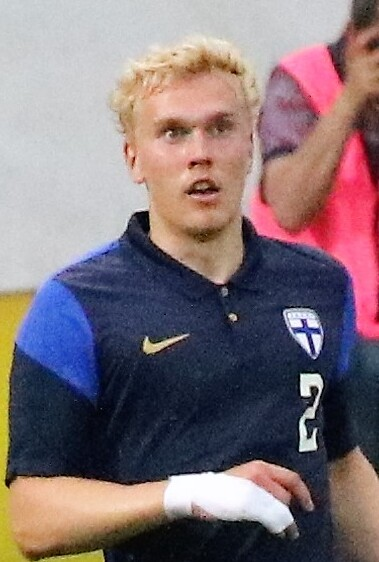
- Hyvärinen with Finland U21 in 2022

Personal information
- Full name: Juho Anttoni Hyvärinen
- Date of birth: 27 March 2000 (age 26)
- Place of birth: Finland
- Height: 1.78 m (5 ft 10 in)
- Positions: Defender; midfielder

Team information
- Current team: Rollon Pojat

Senior career*
Years	Team	Apps	(Gls)
2016–2020	RoPS	86	(5)
2017	→ Santa Claus (loan)	3	(1)
2021–2023	Inter Turku	42	(2)
2024	VPS	17	(0)
2025–	Rollon Pojat	0	(0)

International career^{‡}
2016–2017	Finland U17	6	(0)
2018	Finland U19	3	(0)
2019–2022	Finland U21	17	(0)
- * Club domestic league appearances and goals as of 23 October 2024 ‡ National team caps and goals as of 19 April 2023

Juho Anttoni Hyvärinen (born 27 March 2000) is a Finnish footballer who plays on the wing as a defender for Kolmonen club Rollon Pojat.

== Career statistics ==
As of 15 February 2025

Appearances and goals by club, season and competition
Club	Season	League			Cup (Note: Includes Suomen Cup)		League cup (Note: Includes Finnish League Cup)		Europe		Total	
Club	Season	Division	Apps	Goals	Apps	Goals	Apps	Goals	Apps	Goals	Apps	Goals
RoPS	2016	Veikkausliiga	1	0	0	0	2	0	–		3	0
RoPS	2017	Veikkausliiga	18	1	5	0	–		–		23	1
RoPS	2018	Veikkausliiga	17	1	4	0	–		–		21	1
RoPS	2019	Veikkausliiga	26	2	5	1	–		2 (Note: Appearances in UEFA Europa League)	0	33	3
RoPS	2020	Veikkausliiga	22	1	1	0	–		–		23	1
RoPS	Total		84	5	15	1	2	0	2	0	103	6
Santa Claus (loan)	2017	Kolmonen	3	1	–		–		–		3	1
RoPS II	2019	Kakkonen	2	0	–		–		–		2	0
Inter Turku	2021	Veikkausliiga	14	1	5	0	–		2 (Note: Appearances in UEFA Conference League)	0	21	1
Inter Turku	2022	Veikkausliiga	19	1	3	0	3	0	1	0	26	1
Inter Turku	2023	Veikkausliiga	9	0	1	0	5	0	–		15	0
Inter Turku	Total		42	2	9	0	8	0	3	0	62	2
Inter Turku II	2023	Kolmonen	8	1	–		–		–		8	1
VPS	2024	Veikkausliiga	17	0	2	0	5	0	0	0	24	0
Rollon Pojat	2025	Kolmonen	0	0	0	0	–		–		0	0
Career total			156	9	26	1	15	0	5	0	202	10
