= Henrik Ölander =

Finnish footballer (born 1997)

Personal information
- Date of birth: 29 October 1997 (age 29)
- Place of birth: Finland
- Height: 1.76 m (5 ft 9 in)
- Position: Left back

Team information
- Current team: JäPS
- Number: 20

Youth career
- HJK

Senior career*
Years	Team	Apps	(Gls)
2015–2017	Klubi 04	49	(3)
2017	HJK	0	(0)
2018	PS Kemi	12	(0)
2019	RoPS	14	(0)
2020–2021	AC Oulu	34	(0)
2022–2024	Gnistan	68	(0)
2025–	JäPS	49	(1)
- * Club domestic league appearances and goals as of 1 November 2026

Henrik Ölander (born 29 October 1997) is a Finnish professional footballer who plays as a left back for Ykkösliiga club JäPS.

== Career ==
Ölander's senior career began when he was promoted to HJK's second team, Klubi 04. During the 2015–2017 seasons, Ölander played a total of 49 matches in Kakkonen, but was unable to play for HJK's first team.

Ölander then moved to Veikkausliiga club, PS Kemi, for the 2018 season. Ölander made his debut in the Veikkausliiga on 3 May 2018 against VPS. He played a total of 12 league matches in the 2018 season. PS Kemi was relegated to Ykkönen at the end of the season and later went bankrupt. He then moved to RoPS, who played in the Veikkausliiga for the 2019 season. Ölander played a total of 14 league matches in the 2019 season.

Ölander moved to Ykkönen club AC Oulu for the 2020 season.

On 29 December 2021, he signed with Gnistan for the 2022 season.
