= Samuel Olabisi =

Nigerian footballer (born 1993)

Personal information
- Full name: Samuel Olawunmi Olabisi
- Date of birth: 10 August 1993 (age 33)
- Place of birth: Ota, Ogun, Nigeria
- Height: 1.88 m (6 ft 2 in)
- Position: Centre back

Team information
- Current team: Rollon Pojat

Senior career*
Years	Team	Apps	(Gls)
2012–2013	Shooting Stars	22	(0)
2013–2014	Kukësi		
2014–2015	Taraba	19	(1)
2015	Ifeanyi Ubah	12	(0)
2016	Lobi Stars	1	(0)
2016–2017	Shooting Stars	20	(1)
2018	TP-47	10	(1)
2019–2020	RoPS	10	(0)
2019–2020	RoPS II	18	(5)
2021	OTP	18	(1)
2021	SalPa	15	(0)
2022–2024	RoPS	56	(3)
2025–	Rollon Pojat	3	(0)
- * Club domestic league appearances and goals as of 4 June 2025

Samuel Olawunmi Olabisi (born 10 August 1993) is a Nigerian professional football player who plays as a centre back for Rollon Pojat in Kolmonen.
