= Dean Campbell =

Scottish footballer (born 2001)

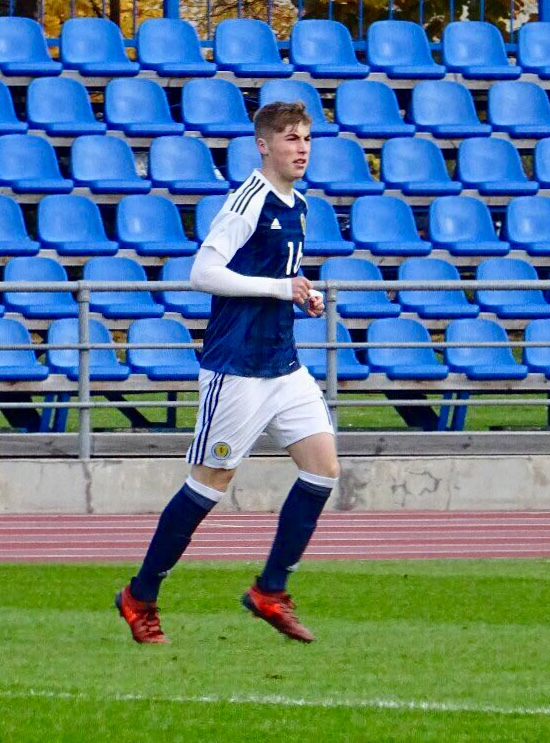
- Campbell in 2017

Personal information
- Full name: Dean Graeme Campbell
- Date of birth: 19 March 2001 (age 25)
- Place of birth: Bridge of Don, Scotland
- Height: 1.81 m (5 ft 11 in)
- Position: Midfielder

Team information
- Current team: Notts County
- Number: 4

Youth career
- 2009–2023: Aberdeen

Senior career*
Years	Team	Apps	(Gls)
2017–2023	Aberdeen	57	(1)
2022	→ Kilmarnock (loan)	8	(0)
2022–2023	→ Stevenage (loan)	14	(0)
2023–2025	Barrow	78	(5)
2025–2026	Northampton Town	42	(0)
2026–	Notts County	1	(0)

International career^{‡}
2015	Scotland U14	3	
2015	Scotland U15	1	
2016–2017	Scotland U16	7	
2016–2018	Scotland U17	12	(4)
2018	Scotland U18	1	(0)
2018	Scotland U19	6	(0)
- * Club domestic league appearances and goals as of 30 August 2026 (UTC) ‡ National team caps and goals as of 18:46, 19 October 2019 (UTC)

Dean Graeme Campbell (born 19 March 2001) is a Scottish professional footballer who plays as a midfielder for EFL League One club Notts County.

== Club career ==
=== Aberdeen ===
Campbell made his first-team debut for Aberdeen as a late substitute in a league match against Celtic on 12 May 2017, aged 16 years, 1 month, 23 days. In doing so he became the youngest ever Aberdeen player, breaking a record previously held by Jack Grimmer, and also became the first player from the Scottish Football Association's performance school programme to make their senior competitive debut. Earlier the same day he sat an English exam at his school, Hazlehead Academy.

A few days prior to his debut, Campbell had been named as the club's Academy 'Player of the year' for the third year in succession.

Campbell's second league appearance came one year and one day after his first, against the same opponents Celtic; again he was introduced as a substitute, and played his part in a 1–0 win for his team (a first league victory at Celtic Park since 2004) which secured runners-up spot on the last day of the season.

On 10 September 2018 Campbell signed a contract extension, keeping him at the club until Summer 2021. He scored his first professional goal on 29 December 2018, the second in a 2–1 away win at Livingston in the Scottish Premiership.

On 12 March 2019, while still 17 years old, Campbell made his first start for Aberdeen in a 2–0 Scottish Cup quarter-final replay victory against Rangers at Ibrox Stadium. On 3 April 2019, two weeks after his 18th birthday, he made his first league start for the Dons in a 3–1 Premiership win against Motherwell.

Campbell signed a new three-and-a-half-year contract with Aberdeen on 13 December 2019. At the end of the season it was announced that he had won the club's Young Player of the Year award for season 2019–20.

Campbell moved on loan to Kilmarnock in February 2022.

On 15 June 2022, Campbell joined League Two club Stevenage on loan for the duration of the 2022–23 season. On 8 January 2023, Campbell scored the 91st-minute winner in a 2–1 victory against Premier League side Aston Villa in the FA Cup third round, proving to be his only goal for the club. He left Aberdeen in 2023 after fourteen years.

=== Barrow ===
On 23 June 2023, Barrow announced they had signed Campbell on a two-year deal.

== International career ==
Campbell was a member of the Scotland under-16 squad for the 2016 Victory Shield tournament.

On 13 February 2018, Campbell scored twice (both goals from the penalty spot) as Scotland under-17s beat Spain 2–1 in Marbella, the first Scotland national team to win in Spain since the full team did so in 1963.

On 10 October 2018, Campbell captained Scotland under-18s as they drew 1–1 with Uzbekistan in a friendly international.

Campbell was named in the Scotland under-19s squad for the first round of qualifiers for the Euro 2019 U19 championships and made his debut in a 5–0 win against San Marino on 17 November 2018, and was a second-half substitute in a 2–2 draw against Sweden 3 days later, a result which guaranteed Scotland topped their section and progression to the elite round of qualification, eventually missing out, losing out in the final game to defending champions Portugal.

He was named in the Under 19 squad for the first round of qualifiers for the Euro 2020 U19 championships, starting all three games, including a 1–0 victory over Germany. This result meant Scotland again topped their group and progressed to the elite qualification round.

On 11 November 2019, he received his first call up to the Scotland under-21s for a Euro 2021 qualifier against Greece

== Career statistics ==
As of match played 6 August 2026

Club	Season	League			National Cup		League Cup		Other		Total	
Club	Season	Division	Apps	Goals	Apps	Goals	Apps	Goals	Apps	Goals	Apps	Goals
Aberdeen	2016–17	Scottish Premiership	1	0	0	0	0	0	0	0	1	0
Aberdeen	2017–18	Scottish Premiership	1	0	0	0	0	0	0	0	1	0
Aberdeen	2018–19	Scottish Premiership	8	1	2	0	0	0	0	0	10	1
Aberdeen	2019–20	Scottish Premiership	15	0	4	0	2	0	5 (Note: Appearances in the UEFA Europa League)	0	26	0
Aberdeen	2020–21	Scottish Premiership	20	0	3	0	1	0	0	0	24	0
Aberdeen	2021–22	Scottish Premiership	12	0	0	0	0	0	1 (Note: Appearances in the UEFA Europa Conference League)	0	13	0
Aberdeen	Total		57	1	9	0	3	0	6	0	75	1
Aberdeen U20/U21 (Note: Appearances in the Scottish Challenge Cup, in which teams from the SPFL Development League compete against senior clubs)	2017–18	—							2	0	2	0
Aberdeen U20/U21	2018–19	—							1	0	1	0
Aberdeen U20/U21	Total		0	0	0	0	0	0	3	0	3	0
Kilmarnock (loan)	2021–22	Scottish Championship	8	0	0	0	0	0	1	0	9	0
Stevenage (loan)	2022–23	League Two	14	0	4	1	3	0	5 (Note: Appearances in EFL Trophy)	0	26	1
Barrow	2023–24	League Two	45	4	1	0	1	0	0	0	47	4
Barrow	2024–25	League Two	33	1	1	0	3	0	2	0	39	1
Barrow	Total		78	5	2	0	4	0	2	0	86	5
Northampton Town	2025–26	League One	42	0	0	0	1	0	5	0	48	0
Career total			199	6	15	1	11	0	22	0	247	7
