= Jean-Christophe Coubronne =

French footballer (born 1989)

Personal information
- Date of birth: 30 July 1989 (age 37)
- Place of birth: Lyon, France
- Height: 1.80 m (5 ft 11 in)
- Position: Right back

Youth career
- FC Sochaux

Senior career*
Years	Team	Apps	(Gls)
2009–2012	Novara	20	(1)
2013–2018	Olhanense	90	(3)
2018	KTP	23	(1)
2019–2021	Lahti	61	(1)
2022–2023	Mariehamn	44	(0)
- * Club domestic league appearances and goals as of 11 June 2024

Jean-Christophe Coubronne (born 30 July 1989) is a French footballer who plays as a defender. Besides France, he has played in Italy, Portugal, and Finland.

== Career ==
=== FC Lahti ===
On 27 November 2018, FC Lahti announced the signing of Coubronne for the 2019 season.

=== IFK Mariehamn ===
On 18 January 2022, he joined Mariehamn for the 2022 season.

== Career statistics ==
As of 11 June 2024

Appearances and goals by club, season and competition
Club	Season	League			National cup (Note: Includes Coppa Italia, Taça de Portugal, Suomen Cup)		Continental		Other		Total	
Club	Season	Division	Apps	Goals	Apps	Goals	Apps	Goals	Apps	Goals	Apps	Goals
Novara	2009–10	Lega Pro Prima Divisione	14	0	2	0	–		–		16	0
Novara	2010–11	Serie B	5	1	2	0	–		–		7	1
Novara	2011–12	Serie A	1	0	0	0	–		–		1	0
Novara	Total		20	1	4	0	0	0	0	0	24	1
Olhanense	2013–14	Primeira Liga	5	0	0	0	–		2 (Note: Includes Taça da Liga)	0	7	0
Olhanense	2014–15	LigaPro	17	0	0	0	–		–		17	0
Olhanense	2015–16	LigaPro	32	1	1	0	–		–		33	1
Olhanense	2016–17	LigaPro	36	2	0	0	–		1	0	37	2
Olhanense	Total		90	3	1	0	0	0	3	0	94	3
KTP	2018	Ykkönen	23	1	1	1	–		–		24	2
Lahti	2019	Veikkausliiga	23	0	7	2	–		–		30	2
Lahti	2020	Veikkausliiga	18	1	8	0	–		–		26	1
Lahti	2021	Veikkausliiga	20	0	3	0	–		–		23	0
Lahti	Total		61	1	18	2	0	0	3	0	79	3
Mariehamn	2022	Veikkausliiga	23	0	3	0	–		3 (Note: Includes Finnish League Cup)	0	29	0
Mariehamn	2023	Veikkausliiga	21	0	5	0	–		4	0	30	0
Mariehamn	Total		44	0	8	0	0	0	7	0	59	0
Career total			238	6	32	3	0	0	10	0	280	9
