= Kirill Bullat =

Finnish footballer (born 2003)

Personal information
- Date of birth: 8 June 2003 (age 23)
- Place of birth: Finland
- Position: Midfielder

Team information
- Current team: JFK Ventspils
- Number: 31

Youth career
- Zenit
- Lokomotiv
- Kolomyagin
- –2019: RoPS

Senior career*
Years	Team	Apps	(Gls)
2019–2021	RoPS II	18	(1)
2019–2024	RoPS	26	(0)
2025	1 KS Ślęza Wrocław	2	(0)
2026–	JFK Ventspils	14	(1)

International career
2018	Finland U16	4	(0)
- * Club domestic league appearances and goals as of 14:40, 28 July 2026 (UTC)

Kirill Bullat (born 8 June 2003) is a Finnish professional footballer who plays as a midfielder for Latvian club JFK Ventspils.

== Club career ==
Bullat debuted in Veikkausliiga with his hometown club RoPS in the 2020 season. At the end of the season, he was named the club's Young Player of the Year.

In February 2025, he joined Polish club 1 KS Ślęza Wrocław, competing in the country's fourth-tier III liga.

== Personal life ==
Bullat was born in Sotkamo, Finland. His mother is Finnish and his father is Russian.
