= Fabrice Gatambiye =

Finnish footballer (born 2000)

Personal information
- Full name: Fabrice Gatambiye Ngarura
- Date of birth: 19 January 2000 (age 26)
- Position: Midfielder

Team information
- Current team: VIFK

Senior career*
Years	Team	Apps	(Gls)
2018–2021	VPS	57	(2)
2019	→ VPS II (loan)	9	(0)
2022	Gnistan	21	(2)
2023–	VIFK	0	(0)
- * Club domestic league appearances and goals as of 31 December 2022

Fabrice Gatambiye Ngarura (born 19 January 2000) is a Finnish professional footballer who plays as a midfielder for VIFK. He was born in the Democratic Republic of the Congo.

== Club career ==
On 9 March 2022, Gatambiye signed with Gnistan for the 2022 season.
