= Youness Rahimi =

Finnish footballer (born 1995)

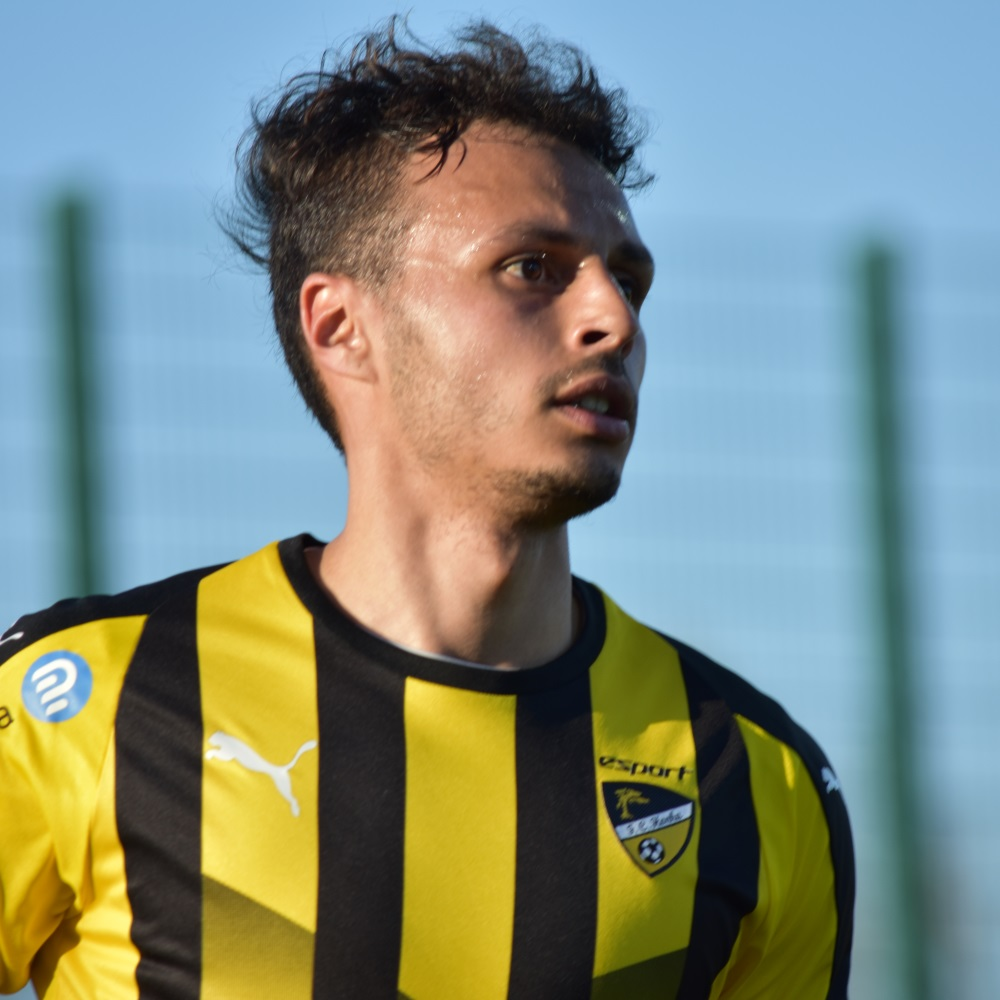
- Rahimi with Honka in 2018

Personal information
- Date of birth: 13 February 1995 (age 31)
- Place of birth: Helsinki, Finland
- Height: 1.73 m (5 ft 8 in)
- Position: Forward

Youth career
- HJK

Senior career*
Years	Team	Apps	(Gls)
2010–2011	Klubi 04	10	(1)
2012–2014	Honka	33	(2)
2014	→ Pallohonka	21	(10)
2014	→ Pallohonka	3	(1)
2015	HIFK	25	(1)
2016–2017	SJK	15	(1)
2017	Ilves	21	(3)
2018	Honka	27	(3)
2019–2020	RoPS	34	(6)
2021	Brattvåg	0	(0)
2022	PK-35	9	(0)

International career^{‡}
2010–2011	Finland U-17	4	(1)
2012	Finland U-19	3	(0)
2014–2015	Finland U-21	6	(0)
- * Club domestic league appearances and goals as of 13 May 2021 ‡ National team caps and goals as of 11 February 2016

Youness Rahimi (born 13 February 1995) is a Finnish former professional football player.

== Career ==
Rahimi played in the youth sector of HJK Helsinki. He also spent time on trial with Tottenham.

=== Club ===
Rahimi made his league debut on 9 July 2012 with FC Honka against TPS. On 19 October 2012, he scored his first league goal against KuPS.

In December 2015, Rahimi signed with SJK, where he would go on to help his team secure third place in the 2016 season. For the 2017 season, Rahimi played at Ilves Tampere.

He got his first stint abroad in May 2021 when he signed for Norwegian third-tier side Brattvåg IL.

=== International ===
Rahimi has represented Finland at youth and under-21 level.

=== Personal life ===
Rahimi has also a dual Moroccan citizenship.

== Career statistics ==
As of match played 19 July 2016

Appearances and goals by club, season and competition
Club	Season	League			Cup		League cup		Europa		Total	
Club	Season	Division	Apps	Goals	Apps	Goals	Apps	Goals	Apps	Goals	Apps	Goals
Klubi-04	2011	Kakkonen	10	1	0	0	–		–		10	1
Honka	2012	Veikkausliiga	7	1	0	0	0	0	–		7	1
Honka	2013	Veikkausliiga	19	1	2	0	4	2	–		25	3
Honka	2014	Veikkausliiga	7	0	1	0	1	0	0	0	9	0
Honka	Total		33	2	3	0	5	2	0	0	41	4
Pallohonka (loan)	2012	Kakkonen	21	10	0	0	–		–		21	10
Pallohonka (loan)	2014	Kakkonen	3	1	0	0	–		–		3	1
Pallohonka (loan)	Total		24	11	0	0	0	0	0	0	24	11
HIFK	2015	Veikkausliiga	25	1	2	0	4	1	–		31	2
SJK	2016	Veikkausliiga	13	1	3	1	3	0	2	0	21	2
Ilves	2017	Veikkausliiga	21	3	7	3	–		–		28	6
Honka	2018	Veikkausliiga	27	3	5	6	–		–		32	9
RoPS	2019	Veikkausliiga	25	5	0	0	–		2	0	27	5
RoPS	2020	Veikkausliiga	9	1	1	0	–		–		10	1
RoPS	Total		34	6	1	0	0	0	2	0	37	6
Brattvåg	2021	2. divisjon	0	0	0	0	–		–		0	0
PK-35	2022	Ykkönen	9	0	0	0	–		–		9	0
Career total			196	28	21	10	12	3	4	0	233	41
