= Jagoba Beobide =

Spanish footballer (born 1987)

Personal information
- Full name: Jagoba Beobide Larrañaga
- Date of birth: 19 February 1987 (age 39)
- Place of birth: Azpeitia, Spain
- Height: 1.77 m (5 ft 9 1/2 in)
- Position: Midfielder

Youth career
- UPV

Senior career*
Years	Team	Apps	(Gls)
2006–2008	Real Sociedad B	66	(0)
2008–2010	Real Unión	60	(0)
2010–2011	Córdoba	13	(0)
2011–2012	Real Unión	30	(0)
2012–2016	Alavés	97	(2)
2017	Racing Santander	9	(0)
2017–2019	Burgos	57	(0)
2019	RoPS	10	(0)
2020–2024	Real Unión	93	(1)
- * Club domestic league appearances and goals as of 25 May 2024

Jagoba Beobide Larrañaga (born 19 February 1987) is a Spanish professional footballer who plays as a midfielder.

== Club career ==
Born in Azpeitia, Gipuzkoa, Beobide spent his first three seasons as a senior in the Segunda División B, with Real Sociedad B and Real Unión. He achieved promotion with the latter club at the end of 2008–09, contributing 27 matches to the feat.

Beobide made his professional debut in the Segunda División on 12 September 2009, coming on as a second-half substitute in the 1–1 home draw against FC Cartagena. He added a further 32 appearances during the campaign, which ended in immediate relegation.

In the summer of 2010, Beobide signed a one-year contract with Córdoba CF in the same league. He returned to the third division one year later, going on to represent Real Unión and Deportivo Alavés and achieving another promotion as starter.

Beobide scored the first of only four career league goals on 3 November 2013, in a 2–2 home draw with CD Tenerife. He started 2014–15 on the sidelines due to an abdominal injury, and thus featured sparingly under Alberto López. He won his second promotion with the Basque side in the 2015–16 season, playing 16 games for the champions in the process.

Beobide competed in the third tier the following years, at the service of Racing de Santander and Burgos CF. On 30 July 2019, the 32-year-old moved abroad for the first time in his career, agreeing to a deal at Rovaniemen Palloseura of the Finnish Veikkausliiga.

On 23 January 2020, Beobide returned to Real Unión for a third spell.

== Honours ==
Alavés

- Segunda División: 2015–16
- Segunda División B: 2012–13
