= Juhani Kangas =

Finnish footballer (born 1998)

Personal information
- Date of birth: 27 April 1998 (age 28)
- Position: Goalkeeper

Senior career*
Years	Team	Apps	(Gls)
2015	FC Santa Claus	2	(0)
2015–2016	RoPS	1	(0)
2016	→ FC Santa Claus (loan)	2	(0)
- * Club domestic league appearances and goals

Juhani Kangas (born 27 April 1998) is a Finnish former professional footballer who played as a goalkeeper.
