= Tommi Jäntti =

Finnish footballer (born 2000)

Personal information
- Date of birth: 7 March 2000 (age 26)
- Place of birth: Helsinki, Finland
- Height: 1.79 m (5 ft 10 in)
- Position: Midfielder

Youth career
- 2008–2017: HJK

Senior career*
Years	Team	Apps	(Gls)
2017–2018	Klubi 04	48	(10)
2018	HJK	0	(0)
2019–2020	RoPS II	6	(0)
2019–2020	RoPS	26	(1)
2021	Klubi 04	23	(2)
2022	Gnistan	14	(2)
2023–2024	Lahti	42	(2)

International career^{‡}
2015	Finland U15	2	(0)
2016	Finland U16	3	(0)
2016–2017	Finland U17	11	(2)
2017–2018	Finland U18	4	(0)
2018	Finland U19	3	(0)
- * Club domestic league appearances and goals as of 27 October 2024 ‡ National team caps and goals as of 22 January 2024

Tommi Jäntti (born 7 March 2000) is a Finnish professional footballer who plays as a midfielder.

== Career ==
Jäntti played in the youth sector and the youth academy of HJK Helsinki. He also represented HJK youth in the 2018–19 UEFA Youth League, scoring one goal in two matches against Altınordu youth.

He played for HJK's reserve team Klubi 04 in third-tier Kakkonen and second-tier Ykkönen, but without making a single appearance for the first team, he left the club at the end of 2018, and joined Rovaniemen Palloseura (RoPS) in Veikkausliiga. Jäntti debuted in the league in 2019, and represented RoPS in 2019–20 UEFA Europa League qualifiers, scoring a goal against Aberdeen.

For the 2021 season, he returned to Klubi 04, playing in Ykkönen.

On 13 January 2022, Jäntti signed with fellow Ykkönen club IF Gnistan.

On 10 January 2023, he moved to Lahti and joined FC Lahti in Veikkausliiga on a one-year deal, reuniting with his former coach Mikko Mannila. After the season, Lahti exercised their option and Jäntti's contract was extended for the 2024 season.

== International career ==
Jäntti has represented Finland at various youth international levels.
