= Kalle Katz =

Finnish footballer (born 2000)

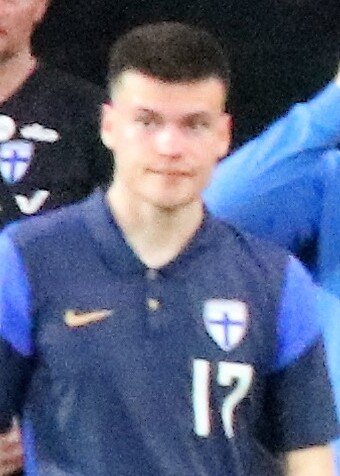
- Katz in 2022

Personal information
- Date of birth: 4 January 2000 (age 26)
- Height: 1.85 m (6 ft 1 in)
- Position: Centre back

Team information
- Current team: EIF
- Number: 5

Youth career
- Käpylän Pallo
- –2017: HJK

Senior career*
Years	Team	Apps	(Gls)
2017–2021	Klubi 04	41	(1)
2017–2020	HJK	1	(0)
2019	→ RoPS (loan)	17	(0)
2020	→ RoPS (loan)	17	(0)
2021–2023	Ilves	44	(0)
2024–	EIF	19	(0)

International career
2016–2017	Finland U17	12	(0)
2017	Finland U18	2	(0)
2017–2018	Finland U19	4	(0)
2019	Finland U21	3	(0)
- * Club domestic league appearances and goals as of 28 October 2023

Kalle Katz (born 4 January 2000) is a Finnish football player for EIF.

== Club career ==
He made his Veikkausliiga debut for HJK on 28 July 2018 in a game against Honka, as a starter.

On 7 January 2019, Katz was loaned out for the 2019 season to RoPS. On 10 March 2020, he re-joined RoPS on loan for the rest of the year.

On 15 January 2021, Katz signed for Ilves.

On 24 February 2024, Katz joined newly promoted Veikkausliiga club EIF.

== International ==
He was included in the Finland U19 squad for 2018 UEFA European Under-19 Championship, but did not appear in any games.

== Personal life ==
Katz is of Jewish descent. Finnish track and field athlete and Olympic gold medalist Elias Katz was his great-grandfather's cousin. His younger brother Bruno is also a footballer.
