= Sampo Ala =

Finnish footballer (born 2002)

Personal information
- Full name: Sampo Ala
- Date of birth: 18 January 2002 (age 24)
- Place of birth: Finland
- Height: 1.84 m (6 ft 0 in)
- Position: Forward

Team information
- Current team: RoPS
- Number: 24

Youth career
- RoPS

Senior career*
Years	Team	Apps	(Gls)
2018–	RoPS	25	(1)
2019–	RoPS II	41	(11)

International career^{‡}
2018	Finland U16	3	(0)
2018–2019	Finland U17	7	(2)
2019–	Finland U18	2	(1)
- * Club domestic league appearances and goals as of 29 August 2021 ‡ National team caps and goals as of 19 November 2019

Sampo Ala (born 18 January 2002) is a Finnish professional footballer who plays as a forward for Ykkönen club Rovaniemen Palloseura.

== Club career ==
A youth academy product of RoPS, Ala made his senior debut on 10 March 2018 in a 2–0 defeat against KuPS. He made his Veikkausliiga debut on 3 April 2019 in a 2–2 draw against KuPS and scored an injury time equaliser.

== International career ==
Ala is a Finnish youth international.

== Career statistics ==
=== Club ===
As of 14 August 2020

Club	Season	League			Cup		Other		Total	
Club	Season	Division	Apps	Goals	Apps	Goals	Apps	Goals	Apps	Goals
RoPS	2018	Veikkausliiga	0	0	1	0	—		1	0
RoPS	2019	Veikkausliiga	8	1	5	1	0	0	13	2
RoPS	2020	Veikkausliiga	7	0	4	0	—		11	0
Career total			15	1	10	1	0	0	25	2
