= Sergio Llamas =

Spanish footballer

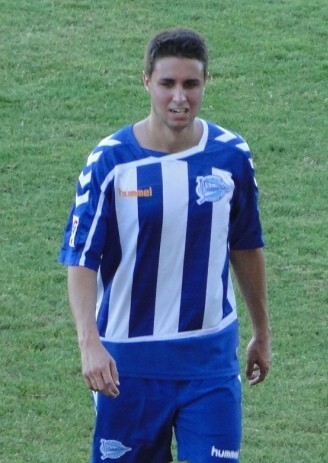
- Llamas with Alavés in 2016

Personal information
- Full name: Sergio Llamas Pardo
- Date of birth: 6 March 1993 (age 33)
- Place of birth: Vitoria-Gasteiz, Spain
- Height: 1.78 m (5 ft 10 in)
- Position: Midfielder

Team information
- Current team: Mumbai City
- Number: 8

Youth career
- Alavés

Senior career*
Years	Team	Apps	(Gls)
2012–2017	Alavés B	49	(7)
2012–2018	Alavés	37	(3)
2017–2018	→ Real Unión (loan)	25	(1)
2019–2020	RoPs	9	(1)
2020–2021	Real Unión	15	(5)
2022–2023	Rayo Majadahonda	26	(0)
2023–2024	Guabirá	13	(1)
2024–2025	Gokulam Kerala	20	(1)
2025–2026	Gravina	16	(0)
2026	Inter Kashi	13	(1)
2026–	Mumbai City	1	(1)
- * Club domestic league appearances and goals as of 06:30, 23 August 2026 (UTC)

Sergio Llamas Pardo (born 6 March 1993) is a Spanish professional footballer who plays as a midfielder for Indian Super League club Mumbai City.

== Club career ==
Born in Vitoria-Gasteiz, Álava, Llamas finished his formation with Deportivo Alavés, and made his senior debuts with the reserves in the 2012–13 campaign. On 16 September 2012 he made his senior debut, coming on as a late substitute in a 1–0 win at CD Teruel.

On 20 August 2014 Llamas was definitely promoted to the main squad in Segunda División. Four days later he made his debut as a professional, starting in a 1–1 draw at CD Leganés.

On 18 March 2015 Llamas scored his first professional goal, netting the second in a 3–0 home win against CA Osasuna. He scored two goals in 19 appearances during the 2015–16 campaign, as his side achieved promotion to La Liga.

On 10 August 2016, Llamas signed a new three-year deal with the Basque side. The following 31 January, however, after failing to play a single minute during the first half of the campaign, he returned to the reserve side.

On 15 August 2017, Llamas was loaned to Segunda División B side Real Unión, for one year. The following 28 July he terminated his contract with Alavés.

On 5 February 2019, Llamas joined RoPs on a contract for the rest of 2019.

On 7 July 2024, Llamas was announced at Gokulam Kerala, joining an Indian club for the first time.

On 23 August 2026, following a stint at Inter Kashi, Llamas joined fellow Indian Super League side Mumbai City. He scored on his debut against Churchill Brothers on 12 October, netting a stoppage-time penalty in a 2-1 loss.

== Honours ==
Alavés

- Segunda División: 2015–16
