= Tarik Kada =

Dutch-Moroccan footballer

Personal information
- Full name: Tarik Kada
- Date of birth: 26 May 1996 (age 30)
- Place of birth: Nador, Morocco
- Height: 1.70 m (5 ft 7 in)
- Position: Winger

Youth career
- Zeburgia 1919
- SC Heerenveen

Senior career*
Years	Team	Apps	(Gls)
2015–2016	SC Heerenveen	3	(0)
2016–2018	Heracles Almelo	21	(0)
2017–2018	→ FC Eindhoven (loan)	18	(0)
2019	RoPs	13	(0)
2020–2021	Al-Ahli		
2021–2022	Al-Hidd		
2022	Bisha	0	(0)

International career
2013	Netherlands U17	2	(0)
2013	Netherlands U18	1	(0)
2014–2015	Netherlands U19	8	(0)
2015	Netherlands U20	2	(0)
- * Club domestic league appearances and goals as of 23:41, 31 May 2019 (UTC)

Tarik Kada (born 26 May 1996) is a Dutch-Moroccan professional footballer who plays as a winger. He formerly played for Heerenveen and Eindhoven.
