= 2021 HJK season =

HJK
2021 season
- Chairman: Olli-Pekka Lyytikäinen
- Manager: Toni Koskela
- Stadium: Bolt Arena
- Veikkausliiga: 1st (champions)
- Finnish Cup: Runners-up
- UEFA Champions League: Second qualifying round
- UEFA Europa League: Play-off round
- UEFA Europa Conference League: Group stage
- Top goalscorer: League: Roope Riski; Filip Valenčič; Jair (6 each); All: Roope Riski (20 goals)
Home colours	Away colours

The 2021 season was Helsingin Jalkapalloklubi's 113th competitive season.

== Season events ==
On 30 November, HJK announced the signing of Anthony Olusanya from FF Jaro on a two-year contract, with the option of a third.

On 19 January, Joel Untersee signed a one-year contract with HJK.

On 23 February, HJK announced the signing of Luís Henrique on a season-long loan deal from Vejle.

On 3 March, HJK announced the season-long loan signing of Dieudonné Gaucho Debohi from SOL FC, with an option to make the move permanent.

On 21 March, Logan Rogerson signed for HJK on a one-year contract, with the option of another two years, from Auckland City.

On 4 April, HJK announced the signing of Janne Saksela on a one-year contract, with the option of a second, from Ilves.

On 20 April, Dylan Murnane joined HJK on a short-term contract until July after impressing on trial. The following day, Sebastian Dahlström returned to HJK on a one-year contract having left Sheriff Tiraspol earlier in the year.

On 25 April, Enoch Banza moved to Raufoss.

On 21 June, Atomu Tanaka extended his contract with HJK until the end of the 2022 season.

On 28 June, Miro Tenho extended his contract with HJK until the end of the 2023 season.

On 17 July, HJK announced the signing of Marcello Beuker from Heerenveen on a contract until the end of the 2021 season.

On 22 July, Tim Sparv signed for HJK on a contract until the end of the 2022 season. The following day, 23 July, Joel Untersee left HJK by mutual consent.

On 4 August, HJK announced the signing of Santeri Hostikka from Pogoń Szczecin on a contract until the end of 2022. The following day, 5 August, HJK announced the signing of Taddeus Nkeng from Olimpik Donetsk on a contract until the end of 2022, with Baba Mensah signing on a contract until the end of the season, with the option of an additional season, from Ilves on 6 August.

On 16 August, HJK announced the signing of Patrik Raitanen on a contract until the end of the season. Whilst on the same day HJK also announced that Dylan Murnane had been released by the club, Logan Rogerson had joined Haka on loan and Luís Henrique's loan had been ended early.

== Squad ==
As of match played 9 December 2021

No.	Name	Nationality	Position	Date of birth (age)	Signed from	Signed in	Contract ends	Apps.	Goals
Goalkeepers
12	Jakob Tånnander	(Sweden)	GK	10 August 2000 (aged 21)	Malmö	2020	2021	16	0
31	Hugo Keto	(Finland)	GK	9 February 1998 (aged 23)	Brighton & Hove Albion	2020	2021(+1)	40	0
45	Elmo Henriksson	(Finland)	GK	10 March 2003 (aged 18)	Academy	2021		0	0
Defenders
3	Janne Saksela	(Finland)	DF	14 March 1993 (aged 28)	Ilves	2021	2021(+1)	27	2
4	Markus Halsti	(Finland)	DF	19 March 1984 (aged 37)	Esbjerg fB	2020	2021	19	1
5	Daniel O'Shaughnessy	(Finland)	DF	14 September 1994 (aged 27)	Cheltenham Town	2018	2021	118	9
13	Luis Carlos Murillo	(Colombia)	DF	16 October 1990 (aged 31)	KuPS	2020	2021	68	0
15	Miro Tenho	(Finland)	DF	2 April 1995 (aged 26)	Inter Turku	2020	2023	63	4
16	Valtteri Moren	(Finland)	DF	15 June 1991 (aged 30)	Waasland-Beveren	2020	2022	162	9
22	Kevin Kouassivi-Benissan	(Finland)	DF	25 January 1999 (aged 22)	Klubi 04	2018	2021(+1)	28	0
Midfields
6	Jair	(Brazil)	MF	3 August 1994 (aged 27)	Ilves	2021		36	10
8	Bubacar Djaló	(Portugal)	MF	2 February 1997 (aged 24)	Sporting CP B	2020	2020(+2)	39	0
9	Riku Riski	(Finland)	MF	16 August 1989 (aged 32)	Odd	2018	2021	136	34
10	Lucas Lingman	(Finland)	MF	25 January 1998 (aged 23)	RoPS	2020	2021(+1)	102	4
14	Sebastian Dahlström	(Finland)	MF	5 November 1996 (aged 25)	Unattached	2021	2021	157	16
19	Casper Terho	(Finland)	MF	24 June 2003 (aged 18)	Klubi 04	2020		21	2
20	Tim Sparv	(Finland)	MF	20 February 1987 (aged 34)	Unattached	2021	2022	9	0
21	Santeri Väänänen	(Finland)	MF	1 January 2002 (aged 19)	Klubi 04	2018	2021	49	1
27	Filip Valenčič	(Slovenia)	MF	7 January 1992 (aged 29)	Inter Turku	2021		90	26
37	Atomu Tanaka	(Japan)	MF	4 October 1987 (aged 34)	Cerezo Osaka	2020	2022	154	35
47	Matti Peltola	(Finland)	MF	3 July 2002 (aged 19)	Klubi 04	2019	2022	30	1
71	Dieudonné Gaucho Debohi	(Ivory Coast)	MF	15 January 2001 (aged 20)	loan from SOL FC	2021	2021	1	0
Forwards
7	Santeri Hostikka	(Finland)	FW	30 September 1997 (aged 24)	Pogoń Szczecin	2021	2022	17	1
11	Roope Riski	(Finland)	FW	16 August 1991 (aged 30)	SKN St. Pölten	2020	2021(+1)	73	38
17	Taddeus Nkeng	(Cameroon)	FW	26 February 2000 (aged 21)	Olimpik Donetsk	2021	2022	2	0
24	David Browne	(Papua New Guinea)	FW	27 December 1995 (aged 25)	Auckland City	2020	2022	63	10
29	Anthony Olusanya	(Finland)	FW	1 February 2000 (aged 21)	FF Jaro	2021	2022(+1)	26	4
Klubi 04
41	Samuel Anini Junior	(Finland)	FW	7 September 2002 (aged 19)	PK Keski-Uusimaa	2019	2021	0	0
42	Kai Meriluoto	(Finland)	FW	2 January 2003 (aged 18)	Klubi 04	2020		3	1
51	Rico Finnäs	(Finland)	FW	14 October 2000 (aged 21)	Klubi 04	2020		1	0
57	Joose Mäkinen	(Finland)	DF	11 February 2003 (aged 17)	Jazz	2020	2022 (+1)	0	0
79	Matias Niemelä	(Finland)	GK	15 March 2002 (aged 19)	Klubi 04	2020		0	0
	Patrik Raitanen	(Finland)	DF	13 June 2001 (aged 20)	Unattached	2021	2021	0	0
	Baba Mensah	(Ghana)	DF	20 August 1994 (aged 27)	Ilves	2021	2021(+1)	0	0
	Marcello Beuker	(Netherlands)	DF	26 March 2000 (aged 21)	Heerenveen	2021	2021	0	0
Away on loan
17	Logan Rogerson	(New Zealand)	MF	28 May 1998 (aged 23)	Auckland City	2021	2021(+2)	0	0
88	Pyry Hannola	(Finland)	MF	21 October 2001 (aged 20)	Midtjylland	2020		7	0
Left during the season
7	Luís Henrique	(Brazil)	FW	17 March 1998 (aged 23)	loan from Vejle	2021	2021	16	3
18	Dylan Murnane	(Australia)	DF	18 January 1995 (aged 26)	IFK Mariehamn	2021	2021	9	0
20	Enoch Banza	(Finland)	FW	4 February 2000 (aged 21)	Klubi 04	2017	2021	19	1
33	Joel Untersee	(Switzerland)	DF	11 February 1994 (aged 27)	Unattached	2021	2021	4	0

=== On loan ===
Note: Flags indicate national team as defined under FIFA eligibility rules; some limited exceptions apply. Players may hold more than one non-FIFA nationality.

No. / Pos. / Nation / Player; 17 / MF / NZL / Logan Rogerson (at Haka until the end of the 2021 season)	No. / Pos. / Nation / Player; 88 / MF / FIN / Pyry Hannola (at SJK until the end of the 2021 season)

=== Left the club during the season ===
Note: Flags indicate national team as defined under FIFA eligibility rules; some limited exceptions apply. Players may hold more than one non-FIFA nationality.

No.	Pos.	Nation	Player
7	FW	BRA	Luís Henrique (loan return to Vejle)
18	DF	AUS	Dylan Murnane

No.	Pos.	Nation	Player
20	FW	FIN	Enoch Banza (to Raufoss)
33	DF	SUI	Joel Untersee

== Transfers ==
=== In ===
Date	Position	Nationality	Name	From	Fee	Ref.
30 November 2020†	FW	(Finland)	Anthony Olusanya	FF Jaro	Undisclosed	
1 January 2021	MF	(Brazil)	Jair	Ilves	Undisclosed	
1 January 2021	MF	(Slovenia)	Filip Valenčič	Inter Turku	Undisclosed	
19 January 2021	DF	(Switzerland)	Joel Untersee	Unattached	Free	
21 March 2021	MF	(New Zealand)	Logan Rogerson	Auckland City	Undisclosed	
4 April 2021	DF	(Finland)	Janne Saksela	Ilves	Undisclosed	
20 April 2021	DF	(Australia)	Dylan Murnane	IFK Mariehamn	Undisclosed	
21 April 2021	MF	(Finland)	Sebastian Dahlström	Unattached	Free	
17 July 2021	DF	(Netherlands)	Marcello Beuker	Heerenveen	Undisclosed	
22 July 2021	MF	(Finland)	Tim Sparv	Unattached	Free	
4 August 2021	FW	(Finland)	Santeri Hostikka	Pogoń Szczecin	Undisclosed	
5 August 2021	FW	(Cameroon)	Taddeus Nkeng	Olimpik Donetsk	Undisclosed	
6 August 2021	DF	(Ghana)	Baba Mensah	Ilves	Undisclosed	
16 August 2021	DF	(Finland)	Patrik Raitanen	Unattached	Free	

† Transfers announced on the above date, being finalised on 1 January 2020.

=== Loans in ===
Start date	Position	Nationality	Name	From	End date	Ref.
23 February 2021	FW	(Brazil)	Luís Henrique	Vejle	16 August 2021	
3 March 2021	MF	(Ivory Coast)	Dieudonné Gaucho Debohi	SOL FC	End of season	

=== Out ===
Date	Position	Nationality	Name	To	Fee	Ref.
24 January 2021	FW	(Finland)	Eetu Vertainen	Ilves	Undisclosed	
25 April 2021	FW	(Finland)	Enoch Banza	Raufoss	Undisclosed	

=== Loans out ===
Start date	Position	Nationality	Name	To	End date	Ref.
2021	MF	(Finland)	Pyry Hannola	SJK	End of season	
21 March 2021	MF	(New Zealand)	Logan Rogerson	Haka	End of season	

=== Released ===
Date	Position	Nationality	Name	Joined	Date	Ref.
23 July 2021	DF	(Switzerland)	Joel Untersee			
31 July 2021	DF	(Australia)	Dylan Murnane	Newcastle Jets	19 August 2021	
10 December 2021	MF	(Finland)	Sebastian Dahlström	KuPS	10 December 2021	
20 December 2021	MF	(Finland)	Tim Sparv	Retired		
31 December 2021	GK	(Finland)	Hugo Keto	Sandefjord	24 January 2022	
31 December 2021	DF	(Finland)	Markus Halsti	SexyPöxyt		
31 December 2021	DF	(Finland)	Joose Mäkinen	Salon Palloilijat		
31 December 2021	DF	(Finland)	Daniel O'Shaughnessy	Karlsruher SC		
31 December 2021	DF	(Ghana)	Baba Mensah	IFK Mariehamn		
31 December 2021	DF	(Netherlands)	Marcello Beuker	Kokkolan Palloveikot		
31 December 2021	MF	(New Zealand)	Logan Rogerson	Haka		
31 December 2021	FW	(Cameroon)	Taddeus Nkeng			

== Friendlies ==
	–
EEST (UTC+3)

== Competitions ==
=== Veikkausliiga ===
==== Regular season ====
===== Results summary =====
Overall								Home						Away					
Pld	W	D	L	GF	GA	GD	Pts	W	D	L	GF	GA	GD	W	D	L	GF	GA	GD
22	15	4	3	32	12	+20	49	7	2	2	17	8	+9	8	2	1	15	4	+11

Last updated: 26 September 2021.
Source: See Results

===== Results by matchday =====
Round	1	2	3	4	5	6	7	8	9	10	11	12	13	14	15	16	17	18	19	20	21	22
Ground	H	A	A	H	A	H	A	A	H	H	A	A	H	H	A	H	A	H	A	A	H	H
Result	W	D	W	W	W	W	W	W	W	W	W	L	W	D	W	W	W	D	W	D	L	L

Updated to match(es) played on 26 September 2021. Source: See Results
A = Away; H = Home; W = Win; D = Draw; L = Loss

===== Results =====
24 April 2021 8	HJK	4 – 2	Honka	Helsinki
15:00 EEST (UTC+3)	Valenčič 42'; Browne 53'; Dahlström (yellow card) 56'; Ro.Riski 78'; Terho 90+2'	Report	D.Smith 7'; Hatakka (yellow card) 39'; Dongou 71'; Kaufmann (yellow card) 76'; Tammilehto (yellow card) 88'	Stadium: Bolt Arena; Referee: Oskari Hämäläinen

2 May 2021 5	KuPS	0 – 0	HJK	Kuopio
18:30 EEST (UTC+3)	A.Popovitch (yellow card) 29'	Report	O'Shaughnessy (yellow card) 16'; Djaló (yellow card) 47'; Tenho (yellow card) 57'	Stadium: Kuopio Football Stadium; Referee: Mohammad Al Emara

11 May 2021 6	Ilves	0 – 3	HJK	Tampere
18:30 EEST (UTC+3)	P.Loa (yellow card) 22'; Siira (yellow card) 33'; Katz (yellow card) 46'; Mömmö (yellow card) 77'	Report	O'Shaughnessy 8'; Lingman 25'; Terho 30'	Stadium: Tammelan Stadion; Referee: Ville Nevalainen

17 May 2021 7	HJK	2 – 0	Lahti	Helsinki
18:30 EEST (UTC+3)	Murillo (yellow card) 6'; Ro.Riski (yellow card) 25' (goal) 90'; Ri.Riski (yellow card) 41' (goal) 67'; Moren (yellow card) 64'	Report	Chinedu (yellow card) 59'	Stadium: Bolt Arena; Referee: Oliver Reitala

22 May 2021 8	SJK	0 – 2	HJK	Seinäjoki
17:00 EEST (UTC+3)	Arthur (yellow card) 63'	Report	Moren (yellow card) 62'; Djaló (yellow card) 88'; Tenho 90+2'; Olusanya 90+4'	Stadium: OmaSP Stadion; Referee: Dennis Antamo

28 May 2021 9	HJK	3 – 1	Oulu	Helsinki
18:00 EEST (UTC+3)	Valenčič 14'; Henrique 58', 60'	Report	M.Koskela 72'; Hurme (yellow card) 79'	Stadium: Bolt Arena; Referee: Joni Hyytiä

10 June 2021 10	Haka	1 – 2	HJK	Valkeakoski
18:30 EEST (UTC+3)	H.Malundama (yellow card) 43'; S.Chidi (yellow card) 55'; Friberg (yellow card) 68'; Yartey 72'; Loen (yellow card) 86'	Report	Keto (yellow card) 20'; Browne 53'; Henrique 61'	Stadium: Tehtaan kenttä Referee: Mattias Gestranius

14 June 2021 1	IFK Mariehamn	0 – 1	HJK	Mariehamn
18:30 EEST (UTC+3)	Henrique (yellow card) 85'	Report	Ro.Riski 67'	Stadium: Wiklöf Holding Arena; Referee: Dennis Antamo

18 June 2021 14	HJK	2 – 1	Ilves	Helsinki
18:00 EEST (UTC+3)	Valenčič 8'; Jair 67'	Report	Murnane 35' (o.g.); Siira (yellow card) 45+1'; Katz (yellow card) 65'	Stadium: Bolt Arena; Referee: Joni Hyytiä

24 June 2021 11	HJK	2 – 0	KTP	Helsinki
18:30 EEST (UTC+3)	Ro.Riski 39'; Tenho (yellow card) 62'; Olusanya 68'	Report	Laaksonen (yellow card) 83'	Stadium: Bolt Arena; Referee: Petri Viljanen

30 June 2021 12	HIFK	0 – 1	HJK	Helsinki
18:30 EEST (UTC+3)	Hing-Glover (red card) 49'; Bäckman (yellow card) 53'; Yaghoubi (yellow card) 64'; Dunwoody (yellow card) 90'	Report	Valenčič 40'; Tanaka (yellow card) 72'; Jair (yellow card) 78'; Ri.Riski (yellow card) 87'	Stadium: Bolt Arena; Referee: Antti Munukka

17 July 2021 13	Oulu	2 – 1	HJK	Oulu
18:30 EEST (UTC+3)	Salanović 8'; S.Alanko (yellow card) 42'; Fillion (yellow card) 71'; Opara 77'	Report	Murnane (yellow card) 31'; Jair (yellow card) 41'; Peltola (yellow card) 45+1'; Tanaka 75'; Browne (yellow card) 78'	Stadium: Raatti Stadium; Referee: Ville Nevalainen

24 July 2021 16	HJK	2 – 0	Haka	Helsinki
17:00 EEST (UTC+3)	Jair 2'; Valenčič 27'; Luís Henrique (yellow card) 86'	Report		Stadium: Bolt Arena; Referee: Dennis Antamo

31 July 2021 17	HJK	0 – 0	SJK	Helsinki
17:00 EEST (UTC+3)	Ro.Riski (yellow card) 28'; Peltola (yellow card) 79'	Report	Murilo (yellow card) 22'; Håkans (yellow card) 43'; Jervis (yellow card) 88'	Stadium: Bolt Arena; Referee: Oskari Hämäläinen

7 August 2021 18	KTP	0 – 1	HJK	Kotka
17:00 EEST (UTC+3)	Sissoko (yellow card) 67'; R.Finnäs (yellow card) 67'	Report	Valenčič 23' (pen.); Tenho (yellow card) 74'	Stadium: Arto Tolsa Areena; Referee: Ville Nevalainen

15 August 2021 19	HJK	1 – 0	IFK Mariehamn	Helsinki
15:00 EEST (UTC+3)	A.Olusanya 65'	Report	Okoye (yellow card) 90+2'	Stadium: Bolt Arena; Referee: Oliver Reitala

23 August 2021 20	Lahti	0 – 1	HJK	Lahti
18:30 EEST (UTC+3)	K.Yli-Hietanen (yellow card) 45+4'	Report	Browne 7'; Olusanya (yellow card) 43'; Peltola (yellow card) 47'; Jair (yellow card) 53'; Djaló (yellow card) 60'; Murillo (yellow card) 76'	Stadium: Lahti Stadium; Referee: Antti Munukka

29 August 2021 21	HJK	1 – 1	KuPS	Helsinki
18:39 EEST (UTC+3)	Ro.Riski (yellow card) 60'; Tenho (yellow card) 65'; Jair 86'	Report	Sebban (yellow card) 6'; Paulo Ricardo (yellow card) 29'; Rangel (yellow card) 39'; Nissilä 43'	Stadium: Bolt Arena; Referee: Dennis Antamo

11 September 2021 22	Inter Turku	1 – 3	HJK	Turku
17:00 EEST (UTC+3)	Forsell 22'; Furuholm (yellow card) 30'; Kako (yellow card) 80'	Report	Lingman 7'; Browne 27'; Jair 35'; Keto (yellow card) 82'; Djaló (yellow card) 90+1'	Stadium: Veritas Stadion; Referee: Mohammad Al Emara

19 September 2021 2	Honka	0 – 0	HJK	Espoo
15:00 EEST (UTC+3)	Aalto (yellow card) 49'	Report	Murillo (yellow card) 56'; Hostikka (yellow card) 62'; Peltola (yellow card) 82'	Stadium: Tapiolan urheilupuisto Referee: Oliver Reitala

22 September 2021 4	HJK	0 – 2	HIFK	Helsinki
18:30 EEST (UTC+3)	Hostikka (yellow card) 23'; Jair (yellow card) 45+3'	Report	Kamara 32', 71'; Bäckman (yellow card) 45+3'; Yaghoubi (yellow card) 61'; Mattila (yellow card) 74'; Ali (yellow card) 84'	Stadium: Bolt Arena; Referee: Mohammad Al Emara

26 September 2021 3	HJK	0 – 1	Inter Turku	Helsinki
18:30 EEST (UTC+3)	Terho (yellow card) 90+3'	Report	Forsell 69' (pen.); Järvenpää (yellow card) 75'	Stadium: Bolt Arena; Referee: Dennis Antamo

===== Table =====
Pos	Team	Pld	W	D	L	GF	GA	GD	Pts	Qualification
1	KuPS	22	15	4	3	38	14	+24	49	Qualification for the Championship round
2	HJK	22	15	4	3	32	12	+20	49	Qualification for the Championship round
3	Inter Turku	22	12	3	7	36	22	+14	39	Qualification for the Championship round
4	SJK	22	11	4	7	29	24	+5	37	Qualification for the Championship round
5	HIFK	22	9	6	7	23	23	0	33	Qualification for the Championship round

Source: Flashscore
Rules for classification: 1) Points; 2) Goal difference; 3) Goals scored; 4) Head-to-head points; 5) Head-to-head goal difference; 6) Head-to-head away goals scored; 7) Play-off
(Note: Play-off is only played if need to decide champion, teams for relegation or UEFA competition and will be played on a neutral ground).

==== Championship round ====
===== Results summary =====
Overall								Home						Away					
Pld	W	D	L	GF	GA	GD	Pts	W	D	L	GF	GA	GD	W	D	L	GF	GA	GD
5	3	1	1	9	7	+2	10	2	0	1	5	4	+1	1	1	0	4	3	+1

Last updated: 31 October 2021.
Source: See Results

===== Results by matchday =====
Round	1	2	3	4	5
Ground	H	A	H	H	A
Result	L	W	W	W	D

Updated to match(es) played on 31 October 2021. Source: See Results
A = Away; H = Home; W = Win; D = Draw; L = Loss

===== Results =====
3 October 2021 23	HJK	2 – 3	SJK	Helsinki
18:30 EEST (UTC+3)	Browne 4'; Hostikka 82'; Ro.Riski (yellow card) 85'	Report	Boxall (yellow card) 56'; Valencia 73' (yellow card) 73'; Oliynyk 86' (pen.); Ngueukam 90+5'	Stadium: Bolt Arena; Referee: Dennis Antamo

16 October 2021 24	Ilves	2 – 3	HJK	Tampere
15:00 EEST (UTC+3)	Murillo 2' (o.g.); Siira (yellow card) 37'; Manga (yellow card) 46'; Ollila 83'; P.Loa Loa (yellow card) 90+3'	Report	Moren 14'; Jair 45+3', 47'	Stadium: Tammelan Stadion; Referee: Joni Hyytiä

24 October 2021 25	HJK	2 – 1	Inter Turku	Helsinki
18:30 EEST (UTC+3)	Ri.Riski 37'; Ro.Riski 54'; Murillo (yellow card) 73'	Report	Furuholm 74'	Stadium: Bolt Arena; Referee: Oliver Reitala

27 October 2021 26	HJK	1 – 0	HIFK	Helsinki
18:30 EEST (UTC+3)	Ro.Riski 77'; Saksela (yellow card) 85'	Report		Stadium: Bolt Arena; Referee: Petri Viljanen

31 October 2021 27	KuPS	1 – 1	HJK	Kuopio
18:00 EEST (UTC+3)	T.Hämäläinen 18'	Report	Tenho 13'; Valenčič (yellow card) 34'; Lingman (yellow card) 39'; Saksela (yellow card) 63'; Ro.Riski (yellow card) 90+4'; Keto (yellow card) 90+7'	Stadium: Kuopio Football Stadium; Referee: Mattias Gestranius

===== Table =====
Pos	Team	Pld	W	D	L	GF	GA	GD	Pts	Qualification
1	HJK (C)	27	18	5	4	41	19	+22	59	Qualification for the Champions League first qualifying round
2	KuPS	27	17	7	3	46	20	+26	58	Qualification for the Europa Conference League first qualifying round
3	SJK	27	14	6	7	45	34	+11	48	Qualification for the Europa Conference League first qualifying round
4	Inter Turku	27	14	3	10	45	32	+13	45	Qualification for the Europa Conference League first qualifying round
5	Ilves	27	11	3	13	29	34	−5	36	

Source: Soccerway
Rules for classification: 1) Points; 2) Goal difference; 3) Goals scored; 4) Head-to-head points; 5) Head-to-head goal difference; 6) Head-to-head away goals scored; 7) Play-off
(Note: Play-off is only played if need to decide champion, teams for relegation or UEFA competition and will be played on a neutral ground).
(C) Champions

=== Finnish Cup ===
==== Sixth round ====
Team	Pld	W	D	L	GF	GA	GD	Pts
HJK	3	2	1	0	9	3	+6	7
HIFK	3	2	0	1	3	2	+1	6
FC Lahti	3	1	1	1	4	2	+2	4
KTP	3	0	0	3	1	10	−9	0

6 February 2021 1	Lahti	1–1	HJK	Lahti
14:00 EET (UTC+2)	Forss (yellow card) 32'; Hertsi (yellow card) 63' (yellow-red card) 90+1'; Assehnoun 67'; Klinga (yellow card) 85'	Report	Lingman (yellow card) 39'; Jair 75'; Browne (yellow card) 76'; O'Shaughnessy (red card) 90'	Stadium: Mukkulan Halli; Referee: Joni Hyytiä

13 February 2021 2	HJK	2–1	HIFK	Helsinki
13:45 EET (UTC+2)	Ro.Riski 28'; Jair (yellow card) 39'; Moren (red card) 54'; Väänänen 90'	Report	Ali 37'; Mattila (yellow card) 47'	Stadium: Tali Halli Tekonurmi; Referee: Mattias Gestranius

4 March 2021 3	HJK	6–1	KTP	Helsinki
14:00 EET (UTC+2)	Ri.Riski 2'; Ro.Riski 9', 37'; Browne 19'; Valenčič 55'; Jair 71'	Report	Halsti 14' (o.g.); Asier (yellow card) 87'	Stadium: Bolt Arena; Referee: Antti Munukka

==== Knockout stage ====
3 April 2021 Quarter-final	HIFK	0–3	HJK	Helsinki
17:00 EEST (UTC+3)	Tukiainen (yellow card) 34'; Bäckman (yellow card) 39'; Patronen (yellow card) 50'; Halme (red card) 59'; Ahadi (yellow card) 87'	Report	Ro.Riski 50' (pen.); Browne (yellow card) 53'; Saksela 65'; Valenčič 68'; Ri.Riski (yellow card) 88'	Stadium: Jätkäsaari JP-halli TN; Referee: Mohammad Al Emara

10 April 2021 Semi-final	HJK	4–0	Inter Turku	Helsinki
18:00 EEST (UTC+3)	Valenčič 9'; Browne 16'; Väänänen (yellow card) 38'; Tenho (yellow card) 40'; Ro.Riski 54' (pen.); Tanaka 67'	Report	Hoskonen (yellow card) 45'; Haukioja (yellow card) 73'	Stadium: Bolt Arena; Referee: Dennis Antamo

==== Final ====
8 May 2021	HJK	0–0 (4 – 5 p)	KuPS	Helsinki
15:00 EEST (UTC+3)	Ri.Riski (yellow card) 4'; Gaucho Debohi (yellow card) 60'	Report	D.Carrillo (yellow card) 32' (yellow-red card) 63'; Nana (yellow card) 102'; H.Uzochukwu (yellow card) 115'	Stadium: Olympic Stadium; Referee: Oskari Hämäläinen
	Penalties
	Ro.Riski (penalty scored); O'Shaughnessy (penalty scored); Tanaka (penalty scored); Luís Henrique (penalty missed); Valenčič (penalty scored)		(penalty scored) Nana; (penalty scored) A.Popovitch; (penalty scored) Udo; (penalty scored) Tomas; (penalty scored) Järvinen

=== UEFA Champions League ===
==== Qualifying rounds ====
6 July 2021 First Qualifying Round 1st leg	HJK (Finland)	3 – 1	(Montenegro) Budućnost Podgorica	Helsinki, Finland
19:00 EEST (UTC+3)	Ro. Riski 5'; Valenčič 7'; Saksela 13' (yellow card) 34'; Browne (yellow card) 85'	Report	V.Terzić (yellow card) 31'; Raičković 35' (pen.); A.Babić (yellow card) 45'; Mirković (yellow card) 51'	Stadium: Bolt Arena; Attendance: 2,365; Referee: Nicolas Laforge (Belgium)

13 July 2021 First Qualifying Round 2nd leg	Budućnost Podgorica (Montenegro)	0 – 4 (1 – 7 agg.)	(Finland) HJK	Podgorica, Montenegro
21:30 EEST (UTC+3)	M.Đuričković (yellow card) 38'; A.Babić (yellow card) 70'	Report	Ro.Riski 6', 49'; Valenčič 35'; Jair 39'	Stadium: Podgorica City Stadium; Attendance: 1,450; Referee: Dragomir Draganov (Bulgaria)

21 July 2021 Second Qualifying Round 1st leg	Malmö (Sweden)	2 – 1	(Finland) HJK	Malmö, Sweden
20:00 EEST (UTC+3)	Čolak 45+1'; Larsson (yellow card) 61'; Christiansen 74'; Ahmedhodžić (yellow card) 88'	Report	Ro.Riski (yellow card) 12' (goal) 68'	Stadium: Stadion; Attendance: 5,324; Referee: Mykola Balakin (Ukraine)

27 July 2021 Second Qualifying Round 2nd leg	HJK (Finland)	2 – 2 (3 – 4 agg.)	(Sweden) Malmö	Helsinki, Finland
19:00 EEST (UTC+3)	Tenho 1'; Ro.Riski (yellow card) 3'; Valenčič (yellow card) 40'; Lingman (yellow card) 45+1'; Ri.Riski 78'; Jair (yellow card) 90+6'	Report	Christiansen 10'; Innocent (yellow card) 22'; Birmančević 76'; Nalić (yellow card) 82'	Stadium: Bolt Arena; Attendance: 6,465; Referee: Stuart Attwell (England)

=== UEFA Europa League ===
==== Qualifying rounds ====
3 August 2021 Third qualifying round 1st leg	Neftçi Baku (Azerbaijan)	2 – 2	(Finland) HJK	Baku, Azerbaijan
18:00 EEST (UTC+3)	Najafov (yellow card) 20'; Bougrine 59'; Harramiz (yellow card) 63'; Mahmudov 80'; Muradbayli (yellow card) 84'	Report	Murillo (yellow card) 49'; Ro.Riski 61'; Jair 65'; Peltola (yellow card) 80'; Tenho (yellow card) 83'; Ri.Riski (yellow card) 90+1'	Stadium: Eighth Kilometer District Stadium; Attendance: 3,500; Referee: William Collum (Scotland)

12 August 2021 Third qualifying round 2nd leg	HJK (Finland)	3 – 0 (5 – 2 agg.)	(Azerbaijan) Neftçi Baku	Helsinki, Finland
19:00 EEST (UTC+3)	Ri. Riski 46' (yellow card) 79'; Ro. Riski 60' (pen.), 89'; O'Shaughnessy (yellow card) 84'	Report	Mbodj (yellow card) 60'; Harramiz (yellow card) 66'; Najafov (yellow card) 83'	Stadium: Bolt Arena; Attendance: 4,068; Referee: Deniz Aytekin (Germany)

19 August 2021 Play-off round 1st leg	Fenerbahçe (Turkey)	1 – 0	(Finland) HJK	Istanbul, Turkey
21:45 EEST (UTC+3)	Aziz (yellow card) 41'; Gümüşkaya 65'	Report	Murillo (yellow card) 47'; Browne (yellow card) 89'	Stadium: Şükrü Saracoğlu Stadium; Attendance: 6,769; Referee: Benoît Bastien (France)

26 August 2021 Play-off round 2nd leg	HJK (Finland)	2 – 5 (2 – 6 agg.)	(Turkey) Fenerbahçe	Helsinki, Finland
19:00 EEST (UTC+3)	Hostikka (yellow card) 3'; Ro. Riski 27'; Ri. Riski 88'; M.Peltola (yellow card) 90'	Report	Valencia 11', 14', 52'; Güler (yellow card) 75'; Şanlıtürk 90+2'; M.Peltola 90+4' (o.g.)	Stadium: Bolt Arena; Referee: Ivan Kružliak (Slovakia)

=== UEFA Europa Conference League ===
==== Group stage ====
Pos	Team	Pld	W	D	L	GF	GA	GD	Pts	Qualification
1	(Austria) LASK	6	5	1	0	12	1	+11	16	Advance to round of 16
2	(Israel) Maccabi Tel Aviv	6	3	2	1	14	4	+10	11	Advance to knockout round play-offs
3	(Finland) HJK	6	2	0	4	5	15	−10	6	
4	(Armenia) Alashkert	6	0	1	5	4	15	−11	1	

Source: UEFA
Rules for classification: Group stage tiebreakers

16 September 2021 1	HJK (Finland)	0 – 2	(Austria) LASK	Helsinki, Finland
19:45 EEST (UTC+3)	Jair (yellow card) 80'	Report	Flecker (yellow card) 16'; Marešić 17'; Boller (yellow card) 31'; Horvath (yellow card) 76'; Potzmann (yellow card) 87'; Monschein 89'	Stadium: Bolt Arena; Attendance: 3,612; Referee: Kirill Levnikov (Russia)

30 September 2021 2	Alashkert (Armenia)	2 – 4	(Finland) HJK	Yerevan, Armenia
19:45 EEST (UTC+3)	Grigoryan (yellow card) 2' (yellow-red card) 35'; Embaló 24'; Kadio (yellow card) 44'; Papikyan (yellow card) 85'; Glišić 90+3'	Report	Ri. Riski 8'; Valenčič 57'; Murillo (yellow card) 58'; Ro. Riski 63'; Sparv (yellow card) 65'; Olusanya 90+5'	Stadium: Republican Stadium; Attendance: 2,000; Referee: Horatiu Fesnic (Romania)
Note: Match played at the Republican Stadium in Yerevan, instead of Alashkert's regular Alashkert Stadium, Yerevan, which did not meet UEFA requirements.

21 October 2021 3	HJK (Finland)	0 – 5	(Israel) Maccabi Tel Aviv	Helsinki, Finland
17:30 EEST (UTC+3)	O'Shaughnessy (yellow card) 86'	Report	Kanichowsky 28', 60'; Perica 49' (pen.); Piven (yellow card) 66'; Saborit 87' (pen.); Shamir 90+4'	Stadium: Bolt Arena; Attendance: 4,883; Referee: Pavel Orel (Czech Republic)

4 November 2021 4	Maccabi Tel Aviv (Israel)	3 – 0	(Finland) HJK	Tel Aviv, Israel
19:45 EET (UTC+2)	Kuwas 22'; Kanichowsky (yellow card) 48'; Lingman 65' (o.g.); Hernández (yellow card) 90'; Hozez 90+3'	Report	Tenho (yellow card) 30'	Stadium: Bloomfield Stadium; Attendance: 8,029; Referee: Rade Obrenovič (Slovenia)

25 November 2021 5	HJK (Finland)	1 – 0	(Armenia) Alashkert	Helsinki, Finland
19:45 EET (UTC+2)	Lingman (yellow card) 11'; Tanaka (yellow card) 45' (goal) 48'	Report	Milinković (yellow card) 35'; Kryuchkov (yellow card) 43'; Voskanyan (yellow card) 62'	Stadium: Bolt Arena; Attendance: 4,424; Referee: Bram Van Driessche (Belgium)

9 December 2021 6	LASK (Austria)	3 – 0	(Finland) HJK	Klagenfurt, Austria
21:45 EET (UTC+2)	Balić 41'; Michorl (yellow card) 53'; Gruber (yellow card) 58' (goal) 81'; Nakamura 63'	Report	Halsti (yellow card) 7'; Tenho (yellow card) 20'; Kouassivi-Benissan (yellow card) 67'	Stadium: Wörthersee Stadion; Attendance: 0 Referee: Igor Pajač (Croatia)
Note: LASK played their home matches at Wörthersee Stadion, Klagenfurt, instead of their regular stadium Linzer Stadion, Linz, due to renovation. Due to the COVID-19 pandemic in Europe, the match was played behind closed doors

== Squad statistics ==
As of match played 9 December 2021

=== Appearances and goals ===
No.	Pos	Nat	Player	Total		Veikkausliiga		Finnish Cup		UEFA Champions League		UEFA Europa League		UEFA Europa Conference League	
No.	Pos	Nat	Player	Apps	Goals	Apps	Goals	Apps	Goals	Apps	Goals	Apps	Goals	Apps	Goals
3	DF	(Finland) FIN	Janne Saksela	27	2	10+7	0	2	1	3	1	4	0	0+1	0
4	DF	(Finland) FIN	Markus Halsti	12	0	3+3	0	2+3	0	0	0	0	0	1	0
5	DF	(Finland) FIN	Daniel O'Shaughnessy	35	1	17+2	1	4	0	4	0	4	0	4	0
6	MF	(Brazil) BRA	Jair	36	10	18+2	6	3	2	4	1	4	1	5	0
7	FW	(Finland) FIN	Santeri Hostikka	17	1	4+6	1	0	0	0	0	2	0	3+2	0
8	MF	(Portugal) POR	Bubacar Djaló	17	0	6+7	0	1+1	0	0	0	0	0	1+1	0
9	MF	(Finland) FIN	Riku Riski	43	7	15+9	2	3+3	1	0+3	1	2+2	2	1+5	1
10	MF	(Finland) FIN	Lucas Lingman	38	2	20+1	2	6	0	4	0	2	0	5	0
11	FW	(Finland) FIN	Roope Riski	44	20	21+3	6	6	5	4	4	4	4	6	1
12	GK	(Sweden) SWE	Jakob Tånnander	14	0	6	0	0	0	4	0	4	0	0	0
13	DF	(Colombia) COL	Luis Carlos Murillo	39	0	12+8	0	5+1	0	3	0	4	0	4+2	0
14	MF	(Finland) FIN	Sebastian Dahlström	10	0	4+3	0	1	0	0+1	0	0+1	0	0	0
15	DF	(Finland) FIN	Miro Tenho	41	3	24	2	5	0	4	1	2	0	6	0
16	DF	(Finland) FIN	Valtteri Moren	40	1	23	1	2+1	0	4	0	4	0	6	0
17	FW	(Cameroon) CMR	Taddeus Nkeng	2	0	0+2	0	0	0	0	0	0	0	0	0
19	MF	(Finland) FIN	Casper Terho	18	2	7+5	2	0+3	0	0	0	0+1	0	0+2	0
20	MF	(Finland) FIN	Tim Sparv	9	0	2+3	0	0	0	0	0	2+1	0	1	0
21	MF	(Finland) FIN	Santeri Väänänen	20	1	5+4	0	2+2	1	0	0	0+2	0	3+2	0
22	DF	(Finland) FIN	Kevin Kouassivi-Benissan	11	0	3+3	0	0+1	0	0	0	0+2	0	1+1	0
24	FW	(Papua New Guinea) PNG	David Browne	41	7	18+5	5	5+1	2	2+2	0	2+2	0	3+1	0
27	MF	(Slovenia) SLO	Filip Valenčič	47	12	23+4	6	6	3	4	2	4	0	4+2	1
29	FW	(Finland) FIN	Anthony Olusanya	26	4	4+12	3	0+3	0	0+1	0	0+2	0	1+3	1
31	GK	(Finland) FIN	Hugo Keto	33	0	21	0	6	0	0	0	0	0	6	0
37	MF	(Japan) JPN	Atomu Tanaka	28	3	9+7	1	4+1	1	4	0	0	0	3	1
47	MF	(Finland) FIN	Matti Peltola	25	0	10+6	0	0	0	0+1	0	0+4	0	2+2	0
71	MF	(Ivory Coast) CIV	Dieudonné Gaucho Debohi	1	0	0	0	0+1	0	0	0	0	0	0	0
Players from Klubi-04 who appeared:
Players away from the club on loan:
88	MF	(Finland) FIN	Pyry Hannola	1	0	0	0	0+1	0	0	0	0	0	0	0
Players who left HJK during the season:
7	FW	(Brazil) BRA	Luís Henrique	16	3	5+7	3	0+2	0	0+2	0	0	0	0	0
18	DF	(Australia) AUS	Dylan Murnane	9	0	6+2	0	1	0	0	0	0	0	0	0
20	FW	(Finland) FIN	Enoch Banza	1	0	0	0	0+1	0	0	0	0	0	0	0
33	DF	(Switzerland) SUI	Joel Untersee	4	0	0	0	2+2	0	0	0	0	0	0	0

=== Goal scorers ===
Place	Position	Nation	Number	Name	Veikkausliiga	Finnish Cup	UEFA Champions League	UEFA Europa League	UEFA Europa Conference League	Total
1	FW	(Finland)	11	Roope Riski	6	5	4	4	1	20
2	MF	(Slovenia)	27	Filip Valenčič	6	3	2	0	1	12
3	MF	(Brazil)	6	Jair	6	2	1	1	0	10
4	FW	(Papua New Guinea)	24	David Browne	5	2	0	0	0	7
4	MF	(Finland)	9	Riku Riski	2	1	1	2	1	7
6	FW	(Finland)	29	Anthony Olusanya	3	0	0	0	1	4
7	FW	(Brazil)	7	Luís Henrique	3	0	0	0	0	3
7	DF	(Finland)	15	Miro Tenho	2	0	1	0	0	3
7	MF	(Japan)	37	Atomu Tanaka	1	1	0	0	1	3
10	MF	(Finland)	19	Casper Terho	2	0	0	0	0	2
10	MF	(Finland)	10	Lucas Lingman	2	0	0	0	0	2
10	DF	(Finland)	3	Janne Saksela	0	1	1	0	0	2
13	FW	(Finland)	7	Santeri Hostikka	1	0	0	0	0	1
13	DF	(Finland)	16	Valtteri Moren	1	0	0	0	0	1
13	MF	(Finland)	21	Santeri Väänänen	0	1	0	0	0	1
13	MF	(Finland)	5	Daniel O'Shaughnessy	0	1	0	0	0	1
TOTALS					41	16	10	7	5	77

=== Clean sheets ===
Place	Position	Nation	Number	Name	Veikkausliiga	Finnish Cup	UEFA Champions League	UEFA Europa League	UEFA Europa Conference League	Total
1	GK	(Finland)	31	Hugo Keto	9	2	0	0	1	12
2	GK	(Sweden)	12	Jakob Tånnander	5	0	1	1	0	7
TOTALS					14	2	1	1	1	19

=== Disciplinary record ===
Number	Nation	Position	Name	Veikkausliiga		Finnish Cup		UEFA Champions League		UEFA Europa League		UEFA Europa Conference League		Total	
Number	Nation	Position	Name	Yellow card	Red card	Yellow card	Red card	Yellow card	Red card	Yellow card	Red card	Yellow card	Red card	Yellow card	Red card
3	(Finland)	DF	Janne Saksela	2	0	0	0	1	0	0	0	0	0	3	0
4	(Finland)	DF	Markus Halsti	0	0	0	0	0	0	0	0	1	0	1	0
5	(Finland)	DF	Daniel O'Shaughnessy	1	0	0	1	0	0	1	0	1	0	3	1
6	(Brazil)	MF	Jair	4	0	1	0	1	0	0	0	1	0	7	0
7	(Ivory Coast)	FW	Santeri Hostikka	2	0	0	0	0	0	1	0	0	0	3	0
8	(Portugal)	MF	Bubacar Djaló	4	0	0	0	0	0	0	0	0	0	4	0
9	(Finland)	MF	Riku Riski	2	0	2	0	0	0	2	0	0	0	6	0
10	(Finland)	MF	Lucas Lingman	1	0	1	0	1	0	0	0	1	0	4	0
11	(Finland)	FW	Roope Riski	5	0	0	0	2	0	0	0	0	0	7	0
13	(Colombia)	DF	Luis Carlos Murillo	4	0	0	0	0	0	2	0	1	0	7	0
14	(Finland)	MF	Sebastian Dahlström	1	0	0	0	0	0	0	0	0	0	1	0
15	(Finland)	DF	Miro Tenho	4	0	1	0	0	0	1	0	2	0	8	0
16	(Finland)	DF	Valtteri Moren	2	0	0	1	0	0	0	0	0	0	2	1
19	(Finland)	MF	Casper Terho	1	0	0	0	0	0	0	0	0	0	1	0
20	(Finland)	MF	Tim Sparv	0	0	0	0	0	0	0	0	1	0	1	0
21	(Finland)	MF	Santeri Väänänen	0	0	1	0	0	0	0	0	0	0	1	0
22	(Finland)	DF	Kevin Kouassivi-Benissan	0	0	0	0	0	0	0	0	1	0	1	0
24	(Papua New Guinea)	FW	David Browne	1	0	2	0	1	0	1	0	0	0	5	0
27	(Slovenia)	MF	Filip Valenčič	1	0	0	0	1	0	0	0	0	0	2	0
29	(Finland)	FW	Anthony Olusanya	1	0	0	0	0	0	0	0	0	0	1	0
31	(Finland)	GK	Hugo Keto	3	0	0	0	0	0	0	0	0	0	3	0
37	(Japan)	MF	Atomu Tanaka	1	0	0	0	0	0	0	0	1	0	2	0
47	(Finland)	MF	Matti Peltola	4	0	0	0	0	0	2	0	0	0	6	0
71	(Ivory Coast)	MF	Didi	0	0	1	0	0	0	0	0	0	0	1	0
Players away on loan:
Players who left HJK during the season:
7	(Brazil)	FW	Luís Henrique	1	0	0	0	0	0	0	0	0	0	1	0
18	(Australia)	DF	Dylan Murnane	1	0	0	0	0	0	0	0	0	0	1	0
TOTALS				46	0	9	2	7	0	10	0	10	0	82	2
