= Jair (footballer, born 3 August 1994) =

Brazilian footballer (born 1994)

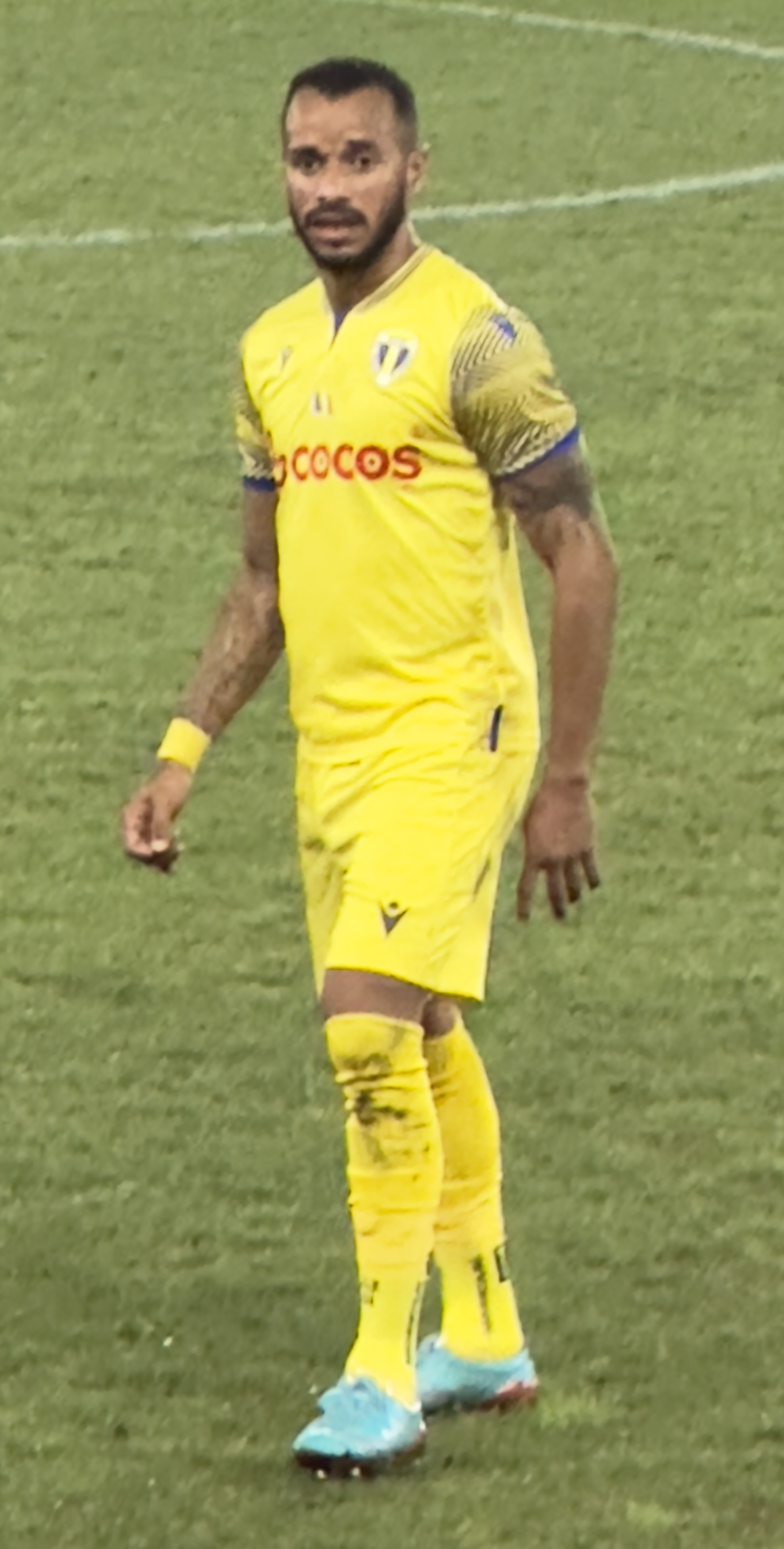
- Jair with Petrolul Ploiești in 2023

Personal information
- Full name: Jair Tavares da Silva
- Date of birth: 3 August 1994 (age 32)
- Place of birth: Barra de Santo Antônio, Brazil
- Height: 1.74 m (5 ft 9 in)
- Position: Midfielder

Team information
- Current team: ASA Târgu Mureș
- Number: 10

Youth career
- –2013: Cotia
- 2014: Ituano

Senior career*
| Years | Team | Apps | (Gls) |
| 2015–2016 | Ituano | 0 | (0) |
| 2016 | → AC Oulu (loan) | 25 | (1) |
| 2017–2018 | AC Oulu | 46 | (7) |
| 2019–2020 | Ilves | 46 | (5) |
| 2021–2022 | HJK | 31 | (8) |
| 2022–2024 | Petrolul Ploiești | 72 | (10) |
| 2024–2025 | Erokspor | 8 | (1) |
| 2025 | Mes Rafsanjan | 4 | (0) |
| 2025–2026 | Hermannstadt | 19 | (0) |
| 2026– | ASA Târgu Mureș | 3 | (0) |
- * Club domestic league appearances and goals as of 31 October 2026

Jair Tavares da Silva (Portuguese pronunciation: [ʒaˈiʁ]; born 3 August 1994), known mononymously as Jair, is a Brazilian professional footballer who plays as a midfielder for Liga II club ASA Târgu Mureș.

Jair started his senior career in native Brazil at Ituano, but made a name for himself after moving to Finland in 2016. There, he represented AC Oulu, Ilves, and HJK, winning a combined two domestic trophies in the country and being named in the Veikkausliiga Team of the Year in 2021. The following year, he signed for Romanian club Petrolul Ploiești.

== Career ==
=== Early career / AC Oulu ===
Jair started out his senior career with Ituano in 2015, featuring sparringly for the Brazilian side—mostly in the Copa Paulista—before moving to Finnish club AC Oulu the next year. He spent his first season in the Ykkönen on loan, after which he signed a permanent contract.

In the 2018 season, Jair was voted the second league's Midfielder of the Year by the Football Players Association.

=== Ilves ===
In November 2018, Jair joined Veikkausliiga club Ilves, where he played for two seasons. He made his top flight debut on 7 April 2019, in a 2–0 away win over KPV, and scored his first goal in the competition one month later, in a 1–1 dome draw with Honka.

On 15 June 2019, Jair played the full 90 minutes in a 2–0 victory over IFK Mariehamn in the final of the Finnish Cup. On 27 August 2020, he made his first European appearance by starting in a UEFA Europa League first qualifying round match with Irish club Shamrock Rovers; he converted his penalty shoot-out kick as Ilves lost 11 to 12.

=== HJK ===
On 13 November 2020, Jair chose to stay in Finland and its first division by agreeing to a two-year contract with the option of another year with HJK. He scored on debut on 6 February 2021, in a 1–1 Finnish Cup draw at Lahti. On 18 June, he scored the 2–1 winner in a Veikkausliiga home fixture against his former team Ilves.

On 13 July 2021, Jair netted his first European goal in a 4–0 away thrashing of Montenegrin side Budućnost in the first qualifying round of the Champions League. After HJK's elimination from the Champions League, on 3 August he scored again in a 2–2 draw at Azerbaijani club Neftçi in the third qualifying round of the Europa League. HJK also missed qualification to the latter competition's group stage after a 2–6 aggregate loss to Fenerbahçe in the play-off round, and Jair went on to amass five games in Group A of the Europa Conference League.

On 16 October 2021, Jair scored his first career double in a 3–2 away Veikkausliiga victory over Ilves. He totalled six goals from 20 league games during his debut season in Helsinki, being named in the Team of the Year as HJK defended its national title. He scored another double on 8 May 2022, in a 2–1 home win also against his former club Ilves in the league.

On 13 June 2022, HJK terminated Jair's deal after Finnish media reported that he had been convicted of child sexual abuse one year earlier.

=== Petrolul Ploiești ===
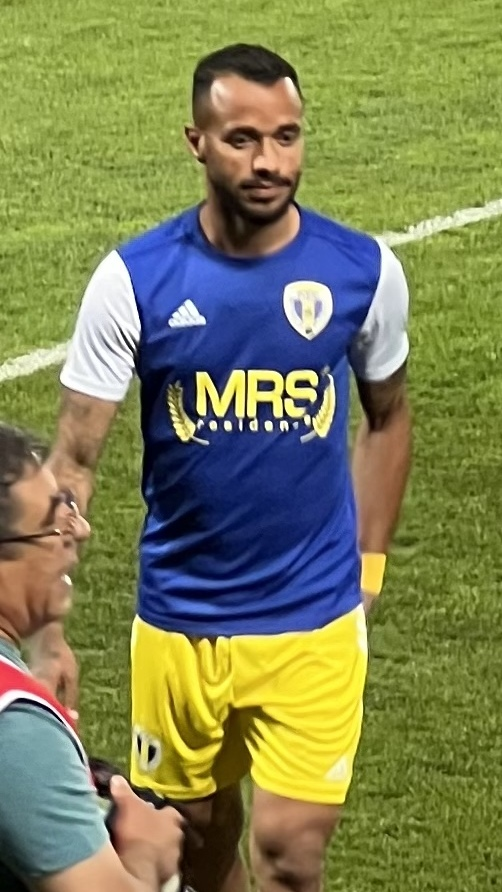
Jair training for Petrolul Ploiești before his Liga I debut against Voluntari, 18 July 2022.

On 17 June 2022, Jair signed a two-year contract with Romanian club Petrolul Ploiești, recently promoted to the Liga I. Petrolul stated that it took note of his conviction in Finland, but considered that his subsequent behaviour should allow him to work and provide for his family. He made his competitive debut on 18 July, coming on as a 72nd-minute substitute for Lucian Dumitriu in a 0–1 home league loss to Voluntari.

On 19 August 2022, Jair netted his first Petrolul goal—and the only of the match—by converting a free kick in an away fixture against FC U Craiova. He played 35 games and scored three goals in all competitions in the 2022–23 campaign, as the team finished eighth overall in the national league.

On 6 August 2023, Jair scored in a 3–2 home Liga I success over defending champion Farul Constanța. On 28 October, he converted a free kick in a 2–2 home league draw with FCSB. In the first match of the calendar year on 20 January 2024, he scored the only goal of a home fixture against Dinamo București.

== Personal life ==
In 2016, Jair was accused by a 12-year-old girl from Oulu, Finland, of kissing her and trying to put her pants down; he was aware of her age, admitted to the kiss, but denied the sexual touching. He received a seven-month suspended sentence for child sexual abuse and paid the victim a €1,500 fine.

== Career statistics ==
As of match played 31 October 2026

Appearances and goals by club, season and competition
| Club | Season | League | | | State league | | National cup (Note: Includes Copa do Brasil, Finnish Cup, Cupa României, Turkish Cup) | | Continental | | Other | | Total | |
| Club | Season | Division | Apps | Goals | Apps | Goals | Apps | Goals | Apps | Goals | Apps | Goals | Apps | Goals |
|---|---|---|---|---|---|---|---|---|---|---|---|---|---|---|
| Ituano | 2015 | — | | | 0 | 0 | 1 | 0 | — | | 6 (Note: Appearances in Copa Paulista) | 0 | 7 | 0 |
| Ituano | 2016 | Série D | 0 | 0 | 0 | 0 | 0 | 0 | — | | — | | 0 | 0 |
| Ituano | Total | | 0 | 0 | 0 | 0 | 1 | 0 | — | | 6 | 0 | 7 | 0 |
| AC Oulu (loan) | 2016 | Ykkönen | 25 | 1 | — | | 5 | 1 | — | | — | | 30 | 2 |
| AC Oulu | 2017 | Ykkönen | 19 | 3 | — | | 6 | 1 | — | | — | | 25 | 4 |
| AC Oulu | 2018 | Ykkönen | 27 | 4 | — | | 7 | 1 | — | | — | | 34 | 5 |
| AC Oulu | Total | | 71 | 8 | — | | 18 | 3 | — | | — | | 89 | 11 |
| Ilves | 2019 | Veikkausliiga | 26 | 2 | — | | 9 | 1 | — | | — | | 35 | 3 |
| Ilves | 2020 | Veikkausliiga | 20 | 3 | — | | 5 | 0 | 1 (Note: Appearance in UEFA Europa League) | 0 | — | | 26 | 3 |
| Ilves | Total | | 46 | 5 | — | | 14 | 1 | 1 | 0 | — | | 61 | 6 |
| HJK | 2021 | Veikkausliiga | 20 | 6 | — | | 3 | 2 | 13 (Note: Four appearances and one goal in UEFA Champions League, four appearances and one goal in UEFA Europa League, five appearances in UEFA Europa Conference League) | 2 | — | | 36 | 10 |
| HJK | 2022 | Veikkausliiga | 11 | 2 | — | | 0 | 0 | 0 | 0 | 3 (Note: Appearances in Finnish League Cup) | 0 | 14 | 2 |
| HJK | Total | | 31 | 8 | — | | 6 | 2 | 13 | 2 | 3 | 0 | 53 | 12 |
| Petrolul Ploiești | 2022–23 | Liga I | 34 | 3 | — | | 1 | 0 | — | | — | | 35 | 3 |
| Petrolul Ploiești | 2023–24 | Liga I | 38 | 7 | — | | 2 | 0 | — | | — | | 40 | 7 |
| Petrolul Ploiești | Total | | 72 | 10 | — | | 3 | 0 | — | | — | | 75 | 10 |
| Erokspor | 2024–25 | TFF 1. Lig | 8 | 1 | — | | 1 | 0 | — | | — | | 9 | 1 |
| Mes Rafsanjan | 2024–25 | Persian Gulf Pro League | 4 | 0 | — | | 0 | 0 | — | | — | | 4 | 0 |
| Hermannstadt | 2025–26 | Liga I | 19 | 0 | — | | 4 | 0 | — | | — | | 23 | 0 |
| ASA Târgu Mureș | 2026–27 | Liga II | 3 | 0 | — | | — | | — | | — | | 3 | 0 |
| Career total | | | 254 | 32 | 0 | 0 | 44 | 6 | 14 | 2 | 9 | 0 | 321 | 40 |

== Honours ==
Ituano

- Copa Paulista runner-up: 2015

Ilves

- Finnish Cup: 2019

HJK

- Veikkausliiga: 2021, 2022
- Finnish Cup runner-up: 2021

=== Individual ===
- Veikkausliiga Breakthrough of the Year: 2019
- Veikkausliiga Team of the Year: 2021
