= Casper Terho =

Finnish footballer (born 2003)

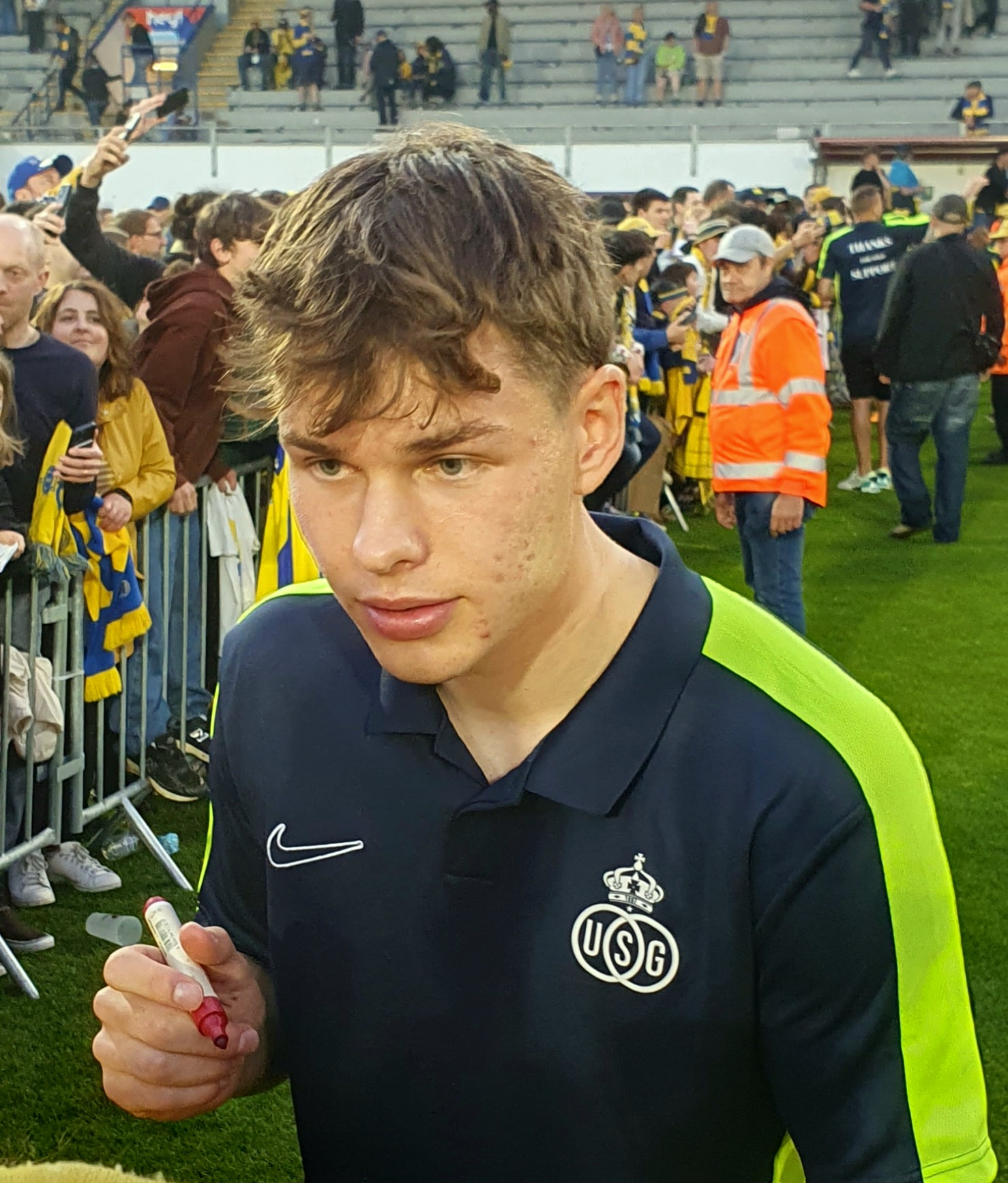
- Terho at Union SG in 2024

Personal information
- Full name: Casper Mikael Terho
- Date of birth: 24 June 2003 (age 23)
- Place of birth: Helsinki, Finland
- Height: 1.84 m (6 ft 0 in)
- Position: Winger

Team information
- Current team: Sparta Rotterdam
- Number: 7

Youth career
- –2013: MPS
- 2013–2016: Puotinkylän Valtti
- 2017: PK-35
- 2017–2018: Kontu
- 2018–2020: HJK

Senior career*
Years	Team	Apps	(Gls)
2019–2021	Klubi 04	27	(15)
2020–2022	HJK	41	(6)
2023–2025	Union SG	36	(5)
2025	→ SC Paderborn (loan)	11	(0)
2025–2026	OH Leuven	12	(0)
2026	→ Sparta Rotterdam (loan)	9	(1)
2026–	Sparta Rotterdam	9	(1)

International career^{‡}
2018–2019	Finland U16	5	(3)
2019	Finland U17	6	(1)
2021–2022	Finland U19	8	(4)
2021–2025	Finland U21	24	(5)
2024–	Finland	3	(0)
- * Club domestic league appearances and goals as of 25 October 2026 ‡ National team caps and goals as of 2 February 2026

Casper Mikael Terho (born 24 June 2003) is a Finnish professional footballer who plays as a winger for Eredivisie club Sparta Rotterdam and the Finland national team.

== Early career ==
Terho grew up in Vuosaari, East Helsinki, and played football in the youth teams of Helsinki-based clubs Malmin Palloseura, Puotinkylän Valtti, PK-35 and Kontu. In 2018, when playing in a youth team of Kontu, he was spotted by two HJK academy coaches at the time, Miika Takkula and Jyrki Ahola, and later in the same year, he joined the youth academy of HJK Helsinki.

== Club career ==
=== HJK ===
Casper Terho made his professional debut for Helsingin Jalkapalloklubi on the 26 August 2020, coming on as a substitute in the Veikkausliiga 2–0 home win against Seinäjoen Jalkapallokerho. Along with other youngsters such as Kai Meriluoto, he played a few other games by the end of season, where his team ended up winning the 2020 championship. He has also played for HJK reserve team Klubi 04 in third-tier Kakkonen and second-tier Ykkönen.

Being already viewed as one of the brightest hopes from the Finnish champions academy, he scored his first goal in his 2021 season debuts, during the 4–2 home championship win against FC Honka on the 24 April 2021. By the end of May, he became a regular starter with HJK, scoring another goal against Ilves, while still aged only 17.

=== Royale Union Saint-Gilloise ===
On 29 September 2022, Belgian side Union SG announced that they had reached an agreement with HJK about his transfer. He joined the Belgian side on 1 January 2023 on a deal until 30 June 2026, for an undisclosed fee, with HJK securing a sell-on clause. He officially made his debut for the club on 8 January against Anderlecht, as a 77th-minute substitute. Terho scored his first goal for the club on 20 April 2023, in the first leg of the 2022–23 UEFA Europa League quarter finals against Bayer Leverkusen. Despite his goal, his team lost the game 4–1 (5–2 on aggregate), and were eventually knocked out of the competition. On 23 April 2023, Terho scored his first goals in the Jupiler Pro League, a brace in a 4–2 away win against Kortrijk. In 2024, Terho and Union SG won the Belgian Cup and the Belgian Super Cup.

==== SC Paderborn (loan) ====
On 1 January 2025, it was announced that Terho was loaned out to 2. Bundesliga club SC Paderborn 07 for the remainder of the season with a purchase option.

=== OH Leuven ===
On 3 July 2025, Terho signed with Belgian Pro League club OH Leuven on a deal until 2028 for an undisclosed fee.

=== Sparta Rotterdam ===
On 2 February 2026, it was announced that Terho was loaned out to Eredivisie club Sparta Rotterdam for the remainder of the season with a purchase option. On 4 June 2026, Sparta made the transfer permanent and signed a four-season contract with Terho.

== International career ==
Terho is a youth international for Finland, taking part in the 2020 Euro under-17 qualifications, where Finland topped their pool with Czech Republic, Bosnia and Herzegovina and Moldova, although the final stage of the tournament was eventually canceled due to the COVID pandemic.

Terho played regularly for the Finnish under-17, under-19 and under-21 national teams, before making his senior debut for Finland on 4 June 2024, in a 4–2 friendly defeat against Portugal.

In November 2024, Terho scored two goals for Finland U21 in the 2025 UEFA European Under-21 Championship qualification play-offs matches against Norway, helping Finland to win the pair 6–3 on aggregate and to qualify for the final tournament, for the second time in the nation's history. He also scored Finland's first goal in the tournament, in a 2–2 draw against the Netherlands.

== Career statistics ==
=== Club ===
As of 28 October 2026

Appearances and goals by club, season and competition
Club	Season	League			National cup (Note: Includes Suomen Cup and Belgian Cup)		League cup (Note: Includes Kakkonen Cup and Finnish League Cup)		Europe		Other		Total	
Club	Season	Division	Apps	Goals	Apps	Goals	Apps	Goals	Apps	Goals	Apps	Goals	Apps	Goals
Klubi 04	2019	Kakkonen	5	3	0	0	—		—		—		5	3
Klubi 04	2020	Kakkonen	10	9	0	0	1	1	—		—		11	10
Klubi 04	2021	Ykkönen	12	3	—		—		—		—		12	3
Klubi 04	Total		27	15	0	0	1	1	0	0	0	0	28	17
HJK	2020	Veikkausliiga	3	0	0	0	—		—		—		3	0
HJK	2021	Veikkausliiga	12	2	3	0	—		3 (Note: Appearances in UEFA Europa League and UEFA Europa Conference League)	0	—		18	2
HJK	2022	Veikkausliiga	26	4	2	1	3	0	6 (Note: Appearances in UEFA Champions League and UEFA Europa League)	0	—		37	5
HJK	Total		41	6	5	1	3	0	9	0	0	0	58	7
Union SG	2022–23	Belgian Pro League	6	2	0	0	—		2 (Note: Appearances in UEFA Europa League)	1	—		8	3
Union SG	2023–24	Belgian Pro League	21	3	3	0	—		8	1	—		32	4
Union SG	2024–25	Belgian Pro League	9	0	0	0	—		1 (Note: Appearance(s) in UEFA Champions League)	0	1 (Note: Includes Belgian Super Cup)	0	11	0
Union SG	Total		36	5	3	0	0	0	11	2	1	0	51	7
SC Paderborn (loan)	2024–25	2. Bundesliga	11	0	0	0	—		—		—		11	0
OH Leuven	2025–26	Belgian Pro League	12	0	1	0	—		—		—		13	0
Sparta Rotterdam (loan)	2025–26	Eredivisie	9	1	—		—		—		—		9	1
Sparta Rotterdam	2026–27	Eredivisie	9	1	1	0	—		—		—		10	1
Career total			145	29	10	1	4	1	20	2	1	0	180	33

=== International ===
As of match played 9 October 2025

National team	Year	Competitive		Friendly		Total	
National team	Year	Apps	Goals	Apps	Goals	Apps	Goals
Finland	2024	0	0	2	0	2	0
Finland	2025	1 (Note: Appearances in the 2026 FIFA World Cup qualification.)	0	0	0	1	0
Total		1	0	2	0	3	0

== Honours ==
HJK

- Veikkausliiga: 2020, 2021, 2022
- Finnish Cup runner-up: 2021

Union SG

- Belgian Pro League: 2024–25
- Belgian Pro League runner-up: 2023–24
- Belgian Cup: 2023–24
- Belgian Super Cup: 2024
