= David Browne (soccer) =

Papua New Guinean footballer

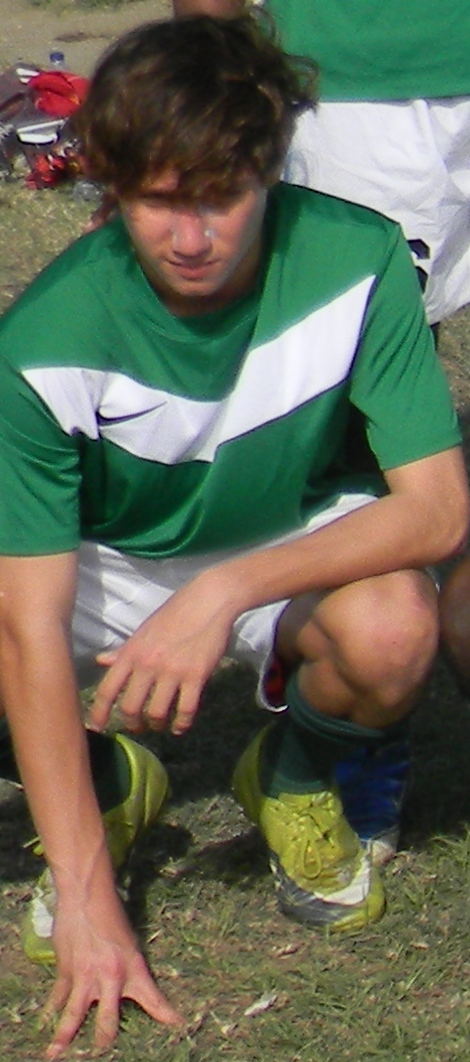
- Browne in 2011

Personal information
- Full name: David Eric Browne
- Date of birth: 27 December 1995 (age 30)
- Place of birth: Port Moresby, Papua New Guinea
- Height: 1.75 m (5 ft 9 in)
- Positions: Forward; midfielder

Youth career
- 2010–2011: POMSOE FC
- 2012: Central United

Senior career*
Years	Team	Apps	(Gls)
2012–2015	Auckland City	33	(10)
2015–2016	PEC Zwolle	0	(0)
2016–2018	FC Groningen	0	(0)
2018–2019	Auckland City	21	(7)
2020–2022	HJK Helsinki	59	(8)
2020	→ Klubi 04	1	(0)

International career
2011	Papua New Guinea U17	4	(1)
2017	Papua New Guinea	3	(0)
- * Club domestic league appearances and goals as of 18 February 2023

David Eric Browne (born 27 December 1995) is a Papua New Guinean former professional soccer player who played as a forward or a midfielder. He was the first Papua New Guinean footballer to play professionally in Europe. Besides New Zealand, he played in the Netherlands and Finland.

== Early career ==
Around the age of 10, Browne began playing football as a goalkeeper. He began his football career in the Port Moresby suburb of Kaugere at the Living Light Academy. Between 2007 and 2010, he changed schools three times, attending Korobosea International School from 2007 to 2008, St Josephs International School in 2009, and Port Moresby International School in 2010. Browne played for two years for local development team Port Moresby School of Excellence FC of the Port Moresby Soccer Association from 2010 to 2011. POMSOE FC was founded in 2010 and featured mostly players from the Papua New Guinea national under-17 team. He left Papua New Guinea for a football scholarship in New Zealand in 2012.

== Club career ==
He is a young boy who is full of talent and speed. How he does things is very good. We put him in because we believe he is good enough.

— Auckland City FC head coach Ramon Tribulietx about Browne's inclusion on the FIFA Club World Cup roster

While participating in Under-17 World Cup qualification, Browne was spotted and offered a scholarship by St Peter's College in Auckland, New Zealand. While playing for the college, he also played for Central United of the Northern League at age 16. Central United accumulated a 10–1–7 record, finishing in 3rd place for the season. Following his one season with the club, he was named the Player of the Year. Browne attended St Peter's College for three years before graduating in 2013. He was St. Peter's top scorer in 2011 and voted a member of the state team. During the 2012 season with Central United, he was then spotted by Auckland City FC of the ASB Premiership because of a partnership between the two clubs.

=== Auckland City ===
He was 16 when he signed for Auckland and immediately joined the club's first team. Between 2012 and 2015, Browne scored a total of 10 league goals in 33 league matches. He won the OFC Champions League with the club twice, in 2013 and 2014. He also participated in the 2012, 2013, and 2014 FIFA Club World Cups and earned the surprise bronze medal in 2014 after beating Mexico's Cruz Azul on penalties, in addition to multiple other league and confederation championships and awards. In 2012, he was the youngest player at the FIFA Club World Cup at age 16 and was selected by head coach Ramon Tribulietx after being with the club for only three months. At that time, he was the youngest ever player from Papua New Guinea to take part in the tournament and the second youngest player ever overall. Browne turned 17 shortly after the final, making him older than only Víctor Mañón who was part of Mexico's C.F. Pachuca's squad in 2008. He was also the first Papua New Guinea player to take part in the competition since Hekari United qualified in 2010. Following the 2014–15 ASB Premiership season, Browne was named the player with the most potential in the league by a columnist of The New Zealand Herald because of his exciting style of play, full range of talent, and performances which included a hat-trick against Waitakere United in the league semi-final. Following his final season with Auckland City, he was given the team's Young Player of the Year award. That season he was also the team's joint top scorer, tied with Joao Moreira.

=== PEC Zwolle ===
In 2015, Browne was among players selected from 30 countries to trial in the Nike Most Wanted Global Showcase. After impressing in the showcase, he had the option to join the Nike Football Academy or sign for a professional team in the Netherlands. He was one of roughly 50 players from around the world who were offered the opportunity to join the academy based at the St George's Park National Football Centre. However, he chose the latter option and was signed to Jong PEC Zwolle, the reserve side of PEC Zwolle of the Eredivisie. He scored on his debut for the Zwolle U21 side, a 3–1 victory over Helmond Sport in the opening match of the season on 10 August 2015. He also scored in a friendly against Jong FC Twente the following month. Browne played in the reserve side's final match of the season, a 0–4 defeat to Jong SC Cambuur which saw Zwolle finish at the bottom of its group. He first appeared on the first team's match day roster on 27 February 2016 as an unused substitute in a league match against SC Cambuur. He was a member of both the reserve and first teams. He appeared in 7 reserve league matches, scoring one goal, but never made a first team appearance over the course of the season.

=== FC Groningen ===
In June 2016 it was announced that Browne had been signed by FC Groningen, also of the Eredivisie, in part to be a replacement for the injured attacker Kasper Oldenburger in the reserve team. When training for the 2016–17 season commenced, Browne practiced with FC Groningen U23, formerly known as Jong FC Groningen prior to that season, which competed in the Derde Divisie. Browne and the U23 side were undefeated in their first five exhibitions matches of the season. Browne was a 70th-minute substitute in the team's opening match of the season, a 1–2 defeat to SVV Scheveningen. He had a good chance to level the score after coming on but the free kick was cleared on the goal line. He scored his first goal for the club on 1 October 2016, scoring the opening goal in the 3rd minute of an eventual 3–3 draw with Rijnsburgse Boys. On 4 February 2017, Browne scored his first brace for the club in a league match against SteDoCo. The 4–0 victory was the largest margin of victory for the club at that point of the season.

It was announced on 24 February 2017 that Browne was named to the senior squad for the team's next league fixture, a home match against FC Utrecht on 25 February. His success with the under-23 team was cited as a reason for the call up. He was left on the bench as an unused substitute in the match, an eventual 2–3 defeat.

In late March 2017 it was announced that Browne and FC Groningen were negotiating a new contract to keep the player at the club for the 2017–18 season. On 7 June 2017, it was officially announced that Browne would be returning for another season. As preparation for the upcoming season, Browne and the under-23 squad competed in a tournament in Germany in which they finished in fourth place. The team played against SV Rödinghausen, Be Quick 1887, SC Spelle-Venhaus, and PEC Zwolle. He then appeared in a 3–0 victory over SC Cambuur.

Browne was named to Groningen's first team squad for its final match of the 2017 season, an encounter with Sparta Rotterdam on 24 December. It was also announced at that time that he would join the first team on its offseason training camp in Spain. He was left on the bench as an unused substitute as Groningen beat Sparta Rotterdam 4–0.

On 26 May 2018 Browne scored the game-winning goal of a 1–0 victory over ONS Sneek on the last matchday of the season, securing 5th place in the league. However, it was announced that Browne would be departing the club after the match.

=== Return to Auckland City ===
Browne returned to Auckland City for the 2018–19 season. He scored his first goal since his return in a 3–1 win over Tasman United in Auckland City's second game of the season. However, he also suffered a head collision with opposing goalkeeper Corey Wilson, resulting in a concussion and facial fractures which necessitated an extended period on the sidelines. Browne returned to action 7 weeks later against the same opposition, Tasman United, scoring two goals in a 3–1 victory helping his side continue their perfect start to the season. In 2019 Browne was Auckland City's top scorer across all competitions including nine goals in the 2019 OFC Champions League in which the team advanced to the semi-finals.

=== HJK Helsinki ===
In January 2020 Browne returned to Europe to trial with Finnish club HJK Helsinki. On 18 January he appeared in a 2–1 friendly victory over Latvian club FK RFS. He assisted on the team's first goal by Tim Väyrynen before nearly scoring himself, including on a shot that struck the inside of the goal post. He scored his first goal for the club one week later in a 3–0 2020 Finnish Cup victory over Veikkausliiga club TPS. After appearing in the team's next cup match, the team officially announced on 3 February 2020 that they had signed Browne to a one-year contract with a club option for an additional two seasons. During the 2022 season, Browne played mainly as a right wing back. Browne appeared in 22 of 27 league matches for the club, recording 1304 minutes, two goals and one assist, including a goal against FC Haka, which secured HJK the title. Browne also started in all eight European qualifiers, four Champions League Qualifiers and four Europa League Qualifiers. He recorded two goals in Europa League Qualifying, one against NK Maribor in a 0–2 third round away win, and the only goal as HJK defeated Silkeborg IF 1–0 in the first leg of the Europa League Play-Off round. After drawing the second leg, HJK qualified for the Europa League, where Browne has started all five matches, including two against AS Roma. In the second meeting in Helsinki, Browne scored a wonder strike in the 79th minute which would have tied the match at 2–2, but was disallowed after a VAR check due to a foul committed in the box. His contract with HJK expired at the end of the 2022 season.

== International career ==
I was born here, I grew up here. I feel Papua New Guinean so I am Papua New Guinean. It's in my heart to play for this country and I'm glad to be back to play.

— Browne about the opportunity to once again represent Papua New Guinea

In 2005, Browne represented Papua New Guinea at an under-12 tournament in Fiji. He was teammates on that team with youth squad captain and future senior international Alwin Komolong. He was part of Papua New Guinea's squad for the 2011 OFC U-17 Championship. He appeared in four matches and scored one goal during the tournament. His goal came in 2–1 victory over American Samoa. He hit the crossbar on another shot during the match. Despite moving to New Zealand and attending school and playing football there for several years, he was ineligible for a call-up from New Zealand Football.

In November 2015, it was announced that Browne was invited as part of Papua New Guinea's initial 29-man squad for the 2016 OFC Nations Cup, hosted by Papua New Guinea, which also served as qualification for the 2017 FIFA Confederations Cup and the second round of 2018 FIFA World Cup qualification. However, he was not part of the final roster.

In January 2017 it was announced that Browne was part of Papua New Guinea's initial 23-man squad for two 2018 FIFA World Cup qualification matches against Tahiti in March. He arrived at training camp with other overseas-based players a week before the first match and was noted as adding speed and power to the squad. After being named to the final squad, it was expected that he would make his senior international debut during the matches, his first appearances for Papua New Guinea at any age group since 2011 at age 15. About representing Papua New Guinea Browne said, "I was born here, I grew up here. I feel Papua New Guinean so I am Papua New Guinean. It’s in my heart to play for this country and I’m glad to be back to play." He made his senior international debut in the first of the two matches. He started and played the first 22 minutes before being sent off for an elbow to the face of Taumihau Tiatia in the eventual 1–3 defeat. Because of the red card, he was not available for the return leg in Tahiti the following week. The Papua New Guinea Football Association appealed to FIFA to rectify what they called, "obvious errors in the referee’s disciplinary decisions...after defender Taumihau Tiatia went down under what appeared to be an innocuous challenge." FIFA acknowledged receipt of the complaint but stated that the case would be submitted to the FIFA Disciplinary Committee when the group met on 20 April 2017. In the meantime, the referee's decision stood and Browne would still miss the next match. Following the review by the Disciplinary Committee, Browne was cleared to play in Papua New Guinea's next match, a qualifier against the Solomon Islands in June 2017.

When Papua New Guinea's squad was announced for 2022 FIFA World Cup qualification, Browne was left out. At the time Papua New Guinea Football Association President John Kapi Natto said that Browne was experiencing passport issues and may never play for the national team again if the problem was not resolved. Formerly Browne played under two passports, British and PNG. When the latter expired, the Papua New Guinea government would not renew it. However, shortly thereafter it was announced that the paperwork was almost resolved and that Browne would be in the squad for qualification.

== Personal life ==
Browne is the son of Bob Browne, an Englishman who moved to Papua New Guinea in 1971 and became the country's most renowned cartoonist by creating Mista Grasruts. Bob Browne died in 2011. His mother, Segana, is a Papua New Guinean from Central Province. Browne has also worked as a building labourer. He also holds a British passport.

== Career statistics ==
=== Club ===
As of 7 August 2022

Appearances and goals by club, season and competition
Club	Season	League			National Cup		Continental		Other		Total	
Club	Season	Division	Apps	Goals	Apps	Goals	Apps	Goals	Apps	Goals	Apps	Goals
Auckland City	2012–13	NZ Football; Championship	9	1	0	0	3	0	0	0	12	1
Auckland City	2013–14	NZ Football; Championship	6	2	0	0	6	0	1 (Note: Appearance in FIFA Club World Cup)	0	13	2
Auckland City	2014–15	NZ Football; Championship	18	7	0	0	4	1	1	0	23	8
Auckland City	Total		33	10	0	0	13	1	2	0	48	11
PEC Zwolle	2015–16	Eredivisie	0	0	0	0	–		–		0	0
FC Groningen	2016–17	Eredivisie	0	0	0	0	–		–		0	0
FC Groningen	2017–18	Eredivisie	0	0	0	0	–		–		0	0
FC Groningen	Total		0	0	0	0	0	0	0	0	0	0
Auckland City	2018–19	NZ Football; Championship	14	6	0	0	–		–		14	6
Auckland City	2019–20	NZ Football; Championship	7	1	0	0	5	6	–		12	7
Auckland City	Total		21	7	0	0	5	6	0	0	26	13
HJK	2020	Veikkausliiga	14	2	8	1	–		–		22	3
HJK	2021	Veikkausliiga	23	4	6	2	13 (Note: Appearances in UEFA Champions League, UEFA Europa League and UEFA Europa Conference League)	0	–		42	6
HJK	2022	Veikkausliiga	14	1	2	0	4 (Note: Appearances in UEFA Champions League and UEFA Europa League)	0	–		20	1
HJK	Total		51	7	16	3	17	0	0	0	84	10
Klubi-04 (loan)	2020	Kakkonen	1	0	0	0	–		–		1	0
Career total			106	24	16	3	35	7	2	0	159	34

=== International ===
As of match played 13 June 2017

Appearances and goals by national team and year
National team	Year	Apps	Goals
Papua New Guinea	2017	3	0
Total		16	0

== Honours ==
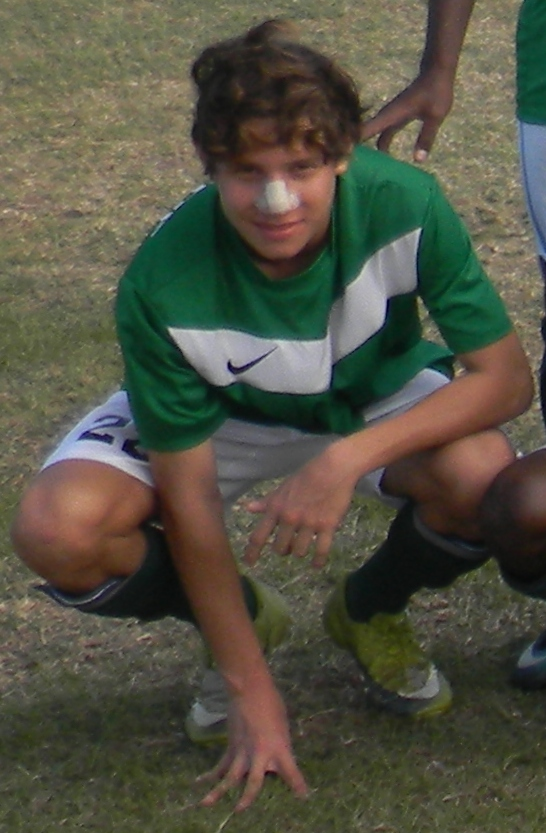
Browne in 2011

Auckland City FC

- OFC Champions League: 2013, 2014, 2015
- FIFA Club World Cup Bronze Medal: 2014
- ASB Premiership: 2014; runner-up: 2013
- ASB Charity Cup: 2013
- OFC President's Cup: 2014

HJK Helsinki

- Veikkausliiga: 2020, 2021, 2022
- Finnish Cup: 2020

Individual

- Central United FC Player's Player of the Year: 2012
- Auckland City FC Young Player of the Year: 2014–15
- Auckland City FC top scorer: 2014–15 (tied with Joao Moreira)
