= Bob Browne =

British and Papua New Guinean cartoonist (died 2011)

- Born: Erith, London, England
- Died: 2 March 2011; Port Moresby, Papua New Guinea
- Known for: Cartoons
- Relatives: David Browne

Bob Browne (died 2011) was a British cartoonist and teacher who was a naturalized citizen and resident of Papua New Guinea (PNG). Initially becoming prominent as a cartoonist in PNG with a series of newspaper advertisements advertising a brand of pick-up trucks and buses, he went on to draw daily cartoons for the Papua New Guinea Post-Courier and also produced several books.

== Early life and education ==
Browne was born in Erith in London. He studied graphic design at the London College of Printing and then worked in different jobs before travelling to Morocco in 1970, where he was shocked by the poverty he saw. This inspired him to apply for a position with the British Voluntary Service Overseas (VSO), which posted him to Wewak in the East Sepik province of PNG, to work with the Wirui Press, run by a Catholic Mission. There, he started to draw cartoons for the Wantok Niuspepa, which was established in 1970 by Francis Mihalic, a member of the Society of the Divine Word, as a weekly newspaper published in PNG's lingua franca, called Tok Pisin, or pidgin.

== Career ==
After two years in Wewak with VSO, Browne moved to Port Moresby, the capital of PNG, where he helped to establish the Centre for Creative Arts in 1972. When it became the National School of Arts, he became head of the Graphics Department.

He first became widely known to the PNG public through a series of cartoons advertising Isuzu motor vehicles. Called Isuzu Lu, the cartoons featured the main character, Lu, and many others in situations where they benefitted from owning or being in Isuzu vehicles. The characters spoke in urban Tok Pisin, were often shown in traditional dress and were usually in overcrowded vehicles, whether pickup trucks or buses. These cartoons led, in 1980, to his being offered space in the Papua New Guinea Post-Courier for a daily cartoon, called Grass Roots. With his instantly recognisable drawing style, Browne portrayed Roots as a rather hopeless, beer-drinking character with a long-suffering wife. Despite his naivety, Roots was able to identify problems in PNG and criticise its shortcomings in a non-aggressive way, not letting his criticisms descend into cruelty.

In 1981 Browne started the Grass Roots Comic Company. As well as cartoons for newspapers, he produced anthologies of his work, such as the Isuzu Lu and Grass Roots cartoons, as well as illustrations for many books and booklets. He produced The Grass Roots Guide to Papua New Guinea Pidgin, in which the Roots character defined in his inimitable way the meaning of terms in Tok Pisin, such as Mauswara (Mouth water), "Like smoke out the exhaust pipe of a bus, it comes out of the mouth of most politicians when somebody turns on their ignition." The definition was accompanied by a cartoon of a bloated politician floating like a balloon.

For some years Browne produced The Grass Roots Offisel Kalenda. In 1991 he collaborated with David Ingram and Peter Henshall to produce an online training manual for journalists that became very popular throughout the South Pacific. Browne also worked as a church pastor, a missionary and as manager of the Port Moresby City Mission, which provides vocational training for young people. He played, coached and supported basketball and soccer. He also served on various government advisory bodies. In 1985 he received Papua New Guinea's 10th Anniversary of Independence Medal for Services to the Community.

== Death ==
Browne died in Port Moresby General Hospital on 2 March 2011. He had married a Papua New Guinean, Segana, who came from Central Province. Their son, David Browne, 15 at the time of his father's death, went on to become a professional footballer, playing for Auckland City in New Zealand and for clubs in the Netherlands and Finland, as well as for the PNG national team.

== Publications ==
Some of Browne's publications are listed below:

- 1981. The Best of Grass Roots, No. 1.
- 1991. Grass Roots Guide to Papua New Guinea Pidgin.
- 1991. The News Manual (originally a book, now online in 3 volumes), with David Ingram and Peter Henshall.
- 2006. Isuzu Lu Book 5.
