= Luis Carlos Murillo =

Colombian footballer (born 1990)

Personal information
- Date of birth: 16 October 1990 (age 36)
- Place of birth: Turbo, Colombia
- Height: 1.70 m (5 ft 7 in)
- Position: Defender

Senior career*
Years	Team	Apps	(Gls)
2010–2016	Once Caldas	117	(0)
2013–2014	→ Deportivo Pasto (loan)	20	(0)
2018–2019	KuPS	53	(0)
2020–2021	HJK	40	(0)
2022	Valletta	3	(0)
2022	Valley United	4	(0)
2022	VPS	7	(0)
- * Club domestic league appearances and goals as of 16 October 2022

Luis Carlos Murillo (born 16 October 1990) is a Colombian footballer who plays as a defender

== Club career ==
Born in Turbo, Colombia, Murillo joined Once Caldas in 2010, making his senior debut in the same season. He went on to win the 2010 Clausura, besides ending second in 2011 Clausura with the club. In order to get more first team appearances, he joined Deportivo Pasto on a loan deal on 12 July 2013

On 16 January 2018, Murillo signed with Finnish club KuPS on a one-year contract. He won the Veikkausliiga with KuPS in 2019.

On 29 October 2019, HJK announced the signing of Murillo on a two-year contract.

== Career statistics ==
As of match played on 2 May 2021

Club	Season	League			Cup		Other		Total	
Club	Season	Division	Apps	Goals	Apps	Goals	Apps	Goals	Apps	Goals
Once Caldas	2010	Categoría Primera A	1	0	0	0	—		1	0
Once Caldas	2011	Categoría Primera A	8	0	9	0	0	0	17	0
Once Caldas	2012	Categoría Primera A	22	0	8	0	—		30	0
Once Caldas	2013	Categoría Primera A	4	0	7	1	—		11	1
Once Caldas	2014	Categoría Primera A	19	0	5	0	—		24	0
Once Caldas	2015	Categoría Primera A	21	0	6	0	1 (Note: Appearance in Copa Libertadores)	0	28	0
Once Caldas	2016	Categoría Primera A	35	0	6	0	—		41	0
Once Caldas	2017	Categoría Primera A	7	0	1	0	—		8	0
Once Caldas	Total		117	0	42	1	1	0	160	1
Deportivo Pasto (loan)	2013	Categoría Primera A	11	0	0	0	5 (Note: Appearances in Copa Sudamericana)	1	16	1
Deportivo Pasto (loan)	2014	Categoría Primera A	9	0	0	0	—		9	0
Deportivo Pasto (loan)	Total		20	0	0	0	5	1	25	1
KuPS	2018	Veikkausliiga	27	0	4	0	2 (Note: Appearances in UEFA Europa League qualifying rounds)	0	33	0
KuPS	2019	Veikkausliiga	26	0	4	0	4	0	34	0
KuPS	Total		53	0	8	0	6	0	67	0
HJK	2020	Veikkausliiga	20	0	9	0	—		29	0
HJK	2021	Veikkausliiga	20	0	6	0	13 (Note: Appearances in the UEFA Champions League, UEFA Europa League and UEFA Conference League)	0	39	0
HJK	Total		40	0	15	0	13	0	68	0
Valletta	2021–22	Maltese Premier League	3	0	1	0	–		4	0
Valley United	2022	NISA	4	0	1	0	–		5	0
VPS	2022	Veikkausliiga	7	0	–		–		7	0
Career total			244	0	67	1	25	1	336	2

== Honours ==
KuPS

- Veikkausliiga: 2019

Individual

- Veikkausliiga Defender of the Year: 2019
- Veikkausliiga Team of the Year: 2019, 2020, 2021, 2022
