= Iiro Järvinen =

Finnish footballer (born 1996)

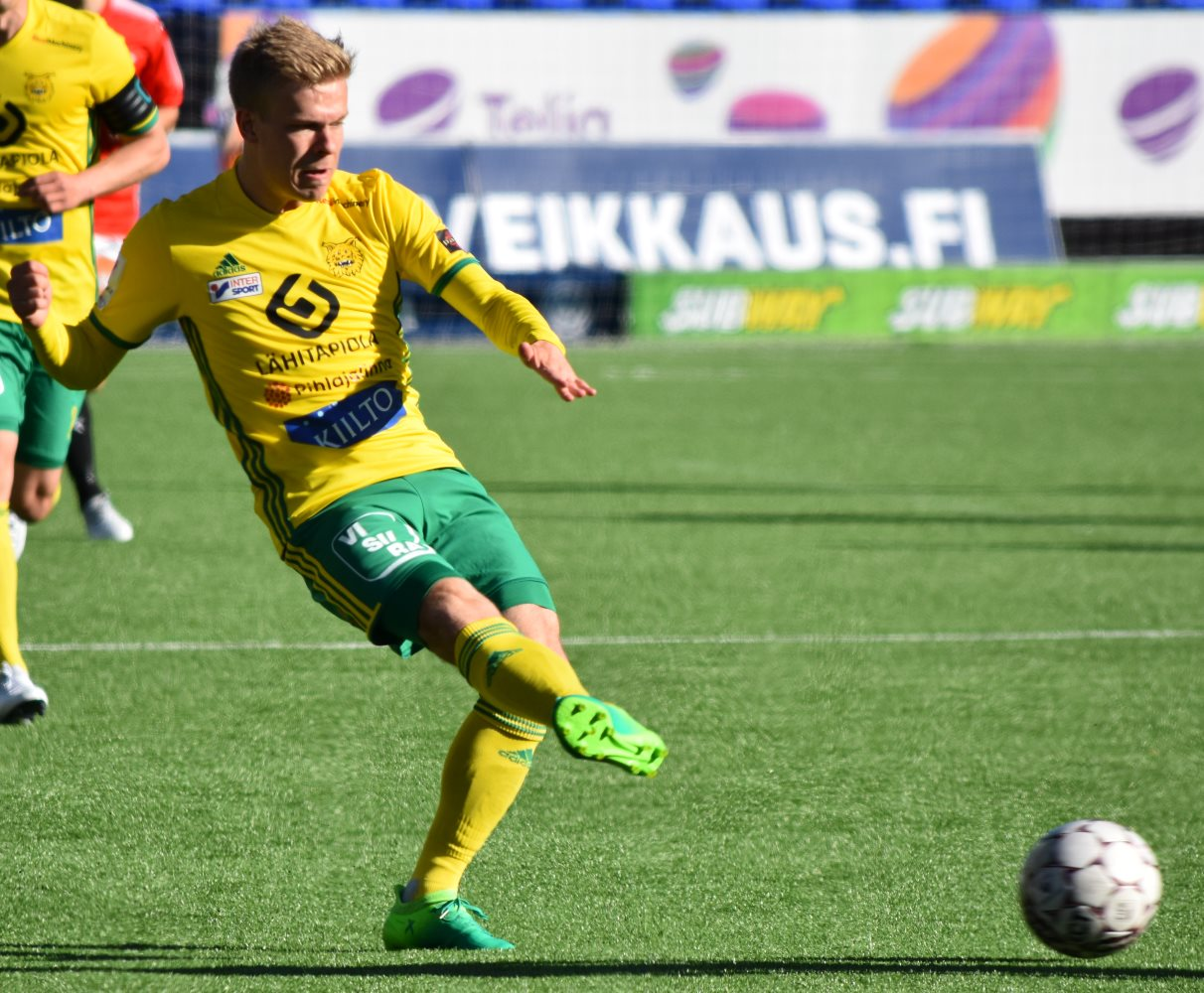
- Järvinen with Ilves in 2017

Personal information
- Date of birth: 3 November 1996 (age 30)
- Place of birth: Jyväskylä, Finland
- Height: 1.72 m (5 ft 7 1/2 in)
- Position: Midfielder

Team information
- Current team: Inter Turku
- Number: 19

Youth career
- 2008–2010: Urho
- 2011–2015: JJK

Senior career*
| Years | Team | Apps | (Gls) |
| 2013–2016 | JJK | 51 | (7) |
| 2017–2020 | Ilves | 99 | (6) |
| 2021–2022 | KuPS | 19 | (0) |
| 2023– | Inter Turku | 77 | (5) |

International career^{‡}
| 2014 | Finland U18 | 4 | (0) |
| 2017 | Finland U21 | 4 | (0) |
- * Club domestic league appearances and goals as of 12 November 2026 ‡ National team caps and goals as of 8 June 2017

Iiro Järvinen (born 3 November 1996) is a Finnish professional footballer who plays as a midfielder for Veikkausliiga club Inter Turku.

== Club career ==
On 16 November 2022, Järvinen signed a contract for 2023 and 2024 seasons with Inter Turku. On 27 September 2024, his deal was extended for the 2025 with an option for 2026.

== Career statistics ==
As of 12 November 2026

Appearances and goals by club, season and competition
| Club | Season | League | | | Cup | | League cup | | Europe | | Total | |
| Club | Season | Division | Apps | Goals | Apps | Goals | Apps | Goals | Apps | Goals | Apps | Goals |
|---|---|---|---|---|---|---|---|---|---|---|---|---|
| JJK | 2013 | Veikkausliiga | 1 | 0 | – | | – | | – | | 1 | 0 |
| JJK | 2014 | Ykkönen | 2 | 0 | 2 | 0 | – | | – | | 4 | 0 |
| JJK | 2015 | Ykkönen | 26 | 2 | 1 | 0 | – | | – | | 27 | 2 |
| JJK | 2016 | Ykkönen | 22 | 5 | 3 | 1 | – | | – | | 25 | 6 |
| JJK | Total | | 51 | 7 | 6 | 1 | 0 | 0 | 0 | 0 | 57 | 8 |
| Villiketut | 2016 | Kolmonen | 1 | 0 | – | | – | | – | | 1 | 0 |
| Ilves | 2017 | Veikkausliiga | 30 | 1 | 6 | 1 | – | | – | | 36 | 2 |
| Ilves | 2018 | Veikkausliiga | 30 | 4 | 6 | 1 | – | | 2 (Note: Appearances in UEFA Europa League) | 0 | 38 | 5 |
| Ilves | 2019 | Veikkausliiga | 22 | 1 | 7 | 1 | – | | – | | 29 | 2 |
| Ilves | 2020 | Veikkausliiga | 17 | 0 | 5 | 1 | – | | – | | 22 | 1 |
| Ilves | Total | | 99 | 6 | 24 | 4 | 0 | 0 | 2 | 0 | 125 | 10 |
| KuPS | 2021 | Veikkausliiga | 10 | 0 | 3 | 0 | – | | 2 (Note: Appearances in UEFA Conference League) | 0 | 15 | 0 |
| KuPS | 2022 | Veikkausliiga | 9 | 0 | 3 | 1 | 2 | 0 | 0 | 0 | 14 | 1 |
| KuPS | Total | | 19 | 0 | 6 | 1 | 2 | 0 | 2 | 0 | 29 | 1 |
| KuFu-98 | 2021 | Kakkonen | 1 | 0 | – | | – | | – | | 1 | 0 |
| KuPS Akatemia | 2022 | Kakkonen | 2 | 2 | – | | – | | – | | 2 | 2 |
| Inter Turku | 2023 | Veikkausliiga | 26 | 1 | 3 | 1 | 6 | 0 | – | | 35 | 2 |
| Inter Turku | 2024 | Veikkausliiga | 28 | 3 | 6 | 0 | 4 | 0 | – | | 38 | 3 |
| Inter Turku | 2025 | Veikkausliiga | 12 | 1 | 0 | 0 | 7 | 2 | – | | 7 | 2 |
| Inter Turku | 2026 | Veikkausliiga | 11 | 0 | 2 | 0 | 0 | 0 | 5 | 0 | 7 | 2 |
| Inter Turku | Total | | 77 | 5 | 11 | 1 | 17 | 2 | 5 | 0 | 100 | 8 |
| Career total | | | 250 | 20 | 47 | 7 | 19 | 2 | 9 | 0 | 325 | 29 |

== Honours ==
Ilves

- Finnish Cup: 2019

KuPS

- Veikkausliiga runner-up: 2021, 2022
- Finnish Cup: 2021, 2022

Inter Turku

- Finnish Cup runner-up: 2024
- Finnish League Cup: 2024, 2025
