= Jasin-Amin Assehnoun =

Finnish footballer (born 1998)

Personal information
- Date of birth: 26 December 1998 (age 27)
- Place of birth: Tampere, Finland
- Height: 1.76 m (5 ft 9 in)
- Position: Left winger

Youth career
- –2012: HJK
- 2012–2014: PK-35
- 2014: PK-35 Vantaa
- 2015: HJK
- 2015: PK-35 Vantaa
- 2016–2017: Espoo

Senior career*
Years	Team	Apps	(Gls)
2017–2018	Espoo	35	(11)
2018–2021	Lahti	69	(17)
2021–2023	Emmen	69	(9)
2023–2024	Vejle	13	(1)
2024	→ Volos (loan)	14	(3)
2024–2026	Volos	40	(1)
2026	Omonia Aradippou	12	(3)

International career
2019–2020	Finland U21	13	(2)
2021	Finland	2	(0)
- * Club domestic league appearances and goals as of 02nd August 2026

Jasin-Amin Assehnoun (born 26 December 1998) is a Finnish professional footballer who plays as a left winger.

== Club career ==
In his youth years, Assehnoun played for Pitäjänmäen Tarmo, HJK Helsinki, Pallokerho-35, PK-35 Vantaa and FC Espoo. His first senior team was FC Espoo, competing in the third-tier Kakkonen. In 2018, Assehnoun joined Veikkausliiga side FC Lahti, signing an initial two-year contract with the club.

In July 2021, he signed a one-year contract with Dutch club FC Emmen.

In July 2023, Assehnoun joined newly promoted Danish club Vejle on a two-year deal. After half a year at Vejle, Assehnoun was loaned out to Super League Greece side Volos FC until June 2024 without any purchase options. In the summer of 2024, Assehnoun returned to Vejle. On 5 July 2024, he signed with Volos on a permanent deal for an undisclosed fee.

== International career ==
A former youth international, Assehnoun was called up to the Finland national football team for the UEFA Euro 2020 pre-tournament friendly match against Sweden on 29 May 2021. He made his national team debut in that game, as a starter.

On 25 May 2022, it was reported that Assehnoun had declined an invitation from the Finland national team head coach Markku Kanerva, and had considered switching his allegiance to represent Morocco. On 14 September 2022, it was confirmed by Kanerva that Assehnoun was aiming for the Morocco national team.

== Personal life ==
Assehnoun was born in Tampere, Finland, to a Moroccan father and a Finnish mother and holds dual Finnish-Moroccan citizenship. His younger brother Hamza Assehnoun is also a footballer, who plays for EBK.

== Career statistics ==
=== Club ===
As of 22 March 2025

Appearances and goals by club, season and competition
Club	Season	League			National cup (Note: Includes Suomen Cup, KNVB Cup, Danish Cup and Greek Cup)		Europe		Other		Total	
Club	Season	Division	Apps	Goals	Apps	Goals	Apps	Goals	Apps	Goals	Apps	Goals
Espoo	2017	Kakkonen	22	3	0	0	—		—		22	3
Espoo	2018	Kakkonen	13	8	0	0	—		—		13	8
Espoo	Total		35	11	0	0	0	0	0	0	35	11
Lahti	2018	Veikkausliiga	10	0	0	0	—		—		10	0
Lahti	2019	Veikkausliiga	27	3	7	2	—		—		34	5
Lahti	2020	Veikkausliiga	22	9	8	3	—		—		30	12
Lahti	2021	Veikkausliiga	10	5	3	2	—		—		13	7
Lahti	Total		69	17	18	7	0	0	0	0	87	24
Emmen	2021–22	Eerste Divisie	36	7	2	1	—		—		38	8
Emmen	2022–23	Eredivisie	33	2	3	0	—		—		36	2
Emmen	Total		69	9	5	1	0	0	0	0	74	10
Vejle	2023–24	Danish Superliga	13	1	2	2	—		—		15	3
Volos (loan)	2023–24	Super League Greece	14	3	0	0	—		—		14	3
Volos	2024–25	Super League Greece	22	1	2	0	—		—		24	1
Career total			222	42	27	10	0	0	0	0	249	52

=== International ===
As of match played 1 September 2021

Finland
Year	Apps	Goals
2021	2	0
Total	2	0

== Honours ==
Emmen

- Eerste Divisie: 2021–22
