= Joel Untersee =

Swiss footballer (born 1994)

Personal information
- Date of birth: 11 February 1994 (age 32)
- Place of birth: Johannesburg, South Africa
- Height: 1.81 m (5 ft 11 1/2 in)
- Position: Defender

Youth career
- 2008–2010: Zürich
- 2010–2013: Juventus

Senior career*
Years	Team	Apps	(Gls)
2013–2018	Juventus	0	(0)
2013–2016	→ Vaduz (loan)	58	(1)
2016–2017	→ Brescia (loan)	39	(0)
2017–2018	→ Empoli (loan)	15	(0)
2018–2019	Empoli	3	(0)
2019	→ Zürich (loan)	8	(0)
2020	FC Lugano	1	(0)
2021	HJK	0	(0)

International career^{‡}
2009	Switzerland U15	4	(1)
2009–2010	Switzerland U16	9	(0)
2010–2011	Switzerland U17	10	(1)
2011–2012	Switzerland U18	4	(0)
2012–2013	Switzerland U19	4	(0)
2013	Switzerland U20	4	(0)
2014–2016	Switzerland U21	2	(0)
- * Club domestic league appearances and goals as of 10 June 2019 ‡ National team caps and goals as of 3 July 2014

Joel Untersee (born 11 February 1994) is a Swiss footballer who played as a defender.

== Club career ==
=== Early career ===
Born in Johannesburg, South Africa, of Swiss descent, Untersee moved to Switzerland at a very young age and opted to represent Switzerland at various youth levels internationally. Following his move, Untersee joined the youth academy of FC Zürich, where he would eventually remain until 2010, before transferring to Italian giants, Juventus Football Club during the 2010–11 season.

=== Juventus ===
On 28 October 2010, Untersee officially left FC Zürich to join Juventus, where he was assigned to the youth team. After a successful debut season in Italy, Untersee was called up to the first team training camp in the summer 2011 by new head coach Antonio Conte. Following the summer ritiro, however, the young fullback returned to the youth sector for the 2011–12 season and remained during the 2012–13 campaign as well.

On 1 January 2014, Juventus confirmed that Untersee had left them for FC Vaduz on a six-month loan deal that would expire on 30 June 2014. Instantly making an impact with his new team, Untersee made his first appearance against FC Lugano in a 2–0 home victory on 3 February 2014. He went on to make 15 league appearances. Additionally, he scored his first goal for his new club in an 8–0 victory over FC Ruggell in the Liechtenstein Football Cup. On 3 July 2014, Juventus and Vaduz reached an agreement to prolong the loan deal for another season.

=== Brescia ===
On 31 August 2016, Untersee completed a move to Italian club Brescia on a loan deal from Juventus for the full season. He made his debut in a 2–0 Serie B win over Frosinone, playing the full 90 minutes

=== Empoli ===
After one year contract, in January 2019, he was loaned to Zürich until the end of the season.

=== HJK ===
On 19 January 2021, Untersee signed a one-year contract with HJK. Untersee left HJK on 23 July 2021 by mutual consent, having made four appearances for the club in the Finnish Cup.

== International career ==
Untersee had represented Switzerland at youth levels.

On 6 March 2018, the South African National Team Coach Stuart Baxter announced that Untersee has agreed to represent Bafana Bafana at international level. He explained his absence from the Bafana Bafana in the spring 2018 friendlies was due to Empoli's fixtures and the importance of achieving promotion.

In May 2019 he was added to South Africa's provisional 30-man squad for the Africa Cup of Nations, although he still had not obtained a South African passport by that time.
