= Daniel O'Shaughnessy =

Finnish footballer (born 1994)

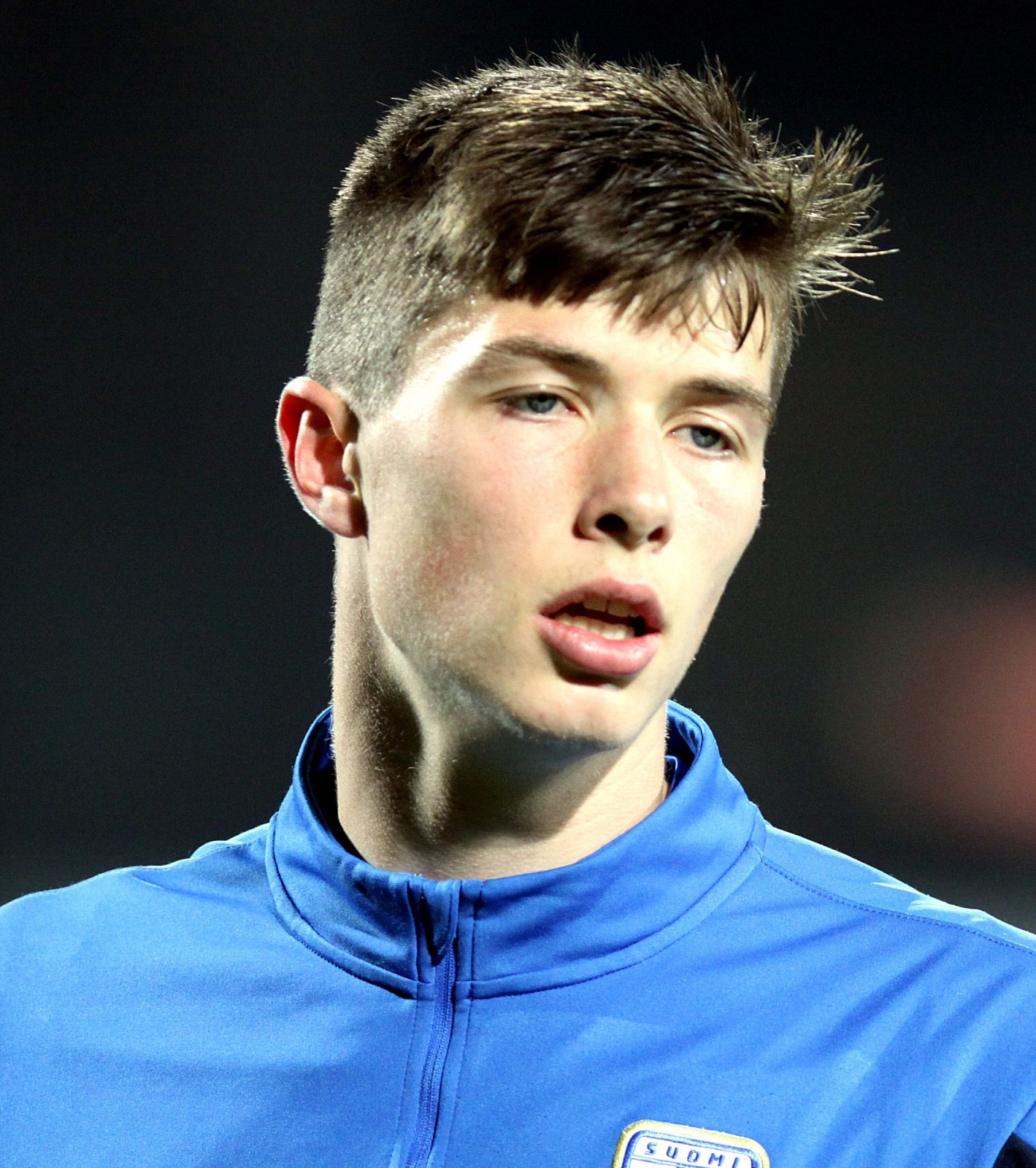
- O'Shaughnessy with Finland U21 in 2015

Personal information
- Full name: Daniel Michael O'Shaughnessy
- Date of birth: 14 September 1994 (age 32)
- Place of birth: Riihimäki, Finland
- Height: 1.90 m (6 ft 3 in)
- Positions: Centre-back; left back

Youth career
- 1998–2002: RiNS
- 2003–2008: Honka
- 2009–2011: HJK
- 2012–2014: Metz

Senior career*
Years	Team	Apps	(Gls)
2011	Klubi 04	23	(3)
2012–2014	Metz B	40	(1)
2014–2016	Brentford	0	(0)
2015	→ Braintree Town (loan)	1	(0)
2016	→ Midtjylland (loan)	1	(0)
2016–2018	Cheltenham Town	37	(3)
2018–2021	HJK	83	(5)
2022–2024	Karlsruher SC	13	(1)
2024–2026	HJK	13	(0)

International career^{‡}
2009	Finland U15	3	(0)
2009–2010	Finland U16	13	(0)
2010	Finland U17	7	(0)
2011–2012	Finland U18	14	(1)
2013–2014	Finland U20	2	(1)
2013–2016	Finland U21	14	(2)
2016–2024	Finland	23	(1)
Medal record
Men's football
Klubi-04
First place	Kakkonen	2011
HJK
Second place	Finnish Cup	2018
First place	Veikkausliiga	2018
First place	Veikkausliiga	2020
- * Club domestic league appearances and goals as of 19 November 2025 ‡ National team caps and goals as of 22 November 2024

Daniel Michael O'Shaughnessy (born 14 September 1994) is a Finnish former professional footballer who played as a defender.

O'Shaughnessy began his career in the youth systems at Honka, HJK and Metz and also played in England for Braintree Town and Cheltenham Town. After rising to prominence and winning three Veikkausliiga championships during his second spell with HJK, he transferred to German club Karlsruher SC in 2022. Following a 2 1/2-year spell interrupted by career-threatening hip injuries, O'Shaughnessy returned to HJK in 2024.

== Early life ==
O'Shaughnessy was born in Riihimäki on 14 September 1994, the son of a Finnish mother and an Irish father (Robert, a painter from Galway). He holds dual Finnish-Irish citizenship. His older brother Patrick is a former professional footballer.

== Youth career ==
A central defender, O'Shaughnessy began his career in Finland alongside his brother Patrick at Honka and was part of the youth team which made an impressive showing at the 2008 Nike Premier Cup. Both brothers joined Veikkausliiga club HJK in early 2009. O'Shaughnessy broke into the club's reserve team the following year and made 23 appearances, scoring two goals, during the 2011 Kakkonen season. The club missed out on promotion to the Ykkönen, after a playoff semi-final defeat to BK-46.

== Club career ==
=== Metz B ===
After trials at Premier League clubs Liverpool, Manchester United, Sunderland and Scottish Premier League club Celtic, O'Shaughnessy moved to French Ligue 2 club Metz on a 2 1/2-year contract in early January 2012. He made 40 appearances and scored one goal for the club's reserve team and helped the team to the 2013–14 Championnat de France amateur 2 Group C title. O'Shaughnessy departed Metz at the end of the 2013–14 season, having failed to receive a call into the first team squad.

=== Brentford ===
O'Shaughnessy joined newly promoted Championship club Brentford on trial in July 2014 and made a 30-minute cameo in a 4–0 pre-season friendly defeat to Osasuna on 29 July. On 1 August, it was announced that O'Shaughnessy had signed a two-year professional contract. He was an unused substitute during Brentford's two League Cup ties in August 2014, but instead spent the 2014–15 season in the Development Squad, for which he made 23 appearances and scored one goal.

O'Shaughnessy began the 2015–16 season in the Development Squad and joined National League club Braintree Town on a one-month loan on 22 September 2015. His only appearance for the club came later that day as a half time substitute for Sam Habergham during a 2–1 win over Woking.

Following another spell back with the Brentford Development Squad, O'Shaughnessy joined Danish Superliga club Midtjylland on loan until the end of the 2015–16 season in late January 2016. He made one appearance, when he replaced Kian Hansen after 59 minutes of a 4–1 victory over Nordsjælland on the final day of the season. O'Shaughnessy was released by Brentford in May 2016, after failing to make a first team appearance during his two seasons at Griffin Park.

=== Cheltenham Town ===
On 12 July 2016, O'Shaughnessy signed a one-year contract with League Two newcomers Cheltenham Town. During a 2016–17 season in which the Robins narrowly avoided being relegated straight back into non-League football, he made 36 appearances and scored four goals. O'Shaughnessy signed a new one-year contract in June 2017, but he was down the defensive pecking order during the first half of the 2017–18 season and he departed the club on 2 January 2018. O'Shaughnessy made 49 appearances and scored four goals during 18 months at Whaddon Road.

=== HJK ===
On 2 January 2018, O'Shaughnessy returned to Finland to re-join reigning Veikkausliiga champions HJK on a two-year contract, with the option of a further year. Despite missing the final three months of the 2018 season with a knee injury, O'Shaughnessy made 24 appearances, scored three goals and in his absence, HJK were crowned Veikkausliiga champions. O'Shaughnessy was a near ever-present during the 2019 season and finished the campaign with 31 appearances and three goals.

During a period while he was conducting his national service, O'Shaughnessy signed a new two-year contract in October 2019 and made 28 appearances during HJK's double-winning 2020 season. O'Shaughnessy made 35 appearances and scored one goal during the 2021 season, in which he captained the team to the Veikkausliiga championship. 2021 was O'Shaughnessy's final season at the Bolt Arena and he ended what would be his first spell with the club on 118 appearances and 9 goals. In each of his final two seasons with the club, O'Shaughnessy was voted the Veikkausliiga Defender of the Year and into the Veikkausliiga Team of the Year.

=== Karlsruher SC ===
On 30 August 2021, it was announced that O'Shaughnessy would transfer to 2. Bundesliga club Karlsruher SC on 1 December 2021 and sign a contract running until June 2024. He finished a mid-table 2021–22 season with 15 appearances and one goal, before suffering a fractured fibula on international duty in June 2022. O'Shaughnessy returned to fitness in mid-November 2022, but he failed to make an appearance prior to undergoing season-ending surgery on a hip problem in March 2023.

O'Shaughnessy undertook his rehabilitation in Finland and returned to continue it with the club in October 2023. On 14 March 2024, it was reported that O'Shaughnessy's professional career was in jeopardy due to consecutive injuries and two hip surgeries, but one month later it was reported that he had returned to training. O'Shaughnessy failed to win a call into a matchday squad before the end of the 2023–24 season and was released when his contract expired.

=== Return to HJK ===
On 1 July 2024, O'Shaughnessy returned to his former club HJK and signed a contract until the end of the 2025 season on a free transfer. O'Shaughnessy suffered a collarbone injury in training in July, but eventually on 18 August, he made his first competitive club appearance in over two years, as a starter for HJK in a 3–0 away win over Ekenäs IF (EIF). During the next pre-season, on 15 January 2025, his contract was extended until the end of 2026. O'Shaughnessy assumed the HJK captaincy for the 2025 season, having acted in the same role previously in 2021. On 25 April 2026, O'Shaughnessy announced his retirement from his professional career.

== International career ==
O'Shaughnessy represented Finland at all age-groups from U15 up to U21 level. He won his maiden call into the senior team for a friendly versus Estonia on 9 June 2015, but remained an unused substitute during the 2–0 defeat. O'Shaughnessy made his full international debut as a late substitute for Ville Jalasto in a 3–0 friendly defeat to Sweden in Abu Dhabi on 10 January 2016. He made his first start three days later versus Iceland and played the full 90 minutes of a 1–0 defeat.

Two years after his maiden call-up to the senior team, O'Shaughnessy won his third cap as a half time substitute in a 2–1 friendly win over Jordan on 11 January 2018. He won his first competitive cap with a start in a 1–0 2020–21 UEFA Nations League B defeat to Wales on 3 September 2020. O'Shaughnessy was named in the Finland squad for Euro 2020 and was the only domestic-based player in the selection. He started in each of the Finns' three group stage matches, prior to the team's elimination. He scored his first goal for Finland in a 3–1 2022 World Cup qualifying win over Bosnia and Herzegovina on 13 November 2021.

== Career statistics ==
=== Club ===
As of 26 April 2026

Appearances and goals by club, season and competition
Club	Season	League			National cup (Note: Includes FA Cup, Finnish Cup, DFB-Pokal)		League cup (Note: Includes EFL Cup and Finnish League Cup)		Europe		Other		Total	
Club	Season	Division	Apps	Goals	Apps	Goals	Apps	Goals	Apps	Goals	Apps	Goals	Apps	Goals
Klubi-04	2011	Kakkonen Group A	23	2	—		—		—		—		23	2
Metz B	2011–12	CFA Group B	3	0	—		—		—		—		3	0
Metz B	2012–13	CFA Group A	20	0	—		—		—		—		20	0
Metz B	2013–14	CFA 2 Group C	17	1	—		—		—		—		17	1
Metz B	Total		40	1	—		—		—		—		40	1
Brentford	2014–15	Championship	0	0	0	0	0	0	—		0	0	0	0
Braintree Town (loan)	2015–16	National League	1	0	—		—		—		—		1	0
Midtjylland (loan)	2015–16	Danish Superliga	1	0	—		—		—		0	0	1	0
Cheltenham Town	2016–17	League Two	27	3	2	0	2	0	—		5 (Note: Appearances in EFL Trophy)	1	36	4
Cheltenham Town	2017–18	League Two	10	0	0	0	1	0	—		2	0	13	0
Cheltenham Town	Total		37	3	2	0	3	0	—		7	1	49	4
HJK	2018	Veikkausliiga	17	2	5	1	—		2 (Note: Appearances in Champions League)	0	—		24	3
HJK	2019	Veikkausliiga	24	2	0	0	—		5 (Note: 3 appearances and 1 goal in Champions League, 2 appearances in Europa League)	1	2 (Note: Appearances in Veikkausliiga European play-offs)	0	31	3
HJK	2020	Veikkausliiga	21	0	7	2	—		—		—		28	2
HJK	2021	Veikkausliiga	19	1	4	0	—		12 (Note: 4 appearances in Champions League, 4 appearances in Europa League, 4 appearances in Europa Conference League)	0	—		35	1
HJK	Total		81	5	16	3	—		19	1	2	0	118	9
Karlsruher SC	2021–22	2. Bundesliga	13	1	2	0	—		—		—		15	1
Karlsruher SC	2022–23	2. Bundesliga	0	0	0	0	—		—		—		0	0
Karlsruher SC	Total		13	1	2	0	—		—		—		15	1
HJK	2024	Veikkausliiga	8	0	0	0	0	0	8 (Note: Appearance(s) in UEFA Conference League)	0	—		16	0
HJK	2025	Veikkausliiga	5	0	1	0	4	0	0	0	–		10	0
HJK	2026	Veikkausliiga	0	0	0	0	0	0	0	0	0	0	0	0
HJK	Total		13	0	1	0	4	0	8	0	0	0	26	0
Career total			209	12	21	3	7	0	27	1	9	1	270	17

=== International ===
As of match played 17 November 2024

Appearances and goals by national team and year
National team	Year	Apps	Goals
Finland	2016	2	0
Finland	2018	1	0
Finland	2020	5	0
Finland	2021	10	1
Finland	2022	4	0
Finland	2023	0	0
Finland	2024	1	0
Total		23	1

Scores and results list Finland's goal tally first, score column indicates score after each O'Shaughnessy goal.

List of international goals scored by Daniel O'Shaughnessy
No.	Date	Venue	Opponent	Score	Result	Competition
1	13 November 2021	Bilino Polje Stadium, Zenica, Bosnia and Herzegovina	Bosnia and Herzegovina	3–1	3–1	2022 FIFA World Cup qualification

== Honours ==
Klubi 04

- Kakkonen Group A: 2011

Metz B

- Championnat de France Amateur 2 Group C: 2013–14

HJK

- Veikkausliiga: 2018, 2020, 2021
- Finnish Cup: 2020, 2025

Individual

- Veikkausliiga Defender of the Year: 2020, 2021
- Veikkausliiga Team of the Year: 2020, 2021
