= 2021 Finnish Cup =

Tournament details
- Country: Finland
- Teams: 24

Final positions
- Champions: KuPS
- Runners-up: HJK Helsinki

Tournament statistics
- Matches played: 42
- Goals scored: 121 (2.88 per match)

The 2021 Finnish Cup is the 67th season of the Finnish Cup football competition.

Until the 2017–2018 season, the tournament was held in the autumn-spring schedule from July to September of the following year. The introduction of this new format of the contest meant that the League Cup was suspended.

The winner of the Finnish Cup qualifies for the 2022–23 UEFA Europa Conference League.

== Teams ==
Round	Dates	Clubs involved	Winners from previous round	New entries this round	Leagues entering this round
First round (group stage)	6 – 28 February 2021	24	-	24	Veikkausliiga (12), Ykkönen (12).
Play-off Round	6 – 28 March 2021	10	8	2	Kakkonen (2)
Quarter-finals	20 March – 3 April 2021	8	3 (group stage); 5 (play off)	–	
Semi-finals	10 April 2021	4	4	–	
Finals	8 May 2021	2	2	–	

== Group stage ==
The teams participating in the group stage were the teams of Veikkausliiga and Ykkönen. The group stage was played in February 2021 with teams divided into 6 divisional groups, three groups with Veikkausliiga and three groups with Ykkönen teams. The winners of the Veikkausliiga groups qualify for the quarter-finals, the second teams of these groups will play the playoffs. The winners and the best 2 runners up of the Ykkönen groups qualify for the playoffs.

=== Veikkausliiga – Group A ===
Team	Pld	W	D	L	GF	GA	GD	Pts	Qualification
HJK	3	2	1	0	9	3	+6	7	Quarter-finals
HIFK	3	2	0	1	3	2	+1	6	Play-off
FC Lahti	3	1	1	1	4	2	+2	4	
KTP	3	0	0	3	1	10	−9	0	

=== Veikkausliiga – Group B ===
Team	Pld	W	D	L	GF	GA	GD	Pts	Qualification
Inter Turku	3	3	0	0	5	0	+5	9	Quarter-finals
Honka	3	1	1	1	3	4	−1	4	Play-off
FC Haka	3	1	0	2	3	2	+1	3	
IFK Mariehamn	3	0	1	2	2	7	−5	1	

=== Veikkausliiga – Group C ===
Team	Pld	W	D	L	GF	GA	GD	Pts	Qualification
KuPS	3	3	0	0	8	2	+6	9	Quarter-finals
SJK	3	2	0	1	6	5	+1	6	Play-off
AC Oulu	3	1	0	2	2	3	−1	3	
FC Ilves	3	0	0	3	1	7	−6	0	

=== Ykkönen – Group A ===
Team	Pld	W	D	L	GF	GA	GD	Pts	Qualification
Gnistan	3	2	1	0	10	2	+8	7	Play-off
MP	3	1	1	1	7	5	+2	4	
Klubi 04	3	1	0	2	3	6	−3	3	
JIPPO	3	1	0	2	1	8	−7	3	

=== Ykkönen – Group B ===
Team	Pld	W	D	L	GF	GA	GD	Pts	Qualification
PK-35	3	2	1	0	6	3	+3	7	Play-off
Ekenäs IF	3	2	0	1	2	2	0	6	Play-off
TPS Turku	3	1	1	1	4	3	+1	4	
MuSa	3	0	0	3	1	5	−4	0	

=== Ykkönen – Group C ===
Team	Pld	W	D	L	GF	GA	GD	Pts	Qualification
VPS	3	2	1	0	7	2	+5	7	Play-off
RoPS	3	2	0	1	4	5	−1	6	Play-off
FF Jaro	3	1	0	2	4	6	−2	3	
KPV	3	0	1	2	3	5	−2	1	

== Play-off Round ==
In the playoff round, 2 teams from Kakkonen (PEPO and SJK Akatemia), wil enter the tournament.

6 March 2021	SJK Akatemia (3)	0–3	SJK (1)	Wallsport Areena, Seinäjoki
14:30		Report

13 March 2021	VPS (2)	0–4	Honka (1)	Elisa Stadion, Vaasa
13:00		Report

13 March 2021	PEPO (3)	0–3	PK-35 (2)	Amiksen tekonurmi, Lappeenranta
14:30		Report

13 March 2021	Gnistan (2)	3–2 AET	EIF (2)	Mustapekka Areena, Helsinki
17:00		Report

28 March 2021	RoPS (2)	0-1	HIFK (1)	Rovaniemen keskuskenttä, Rovaniemi
17:00		Report

== Quarter-finals ==
20 March 2021	KuPS (1)	5-0	Gnistan (2)	Savon Sanomat Areena, Kuopio
13:00		Report

3 April 2021	Honka (1)	1-0 AET	PK-35 (2)	Tapiolan Urheilupuisto, Espoo
14:00		Report

3 April 2021	HIFK (1)	0-3	HJK (1)	Veritas Stadion, Turku
16:00		Report

3 April 2021	Inter Turku (1)	1-0 AET	SJK (1)	Bolt Arena, Helsinki
16:00		Report

== Semi-finals ==
10 April 2021	KuPS (1)	2-1	Honka (1)	Savon Sanomat Areena, Kuopio
14:00		Report

10 April 2021	HJK (1)	4-0	Inter Turku (1)	Bolt Arena, Helsinki
16:00		Report

== Final ==
8 May 2021	HJK (1)	0-0 (a.e.t.) (4-5 p)	KuPS (1)	Helsinki Olympic Stadium, Helsinki
16:00	Riski (yellow card) 4'; Debohi (yellow card) 60'	Report	Carrillo (yellow card) 32' (yellow-red card) 63'; Adjei-Boateng (yellow card) 102'; Uzochukwu (yellow card) 115'	Attendance: 0 Referee: Oskari Hämäläinen
	Penalties
	Riski (penalty scored); O'Shaughnessy (penalty scored); Tanaka (penalty scored); Henrique (penalty missed); Valenčič (penalty scored)		(penalty scored) Adjei-Boateng; (penalty scored) Popovitch; (penalty scored) Udo; (penalty scored) Tomas; (penalty scored) Järvinen
