= Baba Mensah =

Ghanaian footballer (born 1994)

Personal information
- Date of birth: 20 August 1994 (age 32)
- Place of birth: Accra, Ghana
- Height: 1.90 m (6 ft 3 in)
- Position: Defender

Senior career*
Years	Team	Apps	(Gls)
2014–2017	Inter Allies FC		
2016	→ BK Häcken (loan)	8	(0)
2017	→ Viborg FF (loan)	0	(0)
2017–2021	Ilves	48	(1)
2021	Klubi 04	13	(0)
2022	IFK Mariehamn	17	(1)
2023	VPS	17	(0)
2024	TPS	11	(0)

International career^{‡}
2013	Ghana U20	1	(0)
2015–	Ghana	1	(0)
- * Club domestic league appearances and goals as of 21 July 2023 ‡ National team caps and goals as of 19:59, 1 October 2015 (UTC)

Baba Mensah (born 20 August 1994) is a Ghanaian footballer who most recently played as a defender for TPS in the Finnish Ykkösliiga.

== Club career ==
He joined Ilves in the Finnish Veikkausliiga for the 2017 season.

Before the 2022 season, he moved to another Finnish club IFK Mariehamn.

On 3 February 2023, Mensah signed a one-year deal with VPS, after a three-week tryout.

On 15 December 2023, Mensah signed with Ykkösliiga club TPS on a one-year deal with an option for one more.

== Honours ==
=== Individual ===
- Veikkausliiga Team of the Year: 2019
