= Luís Henrique (footballer, born 1998) =

Brazilian footballer

Personal information
- Full name: Luís Henrique Farinhas Taffner
- Date of birth: 17 March 1998 (age 28)
- Place of birth: Vila Velha, Brazil
- Height: 1.82 m (6 ft 0 in)
- Position: Forward

Team information
- Current team: Magenta

Youth career
- 2010: CFZ Rio
- 2011–2013: Flamengo
- 2013–2015: Botafogo

Senior career*
Years	Team	Apps	(Gls)
2015–2016	Botafogo	20	(4)
2017	Atlético Paranaense	0	(0)
2017	Feirense	4	(0)
2018–2019	Nacional-SP		
2018–2019	→ Grêmio FBPA (loan)	0	(0)
2019	Oeste	0	(0)
2019	HIFK	14	(8)
2020–2022	Vejle	5	(0)
2020	→ HIFK (loan)	11	(4)
2021	→ HJK Helsinki (loan)	12	(3)
2021	→ Honka (loan)	8	(3)
2022–2023	Kataller Toyama	3	(0)
2023–2024	Livorno	17	(4)
2024	Albenga	5	(1)
2024–	Magenta	5	(0)

International career
2015–2016	Brazil U17	5	(1)
- * Club domestic league appearances and goals as of 17 November 2024

Luís Henrique Farinhas Taffner (born 17 March 1998), known as Luís Henrique, is a Brazilian footballer who plays as a forward for Italian Serie D club Magenta.

== Club career ==
Born in Vila Velha, Espírito Santo, Luís Henrique began his professional career at Botafogo de Futebol e Regatas. He made his debut on 3 July 2015, at the age of 17, starting in a Série B against Sampaio Corrêa at the Estádio Olímpico João Havelange, scoring two goals in the first half of a 5–0 victory which kept his team at the top of the table. Away to title rivals Bahia twenty-two days later, he opened a 1–1 draw.

After finishing the year with four goals in 15 appearances and a subsequent promotion, Luís Henrique featured regularly during the 2016 Campeonato Carioca, but only scored two goals. He made his Série A debut on 22 May of that year, coming on as a late substitute for Neílton in a 1–1 away draw against Sport.

On 3 January 2017, after being rarely used, Luís Henrique rescinded his contract – which was due to expire in May – and signed a two-year contract with Atlético Paranaense.

On 16 May 2019, Henrique joined Finnish club Helsinki IFK. On 15 January 2020 it was confirmed, that Helsinki's cooperation club, Vejle Boldklub from Denmark, had signed Henrique. The Brazilian, however, would stay at Helsinki for the 2020 season on loan. HIFK confirmed on 8 September 2020, that Vejle had recalled Henrique. However, he only played 82 minutes in the league and therefore, he was loaned out once again on 24 January 2021, this time to HJK Helsinki.

On 9 March 2022, Henrique joined Japanese J3 League club Kataller Toyama.

== International career ==
Luís Henrique was part of the Brazil squad at the 2015 FIFA U-17 World Cup in Chile. In the last 16, against New Zealand at the Estadio Sausalito in Viña del Mar, he won an added-time penalty when fouled by James McGarry, and converted it for the only goal of the game.

== Honours ==
Botafogo

- Campeonato Brasileiro Série B: 2015
