= 2020 Veikkausliiga =

Football season in Finland

Veikkausliiga
- Season: 2020
- Champions: HJK
- Relegated: RoPS, TPS
- Champions League: HJK
- Europa Conference League: KuPS; Inter Turku; FC Honka
- Matches: 132
- Goals: 296 (2.24 per match)
- Top goalscorer: Albion Ademi; Roope Riski (12 each)
- Biggest home win: HJK 6–1 IFK Mariehamn (30 August 2020)
- Biggest away win: FC Lahti 0–4 HJK (1 July 2020)
- Highest scoring: Ilves 4–3 IFK Mariehamn (1 July 2020); HJK 6–1 IFK Mariehamn (30 August 2020); HIFK 4–3 HJK (10 September 2020)
- Longest winning run: 7 matches KuPS
- Longest unbeaten run: 10 matches HJK
- Longest winless run: 16 matches RoPS
- Longest losing run: 12 matches RoPS

The 2020 Veikkausliiga was the 90th season of top-tier football in Finland with KuPS being the defending champions. HJK won the league.

== New league format ==
Veikkausliiga adopted a new league format for the 2019 season. Each team played against each other twice in the regular season. After the regular season the top six teams advanced to the Championship Series which determines the champion and European tournament qualification places. The bottom six teams advanced to the Challenger Series. The best team from the Challenger Series plays in a tournament against the Championship Series' 4th, 5th, and 6th place teams. The winner from that plays in a final series against the 3rd best team from the Championship Series. The last UEFA Europa Conference League qualification place goes to the winner of that final series.

The bottom team from the Challenger Series will relegate to the Ykkönen, and second to last team will play in a relegation play-off series against the 2nd best team from Ykkönen.

== Teams ==
VPS were relegated to Ykkönen after finishing at the bottom of the 2019 season. Their place was taken by Ykkönen champions FC Haka.

KPV as 11th-placed team lost their Veikkausliiga spot after losing to second-placed Ykkönen team TPS in a relegation/promotion playoff.

=== Stadiums and locations ===
Location of teams in 2020 Veikkausliiga

Club	Location	Stadium	Turf	Capacity
FC Haka	Valkeakoski	Tehtaan kenttä	Artificial	3,516
FC Honka	Espoo	Tapiolan Urheilupuisto	Natural	6,000
FC Inter	Turku	Veritas Stadion	Natural	9,372
FC Lahti	Lahti	Lahden Stadion	Natural	15,000
HIFK	Helsinki	Bolt Arena	Artificial	10,770
HJK	Helsinki	Bolt Arena	Artificial	10,770
IFK Mariehamn	Mariehamn	Wiklöf Holding Arena	Artificial	4,000
Ilves	Tampere	Tammelan Stadion	Natural	5,040
KuPS	Kuopio	Savon Sanomat Areena	Artificial	5,000
RoPS	Rovaniemi	Rovaniemen keskuskenttä	Artificial	4,000
SJK	Seinäjoki	OmaSP Stadion	Artificial	6,000
TPS	Turku	Veritas Stadion	Natural	9,372

== League table ==
On 28 October 2020, it was decided to cancel the championship and relegation round due to the COVID-19 pandemic in Finland, and the regular season standings after 22 rounds would be considered final.

Pos	Team	Pld	W	D	L	GF	GA	GD	Pts	Qualification or relegation
1	HJK (C)	22	14	6	2	53	17	+36	48	Qualification for the Champions League first qualifying round
2	Inter Turku	22	12	5	5	36	17	+19	41	Qualification for the Europa Conference League first qualifying round
3	KuPS	22	12	5	5	39	26	+13	41	Qualification for the Europa Conference League first qualifying round
4	FC Honka	22	9	10	3	26	17	+9	37	Qualification for the Europa Conference League first qualifying round
5	Ilves	22	10	6	6	37	29	+8	36	
6	FC Lahti	22	8	8	6	33	30	+3	32	
7	SJK	22	8	5	9	27	29	−2	29	
8	HIFK	22	8	4	10	29	33	−4	28	
9	IFK Mariehamn	22	6	5	11	29	43	−14	23	
10	FC Haka	22	5	7	10	25	41	−16	22	
11	TPS (R)	22	6	3	13	23	39	−16	21	Qualification for the relegation play-offs
12	RoPS (R)	22	1	2	19	15	51	−36	5	Relegation to the Ykkönen

Source: ,
Rules for classification: 1) Points; 2) Goal difference; 3) Goals scored; 4) Head-to-head points; 5) Head-to-head goal difference; 6) Head-to-head away goals scored; 7) Play-off
(Note: Play-off is only played if need to decide champion, teams for relegation or UEFA competition and will be played on a neutral ground).
(C) Champions; (R) Relegated

=== Results ===
Home \ Away	HAK	HON	INT	LAH	HFK	HJK	MAR	ILV	KPS	RPS	SJK	TPS
FC Haka	—	1–1	0–2	2–2	0–2	1–4	0–1	0–2	2–4	0–2	1–4	2–1
FC Honka	1–2	—	1–1	2–1	0–1	0–0	1–0	3–2	1–1	1–0	0–0	3–1
Inter Turku	2–0	0–0	—	3–0	3–2	1–0	2–1	5–1	2–0	3–1	0–1	3–0
FC Lahti	0–0	0–0	2–2	—	2–1	0–4	3–1	3–2	1–2	3–0	0–0	1–1
HIFK	0–1	1–1	0–0	0–3	—	4–3	2–2	1–2	0–3	1–0	2–1	2–0
HJK	3–1	1–1	1–1	1–1	3–0	—	6–1	2–0	2–2	4–0	2–0	2–2
IFK Mariehamn	2–2	0–0	2–0	2–2	0–3	0–5	—	0–2	0–2	4–0	2–3	1–0
Ilves	1–1	4–1	0–2	3–1	2–2	1–2	4–3	—	0–0	1–0	0–0	4–0
KuPS	2–3	0–2	1–0	3–0	3–2	0–3	2–1	1–1	—	3–0	2–1	3–1
RoPS	2–2	1–3	0–2	0–4	0–1	0–1	2–3	1–1	0–2	—	2–3	2–3
SJK	1–1	0–2	3–2	0–1	3–2	1–2	1–2	1–3	1–1	2–1	—	1–0
TPS	2–3	0–2	1–0	1–3	1–0	0–2	1–1	0–1	3–2	4–1	1–0	—

Legend: Blue = home team win; Yellow = draw; Red = away team win.

=== European competition ===
Five teams would originally play for a spot in the 2021–22 UEFA Europa Conference League first qualifying round, but this was cancelled and the spot would be awarded based on regular season position.

=== Relegation play-offs ===
11 November 2020
18:30 EET (UTC+2)

KTP	0–0	TPS

Arto Tolsa Areena, Kotka
Attendance: 1315
Referee: Mattias Gestranius
14 November 2020
16:00 EET (UTC+2)

TPS	1–1	KTP
Muzaci 58'		Mäkijärvi 83'

Veritas Stadion, Turku
Attendance: 2469
Referee: Dennis Antamo

1–1 on aggregate. KTP won on away goals.

== Season statistics ==
=== Top scorers ===
As of 4 November 2020

Rank	Player	Club	Goals
1	(Finland) Roope Riski	HJK	16
2	(Albania) Albion Ademi	IFK Mariehamn	14
3	(Finland) Timo Furuholm	Inter Turku	10
4	(Finland) Jasin-Amin Assehnoun	FC Lahti	9
4	(Finland) Tim Väyrynen	HJK	9
6	(Finland) Lauri Ala-Myllymäki	Ilves	7
6	(Cameroon) Jean Marie Dongou	FC Honka	7
6	(Finland) Naatan Skyttä	Ilves	7
6	(Nigeria) Aniekpeno Udo	KuPS	7
10	(France) Dimitry Imbongo	FC Lahti	6
10	(Finland) Ilmari Niskanen	KuPS	6
10	(Finland) Salomo Ojala	FC Haka	6

== Awards ==
=== Annual awards ===
Award	Winner	Club
Player of the Year	(Finland) Roope Riski	HJK
Goalkeeper of the Year	(United States) Tim Murray	Honka
Defender of the Year	(Finland) Daniel O'Shaughnessy	HJK
Midfielder of the Year	(Ghana) Nana Boateng	KuPS
Striker of the Year	(Finland) Roope Riski	HJK
Breakthrough of the Year	(Nigeria) Usman Sale	KuPS
Coach of the Year	(Finland) Samuel Fagerholm	KuPS

=== Team of the Year ===

Team of the Year
Goalkeeper	(United States) Tim Murray (Honka)			
Defence	(Finland) Nikolai Alho (HJK)	(Netherlands) Rick Ketting (Inter Turku)	(Finland) Daniel O'Shaughnessy (HJK)	(Colombia) Luis Carlos Murillo (HJK)
Midfield	(Finland) Riku Riski (HJK)	(Ghana) Nana Boateng (KuPS)	(Finland) Naatan Skyttä (Ilves)	(Albania) Albion Ademi (Mariehamn)
Attack	(Finland) Timo Furuholm (Inter Turku)		(Finland) Roope Riski (HJK)	
