= 2020 RoPS season =

RoPS
2020 season
- Chairman: Risto Niva
- Manager: Vesa Tauriainen until 15 September; Mikko Mannila from 16 September
- Stadium: Rovaniemen keskuskenttä
- Veikkausliiga: 12th
- Finnish Cup: Sixth Round
- Top goalscorer: League: Matias Tamminen (3); All: Matias Tamminen (3)
Home colours	Away colours

The 2020 season is RoPS's 7th Veikkausliiga season since their promotion back to the top flight in 2012.

== Season events ==
On 19 November 2019, RoPS announced the signing of Obed Malolo and Arinse Uade.

On 21 November 2019, Aleksandr Kokko signed a new contract for the 2020 season.

On 4 December 2019, Eetu Muinonen signed a new contract for the 2020 season.

On 10 December 2019, Wato Kuaté returned to RoPS, signing a two-year contract.

On 11 December 2019, Youness Rahimi signed a new contract for the 2020 season.

On 18 December 2019, RoPS announced the signing of Raymond Gyasi.

On 10 February, RoPS announced the signing of Martin Kompalla.

On 9 March, RoPS announced the signing of Zurab Tsiskaridze from Al-Jabalain.

On 10 March, RoPS announced the signing of Kalle Katz on loan from HJK, until the end of the season.

On 7 June, RoPS announced the signing of Enoch Banza on loan from HJK, until the end of the season.

On 9 June, RoPS announced the signing of Daniel Carr, who'd last played for Apollon Limassol.

On 15 June, RoPS announced the signing of Matias Niemelä on loan from HJK, until the end of the season.

On 26 June, Wato Kuaté was released by RoPS.

On 31 July, Joonas Vahtera joined on loan from HJK for the remainder of the season.

On 12 August, Martin Kompalla left RoPS by mutual consent, whilst Sammy Ndjock joined the club.

On 15 September, Vesa Tauriainen left his role as Head Coach, with Mikko Mannila being appointed as his replacement on 16 September.

== Squad ==
As of 12 August 2020

Note: Flags indicate national team as defined under FIFA eligibility rules; some limited exceptions apply. Players may hold more than one non-FIFA nationality.

No.	Pos.	Nation	Player
2	DF	FIN	Simo Majander
3	DF	FIN	Otto Kemppainen
5	DF	FIN	Kalle Katz (on loan from HJK)
6	DF	FIN	Atte Sihvonen
7	FW	FIN	Youness Rahimi
8	DF	FIN	Obed Malolo
11	FW	FIN	Aleksandr Kokko
12	GK	FIN	Mikko Rantala
14	MF	FIN	Eetu Muinonen
15	DF	FIN	Jussi Niska
17	FW	FIN	Sampo Ala
18	FW	FIN	Veka Pyyny
19	MF	FIN	Tuomas Kaukua

No.	Pos.	Nation	Player
20	DF	FIN	Juho Hyvärinen
21	FW	FIN	Matias Tamminen
22	MF	FIN	Rasmus Degerman
23	FW	FIN	Enoch Banza (on loan from HJK)
24	MF	FIN	Tommi Jäntti
25	FW	TTO	Daniel Carr
26	DF	FIN	Eerik Kantola
27	DF	NGR	Samuel Olabisi
28	FW	FIN	Jarkko Luiro
29	DF	FIN	Joonas Vahtera (on loan from HJK)
32	GK	FIN	Matias Niemelä (on loan from HJK)
33	GK	CMR	Sammy Ndjock
77	DF	GEO	Zurab Tsiskaridze

== Transfers ==
=== In ===
Date	Position	Nationality	Name	From	Fee	Ref.
19 November 2019†	DF	(England)	Arinse Uade		Free	
19 November 2019†	MF	(Finland)	Obed Malolo	SJK	Free	
10 December 2019†	MF	(Cameroon)	Wato Kuaté		Free	
18 December 2019†	FW	(Ghana)	Raymond Gyasi	Stabæk	Free	
10 February 2020	GK	(Poland)	Martin Kompalla	VPS	Free	
9 March 2020	DF	(Georgia (country))	Zurab Tsiskaridze	Al-Jabalain	Undisclosed	
9 June 2020	FW	(Trinidad and Tobago)	Daniel Carr	Apollon Limassol	Free	
12 August 2020	GK	(Cameroon)	Sammy Ndjock	Mikkelin Palloilijat	Undisclosed	

† Transfers announced on the above date, being finalised on 1 January 2020.

=== Loans in ===
Start date	Position	Nationality	Name	From	End date	Ref.
10 March 2020	DF	(Finland)	Kalle Katz	HJK	End of Season	
7 June 2020	FW	(Finland)	Enoch Banza	HJK	End of Season	
15 June 2020	GK	(Finland)	Matias Niemelä	HJK	End of Season	
31 July 2020	DF	(Finland)	Joonas Vahtera	HJK	End of Season	

=== Out ===
Date	Position	Nationality	Name	To	Fee	Ref.
28 October 2019†	GK	(Spain)	Antonio Reguero	HJK	Undisclosed	
28 October 2019†	MF	(Finland)	Lucas Lingman	HJK	Undisclosed	

† Transfers announced on the above date, being finalised on 1 January 2020.

=== Released ===
Date	Position	Nationality	Name	Joined	Date
26 June 2020	MF	(Cameroon)	Wato Kuaté		
30 June 2020	DF	(England)	Arinse Uade	Rampla Juniors	
24 July 2020	FW	(Ghana)	Raymond Gyasi		
12 August 2020	GK	(Poland)	Martin Kompalla		

== Friendlies ==
6 June 2020	RoPS	3 – 1	AC Kajaani	Rovaniemi
EEST (UTC+3)	Kuaté 70'; M.Tamminen 79'; J.Niska 82'	Report	Zeneli 54'

12 June 2020	AC Oulu	0 – 0	RoPS	Oulu
14:00 EEST (UTC+3)		Report		Stadium: Heinäpää

== Competitions ==
=== Veikkausliiga ===
==== Regular season ====
===== Results summary =====
Overall								Home						Away					
Pld	W	D	L	GF	GA	GD	Pts	W	D	L	GF	GA	GD	W	D	L	GF	GA	GD
22	1	2	19	15	51	−36	5	0	2	9	10	25	−15	1	0	10	5	26	−21

Last updated: 4 November 2020.
Source: See Results

===== Results by matchday =====
Round	1	2	3	4	5	6	7	8	9	10	11	12	13	14	15	16	17	18	19	20	21	22
Ground	A	H	H	H	A	H	A	H	A	H	H	A	A	A	H	H	A	A	H	A	A	H
Result	L	L	D	D	L	L	L	L	L	L	L	L	L	L	L	L	W	L	L	L	L	L

Updated to match(es) played on 4 November 2020. Source: See Results
A = Away; H = Home; W = Win; D = Draw; L = Loss

===== Results =====
2 July 2020 1	Inter Turku	3 – 1	RoPS	Turku
18:30 EEST (UTC+3)	Nurmi (yellow card) 5'; Mastokangas 27'; Muñiz (yellow card) 39'; Paananen 81'; Ketting 88'	Report	Sihvonen (yellow card) 18'; Kokko 67'; Kompalla (yellow card) 71'; Carr (yellow card) 85'	Stadium: Veritas Stadion; Referee: Mattias Gestranius

8 July 2020 2	RoPS	0 – 1	HIFK	Rovaniemi
18:30 EEST (UTC+3)	Kaukua (yellow card) 67'	Report	Bäckman (yellow card) 3'; Sharza (yellow card) 39'; Mattsson (yellow card) 39'; Tukiainen 68'; Auvinen (yellow card) 80'; Halme (yellow card) 90+1'	Stadium: Keskuskenttä; Referee: Mohammad Al Emara

17 July 2020 3	RoPS	2 – 2	Haka	Rovaniemi
18:30 EEST (UTC+3)	Kaukua 26' (yellow card) 58'; Tamminen 27'; Malolo (yellow card) 85'	Report	Markkanen 19'; Bushue (yellow card) 35'; N.Friberg 66'; H.Malundama (yellow card) 80'	Stadium: Keskuskenttä; Referee: Kalle Mäkinen

21 July 2020 4	RoPS	1 – 1	Ilves	Rovaniemi
18:30 EEST (UTC+3)	Malolo (yellow card) 33'; Degerman (yellow card) 78'; Tamminen (yellow card) 82' (goal) 88'; Pyyny (yellow card) 90+6'	Report	Mensah (yellow card) 43'; Skyttä 54' (yellow card) 70'; Mömmö (yellow card) 89'	Stadium: Keskuskenttä; Referee: Jari Jarvinen

26 July 2020 5	Honka	1 – 0	RoPS	Espoo
17:00 EEST (UTC+3)	Martín 17' (pen.); Arko-Mensah (yellow card) 63'; Rasimus (yellow card) 90+2'	Report	Tamminen (yellow card) 25'; Katz (yellow card) 59'	Stadium: Tapiolan Urheilupuisto; Referee: Joni Hyytia

1 August 2020 6	RoPS	2 – 3	TPS	Rovaniemi
17:00 EEST (UTC+3)	Katz (yellow card) 22'; Banza 40'; Hyvärinen 85'	Report	Pikkarainen 13'; Alhassan (yellow card) 48'; Olawale 67'; Peräaho 88'	Stadium: Keskuskenttä; Referee: Ville Nevalainen

5 August 2020 7	Ilves	1 – 0	RoPS	Tampere
18:30 EEST (UTC+3)	Ala-Myllymäki 50'; Skyttä (yellow card) 77'	Report		Stadium: Tammelan Stadion; Referee: Antti Munukka

9 August 2020 8	RoPS	2 – 3	IFK Mariehamn	Rovaniemi
17:00 EEST (UTC+3)	Tsiskaridze 23'; Vahtera 57' (pen.)	Report	Makrillos (yellow card) 15'; Ademi 40'; Pelvas 53'; Grönlund 90+3'; Buwalda (yellow card) 90+4'	Stadium: Keskuskenttä; Referee: Dennis Antamo

14 August 2020 9	Lahti	3 – 0	RoPS	Lahti
18:30 EEST (UTC+3)	Lahti 20'; Imbongo 49'; Jäntti (yellow card) 56'; Lampinen 89'	Report	Tamminen (yellow card) 66'; Katz (yellow card) 90+2'	Stadium: Lahti Stadium; Referee: Jani Laaksonen

18 August 2020 18	RoPS	0 – 2	Inter Turku	Rovaniemi
18:30 EEST (UTC+3)	Muinonen (yellow card) 47'; Sihvonen (yellow card) 54'; Katz (yellow card) 80'	Report	Marttinen (yellow card) 33'; Kouassivi-Benissan (yellow card) 38'; Ruane (yellow card) 42'; Källman 67'; Kagayama 90+1'	Stadium: Keskuskenttä; Referee: Antti Munukka
Note: Match originally scheduled for 2 October 2020.

22 August 2020 10	RoPS	0 – 1	HJK	Rovaniemi
17:00 EEST (UTC+3)	Majander (yellow card) 50'	Report	Ri.Riski (yellow card) 90'; Ro.Riski 90+3'	Stadium: Keskuskenttä; Referee: Joni Hyytia

26 August 2020 11	IFK Mariehamn	4 – 0	RoPS	Mariehamn
18:30 EEST (UTC+3)	Pelvas 19'; Ademi 38' (pen.), 71'; Buwalda (yellow card) 54'; Backaliden 60' (pen.); Järvenpää (yellow card) 62'; Okoye (yellow card) 86'	Report	Sihvonen (yellow card) 59'	Stadium: Wiklöf Holding Arena; Referee: Oliver Reitala

29 August 2020 12	SJK	2 – 1	RoPS	Seinäjoki
17:00 EEST (UTC+3)	Hetemaj 25' (yellow card) 50'; Sid (yellow card) 37'; Lepistö 59'; Ngueukam (yellow card) 90+3'	Report	Malolo (yellow card) 8'; Kaukua 75' (yellow card) 81'	Stadium: OmaSP Stadion; Referee: Mikko Juusola

9 September 2020 13	KuPS	3 – 0	RoPS	Kuopio
18:30 EEST (UTC+3)	Tomás (yellow card) 19'; Rangel 30'; Sale 33'; Adjei-Boateng (yellow card) 67'; Udo 85'	Report	Majander (yellow card) 38'	Stadium: Kuopio Football Stadium; Referee: Jari Jarvenin

12 September 2020 14	RoPS	1 – 3	Honka	Rovaniemi
17:00 EEST (UTC+3)	Vahtera 54'; Kokko (yellow card) 62'; Banza (yellow card) 66'	Report	Kandji 26'; Heikkilä 44'; Dongou 57'; Saarikivi (yellow card) 83'	Stadium: Keskuskenttä; Referee: Petri Viljanen

20 September 2020 15	RoPS	0 – 2	KuPS	Rovaniemi
18:30 EEST (UTC+3)	Kokko (yellow card) 24'; Vahtera (yellow card) 37'	Report	Nissinen (yellow card) 28'; Adjei-Boateng 33' (yellow card) 68'; Savolainen 40'	Stadium: Keskuskenttä; Referee: Kalle Makinen

23 September 2020 16	Haka	0 – 2	RoPS	Valkeakoski
17:00 EEST (UTC+3)	Popovitch (yellow card) 28'; Bushue (yellow card) 43'; Markkanen (yellow card) 80'	Report	Malolo (yellow card) 32'; Kokko (yellow card) 52'; Banza 59'; Rahimi 72' (pen.); Niska (yellow card) 86'; Niemelä (yellow card) 90+4'	Stadium: Tehtaan kenttä Referee: Mohammad Al-Emara

28 September 2020 17	HJK	4 – 0	RoPS	Helsinki
18:30 EEST (UTC+3)	Ro.Riski 14', 44'; Schüller 35'; Meriluoto 78'	Report		Stadium: Bolt Arena; Referee: Mohammad Al-Emara

7 October 2020 19	RoPS	0 – 4	Lahti	Rovaniemi
18:30 EEST (UTC+3)		Report	Imbongo 45' (pen.); Hambo (yellow card) 60'; Tsiskaridze 66' (o.g.); Zeqiri 84'; Auranen 90'	Stadium: Keskuskenttä; Referee: Jari Jarvinen

19 October 2020 20	TPS	4 – 1	RoPS	Turku
18:30 EEST (UTC+3)	Haarala 17', 45+2', 54' (pen.); Ääritalo 31'	Report	Tamminen 90'	Stadium: Veritas Stadion; Referee: Mohammad Al-Emara

22 October 2020 21	HIFK	1 – 0	RoPS	Helsinki
18:00 EEST (UTC+3)	Halme (yellow card) 22'; Manneh 48' (yellow card) 76'; Fagerström (yellow card) 82'	Report	Malolo (yellow card) 64'; Sihvonen (yellow card) 78'	Stadium: Bolt Arena; Referee: Toni Pohjoismaki

4 November 2020 22	RoPS	2 – 3	SJK	Rovaniemi
18:30 EEST (UTC+3)	Muinonen 64'; Vainionpää 90+2'	Report	Ledesma 54'; Ngueukam 74' (pen.); Jervis (yellow card) 85'; Hetemaj 90+3'	Stadium: Keskuskenttä; Referee: Mohammad Al-Emara

===== Table =====
Pos	Team	Pld	W	D	L	GF	GA	GD	Pts	Qualification or relegation
8	HIFK	22	8	4	10	29	33	−4	28	
9	IFK Mariehamn	22	6	5	11	29	43	−14	23	
10	FC Haka	22	5	7	10	25	41	−16	22	
11	TPS (R)	22	6	3	13	23	39	−16	21	Qualification for the relegation play-offs
12	RoPS (R)	22	1	2	19	15	51	−36	5	Relegation to the Ykkönen

Source: ,
Rules for classification: 1) Points; 2) Goal difference; 3) Goals scored; 4) Head-to-head points; 5) Head-to-head goal difference; 6) Head-to-head away goals scored; 7) Play-off
(Note: Play-off is only played if need to decide champion, teams for relegation or UEFA competition and will be played on a neutral ground).
(R) Relegated

=== Finnish Cup ===
==== Sixth Round ====
Team	Pld	W	D	L	GF	GA	GD	Pts
FC Ilves	5	3	2	0	10	4	+6	11
KuPS	5	3	2	0	8	2	+6	11
FC Haka	5	3	2	0	7	3	+4	11
FC Lahti	5	2	0	3	6	7	−1	6
SJK	5	0	1	4	4	11	−7	1
RoPS	5	0	1	4	3	11	−8	1

25 January 2020 1	RoPS	1 – 1	SJK	Oulu
14:00 EET (UTC+2)	Malolo (yellow card) 11'; Muinonen 60'	Report	Chávez 77'	Stadium: Heinäpään tekonurmi Attendance: 250; Referee: Dennis Antamo

1 February 2020 2	Ilves	3 – 1	RoPS	Tampere
14:30 EET (UTC+2)	Mömmö 14'; Fofana 45+1'; Tendeng (yellow card) 81' (goal) 87'	Report	Muinonen (yellow card) 33'; Kuaté (yellow card) 50'; Gyasi 65'	Stadium: Pirkkahalli C Attendance: 700; Referee: Oskari Hämäläinen

9 February 2020 3	RoPS	0 – 1	Haka	Oulu
16:00 EET (UTC+2)	Kuaté (yellow card) 59'	Report	A.Hilska 48'	Stadium: Heinäpään halli Attendance: 180; Referee: Antti Munukka

15 February 2020 4	Lahti	2 – 1	RoPS	Lahti
14:00 EET (UTC+2)	V.Isotalo (yellow card) 38'; Imbongo 49'; Eninful (yellow card) 62'; Assehnoun 84'	Report	Niska (yellow card) 26'; S.Olabisi 37'; Sihvonen (yellow card) 83'	Stadium: Mukkulan halli Attendance: 152; Referee: Ville Nevalainen

28 February 2020 5	KuPS	4 – 0	RoPS	Kuopio
18:30 EET (UTC+2)	Jyry 4'; Udo 24'; Adjei-Boateng 33', 79'; Haakenstad (yellow card) 44'	Report	S.Olabisi (yellow card) 41'	Stadium: Kuopiohalli; Attendance: 1,064; Referee: Ville Nevalainen

== Squad statistics ==
As of Match played 4 November 2020

=== Appearances and goals ===
No.	Pos	Nat	Player	Total		Veikkausliiga		Finnish Cup	
No.	Pos	Nat	Player	Apps	Goals	Apps	Goals	Apps	Goals
2	DF	(Finland) FIN	Simo Majander	14	0	7+4	0	3	0
5	DF	(Finland) FIN	Kalle Katz	17	0	17	0	0	0
6	DF	(Finland) FIN	Atte Sihvonen	22	0	17	0	5	0
7	FW	(Finland) FIN	Youness Rahimi	10	1	8+1	1	1	0
8	MF	(Finland) FIN	Obed Malolo	24	0	19	0	5	0
11	FW	(Finland) FIN	Aleksandr Kokko	10	1	6+1	1	3	0
12	GK	(Finland) FIN	Mikko Rantala	4	0	1	0	3	0
14	MF	(Finland) FIN	Eetu Muinonen	18	2	13	1	5	1
15	DF	(Finland) FIN	Jussi Niska	25	0	16+4	0	5	0
16	MF	(Finland) FIN	Kirill Bullat	1	0	0+1	0	0	0
17	FW	(Finland) FIN	Sampo Ala	17	0	3+10	0	1+3	0
18	FW	(Finland) FIN	Veka Pyyny	19	0	3+12	0	2+2	0
19	MF	(Finland) FIN	Tuomas Kaukua	18	2	13+5	2	0	0
20	DF	(Finland) FIN	Juho Hyvärinen	23	1	22	1	1	0
21	FW	(Finland) FIN	Matias Tamminen	25	3	13+8	3	1+3	0
22	MF	(Finland) FIN	Rasmus Degerman	24	0	3+17	0	1+3	0
23	FW	(Finland) FIN	Enoch Banza	16	2	12+4	2	0	0
24	MF	(Finland) FIN	Tommi Jäntti	10	0	3+3	0	3+1	0
25	FW	(Trinidad and Tobago) TTO	Daniel Carr	7	0	7	0	0	0
26	DF	(Finland) FIN	Eerik Kantola	7	0	5+2	0	0	0
27	DF	(Nigeria) NGR	Samuel Olabisi	12	1	3+5	0	4	1
28	FW	(Finland) FIN	Jarkko Luiro	2	0	0+2	0	0	0
29	DF	(Finland) FIN	Joonas Vahtera	13	2	13	2	0	0
32	GK	(Finland) FIN	Matias Niemelä	11	0	11	0	0	0
33	GK	(Cameroon) CMR	Sammy Ndjock	4	0	4	0	0	0
77	DF	(Georgia (country)) GEO	Zurab Tsiskaridze	15	1	14+1	1	0	0
Youth team players:
Players away from the club on loan:
Players who left RoPS during the season:
1	GK	(Poland) POL	Martin Kompalla	8	0	6	0	2	0
9	FW	(Ghana) GHA	Raymond Gyasi	8	1	3	0	5	1
10	MF	(Cameroon) CMR	Wato Kuaté	5	0	0	0	5	0

=== Goal scorers ===
Place	Position	Nation	Number	Name	Veikkausliiga	Finnish Cup	Total
1	FW	(Finland)	21	Matias Tamminen	3	0	3
2	MF	(Finland)	19	Tuomas Kaukua	2	0	2
2	DF	(Finland)	29	Joonas Vahtera	2	0	2
2	FW	(Finland)	23	Enoch Banza	2	0	2
2	MF	(Finland)	14	Eetu Muinonen	1	1	2
6	FW	(Finland)	11	Aleksandr Kokko	1	0	1
6	DF	(Finland)	20	Juho Hyvärinen	1	0	1
6	DF	(Georgia (country))	77	Zurab Tsiskaridze	1	0	1
6	FW	(Finland)	7	Youness Rahimi	1	0	1
6	FW	(Ghana)	9	Raymond Gyasi	0	1	1
6	DF	(Nigeria)	27	Samuel Olabisi	0	1	1
6				Own goal	1	0	1
TOTALS					15	3	18

=== Clean sheets ===
Place	Position	Nation	Number	Name	Veikkausliiga	Finnish Cup	Total
1	GK	(Finland)	32	Matias Niemelä	1	0	1
TOTALS					1	0	1

=== Disciplinary record ===
Number	Nation	Position	Name	Veikkausliiga		Finnish Cup		Total	
Number	Nation	Position	Name	Yellow card	Red card	Yellow card	Red card	Yellow card	Red card
2	(Finland)	DF	Simo Majander	2	0	0	0	2	0
5	(Finland)	DF	Kalle Katz	4	0	0	0	4	0
6	(Finland)	DF	Atte Sihvonen	4	0	1	0	5	0
8	(Finland)	MF	Obed Malolo	5	0	1	0	6	0
11	(Finland)	FW	Aleksandr Kokko	3	0	0	0	3	0
14	(Finland)	MF	Eetu Muinonen	1	0	1	0	2	0
15	(Finland)	DF	Jussi Niska	1	0	1	0	2	0
18	(Finland)	FW	Veka Pyyny	1	0	0	0	1	0
19	(Finland)	MF	Tuomas Kaukua	3	0	0	0	3	0
21	(Finland)	FW	Matias Tamminen	3	0	0	0	3	0
22	(Finland)	MF	Rasmus Degerman	1	0	0	0	1	0
23	(Finland)	FW	Enoch Banza	1	0	0	0	1	0
25	(Trinidad and Tobago)	FW	Daniel Carr	1	0	0	0	1	0
27	(Nigeria)	DF	Samuel Olabisi	0	0	1	0	1	0
29	(Finland)	DF	Joonas Vahtera	1	0	0	0	1	0
32	(Finland)	GK	Matias Niemelä	1	0	0	0	1	0
Players away on loan:
Players who left RoPS during the season:
1	(Poland)	GK	Martin Kompalla	1	0	0	0	1	0
10	(Cameroon)	MF	Wato Kuaté	0	0	2	0	2	0
TOTALS				32	0	7	0	39	0
