= 2020 HJK season =

HJK
2020 season
- Chairman: Olli-Pekka Lyytikäinen
- Manager: Toni Koskela
- Stadium: Bolt Arena
- Veikkausliiga: Champions
- Finnish Cup: Champions
- Top goalscorer: League: Roope Riski (16); All: Roope Riski (19)
- Highest home attendance: 569 vs TPS (25 January 2020)
- Lowest home attendance: 389 vs IFK Mariehamn (15 February 2020)
- Average home league attendance: 460 (15 February 2020)
Home colours	Away colours

The 2020 season is Helsingin Jalkapalloklubi's 112th competitive season.

== Season events ==
On 9 January, Harmeet Singh left HJK by mutual consent.

On 11 January, HJK announced the signing of Rasmus Schüller on a two-year contract.

On 29 January, HJK announced the signing of Jakob Tånnander on a one-year contract, with the option of another year, from Malmö, and Ivan Ostojić from Radnički Niš on a 1+1-year contract.

On 3 February, HJK announced the signing of Papua New Guinea international forward David Browne on a one-year contract, with the option of an additional two years.

On 3 March, HJK announced that Atomu Tanaka had returned to the club after two-years playing in Japan, signing on a contract until the end of July.

On 10 March, HJK announced that youngster Jimi Tauriainen would leave the club to join Chelsea in the summer.

On 13 March, the 2020 Veikkausliiga season was delayed until June, and HJK's Quarterfinal match against KPV was postponed due to the COVID-19 pandemic.

On 6 May, the Veikkausliiga announced that the 2020 season would begin on 1 July, running until 21 November.

On 15 May, Atomu Tanaka extended his contract with HJK until the end of the 2020 season.

On 26 May, Enoch Banza extended his contract with HJK until the end of the 2021 season, before joining RoPS on loan for the season on 7 June.

On 6 June, HJK announced the signing of Hugo Keto from Brighton & Hove Albion on a contract until the end of 2021, with the option for an additional year.

On 15 June, goalkeeper Matias Niemelä left the club to join RoPS on loan for the rest of the season.

On 18 June, HJK announce the singing of Pyry Hannola from Midtjylland.

On 2 July, HJK announced that Julius Tauriainen, who had been on loan at SC Freiburg U19, was now permanently moving to the German club.

On 3 July, Roni Peiponen announced his retirement from football, whilst HJK announced the signing of Ítalo to their second team, Klubi 04.

On 20 July, Kalle Katz's loan move to RoPS was confirmed having been held up by the COVID-19 pandemic in Finland.

On 25 July, Valtteri Moren returned to HJK on a contract until the end of the 2022 season.

On 21 August, Matti Peltola signed a new contract with HJK, keeping him at the club until 2022, with the option of an additional year.

On 27 August, HJK announced the signing of Markus Halsti on a contract until the end of the season, with the option of an additional year.

On 4 September, HJK announced the signing of Joose Mäkinen on a contract until the end of the 2022 season, with the option of an additional year.

== Squad ==
As of match played 4 November 2020

No.	Name	Nationality	Position	Date of birth (age)	Signed from	Signed in	Contract ends	Apps.	Goals
Goalkeepers
25	Antonio Reguero	(Spain)	GK	4 July 1982 (aged 38)	RoPS	2020	2020	22	0
31	Hugo Keto	(Finland)	GK	9 February 1998 (aged 22)	Brighton & Hove Albion	2020	2021(+1)	7	0
Defenders
3	Henri Toivomäki	(Finland)	DF	21 February 1991 (aged 29)	KuPS	2019		40	0
4	Markus Halsti	(Finland)	DF	19 March 1984 (aged 36)	Esbjerg fB	2020	2020 (+1)	7	1
5	Daniel O'Shaughnessy	(Finland)	DF	14 September 1994 (aged 26)	Cheltenham Town	2018	2021	83	8
6	Ivan Ostojić	(Serbia)	DF	26 June 1989 (aged 31)	Radnički Niš	2020	2020+1	18	0
13	Luis Carlos Murillo	(Colombia)	DF	16 October 1990 (aged 30)	KuPS	2020	2021	29	0
15	Miro Tenho	(Finland)	DF	2 April 1995 (aged 25)	Inter Turku	2020		22	1
16	Valtteri Moren	(Finland)	DF	15 June 1991 (aged 29)	Waasland-Beveren	2020	2022	122	8
17	Nikolai Alho	(Finland)	DF	12 March 1993 (aged 27)	Halmstads BK	2018		224	24
Midfields
8	Bubacar Djaló	(Portugal)	MF	2 February 1997 (aged 23)	Sporting CP B	2020	2020+2	22	0
9	Riku Riski	(Finland)	MF	16 August 1989 (aged 31)	Odd	2018	2021	93	27
10	Lucas Lingman	(Finland)	MF	25 January 1998 (aged 22)	RoPS	2020	2021+1	64	3
21	Santeri Väänänen	(Finland)	MF	1 January 2002 (aged 18)	Klubi 04	2018	2021	28	0
22	Ferhan Hasani	(North Macedonia)	MF	18 June 1990 (aged 30)	Al-Raed	2020		15	7
28	Rasmus Schüller	(Finland)	MF	18 June 1991 (aged 29)	Minnesota United	2020	2021	169	17
37	Atomu Tanaka	(Japan)	MF	4 October 1987 (aged 33)	Cerezo Osaka	2020	2020	126	32
54	Casper Terho	(Finland)	MF	24 June 2003 (aged 17)	Klubi 04	2020		3	0
67	Matti Peltola	(Finland)	MF	3 July 2002 (aged 18)	Klubi 04	2019	2022	5	1
88	Pyry Hannola	(Finland)	MF	21 October 2001 (aged 19)	Midtjylland	2020		6	0
Forwards
7	Eetu Vertainen	(Finland)	FW	11 May 1999 (aged 21)	Klubi 04	2017		76	13
11	Roope Riski	(Finland)	FW	16 August 1991 (aged 29)	SKN St. Pölten	2020	2021+1	29	19
19	Tim Väyrynen	(Finland)	FW	30 March 1993 (aged 27)	Roda JC Kerkrade	2019		45	16
24	David Browne	(Papua New Guinea)	FW	27 December 1995 (aged 24)	Auckland City	2020	2020+2	22	3
42	Kai Meriluoto	(Finland)	FW	2 January 2003 (aged 17)	Klubi 04	2020		3	1
51	Rico Finnäs	(Finland)	FW	14 October 2000 (aged 20)	Klubi 04	2020		1	0
	Samuel Anini Junior	(Finland)	FW	7 September 2002 (aged 18)	PK Keski-Uusimaa	2019	2020+1		
Klubi 04
	Joose Mäkinen	(Finland)	DF	11 February 2003 (aged 17)	Jazz	2020	2022 (+1)	0	0
	Ítalo	(Brazil)	DF	10 January 1996 (aged 24)		2020		0	0
Away on loan
12	Jakob Tånnander	(Sweden)	GK	10 August 2000 (aged 20)	Malmö	2020	2020+1	2	0
16	Kalle Katz	(Finland)	DF	4 January 2000 (aged 20)	Klubi 04	2018		4	0
20	Enoch Banza	(Finland)	FW	4 February 2000 (aged 20)	Klubi 04	2017	2021	18	1
27	Kevin Kouassivi-Benissan	(Finland)	MF	25 January 1999 (aged 21)	Klubi 04	2018	2021+1	17	0
30	Joonas Vahtera	(Finland)	MF	6 January 1996 (aged 24)	VPS	2019	2021+1	18	2
	Matias Niemelä	(Finland)	GK	15 March 2002 (aged 18)	Klubi 04	2020		0	0
Left during the season
18	Roni Peiponen	(Finland)	DF	9 April 1997 (aged 23)	Molde	2018	2021	68	2
61	Otto Ollikainen	(Finland)	MF	22 January 2001 (aged 19)	Klubi 04	2018		2	0
	Julius Tauriainen	(Finland)	MF	18 April 2001 (aged 19)	Klubi 04	2019		2	0
	Luka Hyryläinen	(Finland)	MF	24 August 2004 (aged 16)	Klubi 04	2019		0	0
	Jimi Tauriainen	(Finland)	FW	4 March 2004 (aged 16)	Klubi 04	2019		0	0

=== On loan ===
Note: Flags indicate national team as defined under FIFA eligibility rules; some limited exceptions apply. Players may hold more than one non-FIFA nationality.

No.	Pos.	Nation	Player
—	GK	FIN	Matias Niemelä (at RoPS until the end of the 2020 season)
—	GK	SWE	Jakob Tånnander (at Haka until the end of the 2020 season)
—	FW	FIN	Kalle Katz (at RoPS until the end of the 2020 season)

No.	Pos.	Nation	Player
—	MF	FIN	Kevin Kouassivi-Benissan (at Inter Turku until the end of the 2020 season)
—	MF	FIN	Joonas Vahtera (at RoPS until the end of the 2020 season)
—	FW	FIN	Enoch Banza (at RoPS until the end of the 2020 season)

=== Left the club during the season ===
Note: Flags indicate national team as defined under FIFA eligibility rules; some limited exceptions apply. Players may hold more than one non-FIFA nationality.

No.	Pos.	Nation	Player
18	DF	FIN	Roni Peiponen (Retired)
61	DF	FIN	Otto Ollikainen (to Honka)

No.	Pos.	Nation	Player
—	MF	FIN	Julius Tauriainen (to SC Freiburg U19)
—	FW	FIN	Jimi Tauriainen (to Chelsea)

== Transfers ==
=== In ===
Date	Position	Nationality	Name	From	Fee	Ref.
28 October 2019†	GK	(Spain)	Antonio Reguero	RoPS	Undisclosed	
28 October 2019†	MF	(Finland)	Lucas Lingman	RoPS	Undisclosed	
29 October 2019†	DF	(Colombia)	Luis Carlos Murillo	KuPS	Undisclosed	
4 November 2019†	DF	(Finland)	Miro Tenho	Inter Turku	Undisclosed	
21 November 2019†	FW	(Finland)	Roope Riski	St. Pölten	Undisclosed	
16 December 2019†	MF	(Portugal)	Bubacar Djaló	Sporting CP B	Undisclosed	
11 January 2020	MF	(Finland)	Rasmus Schüller	Minnesota United	Undisclosed	
29 January 2020	GK	(Sweden)	Jakob Tånnander	Malmö	Undisclosed	
29 January 2020	DF	(Serbia)	Ivan Ostojić	Radnički Niš	Undisclosed	
3 February 2020	FW	(Papua New Guinea)	David Browne	Auckland City	Undisclosed	
3 March 2020	MF	(Japan)	Atomu Tanaka	Cerezo Osaka	Free	
6 June 2020††	GK	(Finland)	Hugo Keto	Brighton & Hove Albion	Free	
18 June 2020	MF	(Finland)	Pyry Hannola	Midtjylland	Undisclosed	
3 July 2020	DF	(Brazil)	Ítalo		Free	
25 July 2020	DF	(Finland)	Valtteri Moren	Waasland-Beveren	Undisclosed	
27 August 2020	DF	(Finland)	Markus Halsti	Esbjerg fB	Free	
4 September 2020	DF	(Finland)	Joose Mäkinen	Jazz	Undisclosed	

† Transfers announced on the above date, being finalised on 1 January 2020.
†† Transfers announced on the above date, being finalised on 1 July 2020.

=== Out ===
Date	Position	Nationality	Name	To	Fee	Ref.
24 January 2020	MF	(Finland)	Otto Ollikainen	Honka	Undisclosed	
10 March 2020	FW	(Finland)	Jimi Tauriainen	Chelsea	Undisclosed	
2 July 2020	MF	(Finland)	Julius Tauriainen	SC Freiburg U19	Undisclosed	
25 August 2020	MF	(Finland)	Luka Hyryläinen	Eintracht Frankfurt	Undisclosed	

† Transfer announced on the above date, being finalised on 1 July 2020.

=== Loans out ===
Start date	Position	Nationality	Name	To	End date	Ref.
28 November 2019	MF	(Finland)	Kevin Kouassivi-Benissan	Inter Turku	End of Season	
7 June 2020	FW	(Finland)	Enoch Banza	RoPS	End of Season	
15 June 2020	GK	(Finland)	Matias Niemelä	RoPS	End of Season	
20 July 2020	DF	(Finland)	Kalle Katz	RoPS	End of Season	
31 July 2020	MF	(Finland)	Joonas Vahtera	RoPS	End of Season	
10 August 2020	GK	(Sweden)	Jakob Tånnander	Haka	End of Season	

=== Released ===
Date	Position	Nationality	Name	Joined	Date	Ref.
9 January 2020	MF	(Norway)	Harmeet Singh	Sandefjord	18 September 2020	
3 July 2020	DF	(Finland)	Roni Peiponen	Retired		
31 December 2020	GK	(Spain)	Antonio Reguero	Lahti		
31 December 2020	DF	(Brazil)	Ítalo			
31 December 2020	DF	(Finland)	Kalle Katz	Ilves		
31 December 2020	DF	(Finland)	Henri Toivomäki	KuPS		
31 December 2020	DF	(Serbia)	Ivan Ostojić	Javor Ivanjica		
31 December 2020	DF	(Finland)	Nikolai Alho	MTK Budapest		
31 December 2020	MF	(North Macedonia)	Ferhan Hasani	Partizani Tirana		
31 December 2020	MF	(Finland)	Rasmus Schüller	Djurgården		
31 December 2020	MF	(Finland)	Joonas Vahtera	VPS		
31 December 2020	FW	(Finland)	Tim Väyrynen	Tirana		

=== Trial ===
Date From	Position	Nationality	Name	Last club	Date To	Ref.
January 2020	FW	(Papua New Guinea)	David Browne	Auckland City	3 February 2020	

== Friendlies ==
18 January 2020	HJK (Finland)	2 – 1	(Latvia) RFS	Helsinki
13:00 EET (UTC+2)	Väyrynen 52', 89'	Report	B.Bimenyimana 59'	Stadium: Talin Football Hall

6 March 2020	Brann (Norway)	1 – 1	(Finland) HJK	Bergen
13:00 EET (UTC+2)	Barmen 9'	Report	Ro.Riski 88'

6 June 2020	HJK	4 – 0	Gnistan	Helsinki
11:30 EEST (UTC+3)	K.Meriluoto 21'; Ri.Riski 30'; Väyrynen 56'; Hasani 67'	Report		Stadium: Bolt Arena

10 June 2020	HJK	2 – 1	Honka	Helsinki
19:00 EEST (UTC+3)	Hasani 57'; Väyrynen 71'	Report	E.Arko-Mensah 90+1'	Stadium: Bolt Arena

== Competitions ==
=== Veikkausliiga ===
==== Results summary ====
Overall								Home						Away					
Pld	W	D	L	GF	GA	GD	Pts	W	D	L	GF	GA	GD	W	D	L	GF	GA	GD
22	14	6	2	53	17	+36	48	6	5	0	27	9	+18	8	1	2	26	8	+18

Last updated: 4 November 2020.
Source: See Results

==== Results by matchday ====
Round	1	2	3	4	5	6	7	8	9	10	11	12	13	14	15	16	17	18	19	20	21	22
Ground	A	H	A	A	H	H	H	A	H	A	A	H	H	A	A	A	H	H	A	H	A	H
Result	W	W	L	W	W	D	D	W	D	W	W	W	W	L	W	D	D	W	W	W	W	D

Updated to match(es) played on 4 November 2020. Source: See Results
A = Away; H = Home; W = Win; D = Draw; L = Loss

==== Results ====
1 July 2020 1	Lahti	0 – 4	HJK	Lahti
18:30 EEST (UTC+3)	Coubronne (yellow card) 22'; Rashica (yellow card) 39'; Kuningas (yellow card) 57'	Report	Murillo (yellow card) 3'; Schüller 34'; Lingman 36'; Jäntti 64' (o.g.); Ro.Riski 78'	Stadium: Lahti Stadium; Referee: Mohammad Al Emara

8 July 2020 2	HJK	3 – 1	Haka	Helsinki
18:30 EEST (UTC+3)	Ro.Riski 10'; Schüller 54' (pen.); Lingman 81'	Report	Keita 56' (yellow card) 60' (yellow-red card) 60'; Bushue (yellow card) 68'	Stadium: Bolt Arena; Referee: Jari Jarvinen

17 July 2020 3	Inter Turku	1 – 0	HJK	Turku
18:30 EEST (UTC+3)	Muñiz (yellow card) 36'; Furuholm 83'	Report	Djaló (yellow card) 67'; Vertainen (yellow card) 80'	Stadium: Veritas Stadion; Referee: Oskari Hamalainen

22 July 2020 4	TPS	0 – 2	HJK	Turku
18:30 EEST (UTC+3)	Pyyhtiä (yellow card) 38'; Muzaci (yellow card) 55' (yellow-red card) 58'; Pikkarainen (yellow card) 57'	Report	Ostojić (yellow card) 4'; Väyrynen 9'; Ro.Riski 76'; Djaló (yellow card) 87'	Stadium: Veritas Stadion; Referee: Ville Nevalainen

25 July 2020 5	HJK	2 – 0	Ilves	Helsinki
17:00 EEST (UTC+3)	Väyrynen 25'; Ro.Riski (yellow card) 34'; Reguero (yellow card) 69'; Murillo (yellow card) 86'; Hasani 87'	Report	Fofana (yellow card) 80'	Stadium: Bolt Arena; Referee: Dennis Antamo

1 August 2020 6	HJK	2 – 2	KuPS	Helsinki
17:00 EEST (UTC+3)	Alho (yellow card) 64'; Ro.Riski 74'; Väyrynen 81'	Report	Niskanen 10', 79'; Pennanen (yellow card) 36'; T.Manga (yellow card) 39'; Tomás (yellow card) 73'	Stadium: Bolt Arena; Referee: Joni Hyytia

6 August 2020 7	HJK	1 – 1	Lahti	Helsinki
18:30 EEST (UTC+3)	Vertainen 8'; Djaló (yellow card) 86'	Report	Eninful (yellow card) 7'; Zeqiri (yellow card) 44'; Coubronne (yellow card) 77'; Imbongo 84'; Lahti (yellow card) 90'	Stadium: Bolt Arena; Referee: Jari Jarvenin

9 August 2020 8	KuPS	0 – 3	HJK	Kuopio
18:30 EEST (UTC+3)	Adjei-Boateng (yellow card) 13'	Report	Vertainen 7'; Hasani (yellow card) 10'; Ro.Riski 53'; Ri.Riski 56'	Stadium: Kuopio Football Stadium; Referee: Antti Munukka

15 August 2020 9	HJK	1 – 1	Honka	Helsinki
17:00 EEST (UTC+3)	Tenho (yellow card) 25' (goal) 56'; Murillo (yellow card) 40'; Lingman (yellow card) 65'; Ostojić (yellow card) 90+1'	Report	Dongou 19'; Savage (yellow card) 69'	Stadium: Bolt Arena; Referee: Mohammad Al Emara

18 August 2020 18	Haka	1 – 4	HJK	Valkeakoski
18:30 EEST (UTC+3)	Kyöstilä (yellow card) 59'; Moren 61' (o.g.); S.Saarinen (yellow card) 88'	Report	Browne 50'; Hasani 59' (pen.), 65', 67' (pen.); Lingman (yellow card) 72'	Stadium: Tehtaan kenttä Referee: Dennis Antamo
Note: Match originally scheduled for 2 October 2020.

22 August 2020 10	RoPS	0 – 1	HJK	Rovaniemi
17:00 EEST (UTC+3)	S.Majander (yellow card) 50'	Report	Ri.Riski (yellow card) 90'; Ro.Riski 90+3'	Stadium: Keskuskenttä; Referee: Joni Hyytia

26 August 2020 11	HJK	2 – 0	SJK	Helsinki
18:30 EEST (UTC+3)	Ro.Riski 13'; Browne 75'; Hannola (yellow card) 81'	Report	Atakayi (yellow card) 49'; Boxall (yellow card) 62'	Stadium: Bolt Arena; Referee: Jari Jarvinen

30 August 2020 12	HJK	6 – 1	IFK Mariehamn	Helsinki
18:30 EEST (UTC+3)	Ri.Riski 8', 73'; Djaló (yellow card) 9'; Tanaka 11' (yellow card) 77'; Alho (yellow card) 14'; Ro.Riski 29', 41'; Okoye 69' (o.g.)	Report	Ademi 10'; Pelvas (yellow card) 60'; Backaliden (yellow card) 90+1'	Stadium: Bolt Arena; Referee: Jani Laaksonen

10 September 2020 13	HIFK	4 – 3	HJK	Helsinki
18:30 EEST (UTC+3)	Tukiainen 13'; Mattsson 18'; Yaghoubi 29' (pen.); Mattila (yellow card) 79'; Auvinen 89' (yellow card) 90+2'	Report	Tanaka 24'; Ro.Riski 53'; Väyrynen 80' (pen.); Alho (yellow card) 87'; Lingman (yellow card) 88'	Stadium: Bolt Arena; Referee: Mattias Gestranius

13 September 2020 14	Ilves	1 – 2	HJK	Tampere
18:30 EEST (UTC+3)	D.Arifi (yellow card) 29'; Fofana (yellow card) 41'; Veteli 77' (red card) 89'	Report	Tanaka 19'; O'Shaughnessy (yellow card) 55'; Djaló (yellow card) 57'; Väyrynen 63'	Stadium: Tammelan Stadion; Referee: Oskari Hamalainen

19 September 2020 15	Honka	0 – 0	HJK	Espoo
18:30 EEST (UTC+3)	Kaufmann (yellow card) 45'; Kandji (yellow card) 86'	Report	O'Shaughnessy (yellow card) 89'	Stadium: Tapiolan Urheilupuisto; Referee: Antti Munukka

24 September 2020 16	HJK	2 – 2	TPS	Helsinki
18:30 EEST (UTC+3)	Lingman (yellow card) 21'; Väyrynen (yellow card) 24' (goal) 65'; Schüller (yellow card) 44'; Ri.Riski 56'; Moren (yellow card) 63'	Report	Jean (yellow card) 68'; Ääritalo 87'; Holma 90+2'	Stadium: Bolt Arena; Referee: Oskari Hamalainen

28 September 2020 17	HJK	4 – 0	RoPS	Helsinki
18:30 EEST (UTC+3)	Ro.Riski 14', 44'; Schüller 35'; Meriluoto 78'	Report		Stadium: Bolt Arena; Referee: Mohammad Al Emara

15 October 2020 19	SJK	1 – 2	HJK	Seinäjoki
18:30 EEST (UTC+3)	Hetemaj (yellow card) 15'; Ledesma 32' (yellow card) 54'	Report	Ro.Riski 18'; Tanaka 70'; Ri.Riski (yellow card) 90+1'	Stadium: OmaSP Stadion; Referee: Kalle Makinen

18 October 2020 20	HJK	3 – 0	HIFK	Helsinki
16:00 EEST (UTC+3)	Väyrynen 73'; Hasani 79' (pen.) (yellow card) 87'; Ro.Riski 85'	Report	Vitinho (yellow card) 62'; Yaghoubi (yellow card) 68'} Bäckman (yellow card) 79'	Stadium: Bolt Arena; Referee: Antti Munukka

1 November 2020 21	IFK Mariehamn	0 – 5	HJK	Mariehamn
17:30 EET (UTC+2)	Bilonoh (yellow card) 42'; Mäenpää (yellow card) 67'	Report	Halsti 10' (yellow card) 69'; Ro.Riski 20', 38'; Vertainen 55'; Hannola (yellow card) 79'; Väyrynen 85'	Stadium: Wiklöf Holding Arena; Referee: Antti Munukka

4 November 2020 22	HJK	1 – 1	Inter Turku	Helsinki
18:30 EET (UTC+2)	Tanaka 76' (yellow card) 82'; Alho (yellow card) 86'	Report	Ketting (yellow card) 12'; Ruane (yellow card) 28'; Paananen 46'; Hämäläinen (yellow card) 48'; Hoskonen (yellow card) 78'; Furuholm (yellow card) 85'	Stadium: Bolt Arena; Referee: Antti Munukka

==== Table ====
Pos	Team	Pld	W	D	L	GF	GA	GD	Pts	Qualification or relegation
1	HJK (C)	22	14	6	2	53	17	+36	48	Qualification for the Champions League first qualifying round
2	Inter Turku	22	12	5	5	36	17	+19	41	Qualification for the Europa Conference League first qualifying round
3	KuPS	22	12	5	5	39	26	+13	41	Qualification for the Europa Conference League first qualifying round
4	FC Honka	22	9	10	3	26	17	+9	37	Qualification for the Europa Conference League first qualifying round
5	Ilves	22	10	6	6	37	29	+8	36	

Source: ,
Rules for classification: 1) Points; 2) Goal difference; 3) Goals scored; 4) Head-to-head points; 5) Head-to-head goal difference; 6) Head-to-head away goals scored; 7) Play-off
(Note: Play-off is only played if need to decide champion, teams for relegation or UEFA competition and will be played on a neutral ground).
(C) Champions

=== Finnish Cup ===
==== Sixth Round ====
Team	Pld	W	D	L	GF	GA	GD	Pts
HJK	5	4	1	0	10	3	+7	13
Inter Turku	5	3	1	1	6	2	+4	10
Honka	5	1	3	1	4	4	0	6
TPS Turku	5	1	2	2	2	5	−3	5
HIFK	5	0	3	2	5	7	−2	3
IFK Mariehamn	5	0	2	3	5	11	−6	2

25 January 2020 1	HJK	3 – 0	TPS	Helsinki
13:30 EET (UTC+2)	Ri.Riski 7'; Peltola 42'; Browne 50'	Report	T.Hradecký (yellow card) 58'	Stadium: Bolt Arena; Attendance: 569; Referee: Oskari Hämäläinen

1 February 2020 2	HIFK	1 – 2	HJK	Helsinki
13:30 EET (UTC+2)	Bäckman (yellow card) 41' (yellow-red card) 78'; Luís Henrique (yellow card) 54'; Halme (yellow card) 60'; Tiquinho 85' (pen.)	Report	Schüller 12'; Ri.Riski (yellow card) 28' (goal) 34'; Djaló (yellow card) 48'; Reguero (yellow card) 85'; Väyrynen (yellow card) 89'	Stadium: Tali halli tekonurmi Attendance: 700; Referee: Mohammad Al Emara

8 February 2020 3	HJK	1 – 0	Inter Turku	Helsinki
13:30 EET (UTC+2)	Ro.Riski (yellow card) 36' (goal) 63'; Ri.Riski (yellow card) 68'	Report	Annan (yellow card) 22'; Muñiz (yellow card) 25'; Furuholm (yellow card) 90+4'	Stadium: Bolt Arena; Attendance: 423; Referee: Ville Nevalainen

15 February 2020 4	HJK	3 – 1	IFK Mariehamn	Helsinki
13:30 EET (UTC+2)	Vertainen 13'; Väyrynen 32' (pen.); Alho (yellow card) 45'; Hasani (yellow card) 65' (goal) 90'; Tenho (yellow card) 88'	Report	G.Backaliden (yellow card) 61' (goal) 87'	Stadium: Bolt Arena; Attendance: 389; Referee: Mikko Leino

27 February 2020 5	Honka	1 – 1	HJK	Espoo
15:00 EET (UTC+2)	Hatakka (yellow card) 37'; Ivanov (yellow card) 45+4'; Kaufmann 51' (pen.)	Report	Vertainen (yellow card) 45+4'; Hasani 54'; O'Shaughnessy (yellow card) 63'; Schüller (yellow card) 86'	Stadium: Esport Ratiopharm Arena; Attendance: 250; Referee: Oskari Hämäläinen

==== Knockout stage ====
16 June 2020 Last 16	KPV	0 – 2	HJK	Kokkola
18:00 EEST (UTC+3)		Report	Väyrynen 40'; O'Shaughnessy 76'	Stadium: Kokkolan Keskuskenttä; Attendance: 470; Referee: Petri Viljanen
Note: Match originally scheduled for 14 March, but postponed on 13 March due to the COVID-19 pandemic.

23 June 2020 Quarterfinal	TPS	0 – 1	HJK	Turku
20:00 EEST (UTC+3)	A.Muzaci (yellow card) 15'; Pikkarainen (yellow card) 78'; J.Siirtola (yellow card) 82'	Report	Väänänen (yellow card) 13'; O'Shaughnessy 65'	Stadium: Veritas Stadion; Referee: Mattias Gestranius

27 June 2020 Semifinal	Haka	2 – 3	HJK	Valkeakoski
16:00 EEST (UTC+3)	J.Kyöstilä 23'; Medo (yellow card) 55'; Markkanen 78'	Report	Väyrynen 19', 32'; Ri.Riski 62'	Stadium: Tehtaan kenttä

==== Final ====
3 October 2020	Inter Turku	0 – 2	HJK	Turku
14:00 EEST (UTC+3)	Haukioja (yellow card) 56'; Hoskonen (yellow card) 59'; Annan (yellow card) 83'	Report	Ro.Riski 3', 54'; Djaló (yellow card) 38'; Schüller (yellow card) 45+2'; Ri.Riski (yellow card) 76'	Stadium: Veritas Stadion, Turku

== Squad statistics ==
As of Match played 4 November 2020

=== Appearances and goals ===
No.	Pos	Nat	Player	Total		Veikkausliiga		Finnish Cup	
No.	Pos	Nat	Player	Apps	Goals	Apps	Goals	Apps	Goals
3	DF	(Finland) FIN	Henri Toivomäki	13	0	5+6	0	1+1	0
4	DF	(Finland) FIN	Markus Halsti	7	1	4+2	1	0+1	0
5	DF	(Finland) FIN	Daniel O'Shaughnessy	28	2	16+5	0	6+1	2
6	DF	(Serbia) SRB	Ivan Ostojić	18	0	7+6	0	3+2	0
7	FW	(Finland) FIN	Eetu Vertainen	17	3	4+8	2	2+3	1
8	MF	(Portugal) POR	Bubacar Djaló	22	0	12+5	0	4+1	0
9	MF	(Finland) FIN	Riku Riski	30	7	19+2	4	8+1	3
10	MF	(Finland) FIN	Lucas Lingman	29	2	18+2	2	9	0
11	FW	(Finland) FIN	Roope Riski	29	19	17+3	16	5+4	3
13	DF	(Colombia) COL	Luis Carlos Murillo	29	0	19+1	0	7+2	0
15	DF	(Finland) FIN	Miro Tenho	23	1	15	1	7+1	0
16	DF	(Finland) FIN	Valtteri Moren	11	0	9+1	0	1	0
17	DF	(Finland) FIN	Nikolai Alho	29	0	18+3	0	8	0
19	FW	(Finland) FIN	Tim Väyrynen	29	13	11+10	9	4+4	4
21	MF	(Finland) FIN	Santeri Väänänen	10	0	3+5	0	1+1	0
22	MF	(North Macedonia) MKD	Ferhan Hasani	15	7	7+2	5	3+3	2
24	FW	(Papua New Guinea) PNG	David Browne	22	3	7+7	2	4+4	1
25	GK	(Spain) ESP	Antonio Reguero	22	0	15	0	7	0
28	MF	(Finland) FIN	Rasmus Schüller	26	4	15+2	3	8+1	1
31	GK	(Finland) FIN	Hugo Keto	7	0	7	0	0	0
37	MF	(Japan) JPN	Atomu Tanaka	23	5	14+5	5	4	0
42	FW	(Finland) FIN	Kai Meriluoto	3	1	0+3	1	0	0
51	FW	(Finland) FIN	Rico Finnäs	1	0	0+1	0	0	0
54	MF	(Finland) FIN	Casper Terho	3	0	0+3	0	0	0
67	MF	(Finland) FIN	Matti Peltola	4	1	0	0	2+2	1
88	MF	(Finland) FIN	Pyry Hannola	6	0	1+5	0	0	0
Players from Klubi-04 who appeared:
Players away from the club on loan:
12	GK	(Sweden) SWE	Jakob Tånnander	2	0	0	0	2	0
16	DF	(Finland) FIN	Kalle Katz	3	0	0	0	2+1	0
20	FW	(Finland) FIN	Enoch Banza	3	0	0	0	1+2	0
30	MF	(Finland) FIN	Joonas Vahtera	6	0	0+3	0	0+3	0
Players who left HJK during the season:
18	DF	(Finland) FIN	Roni Peiponen	1	0	0	0	1	0

=== Goal scorers ===
Place	Position	Nation	Number	Name	Veikkausliiga	Finnish Cup	Total
1	FW	(Finland)	11	Roope Riski	16	3	19
2	FW	(Finland)	19	Tim Väyrynen	9	4	13
3	MF	(North Macedonia)	22	Ferhan Hasani	5	2	7
3	FW	(Finland)	9	Riku Riski	4	3	7
5	MF	(Japan)	37	Atomu Tanaka	5	0	5
6	MF	(Finland)	28	Rasmus Schüller	3	1	4
7	FW	(Papua New Guinea)	24	David Browne	2	1	3
7	FW	(Finland)	7	Eetu Vertainen	2	1	3
9	MF	(Finland)	10	Lucas Lingman	2	0	2
9	DF	(Finland)	5	Daniel O'Shaughnessy	0	2	2
9				Own goal	2	0	2
12	DF	(Finland)	15	Miro Tenho	1	0	1
12	FW	(Finland)	42	Kai Meriluoto	1	0	1
12	DF	(Finland)	4	Markus Halsti	1	0	1
12	MF	(Finland)	67	Matti Peltola	0	1	1
TOTALS					53	18	70

=== Clean sheets ===
Place	Position	Nation	Number	Name	Veikkausliiga	Finnish Cup	Total
1	GK	(Spain)	25	Antonio Reguero	8	5	13
2	GK	(Finland)	31	Hugo Keto	2	0	2
TOTALS					10	5	15

=== Disciplinary record ===
Number	Nation	Position	Name	Veikkausliiga		Finnish Cup		Total	
Number	Nation	Position	Name	Yellow card	Red card	Yellow card	Red card	Yellow card	Red card
4	(Finland)	DF	Markus Halsti	1	0	0	0	1	0
5	(Finland)	DF	Daniel O'Shaughnessy	2	0	1	0	3	0
6	(Serbia)	DF	Ivan Ostojić	2	0	0	0	2	0
7	(Finland)	FW	Eetu Vertainen	1	0	1	0	2	0
8	(Portugal)	MF	Bubacar Djaló	5	0	2	0	7	0
9	(Finland)	MF	Riku Riski	2	0	3	0	5	0
10	(Finland)	MF	Lucas Lingman	4	0	0	0	4	0
11	(Finland)	FW	Roope Riski	1	0	1	0	2	0
13	(Colombia)	DF	Luis Carlos Murillo	3	0	0	0	3	0
15	(Finland)	DF	Miro Tenho	1	0	1	0	2	0
16	(Finland)	DF	Valtteri Moren	1	0	0	0	1	0
17	(Finland)	DF	Nikolai Alho	4	0	1	0	5	0
19	(Finland)	FW	Tim Väyrynen	1	0	1	0	2	0
21	(Finland)	MF	Santeri Väänänen	0	0	1	0	1	0
22	(North Macedonia)	MF	Ferhan Hasani	2	0	1	0	3	0
25	(Spain)	GK	Antonio Reguero	1	0	1	0	2	0
28	(Finland)	MF	Rasmus Schüller	1	0	2	0	3	0
37	(Japan)	MF	Atomu Tanaka	2	0	0	0	2	0
88	(Finland)	MF	Pyry Hannola	2	0	0	0	2	0
Players away on loan:
Players who left HJK during the season:
TOTALS				36	0	16	0	52	0
