= Degerman =

Degerman is a surname. Notable people with the surname include:

- Rasmus Degerman (born 2001), Finnish footballer
- Tommi Degerman (born 1976), Finnish ice hockey player
