= Alexander Nilsson =

Alexander Nilsson may refer to:

- Alexander Nilsson (footballer, born 1990), Swedish footballer
- Alexander Nilsson (footballer, born 1992), Swedish footballer
- Alexander Nilsson (footballer, born 1997), Swedish footballer
