= Marttinen =

Marttinen is a Finnish surname. Notable people with the surname include:

- Aati Marttinen (born 1997), Finnish footballer
- Alpo K. Marttinen (1908–1975), Finnish colonel
- Erkki Marttinen (1926–2004), Finnish swimmer
- Jyri Marttinen (born 1982), Finnish ice hockey player
- Matias Marttinen (born 1990), Finnish politician
- Tauno Marttinen (1912–2008), Finnish composer
