= Aris Vaporakis =

Danish footballer (born 1995)

Personal information
- Full name: Aris Nikolaos Helling Vaporakis
- Date of birth: 6 January 1995 (age 31)
- Place of birth: Copenhagen, Denmark
- Height: 1.84 m (6 ft 0 in)
- Position: Goalkeeper

Team information
- Current team: Rosengård (on loan from B.93)
- Number: 44

Youth career
- B 1903
- Copenhagen

Senior career*
Years	Team	Apps	(Gls)
2014–2015	AB	0	(0)
2015–2018	Helsingør	19	(0)
2018	→ Víkingur (loan)	2	(0)
2019	AB	3	(0)
2019–2020	HIK	2	(0)
2020–	B.93	121	(0)
2026–	→ Rosengård (loan)	7	(0)

International career
2014	Denmark U-19	2	(0)
2013	Denmark U-20	1	(0)
- * Club domestic league appearances and goals as of 16 November 2026

Aris Nikolaos Helling Vaporakis (born 6 January 1995) is a Danish-Greek footballer who plays as a goalkeeper for Swedish club Rosengård, on loan from Danish 2nd Division side B.93.

== Career ==
=== Club career ===
Aris joined B 1903 as a 5-year-old and played until U17 in B 1903, after which he moved on to F.C. Copenhagen. Here he played for a few seasons before moving to the Danish 1st Division club Akademisk Boldklub as a senior player. However, Vaporakis was only used in the cup tournament, as he was a reserve for Jannich Storch.

Ahead of the 2015–16 season, Vaporakis signed with FC Helsingør. He made his debut for the club in the 17th round of the 2015-16 Danish 1st Division against FC Fredericia, as the first goalkeeper, Mikkel Bruhn, had fallen ill. In his first season, Vaporakis made seven appearances. In the 2016–17 season, Vaporakis also made 7 appearances for Helsingør, contributing to their promotion to the 2017-18 Danish Superliga. In May 2017, he signed a 2-year contract extension.

In the 2017–18 season, Vaporakis was still behind Bruhn in the queue. Therefore, in April 2018, he was loaned out to Icelandic club Víkingur until the end of October. Vaporakis played the first two games in Iceland before an injury and a new competitor put an end to playing time. Therefore, he terminated his loan spell in the summer and returned home to Helsingør, with whom he terminated his contract in August 2018. He then started training with Brønshøj Boldklub.

In 2019, he was affiliated with his former club Akademisk Boldklub for a short period, after which he switched to Hellerup IK in August 2019. In January 2020 he made the move to B.93. Vaporakis made his debut in 2020 in a home match against Næsby Boldklub, where B.93 won 4–0. In the 2020/21 season Aris started in 27 of the 31 matches. In May 2024, Vaporakis had his contract extended until June 2025.

Vaporakis's contract expired in June 2025. However, on 16 July 2025, B93 confirmed that they had extended the goalkeeper's contract until June 2027.

== Personal life ==
Aris Vaporakis has a Danish mother, a Greek father and a twin brother.
