= Joonas Vahtera =

Finnish footballer (born 1996)

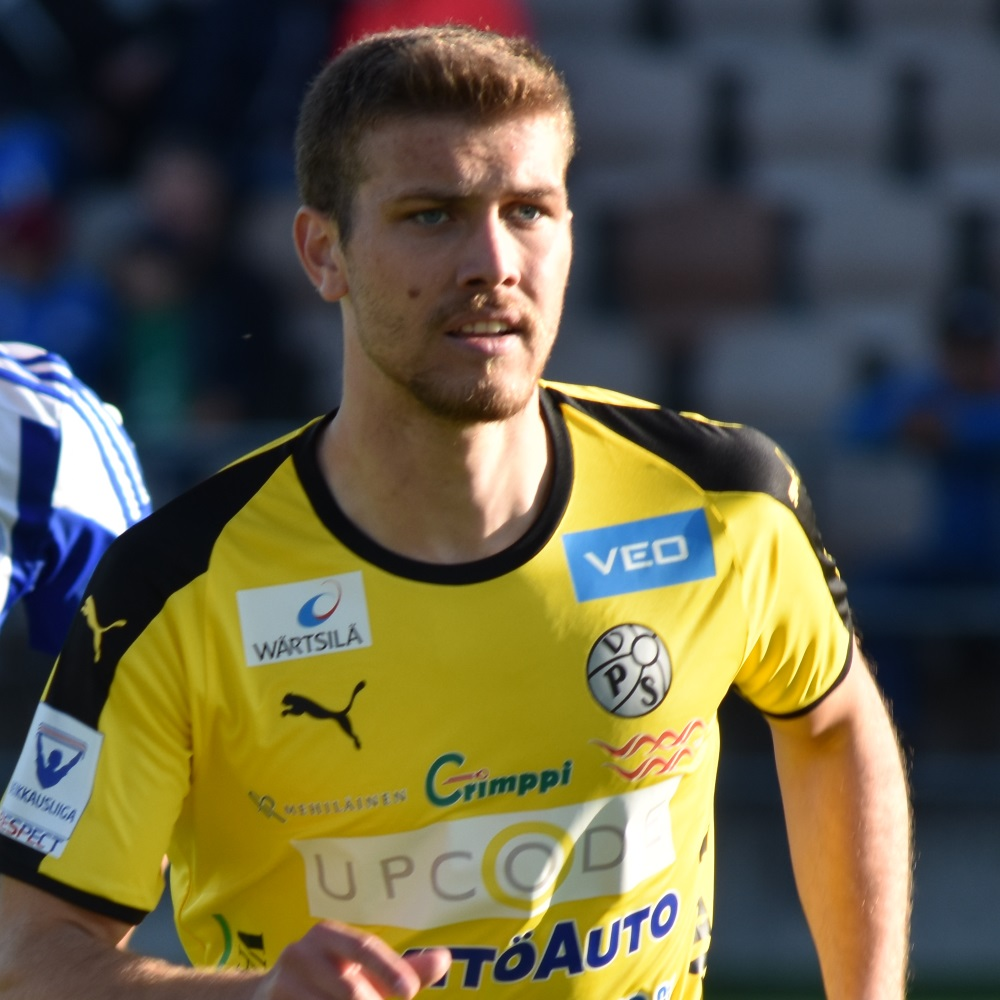
- Vahtera with VPS in 2018.

Personal information
- Full name: Joonas Eero Vahtera
- Date of birth: 6 January 1996 (age 30)
- Place of birth: Vaasa, Finland
- Height: 1.76 m (5 ft 9 in)
- Positions: Midfielder; defender

Team information
- Current team: VPS
- Number: 30

Youth career
- –2014: VPS

Senior career*
Years	Team	Apps	(Gls)
2014–2015	Vasa IFK	38	(8)
2016–2018	VPS	73	(13)
2019–2020	HJK	10	(0)
2020	→ RoPS (loan)	13	(2)
2021–	VPS	90	(11)

International career
2017	Finland U-21	4	(0)
- * Club domestic league appearances and goals as of 24 July 2026

Joonas Eero Vahtera (born 6 January 1996) is a Finnish football player who plays for VPS.

== Club career ==
He made his Veikkausliiga debut for VPS on 8 April 2016 in a game against HJK.

Vahtera signed for HJK Helsinki on 21 December 2018.

On 31 July 2020, Vahtera joined RoPS on loan for the remainder of the 2020 season.

== Career statistics ==
As of 13 November 2026

Appearances and goals by club, season and competition
Club	Season	League			Cup (Note: Includes Suomen Cup)		League cup (Note: Includes Finnish League Cup)		Europe		Total	
Club	Season	Division	Apps	Goals	Apps	Goals	Apps	Goals	Apps	Goals	Apps	Goals
Vasa IFK	2014	Kakkonen	23	5	–		–		–		23	5
Vasa IFK	2015	Ykkönen	15	3	1	0	–		–		16	3
Vasa IFK	Total		38	8	1	0	0	0	0	0	39	8
VPS	2016	Veikkausliiga	28	4	2	1	3	0	–		33	5
VPS	2017	Veikkausliiga	28	6	6	5	–		4 (Note: Appearances in UEFA Europa League)	1	38	12
VPS	2018	Veikkausliiga	17	3	1	0	–		–		18	3
VPS	Total		73	13	9	6	3	0	4	1	89	20
VPS Akatemia	2018	Kolmonen	1	0	–		–		–		1	0
HJK	2019	Veikkausliiga	7	0	5	1	–		0	0	12	1
HJK	2020	Veikkausliiga	3	0	3	0	–		–		6	0
HJK	Total		10	0	8	1	0	0	0	0	18	1
Klubi 04	2020	Kakkonen	1	0	–		–		–		1	0
RoPS (loan)	2020	Veikkausliiga	13	2	–		–		–		13	2
VPS	2021	Ykkönen	19	3	3	1	–		–		22	4
VPS	2022	Veikkausliiga	23	6	1	0	1	0	–		25	6
VPS	2023	Veikkausliiga	2	0	1	0	0	0	–		3	0
VPS	2024	Veikkausliiga	22	2	0	0	1	0	2 (Note: Appearances in UEFA Conference League)	0	25	2
VPS	2025	Veikkausliiga	7	0	0	0	3	0	–		10	0
VPS	2026	Veikkausliiga	17	0	5	3		0	–		22	3
VPS	Total		90	11	10	4	5	0	2	0	107	15
VPS Akatemia	2021	Kolmonen	2	1	–		–		–		2	1
Career total			228	35	28	11	8	0	6	1	270	47
