= FC Rosengård 1917 =

FC Rosengård
- Full name: Fotboll Club Rosengård 1917
- Founded: 4 September 1917; 109 years ago, as Malmö Boll & Idrottsförening
- Ground: Rosengårds Södra IP, Malmö
- Manager: Amir Poursamad & Ivica Kurtović (caretakers)
- League: Ettan Södra
- 2026: Ettan Södra, 6th of 16
Home colours	Away colours

Fotboll Club Rosengård 1917 is a Swedish professional football club located in the area Rosengård of Malmö. The club was founded on 4 September 1917 as Malmö Boll & Idrottsförening but has since been merged once and renamed twice. The club has been the starting ground for some Swedish football players including Zlatan Ibrahimović, Yksel Osmanovski and Labinot Harbuzi.

== History ==
The club was founded on 4 September 1917 as Malmö Boll & Idrottsförening, or MBI in short. In the early years, the club also played bandy, winning the Scania district championship in this sport in 1930.

One of the biggest moments in the history of the club was when they participated in the playoff to Allsvenskan, the top tier of Swedish football in 1938 against Degerfors IF but lost.

In 1973, the club moved to its present location in the suburb of Rosengård.

In 2001, the club merged with Turk Anadolu FF to create Malmö Anadolu BI, MABI in short.

In 2008, the club was renamed to FC Rosengård.

The club is affiliated to the Skånes Fotbollförbund.

In the end of 2025, FC Rosengård 1917’s members approve a joint investment from PARKEN Sport & Entertainment and Danir, who is also with FC Copenhagen.

== Season to season ==
Season	Level	Division	Section	Position	Movements
1996	Tier 5	Division 4	Skåne Sydvästra	3rd	Promotion Playoff
1997	Tier 5	Division 4	Skåne Sydvästra	1st	Promoted
1998	Tier 4	Division 3	Södra Götaland	7th	
1999	Tier 4	Division 3	Södra Götaland	8th	
2000	Tier 4	Division 3	Södra Götaland	12th	Relegated
2001	Tier 5	Division 4	Skåne Södra	3rd	
2002	Tier 5	Division 4	Skåne Södra	1st	Promoted
2003	Tier 4	Division 3	Södra Götaland	1st	Promoted
2004	Tier 3	Division 2	Södra Götaland	11th	Relegated
2005	Tier 4	Division 3	Södra Götaland	1st	Promoted
2006	Tier 4	Division 2	Södra Götaland	2nd	
2007	Tier 4	Division 2	Södra Götaland	1st	Promoted
2008	Tier 3	Division 1	Södra	4th	
2009	Tier 3	Division 1	Södra	8th	
2010	Tier 3	Division 1	Södra	5th	
2011	Tier 3	Division 1	Södra	12th	Relegated
2012	Tier 4	Division 2	Södra Götaland	5th	
2013	Tier 4	Division 2	Södra Götaland	2nd	
2014	Tier 4	Division 2	Södra Götaland	2nd	
2015	Tier 4	Division 2	Södra Götaland	4th	
2016	Tier 4	Division 2	Södra Götaland	2nd	Promoted

* League restructuring in 2006 resulted in a new division being created at Tier 3 and subsequent divisions dropping a level.

== Attendances ==
In the following seasons FC Rosengård have had the following average attendances:

Season	Average attendance	Division / Section	Level
2003	248	Div 3 Södra Götaland	Tier 4
2004	412	Div 2 Södra Götaland	Tier 3
2005	213	Div 3 Södra Götaland	Tier 4
2006	239	Div 2 Södra Götaland	Tier 4
2007	225	Div 2 Södra Götaland	Tier 4
2008	242	Div 1 Södra	Tier 3
2009	453	Div 1 Södra	Tier 3
2010	454	Div 1 Södra	Tier 3
2011	452	Div 1 Södra	Tier 3
2012	364	Div 2 Södra Götaland	Tier 4
2013	459	Div 2 Södra Götaland	Tier 4
2014	421	Div 2 Södra Götaland	Tier 4

* Attendances are provided in the Publikliga sections of the Svenska Fotbollförbundet website.

== Current squad ==
Updated 1 August, 2026
Note: Flags indicate national team as defined under FIFA eligibility rules; some limited exceptions apply. Players may hold more than one non-FIFA nationality.

No.	Pos.	Nation	Player
1	GK	DEN	Anton Mayland
2	DF	SWE	William Lindberg
3	DF	SWE	Kalle Larsson
4	DF	SWE	Jens Lyndard
6	MF	FIN	Matias Ritari
7	FW	NGR	Emmanuel Onotu
8	DF	SWE	Erik Persson
9	FW	SWE	Joel Voelkerling Persson
10	MF	KOS	Argjend Malaj
11	MF	SWE	Niklas Söderberg
12	MF	SWE	Gustaf Backaliden
13	FW	NGR	Emmanuel Igbonekwu
14	MF	SWE	Ludvig Carlius
15	FW	SWE	Mattias Andersson

No.	Pos.	Nation	Player
16	GK	SWE	Hugo Dahlberg
17	MF	SWE	Yoel Embaye
19	DF	SWE	Rasmus Bonde
20	FW	SLE	Alie Dumbuya
21	DF	SWE	Ismail Ljajic
22	MF	KEN	Humphrey Aroko
23	MF	SWE	Otto Håkansson
25	MF	DEN	Frederik Petersen
26	FW	GHA	Ziyad Salifu (on loan from Degerfors)
28	DF	SWE	Kevin Pasalic
29	MF	SWE	Sakariya Adan
30	GK	SWE	Alexander Cederfeldt
42	DF	SWE	Graham Ankamafio (on loan from Copenhagen)
44	GK	DEN	Aris Vaporakis (on loan from B.93)

=== Out on loan ===
Note: Flags indicate national team as defined under FIFA eligibility rules; some limited exceptions apply. Players may hold more than one non-FIFA nationality.

No.	Pos.	Nation	Player
16	MF	ALB	Altin Lataj (at Högaborgs BK until 30 November 2026)

=== Technical staff ===
as of 3 April 2017

Name	Role
(Sweden) William Bergendahl	Head coach
(Brazil) Álvaro Santos	Assistant coach
(Sweden) Fadama Dorzla	Goalkeeper coach
(Sweden) Nick Parvizi	Assistant Analyst
(Sweden) Rezhen Tawfeeq	Physiotherapist
(Sweden) Ingvar "Jeppe" Jepsson	Equipment Manager

== Club records ==
- Most appearances: 520 — Mats Olsson
