= Robbie Malolo =

Finnish footballer (born 2001)

Personal information
- Date of birth: 3 May 2001 (age 25)
- Place of birth: Finland
- Position: Central midfielder

Youth career
- –2017: HJK
- 2018: SJK

Senior career*
Years	Team	Apps	(Gls)
2018–2021	SJK II	79	(5)
2018–2021	SJK	0	(0)
2022	KPV	2	(0)
2023–2024	Gnistan	16	(0)
2024	→ Gnistan II	1	(0)
2024	→ PK Keski-Uusimaa (loan)	2	(0)

International career^{‡}
2018	Finland U18	2	(0)
- * Club domestic league appearances and goals as of 19 October 2024 ‡ National team caps and goals as of 24 February 2024

Robbie Malolo (born 3 May 2001) is a Finnish professional football player who most recently played as a midfielder for Veikkausliiga side Gnistan.

== Club career ==
After playing with HJK Helsinki youth sector, Malolo moved to Seinäjoki and signed with SJK Akatemia on 7 March 2018.

On 11 March 2022, he signed with Kokkolan Pallo-Veikot (KPV).

On 2 February 2023, Malolo signed with IF Gnistan in second-tier Ykkönen. On 21 December 2023, his deal with Gnistan was extended, and subsequently Gnistan were promoted to top-tier Veikkausliiga for the 2024 season.

== International career ==
Malolo has represented Finland at under-18 youth international level in 2018.

== Personal life ==
Born and raised in Finland, Malolo is of Congolese descent. His olders brothers Jeremie and Obed are also footballers.

== Honours ==
Gnistan

- Ykkönen runner-up: 2023
