= Martin Kompalla =

German-born Polish footballer

Personal information
- Date of birth: 26 August 1992 (age 34)
- Place of birth: Mönchengladbach, Germany
- Height: 1.86 m (6 ft 1 in)
- Position: Goalkeeper

Youth career
- 1998–2011: Borussia Mönchengladbach

Senior career*
| Years | Team | Apps | (Gls) |
| 2011–2016 | Borussia Mönchengladbach II | 68 | (0) |
| 2016–2018 | VfL Bochum | 0 | (0) |
| 2018 | Straelen | 11 | (0) |
| 2019 | VPS | 23 | (0) |
| 2020 | RoPS | 6 | (0) |
| Total | | 108 | (0) |

International career
| 2009 | Poland U17 | 1 | (0) |
| 2009–2010 | Poland U18 | 2 | (0) |
- * Club domestic league appearances and goals

Martin Kompalla (born 26 August 1992) is a former professional footballer who played as a goalkeeper. Born in Germany, he represented Poland as a youth international.

== Career ==
On 10 February 2020, Kompalla signed for RoPS, making 8 appearances in all competitions before leaving the club by mutual consent on 12 August of the same year.

== Career statistics ==
=== Club ===
Appearances and goals by club, season and competition
| Club | Season | League | | | National cup | | Other | | Total | |
| Club | Season | Division | Apps | Goals | Apps | Goals | Apps | Goals | Apps | Goals |
|---|---|---|---|---|---|---|---|---|---|---|
| Borussia Mönchengladbach II | 2011–12 | Regionalliga West | 0 | 0 | — | | — | | 0 | 0 |
| Borussia Mönchengladbach II | 2012–13 | Regionalliga West | 13 | 0 | — | | — | | 13 | 0 |
| Borussia Mönchengladbach II | 2013–14 | Regionalliga West | 2 | 0 | — | | — | | 2 | 0 |
| Borussia Mönchengladbach II | 2014–15 | Regionalliga West | 26 | 0 | — | | — | | 26 | 0 |
| Borussia Mönchengladbach II | 2015–16 | Regionalliga West | 27 | 0 | — | | — | | 27 | 0 |
| Borussia Mönchengladbach II | Total | | 68 | 0 | 0 | 0 | 0 | 0 | 68 | 0 |
| VfL Bochum | 2016–17 | 2. Bundesliga | 0 | 0 | 0 | 0 | — | | 0 | 0 |
| VfL Bochum | 2017–18 | 2. Bundesliga | 0 | 0 | 0 | 0 | — | | 0 | 0 |
| VfL Bochum | Total | | 0 | 0 | 0 | 0 | 0 | 0 | 0 | 0 |
| Straelen | 2018–19 | Regionalliga West | 11 | 0 | — | | — | | 11 | 0 |
| VPS | 2019 | Veikkausliiga | 23 | 0 | 7 | 0 | 0 | 0 | 30 | 0 |
| RoPS | 2020 | Veikkausliiga | 6 | 0 | 2 | 0 | 0 | 0 | 8 | 0 |
| Career total | | | 108 | 0 | 9 | 0 | 0 | 0 | 117 | 0 |
