= Jonni Peräaho =

Finnish footballer (born 1994)

Personal information
- Date of birth: 5 February 1994 (age 32)
- Place of birth: Uusikaupunki, Finland
- Height: 1.70 m (5 ft 7 in)
- Position: Midfielder

Youth career
- TPS

Senior career*
Years	Team	Apps	(Gls)
2013–2020	TPS	119	(8)
2013	→ Åbo IFK (loan)	11	(0)
2014	→ Åbo IFK (loan)	17	(2)
2015	→ SalPa (loan)	4	(0)
- * Club domestic league appearances and goals as of 23:36, 24 December 2020 (UTC)

Jonni Peräaho (born 5 February 1994) is a Finnish professional footballer who plays as a midfielder.
