= Mikkel Bruhn =

Danish footballer (born 1990)

Personal information
- Date of birth: 16 October 1990 (age 36)
- Place of birth: Denmark
- Height: 2.00 m (6 ft 7 in)
- Position: Goalkeeper

Youth career
- FC Nordsjælland

Senior career*
Years	Team	Apps	(Gls)
2009–2010	Allerød FK		
2010–2012	Espergærde IF		
2015–2020	Helsingør	95	(0)
2019–2020	→ Næstved BK (loan)	17	(0)
2020–2021	Hvidovre IF	2	(0)
- * Club domestic league appearances and goals as of 17:32, 13 January 2021 (UTC)

Mikkel Bruhn (born 16 October 1990) is a Danish footballer.

== Career ==
=== Club career ===
On 22 August 2019, Bruhn joined Danish 1st Division club Næstved BK on a loan deal for the rest of the season. Bruhn then joined Hvidovre IF on 2 September 2020. However, his contract was terminated by mutual consent on 13 January 2021.
