= Tuomas Kaukua =

Finnish footballer (born 2000)

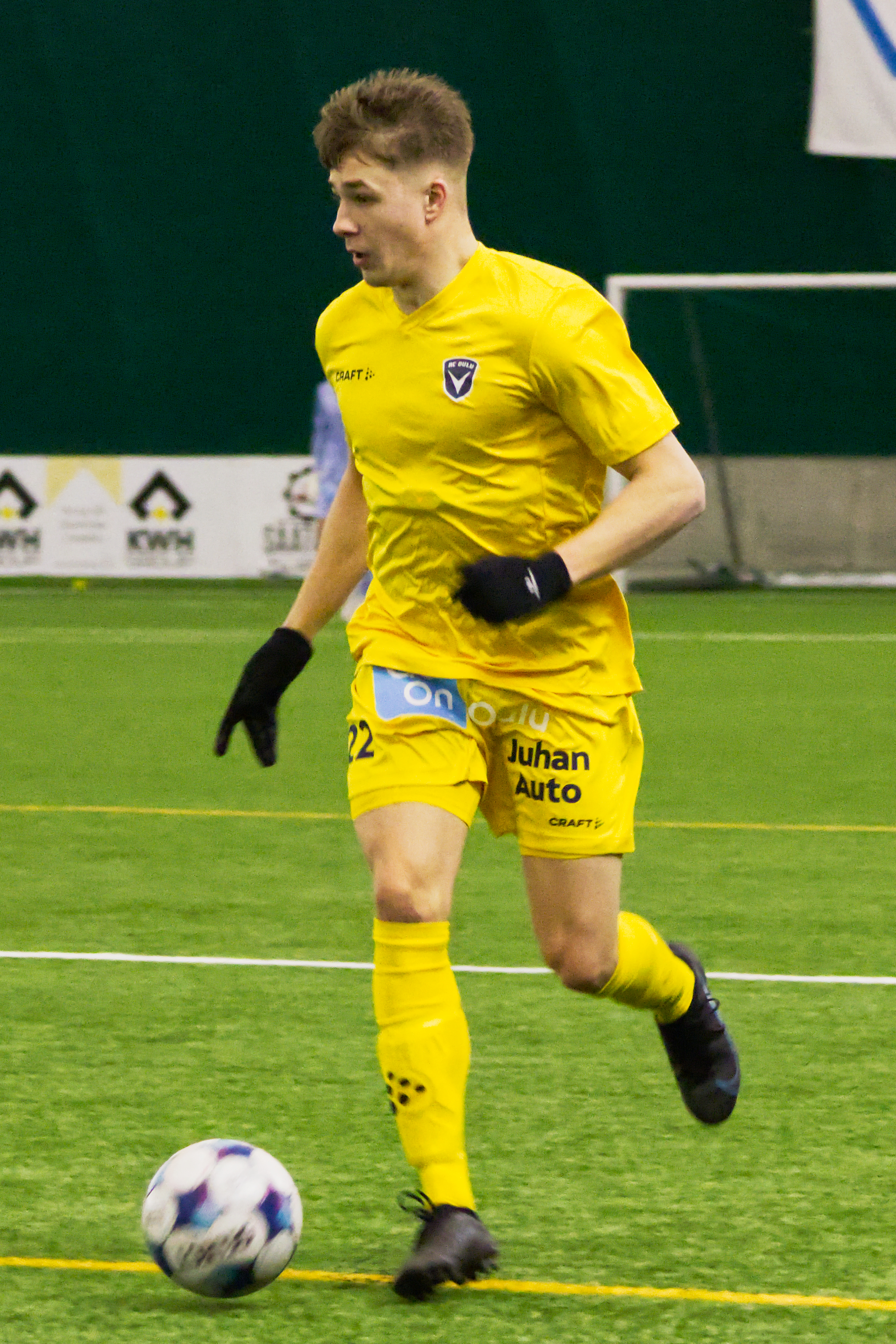
- Kaukua in 2025

Personal information
- Full name: Tuomas Kaukua
- Date of birth: 13 October 2000 (age 26)
- Place of birth: Rovaniemi, Finland
- Height: 1.76 m (5 ft 9 in)
- Position: Winger

Team information
- Current team: AC Oulu
- Number: 22

Youth career
- –2019: RoPS

Senior career*
Years	Team	Apps	(Gls)
2018–2020	RoPS II	32	(6)
2019–2021	RoPS	49	(4)
2022–2024	SJK	59	(7)
2022–2024	SJK II	5	(0)
2025–	AC Oulu	50	(3)
Medal record
RoPS
Second place	Ykkönen	2021
- * Club domestic league appearances and goals as of 12 November 2026

Tuomas Kaukua (born 13 October 2000) is a Finnish professional footballer who plays as a winger for Veikkausliiga club AC Oulu.

== Club career ==
Kaukua played in the youth sectors of Rovaniemen Palloseura, FC Lynx and FC Santa Claus.

He started his professional career in his hometown club RoPS in Veikkausliiga in 2019. After RoPS got relegated and faced some serious financial difficulties in the end of 2021, Kaukua signed a contract with SJK Seinäjoki, on a one-year deal with an option to extend it. On 6 October 2022, his deal was extended until the end of 2024.

On 5 November 2024, Kaukua signed with Veikkausliiga club AC Oulu on a two-year deal with a one-year option.

== Career statistics ==
As of 26 February 2025

Appearances and goals by club, season and competition
Club	Season	League			Cup (Note: Includes Suomen Cup)		League cup (Note: Includes Finnish League Cup)		Europe		Total	
Club	Season	Division	Apps	Goals	Apps	Goals	Apps	Goals	Apps	Goals	Apps	Goals
RoPS II	2018	Kolmonen	17	4	–		–		–		17	4
RoPS II	2019	Kakkonen	11	2	3	1	–		–		14	3
RoPS II	2020	Kakkonen	4	0	–		–		–		4	0
RoPS II	Total		32	6	3	1	0	0	0	0	35	7
RoPS	2019	Veikkausliiga	5	0	–		–		–		5	0
RoPS	2020	Veikkausliiga	18	2	–		–		–		18	2
RoPS	2021	Ykkönen	26	2	1	0	–		–		27	2
RoPS	Total		49	4	1	0	0	0	0	0	50	4
SJK	2022	Veikkausliiga	22	6	2	1	4	0	3 (Note: Appearances in UEFA Europa Conference League)	0	31	7
SJK	2023	Veikkausliiga	22	0	1	1	4	1	–		27	2
SJK	2024	Veikkausliiga	15	1	5	0	4	0	–		24	1
SJK	Total		59	7	8	2	12	1	3	0	82	10
SJK Akatemia	2022	Ykkönen	2	0	–		–		–		2	0
SJK Akatemia	2024	Ykkösliiga	3	0	–		–		–		3	0
SJK Akatemia	Total		5	0	0	0	0	0	0	0	5	0
AC Oulu	2025	Veikkausliiga	0	0	0	0	5	0	–		5	0
Career total			145	17	12	3	17	1	3	0	177	21
