= Veka Pyyny =

Finnish footballer (born 2000)

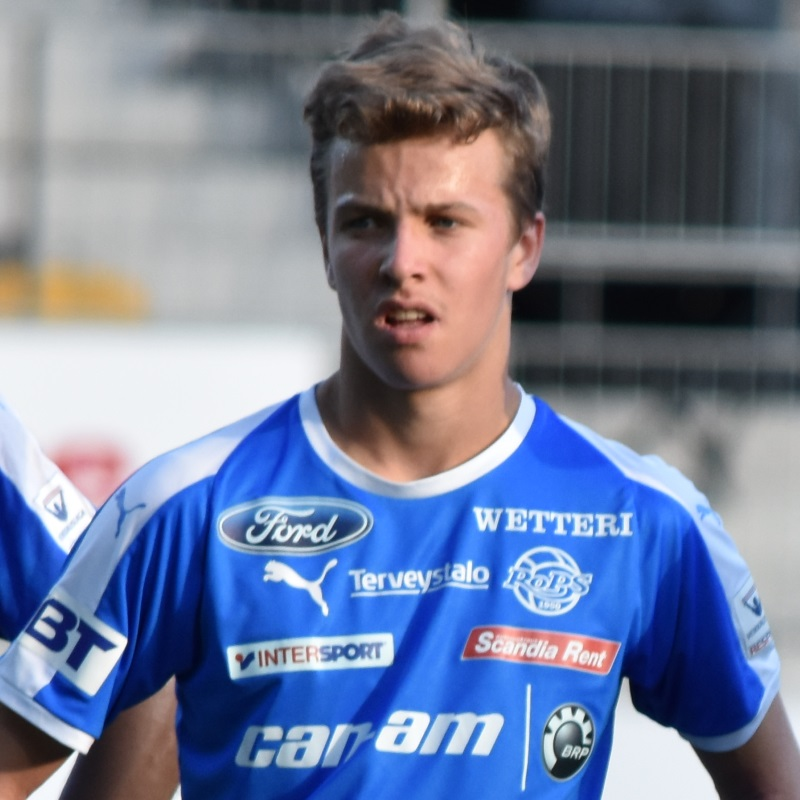
- Pyyny with RoPS in 2018.

Personal information
- Date of birth: 4 January 2000 (age 26)
- Position: Midfielder

Team information
- Current team: RoPS

Senior career*
| Years | Team | Apps | (Gls) |
| 2018– | RoPS | 2 | (0) |
- * Club domestic league appearances and goals as of 10:15, 12 June 2018 (UTC)

Veka Pyyny (born 4 January 2000) is a Finnish professional footballer who plays for RoPS, as a midfielder.
