= Arinse Uade =

English-Nigerian footballer

Personal information
- Full name: Obasiarinse Idehaloise Uade
- Date of birth: 26 December 1995 (age 30)
- Place of birth: London, England
- Height: 1.83 m (6 ft 0 in)
- Position: Defender

Youth career
- Norsemen
- 2008–2014: Arsenal

Senior career*
Years	Team	Apps	(Gls)
2014	SJK Seinäjoki	0	(0)
2014	→ SJK Akatemia	4	(0)
2015	Ilkeston Town		
2015–2016	Norwich City	0	(0)
2016	Eastbourne Borough	4	(0)
2016	Lewes	14	(0)
2017	Tilbury	5	(0)
2017	Harrow Borough	1	(0)
2017	Ashford United	1	(0)
2018	Céltiga	4	(0)
2019	Harlow Town	3	(0)
2020	RoPS	0	(0)
2020	Rampla Juniors	0	(0)

International career
- Nigeria U17
- * Club domestic league appearances and goals as of 10:54, 13 August 2020 (UTC)

Obasiarinse Idehaloise Uade (born 26 December 1995), commonly known as Arinse Uade, is an English professional footballer who plays as a left back.

In July 2020, he became the first Englishman to sign a contract in Uruguay in the professional era.

== Club career ==
In 2008, Uade joined the academy at Arsenal, after beginning his career at amateur club Norsemen. Uade joined Finnish side SJK in the summer of 2014, playing four times for their B team in the Kakkonen.

After returning to England, he joined Ilkeston Town in January 2015. In December 2015, he returned to the professional game, signing for Norwich City on a deal until the end of the season.

In the summer of 2016, he joined National League South side Eastbourne Borough, playing four matches. He then spent the rest of the year with Lewes, making 15 appearances in all competitions. He finished the season with Tilbury, making five appearances.

In 2017, Uade played for Isthmian League clubs Harrow Borough and Ashford United. In 2018, Tercera División club Céltiga signed Uade, with Uade making four league appearances for the club, before returning to England to sign for Harlow Town. He went on to make 3 appearances.

At the end of 2019, Uade returned to Finland once again, to join up with RoPS ahead of the 2020 season.

However, before making any appearances for RoPS, Uade became the first Englishman to sign a contract in Uruguay in the professional era when he joined Uruguayan Segunda División side Rampla Juniors. He left the club the following month without making a competitive appearance.

== International career ==
Uade represented Nigeria at under-17 level.
