= Alexander Nilsson (footballer, born 1997) =

Swedish footballer

Personal information
- Full name: Eric Alexander Stefan Nilsson
- Date of birth: 22 August 1997 (age 29)
- Position: Goalkeeper

Team information
- Current team: Rosengård
- Number: 30

Senior career*
Years	Team	Apps	(Gls)
2014–2019	IFK Hässleholm	62	(0)
2019	→ Helsingborgs IF (loan)	0	(0)
2020–2022	Helsingborgs IF	15	(0)
2022	→ Jönköpings Södra IF (loan)	15	(0)
2023–2024	Jönköpings Södra IF	18	(0)
2024–2025	HamKam	3	(0)
2026–	Rosengård	18	(0)
- * Club domestic league appearances and goals as of 16 November 2026

Alexander Nilsson (born 22 August 1997) is a Swedish professional footballer who plays for Rosengård.
