= Bubacar Djaló =

Portuguese footballer

Personal information
- Full name: Bubacar Boi Djaló
- Date of birth: 2 February 1997 (age 29)
- Place of birth: Bissau, Guinea-Bissau
- Height: 1.88 m (6 ft 2 in)
- Position: Defensive midfielder

Team information
- Current team: Paços de Ferreira
- Number: 25

Youth career
- 2005–2011: Odivelas
- 2011–2016: Sporting CP
- 2012–2014: → Sacavenense (loan)

Senior career*
Years	Team	Apps	(Gls)
2015–2018	Sporting CP B	41	(0)
2020–2021	HJK	30	(0)
2022	Rochester NY	23	(1)
2023–2024	Lahti	30	(2)
2024–2025	Al-Tadamon SC	21	(0)
2025–2026	Radnički Niš	3	(0)
2026–	Paços de Ferreira	1	(0)

International career
2015	Portugal U18	3	(0)
2015	Portugal U19	2	(0)
- * Club domestic league appearances and goals as of 13 September 2026

Bubacar Boi Djaló (born 2 February 1997) is a professional footballer who plays as a defensive midfielder for Liga 3 club Paços de Ferreira. Born in Guinea-Bissau, he has represented Portugal at junior international levels.

== Career ==
=== Sporting B ===
On 9 December 2015, Djaló made his professional debut with Sporting B in a 2015–16 Segunda Liga match against Desportivo das Aves coming on as a substitute for Daniel Podence.

=== HJK ===
In December 2019 it was confirmed that Djaló had joined Finnish Veikkausliiga club, HJK in Helsinki, from the 2020 season, signing a one-year deal with an option for two further years. On 26 January 2022, his contract with HJK was terminated by mutual consent.

=== Rochester NY ===
On 7 February 2022, Djaló moved to the United States and signed with Rochester NY.

=== FC Lahti ===
On 27 January 2023, Djaló returned to Finland and signed a one-year contract with Lahti. On 5 October 2023, Lahti exercised their option and Djaló's contract was extended for the 2024 Veikkausliiga season. Djalo was named The Best Player of The Season of FC Lahti in 2023.

== Career statistics ==
As of 8 August 2024

Appearances and goals by club, season and competition
Club	Season	League			National cup (Note: Includes Suomen Cup and US Open Cup)		League cup (Note: Includes Finnish League Cup)		Continental		Other		Total	
Club	Season	Division	Apps	Goals	Apps	Goals	Apps	Goals	Apps	Goals	Apps	Goals	Apps	Goals
Sporting B	2015–16	LigaPro	7	0	–		–		–		–		7	0
Sporting B	2016–17	LigaPro	18	0	–		–		–		–		18	0
Sporting B	2017–18	LigaPro	16	0	–		–		–		–		16	0
Sporting B	Total		41	0	0	0	0	0	0	0	0	0	41	0
Klubi 04	2020	Kakkonen	1	1	–		–		–		–		1	1
Klubi 04	2021	Ykkönen	3	0	–		–		–		–		3	0
Klubi 04	Total		4	1	0	0	0	0	0	0	0	0	4	1
HJK	2020	Veikkausliiga	17	0	5	0	–		–		–		22	0
HJK	2021	Veikkausliiga	13	0	2	0	–		2 (Note: Includes UEFA Champions League and UEFA Europa Conference League)	0	–		17	0
HJK	Total		30	0	7	0	0	0	2	0	0	0	39	0
Rochester NY	2022	MLS Next Pro	23	1	3	0	–		–		1 (Note: Appearance in MLS Next Pro Playoffs)	0	27	1
Lahti	2023	Veikkausliiga	22	2	1	0	3	0	–		–		26	2
Lahti	2024	Veikkausliiga	8	0	1	0	5	0	–		–		14	0
Lahti	Total		30	2	2	0	8	0	0	0	0	0	40	2
Al-Tadamon	2024-25	Kuwaiti Premier League	0	0	—	—	—	—	—	—	—	—	0	0
Career total			128	4	12	0	8	0	2	0	1	0	151	4
