= Matias Tamminen =

Finnish footballer (born 2001)

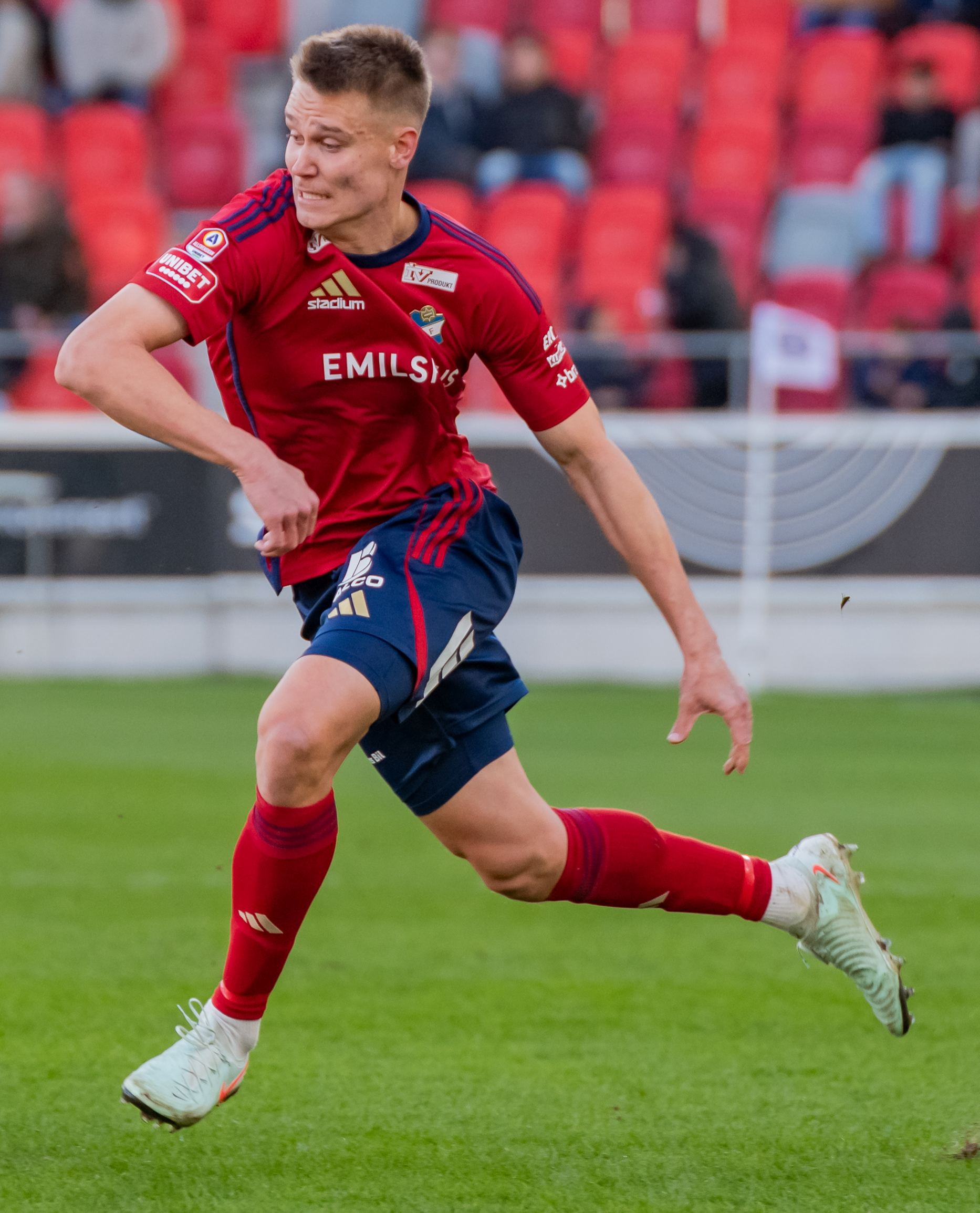
- Tamminen with Öster in 2025

Personal information
- Date of birth: 21 November 2001 (age 24)
- Place of birth: Kotka, Finland
- Height: 1.93 m (6 ft 4 in)
- Positions: Forward; winger

Team information
- Current team: Öster
- Number: 19

Youth career
- –2018: KTP

Senior career*
Years	Team	Apps	(Gls)
2018	KTP	7	(1)
2018	→ MyPa (loan)	1	(0)
2018	→ HaPK (loan)	3	(1)
2019–2020	RoPS	35	(5)
2019–2020	RoPS II	9	(7)
2021–2024	Inter Turku	82	(9)
2021	→ KTP (loan)	11	(0)
2021	→ PeKa (loan)	2	(2)
2025–	Öster	49	(8)
- * Club domestic league appearances and goals as of 11 November 2026

Matias Tamminen (born 21 November 2001) is a Finnish professional footballer who plays as a winger for Superettan club Öster.

== Career ==
=== KTP ===
Born in Kotka, Tamminen started playing football in a youth sector of his hometown club Kotkan Työväen Palloilijat (KTP). He made his senior debut with the club's first team in 2018, when the club played in second-tier Ykkönen.

=== RoPS ===
In early 2019, he joined Rovaniemen Palloseura (RoPS) in Veikkausliiga, and during the season featured with the first team and the reserve team in Kakkonen.

=== Inter Turku ===
On 17 December 2020, fellow Veikkausliiga side FC Inter Turku announced the signing of Tamminen on a three-year deal, and immediately thereafter loaned him back to KTP for the 2021 season.

In July 2022, Tamminen represented Inter Turku in UEFA Europa Conference League qualifiers. After the season, Tamminen was awarded the Anneli trophy by the club's boardroom, which is traditionally granted to the most loyal team player of the club.

On 9 January 2024, Tamminen extended his contract with Inter Turku for the 2024 season. After the season, he was awarded for the most assists of the season, by the Football Association of Finland.

=== Östers IF ===
On 18 December 2024, Tamminen signed with Allsvenskan club Östers IF, starting in January 2025. On 30 March 2025, Tamminen scored in his Allsvenskan debut for Öster, in a 4–3 away loss against IFK Norrköping.

== Career statistics ==
As of 18 May 2025

Appearances and goals by club, season and competition
Club	Season	League			Cup (Note: Includes Suomen Cup)		League cup (Note: Includes Finnish League Cup)		Europe		Total	
Club	Season	Division	Apps	Goals	Apps	Goals	Apps	Goals	Apps	Goals	Apps	Goals
KTP	2018	Ykkönen	7	1	2	0	—		—		9	1
MYPA (loan)	2018	Kakkonen	1	0	—		—		—		1	0
Haminan Pallo-Kissat (loan)	2018	Kolmonen	3	1	—		—		—		3	1
RoPS	2019	Veikkausliiga	14	2	7	2	—		0	0	21	4
RoPS	2020	Veikkausliiga	21	3	4	0	—		—		25	3
RoPS	Total		35	5	11	2	–	–	0	0	46	7
RoPS II	2019	Kakkonen	8	7	—		—		—		8	7
RoPS II	2020	Kakkonen	1	0	—		—		—		1	0
RoPS II	Total		9	7	–	–	–	–	–	–	9	7
Inter Turku	2021	Veikkausliiga	0	0	0	0	—		0	0	0	0
Inter Turku	2022	Veikkausliiga	27	5	5	1	5	0	2 (Note: Appearance(s) in UEFA Europa Conference League)	0	39	6
Inter Turku	2023	Veikkausliiga	28	2	3	0	2	0	—		33	2
Inter Turku	2024	Veikkausliiga	27	2	3	1	5	0	—		35	3
Inter Turku	Total		82	9	11	2	12	0	2	0	107	11
KTP (loan)	2021	Veikkausliiga	11	0	3	0	—		—		14	0
Peli-Karhut (loan)	2021	Kakkonen	2	2	—		—		—		2	2
Östers IF	2025	Allsvenskan	8	1	0	0	—		—		8	1
Career total			162	26	27	4	11	0	2	0	202	30

== Honours ==
Inter Turku

- Finnish League Cup: 2024
- Finnish League Cup runner-up: 2022
- Finnish Cup runner-up: 2022, 2024
