= Jami Kyöstilä =

Finnish footballer (born 1996)

Personal information
- Date of birth: 3 February 1996 (age 30)
- Place of birth: Lammi, Finland
- Height: 1.73 m (5 ft 8 in)
- Position: Defender

Senior career*
Years	Team	Apps	(Gls)
2013–2014	FC Hämeenlinna	28	(0)
2015–2021	FC Haka	113	(2)
2022	HJS	14	(2)
2022	FF Jaro	8	(0)
- * Club domestic league appearances and goals as of 8 October 2022

Jami Kyöstilä (born 2 March 1996) is a Finnish footballer who plays as a defender.

== Club career ==
On 3 February 2022, Kyöstilä joined HJS in the third-tier Kakkonen.

== Honours ==
FC Haka

- Ykkönen: 2019
