= Jussi Niska =

Finnish footballer (born 2002)

Personal information
- Full name: Jussi Erkki Niska
- Date of birth: 15 August 2002 (age 24)
- Place of birth: Rovaniemi, Finland
- Height: 1.80 m (5 ft 11 in)
- Position: Left-back

Team information
- Current team: Inter Turku
- Number: 2

Youth career
- FC Santa Claus
- –2019: RoPS

Senior career*
Years	Team	Apps	(Gls)
2019–2020	RoPS II	7	(0)
2020–2021	RoPS	36	(0)
2022–	Inter Turku	129	(7)

International career^{‡}
2018	Finland U16	2	(0)
2018	Finland U17	4	(0)
2023–2025	Finland U21	8	(0)
2025–	Finland	1	(0)
Medal record
RoPS
Second place	Ykkönen	2021
Inter Turku
Second place	Finnish League Cup	2022
Second place	Finnish Cup	2022
- * Club domestic league appearances and goals as of 12 November 2026 ‡ National team caps and goals as of 18 November 2025

Jussi Erkki Niska (born 15 August 2002) is a Finnish professional footballer who plays as a left-back for Veikkausliiga club Inter Turku and the Finland national team.

== Club career ==
=== RoPS ===
Born in Rovaniemi, Niska played for the youth teams of FC Lynx, who later became part of FC Santa Claus, and RoPS. He debuted in Veikkausliiga for the RoPS first team on 2 July 2020 at the age of 17, in a 3–1 away defeat against Inter Turku.

After RoPS got relegated in 2020, Niska stayed with the club in Ykkönen in the 2021 season, finishing 2nd in the division, but eventually falling short to AC Oulu in the promotion play-offs.

=== FC Inter Turku ===
Niska signed a three-year deal with Inter Turku in Veikkausliiga on 23 December 2021, after RoPS faced some serious financial difficulties and were relegated to Kakkonen. On 6 July 2022, Niska scored the winning goal as Inter Turku defeated Drita 1–0 in the 1st leg of the 2022–23 UEFA Europa Conference League 1st round qualifying match. On 8 October 2024, his contract was extended for the 2025 with an option for 2026.

== International career ==
A regular Finnish youth international, Niska has represented Finland in various age brackets.

== Career statistics ==
As of 11 May 2026

Appearances and goals by club, season and competition
Club	Season	League			National cup (Note: Includes Suomen Cup)		League cup (Note: Includes Finnish League Cup)		Europe		Total	
Club	Season	Division	Apps	Goals	Apps	Goals	Apps	Goals	Apps	Goals	Apps	Goals
RoPS II	2019	Kakkonen	6	0	—		—		—		6	0
RoPS II	2020	Kakkonen	1	0	—		—		—		1	0
RoPS II	Total		7	0	0	0	0	0	0	0	7	0
RoPS	2020	Veikkausliiga	20	0	5	0	—		—		25	0
RoPS	2021	Ykkönen	16	0	4	0	—		—		20	0
RoPS	Total		36	0	9	0	0	0	0	0	45	0
Inter Turku	2022	Veikkausliiga	21	1	2	1	6	0	2 (Note: Appearance(s) in UEFA Europa Conference League)	1	31	3
Inter Turku	2023	Veikkausliiga	22	0	2	0	6	0	—		30	0
Inter Turku	2024	Veikkausliiga	24	0	6	0	2	0	—		32	0
Inter Turku	2025	Veikkausliiga	31	5	1	0	7	0	–		39	5
Inter Turku	2026	Veikkausliiga	7	1	0	0	6	0	0	0	13	1
Inter Turku	Total		105	7	11	1	27	0	2	1	145	9
Career total			148	5	22	1	27	0	2	1	197	9

=== International ===
As of match played 18 November 2025

Finland
Year	Apps	Goals
2025	1	0
Total	1	0

== Honours ==
RoPS

- Ykkönen runner-up: 2021

Inter Turku

- Finnish Cup runner-up: 2022, 2024
- Finnish League Cup: 2024, 2025
- Finnish League Cup runner-up: 2022
