= Rico Finnäs =

Finnish footballer (born 2000)

Personal information
- Date of birth: 14 October 2000 (age 26)
- Place of birth: Jyväskylä, Finland
- Height: 1.76 m (5 ft 9 in)
- Position: Left-back

Team information
- Current team: HIFK
- Number: 29

Youth career
- Real Murcia
- Elche
- Ranero

Senior career*
Years	Team	Apps	(Gls)
2019	MYPA	8	(0)
2020	HJK	1	(0)
2020–2021	Klubi 04	22	(0)
2021–2022	KTP	37	(2)
2023–	HIFK	61	(3)

International career
- Finland U21
- * Club domestic league appearances and goals as of 7 November 2026

Rico Finnäs (born 3 July 1997) is a Finnish professional footballer who plays as a defender for HIFK.

== Career ==
Finnäs was born in Finland and moved to Spain with his family when aged four, and started football there.

He returned to Finland in 2019 and since he has played for MYPA in Ykkönen, HJK Helsinki and KTP in Veikkausliiga and HIFK. He scored his first Veikkausliiga goal for KTP in 2021.

== Honours ==
HJK

- Veikkausliiga: 2020

KTP

- Ykkönen: 2022
