= Ferhan Hasani =

Macedonian footballer (born 1990)

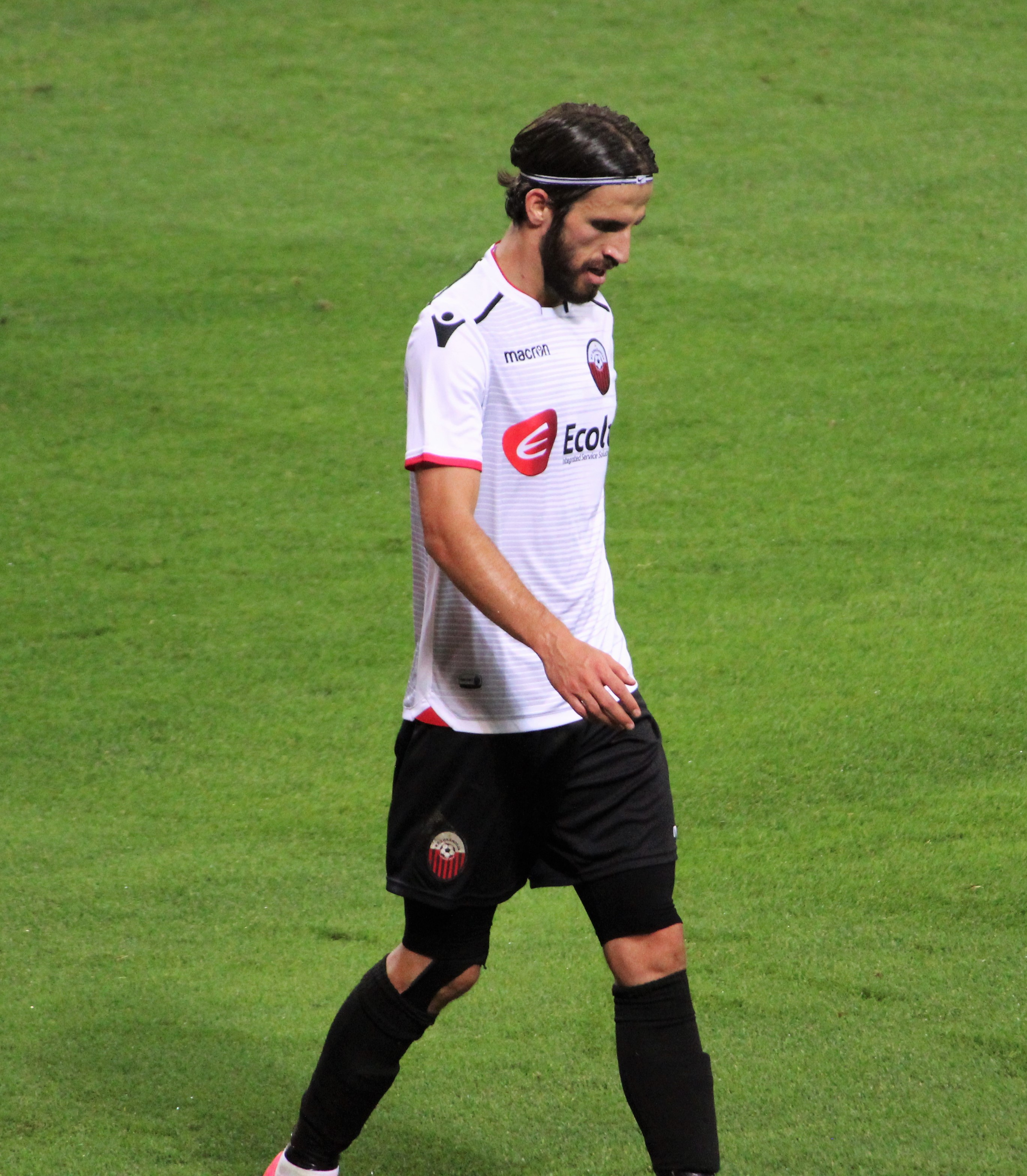
- Hasani with KF Shkëndija in 2017

Personal information
- Date of birth: 18 June 1990 (age 36)
- Place of birth: Tetovo, SR Macedonia, Yugoslavia
- Height: 1.85 m (6 ft 1 in)
- Position: Attacking midfielder

Youth career
- 1998–2007: Shkëndija

Senior career*
Years	Team	Apps	(Gls)
2010–2012	Shkëndija	42	(18)
2012–2013	VfL Wolfsburg	4	(0)
2013–2015	Brøndby IF	35	(7)
2015–2018	Shkëndija	64	(46)
2018–2019	Al-Ra'ed	24	(2)
2020	HJK	9	(5)
2021	Partizani Tirana	12	(0)
2022–2023	Shkëndija	38	(4)
2023–2024	Helsingør	15	(2)
Total		244	(86)

International career
2006	Macedonia U17		
2010–2012	Macedonia U21	13	(3)
2010–2021	North Macedonia	43	(2)
- * Club domestic league appearances and goals

Ferhan Hasani (Macedonian: Ферхан Хасани; born 18 June 1990), nicknamed Buba, is a Macedonian former professional footballer who played as a midfielder.

He made his full international debut on 22 December 2010 against China in a friendly game. He represented the nation at UEFA Euro 2020, their first major tournament.

== Personal life ==
Hasani was born in Tetovo, North Macedonia to an ethnic Albanian family. As a child, Hasani grew up with the nickname Buba (lit. 'bug' or 'beetle') because he was quicker on the ball than his peers. Hasani joined Shkëndija at the age of 8.

== Club career ==
=== Shkëndija ===
When Shkëndija were in the Macedonian Second League, Hasani got his chance to play for the senior squad when he was 17 years old. In the second of his two seasons with the senior squad, Hasani scored 13 goals in 27 matches, establishing himself as best striker in the team and an important contributor to Shkëndija's championship 2010–11 season, earning Shkëndija promotion to the Macedonian First League. He became a fan favourite by scoring a goal from a free kick against rivals FK Vardar in the final game of the season. During the half time of the game against Metalurg, Hasani was presented as the best player of the season.

There was some speculation that Croatian club Hajduk Split and German club VfL Wolfsburg, were interested in signing the striker, as well as Dutch side FC Groningen and Gent of Belgium. However, Hasani remained at Shkendija for the first half of the new season. The season started well until he suffered an injury that kept him out of the squad until the latter half of the year. Hasani contributed five goals and eight assists for his club that season before leaving in the winter break.

=== VfL Wolfsburg ===
On 16 December 2011, Hasani agreed to a three-year deal with Wolfsburg and joined the German club immediately after the New Year. Wolfsburg manager, Felix Magath, stated that new acquisitions Hasani and Slobodan Medojević were "two young players who have played exceptionally well in their respective leagues and are talents from whose we expect to be great players".

On 30 September 2012, Hasani made his debut for Wolfsburg, coming on in the 45th minute against Mainz 05.

During the 2012–13 season's winter transfer period, Hasani received interest from Croatian club Dinamo Zagreb. It was reported that Wolfsburg and Dinamo have agreed terms and all that remains is a medical test on 25 January. Dinamo coach Kruno Jurčić stated "He is a winger who can play on both sides and he's the kind of player we need. I've seen him when I was working for Croatia national team and was scouting Macedonia so when an opportunity came to sign him we didn't hesitate". But the transfer failed.

With the Wolfsburg squad being reduced and not receiving much match time, Hasani planned to leave in the summer, with possible interests from Dynamo Dresden and Brøndby.

=== Brøndby IF ===
==== 2013–14 season ====
On 2 September 2013, Hasani decided to join Brøndby IF. According to Danish media the transfer fee was €260K. He signed a two-year contract and was presented the jersey number 22. Hasani debuted on 15 September 2013 and scored his first goal after only two minutes of play, as he became matchwinner with a goal in the 65th minute against Odense Boldklub.

==== 2014–15 season ====
After a successful pre-season, in which he scored against Liverpool, Hasani succumbed to injury missing out on the beginning of the season.

On 7 December, Hasani returned and Brøndby defeated Silkeborg IF 1–0. Hasani scored the goal on what was the 50th anniversary of Brøndby. Ferhan had a successful season with Brøndby reaching third in the Superliga.

=== Return to Shkëndija ===
In the 2017–18 season, Ferhan led Shkëndija to winning the league and cup. He scored 22 goals in 27 matches and made 15 assists. With his contract over and achieve all trophies in the league, it is suspected that Ferhan will leave, with interest from Galatasaray.

=== Al-Ra'ed ===
On 17 August 2018, Hasani agreed to terms with Saudi Arabian side Al-Ra'ed.

=== HJK ===
On 18 October 2019, HJK announced the signing of Hasani on a one-year contract.

=== Partizani Tirana ===
On 26 January 2021, he signed for FK Partizani.

=== Second return to Shkëndija ===
On 6 January 2022, he returned to Shkëndija once again.

=== FC Helsingør ===
On 2 June 2023, Hassani joined Danish 1st Division side FC Helsingør on a two-year contract After the club was relegated to the 2024-25 Danish 2nd Division, it was announced in August 2024 that Hasani had left the club.

In February 2025, Hasani announced his retirement from football on social media.

== International career ==
Hasani made his full international debut on 22 December 2010 against China in a friendly match. At the end of the football season, Hasani was called up to the Macedonian squad for the upcoming fixture with Ireland for the UEFA Euro 2012 qualifiers. He came on as a substitute in the tenth minute and Macedonia went on to lose 0–2 to Ireland. With Macedonia effectively out of the qualifications of the UEFA Euro 2012, Hasani was called to play for the Under-21s team against Serbia for the UEFA European Under-21 Football Championship qualifiers. Hasani was crucial as he scored for Macedonia, resulting in a 1–1 draw.

On 29 February 2012, Hasani scored his first goal in an away friendly against Luxembourg as Macedonia suffered a 1–2 defeat.

== Career statistics ==
=== Club ===
Appearances and goals by club, season and competition
Club	Season	League			National cup (Note: Includes Macedonian Football Cup, Saudi King's Cup, Suomen Cup and Danish Cup)		Continental		Other		Total	
Club	Season	Division	Apps	Goals	Apps	Goals	Apps	Goals	Apps	Goals	Apps	Goals
Shkëndija	2010–11	Macedonian First League	28	13	–		–		–		28	13
Shkëndija	2011–12	Macedonian First League	14	5	0	0	2 (Note: Includes UEFA Champions League)	0	1 (Note: Includes Macedonian Football Supercup)	0	17	5
Shkëndija	Total		42	18	0	0	2	0	1	0	45	18
VfL Wolfsburg	2012–13	Bundesliga	4	0	0	0	–		–		4	0
Brøndby	2013–14	Danish Superliga	19	4	0	0	0	0	–		19	4
Brøndby	2014–15	Danish Superliga	16	3	0	0	1 (Note: Includes UEFA Europa League)	0	–		17	3
Brøndby	Total		35	7	0	0	1	0	0	0	36	7
Shkëndija	2015–16	Macedonian First League	11	12	1	0	2	0	–		14	12
Shkëndija	2016–17	Macedonian First League	27	12	4	1	8	2	–		39	15
Shkëndija	2017–18	Macedonian First League	27	22	3	0	8	3	–		38	25
Shkëndija	Total		65	46	8	1	18	5	0	0	91	52
Al-Ra'ed	2018–19	Saudi Pro League	24	2	2	1	–		–		26	3
Al-Ra'ed	2019–20	Saudi Pro League	0	0	0	0	–		–		0	0
Al-Ra'ed	Total		24	2	2	1	0	0	0	0	26	3
HJK Helsinki	2020	Veikkausliiga	9	5	6	2	0	0	–		15	7
Partizani Tirana	2020–21	Kategoria Superiore	12	0	–		–		–		12	0
Shkëndija	2021–22	Macedonian First League	13	2	–		–		–		13	2
Shkëndija	2022–23	Macedonian First League	25	2	–		6 (Note: Includes UEFA Europa Conference League)	2	–		31	4
Shkëndija	Total		38	4	0	0	6	2	0	0	44	6
Helsingør	2023–24	Danish 1st Division	15	2	1	1	–		–		16	3
Career total			244	86	17	5	27	7	1	0	289	98

=== International ===
As of 9 October 2016

Appearances and goals by national team and year
National team	Year	Apps	Goals
North Macedonia
North Macedonia	2010	1	0
North Macedonia	2011	5	0
North Macedonia	2012	8	1
North Macedonia	2013	4	0
North Macedonia	2014	1	0
North Macedonia	2015	4	0
North Macedonia	2016	3	1
Total		26	2

=== International goals ===
As of match played 9 October 2016
Scores and results list North Macedonia's goal tally first, score column indicates score after each Hasani goal.

List of international goals scored by Ferhan Hasani
No.	Date	Venue	Cap	Opponent	Score	Result	Competition	Ref.
1	29 February 2012	Stade Josy Barthel, Luxembourg City, Luxembourg	7	Luxembourg	1–0	1–2	Friendly	
2	9 October 2016	Philip II Arena, Skopje, Macedonia	26	Italy	2–1	2–3	2018 FIFA World Cup qualification	

== Honours ==
Shkendija

- Macedonian First League: 2010–11, 2017–18
- Macedonian Football Cup: 2015–16, 2017-18
- Macedonian Super Cup: 2010–11

HJK Helsinki

- Veikkausliiga: 2020
- Finnish Cup: 2020

Individual

- Macedonian Footballer of the Year (domestic league): 2011
