= Niilo Saarikivi =

Finnish footballer (born 2003)

Personal information
- Date of birth: 6 June 2003 (age 23)
- Place of birth: Finland
- Height: 1.69 m (5 ft 7 in)
- Position: Winger

Team information
- Current team: Honka
- Number: 10

Youth career
- –2014: FC WILD
- 2014–2020: Honka

Senior career*
Years	Team	Apps	(Gls)
2020–2023	Honka II	30	(7)
2020–2023	Honka	35	(0)
2024	TPS	13	(2)
2025–	Honka	24	(26)

International career^{‡}
2018–2019	Finland U16	5	(0)
2019–2020	Finland U17	12	(0)
2021-2022	Finland U19	8	(1)
- * Club domestic league appearances and goals as of 8 November 2026 ‡ National team caps and goals as of 19 February 2024

Niilo Saarikivi (born 6 June 2003) is a Finnish professional footballer who plays as a winger for Kakkonen club Honka.

== Club career ==
Saarikivi played in the youth sector of FC Honka, and continued his senior career with the club's reserve team in third-tier Kakkonen. During 2020–2023, he made a total of 35 league appearances with Honka first team in Veikkausliiga, before the club was suddenly declared for bankruptcy after the 2023 season.

On 8 January 2024, Saarikivi signed with Turun Palloseura (TPS), competing in the new second tier Ykkösliiga.

== Honours ==
=== Honka ===
- Finnish League Cup: 2022
- Finnish Cup runner-up: 2023
