= Obed Malolo =

Finnish footballer (born 1997)

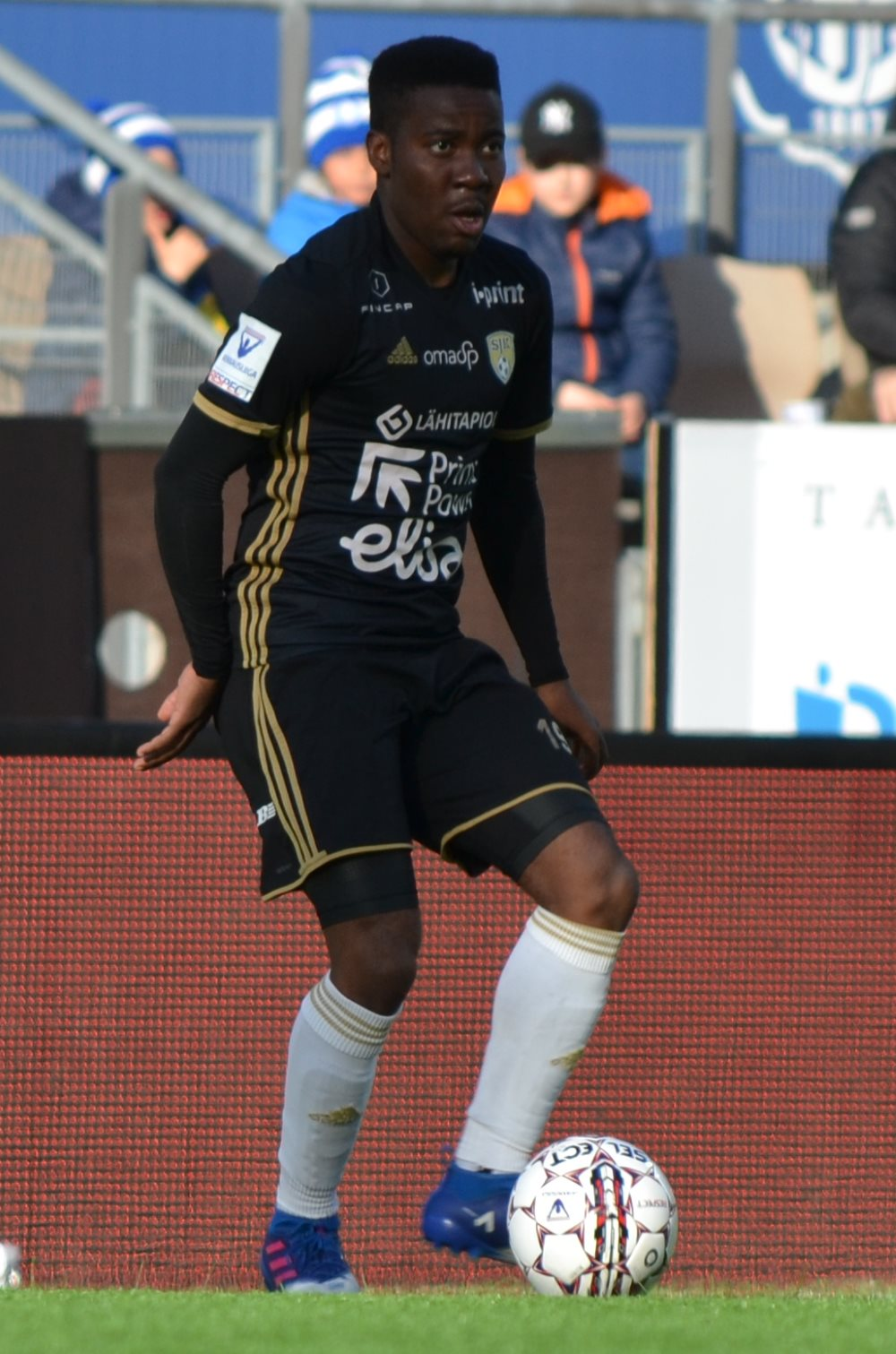

Personal information
- Date of birth: 18 April 1997 (age 29)
- Place of birth: Helsinki, Finland
- Height: 1.73 m (5 ft 8 in)
- Position: Midfielder

Team information
- Current team: HIFK
- Number: 6

Youth career
- 2004–2005: Allianssi
- 2006–2013: HJK

Senior career*
Years	Team	Apps	(Gls)
2013–2017	HJK	34	(0)
2013–2015	→ Klubi-04	33	(1)
2017–2019	SJK	36	(1)
2020	RoPS	19	(0)
2021	AC Oulu	25	(0)
2022–	HIFK	33	(0)

International career
2012	Finland U15	2	(0)
2012–2013	Finland U16	19	(0)
2014	Finland U17	6	(2)
2015–2016	Finland U18	5	(0)
2017	Finland U21	1	(0)
- * Club domestic league appearances and goals as of 27 November 2023

Obed Malolo (born 18 April 1997) is a Finnish football player who plays as a midfielder for HIFK.

== Club career ==
On 7 January 2022, he signed a one-year contract with HIFK.

== Personal life ==
He is of Congolese descent. His younger brother Robbie Malolo is also a professional footballer.

== Career statistics ==
As of match played 13 February 2016

Appearances and goals by club, season and competition
Club	Season	League			National Cup		League Cup		Continental		Other		Total	
Club	Season	Division	Apps	Goals	Apps	Goals	Apps	Goals	Apps	Goals	Apps	Goals	Apps	Goals
HJK	2013	Veikkausliiga	0	0	0	0	0	0	0	0	—		0	0
HJK	2014	Veikkausliiga	4	0	0	0	4	0	—		—		8	0
HJK	2015	Veikkausliiga	15	0	3	0	4	0	1	0	—		23	0
HJK	2016	Veikkausliiga	0	0	0	0	3	0	0	0	—		3	0
HJK	Total		19	0	3	0	11	0	1	0	0	0	34	0
Klubi-04 (loan)	2013	Kakkonen	21	1	0	0	—		—		—		0	0
Klubi-04 (loan)	2014	Kakkonen	8	0	0	0	—		—		—		0	0
Klubi-04 (loan)	2015	Kakkonen	4	0	0	0	—		—		—		0	0
Klubi-04 (loan)	Total		33	1	0	0	0	0	0	0	0	0	33	1
Career total			52	1	3	0	11	0	1	0	0	0	67	1
