= Saibaa Keita =

Norwegian footballer (born 1997)

Personal information
- Full name: Saibaa Maudo Keita
- Date of birth: 22 October 1997 (age 29)
- Place of birth: Oslo, Norway
- Height: 1.81 m (5 ft 11 in)
- Position: Forward

Youth career
- 2011–2016: Strømsgodset
- 2014: → Drammen (youth loan)

Senior career*
Years	Team	Apps	(Gls)
2017	Arka Gdynia	0	(0)
2017	→ Egersund (loan)	5	(0)
2018	Triestina	0	(0)
2018–2019	Poli Timișoara	11	(1)
2019	Uni. Craiova		
2020	Haka	9	(1)
2021	Pyli Kos		
2022–2023	Panionios		
2024	Vyzas		
- * Club domestic league appearances and goals as of 22 October 2024

Saibaa Maudo Keita (born 22 October 1997) is a Norwegian professional footballer who plays as a forward.

== Personal life ==
Born in Norway, Keita is of Gambian descent.

== Career statistics ==
As of match played 12 September 2020

Appearances and goals by club, season and competition
Club	Season	League			National cup (Note: Includes Finnish Cup)		Other		Total	
Club	Season	Division	Apps	Goals	Apps	Goals	Apps	Goals	Apps	Goals
Arka Gdynia	2016–17	Ekstraklasa	0	0	0	0	0	0	0	0
Arka Gdynia	2017–18	Ekstraklasa	0	0	0	0	0	0	0	0
Arka Gdynia	Total		0	0	0	0	0	0	0	0
Egersunds (loan)	2017	2. divisjon	5	0	0	0	0	0	5	0
Triestina	2017–18	Serie C	0	0	0	0	0	0	0	0
Poli Timișoara	2018–19	Liga II	11	1	0	0	0	0	11	1
Haka	2020	Veikkausliiga	9	1	7	0	0	0	16	1
Career total			25	2	7	0	0	0	32	2
