= Jakob Tånnander =

Swedish footballer

Personal information
- Date of birth: 10 August 2000 (age 26)
- Place of birth: Dalby, Sweden
- Height: 1.95 m (6 ft 5 in)
- Position: Goalkeeper

Team information
- Current team: Farense
- Number: 30

Youth career
- –2014: Dalby GIF
- 2015: Lunds BK
- 2015–2017: Malmö FF

Senior career*
Years	Team	Apps	(Gls)
2015	Lunds BK	12	(0)
2017–2020	Malmö FF	0	(0)
2017	→ Österlen FF (loan)	22	(0)
2018–2019	→ Lunds BK (loan)	37	(0)
2020–2022	HJK	9	(0)
2020–2022	→ Klubi 04	5	(0)
2020	→ FC Haka (loan)	11	(0)
2023–2024	Sirius	41	(0)
2025	Cremonese	0	(0)
2025–	Farense	1	(0)

International career^{‡}
2015–2017	Sweden U17	14	(0)
2017–2018	Sweden U19	4	(0)
- * Club domestic league appearances and goals as of 6 February 2026 ‡ National team caps and goals as of 26 November 2020

Jakob Tånnander (born 10 August 2000) is a Swedish footballer who plays as a goalkeeper for Liga Portugal 2 club Farense.

== Club career ==
On 19 January 2022, Tånnander extended his contract with HJK Helsinki for the 2022 Veikkausliiga season.

On 9 December 2022, he signed a two-year contract with IK Sirius.

On 25 August 2025, Tånnander signed with Liga Portugal 2 club Farense.

== Career statistics ==
As of 18 February 2025

Appearances and goals by club, season and competition
Club	Season	League			Cup (Note: Includes Svenska Cupen and Suomen Cup)		Europe		Other		Total	
Club	Season	Division	Apps	Goals	Apps	Goals	Apps	Goals	Apps	Goals	Apps	Goals
Lunds BK	2015	Ettan	1	0	0	0	–		–		1	0
Malmö FF	2017	Allsvenskan	0	0	0	0	0	0	–		0	0
Malmö FF	2018	Allsvenskan	0	0	0	0	0	0	–		0	0
Malmö FF	2019	Allsvenskan	0	0	0	0	0	0	–		0	0
Malmö FF	2020	Allsvenskan	0	0	0	0	0	0	–		0	0
Malmö FF	Total		0	0	0	0	0	0	0	0	0	0
Lunds BK (loan)	2018	Ettan	18	0	0	0	–		–		18	0
Lunds BK (loan)	2019	Ettan	19	0	0	0	–		–		19	0
Lunds BK (loan)	Total		37	0	0	0	0	0	0	0	37	0
HJK	2020	Veikkausliiga	0	0	2	0	–		–		2	0
HJK	2021	Veikkausliiga	6	0	0	0	8	0	–		14	0
HJK	2022	Veikkausliiga	3	0	3	0	0	0	2	0	8	0
HJK	Total		9	0	5	0	8	0	2	0	24	0
Klubi 04	2020	Kakkonen	2	0	–		–		–		2	0
Klubi 04	2021	Ykkönen	1	0	–		–		–		1	0
Klubi 04	2022	Kakkonen	2	0	–		–		–		2	0
Klubi 04	Total		5	0	0	0	0	0	0	0	5	0
FC Haka (loan)	2020	Veikkausliiga	11	0	0	0	–		–		11	0
Sirius	2023	Allsvenskan	19	0	3	0	–		–		22	0
Sirius	2024	Allsvenskan	22	0	2	0	–		–		24	0
Sirius	Total		41	0	5	0	0	0	0	0	46	0
Cremonese	2024–25	Serie B	0	0	0	0	–		–		0	0
Career total			104	0	10	0	8	0	2	0	124	0
