= Frankline Okoye =

Nigerian footballer

Personal information
- Full name: Frankline Okoye Chinaecherem
- Date of birth: 6 May 1999 (age 27)
- Place of birth: Nigeria
- Height: 1.90 m (6 ft 3 in)
- Position: Centre-back

Team information
- Current team: KäPa
- Number: 34

Youth career
- KuPS

Senior career*
Years	Team	Apps	(Gls)
2018–2019	KuPS	0	(0)
2018	→ KuFu-98 (loan)	15	(0)
2019	Tammeka II	3	(0)
2019	Tammeka	27	(3)
2020–2021	IFK Mariehamn	27	(0)
2022	Jaro	22	(2)
2023	Umeå	2	(0)
2024–2025	PK-35	31	(1)
2025–	KäPa	7	(0)
- * Club domestic league appearances and goals as of 22:23, 6 December 2025 (UTC)

Frankline Okoye Chinaecherem (born 6 May 1999) is a Nigerian footballer who plays as a centre-back for Ykkösliiga club KäPa.

== Club career ==
=== KuPS ===
On the last day of the January 2018 transfer market, Okoye joined Finnish club KuPS on a three-year deal, until the end of 2020. Okoye played the 2018 season for KuPS' farm team, KuFu-98, who played in the Kakkonen. Okoye made 15 appearances for the team in the 2018 season.

Okoye's contract with KuPS was terminated by the end of the year.

=== Tammeka ===
After leaving KuPS, Okoye went to Estonia and joined Tartu JK Tammeka on a trial period in the beginning of 2019. In February, it was reported, that Okoye wouldn't get a contract with the club. However, one month later, in March 2019, it was confirmed that he had signed an official deal with the club.

19-year old Okoye quickly became a key player for the club and made 27 league appearances in the 2019 season, 20 of the from start, and scored three goals.

=== IFK Mariehamn ===
In December 2019, Okoye returned to Finland to join Veikkausliiga club IFK Mariehamn on trial. On 2 January 2020, he signed a permanent deal until the end of 2021, with an option for one further year.

=== Jaro ===
On 27 January 2022, he signed with Jaro for the 2022 season.

=== Umeå ===
On 28 March 2023, Okoye signed a two-year contract with Umeå in Sweden. After a disappointing stay, which saw just 61 minutes of playing time over two games, the club confirmed on June 12, 2023 that the parties had terminated the agreement by mutual consent.
