= Matias Niemelä =

Finnish footballer (born 2002)

Personal information
- Date of birth: 15 March 2002 (age 24)
- Place of birth: Espoo, Finland
- Height: 1.89 m (6 ft 2 in)
- Position: Goalkeeper

Team information
- Current team: Grindavík (on loan from Vestri)
- Number: 1

Youth career
- –2013: Kasiysi
- 2015–2018: Espoo

Senior career*
Years	Team	Apps	(Gls)
2018–2019	Espoo	12	(0)
2018–2019	Espoo II	4	(0)
2019–2022	Klubi 04	11	(0)
2020	→ RoPS (loan)	11	(0)
2020	→ RoPS II (loan)	3	(0)
2022	HJK	0	(0)
2023	KTP	6	(0)
2024	TPS	23	(0)
2025–	Vestri	0	(0)
2025	→ Grindavík (loan)	20	(0)

International career^{‡}
2018–2019	Finland U17	11	(0)
2019	Finland U18	1	(0)
- * Club domestic league appearances and goals as of 10 September 2025 ‡ National team caps and goals as of 19 February 2024

Matias Niemelä (born 15 March 2002) is a Finnish professional footballer who plays as a goalkeeper for Icelandic club Grindavík, on loan from Vestri.

== Club career ==
In his early career, Niemelä played for FC Espoo and Klubi 04, and eventually made his Veikkausliiga debut with RoPS in the 2020 season, when he was loaned out to the club.

On 8 November 2022, Niemelä signed with newly promoted Veikkausliiga club Kotkan Työväen Palloilijat (KTP).

In January 2024, he signed with Turun Palloseura (TPS) in the new second tier Ykkösliiga.
