= Rasmus Degerman =

Finnish footballer (born 2001)

Personal information
- Date of birth: 23 April 2001 (age 25)
- Position: Midfielder

Team information
- Current team: RoPS

Senior career*
Years	Team	Apps	(Gls)
2017–	RoPS	2	(0)
- * Club domestic league appearances and goals as of 10:15, 12 June 2018 (UTC)

Rasmus Degerman (born 23 April 2001) is a Finnish professional footballer who plays for RoPS, as a midfielder.
