= Gustaf Backaliden =

Swedish footballer

Personal information
- Date of birth: 15 September 1997 (age 29)
- Place of birth: Malmö, Sweden
- Height: 1.86 m (6 ft 1 in)
- Position: Midfielder

Team information
- Current team: Rosengård
- Number: 12

Senior career*
Years	Team	Apps	(Gls)
2014–2016	Kvarnby IK	49	(6)
2017–2018	IFK Malmö	50	(7)
2019–2020	IFK Mariehamn	42	(5)
2021	SJK	11	(0)
2022	VPS	11	(0)
2022–2023	Torns IF	10	(1)
2023–	Rosengård	100	(3)
- * Club domestic league appearances and goals as of 16 November 2026

Gustaf Backaliden (born 15 September 1997) is a Swedish footballer who plays for Rosengård.

== Club career ==
On 31 January 2022, he signed a contract for 2022 season with VPS, with an option for 2023. His contract was terminated by mutual consent in August 2022.
