= Aati Marttinen =

Finnish footballer (born 1997)

Personal information
- Full name: Aati Kasperi Marttinen
- Date of birth: 26 December 1997 (age 28)
- Place of birth: Turku, Finland
- Position: Goalkeeper

Team information
- Current team: Inter Turku II

Senior career*
Years	Team	Apps	(Gls)
2015	ÅIFK	13	(0)
2016–2021	Inter Turku	20	(0)
2017	→ Peimari United (loan)	5	(0)
2018	→ FC Haka (loan)	17	(0)
2022	TPS	11	(0)
2023–	Inter Turku II	0	(0)
- * Club domestic league appearances and goals as of 8 October 2022

Aati Kasperi Marttinen (born 26 December 1997) is a Finnish professional footballer who plays as a goalkeeper for Inter Turku II.

== Career ==
Marttinen has played for ÅIFK and Inter Turku.

On 14 January 2022, he signed with TPS for the 2022 season.
