= 2019 SJK season =

SJK
2019 season
- Chairman: Raimo Sarajärvi
- Manager: Aleksei Yeryomenko (until 16 August); Brian Page (from 16 August)
- Stadium: OmaSP Stadion
- Veikkausliiga: 9th
- Finnish Cup: Sixth Round
- Top goalscorer: League: Denys Oliynyk (8); All: Denys Oliynyk (10)
| Home colours | Away colours |

The 2019 season is Seinäjoen Jalkapallokerho's 12th competitive season, and sixth in the Veikkausliiga.

== Season events ==
On 16 August, Aleksei Yeryomenko left his role as manager by mutual consent, with Brian Page being appointed in his place.

== Squad ==
As of 26 September 2019

Note: Flags indicate national team as defined under FIFA eligibility rules; some limited exceptions apply. Players may hold more than one non-FIFA nationality.

| No. | Pos. | Nation | Player |
|---|---|---|---|
| 1 | GK | FIN | Jesse Öst |
| 2 | DF | FIN | Joel Mero |
| 3 | DF | SEN | Seynabou Benga |
| 5 | DF | FIN | Dani Hatakka |
| 6 | MF | GHA | Jude Arthur (on loan from Liberty Professionals) |
| 9 | FW | BRA | Matheus Batista (on loan from Atlético Tubarão) |
| 10 | FW | ENG | Billy Ions |
| 11 | FW | UKR | Denys Oliynyk |
| 14 | MF | FIN | Maximo Tolonen |
| 15 | DF | EST | Trevor Elhi |
| 16 | DF | FIN | Joonas Sundman |
| 17 | DF | FIN | Ville Tikkanen |
| 18 | DF | FIN | Jarkko Hurme (3rd captain) |

| No. | Pos. | Nation | Player |
|---|---|---|---|
| 19 | MF | FIN | Obed Malolo |
| 21 | FW | FIN | Oskar Pihlaja |
| 22 | GK | FIN | Severi Ikäheimo |
| 23 | DF | CIV | Boris Kadio |
| 25 | MF | FIN | Daniel Håkans |
| 26 | MF | FIN | Jesse Sarajärvi |
| 27 | MF | FIN | Joona Lautamaja |
| 29 | FW | FIN | Jeremiah Streng |
| 30 | DF | BRA | Nadson |
| 33 | GK | EST | Mihkel Aksalu (Vice-captain) |
| 49 | MF | GEO | Zakaria Beglarishvili (on loan from Flora) |
| 58 | MF | FIN | Mehmet Hetemaj (Captain) |
| 77 | FW | USA | Dion Acoff |

== Transfers ==
=== In ===
| Date | Position | Nationality | Name | From | Fee | Ref. |
|---|---|---|---|---|---|---|
| 31 January 2019 | MF | (Finland) | Moshtagh Yaghoubi | HJK | Free | |
| 15 February 2019 | FW | (United States) | Dion Acoff | Valur | Undisclosed | |
| 3 March 2019 | DF | (Brazil) | Nadson | Krylia Sovetov | Free | |
| 10 March 2019 | MF | (Finland) | Daniel Håkans | SJK Akatemia | Promoted | |
| 10 March 2019 | FW | (Finland) | Jeremiah Streng | SJK Akatemia | Promoted | |
| 3 April 2019 | DF | (Estonia) | Trevor Elhi | Botev Vratsa | Undisclosed | |
| 6 July 2019 | DF | (Senegal) | Seynabou Benga | Ekenäs IF | Undisclosed | |

=== Loans in ===
| Date | Position | Nationality | Name | From | End date | Ref. |
|---|---|---|---|---|---|---|
| 11 January 2019 | MF | (Ghana) | Jude Arthur | Liberty Professionals | End of Season | |
| 25 January 2019 | MF | (Finland) | Sergei Eremenko | Spartaks Jūrmala | 18 July 2019 | |
| 4 April 2019 | FW | (Finland) | Serge Atakayi | Rangers | 11 June 2019 | |
| 14 April 2019 | FW | (Brazil) | Matheus Batista | Atlético Tubarão | End of Season | |
| 8 August 2019 | MF | (Georgia (country)) | Zakaria Beglarishvili | Flora | End of Season | |

=== Released ===
| Date | Position | Nationality | Name | Joined | Date |
|---|---|---|---|---|---|
| 26 September 2019 | MF | (Finland) | Moshtagh Yaghoubi | HIFK | 29 November 2019 |
| 21 October 2019 | GK | (Estonia) | Mihkel Aksalu | | |
| 21 October 2019 | DF | (Estonia) | Trevor Elhi | FCI Levadia | |
| 21 October 2019 | DF | (Finland) | Jarkko Hurme | KPV | |
| 21 October 2019 | DF | (Finland) | Dani Hatakka | Honka | |
| 21 October 2019 | DF | (Finland) | Joel Mero | HIFK | |
| 21 October 2019 | MF | (Finland) | Obed Malolo | RoPS | 19 November 2019 |
| 21 October 2019 | FW | (United States) | Dion Acoff | Þróttur | 1 June 2020 |

== Friendlies ==
| | – |
| EET (UTC+3) |

== Competitions ==
=== Veikkausliiga ===
The 2019 Veikkausliiga season begins on 3 April 2019 and ends on 3 November 2019.

==== Regular season ====
| Pos | Team | Pld | W | D | L | GF | GA | GD | Pts | Qualification or relegation (Note: Teams played against each other twice (22 matches) after which the league split in two (top 6 and bottom 6 teams).) |
|---|---|---|---|---|---|---|---|---|---|---|
| 7 | HIFK | 27 | 10 | 9 | 8 | 37 | 34 | +3 | 39 | Qualification for the national Europa League qualification tournament. |
| 8 | FC Lahti | 27 | 9 | 9 | 9 | 29 | 36 | −7 | 36 | Qualification for the national Europa League qualification tournament. |
| 9 | SJK | 27 | 7 | 9 | 11 | 18 | 29 | −11 | 30 | |
| 10 | RoPS | 27 | 8 | 6 | 13 | 23 | 35 | −12 | 30 | |
| 11 | KPV (R) | 27 | 7 | 4 | 16 | 32 | 47 | −15 | 25 | Qualification for the relegation play-offs |

Source: Veikkausliiga, Soccerway
Rules for classification: 1) Points; 2) Goal difference; 3) Goals scored; 4) Head-to-head points; 5) Head-to-head goal difference; 6) Head-to-head away goals scored; 7) Play-off
(Note: Play-off is only played if need to decide champion, teams for relegation or UEFA competition and will be played on a neutral ground).
(R) Relegated

==== Results summary ====
| Overall | | | | | | | | Home | | | | | | Away | | | | | |
| Pld | W | D | L | GF | GA | GD | Pts | W | D | L | GF | GA | GD | W | D | L | GF | GA | GD |
|---|---|---|---|---|---|---|---|---|---|---|---|---|---|---|---|---|---|---|---|
| 27 | 7 | 9 | 11 | 18 | 29 | −11 | 30 | 4 | 4 | 6 | 8 | 14 | −6 | 3 | 5 | 5 | 10 | 15 | −5 |

Last updated: 19 October 2019.
Source: See Results

==== Results by matchday ====
| Round | 1 | 2 | 3 | 4 | 5 | 6 | 7 | 8 | 9 | 10 | 11 | 12 | 13 | 14 | 15 | 16 | 17 | 18 | 19 | 20 | 21 | 22 | 23 | 24 | 25 | 26 | 27 |
|---|---|---|---|---|---|---|---|---|---|---|---|---|---|---|---|---|---|---|---|---|---|---|---|---|---|---|---|
| Ground | H | A | H | H | A | H | A | A | H | A | A | A | H | A | H | A | H | A | H | H | A | H | H | A | H | A | H |
| Result | W | W | D | L | D | W | D | D | L | D | W | L | W | L | W | W | L | D | L | D | L | L | D | L | L | L | D |

Updated to match(es) played on 19 October 2019. Source: See Results
A = Away; H = Home; W = Win; D = Draw; L = Loss

==== Results ====
| 6 April 2019 1 | SJK | 1 – 0 | HIFK | Seinäjoki |
| 15:00 EET (UTC+3) | Hetemaj (yellow card) 41'; Yaghoubi (yellow card) 45'; Elhi (yellow card) 48'; Oliynyk 85' | Report | Halme (yellow card) 44'; Sesay (yellow card) 71' | Stadium: OmaSP Stadion; Attendance: 2,269; Referee: Atte Jussila |

| 13 April 2019 2 | Inter Turku | 1 – 2 | SJK | Turku |
| 15:00 EET (UTC+3) | Valenčič 86'; Tenho (yellow card) 90+6' | Report | Nadson 21' (yellow card) 90+4'; Hetemaj (yellow card) 39'; Oliynyk 44'; Streng (yellow card) 90+1' | Stadium: Veritas Stadion; Attendance: 2,280; Referee: Jari Järvinen |

| 18 April 2019 3 | SJK | 0 – 0 | HJK | Seinäjoki |
| 18:30 EET (UTC+3) | Oliynyk (yellow card) 9'; Yaghoubi (yellow card) 61'; Atakayi (yellow card) 71'; Hatakka (yellow card) 88' | Report | Singh (yellow card) 88'; Tarasov (yellow card) 88' | Stadium: OmaSP Stadion; Attendance: 3,671; Referee: Jani Laaksonen |

| 22 April 2019 4 | SJK | 0 – 1 | Ilves | Seinäjoki |
| 18:30 EET (UTC+3) | Yaghoubi (yellow card) 17'; Elhi (yellow card) 22'; Hetemaj (yellow card) 43'; Kadio (yellow card) 63' (yellow-red card) 86'; Arthur (yellow card) 66'; Hatakka (yellow card) 81' (yellow-red card) 90+1'; Oliynyk (yellow card) 87' | Report | Fofana (yellow card) 26'; Moussa (yellow card) 29'; Siira (yellow card) 50'; Lauri Ala-Myllymäki 64' | Stadium: OmaSP Stadion; Attendance: 3,104; Referee: Oskari Hämäläinen |

| 26 April 2019 5 | VPS | 1 – 1 | SJK | Vaasa |
| 18:30 EET (UTC+3) | Arthur 42' (o.g.); Kompalla (yellow card) 69'; Strandvall (yellow card) 89'; Auvinen (yellow card) 90+2' | Report | Yaghoubi 72'; Hetemaj (yellow card) 82'; Oliynyk (yellow card) 89' | Stadium: Hietalahti Stadium; Attendance: 3,432; Referee: Antti Munukka |

| 30 April 2019 6 | SJK | 1 – 0 | KPV | Seinäjoki |
| 19:00 EET (UTC+3) | Hurme (yellow card) 75'; Batista 82'; Yaghoubi (yellow card) 90' | Report | Mannström (yellow card) 45'; Pikkarainen (yellow card) 53'; Kinnunen (yellow card) 86' | Stadium: OmaSP Stadion; Attendance: 3,098; Referee: Ville Nevalainen |

| 5 May 2019 7 | Lahti | 1 – 1 | SJK | Lahti |
| 18:30 EET (UTC+3) | Coubronne (yellow card) 70'; Penninkangas 90+3' | Report | Sarajärvi (yellow card) 29'; Elhi (yellow card) 37'; Kadio (yellow card) 45+1'; Oliynyk 72' | Stadium: Lahti Stadium; Attendance: 1,452; Referee: Toni Pohjoismäki |

| 11 May 2019 8 | HJK | 2 – 2 | SJK | Helsinki |
| 15:00 EET (UTC+3) | Singh (yellow card) 34'; Nadson 44' (o.g.); Alho (yellow card) 80'; Lappalainen 90+1' | Report | Yaghoubi (yellow card) 37'; Hetemaj 60'; Lautamaja (yellow card) 67'; Atakayi 82' | Stadium: Telia 5G -areena Attendance: 3,392; Referee: Mattias Gestranius |

| 18 May 2019 9 | SJK | 1 – 2 | Honka | Seinäjoki |
| 16:00 EET (UTC+3) | Hatakka 20'; Yaghoubi (yellow card) 57'; Arthur (yellow card) 80' | Report | Sumusalo (yellow card) 49' (goal) 87'; Martín 60' | Stadium: OmaSP Stadion; Attendance: 2,888; Referee: Petri Viljanen |

| 25 May 2019 10 | RoPS | 1 – 1 | SJK | Rovaniemi |
| 17:00 EET (UTC+3) | Katz (yellow card) 43'; Muinonen (yellow card) 59' (goal) 63' | Report | Oliynyk 45+1'; Arthur (yellow card) 61'; Elhi (yellow card) 71' | Stadium: Rovaniemen keskuskenttä Attendance: 767; Referee: Mohammad Al Emara |

| 2 June 2019 11 | KuPS | 0 – 1 | SJK | Kuopio |
| 18:30 EET (UTC+3) | Diallo (yellow card) 65' | Report | Oliynyk 40'; Atakayi (yellow card) 62'; Nadson (yellow card) 90' | Stadium: Savon Sanomat Areena; Attendance: 1,890; Referee: Ville Nevalainen |

| 18 June 2019 13 | HIFK | 1 – 0 | SJK | Helsinki |
| 18:30 EET (UTC+3) | Dunsby 8'; Mäntylä (yellow card) 32'; Patronen (yellow card) 34'; Toró (yellow card) 89' | Report | Sundman (yellow card) 29'; Arthur (yellow card) 36'; Yaghoubi (yellow card) 83' | Stadium: Telia 5G -areena Attendance: 1,879; Referee: Petri Viljanen |

| 1 July 2019 14 | SJK | 2 – 1 | Inter Turku | Seinäjoki |
| 18:30 EET (UTC+3) | Hetemaj 64'; Sundman (yellow card) 66'; Oliynyk 87' (pen.); Eremenko (yellow card) 90' | Report | Hämäläinen (yellow card) 42'; Valenčič 57' | Stadium: OmaSP Stadion; Attendance: 3,944; Referee: Dennis Antamo |

| 7 July 2019 15 | Ilves | 3 – 0 | SJK | Tampere |
| 18:30 EET (UTC+3) | Ala-Myllymäki 9' (pen.), 43'; Tendeng 54'; Aspegren (yellow card) 77' | Report | Sundman (yellow card) 21'; Hetemaj (yellow card) 59'; Hatakka (yellow card) 80' | Stadium: Tammelan Stadion; Attendance: 5,011; Referee: Mohammad Al Emara |

| 13 July 2019 16 | SJK | 1 – 0 | VPS | Seinäjoki |
| 17:00 EET (UTC+3) | Sundman (yellow card) 62'; Nadson (yellow card) 72'; Oliynyk 90+5' (yellow card) 90+5' | Report | | Stadium: OmaSP Stadion; Attendance: 4,059; Referee: Marko Grönholm |

| 20 July 2019 17 | KPV | 1 – 2 | SJK | Kokkola |
| 17:00 EET (UTC+3) | Roiha 59'; Pikkarainen (yellow card) 83' | Report | Arthur 45+1' (yellow card) 90'; Elhi (yellow card) 56'; Batista 78' | Stadium: Kokkolan Keskuskenttä; Attendance: 2,852; Referee: Joni Hyytiä |

| 26 July 2019 18 | SJK | 0 – 2 | Lahti | Seinäjoki |
| 18:30 EET (UTC+3) | Hetemaj (yellow card) 55'; Arthur (yellow card) 68'; Benga (yellow card) 72' | Report | Nadson 51' (o.g.); Josu 72' (pen.); Lampinen (yellow card) 74' | Stadium: OmaSP Stadion; Attendance: 3,083; Referee: Mohammad Al Emara |

| 10 August 2019 19 | Honka | 0 – 0 | SJK | Espoo |
| 17:00 EET (UTC+3) | Aalto (yellow card) 39'; Hakola (yellow card) 69'; Baah (yellow card) 84' | Report | Arthur (yellow card) 45'; Mero (yellow card) 73' | Stadium: Tapiolan Urheilupuisto; Attendance: 2,109; Referee: Oskari Hämäläinen |

| 15 August 2019 12 | SJK | 0 – 2 | IFK Mariehamn | Seinäjoki |
| 19:00 EET (UTC+3) | Yaghoubi (yellow card) 43' | Report | M'Boma 75'; Silverholt 83' | Stadium: OmaSP Stadion; Attendance: 2,401; Referee: Petri Viljanen |
Note: Match initially scheduled to be played 14 June 2019.

| 19 August 2019 20 | SJK | 0 – 0 | RoPS | Seinäjoki |
| 18:30 EET (UTC+3) | Hatakka (yellow card) 65'; Hetemaj (yellow card) 85'; Yaghoubi (yellow card) 89' | Report | Beobide (yellow card) 19' | Stadium: OmaSP Stadion; Attendance: 2,591; Referee: Toni Pohjoismaki |

| 25 August 2019 21 | IFK Mariehamn | 1 – 0 | SJK | Mariehamn |
| 18:30 EET (UTC+3) | Mäenpää (yellow card) 38'; Sid 57' (yellow card) 65'; Sjölund (yellow card) 69'; Järvenpää (yellow card) 85' | Report | Malolo (yellow card) 35' (yellow-red card) 76' | Stadium: Wiklöf Holding Arena; Attendance: 1,208; Referee: Kalle Mäkinen |

| 31 August 2019 22 | SJK | 1 – 3 | KuPS | Seinäjoki |
| 16:00 EET (UTC+3) | Hetemaj (yellow card) 23'; Hatakka (yellow card) 39'; Tolonen 54'; Arthur (yellow card) 68' | Report | Saxman (yellow card) 43'; Purje 64', 74'; Niskanen 86' | Stadium: OmaSP Stadion; Attendance: 2,589; Referee: Petri Viljanen |

| 13 September 2019 23 | SJK | 1 – 1 | VPS | Seinäjoki |
| 18:30 EET (UTC+3) | Hetemaj (yellow card) 40'; Oliynyk 88' | Report | Lahti 14'; Voutilainen (yellow card) 64'; Lehtonen (yellow card) 70'; Lähde (yellow card) 90+6'; Sarr (yellow card) 90+6' | Stadium: OmaSP Stadion; Attendance: 2,346; Referee: Mohammad Al Emara |

| 21 September 2019 24 | HIFK | 2 – 0 | SJK | Helsinki |
| 18:00 EET (UTC+3) | Henrique 16', 29'; Kakeeto (yellow card) 53' | Report | | Stadium: Telia 5G -areena Attendance: 753; Referee: Joni Hyytiä |

| 27 September 2019 25 | SJK | 0 – 2 | KPV | Seinäjoki |
| 18:30 EET (UTC+3) | Hurme (yellow card) 40'; Oliynyk (yellow card) 59'; Sundman (yellow card) 76' | Report | Banza 24'; Memolla 33'; Vidjeskog (yellow card) 86' | Stadium: OmaSP Stadion; Attendance: 2,015; Referee: Antti Munukka |

| 6 October 2019 26 | RoPS | 1 – 0 | SJK | Rovaniemi |
| 16:00 EET (UTC+3) | Hyvärinen 20' | Report | Arthur (yellow card) 25'; Oliynyk (yellow card) 77' (yellow-red card) 78' | Stadium: Rovaniemen keskuskenttä Attendance: 1,254; Referee: Atte Jussila |

| 19 October 2019 27 | SJK | 0 – 0 | Lahti | Seinäjoki |
| 15:00 EET (UTC+3) | Hetemaj (yellow card) 22'; Malolo (yellow card) 82' | Report | Viitikko (yellow card) 36' | Stadium: OmaSP Stadion; Attendance: 1,516; Referee: Ville Nevalainen |

=== Finnish Cup ===
==== Sixth Round ====
| Team | Pld | W | D | L | GF | GA | GD | Pts |
|---|---|---|---|---|---|---|---|---|
| FC Ilves | 5 | 4 | 1 | 0 | 12 | 4 | +8 | 13 |
| VPS | 5 | 3 | 0 | 2 | 5 | 6 | −1 | 9 |
| KPV | 5 | 2 | 2 | 1 | 6 | 4 | +2 | 8 |
| RoPS | 5 | 2 | 1 | 2 | 8 | 9 | −1 | 7 |
| SJK | 5 | 0 | 2 | 3 | 7 | 10 | −3 | 2 |
| KuPS | 5 | 0 | 2 | 3 | 6 | 11 | −5 | 2 |

Source: Finnish Football Association

| 25 January 2019 1 | SJK | 1 – 2 | VPS | Seinäjoki |
| 19:00 EET (UTC+2) | Malolo (yellow card) 10'; Mero (yellow card) 40'; Arthur (yellow card) 50'; Streng 79' (yellow card) 87' | Report | Ojamaa (yellow card) 12'; Morrissey 45', 67'; Kompalla (yellow card) 45+1' | Stadium: Wallsport Areena; Attendance: 350; Referee: Jari Järvinen |

| 2 February 2019 2 | Ilves | 2 – 1 | SJK | Tampere |
| 14:30 EET (UTC+2) | Mettälä 2', 53'; Addy (yellow card) 34'; Aspegren (yellow card) 55'; E.Raittinen (yellow card) 90'; Siira (yellow card) 90+1' | Report | Oliynyk (yellow card) 34'; Arthur (yellow card) 41'; Streng 73'; Yaghoubi (yellow card) 85' (yellow-red card) 90+1' | Stadium: Pirkkahalli C Attendance: 750; Referee: Daniel Enkvist |

| 9 February 2019 3 | KuPS | 2 – 2 | SJK | Seinäjoki |
| 14:00 EET (UTC+2) | Felek (yellow card) 43'; Karjalainen 61' (pen.); Rangel 68' (pen.); Nissinen (yellow card) 86' | Report | Oliynyk 15' (yellow card) 74'; Mero (yellow card) 43'; Arthur (yellow card) 59'; Hatakka (yellow card) 68'; Streng 88' | Stadium: Wallsport Areena; Attendance: 350; Referee: Jani Laaksonen |

| 16 February 2019 4 | RoPS | 3 – 2 | SJK | Seinäjoki |
| 14:00 EET (UTC+2) | Olabisi (yellow card) 3'; Sihvonen 11' (yellow card) 89'; Sergio Llamas 44' (yellow card) 57'; Jokelainen 67'; Shishkovski (yellow card) 74' | Report | Kadio 38'; Malolo (yellow card) 63' (yellow-red card) 81'; Lautamaja 88' | Stadium: Wallsport Areena; Attendance: 350; Referee: Atte Jussila |

| 22 February 2019 5 | SJK | 1 – 1 | KPV | Seinäjoki |
| 19:00 EET (UTC+2) | Sundman (yellow card) 49'; Oliynyk 68' (yellow card) 78' | Report | Helmke 37' (yellow card) 59'; Koskimaa (yellow card) 67'; Shaze (yellow card) 81' | Stadium: Wallsport Areena; Attendance: 350; Referee: Oskari Hämäläinen |

== Squad statistics ==
As of Match played 19 October 2019

=== Appearances and goals ===
| No. | Pos | Nat | Player | Total | | Veikkausliiga | | Finnish Cup | |
| No. | Pos | Nat | Player | Apps | Goals | Apps | Goals | Apps | Goals |
|---|---|---|---|---|---|---|---|---|---|
| 1 | GK | (Finland) FIN | Jesse Öst | 15 | 0 | 12 | 0 | 3 | 0 |
| 2 | DF | (Finland) FIN | Joel Mero | 16 | 0 | 9+3 | 0 | 4 | 0 |
| 3 | DF | (Senegal) SEN | Seynabou Benga | 2 | 0 | 2 | 0 | 0 | 0 |
| 5 | DF | (Finland) FIN | Dani Hatakka | 26 | 1 | 19+2 | 1 | 5 | 0 |
| 6 | MF | (Ghana) GHA | Jude Arthur | 24 | 1 | 14+6 | 1 | 4 | 0 |
| 9 | FW | (Brazil) BRA | Matheus Batista | 18 | 2 | 8+10 | 2 | 0 | 0 |
| 10 | FW | (England) ENG | Billy Ions | 8 | 0 | 6+2 | 0 | 0 | 0 |
| 11 | FW | (Ukraine) UKR | Denys Oliynyk | 30 | 10 | 24+1 | 8 | 4+1 | 2 |
| 14 | MF | (Finland) FIN | Maximo Tolonen | 21 | 1 | 4+12 | 1 | 1+4 | 0 |
| 15 | DF | (Estonia) EST | Trevor Elhi | 16 | 0 | 14+2 | 0 | 0 | 0 |
| 16 | DF | (Finland) FIN | Joonas Sundman | 20 | 0 | 14+2 | 0 | 4 | 0 |
| 17 | DF | (Finland) FIN | Ville Tikkanen | 10 | 0 | 6+1 | 0 | 1+2 | 0 |
| 18 | DF | (Finland) FIN | Jarkko Hurme | 8 | 0 | 7+1 | 0 | 0 | 0 |
| 19 | MF | (Finland) FIN | Obed Malolo | 18 | 0 | 11+4 | 0 | 2+1 | 0 |
| 20 | FW | (Finland) FIN | Joonas Lepistö | 2 | 0 | 2 | 0 | 0 | 0 |
| 23 | DF | (Ivory Coast) CIV | Didier Kadio | 21 | 1 | 16 | 0 | 5 | 1 |
| 24 | FW | (Finland) FIN | Jyri Kiuru | 5 | 0 | 4+1 | 0 | 0 | 0 |
| 25 | MF | (Finland) FIN | Daniel Håkans | 6 | 0 | 0+2 | 0 | 3+1 | 0 |
| 26 | MF | (Finland) FIN | Jesse Sarajärvi | 23 | 0 | 11+7 | 0 | 4+1 | 0 |
| 27 | MF | (Finland) FIN | Joona Lautamaja | 9 | 1 | 2+3 | 0 | 1+3 | 1 |
| 29 | FW | (Finland) FIN | Jeremiah Streng | 22 | 3 | 10+7 | 0 | 4+1 | 3 |
| 30 | DF | (Brazil) BRA | Nadson | 18 | 1 | 18 | 1 | 0 | 0 |
| 33 | GK | (Estonia) EST | Mihkel Aksalu | 17 | 0 | 15 | 0 | 2 | 0 |
| 49 | MF | (Georgia (country)) GEO | Zakaria Beglarishvili | 5 | 0 | 2+3 | 0 | 0 | 0 |
| 58 | MF | (Finland) FIN | Mehmet Hetemaj | 26 | 2 | 21+1 | 2 | 4 | 0 |
| 77 | FW | (United States) USA | Dion Acoff | 17 | 0 | 11+4 | 0 | 1+1 | 0 |
U23 Players:
| 21 | FW | (Finland) FIN | Oskar Pihlaja | 3 | 0 | 0 | 0 | 0+3 | 0 |
| | MF | (Finland) FIN | Robbie Malolo | 1 | 0 | 0 | 0 | 0+1 | 0 |
Players away from the club on loan:
Players who left SJK during the season:
| 7 | MF | (Finland) FIN | Moshtagh Yaghoubi | 18 | 1 | 15 | 1 | 1+2 | 0 |
| 8 | MF | (Finland) FIN | Sergei Eremenko | 18 | 0 | 12+2 | 0 | 2+2 | 0 |
| 28 | FW | (Finland) FIN | Serge Atakayi | 10 | 1 | 8+2 | 1 | 0 | 0 |

=== Goal scorers ===
| Place | Position | Nation | Number | Name | Veikkausliiga | Finnish Cup | Total |
|---|---|---|---|---|---|---|---|
| 1 | FW | (Ukraine) | 11 | Denys Oliynyk | 8 | 2 | 10 |
| 2 | FW | (Finland) | 9 | Jeremiah Streng | 0 | 3 | 3 |
| 3 | MF | (Finland) | 58 | Mehmet Hetemaj | 2 | 0 | 2 |
| 3 | FW | (Brazil) | 9 | Matheus Batista | 2 | 0 | 2 |
| 5 | DF | (Brazil) | 30 | Nadson | 1 | 0 | 1 |
| 5 | MF | (Finland) | 7 | Moshtagh Yaghoubi | 1 | 0 | 1 |
| 5 | FW | (Finland) | 28 | Serge Atakayi | 1 | 0 | 1 |
| 5 | DF | (Finland) | 5 | Dani Hatakka | 1 | 0 | 1 |
| 5 | MF | (Ghana) | 6 | Jude Arthur | 1 | 0 | 1 |
| 5 | MF | (Finland) | 14 | Maximo Tolonen | 1 | 0 | 1 |
| 5 | DF | (Ivory Coast) | 23 | Didier Kadio | 0 | 1 | 1 |
| 5 | MF | (Finland) | 27 | Joona Lautamaja | 0 | 1 | 1 |
| TOTALS | | | | | 18 | 7 | 25 |

=== Clean sheets ===
| Place | Position | Nation | Number | Name | Veikkausliiga | Finnish Cup | Total |
|---|---|---|---|---|---|---|---|
| 1 | GK | (Estonia) | 33 | Mihkel Aksalu | 4 | 0 | 4 |
| 1 | GK | (Finland) | 1 | Jesse Öst | 4 | 0 | 4 |
| TOTALS | | | | | 8 | 0 | 8 |

=== Disciplinary record ===
| Number | Nation | Position | Name | Veikkausliiga | | Finnish Cup | | Total | |
| Number | Nation | Position | Name | Booked | Sent off (straight red) | Booked | Sent off (straight red) | Booked | Sent off (straight red) |
| 2 | (Finland) | DF | Joel Mero | 1 | 0 | 2 | 0 | 3 | 0 |
| 3 | (Senegal) | DF | Seynabou Benga | 1 | 0 | 0 | 0 | 1 | 0 |
| 5 | (Finland) | DF | Dani Hatakka | 6 | 1 | 1 | 0 | 7 | 1 |
| 6 | (Ghana) | MF | Jude Arthur | 9 | 0 | 3 | 0 | 12 | 0 |
| 11 | (Ukraine) | FW | Denys Oliynyk | 7 | 1 | 3 | 0 | 10 | 1 |
| 15 | (Estonia) | DF | Trevor Elhi | 5 | 0 | 0 | 0 | 5 | 0 |
| 16 | (Finland) | DF | Joonas Sundman | 5 | 0 | 1 | 0 | 6 | 0 |
| 18 | (Finland) | DF | Jarkko Hurme | 2 | 0 | 0 | 0 | 2 | 0 |
| 19 | (Finland) | MF | Obed Malolo | 3 | 1 | 3 | 1 | 6 | 2 |
| 23 | (Ivory Coast) | DF | Didier Kadio | 3 | 1 | 0 | 0 | 3 | 1 |
| 26 | (Finland) | MF | Jesse Sarajärvi | 1 | 0 | 0 | 0 | 1 | 0 |
| 27 | (Finland) | MF | Joona Lautamaja | 1 | 0 | 0 | 0 | 1 | 0 |
| 29 | (Finland) | FW | Jeremiah Streng | 1 | 0 | 1 | 0 | 2 | 0 |
| 30 | (Brazil) | DF | Nadson | 3 | 0 | 0 | 0 | 3 | 0 |
| 58 | (Finland) | MF | Mehmet Hetemaj | 10 | 0 | 0 | 0 | 10 | 0 |
Players who left SJK during the season:
| 7 | (Finland) | MF | Moshtagh Yaghoubi | 9 | 0 | 2 | 1 | 11 | 1 |
| 8 | (Finland) | MF | Sergei Eremenko | 1 | 0 | 0 | 0 | 1 | 0 |
| 28 | (Finland) | FW | Serge Atakayi | 2 | 0 | 0 | 0 | 2 | 0 |
| TOTALS | | | | 70 | 4 | 16 | 2 | 86 | 6 |
