= Seynabou Benga =

Senegalese footballer

Samba Benga
Personal information
- Full name: Seynabou Benga Samba
- Date of birth: 24 November 1996 (age 29)
- Place of birth: Dakar, Senegal
- Height: 1.91 m (6 ft 3 in)
- Position: Defender

Team information
- Current team: TPS
- Number: 21

Senior career*
| Years | Team | Apps | (Gls) |
| 2015–2016 | Pisa | 3 | (0) |
| 2015–2016 | → RapalloBogliasco (loan) | 32 | (1) |
| 2016 | Ponsacco | 8 | (0) |
| 2016–2017 | Ghivizzano Borgo a Mozzano | 16 | (0) |
| 2017–2018 | Sestri Levante | 29 | (0) |
| 2018–2019 | UTA Arad | 19 | (1) |
| 2019 | Ekenäs IF | 11 | (2) |
| 2019–2020 | SJK | 2 | (0) |
| 2019–2020 | SJK II | 6 | (0) |
| 2021–2023 | TPS | 60 | (2) |
| 2024 | Ilves | 0 | (0) |
| 2025– | TPS | 1 | (0) |
- * Club domestic league appearances and goals as of 23 November 2025

Seynabou Benga Samba (born 24 November 1996) is a Senegalese footballer who plays as a defender for TPS.

== Career ==
=== Club ===
On 6 July 2019, Benga signed for Seinäjoen Jalkapallokerho from Ekenäs IF. He left the club on 13 November 2020.

On 26 May 2024, Benga signed with Ilves in Veikkausliiga. Two months later he left the club.

== Career statistics ==
=== Club ===
As of match played 16 June 2024.

| Club | Season | League | | | Cup | | Other | | Total | |
| Club | Season | Division | Apps | Goals | Apps | Goals | Apps | Goals | Apps | Goals |
|---|---|---|---|---|---|---|---|---|---|---|
| Pisa | 2014–15 | Lega Pro | 3 | 0 | 0 | 0 | – | | 3 | 0 |
| RapalloBogliasco (loan) | 2015–16 | Serie D | 32 | 1 | – | | – | | 32 | 1 |
| Ponsacco | 2016–17 | Serie D | 8 | 0 | – | | – | | 8 | 0 |
| Ghivizzano Borgo a Mozzano | 2016–17 | Serie D | 16 | 0 | – | | – | | 16 | 0 |
| Sestri Levante | 2017–18 | Serie D | 25 | 0 | – | | 4 (Note: Includes Coppa Italia Serie D) | 0 | 29 | 0 |
| UTA Arad | 2018–19 | Liga II | 19 | 1 | – | | – | | 19 | 1 |
| Ekenäs IF | 2019 | Ykkönen | 11 | 2 | 0 | 0 | – | | 11 | 2 |
| SJK | 2019 | Veikkausliiga | 2 | 0 | 0 | 0 | – | | 2 | 0 |
| SJK | 2020 | Veikkausliiga | 0 | 0 | 3 | 0 | – | | 3 | 0 |
| SJK | Total | | 2 | 0 | 3 | 0 | – | – | 5 | 0 |
| SJK Akatemia | 2019 | Kakkonen | 5 | 0 | – | | – | | 5 | 0 |
| SJK Akatemia | 2020 | Ykkönen | 1 | 0 | – | | – | | 1 | 0 |
| SJK Akatemia | Total | | 6 | 0 | 0 | 0 | – | – | 6 | 0 |
| TPS | 2021 | Ykkönen | 19 | 0 | 3 | 1 | – | | 22 | 1 |
| TPS | 2022 | Ykkönen | 24 | 0 | 1 | 0 | 6 (Note: Includes Ykköscup) | 0 | 31 | 0 |
| TPS | 2023 | Ykkönen | 19 | 2 | 0 | 0 | 0 | 0 | 19 | 2 |
| TPS | Total | | 62 | 2 | 4 | 1 | 6 | 0 | 72 | 3 |
| Ilves | 2024 | Veikkausliiga | 0 | 0 | 1 | 0 | 0 | 0 | 1 | 0 |
| Ilves II | 2024 | Kakkonen | 2 | 1 | – | | – | | 2 | 1 |
| Career total | | | 186 | 7 | 8 | 1 | 10 | 0 | 204 | 8 |
