= Aniis Machaal =

Finnish footballer (born 2007)

Personal information
- Date of birth: 2 May 2007 (age 19)
- Place of birth: Finland
- Position: Midfielder

Team information
- Current team: SJK
- Number: 33

Youth career
- –2022: VPS
- 2023: SJK

Senior career*
Years	Team	Apps	(Gls)
2023–2024	SJK Akatemia II	36	(5)
2023–	SJK Akatemia	25	(1)
2025–	SJK	5	(0)

International career^{‡}
2022	Finland U16	2	(0)
2024	Finland U18	2	(0)
2025–	Finland U19	1	(1)
- * Club domestic league appearances and goals as of 1 November 2026 ‡ National team caps and goals as of 6 September 2025

Aniis Machaal (born 2 May 2007) is a Finnish professional footballer who plays as a midfielder for Veikkausliiga club SJK Seinäjoki.

== Personal life ==
His brother Elias is also a footballer.
