= Mikko Kujala =

Finnish football coach (born 1977)

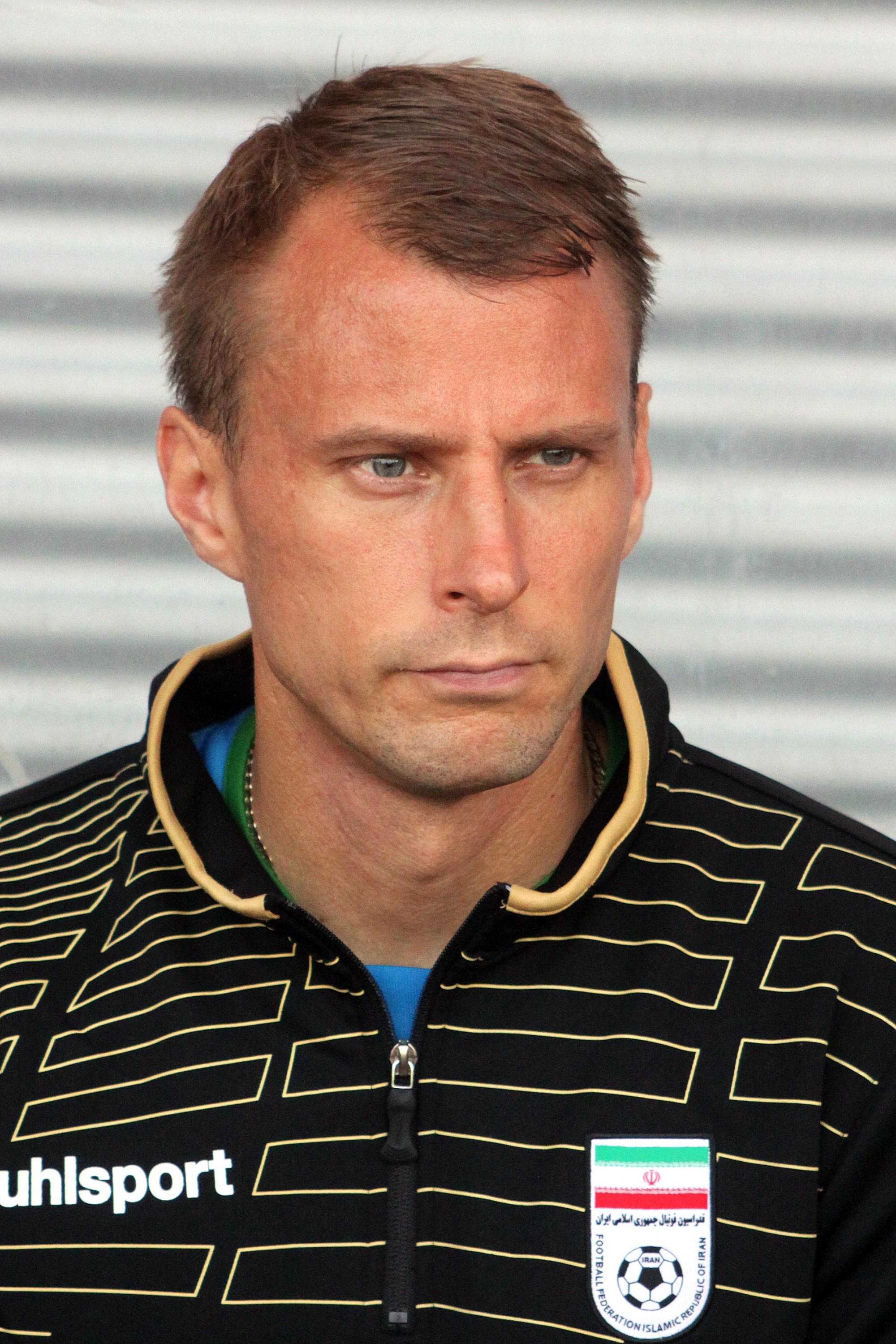
- Kujala with the Iran national team in 2014

Personal information
- Full name: Mikko Ilmari Kujala
- Date of birth: 6 September 1977 (age 49)
- Place of birth: Tampere, Finland
- Height: 1.79 m (5 ft 10 in)
- Position: Right back

Team information
- Current team: SJK II (conditioning coach)

Youth career
- 1988–1997: Ilves

Senior career*
Years	Team	Apps	(Gls)
1998–2000	PP-70	31	(0)
2001	Sorsapuiston Ilves	9	(0)

Managerial career
- 2005–2009: Tampere United (assistant)
- 2013–2018: Iran (fitness coach)
- 2019–2020: SJK (conditioning coach)
- * Club domestic league appearances and goals

Mikko Kujala (born 6 September 1977) is a Finnish football coach and a former footballer who played as a defender. He is currently working as a conditioning coach in the SJK Seinäjoki organisation. Previously he worked as fitness coach for the Iran national team during 2013–2018, and also during the 2022 FIFA World Cup tournament.

Kujala has studied sport sciences at the University of Liverpool and Liverpool John Moores University. In 2008, he completed the fitness coach degree of the English FA.

== Personal life ==
His younger brother Jussi is a former professional footballer.
