= Jussi Kujala (footballer) =

Finnish footballer (born 1983)

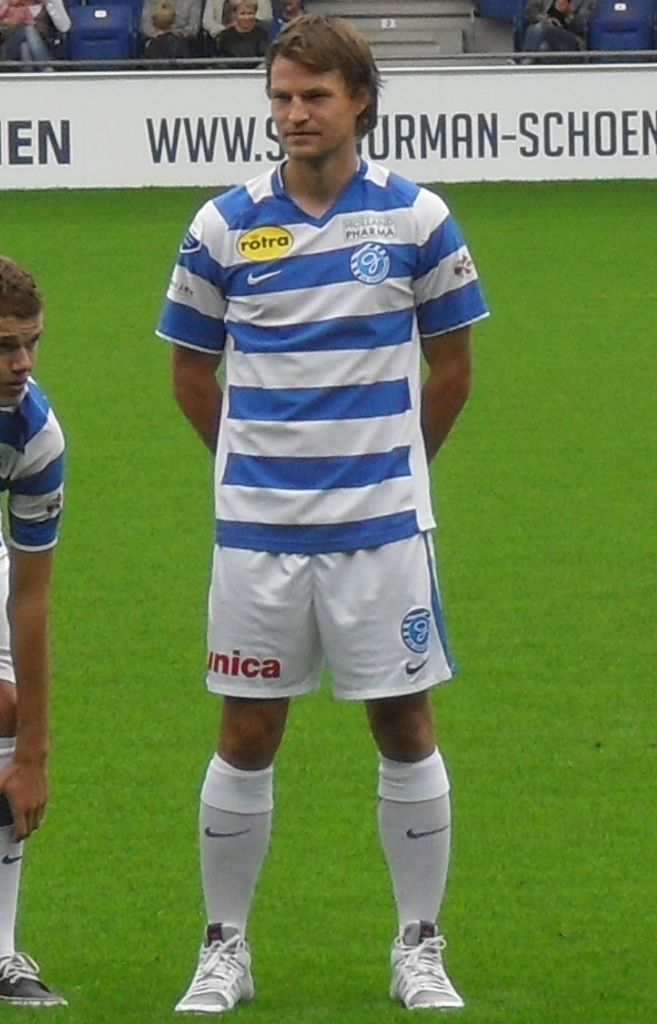
- Kujala with De Graafschap in 2011

Personal information
- Date of birth: 4 April 1983 (age 43)
- Place of birth: Tampere, Finland
- Height: 1.83 m (6 ft 0 in)
- Positions: Midfielder; defender

Youth career
- 1992–1999: Ilves

Senior career*
Years	Team	Apps	(Gls)
1999–2000	Tampere United	10	(1)
2000–2004	Ajax	0	(0)
2004–2009	Tampere United	119	(8)
2009	TPS	6	(1)
2010–2012	De Graafschap	40	(1)
2012	Ilves	6	(2)
2013–2014	KuPS	29	(0)
2015	Ilves	29	(1)
Total		239	(12)

International career
- Finland U21
2004–2009	Finland	5	(0)
Medal record
Tampere United
Third place	Veikkausliiga	2004
Third place	Veikkausliiga	2005
Winner	Veikkausliiga	2006
Winner	Veikkausliiga	2007
Winner	Finnish Cup	2007
Winner	Finnish League Cup	2009
TPS
Third place	Veikkausliiga	2009
De Graafschap
Winner	Eerste Divisie	2010
- * Club domestic league appearances and goals

Jussi Kujala (born 4 April 1983 in Tampere) is a Finnish former footballer. Having started his career as an attacking midfielder, he has since dropped deeper down the field. He was the captain of the Finnish U21 national team in the 2006 UEFA European Under-21 Football Championship qualifiers.

== Club career ==
Kujala made his debut for United in 2000; he made ten appearances and scored one goal for the team.

After Tampere United, he spent four seasons playing in the junior and reserve teams of Ajax.

He returned to Tampere United in 2004. As the club had financial difficulties, in 2009 he was allowed to leave the team.

He transferred to Turku during the summer 2009 transfer window.

In January 2010, he left Turku, and signed with Dutch side De Graafschap on a free transfer.

In September 2012, Kujala signed a contract with his old junior team Ilves. Ilves was promoted to Ykkönen at the end of the season.

On 27 November, KuPS announced that they had signed Kujala for two years.

In January 2015, he signed a one-year contract with Ilves.

He announced his retirement in December 2015.

== International career ==
Kujala made his international debut in Finland's national team in 2004 against Oman.

== Personal life ==
His brother Mikko is a football coach.

== Career statistics ==
=== Club ===
As of 1 September 2024.

Appearances and goals by club, season and competition
Club	Season	League			Cup (Note: Includes Suomen Cup)		League cup		Europe		Total	
Club	Season	Division	Apps	Goals	Apps	Goals	Apps	Goals	Apps	Goals	Apps	Goals
Tampere United	1999	Ykkönen	3	0	–		–		–		3	0
Tampere United	2000	Veikkausliiga	7	1	–		–		–		7	1
Tampere United	Total		10	1	0	0	0	0	0	0	10	1
Ajax	2001–02	Eredivisie	0	0	0	0	–		0	0	0	0
Ajax	2002–03	Eredivisie	0	0	0	0	–		0	0	0	0
Tampere United	2004	Veikkausliiga	8	0	–		–		–		8	0
Tampere United	2005	Veikkausliiga	23	5	–		–		6 (Note: Appearances in UEFA Intertoto Cup)	0	29	5
Tampere United	2006	Veikkausliiga	19	0	1	1	–		2	0	22	1
Tampere United	2007	Veikkausliiga	25	1	1	0	–		8 (Note: Appearances in UEFA Champions League and UEFA Cup)	0	34	1
Tampere United	2008	Veikkausliiga	25	0	1	0	–		4 (Note: Appearances in UEFA Champions League)	0	30	0
Tampere United	2009	Veikkausliiga	19	2	1	0	9	0	–		29	2
Tampere United	Total		119	8	4	1	9	0	20	0	152	9
TPS	2009	Veikkausliiga	6	1	–		–		–		6	1
De Graafschap	2009–10	Eerste Divisie	10	0	–		–		–		10	0
De Graafschap	2010–11	Eredivisie	17	0	1	0	–		–		18	0
De Graafschap	2011–12	Eredivisie	13	1	2	1	–		–		15	2
De Graafschap	Total		40	1	3	1	0	0	0	0	43	2
Ilves	2012	Kakkonen	6	2	–		–		–		6	2
KuPS	2013	Veikkausliiga	23	0	2	0	8	1	–		33	1
KuPS	2014	Veikkausliiga	6	0	–		–		–		6	0
KuPS	Total		29	0	2	0	8	1	0	0	39	1
Ilves	2015	Veikkausliiga	30	1	1	0	6	0	–		37	1
Career total			240	14	10	2	23	1	20	0	293	17

=== International ===
As of 26 March 2013

Finland national team
Year	Apps	Goals
2004	1	0
2005	0	0
2006	2	0
2007	0	0
2008	1	0
2009	1	0
Total	5	0

== Honours ==
De Graafschap

- Eerste Divisie: 2009–10

Tampere United

- Veikkausliiga (2): 2006, 2007
- Finnish Cup: 2007
- Finnish League Cup: 2009

De Graafschap

- Eerste Divisie: 2009–10

Ilves

- Kakkonen: 2012
