= Arttu Aromaa =

Finnish football manager (born 1995)

Personal information
- Date of birth: 5 January 1995 (age 31)
- Place of birth: Jalasjärvi, Finland
- Height: 1.88 m (6 ft 2 in)
- Position: Midfielder

Team information
- Current team: SJK II (manager)

Youth career
- Jalasjärven Jalas
- TP-Seinäjoki
- –2014: SJK

Senior career*
Years	Team	Apps	(Gls)
2014–2020	SJK II	104	(1)
2016–2020	SJK	0	(0)
2016	→ SalPa (loan)	6	(0)
2017	→ Jazz (loan)	7	(0)
2018	→ AC Kajaani (loan)	0	(0)

Managerial career
- 2015–2022: SJK (youth)
- 2023: SJK II (assistant)
- 2024–: SJK II
- * Club domestic league appearances and goals as of 17 March 2024

Arttu Aromaa (born 5 January 1995) is a Finnish football manager and a former player who played as a defensive midfielder. He is currently working as a manager of Ykkösliiga club SJK Akatemia (SJK II).
