= Alexei Eremenko =

Russian-Finnish footballer (born 1983)

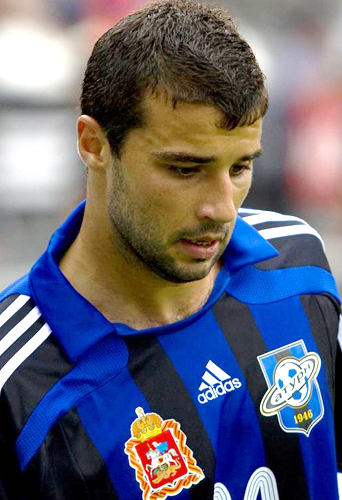
- Eremenko playing for Saturn Moscow in 2009

Personal information
- Full name: Aleksei Alekseyevich Yeryomenko
- Date of birth: 24 March 1983 (age 43)
- Place of birth: Rostov-on-Don, Soviet Union
- Height: 1.83 m (6 ft 0 in)
- Position: Attacking midfielder

Youth career
- 1990–1997: Jaro
- 1998: Tromsø
- 1999: HJK
- 2000–2001: Metz

Senior career*
Years	Team	Apps	(Gls)
2001	Jokerit	15	(2)
2002–2004	HJK	60	(10)
2004–2006	Lecce	35	(0)
2006–2009	Saturn	76	(8)
2009–2011	Metalist Kharkiv	10	(0)
2010	→ Jaro (loan)	16	(7)
2010–2011	→ Kilmarnock (loan)	31	(4)
2011–2012	Rubin Kazan	7	(0)
2013	Kairat Almaty	14	(0)
2013–2015	Kilmarnock	40	(5)
2015	Jaro	11	(0)
2016	SJK	5	(0)
2017	Spartak Helsinki	1	(1)
Total		304	(35)

International career
2003–2013	Finland	57	(14)

Managerial career
- 2018–2022: Spartaks Jūrmala (sporting director)
- * Club domestic league appearances and goals

Alexei Eremenko (born Aleksei Alekseyevich Yeryomenko; Russian: Алексей Алексеевич Ерёменко; born 24 March 1983) is a former professional footballer. He is from a footballing family, with his father, Aleksei Yeryomenko, and brothers Roman Eremenko and Sergei Eremenko also playing professionally.

Eremenko was born in Rostov-on-Don in the Soviet Union, but grew up in Finland. He made his breakthrough with HJK in 2002, and became known as versatile midfielder and a set piece specialist. A mediocre spell with Italian club Lecce followed, before he came to prominence at Russian club Saturn. He moved to Metalist Kharkiv in 2009, but was loaned out twice, especially impressing with Kilmarnock where he was nominated for the 2010–11 Players' Player of the Year award. He returned to the club on a permanent deal in January 2014. After failing to negotiate a contract extension, he played in Finland until retiring from football in 2017.

Eremenko represented Finland between 2003 and 2013, and was a key player for the team in 2006 World Cup qualifying, scoring seven goals, four of which came from free kicks. He ended his international career with 57 caps in which he scored 14 goals.

== Early life ==
Eremenko was born in Rostov-on-Don, Russian SFSR, Soviet Union but moved to Finland with his family at the age of seven when his father, former FC Dynamo Moscow and FC Spartak Moscow player Aleksei Yeryomenko, came to play in Finland with FF Jaro. He was granted Finnish citizenship in 2003, but still holds a Russian passport as well. He is the elder brother of fellow footballers Roman Eremenko and Sergei Eremenko.

Alexei's son, Daniil Eremenko, has been a football player for FC Rubin Kazan since June 22, 2026.

== Club career ==
Eremenko spent some time with Tromsø IL in Norway, where he played for the U15 team while his father played for the senior team. He then joined the youth academy of FC Metz in France, before returning to Finland to make his Veikkausliiga debut with FC Jokerit in 2001. A trial with Aston Villa followed, but he ended up joining HJK in 2002.

There, Eremenko played alongside his father, who helped their side win two Finnish championships (2002 and 2003) and one Finnish Cup, thus becoming the first-ever father-son duo in the history of football to win a title in the top tier.

=== Lecce and Saturn ===
In the summer of 2004, Eremenko moved abroad, joining Italian Serie A club U.S. Lecce for €250,000. He made 38 appearances with Lecce in all competitions, but after failing to make a major breakthrough at Lecce, he moved to Russian Premier League club FC Leon Saturn Ramenskoye on a four-year deal in January 2006 transfer window for a transfer fee of €1.5 million, becoming a key player for the Russian side.

=== Metalist Kharkiv ===
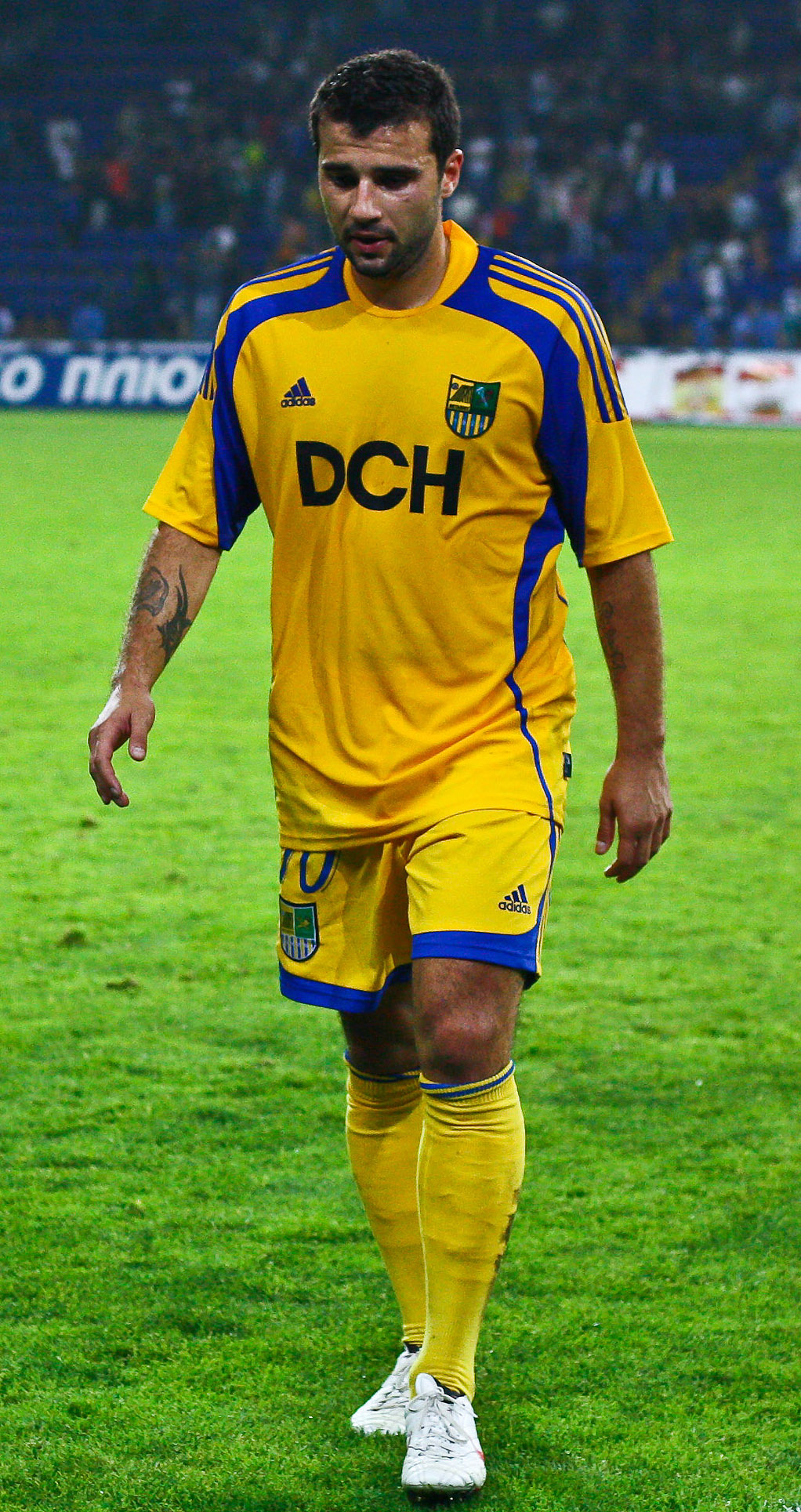
Eremenko with Metalist Kharkiv in 2009

On 29 July 2009, Eremenko signed a three-year contract with the Ukrainian Premier League club FC Metalist Kharkiv, and scored his first goal in his debut game against HNK Rijeka.

==== Jaro (loan) ====
On 12 March 2010, it was announced that Eremenko had been traded back to his first club, FF Jaro, for the 2010 season (his father was the club's manager at the time). He managed to score on his debut, in a Finnish League Cup game against JJK on 20 March 2010. He also continued scoring in Veikkausliiga's opening match against FC Lahti, scoring on a rebound after his unsuccessful penalty kick.

==== Kilmarnock (loan) ====
On 30 August 2010, it was announced that Eremenko had been loaned to Mixu Paatelainen's Kilmarnock until the end of the season. He scored on his debut in a 2–1 victory over St Mirren. On 5 March 2011, Eremenko was given his second straight red card of the season against Hearts at Tynecastle after an off the ball altercation with the opposition captain Marius Zaliukas. On 11 April, Eremenko stated that he wanted to end his career at Rugby Park. Eremenko was nominated for the 2010–11 Players' Player of the Year award, losing out to Celtic's Emilio Izaguirre.

After returning from his loan spell, Metalist Kharkiv told him he could leave, where he then stated that he had received bids from an English Championship club and a Russian club, with reports that Scottish Old Firm duo Celtic and Rangers were interested in signing him. The Championship club was later reported to be the Welsh club Cardiff City. Brighton & Hove Albion, a fellow Championship club, were also believed to be interested in signing him. On 15 July 2011, it was reported in a Finnish newspaper that Eremenko was signing for Leeds United, but the transfer was delayed due to a cancelled flight, which prevented him from linking up with the squad in Scotland.

=== Rubin Kazan ===
On 30 August 2011, Eremenko signed a contract with Russian club Rubin Kazan alongside his younger brother Roman, for a fee of €500,000.

=== Kairat Almaty ===
In June 2013, Kazakhstan Premier League club Kairat Almaty signed Eremenko for a €200,000 fee from Rubin Kazan. He terminated his contract with Kairat on 26 November 2013.

=== Return to Kilmarnock ===
On 28 January 2014, it was announced that Eremenko had re-joined Kilmarnock until the end of the 2013–14 season. On 7 August 2014, he signed a new contract at Kilmarnock, keeping him at the club for the 2014–15 season. At the end of that season, Eremenko left the club after failing to agree to the terms on a new contract.

=== Return to Jaro ===
On 7 August 2015, Eremenko signed again for FF Jaro, agreeing to a contract until the end of the 2015 Veikkausliiga season, with the contract also containing a clause allowing him to move abroad should he receive a suitable offer.

=== SJK ===
On 26 January 2016, Eremenko moved to SJK. After just over three months, Eremenko left SJK on 4 May 2016 for personal reasons.

== International career ==
Eremenko made his debut for the Finnish national team on 11 October 2003 against Canada. He was a key player for Finland in 2006 World Cup qualifying, scoring seven goals, four of which came from free kicks. He shared the third position among the top scorers in the group, along with Adrian Mutu, but behind Jan Koller and Ruud van Nistelrooy who both scored nine goals.

== Career statistics ==
=== Club ===
As of 31 December 2020

Appearances and goals by club, season and competition
Club	Season	League			National cup (Note: Includes Suomen Cup, Coppa Italia, Russian Cup, Ukrainian Cup and Scottish Cup)		Other		Continental		Total	
Club	Season	Division	Apps	Goals	Apps	Goals	Apps	Goals	Apps	Goals	Apps	Goals
Jokerit	2001	Veikkausliiga	15	2	0	0	0	0	2 (Note: Includes UEFA Cup)	0	17	2
HJK	2002	Veikkausliiga	27	2	0	0	0	0	2	0	29	2
HJK	2003	Veikkausliiga	19	4	1	0	0	0	2 (Note: Includes UEFA Champions League)	0	22	4
HJK	2004	Veikkausliiga	14	4	0	0	0	0	2	0	16	4
HJK	Total		60	10	1	0	0	0	6	0	67	10
Lecce	2004–05	Serie A	27	0	2	0	–		–		29	0
Lecce	2005–06	Serie A	8	0	1	0	–		–		9	0
Lecce	Total		35	0	3	0	0	0	0	0	38	0
Saturn	2006	Russian Premier League	28	7	6	1	–		–		34	8
Saturn	2007	Russian Premier League	22	1	3	1	–		–		25	2
Saturn	2008	Russian Premier League	19	0	2	1	–		–		21	1
Saturn	2009	Russian Premier League	7	0	1	0	–		3 (Note: Includes UEFA Intertoto Cup)	0	11	0
Saturn	Total		76	8	12	3	0	0	3	0	91	11
Metalist Kharkiv	2009–10	Ukrainian Premier League	10	0	1	0	–		4 (Note: Includes UEFA Europa League)	1	15	1
Metalist Kharkiv	2010–11	Ukrainian Premier League	0	0	0	0	–		–		0	0
Metalist Kharkiv	Total		10	0	1	0	0	0	4	1	15	1
Jaro (loan)	2010	Veikkausliiga	16	7	–		–		–		16	7
Kilmarnock (loan)	2010–11	Scottish Premier League	31	4	1	0	2 (Note: Includes Scottish League Cup)	0	–		34	4
Rubin Kazan	2011–12	Russian Premier League	4	0	1	0	–		2	0	6	0
Rubin Kazan	2012–13	Russian Premier League	3	0	1	0	0	0	1	0	5	0
Rubin Kazan	Total		7	0	2	0	0	0	3	0	12	0
Kairat Almaty	2013	Kazakhstan Premier League	14	0	–		–		–		14	0
Kilmarnock	2013–14	Scottish Premiership	13	1	–		–		–		13	1
Kilmarnock	2014–15	Scottish Premiership	27	4	1	0	2	0	–		30	4
Kilmarnock	Total		40	11	1	0	5	2	4	1	62	14
Jaro	2015	Veikkausliiga	11	0	–		–		–		11	0
SJK	2016	Veikkausliiga	5	0	2	0	5 (Note: Includes Finnish League Cup)	0	–		12	0
Career total			320	36	23	3	9	0	18	1	370	40

=== International ===
As of 17 June 2013

Appearances and goals by national team and year
National team	Year	Apps	Goals
Finland	2003	3	0
Finland	2004	10	7
Finland	2005	8	3
Finland	2006	5	0
Finland	2007	8	2
Finland	2008	2	0
Finland	2009	8	1
Finland	2010	5	0
Finland	2011	5	1
Finland	2012	3	0
Finland	2013	1	0
Finland	Total	57	14

=== International goals ===
As of 15 November 2011.

Win Draw Loss

Alexei Eremenko Jr. international goals
No.	Date	Home team	Visiting team	Goals	Score	Result	Venue	Competition	Report/Note
1.	3 February 2004	China	Finland	51' 1–1	2–1	Loss	Guangzhou, China	Friendly	
2.	31 March 2004	Malta	Finland	51' 0–1	1–2	Win	Ta'Qali, Malta	Friendly	
3.	18 August 2004	Romania	Finland	90+3' 2–1	2–1	Loss	Stadionul Giuleşti-Valentin Stănescu, Bukarest	2006 FIFA World Cup qualif.	Report
4. 5.	4 September 2004	Finland	Andorra	42' 64'; 1–0, 2–0	3–0	Win	Ratina Stadion, Tampere, Finland	2006 FIFA World Cup qualif.	Report
6.	8 September 2004	Armenia	Finland	67' 0–2	0–2	Win	Republican Stadium, Jerevan, Armenia	2006 FIFA World Cup qualif.	Report
7.	9 October 2004	Finland	Armenia	67' 2–0	3–1	Win	Ratina Stadion, Tampere, Finland	2006 FIFA World Cup qualif.	Report
8. 9.	17 August 2005	Macedonia	Finland	8' 45'; 0–1, 0–2	0–3	Win	Philip II of Macedon National Stadium, Skopje	2006 FIFA World Cup qualif.	Report
10.	7 September 2005	Finland	Macedonia	54' 4–1	5–1	Win	Ratina Stadion, Tampere, Finland	2006 FIFA World Cup qualif.	Report
11.	6 June 2007	Finland	Belgium	71' 2–0	2–0	Win	Olympic Stadium, Helsinki, Finland	UEFA Euro 2008 qualifying	Report
12.	22 August 2007	Finland	Kazakhstan	13' 1–0	2–1	Win	Ratina Stadion, Tampere, Finland	UEFA Euro 2008 qualifying	Report
13.	1 April 2009	Norway	Finland	90' 2–2	3–2	Loss	Oslo, Norway	Friendly	
14.	15 November 2011	Denmark	Finland	18' 0–1	2–1	Loss	Blue Water Arena, Esbjerg	Friendly	

== Honours ==
=== Club ===
HJK Helsinki

- Veikkausliiga: 2002, 2003
- Finnish Cup: 2003

Rubin Kazan

- Russian Cup: 2011–12
- Russian Super Cup: 2012

=== Individual ===
- Veikkausliiga Top assist provider: 2010
- Scottish Premier League Player of the Month: November 2010
