= Prosper Padera =

Zimbabwean footballer (born 2006)

Personal information
- Date of birth: 9 October 2006 (age 20)
- Place of birth: Mutare, Zimbabwe
- Height: 1.70 m (5 ft 7 in)
- Position: Defensive midfielder

Team information
- Current team: SJK
- Number: 30

Youth career
- Prime Time Academy

College career
| Years | Team | Apps | (Gls) |
- Brooke House College

Senior career*
| Years | Team | Apps | (Gls) |
| 2025– | SJK | 16 | (0) |
| 2025– | SJK II | 16 | (0) |

International career^{‡}
| 2025– | Zimbabwe | 4 | (0) |
- * Club domestic league appearances and goals as of 1 November 2026 ‡ National team caps and goals as of 27 September 2025

Prosper Padera (born 9 October 2006) is a Zimbabwean professional footballer who plays as defensive midfielder for Veikkausliiga club SJK Seinäjoki and the Zimbabwe national team.

== Career ==
Padera played for Mutare-based Majesa Academy and Harare-based Prime Time Academy in his native Zimbabwe, before joining Brooke House College in the United Kingdom on a scholarship in 2023. He also trialed for Brentford.

In December 2024, Padera moved to Finland and signed with Veikkausliiga club SJK Seinäjoki on a four-year deal. He made his debut in Veikkausliiga on 2 May against KuPS.

== International career ==
On 11 December 2025, Padera was called up to the Zimbabwe squad for the 2025 Africa Cup of Nations.

== Career statistics ==
=== International ===
As of match played 9 September 2025

Appearances and goals by national team and year
| National team | Year | Apps | Goals |
|---|---|---|---|
| Zimbabwe | 2025 | 4 | 0 |
| Total | | 4 | 0 |
