= Joonas Sundman =

Finnish footballer (born 1998)

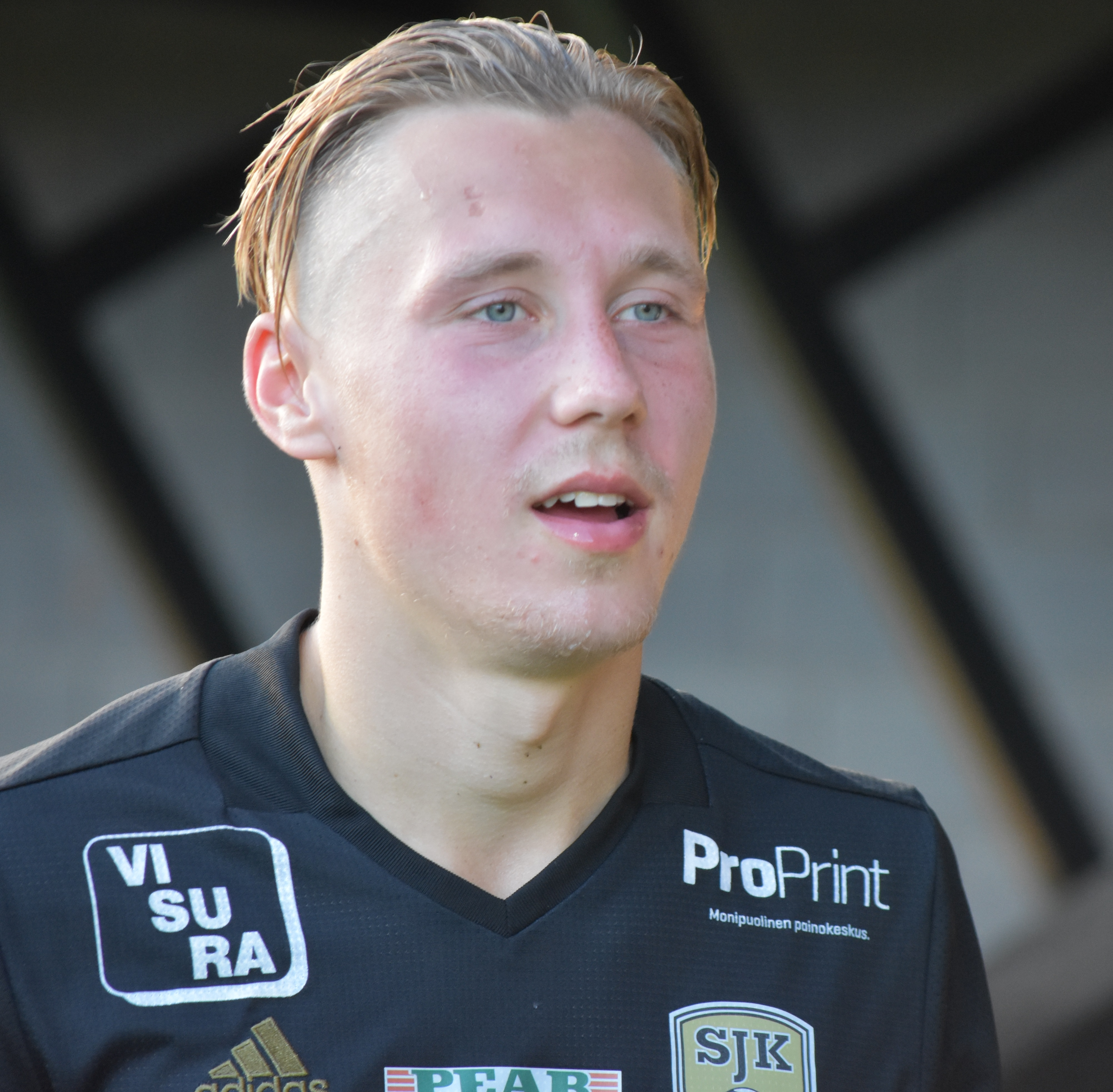
- Sundman with SJK in 2018.

Personal information
- Full name: Joonas Sebastian Sundman
- Date of birth: 20 January 1998 (age 28)
- Place of birth: Seinäjoki, Finland
- Height: 1.89 m (6 ft 2 1/2 in)
- Position: Defender

Team information
- Current team: Honka
- Number: 15

Youth career
- –2011: TP-Seinäjoki
- 2012–2014: SJK
- 2014–2017: Aston Villa

Senior career*
Years	Team	Apps	(Gls)
2017–2021	SJK	56	(0)
2017–2021	SJK II	12	(2)
2021	→ TPS (loan)	13	(0)
2022–2023	TPS	27	(0)
2024–2026	PK-35	27	(0)
2026–	Honka	19	(2)

International career^{‡}
2014	Finland U17		
2017–2019	Finland U21	10	(0)
- * Club domestic league appearances and goals as of 8 November 2026 ‡ National team caps and goals as of 14 November 2019

Joonas Sebastian Sundman (born 20 January 1998) is a Finnish professional footballer who plays for Kakkonen club Honka, as a defender.

== Club career ==
On 21 February 2022, Sundman signed a contract for the 2022 season with TPS.
