= Matheus Batista =

Brazilian footballer

Personal information
- Full name: Matheus dos Santos Batista
- Date of birth: 16 June 1995 (age 31)
- Place of birth: Americana, Brazil
- Height: 1.78 m (5 ft 10 in)
- Position: Forward

Team information
- Current team: Taubaté

Youth career
- Novorizontino
- 2014: Grêmio

Senior career*
Years	Team	Apps	(Gls)
2013	Novorizontino	2	(1)
2015–2017	Grêmio	13	(2)
2017	→ Tondela (loan)	4	(0)
2018–2020	Atlético Tubarão	0	(0)
2019	→ SJK (loan)	18	(2)
2019	→ SJK Akatemia (loan)	2	(0)
2020–2021	Novorizontino	11	(1)
2021	→ Marcílio Dias (loan)	4	(0)
2021	Esportivo	17	(7)
2022	Caxias	27	(7)
2022–2023	Paysandu	0	(0)
2023	Oriku	12	(5)
2023–2024	Ferroviária	23	(8)
2024	Brasiliense	11	(2)
2025	Monsoon	3	(0)
2025–	Taubaté	5	(1)
- * Club domestic league appearances and goals as of 13 April 2025

Matheus dos Santos Batista (born 16 June 1995) is a Brazilian footballer who plays for Taubaté.

== Career ==
On 14 January 2022, he signed with Caxias.
