= Jude Arthur =

Ghanaian footballer

Personal information
- Full name: Jude Ekow Arthur
- Date of birth: 8 June 1999 (age 27)
- Place of birth: Ghana
- Height: 1.90 m (6 ft 3 in)
- Position: Defensive midfielder

Team information
- Current team: Sha Tin
- Number: 30

Youth career
- Liberty Professionals

Senior career*
Years	Team	Apps	(Gls)
2018–2019	Liberty Professionals	10	(0)
2019	→ SJK (loan)	22	(1)
2020–2022	SJK	33	(0)
2020–2022	SJK II	11	(0)
2022	→ Haka (loan)	11	(2)
2023	Samgurali Tsqaltubo	32	(0)
2024	Chattanooga	19	(0)
2025	Samgurali Tsqaltubo	15	(0)
2025	Gareji Sagarejo	12	(0)
2026–	Sha Tin	6	(1)
- * Club domestic league appearances and goals as of 31 October 2026

Jude Ekow Arthur (born 8 June 1999) is a Ghanaian professional footballer who currently plays as a defensive midfielder for Hong Kong Premier League club Sha Tin.

== Club career ==
Arthur departed Chattanooga in January 2025 by mutual consent.

On 8 August 2026, Arthur joined Hong Kong Premier League club Sha Tin.

== Career statistics ==
=== Club ===
As of 28 January 2025

Club	Season	League			Cup (Note: Includes Suomen Cup and Georgian Cup)		Europe		Other		Total	
Club	Season	Division	Apps	Goals	Apps	Goals	Apps	Goals	Apps	Goals	Apps	Goals
Liberty Professionals	2018	Ghana Premier League	10	0	–		–		–		10	0
SJK (loan)	2019	Veikkausliiga	21	1	4	0	–		–		25	1
SJK	2020	Veikkausliiga	14	0	5	0	–		–		19	0
SJK	2021	Veikkausliiga	19	0	5	0	–		–		24	0
SJK	2022	Veikkausliiga	0	0	0	0	0	0	2 (Note: Includes Finnish League Cup)	0	2	0
SJK	Total		33	0	10	0	0	0	2	0	45	0
SJK Akatemia	2020	Ykkönen	2	0	–		–		–		2	0
SJK Akatemia	2021	Kakkonen	1	0	–		–		–		1	0
SJK Akatemia	2022	Ykkönen	8	0	0	0	–		1 (Note: Includes Ykköscup)	0	9	0
SJK Akatemia	Total		11	0	0	0	0	0	1	0	12	0
Haka (loan)	2022	Veikkausliiga	11	2	–		–		–		11	2
Samgurali Tsqaltubo	2023	Erovnuli Liga	32	0	3	0	–		–		35	0
Chattanooga	2024	MLS Next Pro	19	0	–		–		–		9	0
Career total			137	3	17	0	0	0	3	0	147	3
