= Roman Eremenko =

Finnish footballer (born 1987)

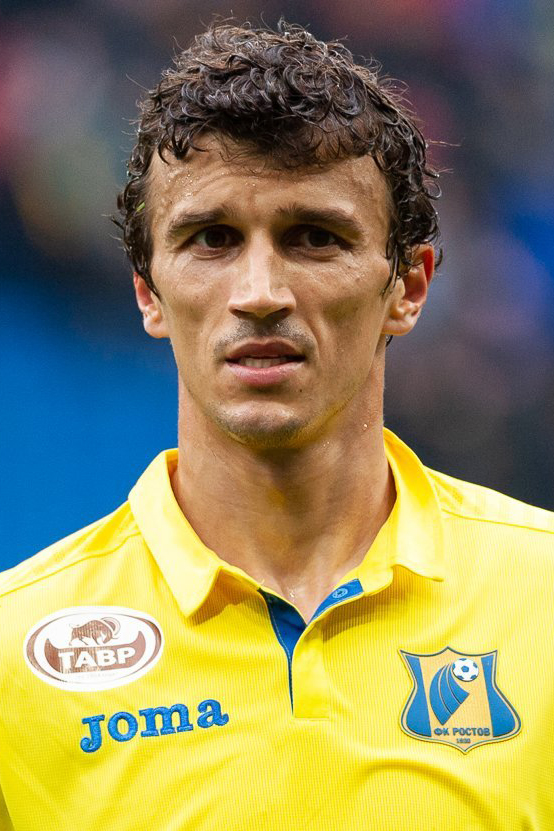

Personal information
- Full name: Roman Alekseyevich Eremenko
- Date of birth: 19 March 1987 (age 39)
- Place of birth: Moscow, Russia
- Height: 1.87 m (6 ft 2 in)
- Position: Attacking midfielder

Team information
- Current team: Gnistan
- Number: 26

Youth career
- 1994–1997: Jaro
- 1998: Tromsø IL
- 1999–2003: HJK
- 2003: Jokerit
- 2003–2004: Jaro

Senior career*
Years	Team	Apps	(Gls)
2003–2005	JBK		
2004–2005	Jaro	19	(3)
2004	→ GBK (loan)	3	(0)
2005–2009	Udinese	13	(0)
2007	→ Siena (loan)	11	(0)
2008–2009	→ Dynamo Kyiv (loan)	19	(1)
2009–2011	Dynamo Kyiv	58	(4)
2011–2014	Rubin Kazan	73	(11)
2014–2017	CSKA Moscow	59	(19)
2018	Spartak Moscow	4	(0)
2019–2021	Rostov	44	(9)
2022	HIFK	11	(2)
2023	Honka	21	(3)
2024–	Gnistan	66	(6)

International career^{‡}
	Finland U17	6	(3)
	Finland U19	5	(0)
2006–2008	Finland U21	5	(0)
2007–	Finland	74	(5)
Medal record
Finland national football team
Third place	Baltic Cup	2014
- * Club domestic league appearances and goals as of 13 November 2026 ‡ National team caps and goals as of 15 November 2026

Roman Alyeksyeyevich Yeryomyenko (Russian: Роман Алексеевич Ерёменко; born 19 March 1987) is a professional footballer who plays as an attacking midfielder for Veikkausliiga club IF Gnistan. Born in Russia, he represents Finland at international level.

Eremenko is best known for his time at Dynamo Kyiv, winning the Ukrainian Premier League title in 2009, and playing in the Champions League and Europa League. He served a two-year ban for cocaine use from October 2016 to October 2018.

Prior to his ban, Eremenko also played regularly for the Finland national team. He made his international debut in June 2007 at the age of 20, having moved to Finland from Russia as a child.

== Early career ==
Eremenko started to play football in a youth sector of FF Jaro in Pietarsaari, Finland, in 1994. He would also play in the youth sectors of Tromsø IL in Norway and HJK Helsinki, while his father Alexei Eremenko Sr. was playing professionally for the first teams, before they returned to Pietarsaari and Jaro in 2003.

== Club career ==
=== Jaro ===
Eremenko's career on senior level started when he made his Veikkausliiga debut for Jaro in 2004 at the age of 17, when head coach Hannu Touru used him as a substitute in a match against MYPA on 29 June 2004. In that match Eremenko appeared on the pitch at the same time with his father, who played for the whole match as a midfielder. Eremenko scored his first goal on senior level on 18 September 2004 in a match against FC Lahti. He made six appearances for Jaro in his first season. During season 2004 he was also loaned to Kakkonen club Jakobstads BK and to Finnish First Division club GBK Kokkola. He made his break through in Jaro during season 2005 when he became a regular in the starting eleven. He gained 13 caps and was in the starting line-up 10 times. In those 13 matches he scored two goals.

=== Udinese ===
In the summer of 2005, Eremenko signed a five-year deal with Udinese for a transfer fee of €180,000. He made his Serie A debut on the first day of the 2006–07 season against Messina. He became the fourth Finnish footballer after Mika Aaltonen, Mika Lehkosuo and his brother Alexei Eremenko Jr to make an appearance in a Serie A match. He was loaned to A.C. Siena on 31 January 2007, where he played 11 games. During the summer of 2007, he returned to Udinese.

In October 2007, Eremenko, Andrea Dossena, Cristián Zapata, and Simone Pepe were awarded new contracts until June 2012.

=== Dynamo Kyiv ===
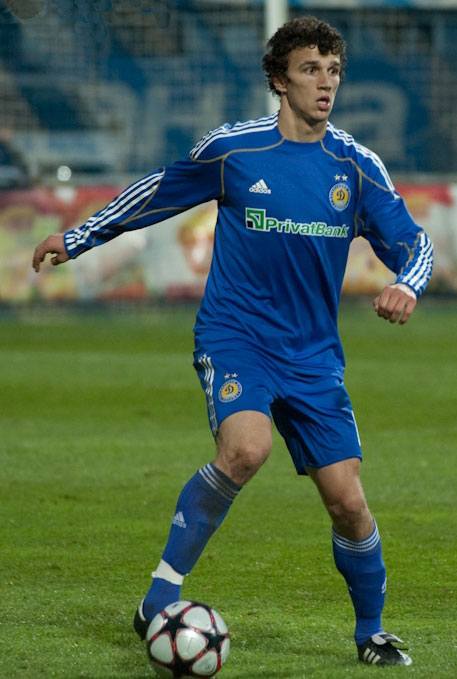
Eremenko with Dynamo Kyiv in 2009

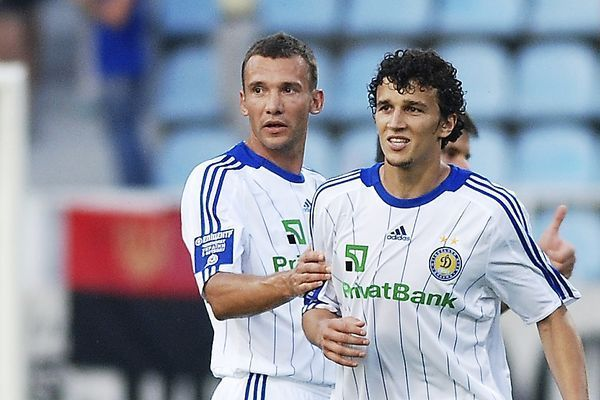
Eremenko with Andriy Shevchenko playing for Dynamo Kyiv in 2010

In August 2008, he was loaned to FC Dynamo Kyiv, until 31 May 2009. On 22 May 2009, he signed permanently with Dynamo Kyiv until 2014, for a €5 million fee. During his three years at Dynamo, Eremenko established himself as one of the leaders of the team.

Eremenko debuted in the Champions League on 17 September 2008, in a home game against Arsenal FC. That week, he also scored his first goal in the Ukrainian Premier League, netting a pass from Tiberiu Ghioane on the 8th minute of a game against Chornomorets Odesa. Eremenko scored his first goal in the Champions League on 10 December 2008 on Fenerbahçe.

During the 2009–10 season, he took part in a total of 35 official matches for Dynamo, 26 of which were in the Ukrainian championship, and scored 1 goal.

In the 2010–11 season, besides continuing his successful performance for Dynamo domestically, Eremenko became the top assistant of the Europa League.

After a total of three years of playing for Dynamo, Eremenko played in a total of 127 official games, and scored seven goals. He also won the 2008–09 Ukrainian Premier League, and the Ukrainian Super Cups in 2009 and 2011.

=== Rubin Kazan ===
In the last stages of the summer transfer window in 2011, Eremenko signed with Russian club Rubin Kazan for a reported fee of €13 million, which is the highest transfer fee ever paid for a Finnish player. His older brother Alexei also signed a contract with Rubin Kazan in August 2011. On 26 November, Roman scored his first goal for Rubin, in a 2–0 home victory over Dynamo Moscow.

On 9 May 2012, he scored the game's only goal in the Russian Cup final.

=== CSKA Moscow ===
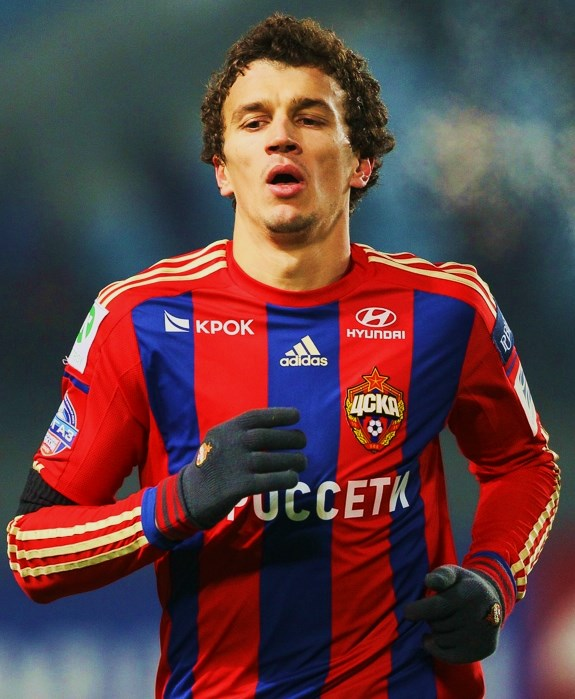
Eremenko with CSKA Moscow in 2014

After leaving Rubin Kazan in the summer of 2014, Eremenko signed a four-year contract with PFC CSKA Moscow on 25 August 2014, for a €6 million transfer fee. He was selected as the Best Player of October and December 2014 and March 2015 in the Russian Football Premier League. He won the Russian Football Premier League MVP of the season 2014–15 award.

On 6 October 2016, Finland announced that Eremenko had been handed a 30-day ban from football by UEFA. On 18 November 2016, UEFA announced that Roman had been handed a two-year ban from UEFA competitions due to testing positive for cocaine. In December 2016, FIFA extended Eremenko's ban to all football competitions. His appeal was rejected by UEFA and the ban was upheld on 6 March 2017.

=== Spartak Moscow ===
On 10 August 2018, Eremenko signed with Spartak Moscow, joining his younger brother Sergei at the team. His father Alexei Eremenko Sr. also played for Spartak. His disqualification expired on 6 October 2018 and he made his debut on 7 October against Yenisey Krasnoyarsk. Spartak released him from his contract on 8 January 2019.

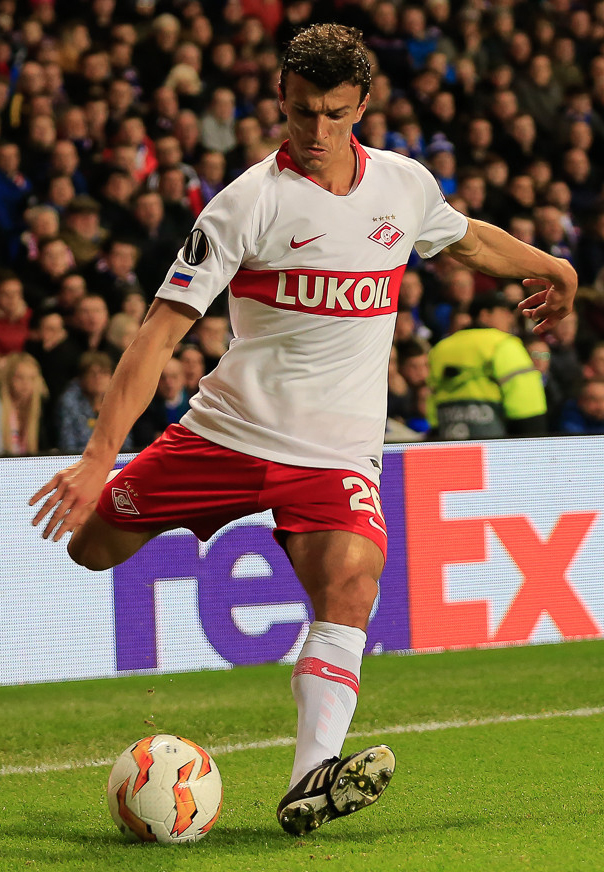
Eremenko with Spartak Moscow in 2018

=== Rostov ===
On 18 January 2019, Rostov announced the signing of Eremenko on a 2.5-year contract. Rostov (called FC Rostselmash at the time) was the first club of Roman's father, Alexei Eremenko Sr. In his third game for Rostov on 16 March 2019, he scored twice in the last 10 minutes to give his club a 2–0 away victory over Rubin Kazan.

On 14 June 2019, Rostov announced that Eremenko had extended his contract with the club for four years. On 23 February 2021, Eremenko left Rostov by mutual consent, partly due to COVID-19 pandemic.

=== HIFK ===
After a one-and-a-half-year hiatus from football, on 28 July 2022, Eremenko returned to Finnish football and joined Veikkausliiga club HIFK for the rest of the 2022 season, and reunited with the former national team head coach Mixu Paatelainen.

=== Honka ===
On 4 May 2023, Eremenko signed with Honka for the 2023 Veikkausliiga season. He helped the club to reach the 2023 Finnish Cup final.

=== Gnistan ===
On 1 May 2023, Eremenko signed with newly promoted Gnistan for their maiden season in top-tier Veikkausliiga. Eremenko made 19 appearances and scored two goals, and helped the team to finish 8th in the league and renew their league spot for the 2025. In January 2025, Eremenko was set to sign with Scottish club St Johnstone, coached by Simo Valakari, but was denied a work permit and the deal collapsed. Later in February he renewed his contract with Gnistan.

== International career ==
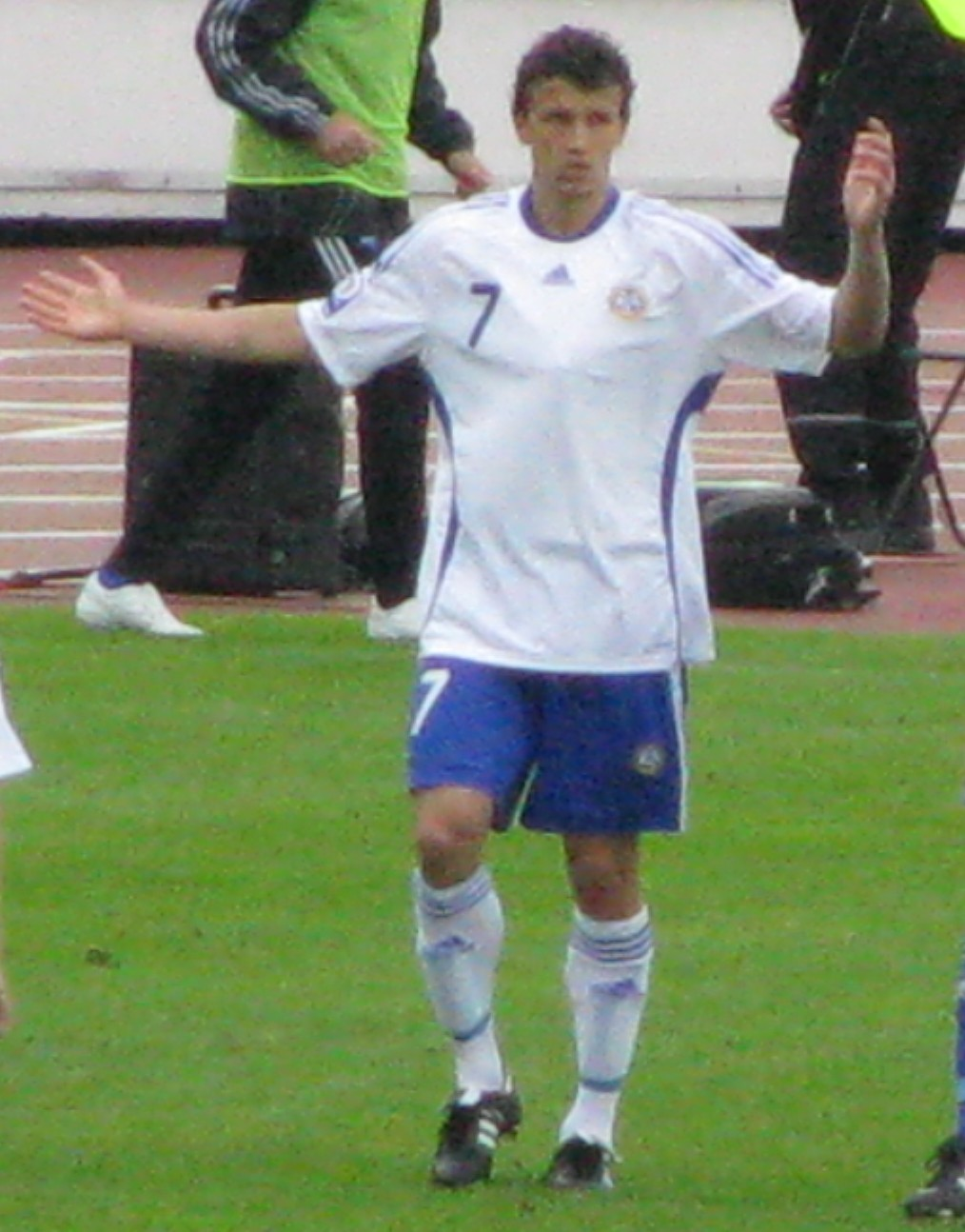
Eremenko playing for the Finland national team in 2009

Eremenko made his international debut in the Finland national team at Helsinki Olympic Stadium on 6 June 2007 in a UEFA Euro 2008 qualification match against Belgium when Roy Hodgson chose him to the starting line up. The game was interrupted for six minutes after a Eurasian eagle-owl intruded the playing pitch. This incident earned the Finland team their current nickname, The Eagle Owls. Eremenko remained as a regular member for Finland until his doping ban in 2016 and he was a key player in Finland's qualification campaigns for 2010 FIFA World Cup, UEFA Euro 2012, 2014 FIFA World Cup and UEFA Euro 2016. He scored his first goal for Finland from penalty spot on 3 March 2010 in a friendly match against Malta.

On 30 May 2025, Eremenko was called up to the Finland national team, after a nine-year absence, for the World Cup qualifying matches against Netherlands and Poland.

== Personal life ==
Roman Eremenko is married to Marika Eremenko and has four children. Eremenko moved to Finland with his family at the age of three when his father, former FC Dynamo Moscow and FC Spartak Moscow player Alexei Eremenko Sr., came to play in Finland with FF Jaro. He was granted Finnish citizenship in 2003, but still holds a Russian passport as well, Eremenko is the younger brother of Alexei Eremenko Jr and the older brother of Sergei Eremenko. His father took over as manager in Jaro in August 2009.

In 2016, he was suspended for two years because of doping after failing a doping test. He tested positive for cocaine based on a sample done by UEFA. In late 2023, Eremenko admitted in Finnish media that he was addicted to cocaine at the time when he got caught in 2016.

== Career statistics ==
=== Club ===
As of 18 May 2026

Appearances and goals by club, season and competition
Club	Season	League			National cup (Note: Includes Suomen Cup, Coppa Italia, Ukrainian Cup and Russian Cup)		Europe		Other		Total	
Club	Season	Division	Apps	Goals	Apps	Goals	Apps	Goals	Apps	Goals	Apps	Goals
Jaro	2004	Veikkausliiga	6	1	0	0	–		–		6	1
Jaro	2005	Veikkausliiga	13	2	0	0	–		–		13	2
Jaro	Total		19	3	0	0	0	0	0	0	19	3
GBK (loan)	2004	Ykkönen	3	0	0	0	–		–		3	0
Udinese	2005–06	Serie A	0	0	0	0	–		–		0	0
Udinese	2006–07	Serie A	6	0	3	0	–		–		9	0
Udinese	2007–08	Serie A	7	0	4	0	–		–		11	0
Udinese	Total		13	0	7	0	0	0	0	0	20	0
Siena (loan)	2006–07	Serie A	11	0	0	0	–		–		11	0
Dynamo Kyiv (loan)	2008–09	Ukrainian Premier League	19	1	0	0	7 (Note: Appearances in UEFA Champions League and UEFA Cup)	1	–		26	2
Dynamo Kyiv	2009–10	Ukrainian Premier League	26	1	3	0	6 (Note: Appearances in UEFA Champions League)	0	1 (Note: Appearance(s) in Ukrainian Super Cup)	0	36	1
Dynamo Kyiv	2010–11	Ukrainian Premier League	26	3	3	0	16 (Note: Appearances in UEFA Champions League and UEFA Europa League)	1	–		45	4
Dynamo Kyiv	2011–12	Ukrainian Premier League	6	0	1	0	4	0	1	0	12	0
Dynamo Kyiv	Total		58	4	7	0	26	1	2	0	93	5
Rubin Kazan	2011–12	Russian Premier League	21	2	4	1	0	0	–		25	3
Rubin Kazan	2012–13	Russian Premier League	25	6	2	0	10 (Note: Appearances in UEFA Europa League)	0	1 (Note: Appearance(s) in Russian Super Cup)	0	37	6
Rubin Kazan	2013–14	Russian Premier League	27	3	1	0	11	5	–		39	8
Rubin Kazan	Total		73	11	7	1	22	5	1	0	103	17
CSKA Moscow	2014–15	Russian Premier League	25	13	2	0	6	0	–		33	13
CSKA Moscow	2015–16	Russian Premier League	25	3	1	0	7	0	–		33	3
CSKA Moscow	2016–17	Russian Premier League	9	3	1	0	2	1	1	0	11	4
CSKA Moscow	Total		59	19	4	0	15	1	1	0	78	20
Spartak Moscow	2018–19	Russian Premier League	4	0	1	0	2	0	–		7	0
Rostov	2018–19	Russian Premier League	9	3	2	1	–		–		11	4
Rostov	2019–20	Russian Premier League	19	5	0	0	–		–		19	5
Rostov	2020–21	Russian Premier League	16	1	1	0	1	0	–		18	1
Rostov	Total		44	9	3	1	1	0	0	0	48	10
HIFK	2022	Veikkausliiga	11	2	1	0	–		0	0	12	2
Honka	2023	Veikkausliiga	21	3	5	1	2 (Note: Appearances in UEFA Europa Conference League)	0	0	0	28	4
Gnistan	2024	Veikkausliiga	19	2	0	0	–		0	0	19	2
Gnistan	2025	Veikkausliiga	20	2	0	0	–		0	0	20	2
Gnistan	2026	Veikkausliiga	6	0	0	0	–		0	0	6	0
Gnistan	Total		45	4	0	0	0	0	0	0	45	4
Career total			380	56	35	3	75	8	4	0	488	64

=== International ===
As of 15 November 2026

Appearances and goals by national team and year
National team	Year	Apps	Goals
Finland	2007	6	0
Finland	2008	8	0
Finland	2009	10	0
Finland	2010	8	1
Finland	2011	9	0
Finland	2012	6	1
Finland	2013	14	1
Finland	2014	8	2
Finland	2015	3	0
Finland	2016	5	0
Finland	2017	0	0
Finland	2018	0	0
Finland	2019	0	0
Finland	2020	0	0
Finland	2021	0	0
Finland	2022	0	0
Finland	2023	0	0
Finland	2024	0	0
Finland	2025	0	0
Finland	2026	1	0
Total		74	5

As of 7 September 2014

Scores and results list Finland's goal tally first, score column indicates score after each Eremenko goal.

List of international goals scored by Roman Eremenko
No.	Date	Venue	Opponent	Score	Result	Competition
1	3 March 2010	Ta'Qali, Malta	Malta	1–1	2–1	Friendly
2	26 May 2012	Salzburg, Austria	Turkey	1–0	3–2	Friendly
3	10 September 2013	Tbilisi, Georgia	Georgia	1–0	1–0	2014 FIFA World Cup qualification
4	5 March 2014	Győr, Hungary	Hungary	2–1	2–1	Friendly
5	7 September 2014	Thorshavn, Faroe Islands	Faroe Islands	3–1	3–1	UEFA Euro 2016 qualifying

== Honours ==
Dynamo Kyiv

- Ukrainian Premier League: 2008–09
- Ukrainian Super Cup: 2009, 2011

Rubin Kazan

- Russian Cup: 2011–12
- Russian Super Cup: 2012

CSKA Moscow

- Russian Premier League: 2015–16

Honka

- Finnish Cup runner-up: 2023

Individual

- Finnish Football Association Player of the Year: 2011, 2014
- Finnish Sports' Journalists Player of the Year: 2011, 2014, 2015
- UEFA Europa League most assists leading to a goal in tournament phase: 2010–11
- Russian League MVP of the season: 2014–15
- Russian Premier League Player of the Month: October 2014, December 2014, March 2015
