= Akim Sairinen =

Finnish footballer (born 1994)

Personal information
- Full name: Akim Saeed Sairinen
- Date of birth: 22 May 1994 (age 32)
- Place of birth: Ristiina, Finland
- Height: 1.87 m (6 ft 2 in)
- Position: Centre back

Team information
- Current team: SJK II
- Number: 24

Youth career
- MP
- Fuengirola Los Boliches

Senior career*
Years	Team	Apps	(Gls)
2012	MiKi	1	(0)
2013–2015	MP	69	(4)
2016	EIF	27	(0)
2017	Gjøvik-Lyn	25	(1)
2018–2019	Tammeka	72	(5)
2020	Florø	12	(1)
2021	Dainava	35	(0)
2022	PIF	11	(0)
2023	Panargiakos	?	(?)
2024	Lynx	10	(0)
2024	MP	7	(0)
2025–2026	TPS	32	(2)
2026–	SJK II	9	(0)
- * Club domestic league appearances and goals as of 1 November 2026

Akim Saeed Sairinen (born 22 May 1994) is a Finnish professional football defender, playing for Ykkösliiga side SJK II.

== Career ==
Sairinen played in a youth sector of his hometown club Mikkelin Palloilijat since he was five years old. Later in his teens, he lived briefly in Fuengirola, Spain, with his mother and played football there. After returning to Finland, he made his senior debut with MP's associate team Mikkelin Kissat in fourth-tier Kolmonen in 2012. With MP first team, Sairinen played two seasons in third-tier Kakkonen and one season in second-tier Ykkönen, followed by another Ykkönen season with Ekenäs IF in 2016, before moving to Gjøvik-Lyn in Norway in 2017.

During 2018 and 2019, he played for JK Tammeka in Estonian premier division Meistriliiga, before returning to Norway to sign with Florø SK for the 2020 season.

In 2021, Sairinen played for Lithuanian club FK Dainava in top-tier A Lyga. In the early 2022, he returned to Finland and signed with second-tier club Pargas IF.

In January 2023, he moved to Greece and signed with Panargiakos in Gamma Ethniki for the rest of the 2022–23 season.

In January 2024, Sairinen signed with Lynx, playing in Gibraltar Football League, country's top-tier league.

On 22 August 2024, Sairinen returned to Finland and signed with his former club MP for the remainder of the season.

On 28 February 2025, he joined TPS in second-tier Ykkösliiga. Sairinen scored his first goal for TPS on 2 May, in a 6–0 away win against JäPS.

== Career statistics ==
As of 1 July 2025

Appearances and goals by club, season and competition
Club	Season	League			National cup (Note: Includes Suomen Cup, Norwegian Cup, Estonian Cup, Lithuanian Cup and Gibraltar Rock Cup)		Other		Total	
Club	Season	Division	Apps	Goals	Apps	Goals	Apps	Goals	Apps	Goals
MiKi	2012	Kolmonen	1	0	0	0	—		1	0
MP	2013	Kakkonen	25	4	0	0	—		25	4
MP	2014	Kakkonen	21	0	0	0	—		21	0
MP	2015	Ykkönen	23	0	1	0	—		24	0
MP	Total		69	4	1	0	0	0	70	4
Ekenäs IF	2016	Ykkönen	27	0	1	0	—		28	0
Gjøvik-Lyn	2017	3. divisjon	25	1	1	0	—		26	0
Tammeka	2018	Meistriliiga	36	4	4	0	—		40	4
Tammeka	2019	Meistriliiga	36	1	4	1	—		40	2
Tammeka	Total		72	5	8	1	0	0	80	6
Florø	2020	2. divisjon	12	1	0	0	—		12	1
Dainava	2021	A Lyga	35	0	0	0	—		35	0
Pargas IF	2022	Ykkönen	11	0	1	0	—		12	0
Panargiakos	2022–23	Gamma Ethniki								
Lynx	2023–24	Gibraltar Football League	10	0	1	0	—		11	0
MP	2024	Ykkösliiga	7	0	—		—		7	0
TPS	2025	Ykkösliiga	12	1	3	1	6 (Note: Includes Ykkösliigacup)	0	21	2
Career total			297	12	16	2	6	0	319	14
