= Joona Lautamaja =

Finnish footballer (born 1995)

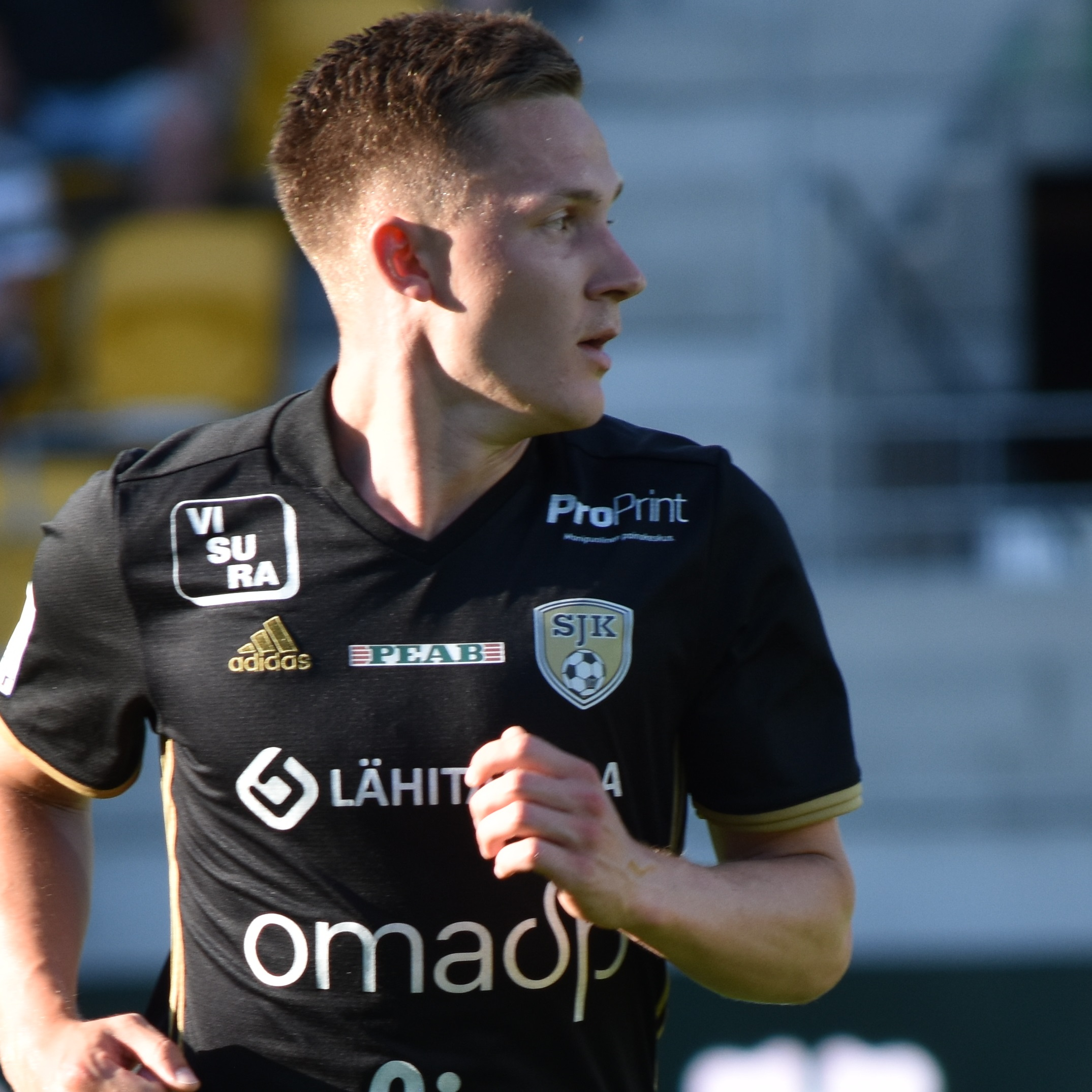
- Lautamaja with SJK in 2018.

Personal information
- Date of birth: 12 July 1995 (age 31)
- Place of birth: Seinäjoki, Finland
- Height: 1.81 m (5 ft 11 in)
- Position: Midfielder

Senior career*
Years	Team	Apps	(Gls)
2012–2020	SJK	18	(0)
2013–2020	SJK Akatemia	113	(6)
2016	→ KuPS (loan)	23	(0)
2017	→ KuFu-98 (loan)	14	(1)
- * Club domestic league appearances and goals as of 17 October 2020

Joona Lautamaja (born 12 July 1995) is a Finnish professional footballer who plays as a midfielder.
