= Aleksei Yeryomenko =

Russian footballer (born 1964)

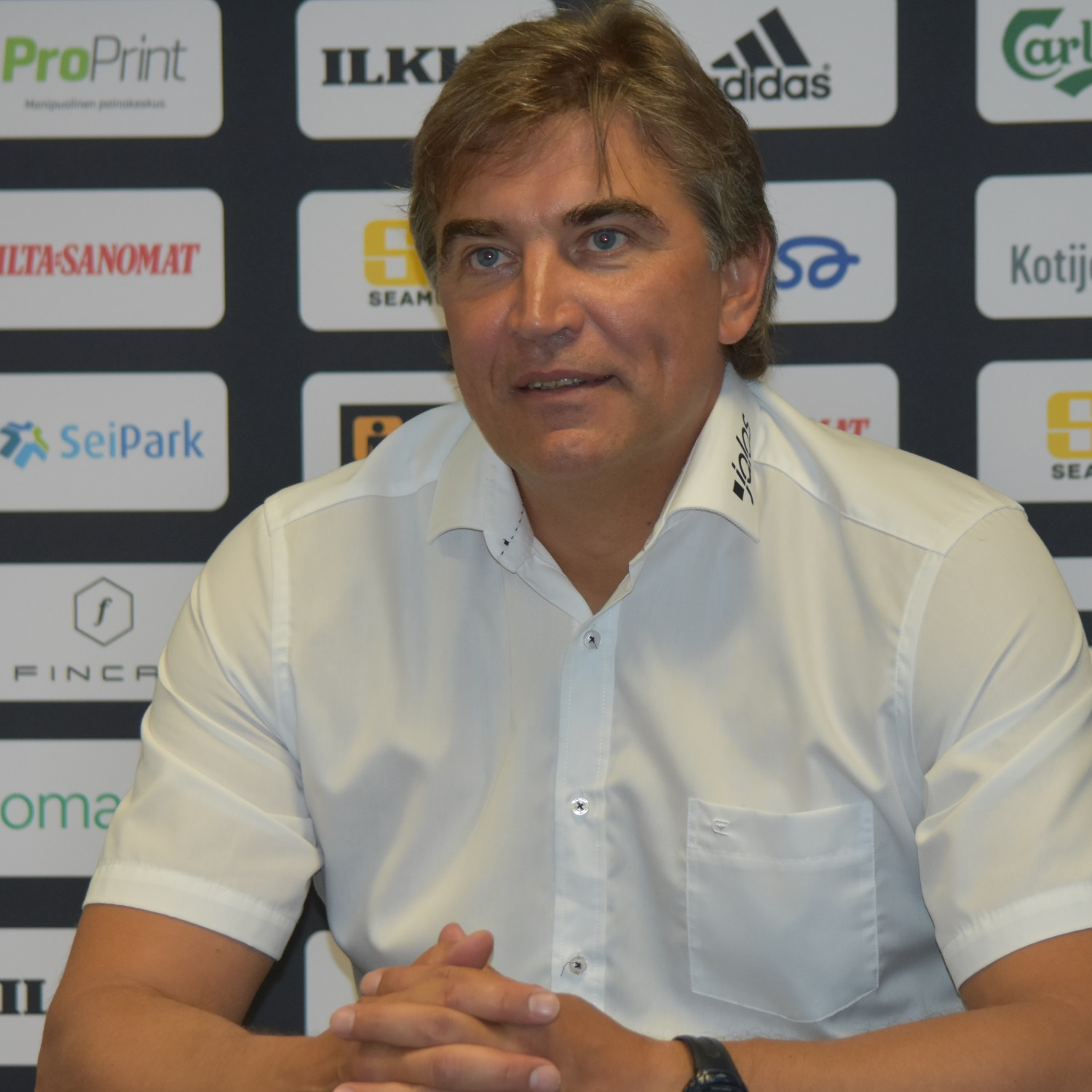
- Yeryomenko with SJK in 2018

Personal information
- Full name: Aleksei Borisovich Yeryomenko
- Date of birth: 17 January 1964 (age 62)
- Place of birth: Novocherkassk, Russian SFSR
- Height: 1.79 m (5 ft 10 in)
- Position: Midfielder

Senior career*
Years	Team	Apps	(Gls)
1981	Rostselmash Rostov-on-Don	5	(1)
1981–1985	SKA Rostov-on-Don	54	(0)
1986–1987	Spartak Moscow	26	(5)
1987	Rostselmash Rostov-on-Don	21	(1)
1988	Torpedo Moscow	9	(1)
1988–1990	Dynamo Moscow	36	(3)
1990	OLS Oulu	11	(11)
1991–1994	Jaro	111	(21)
1994–1995	Athinaikos	16	(0)
1995–1997	Jaro	76	(17)
1998	Tromsø	26	(0)
1999–2003	HJK Helsinki	123	(20)
2003–2005	Jaro	50	(7)
2006–2009	JBK		

Managerial career
- 2006–2009: JBK
- 2009–2016: Jaro
- 2016: Finland U18
- 2016–2017: Shakhter Karagandy
- 2017: Pyunik
- 2018–2019: SJK
- 2020: Spartaks Jūrmala
- 2022: Narva Trans
- 2023: Esse IK
- 2023–2024: Narva Trans
- 2024–: Jaro Akademi
- * Club domestic league appearances and goals

Aleksei Borisovich Yeryomenko (Russian: Алексей Борисович Ерёменко; born 17 January 1964), also known as Alexei Eremenko Sr. is a Russian professional football manager and a former player who also holds Finnish citizenship. He last managed Estonian club JK Trans Narva.

== Playing career ==
Yeryomenko made his debut in the Soviet Top League in 1981 for FC SKA Rostov-on-Don. In the early 1990s, he moved to Finland, where he played for Jaro (1991–94 and 1995–1997) and HJK Helsinki (1999–2003). With the latter team, he played alongside his eldest son Alexei Eremenko, 19 years his junior, and together, they helped their side win two Finnish championships in 2002 and 2003, thus becoming the first-ever father-son duo in the history of football to win a title in the top tier. He retired at Jaro in 2005, aged 41.

== Managerial career ==
Yeryomenko was the manager of the Finnish club FF Jaro between August 2009 and June 2016. On 4 August 2016, Yeryomenko was appointed as manager of Kazakhstan Premier League side Shakhter Karagandy, being fired on 29 May 2017. On 8 August 2017, Yeryomenko signed a one-year contract with Armenian side FC Pyunik, but left the club on 31 October 2017. On 22 May 2018, SJK announced that Yeryomenko had replaced Tommi Kautonen as their manager after their poor start to the season. On 11 February 2020, FK Spartaks announced that Yeryomenko had been signed as their new manager.

== Personal life ==
He is the father and agent of Alexei Eremenko, Roman Eremenko and Sergei Eremenko.

== European club competition appearances ==
- UEFA Cup 1986–87 with FC Spartak Moscow: 6 games.
- UEFA Intertoto Cup 1996 with FF Jaro: 4 games.
- UEFA Cup 1999-00 with HJK.
- UEFA Cup 2000-01 with HJK.
- UEFA Cup 2001-02 with HJK.
- UEFA Cup 2002-03 with HJK.

== Managerial statistics ==
As of 24 April 2024

Team	Nat	From	To	Record				
Team	Nat	From	To	G	W	D	L	Win %
Jaro	(Finland)	19 August 2009	9 June 2016	237	66	65	106	27.85
Shakhter Karagandy	(Kazakhstan)	4 August 2016	29 May 2017	27	11	3	13	40.74
Pyunik	(Armenia)	3 August 2017	31 October 2017	12	1	5	6	8.33
SJK Seinäjoki	(Finland)	22 May 2018	16 August 2019	49	13	15	21	26.53
Spartaks Jūrmala	(Latvia)	11 February 2020	30 November 2020	29	12	7	10	41.38
Narva Trans	(Estonia)	1 January 2022	12 November 2022	40	14	7	19	35.00
Narva Trans	(Estonia)	20 August 2023	24 April 2024	22	5	2	15	22.73
Total				416	122	104	190	29.33

== Honours ==
Individual

- Veikkausliiga Coach of the Month: September 2010, June 2012, July 2013
