= Sergei Eremenko =

Finnish footballer (born 1999)

Personal information
- Full name: Sergei Alekseyevich Eremenko
- Date of birth: 6 January 1999 (age 27)
- Place of birth: Jakobstad, Finland
- Height: 1.81 m (5 ft 11 in)
- Position: Midfielder

Team information
- Current team: Gnistan
- Number: 14

Youth career
- –2013: Jaro

Senior career*
Years	Team	Apps	(Gls)
2014–2016	Jaro	34	(2)
2016–2018	Basel	0	(0)
2018–2022	Spartaks Jūrmala	23	(1)
2018	→ Spartak Moscow (loan)	0	(0)
2018	→ Spartak-2 Moscow (loan)	9	(0)
2019	→ SJK (loan)	18	(0)
2020–2021	→ Orenburg (loan)	0	(0)
2020–2021	→ Orenburg-2 (loan)	2	(0)
2021	→ AC Oulu (loan)	15	(0)
2022	→ HIFK (loan)	17	(1)
2023–2025	Jaro	79	(13)
2026–	Gnistan	28	(2)

International career
2015–2016	Finland U17	7	(3)
2016	Finland U18	2	(0)
2016–2017	Finland U19	9	(3)
- * Club domestic league appearances and goals as of 13 November 2026

Sergei Eremenko (Russian: Сергей Алексеевич Ерёменко; born 6 January 1999) is a Finnish football player who plays for Veikkausliiga club Gnistan.

== Club career ==
Eremenko made his professional debut in the Veikkausliiga for FF Jaro on 6 July 2014 in a game against Vaasan Palloseura. In October 2016, Eremenko was noted by The Guardian in the list of top 60 best young talents in world football, becoming the second Finnish player on the said list after Kaan Kairinen a year before.

On 5 February 2018, he transferred to FK Spartaks Jūrmala, who loaned him to FC Spartak Moscow until the end of 2018. On 31 December 2018, his loan term expired and he was removed by Spartak from their Premier League registration list without playing any games for the main squad.

On 25 January 2019, he joined Finnish club SJK Seinäjoki on loan.

On 2 February 2022, Eremenko signed a contract with HIFK for the 2022 season.

On 9 March 2023, Eremenko returned to FF Jaro on a one-year deal.

== International ==
Eremenko holds a Finnish passport and represented Finland in juniors until March 2018, when the Football Association of Finland announced that Eremenko had informed them of his refusal to represent Finland internationally anymore in hopes of eventually representing Russia.

== Personal life ==
Eremenko's older brothers Roman Eremenko and Alexei Eremenko are Finnish international footballers, and his father Alexei Eremenko Sr. is a football manager and former footballer.

== Career statistics ==
As of 27 July 2026

Appearances and goals by club, season and competition
Club	Season	League			Cup (Note: Includes Suomen Cup and Russian Cup)		League cup (Note: Includes Finnish League Cup)		Europe		Total	
Club	Season	Division	Apps	Goals	Apps	Goals	Apps	Goals	Apps	Goals	Apps	Goals
Jaro	2014	Veikkausliiga	2	0	–		–		–		2	0
Jaro	2015	Veikkausliiga	19	2	1	0	2	2	–		22	4
Jaro	2016	Ykkönen	11	0	2	1	–		–		13	1
Jaro	Total		32	2	3	1	2	2	0	0	37	5
Jakobstads BK	2015	Kakkonen	3	0	–		–		–		3	0
Jakobstads BK	2016	Kolmonen	3	0	–		–		–		3	0
Jakobstads BK	Total		6	0	0	0	0	0	0	0	6	0
Basel U21	2016–17	Swiss Promotion League	3	0	–		–		–		3	0
Basel U21	2017–18	Swiss Promotion League	9	0	–		–		–		9	0
Basel U21	Total		12	0	0	0	0	0	0	0	12	0
Spartaks Jūrmala	2018	Virslīga	0	0	0	0	–		–		0	0
Spartaks Jūrmala	2019	Virslīga	7	1	–		–		–		7	1
Spartaks Jūrmala	2020	Virslīga	16	0	–		–		–		16	0
Spartaks Jūrmala	Total		23	1	0	0	0	0	0	0	23	1
Spartak Moscow (loan)	2017–18	Russian Premier League	0	0	0	0	–		0	0	0	0
Spartak-2 Moscow (loan)	2017–18	Russian First League	2	0	–		–		–		2	0
Spartak-2 Moscow (loan)	2018–19	Russian First League	7	0	–		–		–		7	0
Spartak-2 Moscow (loan)	Total		9	0	0	0	0	0	0	0	9	0
SJK Seinäjoki (loan)	2019	Veikkausliiga	14	0	4	0	–		–		18	0
Orenburg (loan)	2020–21	Russian First League	0	0	1	0	–		–		1	0
Orenburg-2 (loan)	2020–21	Russian Second League	2	0	–		–		–		2	0
AC Oulu (loan)	2021	Veikkausliiga	17	0	0	0	–		–		17	0
HIFK (loan)	2022	Veikkausliiga	17	1	6	1	4	0	–		27	2
Jaro	2023	Ykkönen	26	6	1	0	–		–		27	6
Jaro	2024	Ykkösliiga	29	7	2	1	6	1	–		37	9
Jaro	2025	Veikkausliiga	26	1	4	0	1	0	–		31	1
Jaro	Total		81	14	7	1	7	1	0	0	95	16
Gnistan	2026	Veikkausliiga	16	1	0	0	5	2	–		21	3
Career total			229	19	21	3	18	5	0	0	268	27

== Honours ==
Jaro

- Ykkösliiga runner-up: 2024

Individual

- Ykkösliiga Midfielder of the Year: 2024
