= SJK Akatemia =

Finnish football club

- Short name: SJK Akatemia
- Founded: 2012
- Ground: OmaSP Stadion, Seinäjoki, Finland
- Capacity: 5,900
- Head Coach: Toni Lehtinen
- League: Ykkönen
- 2026: Ykkösliiga, 10th of 10 (relegated)
Home colours	Away colours	Third colours

SJK Akatemia (also referred to as SJK II, formerly Kerho 07 in 2013–2015) is a football club from Seinäjoki in Finland. The club was formed in 2012 and their home ground is at the OmaSP Stadion. SJK Akatemia is the reserve team of Seinäjoen Jalkapallokerho (SJK) and currently plays in the Ykkösliiga, the new second level of football in Finland.

SJK Akatemia also contains SJK U17. In 2018, SJK started a football high school with Kuortane sports school, producing young players to SJK and SJK Akatemia.

== Current squad ==
As of 3 September 2026

Note: Flags indicate national team as defined under FIFA eligibility rules; some limited exceptions apply. Players may hold more than one non-FIFA nationality.

No.	Pos.	Nation	Player
2	DF	FIN	Topi Mustonen
3	DF	FIN	Oskari Raiski
4	FW	FIN	Oskar Pihlaja
5	DF	FIN	Eero Lehto
6	MF	SLO	Nikola Vuksanovic
7	FW	FIN	Abdu Muchipay
8	MF	FIN	Aniis Machaal
9	FW	KEN	Lawrence Ouma
10	FW	FRA	Ilyes Berjali
11	FW	FIN	Elari Hautamäki
14	DF	BRA	Cauet Werner
15	DF	FIN	Eerik Salmivuori
16	FW	LAT	Haralds Silagailis
17	FW	GUI	Momo Cissé
18	MF	FIN	Leon Vesterbacka
19	FW	CIV	Ange Achi

No.	Pos.	Nation	Player
20	DF	MLI	Souleimane Bagayogo
21	MF	ZIM	Prosper Padera
22	MF	FIN	Taavi Kangaskokko
23	DF	FIN	Topias Töllinen
24	DF	FIN	Akim Sairinen
25	GK	FIN	Niki Hasselman
26	DF	FIN	Adam Zahedi
27	MF	FIN	Jore Nikkilä
28	MF	BRA	Guto
29	FW	FIN	Noah Rantasalmi
36	DF	FIN	Iiro Kangasniemi
38	FW	FIN	Aatu Piiroinen
39	MF	FIN	Elohim Nzoko
49	FW	FIN	Akseli Aaltonen
60	GK	NGR	Samuel Friday James
—	DF	GHA	Emmanuel Terribaya

=== Out on loan ===
Note: Flags indicate national team as defined under FIFA eligibility rules; some limited exceptions apply. Players may hold more than one non-FIFA nationality.

No.	Pos.	Nation	Player

== League history ==
Season to season of SJK Akatemia
- 4 season in Ykkönen/Ykkösliiga (Tier 2)
- 6 seasons in Kakkonen (Tier 3)
- 2 seasons in Kolmonen (Tier 4)

Season	Level	Division	Section	Administration	Position	Movements
2013	Tier 3	Kakkonen (Second Division)	Northern Group	Finnish FA (Suomen Palloliitto)	7th	
2014	Tier 3	Kakkonen (Second Division)	Western Group	Finnish FA (Suomen Palloliitto)	6th	
2015	Tier 3	Kakkonen (Second Division)	Northern Group	Finnish FA (Suomen Palloliitto)	9th	Relegated
2016	Tier 4	Kolmonen (Third Division)	Northern Ostrobothnia & Vaasa	Finnish FA, Vaasa District (SPL Vaasa)	2nd	
2017	Tier 4	Kolmonen (Third Division)	Northern Ostrobothnia & Vaasa	Finnish FA, Vaasa District (SPL Vaasa)	1st	Promoted
2018	Tier 3	Kakkonen (Second Division)	Group C	Finnish FA (Suomen Palloliitto)	3rd	
2019	Tier 3	Kakkonen (Second Division)	Group C	Finnish FA (Suomen Palloliitto)	1st	Promoted
2020	Tier 2	Ykkönen (First Division)		Finnish FA (Suomen Palloliitto)	11th	Relegated
2021	Tier 3	Kakkonen (Second Division)	Group C	Finnish FA (Suomen Palloliitto)	1st	Promoted
2022	Tier 2	Ykkönen (First Division)		Finnish FA (Suomen Palloliitto)	9th	
2023	Tier 2	Ykkönen (First Division)		Finnish FA (Suomen Palloliitto)	4th	
2024	Tier 2	Ykkösliiga (League One)		Finnish FA (Suomen Palloliitto)	7th	
2025	Tier 2	Ykkösliiga (League One)		Finnish FA (Suomen Palloliitto)		

== Staff ==
- Head Coaches: Stevie Grieve and Arttu Aromaa
- Fitness Coaches: Tommi Pärmäkoski, Pekka Koskela, Jaakko Ojaniemi, Mika Hormalainen and Mikko Kujala
- Goalkeeping Coaches: Luis Fernando and Jari Kujala
- Team Manager, Secretary: Jorma Tuohisaari
