= 2019 HJK season =

HJK
2019 season
- Chairman: Olli-Pekka Lyytikäinen
- Manager: Mika Lehkosuo (until 22 May); Toni Koskela (from 22 May)
- Stadium: Telia 5G -areena
- Veikkausliiga: 5th
- Finnish Cup: Sixth Round
- UEFA Champions League: Second qualifying round vs Red Star Belgrade
- UEFA Champions League: Third qualifying round vs Riga FC
- Top goalscorer: League: Riku Riski (6); All: Riku Riski (11)
Home colours	Away colours

The 2019 season is Helsingin Jalkapalloklubi's 111th competitive season.

== Season events ==
=== New contracts ===
On 30 November 2018, Faith Obilor signed a new contract until the end of the 2019 season.

On 8 February, Kevin Kouassivi-Benissan signed a new contract until the end of the 2020 season, with an option for an additional year.

On 22 February, Nikolai Alho signed a new contract until the end of the 2019 season.

On 15 March, Riku Riski signed a new contract until the end of the 2021 season.

On 17 June, Santeri Väänänen signed a new contract until the end of the 2021 season.

== Squad ==
As of match played 27 October 2019

No.	Name	Nationality	Position	Date of birth (age)	Signed from	Signed in	Contract ends	Apps.	Goals
Goalkeepers
1	Markus Uusitalo	(Finland)	GK	15 May 1997 (aged 22)	VPS	2016	2018+1	39	0
12	Robin Källman	(Finland)	GK	12 February 1999 (aged 20)	Klubi 04	2018	2019+1	0	0
88	Maksim Rudakov	(Russia)	GK	22 January 1996 (aged 23)	loan from Zenit St.Petersburg	2017	2019	77	0
Defenders
3	Henri Toivomäki	(Finland)	DF	21 February 1991 (aged 28)	KuPS	2019		27	0
5	Daniel O'Shaughnessy	(Finland)	DF	14 September 1994 (aged 25)	Cheltenham Town	2018	2019+1	55	6
8	Rafinha	(Brazil)	DF	29 June 1982 (aged 37)	Gent	2017	2019	205	12
16	Victor Luiz	(Brazil)	DF	5 December 1997 (aged 21)	loan from Cruzeiro	2019	2019	5	0
17	Nikolai Alho	(Finland)	DF	12 March 1993 (aged 26)	Halmstads BK	2018	2019	195	24
18	Roni Peiponen	(Finland)	DF	9 April 1997 (aged 22)	Molde	2018	2019+1	67	2
32	Faith Obilor	(Nigeria)	DF	5 March 1991 (aged 28)	Inter Turku	2017	2019	112	4
33	Samu Laitinen	(Finland)	DF	13 August 1999 (aged 20)	Klubi 04	2018		5	0
Midfields
6	Harmeet Singh	(Norway)	MF	12 November 1990 (aged 28)	Sarpsborg 08	2019		11	0
7	Eetu Vertainen	(Finland)	MF	11 May 1999 (aged 20)	Klubi 04	2017	2018+1	59	10
14	Sebastian Dahlström (captain)	(Finland)	MF	5 November 1996 (aged 22)	Klubi 04	2015	2019	147	16
15	William Parra	(Colombia)	MF	1 March 1995 (aged 24)	loan from Independiente Medellín	2019	2019	14	2
21	Petteri Forsell	(Finland)	MF	16 October 1990 (aged 29)	loan from Miedź Legnica	2019	2019	13	3
22	Kaan Kairinen	(Finland)	MF	22 December 1998 (aged 20)	loan from Midtjylland	2019	2019	35	3
50	Santeri Väänänen	(Finland)	MF	1 January 2002 (aged 17)	Klubi 04	2018	2021	18	0
67	Matti Peltola	(Finland)	MF	3 July 2002 (aged 17)	Klubi 04	2019		1	0
Forwards
9	Riku Riski	(Finland)	FW	16 August 1989 (aged 30)	Odd	2018	2021	63	20
10	Marco Bueno	(Mexico)	FW	31 March 1994 (aged 25)	Pachuca	2019	2019+1	9	0
11	Akseli Pelvas	(Finland)	FW	8 February 1989 (aged 30)	Falkenbergs FF	2016	2019	204	77
13	Sekou Camara	(Guinea)	FW	20 July 1997 (aged 22)	loan from Besëlidhja Lezhë	2019	2019	3	0
19	Tim Väyrynen	(Finland)	FW	30 March 1993 (aged 26)	Roda JC Kerkrade	2019		16	3
20	Ivan Tarasov	(Russia)	FW	30 January 2000 (aged 19)	loan from Zenit St.Petersburg	2019	2019	17	0
30	Joonas Vahtera	(Finland)	FW	6 January 1996 (aged 23)	VPS	2019	2021+1	12	2
77	Evans Mensah	(Ghana)	FW	9 February 1998 (aged 21)	Inter Allies	2017	2019+1	104	24
80	Erfan Zeneli	(Finland)	FW	28 December 1986 (aged 32)	RoPS	2019	2019		
	Samuel Anini	(Finland)	FW	7 September 2002 (aged 17)	PK Keski-Uusimaa	2019	2020+1		
Away on loan
16	Kalle Katz	(Finland)	DF	4 January 2000 (aged 19)	Klubi 04	2018		1	0
27	Kevin Kouassivi-Benissan	(Finland)	MF	25 January 1999 (aged 20)	Klubi 04	2018	2020+1	17	0
37	Julius Tauriainen	(Finland)	MF	18 April 2001 (aged 18)	Klubi 04	2019		2	0
38	Enoch Banza	(Finland)	FW	4 February 2000 (aged 19)	Klubi 04	2017	2019+1	15	1
61	Otto Ollikainen	(Finland)	MF	22 January 2001 (aged 18)	Klubi 04	2018		2	0
Left during the season
2	Elderson	(Nigeria)	DF	20 January 1988 (aged 31)	AS Monaco	2019		5	2
24	Lassi Lappalainen	(Finland)	FW	24 August 1998 (aged 21)	Klubi 04	2015		50	7
25	Valtteri Vesiaho	(Finland)	DF	10 February 1999 (aged 20)	Klubi 04	2017	2018+1	29	1

=== On loan ===
Note: Flags indicate national team as defined under FIFA eligibility rules; some limited exceptions apply. Players may hold more than one non-FIFA nationality.

No.	Pos.	Nation	Player
16	DF	FIN	Kalle Katz (at RoPS)
27	MF	FIN	Kevin Kouassivi-Benissan (at RoPS)
37	MF	FIN	Julius Tauriainen (at Freiburg II)

No.	Pos.	Nation	Player
38	FW	FIN	Enoch Banza (at KPV)
61	MF	FIN	Otto Ollikainen (at TPS)

== Transfers ==
=== In ===
Date	Position	Nationality	Name	From	Fee	Ref.
	DF	(Finland)	Henri Toivomäki	KuPS	Undisclosed	
21 December 2018	FW	(Finland)	Joonas Vahtera	VPS	Undisclosed	
7 January 2019	DF	(Finland)	Väinö Vehkonen	JJK	Undisclosed	
9 March 2019	DF	(Nigeria)	Elderson	AS Monaco	Free	
15 March 2019	MF	(Norway)	Harmeet Singh	Sarpsborg 08	Undisclosed	
26 March 2019	FW	(Mexico)	Marco Bueno	Pachuca	Undisclosed	
17 June 2019	FW	(Finland)	Erfan Zeneli		Free	
28 June 2019	FW	(Finland)	Samuel Anini	PK Keski-Uusimaa	Undisclosed	
28 June 2019	FW	(Finland)	Tim Väyrynen	Roda JC Kerkrade	Undisclosed	

=== Loans in ===
Start date	Position	Nationality	Name	From	End date	Ref.
9 November 2018	GK	(Russia)	Maksim Rudakov	Zenit St.Petersburg	31 December 2019	
14 November 2018	MF	(Finland)	Kaan Kairinen	Midtjylland	31 December 2019	
25 February 2019	FW	(Russia)	Ivan Tarasov	Zenit St.Petersburg	31 December 2019	
17 June 2019	MF	(Colombia)	William Parra	Independiente Medellín	31 December 2019	
22 July 2019	DF	(Brazil)	Victor Luiz	Cruzeiro	End of Season	
25 July 2019	FW	(Guinea)	Sekou Camara	Besëlidhja Lezhë	End of Season	
5 August 2019	MF	(Finland)	Petteri Forsell	Miedź Legnica	End of Season	

=== Out ===
Start date	Position	Nationality	Name	To	Fee	Ref.
10 July 2019	DF	(Finland)	Valtteri Vesiaho	TPS	Undisclosed	
17 July 2019	MF	(Finland)	Lassi Lappalainen	Bologna	Undisclosed	
10 December 2019	FW	(Ghana)	Evans Mensah	Al-Duhail	Undisclosed	

=== Loans out ===
Start date	Position	Nationality	Name	To	End date	Ref.
7 January 2019	DF	(Finland)	Kalle Katz	RoPS	31 December 2019	
7 January 2019	FW	(Finland)	Enoch Banza	KPV	31 December 2019	
1 August 2019	MF	(Finland)	Otto Ollikainen	TPS	31 December 2019	
2 August 2019	MF	(Finland)	Kevin Kouassivi-Benissan	RoPS	31 December 2019	
29 August 2019	MF	(Finland)	Julius Tauriainen	Freiburg II	30 June 2020	

=== Released ===
Date	Position	Nationality	Name	Joined	Date
9 November 2018	DF	(Finland)	Ville Jalasto	Kongsvinger	
9 November 2018	DF	(Finland)	Hannu Patronen	HIFK	
9 November 2018	DF	(Finland)	Mikko Sumusalo	Honka	
9 November 2018	MF	(Spain)	Jordan Domínguez	Conquense	30 January 2019
9 November 2018	FW	(Nigeria)	Macauley Chrisantus	Conquense	16 February 2019
4 December 2018†	DF	(Finland)	Juha Pirinen	Tromsø	1 January 2019
31 December 2018	MF	(Ghana)	Anthony Annan	Beitar Jerusalem	5 February 2019
28 June 2019	DF	(Nigeria)	Elderson		
27 November 2019	FW	(Finland)	Akseli Pelvas		
18 December 2019	MF	(Finland)	Sebastian Dahlström	Sheriff Tiraspol	20 January 2020
31 December 2019	GK	(Finland)	Robin Källman		
31 December 2019	GK	(Finland)	Markus Uusitalo	Honka	
31 December 2019	DF	(Brazil)	Rafinha	AC Oulu	29 January 2020
31 December 2019	DF	(Finland)	Samu Laitinen	KPV Kokkola	
31 December 2019	DF	(Nigeria)	Faith Obilor	Sheriff Tiraspol	20 January 2020
31 December 2019	FW	(Finland)	Erfan Zeneli	AC Kajaani	31 May 2020
31 December 2019	FW	(Mexico)	Marco Bueno	Oriente Petrolero	

† Pirinen's move was announced on the above date, but was not active until 1 January 2019.

=== Trial ===
Date From	Date To	Position	Nationality	Name	Last club
21 March 2019		FW	(Mexico)	Marco Bueno	Pachuca

== Friendlies ==
20 January 2019 Friendly	Rangers (Scotland)	3 – 2	(Finland) HJK	Glasgow, Scotland
16:00 EET (UTC+2)	Arfield 28'; Katić 53'; Candeias 75'	Report	Kouassivi-Benissan 30'; Lappalainen 55'	Stadium: Ibrox Stadium

26 January 2019 Friendly	HJK (Finland)	3 – 1	(Sweden) Hammarby	Helsinki, Finland
13:45 EET (UTC+2)	Pelvas 54'; Tarasov 59', 86'	Report	Rodić 52'	Stadium: Talin jalkapallohalli

4 March 2019 Friendly	HJK (Finland)	0 – 3	(Belarus) Shakhtyor Soligorsk	Belek, Turkey
16:30 EET (UTC+2)		Report	Goal

8 March 2019 Friendly	HJK (Finland)	2 – 1	(Ukraine) Obolon-Brovar Kyiv	Antalya, Turkey
16:00 EET (UTC+2)	Elderson 41'; Vertainen 90' (pen.)	Report	48'

16 March 2019 Friendly	HJK	2 – 1	KuPS	Helsinki
17:30 EET (UTC+2)	T.Manga 51' (o.g.); Alho 90+'	Report	Karjalainen 67'	Stadium: Telia 5G -areena

23 March 2019 Friendly	HJK (Finland)	3 – 0	(Estonia) Flora	Helsinki
15:00 EET (UTC+2)	Bueno 40' (pen.); Rafinha 42'; O'Shaughnessy 87'	Report		Stadium: Telia 5G -areena

27 March 2019 Friendly	Zenit-2 St.Petersburg (Russia)	0 – 1	(Finland) HJK	Saint Petersburg
15:45 EET (UTC+2)		Report	11' (pen.)

== Competitions ==
=== Veikkausliiga ===
The 2019 Veikkausliiga season begins on 3 April 2019 and ends on 3 November 2019.

==== Regular season ====
Pos	Team	Pld	W	D	L	GF	GA	GD	Pts	Qualification or relegation (Note: Teams played against each other twice (22 matches) after which the league split in two (top 6 and bottom 6 teams).)
3	FC Honka (O)	27	14	5	8	41	29	+12	47	Qualification for the national Europa League qualification final.
4	Ilves	27	13	8	6	34	25	+9	47	Qualification for the Europa League first qualifying round. (Note: Ilves qualified for the Europa League first qualifying round by winning the 2019 Finnish Cup)
5	HJK	27	9	10	8	33	29	+4	37	Qualification for the national Europa League qualification tournament.
6	IFK Mariehamn	27	9	5	13	31	34	−3	32	Qualification for the national Europa League qualification tournament.
7	HIFK	27	10	9	8	37	34	+3	39	Qualification for the national Europa League qualification tournament.

Source: Veikkausliiga, Soccerway
Rules for classification: 1) Points; 2) Goal difference; 3) Goals scored; 4) Head-to-head points; 5) Head-to-head goal difference; 6) Head-to-head away goals scored; 7) Play-off
(Note: Play-off is only played if need to decide champion, teams for relegation or UEFA competition and will be played on a neutral ground).
(O) Play-off winners

===== Results summary =====
Overall								Home						Away					
Pld	W	D	L	GF	GA	GD	Pts	W	D	L	GF	GA	GD	W	D	L	GF	GA	GD
27	9	10	8	32	28	+4	37	5	6	1	20	10	+10	4	4	7	12	18	−6

Last updated: 19 October 2019.
Source: See Results

===== Results by matchday =====
Round	1	2	3	4	5	6	7	8	9	10	11	12	13	14	15	16	17	18	19	20	21	22	23	24	25	26	27
Ground	H	H	A	A	H	A	H	A	H	A	H	A	H	A	H	A	A	H	H	A	A	H	A	A	H	H	A
Result	W	W	D	D	D	L	D	D	D	L	W	W	L	W	D	W	D	D	W	L	W	D	L	L	W	L	L

Updated to match(es) played on 19 October 2019. Source: See Results
A = Away; H = Home; W = Win; D = Draw; L = Loss

===== Results =====
3 April 2019 1	HJK	2 – 1	Inter Turku	Helsinki
18:30 EEST (UTC+3)	Bueno (yellow card) 31'; Mensah 66', 77' (yellow card) 67'	Report	Ojala 74'; Muñiz (yellow card) 79'	Stadium: Telia 5G -areena Attendance: 7,111; Referee: Petri Viljanen

8 April 2019 2	HJK	2 – 1	IFK Mariehamn	Helsinki
18:30 EEST (UTC+3)	Alho (yellow card) 67'; O'Shaughnessy 89'; Dahlström 90+3'	Report	Murnane (yellow card) 23'; Backaliden (yellow card) 48'; M'Boma 68'; Crawford (yellow card) 70'; Sid (yellow card) 90+1'	Stadium: Telia 5G -areena Attendance: 3,242; Referee: Mattias Gestranius

13 April 2019 3	KuPS	0 – 0	HJK	Kuopio
17:00 EEST (UTC+3)	Saxman (yellow card) 24'; Diallo (yellow card) 40'	Report	Dahlström (yellow card) 44'	Stadium: Kuopio Football Stadium; Attendance: 2,347; Referee: Oskari Hämäläinen

18 April 2019 4	SJK	0 – 0	HJK	Seinäjoki
18:30 EEST (UTC+3)	Oliynyk (yellow card) 9'; Yaghoubi (yellow card) 61'; Atakayi (yellow card) 71'; Hatakka (yellow card) 88'	Report	Singh (yellow card) 88'; Tarasov (yellow card) 88'	Stadium: OmaSP Stadion; Attendance: 3,671; Referee: Jani Laaksonen

23 April 2019 5	HJK	1 – 1	HIFK	Helsinki
18:30 EEST (UTC+3)	Dahlström (yellow card) 22'; Pelvas 49'	Report	Tiquinho 65'; Dunsby (yellow card) 80'; Patronen (yellow card) 83'	Stadium: Telia 5G -areena Attendance: 10,251; Referee: Jari Järvinen

29 April 2019 6	Inter Turku	4 – 1	HJK	Turku
18:30 EEST (UTC+3)	Furuholm 10', 19'; Markkula (yellow card) 23'; Valenčič (yellow card) 30'; Kuningas (yellow card) 36'; Tenho (yellow card) 45'; Hämäläinen 49'; Kamy 63'	Report	Elderson 2'; Kairinen (yellow card) 31'; Obilor (red card) 36'; Dahlström (yellow card) 36'	Stadium: Veritas Stadion; Attendance: 2,914; Referee: Mattias Gestranius

3 May 2019 7	HJK	0 – 0	Ilves	Helsinki
18:30 EEST (UTC+3)	Alho (yellow card) 37'	Report	Ala-Myllymäki (yellow card) 63'; Järvinen (yellow card) 82'; Aspegren (yellow card) 88'	Stadium: Telia 5G -areena Attendance: 5,117; Referee: Jari Järvinen

7 May 2019 8	VPS	1 – 1	HJK	Vaasa
18:30 EEST (UTC+3)	Auvinen (yellow card) 45+1'; Ojamaa 90+5'	Report	Singh (yellow card) 23'; Kairinen (yellow card) 42' (yellow-red card) 82'; Lappalainen 55'; Dahlström (yellow card) 74'; Elderson (red card) 88'	Stadium: Hietalahti Stadium; Attendance: 1,872; Referee: Atte Jussila

11 May 2019 9	HJK	2 – 2	SJK	Helsinki
15:00 EEST (UTC+3)	Singh (yellow card) 34'; Nadson 44' (o.g.); Alho (yellow card) 80'; Lappalainen 90+1'	Report	Yaghoubi (yellow card) 37'; Hetemaj 60'; Lautamaja (yellow card) 67'; Atakayi 82'	Stadium: Telia 5G -areena Attendance: 3,392; Referee: Mattias Gestranius

20 May 2019 10	Lahti	3 – 0	HJK	Lahti
18:30 EEST (UTC+3)	Törnros 12', 50'; Etock 24'; Viitikko (yellow card) 31'	Report	Rafinha (yellow card) 58'	Stadium: Lahti Stadium; Attendance: 3,454; Referee: Jani Laaksonen

26 May 2019 11	HJK	3 – 1	KPV	Helsinki
18:30 EEST (UTC+3)	Elderson 19'; Riski 23'; Tarasov (yellow card) 72'; Rafinha 80'	Report	Roiha (yellow card) 9'; Heiermann (yellow card) 52'; Shaze (yellow card) 61'; Helmke 76'	Stadium: Telia 5G -areena Attendance: 3,252; Referee: Joni Hyytiä

31 May 2019 12	RoPS	0 – 1	HJK	Rovaniemi
18:30 EEST (UTC+3)	Agnaldo (yellow card) 74'	Report	Riski (yellow card) 32' (goal) 87'; Dahlström (yellow card) 72'	Stadium: Rovaniemen keskuskenttä Attendance: 1,596; Referee: Ville Nevalainen

19 June 2019 13	HJK	0 – 1	Honka	Helsinki
18:30 EEST (UTC+3)	Alho (yellow card) 55'; Mensah (yellow card) 74' (yellow-red card) 90+3'; Rafinha (yellow card) 78'; Zeneli (yellow card) 90+1'	Report	Hakola 79'; Perovuo (yellow card) 82'; Savage (yellow card) 88'	Stadium: Telia 5G -areena Attendance: 7,822; Referee: Jari Järvinen

25 June 2019 14	IFK Mariehamn	0 – 2	HJK	Mariehamn
18:00 EEST (UTC+3)	M'Boma (yellow card) 38'; Crawford (yellow card) 65'; Sjöroos (yellow card) 89'	Report	Väänänen (yellow card) 3'; Lappalainen 24'; Riski (yellow card) 43' (goal) 85'	Stadium: Wiklöf Holding Arena; Attendance: 1,405; Referee: Mattias Gestranius

29 June 2019 15	HJK	1 – 1	KuPS	Helsinki
17:00 EEST (UTC+3)	Mensah 58'; Zeneli (yellow card) 87'	Report	Thiaw (yellow card) 55'; Rangel 82'	Stadium: Telia 5G -areena Attendance: 4,127; Referee: Petri Viljanen

4 July 2019 16	HIFK	0 – 2	HJK	Helsinki
18:30 EEST (UTC+3)	Bäckman (yellow card) 36'; Kuqi (yellow card) 82'; Toró (yellow card) 90+5'	Report	Kairinen 9'; Dahlström 32' (yellow card) 36'; Alho (yellow card) 90'; Vertainen (yellow card) 90+5'	Stadium: Telia 5G -areena Attendance: 10,256; Referee: Jari Järvinen

20 July 2019 17	Ilves	1 – 1	HJK	Tampere
17:00 EEST (UTC+3)	Mensah (yellow card) 68'; Ala-Myllymäki 90+3' (pen.)	Report	Parra (yellow card) 30'; Riski 55'; Alho (yellow card) 86'; Väänänen (yellow card) 90'; Peiponen (yellow card) 90+1'; Rafinha (yellow card) 90+1'	Stadium: Tammelan Stadion; Attendance: 5,050; Referee: Ville Nevalainen

27 July 2019 18	HJK	1 – 1	VPS	Helsinki
17:00 EEST (UTC+3)	Vertainen (yellow card) 45+2'; Tarasov (yellow card) 49'; Väyrynen 54'	Report	Engström (yellow card) 26'; Ebwelle 45+2' (pen.); Voutilainen (yellow card) 50'; Lähde (yellow card) 90'; Lahti (yellow card) 90+4'	Stadium: Telia 5G -areena Attendance: 3,002; Referee: Mattias Gestranius

10 August 2019 19	HJK	4 – 0	Lahti	Helsinki
17:00 EEST (UTC+3)	Riski 18', 45'; Forsell 32'; Mensah 47' (yellow card) 74'	Report	Coubronne (yellow card) 42'; Amione (yellow card) 74'	Stadium: Telia 5G -areena Attendance: 4,396; Referee: Joni Hyytiä

17 August 2019 20	KPV	1 – 2	HJK	Kokkola
17:00 EEST (UTC+3)	Memolla 40'; Yartey 77'	Report	Väyrynen 71'; Mensah (yellow card) 90+1'	Stadium: Kokkolan Keskuskenttä; Attendance: 3,018; Referee: Petri Viljanen

24 August 2019 21	Honka	0 – 1	HJK	Espoo
15:00 EEST (UTC+3)	Hervás (yellow card) 61'	Report	Luiz (yellow card) 57'; O'Shaughnessy 62'	Stadium: Tapiolan Urheilupuisto; Attendance: 4,219; Referee: Mattias Gestranius

1 September 2019 22	HJK	2 – 2	RoPS	Helsinki
18:30 EEST (UTC+3)	Riski 4'; Zeneli (yellow card) 38'; Dahlström (yellow card) 45'; Toivomäki (yellow card) 57'; Obilor (yellow card) 65'; Vertainen 73'; Väänänen (yellow card) 85'	Report	Muinonen 24'; Lingman 59'; Sissoko (yellow card) 63'	Stadium: Telia 5G -areena Attendance: 7,931; Referee: Antti Munukka

15 September 2019 23	KuPS	1 – 0	HJK	Kuopio
18:30 EEST (UTC+3)	Purje 36'; Pennanen (yellow card) 89'	Report	O'Shaughnessy (yellow card) 15'; Rafinha (yellow card) 38'; Vertainen (yellow card) 85'	Stadium: Kuopio Football Stadium; Attendance: 2,234; Referee: Joni Hyytiä

21 September 2019 24	Honka	3 – 1	HJK	Espoo
13:00 EEST (UTC+3)	Baah (yellow card) 8'; Rasimus (yellow card) 41'; Kaufmann (yellow card) 45'; Aalto 63'; Sumusalo 66'; Savage 85'	Report	Kairinen 32'	Stadium: Tapiolan Urheilupuisto; Attendance: 3,192; Referee: Antti Munukka

28 September 2019 25	HJK	3 – 0	IFK Mariehamn	Helsinki
18:30 EEST (UTC+3)	Tarasov (yellow card) 24'; Mensah 54', 68'; Parra 90+3'	Report	Murnane (yellow card) 90+3'	Stadium: Telia 5G -areena Attendance: 2,137; Referee: Petri Viljanen

6 October 2019 26	HJK	0 – 1	Inter Turku	Helsinki
16:00 EEST (UTC+3)	Alho (yellow card) 70'; Forsell (yellow card) 79'; Väyrynen (yellow card) 83'; Obilor (yellow card) 90+4'	Report	Valenčič 49'	Stadium: Telia 5G -areena Attendance: 3,317; Referee: Mohammad Al Emara

19 October 2019 27	Ilves	2 – 1	HJK	Tampere
15:00 EEST (UTC+3)	Siira (yellow card) 20'; Jair 47' (pen.); Hilander (yellow card) 59'; Fofana 64'	Report	Vertainen 3'; Väyrynen (yellow card) 39'	Stadium: Tammelan Stadion; Referee: Petri Viljanen

==== European Playoff ====
23 October 2019	HJK	2 – 2 (4 – 1 p)	Lahti	Helsinki
18:30 EEST (UTC+3)	Forsell 33' (pen.); Mensah 37'; Väyrynen (yellow card) 69'; Obilor (yellow card) 109'; Tarasov (yellow card) 115'	Report	Amione (yellow card) 31'; Josu 68' (pen.); Assehnoun 78'	Stadium: Telia 5G -areena Attendance: 2,097; Referee: Mattias Gestranius
	Penalties
	Väyrynen (penalty scored); Zeneli (penalty scored); Rafinha (penalty scored); O'Shaughnessy (penalty scored)		(penalty scored) Penninkangas; (penalty missed) Lagerblom; (penalty missed) Lepistu

27 October 2019	HJK	1 – 2 (a.e.t.)	IFK Mariehamn	Helsinki
18:30 EEST (UTC+3)	Parra 16'; Zeneli (yellow card) 121'	Report	M'Boma 68' (yellow card) 90'; Ketting 110'; Murnane (yellow card) 120'	Stadium: Telia 5G -areena Attendance: 997; Referee: Antti Munukka

=== Finnish Cup ===
==== Sixth Round ====
Team	Pld	W	D	L	GF	GA	GD	Pts
FC Honka	5	3	1	1	7	4	+3	10
Inter Turku	5	3	0	2	7	6	+1	9
FC Lahti	5	3	0	2	6	7	−1	9
IFK Mariehamn	5	2	2	1	7	4	+3	8
HJK	5	2	1	2	9	7	+2	7
HIFK	5	0	0	5	3	11	−8	0

Source: Finnish Football Association

29 January 2019 1	HJK	1 – 0	HIFK	Helsinki
17:00 EET (UTC+2)	Riski 32'; Toivomäki (yellow card) 55'; Obilor (yellow card) 72'	Report		Stadium: Tali halli tekonurmi Attendance: 500; Referee: Mohammad Al Emara

2 February 2019 2	HJK	2 – 2	IFK Mariehamn	Helsinki
14:00 EET (UTC+2)	Vahtera 24'; Pelvas 78'	Report	Lönn 39'; Murnane 56'	Stadium: Tali halli tekonurmi Attendance: 329; Referee: Antti Munukka

9 February 2019 3	Inter Turku	1 – 0	HJK	Turku
13:00 EET (UTC+2)	Kuningas 3'	Report	Rafinha (yellow card) 32'; Riski (yellow card) 40'; Vertainen (yellow card) 74'; Vesiaho (yellow card) 77'; O.Ollikainen (yellow card) 90+2'	Stadium: Javenture-Areena; Attendance: 238; Referee: Joni Hyytiä

19 February 2019 4	HJK	2 – 3	Honka	Helsinki
17:00 EET (UTC+2)	Riski 44'; Vahtera 55'	Report	Tammilehto (yellow card) 60'; Martín 78'; Hakola 82'; Ivanov 89'	Stadium: Tali halli tekonurmi Attendance: 553; Referee: Antti Munukka

23 February 2019 5	Lahti	1 – 4	HJK	Lahti
14:00 EET (UTC+2)	Rakovsky (yellow card) 87'; Lampinen 90+1'; Jäntti (yellow card) 90+2'	Report	Vertainen 32'; Lappalainen 41'; Kairinen 52'; Dahlström 82'; Riski (yellow card) 87'; Peiponen (yellow card) 87'	Stadium: Mukkulan halli Attendance: 1 Referee: Jari Järvinen

=== UEFA Champions League ===
==== Qualifying rounds ====
9 July 2019 First qualifying round 1st leg	HJK (Finland)	3 – 0	(Faroe Islands) HB Tórshavn	Helsinki, Finland
19:00 EEST (UTC+3)	Lappalainen 21', 66'; Obilor (yellow card) 14' (yellow-red card) 30'; O'Shaughnessy 42'	Report	M.Egilsson (yellow card) 41'; D.Soylu (yellow card) 61'; J.Davidsen (yellow card) 86'	Stadium: Telia 5G -areena Attendance: 4,719; Referee: Giorgi Kruashvili (Georgia)

16 July 2019 First qualifying round 2nd leg	HB Tórshavn (Faroe Islands)	2 – 2 (2 – 5 agg.)	(Finland) HJK	Tórshavn, Faroe Islands
21:00 EEST (UTC+3)	J.Davidsen (yellow card) 15'; Pingel 17'; Andersen (yellow card) 43' (goal) 56'; P.Petersen (yellow card) 45'; Samuelsen (yellow card) 75'	Report	Vertainen (yellow card) 5'; S.Väänänen (yellow card) 58'; Riski 60', 77'; O'Shaughnessy (yellow card) 90'	Stadium: Gundadalur; Attendance: 620; Referee: Georgios Kominis (Greece)

24 July 2019 Second qualifying round 1st leg	Red Star Belgrade (Serbia)	2 – 0	(Finland) HJK	Belgrade, Serbia
21:45 EEST (UTC+3)	Boakye 27'; Stojković (yellow card) 28'; Rodić (yellow card) 58'; Pavkov 90'	Report	Kairinen (yellow card) 39'	Stadium: Red Star Stadium; Attendance: 36,289; Referee: Paweł Gil (Poland)

31 July 2019 Second qualifying round 2nd leg	HJK (Finland)	2 – 1 (2 – 3 agg.)	(Serbia) Red Star Belgrade	Helsinki, Finland
19:00 EEST (UTC+3)	Alho (yellow card) 15'; Dahlström 46'; Riski 90+2'	Report	Jovančić 56'; Pavkov (yellow card) 78'	Stadium: Telia 5G -areena Attendance: 9,107; Referee: Alain Bieri (Switzerland)

=== UEFA Europa League ===
==== Qualifying rounds ====
6 August 2019 Third qualifying round 1st leg	Riga FC (Latvia)	1 – 1	(Finland) HJK	Riga, Latvia
19:00 EEST (UTC+3)	A.Pētersons (yellow card) 44'; Roger (yellow card) 45'; Biliński 81'	Report	Väyrynen 7'; Parra (yellow card) 48'; Riski (yellow card) 54'	Stadium: Daugava Stadium; Attendance: 3,468; Referee: Kirill Levnikov (Russia)
Note: Riga played their third qualifying round home match at Daugava Stadium, Riga, instead of their regular stadium Skonto Stadium, Riga which did not meet UEFA requirements.

15 August 2019 Third qualifying round 2nd leg	HJK (Finland)	2 – 2 (3 – 3 (a) agg.)	(Latvia) Riga FC	Helsinki, Finland
19:00 EEST (UTC+3)	Forsell 5' (yellow card) 61'; Debelko 69' (o.g.)	Report	Debelko 62', 80' (yellow card) 86'; Valerianos (yellow card) 70'	Stadium: Telia 5G -areena Referee: Mohammed Al-Hakim (Sweden)

== Squad statistics ==
As of Match played 27 October 2019

=== Appearances and goals ===
No.	Pos	Nat	Player	Total		Veikkausliiga		Playoffs		Finnish Cup		Champions League		Europa League	
No.	Pos	Nat	Player	Apps	Goals	Apps	Goals	Apps	Goals	Apps	Goals	Apps	Goals	Apps	Goals
1	GK	(Finland) FIN	Markus Uusitalo	1	0	1	0	0	0	0	0	0	0	0	0
3	DF	(Finland) FIN	Henri Toivomäki	27	0	14+3	0	0	0	4+1	0	2+1	0	0+2	0
5	DF	(Finland) FIN	Daniel O'Shaughnessy	30	3	20+3	2	2	0	0	0	3	1	2	0
6	MF	(Norway) NOR	Harmeet Singh	11	0	8+3	0	0	0	0	0	0	0	0	0
7	MF	(Finland) FIN	Eetu Vertainen	29	3	13+9	2	2	0	1+2	1	1+1	0	0	0
8	DF	(Brazil) BRA	Rafinha	37	1	20+4	1	2	0	4+1	0	4	0	2	0
9	FW	(Finland) FIN	Riku Riski	29	12	14+2	7	2	0	5	2	3+1	3	2	0
10	FW	(Mexico) MEX	Marco Bueno	9	0	7+2	0	0	0	0	0	0	0	0	0
11	FW	(Finland) FIN	Akseli Pelvas	14	2	2+6	1	0	0	3+2	1	0+1	0	0	0
13	FW	(Senegal) SEN	Sekou Camara	3	0	1+2	0	0	0	0	0	0	0	0	0
14	MF	(Finland) FIN	Sebastian Dahlström	29	4	21	2	0	0	2	1	3+1	1	1+1	0
15	MF	(Colombia) COL	William Parra	13	2	7	1	2	1	0	0	2	0	2	0
16	DF	(Brazil) BRA	Victor Luiz	5	0	4	0	0	0	0	0	0+1	0	0	0
17	DF	(Finland) FIN	Nikolai Alho	27	0	19	0	2	0	0	0	4	0	2	0
18	DF	(Finland) FIN	Roni Peiponen	14	0	5+3	0	2	0	2+2	0	0	0	0	0
19	FW	(Finland) FIN	Tim Väyrynen	15	3	6+3	2	0+2	0	0	0	0+2	0	2	1
20	FW	(Russia) RUS	Ivan Tarasov	17	0	5+7	0	0+2	0	0	0	2	0	0+1	0
21	MF	(Finland) FIN	Petteri Forsell	12	3	6+2	1	2	1	0	0	0	0	1+1	1
22	MF	(Finland) FIN	Kaan Kairinen	34	3	20+1	2	2	0	5	1	4	0	2	0
24	FW	(Finland) FIN	Lassi Lappalainen	23	6	15+1	3	0	0	5	1	1+1	2	0	0
27	MF	(Finland) FIN	Kevin Kouassivi-Benissan	15	0	4+4	0	0	0	4+1	0	1+1	0	0	0
30	FW	(Finland) FIN	Joonas Vahtera	12	2	2+5	0	0	0	5	2	0	0	0	0
32	DF	(Nigeria) NGR	Faith Obilor	32	0	20	0	2	0	5	0	3	0	2	0
33	DF	(Finland) FIN	Samu Laitinen	4	0	0+1	0	0	0	1+2	0	0	0	0	0
50	MF	(Finland) FIN	Santeri Väänänen	13	0	6+3	0	0	0	0+1	0	2+1	0	0	0
67	MF	(Finland) FIN	Matti Peltola	1	0	1	0	0	0	0	0	0	0	0	0
77	FW	(Ghana) GHA	Evans Mensah	28	7	13+5	6	0+2	1	0+2	0	4	0	2	0
80	FW	(Finland) FIN	Erfan Zeneli	11	0	3+4	0	0+2	0	0	0	1	0	0+1	0
88	GK	(Russia) RUS	Maksim Rudakov	38	0	25	0	2	0	5	0	4	0	2	0
Players from Klubi-04 who appeared:
Players away from the club on loan:
37	MF	(Finland) FIN	Julius Tauriainen	2	0	0	0	0	0	0+2	0	0	0	0	0
61	MF	(Finland) FIN	Otto Ollikainen	4	0	0	0	0	0	3+1	0	0	0	0	0
Players who left HJK during the season:
2	DF	(Nigeria) NGR	Elderson	5	2	5	2	0	0	0	0	0	0	0	0
25	DF	(Finland) FIN	Valtteri Vesiaho	4	0	0	0	0	0	1+3	0	0	0	0	0

=== Goal scorers ===
Place	Position	Nation	Number	Name	Veikkausliiga	Playoffs	Finnish Cup	Champions League	Europa League	Total
1	FW	(Finland)	9	Riku Riski	7	0	2	3	0	12
2	FW	(Ghana)	77	Evans Mensah	6	1	0	0	0	7
3	FW	(Finland)	24	Lassi Lappalainen	3	0	1	2	0	6
4	MF	(Finland)	14	Sebastian Dahlström	2	0	1	1	0	4
5	MF	(Finland)	22	Kaan Kairinen	2	0	1	0	0	3
5	FW	(Finland)	7	Eetu Vertainen	2	0	1	0	0	3
5	DF	(Finland)	5	Daniel O'Shaughnessy	2	0	0	1	0	3
5	FW	(Finland)	19	Tim Väyrynen	2	0	0	0	1	3
5	MF	(Finland)	21	Petteri Forsell	1	1	0	0	1	3
10	DF	(Nigeria)	2	Elderson	2	0	0	0	0	2
10	FW	(Colombia)	15	William Parra	1	1	0	0	0	2
10	FW	(Finland)	11	Akseli Pelvas	1	0	1	0	0	2
10	FW	(Finland)	30	Joonas Vahtera	0	0	2	0	0	2
10				Own goal	1	0	0	0	1	2
15	DF	(Brazil)	8	Rafinha	1	0	0	0	0	1
TOTALS					32	3	9	7	3	52

=== Disciplinary record ===
Number	Nation	Position	Name	Veikkausliiga		Playoffs		Finnish Cup		Champions League		Europa League		Total	
Number	Nation	Position	Name	Yellow card	Red card	Yellow card	Red card	Yellow card	Red card	Yellow card	Red card	Yellow card	Red card	Yellow card	Red card
3	(Finland)	DF	Henri Toivomäki	1	0	0	0	1	0	0	0	0	0	2	0
5	(Finland)	DF	Daniel O'Shaughnessy	1	0	0	0	0	0	1	0	0	0	2	0
6	(Norway)	MF	Harmeet Singh	3	0	0	0	0	0	0	0	0	0	3	0
7	(Finland)	FW	Eetu Vertainen	3	0	0	0	1	0	1	0	0	0	5	0
8	(Brazil)	DF	Rafinha	4	0	0	0	1	0	0	0	0	0	5	0
9	(Finland)	FW	Riku Riski	2	0	0	0	2	0	0	0	1	0	5	0
10	(Mexico)	FW	Marco Bueno	1	0	0	0	0	0	0	0	0	0	1	0
14	(Finland)	MF	Sebastian Dahlström	7	0	0	0	0	0	0	0	0	0	7	0
15	(Colombia)	MF	William Parra	1	0	0	0	0	0	0	0	1	0	2	0
16	(Brazil)	DF	Victor Luiz	1	0	0	0	0	0	0	0	0	0	1	0
17	(Finland)	DF	Nikolai Alho	6	0	0	0	0	0	1	0	0	0	7	0
18	(Finland)	DF	Roni Peiponen	1	0	0	0	1	0	0	0	0	0	2	0
19	(Finland)	FW	Tim Väyrynen	1	0	1	0	0	0	0	0	0	0	2	0
20	(Russia)	FW	Ivan Tarasov	4	0	1	0	0	0	0	0	0	0	5	0
21	(Finland)	MF	Petteri Forsell	0	0	0	0	0	0	0	0	1	0	1	0
22	(Finland)	MF	Kaan Kairinen	3	1	0	0	0	0	1	0	0	0	4	1
32	(Nigeria)	DF	Faith Obilor	1	1	1	0	1	0	2	1	0	0	5	2
50	(Finland)	MF	Santeri Väänänen	3	0	0	0	0	0	1	0	0	0	4	0
77	(Ghana)	FW	Evans Mensah	5	1	0	0	0	0	0	0	0	0	5	1
80	(Finland)	FW	Erfan Zeneli	3	0	1	0	0	0	0	0	0	0	4	0
Players away on loan:
61	(Finland)	MF	Otto Ollikainen	0	0	0	0	1	0	0	0	0	0	1	0
Players who left HJK during the season:
2	(Nigeria)	DF	Elderson	0	1	0	0	0	0	0	0	0	0	0	1
25	(Finland)	MF	Valtteri Vesiaho	0	0	0	0	1	0	0	0	0	0	1	0
TOTALS				51	4	4	0	9	0	7	1	3	0	74	5
