= 2016 SJK season =

SJK
2016 season
- Chairman: Raimo Sarajärvi
- Manager: Simo Valakari
- Stadium: OmaSP Stadion
- Veikkausliiga: 3rd
- Finnish Cup: Champions
- League Cup: Runners-Up
- UEFA Champions League: Second qualifying round vs BATE Borisov
- Top goalscorer: League: Roope Riski (13); All: Roope Riski (22)
Home colours	Away colours

The 2016 season is Seinäjoen Jalkapallokerho's 9th competitive season, and third in the Veikkausliiga. SJK where defending champions, having won the 2015 title, and will enter the UEFA Champions League for the first time.

== Squad ==
As of 29 August 2016

Note: Flags indicate national team as defined under FIFA eligibility rules; some limited exceptions apply. Players may hold more than one non-FIFA nationality.

No.	Pos.	Nation	Player
1	GK	FIN	Jere Koponen
2	DF	SEN	El-Hadji Kane
3	DF	FIN	Juhani Ojala
4	DF	WAL	Richie Dorman
5	DF	FIN	Henri Aalto
6	MF	FIN	Matej Hradecky
7	DF	FIN	Timo Tahvanainen
8	MF	FIN	Johannes Laaksonen
9	MF	FIN	Jussi Vasara
10	FW	ENG	Billy Ions (loan from PS Kemi)
11	FW	CMR	Tuco
13	FW	FIN	Roope Riski
14	FW	FIN	Toni Lehtinen

No.	Pos.	Nation	Player
15	MF	FIN	Matti Klinga
17	DF	FIN	Teemu Penninkangas
18	DF	FIN	Jarkko Hurme
19	FW	FIN	Youness Rahimi
21	DF	AND	Marc Vales
24	DF	ESP	Aimar
27	FW	FIN	Aleksis Lehtonen
33	GK	EST	Mihkel Aksalu
35	GK	FIN	Paavo Valakari
53	DF	FIN	Joona Ala-Hukkala
58	MF	FIN	Mehmet Hetemaj
63	MF	FIN	Arttu Aromaa

=== Available youth players ===
Note: Flags indicate national team as defined under FIFA eligibility rules; some limited exceptions apply. Players may hold more than one non-FIFA nationality.

No.	Pos.	Nation	Player
—	DF	FIN	Nicolas Kotamäki
—	MF	FIN	Aatu Kujanpää
—	MF	FIN	Matti Lähde

No.	Pos.	Nation	Player
—	MF	FIN	Emil Lidman
—	FW	FIN	Joonas Lepistö
—	FW	FIN	Aleksi Pöntinen

=== Out on loan ===
Note: Flags indicate national team as defined under FIFA eligibility rules; some limited exceptions apply. Players may hold more than one non-FIFA nationality.

No.	Pos.	Nation	Player
25	FW	FIN	Elias Ahde (at Jazz)
26	MF	FIN	Jesse Sarajärvi (at Haka)

== Transfers ==
=== Winter ===
In: Note: Flags indicate national team as defined under FIFA eligibility rules; some limited exceptions apply. Players may hold more than one non-FIFA nationality.

No.	Pos.	Nation	Player
2	DF	FIN	Tapio Heikkilä (from (Finland) HJK)
2	DF	SEN	El-Hadji Kane (from (Spain) RCD Mallorca)
6	MF	FIN	Matej Hradecky (from (Finland) TPS)
10	MF	FIN	Alexei Eremenko (from (Finland) Jaro)
13	FW	FIN	Roope Riski (from (Norway) Haugesund, previously on loan)
16	FW	EST	Tarmo Kink (from (Estonia) Levadia)
18	DF	FIN	Jarkko Hurme (from (Norway) Odd)
19	FW	FIN	Youness Rahimi (from (Finland) HIFK)
27	FW	FIN	Aleksis Lehtonen (from (Finland) JJK)
35	DF	CIV	Abdoulaye Méïté

Out: Note: Flags indicate national team as defined under FIFA eligibility rules; some limited exceptions apply. Players may hold more than one non-FIFA nationality.

No.	Pos.	Nation	Player
2	DF	FIN	Tapio Heikkilä (to (Norway) Start)
5	DF	SRB	Pavle Milosavljević (to (Finland) Ilves)
10	MF	ENG	Wayne Brown
15	DF	SRB	Željko Savić (to (Finland) PS Kemi Kings)
16	FW	FIN	Akseli Pelvas (to (Sweden) Falkenberg)
20	MF	FIN	Marco Matrone (to (Finland) Ilves)
21	FW	BIH	Bahrudin Atajić (to (Lithuania) Žalgiris)
25	FW	FIN	Elias Ahde (loan to (Finland) FC Jazz)
27	DF	CIV	Cédric Gogoua (to (Serbia) Partizan)
28	MF	BRA	Allan (loan return to (England) Liverpool)

Trial: Note: Flags indicate national team as defined under FIFA eligibility rules; some limited exceptions apply. Players may hold more than one non-FIFA nationality.

No.	Pos.	Nation	Player
—	MF	JPN	Aria Jasuru Hasegawa

=== Summer ===
In: Note: Flags indicate national team as defined under FIFA eligibility rules; some limited exceptions apply. Players may hold more than one non-FIFA nationality.

No.	Pos.	Nation	Player
3	DF	NGR	Abonima Izuegbu
3	DF	FIN	Juhani Ojala (from (Russia) Terek Grozny)
10	FW	ENG	Billy Ions (loan from (Finland) PS Kemi)
21	DF	AND	Marc Vales (from (Spain) L'Hospitalet)
24	DF	ESP	Aimar (from (Spain) Llagostera)

Out: Note: Flags indicate national team as defined under FIFA eligibility rules; some limited exceptions apply. Players may hold more than one non-FIFA nationality.

No.	Pos.	Nation	Player
3	DF	NGR	Abonima Izuegbu
10	MF	FIN	Alexei Eremenko
16	FW	EST	Tarmo Kink (to (Hungary) Mezőkövesd-Zsóry)
26	MF	FIN	Jesse Sarajärvi (loan to (Finland) Haka)
35	DF	CIV	Abdoulaye Méïté

== Friendlies ==
6 February 2016	Aalesunds (Norway)	2 – 1	(Finland) SJK	Ålesund
17:00 EET (UTC+2)	Marlinho 17'; Larsen 28'	Report	Kink 20'	Stadium: Color Line Stadion

== Competitions ==
=== Veikkausliiga ===
==== League table ====
Pos	Team	Pld	W	D	L	GF	GA	GD	Pts	Qualification or relegation
1	IFK Mariehamn (C)	33	17	10	6	40	25	+15	61	Qualification for the Champions League second qualifying round
2	HJK	33	16	10	7	52	36	+16	58	Qualification for the Europa League first qualifying round (Note: SJK qualified for the Europa League first qualifying round by winning the 2016 Finnish Cup.)
3	SJK	33	17	6	10	49	36	+13	57	Qualification for the Europa League first qualifying round
4	VPS	33	15	8	10	36	27	+9	53	Qualification for the Europa League first qualifying round
5	Ilves	33	15	7	11	36	35	+1	52	

Source: Veikkausliiga (in Finnish), Soccerway
Rules for classification: 1) Points; 2) Goal difference; 3) Goals scored; 4) Head-to-head points; 5) Head-to-head goal difference; 6) Head-to-head away goals scored; 7) Play-off
(Note: Play-off is only played if need to decide champion, teams for relegation or UEFA competition and will be played on a neutral ground).
(C) Champions

==== Results summary ====
Overall								Home						Away					
Pld	W	D	L	GF	GA	GD	Pts	W	D	L	GF	GA	GD	W	D	L	GF	GA	GD
33	17	6	10	48	36	+12	57	13	1	3	31	13	+18	4	5	7	17	23	−6

Last updated: 24 October 2016.
Source: See Results

==== Results by matchday ====
Matchday	1	2	3	4	5	6	7	8	9	10	11	12	13	14	15	16	17	18	19	20	21	22	23	24	25	26	27	28	29	30	31	32	33
Ground	A	H	A	H	A	H	A	H	A	H	A	H	A	H	A	A	H	H	A	H	A	H	H	A	H	A	H	A	H	A	H	H	A
Result	L	L	L	L	D	W	L	W	D	W	W	W	L	L	W	L	W	W	D	W	L	W	W	L	W	D	W	W	W	W	D	W	D

Updated to match(es) played on 24 October 2016. Source: See results
A = Away; H = Home; W = Win; D = Draw; L = Loss

==== Results ====
9 April 2016 1	PS Kemi	3 – 0	SJK	Turku
16:00 EEST (UTC+3)	Gilligan (yellow card) 65'; Turpeenniemi (yellow card) 78'	Report	Vasara 20'; T.Penninkangas (yellow card) 68'; Riski 90'	Stadium: Veritas Stadion; Attendance: 415; Referee: Mattias Gestranius

14 April 2016 2	SJK	0 – 1	IFK Mariehamn	Seinäjoki
18:30 EEST (UTC+3)	T.Penninkangas (yellow card) 33'	Report	Orgill 25'; Mantilla (yellow card) 42'	Stadium: Seinäjoen keskuskenttä Attendance: 2,115; Referee: Marko Grönholm

18 April 2016 3	HJK	2 – 1	SJK	Helsinki
18:30 EEST (UTC+3)	Rexhepi (yellow card) 66'; Morelos 69'; Tanaka 74' (yellow card) 87'; L. Lingman (yellow card) 90+3'	Report	T. Penninkangas (yellow card) 10'; Ngueukam 25' (yellow card) 58'	Stadium: Sonera Stadium; Attendance: 5,237; Referee: Mattias Gestranius

24 April 2016 4	SJK	0 – 2	Ilves	Seinäjoki
16:00 EEST (UTC+3)	Méïté (yellow card) 83' (red card) 88'	Report	M.Soisalo (yellow card) 59'; Lahtinen 62' (pen.) (yellow card) 88'; Tendeng 83'	Stadium: Seinäjoen keskuskenttä Attendance: 1,782; Referee: Jani Laaksonen

29 April 2016 5	PK-35 Vantaa	0 – 0	SJK	Vantaa
18:30 EEST (UTC+3)		Report	Kane (yellow card) 61'; T.Penninkangas (yellow card) 64'; Laaksonen (yellow card) 70'	Stadium: Myyrmäen jalkapallostadion Attendance: 1,482; Referee: Dennis Antamo

5 May 2016 6	SJK	1 – 0	Inter Turku	Seinäjoki
14:00 EEST (UTC+3)	Riski 75'	Report	E.Belica (yellow card) 45'; Nyman (yellow card) 59'; Obilor (yellow card) 78'	Stadium: Seinäjoen keskuskenttä Attendance: 2,191; Referee: Jari Järvinen

9 May 2016 7	Lahti	3 – 0	SJK	Lahti
18:00 EEST (UTC+3)	B.Tatar 40'; J.Tuominen 70'; Euller 90+1'	Report	Aalto (yellow card) 31'; Hurme (yellow card) 84'	Stadium: Lahti Stadium; Attendance: 2,568; Referee: Antti Munukka

14 May 2016 8	SJK	2 – 1	HIFK	Seinäjoki
16:00 EEST (UTC+3)	Riski 9'; Vasara (yellow card) 12'; Hurme (yellow card) 22'; Méïté (yellow card) 78'; Kink 89'	Report	Mäkelä 79' (pen.)	Stadium: Seinäjoen keskuskenttä Attendance: 1,387; Referee: Mattias Gestranius

21 May 2016 9	KuPS	0 – 0	SJK	Kuopio
16:00 EEST (UTC+3)		Report	Riski (yellow card) 45+3'; Hradecky (yellow card) 70'	Stadium: Kuopio Football Stadium; Attendance: 905; Referee: Mikko Mörö

25 May 2016 10	SJK	1 – 0	VPS	Seinäjoki
18:30 EEST (UTC+3)	Hurme (yellow card) 75'; Riski 88'	Report	Morrissey (yellow card) 70'; K.Peth (yellow card) 90'	Stadium: Seinäjoen keskuskenttä Attendance: 1,656; Referee: Petri Viljanen

28 May 2016 11	RoPS	2 – 3	SJK	Rovaniemi
16:00 EEST (UTC+3)	R.Taylor 13'; Osei 66'	Report	Méïté (yellow card) 35' (goal) 85'; T.Penninkangas (yellow card) 58'; Riski 64'; Ngueukam (yellow card) 69' (goal) 79'; Laaksonen (yellow card) 90+2'	Stadium: Rovaniemen keskuskenttä Attendance: 2,344; Referee: Mikko Mörö

9 June 2016 12	SJK	1 – 0	PS Kemi	Seinäjoki
18:30 EEST (UTC+3)	Aalto (yellow card) 28'; Ngueukam (yellow card) 37'; Vasara 44'; Laaksonen (yellow card) 59'	Report	Winchester (yellow card) 48'; Muller (yellow card) 72'	Stadium: Seinäjoen keskuskenttä Attendance: 947; Referee: Mikko Mörö

12 June 2016 13	IFK Mariehamn	1 – 0	SJK	Mariehamn
13:30 EEST (UTC+3)	Assis 61'; Lyyski (yellow card) 70'; Petrović (yellow card) 76'	Report	Hurme (yellow card) 17'; Klinga (yellow card) 44'; Dorman (yellow card) 64'	Stadium: Wiklöf Holding Arena; Attendance: 861; Referee: Oskari Hämäläinen

18 June 2016 14	SJK	2 – 3	HJK	Seinäjoki
13:30 EEST (UTC+3)	T.Penninkangas 21'; Hradecky 32'; Hetemaj (yellow card) 69'; Hurme (yellow card) 87'	Report	Morelos 2'; Taiwo (yellow card) 47' (goal) 55'; Tanaka 65'; Alho (yellow card) 77'	Stadium: OmaSP Stadion; Attendance: 5,817; Referee: Ville Nevalainen

28 June 2016 15	Inter Turku	1 – 3	SJK	Turku
18:30 EEST (UTC+3)	Kauppi (yellow card) 58'; Gnabouyou 66'	Report	Hurme 47'; Riski 50', 90+1'; Méïté (yellow card) 72'; Hetemaj (yellow card) 82'	Stadium: Veritas Stadion; Attendance: 2,364; Referee: Mattias Gestranius

2 July 2016 16	Ilves	2 – 1	SJK	Tampere
16:00 EEST (UTC+3)	Ala-Myllymäki 8'; T.Siira 58'	Report	Kink 14'; Hetemaj (yellow card) 27'; Hurme (yellow card) 70'; Tahvanainen (yellow card) 81'	Stadium: Tammelan Stadion; Attendance: 4,075; Referee: Dennis Antamo

8 July 2016 17	SJK	3 – 2	PK-35 Vantaa	Seinäjoki
18:30 EEST (UTC+3)	A.Izuegbu 9'; Riski 22'; Vasara 45+2'; Ngueukam (yellow card) 90+5'	Report	Kuqi 2' (pen.); K.Manev (yellow card) 45+2'; Äijälä 52'; Rasimus (yellow card) 61'; R.Heinonen (yellow card) 67'; Ristola (yellow card) 86'; K.Raimi (yellow card) 90+3'	Stadium: OmaSP Stadion; Attendance: 2,931; Referee: Mattias Gestranius

23 July 2016 18	SJK	4 – 1	Lahti	Seinäjoki
16:00 EEST (UTC+3)	Vasara 9'; Riski 41', 90+1' (pen.); Rahimi 85'	Report	Rafael 14' (yellow card) 64'; B.Tatar (yellow card) 90+1'	Stadium: OmaSP Stadion; Attendance: 3,357; Referee: Jari Järvinen

30 July 2016 19	HIFK	1 – 1	SJK	Helsinki
16:00 EEST (UTC+3)	Salmikivi 19'; Kuusijärvi (yellow card) 37'	Report	Ngueukam 11'; T.Penninkangas (yellow card) 64'	Stadium: Sonera Stadium; Attendance: 3,313; Referee: Marko Grönholm

6 August 2016 20	SJK	1 – 0	KuPS	Seinäjoki
16:00 EEST (UTC+3)	Hetemaj 45'	Report	Salami (yellow card) 22'; Egwuekwe (yellow card) 41'; I.Niskanen (yellow card) 52'	Stadium: OmaSP Stadion; Attendance: 3,578; Referee: Petri Viljanen

10 August 2016 21	VPS	2 – 1	SJK	Vaasa
18:30 EEST (UTC+3)	Lähde (yellow card) 19'; Morrissey 21', 43'; Lahti (yellow card) 90+4'	Report	Hurme (yellow card) 9'; Hetemaj (yellow card) 32'; Lehtinen 75'; Dorman (yellow card) 75'	Stadium: Hietalahti Stadium; Attendance: 5,987; Referee: Jari Järvinen

13 August 2016 22	SJK	3 – 1	RoPS	Seinäjoki
16:00 EEST (UTC+3)	Dorman 4' (yellow card) 64'; Vasara 45+3', 71'; T.Penninkangas (yellow card) 77'	Report	Muinonen 45+2'; Mravec (yellow card) 58'	Stadium: OmaSP Stadion; Attendance: 3,675; Referee: Kalle Mäkinen

20 August 2016 23	SJK	4 – 0	Ilves	Seinäjoki
16:00 EEST (UTC+3)	Riski 8', 30', 90+3' (yellow card) 69'; Vasara 58'; Tahvanainen (yellow card) 71'	Report	Sentamu (yellow card) 77'	Stadium: OmaSP Stadion; Attendance: 3,560; Referee: Miko Mörö

27 August 2016 24	HIFK	3 – 1	SJK	Helsinki
16:00 EEST (UTC+3)	Sihvola 34'; Bäckman 87'; Salmikivi 88'	Report	Aalto (yellow card) 42'; Hurme (yellow card) 49'; Riski 50'	Stadium: Sonera Stadium; Attendance: 3,297; Referee: Oskari Hämäläinen

9 September 2016 25	SJK	1 – 0	Inter Turku	Seinäjoki
18:30 EEST (UTC+3)	Ions 7'; Hetemaj (yellow card) 81'	Report	Obilor (yellow card) 20' (yellow-red card) 82'	Stadium: OmaSP Stadion; Attendance: 4,219; Referee: Oskari Hämäläinen

12 September 2016 26	RoPS	1 – 1	SJK	Rovaniemi
18:30 EEST (UTC+3)	R.Taylor 73' (pen.); Prosa (yellow card) 88'	Report	Ions 90'; Aimar (yellow card) 90+3'	Stadium: Rovaniemen keskuskenttä Attendance: 1,710; Referee: Marko Grönholm

17 September 2016 27	SJK	1 – 0	IFK Mariehamn	Seinäjoki
16:00 EEST (UTC+3)	Vasara 84'	Report	Lyyski (yellow card) 41'	Stadium: Seinäjoen keskuskenttä Attendance: 3,839; Referee: Ville Nevalainen

21 September 2016 28	VPS	1 – 2	SJK	Vaasa
18:30 EEST (UTC+3)	N.Boxall 12' (yellow card) 51'; J.Voutilainen (yellow card) 18'; J.Levänen (yellow card) 88'	Report	Ions 24'; Ngueukam 45+1'; Hurme (yellow card) 75'; Vasara (yellow card) 90'	Stadium: Hietalahti Stadium; Referee: Kalle Mäkinen

28 September 2016 29	SJK	1 – 0	KuPS	Seinäjoki
18:30 EEST (UTC+3)	Hetemaj (yellow card) 36'; Vales (yellow card) 70'; Riski 74' (yellow card) 81'	Report	Diallo (yellow card) 28'; S.Jovović (yellow card) 89'	Stadium: Seinäjoen keskuskenttä Attendance: 3,109; Referee: Dennis Antamo

1 October 2016 30	PS Kemi	1 – 3	SJK	Kemi
15:00 EEST (UTC+3)	Törnros 19' (yellow card) 22'; Valenčič (yellow card) 26'; Veteli (yellow card) 31'	Report	Hurme (yellow card) 43'; Riski 60'; Hradecky 67'; Vasara 69'	Stadium: Sauvosaaren Urheilupuisto; Attendance: 1,722; Referee: Mikka Lähdesmäki

14 October 2016 31	SJK	2 – 2	Lahti	Seinäjoki
18:30 EEST (UTC+3)	Vales (yellow card) 27'; T.Penninkangas 50'; Ions 87'	Report	M.Kuningas 39'; Tammilehto (yellow card) 52'; Osipov 59'; Länsitalo (yellow card) 65'	Stadium: Seinäjoen keskuskenttä Attendance: 4,021; Referee: Ville Nevalainen

17 October 2016 32	SJK	5 – 0	PK-35 Vantaa	Seinäjoki
18:30 EEST (UTC+3)	Riski 35' (pen.); Hradecky 37', 52'; Klinga 42'; Ions 45'	Report		Stadium: Seinäjoen keskuskenttä Attendance: 4,574; Referee: Mikko Mörö

23 October 2016 33	HJK	0 – 0	SJK	Helsinki
15:00 EEST (UTC+3)	Jalasto (yellow card) 56'	Report	Hetemaj (yellow card) 54'; Ojala (yellow card) 58'; Hurme (yellow card) 89'	Stadium: Sonera Stadium; Attendance: 8,752; Referee: Ville Nevalainen

=== Finnish Cup ===
5 April 2016 Fifth Round	PS Kemi	1 – 1 (4 – 5 p)	SJK	Kemi
17:00 EEST (UTC+3)	Ions 116'	Report	Riski 118'	Stadium: CitySport Areena TN; Attendance: 401
	Penalties
	Jovović (penalty scored); Eissele (penalty scored); Räihä (penalty scored); Ions (penalty scored); Veteli (penalty missed); Turpeenniemi (penalty missed)		Eremenko (penalty scored); Riski (penalty scored); Aalto (penalty scored); Klinga (penalty scored); Laaksonen (penalty missed); Rahimi (penalty scored)

21 April 2016 Sixth Round	VPS	1 – 2	SJK	Vaasa
18:15 EEST (UTC+3)	L.Hertsi 36'	Report	Ngueukam 26', 58'; T.Penninkangas (yellow card) 69'	Stadium: Elisa Stadion

15 June 2016 Quarterfinals	PK-35 Vantaa	1 – 3	SJK	Vantaa
18:30 EEST (UTC+3)	Kuqi 21'	Report	Penninkangas 17'; Riski 24'; Ngueukam 90'	Stadium: Myyrmäki Stadion; Attendance: 689

23 June 2016 Semifinals	Haka	1 – 6	SJK	Valkeakoski
18:30 EEST (UTC+3)	Dudu 67' (yellow card) 76'; Tabe (yellow card) 72'	Report	Tahvanainen 13'; Ngueukam 26'; Riski 33'; Hradecky 54'; Rahimi 75'; Klinga 88'	Stadium: Tehtaan kenttä Attendance: 1,265; Referee: Antti Munukka

==== Final ====
24 September 2016	SJK	1 – 1 (a.e.t.) (7 – 6 p)	HJK	Tampere
15:30 (EEST)	Vales (yellow card) 36'; Hetemaj (yellow card) 62'; Aimar (yellow card) 72'; Riski 74'	Report	Morelos 49'	Stadium: Ratina Stadium; Attendance: 2,000; Referee: Jari Järvinen
	Penalties
	Lehtinen (penalty scored); Vales (penalty scored); Hurme (penalty scored); Aimar (penalty missed); Laaksonen (penalty scored); Tuco (penalty scored); Penninkangas (penalty scored); Hetemaj (penalty scored)		(penalty scored) Forssell; (penalty scored) Pelvas; (penalty scored) Morelos; (penalty scored) Rafinha; (penalty missed) Tatomirović; (penalty scored) Dahlström; (penalty scored) Annan; (penalty missed) Jalasto

=== League Cup ===
Pos	Team	Pld	W	D	L	GF	GA	GD	Pts	Qualification
1	SJK	5	4	1	0	6	2	+4	13	Final
2	PS Kemi	5	2	1	2	6	5	+1	7	
3	VPS	5	2	1	2	4	4	0	7	
4	RoPS	5	1	3	1	4	3	+1	6	
5	Ilves	5	1	1	3	3	6	−3	4	
6	KuPS	5	1	1	3	3	6	−3	4	

Updated to match(es) played on 27 February 2015. Source: veikkausliiga.com
Rules for classification: 1) points; 2) goal difference; 3) number of goals scored; 4) head-to-head points; 5) head-to-head goal difference; 6) goals scored in head-to-head

29 January 2016 1	KuPS	0 – 0	SJK	Kuopio
18:30 EET (UTC+2)		Report	Kink (yellow card) 64'	Stadium: Kuopio-halli; Attendance: 1,015; Referee: Ville Nevalainen

10 February 2016 2	SJK	2 – 1	VPS	Seinäjoki
19:15 EET (UTC+2)	Hurme (yellow card) 14'; Ngueukam 56'; Riski 63'	Report	Clennon 12'; Klepczarek (yellow card) 80'	Stadium: Wallsport Areena; Attendance: 482

13 February 2016 3	SJK	1 – 0	PS Kemi Kings	Seinäjoki
14:15 EET (UTC+2)	Kink (yellow card) 42'; Vasara (yellow card) 70'; Riski 90+2'	Report	Kaby (yellow card) 18'; Könönen (yellow card) 66'; S.Jovović (yellow card) 79' (yellow-red card) 84'	Stadium: Wallsport Areena; Attendance: 459

16 February 2016 4	SJK	1 – 0	Ilves	Seinäjoki
17:00 EET (UTC+2)	Ngueukam 57'; J.Sarajärvi (yellow card) 76'	Report	Ala-Myllymäki (yellow card) 17'; Hilska (yellow card) 30'	Stadium: Wallsport Areena; Referee: Marko Grönholm

27 February 2016 5	RoPS	1 – 2	SJK	Oulu
15:00 EET (UTC+2)	M.Saine (yellow card) 21'; J.Hämäläinen (red card) 26'; Okkonen 50' (yellow card) 76'; Pirinen (yellow card) 88'	Report	Riski 27' (pen.), 32'	Stadium: Heinäpään; Attendance: 253; Referee: Ville Nevalainen

==== Final ====
27 March 2016	SJK	0 – 0 (a.e.t.) (3–4 p)	Lahti	Seinajoki
16:00 EET (UTC+2)	Kane (yellow card) 24'; T.Penninkangas (yellow card) 85'	Report		Stadium: Wallsport Areena; Attendance: 487; Referee: D.Antamo
	Penalties
	Eremenko (penalty scored); Rahimi (penalty missed); Riski (penalty scored); Laaksonen (penalty scored); Tahvanainen (penalty missed)		Rafael (penalty scored); J.Tuominen (penalty scored); Multanen (penalty missed); Kärkkäinen (penalty scored); Sesay (penalty scored)

=== UEFA Champions League ===
==== Qualifying stage ====
12 July 2016 Second qualifying round 1st leg	BATE Borisov (Belarus)	2 – 0	(Finland) SJK	Barysaw
21:00 EEST (UTC+3)	Kendysh 32'; Rodionov (yellow card) 43' (goal) 68'	Report	Hetemaj (yellow card) 74'; Hurme (yellow card) 87'	Stadium: Borisov Arena; Referee: Andris Treimanis (Latvia)

19 July 2016 Second qualifying round 2nd leg	SJK (Finland)	2 – 2 (2 – 4 agg.)	(Belarus) BATE Borisov	Seinäjoki
20:00 EEST (UTC+3)	Méïté (yellow card) 3'; Tahvanainen (yellow card) 22'; Ngueukam 44'; Riski 61'	Report	Karnitsky 15'; Ríos 29'	Stadium: OmaSP Stadion; Referee: Bastian Dankert (Germany)

== Squad statistics ==
As of Match played 23 October 2016

=== Appearances and goals ===
No.	Pos	Nat	Player	Total		Veikkausliiga		Finnish Cup		League Cup		Champions League	
No.	Pos	Nat	Player	Apps	Goals	Apps	Goals	Apps	Goals	Apps	Goals	Apps	Goals
1	GK	(Finland) FIN	Jere Koponen	7	0	2	0	3	0	2	0	0	0
2	DF	(Senegal) SEN	El-Hadji Kane	15	0	8	0	1	0	5	0	0+1	0
3	DF	(Finland) FIN	Juhani Ojala	10	0	9	0	1	0	0	0	0	0
4	DF	(Wales) WAL	Richie Dorman	14	1	8+5	1	0+1	0	0	0	0	0
5	DF	(Finland) FIN	Henri Aalto	30	0	22+1	0	3	0	2	0	2	0
6	MF	(Finland) FIN	Matej Hradecky	42	5	28+4	4	4	1	4	0	2	0
7	DF	(Finland) FIN	Timo Tahvanainen	21	1	3+7	0	3	1	6	0	1+1	0
8	MF	(Finland) FIN	Johannes Laaksonen	32	0	16+8	0	2+1	0	3	0	2	0
9	MF	(Finland) FIN	Jussi Vasara	43	8	29+1	8	3+2	0	4+2	0	2	0
10	FW	(England) ENG	Billy Ions	10	5	9+1	5	0	0	0	0	0	0
11	FW	(Cameroon) CMR	Ariel Ngueukam	45	11	23+9	4	5	4	5+1	2	2	1
13	FW	(Finland) FIN	Roope Riski	45	25	33	16	5	4	5	4	2	1
14	FW	(Finland) FIN	Toni Lehtinen	9	1	1+7	1	0+1	0	0	0	0	0
15	MF	(Finland) FIN	Matti Klinga	33	2	21+6	1	4+1	1	0	0	0+1	0
17	DF	(Finland) FIN	Teemu Penninkangas	36	3	26+1	2	4+1	1	2+1	0	1	0
18	DF	(Finland) FIN	Jarkko Hurme	36	1	24+1	1	4	0	5	0	2	0
19	FW	(Finland) FIN	Youness Rahimi	23	2	2+13	1	0+3	1	1+2	0	0+2	0
21	DF	(Andorra) AND	Marc Vales	14	0	12+1	0	1	0	0	0	0	0
24	DF	(Spain) ESP	Aimar	10	0	8+1	0	1	0	0	0	0	0
33	GK	(Estonia) EST	Mihkel Aksalu	39	0	31	0	2	0	4	0	2	0
56	FW	(Finland) FIN	Joonas Lepistö	1	0	0	0	0	0	0+1	0	0	0
58	MF	(Finland) FIN	Mehmet Hetemaj	24	1	16+1	1	3	0	2	0	2	0
63	MF	(Finland) FIN	Arttu Aromaa	4	0	0	0	0	0	1+3	0	0	0
Players away on loan:
25	FW	(Finland) FIN	Elias Ahde	3	0	0	0	0	0	0+2	0	0+1	0
26	MF	(Finland) FIN	Jesse Sarajärvi	11	0	1+5	0	0	0	4+1	0	0	0
Players who left SJK during the season:
2	DF	(Finland) FIN	Tapio Heikkilä	1	0	0	0	0	0	1	0	0	0
3	DF	(Nigeria) NGR	Abonima Izuegbu	4	1	3	1	1	0	0	0	0	0
10	MF	(England) ENG	Wayne Brown	1	0	0	0	0	0	1	0	0	0
10	MF	(Finland) FIN	Alexei Eremenko	12	0	3+2	0	1+1	0	2+3	0	0	0
16	FW	(Estonia) EST	Tarmo Kink	19	2	8+4	2	1+1	0	5	0	0	0
21	MF	(Finland) FIN	Aatu Kujanpää	2	0	0	0	0	0	0+2	0	0	0
35	DF	(Ivory Coast) CIV	Abdoulaye Méïté	25	1	18	1	3	0	2	0	2	0

=== Goal scorers ===
Place	Position	Nation	Number	Name	Veikkausliiga	Finnish Cup	League Cup	Champions League	Total
1	FW	(Finland)	13	Roope Riski	16	4	4	1	25
2	FW	(Cameroon)	11	Ariel Ngueukam	4	4	2	1	11
3	MF	(Finland)	9	Jussi Vasara	8	0	0	0	8
4	FW	(England)	10	Billy Ions	5	0	0	0	5
4	MF	(Finland)	6	Matej Hradecky	4	1	0	0	5
6	DF	(Finland)	17	Teemu Penninkangas	2	1	0	0	3
7	FW	(Estonia)	16	Tarmo Kink	2	0	0	0	2
7	FW	(Finland)	19	Youness Rahimi	1	1	0	0	2
7	MF	(Finland)	15	Matti Klinga	1	1	0	0	2
10	DF	(Ivory Coast)	35	Abdoulaye Méïté	1	0	0	0	1
10	DF	(Finland)	18	Jarkko Hurme	1	0	0	0	1
10	DF	(Nigeria)	3	Abonima Izuegbu	1	0	0	0	1
10	MF	(Finland)	58	Mehmet Hetemaj	1	0	0	0	1
10	FW	(Finland)	14	Toni Lehtinen	1	0	0	0	1
10	DF	(Wales)	4	Richie Dorman	1	0	0	0	1
10	DF	(Finland)	7	Timo Tahvanainen	0	1	0	0	1
TOTALS					49	13	6	2	66

=== Clean sheets ===
Place	Position	Nation	Number	Name	Veikkausliiga	Finnish Cup	League Cup	Champions League	Total
1	GK	(Estonia)	33	Mihkel Aksalu	12	0	2	0	14
2	GK	(Finland)	1	Jere Koponen	0	0	2	0	2
TOTALS					12	0	4	0	16

=== Disciplinary record ===
Number	Nation	Position	Name	Veikkausliiga		Finnish Cup		League Cup		Champions League		Total	
Number	Nation	Position	Name	Yellow card	Red card	Yellow card	Red card	Yellow card	Red card	Yellow card	Red card	Yellow card	Red card
2	(Senegal)	DF	El-Hadji Kane	1	0	0	0	1	0	0	0	2	0
3	(Finland)	DF	Juhani Ojala	1	0	0	0	0	0	0	0	1	0
4	(Wales)	DF	Richie Dorman	3	0	0	0	0	0	0	0	3	0
5	(Finland)	DF	Henri Aalto	3	0	0	0	0	0	0	0	3	0
7	(Finland)	DF	Timo Tahvanainen	2	0	1	0	0	0	1	0	4	0
8	(Finland)	MF	Johannes Laaksonen	3	0	1	0	0	0	0	0	4	0
9	(Finland)	MF	Jussi Vasara	2	0	0	0	1	0	0	0	3	0
11	(Cameroon)	FW	Ariel Ngueukam	4	0	1	0	0	0	0	0	5	0
13	(Finland)	FW	Roope Riski	2	0	0	0	0	0	0	0	2	0
15	(Finland)	MF	Matti Klinga	1	0	0	0	0	0	0	0	1	0
17	(Finland)	DF	Teemu Penninkangas	7	0	1	0	1	0	0	0	9	0
18	(Finland)	DF	Jarkko Hurme	11	0	1	0	1	0	1	0	14	0
21	(Andorra)	DF	Marc Vales	2	0	1	0	0	0	0	0	3	0
24	(Spain)	DF	Aimar	1	0	1	0	0	0	0	0	2	0
26	(Finland)	MF	Jesse Sarajärvi	0	0	0	0	1	0	0	0	1	0
58	(Finland)	MF	Mehmet Hetemaj	7	0	1	0	0	0	1	0	9	0
Players who left SJK during the season:
16	(Estonia)	FW	Tarmo Kink	0	0	0	0	1	0	0	0	1	0
35	(Ivory Coast)	DF	Abdoulaye Méïté	4	1	0	0	0	0	1	0	5	1
TOTALS				54	1	8	0	6	0	4	0	72	1
