= Marc Vales =

Andorran footballer (born 1990)

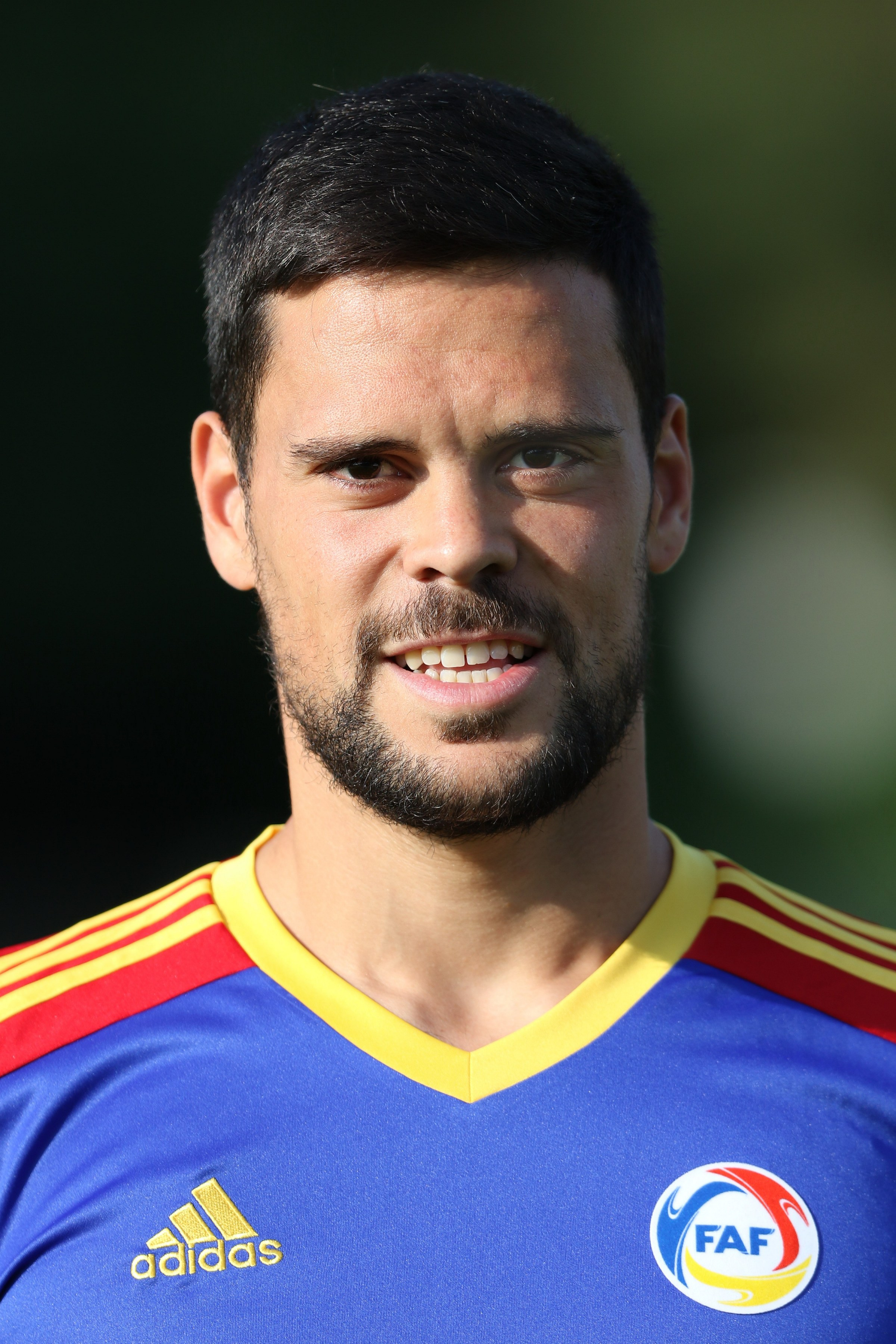
- Vales with Andorra in 2016

Personal information
- Full name: Marc Vales González
- Date of birth: 4 April 1990 (age 36)
- Place of birth: Les Escaldes, Andorra
- Height: 1.84 m (6 ft 1/2 in)
- Positions: Centre-back; defensive midfielder

Team information
- Current team: Europa FC
- Number: 3

Youth career
- Sant Julià

Senior career*
Years	Team	Apps	(Gls)
2006–2007	FC Andorra	18	(0)
2007–2008	Sabadell B		
2008	Ibiza-Eivissa B	13	(1)
2009	Binéfar	12	(1)
2009–2011	Atlético Monzón	58	(7)
2011–2012	Atlético Baleares	19	(2)
2012–2013	Real Madrid C	13	(0)
2014	FC Andorra	6	(1)
2014–2015	Zaragoza B	27	(1)
2015–2016	Hospitalet	5	(0)
2016–2018	SJK	38	(0)
2018–2021	Sandefjord	66	(4)
2022	Kedah Darul Aman	15	(2)
2023	Real Unión	8	(1)
2023–2024	CE Europa	21	(1)
2024–2025	Atlètic Lleida	10	(0)
2025–	Europa FC	17	(2)

International career^{‡}
2008–2011	Andorra U21	4	(0)
2008–	Andorra	107	(5)
- * Club domestic league appearances and goals as of 20:40, 24 September 2026 (UTC) ‡ National team caps and goals as of 21:53, 25 August 2026 (UTC)

Marc Vales González (born 4 April 1990) is an Andorran professional footballer who plays for Gibraltar Football League club Europa FC. Mainly a central defender, he can also play as a defensive midfielder.

== Club career ==
Born in Les Escaldes, Escaldes-Engordany, Vales never competed in higher than Segunda División B during his lengthy spell in Spain, having started playing football with local Sant Julià. Subsequently, he represented FC Andorra (two spells), Sabadell B, Eivissa-Ibiza B, Binéfar and Atlético Monzón.

In the summer of 2011, Vales signed for Atlético Baleares. His first match in the third tier took place on 30 October, and he scored the game's only goal at home against Olímpic de Xàtiva.

Vales spent the vast majority of the following years in the same league – with the exception of a few months in the Tercera División with FC Andorra – with Real Madrid C (who acquired him on a free transfer), Zaragoza B and Hospitalet. On 5 August 2016, he signed with Finnish side SJK until the end of the season, with the option of an additional campaign.

On 9 November 2016, SJK announced that they had agreed a new two-year contract with Vales. On 25 July 2018, he moved to the Norwegian Eliteserien with Sandefjord on a two-and-a-half-year deal.

In January 2022, Vales signed for Malaysian club Kedah Darul Aman. He returned to Spain on 13 February 2023, with the 32-year-old joining Real Unión in the Primera Federación; he changed teams again in the summer, on a contract at Segunda Federación's CE Europa.

Vales moved to the Tercera División with Atlètic Lleida on 20 August 2024. One year later, he joined Gibraltar Football League club Europa FC, making his debut on 12 September in a 2–1 away win against Magpies.

== International career ==
After representing Andorra at youth level, Vales won his first cap with the full side on 26 March 2008 (one month shy of his 18th birthday), playing one minute in a 0–3 friendly home loss to Latvia. He went on to appear in more than 100 internationals.

Vales scored his first goal on 11 October 2019, as the hosts defeated ten-man Moldova 1–0 in the UEFA Euro 2020 qualifiers. On 2 September 2021, he netted twice in a 2–0 home win over San Marino in the 2022 FIFA World Cup qualifying stage.

Vales made his 100th appearance for the country on 10 June 2025, in the 3–0 away loss against Serbia in a 2026 World Cup qualifier.

== Career statistics ==
=== Club ===
As of match played 11 October 2022

Appearances and goals by club, season and competition
Club	Season	League			National Cup		League Cup		Continental		Other		Total	
Club	Season	Division	Apps	Goals	Apps	Goals	Apps	Goals	Apps	Goals	Apps	Goals	Apps	Goals
SJK	2016	Veikkausliiga	13	0	1	0	0	0	0	0	-		14	0
SJK	2017	Veikkausliiga	19	0	9	1	-		2	0	-		30	1
SJK	2018	Veikkausliiga	6	0	1	0	-		-		-		7	0
SJK	Total		38	0	11	0	0	0	2	0	-	-	51	1
Sandefjord	2018	Eliteserien	12	0	0	0	–		–		–		12	0
Sandefjord	2019	First Division	12	0	2	0	–		–		–		14	0
Sandefjord	2020	Eliteserien	24	3	0	0	–		–		–		24	3
Sandefjord	2021	Eliteserien	18	1	2	0	–		–		–		20	1
Sandefjord	Total		66	4	4	0	–	–	–	–	-	-	70	4
Kedah Darul Aman	2022	Malaysia Super League	15	2	0	0	0	0	0	0	–		15	2
Career total			119	6	15	1	0	0	2	0	-	-	136	7

=== International ===
As of match played 7 June 2026

Andorra
Year	Apps	Goals
2008	5	0
2009	7	0
2010	2	0
2011	6	0
2012	4	0
2013	6	0
2014	5	0
2015	3	0
2016	7	0
2017	5	0
2018	7	0
2019	10	1
2020	2	0
2021	10	4
2022	5	0
2023	8	0
2024	5	0
2025	6	0
2026	4	0
Total	107	5

As of match played 12 November 2021. Andorra score listed first, score column indicates score after each Vales goal.

No.	Date	Venue	Opponent	Score	Result	Competition
1.	11 October 2019	Estadi Nacional, Andorra la Vella, Andorra	Moldova	1–0	1–0	UEFA Euro 2020 qualifying
2.	3 June 2021	Estadi Nacional, Andorra la Vella, Andorra	Republic of Ireland	1–0	1–4	Friendly
3.	2 September 2021	Estadi Nacional, Andorra la Vella, Andorra	San Marino	1–0	2–0	2022 FIFA World Cup qualification
4.	2 September 2021	Estadi Nacional, Andorra la Vella, Andorra	San Marino	2–0	2–0	2022 FIFA World Cup qualification
5.	12 November 2021	Estadi Nacional, Andorra la Vella, Andorra	Poland	1–2	1–4	2022 FIFA World Cup qualification
