= Marc García =

Marc García may refer to:

- Marc García (footballer)
- Marc García (basketball)
- Marc García (motorcyclist)
