= Marc García (footballer) =

Andorran footballer

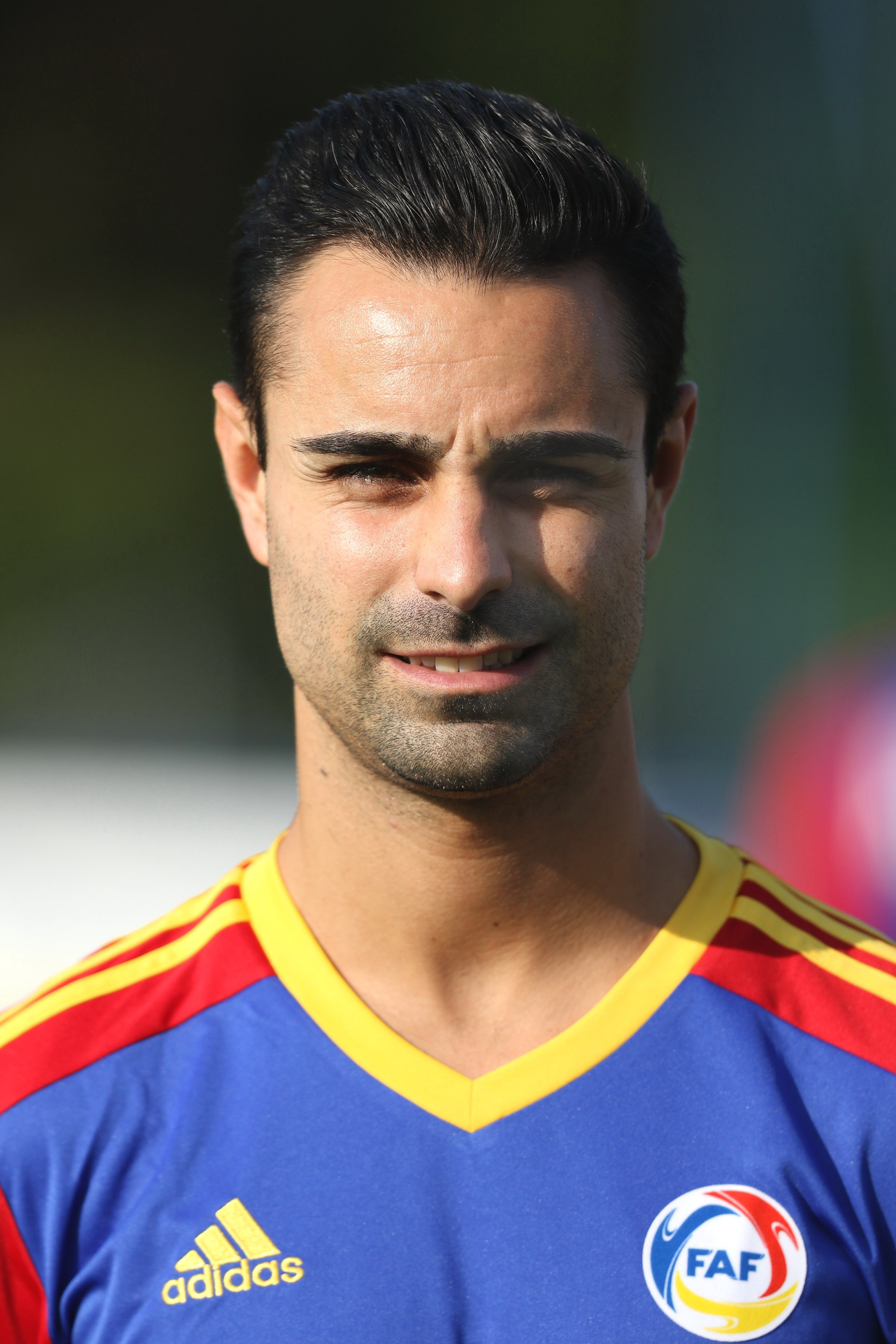
- García with Andorra in 2016

Personal information
- Full name: Marc García Renom
- Date of birth: 21 March 1988 (age 38)
- Place of birth: Andorra la Vella, Andorra
- Height: 1.74 m (5 ft 9 in)
- Position: Left-back

Team information
- Current team: Binéfar

Youth career
- Lleida

Senior career*
Years	Team	Apps	(Gls)
2007–2009	Eivissa B	26	(0)
2009–2010	Fraga	7	(2)
2010–2011	Pomar	27	(1)
2011–2012	Atlético Monzón	29	(0)
2012–2013	Vic	30	(2)
2013–2014	Llagostera	0	(0)
2013	→ Palamós (loan)	5	(0)
2013–2014	→ Cerdanyola (loan)	24	(0)
2014–2016	Rubí	43	(0)
2016–2017	Manlleu	25	(0)
2017–2020	Granollers	47	(0)
2020–2021	Montañesa	20	(0)
2021–2022	Sant Andreu	19	(0)
2022–2023	Engordany	23	(0)
2023–2024	Ordino	30	(1)
2024–2025	Fraga	19	(0)
2025–2026	Lleida	25	(1)
2026–	Binéfar	0	(0)

International career^{‡}
2010–	Andorra	80	(0)
- * Club domestic league appearances and goals as of 10 May 2026 ‡ National team caps and goals as of 29 May 2026

Marc García Renom (born 21 March 1988) is an Andorran footballer who plays as a left-back for Tercera Federación club Binéfar and the Andorra national team.

== Club career ==
Born in Andorra la Vella, García all but spent his entire career in the Spanish lower leagues. He started out at SE Eivissa-Ibiza B, representing in quick succession UD Fraga, UD Pomar, Atlético Monzón and UE Vic.

In June 2013, García signed with Segunda División B club UE Llagostera, being immediately loaned to Palamós CF and then to Cerdanyola del Vallès FC, both from Tercera División. He returned to Andorra two decades after leaving, with the 34-year-old joining UE Engordany.

== International career ==
García made his debut for Andorra on 29 May 2010, in a 4–0 friendly loss against Iceland.

== Personal life ==
While still working as a footballer, García was a physiotherapy student at EU Gimbernat.
