= Benjamin Dahlström =

Finnish footballer (born 2003)

Personal information
- Date of birth: 8 August 2003 (age 23)
- Place of birth: Helsinki, Finland
- Position: Left back

Team information
- Current team: Gnistan
- Number: 2

Youth career
- –2016: HPS
- 2017: KäPa
- 2018–2020: HJK

Senior career*
Years	Team	Apps	(Gls)
2021–2023	Klubi 04	29	(0)
2021	→ PKKU (loan)	19	(3)
2023	HJK	0	(0)
2024	MP	26	(1)
2025–	Gnistan	5	(0)
2025	→ TPS (loan)	10	(1)
- * Club domestic league appearances and goals as of 13 November 2026

Benjamin Dahlström (born 8 August 2003) is a Finnish professional football player who plays as a left back for Gnistan.

== Career ==
Dahlstöm played in the youth sectors of Helsingin Palloseura (HPS), Käpylän Pallo (KäPa) and HJK Helsinki, before joining HJK's reserve team Klubi 04 in 2021.

For the 2024 season, Dahlström signed with Mikkelin Palloilijat in second-tier Ykkösliiga. Despite the club being relegated, Dahlström was voted the team's best player after the season.

On 14 November 2024, Dahlström signed with Veikkausliiga club Gnistan on a two-year deal.

On 2 August 2025, he was loaned out to TPS.

== Personal life ==
His older brother Sebastian is also a professional footballer.

== Career statistics ==
As of 27 July 2026

Appearances and goals by club, season and competition
Club	Season	League			National cup (Note: Includes Suomen Cup)		League cup (Note: Includes Finnish League Cup and Ykkösliigacup)		Europe		Total	
Club	Season	Division	Apps	Goals	Apps	Goals	Apps	Goals	Apps	Goals	Apps	Goals
PK Keski-Uusimaa (loan)	2021	Kakkonen	19	3	–		–		–		19	3
Klubi 04	2022	Kakkonen	15	0	2	0	–		–		17	0
Klubi 04	2023	Kakkonen	14	0	–		–		–		14	0
Klubi 04	Total		29	0	2	0	0	0	0	0	31	0
HJK Helsinki	2023	Veikkausliiga	0	0	0	0	1	0	0	0	1	0
MP	2024	Ykkösliiga	26	1	1	0	4	1	–		31	2
Gnistan	2025	Veikkausliiga	1	0	3	0	5	0	–		9	0
Gnistan	2025	Veikkausliiga	2	0	0	0	1	0	–		3	0
Gnistan	Total		3	0	3	0	6	0	0	0	12	0
TPS (loan)	2025	Ykkösliiga	12	1	–		–		–		12	1
Career total			89	5	6	0	11	1	0	0	106	6

== Honours ==
HJK

- Finnish League Cup: 2023
