= UD Pomar =

Pomar
- Full name: Unión Deportiva Pomar
- Founded: 1980
- Ground: La Cortada, Pomar de Cinca, Aragón, Spain
- Capacity: 1,000
- Chairman: (Spain) Óscar Penella
- Manager: (Spain) Diego Zuriguel
- League: Segunda Regional – Group 2, subgroup 2
- 2024–25: Segunda Regional – Group 2, subgroup 2, 14th of 15
Home colours	Away colours

Unión Deportiva Pomar is a Spanish football team based in Pomar de Cinca, in the autonomous community of Aragón. Founded in 1980, it plays in Segunda Regional – Group 2, subgroup 2, holding home games at La Cortada, with a 1,000-seat capacity.

== Season to season ==
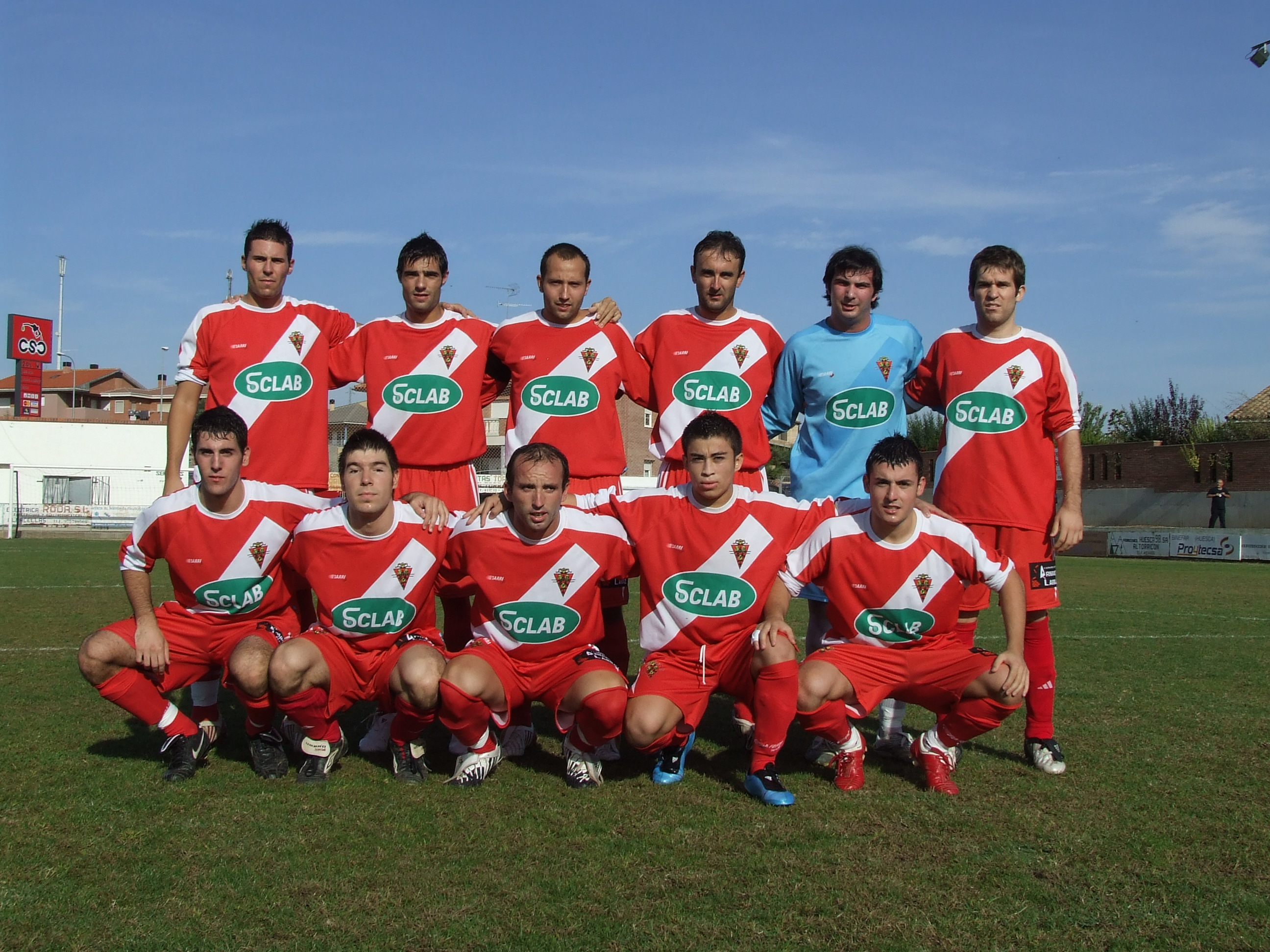
Pomar lineup in a match against Altorricón in 2009

Season	Tier	Division	Place	Copa del Rey
1980–81	7	2ª Reg.	5th	
1981–82	7	2ª Reg.	3rd	
1982–83	7	2ª Reg.	5th	
1983–84	7	2ª Reg.	7th	
1984–85	7	2ª Reg.	7th	
1985–86	7	2ª Reg.	11th	
1986–87	7	2ª Reg.	12th	
1987–88	7	2ª Reg.	3rd	
1988–89	7	2ª Reg.	2nd	
1989–90	7	2ª Reg.	5th	
1990–91	7	2ª Reg.	11th	
1991–92	7	2ª Reg.	5th	
1992–93	7	2ª Reg.	7th	
1993–94	DNP			
1994–95	7	2ª Reg.	2nd	
1995–96	6	1ª Reg.	11th	
1996–97	6	1ª Reg.	7th	
1997–98	6	1ª Reg.	8th	
1998–99	6	1ª Reg.	4th	
1999–2000	6	1ª Reg.	3rd	

Season	Tier	Division	Place	Copa del Rey
2000–01	5	Reg. Pref.	10th	
2001–02	5	Reg. Pref.	13th	
2002–03	5	Reg. Pref.	7th	
2003–04	5	Reg. Pref.	4th	
2004–05	5	Reg. Pref.	14th	
2005–06	5	Reg. Pref.	11th	
2006–07	5	Reg. Pref.	5th	
2007–08	5	Reg. Pref.	6th	
2008–09	5	Reg. Pref.	13th	
2009–10	5	Reg. Pref.	4th	
2010–11	4	3ª	18th	
2011–12	5	Reg. Pref.	12th	
2012–13	5	Reg. Pref.	11th	
2013–14	5	Reg. Pref.	17th	
2014–15	6	1ª Reg.	16th	
2015–16	7	2ª Reg.	12th	
2016–17	DNP			
2017–18	DNP			
2018–19	DNP			
2019–20	7	2ª Reg.	8th	

Season	Tier	Division	Place	Copa del Rey
2020–21	DNP			
2021–22	8	2ª Reg.	11th	
2022–23	8	2ª Reg.	15th	
2023–24	8	2ª Reg.	13th	
2024–25	8	2ª Reg.	14th	
2025–26	8	2ª Reg.		

- 1 seasons in Tercera División
