= William Parra (footballer) =

Colombian footballer (born 1995)

Personal information
- Full name: William Parra Sinisterra
- Date of birth: 1 March 1995 (age 31)
- Place of birth: El Charco, Colombia
- Height: 1.77 m (5 ft 10 in)
- Position: Midfielder

Senior career*
Years	Team	Apps	(Gls)
2014–2020	Medellín	50	(0)
2017	→ La Equidad (loan)	11	(0)
2019	→ HJK (loan)	10	(2)
2020	→ Sheriff Tiraspol (loan)	18	(2)
2021–2022	Deportes Tolima	25	(0)
2022	Cúcuta Deportivo	13	(0)
2023	Always Ready	7	(0)
2023	Envigado	10	(0)
2024	Cúcuta Deportivo	20	(2)
2024–2025	Real Esteli	36	(8)
2026	Rangers (HKG)	6	(0)
- * Club domestic league appearances and goals as of 16 May 2026

William Parra Sinisterra (1 March 1995) is a Colombian professional footballer who plays as a midfielder.

== Club career ==
On 17 June 2019, Parra joined HJK on loan until the end of the 2019 season, with the option of an additional year and making the transfer permanent.

Parra signed with Moldovan team, Sheriff Tiraspol, on 20 December 2019.

On 12 January 2026, Parra joined Hong Kong Premier League club Rangers.

== Career statistics ==
=== Club ===
As of match played 27 October 2019

Appearances and goals by club, season and competition
Club	Season	League			Cup		Continental		Total	
Club	Season	Division	Apps	Goals	Apps	Goals	Apps	Goals	Apps	Goals
Independiente Medellín	2014	Categoría Primera A	1	0	5	0	-		1	0
Independiente Medellín	2015	Categoría Primera A	0	0	2	0	-		2	0
Independiente Medellín	2016	Categoría Primera A	17	0	8	0	3	0	28	0
Independiente Medellín	2017	Categoría Primera A	0	0	0	0	0	0	0	0
Independiente Medellín	2018	Categoría Primera A	24	0	0	0	0	0	24	0
Independiente Medellín	2019	Categoría Primera A	8	0	0	0	2	0	10	0
Independiente Medellín	Total		50	0	15	0	5	0	70	0
La Equidad (loan)	2017	Categoría Primera A	11	0	1	0	-		12	0
HJK (loan)	2019	Veikkausliiga	10	2	0	0	4	0	13	2
Sheriff Tiraspol (loan)	2020–21	Moldovan Super Liga	18	2	0	0	3	0	21	2
Deportes Tolima	2021	Categoría Primera A	25	0	6	0	4	0	35	0
Cúcuta Deportivo	2022	Categoría Primera B	13	0	–		–		13	0
Always Ready	2023	Bolivian Primera División	7	0	2	0	2	0	11	0
Envigado	2023	Categoría Primera A	10	0	–		–		10	0
Cúcuta Deportivo	2024	Categoría Primera B	20	2	–		–		20	2
Real Esteli	2024–25	Liga Primera de Nicaragua	16	4	0	0	6	0	22	4
Career total			180	10	24	0	18	0	222	10
