= Juhani Ojala =

Finnish footballer (born 1989)

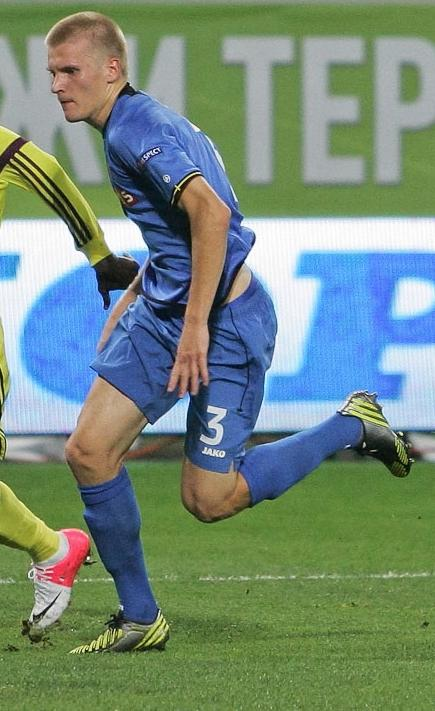
- Ojala with Young Boys in 2012

Personal information
- Full name: Juhani Lauri Henrik Ojala
- Date of birth: 19 June 1989 (age 37)
- Place of birth: Vantaa, Finland
- Height: 1.91 m (6 ft 3 in)
- Position: Centre-back

Team information
- Current team: Gnistan (head of recruitment)

Youth career
- 2001–2005: VJS
- 2006–2008: HJK

Senior career*
Years	Team	Apps	(Gls)
2008–2009	Klubi 04	14	(1)
2009–2011	HJK	41	(1)
2011–2013	Young Boys	23	(0)
2013–2016	Terek Grozny	24	(0)
2015	→ HJK (loan)	4	(0)
2016	SJK	9	(0)
2017–2019	Häcken	32	(4)
2019–2021	Vejle	45	(3)
2021–2022	Motherwell	21	(1)
2023	Doxa Katokopias	10	(0)
2023	Honka	4	(0)
2023	Honka II	1	(0)
2024–2026	Gnistan	68	(3)

International career^{‡}
2007	Finland U19	1	(0)
2008–2009	Finland U20	3	(0)
2009–2010	Finland U21	6	(0)
2011–2021	Finland	32	(1)

Managerial career
- 2027–: Gnistan (head of recruitment)
Medal record
Men's football
Representing Finland
Baltic Cup
Second place	Baltic Cup	2012
Third place	Baltic Cup	2014
- * Club domestic league appearances and goals as of 13 November 2026 ‡ National team caps and goals as of 17:16, 29 July 2021 (UTC)

Juhani Ojala (Finnish pronunciation: [ˈjuhɑni ˈojɑlɑ]; born 19 June 1989) is a Finnish former professional footballer who played as a centre-back. He currently works as a head of recruitment and scouting of Veikkausliiga club Gnistan. Ojala was born in Vantaa, Finland where he played for the local youth team before moving to HJK's organisation.

Ojala made his international debut for Finland in November 2011, at the age of 22.

== Club career ==
=== HJK Helsinki ===
During the 2009 season, Ojala represented mostly Klubi-04, HJK's reserve squad. In the beginning of the 2010 season, however, he was selected to HJK's first eleven, due to various injuries in the squad. His performances were outstanding, and he quickly established himself as one of the key players in HJK's victorious 2010 campaign, playing in all games. Ojala became one of the best and most talented players in the Veikkausliiga, and his performances provoked widespread international interest. At the end of the 2010 Veikkausliiga season, he was officially selected as the defender of the year.

=== Young Boys ===
On 9 April 2011 Ojala signed a contract extension with HJK, the new contract running until 2014. But in July, HJK announced that Ojala would transfer to Swiss team BSC Young Boys on 13 August, for a transfer fee of €600,000.

He gained notoriety in England during Young Boys' 2012–13 UEFA Europa League group stage match against Liverpool at the Stade de Suisse. In an eventful match, which ended 5–3 to the Reds, Ojala opened the score with an own goal, putting the ball past Marco Wölfli, his own goalkeeper. He later made amends by scoring a header to bring Young Boys level at 2–2 just after half time.

=== Terek Grozny ===
After a year and a half in Switzerland on 12 February 2013 it was announced that Ojala would transfer to Russian Premier League team Terek Grozny, for a fee of €500,000.

==== Loan to HJK Helsinki ====
On 29 July 2015, Ojala rejoined HJK on loan for the remainder of the 2015 Veikkausliiga season. He had a trial with Coventry City at the end of the season, but was not signed.

=== SJK ===
On 1 September 2016, Ojala signed with SJK. He made his debut for SJK on 9 September 2016 playing full 90 minutes in a match against Inter Turku.

=== Vejle ===
On 26 August 2019, Danish 1st Division club Vejle Boldklub confirmed, that they had signed Ojala. He reached promotion to the Danish Superliga during his first season at the club, and personally finished with 22 appearances in which he scored two goals.

On 14 September 2020, his debut in the Superliga, he scored in a 4–2 loss to rivals AGF.

=== Motherwell ===
On 29 July 2021, Motherwell announced the signing of Ojala on a two-year contract. Ojala left Motherwell by mutual consent on 1 September 2022, having played 24 times for the club.

=== Doxa Katokopias ===
On 11 January 2023, Doxa Katokopias announced the signing of Ojala.

=== Return to Finland ===
After a short stint with Honka in 2023, Ojala signed with newly promoted Veikkausliiga club IF Gnistan ahead of the 2024 Veikkausliiga season. On 27 June 2025, Ojala made his 100th appearance in the league and scored his first goal for Gnistan, in a 2–2 home draw against Inter Turku, with a long ball from the halfway line over the Inter goalkeeper Eetu Huuhtanen. He retired after the 2026 season.

== After playing career ==
After Ojala announced his retirement from professional playing career, he was appointed the head of recruitment and scouting of Gnistan. He had already assisted the club in the same role part-time during his playing career.

== International career ==
In November 2010, after representing Finland on youth levels, Ojala was called up to the national team squad to face San Marino. He made his national team debut on 15 November 2011 in a friendly match against Denmark in Esbjerg when Mixu Paatelainen used him as a substitute. He gained his first FIFA World Cup qualification appearance 12 October 2012 in Helsinki Olympic Stadium in a match against Georgia. During autumn of 2012 he established himself as a regular in the national team. He made his first goal for Finland on 9 January 2017 in a friendly match in Tahnoun bin Mohammed Stadium, Al Ain against Morocco.

Ojala was called up for the UEFA Euro 2020 pre-tournament friendly match against Sweden on 29 May 2021.

== Career statistics ==
=== Club ===
As of 13 November 2026

Appearances and goals by club, season and competition
Club	Season	League			National cup (Note: Includes Suomen Cup, Swiss Cup, Russian Cup, Svenska Cupen, Danish Cup, Scottish Cup and Cypriot Cup)		League cup (Note: Includes Finnish League Cup and Scottish League Cup)		Continental		Total	
Club	Season	Division	Apps	Goals	Apps	Goals	Apps	Goals	Apps	Goals	Apps	Goals
Klubi 04	2009	Ykkönen	11	1	—		—		—		11	1
HJK	2009	Veikkausliiga	4	0					—		4	0
HJK	2010	Veikkausliiga	24	0	4	1	7	0	6 (Note: Four appearances and one goal in the UEFA Champions League, two appearances in the UEFA Europa League)	1	41	2
HJK	2011	Veikkausliiga	17	1	2	0	2	0	2 (Note: Appearances in the UEFA Champions League)	0	23	1
HJK	Total		45	1	6	1	9	0	8	1	68	3
Young Boys	2011–12	Swiss Super League	11	0	1	0	—		—		12	0
Young Boys	2012–13	Swiss Super League	12	0	0	0	—		10 (Note: Appearances and goals in the UEFA Europa League)	1	22	1
Young Boys	Total		23	0	1	0	0	0	10	1	34	1
Terek Grozny	2012–13	Russian Premier League	3	0	0	0	—		—		3	0
Terek Grozny	2013–14	Russian Premier League	20	0	1	0	—		—		21	0
Terek Grozny	2014–15	Russian Premier League	1	0	1	0	—		—		2	0
Terek Grozny	2015–16	Russian Premier League	0	0	0	0	—		—		0	0
Terek Grozny	Total		24	0	2	0	0	0	0	0	26	0
HJK (loan)	2015	Veikkausliiga	4	0	0	0	0	0	2	0	6	0
SJK	2016	Veikkausliiga	9	0	2	1	0	0	0	0	11	1
BK Häcken	2017	Allsvenskan	23	3	1	0	—		—		24	0
BK Häcken	2018	Allsvenskan	6	0	4	0	—		0	0	10	0
BK Häcken	2019	Allsvenskan	3	1	1	0	—		1	0	5	0
BK Häcken	Total		32	4	6	0	0	0	1	0	39	4
Vejle	2019–20	Danish 1st Division	22	2	0	0	—		—		22	2
Vejle	2020–21	Danish Superliga	23	1	1	0	—		—		24	1
Vejle	Total		45	3	1	0	0	0	0	0	46	3
Motherwell	2021–22	Scottish Premiership	21	1	2	0	1	0	—		24	1
Doxa Katokopias	2022–23	Cypriot First Division	10	0	2	0	—		—		5	0
Honka	2023	Veikkausliiga	4	0	0	0	0	0	0	0	4	0
Honka II	2023	Kakkonen	1	0	—		—		—		1	0
Gnistan	2024	Veikkausliiga	25	0	0	0	5	0	—		30	0
Gnistan	2025	Veikkausliiga	29	3	1	0	5	0	–		35	3
Gnistan	2026	Veikkausliiga	14	0	0	0	4	0	–		18	0
Gnistan	Total		68	3	1	0	14	0	0	0	83	3
Career total			298	13	23	2	23	0	21	2	334	17

=== International ===
As of match played 29 May 2021

Appearances and goals by national team, year and competition
Team	Year	Competitive		Friendly		Total	
Team	Year	Apps	Goals	Apps	Goals	Apps	Goals
Finland	2011	0	0	1	0	1	0
Finland	2012	1 (Note: Appearance in the 2014 FIFA World Cup qualification.)	0	4	0	4	0
Finland	2013	1 (Note: Appearance in the 2014 FIFA World Cup qualification.)	0	2	0	3	0
Finland	2014	0	0	4	0	4	0
Finland	2015	1 (Note: Appearances in the UEFA Euro 2016 qualifying.)	0	0	0	1	0
Finland	2016	1 (Note: Appearance in the 2018 FIFA World Cup qualification.)	0	1	0	1	0
Finland	2017	3 (Note: Appearances in the 2018 FIFA World Cup qualification.)	0	3	1	6	1
Finland	2018	0	0	1	0	1	0
Finland	2019	0	0	2	0	2	0
Finland	2020	2 (Note: Appearances in the 2020–21 UEFA Nations League.)	0	2	0	4	0
Finland	2021	0	0	2	0	2	0
Total		9	0	22	1	31	1

=== International goals ===
Scores and results list Finland's goal tally first.

No	Date	Venue	Opponent	Score	Result	Competition
1.	9 January 2017	Tahnoun bin Mohamed Stadium, Al Ain, United Arab Emirates	Morocco	1–0	1–0	Friendly

== Honours ==
HJK

- Veikkausliiga: 2009, 2010

Vejle

- Danish 1st Division: 2020

Finland

- 2012 Baltic Cup Runner-up
- 2014 Baltic Cup Bronze

Individual

- Veikkausliiga defender of the year: 2010
