= San Miguel del Cinca =

Coordinates: 41°49′20″N 0°04′34″E

San Miguel del Cinca, Spain
- Flag Coat of arms
- Interactive map of San Miguel del Cinca, Spain
- Country: Spain
- Autonomous community: Aragon
- Province: Huesca
- Municipality: San Miguel del Cinca

Area
  - Total: 106 km^{2} (41 sq mi)

Population (2025-01-01)
  - Total: 775
  - Density: 7.31/km^{2} (18.9/sq mi)
- Time zone: UTC+1 (CET)
  - Summer (DST): UTC+2 (CEST)

San Miguel del Cinca (Aragonese: Sant Miguel d'a Cinca) is a municipality located in the province of Huesca, Aragon, Spain. According to the 2004 census (INE), the municipality has a population of 873 inhabitants.

== History ==
This municipality was formed on November 16, 1972 by the union of the towns of Estiche de Cinca, Pomar de Cinca and Santalecina.

== Population ==
Year	Residents
1981	1,013
1991	982
2001	886
2011	845
2021	792
2024	778
