= Otto Ollikainen =

Finnish footballer (born 2001)

Personal information
- Full name: Otto Ollikainen
- Date of birth: 22 January 2001 (age 25)
- Place of birth: Helsinki, Finland
- Height: 1.80 m (5 ft 11 in)
- Position: Midfielder

Team information
- Current team: West Virginia Mountaineers
- Number: 8

Youth career
- 2012–2018: HJK

College career
Years	Team	Apps	(Gls)
2021–	West Virginia Mountaineers	62	(2)

Senior career*
Years	Team	Apps	(Gls)
2018–2019	Klubi 04	33	(2)
2018–2019	HJK	1	(0)
2019	→ TPS (loan)	5	(0)
2020–2021	Honka	2	(0)
2020–2021	Honka II	2	(0)
2023	SexyPöxyt	4	(0)

International career^{‡}
2017	Finland U16	2	(0)
2017–2018	Finland U17	13	(1)
2019	Finland U18	4	(0)
2019	Finland U19	6	(0)
- * Club domestic league appearances and goals as of 14 January 2023 ‡ National team caps and goals as of 16:30, 23 December 2019 (UTC)

Otto Ollikainen (born 22 January 2001) is a Finnish football player who plays college soccer for West Virginia University.

== Career ==
=== Collegiate career ===
Ahead of the 2021 NCAA Division I men's soccer season, Ollikainen signed a National Letter of Intent to play college soccer for West Virginia University in the United States. Ollikainen made his debut for the university on 26 August 2021, playing 21 minutes in a 2–0 victory against Robert Morris University. On 27 November 2021, he scored his first collegiate goal scoring against University of Tulsa in the third round of the 2021 NCAA Division I Men's Soccer Tournament.

=== Club career ===
On 24 January 2020 it was confirmed, that Ollikainen had joined FC Honka on a deal until the end of the year.
