= Valtteri Vesiaho =

Finnish footballer (born 1999)

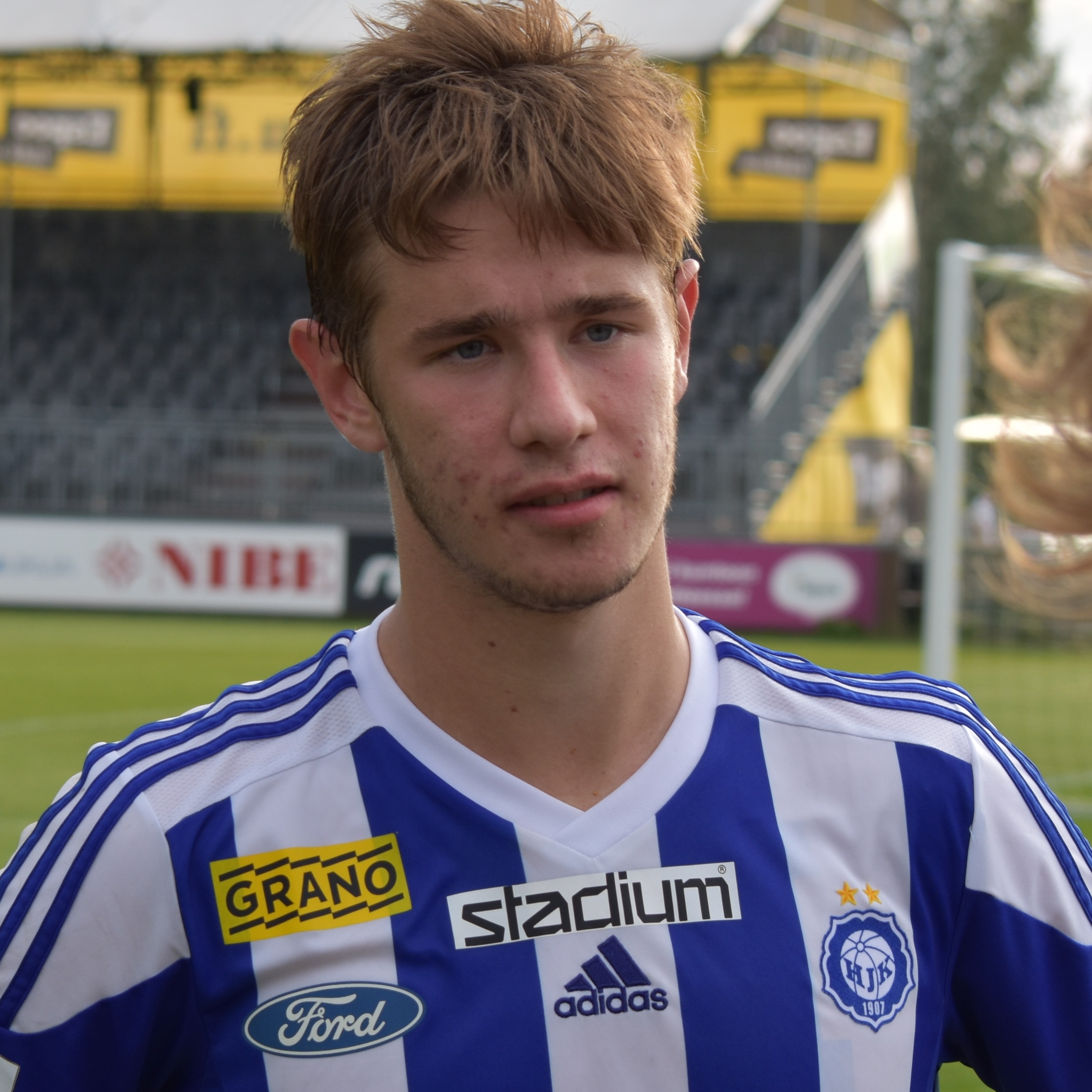
- Vesiaho with HJK in 2018.

Personal information
- Date of birth: 10 February 1999 (age 27)
- Place of birth: Helsinki, Finland
- Height: 1.83 m (6 ft 0 in)
- Position: Defender

Team information
- Current team: Jippo
- Number: 3

Youth career
- –2012: Ponnistus
- 2012–2015: KäPa

Senior career*
Years	Team	Apps	(Gls)
2015	KäPa	4	(1)
2017–2019	HJK	18	(0)
2016–2019	→ Klubi 04 (loan)	53	(2)
2019	TPS	11	(1)
2020	KTP	11	(0)
2020–2021	Haro Deportivo	17	(1)
2021–2022	Córdoba CF B	28	(1)
2022–2024	KTP	52	(0)
2025–	Jippo	39	(2)
- * Club domestic league appearances and goals as of 1 November 2026

Valtteri Vesiaho (born 10 February 1999) is a Finnish professional footballer who plays for Ykkösliiga club Jippo as a central defender.

He began his senior club career playing for KäPa, before signing with HJK at age 15 in 2016.

== Club career ==
=== KäPa ===
Vesiaho made his senior debut in 2015 with KäPa.

=== HJK ===
On 25 October 2016 HJK confirmed that Vesiaho would join the club for the 2017 season. He played for HJK until the summer of 2019, where he joined TPS.

=== TPS ===
A contract with TPS was announced on 10 July 2019.

=== KTP ===
On 28 November 2019, Vasiaho signed a one-year deal with KTP, starting from 2020.

=== Haro Deportivo ===
In September 2020 he moved to Spanish club Haro Deportivo.

=== Córdoba CF B ===
On 27 July 2021 it was reported that Vesiaho had signed a contract with Córdoba CF B.

=== Return to KTP ===
Vesiaho returned to KTP for the 2022 season.

=== Jippo ===
On 14 January 2025, he signed with Jippo in Ykkösliiga for the 2025 season.

== International career ==
Vesiaho has represented Finland on Finland U-16, Finland U-17, Finland U-18 and Finland U-19 youth teams.

== Career statistics ==
As of 26 July 2026

Appearances and goals by club, season and competition
Club	Season	League			Domestic Cups		Continental		Total	
Club	Season	Division	Apps	Goals	Apps	Goals	Apps	Goals	Apps	Goals
KäPa	2015	Kakkonen	4	1	0	0	—		4	1
HJK	2016	Veikkausliiga	0	0	0	0	0	0	0	0
HJK	2017	Veikkausliiga	6	0	2	0	0	0	8	0
HJK	2018	Veikkausliiga	12	0	4	0	1 (Note: Appearance(s) in UEFA Champions League)	0	17	0
HJK	2019	Veikkausliiga	0	0	4	0	0	0	4	0
HJK	Total		18	0	10	0	4	0	29	0
Klubi 04 (loan)	2016	Kakkonen	16	1	0	0	—		16	1
Klubi 04 (loan)	2017	Kakkonen	19	0	0	0	—		19	0
Klubi 04 (loan)	2018	Ykkönen	8	1	0	0	—		8	1
Klubi 04 (loan)	2019	Kakkonen	10	0	0	0	—		10	0
Klubi 04 (loan)	Total		53	2	0	0	0	0	53	2
TPS	2019	Ykkönen	11	1	1	0	—		12	1
TPS	2020	Veikkausliiga	0	0	6	1	—		6	1
TPS	Total		11	1	7	1	0	0	18	2
KTP	2020	Ykkönen	11	0	6	1	—		17	1
Haro Deportivo	2020–21	Segunda División B	17	1	1	0	—		18	1
Córdoba CF B	2021–22	Tercera Federación	28	1	0	0	—		28	1
KTP	2022	Ykkönen	14	0	0	0	—		14	0
KTP	2023	Veikkausliiga	15	0	7	0	—		22	0
KTP	2024	Ykkösliiga	23	0	7	0	–		30	0
KTP	Total		52	0	14	0	0	0	66	0
Jippo	2025	Ykkösliiga	23	2	1	0	–		24	2
Jippo	2026	Ykkösliiga	9	0	0	0	–		9	0
Jippo	Total		32	2	1	0	0	0	33	2
Career total			226	8	39	2	1	0	266	10

== Honours ==
KTP

- Ykkösliiga: 2024
