= Aimar Moratalla =

Spanish footballer (born 1987)

Aimar
Personal information
- Full name: Aimar Moratalla Botifoll
- Date of birth: 11 January 1987 (age 39)
- Place of birth: Sant Antoni, Spain
- Height: 1.77 m (5 ft 9 1/2 in)
- Position: Defender

Youth career
- 1997–2000: Barcelona
- 2000–2001: Damm
- 2001–2003: Cardedeu
- 2003–2005: Granollers
- 2005–2006: Girona

Senior career*
Years	Team	Apps	(Gls)
2006–2007	Granollers	26	(1)
2007–2008	Peralada		
2008–2009	Banyoles	32	(4)
2009–2016	Llagostera	165	(10)
2016	SJK	9	(0)
2017	Cornellà	8	(0)
2017	Granollers	5	(0)
2018	Europa	14	(0)
2018–2022	Costa Brava (Note: UE Llagostera changed its name to UE Costa Brava in 2021.)	67	(4)
2022–2023	Olot	31	(0)
2023–2024	Tona	17	(2)
Total		374	(21)
- * Club domestic league appearances and goals

Aimar Moratalla Botifoll (born 11 January 1987), known simply as Aimar, is a Spanish former professional footballer who played as a right-back or centre-back.

== Club career ==
Born in Sant Antoni de Vilamajor, Barcelona, Catalonia, Aimar made his senior debut with EC Granollers in the regional leagues on 29 October 2006, in a 1–0 away win against UE Cornellà. He signed for CF Peralada of the same league in 2007, and joined Tercera División side CD Banyoles in July 2008.

In summer 2009, Aimar moved to UE Llagostera, recently promoted to the fourth tier. In 2011, after the club's promotion to Segunda División B, he renewed his contract, but struggled to appear regularly due to a pubalgia.

Aimar featured sparingly during the 2013–14 season, as Llagostera reached Segunda División for the first time ever. He played his first match as a professional on 23 August 2014, starting the 2–0 away loss to UD Las Palmas. He scored his only goal in the competition on 7 February of the following year, the game's only in a home victory over Recreativo de Huelva.

Safe for a brief spell in the Finnish Veikkausliiga with Seinäjoen Jalkapallokerho, Aimar continued to play in the Catalan lower leagues. On 27 January 2022, he signed with Tercera Federación club UE Olot, winning promotion to Segunda Federación at the end of the campaign.
