= Ivan Tarasov =

Russian footballer

Personal information
- Full name: Ivan Alekseyevich Tarasov
- Date of birth: 30 January 2000 (age 26)
- Place of birth: Saint Petersburg, Russia
- Height: 1.73 m (5 ft 8 in)
- Position: Forward

Youth career
- Zenit Saint Petersburg

Senior career*
Years	Team	Apps	(Gls)
2017–2022	Zenit Saint Petersburg	0	(0)
2018–2019	→ Zenit-2 Saint Petersburg	13	(0)
2019	→ HJK (loan)	14	(0)
2019	→ Klubi 04 (loan)	2	(0)
2020–2022	→ Zenit-2 Saint Petersburg	39	(5)
2022	SKA-Khabarovsk	1	(0)
2023	Dynamo Saint Petersburg	9	(0)

International career^{‡}
2016	Russia U-17	2	(0)
2017	Russia U-18	5	(0)
2018	Russia U-19	4	(0)
- * Club domestic league appearances and goals as of 12 November 2023 ‡ National team caps and goals as of 9 September 2018

Ivan Alekseyevich Tarasov (Russian: Иван Алексеевич Тарасов; born 30 January 2000) is a Russian football player.

== Club career ==
He made his debut in the Russian Football National League for FC Zenit-2 Saint Petersburg on 29 July 2018 in a game against FC Luch Vladivostok.

On 25 February 2019, he joined Finnish club HJK on loan.

== Career statistics ==
As of 13 May 2025

Appearances and goals by club, season and competition
Club	Season	League			National cup (Note: Includes Russian Cup and Suomen Cup)		Continental		Total	
Club	Season	Division	Apps	Goals	Apps	Goals	Apps	Goals	Apps	Goals
Zenit	2017–18	Russian Premier League	0	0	0	0	0	0	0	0
Zenit-2	2018–19	Russian First League	13	0	–		–		13	0
HJK Helsinki (loan)	2019	Veikkausliiga	14	0	0	0	3 (Note: Appearances in UEFA Champions League and UEFA Europa League)	0	17	0
Klubi 04 (loan)	2019	Kakkonen	2	0	–		–		2	0
Zenit-2	2020–21	Russian Second League	20	1	–		–		20	1
Zenit-2	2021–22	Russian Second League	20	4	–		–		20	4
Zenit-2	Total		40	5	0	0	0	0	40	5
SKA-Khabarovsk	2022–23	Russian First League	1	0	0	0	–		1	0
Dynamo S-Pb	2023	Russian Second League B	9	0	2	0	–		11	0
Career total			25	2	0	0	2	0	28	2
