= Jarkko Hurme =

Finnish footballer (born 1986)

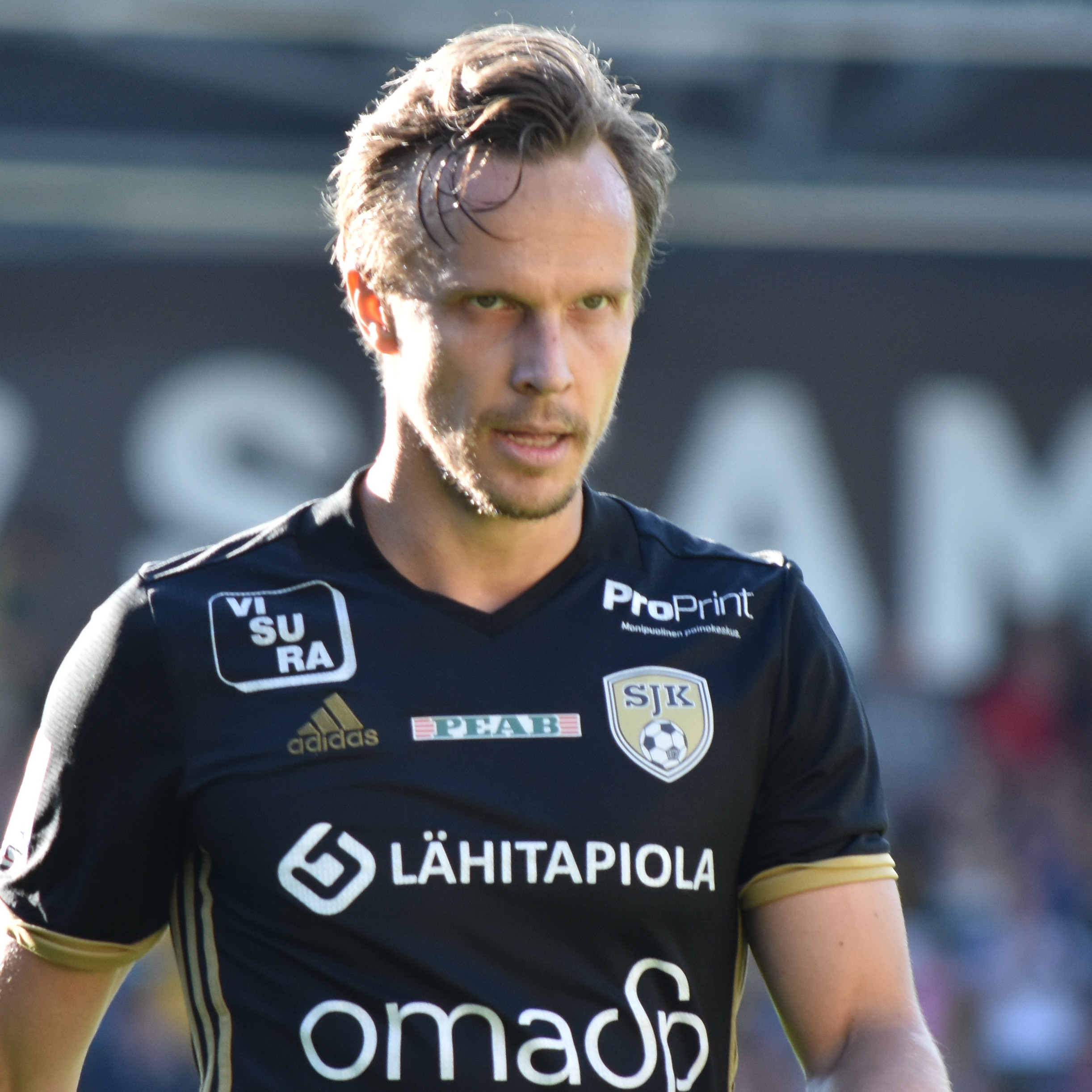
- Hurme with SJK in 2018.

Personal information
- Full name: Jarkko Erkki Tapani Hurme
- Date of birth: 4 June 1986 (age 40)
- Place of birth: Oulu, Finland
- Height: 1.78 m (5 ft 10 in)
- Position: Defender

Senior career*
Years	Team	Apps	(Gls)
2002–2003	OLS	21	(0)
2004	AC Oulu	20	(0)
2005	RoPS	20	(0)
2006–2007	Udinese	0	(0)
2007–2009	Hellas Verona	10	(0)
2009–2010	AC Oulu	33	(0)
2011–2013	TPS	81	(1)
2014–2015	Odd	15	(1)
2016–2019	SJK	75	(2)
2020	KPV	18	(0)
2021	AC Oulu	9	(0)

International career^{‡}
2012–2016	Finland	11	(1)
- * Club domestic league appearances and goals as of 26 November 2021 ‡ National team caps and goals as of 14 October 2014

Jarkko Erkki Hurme (born 4 June 1986) is a Finnish footballer who plays as a defender, primarily as a right back.

== Club career ==
Born in Oulu, Hurme, a right back, started his career at OLS Oulu and AC Oulu, before moving to Veikkausliiga club RoPS for the 2005 season. He then transferred to Udinese Calcio of the Italian Serie A on 1 January 2006. He played for Hellas Verona in Serie C1 during the 2007–08 and 2008–09 seasons. In the summer 2009 he returned to AC Oulu and helped them to win Ykkönen.

Hurme later played for TPS, where he was the team's captain. He signed a two-year contract with the Norwegian Tippeligaen side Odd ahead of the 2014 season. He made his league debut on 20 May 2014, starting against Aalesund FK, helping his side to a 2–1 win at home.

== International career ==
Hurme was a regular for the Finnish Under-21 national team. He also played for Finland at the FIFA U-17 World Championship 2003.

Hurme earned his first cap for Finland in 2012 Baltic Cup against Estonia on 1 June 2012 in Tartu, Estonia. He came on as a substitute in the 63rd minute. He scored his first international goal in a home game against Greece in the Euro 2016 Qualifiers on 11 October 2014.

== Career statistics ==
=== Club ===
As of 1 September 2024.

Appearances and goals by club, season and competition
Club	Season	League			Cup (Note: Includes Suomen Cup and Norwegian Cup)		League cup (Note: Includes Finnish League Cup)		Europe		Total	
Club	Season	Division	Apps	Goals	Apps	Goals	Apps	Goals	Apps	Goals	Apps	Goals
OLS Oulu	2003	Ykkönen	3	0	–		–		–		3	0
OLS Oulu	2004	Kakkonen	18	0	–		–		–		18	0
OLS Oulu	Total		21	0	0	0	0	0	0	0	21	0
AC Oulu	2004	Ykkönen	20	0	0	0	–		–		20	0
RoPS	2005	Veikkausliiga	20	0	–		–		–		20	0
Udinese	2005–06	Serie A	0	0	0	0	–		–			
Udinese	2006–07	Serie A	0	0	0	0	–		–		0	0
Udinese	Total		0	0	0	0	0	0	0	0	0	0
Hellas Verona	2007–08	Serie C	10	0	–		–		–		10	0
AC Oulu	2009	Ykkönen	9	0	–		–		–		9	0
AC Oulu	2010	Veikkausliiga	24	0	0	0	2	0	–		26	0
AC Oulu	Total		33	0	0	0	2	0	0	0	35	0
TPS	2011	Veikkausliiga	30	1	0	0	–		2 (Note: Appearances in UEFA Europa League)	0	32	1
TPS	2012	Veikkausliiga	27	0	1	0	8	0	–		35	0
TPS	2013	Veikkausliiga	24	0	1	0	6	0	2	0	33	0
TPS	Total		81	1	2	0	14	0	4	0	101	1
Odd	2014	Tippeligaen	13	1	6	0	–		–		19	1
Odd	2015	Tippeligaen	2	0	2	0	–		1	0	5	0
Odd	Total		15	1	8	0	0	0	1	0	24	1
Odd 2	2014	2. divisjon	10	1	–		–		–		10	1
Odd 2	2015	2. divisjon	16	1	–		–		–		16	1
Odd 2	Total		26	2	0	0	0	0	0	0	26	2
SJK	2016	Veikkausliiga	26	1	4	0	5	0	2 (Note: Appearances in UEFA Champions League)	0	37	1
SJK	2017	Veikkausliiga	24	1	1	0	–		2	0	27	1
SJK	2018	Veikkausliiga	17	0	6	0	–		–		23	0
SJK	2019	Veikkausliiga	8	0	0	0	–		–		8	0
SJK	Total		75	2	11	0	5	0	4	0	95	2
SJK Akatemia	2019	Kakkonen	1	0	–		–		–		1	0
KPV	2020	Ykkönen	18	0	2	0	–		–		20	0
AC Oulu	2021	Veikkausliiga	9	0	3	0	–		–		12	0
Career total			329	6	26	0	21	0	9	0	385	6

=== International goals ===
Scores and results lists Finland's goal tally first.

#	Date	Venue	Opponent	Score	Result	Competition
1	11 October 2014	Olympiastadion, Helsinki, Finland	Greece	1–1	1–1	UEFA Euro 2016 qualifying

== Honours ==
TPS

- Finnish League Cup: 2012

SJK

- Finnish Cup: 2016

Individual

- Veikkausliiga Best defender: 2012
