= Sebastian Dahlström =

Finnish footballer (born 1996)

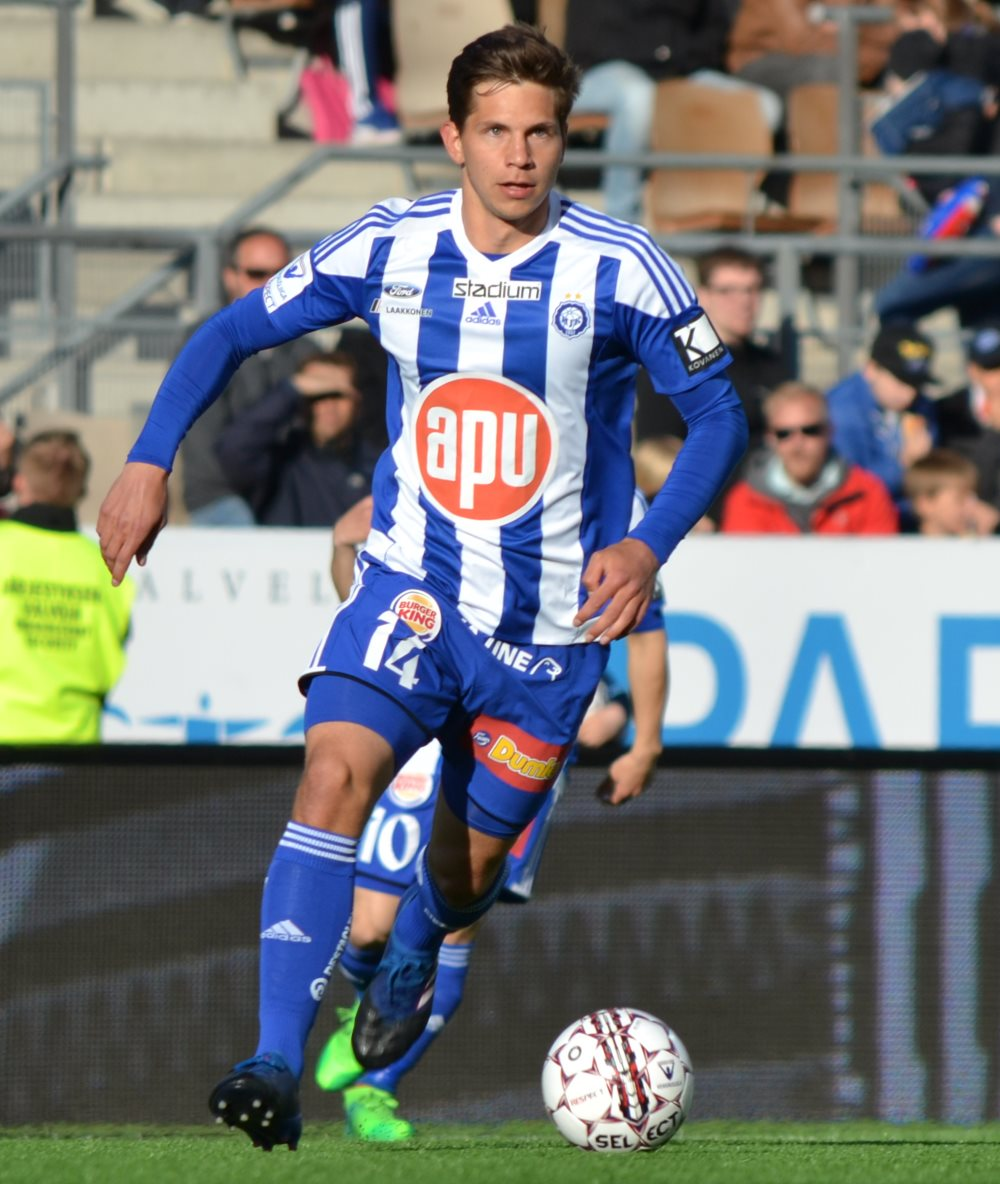
- Dahlström with HJK in 2017

Personal information
- Date of birth: 5 November 1996 (age 30)
- Place of birth: Helsinki, Finland
- Height: 1.81 m (5 ft 11 1/2 in)
- Position: Midfielder

Team information
- Current team: IFK Mariehamn
- Number: 10

Youth career
- –2008: HPS
- 2009–2014: HJK

Senior career*
Years	Team	Apps	(Gls)
2015–2016	Klubi 04	26	(6)
2016–2019	HJK	100	(10)
2020–2021	Sheriff Tiraspol	16	(1)
2021	HJK	7	(0)
2021	→ Klubi 04	3	(2)
2022–2023	KuPS	38	(1)
2024–	IFK Mariehamn	64	(9)

International career^{‡}
2019	Finland	2	(0)
- * Club domestic league appearances and goals as of 13 November 2026 ‡ National team caps and goals as of 11 January 2019

Sebastian Dahlström (born 5 November 1996) is a Finnish football player who plays for IFK Mariehamn.

== Club career ==
On 18 December 2019, Sheriff Tiraspol announced that Dahlström would join the club on 20 January 2020. In 2021, he made a one-season contract with his old club HJK.

On 10 December 2021, he signed a two-year contract with KuPS.

Dahlström signed with fellow Veikkausliiga club IFK Mariehamn on 13 November 2023, on a two-year deal, starting in the 2024 season.

== International career ==
Dahlström made his debut for the Finland national football team on 8 January 2019 in a friendly against Sweden, as a half-time substitute for Tim Sparv.

== Personal life ==
His younger brother Benjamin is also a footballer.

== Career statistics ==
=== Club ===
As of 13 November 2026

Appearances and goals by club, season and competition
Club	Season	League			National cup (Note: Includes Suomen Cup and Moldovan Cup)		League cup (Note: Includes Finnish League Cup)		Continental		Total	
Club	Season	Division	Apps	Goals	Apps	Goals	Apps	Goals	Apps	Goals	Apps	Goals
Klubi 04	2015	Kakkonen	25	6	–		–		–		25	6
Klubi 04	2016	Kakkonen	1	0	–		–		–		1	0
Klubi 04	Total		26	6	–						26	6
HJK	2015	Veikkausliiga	0	0	0	0	1	0	0	0	1	0
HJK	2016	Veikkausliiga	21	3	5	0	5	0	2	0	33	3
HJK	2017	Veikkausliiga	26	3	8	2	–		3	0	37	5
HJK	2018	Veikkausliiga	32	2	9	1	–		6	1	47	4
HJK	2019	Veikkausliiga	21	2	2	1	–		6	1	29	4
HJK	Total		100	10	24	4	6	0	17	2	147	16
Sheriff Tiraspol	2020–21	Moldovan Super Liga	16	1	1	0	–		0	0	17	1
HJK	2021	Veikkausliiga	7	0	1	0	–		2	0	10	0
Klubi 04	2021	Ykkönen	3	2	–		–		–		3	2
KuPS	2022	Veikkausliiga	19	1	4	0	2	0	6	0	31	1
KuPS	2023	Veikkausliiga	19	0	3	1	4	0	1	0	27	1
KuPS	Total		38	1	7	1	6	0	7	0	58	2
IFK Mariehamn	2024	Veikkausliiga	25	4	2	0	5	0	–		32	4
IFK Mariehamn	2025	Veikkausliiga	26	3	1	0	5	0	–		32	3
IFK Mariehamn	2026	Veikkausliiga	13	2	1	0	5	0	–		19	2
IFK Mariehamn	Total		64	9	4	0	15	0	0	0	83	9
Career total			254	30	37	5	21	0	26	2	338	37

=== International ===
Finland national team
Year	Apps	Goals
2019	2	0
Total	2	0

Statistics accurate as of match played 11 January 2019

== Honours ==
Individual

- Veikkausliiga Team of the Year: 2018
