= SE Eivissa-Ibiza B =

Spanish football club

Eivissa-Ibiza B
- Full name: Societat Esportiva Eivissa-Ibiza B
- Founded: 2006
- Dissolved: 2009
- Ground: Can Misses, Ibiza Town, Balearic Islands, Spain
- Capacity: 10,000
- Chairman: (Spain) Pedro Ortega Cano
- Manager: (Spain) Sergio Tortosa
- 2008–09: 3ª - Group 11, 12th
Home colours	Away colours

Societat Esportiva Eivissa-Ibiza B was a football team based in Ibiza Town in the autonomous community of Balearic Islands. Founded in 2006, it last played in the Tercera División – Group 11. It was the reserve team of UD Ibiza-Eivissa.

== History ==
The first team Societat Esportiva Eivissa-Ibiza was founded in 1995 as Unión Deportiva Ibiza. In 1997 the team is renamed to Club Esportiu Eivissa and, in 2001, is renamed with its original denomination.

The second team founded in 2006. It was dissolved in 2009 following the relegation of first team to Regional de Ibiza.

== Season to season ==
Season	Tier	Division	Place
2006–07	5	Reg. Pref.	4th
2007–08	5	Reg. Pref.	3rd
2008–09	4	3ª	12th

- 1 season in Tercera División
