= 2018 HJK season =

HJK
2018 season
- Chairman: Olli-Pekka Lyytikäinen
- Manager: Mika Lehkosuo
- Stadium: Telia 5G -areena
- Veikkausliiga: Champions
- Finnish Cup: Runners-up
- UEFA Champions League: Second qualifying round
- UEFA Europa League: Third qualifying round
- Top goalscorer: League: Klauss (21); All: Klauss (24)
| Home colours | Away colours |

The 2018 season is Helsingin Jalkapalloklubi's 110th competitive season.

== Squad ==
As of match played 27 October 2018

| No. | Name | Nationality | Position | Date of birth (age) | Signed from | Signed in | Contract ends | Apps. | Goals |
Goalkeepers
| 1 | Markus Uusitalo | (Finland) | GK | 15 May 1997 (age 29) | VPS | 2016 | 2018+1 | 38 | 0 |
| 12 | Robin Källman | (Finland) | GK | 12 February 1999 (age 27) | Klubi 04 | 2018 | 2019+1 | 0 | 0 |
| 35 | Jere Piirainen | (Finland) | GK | 10 April 1998 (age 28) | Klubi 04 | 2018 | | 0 | 0 |
| 88 | Maksim Rudakov | (Russia) | GK | 22 January 1996 (age 30) | loan from Zenit St.Petersburg | 2017 | 2018 | 38 | 0 |
Defenders
| 4 | Hannu Patronen | (Finland) | DF | 23 May 1984 (age 42) | Sogndal | 2017 | 2018+1 | 49 | 5 |
| 5 | Daniel O'Shaughnessy | (Finland) | DF | 14 September 1994 (age 32) | Cheltenham Town | 2018 | 2019+1 | 24 | 3 |
| 6 | Juha Pirinen | (Finland) | DF | 22 October 1991 (age 35) | RoPS | 2017 | 2018 | 68 | 0 |
| 8 | Rafinha (captain) | (Brazil) | DF | 29 June 1982 (age 44) | Gent | 2017 | 2019 | 167 | 11 |
| 15 | Ville Jalasto | (Finland) | DF | 19 April 1986 (age 40) | Stabæk | 2017 | 2018 | 88 | 7 |
| 16 | Kalle Katz | (Finland) | DF | 4 January 2000 (age 26) | Klubi 04 | 2018 | | 1 | 0 |
| 18 | Roni Peiponen | (Finland) | DF | 9 April 1997 (age 29) | Molde | 2018 | 2019+1 | 52 | 2 |
| 21 | Mikko Sumusalo | (Finland) | DF | 12 March 1990 (age 36) | Chemnitzer FC | 2018 | 2018+1 | 91+ | 3+ |
| 25 | Valtteri Vesiaho | (Finland) | DF | 10 February 1999 (age 27) | Klubi 04 | 2017 | 2018+1 | 25 | 1 |
| 32 | Faith Friday Obilor | (Nigeria) | DF | 5 March 1991 (age 35) | Inter Turku | 2017 | 2018 | 79 | 4 |
| 42 | Samu Laitinen | (Finland) | DF | 13 August 1999 (age 27) | Klubi 04 | 2018 | | 1 | 0 |
| 57 | Kevin Kouassivi-Benissan | (Finland) | DF | 25 January 1999 (age 27) | Klubi 04 | 2018 | | 2 | 0 |
| 61 | Otto Ollikainen | (Finland) | DF | 22 January 2001 (age 25) | Klubi 04 | 2018 | | 2 | 0 |
Midfields
| 14 | Sebastian Dahlström | (Finland) | MF | 5 November 1996 (age 30) | Klubi 04 | 2015 | 2019 | 118 | 12 |
| 22 | Anthony Annan | (Ghana) | MF | 21 July 1986 (age 40) | Stabæk | 2016 | 2018 | 112 | 3 |
| 31 | Jordan Domínguez | (Spain) | MF | 31 January 1995 (age 31) | Real Murcia | 2018 | 2018+1 | 13 | 1 |
| 36 | Eetu Vertainen | (Finland) | MF | 11 May 1999 (age 27) | Klubi 04 | 2017 | 2018+1 | 29 | 7 |
| 50 | Santeri Väänänen | (Finland) | DF | 1 January 2002 (age 24) | Klubi 04 | 2018 | | 1 | 0 |
Forwards
| 7 | Klauss | (Brazil) | FW | 1 March 1997 (age 29) | loan from Hoffenheim | 2018 | 2018 | 42 | 24 |
| 9 | Riku Riski | (Finland) | FW | 16 August 1989 (age 37) | Odd | 2018 | 2019 | 33 | 8 |
| 11 | Akseli Pelvas | (Finland) | FW | 8 February 1989 (age 37) | Falkenbergs FF | 2016 | 2019 | 190 | 75 |
| 17 | Nikolai Alho | (Finland) | FW | 12 March 1993 (age 33) | Halmstads BK | 2018 | 2018 | 167 | 24 |
| 38 | Enoch Banza | (Finland) | FW | 4 February 2000 (age 26) | Klubi 04 | 2017 | 2019+1 | 15 | 1 |
| 39 | Macauley Chrisantus | (Nigeria) | FW | 20 August 1990 (age 36) | Real Murcia | 2018 | 2018+1 | 12 | 1 |
| 77 | Evans Mensah | (Ghana) | FW | 9 February 1998 (age 28) | Inter Allies | 2017 | 2019+1 | 75 | 17 |
Left during the season
| 10 | Moshtagh Yaghoubi | (Finland) | MF | 8 November 1994 (age 32) | Spartaks Jūrmala | 2017 | 2018 | 59 | 14 |
| 27 | Filip Valenčič | (Slovenia) | MF | 7 January 1992 (age 34) | PS Kemi | 2016 | 2019 | 43 | 14 |
| 74 | Amr Gamal | (Egypt) | FW | 3 August 1991 (age 35) | loan from Al Ahly | 2018 | August 2018 | 15 | 1 |

=== On loan ===
Note: Flags indicate national team as defined under FIFA eligibility rules; some limited exceptions apply. Players may hold more than one non-FIFA nationality.

| No. / Pos. / Nation / Player; 34 / FW / FIN / Lassi Lappalainen (on loan at RoPS until end of season) | No. / Pos. / Nation / Player |

== Transfers ==
=== Winter ===
In: Note: Flags indicate national team as defined under FIFA eligibility rules; some limited exceptions apply. Players may hold more than one non-FIFA nationality.

| No. | Pos. | Nation | Player |
|---|---|---|---|
| 5 | DF | FIN | Daniel O'Shaughnessy (from (England) Cheltenham Town) |
| 7 | FW | BRA | Klauss (loan from (Germany) Hoffenheim) |
| 9 | FW | FIN | Riku Riski (from (Norway) Odds BK) |
| 17 | FW | FIN | Nikolai Alho (from (Sweden) Halmstads BK) |
| 18 | DF | FIN | Roni Peiponen (from (Norway) Molde) |
| 74 | FW | EGY | Amr Gamal (loan from (Egypt) Al Ahly) |
| 88 | GK | RUS | Maksim Rudakov (loan from (Russia) Zenit St.Petersburg) |
| — | FW | CMR | Ariel Ngueukam (from (Finland) Ilves) |
| — | MF | FIN | Jaakko Oksanen (from (Finland) Klubi-04) |

Out: Note: Flags indicate national team as defined under FIFA eligibility rules; some limited exceptions apply. Players may hold more than one non-FIFA nationality.

| No. | Pos. | Nation | Player |
|---|---|---|---|
| 9 | FW | GAM | Demba Savage (to (Turkey) BB Erzurumspor) |
| 10 | MF | JPN | Atomu Tanaka (to (Japan) Cerezo Osaka) |
| 16 | DF | FIN | Aapo Halme (to (England) Leeds United). |
| 17 | FW | GAM | Ousman Jallow |
| 19 | MF | FIN | Lucas Lingman (to (Finland) RoPS) |
| 20 | MF | NGR | Vincent Onovo (to (Hungary) Újpest) |
| 21 | GK | GER | Thomas Dähne (to (Poland) Wisla Plock) |
| 28 | MF | FIN | Rasmus Schüller (loan return to (United States) Minnesota United) |
| 33 | DF | FIN | Henrik Ölander (to (Finland) PS Kemi) |
| — | MF | FIN | Jaakko Oksanen (to (England) Brentford) |
| — | FW | CMR | Ariel Ngueukam (to (Qatar) Al-Khor) |

=== Summer ===
In: Note: Flags indicate national team as defined under FIFA eligibility rules; some limited exceptions apply. Players may hold more than one non-FIFA nationality.

| No. | Pos. | Nation | Player |
|---|---|---|---|
| 21 | DF | FIN | Mikko Sumusalo (from (Germany) Chemnitzer FC) |
| 31 | MF | ESP | Jordan Domínguez (from (Spain) Real Murcia) |
| 37 | FW | NGR | Macauley Chrisantus (from (Spain) Real Murcia) |

Out: Note: Flags indicate national team as defined under FIFA eligibility rules; some limited exceptions apply. Players may hold more than one non-FIFA nationality.

| No. | Pos. | Nation | Player |
|---|---|---|---|
| 27 | MF | SLO | Filip Valenčič (to (Norway) Stabæk) |
| 74 | FW | EGY | Amr Gamal (loan return to (Egypt) Al Ahly) |

=== Released ===
| Date | Position | Nationality | Name | Joined | Date |
|---|---|---|---|---|---|
| 16 October 2018 | MF | (Finland) | Moshtagh Yaghoubi | SJK | |

== Competitions ==
=== Veikkausliiga ===
The 2018 Veikkausliiga season began on 7 April 2018 and ends on 27 October 2018.

==== League table ====
| Pos | Team | Pld | W | D | L | GF | GA | GD | Pts | Qualification or relegation |
|---|---|---|---|---|---|---|---|---|---|---|
| 1 | HJK (C) | 33 | 24 | 6 | 3 | 61 | 19 | +42 | 78 | Qualification for the Champions League first qualifying round (Note: HJK qualified for the Champions League first qualifying round) |
| 2 | RoPS | 33 | 18 | 8 | 7 | 42 | 25 | +17 | 62 | Qualification for the Europa League first qualifying round |
| 3 | KuPS | 33 | 17 | 7 | 9 | 56 | 37 | +19 | 58 | Qualification for the Europa League first qualifying round |
| 4 | Honka | 33 | 15 | 13 | 5 | 51 | 33 | +18 | 58 | |
| 5 | Ilves | 33 | 14 | 7 | 12 | 45 | 41 | +4 | 49 | |

Source: Veikkausliiga (in Finnish), Soccerway
Rules for classification: 1) Points; 2) Goal difference; 3) Goals scored; 4) Head-to-head points; 5) Head-to-head goal difference; 6) Head-to-head away goals scored; 7) Play-off
(Note: Play-off is only played if need to decide champion, teams for relegation or UEFA competition and will be played on a neutral ground).
(C) Champions

==== Results summary ====
| Overall | | | | | | | | Home | | | | | | Away | | | | | |
| Pld | W | D | L | GF | GA | GD | Pts | W | D | L | GF | GA | GD | W | D | L | GF | GA | GD |
|---|---|---|---|---|---|---|---|---|---|---|---|---|---|---|---|---|---|---|---|
| 33 | 24 | 6 | 3 | 61 | 19 | +42 | 78 | 13 | 2 | 2 | 38 | 10 | +28 | 11 | 4 | 1 | 23 | 9 | +14 |

Last updated: 27 October 2018.
Source: See Results

==== Results by matchday ====
| Round | 1 | 2 | 3 | 4 | 5 | 6 | 7 | 8 | 9 | 10 | 11 | 12 | 13 | 14 | 15 | 16 | 17 | 18 | 19 | 20 | 21 | 22 | 23 | 24 | 25 | 26 | 27 | 28 | 29 | 30 | 31 | 32 | 33 |
|---|---|---|---|---|---|---|---|---|---|---|---|---|---|---|---|---|---|---|---|---|---|---|---|---|---|---|---|---|---|---|---|---|---|
| Ground | H | H | A | H | A | A | H | A | H | H | H | H | A | H | A | A | H | A | H | H | A | H | H | A | H | H | A | H | A | A | H | H | A |
| Result | W | W | W | L | D | W | L | W | W | W | W | W | W | W | D | D | W | L | W | W | W | D | D | W | W | W | W | W | W | D | W | W | W |

Updated to match(es) played on 27 October 2018. Source: See Results
A = Away; H = Home; W = Win; D = Draw; L = Loss

==== Results ====
| 8 April 2018 1 | HJK | 3 – 1 | Ilves | Helsinki |
| 17:00 EEST (UTC+3) | Klauss 77' (pen.); Valenčič 84', 90+4' | Report | T.Siira 10'; Miettunen (yellow card) 22'; Aspegren (yellow card) 90+1' | Stadium: Telia 5G -areena Attendance: 3,317; Referee: Toni Pohjoismäki |

| 14 April 2018 2 | IFK Mariehamn | 0 – 1 | HJK | Mariehamn |
| 16:00 EEST (UTC+3) | Silverholt (yellow card) 36'; Tatomirović (yellow card) 59' | Report | Peiponen (yellow card) 36'; Valenčič (yellow card) 41'; Obilor (yellow card) 48'; Riski 69'; O'Shaughnessy (yellow card) 84' | Stadium: Wiklöf Holding Arena; Attendance: 1,445; Referee: Oskari Hämäläinen |

| 18 April 2018 3 | SJK | 0 – 1 | HJK | Seinäjoki |
| 18:30 EEST (UTC+3) | Hetemaj (yellow card) 57' | Report | Klauss 33'; Yaghoubi (yellow card) 51'; Obilor (yellow card) 71' | Stadium: OmaSP Stadion; Attendance: 2,110; Referee: Mattias Gestranius |

| 21 April 2018 4 | HJK | 1 – 2 | KuPS | Helsinki |
| 16:00 EEST (UTC+3) | Valenčič 5'; Patronen (yellow card) 43' | Report | Karjalainen (yellow card) 12'; Savolainen 36'; Murillo (yellow card) 54'; Rexhepi (yellow card) 76'; I.Niskanen 81' (yellow card) 81'; Virtanen (yellow card) 90+3' | Stadium: Telia 5G -areena Attendance: 5,073; Referee: Petri Viljanen |

| 25 April 2018 5 | FC Inter Turku | 0 – 0 | HJK | Turku |
| 18:30 EEST (UTC+3) | Penninkangas (yellow card) 9' | Report | Yaghoubi (yellow card) 90+3' | Stadium: Veritas Stadion; Attendance: 2,016; Referee: Atte Jussila |

| 29 April 2018 6 | VPS | 1 – 2 | HJK | Vaasa |
| 17:00 EEST (UTC+3) | Strandvall 18' (yellow card) 61'; E.Ciss (yellow card) 30'; Lahti (yellow card) 35'; I.Gueye (yellow card) 78' | Report | Rafinha (yellow card) 35'; E.Vertainen 54'; Mensah (yellow card) 59'; Klauss 65' (pen.) (yellow card) 72' | Stadium: Hietalahti Stadium; Attendance: 1,712; Referee: Ville Nevalainen |

| 3 May 2018 7 | HJK | 1 – 2 | Lahti | Helsinki |
| 18:30 EEST (UTC+3) | Pelvas 53' | Report | Dmitrijev 36'; T.Jäntti 67' | Stadium: Telia 5G -areena Attendance: 5,238; Referee: Dennis Antamo |

| 7 May 2018 8 | PS Kemi | 1 – 2 | HJK | Oulu |
| 18:00 EEST (UTC+3) | K.Isaksson 41' (yellow card) 52'; A.Vidjeskog (yellow card) 60'; Abubakar (yellow card) 62'; Guevara (yellow card) 86' | Report | Alho 39'; Yaghoubi (yellow card) 45'; Klauss 68' | Stadium: Raatti Stadium; Attendance: 710; Referee: Joni Hyytiä |

| 18 May 2018 9 | TPS | 0 – 1 | HJK | Turku |
| 18:30 EEST (UTC+3) | O.Jakonen (yellow card) 70'; O.Valakari (yellow card) 76' | Report | Valenčič 43' (yellow card) 90+1'; Obilor (yellow card) 50'; Yaghoubi (yellow card) 59'; Annan (yellow card) 74' | Stadium: Veritas Stadion; Attendance: 3,884; Referee: Marko Grönholm |

| 22 May 2018 10 | HJK | 3 – 0 | Inter Turku | Helsinki |
| 18:30 EEST (UTC+3) | Klauss 47', 58'; Patronen (yellow card) 69'; Valenčič 76' | Report | Penninkangas (yellow card) 68'; Mansally (yellow card) 81' | Stadium: Telia 5G -areena Attendance: 4,327; Referee: Ville Nevalainen |

| 26 May 2018 11 | HJK | 3 – 2 | Honka | Helsinki |
| 15:00 EEST (UTC+3) | Pirinen (yellow card) 29'; Yaghoubi (yellow card) 37' (goal) 80'; Obilor (yellow card) 37'; Rafinha (yellow card) 61'; Annan (yellow card) 62'; Dahlström (yellow card) 69'; Klauss 73'; O'Shaughnessy 78' | Report | Kandji 11'; Murray (red card) 17'; Ivanov (yellow card) 62' (yellow-red card) 74'; Laevuo 71' | Stadium: Telia 5G -areena Attendance: 5,620; Referee: Antti Munukka |

| 29 May 2018 12 | HJK | 4 – 0 | SJK | Helsinki |
| 18:30 EEST (UTC+3) | Alho 7'; Annan (yellow card) 21'; Klauss 68', 70'; E.Vertainen 82' | Report | Ayarna (yellow card) 12'; J.Lautamaja (yellow card) 55'; Hetemaj (yellow card) 66'; D.O'Brien (yellow card) 90+1' | Stadium: Telia 5G -areena Attendance: 3,890; Referee: Jari Järvinen |

| 1 June 2018 13 | RoPS | 1 – 2 | HJK | Rovaniemi |
| 18:30 EEST (UTC+3) | L.Järvenpää 90+3' | Report | Klauss 52', 88' | Stadium: Rovaniemen keskuskenttä Attendance: 4,013; Referee: Ville Nevalainen |

| 12 June 2018 14 | HJK | 2 – 0 | IFK Mariehamn | Helsinki |
| 18:30 EEST (UTC+3) | Alho 4'; Yaghoubi (yellow card) 31'; Klauss 80' (pen.) | Report | Mantilla (yellow card) 77' | Stadium: Telia 5G -areena Attendance: 3,209; Referee: Jari Järvinen |

| 16 June 2018 15 | Ilves | 0 – 0 | HJK | Tampere |
| 18:30 EEST (UTC+3) | Aspegren (yellow card) 36'; Noubissi (yellow card) 90+3' | Report | Annan (yellow card) 45' (yellow-red card) 83'; Rafinha (yellow card) 52'; Obilor (yellow card) 90+7' | Stadium: Tammelan Stadion; Attendance: 4,762; Referee: Oskari Hämäläinen |

| 20 June 2018 16 | KuPS | 2 – 2 | HJK | Kuopio |
| 18:30 EEST (UTC+3) | Karjalainen 21'; Obilor 56' (o.g.) | Report | Mensah 17'; Yaghoubi (yellow card) 79'; Patronen (yellow card) 84'; Gamal 90+3' | Stadium: Kuopio Football Stadium; Attendance: 3,647; Referee: Dennis Antamo |

| 25 June 2018 17 | HJK | 5 – 0 | VPS | Helsinki |
| 18:30 EEST (UTC+3) | O'Shaughnessy 22'; Mensah 25', 57'; Patronen (yellow card) 70'; Auvinen 74' (o.g.); Peiponen 90+1' | Report | Gueye (yellow card) 89' | Stadium: Telia 5G -areena Attendance: 3,051; Referee: Joni Hyytiä |

| 29 June 2018 18 | Lahti | 2 – 1 | HJK | Lahti |
| 19:00 EEST (UTC+3) | Hertsi (yellow card) 22'; Hostikka 37'; Pirinen 70' (o.g.) | Report | Valenčič (yellow card) 24'; Alho (yellow card) 64'; Klauss 84' | Stadium: Lahti Stadium; Attendance: 2,824; Referee: Ville Nevalainen |

| 4 July 2018 19 | HJK | 2 – 0 | PS Kemi | Helsinki |
| 18:30 EEST (UTC+3) | Yaghoubi 62' (yellow card) 70'; Mensah 83' | Report | Esposito (yellow card) 61'; Lipin (yellow card) 81' | Stadium: Telia 5G -areena Attendance: 2,806; Referee: Oskari Hämäläinen |

| 14 July 2018 20 | HJK | 2 – 1 | TPS | Helsinki |
| 19:00 EEST (UTC+3) | Patronen 51'; Riski 86' | Report | Tenho (yellow card) 39'; Ahde 90+1' | Stadium: Telia 5G -areena Attendance: 2,311; Referee: Atte Jussila |

| 28 July 2018 21 | Honka | 1 – 2 | HJK | Espoo |
| 17:00 EEST (UTC+3) | Kabashi (yellow card) 24'; Kandji (yellow card) 62' (goal) 70' | Report | Alho 27'; Sumusalo (yellow card) 45'; Peiponen (yellow card) 45+1' (yellow-red card) 47'; Klauss (yellow card) 57'; Riski 82' (yellow card) 83'; Banza (yellow card) 90' | Stadium: Tapiolan Urheilupuisto; Attendance: 3,302; Referee: Ville Nevalainen |

| 4 August 2018 22 | HJK | 2 – 2 | RoPS | Helsinki |
| 17:00 EEST (UTC+3) | Annan (yellow card) 14'; Dahlström 45'; Obilor (yellow card) 47'; Klauss 88' | Report | Taiwo 54'; Hambo 81' | Stadium: Telia 5G -areena Attendance: 3,012; Referee: Jari Järvinen |

| 19 August 2018 23 | HJK | 0 – 0 | PS Kemi | Helsinki |
| 13:00 EEST (UTC+3) | Mensah (yellow card) 16' | Report | | Stadium: Telia 5G -areena Attendance: 2,812; Referee: Dennis Antamo |

| 26 August 2018 24 | KuPS | 0 – 1 | HJK | Kuopio |
| 18:30 EEST (UTC+3) | Ayarna (yellow card) 85' | Report | Annan (yellow card) 24'; Klauss 64' | Stadium: Kuopio Football Stadium; Attendance: 3,197; Referee: Mattias Gestranius |

| 2 September 2018 25 | HJK | 3 – 0 | Inter Turku | Helsinki |
| 18:30 EEST (UTC+3) | Rafinha 28' (pen.); Domínguez 34'; Klauss 90+3' | Report | Kamy (yellow card) 27' | Stadium: Telia 5G -areena Attendance: 3,011; Referee: Ville Nevalainen |

| 13 September 2018 26 | HJK | 2 – 0 | IFK Mariehamn | Helsinki |
| 18:30 EEST (UTC+3) | Alho 27'; Domínguez (yellow card) 59'; Obilor (yellow card) 69'; Yaghoubi (yellow card) 77' (red card) 77'; Klauss 88' | Report | Murnane (yellow card) 53' | Stadium: Telia 5G -areena Attendance: 2,678; Referee: Joni Hyytiä |

| 17 September 2018 27 | Lahti | 0 – 2 | HJK | Lahti |
| 18:30 EEST (UTC+3) | Hostikka (yellow card) 79'; Stênio (yellow card) 90+1' | Report | Klauss 34'; Riski 66' | Stadium: Lahti Stadium; Attendance: 1,740; Referee: Anntamo Dennis |

| 21 September 2018 28 | HJK | 3 – 0 | RoPS | Helsinki |
| 18:30 EEST (UTC+3) | Pirinen (yellow card) 28'; Klauss 30'; Vertainen 56', 90+1'; Jalasto (yellow card) 73'; Patronen (yellow card) 87'; Riski (yellow card) 87' | Report | Lingman (yellow card) 74'; Geffrard (red card) 90' | Stadium: Telia 5G -areena Attendance: 4,021; Referee: Atte Jussila |

| 26 September 2018 29 | Ilves | 1 – 2 | HJK | Tampere |
| 18:30 EEST (UTC+3) | Patronen 27' (o.g.); Aspegren (yellow card) 57'; Tomas (yellow card) 64'; Hilander (yellow card) 90+1' | Report | Jalasto 15'; Obilor 37' (yellow card) 63'; Annan (yellow card) 67'; Alho (yellow card) 77' | Stadium: Tammelan Stadion; Attendance: 3,211; Referee: Ville Nevalainen |

| 29 September 2018 30 | Honka | 0 – 0 | HJK | Espoo |
| 15:00 EEST (UTC+3) | Aalto (yellow card) 90+4' | Report | Domínguez (yellow card) 35'; Patronen (yellow card) 63' | Stadium: Tapiolan Urheilupuisto; Attendance: 3,198; Referee: Mattias Gestranius |

| 7 October 2018 31 | HJK | 1 – 0 | VPS | Helsinki |
| 17:00 EEST (UTC+3) | Pirinen 52'; Rudakov (yellow card) 82'; Riski (yellow card) 90+4' | Report | Ojamaa (yellow card) 50'; Gueye (yellow card) 69'; Lahti (yellow card) 88' | Stadium: Telia 5G -areena Attendance: 4,152; Referee: Mattias Gestranius |

| 21 October 2018 32 | HJK | 1 – 0 | SJK | Helsinki |
| 14:30 EEST (UTC+3) | Obilor (yellow card) 45'; Klauss 37' | Report | Oliynyk (yellow card) 40'; Kadio (yellow card) 49'; Sundman (yellow card) 85' | Stadium: Telia 5G -areena Attendance: 5,723; Referee: Dennis Antamo |

| 27 October 2018 33 | TPS | 0 – 4 | HJK | Turku |
| 15:00 EEST (UTC+3) | Jakonen (yellow card) 34' (yellow-red card) 42'; McKendry (yellow card) 61' | Report | Dahlström 20' (yellow card) 80'; Klauss 29'; Riski 52', 86' | Stadium: Veritas Stadion; Attendance: 3,025; Referee: Atte Jussila |

=== Finnish Cup ===
==== Sixth Round ====
| Team | Pld | W | D | L | GF | GA | GD | Pts |
|---|---|---|---|---|---|---|---|---|
| FC Honka | 5 | 5 | 0 | 0 | 15 | 3 | +12 | 15 |
| HJK Helsinki | 5 | 4 | 0 | 1 | 19 | 4 | +15 | 12 |
| HIFK Fotboll | 5 | 2 | 1 | 2 | 10 | 7 | +3 | 7 |
| KTP | 5 | 2 | 0 | 3 | 10 | 10 | 0 | 6 |
| IF Gnistan | 5 | 1 | 1 | 3 | 2 | 17 | −15 | 4 |
| PEPO | 5 | 0 | 0 | 5 | 3 | 18 | −15 | 0 |

| 20 January 2018 1 | HJK | 4 – 1 | PEPO | Helsinki |
| 14:00 EET (UTC+2) | Pelvas 6'; Valenčič 25'; Rafinha 65'; Yaghoubi 82' | Report | Salazar 43' | Stadium: Talin jalkapallohalli Attendance: 339; Referee: Oliver Reitala |

| 26 January 2018 2 | Gnistan | 0 – 8 | HJK | Helsinki |
| 18:30 EET (UTC+2) | | Report | Jalasto 9'; Yaghoubi 16'; E.Vertainen 20', 47', 49'; Dahlström 66'; Patronen 79'; Banza 90' | Stadium: Oulunkylä |

| 17 February 2018 3 | HJK | 5 – 1 | KTP | Helsinki |
| 14:00 EET (UTC+2) | Pelvas 17', 24', 74'; Obilor 41'; Yaghoubi 90+3' | Report | M.Kolsi (yellow card) 38'; Jean Carlo 72' | Stadium: Talin jalkapallohalli Attendance: 368; Referee: Joni Hyytiä |

| 24 February 2018 4 | HJK | 1 – 0 | HIFK | Helsinki |
| 14:00 EET (UTC+2) | Yaghoubi (yellow card) 7'; Valenčič 72' | Report | Bäckman (yellow card) 37'; R.Heidari (yellow card) 53'; Terävä (yellow card) 64'; Hänninen (yellow card) 88' | Stadium: Talin jalkapallohalli Attendance: 700; Referee: Oskari Hämäläinen |

| 10 March 2018 5 | Honka | 2 – 1 | HJK | Helsinki |
| 15:00 EET (UTC+2) | M.Ömer 34'; Hervás 90+2' | Report | Jalasto (yellow card) 54'; Yaghoubi 64' | Stadium: Esport Arena; Referee: Jari Järvinen |

==== Knockout stage ====
| 18 March 2017 Playoffs | HJK | 4 – 1 | VPS | Helsinki |
| 14:00 EET (UTC+2) | Riski (yellow card) 42'; O'Shaughnessy 64'; Yaghoubi 68'; Klauss 85'; Mensah 89' | Report | David (yellow card) 22'; Morrissey (yellow card) 59'; Jama (yellow card) 66'; Ojamaa (yellow card) 77'; Douglas Caé 87' | Stadium: Telia 5G -areena Attendance: 467; Referee: Atte Jussila |

| 29 March 2018 Quarterfinal | HJK | 2 – 0 | KuPS | Helsinki |
| 18:30 EEST (UTC+3) | Riski 11'; Klauss 36'; Yaghoubi (yellow card) 40'; Dahlström (yellow card) 74'; Obilor (yellow card) 85' | Report | H.Coulibaly (yellow card) 40'; Murillo (yellow card) 45'; Matulevičius (yellow card) 54'; Saxman (yellow card) 58'; J.Nissinen (yellow card) 81' | Stadium: Telia 5G -areena Attendance: 819; Referee: Marko Grönholm |

| 2 April 2018 Semifinal | HJK | 2 – 1 | Honka | Helsinki |
| 18:30 EEST (UTC+3) | Riski 35'; Yaghoubi (yellow card) 51'; Jalasto (yellow card) 62'; Alho 74'; M.Uusitalo (yellow card) 86' | Report | B.Martin (yellow card) 51'; R.Ivanov (yellow card) 72'; Rahimi 90+4' | Stadium: Telia 5G -areena Attendance: 679; Referee: Mattias Gestranius |

==== Final ====
| 12 May 2018 | HJK | 0 – 1 | Inter Turku | Helsinki |
| 15:00 EET (UTC+2) | Patronen (yellow card) 26'; Annan (yellow card) 42' | Report | Mäntylä (yellow card) 45'; N.Mäenpää (yellow card) 60'; Nyman (yellow card) 65'; Kuningas 82'; Mansally (yellow card) 90+3'; Mäkitalo (yellow card) 90+5' | Stadium: Telia 5G -areena Attendance: 3,540; Referee: Mikko Leino |

=== UEFA Champions League ===
==== Qualifying rounds ====
| 10 July 2018 First qualifying round 1st leg | Víkingur Gøta (Faroe Islands) | 1 – 2 | (Finland) HJK | Toftir, Faroe Islands |
| 21:00 EEST (UTC+3) | Djurhuus (yellow card) 47'; G.Vatnhamar 51'; Hansen (yellow card) 63'; Cașcaval (yellow card) 84'; Đorđević (yellow card) 90+1' | Report | Dahlström 9'; Gregersen 29' (o.g.); Patronen (yellow card) 84'; Yaghoubi (yellow card) 87' | Stadium: Svangaskarð; Attendance: 300; Referee: Robert Hennessy (Republic of Ireland) |

| 17 July 2018 First qualifying round 2nd leg | HJK (Finland) | 3 – 1 (5 – 2 agg.) | (Faroe Islands) Víkingur Gøta | Helsinki, Finland |
| 19:00 EEST (UTC+3) | De Mello 1'; Mensah 10'; Yaghoubi 19' | Report | G.Vatnhamar 21'; Djurhuus (yellow card) 38'; Cașcaval (yellow card) 54' | Stadium: Telia 5G -areena Attendance: 5,125; Referee: Duje Strukan (Croatia) |

| 25 July 2018 Second qualifying round 1st leg | BATE Borisov (Belarus) | 0 – 0 | (Finland) HJK | Barysaw, Belarus |
| 20:00 EEST (UTC+3) | Signevich (yellow card) 62' | Report | Obilor (yellow card) 62'; O'Shaughnessy (yellow card) 75'; Annan (yellow card) 90+5' | Stadium: Borisov Arena; Attendance: 11,567; Referee: Marco Di Bello (Italy) |

| 1 August 2018 Second qualifying round 2nd leg | HJK (Finland) | 1 – 2 (1 – 2 agg.) | (Belarus) BATE Borisov | Helsinki, Finland |
| 19:00 EEST (UTC+3) | Yaghoubi 28' (yellow card) 75'; Patronen (yellow card) 73'; Obilor (yellow card) 90+3' | Report | Rafinha 20' (o.g.); Stasevich 24' (yellow card) 58'; Skavysh (yellow card) 90'; Valadzko (yellow card) 90+3' | Stadium: Telia 5G -areena Referee: Jonathan Lardot (Belgium) |

=== UEFA Europa League ===
==== Qualifying rounds ====
| 9 August 2018 Third qualifying round 1st leg | Olimpija Ljubljana (Slovenia) | 3 – 0 | (Finland) HJK | Ljubljana, Slovenia |
| 21:00 EEST (UTC+3) | Issah 38', 58'; Kronaveter 49' (pen.); Črnic (red card) 83'; Zarifović (yellow card) 83' | Report | Yaghoubi (yellow card) 45+2'; Patronen (yellow card) 49' | Stadium: Stožice Stadium; Attendance: 4,900; Referee: Benoît Millot (France) |

| 16 August 2018 Third qualifying round 2nd leg | HJK (Finland) | 1 – 4 (1 – 7 agg.) | (Slovenia) Olimpija Ljubljana | Helsinki, Finland |
| 19:00 EEST (UTC+3) | Peiponen (yellow card) 55'; Sumusalo (yellow card) 79'; Chrisantus 85'; Vertainen (yellow card) 88' | Report | Issah 20'; Avramovski 72'; Rafinha 75' (o.g.); Brkić 90+2' (pen.) | Stadium: Telia 5G -areena Referee: Ievgenii Aranovskyi (Ukraine) |

== Squad statistics ==
As of Match played 27 October 2018

=== Appearances and goals ===
| No. | Pos | Nat | Player | Total | | Veikkausliiga | | Finnish Cup | | Champions League | | Europa League | |
| No. | Pos | Nat | Player | Apps | Goals | Apps | Goals | Apps | Goals | Apps | Goals | Apps | Goals |
|---|---|---|---|---|---|---|---|---|---|---|---|---|---|
| 1 | GK | (Finland) FIN | Markus Uusitalo | 10 | 0 | 6 | 0 | 4 | 0 | 0 | 0 | 0 | 0 |
| 4 | DF | (Finland) FIN | Hannu Patronen | 26 | 2 | 16+3 | 1 | 2 | 1 | 4 | 0 | 1 | 0 |
| 5 | DF | (Finland) FIN | Daniel O'Shaughnessy | 24 | 3 | 15+2 | 2 | 4+1 | 1 | 2 | 0 | 0 | 0 |
| 6 | DF | (Finland) FIN | Juha Pirinen | 25 | 1 | 13+6 | 1 | 4+2 | 0 | 0 | 0 | 0 | 0 |
| 7 | FW | (Brazil) BRA | Klauss | 42 | 24 | 28+5 | 21 | 2+1 | 2 | 4 | 1 | 2 | 0 |
| 8 | DF | (Brazil) BRA | Rafinha | 36 | 2 | 21+3 | 1 | 5+1 | 1 | 4 | 0 | 2 | 0 |
| 9 | FW | (Finland) FIN | Riku Riski | 33 | 8 | 16+6 | 6 | 4+1 | 2 | 4 | 0 | 2 | 0 |
| 11 | FW | (Finland) FIN | Akseli Pelvas | 15 | 5 | 4+3 | 1 | 6+2 | 4 | 0 | 0 | 0 | 0 |
| 14 | MF | (Finland) FIN | Sebastian Dahlström | 46 | 4 | 28+3 | 2 | 7+2 | 1 | 4 | 1 | 1+1 | 0 |
| 15 | DF | (Finland) FIN | Ville Jalasto | 24 | 2 | 11+4 | 1 | 9 | 1 | 0 | 0 | 0 | 0 |
| 17 | FW | (Finland) FIN | Nikolai Alho | 38 | 6 | 23+4 | 5 | 3+4 | 1 | 0+2 | 0 | 1+1 | 0 |
| 18 | DF | (Finland) FIN | Roni Peiponen | 14 | 1 | 7+4 | 1 | 1 | 0 | 1 | 0 | 1 | 0 |
| 21 | DF | (Finland) FIN | Mikko Sumusalo | 11 | 0 | 5+2 | 0 | 0 | 0 | 1+1 | 0 | 2 | 0 |
| 22 | MF | (Ghana) GHA | Anthony Annan | 41 | 0 | 23+4 | 0 | 7+1 | 0 | 4 | 0 | 2 | 0 |
| 25 | DF | (Finland) FIN | Valtteri Vesiaho | 16 | 1 | 9+3 | 0 | 3 | 1 | 0+1 | 0 | 0 | 0 |
| 31 | MF | (Spain) ESP | Jordan Domínguez | 13 | 1 | 10+1 | 1 | 0 | 0 | 0 | 0 | 1+1 | 0 |
| 32 | DF | (Nigeria) NGR | Faith Friday Obilor | 43 | 2 | 29 | 1 | 8 | 1 | 4 | 0 | 2 | 0 |
| 36 | MF | (Finland) FIN | Eetu Vertainen | 26 | 7 | 10+8 | 4 | 1+4 | 3 | 0+2 | 0 | 0+1 | 0 |
| 38 | FW | (Finland) FIN | Enoch Banza | 7 | 1 | 3+1 | 0 | 2 | 1 | 0+1 | 0 | 0 | 0 |
| 39 | FW | (Nigeria) NGR | Macauley Chrisantus | 12 | 1 | 3+6 | 0 | 0 | 0 | 0+1 | 0 | 0+2 | 1 |
| 50 | MF | (Finland) FIN | Santeri Väänänen | 1 | 0 | 0+1 | 0 | 0 | 0 | 0 | 0 | 0 | 0 |
| 77 | FW | (Ghana) GHA | Evans Mensah | 32 | 6 | 13+7 | 4 | 6 | 1 | 4 | 1 | 2 | 0 |
| 88 | GK | (Russia) RUS | Maksim Rudakov | 38 | 0 | 27 | 0 | 5 | 0 | 4 | 0 | 2 | 0 |
Players from Klubi-04 who appeared:
| 16 | DF | (Finland) FIN | Kalle Katz | 1 | 0 | 1 | 0 | 0 | 0 | 0 | 0 | 0 | 0 |
| 42 | DF | (Finland) FIN | Samu Laitinen | 1 | 0 | 0+1 | 0 | 0 | 0 | 0 | 0 | 0 | 0 |
| 57 | DF | (Finland) FIN | Kevin Kouassivi-Benissan | 2 | 0 | 2 | 0 | 0 | 0 | 0 | 0 | 0 | 0 |
| 61 | DF | (Finland) FIN | Otto Ollikainen | 2 | 0 | 0+1 | 0 | 0 | 0 | 0+1 | 0 | 0 | 0 |
Players away from the club on loan:
Players who left HJK during the season:
| 9 | FW | (The Gambia) GAM | Demba Savage | 1 | 0 | 0 | 0 | 1 | 0 | 0 | 0 | 0 | 0 |
| 10 | MF | (Finland) FIN | Moshtagh Yaghoubi | 36 | 9 | 19+3 | 2 | 8+1 | 5 | 4 | 2 | 1 | 0 |
| 27 | MF | (Slovenia) SLO | Filip Valenčič | 25 | 7 | 13+5 | 5 | 4+2 | 2 | 0+1 | 0 | 0 | 0 |
| 74 | FW | (Egypt) EGY | Amr Gamal | 15 | 1 | 4+8 | 1 | 0+3 | 0 | 0 | 0 | 0 | 0 |

=== Goal scorers ===
| Place | Position | Nation | Number | Name | Veikkausliiga | Finnish Cup | Champions League | Europa League | Total |
|---|---|---|---|---|---|---|---|---|---|
| 1 | FW | (Brazil) | 7 | Klauss | 21 | 2 | 1 | 0 | 24 |
| 2 | MF | (Finland) | 10 | Moshtagh Yaghoubi | 2 | 5 | 2 | 0 | 9 |
| 3 | FW | (Finland) | 9 | Riku Riski | 6 | 2 | 0 | 0 | 8 |
| 4 | MF | (Slovenia) | 27 | Filip Valenčič | 5 | 2 | 0 | 0 | 7 |
| 4 | MF | (Finland) | 36 | Eetu Vertainen | 4 | 3 | 0 | 0 | 7 |
| 6 | FW | (Finland) | 17 | Nikolai Alho | 5 | 1 | 0 | 0 | 6 |
| 6 | FW | (Ghana) | 77 | Evans Mensah | 4 | 1 | 1 | 0 | 6 |
| 8 | FW | (Finland) | 11 | Akseli Pelvas | 1 | 4 | 0 | 0 | 5 |
| 9 | MF | (Finland) | 14 | Sebastian Dahlström | 2 | 1 | 1 | 0 | 4 |
| 10 | DF | (Finland) | 5 | Daniel O'Shaughnessy | 2 | 1 | 0 | 0 | 3 |
| 11 | DF | (Finland) | 4 | Hannu Patronen | 1 | 1 | 0 | 0 | 2 |
| 11 | DF | (Brazil) | 8 | Rafinha | 1 | 1 | 0 | 0 | 2 |
| 11 | DF | (Finland) | 15 | Ville Jalasto | 1 | 1 | 0 | 0 | 2 |
| 11 | DF | (Nigeria) | 32 | Faith Friday Obilor | 1 | 1 | 0 | 0 | 2 |
| 11 | | | | Own goal | 1 | 0 | 1 | 0 | 2 |
| 16 | FW | (Egypt) | 74 | Amr Gamal | 1 | 0 | 0 | 0 | 1 |
| 16 | DF | (Finland) | 18 | Roni Peiponen | 1 | 0 | 0 | 0 | 1 |
| 16 | MF | (Spain) | 31 | Jordan Domínguez | 1 | 0 | 0 | 0 | 1 |
| 16 | DF | (Finland) | 6 | Juha Pirinen | 1 | 0 | 0 | 0 | 1 |
| 16 | FW | (Finland) | 38 | Enoch Banza | 0 | 1 | 0 | 0 | 1 |
| 16 | FW | (Nigeria) | 39 | Macauley Chrisantus | 0 | 0 | 0 | 1 | 1 |
| TOTALS | | | | | 61 | 27 | 6 | 1 | 95 |

=== Disciplinary record ===
| Number | Nation | Position | Name | Veikkausliiga | | Finnish Cup | | Champions League | | Europa League | | Total | |
| Number | Nation | Position | Name | Yellow card | Red card | Yellow card | Red card | Yellow card | Red card | Yellow card | Red card | Yellow card | Red card |
| 1 | (Finland) | GK | Markus Uusitalo | 0 | 0 | 1 | 0 | 0 | 0 | 0 | 0 | 1 | 0 |
| 4 | (Finland) | DF | Hannu Patronen | 6 | 0 | 1 | 0 | 2 | 0 | 1 | 0 | 10 | 0 |
| 5 | (Finland) | DF | Daniel O'Shaughnessy | 1 | 0 | 0 | 0 | 1 | 0 | 0 | 0 | 2 | 0 |
| 6 | (Finland) | DF | Juha Pirinen | 2 | 0 | 0 | 0 | 0 | 0 | 0 | 0 | 2 | 0 |
| 7 | (Brazil) | FW | Klauss | 2 | 0 | 0 | 0 | 0 | 0 | 0 | 0 | 2 | 0 |
| 8 | (Brazil) | DF | Rafinha | 3 | 0 | 0 | 0 | 0 | 0 | 0 | 0 | 3 | 0 |
| 9 | (Finland) | FW | Riku Riski | 3 | 0 | 1 | 0 | 0 | 0 | 0 | 0 | 4 | 0 |
| 14 | (Finland) | MF | Sebastian Dahlström | 2 | 0 | 1 | 0 | 0 | 0 | 0 | 0 | 3 | 0 |
| 15 | (Finland) | DF | Ville Jalasto | 1 | 0 | 2 | 0 | 0 | 0 | 0 | 0 | 3 | 0 |
| 17 | (Finland) | FW | Nikolai Alho | 2 | 0 | 0 | 0 | 0 | 0 | 0 | 0 | 2 | 0 |
| 18 | (Finland) | MF | Roni Peiponen | 3 | 1 | 0 | 0 | 0 | 0 | 1 | 0 | 4 | 1 |
| 21 | (Finland) | DF | Mikko Sumusalo | 1 | 0 | 0 | 0 | 0 | 0 | 1 | 0 | 2 | 0 |
| 22 | (Ghana) | MF | Anthony Annan | 8 | 1 | 1 | 0 | 1 | 0 | 0 | 0 | 10 | 1 |
| 31 | (Spain) | MF | Jordan Domínguez | 2 | 0 | 0 | 0 | 0 | 0 | 0 | 0 | 2 | 0 |
| 32 | (Nigeria) | DF | Faith Friday Obilor | 9 | 0 | 1 | 0 | 2 | 0 | 0 | 0 | 12 | 0 |
| 36 | (Finland) | MF | Eetu Vertainen | 0 | 0 | 0 | 0 | 0 | 0 | 1 | 0 | 1 | 0 |
| 38 | (Finland) | FW | Enoch Banza | 1 | 0 | 0 | 0 | 0 | 0 | 0 | 0 | 1 | 0 |
| 77 | (Ghana) | FW | Evans Mensah | 2 | 0 | 0 | 0 | 0 | 0 | 0 | 0 | 2 | 0 |
| 88 | (Russia) | GK | Maksim Rudakov | 1 | 0 | 0 | 0 | 0 | 0 | 0 | 0 | 1 | 0 |
Players who left HJK during the season:
| 10 | (Finland) | MF | Moshtagh Yaghoubi | 8 | 1 | 3 | 0 | 2 | 0 | 1 | 0 | 14 | 1 |
| 27 | (Slovenia) | MF | Filip Valenčič | 3 | 0 | 0 | 0 | 0 | 0 | 0 | 0 | 3 | 0 |
| TOTALS | | | | 60 | 3 | 11 | 0 | 8 | 0 | 5 | 0 | 84 | 3 |
