= Laitinen =

Laitinen is a Finnish surname. Notable people with the surname include:

- Arto Laitinen, Finnish philosopher
- Artturi Laitinen (1882–1959), Finnish schoolteacher and politician
- Diana Laitinen Carlsson, Swedish politician
- Haris Laitinen (born 1984), Swedish football player
- Ilkka Laitinen (1962–2019), Finnish military officer
- Jaana Laitinen-Pesola (born 1958), Finnish politician
- Jarno Laitinen (born 1988), Finnish ice hockey goaltender
- Juho Laitinen (1871–1946), Finnish farmer, cooperative organizer and politician
- Kalevi Laitinen, multiple people
- Kari Laitinen (born 1964), Finnish ice hockey player
- Leena Laitinen (born 1957), Finnish chess master
- Martti Laitinen (1929–2017), Finnish footballer
- Mika Laitinen (born 1973), Finnish ski jumper
- Nelli Laitinen (born 2002), Finnish ice hockey player
- Samu Laitinen (born 1999), Finnish footballer
- Taisto Laitinen (1933–2022), Finnish athlete
- Timo Laitinen (born 1972), Finnish sport shooter
