= 2017–18 Finnish Cup =

Tournament details
- Country: Finland

Final positions
- Champions: Inter Turku (2nd title)
- Runners-up: HJK

Tournament statistics
- Matches played: 99

The 2017–18 Finnish Cup (Suomen Cup) was the 64th season of the Finnish Cup. It was the second edition of the tournament to be played on a fall-spring schedule, running from July to September of the following year. The introduction of this new competition format meant that the Liiga Cup was discontinued.

The winner of the Men's Finnish Cup was awarded a cash prize of EUR 50,000 with the runners up receiving EUR 10,000. The winner also qualified for the 2019–20 UEFA Europa League. Times up to 28 October 2017 and from 25 March 2018 are EEST (UTC+3). Times from 29 October 2017 to 24 March 2018 are EET (UTC+2).

== Teams ==
Round	Dates	Clubs involved	Winners from previous round	New entries this round	Leagues entering this round
First round	25 Jul 2017 – 7 Aug 2017	8	−	8	Kakkonen and lower levels (12 teams)
Second round	21 Jul 2017 – 21 Aug 2017	40	4	16	Kakkonen and lower levels ( teams)
Third round	6 Sept 2017 – 19 Sept 2017	20	10	0	
Fourth round	26 Sept 2017 – 7 Oct 2017	8	4		
Fifth round (group stage)				–	
Quarter-finals		8		–	

== First round ==
The first and second rounds of the Cup will include all registered teams, with the exception of Veikkausliiga and Ykkönen teams, who will be included in the 30-team group stage early in 2017. The first rounds will include teams playing in the Kakkonen and below.

25 July 2017	NJS (3)	3–4 (a.e.t.)	FC Viikingit (3)	Nurmijärvi
19:30	Bergström 20'; Sankkinen 20'; Murto 120+6' (pen.)	Report	Jmaali 10'; Paatelainen 65', 105+5'; Biga 79'	Stadium: Klaukkala; Attendance: 150; Referee: Juuso Vuorinen

6 August 2017	HIFK/3 (4)	4–2	LPS (4)	Helsinki
15:30	Arffman 5'; Soppi 60', 79', 85'	Report	Huhanantti 10'; Rihtniemi 23'	Stadium: Töölö PK 6 TN; Attendance: 36; Referee: Tuomas Määttä

6 August 2017	HIFK/4 (6)	0–5	FC Honka/Akatemia (4)	Helsinki
20:00		Report	Ekholm 23', 45+1', 69'; Immonen 27'; Galibert 42'	Stadium: Väinämöinen TN; Attendance: 12; Referee: Jonathan Mainz

7 August 2017	KY-Sport (6)	2–3 (a.e.t.)	ÅIFK (4)	Turku
20:15	Monnonen 26', 51'	Report	Najjar 25'; Hiệp 79'; Habte 105+2'	Stadium: Yläkenttä KHT; Attendance: 75; Referee: Ville Käldström

== Second round ==
21 July 2017	Halkian Alku (3)	2–6	FC Finnkurd (4)	Pornainen
19:00	Pirjola 14'; Ahonen 18'	Report	Ojala 7' (o.g.); Konta 15', 24'; Jaba 29'; Mohammed Ahmed 69'; Tajini 87'	Stadium: Pornaisten TN; Attendance: 50; Referee: Juuso Vuorinen

1 August 2017	ABC/Strömsö (7)	1–3	JBK (3)	Vaasa
19:00	Villanen 64' (pen.)	Report	Ramsay 54'; Kähkönen 59'; Myrevik 82'	Stadium: Vaskiluoto; Attendance: 220; Referee: Marcus Beijar

8 August 2017	Virkiä (4)	1–4	VIFK (3)	Lapua
18:30	Laapio 58'	Report	Holmström 13', 14'; Sillah 36'; Maki 47'	Stadium: Lapuan keskuskenttä Attendance: 100; Referee: Sami Kuula

9 August 2017	AC Oulu U19 (6)	1–7	TP-47 (3)	Oulu
18:30	Sippala 77'	Report	Närhilä 7'; Juvonen 30', 54', 54', 75' (pen.); Koroma 35'; Sarkkinen 88' (pen.)	Stadium: Castrén; Attendance: 159; Referee: Atte Räinä

9 August 2017	AFC Keltik (6)	0–4	MP (3)	Joensuu
18:30		Report	Autran 16', 60', 64' (pen.); Liukkonen 74' (pen.)	Stadium: Koillispuisto; Attendance: 35

13 August 2017	KuuLa (6)	0–2	MuSa (3)	Turku
14:00		Report	Lehto 3'; Välilä 19' (pen.)	Stadium: Kisapuisto; Attendance: 61; Referee: Ville Käldström

13 August 2017	LIK (7)	2–2 (a.e.t.) (7–4 p)	Yllätys (6)	Liljendal
15:00	Törnblom 45', 120+9'	Report	Vänskä 78'; Ratilainenn 120+16'	Stadium: Sävträsk UK N Attendance: 47; Referee: Vesa Vainio

13 August 2017	PaRi/A (6)	1–8	TPV (3)	Jyväskylä
19:30	Hautanen 82'	Report	Koroma 4'; Riihimäki 15', 49', 55'; Salonen 36'; Näykki 50'; Mattila 63'; Hiilloskorpi 76'	Stadium: Palokka tekonurmi Attendance: 47; Referee: Santtu Keto

20 August 2017	Kuopion Elo (5)	4–0	PetPet (6)	Kuopio
19:45	Mustonen 18'; Räsänen 45'; Kröger 73'; Vuori 81'	Report		Stadium: Litmasen TN; Attendance: 35; Referee: Sami Hahl

21 August 2017	Pato (5)	2–1	ÅIFK (4)	Tervakoski
19:00	Vanhatalo 43'; Siivonen 90+2'	Report	Tamminen 86'	Stadium: Tervakoski N Attendance: 109; Referee: Teemu Pylkkänen

21 August 2017	Gnistan/Ogeli (5)	1–2	LePa (6)	Helsinki
18:15	Touray 77'	Report	Ngo 40'; Salminen 73'	Stadium: Pukinmäki N Attendance: 50; Referee: Jari Virtala

21 August 2017	Toukolan Teräs (6)	1–2	FC Viikingit (3)	Helsinki
18:30	Haglund 44'	Report	Parpala 29'; Paatelainen 60'	Stadium: Pirkkola N Referee: Santeri Nieminen

21 August 2017	SexyPöxyt (4)	0–6	Töölön Taisto (4)	Espoo
20:15		Report	Pesonen 4'; Klinga 22'; Keränen 24'; Own Goal 49'; Saari 86'; Lassila 88'	Stadium: Laaksolahti TN; Referee: Peiman Simani

22 August 2017	SC Riverball (3)	0–1	PEPO (3)	Joensuu
18:00		Report	Ikonen 3'	Stadium: Keskuskenttä; Attendance: 45; Referee: Hannu Kettunen

25 August 2017	FC Honka/Akatemia (4)	5–1	FC Mylly (7)	Espoo
13:00	Galibert 53', 75', 76'	Report	Ibrahim 54'	Stadium: Tapiola 1 TN; Attendance: 35; Referee: Fazli Suka

26 August 2017	HIFK/3 (5)	1–0	PETO/MJK (5)	Helsinki
15:30	Soininen 33'	Report		Stadium: Töölö PK 6 TN; Attendance: 21; Referee: Mohamed Abdelgayed

26 August 2017	JIK (7)	1–2	Peimari United (3)	Jomala
15:30	Fagerholm 46'	Report	Parkkinen 29'	Stadium: Vikingavallen gräs Attendance: 35; Referee: Josef Fagerholm

26 August 2017	SJK-j Apollo (7)	1–2	KajHa (4)	Seinäjoki
15:30		Report	Väisänen 24'; Borges De Souza 78'; Kemppainen 83'	Stadium: OmaSp Stadion; Attendance: 99; Referee: Mika-Markku Karjala

26 August 2017	Lieto (6)	0–4	PKKU (3)	Lieto
18:45		Report	Karjalainen 10'; Puljujärvi 72'; Kainulainen 74'; Leivo 83'	Stadium: Lieto KHT; Attendance: 79; Referee: Ville Käldström

27 August 2017	KaaPo (3)	0–1 (a.e.t.)	P-Iirot (3)	Kaarina
19:00		Report	Patola 96'	Stadium: Kaarina KHT; Attendance: 122; Referee: Jouni Hyytiä

== Third round ==
6 September 2017	PEPO (3)	4–3	MP (2)	Lappeenranta
19:00	Demirel 14'; Ikonen 15'; Koistinen 49', 79'	Report	Oinonen 35'; Autran 42', 89'	Stadium: Kimpisen Stadion; Attendance: 149; Referee: Niko Hänninen

9 September 2017	Kuopion Elo (5)	1–3	KajHa (4)	Kuopio
18:00	Tiilikainen 35'	Report	Mabrouk 67'; Borges De Souza 78', 90'	Stadium: Litmasen tekonurmi Attendance: 35; Referee: Pekka Koponen

10 September 2017	Pato (4)	3–0	JBK (3)	Janakkala
15:00		Report		Stadium: Tervakosken urheilukenttä Referee: Teemu Pylkkänen

11 September 2017	TP-47 (3)	3–2 (a.e.t.)	VIFK (3)	Tornio
17:30	Pyyny 19'; Isomäki 82'; Närhilä 120'	Report	Björk 61'; Streng 84'	Stadium: Pohjan Stadion; Attendance: 82; Referee: Janne Jussila

12 September 2017	LePa (6)	2–1	Töölön Taisto (4)	Espoo
18:00	Mäki-Tanila 61'; Sine 68'	Report	Alfat 59'	Stadium: Säterinniitty TN; Attendance: 50; Referee: Mikko Lipsanen

12 September 2017	LIK (7)	0–9	FC Honka/Akatemia (4)	Loviisa
18:00		Report	Linna 3', 18', 43', 50'; Heinonen 53'; Pikkarainen 57'; Kauppila 67'; Kinnunen 85'; Suhonen 86'	Stadium: Liljendalin urheilukenttä Attendance: 101; Referee: Mikko Matila

13 September 2017	P-Iirot (3)	0–1	PKKU (3)	Rauma
19:00		Report	Jung 69'	Stadium: Äijänsuon stadion Attendance: 251; Referee: Aleksi Makkonen

17 September 2017	HIFK Fotboll/3 (5)	0–3	TPV (3)	Helsinki
14:15		Report	Oksanen 3'; Koroma 66'; Näykki 82'	Stadium: Väinämöisen kenttä Attendance: 58; Referee: Janne Suvensalmi

17 September 2017	FC Finnkurd (4)	0–4	MuSa (3)	Helsinki
15:00		Report	Salminen 2'; Lehto 5'; Rantala 10'; Leppänen 26'	Stadium: Kontulan Tekonurmi; Attendance: 15; Referee: Hannu Hästbacka

19 September 2017	Peimari United (3)	0–2	FC Viikingit (3)	Paimion
18:30		Report	Mutika 28'; Biga 29'	Stadium: Paimion Urheilupuisto; Attendance: 50; Referee: Jesse Salo

== Fourth Round ==
26 September 2017	Pato (4)	0–8	TPV (3)	Janakkala
17:00		Report	Nibbling 15', 33', 54'; Riihimäki 29'; Dieter 42'; Oksanen 65'; Koroma 74'; Salomaa 81'	Stadium: Tervakosken urheilukenttä Attendance: 104; Referee: Teemu Pylkkänen

3 October 2017	LePa (6)	0–2	PEPO (3)	Espoo
18:00		Report	Ikonen 7'; Palomino 90+1'	Stadium: Leppävaara 1 TN; Referee: Abdirahman Sugulle

7 October 2017	MuSa (3)	5–1 (a.e.t.)	TP-47 (3)	Pori
15:00	Sallila 65'; Mäkelä 96'; Kolu 103', 106', 117'	Report	Pyyny 6'	Stadium: Musan Kenttä; Attendance: 101; Referee: Pouria Notash

7 October 2017	FC Honka/Akatemia (4)	5–1	KajHa (4)	Espoo
15:00	Echavarria Velez 21'; Ropa 47'; Own Goal 52'; Kiiski 72'; Sedjiu 79'	Report	Borges De Souza 14'	Stadium: Tapiola Sports Park; Attendance: 43; Referee: Peiman Simani

== Group stage ==
The teams participating in the Group Stage will be the 2017 Veikkausliiga teams (12), 2017 Ykkönen teams (10) and eight teams from the early rounds of the competition. The Group Stage will be played between January and March 2018 with the teams divided into five regional groups, with six teams per group. The top two teams from the group stage will advance directly to the semi-finals, while the remaining winners of each group and each second-place finisher will proceed to the quarterfinals.

=== Group A ===
Team	Pld	W	D	L	GF	GA	GD	Pts
KuPS	5	5	0	0	22	6	+16	15
AC Oulu	5	3	1	1	13	12	+1	10
RoPS	5	2	1	2	12	7	+5	7
AC Kajaani	5	2	0	3	10	14	−4	6
PS Kemi	5	1	1	3	6	10	−4	4
MuSa	5	0	1	4	5	19	−14	1

=== Group B ===
Team	Pld	W	D	L	GF	GA	GD	Pts
SJK	5	4	1	0	12	2	+10	13
VPS	5	3	1	1	16	4	+12	10
KPV	5	2	2	1	13	8	+5	8
FF Jaro	5	2	1	2	13	9	+4	7
TPV	5	1	1	3	4	16	−12	4
PK Keski-Uusimaa	5	0	0	5	1	20	−19	0

=== Group C ===
Team	Pld	W	D	L	GF	GA	GD	Pts
FC Ilves	5	3	2	0	11	3	+8	11
FC Lahti	5	3	2	0	12	8	+4	11
FC Haka	5	3	1	1	11	6	+5	10
JJK Jyväskylä	5	2	0	3	6	9	−3	6
GrIFK	5	1	0	4	6	13	−7	3
FC Viikingit	5	0	1	4	4	13	−9	1

=== Group D ===
Team	Pld	W	D	L	GF	GA	GD	Pts
FC Honka	5	5	0	0	15	3	+12	15
HJK Helsinki	5	4	0	1	19	4	+15	12
HIFK Fotboll	5	2	1	2	10	7	+3	7
KTP	5	2	0	3	10	10	0	6
IF Gnistan	5	1	1	3	2	17	−15	4
PEPO	5	0	0	5	3	18	−15	0

=== Group E ===
Team	Pld	W	D	L	GF	GA	GD	Pts
Inter Turku	5	4	1	0	18	2	+16	13
Ekenäs IF	5	3	1	1	7	5	+2	10
IFK Mariehamn	5	2	1	2	11	8	+3	7
TPS Turku	5	1	4	0	3	2	+1	7
Klubi 04	5	1	1	3	9	12	−3	4
FC Honka/2	5	0	0	5	0	19	−19	0

== Knock-out stage ==
=== Play-offs for Quarter-finals ===
17 March 2018	EIF	1–0	AC Oulu	Ekenäs
15:00	Tabe 76'	Report		Stadium: Tammisaari Keskuskenttä TN; Attendance: 347; Referee: Joni Hyytiä

17 March 2018	HJK	4–1	VPS	Helsinki
14:00	O'Shaughnessy 65'; Yaghoubi 69'; DeMello 86'; Mensah 90'	Report	Cae 88'	Stadium: Telia 5G Areena; Attendance: 467; Referee: Atte Jussila

17 March 2018	FC Haka	3–1 (a.e.t.)	FC Lahti	Valkeakoski
15:00	Thusberg 51'; Popovitch 95'; Nganbe 120'	Report	Anier 80'	Stadium: Vkoski Sahara TN; Attendance: 360; Referee: Daniel Enkvist

=== Quarter-finals ===
28 March 2018	FC Inter	2–0	FC Ilves	Turku
17:00	Källman 62', 82'	Report		Stadium: Kupittaa 5 KHT; Attendance: 400; Referee: Oskari Hämäläinen

29 March 2018	HJK Helsinki	2–0	KuPS	Helsinki
18:30	Riski 11'; DeMello 37'	Report		Stadium: Telia 5g Areena; Attendance: 819; Referee: Marko Grönholm

29 March 2018	SJK	1–2	FC Honka	Seinäjoki
18:30	Hetemaj 66'	Report	Levänen 14'; Rahimi 33'	Stadium: OmaSp Stadion; Attendance: 899; Referee: Kalle Mäkinen

28 March 2018	EIF	2–1	FC Haka	Ekenäs
18:30	Ekström 17'; Tabe 59'	Report	Ben 85'	Stadium: Tammisaari Keskuskenttä TN; Attendance: 708; Referee: Mohammad Al-Emara

=== Semi-finals ===
1 April 2018	HJK Helsinki	2–1	FC Honka	Helsinki
12:30	Riski 36'; Alho 75'	Report	Rahimi 90+4'	Stadium: Telia 5G Areena; Attendance: 679; Referee: Mattias Gestranius

2 April 2018	EIF	0–5	FC Inter	Ekenäs
18:30		Report	Furuholm 27'; Källman 37', 44'; Garcia 37'; Ademi 68'	Stadium: Tammisaari Keskuskenttä TN; Attendance: 742; Referee: Antti Munukka

=== Final ===
12 May 2018
15:00

HJK Helsinki	0–1	FC Inter
	Report	Kuningas 82'

Telia 5G Areena, Helsinki
Attendance: 3,540
Referee: Mikko Leino
