= Filip Valenčič =

Slovenian footballer (born 1992)

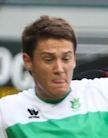

Personal information
- Date of birth: 7 January 1992 (age 34)
- Place of birth: Ljubljana, Slovenia
- Height: 1.83 m (6 ft 0 in)
- Position: Attacking midfielder

Team information
- Current team: Jaro
- Number: 9

Youth career
- Jezero Medvode
- –2010: Interblock

Senior career*
Years	Team	Apps	(Gls)
2010–2011	Interblock	31	(4)
2011–2015	Olimpija Ljubljana	88	(13)
2015	Monza	6	(1)
2015–2016	Notts County	9	(1)
2016–2017	PS Kemi	29	(9)
2017–2018	HJK	34	(12)
2018–2020	Stabæk	12	(0)
2018	Stabæk 2	8	(4)
2019	→ Inter Turku (loan)	27	(16)
2020	Inter Turku	7	(2)
2021	HJK	27	(6)
2022	Dinamo Minsk	7	(0)
2022	KuPS	9	(0)
2022	KuPS Akatemia	1	(0)
2023	ÍBV	9	(0)
2024	PK-35	0	(0)
2024	Olimpia Grudziądz	0	(0)
2024	Honka	5	(3)
2025–	Jaro	24	(2)

International career
2008	Slovenia U16	1	(0)
2008–2009	Slovenia U17	7	(0)
2010	Slovenia U19	5	(0)
2012–2013	Slovenia U20	4	(1)
2011–2013	Slovenia U21	2	(1)
- * Club domestic league appearances and goals as of 20 November 2025

Filip Valenčič (born 7 January 1992) is a Slovenian professional footballer who plays as a midfielder for Veikkausliiga club Jaro.

== Club career ==
Born in Ljubljana, Valenčič started his senior career with local side Interblock, before moving to Slovenian PrvaLiga side Olimpija Ljubljana in 2011.

In July 2015, he signed with English side Notts County. He scored his first goal for the club against Crawley Town in a 1–0 win in January 2016.

Following his short spell in England, he signed with Palloseura Kemi Kings ahead of their first season in the Veikkausliiga, the top flight of Finnish football. In 2017, he moved to HJK. In his first campaign with HJK, he finished as the league's joint second top-scorer with 15 goals (7 after his move from PS Kemi), and helped his team winning their record 28th league title. He also went on to win the league's player of the season award at the league's end of year gala on 3 November 2017.

After two successful seasons with HJK, Valenčič signed a deal with Stabæk in 2018 on a three-year contract. He would go on to only play 124 minutes during the 2018 Eliteserien campaign, scoring no goals. On 12 February 2019, he joined Inter Turku on loan for the 2019 Veikkausliiga season. He finished the campaign as the league's top scorer with 16 goals as the club finished in second place, securing a spot in the first qualifying round of the 2020–21 UEFA Europa League.

In June 2022, Valenčič signed for KuPS.

On 21 March 2024, over a month after making two league cup appearances for PK-35, he joined Polish third-tier club Olimpia Grudziądz on a deal until the end of the season.

On 28 February 2025, after a trial period, Valenčič officially joined newly promoted Veikkausliiga club Jaro.

== International career ==
Valenčič has represented Slovenia at various youth levels. In 2019, it was reported that he has considering switching allegiances and taking Finnish citizenship so that he could represent Finland on the international stage.

== Career statistics ==
As of match played 3 October 2025

Appearances and goals by club, season and competition
Club	Season	League			National cup (Note: Includes Slovenian Cup, Suomen Cup, Belarusian Cup, Icelandic Cup)		League cup (Note: Includes Finnish League Cup)		Continental		Total	
Club	Season	Division	Apps	Goals	Apps	Goals	Apps	Goals	Apps	Goals	Apps	Goals
Interblock	2009–10	Slovenian PrvaLiga	6	0	—		—		—		6	0
Interblock	2010–11	Slovenian Second League	25	4	6	3	—		—		31	7
Interblock	Total		31	4	6	3	0	0	0	0	37	7
Olimpija Ljubljana	2011–12	Slovenian PrvaLiga	25	3	1	0	—		5 (Note: Appearances in UEFA Europa League)	0	31	3
Olimpija Ljubljana	2012–13	Slovenian PrvaLiga	24	6	3	1	—		3	0	30	7
Olimpija Ljubljana	2013–14	Slovenian PrvaLiga	27	3	3	0	—		2	0	32	3
Olimpija Ljubljana	2014–15	Slovenian PrvaLiga	12	1	3	2	—		0	0	15	3
Olimpija Ljubljana	Total		88	13	10	3	0	0	10	0	108	16
Monza	2014–15	Serie C	6	1	—		—		—		6	1
Notts County	2015–16	League Two	9	1	0	0	0	0	—		9	1
PS Kemi	2016	Veikkausliiga	12	1	—		—		—		12	1
PS Kemi	2017	Veikkausliiga	17	8	5	4	—		—		22	12
PS Kemi	Total		29	9	5	4	0	0	0	0	34	13
HJK	2017	Veikkausliiga	16	7	—		—		2	0	18	7
HJK	2018	Veikkausliiga	18	5	6	2	—		1 (Note: Appearances in UEFA Champions League)	0	25	7
HJK	Total		34	12	6	2	0	0	3	0	43	14
Stabæk	2018	Eliteserien	6	0	—		—		—		6	0
Stabæk	2019	Eliteserien	0	0	0	0	—		—		0	0
Stabæk	2020	Eliteserien	6	0	0	0	—		—		6	0
Stabæk	Total		12	0	0	0	0	0	0	0	12	0
Stabæk 2	2018	2. divisjon	8	4	—		—		—		8	4
Inter Turku (loan)	2019	Veikkausliiga	27	16	5	5	—		2	1	34	22
Inter Turku	2020	Veikkausliiga	7	2	1	0	—		—		8	2
HJK	2021	Veikkausliiga	27	6	6	3	—		14 (Note: Four appearances and two goals in UEFA Champions League, four appearances in UEFA Europa League, six appearances and one goal in UEFA Europa Conference League)	3	47	12
Dinamo Minsk	2022	Belarusian Premier League	7	0	2	0	—		—		9	0
KuPS	2022	Veikkausliiga	9	0	0	0	0	0	4 (Note: Appearances in UEFA Europa Conference League)	1	13	1
KuPS Akatemia	2022	Kakkonen	1	0	—		—		—		1	0
ÍBV	2023	Besta deild karla	9	0	1	0	5	1	—		15	1
PK-35	2024	Ykkösliiga	0	0	0	0	2	0	—		2	0
Olimpia Grudziądz	2023–24	II liga	0	0	0	0	—		—		0	0
Honka	2024	Kakkonen	5	3	—		—		—		5	3
Jaro	2025	Veikkausliiga	24	2	4	4	1	0	—		29	6
Career total			333	73	46	24	7	1	33	5	419	103

== Honours ==
HJK

- Veikkausliiga: 2017, 2018, 2021
- Finnish Cup: 2016–17

Individual

- Veikkausliiga Player of the Month: June 2017, June 2021
- Veikkausliiga Player of the Year: 2017, 2019
- Veikkausliiga Team of the Year: 2017, 2019
- Veikkausliiga Forward of the Year: 2017, 2019
- Veikkausliiga Top Goalscorer: 2019
- Finnish Cup Top Goalscorer: 2017–18
