= Ibrahima Gueye =

Ibrahima Gueye is the name of:

- Ibrahima Gueye (athlete)
- Ibrahima Gueye (footballer, born 1978), Senegalese footballer
- Ibrahima Gueye (footballer, born 1996), Senegalese footballer
