= Anthony Annan =

Ghanaian footballer (born 1986)

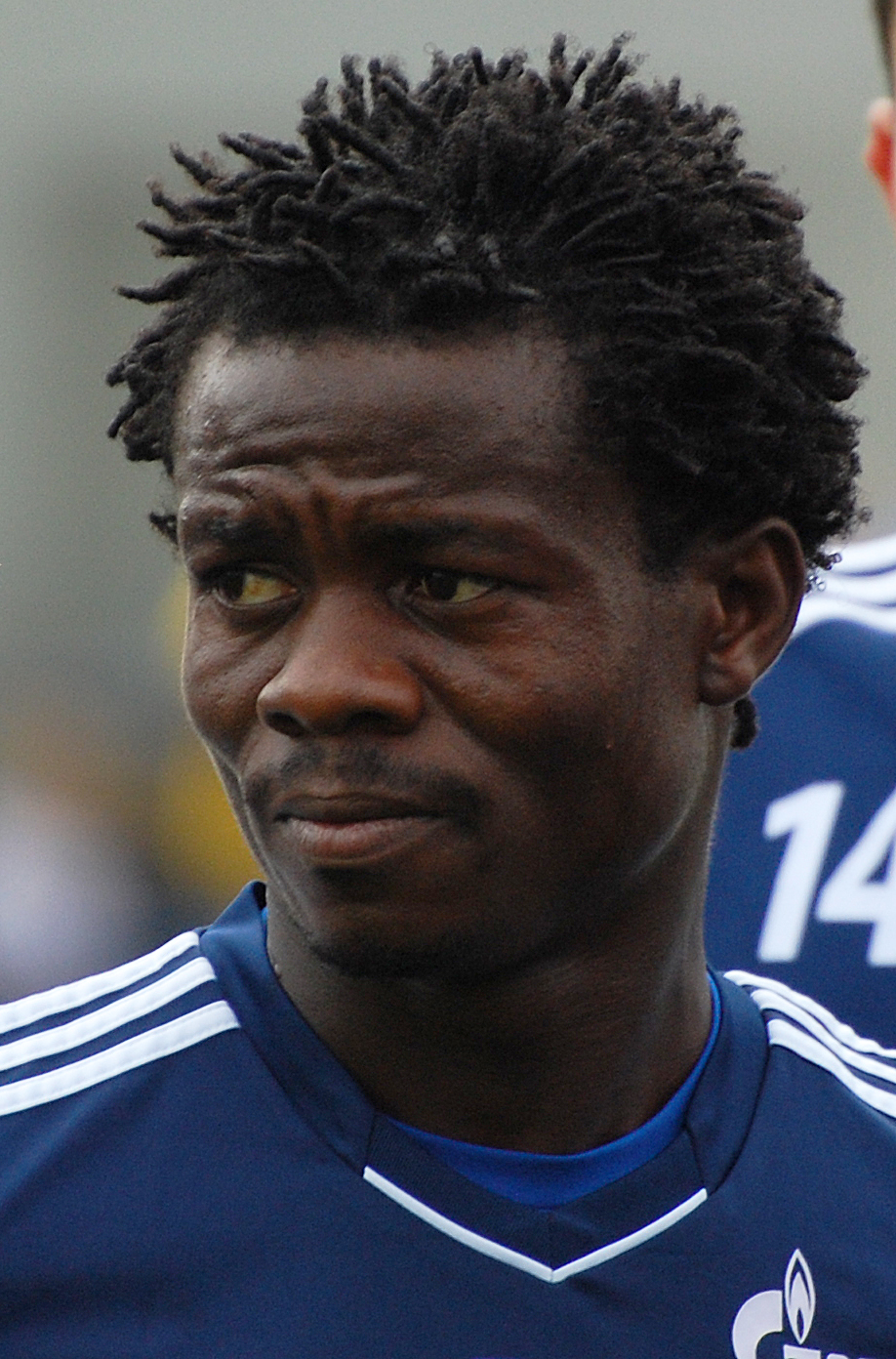
- Annan in 2011

Personal information
- Full name: Anthony Gildas Kofi Annan
- Date of birth: 21 July 1986 (age 40)
- Place of birth: Accra, Ghana
- Height: 1.75 m (5 ft 9 in)
- Position: Midfielder

Team information
- Current team: DJK Arminia Lirich

Youth career
- 1998–2000: Super Rainbow Stars
- 2000–2001: Venomous Vipers
- 2002: S.C. Adelaide
- 2003: Sekondi Wise Fighters

Senior career*
Years	Team	Apps	(Gls)
2003–2005	Sekondi Hasaacas		
2005–2007	Hearts of Oak		
2007–2008	Start	11	(0)
2008	→ Stabæk (loan)	12	(0)
2009–2010	Rosenborg	51	(0)
2011–2014	Schalke 04	12	(0)
2011–2012	→ Vitesse (loan)	24	(0)
2012–2013	→ Osasuna (loan)	6	(0)
2014	HJK	7	(0)
2015	1860 Munich	3	(0)
2015	Stabæk	7	(0)
2016–2018	HJK	72	(3)
2019	Beitar Jerusalem	4	(0)
2019–2021	Inter Turku	42	(1)
2022	TPS	23	(0)
2023-	DJK Arminia Lirich	0	(0)

International career^{‡}
2007–2013	Ghana	65	(2)
- * Club domestic league appearances and goals as of 23 October 2022 ‡ National team caps and goals as of 20 January 2013

Anthony Gildas Kofi Annan (born 21 July 1986) is a Ghanaian professional footballer who plays as a midfielder for DJK Arminia Lirich.

== Club career ==
=== Playing in Ghana ===
Born in Accra, Anthony Annan began playing football with a local Colts Super Rainbow Stars in Cape Coast, Ghana. He also played for Cape Coast Venomous Vipers in the Ghanaian Division one league before joined Sekondi Hasaacas in 2003 and later moving to Accra Hearts of Oak in 2005. At Accra Hearts of Oak, Annan was regarded as the best young midfielder in Ghana. He combined midfield artistry with some goal scoring skills, and endeared himself to many football fans in Ghana. Annan joined Accra Hearts of Oak from Sekondi Hasaacas FC in the 2005–06 league season.

=== Start ===
Annan signed for the Norwegian club Start on 26 January 2007, after a promising career in Ghana with his local club Accra Hearts of Oak. It came after he made his last training at Hearts of Oak.

Annan made his Start debut, in the opening game of the season, where he made his first start and played 74 minutes before being substituted, in a 4–2 loss against Aalesunds. He quickly established himself as a first team regular during I.K. Start's preseason games, and showed skills both on and off the ball. Unfortunately he was plagued by injury and illness during the first part of the 2007 season, and did not gain trust from then head coach Benny Lennartson in the important final games to avoid relegation.

After Start got relegated during the 2007 season, he joined Stabæk on loan until August 2008 despite signing a contract with them. Annan made his Stabæk debut, in the opening game of the season, where he started and played the whole game, in a 0–0 draw against Molde. After being away from the Stabæk, due to international commitment and injury, Annan made his return to the first team for a month, only to be sent-off, in a 2–1 loss against Vålerenga on 6 July 2008, for which he received a two match suspension. After making his return from suspension, Annan made a handful of appearances in his final month at the club before cutting his spell at the club to join Rosenborg.

He had been playing well in the heart of midfield as Stabæk went unbeaten in an impressive opening half of the season. Stabæk hinted that they want to buy him from Start, but Start stated that they would have to pay a "European transfer-fee". Instead, Annan claimed that several "big" clubs had approached his agent and that he would leave Norway during the summer. On 1 August 2008, it was revealed that Annan would be travelling to England for a trial with Blackburn Rovers. After impressing Paul Ince and the Blackburn coaching staff immensely, while on trial, he was sent back to his club to play in one more competitive game where the Blackburn Rovers scouts were to watch and report back on whether or not to complete the signing. However, the club decided against signing Annan. Nevertheless, he continued to be linked around Europe, such as, Arsenal, Manchester United, Racing Santander, A.C. Milan and Atlético Madrid.

=== Rosenborg ===
On 29 August 2008, it was announced that Annan was on the verge on joining Rosenborg from Start for worth about 10 million kroner, which was €1.2 million to get him.

Two days later, on 30 August 2008, he was presented for the audience on Lerkendal as a Rosenborg player before the match against Vålerenga and after the match, Rosenborg went on to win the game against Vålerenga by two goals to one. Annan made his league debut for Rosenborg on 14 September 2008 against Fredrikstad, with the game ending 1–1 draw. After missing out one match, due to a suspension, Annan returned to the first team from absent on 28 September 2008, in a 2–1 win over Aalesunds. Annan finished the rest of the season, making six appearances, as they finished second place in the league.

The following season saw Annan played under 4-2-3-1 tactics, alongside Alexander Tettey, under the management of Erik Hamrén. In the opening game of the season against Vålerenga, which saw Rosenborg win 3–0, Annan's performance was described as "exceptionally skilled at placing themselves and have defensive control." Following Tettey's departure, Annan assumed responsibility in the defensive midfielder and the formation had changed from 4-2-3-1 tactics to either 4-4-2 and 4-3-3 formations. As the season progressed, Annan helped the club win the league after beating Molde on 27 September 2009. Despite being suspended, his international commitment and injury, Annan made twenty-seven appearances in all competitions and at the end of the season, Annan was named the league's Team of the Year.

In the 2010 season, Annan began to play to either a 4-3-3 or an offensive 4-4-2 throughout the season under the management of both Hamrén and Nils Arne Eggen. In a 1–1 draw against Aalesund on 19 April 2010, Annan claimed that Aalesund's Tor Hogne Aarøy bit him during the match and even as going by far as calling him racist. However, Stig Thorbjørnsen played down Annan's claims and the Norwegian FA decided against taking action against Hogne Aarøy. After missing out several matches throughout June and early-June, due to international commitment at the World Cup, Annan made his return to the first team after a month absence on 18 July 2010, in a 1–1 draw against Odds. Then in a 1–1 draw against Vålerenga on 3 October 2010, Annan set up one of the goals, in a 3–1 win for Rosenborg. However, during the match, Annan was involved in an incident with André Muri. For this, Annan was suspended for a one match after picking up a yellow card and after returning to the club, Annan, once again, helped the club win the league for the second time in the row after beating Tromsø 1–0 on 24 October 2010. At the end of the season, Annan finished the season, making thirty appearances in all competitions.

At the end of the 2010 season, Annan was awarded the Kniksen of the year. Annan was also awarded VG's Player of the Year in Norwegian football. Following this, Annan was offered a new contract by the club, as his contract set to expire the following season, as the transfer speculation continues.

=== Schalke 04 ===
After four years in Norway, Annan left Rosenborg to join Schalke 04 on 28 January 2011, signing a three-year contract. The move was reported to be worth €3.5 million. Upon joining the club, Annan was expected to be a replacement for Ivan Rakitić, who left Schalke 04 for Sevilla soon after. Despite this, Annan stated that he opened to make a return to Rosenborg in the near future.

Annan made his debut for Schalke 04 on 4 February 2011, in the Revierderby against Borussia Dortmund, where he played 76 minutes before being substituted, in a 0–0 draw. Despite missing out, due to international commitment and a toe injury that kept him out for the rest of the season, Annan made nine appearances for the club.

Ahead of the 2011–12 season, Annan was linked with a move to Russian side Spartak Moscow. Instead, Annan opted to join Eredivisie side Vitesse Arnhem on a season-long loan deal. Annan made his Vitesse debut on 10 September 2011, where he played the whole game and made his first start, in a 4–0 loss against AZ Alkmaar. Since making his debut, Annan established himself in the starting eleven at the club until he called up by the national squad for the Africa Cup of Nations. After the campaign of the African Cup of Nation finished, Annan returned to the first team and made a handful of first team appearances before suffering an abdominal influenza that kept him out for the rest of the season. While the club was in doubt about signing Annan for the next season, he nevertheless returned to his parent club.

In the 2012–13 season, Annan moved to Spain when he joined La Liga side Osasuna on loan for the rest of the season. Annan made his Osasuna debut on 22 September 2012, where he came on as a substitute in the 75th minute, in a 3–1 loss against Real Zaragoza. Since then, Annan was given a handful of first team appearances before losing his first team place around November, due to fallen out of favour, international commitment and ankle injury that kept him out for the rest of the season. Despite this, Annan made eight appearances in all competitions for the Osasuna and returned to his parent club soon after.

For the rest of 2013, Annan continued to recover from ankle injury and despite appearing on the substitute bench in early 2014, he made his first appearance in three years for Schalke 04, in the second leg of the Champions League Knockout stage, where he came on as a late substitute, in a 3–1 loss against Real Madrid. Four days later, on 22 March 2014, Annan made his first league appearance in three years, playing 10 minutes after coming on as a substitute, in a 3–1 win against Eintracht Braunschweig. After making four appearances this season, Annan was released by the club.

=== HJK ===
Despite being linked with a move to Swedish Malmö, though they remained quiet throughout summer, Annan joined Finnish side HJK on 3 September 2014, until the end of the season. Upon joining the club, Annan hope the move would help rediscover his form he did before.

Annan made his HJK debut on 12 September 2014, where he came on as a substitute in the 58th minute for Teemu Tainio, in a 2–2 draw against KuPS. This was followed up by on 18 September 2014 when he made his first start for the club, in a UEFA Europa League against Copenhagen, which saw HJK lose 2–0. Annan went on to make twelve appearances for the club, seven of them being in the domestic league.

After helping the club win the league for the sixth times in a row, Annan also helped the club win the Finnish Cup against Inter Turku 5–3 in the penalty shoot-out, which Annan played 120 minutes. Following this, Annan was offered a new contract by the club.

=== 1860 München ===
During the winter break of the 2014–15 season, Annan opted to leave HJK when he signed a contract with German club 1860 Munich on 26 January 2015.

Annan made his 1860 München debut on 9 February 2015, where he played 32 minutes after coming on as a substitute in the second half, in a 2–1 loss against FC Heidenheim. However, Annan soon lost his first team place and was not in the squad for the rest of the season. With three appearances for the club, his contract was not extended after the season.

=== Stabæk ===
Following his release by 1860 München, Annan returned to Norway, where he joined Stabæk for the rest of the season.

Annan made his Stabæk debut for the second time on 19 September 2015, where he made his first start for them and played 63 minutes, in a 2–1 win over Tromsø. Four days later, on 23 September 2015, Annan caused controversy against his former club, Rosenborg in the semi-final of Norwegian Football Cup after being involved in an incident with player, Ole Selnæs. The referee, Tom Harald Hagen, who refereed the match, admitted that he would have sent-off Annan for his action. In the end, Annan escaped action from the NNF despite initially planning to give a two match suspension. After making seven appearances for the club, Annan was released by the club.

=== Return to HJK ===
On 5 February 2016, Annan returned to HJK, signing a contract to the end of the 2018 season. Annan later revealed he took a pay-cut to join the club.

However, at the start of the season, Annan suffered an undisclosed injury in training and was out of action for several months. Despite expecting to return, Annan's return was delayed for another month. After returning to training around early-June, Annan made his Veikkausliiga return on 10 July 2016 against PS Kemi, where he played for 20 minutes. However, in a match against HIFK on 10 August 2015, Annan received a red card after a second bookable offence, in a 0–0 draw. After serving a one match ban, Annan returned to the first team and then provided a winning goal, in a 1–0 win over KuPS on 28 August 2016. Annan finished his full season at HJK, making sixteen appearances in all competitions.

After failing to renew his contract, Annan left HJK at the end of 2018.

=== Beitar Jerusalem ===
On 5 February 2019 Annan signed the Israeli Premier League club Beitar Jerusalem until the end of the season, with an option for one more season.

=== Inter Turku ===
In August 2019, Annan moved to Veikkausliiga, Finnish top flight side Inter Turku after leaving Beitar Jerusalem as a free agent to make a return to the Finnish league after playing 111 league matches for HJK Helsinki in the past. He signed a one-year deal contract after passing his medical. Annan scored his debut goal for the club on 28 September 2020 after scoring in the 29th minute of the match to push them to a 3–0 victory against FC Lahti at the Veritas Stadion.

In January 2021, after playing for the club for more than a year his contract was extended for another year with an extended obligation also as a player-coach.

=== TPS ===
On 17 March 2022, Annan signed with TPS for the 2022 season with an option to extend for another year.

== International career ==
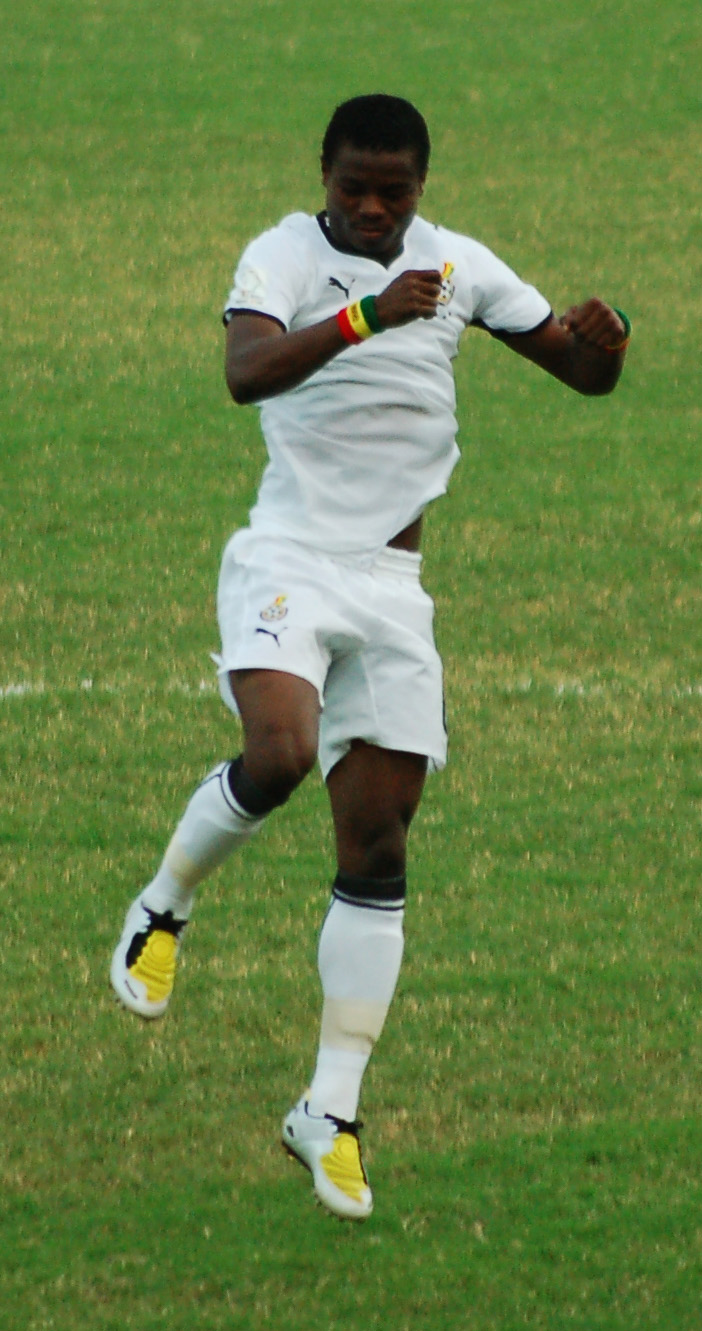
Annan playing for Ghana at the 2008 AFCON quarter-final match against Nigeria

A Junior and Olympic International for Ghana, Annan received his first senior call up for the national team on 20 March 2007 as a direct injury replacement for Essien for Ghana's FIFA International friendlies against Austria and Brazil in 2007.

His first cap came against Brazil on 27 March 2007 at the Råsunda Stadium, Stockholm, Sweden when Ghana lost 0–1. After helping the national side finish third place in the African Cup of Nations. He made his first goal for the national team in the 2–2 draw against Mali 15 November 2009.

The following year, Annan played for Ghana at the FIFA World Cup in South Africa and played his first World Cup match, where he played the whole game, in a 1–0 win over Serbia in the group stage. Annan played all five matches for the national side in the World Cup until their elimination against Uruguay after losing 4–2 in the penalty shootout.

Two years on, Annan was called up by the national team for the Africa Cup of Nations campaign and went on to make seven appearances for the side. Later in the year, Annan scored his second national goal for the side on 8 September 2012, in a 2–0 win over Malawi. Following this, Annan was then called up by the national team for the African Cup of Nations.

In 2020 Annan expressed his readiness to play for the Ghana Blackstars despite staying home for sometime.

== Personal life ==
=== Family ===
Annan claims to be related to Ghanaian diplomat and former Secretary-General of the United Nations, Kofi Annan, although this has been denied by a spokesperson working for Kofi Annan.

Annan's mother, Sophia Sampson, died in Cape Coast on 2 February 2012 after a short illness. This was while he was playing for Ghana in the 2012 Africa Cup of Nations.

In April 2007, Annan married his girlfriend Gifty Annan in Ghana, causing him to miss a game against Stabæk, though he also missed out, due to a virus around the same time. Together, the couple has two children.

While settling in Norway, Annan began to take driving lessons and began to adapt in the country by learning English.

== Career statistics ==
=== Club ===
As of match played on 23 October 2022

Appearances and goals by club, season and competition
Club	Season	League			National cup (Note: Includes Norwegian Football Cup, DFB-Pokal, KNVB Cup, Copa del Rey, Finnish Cup)		Europe		Other		Total	
Club	Season	Division	Apps	Goals	Apps	Goals	Apps	Goals	Apps	Goals	Apps	Goals
Start	2007	Tippeligaen	11	0	0	0	—		—		11	0
Stabæk	2008	Tippeligaen	12	0	0	0	2 (Note: Appearances in UEFA Europa League)	0	—		14	0
Rosenborg	2009	Tippeligaen	25	0	0	0	4	0	—		29	0
Rosenborg	2010	Tippeligaen	26	0	1	1	11 (Note: Five appearances in UEFA Champions League, six appearances in the UEFA Europa League)	0	1 (Note: Appearance in Mesterfinalen)	0	39	1
Rosenborg	Total		51	0	1	1	15	0	1	0	68	1
Schalke 04	2010–11	Bundesliga	9	0	1	0	0	0	—		10	0
Schalke 04	2013–14	Bundesliga	3	0	0	0	1 (Note: Appearance in UEFA Champions League)	0	—		4	0
Schalke 04	Total		12	0	1	0	1	0	0	0	14	0
Vitesse (loan)	2011–12	Eredivisie	24	0	3	0	—		—		27	0
Osasuna (loan)	2012–13	La Liga	6	0	2	0	—		—		8	0
HJK	2014	Veikkausliiga	7	0	1	0	5	0	—		13	0
1860 Munich	2014–15	2. Bundesliga	3	0	0	0	—		—		3	0
Stabæk	2015	Tippeligaen	7	0	1	0	—		—		8	0
HJK	2016	Veikkausliiga	15	0	1	0	4	0	—		20	0
HJK	2017	Veikkausliiga	30	3	3	0	4	0	—		37	3
HJK	2018	Veikkausliiga	27	0	8	0	6 (Note: Four appearances in UEFA Champions League, two appearances in UEFA Europa League)	0	—		41	0
HJK	Total		72	3	12	0	14	0	0	0	98	3
Beitar Jerusalem	2018–19	Israeli Premier League	4	0	—		—		—		4	0
Inter Turku	2019	Veikkausliiga	6	0	0	0	0	0	—		6	0
Inter Turku	2020	Veikkausliiga	16	1	9	0	1	0	—		26	1
Inter Turku	2021	Veikkausliiga	20	0	5	0	2 (Note: Appearances in UEFA Europa Conference League)	0	—		27	0
Inter Turku	Total		42	1	14	0	3	0	0	0	59	1
TPS	2022	Ykkönen	24	0	1	0	—		2 (Note: Appearances in Ykkönen play-offs)	0	27	0
Career total			275	4	35	1	41	0	3	0	354	5

=== International ===
Appearances and goals by national team and year
National team	Year	Apps	Goals
Ghana	2007	6	0
Ghana	2008	12	0
Ghana	2009	9	1
Ghana	2010	14	0
Ghana	2011	8	0
Ghana	2012	14	1
Ghana	2013	2	0
Total		65	2

Scores and results list Ghana's goal tally first, score column indicates score after each Annan goal.

List of international goals scored by Anthony Annan
No.	Date	Venue	Opponent	Score	Result	Competition
1	15 November 2009	Baba Yara Stadium, Kumasi, Ghana	Mali	2–2	2–2	2010 FIFA World Cup qualification
2	8 September 2012	Ohene Djan Stadium, Accra, Ghana	Malawi	2–0	2–0	2013 Africa Cup of Nations qualification

== Honours ==
Hearts of Oak

- Ghana Premier League: 2006–07

Stabæk

- Eliteserien: 2008

Rosenborg

- Eliteserien: 2009, 2010
- Superfinalen: 2010

Schalke 04

- DFB-Pokal: 2010–11
- DFL-Supercup: 2011

HJK Helsinki

- Veikkausliiga: 2014, 2017, 2018
- Finnish Cup: 2014, 2016–17

Ghana

- Africa Cup of Nations: runner-up 2010; third place: 2008

Individual

- Kniksen of the Year: 2010
- VG's Player of the Year: 2010
- Kniksen Award Midfielder of the Year: 2010
- Veikkausliiga Midfielder of the Year: 2017
- Veikkausliiga Team of the Year: 2017
- Eliteserien Team of the Season: 2009
- Rosenborg Player of the Season: 2009
- HJK Helsinki Club President Award: 2017
