= Maksim Rudakov =

Russian footballer (born 1996)

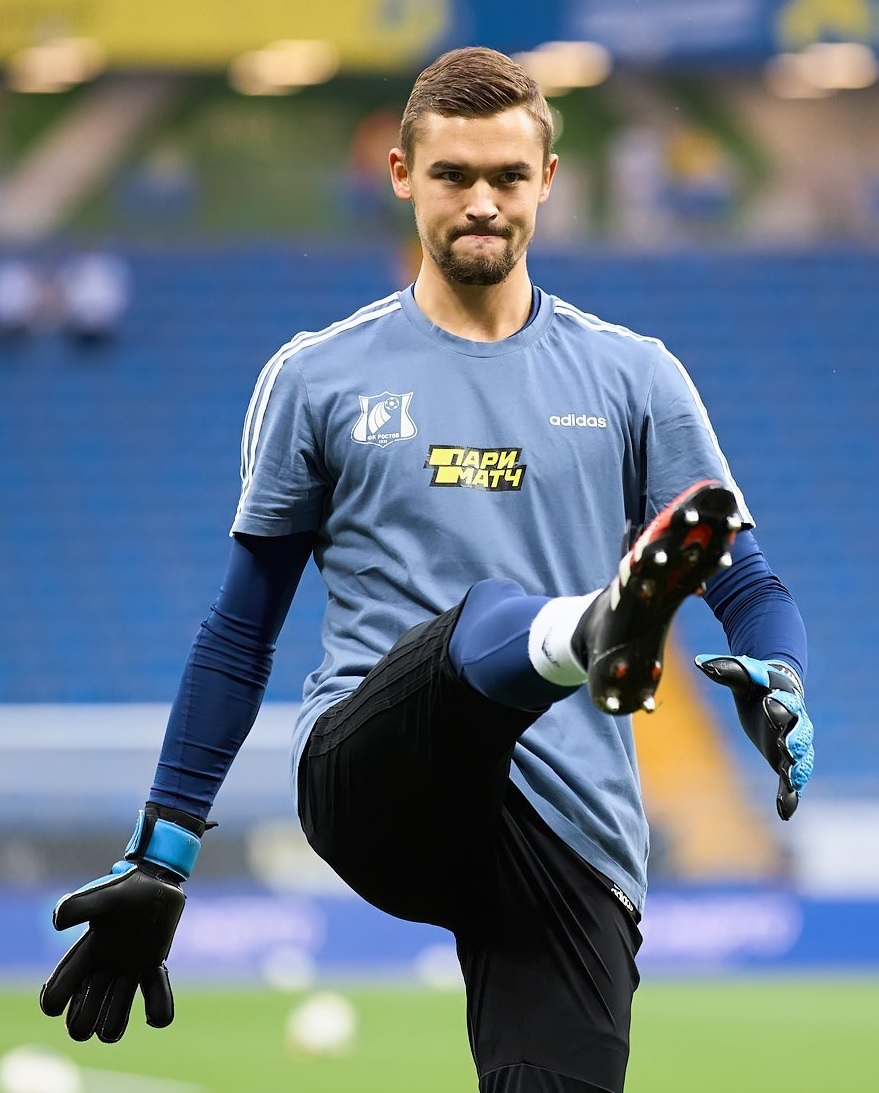
- Rudakov with FC Rostov in 2020

Personal information
- Full name: Maksim Alekseyevich Rudakov
- Date of birth: 22 January 1996 (age 30)
- Place of birth: Saint Petersburg, Russia
- Height: 1.90 m (6 ft 3 in)
- Position: Goalkeeper

Team information
- Current team: Orenburg
- Number: 88

Senior career*
Years	Team	Apps	(Gls)
2012–2020	Zenit Saint Petersburg	0	(0)
2016	→ FC Zenit Penza (loan)	9	(0)
2017	→ Zenit-2 Saint Petersburg	4	(0)
2018–2019	→ HJK (loan)	53	(0)
2020–2024	Rostov	1	(0)
2021	→ Rotor Volgograd (loan)	0	(0)
2022–2023	→ Honka (loan)	55	(0)
2024–2026	Sochi	7	(0)
2026–	Orenburg	2	(0)

International career^{‡}
2012	Russia U16	2	(0)
2012	Russia U17	1	(0)
2014	Russia U18	5	(0)
2014–2015	Russia U19	2	(0)
2016	Russia U21	1	(0)
- * Club domestic league appearances and goals as of 2 August 2026 ‡ National team caps and goals as of 10 November 2016

Maksim Alekseyevich Rudakov (Russian: Максим Алексеевич Рудаков; born 22 January 1996) is a Russian footballer who plays as a goalkeeper for Orenburg.

== Career ==
=== Club ===
Rudakov made his debut in the Russian Professional Football League for FC Zenit Penza on 3 September 2016 in a game against FC Kaluga.

On 21 December 2017 Rudakov joined the Finnish club HJK on loan for one year with an extension option. On 9 November 2018, HJK confirmed that Rudakov's loan deal had been extended for an additional season.

On 12 February 2020, he signed a 4.5-year contract with Russian Premier League club FC Rostov. He made his Russian Premier League debut for Rostov on 16 May 2021 in a game against FC Krasnodar.

On 16 June 2021, he joined Rotor Volgograd on loan for the 2021–22 season. On 10 August 2021, the loan was terminated early. On 25 December 2021, Rostov announced that he will return to Finland and join Honka on loan for the 2022 season. The loan term was extended on 15 November 2022 to 31 July 2023.

On 9 February 2024, Rudakov signed with Sochi.

On 11 February 2026, Rudakov moved to Orenburg.

=== International ===
Rudakov was included in the Russia national under-19 football team for the 2015 UEFA European Under-19 Championship, in which Russia was the runner-up, but did not play in any games behind the first-choice goalkeeper Anton Mitryushkin.

== Career statistics ==
=== Club ===
As of 5 August 2026

Appearances and goals by club, season and competition
Club	Season	League			National Cup		League Cup		Continental		Other		Total	
Club	Season	Division	Apps	Goals	Apps	Goals	Apps	Goals	Apps	Goals	Apps	Goals	Apps	Goals
Zenit St. Petersburg	2013–14	Russian Premier League	0	0	0	0	–		0	0	0	0	0	0
Zenit St. Petersburg	2014–15	Russian Premier League	0	0	0	0	–		0	0	–		0	0
Zenit St. Petersburg	2015–16	Russian Premier League	0	0	0	0	–		0	0	0	0	0	0
Zenit St. Petersburg	2016–17	Russian Premier League	0	0	0	0	–		0	0	0	0	0	0
Zenit St. Petersburg	2017–18	Russian Premier League	0	0	0	0	–		0	0	0	0	0	0
Zenit St. Petersburg	2018–19	Russian Premier League	0	0	0	0	–		0	0	–		0	0
Zenit St. Petersburg	2019–20	Russian Premier League	0	0	0	0	–		0	0	0	0	0	0
Zenit St. Petersburg	Total		0	0	0	0	–		0	0	0	0	0	0
Zenit Penza (loan)	2016–17	Russian Second League	9	0	0	0	–		–		–		9	0
Zenit-2 St.Petersburg (loan)	2016–17	Russian First League	3	0	–		–		–		3 (Note: Appearances in the FNL Cup)	0	6	0
Zenit-2 St.Petersburg (loan)	2017–18	Russian First League	1	0	–		–		–		–		1	0
Zenit-2 St.Petersburg (loan)	Total		4	0	0	0	–		0	0	3	0	7	0
HJK (loan)	2018	Veikkausliiga	27	0	5	0	–		6 (Note: Four appearances in UEFA Champions League, two appearances in UEFA Europa League)	0	–		38	0
HJK (loan)	2019	Veikkausliiga	26	0	5	0	–		6	0	2 (Note: Appearances in the European competition play-offs)	0	39	0
HJK (loan)	Total		53	0	10	0	–		12	0	2	0	77	0
Rostov	2019–20	Russian Premier League	0	0	–		–		–		–		0	0
Rostov	2020–21	Russian Premier League	1	0	0	0	–		0	0	–		1	0
Rostov	2021–22	Russian Premier League	0	0	0	0	–		–		–		0	0
Rostov	Total		1	0	0	0	–		0	0	0	0	1	0
Rotor Volgograd (loan)	2021–22	Russian First League	0	0	–		–		–		–		0	0
Honka (loan)	2022	Veikkausliga	26	0	0	0	4	0	–		–		30	0
Honka (loan)	2023	Veikkausliga	29	0	2	0	3	0	2 (Note: Appearances in UEFA Conference League)	0	–		36	0
Honka (loan)	Total		55	0	2	0	7	0	2	0	–		66	0
Sochi	2023–24	Russian Premier League	4	0	1	0	–		–		–		5	0
Sochi	2024–25	Russian First League	2	0	0	0	–		–		–		2	0
Sochi	2025–26	Russian Premier League	1	0	0	0	–		–		–		1	0
Sochi	Total		7	0	1	0	0	0	0	0	0	0	8	0
Orenburg	2025–26	Russian Premier League	1	0	1	0	–		–		–		2	0
Orenburg	2026–27	Russian Premier League	1	0	1	0	–		–		–		2	0
Orenburg	Total		2	0	2	0	0	0	0	0	0	0	4	0
Career total			122	0	16	0	7	0	14	0	5	0	164	0

== Honours ==
HJK

- Veikkausliiga: 2018

Honka

- Finnish League Cup: 2022
