= Jim Myrevik =

Finnish footballer (born 1996)

Personal information
- Date of birth: 20 January 1996 (age 30)
- Place of birth: Pedersöre, Finland
- Height: 1.79 m (5 ft 10 in)
- Position: Midfielder

Team information
- Current team: Jaro
- Number: 21

Youth career
- Esse IK

Senior career*
Years	Team	Apps	(Gls)
2015–2021	JBK	55	(15)
2018–	Jaro	202	(17)
- * Club domestic league appearances and goals as of 13 November 2026

Jim Myrevik (born 20 January 1996) is a Finnish professional footballer who plays as a midfielder for Veikkausliiga club Jaro.

== Career ==
Myrevik played in the youth sector of Esse IK, and made his senior debut with Jakobstads BK in 2015. He debuted with FF Jaro in 2018 in the second tier Ykkönen.

At the end of the 2024 Ykkösliiga season, Jaro won the promotion to Veikkausliiga, and Myrevik signed a new deal with the club. On 5 April 2025, Myrevik made a debut in Veikkausliiga, in a 2–0 away win against IFK Mariehamn.

== Honours ==
Jaro

- Ykkösliiga runner-up: 2024
