= Etchu Tabe =

Cameroonian-born American soccer player

Personal information
- Full name: Etchu Tabe
- Date of birth: July 12, 1986 (age 40)
- Place of birth: Buea, Cameroon
- Height: 6 ft 4 in (1.93 m)
- Position: Defender

Team information
- Current team: Ekenäs IF

Youth career
- 2004–2005: Brewton-Parker Barons
- 2006–2007: Georgia Southwestern State Hurricanes

Senior career*
Years	Team	Apps	(Gls)
2008–2009	Ljungskile	31	(2)
2010–2011	RoPS	41	(1)
2012–2013	KuPS	40	(1)
2014–2016	Ekenäs IF	40	(5)
2016	FC Haka	17	(2)
2017–	Ekenäs IF	40	(3)
- * Club domestic league appearances and goals as of 31 January 2019

Etchu Tabe (born July 12, 1986) is a Cameroonian-born American soccer player who plays as a defender or striker for Ekenäs IF. At 14, Tabe attended Baldwin High School after moving to Georgia, U.S., from Buea, Cameroon, where his father was a professional soccer player.

== Career ==
=== College career ===
Tabe played defender during his two years at Brewton-Parker College in Mt. Vernon, Georgia. He transferred to Georgia Southwestern State University, where during his first year as a junior he led the team in goals scored. Tabe set a Georgia Southwestern record for goals and points with 10 and 26, respectively, on his way to being named to the All-Conference team for the Peach Belt Conference.

=== Professional career ===
On January 11, 2008, Tabe signed with Ljungskile SK.

In the 2008 season, Tabe made 19 appearances for LSK, and 24 (22 league) appearances in 2009. In February 2010, Tabe signed with the Finnish Ykkönen club RoPS. For the 2011 season, the team was promoted to Veikkausliiga, where Tabe made 23 appearances and scored one goal. The team was, however, relegated back to Ykkönen, and Tabe signed a contract with another Veikkausliiga team, KuPS, for the 2012 season.
