= Evans Mensah (footballer, born 1998) =

Ghanaian footballer

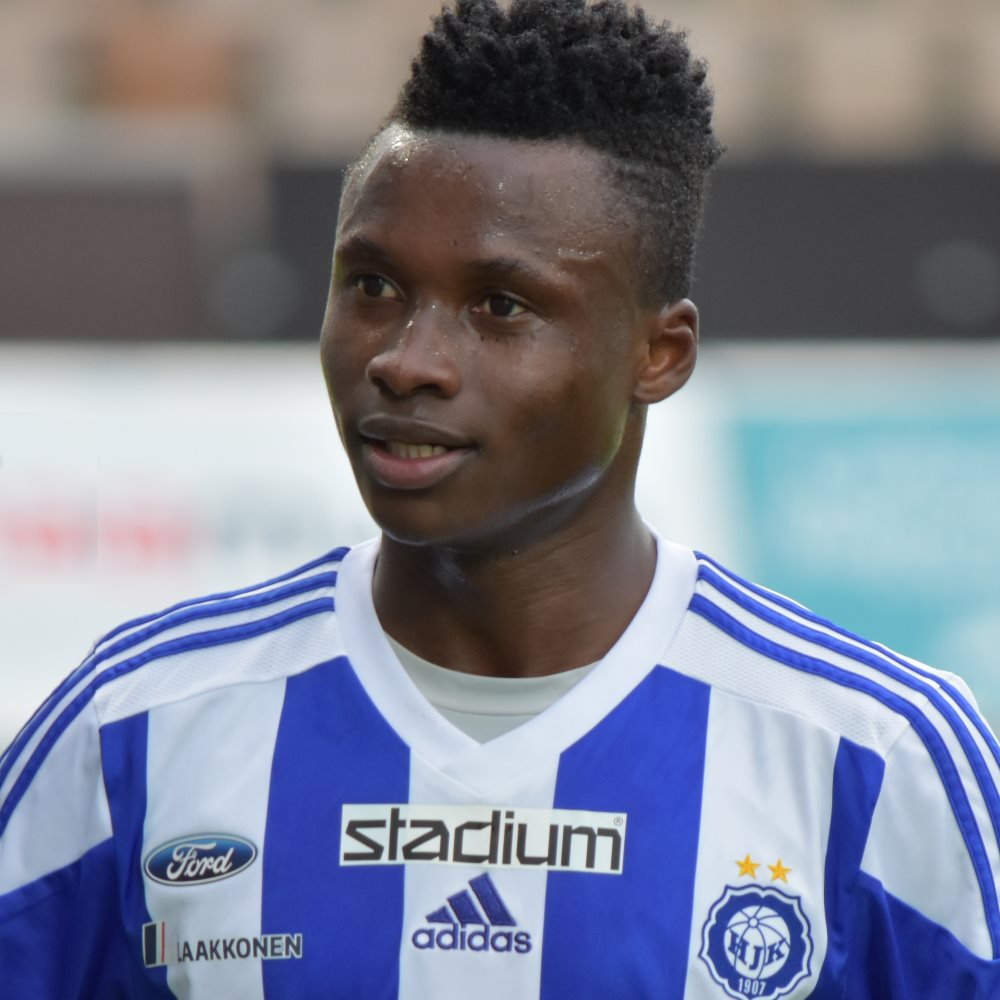
- Mensah with HJK in 2017

Personal information
- Date of birth: 9 February 1998 (age 28)
- Place of birth: Agona Swedru, Ghana
- Height: 1.65 m (5 ft 5 in)
- Position: Winger

Youth career
- –2014: Right to Dream Academy
- 2014–2016: Inter Allies

Senior career*
Years	Team	Apps	(Gls)
2016	Inter Allies	17	(1)
2016	→ Klubi-04 (loan)	2	(0)
2016	→ HJK (loan)	3	(0)
2016–2020	HJK	70	(19)
2020–2021	Al-Duhail	0	(0)
2020	→ Portimonense (loan)	0	(0)
2020–2021	→ Al-Kharaitiyat (loan)	18	(1)
2021–2022	Ceramica Cleopatra	15	(1)
2023	Torpedo-BelAZ Zhodino	13	(0)

International career
2019	Ghana U23		
- * Club domestic league appearances and goals as of 21:00, 2 December 2023 (UTC)

Evans Mensah (born 9 February 1998) is a Ghanaian footballer who plays as a winger.

== Early life and youth ==
Born in Agona Swedru and raised in Ghana, Evans Mensah joined Right to Dream Academy after being scouted at an academy event.

== Club career ==
Mensah was loaned to HJK in Finland after a successful medical analysis, making his Veikkausliiga debut for HJK in 3–2 loss to Inter Turku, coming on as substitute in the 90th minute, on 16 September 2016.

== International career ==
Mensah was called up to the Ghana national football team for the first time as a replacement for David Accam ahead of 2017 Africa Cup of Nations qualifier against Mozambique.

== Career statistics ==
=== Club ===
As of match played 29 May 2024

Appearances and goals by club, season and competition
Club	Season	League			Cup (Note: Includes Suomen Cup, Qatar Cup, Egypt Cup and Belarusian Cup)		Continental		Other		Total	
Club	Season	Division	Apps	Goals	Apps	Goals	Apps	Goals	Apps	Goals	Apps	Goals
Inter Allies	2016	Ghana Premier League	17	1	-		-		-		17	1
Klubi 04 (loan)	2016	Kakkonen	2	0	–		–		–		2	0
HJK (loan)	2016	Veikkausliiga	3	0	0	0	0	0	0	0	3	0
Klubi 04	2017	Kakkonen	1	1	1	0	–		–		2	1
HJK	2017	Veikkausliiga	29	8	7	2	4 (Note: Includes UEFA Europa League)	0	-		36	10
HJK	2018	Veikkausliiga	20	4	7	1	6 (Note: Includes UEFA Champions League and UEFA Europa League)	1	–		33	6
HJK	2019	Veikkausliiga	21	7	2	0	6	0	–		29	7
HJK	Total		70	19	16	3	16	1	-	-	102	23
Al-Duhail SC	2019–20	Qatar Stars League	0	0	0	0	0	0	0	0	0	0
Portimonense (loan)	2019–20	Primeira Liga	0	0	0	0	–		–		0	0
Al-Kharaitiyat (loan)	2020–21	Qatar Stars League	18	1	5	3	–		2 (Note: Includes Emir of Qatar Cup)	0	25	4
Ceramica Cleopatra	2021–22	Egyptian Premier League	15	1	1	0	–		–		16	1
Torpedo-BelAZ Zhodino	2023	Belarusian Premier League	13	0	1	1	2 (Note: Includes UEFA Europa Conference League)	0	–		16	1
Career total			139	22	24	8	18	1	2	0	183	31
