= Arto Laitinen =

Arto Laitinen (born 1969) is a professor of philosophy at Tampere University.

== Selected publications ==
- Ikaheimo, Heikki; Laitinen, Arto, eds. (2011-03-24). Recognition and Social Ontology. Brill. doi:10.1163/ej.9789004202900.i-398. ISBN 978-90-04-20750-9.
- Laitinen, Arto; Sandis, Constantine (2010-10-13). Hegel on Action. Palgrave Macmillan. ISBN 978-0-230-22908-2.
