= Markus Uusitalo =

Finnish footballer (born 1997)

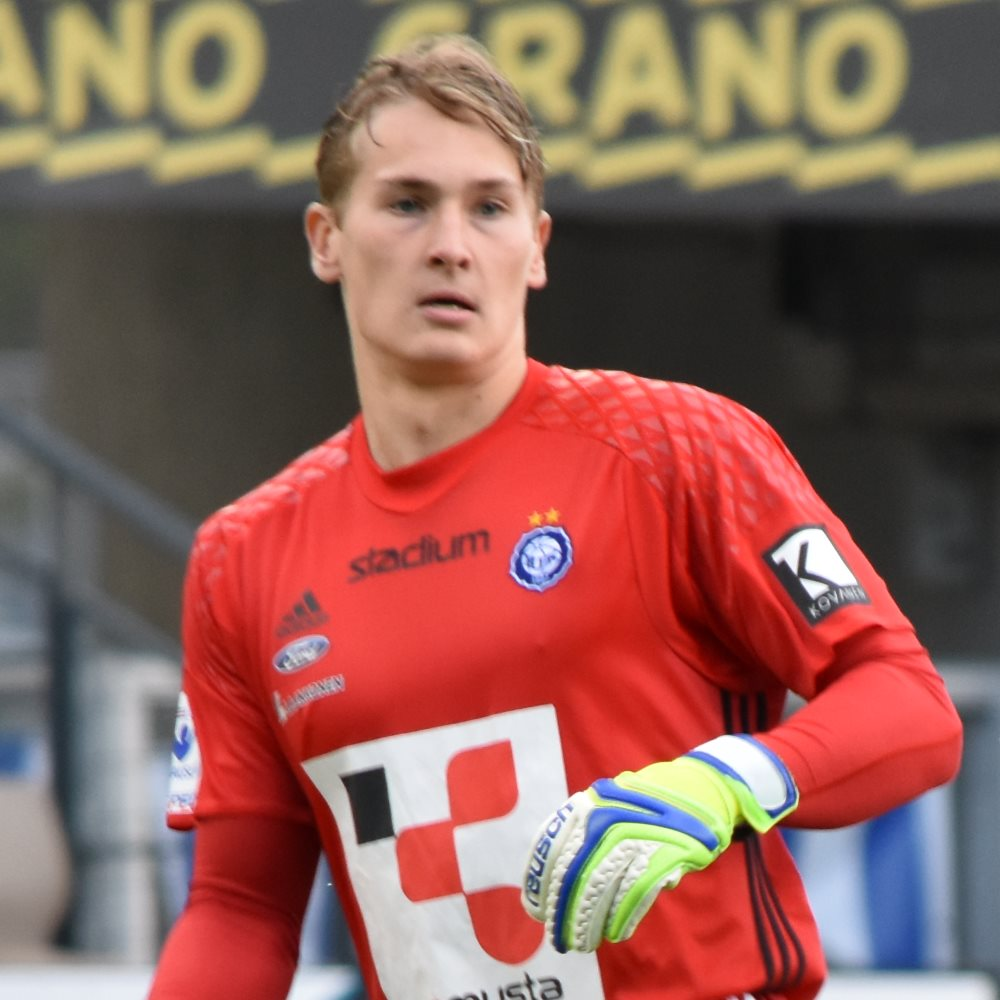

Personal information
- Date of birth: 15 May 1997 (age 29)
- Place of birth: Espoo, Finland
- Height: 1.89 m (6 ft 2 in)
- Position: Goalkeeper

Senior career*
Years	Team	Apps	(Gls)
2013–2014	Pallohonka	6	(0)
2014	FC Honka	0	(0)
2015	VPS	0	(0)
2015	→ FC Kiisto (loan)	8	(0)
2016–2019	HJK	25	(0)
2016	→ Klubi 04 (loan)	4	(0)
2017	→ Klubi 04 (loan)	2	(0)
2020–2021	Honka	6	(0)
2021	→ HIFK (loan)	13	(0)
2022–2023	SJK	18	(0)
- * Club domestic league appearances and goals

Markus Uusitalo (born 15 May 1997) is a Finnish former professional footballer who played as a goalkeeper.

== Career ==
On 13 November 2019 FC Honka confirmed that Uusitalo would join the club for the 2020 season, signing a deal until the end of the year. He moved on loan to HIFK for the 2021 season. After the 2021 season, he signed for SJK.

On 18 October 2023, Uusitalo announced that he would end his professional career at the end of the 2023 Veikkausliiga season.
