= Adrian Cașcaval =

Moldovan footballer

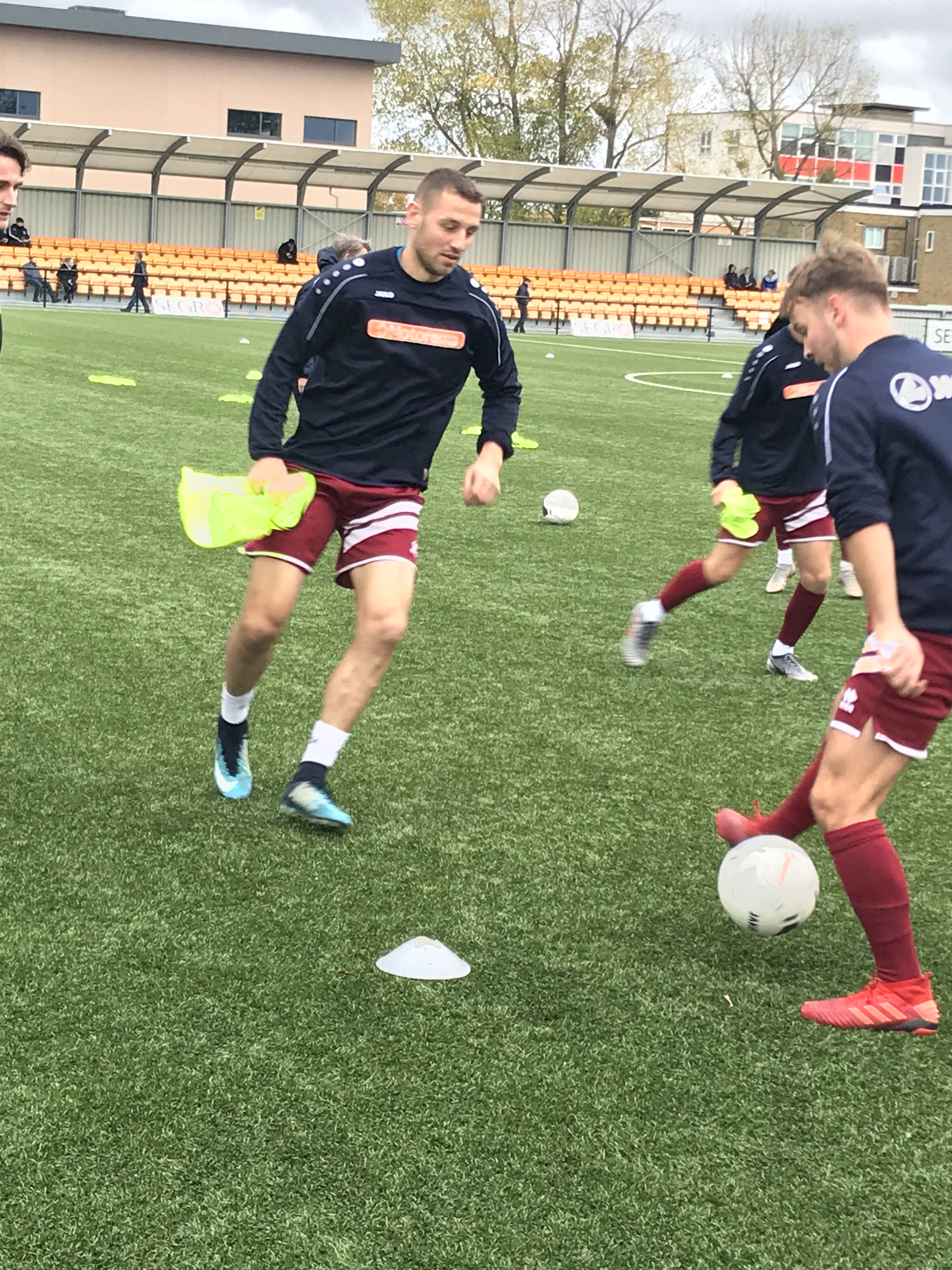
- Cașcaval warming up for Chelmsford City in 2019

Personal information
- Full name: Adrian Cașcaval
- Date of birth: 10 June 1987 (age 39)
- Place of birth: Chişinău, Moldovan SSR, Soviet Union
- Height: 1.94 m (6 ft 4 in)
- Position: Defender

Senior career*
Years	Team	Apps	(Gls)
2007–2012	Academia Chişinău	110	(13)
2012	Kaisar	6	(0)
2012–2013	Academia Chişinău	24	(1)
2013–2014	Veris	32	(5)
2014	Costuleni	3	(1)
2015	Olmaliq	15	(2)
2015	Neftchi Fergana	14	(2)
2016	Dinamo-Auto Tiraspol	10	(1)
2016–2017	Luch-Energiya Vladivostok	24	(1)
2017	Naxxar Lions	11	(1)
2018	Víkingur	23	(6)
2018–2020	Chelmsford City	47	(1)
2020	Romford	4	(0)
Total		323	(34)

International career^{‡}
2011–2017	Moldova	9	(0)
- * Club domestic league appearances and goals as of 31 October 2020 ‡ National team caps and goals as of 9 May 2019

Adrian Cașcaval (born 10 June 1987) is a former Moldovan football player.

== Club career ==
Cașcaval began his career with hometown club Academia Chişinău, where he stayed for five years, before moving to Kazakh club Kaisar. After just six league games with Kaisar, Cașcaval returned to Academia Chişinău. Cașcaval made 24 Moldovan National Division appearances on his return to the club, signing for Veris in the summer of 2013. In October 2014, Cașcaval signed a contract with Costuleni.

In February 2015, he moved on a free transfer to Uzbek club Olmaliq FK and signed a one-year contract with the club. Following his departure from Olmaliq, Cașcaval remained in Uzbekistan and signed for Neftchi Fergana. In 2016, Cașcaval returned to Moldova, to sign for Dinamo-Auto Tiraspol, making 10 league appearances before moving to Russian Football National League club Luch-Energiya Vladivostok. In 2017, Cașcaval moved countries again, signing for Maltese club Naxxar Lions. In March 2018, he signed for Faroese club Víkingur.

On 30 November 2018, following the culmination of the 2018 Faroe Islands Premier League, Cașcaval signed for National League South club Chelmsford City. On 9 May 2019, Cașcaval was released by Chelmsford. However, on 22 July 2019, Chelmsford announced they had re-signed Cașcaval. On 21 February 2020, Chelmsford announced Cașcaval had left the club via mutual consent. In September 2020, Cașcaval signed for Isthmian League North Division club Romford.

== International career ==
On 11 November 2011, Cașcaval made his debut for Moldova in a 2–0 defeat against Georgia.
