= Samu Laitinen =

Finnish footballer (born 1999)

Personal information
- Full name: Samu Laitinen
- Date of birth: 13 August 1999 (age 27)
- Place of birth: Helsinki, Finland
- Position: Right-back

Youth career
- FC Kontu
- HJK Helsinki

Senior career*
Years	Team	Apps	(Gls)
2016–2019	Klubi 04	37	(0)
2018–2019	HJK Helsinki	2	(0)
2020	GBK	5	(0)
2020	KPV	13	(0)
2021	Gnistan	5	(0)

International career
2016	Finland U18	2	(0)
2018	Finland U19	1	(0)
- * Club domestic league appearances and goals as of 08:36, 24 December 2021 (UTC)

Samu Laitinen (born 13 August 1999) is a Finnish professional footballer, who plays as a forward.

== Club career ==
=== HJK ===
Laitinen is a product of FC Kontu and later joined HJK Helsinki, where he made his debut for the clubs second team, Klubi 04, in 2016. On 2 February 2017, he got his official debut for HJK in the Finnish Cup at the age of 17 against IF Gnistan.

In 2018, he became a regular starter for Klubi and on 8 September 2018, he also got his Veikkausliiga debut for HJK against FC Inter Turku. He started on the bench, before replacing Riku Riski for the last couple of minutes. Laitinen got his contract further extended for the 2019 season but with only one game four games in the whole 2019 season, he left the club at the end of the year.

=== KPV ===
On 4 December 2019 it was confirmed, that Laitinen had joined KPV on a one-year deal. Laitinen made his debut for KPV on 25 January 2020 against AC Oulu in the Finnish Cup.

=== IF Gnistan ===
On 5 February 2021, Laitinen moved to fellow league club IF Gnistan on a one-year deal. He made his debut on 13 February 2021 against JIPPO. in the Suomen Cup.
