= Juho Laitinen =

Finnish farmer, cooperative organizer and politician (1871–1946)

Juho Laitinen (3 May 1871 – 13 October 1946) was a Finnish farmer, cooperative organizer and politician, born in Hankasalmi. He was a member of the Parliament of Finland from 1916 to 1917, representing the Young Finnish Party.
