= Mikko Kuningas =

Finnish footballer (born 1997)

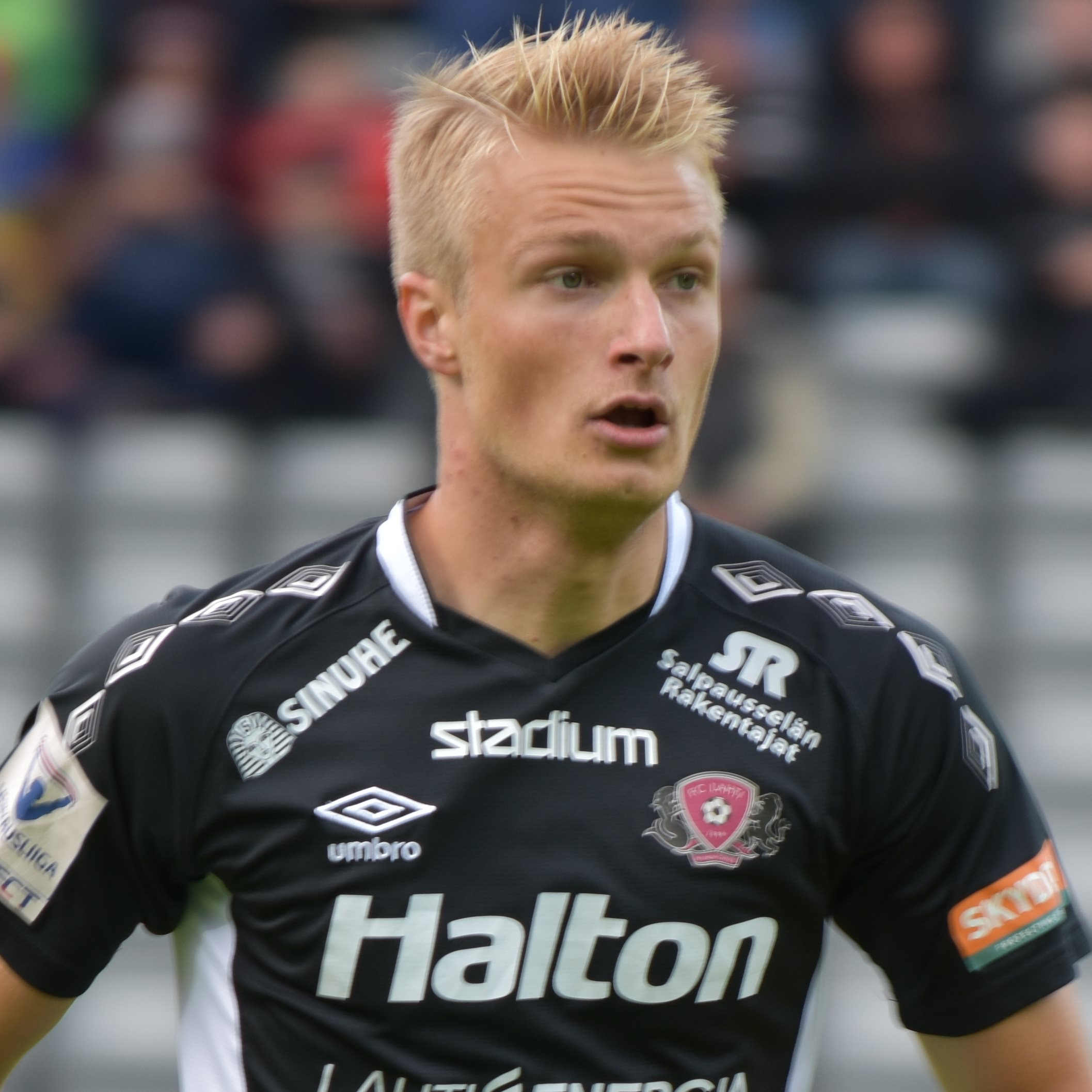
- Kuningas with Lahti in 2017

Personal information
- Date of birth: 30 July 1997 (age 29)
- Place of birth: Luumäki, Finland
- Positions: Midfielder; forward

Team information
- Current team: Käpylän Pallo
- Number: 25

Youth career
- PEPO

Senior career*
Years	Team	Apps	(Gls)
2015–2017	Lahti	62	(5)
2015–2016	→ Lahti Akatemia	12	(3)
2018–2019	Inter Turku	52	(2)
2020	Lahti	22	(3)
2021–2022	Orange County SC	49	(5)
2023	Lahti	23	(0)
2024	Käpylän Pallo	6	(2)
2025	Crema	7	(0)
2025–	Käpylän Pallo	30	(4)

International career
2015	Finland U18	8	(1)
2016	Finland U19	3	(0)
2017	Finland U21	5	(0)
- * Club domestic league appearances and goals as of 20 October 2026

Mikko Kuningas (born 30 July 1997) is a Finnish professional footballer who plays as a midfielder for Käpylän Pallo.

== Club career ==
Kuningas has played for PEPO Lappeenranta, Lahti, Lahti Akatemia and FC Inter Turku. Kuningas started his football career in Luumäen Pojat where he played his first junior years. Kuningas played same time in PEPO Lappeenranta and he made his debut with the PEPO first team in 2014.

Kuningas made the professional contract with FC Lahti in 2014. He made the debut in Veikkausliiga against FC Ilves on 19 July 2015 and he made the winning goal at the beginning of the second half.

In 2015, Kuningas visited Brazil to get acquainted with the activities of Fluminense FC. He was invited to European high-level tournaments Spax Cup in Germany and Terborg Tournament in Holland according to the Fluminense FC U19-team. The club management of the Fluminense FC wanted to hire him with a loan agreement from summer 2016. The transfer eventually failed with paperwork.

Kuningas signed a contract with FC Inter Turku for the season 2018. FC Inter Turku won the Finnish Cup in May 2018 against HJK Helsinki 0-1 (0-0). Kuningas scored the winning goal in the 82. minute. He had been substituted to the field a moment earlier.

In the season 2019 FC Inter Turku and Kuningas finished second place in Veikkausliiga.

On 18 December 2020, USL Championship club Orange County SC announced the signing of Kuningas.

On 18 January 2023, Kuningas returned to Lahti on a one-year contract.

On 15 August 2024, after being without club since January, Kuningas signed with Ykkösliiga club Käpylän Pallo (KäPa) for the rest of the season.

In February 2025, he joined AC Crema in Italian Serie D.

On 8 July, Kuningas returned to Käpylän Pallo on a deal throughout the 2027 season.

== International career ==
He has represented Finland at under-18 and under-19 youth level.

== Career statistics ==
As of 24 April 2025

Appearances and goals by club, season and competition
Club	Season	League			Cup (Note: Includes Suomen Cup and US Open Cup)		League cup (Note: Includes Finnish League Cup)		Europe		Total	
Club	Season	Division	Apps	Goals	Apps	Goals	Apps	Goals	Apps	Goals	Apps	Goals
PEPO	2014	Kolmonen	18	7	–		–		–		18	7
Lahti Akatemia	2015	Kakkonen	11	3	–		–		–		11	3
Lahti Akatemia	2016	Kakkonen	1	0	–		–		–		1	0
Lahti Akatemia	Total		12	3	0	0	0	0	0	0	12	3
Lahti	2015	Veikkausliiga	10	1	–		–		–		10	1
Lahti	2016	Veikkausliiga	25	2	4	1	5	1	0	0	34	4
Lahti	2017	Veikkausliiga	27	2	4	0	–		–		31	2
Lahti	Total		62	5	8	1	5	1	0	0	75	7
Inter Turku	2018	Veikkausliiga	28	2	6	2	–		–		34	4
Inter Turku	2019	Veikkausliiga	24	0	7	1	–		2 (Note: Appearances in UEFA Europa League)	0	33	1
Inter Turku	Total		52	2	13	3	0	0	2	0	67	5
Lahti	2020	Veikkausliiga	22	3	3	2	–		–		25	5
Orange County SC	2021	USL Championship	33	3	0	0	–		–		33	3
Orange County SC	2022	USL Championship	16	1	2	1	–		–		18	2
Orange County SC	Total		49	4	2	1	0	0	0	0	51	5
Lahti	2023	Veikkausliiga	23	0	2	0	4	0	–		29	0
Käpylän Pallo	2024	Ykkösliiga	6	2	–		–		–		6	2
Crema	2024–25	Serie D	7	0	0	0	–		–		7	0
Käpylän Pallo	2025	Ykkösliiga	0	0	–		–		–		0	0
Career total			246	26	28	7	9	1	2	0	285	34

== Honours ==
Lahti

- Finnish League Cup: 2016

Inter Turku

- Veikkausliiga runner-up: 2019
- Finnish Cup: 2018

Orange County

- USL Championship: 2021

Individual

- Rookie of the Year: 2015
