= Ibrahima Gueye (footballer, born 1996) =

Senegalese footballer

Personal information
- Full name: Ibrahima Khalil Gueye
- Date of birth: 8 October 1996 (age 30)
- Place of birth: Senegal
- Height: 1.78 m (5 ft 10 in)
- Position: Forward

Senior career*
Years	Team	Apps	(Gls)
2015–2019	FC Sion	1	(0)
2016–2019	FC Sion II		
2018	→ VPS (loan)	28	(3)
2019	FC Wil 1900 II		
- * Club domestic league appearances and goals as of 19:31, 3 October 2022 (UTC)

Ibrahima Khalil Gueye (born 8 October 1996) is a Senegalese professional footballer who plays as a forward.
