= Riku Riski =

Finnish footballer (born 1989)

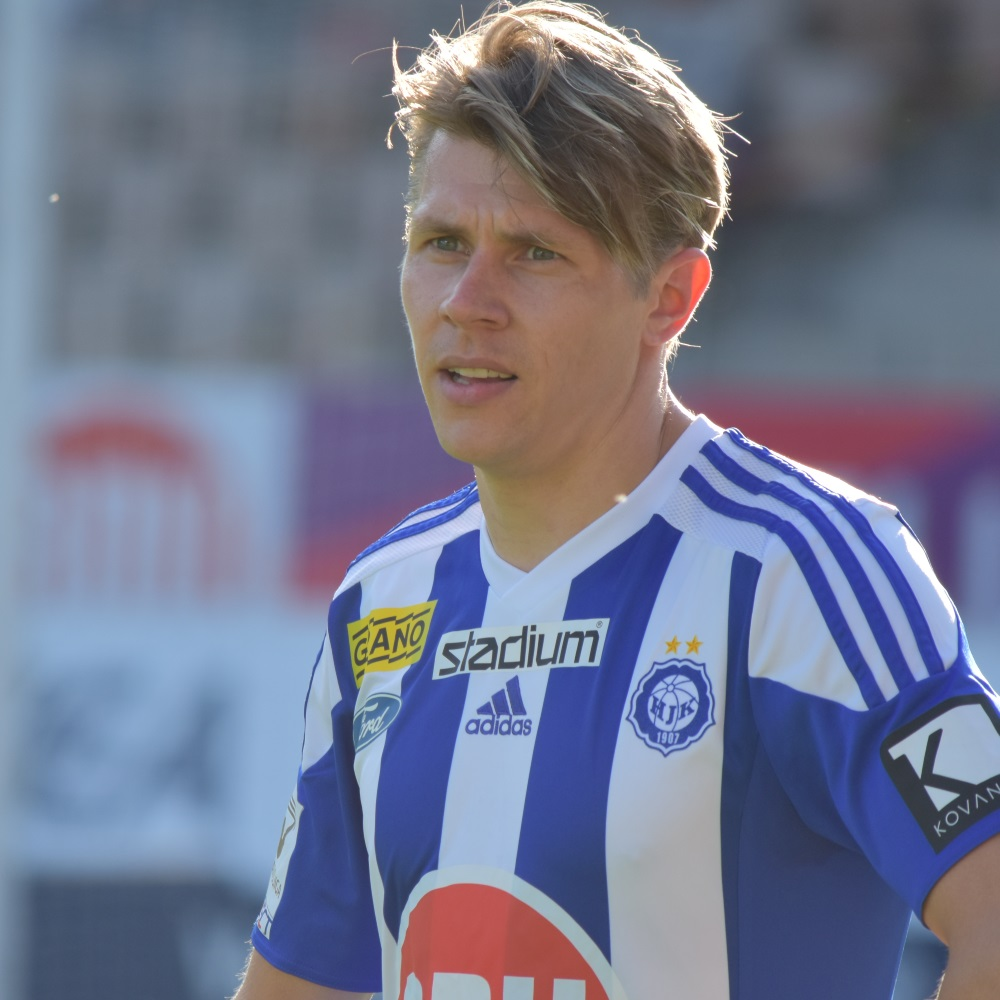
- Riku Riski with HJK in 2018

Personal information
- Full name: Riku Olavi Riski
- Date of birth: 16 August 1989 (age 37)
- Place of birth: Masku, Finland
- Height: 1.74 m (5 ft 9 in)
- Positions: Forward; winger

Team information
- Current team: TPS
- Number: 10

Youth career
- MaPS
- TPS

Senior career*
Years	Team	Apps	(Gls)
2006–2010	TPS	82	(17)
2011–2012	Widzew Łódź	12	(0)
2011	→ Örebro (loan)	7	(1)
2012–2013	Hønefoss	55	(20)
2014–2016	Rosenborg	48	(9)
2015	→ IFK Göteborg (loan)	11	(1)
2016	→ Dundee United (loan)	3	(0)
2016–2018	Odd	37	(2)
2018–2022	HJK	85	(19)
2023–	TPS	46	(10)

International career
2009–2010	Finland U21	10	(2)
2011–2017	Finland	28	(4)
- * Club domestic league appearances and goals as of 23 November 2025

Riku Olavi Riski (born 16 August 1989) is a Finnish professional footballer who plays for Finnish club TPS. He has previously played for HJK in Finland, Widzew Łódź in Poland, Hønefoss BK, Rosenborg BK and Odds BK in Norway, and has also had loan spells with Örebro SK and IFK Göteborg in Sweden and Dundee United in Scotland. He has also represented Finland in international football.

== Career ==
=== Club ===
Riski was born in Masku on 16 August 1989. He played his first game for Turun Palloseura in the Veikkausliiga when he was only 16 years old. In January 2011, the midfielder joined Polish club Widzew Łódź on a three-and-a-half-year contract.

On 30 August 2011, he was loaned for six months to Örebro SK in Sweden. On 12 September, Riski made his Allsvenskan debut, playing 90 minutes and scoring once against AIK. On 5 January 2012, he signed a three-year contract with freshly promoted Hønefoss BK.

On 30 December 2013, he signed a four-year contract with Norwegian side Rosenborg BK.

On 5 August 2015, he was loaned for five months to IFK Göteborg in Sweden.

On 8 January 2016, Riski signed a loan deal with Scottish Premiership side Dundee United.

He returned to TPS on 3 February 2023, signing a 2+1 year deal.

=== International ===
Riski was a member of Finland national under-21 football team during the 2011 Euro U21 qualifying. He made his senior national team debut on 9 February 2011 against Belgium. He scored a goal against Turkey B team in a 0−1 away win on 25 March 2011.

Riski turned down a call-up to the Finland squad for a winter training camp and two friendly matches in Qatar during January 2019, citing "ethical reasons and the values I wanted to act upon".

== Personal life ==
He is the older brother of Roope Riski, who plays for Veikkausliiga club Ilves.

== Career statistics ==
=== Club ===
As of match played 2 June 2025

Appearances and goals by club, season and competition
Club	Season	League			National Cup		Continental		Other		Total	
Club	Season	Division	Apps	Goals	Apps	Goals	Apps	Goals	Apps	Goals	Apps	Goals
TPS Turku	2006	Veikkausliiga	9	1	0	0	-		-		9	1
TPS Turku	2007	Veikkausliiga	6	0	0	0	-		-		6	0
TPS Turku	2008	Veikkausliiga	20	5	0	0	-		-		20	5
TPS Turku	2009	Veikkausliiga	22	5	0	0	-		-		22	5
TPS Turku	2010	Veikkausliiga	25	6	6	6	4	3	-		35	15
TPS Turku	Total		82	17	6	6	4	3	-	-	92	26
Widzew Łódź	2010–11	Ekstraklasa	9	0	0	0	-		-		9	0
Widzew Łódź	2011–12	Ekstraklasa	3	0	0	0	-		-		3	0
Widzew Łódź	Total		12	0	0	0	-	-	-	-	12	0
Örebro (loan)	2011	Allsvenskan	7	1	0	0	-		-		7	1
Hønefoss	2012	Tippeligaen	26	10	3	0	-		-		29	10
Hønefoss	2013	Tippeligaen	29	10	2	1	-		-		31	11
Hønefoss	Total		55	20	5	1	-	-	-	-	60	21
Rosenborg	2014	Tippeligaen	29	8	2	0	6	0	-		37	8
Rosenborg	2015	Tippeligaen	16	1	2	2	5	0	-		23	3
Rosenborg	2016	Tippeligaen	3	0	3	1	-		-		6	1
Rosenborg	Total		48	9	7	3	11	0	-	-	66	12
Göteborg (loan)	2015	Allsvenskan	11	1	0	0	-		-		11	1
Dundee United (loan)	2015–16	Scottish Premiership	3	0	0	0	-		-		3	0
Odd	2016	Tippeligaen	14	0	0	0	-		-		14	0
Odd	2017	Eliteserien	23	2	4	3	5	0	-		32	5
Odd	Total		37	2	4	3	5	0	-	-	46	5
HJK	2018	Veikkausliiga	22	6	5	2	6	0	-		33	8
HJK	2019	Veikkausliiga	19	7	5	2	6	3	-		30	12
HJK	2020	Veikkausliiga	21	4	9	3	-		-		30	7
HJK	2021	Veikkausliiga	24	2	6	1	13	4	-		43	7
HJK	2022	Veikkausliiga	1	0	0	0	0	0	1	0	2	0
HJK	Total		87	19	25	8	25	7	-	-	137	34
Klubi-04	2018	Kakkonen	1	0	0	0	-		-		1	0
Klubi-04	2022	Kakkonen	5	1	-		-		-		5	1
Klubi-04	Total		6	1	0	0	0	0	-	-	6	1
TPS	2023	Ykkönen	18	5	1	0	–		3	1	22	6
TPS	2024	Ykkösliiga	18	3	3	0	–		0	0	21	3
TPS	2025	Ykkösliiga	1	1	0	0	–		0	0	1	1
TPS	Total		37	9	4	0	0	0	3	1	44	10
Career total			385	79	51	21	45	10	4	1	485	111

=== International ===
As of 7 September 2014

Finland national team
Year	Apps	Goals
2011	4	0
2012	5	1
2013	6	1
2014	8	2
2015	3	0
2016	0	0
Total	26	4

=== International goals ===
#	Date	Location	Opponent	Score	Result	Competition
1.	22 January 2012	Port of Spain, Trinidad and Tobago	Trinidad and Tobago	1−1	2−3	Friendly
2.	16 November 2013	Cardiff, Wales	Wales	1−1	1−1	Friendly
3.	7 September 2014	Tórshavn, Faroe Islands	Faroe Islands	1−1	1−3	UEFA Euro 2016 qualifying
4.	7 September 2014	Tórshavn, Faroe Islands	Faroe Islands	1−2	1−3	UEFA Euro 2016 qualifying

== Honours ==
TPS

- Finnish Cup: 2010

HJK

- Veikkausliiga: 2018, 2020, 2021, 2022
- Finnish Cup: 2020

Individual

- Veikkausliiga Team of the Year: 2020, 2021
