= 2017 SJK season =

SJK
2017 season
- Chairman: Raimo Sarajärvi
- Manager: Sixten Boström (until 1 June); Manuel Roca (from 2 June until 9 September); Brian Page & Toni Lehtinen (from 9 September)
- Stadium: OmaSP Stadion
- Veikkausliiga: 6th
- Finnish Cup: Runner-up
- UEFA Europa League: First qualifying round vs KR
- Top goalscorer: League: Billy Ions (12); All: Billy Ions (14)
Home colours	Away colours

The 2017 season is Seinäjoen Jalkapallokerho's 10th competitive season, and fourth in the Veikkausliiga. After finishing 3rd in the 2016 Veikkausliiga season, SJK entered the 2017–18 UEFA Europa League first qualifying round.

== Squad ==
As of 19 July 2017

Note: Flags indicate national team as defined under FIFA eligibility rules; some limited exceptions apply. Players may hold more than one non-FIFA nationality.

No.	Pos.	Nation	Player
2	DF	FIN	Joel Mero
3	DF	AND	Marc Vales
4	DF	WAL	Richie Dorman
5	DF	FIN	Dani Hatakka (on loan from Brann)
6	MF	FIN	Matej Hradecky
7	DF	FIN	Timo Tahvanainen
8	MF	FIN	Johannes Laaksonen
9	FW	ESP	Sergi Arimany
10	FW	ENG	Billy Ions
11	MF	FIN	Tomas Hradecky
14	FW	ENG	Kaine Sheppard
15	MF	FIN	Matti Klinga
16	DF	FIN	Joonas Sundman
17	MF	FIN	Ville Tikkanen
18	DF	FIN	Jarkko Hurme

No.	Pos.	Nation	Player
19	MF	FIN	Obed Malolo
20	DF	FIN	Arttu Aromaa
22	DF	ESP	Diego Bardanca
25	FW	FIN	Elias Ahde
26	MF	FIN	Jesse Sarajärvi
29	DF	ESP	Chema Antón
31	GK	FIN	Paavo Valakari
33	GK	EST	Mihkel Aksalu (captain)
37	FW	COD	Aristote Mboma
58	MF	KOS	Mehmet Hetemaj
80	MF	FIN	Erfan Zeneli
99	FW	FIN	Vahid Hambo
—	GK	BRA	Luís Fernando
—	MF	COL	Cristian Echavarría

== Transfers ==
=== Winter ===
In: Note: Flags indicate national team as defined under FIFA eligibility rules; some limited exceptions apply. Players may hold more than one non-FIFA nationality.

No.	Pos.	Nation	Player
5	DF	FIN	Dani Hatakka (loan from (Norway) Brann)
9	FW	CMR	Anatole Abang (loan from (United States) New York Red Bulls)
11	MF	FIN	Tomas Hradecky (from (Czech Republic) Bohemians 1905)
19	MF	FIN	Obed Malolo (from (Finland) HJK)
21	DF	URU	Facundo Guichón (from (Spain) UCAM Murcia)
22	DF	ESP	Diego Bardanca (from (Spain) Real Jaén)
29	DF	ESP	Chema Antón (from (Spain) Eldense)
37	FW	COD	Aristote M'Boma (from (Finland) AC Oulu)
80	MF	FIN	Erfan Zeneli (from (Finland) Inter Turku)

Out: Note: Flags indicate national team as defined under FIFA eligibility rules; some limited exceptions apply. Players may hold more than one non-FIFA nationality.

No.	Pos.	Nation	Player
1	MF	FIN	Jere Koponen (to (Finland) Inter Turku)
2	DF	SEN	El-Hadji Gana Kane (to (Norway) Sandefjord)
3	DF	FIN	Juhani Ojala (to (Sweden) Häcken)
5	DF	FIN	Henri Aalto (to (Germany) VfB Oldenburg)
9	MF	FIN	Jussi Vasara (Retired)
10	FW	CMR	Ariel Ngueukam (to (Finland) Ilves)
13	FW	FIN	Roope Riski (loan to (Germany) SC Paderborn)
14	FW	FIN	Toni Lehtinen
17	DF	FIN	Teemu Penninkangas (to (Finland) Ilves)
19	DF	FIN	Youness Rahimi (to (Finland) Ilves)
24	DF	ESP	Aimar (to (Spain) Cornellà)
27	FW	FIN	Aleksis Lehtonen
53	DF	FIN	Joona Ala-Hukkala

=== Summer ===
In: Note: Flags indicate national team as defined under FIFA eligibility rules; some limited exceptions apply. Players may hold more than one non-FIFA nationality.

No.	Pos.	Nation	Player
2	DF	FIN	Joel Mero (from (Germany) Borussia Mönchengladbach II)
9	FW	ESP	Sergi Arimany (from (Spain) Leioa)
14	FW	ENG	Kaine Sheppard (from (Australia) Heidelberg United)
16	DF	FIN	Joonas Sundman (from (England) Aston Villa)
99	FW	FIN	Vahid Hambo (from (England) Brighton & Hove Albion)
—	FW	COL	Cristian Echavarría (from (Colombia) Independiente Medellín)

Out: Note: Flags indicate national team as defined under FIFA eligibility rules; some limited exceptions apply. Players may hold more than one non-FIFA nationality.

No.	Pos.	Nation	Player
9	FW	CMR	Anatole Abang (loan return to (United States) New York Red Bulls)
13	FW	FIN	Roope Riski (to (Austria) SKN St. Pölten, previously on loan to (Germany) SC Paderborn)
21	MF	URU	Facundo Guichón

== Competitions ==
=== Veikkausliiga ===
==== League table ====
Pos	Team	Pld	W	D	L	GF	GA	GD	Pts	Qualification or relegation
4	Lahti	33	12	13	8	46	31	+15	49	Qualification for the Europa League first qualifying round (Note: Since HJK, winners of the 2016–17 Finnish Cup, qualified for the Champions League first qualifying round, the spot awarded to the cup winner (Europa League first qualifying round) is passed to the next best-placed team (in this case to the fourth-placed team).)
5	IFK Mariehamn	33	13	10	10	44	42	+2	49	
6	SJK	33	13	8	12	42	47	−5	47	
7	RoPS	33	12	6	15	43	51	−8	42	
8	VPS	33	9	12	12	38	51	−13	39	

Updated to match(es) played on 28 October 2017. Source: Veikkausliiga (in Finnish), Soccerway
Rules for classification: 1) Points; 2) Goal difference; 3) Goals scored; 4) Head-to-head points; 5) Head-to-head goal difference; 6) Head-to-head away goals scored; 7) Play-off
(Note: Play-off is only played if need to decide champion, teams for relegation or UEFA competition and will be played on a neutral ground).

==== Results summary ====
Overall								Home						Away					
Pld	W	D	L	GF	GA	GD	Pts	W	D	L	GF	GA	GD	W	D	L	GF	GA	GD
33	13	8	12	42	47	−5	47	7	4	5	20	23	−3	6	4	7	22	24	−2

Last updated: 28 October 2017.
Source: See Results

==== Results by matchday ====
Matchday	1	2	3	4	5	6	7	8	9	10	11	12	13	14	15	16	17	18	19	20	21	22	23	24	25	26	27	28	29	30	31	32	33
Ground	H	A	H	A	H	A	H	H	A	H	A	H	A	A	A	H	A	A	H	A	A	A	H	H	A	H	A	H	A	H	A	A	H
Result	D	W	L	L	D	L	W	W	D	D	L	L	W	L	L	W	W	W	W	D	L	W	W	L	L	W	W	D	L	L	D	D	W

Updated to match(es) played on 28 October 2017. Source: See results
A = Away; H = Home; W = Win; D = Draw; L = Loss

==== Results ====
5 April 2017 1	SJK	1 – 1	Lahti	Seinäjoki
18:30 EEST (UTC+3)	Dorman (yellow card) 27'; Ions 72' (pen.)	Report	Simonovski 82'; Helmke (yellow card) 85'	Stadium: OmaSP Stadion; Attendance: 2,679; Referee: Jari Järvinen

8 April 2017 2	VPS	1 – 3	SJK	Vaasa
16:00 EEST (UTC+3)	Lähde (yellow card) 13'; J.Vahtera 24'; Jürgenson (yellow card) 90'	Report	Ions 9', 47'; Guichón 57'; Tahvanainen (yellow card) 71'; Bardanca (yellow card) 76'; Hatakka (yellow card) 86'	Stadium: Hietalahti Stadium; Attendance: 3,059; Referee: Dennis Antamo

15 April 2017 3	SJK	1 – 2	Ilves	Seinäjoki
15:30 EEST (UTC+3)	Guichón (yellow card) 24'; Dorman (yellow card) 37'; Zeneli 53'	Report	Rahimi 37' (pen.); Ngueukam 63'; Ala-Myllymäki (yellow card) 68'	Stadium: OmaSP Stadion; Attendance: 3,088; Referee: Jani Laaksonen

22 April 2017 4	PS Kemi	3 – 1	SJK	Kemi
16:00 EEST (UTC+3)	Zea (yellow card) 28' (goal) 78'; Aalto 43'; David (yellow card) 71'; Valenčič 80'	Report	Zeneli (yellow card) 26'; T.Hradecky 65'; Bardanca (yellow card) 77'; Abang (yellow card) 86'	Stadium: Sauvosaaren Urheilupuisto; Attendance: 844; Referee: Antti Munukka

28 April 2017 5	SJK	3 – 3	HIFK	Seinäjoki
20:00 EEST (UTC+3)	Abang (yellow card) 10'; Guichón 68'; Mboma 90+2'; Ions 90+4' (pen.)	Report	Sihvola 29', 52', 79'; Maanoja (yellow card) 60'; K.Raimi (yellow card) 90+3'	Stadium: OmaSP Stadion; Attendance: 2,243; Referee: Kalle Mäkinen

6 May 2017 6	Lahti	1 – 0	SJK	Lahti
17:00 EEST (UTC+3)	Stênio (yellow card) 41' (goal) 82'	Report	Laaksonen (yellow card) 38'; T.Hradecky (yellow card) 71'; Tahvanainen (yellow card) 86'	Stadium: Lahti Stadium; Attendance: 1,853; Referee: Antti Munukka

12 May 2017 7	SJK	1 – 0	JJK	Seinäjoki
20:00 EEST (UTC+3)	Zeneli 65'; Guichón (yellow card) 81'; M'Boma (yellow card) 85'	Report	S.Vielma (yellow card) 89'	Stadium: OmaSP Stadion; Attendance: 2,554; Referee: Antti Munukka

19 May 2017 8	SJK	3 – 0	RoPS	Seinäjoki
20:00 EEST (UTC+3)	Ylätupa 23' (o.g.); M'Boma 25', 73'	Report	Eze (yellow card) 57'	Stadium: OmaSP Stadion; Attendance: 3,644; Referee: Marko Grönholm

24 May 2017 9	KuPS	1 – 1	SJK	Kuopio
18:30 EEST (UTC+3)	Sorsa (yellow card) 35'; Salami (yellow card) 38'; Saxman (yellow card) 45+3'; J.Mäkelä 90+1'	Report	Laaksonen 13'	Stadium: Kuopio Football Stadium; Attendance: 2,875; Referee: Kalle Mäkinen

27 May 2017 10	SJK	1 – 1	IFK Mariehamn	Seinäjoki
18:00 EEST (UTC+3)	Hetemaj 52'; Guichón (yellow card) 67'	Report	Kangaskolkka 17' (yellow card) 67'	Stadium: OmaSP Stadion; Attendance: 2,978; Referee: Oskari Hämäläinen

31 May 2017 11	HJK	6 – 0	SJK	Helsinki
18:30 EEST (UTC+3)	Onovo 1'; Mensah 8'; Jalasto 12'; Yaghoubi 23'; Morelos 58', 90'	Report	Hetemaj (yellow card) 15'	Stadium: Telia 5G -areena Referee: Ville Nevalainen

3 June 2017 12	SJK	0 – 3	Inter Turku	Seinäjoki
18:00 EEST (UTC+3)	Zeneli (yellow card) 32'; Hetemaj (yellow card) 58'; Hurme (yellow card) 90+3'; Guichón (yellow card) 90+6'	Report	Källman (yellow card) 18' (goal) 22', 53'; Manev (yellow card) 90+1'; Kandji 90+5'	Stadium: OmaSP Stadion; Attendance: 2,665; Referee: Atte Jussila

14 June 2017 13	HIFK	0 – 2	SJK	Helsinki
18:30 EEST (UTC+3)	Lody (yellow card) 71'	Report	Ions 7', 90+3'; Tahvanainen (yellow card) 90+2'	Stadium: Telia 5G -areena Referee: Mattias Gestranius

17 June 2017 14	SJK	0 – 1	VPS	Seinäjoki
15:00 EEST (UTC+3)	Klinga (yellow card) 29'; Guichón (yellow card) 45+2'; Hetemaj (yellow card) 52'; Dorman (yellow card) 90+5'	Report	Lähde (yellow card) 46'; J.Engström 73'	Stadium: OmaSP Stadion; Attendance: 4,023; Referee: Ville Nevalainen

22 June 2017 15	Ilves	1 – 0	SJK	Tampere
18:30 EEST (UTC+3)	Ngueukam 77'	Report	Hatakka (yellow card) 34'; T.Hradecky (yellow card) 67'; Vales (yellow card) 90+1'; Ions (yellow card) 90+3'	Stadium: Tammelan Stadion; Attendance: 2,846; Referee: Jari Järvinen

26 June 2017 16	SJK	1 – 0	PS Kemi	Seinäjoki
18:30 EEST (UTC+3)	T.Hradecky 4'; Hatakka (yellow card) 26'; Hetemaj (yellow card) 70'; Aksalu (yellow card) 90+3'	Report		Stadium: OmaSP Stadion; Attendance: 2,857; Referee: Ville Nevalainen

16 July 2017 17	JJK	0 – 2	SJK	Jyväskylä
18:30 EEST (UTC+3)	Nieminen (yellow card) 27'	Report	M'Boma 5'; Klinga (yellow card) 61'; Vales (yellow card) 67'; Arimany 84'	Stadium: Harjun stadion Attendance: 1,745; Referee: Jani Laaksonen

23 July 2017 18	RoPS	1 – 2	SJK	Rovaniemi
18:30 EEST (UTC+3)	L.Väisänen (yellow card) 30'; Lappalainen 75'; Stavitski (yellow card) 88'	Report	Vales (yellow card) 33'; Arimany (yellow card) 41'; A.Nurmela 53' (o.g.); Hetemaj (yellow card) 77'; Malolo 83'; Aksalu (yellow card) 90+3'	Stadium: Rovaniemen keskuskenttä Attendance: 2,356; Referee: Dennis Antamo

31 July 2017 19	SJK	1 – 0	KuPS	Seinäjoki
19:30 EEST (UTC+3)	M'Boma 52'; Hurme (yellow card) 65'	Report	Gabriel (yellow card) 47'	Stadium: OmaSP Stadion; Attendance: 3,821; Referee: Marko Grönholm

6 August 2017 20	IFK Mariehamn	0 – 0	SJK	Mariehamn
15:00 EEST (UTC+3)	Sid (yellow card) 53'; Petrović (yellow card) 67'	Report	Bardanca (yellow card) 44'; Sundman (yellow card) 67'	Stadium: Wiklöf Holding Arena; Attendance: 1,012; Referee: Jani Laaksonen

10 August 2017 21	SJK	0 – 6	HJK	Seinäjoki
20:00 EEST (UTC+3)	Hetemaj (yellow card) 33'; T.Hradecky (yellow card) 90+1'	Report	Rafinha 7'; Yaghoubi (yellow card) 45+3'; Dahlström 59'; Valenčič 63'; Mensah 65'; Pelvas 75', 80' (pen.)	Stadium: OmaSP Stadion; Attendance: 4,005; Referee: Kalle Mäkinen

14 August 2017 22	Inter Turku	0 – 1	SJK	Turku
18:30 EEST (UTC+3)		Report	Bardanca (yellow card) 27'; Ions 38'; Malolo (yellow card) 47'; Sundman (yellow card) 80'; Aksalu (yellow card) 90'	Stadium: Veritas Stadion; Attendance: 3,512; Referee: Antti Munukka

19 August 2017 23	SJK	1 – 0	Lahti	Seinäjoki
18:00 EEST (UTC+3)	Malolo (yellow card) 58'; Hatakka 64'; Tahvanainen (yellow card) 89'; Aksalu (yellow card) 90+1'; Ions (yellow card) 90+4'	Report		Stadium: OmaSP Stadion; Attendance: 3,367; Referee: Oskari Hämäläinen

26 August 2017 24	SJK	0 – 4	JJK	Seinäjoki
18:00 EEST (UTC+3)		Report	Nieminen 57'; Poutiainen 59'; Petrescu 71'; S.Jovović 73'; Lähitie (yellow card) 83'	Stadium: OmaSP Stadion; Attendance: 2,832; Referee: Mohammad Al Emara

8 September 2017 25	KuPS	2 – 1	SJK	Kuopio
18:30 EEST (UTC+3)	J.Mäkelä 22'; H.Coulibaly 88'	Report	Hatakka (yellow card) 49' (goal) 76'	Stadium: Kuopio Football Stadium; Attendance: 2,193; Referee: Antti Munukka

11 September 2017 26	SJK	2 – 1	VPS	Seinäjoki
19:30 EEST (UTC+3)	Ions 21' (yellow card) 71'; M'Boma 45+1' (yellow card) 52'; Hurme (yellow card) 73'	Report	Koskimaa 15'; J.Vahtera (yellow card) 75'	Stadium: OmaSP Stadion; Attendance: 3,877; Referee: Ville Nevalainen

16 September 2017 27	RoPS	0 – 3	SJK	Rovaniemi
17:00 EEST (UTC+3)	S.Roiha (yellow card) 24' (yellow-red card) 65'; Stavitski (yellow card) 64'; L.Väisänen (yellow card) 74'	Report	Mero 9'; Laaksonen (yellow card) 39'; J.Sundman (yellow card) 54'; Bardanca (yellow card) 75'; Ions 84'; T.Hradecky (yellow card) 87'; Sarajärvi 90+2'	Stadium: Rovaniemen keskuskenttä Attendance: 1,412; Referee: Atte Jussila

27 September 2017 28	SJK	0 – 0	Ilves	Seinäjoki
19:30 EEST (UTC+3)	Vales (yellow card) 59'; Arimany (yellow card) 70'; Laaksonen (yellow card) 90'	Report	Rahimi (yellow card) 36'	Stadium: OmaSP Stadion; Attendance: 2,439; Referee: Jari Järvinen

1 October 2017 29	IFK Mariehamn	2 – 1	SJK	Mariehamn
18:30 EEST (UTC+3)	Kojola (yellow card) 45'; Kangaskolkka 60' (pen.); Sid 78'; M.Nordqvist (yellow card) 90+1'	Report	J.Sundman (yellow card) 16'; Hetemaj (yellow card) 69'; Zeneli (yellow card) 80'; Hambo 89'	Stadium: Wiklöf Holding Arena; Attendance: 1,274; Referee: Petri Viljanen

12 October 2017 30	SJK	0 – 2	HJK	Seinäjoki
20:00 EEST (UTC+3)	Hatakka (yellow card) 53'; Laaksonen (yellow card) 55'; Hurme (yellow card) 77'; Hambo (yellow card) 86'; Klinga (yellow card) 90+3'	Report	Savage 18'; Annan (yellow card) 75'; Lingman 88'	Stadium: OmaSP Stadion; Attendance: 2,135; Referee: Mikko Mörö

15 October 2017 30	PS Kemi	3 – 3	SJK	Kemi
15:00 EEST (UTC+3)	Tano (yellow card) 36'; Ceesay (yellow card) 43' (goal) 47'; Mošnikov (yellow card) 45+1' (goal) 50' (pen.); Zea (yellow card) 52'; Jama 65'	Report	Hetemaj 34' (yellow card) 55'; Hambo (yellow card) 41'; Zeneli 70'; Mero 78'; Hatakka (yellow card) 81'	Stadium: Sauvosaaren Urheilupuisto; Attendance: 838; Referee: Ville Nevalainen

20 October 2017 32	HIFK	2 – 2	SJK	Helsinki
18:30 EEST (UTC+3)	Terävä (yellow card) 77'; Forssell 81', 90+2'	Report	Ions 11', 32'; Malolo (yellow card) 80'	Stadium: Telia 5G -areena Attendance: 2,563; Referee: Marko Grönholm

28 October 2017 33	SJK	5 – 0	Inter Turku	Seinäjoki
14:00 EEST (UTC+3)	Zeneli 7'; Ions 20'; Mero (red card) 26'; Sarajärvi 45', 68'; Hurme 51' (yellow card) 71'; Sundman (yellow card) 85'	Report	Mäntylä (yellow card) 71'	Stadium: OmaSP Stadion; Attendance: 1,432; Referee: Jari Järvinen

=== Finnish Cup ===
==== Sixth Round ====
Team	Pld	W	D	L	GF	GA	GD	Pts
FF Jaro	5	4	0	1	18	4	+14	12
VPS	5	4	0	1	16	5	+11	12
SJK	5	3	0	2	20	6	+14	9
FC Jazz	5	2	0	3	8	19	−11	6
MuSa	5	1	0	4	3	14	−11	3
SJK Akatemia	5	1	0	4	9	26	−17	3

20 January 2017 1	SJK	7 – 0	SJK Akatemia	Seinäjoki
19:15 EET (UTC+2)	Ojala 15'; Ahde 32', 50'; Hetemaj 71' (pen.), 73', 90'; Klinga 89'	Report		Stadium: WallSport-Areena; Attendance: 402; Referee: Olli-Jussi Sariola

4 February 2017 2	FF Jaro	2 – 1	SJK	Jakobstad
17:15 EET (UTC+2)	Vidjeskog 6' (yellow card) 44'; Häggblom 8'; K.Peth (yellow card) 49'	Report	M'Boma (yellow card) 23'; Laaksonen (yellow card) 41'; Klinga (yellow card) 57'; Hetemaj 83' (pen.)	Stadium: Tellushallen; Attendance: 601; Referee: Toni Pohjoismäki

11 February 2017 3	SJK	6 – 1	MuSa	Seinäjoki
14:15 EET (UTC+2)	Vales 37'; Laaksonen (yellow card) 41'; Hetemaj 45' (pen.); Klinga 50'; M'Boma 56'; Ahde 73'; Sarajärvi 83'	Report	Räisänen 31'; J.Välilä (yellow card) 44'; Velija (yellow card) 51'; M.Sallila (yellow card) 74'	Stadium: WallSport-Areena; Attendance: 278; Referee: Atte Jussila

18 February 2017 4	Jazz	0 – 6	SJK	Pori
18:30 EET (UTC+2)		Report	Laaksonen 33', 68'; Meura 45+1', 85' (o.g.); Ions 54'; Ahde 78'	Stadium: Karhuhalli; Attendance: 237; Referee: Jesse Kananen

1 March 2017 5	SJK	0 – 3	VPS	Seinäjoki
19:00 EET (UTC+2)	Ions (yellow card) 9'; Hetemaj (yellow card) 11'	Report	Vahtera 16' (pen.); Morrissey 22', 38'	Stadium: WallSport-Areena; Attendance: 498; Referee: Kalle Mäkinen

==== Knockout stage ====
13 March 2017 Quarterfinal Play-offs	RoPS	0 – 2	SJK	Kemi
20:00 EET (UTC+2)		Report	Klinga 6' (yellow card) 75'; Guichón 57'	Stadium: Junkohalli TN; Attendance: 174; Referee: Toni Pohjoismäki

18 March 2017 Quarterfinal	SJK	3 – 2 (a.e.t.)	Inter Turku	Seinäjoki
18:00 EET (UTC+2)	Hetemaj (yellow card) 20'; Ions 37'; M'Boma 70' (yellow card) 90+1'; Guichón (yellow card) 74' (goal) 81'; Aksalu (yellow card) 90+3'	Report	Henrique 51' (yellow card) 90+1'; Lehtonen (yellow card) 57'; Furuholm 66'; Mäkitalo (yellow card) 82'; Markkula (yellow card) 82'	Stadium: OmaSp Stadion; Attendance: 1,569; Referee: Ville Nevalainen

1 April 2017 Semifinal	Honka	1 – 1 (a.e.t.) (4 – 5 p)	SJK	Espoo
14:30 EEST (UTC+3)	T.Saarinen (yellow card) 29'; Liikonen 39'; J.Silva (yellow card) 105+15'	Report	Hetemaj 29' (pen.); Hatakka (yellow card) 43'; Tahvanainen (yellow card) 61'; Bardanca (yellow card) 105+11'	Stadium: Tapiola 1 TN; Attendance: 687; Referee: Mikko Mörö
	Penalties
	Tammilehto (penalty missed); Rasimus (penalty scored); Perovuo (penalty scored); Puuskari (penalty scored); Äijälä (penalty scored)		Guichón (penalty scored); Laaksonen (penalty scored); Ions (penalty scored); Klinga (penalty scored); Hetemaj (penalty scored)

23 September 2017 Final	SJK	0 – 1	HJK	Seinäjoki
17:00 EEST (UTC+3)	Dorman (yellow card) 45'; Malolo (yellow card) 50' (yellow-red card) 79'; Hatakka (yellow card) 83'	Report	V.Vesiaho (yellow card) 28'; Pelvas 77'; Annan (yellow card) 90'; Tanaka (yellow card) 90+3'	Stadium: OmaSP Stadion; Attendance: 3,617; Referee: Marko Grönholm

=== UEFA Europa League ===
==== Qualifying rounds ====
29 June 2017 First qualifying round 1st leg	KR (Iceland)	0 – 0	(Finland) SJK	Reykjavík, Iceland
22:15 EEST (UTC+3)	Ó.Ö.Hauksson (yellow card) 73'	Report	Hetemaj (yellow card) 44'; Hatakka (yellow card) 59'; Hurme (yellow card) 85'	Stadium: KR-völlur; Attendance: 531; Referee: Zbyněk Proske (Czech Republic)

6 July 2017 First qualifying round 2ndleg	SJK (Finland)	0 – 2 (0 – 2 agg.)	(Iceland) KR	Seinäjoki, Finland
19:00 EEST (UTC+3)	Hetemaj (yellow card) 84'	Report	S.J.Friðgeirsson (yellow card) 45+1'; Pálmason 51'; Chopart (yellow card) 64'; Thomsen 83'	Stadium: OmaSP Stadion; Referee: Irfan Peljto (Bosnia and Herzegovina)

== Squad statistics ==
As of match played 28 October 2017

=== Appearances and goals ===
No.	Pos	Nat	Player	Total		Veikkausliiga		Finnish Cup		Europa League	
No.	Pos	Nat	Player	Apps	Goals	Apps	Goals	Apps	Goals	Apps	Goals
2	DF	(Finland) FIN	Joel Mero	12	2	11	2	1	0	0	0
3	DF	(Andorra) AND	Marc Vales	30	1	16+3	0	8+1	1	2	0
4	DF	(Wales) WAL	Richie Dorman	20	0	12	0	7+1	0	0	0
5	DF	(Finland) FIN	Dani Hatakka	29	2	23+1	2	2+1	0	2	0
6	MF	(Finland) FIN	Matej Hradecky	4	0	0+1	0	3	0	0	0
7	DF	(Finland) FIN	Timo Tahvanainen	29	0	16+3	0	7+1	0	2	0
8	MF	(Finland) FIN	Johannes Laaksonen	35	3	20+5	1	8	2	2	0
9	FW	(Spain) ESP	Sergi Arimany	7	1	3+4	1	0	0	0	0
10	FW	(England) ENG	Billy Ions	39	14	26+3	12	8	2	2	0
11	MF	(Finland) FIN	Tomas Hradecký	30	2	12+9	2	5+2	0	2	0
14	FW	(England) ENG	Kaine Sheppard	7	0	5+2	0	0	0	0	0
15	MF	(Finland) FIN	Matti Klinga	41	3	28+2	0	8+1	3	1+1	0
16	DF	(Finland) FIN	Joonas Sundman	10	0	7+3	0	0	0	0	0
17	MF	(Finland) FIN	Ville Tikkanen	2	0	0	0	1+1	0	0	0
18	DF	(Finland) FIN	Jarkko Hurme	27	1	21+3	1	1	0	2	0
19	MF	(Finland) FIN	Obed Malolo	24	1	15+6	1	1	0	0+2	0
20	DF	(Finland) FIN	Arttu Aromaa	1	0	0	0	0+1	0	0	0
22	DF	(Spain) ESP	Diego Bardanca	25	0	18+5	0	2	0	0	0
26	MF	(Finland) FIN	Jesse Sarajärvi	20	4	7+10	3	0+2	1	0+1	0
29	DF	(Spain) ESP	Chema Antón	12	0	11+1	0	0	0	0	0
31	GK	(Finland) FIN	Paavo Valakari	4	0	1	0	3	0	0	0
33	GK	(Estonia) EST	Mihkel Aksalu	40	0	32	0	6	0	2	0
37	FW	(Democratic Republic of the Congo) COD	Aristote M'Boma	32	8	17+5	6	9	2	0+1	0
42	MF	(Finland) FIN	Emil Lidman	1	0	0	0	0+1	0	0	0
58	MF	(Kosovo) KOS	Mehmet Hetemaj	32	8	22	2	8	6	2	0
60	MF	(Finland) FIN	Aatu Kujanpää	1	0	0+1	0	0	0	0	0
80	MF	(Finland) FIN	Erfan Zeneli	33	4	25+5	4	1	0	1+1	0
99	FW	(Finland) FIN	Vahid Hambo	7	1	2+5	1	0	0	0	0
Players from Kerho 07 who appeared:
16	MF	(Finland) FIN	Onni Valakari	4	0	0	0	4	0	0	0
25	FW	(Finland) FIN	Elias Ahde	12	4	3+3	0	1+4	4	1	0
Players away from the club on loan:
Players who left SJK during the season:
3	DF	(Finland) FIN	Juhani Ojala	2	1	0	0	1+1	1	0	0
9	FW	(Cameroon) CMR	Anatole Abang	6	0	2+4	0	0	0	0	0
17	DF	(Slovenia) SLO	Denis Kramar	1	0	0	0	1	0	0	0
21	MF	(Uruguay) URU	Facundo Guichón	17	4	8+5	2	3	2	1	0

=== Goal scorers ===
Place	Position	Nation	Number	Name	Veikkausliiga	Finnish Cup	Europa League	Total
1	FW	(England)	10	Billy Ions	12	2	0	14
2	FW	(Democratic Republic of the Congo)	37	Aristote M'Boma	6	2	0	8
2	MF	(Kosovo)	58	Mehmet Hetemaj	2	6	0	8
4	MF	(Finland)	80	Erfan Zeneli	4	0	0	4
4	MF	(Finland)	26	Jesse Sarajärvi	3	1	0	4
4	MF	(Uruguay)	21	Facundo Guichón	2	2	0	4
4	FW	(Finland)	25	Elias Ahde	0	4	0	4
4				Own goal	2	2	0	4
9	MF	(Finland)	8	Johannes Laaksonen	1	2	0	3
9	MF	(Finland)	15	Matti Klinga	0	3	0	3
11	MF	(Finland)	11	Tomas Hradecký	2	0	0	2
11	DF	(Finland)	5	Dani Hatakka	2	0	0	2
11	DF	(Finland)	2	Joel Mero	2	0	0	2
14	FW	(Spain)	9	Sergi Arimany	1	0	0	1
14	MF	(Finland)	19	Obed Malolo	1	0	0	1
14	FW	(Finland)	99	Vahid Hambo	1	0	0	1
14	DF	(Finland)	18	Jarkko Hurme	1	0	0	1
14	DF	(Finland)	3	Juhani Ojala	0	1	0	1
14	DF	(Andorra)	3	Marc Vales	0	1	0	1
TOTALS					42	26	0	68

=== Clean sheets ===
Place	Position	Nation	Number	Name	Veikkausliiga	Finnish Cup	Europa League	Total
1	GK	(Estonia)	33	Mihkel Aksalu	12	1	1	14
2	GK	(Finland)	31	Paavo Valakari	0	2	0	2
TOTALS					12	3	1	16

=== Disciplinary record ===
Number	Nation	Position	Name	Veikkausliiga		Finnish Cup		Europa League		Total	
Number	Nation	Position	Name	Yellow card	Red card	Yellow card	Red card	Yellow card	Red card	Yellow card	Red card
2	(Finland)	DF	Joel Mero	0	1	0	0	0	0	0	1
3	(Andorra)	DF	Marc Vales	4	0	0	0	0	0	4	0
4	(Wales)	DF	Richie Dorman	3	0	1	0	0	0	4	0
5	(Finland)	DF	Dani Hatakka	6	0	2	0	1	0	9	0
7	(Finland)	DF	Timo Tahvanainen	3	0	1	0	0	0	4	0
8	(Finland)	MF	Johannes Laaksonen	4	0	2	0	0	0	6	0
10	(England)	FW	Billy Ions	3	0	1	0	0	0	4	0
11	(Finland)	MF	Tomas Hradecký	3	0	0	0	0	0	3	0
15	(Finland)	MF	Matti Klinga	3	0	2	0	0	0	5	0
16	(Finland)	DF	Joonas Sundman	5	0	0	0	0	0	5	0
18	(Finland)	DF	Jarkko Hurme	5	0	0	0	1	0	6	0
19	(Finland)	MF	Obed Malolo	3	0	2	1	0	0	5	1
22	(Spain)	DF	Diego Bardanca	5	0	1	0	0	0	6	0
33	(Estonia)	GK	Mihkel Aksalu	4	0	1	0	0	0	5	0
37	(Democratic Republic of the Congo)	FW	Aristote M'Boma	2	0	2	0	0	0	4	0
58	(Kosovo)	MF	Mehmet Hetemaj	8	0	2	0	2	0	12	0
80	(Finland)	MF	Erfan Zeneli	3	0	0	0	0	0	3	0
99	(Finland)	FW	Vahid Hambo	2	0	0	0	0	0	2	0
Players who left SJK during the season:
9	(Cameroon)	FW	Anatole Abang	4	0	0	0	0	0	4	0
21	(Uruguay)	MF	Facundo Guichón	5	0	1	0	0	0	6	0
TOTALS				75	1	18	1	4	0	97	2
