= List of Finnish football transfers summer 2016 =

This is a list of Finnish football transfers for the 2016 summer transfer window. Only moves featuring 2016 Veikkausliiga are listed.

== Veikkausliiga ==
=== FC Inter ===
In:

No.	Pos.	Nation	Player
6	DF	GRE	Petros Kanakoudis
8	MF	GER	Bajram Nebihi (from (Germany) Stuttgarter Kickers)
17	MF	FIN	Erfan Zeneli (from (Kazakhstan) Shakhter Karagandy)
22	MF	ARG	Lucas García (from (Finland) PK-35 Vantaa)
99	FW	FIN	Njazi Kuqi (from (Finland) PK-35 Vantaa)

Out:

No.	Pos.	Nation	Player

=== FC Lahti ===
In:

No.	Pos.	Nation	Player
—	GK	RUS	Aleksandr Vasyutin (loan from (Russia) Zenit St.Petersburg)
—	MF	RUS	Pavel Osipov (loan from (Russia) Zenit St.Petersburg)

Out:

No.	Pos.	Nation	Player

=== HIFK ===
In:

No.	Pos.	Nation	Player

Out:

No.	Pos.	Nation	Player

=== HJK ===
In:

No.	Pos.	Nation	Player
8	DF	BRA	Rafinha (from (Belgium) Gent)
17	FW	GAM	Ousman Jallow (from (Kazakhstan) Irtysh Pavlodar)
18	DF	FIN	Roni Peiponen (loan from (Norway) Molde)
31	FW	FIN	Akseli Pelvas (from (Sweden) Falkenbergs FF)
77	FW	GHA	Evans Mensah (on loan from (Ghana) Inter Allies)

Out:

No.	Pos.	Nation	Player
4	MF	SLE	Medo (to Kuwait SC)
31	DF	FIN	Leo Väisänen (on loan to (Finland) PK-35 Vantaa)
35	DF	FIN	Lassi Järvenpää (loan to (Finland) RoPS)
43	FW	GHA	Richard Gadze (loan return to (India) Delhi Dynamos)

=== IFK Mariehamn ===
In:

No.	Pos.	Nation	Player

Out:

No.	Pos.	Nation	Player

=== Ilves ===
In:

No.	Pos.	Nation	Player
13	FW	UGA	Yunus Sentamu (from (Tunisia) Sfaxien)
30	FW	SEN	Yoro Ly (from (Portugal) Boavista)

Out:

No.	Pos.	Nation	Player

=== KuPS ===
In:

No.	Pos.	Nation	Player
22	FW	SRB	Saša Jovović (from (Finland) Ekenäs)

Out:

No.	Pos.	Nation	Player

=== PK-35 Vantaa ===
In:

No.	Pos.	Nation	Player
6	DF	NGA	Ojembe Olatuga
—	DF	FIN	Leo Väisänen (on loan from (Finland) HJK)

Out:

No.	Pos.	Nation	Player
11	MF	FIN	Ilari Äijälä (to (Finland) Honka)
15	MF	BRA	Lucas Kaufmann (to (Finland) Ekenäs)
19	FW	FIN	Aleksi Ristola (to (Finland) HIFK)
21	DF	FIN	Nosh A Lody (to (Finland) Honka)
22	MF	ARG	Lucas García (to (Finland) Inter Turku)
99	FW	FIN	Njazi Kuqi (to (Finland) Inter Turku)

=== PS Kemi ===
In:

No.	Pos.	Nation	Player
4	FW	SVN	Filip Valenčič (from (England) Notts County)
7	FW	TRI	Rundell Winchester (trial from (Trinidad and Tobago) Central)
7	FW	SWE	Erik Törnros (loan from (Sweden) Dalkurd)
35	GK	FIN	Mikko Vilmunen
—	FW	CMR	Christian Pouga (from (Portugal) Boavista)

Out:

No.	Pos.	Nation	Player
7	FW	TRI	Rundell Winchester
9	FW	ENG	Billy Ions (loan to (Finland) SJK)
10	FW	GNB	Kaby (to (England) Crawley Town)
99	DF	BRA	Muller Pereira Roque
—	FW	CMR	Christian Pouga

=== RoPS ===
In:

No.	Pos.	Nation	Player
13	DF	FIN	Lassi Järvenpää (loan from (Finland) HJK)
77	MF	ESP	José Galán (from (Indonesia) Persela Lamongan)
99	FW	EST	Albert Prosa (to (Estonia) Flora)

Out:

No.	Pos.	Nation	Player
11	FW	FIN	Aleksandr Kokko (to (Australia) Newcastle Jets)

=== SJK ===
In:

No.	Pos.	Nation	Player
3	DF	NGA	Abonima Izuegbu
3	DF	FIN	Juhani Ojala (from (Russia) Terek Grozny)
10	FW	ENG	Billy Ions (loan from (Finland) PS Kemi)
21	DF	AND	Marc Vales (from (Spain) L'Hospitalet)
24	DF	ESP	Aimar (from (Spain) Llagostera)

Out:

No.	Pos.	Nation	Player
3	DF	NGA	Abonima Izuegbu
10	MF	FIN	Alexei Eremenko
16	FW	EST	Tarmo Kink (to (Hungary) Mezőkövesd-Zsóry)
26	MF	FIN	Jesse Sarajärvi (loan to (Finland) Haka)
35	DF	CIV	Abdoulaye Méïté

=== VPS ===
In:

No.	Pos.	Nation	Player

Out:

No.	Pos.	Nation	Player
