= Hradecký =

Hradecký (feminine Hradecká) is a surname. Notable people with the surname include:

- Ambrož Hradecký, Czech priest
- Lukáš Hrádecký, Slovak-Finnish footballer
- Matej Hradecky, Slovak-Finnish footballer
- Tomas Hradecký, Slovak-Finnish footballer
- Lucie Hradecká, Czech tennis player

== See also ==
- Hradecky Bridge, Bridge in Slovenia
