= Valakari =

Valakari is a Finnish surname. Notable people with the surname include:

- Onni Valakari (born 1999), Finnish footballer
- Paavo Valakari (born 1997), Finnish footballer
- Simo Valakari (born 1973), Finnish football manager and player, father of Onni and Paavo
