= Sarajärvi =

Sarajärvi is a Finnish surname. Notable people with the surname include:

- Jani Sarajärvi (born 1979), Finnish footballer and manager
- Jesse Sarajärvi (born 1995), Finnish footballer
