= Lucas García =

Argentine footballer

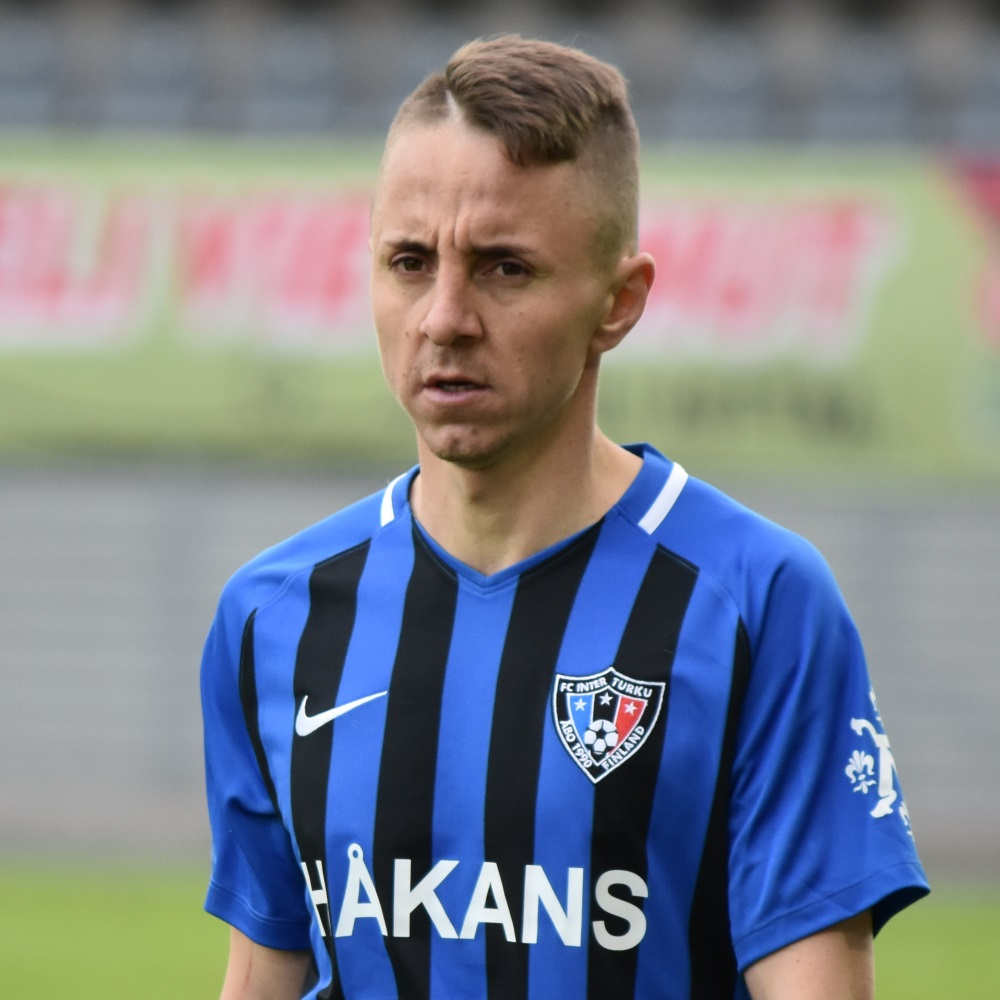

Personal information
- Full name: Lucas Gabriel López García
- Date of birth: 13 January 1988 (age 38)
- Place of birth: 25 de Mayo, Misiones, Argentina
- Height: 1.68 m (5 ft 6 in)
- Positions: Attacking midfielder; second striker

Team information
- Current team: Iraklis Larissa
- Number: 11

Youth career
- 1998–2003: San Martín de Tucumán
- 2003–2008: Guaraní Antonio Franco

Senior career*
Years	Team	Apps	(Gls)
2008–2011	Guaraní Antonio Franco	70	(8)
2011–2014	Ceahlăul Piatra Neamţ	31	(1)
2014	FC Honka	3	(0)
2015–2016	PK-35 Vantaa	30	(4)
2016–2018	Inter Turku	35	(1)
2018–2019	Volos	24	(4)
2020–2022	Niki Volos	61	(9)
2022–2023	Apollon Larissa	4	(0)
2023–	Iraklis Larissa	10	(1)
Medal record
2016 – Declarado Ciudadano Ilustre de 25 de Mayo, Misiones, Argentina
- * Club domestic league appearances and goals as of 10 June 2023

Lucas Gabriel López García (born 13 January 1988) is an Argentine professional footballer who plays as an attacking midfielder for Greek Super League 2 club Iraklis Larissa.

His first match as a professional football player and his first match in Liga I was played for Ceahlăul Piatra Neamţ against Sportul Studențesc București.

== Career ==
=== Ceahlaul ===
At Ceahlăul he was nicknamed "Messi in Ceahlaul" and the press rumored that Steaua București was interested to transfer him.

=== Inter Turku ===
On 13 June 2016, García moved to Inter Turku on an 18-month contract.

== Honours ==
Inter Turku

- Finnish Cup: 2017–18

Volos

- Football League: 2018–19
