= Kaine Sheppard =

English footballer

Personal information
- Full name: Kaine Sheppard
- Date of birth: 26 November 1993 (age 32)
- Place of birth: Wellingborough, England
- Height: 1.90 m (6 ft 3 in)
- Position: Forward

Team information
- Current team: Manningham United Blues
- Number: 14

Youth career
- Leyton Orient

Senior career*
Years	Team	Apps	(Gls)
2010–2012	Leyton Orient	0	(0)
2011	→ St Albans City (loan)	1	(0)
2011	→ Histon (loan)	3	(0)
2012–2013	Braintree Town	24	(3)
2012	→ Histon (loan)	6	(1)
2013	→ Histon (loan)	9	(5)
2013–2014	Histon	30	(5)
2014–2016	Heidelberg United	49	(24)
2017	Avondale	16	(3)
2017	SJK	7	(0)
2018	Avondale	26	(20)
2018–2020	Newcastle Jets	28	(3)
2021	Western United	7	(0)
2022–2024	Heidelberg United	76	(32)
2025	Melbourne Knights	12	(1)
2025–	Manningham United Blues	9	(2)
- * Club domestic league appearances and goals as of 3 April 2026

Kaine Sheppard (born 26 November 1993) is an English professional footballer who plays as a forward for Manningham United Blues in VPL Men's 1.

== Career ==
On 19 July 2017, Sheppard signed for Finnish Veikkausliiga club SJK until the end of the 2017 season, with an option for the 2018 season.

After scoring 14 goals in 22 league games for Avondale, Sheppard joined A-League side Newcastle Jets on a one-year deal.

In February 2021, Sheppard joined Western United for the remainder of the 2020–21 A-League season.

In February 2022, Sheppard rejoined Heidelberg United for the season.

== Personal life ==
Sheppard holds Australian citizenship.
