= Billy Ions =

English footballer

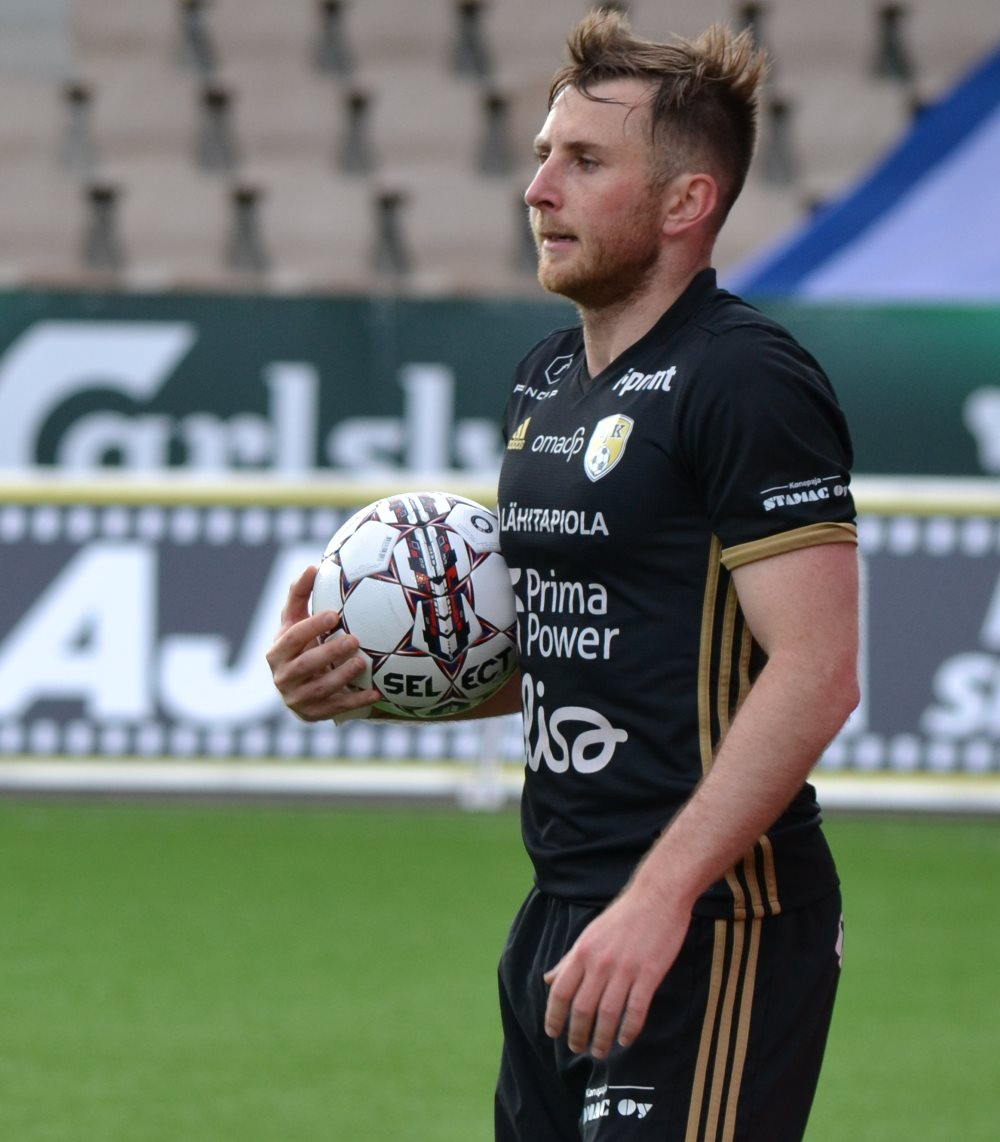

Personal information
- Full name: William Greenwell Ions
- Date of birth: 11 March 1994 (age 32)
- Place of birth: Ashington, England
- Height: 1.82 m (6 ft 0 in)
- Position: Forward

Youth career
- 2009–2010: Tenerife
- 2010–2012: Newcastle United
- 2012−2013: Leeds United

Senior career*
Years	Team	Apps	(Gls)
2013	PS Kemi	22	(9)
2013	West Auckland Town	1	(0)
2013–2014	Newcastle Benfield	4	(0)
2014–2016	PS Kemi	89	(46)
2016	→ SJK (loan)	10	(5)
2017–2020	SJK	64	(14)
2020	SJK Akatemia	3	(0)
Total		193	(74)
- * Club domestic league appearances and goals

William Greenwell Ions (born 11 March 1994) is an English former professional footballer who played as a forward. He played youth football with CD Tenerife, Newcastle United, and Leeds United. After being released by Leeds United, Ions joined the Nike Academy. He started his professional career with PS Kemi.

== Early life ==
Ions, born in Ashington, Northumberland, moved to the Canary Islands in Spain with his family at a young age. While in Spain, he idolised England national team star Wayne Rooney and Spanish forward Fernando Torres to whom he compared himself to.

== Career ==
=== Early career ===
Ions first started playing football in the youth team of the local village of Valle de San Lorenzo in Tenerife, named "Constanza". Years later he started to play in the football school of Juan Miguel.

=== Tenerife ===
At the age of 15, Ions joined the youth setup at CD Tenerife.

=== Newcastle United ===
In February 2010, he returned to England to join Newcastle United, the club he supported as a child. He made his Under-18's debut in a home match against Nottingham Forest.

=== Leeds United ===
Ions left on a free transfer to Leeds United in September 2012. While at Leeds, he played for the under-18 side. He started in a match against Sunderland and scored a goal.

=== Nike Academy ===
Without a club, Ions joined the Nike Academy. During his time there he was mostly injured. While at the Nike Academy, he played in a friendly match against PS Kemi Kings whose attention he attracted after a good performance.

=== Palloseura Kemi Kings ===
Ions joined PS Kemi Kings after his impressive performance against them in a friendly match with the Nike Academy. His manager after signing was fellow Englishman and former West Ham United defender Tommy Taylor. For most of his time at the club he has played on the left wing. In his second season at the club Ions helped PS Kemi reach promotion for the first time since 2011. In the 2015 season he had another successful year, gaining back to back to promotions with the club reaching the top division. Ions was voted best player of the league by other players at the end of the season.

=== Seinäjoen Jalkapallokerho ===
On 11 August 2016, Ions agreed to move on loan to SJK for the remainder of the 2016, commencing on 21 August 2016. SJK also announced that Ions had agreed to join the club permanently upon the completion of the loan deal, for two-seasons.

== Career statistics ==
As of match played 28 October 2017

Appearances and goals by club, season and competition
Club	Season	League			National cup		League cup		Continental		Other		Total	
Club	Season	Division	Apps	Goals	Apps	Goals	Apps	Goals	Apps	Goals	Apps	Goals	Apps	Goals
PS Kemi	2013	Kakkonen	24	9	0	0	–		–		–		22	9
PS Kemi	2014	Kakkonen	28	13	2	0	–		–		–		28	13
PS Kemi	2015	Ykkönen	27	17	4	4	–		–		–		31	21
PS Kemi	2016	Veikkausliiga	21	8	2	3	5	1	–		–		28	12
PS Kemi	Total		100	47	8	7	5	1	0	0	0	0	113	55
SJK (loan)	2016	Veikkausliiga	10	5	0	0	0	0	–		–		10	5
SJK	2017	Veikkausliiga	29	12	8	2	2	0	–		–		39	14
Career total			139	64	16	9	7	1	0	0	0	0	162	74
