= Facundo Guichón =

Uruguayan footballer (born 1991)

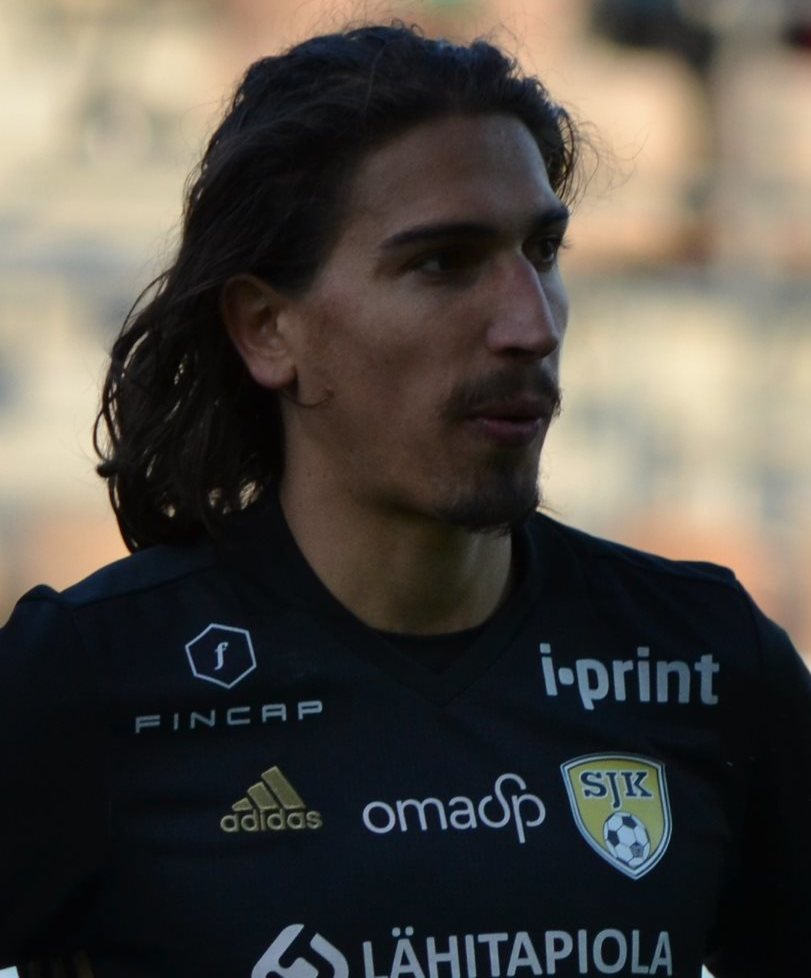
- Guichón with SJK in 2017

Personal information
- Full name: Facundo Jeremías Guichón Sisto
- Date of birth: 8 February 1991 (age 35)
- Place of birth: Florida, Uruguay
- Height: 1.82 m (5 ft 11 1/2 in)
- Position: Winger

Team information
- Current team: Cibao
- Number: 20

Youth career
- CA Avenida
- 2010–2011: Peñarol

Senior career*
Years	Team	Apps	(Gls)
2011–2014	Peñarol	6	(0)
2012–2013	→ Racing Montevideo (loan)	12	(1)
2013–2014	→ El Tanque Sisley (loan)	11	(2)
2014–2015	Alcorcón	32	(3)
2015–2016	Alavés	30	(1)
2016	UCAM Murcia	7	(0)
2017	SJK	13	(2)
2017	Llagostera	28	(0)
2018–2019	Independiente Santa Fe	20	(2)
2019	Rampla Juniors	5	(0)
2019–2020	Deportes Iquique	9	(0)
2020	Alki Oroklini	11	(3)
2021	9 de Octubre	3	(0)
2021	Guayaquil City	8	(0)
2022	Sud América	20	(1)
2023–	Cibao	25	(3)
- * Club domestic league appearances and goals as of 18:25, 13 February 2022 (UTC)

Facundo Jeremías Guichón Sisto (born 8 February 1991), is an Uruguayan footballer who plays as a left winger for Cibao in the Liga Dominicana de Fútbol.

== Club career ==
Born in Florida, Guichón graduated with Peñarol's youth setup, and was promoted to the main squad in 2010, aged 19. He made his first-team debut on 15 May 2011, replacing injured Jonathan Urretavizcaya in a 1–4 home loss against River Plate for the Uruguayan Primera División championship.

Guichón subsequently served loan stints at Racing Montevideo and El Tanque Sisley, appearing sparingly in both clubs. On 1 September 2014 he signed for Spanish Segunda División side AD Alcorcón.

On 7 July 2015 Guichón rescinded his contract with the Madrid outfit, and moved to fellow league team Deportivo Alavés six days later, after agreeing to a two-year deal. Mainly used as a substitute, he contributed with 30 appearances and one goals as his side returned to La Liga after a ten-year absence.

On 22 July 2016, Guichón signed a one-year contract with UCAM Murcia CF, still in the second division. On 21 December, after appearing rarely, he rescinded his contract.

Guichón left Seinäjoen Jalkapallokerho by mutual consent in July 2017.

Guichón is currently playing for Colombian club Independiente Santa Fe since the start of the 2018-II season with 2 goals so far.

== Career statistics ==
As of 23 October 2024.

Appearances and goals by club, season and competition
Club	Season	League			Cup (Note: Includes Copa del Rey, Copa Catalunya, Suomen Cup, Copa Colombia and Copa Uruguay)		Continental		Total	
Club	Season	Division	Apps	Goals	Apps	Goals	Apps	Goals	Apps	Goals
Peñarol	2010–11	Uruguayan Primera División	4	0	–		0	0	4	0
Peñarol	2011–12	Uruguayan Primera División	2	0	–		2 (Note: Appearances in Copa Libertadores)	0	4	0
Peñarol	Total		6	0	0	0	2	0	8	0
Racing Montevideo (loan)	2012–13	Uruguayn Primera División	12	1	–		–		12	1
El Tanque Sisley (loan)	2013–14	Uruguayan Primera División	11	2	–		–		11	2
Alcorcón	2014–15	Segunda División	32	3	1	0	–		33	3
Alavés	2015–16	Segunda División	30	1	1	0	–		31	1
UCAM Murcia	2016–17	Segunda División	5	0	1	0	-		6	0
SJK Seinäjoki	2017	Veikkausliiga	13	2	3	2	1 (Note: Appearance(s) in UEFA Europa League)	0	17	4
Llagostera	2017–18	Segunda División B	28	0	3	0	–		31	0
Independiente Santa Fe	2018	Categoría Primera A	16	2	3	0	5 (Note: Appearances in Copa Sudamericana)	0	24	2
Independiente Santa Fe	2019	Categoría Primera A	4	0	2	0	–		6	0
Independiente Santa Fe	Total		20	2	5	0	5	0	30	2
Rampla Juniors	2019	Uruguayan Primera División	5	0	–		–		5	0
Deportes Iquique	2019	Chilean Primera División	7	0	–		–		7	0
Deportes Iquique	2020	Chilean Primera División	2	0	–		–		2	0
Deportes Iquique	Total		9	0	0	0	0	0	9	0
Alki Oroklini	2020–21	Cypriot Second Division	11	3	–		–		11	3
9 de Octubre	2021	Ecuadorian Serie A	3	0	–		–		3	0
Guayaquil City	2021	Ecuadorian Serie A	8	0	–		–		8	0
Sud América	2022	Uruguayan Segunda División	20	1	1	0	–		21	1
Cibao	2023	Liga Dominicana de Fútbol	25	3	0	0	3 (Note: Appearances in CONCACAF Caribbean Cup)	1	28	4
Career total			238	18	15	2	11	1	264	21

== Honours ==
Peñarol

- Uruguayan Primera División: 2012–13

Alavés

- Segunda División: 2015–16
