= Veinticinco de Mayo, Misiones =

Veinticinco de Mayo (Misiones)
- Municipality and village
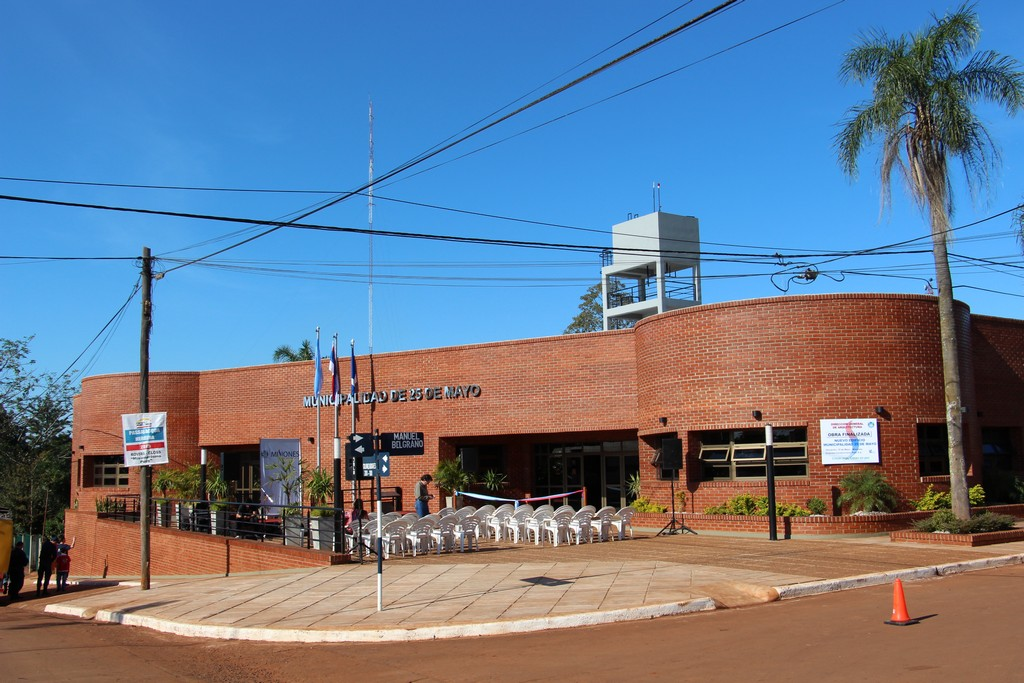

- Location within Misiones Province Location within Argentina
- Country: Argentina
- Province: Misiones Province
- Time zone: UTC−3 (ART)

Veinticinco de Mayo (Misiones) is a village and municipality in Misiones Province in north-eastern Argentina.
