= Samu Nieminen =

Finnish footballer (born 1992)

Personal information
- Date of birth: 14 January 1992 (age 34)
- Place of birth: Jyväskylä, Finland
- Height: 1.85 m (6 ft 1 in)
- Position: Centre back

Youth career
- 1999–2005: HuKi
- 2005–2008: JJK

Senior career*
Years	Team	Apps	(Gls)
2009–2013	JJK	55	(1)
2009–2010	→ Blackbird (loan)	8	(2)
2014	Kruoja	25	(2)
2015–2016	Ilves	26	(1)
2016	→ JJK (loan)	3	(0)
2017	JJK	25	(1)

International career
2008	Finland U16	15	(0)
2009	Finland U17	13	(0)
2010	Finland U18	8	(3)
2010–2011	Finland U19	5	(0)
2012	Finland U20	1	(0)
2012−2013	Finland U21	4	(0)
- * Club domestic league appearances and goals as of 3 April 2018

Samu Nieminen (born 14 January 1992) is a Finnish former footballer. He played as a central defender.

Nieminen started playing football at the age of seven in Huhtasuon Kisa. He moved to JJK in 2006. Nieminen signed a first team contract with the JJK in 2009 and made his Veikkausliiga debut on 9 May 2010 against MyPa. In 2012 Nieminen made a breakthrough and was 20 times in starting lineup. He continued as a starting lineup player in next season but the season was disappointment when JJK was last in league. In 2014 Nieminen signed a contract with FK Kruoja and won the silver medal. In 2015 Nieminen signed a two-year contract with Ilves.

On 15 August 2016, he returned to JJK on loan for the remainder of the 2016 season.

== International career ==
Nieminen has played four matches in Finland U21 and 42 matches in Finland junior national teams. Nieminen has been a captain of Finland junior national teams.

== Career statistics ==
As of 1 September 2024.

Appearances and goals by club, season and competition
Club	Season	League			Cup (Note: Includes Suomen Cup)		League cup (Note: Includes Finnish League Cup)		Europe		Total	
Club	Season	Division	Apps	Goals	Apps	Goals	Apps	Goals	Apps	Goals	Apps	Goals
JJK	2009	Veikkausliiga	0	0	0	0	1	0	–		1	0
JJK	2010	Veikkausliiga	11	0	0	0	1	0	–		12	0
JJK	2011	Veikkausliiga	0	0	1	0	0	0	–		1	0
JJK	2012	Veikkausliiga	21	1	2	0	5	0	0	0	28	1
JJK	2013	Veikkausliiga	23	0	3	0	3	0	–		29	0
JJK	Total		55	1	6	0	10	0	0	0	71	1
Blackbird (loan)	2009	Kakkonen	8	2	–		–		–		8	2
Kruoja	2014	A Lyga	25	2	–		–		–		25	2
Ilves	2015	Veikkausliiga	24	1	1	0	5	0	–		30	1
Ilves	2016	Veikkausliiga	2	0	0	0	4	0	–		6	0
Ilves	Total		26	1	1	0	9	0	0	0	36	1
Ilves II	2016	Kolmonen	3	1	–		–		–		3	1
JJK (loan)	2016	Ykkönen	3	0	–		–		–		3	0
JJK	2017	Veikkausliiga	25	1	2	0	–		–		27	1
Career total			145	8	9	0	19	0	0	0	173	8

== Honours ==
JJK

- Ykkönen: 2016
- Finnish League Cup runner-up: 2013

Kruoja

- A Lyga runner-up: 2014
