= Onni Valakari =

Finnish footballer (born 1999)

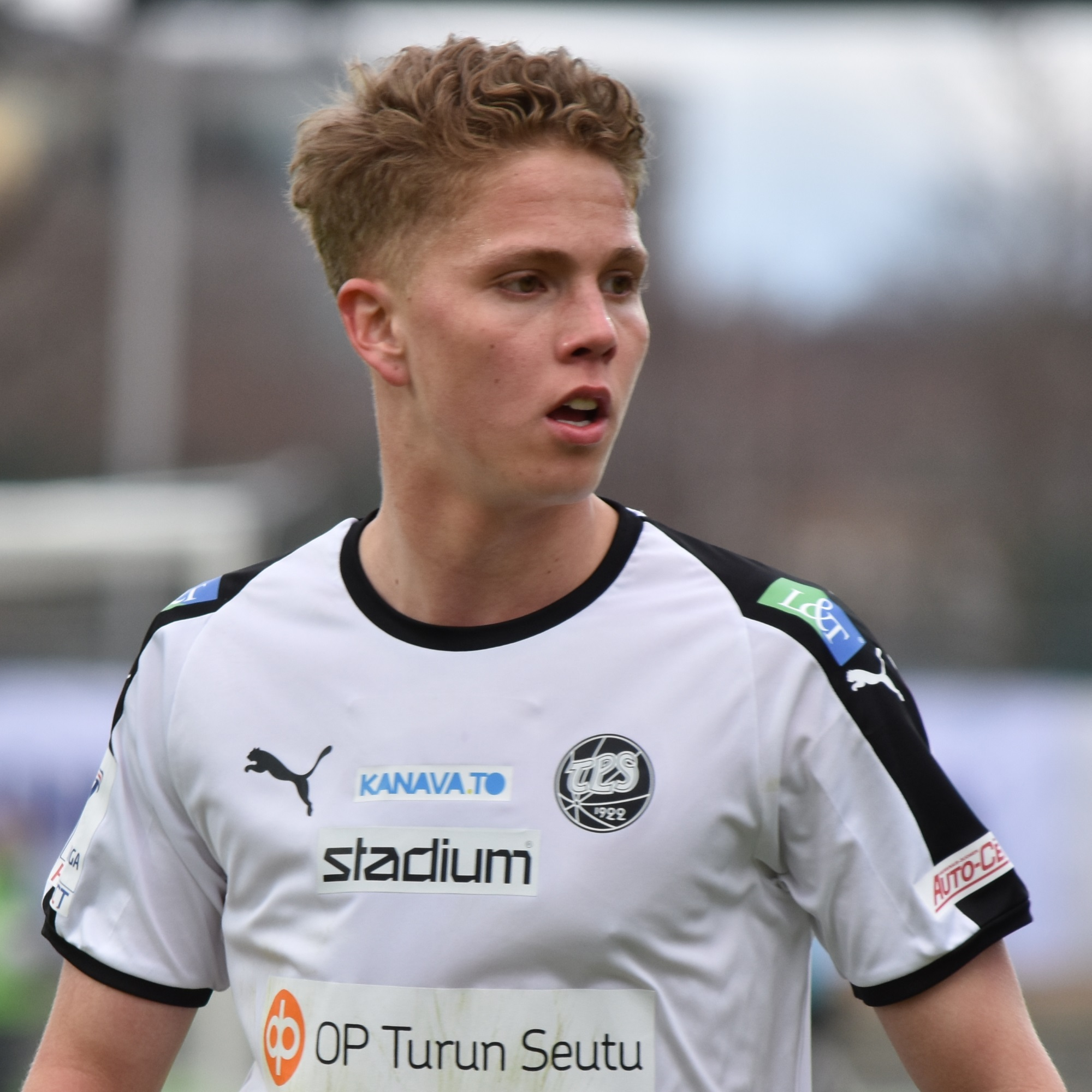
- Valakari with TPS in 2018

Personal information
- Full name: Onni Johannes Simonpoika Valakari
- Date of birth: 18 August 1999 (age 27)
- Place of birth: Motherwell, Scotland
- Height: 1.87 m (6 ft 2 in)
- Position: Attacking midfielder

Team information
- Current team: San Diego FC
- Number: 8

Youth career
- 2007–2013: KäPa
- 2013–2016: SJK

Senior career*
| Years | Team | Apps | (Gls) |
| 2015–2017 | SJK II | 10 | (5) |
| 2017–2018 | TPS | 29 | (10) |
| 2017 | → SalPa (loan) | 2 | (0) |
| 2018–2019 | Tromsø | 42 | (9) |
| 2020–2026 | Pafos | 136 | (40) |
| 2024 | → AIK (loan) | 10 | (2) |
| 2025 | → San Diego FC (loan) | 34 | (4) |
| 2026– | San Diego FC | 5 | (3) |

International career^{‡}
- Finland U18
| 2017 | Finland U19 | 1 | (0) |
| 2019–2020 | Finland U21 | 13 | (4) |
| 2020– | Finland | 19 | (1) |
- * Club domestic league appearances and goals as of 23 March 2026 ‡ National team caps and goals as of 15 November 2026

Onni Johannes Simonpoika Valakari (born 18 August 1999) is a Finnish professional footballer who plays as an attacking midfielder for Major League Soccer club San Diego FC and the Finland national team.

== Club career ==
Valakari started to play football in the youth sector of Käpylän Pallo (KäPa) in 2007. In 2013, he moved to Seinäjoki with his family and joined local club Seinäjoen Jalkapallokerho (SJK). After making his senior debut with the club's reserve team SJK II in a then third-tier level Kakkonen in 2015, Valakari continued his career with Turun Palloseura (TPS). He played with TPS first in the second-tier Ykkönen in 2017, and in the next 2018 season he debuted in the premier division Veikkausliiga. During the first half of the season, he scored four goals in the league.

On 5 August 2018, Valakari signed with the Norwegian club Tromsø, after his father was named the manager of the club's first team. The initial transfer fee was estimated to be around 200,000 NOK, with TPS securing a 15% sell-on clause.

In January 2020 he moved to Cypriot First Division club Pafos for an undisclosed fee, reported to be around €300,000. On 25 November 2022, Valakari extended his contract with Pafos until June 2026. On 18 May 2024, Valakari and Pafos won the 2023–24 Cypriot Cup title, after defeating Omonia 3–0 in the final.

On 26 August 2024, Valakari was loaned out to Swedish Allsvenskan club AIK for the rest of the 2024 season, with a purchase option of around €1 million. On 21 September, he scored his first goal in Allsvenskan, in a 1–0 away win against Kalmar FF. Following his loan, AIK were interested in signing Valakari on a permanent contract, but the clubs were unable to agree on the financial terms, and Valakari returned to Pafos.

In January 2025, Valakari extended his deal with Pafos until 2027, and subsequently signed a season-long loan deal with San Diego FC in MLS, for a €400,000 loan fee, with a purchase option of €1.5 million. After the season, the transfer was made permanent as San Diego picked up the purchase option.

== International career ==
He played for Finland at under-19 and under-21 levels.

Valakari made his senior international debut for Finland on 11 November 2020, scoring on his debut in a 2–0 victory over France. The other goalscorer was fellow debutant Marcus Forss.

Valakari was called up for the UEFA Euro 2020 pre-tournament friendly match against Sweden on 29 May 2021.

After a two-year absence from the national team, Valakari was named in the Finland squad for the 2024–25 UEFA Nations League B matches against Ireland and Greece in November 2024.

== Personal life ==
Valakari's father Simo is a former professional international player and a current manager; his older brother Paavo is a former professional player, and his younger brother Toivo is playing for Käpylän Pallo in Finnish second-tier. Onni was born in Scotland when his father had a stint as a player at Motherwell.

In May 2024, it was reported that Valakari had been sentenced to a €9,900 fine in Finnish Court of Kymenlaakso for not enrolling to the mandatory conscription service on time in January 2022. Valakari said that he had not received the letter from the Finnish Defence Forces when living in Cyprus, and in May 2025, it was announced that Valakari would start his military service in October.

In November 2024, in an interview to Helsingin Sanomat, Valakari sparked controversy with his positive comments on Andrew Tate and Donald Trump, implying also that the media has painted a false picture of them. Valakari stated that Trump's reelection was a positive thing for the US. He thinks the country and the world needs a strong leader such as Trump, who can bring back the stability to the world and restore the foreign relations.

== Career statistics ==
=== Club ===
As of 23 March 2026

Appearances and goals by club, season and competition
| Club | Season | League | | | National cup (Note: Includes Finnish Cup, Norwegian Cup and Cypriot Cup) | | Continental | | Other | | Total | |
| Club | Season | Division | Apps | Goals | Apps | Goals | Apps | Goals | Apps | Goals | Apps | Goals |
|---|---|---|---|---|---|---|---|---|---|---|---|---|
| SJK Akatemia | 2015 | Kakkonen | 2 | 0 | 0 | 0 | — | | — | | 2 | 0 |
| SJK Akatemia | 2016 | Kolmonen | 8 | 5 | — | | — | | 1 (Note: Appearance in UEFA Regions' Cup) | 0 | 9 | 5 |
| SJK Akatemia | 2017 | Kolmonen | 0 | 0 | 2 | 1 | — | | — | | 2 | 1 |
| SJK Akatemia | Total | | 10 | 5 | 2 | 1 | 0 | 0 | 1 | 0 | 13 | 6 |
| SJK | 2017 | Veikkausliiga | 0 | 0 | 4 | 0 | 0 | 0 | — | | 4 | 0 |
| TPS | 2017 | Ykkönen | 13 | 6 | 0 | 0 | — | | — | | 13 | 6 |
| TPS | 2018 | Veikkausliiga | 16 | 4 | 4 | 1 | — | | — | | 20 | 5 |
| TPS | Total | | 29 | 10 | 4 | 1 | — | | — | | 33 | 11 |
| SalPa (loan) | 2017 | Kakkonen | 2 | 0 | 0 | 0 | — | | — | | 2 | 0 |
| Tromsø | 2018 | Eliteserien | 13 | 2 | 0 | 0 | — | | — | | 13 | 2 |
| Tromsø | 2019 | Eliteserien | 29 | 7 | 3 | 0 | — | | — | | 32 | 7 |
| Tromsø | Total | | 42 | 9 | 3 | 0 | — | | — | | 45 | 9 |
| Pafos | 2019–20 | Cypriot First Division | 6 | 5 | — | | — | | — | | 6 | 5 |
| Pafos | 2020–21 | Cypriot First Division | 36 | 13 | 2 | 2 | — | | — | | 38 | 15 |
| Pafos | 2021–22 | Cypriot First Division | 26 | 10 | 2 | 1 | — | | — | | 28 | 11 |
| Pafos | 2022–23 | Cypriot First Division | 33 | 7 | 6 | 1 | — | | — | | 39 | 8 |
| Pafos | 2023–24 | Cypriot First Division | 35 | 5 | 5 | 2 | — | | — | | 40 | 7 |
| Pafos | 2024–25 | Cypriot First Division | 0 | 0 | 0 | 0 | 7 (Note: Two appearances in UEFA Europa League, five appearances in UEFA Conference League) | 0 | — | | 7 | 0 |
| Pafos | Total | | 136 | 40 | 15 | 6 | 7 | 0 | 0 | 0 | 158 | 46 |
| AIK (loan) | 2024 | Allsvenskan | 10 | 2 | 0 | 0 | – | | – | | 10 | 2 |
| San Diego FC (loan) | 2025 | MLS | 34 | 4 | 5 (Note: Appearances in MLS Cup Playoffs) | 1 | – | | 3 (Note: Appearances in Leagues Cup) | 2 | 42 | 7 |
| San Diego FC | 2026 | MLS | 5 | 3 | 0 | 0 | 3 (Note: Appearances in CONCACAF Champions Cup) | 0 | 0 | 0 | 8 | 3 |
| Career total | | | 268 | 73 | 33 | 9 | 10 | 0 | 4 | 2 | 315 | 84 |

=== International ===
As of match played on 15 November 2026

| National team | Year | Competitive | | Friendly | | Total | |
| National team | Year | Apps | Goals | Apps | Goals | Apps | Goals |
|---|---|---|---|---|---|---|---|
| Finland | 2020 | 1 (Note: Appearances in the 2020–21 UEFA Nations League B.) | 0 | 1 | 1 | 2 | 1 |
| Finland | 2021 | 5 (Note: Appearances in the 2022 FIFA World Cup qualification.) | 0 | 2 | 0 | 7 | 0 |
| Finland | 2022 | 2 (Note: Appearances in the 2022–23 UEFA Nations League B.) | 0 | 0 | 0 | 2 | 0 |
| Finland | 2023 | 0 | 0 | 0 | 0 | 0 | 0 |
| Finland | 2024 | 0 | 0 | 0 | 0 | 0 | 0 |
| Finland | 2025 | 1 (Note: Appearances in the 2026 FIFA World Cup qualification.) | 0 | 1 | 0 | 2 | 0 |
| Finland | 2026 | 4 (Note: Appearances in the 2026–27 UEFA Nations League C.) | 0 | 2 (Note: Includes two appearances in the 2026 FIFA Series.) | 0 | 6 | 0 |
| Total | | 13 | 0 | 6 | 0 | 19 | 1 |

Notes

As of match played on 7 June 2022. Scores and results list Finland's goal tally first.

| No | Date | Venue | Cap | Opponent | Score | Result | Competition |
|---|---|---|---|---|---|---|---|
| 1. | 11 November 2020 | Stade de France, Saint-Denis, France | 1 | France | 2–0 | 2–0 | Friendly |

== Honours ==
TPS

- Ykkönen: 2017

Pafos

- Cypriot Cup: 2023–24
