= OmaSP Stadion =

Football stadium in Seinäjoki, Finland

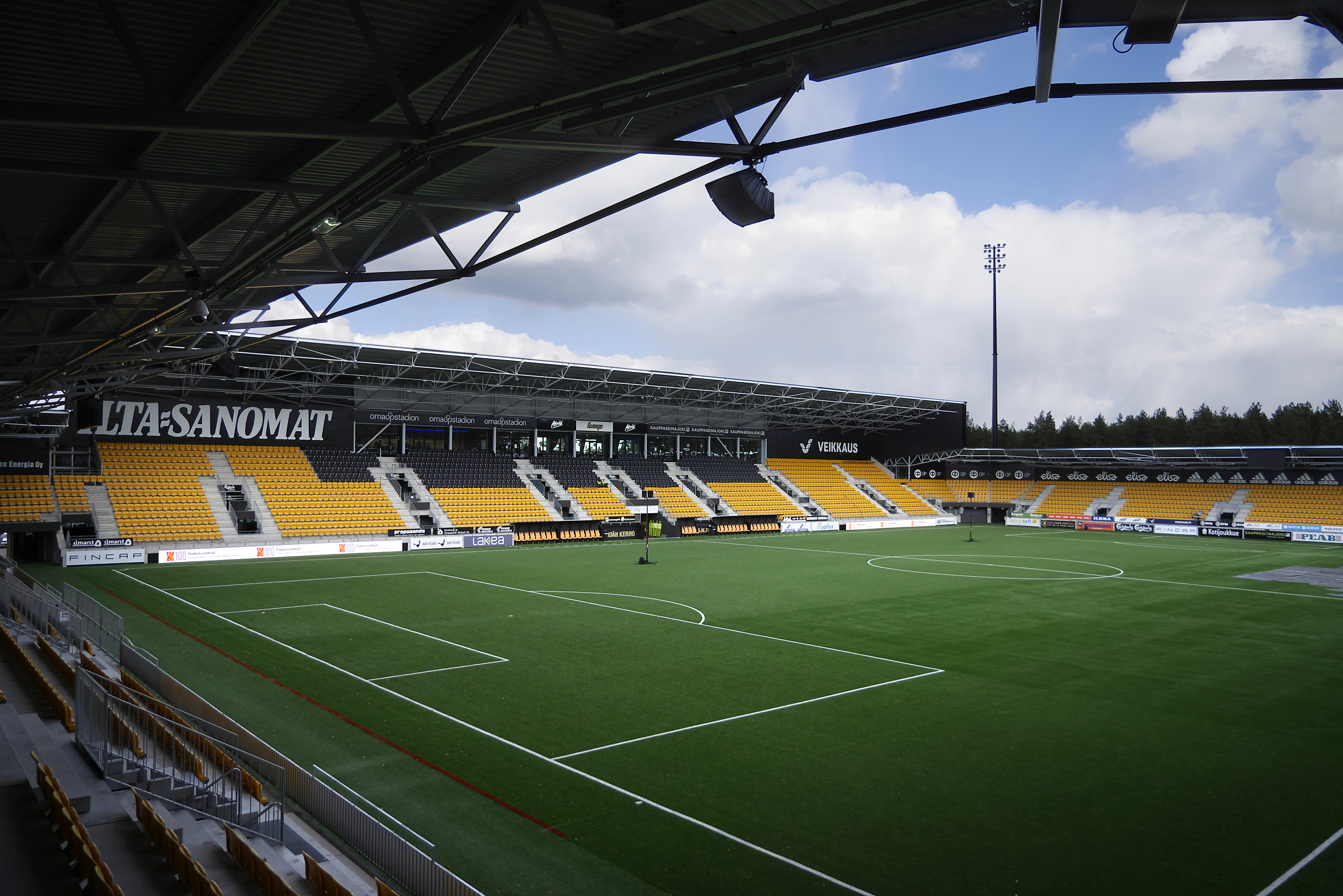
- Interactive map of OmaSP Stadion
- Location: Seinäjoki, Finland
- Coordinates: 62°46′43″N 22°48′53″E
- Owner: Seinäjoki Stadion Oy
- Operator: SJK
- Capacity: 6,075
- Surface: Artificial turf

Construction
- Groundbreaking: 2015
- Built: 2015–2016
- Opened: 2016
- Cost: € 13 million
- Architect: Arkkitehtitoimisto Jääskeläinen Oy

Tenants
- SJK Seinäjoki (2016–present); Seinäjoki Crocodiles (2017)

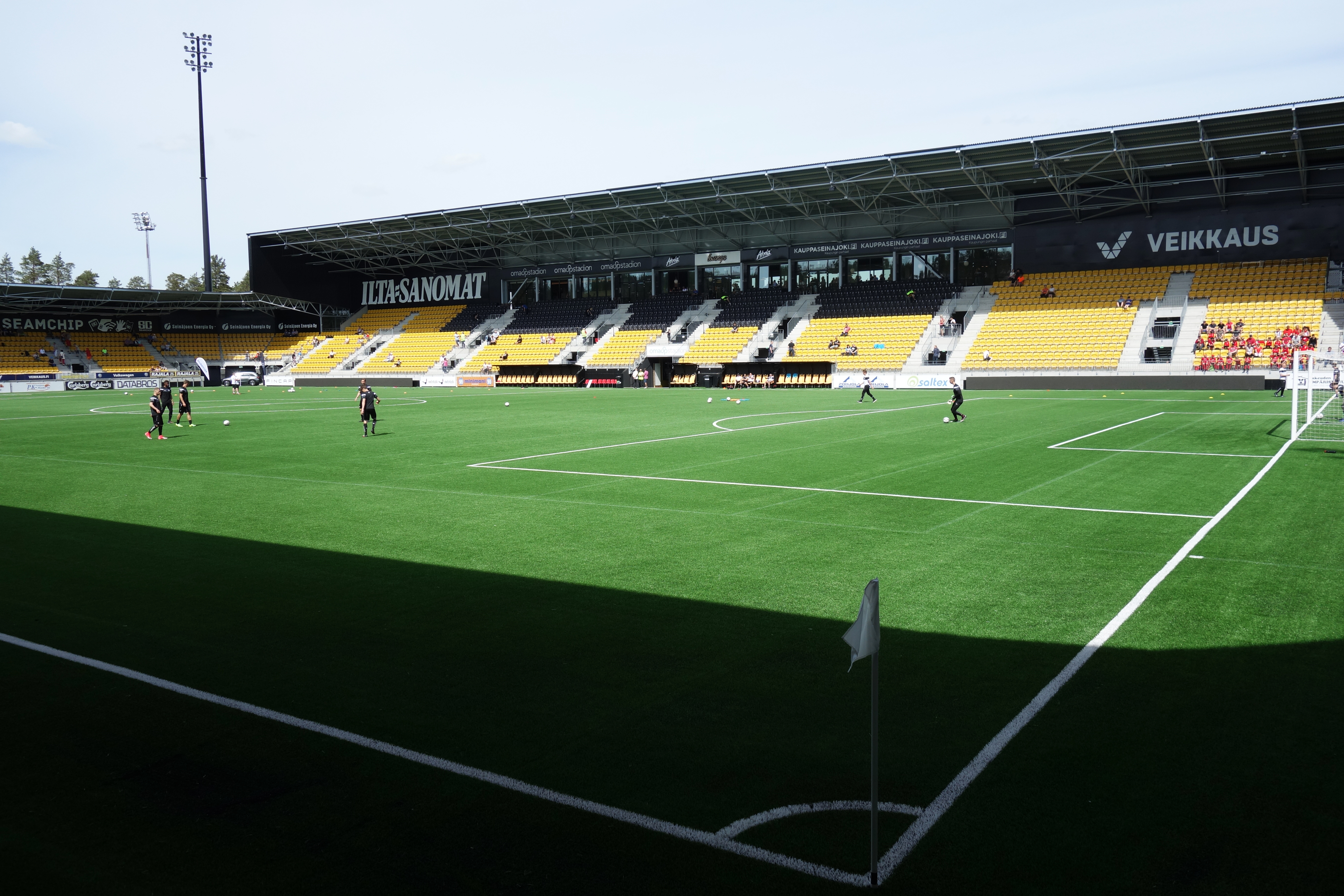

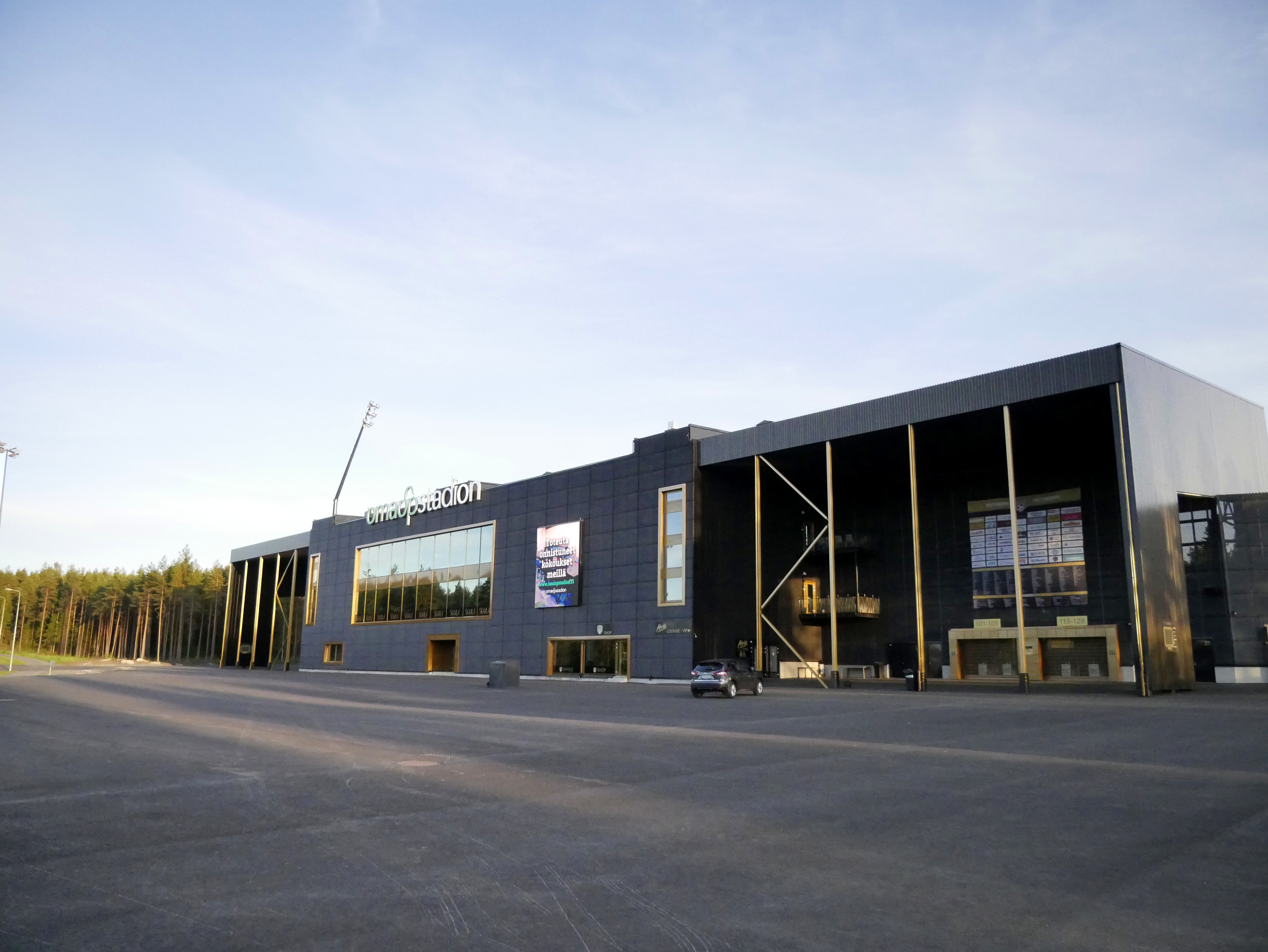
Exterior of OmaSp Stadion in 2017

OmaSP Stadion (also known as Seinäjoki Football Stadium) is a football stadium in Seinäjoki, Finland. It is the home stadium of SJK Seinäjoki of the Veikkausliiga. It is an all-seater stadium with a capacity of 6,075 spectators.

Seinäjoki's American football team Seinäjoki Crocodiles played their home games at OmaSP Stadion during the 2017 season as a part of team's 30th anniversary season.

OmaSP Stadion co-hosted the 2018 UEFA European Under-19 Championship in July 2018.
