= Joel Mero =

Finnish footballer (born 1995)

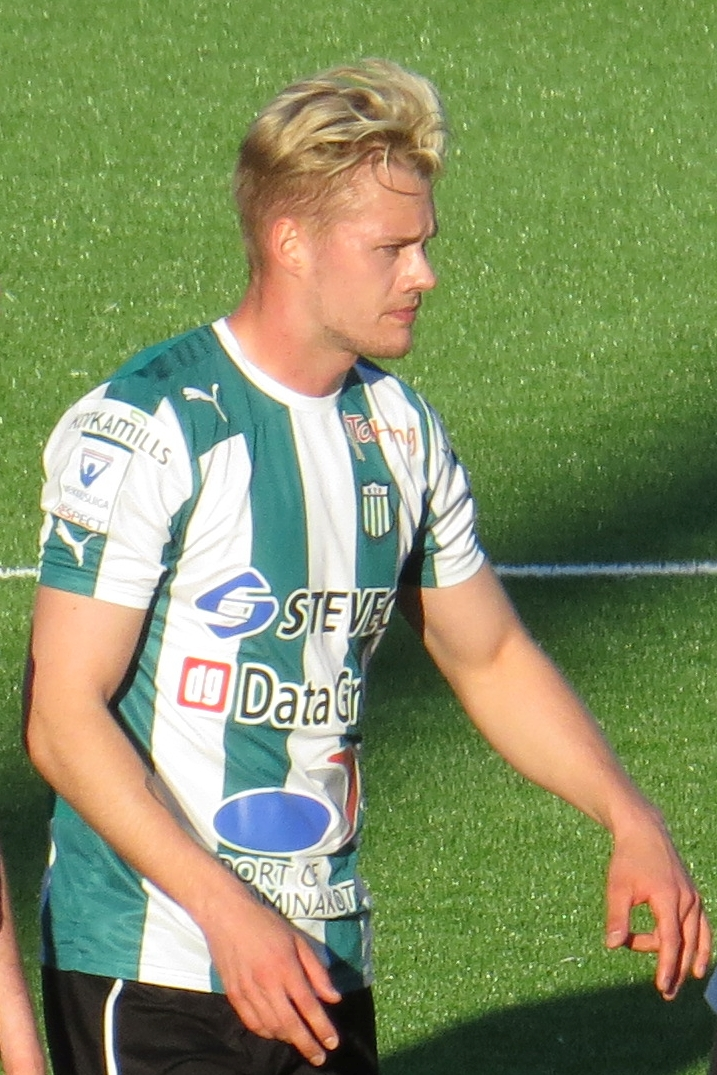

Personal information
- Date of birth: 7 February 1995 (age 31)
- Place of birth: Turku, Finland
- Height: 1.91 m (6 ft 3 in)
- Position: Centre back

Youth career
- –2011: Reipas Lahti
- 2013–2014: Borussia Mönchengladbach

Senior career*
Years	Team	Apps	(Gls)
2012–2013	Lahti	26	(2)
2013–2017	Borussia Mönchengladbach II	11	(0)
2015	→ KTP (loan)	4	(0)
2017–2019	SJK	48	(2)
2020	HIFK	12	(0)

International career
2010–2011	Finland U16	13	(0)
2011–2012	Finland U17	6	(0)
2012	Finland U18	6	(0)
2013	Finland U19	4	(0)
2014	Finland U20	3	(0)
2015	Finland U21	6	(2)
Medal record
FC Lahti
First place	Finnish League Cup	2013
Borussia Mönchengladbach II
First place	Regionalliga West	2015
- * Club domestic league appearances and goals

Joel Mero (born 7 February 1995), is a Finnish former professional football defender. He has represented the Finland national under-21 football team. Mero was born in Turku, Finland. Mero began his senior club career playing for FC Lahti, before signing with Borussia Mönchengladbach at age 18 in 2013.

== Club career ==
=== FC Lahti ===
Mero made his Veikkausliiga debut in June 2012 in a match against Haka. During seasons 2012 and 2013 he made 26 appearances for FC Lahti and scored two goals.

=== Borussia Monchengladbach II ===
On 22 April 2013, it was announced that Borussia Mönchengladbach had signed Mero on a four-year contract, with the young Finn joining the club during the summer 2013.

=== SJK Seinäjoki ===
SJK Seinäjoki published on 3 July 2017 that it had signed Mero.

== International career ==
Mero was a regular in the Finland national under-21 football team and has a total of 32 caps in international junior matches.

== Career statistics ==
=== Club ===
As of 31 December 2016

Club	Season	Division	League		Domestic Cups		Europe		Total	
Club	Season	Division	Apps	Goals	Apps	Goals	Apps	Goals	Apps	Goals
FC Lahti	2012	Veikkausliiga	18	2	1	0	0	0	19	2
FC Lahti	2013	Veikkausliiga	8	0	5	0	0	0	13	0
FC Lahti	Total		26	2	6	0	0	0	32	2
Borussia Mönchengladbach II	2013-14	Regionalliga	3	0	0	0	0	0	3	0
Borussia Mönchengladbach II	2014-15	Regionalliga	3	0	0	0	0	0	3	0
Borussia Mönchengladbach II	2015-16	Regionalliga	5	0	0	0	0	0	5	0
Borussia Mönchengladbach II	2016-17	Regionalliga	0	0	0	0	0	0	0	0
Borussia Mönchengladbach II	Total		11	0	0	0	0	0	11	0
KTP (loan)	2015	Veikkausliiga	4	0	–		–		4	0
SJK	2017	Veikkausliiga	11	2	1	0	–		12	2
SJK	2018	Veikkausliiga	25	0	4	0	–		29	0
SJK	2019	Veikkausliiga	12	0	4	0	–		16	0
SJK	Total		48	2	9	0	0	0	57	2
SJK Akatemia	2019	Kakkonen	5	1	–		–		5	1
HIFK	2020	Veikkausliiga	12	0	3	0	–		15	0
Career Total			106	5	18	0	0	0	124	5

== Honours and achievements ==
=== Club ===
FC Lahti

- Finnish League Cup: 2013

Borussia Mönchengladbach II

- Regionalliga West: 2014–15
