= Sergi Arimany =

Spanish footballer

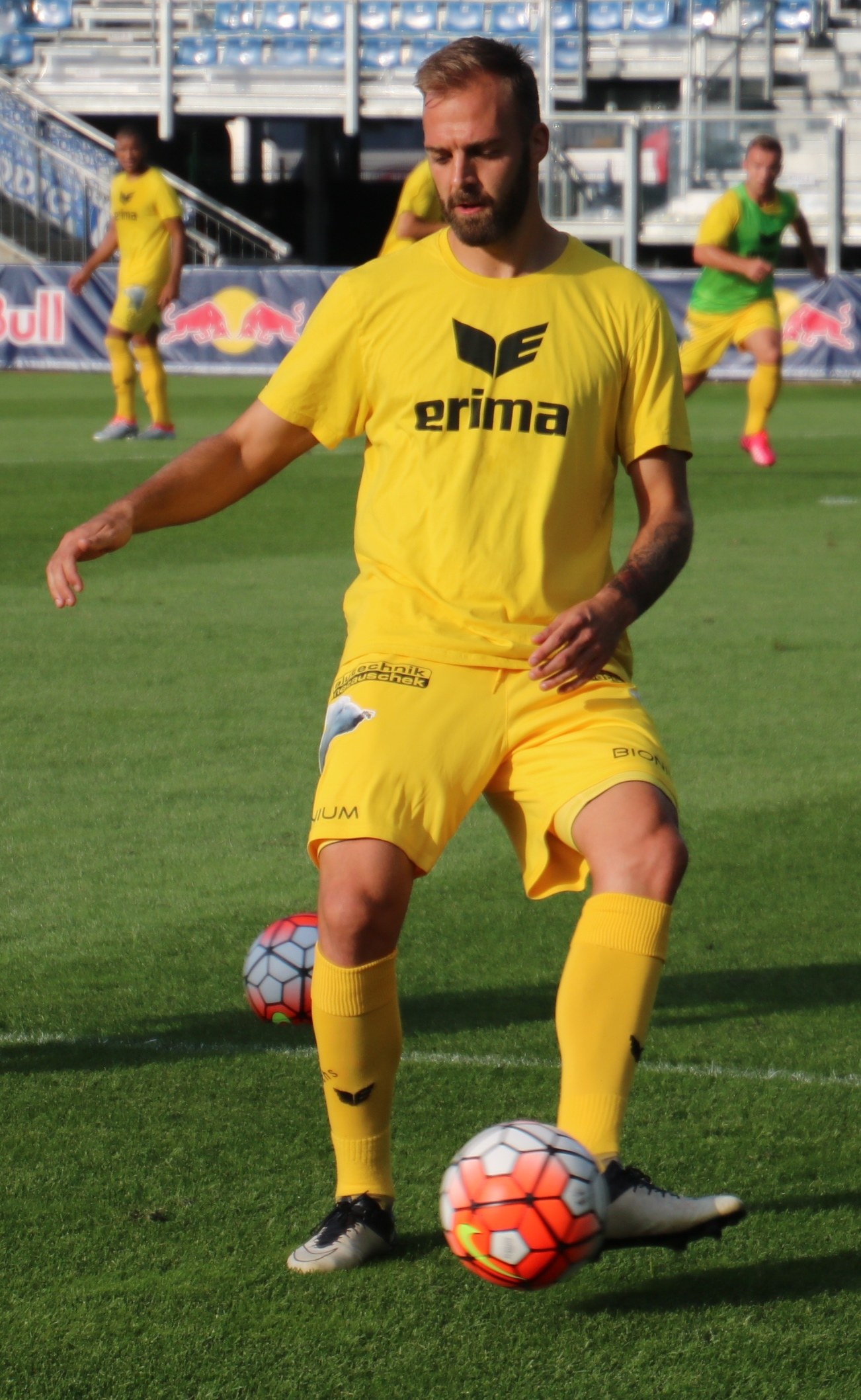

Personal information
- Full name: Sergi Arimany Pruenca
- Date of birth: 31 January 1990 (age 36)
- Place of birth: Olot, Spain
- Height: 1.89 m (6 ft 2 in)
- Position: Forward

Team information
- Current team: Montañesa

Youth career
- 2001–2008: Garrotxa
- 2008–2009: Girona

Senior career*
Years	Team	Apps	(Gls)
2009–2010	Llagostera	27	(5)
2010–2012	Olot	54	(23)
2012–2013	Formentera	16	(1)
2013	La Jonquera	18	(4)
2013–2015	Palamós	66	(29)
2015–2016	Kapfenberger SV	31	(10)
2016	→ Energie Cottbus (loan)	7	(0)
2017	Leioa	11	(2)
2017–2018	SJK	7	(1)
2018–2019	Llagostera	10	(0)
2019-	Montañesa	9	(2)
- * Club domestic league appearances and goals as of 14 June 2019

Sergi Arimany Pruenca (born 31 January 1990) is a Spanish footballer who plays as a forward for UE Llagostera.

== Club career ==
Born in Olot, Girona, Catalonia, Arimany finished his graduation with neighbouring Girona FC. On 2 September 2009, he moved to Tercera División club UE Llagostera, making his senior debut in 2009.

Arimany continued to appear in the fourth division in the following years, representing UE Olot, SD Formentera, UE La Jonquera and Palamós CF. With the latter he scored a career-best 17 goals during the 2014–15 campaign.

In July 2015, Arimany signed for Austrian Football First League club Kapfenberger SV on a one-year contract with the option of another year. He made his professional debut on 24 July by starting in a 0–0 away draw against FC Wacker Innsbruck, and scored his first goals on 4 August, netting a double in a 5–2 home routing of FC Liefering.

In January 2016, Arimany joined German 3. Liga club FC Energie Cottbus on loan until the end of the season, with a buyout clause. He appeared sparingly, and subsequently returned to his parent club.

In January 2017, Arimany signed for Segunda División B club SD Leioa.

On 24 June 2017 he signed with Finnish side Seinäjoen Jalkapallokerho.

On 29 January 2018 Arimany signed for Segunda División B club Llagostera.

In February 2019, Arimany signed for Primera Catalana club CF Montañesa.
