= Dani Hatakka =

Finnish footballer (born 1994)

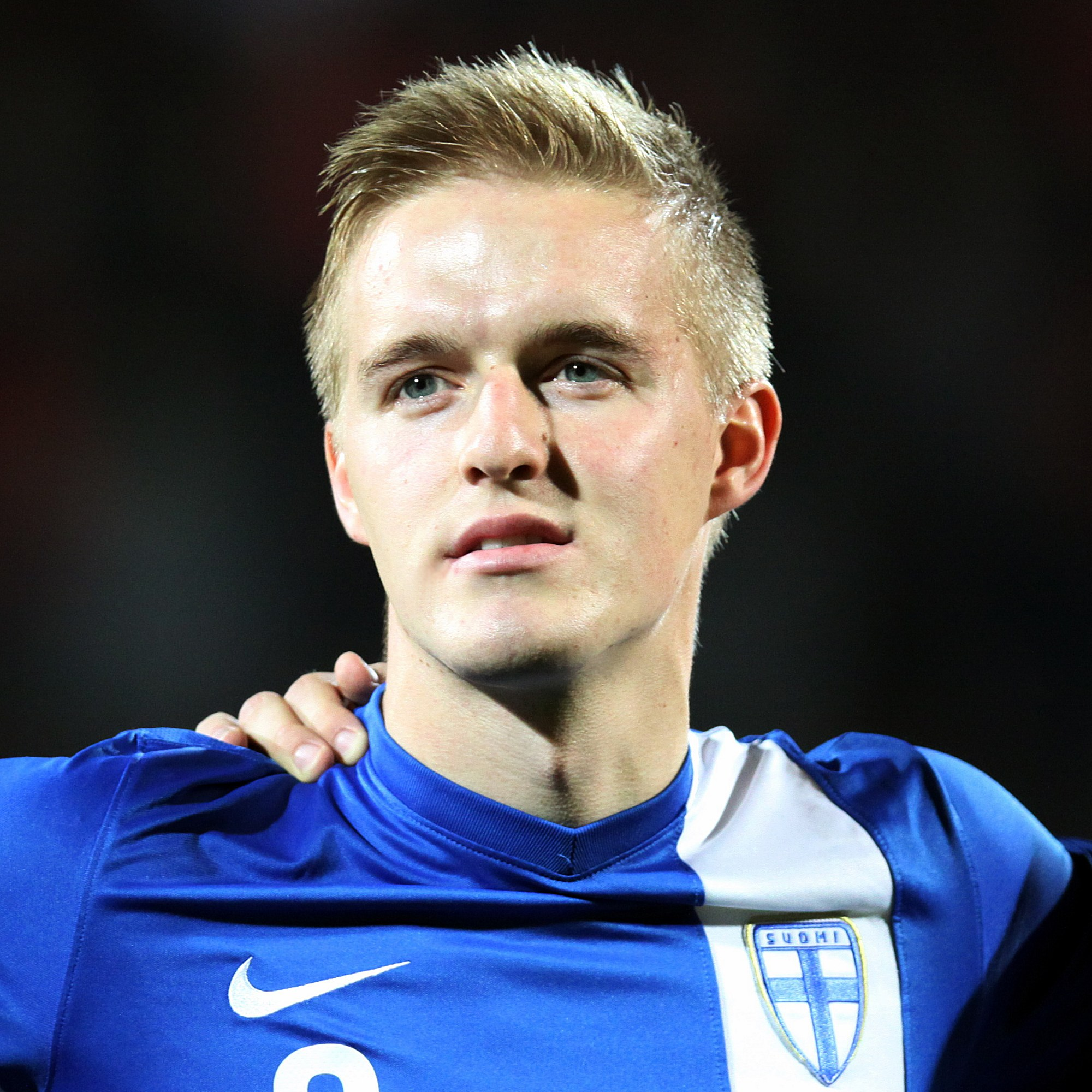
- Hatakka with Finland U21 in 2015

Personal information
- Full name: Dani Aleksi Hatakka
- Date of birth: 12 March 1994 (age 32)
- Place of birth: Espoo, Finland
- Height: 1.85 m (6 ft 1 in)
- Position: Centre-back

Senior career*
Years	Team	Apps	(Gls)
2012–2014	Honka	44	(1)
2013	→ AC Oulu (loan)	8	(3)
2015–2016	KuPS	29	(0)
2016–2017	Brann	1	(0)
2016	→ IL Hødd (loan)	7	(0)
2017	→ SJK (loan)	24	(2)
2017–2019	SJK	31	(2)
2020–2021	Honka	37	(1)
2022	Keflavík	26	(4)
2023	FH	18	(2)

International career
2010–2011	Finland U17	3	(0)
2011–2012	Finland U19	3	(1)
2014–2015	Finland U21	8	(1)
- * Club domestic league appearances and goals as of 31 December 2023

Dani Aleksi Hatakka (born 12 March 1994) is a Finnish former professional footballer who last played for Icelandic club FH. He played as a central defender or a right-back.

== Career statistics ==
As of 1 September 2024

Appearances and goals by club, season and competition
Club	Season	League			National cup (Note: Includes Suomen Cup, Norwegian Cup and Icelandic Cup)		League cup (Note: Includes Finnish League Cup and Icelandic League Cup)		Europe		Total	
Club	Season	Division	Apps	Goals	Apps	Goals	Apps	Goals	Apps	Goals	Apps	Goals
Pallohonka	2011	Kakkonen	18	2	–		–		–		18	2
Pallohonka	2012	Kakkonen	4	2	–		–		–		4	2
Pallohonka	Total		22	4	0	0	0	0	0	0	22	4
Honka	2012	Veikkausliiga	12	0	1	0	2	0	–		15	0
Honka	2013	Veikkausliiga	8	0	1	0	2	0	0	0	11	0
Honka	2014	Veikkausliiga	24	1	1	0	3	0	2 (Note: Appearances in UEFA Europa League)	0	30	1
Honka	Total		44	1	3	0	7	0	2	0	56	1
AC Oulu (loan)	2013	Ykkönen	8	3	–		–		–		8	3
KuPS	2015	Veikkausliiga	29	0	5	0	2	0	–		36	0
Brann	2016	Tippeligaen	1	0	1	0	–		–		2	0
Brann 2	2016	3. divisjon	8	1	–		–		–		8	1
IL Hødd (loan)	2016	1. divisjon	7	0	–		–		–		7	0
SJK Seinäjoki (loan)	2017	Veikkausliiga	24	2	3	0	–		2	0	29	2
SJK Seinäjoki	2018	Veikkausliiga	10	1	5	0	–		–		15	1
SJK Seinäjoki	2019	Veikkausliiga	21	1	5	0	–		–		26	1
SJK Seinäjoki	Total		31	2	10	0	0	0	0	0	41	2
SJK Akatemia	2018	Kakkonen	3	0	–		–		–		3	0
Honka	2020	Veikkausliiga	16	0	4	0	–		1	0	21	0
Honka	2021	Veikkausliiga	21	1	5	0	–		4 (Note: Appearances in UEFA Conference League)	0	30	1
Honka	Total		37	1	9	0	0	0	5	0	51	1
Keflavík	2022	Besta deild karla	26	4	0	0	3	0	–		29	4
FH	2023	Besta deild karla	18	2	3	0	4	0	–		25	2
Career total			268	20	34	0	16	0	9	0	327	20
