= Matti Klinga =

Finnish footballer (born 1994)

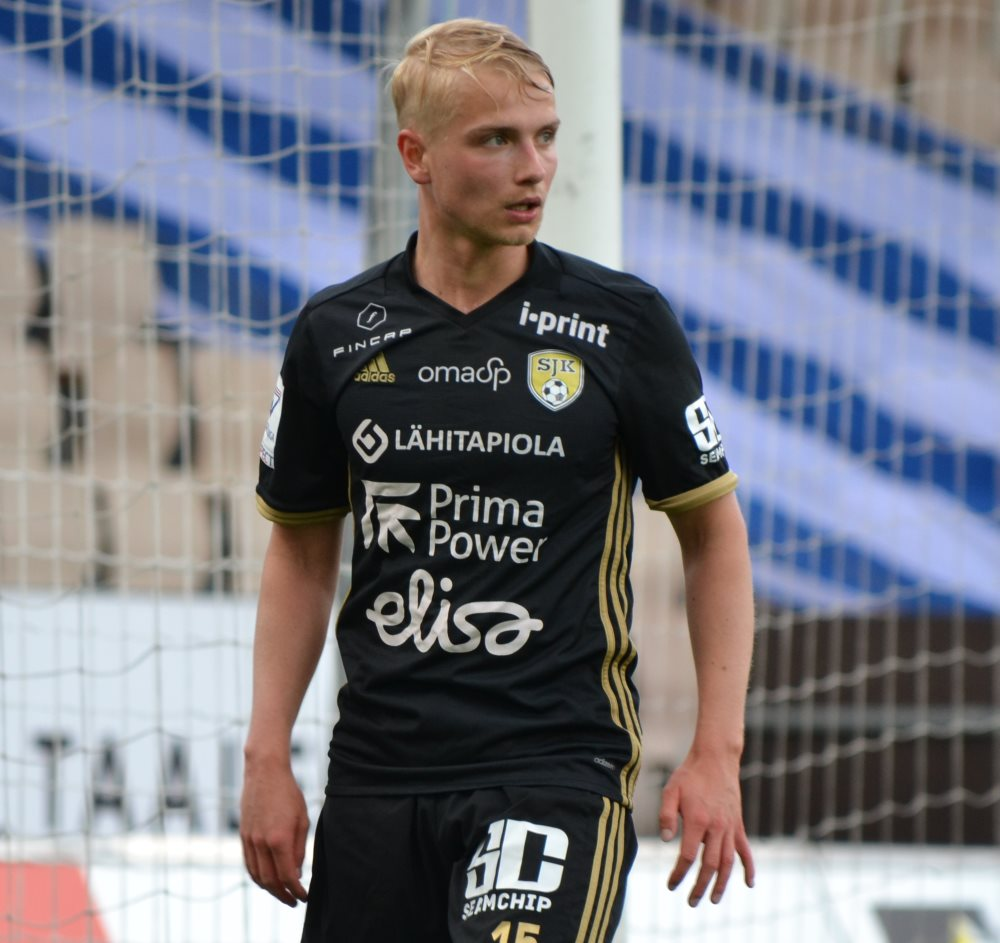

Personal information
- Date of birth: 10 December 1994 (age 31)
- Place of birth: Helsinki, Finland
- Height: 1.73 m (5 ft 8 in)
- Position: Central midfielder

Team information
- Current team: Reipas Lahti

Youth career
- –2011: Reipas Lahti

Senior career*
Years	Team	Apps	(Gls)
2011–14	Lahti	71	(4)
2015	HJK	19	(1)
2016–2018	SJK	74	(4)
2019–2023	Lahti	104	(3)
2024–	Reipas Lahti	23	(0)

International career
2010–2011	Finland U17	3	(0)
2011–	Finland U19	5	(1)
2012–2016	Finland U21	9	(1)
- * Club domestic league appearances and goals as of 28 October 2024

Matti Klinga (born 10 December 1994) is a Finnish footballer currently playing for Reipas Lahti.

== Career ==
Klinga is a youth prospect of Reipas Lahti. As a youth player, Klinga has also played for HIFK Fotboll and Pallokerho-35.

Klinga made his professional debut in a match against Porin Palloilijat in Ykkönen on 30 May 2011. After signing for FC Lahti, he played three seasons for the team and signed for HJK Helsinki in the season 2015. In March 2016, Klinga signed a contract with SJK Seinäjoki.

=== Return to FC Lahti ===
Klinga returned to FC Lahti for the 2019 season.
