= Matej Hradecky =

Finnish footballer (born 1995)

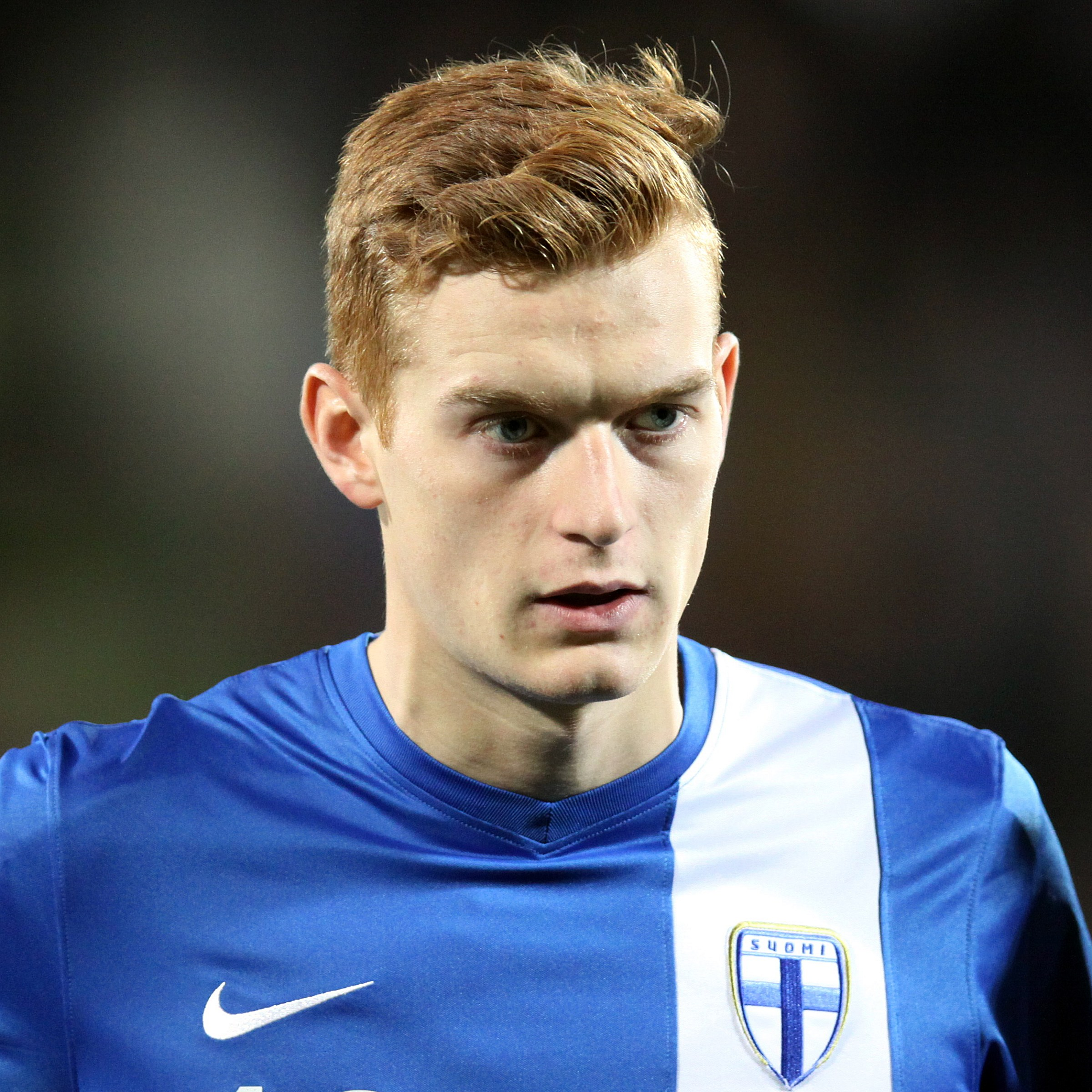

Personal information
- Date of birth: 17 April 1995 (age 31)
- Place of birth: Turku, Finland
- Height: 1.93 m (6 ft 4 in)
- Position: Centre back

Team information
- Current team: TPS
- Number: 14

Youth career
- TPS

Senior career*
Years	Team	Apps	(Gls)
2012–2015	TPS	56	(4)
2012–2013	→ Åbo IFK (loan)	5	(1)
2016–2017	SJK	32	(4)
2019–2020	TPS	12	(1)
2020	SJK	19	(2)
2021	HIFK	23	(0)
2022–2023	SJK	52	(1)
2024–2025	Skalica	36	(2)
2026–	TPS	26	(1)

International career^{‡}
2014	Finland U19	4	(0)
2015–2016	Finland U21	13	(0)
2016–2017	Finland	2	(0)
- * Club domestic league appearances and goals as of 13 November 2026 ‡ National team caps and goals as of 30 March 2018

Matej Hradecky (Slovak: Matej Hrádecký, born 17 April 1995) is a Finnish footballer who plays for Veikkausliiga club TPS.

== Club career ==
=== Early career ===
At the start of his career, Hradecky played as a midfielder. On 16 February 2016, he signed a two-year contract with SJK. In February 2017, Hradecky was ruled out of the 2017 season through injury. He eventually missed the 2018 season too.

=== Skalica ===
On 15 January 2024, Hradecky signed for Skalica of the Slovak Super Liga. He debuted for Skalica in a 1–0 loss to FC DAC 1904 Dunajská Streda. 2 months later, he scored his first goal for the green and whites in a 4–1 win over FC ViOn Zlaté Moravce. Hradecky scored the winning goal for Skalica in a 1–0 victory over league newcomers FC Košice, securing 3rd place in the relegation-play offs.

== Personal life ==
Hradecky's brothers Lukáš and Tomáš are also professional footballers. The brothers are of Slovak descent.

== Career statistics ==
As of 27 July 2026

Appearances and goals by club, season and competition
Club	Season	League			Cup (Note: Includes Suomen Cup and Slovak Cup)		League cup		Europe		Total	
Club	Season	Division	Apps	Goals	Apps	Goals	Apps	Goals	Apps	Goals	Apps	Goals
TPS	2012	Veikkausliiga	2	0	0	0	0	0	–		2	0
TPS	2013	Veikkausliiga	6	0	0	0	3	0	2 (Note: Appearance(s) in UEFA Europa League)	0	11	0
TPS	2014	Veikkausliiga	27	0	1	0	4	0	–		32	0
TPS	2015	Veikkausliiga	21	4	0	0	0	0	–		21	4
TPS	Total		56	4	1	0	7	0	2	0	66	4
ÅIFK (loan)	2012	Kakkonen	2	0	0	0	–		–		2	0
ÅIFK (loan)	2013	Kakkonen	3	1	0	0	–		–		3	1
ÅIFK (loan)	Total		5	1	0	0	–	–	–	–	5	1
SJK	2016	Veikkausliiga	32	4	4	1	4	0	2 (Note: Appearance(s) in UEFA Champions League)	0	42	5
SJK	2017	Veikkausliiga	0	0	3	0	–		0	0	3	0
SJK	Total		32	4	7	1	4	0	2	0	45	5
TPS	2019	Ykkönen	12	1	0	0	–		–		12	1
SJK	2020	Veikkausliiga	19	2	0	0	–		–		19	2
HIFK	2021	Veikkausliiga	23	0	2	0	–		–		25	0
SJK	2022	Veikkausliiga	25	1	1	0	4	0	4 (Note: Appearance(s) in UEFA Europa Conference League)	0	34	1
SJK	2023	Veikkausliiga	27	0	1	0	5	1	–		33	1
SJK	Total		52	1	2	0	9	1	4	0	67	2
Skalica	2023–24	Slovak Super Liga	13	2	0	0	–		–		13	2
Skalica	2024–25	Slovak Super Liga	23	0	2	0	–		–		25	0
Skalica	Total		36	2	2	0	0	0	0	0	38	2
TPS	2026	Veikkausliiga	16	1	0	0	–		–		16	1
TPS	Total		16	1	0	0	0	0	0	0	16	1
Career total			253	16	12	1	20	1	8	0	279	15

=== International ===
Finland
Year	Apps	Goals
2016	1	0
2017	1	0
Total	2	0

Statistics accurate as of match played 9 January 2017
