= Elias Ahde =

Finnish footballer (born 1996)

Personal information
- Date of birth: 6 March 1996 (age 30)
- Place of birth: Ilmajoki, Finland
- Height: 1.86 m (6 ft 1 in)
- Position: Striker

Team information
- Current team: Pallo-Iirot
- Number: 18

Senior career*
| Years | Team | Apps | (Gls) |
| 2013–2015 | SJK II | 27 | (13) |
| 2013–2019 | SJK | 7 | (0) |
| 2015 | → Jazz (loan) | 17 | (5) |
| 2015 | → Jazz (loan) | 6 | (5) |
| 2016 | → Jazz (loan) | 11 | (6) |
| 2016 | → Haka (loan) | 11 | (6) |
| 2017 | → JJK (loan) | 6 | (2) |
| 2017 | → KPV (loan) | 11 | (3) |
| 2018 | → TPS (loan) | 21 | (4) |
| 2019 | Haka | 16 | (7) |
| 2020 | KPV | 22 | (2) |
| 2021 | Jazz | 22 | (10) |
| 2022– | Pallo-Iirot | 40 | (43) |
- * Club domestic league appearances and goals as of 14 March 2024

Elias Ahde (born 6 March 1996) is a Finnish professional footballer who plays as striker for Pallo-Iirot in Kakkonen.

== Honours ==
SJK

- Veikkausliiga runner-up: 2014
- Finnish League Cup runner-up: 2016

Haka

- Ykkönen: 2019
