= Paavo Valakari =

Finnish footballer (born 1997)

Personal information
- Date of birth: 28 December 1997 (age 28)
- Place of birth: Helsinki, Finland
- Height: 1.80 m (5 ft 11 in)
- Position: Goalkeeper

Team information
- Current team: St Johnstone (performance coach)

Youth career
- 2003–2014: SJK

Senior career*
Years	Team	Apps	(Gls)
2013–2018	SJK	1	(0)
2013–2018	SJK II	54	(0)
2016	→ Lapuan Virkiä (loan)	4	(0)
2016	→ SalPa (loan)	6	(0)
2018	→ JJK (loan)	10	(0)
2019	KäPa	18	(0)
2020–2021	ÖBK	16	(0)

Managerial career
- 2023–2024: SJK women
- * Club domestic league appearances and goals

Paavo Valakari (born 28 December 1997) is a Finnish football coach and former player who played as a goalkeeper. He is a performance coach of Scottish club St Johnstone.

== Playing career ==
Valakari signed with Käpylän Pallo for the 2019 season.

== Coaching career ==
In December 2024, Valakari became a performance coach of Scottish club St Johnstone.

== Personal life ==
His father Simo is a former professional player and currently a football manager. His younger brothers Onni and Toivo are also footballers.
