= Tomas Hradecký =

Finnish footballer (born 1992)

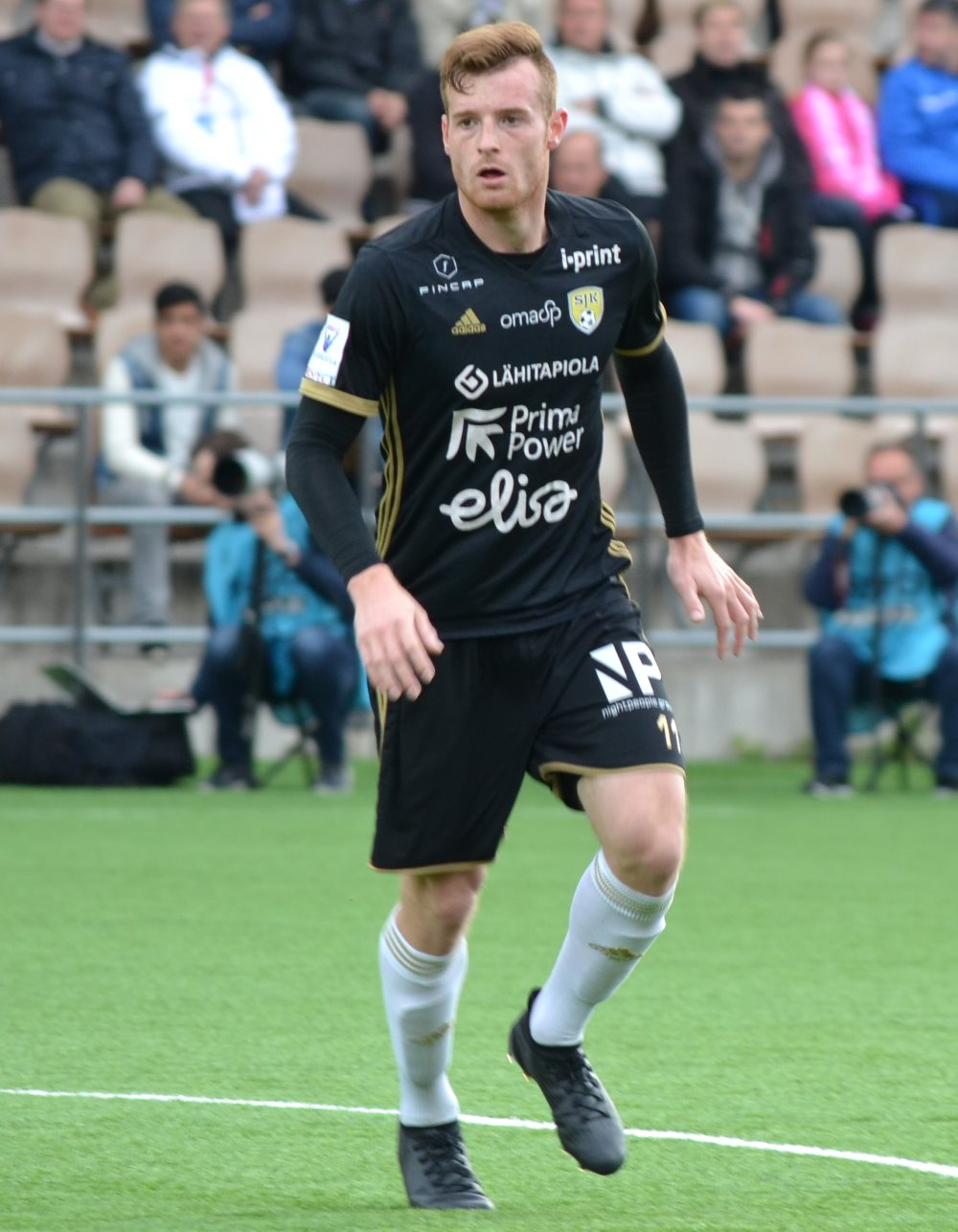

Personal information
- Date of birth: 13 October 1992 (age 34)
- Place of birth: Turku, Finland
- Position: Midfielder

Team information
- Current team: Kiffen/3

Youth career
- TPS

Senior career*
Years	Team	Apps	(Gls)
2011–2012	Åbo IFK	42	(5)
2013	SalPa	13	(1)
2013–2014	IFK Mariehamn	42	(3)
2015	RoPS	21	(1)
2015	→ FC Santa Claus (loan)	2	(0)
2015–2017	Bohemians 1905	1	(0)
2017	SJK	22	(2)
2018–2019	TPS	5	(0)
2020–2022	PIF	48	(2)
2022	PIF II	1	(1)
2023–	Kiffen/3	19	(6)
- * Club domestic league appearances and goals as of 27 June 2024

Tomas Hradecký (Slovak: Tomáš Hrádecký; born 13 October 1992) is a Finnish footballer who plays for Kiffen/3 in Finnish sixth-tier Nelonen as a midfielder. He is of Slovak descent. He is the brother of Lukáš Hrádecký and Matej Hradecky.
