= Nosh A Lody =

Finnish footballer (born 1989)

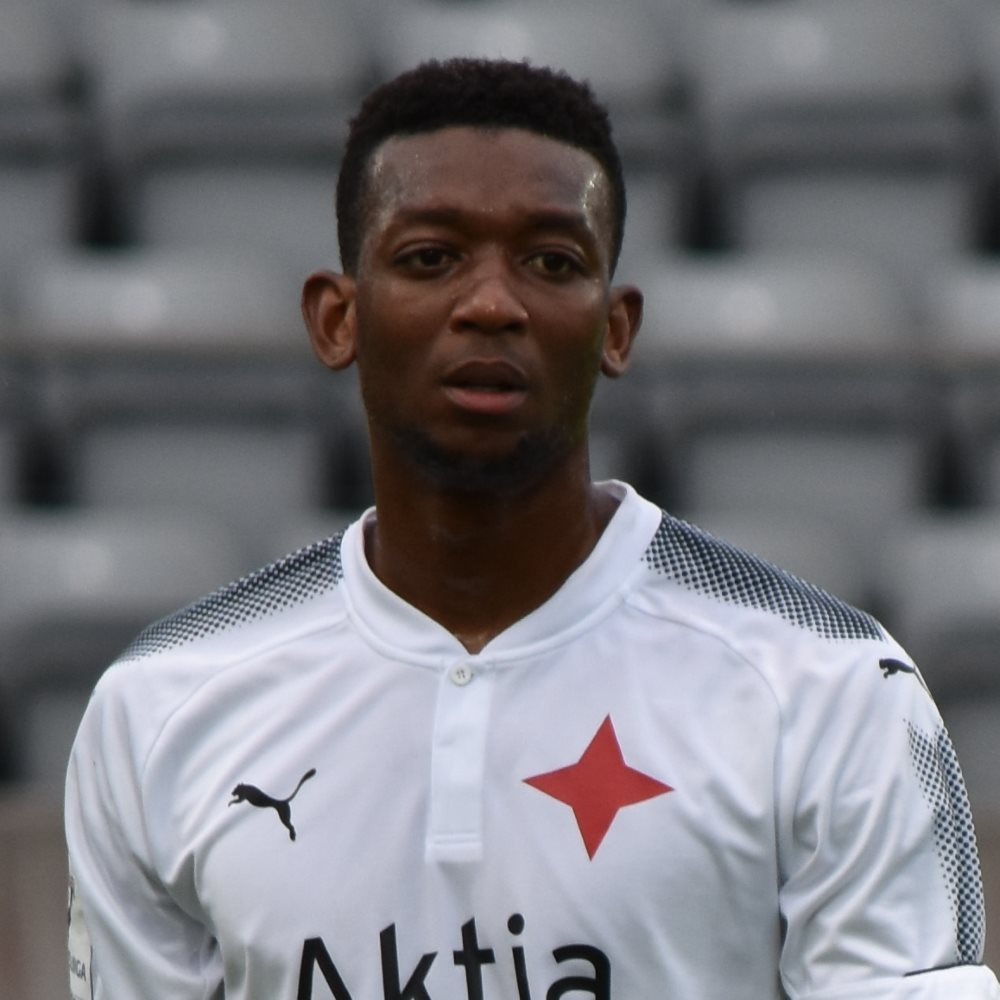
- A Lody with HIFK in 2017

Personal information
- Full name: Nongotamba Shutsa A Lody
- Date of birth: 17 July 1989 (age 37)
- Place of birth: Likasi, Zaire
- Height: 1.94 m (6 ft 4 1/2 in)
- Position: Centre back

Youth career
- 2005–2006: SAPA
- 2007–2008: HJK Helsinki

Senior career*
Years	Team	Apps	(Gls)
2009–2010	Klubi 04	17	(0)
2010–2011	Jaro	23	(0)
2012–2014	MYPA	81	(2)
2014–2016	KTP	30	(1)
2016	PK-35 Vantaa	5	(0)
2016	Honka	6	(0)
2017	HIFK	27	(0)
2018	KäPa	6	(0)
2019	Someron Voima	17	(1)

International career
- Finland U19
	Finland U20	5	(0)
- * Club domestic league appearances and goals as of 10:58, 23 November 2018 (UTC)

Nongotamba Shutsa "Nosh" A Lody (born 17 July 1989) is a Finnish former footballer.
