= Jesse Sarajärvi =

Finnish footballer (born 1995)

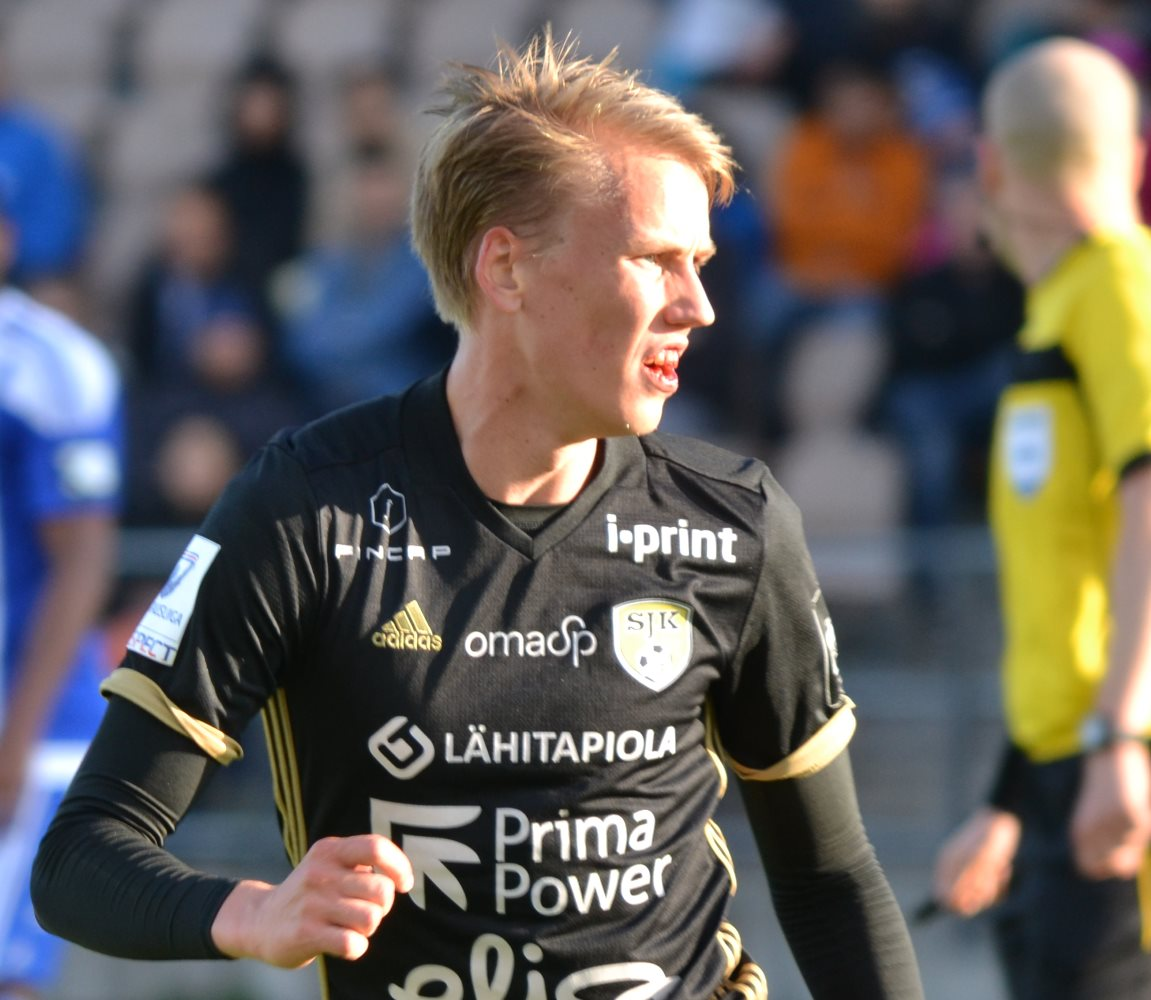

Personal information
- Full name: Jesse Otto Sarajärvi
- Date of birth: 20 May 1995 (age 31)
- Place of birth: Seinäjoki, Finland
- Height: 1.85 m (6 ft 1 in)
- Position: Right midfielder

Youth career
- 2005–2006: TP-Seinäjoki
- 2007–2014: SJK

Senior career*
Years	Team	Apps	(Gls)
2012–2019	SJK	90	(6)
2012	→ FC YPA (loan)	2	(0)
2012–2015	SJK Akatemia	65	(8)
2016	→ FC Haka (loan)	9	(0)
- * Club domestic league appearances and goals as of 1 October 2016

Jesse Otto Sarajärvi (born 20 May 1995) is a Finnish footballer, who most recently played for Seinäjoen Jalkapallokerho.

Sarajärvi was a part of the Veikkausliiga title winning SJK in 2015, but only played in one game. It was the first title in club history. He made his SJK debut in 2012.

In January 2020 it was told that Sarajärvi would take a break from football because of a tumour in his pituitary gland.

Sarajärvi's father is entrepreneur and SJK chairman Raimo Sarajärvi.
