= 2018 SJK season =

SJK
2018 season
- Chairman: Raimo Sarajärvi
- Manager: Tommi Kautonen (until 22 May); Aleksei Yeryomenko (from 22 May)
- Stadium: OmaSP Stadion
- Veikkausliiga: 9th
- Finnish Cup: Quarterfinal vs FC Honka
- Top goalscorer: League: Johannes Laaksonen (6); All: Two Players (6)
Home colours	Away colours

The 2018 season is Seinäjoen Jalkapallokerho's 11th competitive season, and fifth in the Veikkausliiga.

== Season events ==
On 22 May, SJK announced that Aleksei Yeryomenko had replaced Tommi Kautonen after their poor start to the season.

== Squad ==
As of 21 August 2018

Note: Flags indicate national team as defined under FIFA eligibility rules; some limited exceptions apply. Players may hold more than one non-FIFA nationality.

No.	Pos.	Nation	Player
1	GK	FIN	Jesse Öst
2	DF	FIN	Joel Mero
4	DF	WAL	Richie Dorman
5	DF	FIN	Dani Hatakka
6	MF	SWE	Anders Bååth
8	MF	FIN	Johannes Laaksonen
10	FW	ENG	Billy Ions
11	DF	ENG	Jordan Mustoe
14	FW	FIN	Maximo Tolonen
15	MF	FIN	Matti Klinga
16	DF	FIN	Joonas Sundman
17	MF	FIN	Ville Tikkanen
18	DF	FIN	Jarkko Hurme

No.	Pos.	Nation	Player
19	MF	FIN	Obed Malolo
21	MF	KEN	Peter Opiyo
22	FW	TTO	Shahdon Winchester
23	DF	CIV	Didier Kadio
25	FW	SEN	Emile Paul Tendeng
26	MF	FIN	Jesse Sarajärvi
27	MF	FIN	Joona Lautamaja
28	MF	UKR	Denys Oliynyk
29	MF	ENG	Danny O'Brien
31	GK	FIN	Paavo Valakari
33	GK	EST	Mihkel Aksalu (captain)
37	FW	COD	Aristote M'Boma
58	MF	FIN	Mehmet Hetemaj

=== Out on loan ===
As of 2 April 2018

Note: Flags indicate national team as defined under FIFA eligibility rules; some limited exceptions apply. Players may hold more than one non-FIFA nationality.

No. / Pos. / Nation / Player; 22 / GK / FIN / Teppo Marttinen (at KPV)	No. / Pos. / Nation / Player; — / FW / FIN / Elias Ahde (at TPS)

== Transfers ==
=== Winter ===
In: Note: Flags indicate national team as defined under FIFA eligibility rules; some limited exceptions apply. Players may hold more than one non-FIFA nationality.

No.	Pos.	Nation	Player
6	MF	SWE	Anders Bååth (from (Sweden) IF Brommapojkarna)
7	MF	GHA	Reuben Ayarna (from (Finland) Ilves)
11	DF	ENG	Jordan Mustoe (from (Belgium) Westerlo)
14	FW	FIN	Maximo Tolonen (from (Finland) Honka)
25	FW	SEN	Emile Paul Tendeng (from (Finland) Ilves)
—	DF	SWE	Kyle Konwea (from (Sweden) IF Brommapojkarna)

Out: Note: Flags indicate national team as defined under FIFA eligibility rules; some limited exceptions apply. Players may hold more than one non-FIFA nationality.

No.	Pos.	Nation	Player
6	MF	FIN	Matej Hradecky
7	DF	FIN	Timo Tahvanainen (to (Finland) JIPPO)
9	FW	ESP	Sergi Arimany (to (Spain) Llagostera)
11	MF	FIN	Tomas Hradecky (to (Finland) TPS)
14	FW	ENG	Kaine Sheppard (to (Australia) Avondale United)
22	DF	ESP	Diego Bardanca (to (Spain) UD Ibiza)
24	GK	EST	Marten Ritson (to (Estonia) Viljandi Tulevik)
25	FW	FIN	Elias Ahde (loan to (Finland) TPS)
29	DF	ESP	Chema Antón
80	MF	FIN	Erfan Zeneli
—	DF	SWE	Kyle Konwea (to (Sweden) Assyriska FF)

=== In ===
Date	Position	Nationality	Name	From	Fee	Ref.
26 July 2018	MF	(Kenya)	Peter Opiyo		Free	
26 July 2018	MF	(Ukraine)	Denys Oliynyk	Helios Kharkiv	Undisclosed	
26 July 2018	FW	(Trinidad and Tobago)	Shahdon Winchester	Murciélagos	Undisclosed	
10 August 2018	DF	(Ivory Coast)	Didier Kadio	FC Pyunik	Undisclosed	

=== Out ===
Date	Position	Nationality	Name	To	Fee	Ref.
24 July 2018	DF	(Andorra)	Marc Vales	Sandefjord	Free	
2 August 2018	MF	(Ghana)	Reuben Ayarna	KuPS	Undisclosed	
2 August 2018	FW	(Finland)	Vahid Hambo	RoPS	Undisclosed	

=== Released ===
Date	Position	Nationality	Name	Joined	Date
30 November 2018	GK	(Finland)	Paavo Valakari	KäPa	
30 November 2018	DF	(England)	Jordan Mustoe	Dinamo București	15 January 2019
30 November 2018	MF	(England)	Danny O'Brien	Alfreton Town	30 November 2018
30 November 2018	MF	(Finland)	Matti Klinga	Lahti	1 December 2018
30 November 2018	MF	(Kenya)	Peter Opiyo	Altyn Asyr	August 2019
30 November 2018	MF	(Sweden)	Anders Bååth	Syrianska	
30 November 2018	FW	(Cameroon)	Emile Paul Tendeng	Ilves	1 December 2018
30 November 2018	FW	(Democratic Republic of the Congo)	Aristote M'Boma	IFK Mariehamn	
30 November 2018	FW	(Finland)	Elias Ahde		
30 November 2018	FW	(Trinidad and Tobago)	Shahdon Winchester		
31 December 2018	MF	(Finland)	Johannes Laaksonen	Sandnes Ulf	14 January 2019

== Competitions ==
=== Veikkausliiga ===
==== League table ====
Pos	Team	Pld	W	D	L	GF	GA	GD	Pts	Qualification or relegation
7	Inter Turku	33	10	10	13	37	44	−7	40	Qualification for the Europa League first qualifying round (Note: Inter Turku qualified for the Europa League first qualifying round by winning the 2017-18 Finnish Cup)
8	Lahti	33	9	13	11	30	38	−8	40	
9	SJK	33	8	8	17	28	37	−9	32	
10	IFK Mariehamn	33	8	7	18	37	59	−22	31	
11	TPS (R)	33	7	8	18	37	55	−18	29	Qualification for the relegation play-offs

Source: Veikkausliiga (in Finnish), Soccerway
Rules for classification: 1) Points; 2) Goal difference; 3) Goals scored; 4) Head-to-head points; 5) Head-to-head goal difference; 6) Head-to-head away goals scored; 7) Play-off
(Note: Play-off is only played if need to decide champion, teams for relegation or UEFA competition and will be played on a neutral ground).
(R) Relegated

==== Results summary ====
Overall								Home						Away					
Pld	W	D	L	GF	GA	GD	Pts	W	D	L	GF	GA	GD	W	D	L	GF	GA	GD
33	8	8	17	28	37	−9	32	5	4	8	19	19	0	3	4	9	9	18	−9

Last updated: 27 October 2018.
Source: See Results

==== Results by matchday ====
Matchday	1	2	3	4	5	6	7	8	9	10	11	12	13	14	15	16	17	18	19	20	21	22	23	24	25	26	27	28	29	30	31	32	33
Ground	H	A	H	H	A	H	A	H	H	A	A	H	A	A	H	A	H	H	A	A	A	H	A	H	A	H	H	A	H	A	H	A	H
Result	L	W	L	W	D	L	L	L	D	L	D	W	L	L	L	D	W	W	L	L	L	D	W	L	D	L	W	L	D	W	L	L	D

Updated to match(es) played on 27 October 2018. Source: See results
A = Away; H = Home; W = Win; D = Draw; L = Loss

==== Results ====
7 April 2018 1	SJK	0 – 1	PS Kemi	Seinäjoki
17:00 EEST (UTC+3)	Hurme (yellow card) 45'	Report	Guevara (yellow card) 42' (goal) 76'; K.Heinolainen (yellow card) 45'; A.Vidjeskog (yellow card) 87'; Kaljumäe (yellow card) 90+6'	Stadium: OmaSP Stadion; Attendance: 1,694; Referee: Petri Viljanen

15 April 2018 2	TPS	0 – 2	SJK	Turku
15:00 EEST (UTC+3)	N.Blomqvist (yellow card) 65'; R.Holma (yellow card) 87'	Report	Vales (yellow card) 39'; Hatakka 88'; Hetemaj 90'	Stadium: Veritas Stadion; Attendance: 794; Referee: Kalle Mäkinen

18 April 2018 3	SJK	0 – 1	HJK	Seinäjoki
18:30 EEST (UTC+3)	Hetemaj (yellow card) 57'	Report	Klauss 33'; Yaghoubi (yellow card) 51'; Obilor (yellow card) 71'	Stadium: OmaSP Stadion; Attendance: 2,110; Referee: Mattias Gestranius

21 April 2018 4	SJK	2 – 0	Honka	Seinäjoki
16:00 EEST (UTC+3)	Klinga 28', 58'; M'Boma (yellow card) 57'; Vales (yellow card) 63'	Report	Rahimi (yellow card) 24'	Stadium: OmaSP Stadion; Attendance: 1,960; Referee: Atte Jussila

29 April 2018 5	Ilves	1 – 1	SJK	Tampere
17:00 EEST (UTC+3)	Noubissi 4'; Thiaw (yellow card) 78'	Report	Ayarna 49'; Dorman (yellow card) 51'; Hambo (yellow card) 70'	Stadium: Tammelan Stadion; Attendance: 3,179; Referee: Mattias Gestranius

3 May 2018 6	SJK	1 – 3	KuPS	Seinäjoki
18:30 EEST (UTC+3)	Hambo 18'; V.Tikkanen (yellow card) 37'; Hatakka (yellow card) 58'; Hetemaj (yellow card) 80' (yellow-red card) 90'; J.Öst (yellow card) 90+4'	Report	Karjalainen 31', 63'; H.Coulibaly (yellow card) 90+2'; U.Nissilä 90+5'	Stadium: OmaSP Stadion; Attendance: 2,009; Referee: Oskari Hämäläinen

7 May 2018 7	Lahti	1 – 0	SJK	Lahti
18:30 EEST (UTC+3)	Anier 88' (pen.)	Report	D.O'Brien (yellow card) 33'; Bååth (yellow card) 45+1'; V.Tikkanen (yellow card) 61'; Hambo (yellow card) 90+2'	Stadium: Lahti Stadium; Attendance: 2,503; Referee: Jari Järvinen

18 May 2018 8	SJK	0 – 1	Inter Turku	Seinäjoki
20:00 EEST (UTC+3)	Hambo (yellow card) 71'; Hetemaj (yellow card) 78'; Hatakka (yellow card) 87'	Report	Furuholm 28'; Mäkitalo (yellow card) 60'	Stadium: OmaSP Stadion; Attendance: 2,015; Referee: Dennis Antamo

26 May 2018 9	SJK	1 – 1	IFK Mariehamn	Seinäjoki
15:00 EEST (UTC+3)	Laaksonen 8'; Bååth (yellow card) 32'; J.Lautamaja (yellow card) 65'; J.Sundman (yellow card) 90+3'	Report	Åsbrink (yellow card) 21'; A.Mäenpää (yellow card) 27'; Kangaskolkka 70'	Stadium: OmaSP Stadion; Attendance: 3,822; Referee: Kalle Mäkinen

29 May 2018 10	HJK	4 – 0	SJK	Helsinki
18:30 EEST (UTC+3)	Alho 7'; Annan (yellow card) 21'; Klauss 68', 70'; E.Vertainen 82'	Report	Ayarna (yellow card) 12'; J.Lautamaja (yellow card) 55'; Hetemaj (yellow card) 66'; D.O'Brien (yellow card) 90+1'	Stadium: Telia 5G -areena Attendance: 3,890; Referee: Jari Järvinen

1 June 2018 11	VPS	1 – 1	SJK	Vaasa
20:00 EEST (UTC+3)	Jama 40'; E-M.Auvinen (yellow card) 60'; Voutilainen (yellow card) 71'; Meerits (yellow card) 86'; David (yellow card) 89'	Report	J.Sundman (yellow card) 11'; Hatakka (yellow card) 12'; Bååth (yellow card) 46'; Laaksonen 61' (pen.); Hambo (yellow card) 81'	Stadium: Hietalahti Stadium; Attendance: 3,928; Referee: Antti Munukka

12 June 2018 12	SJK	4 – 0	TPS	Seinäjoki
18:30 EEST (UTC+3)	Laaksonen 23'; Tendeng 39', 62'; M'Boma 51'	Report		Stadium: OmaSP Stadion; Attendance: 2,516; Referee: Kale Mäkinen

16 June 2018 13	PS Kemi	1 – 0	SJK	Kemi
18:30 EEST (UTC+3)	Lehto (red card) 26'; Tano (yellow card) 27'; Mäkelä 39'; Guevara (yellow card) 45+2'	Report	Hetemaj (yellow card) 27'; Tendeng (yellow card) 53'; J.Lautamaja (yellow card) 58'; M'Boma (yellow card) 69'	Stadium: Sauvosaaren Urheilupuisto; Attendance: 1,344; Referee: Jari Järvinen

20 June 2018 14	Honka	3 – 1	SJK	Espoo
18:30 EEST (UTC+3)	Martín 4'; Kandji 20' (pen.), 76'; El Amrani (yellow card) 33'; Hervás (yellow card) 61'	Report	M'Boma 13' (yellow card) 65'; Bååth (red card) 18'; Tendeng (yellow card) 65'; Laaksonen (yellow card) 66'	Stadium: Tapiolan Urheilupuisto; Attendance: 1,705; Referee: Antti Munukka

26 June 2018 15	SJK	2 – 3	Ilves	Seinäjoki
18:30 EEST (UTC+3)	Ayarna (yellow card) 14'; Hetemaj (yellow card) 29'; M'Boma 53'; Hambo 86'	Report	Noubissi (yellow card) 45' (goal) 54'; Ala-Myllymäki 63'; Thiaw 89' (pen.)	Stadium: OmaSP Stadion; Attendance: 2,466; Referee: Petri Viljanen

30 June 2018 16	KuPS	1 – 1	SJK	Kuopio
15:00 EEST (UTC+3)	Karjalainen 74' (pen.); Murillo (yellow card) 85'; Pennanen (yellow card) 90'; Saxman (yellow card) 90'	Report	Sarajärvi 53'; Sundman (yellow card) 89'	Stadium: Kuopio Football Stadium; Attendance: 1,917; Referee: Mattias Gestranius

4 July 2018 17	SJK	1 – 0	Lahti	Seinäjoki
18:30 EEST (UTC+3)	M'Boma 31'; Laaksonen (yellow card) 43'; Hetemaj (yellow card) 56'; Aksalu (yellow card) 86'	Report	Dmitrijev (yellow card) 90'; Anier (yellow card) 90+1'; Sesay (yellow card) 90+4'	Stadium: OmaSP Stadion; Attendance: 2,377; Referee: Joni Hyytiä

9 July 2018 18	SJK	2 – 1	RoPS	Seinäjoki
18:30 EEST (UTC+3)	Mero (yellow card) 42'; Bååth 63'; Laaksonen 72'	Report	Agnaldo Moraes (yellow card) 87'; Lingman 90+4'	Stadium: OmaSP Stadion; Attendance: 2,814; Referee: Ville Nevalainen

14 July 2018 19	Inter Turku	2 – 0	SJK	Turku
19:00 EEST (UTC+3)	Mäkitalo 1'; Penninkangas 16' (yellow card) 45'; Mansally (yellow card) 22' (yellow-red card) 45+1'; Kamy (yellow card) 73'; Koponen (yellow card) 90'	Report	Hurme (yellow card) 84'	Stadium: Veritas Stadion; Attendance: 1,255; Referee: Jari Järvinen

21 July 2018 20	RoPS	1 – 0	SJK	Rovaniemi
17:00 EEST (UTC+3)	Hämäläinen (yellow card) 59'; Roiha 64' (yellow card) 65'	Report	Hurme (yellow card) 34'; Klinga (yellow card) 68'	Stadium: Rovaniemen keskuskenttä Attendance: 2,439; Referee: Joni Hyytiä

29 July 2018 21	IFK Mariehamn	1 – 0	SJK	Mariehamn
19:00 EEST (UTC+3)	Murnane (yellow card) 45'; Nazari 77'	Report	Mustoe (yellow card) 57'	Stadium: Wiklöf Holding Arena; Attendance: 1,380; Referee: Petri Viljanen

3 August 2018 22	SJK	0 – 0	VPS	Seinäjoki
20:00 EEST (UTC+3)	Opiyo (yellow card) 33'; Klinga (yellow card) 83'; M'Boma (yellow card) 87'	Report	Auvinen (yellow card) 38'; Voutilainen (yellow card) 49'; Vahtera (yellow card) 72'	Stadium: OmaSP Stadion; Attendance: 4,010; Referee: Atte Jussila

11 August 2018 23	VPS	0 – 2	SJK	Vaasa
17:00 EEST (UTC+3)	Volotinen (yellow card) 56'	Report	Hurme (yellow card) 26'; Oliynyk 43', 80'; Dorman (yellow card) 61'; Tendeng (yellow card) 67'; Laaksonen (yellow card) 87'	Stadium: Hietalahti Stadium; Attendance: 2,987; Referee: Petri Viljanen

20 August 2018 24	SJK	2 – 3	Ilves	Seinäjoki
18:30 EEST (UTC+3)	Hurme (yellow card) 31'; Johannes Laaksonen 61'; Winchester 70'	Report	Mettälä 22'; Thiaw 46'; Ala-Myllymäki 58'; Siira (yellow card) 78'	Stadium: OmaSP Stadion; Attendance: 2,752; Referee: Mattias Gestranius

25 August 2018 25	PS Kemi	0 – 0	SJK	Kemi
17:00 EEST (UTC+3)	Lipin (yellow card) 21'; Heinolainen (yellow card) 68' (yellow-red card) 79'; Demiri (yellow card) 71'; Somay (yellow card) 90+3'	Report	Kadio (yellow card) 26'; Hurme (yellow card) 48'	Stadium: Sauvosaaren Urheilupuisto; Attendance: 1,412; Referee: Marko Grönholm

1 September 2018 26	SJK	1 – 2	KuPS	Seinäjoki
17:00 EEST (UTC+3)	Laaksonen 29' (pen.)	Report	Saxman (yellow card) 20'; Karjalainen 61'; Rangel 81'	Stadium: OmaSP Stadion; Attendance: 2,851; Referee: Mohammed Al Emara

13 September 2018 27	SJK	1 – 0	TPS	Seinäjoki
18:30 EEST (UTC+3)	Dorman (yellow card) 33'; Hetemaj 45+2'; Kadio (yellow card) 51'; M'Boma (yellow card) 69'; Winchester (yellow card) 70'	Report	Savić (yellow card) 17'; Tapaninen (yellow card) 74'; Viscosi (yellow card) 90+3'	Stadium: OmaSP Stadion; Attendance: 2,684; Referee: Oskari Hämäläinen

17 September 2018 28	IFK Mariehamn	1 – 0	SJK	Mariehamn
19:00 EEST (UTC+3)	Nazari 19' (pen.); Mattsson (yellow card) 42'; Mantilla (red card) 51'	Report	Hetemaj (yellow card) 20'; Oliynyk (yellow card) 39'; M'Boma (yellow card) 90+2'	Stadium: Wiklöf Holding Arena; Attendance: 1,514; Referee: Jari Järvinen

21 September 2018 29	SJK	0 – 0	Lahti	Seinäjoki
18:30 EEST (UTC+3)	Winchester (yellow card) 82'	Report	Osipov (yellow card) 48'; Gela (yellow card) 60'; Virta (yellow card) 90+3'	Stadium: OmaSP Stadion; Attendance: 2,454; Referee: Joni Hyytiä

30 September 2018 30	RoPS	0 – 1	SJK	Rovaniemi
18:30 EEST (UTC+3)	Kokko (yellow card) 85'	Report	Hetemaj (yellow card) 12'; Oliynyk 19' (yellow card) 26'; Klinga (yellow card) 64'; Hatakka (yellow card) 69'; Hurme (yellow card) 82'; Opiyo (yellow card) 90'	Stadium: Rovaniemen keskuskenttä Attendance: 2,024; Referee: Jari Järvinen

6 October 2018 31	SJK	0 – 1	Honka	Seinäjoki
18:00 EEST (UTC+3)	Dorman (yellow card) 42'; Winchester (yellow card) 83'; Oliynyk (yellow card) 88'	Report	Martín 40'; Murray (yellow card) 40'; Tammilehto (yellow card) 42'	Stadium: OmaSP Stadion; Attendance: 4,556; Referee: Antti Munukka

21 October 2018 32	HJK	1 – 0	SJK	Helsinki
14:30 EEST (UTC+3)	Obilor (yellow card) 45'; Klauss 37'	Report	Oliynyk (yellow card) 40'; Kadio (yellow card) 49'; Sundman (yellow card) 85'	Stadium: Telia 5G -areena Attendance: 5,723; Referee: Dennis Antamo

27 October 2018 33	SJK	2 – 2	Inter Turku	Seinäjoki
15:00 EEST (UTC+3)	M'Boma (yellow card) 24'; Hetemaj 30'; Oliynyk 40'; Opiyo (yellow card) 81'	Report	Mäkitalo (yellow card) 25'; Furuholm 67'; Kamy 89'	Stadium: OmaSP Stadion; Attendance: 2,315; Referee: Petri Viljanen

=== Finnish Cup ===
==== Sixth Round ====
Team	Pld	W	D	L	GF	GA	GD	Pts
SJK	5	4	1	0	12	2	+10	13
VPS	5	3	1	1	16	4	+12	10
KPV	5	2	2	1	13	8	+5	8
FF Jaro	5	2	1	2	13	9	+4	7
TPV	5	1	1	3	4	16	−12	4
PK Keski-Uusimaa	5	0	0	5	1	20	−19	0

21 January 2018 1	SJK	4 – 0	Pallokerho Keski-Uusimaa	Seinäjoki
17:00 EET (UTC+2)	Bååth 39'; M'Boma 62'; Sarajärvi 65'; Hambo 67'	Report		Stadium: WallSport Arena; Attendance: 465; Referee: Juuso Saarela

2 February 2018 2	KPV Kokkola	1 – 2	SJK	Kokkola
19:00 EET (UTC+2)	Poutiainen (yellow card) 27'; Yaroshenko (yellow card) 47' (goal) 67'; Myntti (yellow card) 71'; J.Myllymäki (yellow card) 90+1'	Report	M'Boma 14' (yellow card) 35'; Tendeng 21'; Hurme (yellow card) 90'	Stadium: Kippari Hall; Attendance: 312; Referee: Mikko Juusola

10 February 2018 3	SJK	4 – 0	TPV	Seinäjoki
15:30 EET (UTC+2)	Hambo 1'; Ayarna (yellow card) 21' (goal) 62'; M.Tolonen 54'; Dorman (yellow card) 75'; Malolo 85'	Report	M.Koroma (yellow card) 12'; E.Ek (yellow card) 41'; I.Karimäki (yellow card) 64'; E.Räisänen (yellow card) 75'	Stadium: WallSport Arena; Attendance: 480; Referee: Metsänranta Saarela Juuso

24 February 2018 4	FF Jaro	1 – 1	SJK	Jakobstad
15:00 EET (UTC+2)	S.Jovović (yellow card) 36' (goal) 51'	Report	Hetemaj (yellow card) 19'; Mero (yellow card) 43'; M.Tolonen 53'; Ayarna (yellow card) 57'	Stadium: Tellushallen; Attendance: 504; Referee: Toni Pohjoismäki

2 March 2018 5	SJK	1 – 0	VPS	Seinäjoki
19:00 EET (UTC+2)	Hambo 43'	Report		Stadium: WallSport Arena; Attendance: 500; Referee: Mikko Leino

==== Knockout stage ====
29 March 2018 Quarterfinal	SJK	1 – 2	Honka	Seinäjoki
18:30 EEST (UTC+3)	Hurme (yellow card) 32'; Hetemaj 66'; Hatakka (yellow card) 77'; Hambo (yellow card) 84'; Mustoe (yellow card) 90'	Report	Levänen 14' (yellow card) 18'; Rahimi 33'; Saarinen (yellow card) 80'; Rahimi (yellow card) 88'	Stadium: OmaSp Stadion; Attendance: 899; Referee: Kalle Mäkinen

== Squad statistics ==
As of Match played 27 October 2018

=== Appearances and goals ===
No.	Pos	Nat	Player	Total		Veikkausliiga		Finnish Cup	
No.	Pos	Nat	Player	Apps	Goals	Apps	Goals	Apps	Goals
1	GK	(Finland) FIN	Jesse Öst	16	0	15+1	0	0	0
2	DF	(Finland) FIN	Joel Mero	29	0	21+4	0	4	0
4	DF	(Wales) WAL	Richie Dorman	23	0	15+4	0	3+1	0
5	DF	(Finland) FIN	Dani Hatakka	15	1	7+3	1	5	0
6	DF	(Sweden) SWE	Anders Bååth	34	2	23+5	1	6	1
8	MF	(Finland) FIN	Johannes Laaksonen	29	6	23+5	6	1	0
10	FW	(England) ENG	Billy Ions	8	0	5+3	0	0	0
11	DF	(England) ENG	Jordan Mustoe	23	0	14+7	0	2	0
14	FW	(Finland) FIN	Maximo Tolonen	19	2	8+6	0	4+1	2
15	MF	(Finland) FIN	Matti Klinga	19	2	10+7	2	1+1	0
16	DF	(Finland) FIN	Joonas Sundman	25	0	22+2	0	0+1	0
17	MF	(Finland) FIN	Ville Tikkanen	15	0	11+1	0	3	0
18	DF	(Finland) FIN	Jarkko Hurme	23	0	16+1	0	6	0
19	MF	(Finland) FIN	Obed Malolo	3	1	0	0	1+2	1
21	MF	(Kenya) KEN	Peter Opiyo	13	0	13	0	0	0
22	FW	(Trinidad and Tobago) TTO	Shahdon Winchester	11	1	9+2	1	0	0
23	DF	(Ivory Coast) CIV	Didier Kadio	10	0	10	0	0	0
25	FW	(Senegal) SEN	Emile Paul Tendeng	30	3	19+5	2	5+1	1
26	MF	(Finland) FIN	Jesse Sarajärvi	23	2	12+5	1	2+4	1
27	MF	(Finland) FIN	Joona Lautamaja	13	0	9+4	0	0	0
28	MF	(Ukraine) UKR	Denys Oliynyk	13	4	11+2	4	0	0
29	MF	(England) ENG	Danny O'Brien	9	0	3+6	0	0	0
30	MF	(Brazil) BRA	Marcus Vinicius	1	0	1	0	0	0
33	GK	(Estonia) EST	Mihkel Aksalu	24	0	18	0	6	0
37	FW	(Democratic Republic of the Congo) COD	Aristote M'Boma	33	6	20+7	4	4+2	2
58	MF	(Finland) FIN	Mehmet Hetemaj	28	4	20+2	3	5+1	1
Players from Kerho 07 who appeared:
Players away from the club on loan:
Players who left SJK during the season:
3	DF	(Moldova) MDA	Marc Vales	7	0	6	0	0+1	0
7	MF	(Ghana) GHA	Reuben Ayarna	21	2	16	1	5	1
9	FW	(Finland) FIN	Vahid Hambo	20	5	6+9	2	2+3	3

=== Goal scorers ===
Place	Position	Nation	Number	Name	Veikkausliiga	Finnish Cup	Total
1	MF	(Finland)	8	Johannes Laaksonen	6	0	6
1	FW	(Democratic Republic of the Congo)	37	Aristote M'Boma	4	2	6
3	FW	(Finland)	9	Vahid Hambo	2	3	5
4	MF	(Ukraine)	28	Denys Oliynyk	4	0	4
4	FW	(Finland)	58	Mehmet Hetemaj	3	1	4
6	FW	(Senegal)	25	Emile Paul Tendeng	2	1	3
7	MF	(Finland)	15	Matti Klinga	2	0	2
7	MF	(Ghana)	7	Reuben Ayarna	1	1	2
7	MF	(Finland)	26	Jesse Sarajärvi	1	1	2
7	MF	(Sweden)	6	Anders Bååth	1	1	2
7	FW	(Finland)	14	Maximo Tolonen	0	2	2
11	DF	(Finland)	5	Dani Hatakka	1	0	1
11	FW	(Trinidad and Tobago)	22	Shahdon Winchester	1	0	1
11	MF	(Finland)	19	Obed Malolo	0	1	1
TOTALS					28	13	41

=== Clean sheets ===
Place	Position	Nation	Number	Name	Veikkausliiga	Finnish Cup	Total
1	GK	(Estonia)	33	Mihkel Aksalu	5	3	8
2	GK	(Finland)	1	Jesse Öst	5	0	5
TOTALS					10	3	13

=== Disciplinary record ===
Number	Nation	Position	Name	Veikkausliiga		Finnish Cup		Total	
Number	Nation	Position	Name	Yellow card	Red card	Yellow card	Red card	Yellow card	Red card
1	(Finland)	GK	Jesse Öst	1	0	0	0	1	0
2	(Finland)	DF	Joel Mero	1	0	1	0	2	0
4	(Wales)	DF	Richie Dorman	4	0	1	0	5	0
5	(Finland)	DF	Dani Hatakka	4	0	1	0	5	0
6	(Sweden)	MF	Anders Bååth	3	1	0	0	3	1
8	(Finland)	MF	Johannes Laaksonen	3	0	0	0	3	0
11	(England)	DF	Jordan Mustoe	1	0	1	0	2	0
15	(Finland)	MF	Matti Klinga	3	0	1	0	4	0
16	(Finland)	DF	Joonas Sundman	4	0	0	0	4	0
17	(Finland)	MF	Ville Tikkanen	2	0	0	0	2	0
18	(Finland)	DF	Jarkko Hurme	8	0	2	0	10	0
21	(Kenya)	MF	Peter Opiyo	3	0	0	0	3	0
22	(Trinidad and Tobago)	FW	Shahdon Winchester	3	0	0	0	3	0
23	(Ivory Coast)	DF	Didier Kadio	3	0	0	0	3	0
25	(Senegal)	FW	Emile Paul Tendeng	3	0	0	0	3	0
27	(Finland)	MF	Joona Lautamaja	3	0	0	0	3	0
28	(Ukraine)	MF	Denys Oliynyk	4	0	0	0	4	0
29	(England)	MF	Danny O'Brien	2	0	0	0	2	0
33	(Estonia)	GK	Mihkel Aksalu	1	0	1	0	1	0
37	(Democratic Republic of the Congo)	FW	Aristote M'Boma	7	0	1	0	8	0
58	(Finland)	MF	Mehmet Hetemaj	10	1	1	0	11	1
Players who left SJK during the season:
3	(Moldova)	DF	Marc Vales	2	0	0	0	2	0
7	(Ghana)	MF	Reuben Ayarna	2	0	2	0	4	0
9	(Finland)	FW	Vahid Hambo	4	0	1	0	5	0
TOTALS				81	2	11	0	92	2
