= 2016 Ykkönen =

Ykkönen
- Season: 2016
- Champions: JJK
- Promoted: JJK
- Relegated: KTP; FC Jazz
- Matches: 135
- Goals: 439 (3.25 per match)
- Top goalscorer: Aristote Mboma (18 goals)
- Biggest home win: TPS 6–0 FC Jazz (1 October)
- Biggest away win: FC Jazz 0–4 TPS (29 July)
- Highest scoring: AC Oulu 5–3 EIF (29 May); KTP 5–3 KPV (7 August)

The 2016 Ykkönen was the 45th season of Ykkönen, the second highest football league in Finland. The winning team qualified directly for promotion to the 2017 Veikkausliiga, while the second-placed team had to play a play-off against the eleventh-placed team from Veikkausliiga to decide who wod play in that division. The bottom two teams were relegated to Kakkonen.

== Overview ==
Location of teams in Ykkönen 2015

A total of ten teams contested in the league, including six sides from the 2015 season, FF Jaro and KTP who was relegated from Veikkausliiga and GrIFK and KPV who promoted from Kakkonen after winning the promotion play-offs.

MP and VIFK were relegated from 2015 Ykkönen.

PS Kemi, the champion of 2015 Ykkönen and PK-35 Vantaa, the runner-up of 2015 Ykkönen were promoted to the 2016 Veikkausliiga.

Club	Location	Stadium	Capacity	Manager
AC Oulu	Oulu	Raatin Stadion	6,996	(Finland) Rauno Ojanen
EIF	Raseborg	Ekenäs Centrumplan	2,500	(Finland) Ilkka Marttila
FC Jazz	Pori	Porin Stadion	12,000	(Finland) Jani Uotinen
FF Jaro	Jakobstad	Jakobstads Centralplan	5,000	(England) Kristain Heames
GrIFK	Kauniainen	Kauniaisten Keskuskenttä	700	(Finland) Rami Luomanpää
Haka	Valkeakoski	Tehtaan kenttä	3,516	(Finland) Kari Martonen
JJK	Jyväskylä	Harjun stadion	3,000	(Finland) Juha Pasoja
KPV	Kokkola	Kokkolan Keskuskenttä	2,000	(Finland) Jarmo Korhonen
KTP	Kotka	Arto Tolsa Areena	4,780	(Finland) Ossi Virta
TPS	Turku	Paavo Nurmi Stadium	13,000	(Finland) Mika Laurikainen

=== Managerial changes ===
Team	Outgoing manager	Manner of departure	Date of vacancy	Incoming manager	Date of appointment	Table
EIF	(Finland) Jens Mattfolk	End of contract	n/a	(Finland) Stefan Strömborg	27 November 2015	Pre-season
FF Jaro	(Finland) (Russia) Alexei Eremenko Sr.	Sacked	10 June 2016	(Finland) Niklas Vidjeskog (as caretaker)	10 June 2016	9th
KTP	(Finland) Sami Ristilä	Sacked	30 June 2016	(Finland) Ossi Virta	30 June 2016	8th
FC Jazz	(Wales) John Allen	Mutual termination	20 July 2016	(Finland) Jani Uotinen	21 July 2016	12th
FF Jaro	(Finland) Niklas Vidjeskog	Caretaker	28 July 2016	(England) Kristian Heames	28 July 2016	9th
KPV	(Finland) Antti Ylimäki	Sacked	30 August 2016	(Finland) Jarmo Korhonen	30 August 2016	4th
EIF	(Finland) Stefan Strömborg	Mutual termination	21 September 2016	(Finland) Ilkka Marttila	22 September 2016	7th

== League table ==
Pos	Team	Pld	W	D	L	GF	GA	GD	Pts	Qualification or relegation
1	JJK (C, P)	27	16	4	7	49	38	+11	52	Promotion to Veikkausliiga
2	TPS (Q)	27	16	3	8	60	38	+22	51	Qualification to Promotion playoffs
3	FF Jaro	27	12	8	7	47	33	+14	44	
4	AC Oulu	27	12	7	8	50	31	+19	43	
5	KPV	27	11	6	10	40	43	−3	39	
6	GrIFK	27	11	3	13	33	43	−10	36	
7	Haka	27	8	8	11	43	46	−3	32	
8	EIF	27	10	1	16	36	53	−17	31	
9	KTP (R)	27	6	10	11	47	50	−3	28	Relegation to Kakkonen
10	FC Jazz (R)	27	4	8	15	35	64	−29	20	Relegation to Kakkonen

Source: Suomen Palloliitto
Rules for classification: 1) Points; 2) Goal difference; 3) Number of goals scored
(C) Champions; (P) Promoted; (Q) Qualified for the phase indicated; (R) Relegated

== Results ==
=== Matches 1–18 ===
Home \ Away	ACO	EIF	JAZ	JAR	GRI	HAK	JJK	KPV	KTP	TPS
AC Oulu		5–3	4–1	0–1	3–1	3–1	0–1	3–0	1–0	0–1
EIF	0–2		3–2	1–0	3–0	1–1	1–2	0–2	3–2	0–2
FC Jazz	2–2	1–3		1–1	3–2	1–2	2–2	2–3	3–4	0–4
FF Jaro	1–1	5–0	3–4		2–2	0–0	0–2	0–1	0–1	1–1
GrIFK	1–0	3–2	1–1	2–3		2–1	0–1	1–0	1–1	1–0
Haka	2–2	2–0	2–0	1–1	3–0		3–2	0–3	2–2	2–1
JJK	0–3	3–0	2–0	1–1	1–0	3–2		3–0	3–0	2–0
KPV	2–2	2–0	3–3	0–3	3–0	1–4	2–1		1–0	2–3
KTP	1–1	1–2	1–0	1–2	1–2	3–3	1–1	5–3		3–3
TPS	3–1	2–1	5–1	1–4	2–0	2–0	5–1	2–1	2–5	

Source: Suomen Palloliitto
Legend: Blue = home team win; Yellow = draw; Red = away team win.

=== Matches 19–27 ===
Home \ Away	ACO	EIF	JAZ	JAR	GRI	HAK	JJK	KPV	KTP	TPS
AC Oulu		4–1	2–2	0–3	3–0					0–1
EIF			1–2	1–2	2–0	2–1				
FC Jazz						1–0	1–2	1–1	1–1	
FF Jaro			2–0		2–4	3–0		0–0	3–1	3–2
GrIFK			2–0			1–0			2–0	1–2
Haka	1–1						2–4	3–2		1–2
JJK	2–1	1–3		3–1	4–2			0–1		
KPV	0–0	3–2			0–2				1–1	
KTP	1–4	0–1		1–1		3–3	5–0			
TPS		3–0	6–0				2–2	2–3	1–3	

Source: Suomen Palloliitto
Legend: Blue = home team win; Yellow = draw; Red = away team win.

== Statistics ==
=== Top scorers ===
Source: palloliitto.fi (in Finnish)

As of 15 October 2016.

Rank	Player	Club	Goals
1	(Finland) Aristote Mboma	AC Oulu	17
2	(Finland) Jussi Aalto	KTP	14
2	(Finland) Mikko Hyyrynen	TPS	14
2	(Georgia (country)) Irakli Sirbiladze	KPV	14
5	(Finland) Ilari Mettälä	TPS	12
6	(Finland) Elias Ahde	FC Jazz / Haka	11
7	(Serbia) Saša Jovović	EIF	10
7	(Mexico) Alberto Alvarado Morín	FF Jaro	10
9	(Spain) Daniel Sánchez	FC Jazz	9
10	7 players		8
17	3 players		7
20	5 players		6
25	7 players		5
32	8 players		4
40	13 players		3
53	26 players		2
79	34 players		1

== See also ==
- 2016 Veikkausliiga
