= Frans Grönlund =

Finnish footballer (born 2000)

Personal information
- Date of birth: 26 March 2000 (age 26)
- Place of birth: Finland
- Height: 1.88 m (6 ft 2 in)
- Position: Centre back

Team information
- Current team: ÅIFK

Youth career
- –2018: Inter Turku

Senior career*
Years	Team	Apps	(Gls)
2017–2018	Inter Turku II	8	(0)
2019	PIF	23	(5)
2020	IFK Mariehamn	4	(1)
2020–2022	PIF	52	(2)
2023–2024	SalPa	44	(1)
2025–	ÅIFK	0	(0)
- * Club domestic league appearances and goals as of 26 October 2024

Frans Grönlund (born 26 March 2000) is a Finnish professional footballer who plays as a centre back for Åbo IFK.

== Club career ==
Grönlund started football in Turun Nappulaliiga. He played in the youth sector of Inter Turku, and made his senior debut with the club's reserve team in 2017. After one season with Pargas IF in 2019, he joined Veikkausliiga club IFK Mariehamn in January 2020. He returned to PIF in September.

Since 2023, he has played for Salon Palloilijat (SalPa) in Finnish second-tier.
