= Saliw Babawo =

Ghanaian footballer

Personal information
- Date of birth: 3 March 1999 (age 27)
- Place of birth: Ghana
- Position: Midfielder

Youth career
- Ho Hot Steel

Senior career*
Years	Team	Apps	(Gls)
2014–2016	Spartans FC		
2016	→ Sekondi Hasaacas (loan)	22	(3)
2017–2019	Dinamo Brest	11	(0)
2020–2021	PIF	26	(9)
2023–	Buffles		

International career
- Ghana U20
- * Club domestic league appearances and goals as of 31 December 2021

Saliw Babawo (born 3 March 1999) is a Ghanaian professional footballer who plays as a midfielder.

== Career statistics ==
As of 21 March 2025

Appearances and goals by club, season and competition
Club	Season	League			National cup (Note: Includes Belarusian Cup and Suomen Cup)		Continental		Other		Total	
Club	Season	Division	Apps	Goals	Apps	Goals	Apps	Goals	Apps	Goals	Apps	Goals
Sekondi Hasaacas (loan)	2016	Ghana Premier League	22	3	–		–		–		22	3
Dynamo Brest	2017	Belarusian Premier League	8	0	2	0	0	0	–		10	0
Dynamo Brest	2018	Belarusian Premier League	0	0	1	0	1	0	–		2	0
Dynamo Brest	2019	Belarusian Premier League	3	0	2	2	–		–		11	2
Dynamo Brest	Total		11	0	5	2	1	0	0	0	17	2
Pargas IF	2020	Kakkonen	5	2	–		–		–		5	2
Pargas IF	2021	Kakkonen	21	7	1	0	–		–		22	7
Pargas IF	Total		26	9	1	0	0	0	0	0	27	9
Career total			59	12	6	2	1	0	0	0	66	14
