= Jordan Mustoe =

English footballer (born 1991)

Personal information
- Full name: Jordan David Mustoe
- Date of birth: 28 January 1991 (age 35)
- Place of birth: Birkenhead, England
- Height: 5 ft 11 in (1.80 m)
- Position: Left back

Youth career
- Liverpool
- –2011: Wigan Athletic

Senior career*
Years	Team	Apps	(Gls)
2011–2014	Wigan Athletic	0	(0)
2012	→ Barnet (loan)	18	(0)
2012–2013	→ Morecambe (loan)	11	(0)
2013	→ Carlisle United (loan)	14	(1)
2013	→ Bury (loan)	6	(0)
2014	→ Wycombe Wanderers (loan)	3	(0)
2014	→ Morecambe (loan)	5	(0)
2014	Accrington Stanley	4	(0)
2015–2017	Westerlo	46	(0)
2018	SJK	21	(0)
2019	Dinamo București	3	(0)
2019–2020	Al-Nasr		
2021–2022	Patro Eisden	6	(0)
2021	→ Finn Harps (loan)	16	(2)
2022–2023	Warrington Rylands	31	(2)
2023	Darlington	8	(0)
2024	Litherland REMYCA	0	(0)
2024	Warrington Rylands	0	(0)
- * Club domestic league appearances and goals as of May 2024

Jordan David Mustoe (born 28 January 1991) is an English footballer who plays as a left back. He played in the Football League and in the top divisions of Belgium, Finland, Romania, Oman and Ireland before returning to English non-league football in 2022.

== Career ==
=== Wigan Athletic ===
Born in Birkenhead, Merseyside, Mustoe started his career as a youth player at Liverpool, but was not retained. He then joined Wigan Athletic, and signed his first professional contract with the club in 2009.

He made his first-team debut, coming on as a substitute, in an FA Cup match against Hull City on 8 January 2011, which Wigan won 3–2. After the match, Manager Roberto Martínez spoke out about their debut performances. made his first start for Wigan in another FA Cup match, against Swindon Town on 7 January 2012. After the match, Mustoe expressed his mixed emotions to make his first start and the results.

In July 2013, the club opted to take up their option of a contract extension on Mustoe to stay for another season. However, after five years at the club, Mustoe was among five players to be released when their contract expired at the end of the 2013–14 season.

==== Loan moves ====
On 30 January 2012, he joined Barnet on loan for the rest of the season. He made his debut on 7 February, in a 1–0 defeat to Swindon. In the last game of the season against Burton Albion, Mustoe provided assist for Mark Byrne to score the opening goal in the 6th minute. Barnet would go on to win the game 2–1, thus maintaining their Football League status. Mustoe went on to make eighteen appearances for the club and returned to his parent club.

He signed on loan for Morecambe on 8 October 2012. He scored on his debut two days later, a 4–2 defeat to Preston North End in the second round of the Football League Trophy. His loan finished on 12 November after the 4–1 defeat of his former club, Barnet. The loan was extended on 20 November, allowing for Mustoe to remain on loan until 1 January 2013. Mustoe made fourteen appearances for the club before returning to his parent club on 2 January 2013.

On 21 February 2013, it was announced that Mustoe was to sign for Carlisle United on loan until the end of the 2012–13 season. Mustoe made his league debut for the club two days later, playing as a left-back in a 1–1 draw against MK Dons. Mustoe then scored his first goal for the club in a 2–1 win over Oldham Athletic on 6 April 2013, and provided the assist for Liam Noble in the next game, a 2–0 win over Doncaster Rovers. He made a total of 14 appearances during his time at Brunton Park, scoring one goal.

On 1 October 2013, Mustoe joined League Two club Bury on a month's loan. Mustoe made his debut four days later, on 5 October 2013, playing as a left-back, in a 0–0 draw against Newport County. After making six appearances, it announced that Mustoe returned to Wigan.

On 17 January 2014, Mustoe joined Wycombe Wanderers on a one-month loan deal. Mustoe made his Wycombe Wanderers debut on 25 January 2014, playing as a left-back position, in a 2–2 draw against Mansfield Town. Mustoe went on to make three more appearances before returning to his parent club on 18 February 2014.

On 27 March 2014, Mustoe joined League Two club Morecambe on loan until the end of the 2013–14 season. Mustoe then re-debut for the club on 5 April 2014, coming on as a substitute in a late minutes, as Morecambe loss 1–0 against Mansfield Town. After making five appearances for the club.

=== Accrington Stanley ===
After being released by Wigan, it announced on 11 August 2014 that Mustoe joined Accrington Stanley on a short-term contract, having previously played in the pre-season friendly. Five days later after signing for the club, Mustoe made his Accrrington Stanley debut, playing as a left midfield position, in a 2–1 loss against Cheltenham Town. However, Mustoe was released by the club despite being in the first team regular with four appearances.

=== Westerlo ===
After three months without a club, Mustoe moved abroad for the first time by joining Belgian Pro League side Westerlo on a one-year contract with option to extend.

Mustoe made his Westerlo debut two days later, playing in the left-back position, in a 1–1 draw against Standard Liège. But then, Mustoe was then sent off after a foul on Thomas Foket in a 2–1 loss against Gent on 7 February 2015 and was banned for two match. Mustoe then provided assist for Mohammed Aoulad, in a 3–0 win over Oostende on 28 February 2015. On 25 March 2015, Mustoe signed a contract extension for one season.

On 18 July 2017 played for Grimsby Town on trial in a friendly against Bideford.

=== SJK ===
On 22 December 2017, Mustoe signed a one-year contract with Finnish Veikkausliiga club Seinäjoen Jalkapallokerho.

=== Dinamo București ===
On 15 January 2019, Mustoe joined Liga I side Dinamo București. His time in Romania was brief as he was released on 26 March 2019 after only making 3 appearances for the club.

=== Al-Nasr ===
On 13 September 2019, Mustoe joined Oman Professional League side Al-Nasr for the 2019–20 season.

=== Later career ===
On 31 October 2020, Mustoe agreed a deal to return to Belgium, joining Belgian National Division 1 side Patro Eisden from January 2021. After the Belgian season was cancelled due to coronavirus, Mustoe joined Finn Harps on loan for the 2021 season before returning to Belgium.

Mustoe returned to English football after eight years away when he signed for Warrington Rylands in August 2022.

In July 2023, Mustoe signed for National League North club Darlington. He was ever-present in the first seven matches of the season, but did not appear after Josh Gowling replaced Alun Armstrong as manager in mid-September, and his contract was cancelled by mutual consent on 29 November.

He joined North West Counties Premier Division club Litherland REMYCA in January 2024, but made no league appearances. He then rejoined his former club Warrington Rylands, but was sent off in a Liverpool Senior Cup tie and again, made no league appearances.

== Career statistics ==
=== Club ===
As of match played 25 November 2023

Appearances and goals by club, season and competition
Club	Season	League			National cup		League cup		Other		Total	
Club	Season	Division	Apps	Goals	Apps	Goals	Apps	Goals	Apps	Goals	Apps	Goals
Wigan Athletic	2010–11	Premier League	0	0	1	0	0	0	–		1	0
Wigan Athletic	2011–12	Premier League	0	0	1	0	0	0	–		1	0
Wigan Athletic	2012–13	Premier League	0	0	2	0	0	0	–		2	0
Wigan Athletic	2013–14	Championship	0	0	0	0	0	0	0	0	0	0
Wigan Athletic	Total		0	0	4	0	0	0	0	0	4	0
Barnet (loan)	2011–12	League Two	18	0	0	0	0	0	1 (Note: Appearance(s) in Football League Trophy)	0	19	0
Morecambe (loan)	2012–13	League Two	11	0	0	0	0	0	1	1	12	1
Carlisle United (loan)	2012–13	League One	14	1	0	0	0	0	0	0	14	1
Bury (loan)	2013–14	League One	6	0	0	0	0	0	0	0	6	0
Wycombe Wanderers (loan)	2013–14	League Two	3	0	0	0	0	0	0	0	3	0
Morecambe (loan)	2013–14	League Two	5	0	0	0	0	0	0	0	5	0
Accrington Stanley	2014–15	League Two	4	0	0	0	1	0	1	0	6	0
Westerlo	2014–15	Belgian Pro League	14	0	0	0	—		—		14	0
Westerlo	2015–16	Belgian Pro League	18	0	1	0	—		—		19	0
Westerlo	2016–17	Belgian Pro League	14	0	0	0	—		—		14	0
Westerlo	Total		46	0	1	0	—		—		47	0
SJK	2018	Veikkausliiga	21	0	2	0	—		—		23	0
Dinamo București	2018–19	Liga I	3	0	0	0	—		—		3	0
Al-Nasr	2019–20	Oman Professional League	No data currently available									
Patro Eisden	2020–21	Belgian National Division 1	0	0	0	0	—		—		0	0
Patro Eisden	2021–22	Belgian National Division 1	6	0	0	0	—		—		6	0
Patro Eisden	Total		6	0	0	0	—		—		6	0
Finn Harps (loan)	2021	League of Ireland Premier Division	16	2	3	0	—		–		19	2
Warrington Rylands	2022–23	NPL Premier Division	31	2	1	0	—		2	0	34	2
Darlington	2022–23	National League North	8	0	1	0	—		0	0	9	0
Career total			192	5	12	0	1	0	5	1	210	6
