= Danny O'Brien (footballer, born 1996) =

English footballer

Personal information
- Full name: Daniel William O'Brien
- Date of birth: 12 March 1996 (age 30)
- Place of birth: Leigh, England
- Position: Midfielder

Team information
- Current team: Skelmersdale United

Youth career
- –2015: Aston Villa
- 2015–2016: Wigan Athletic

Senior career*
| Years | Team | Apps | (Gls) |
| 2015–2017 | Wigan Athletic | 0 | (0) |
| 2015 | → Wrexham (loan) | 2 | (0) |
| 2016 | → Chester (loan) | 9 | (1) |
| 2017 | → Chester (loan) | 4 | (0) |
| 2017 | Kraft | 18 | (7) |
| 2018 | SJK Akatemia | 13 | (11) |
| 2018 | SJK | 9 | (0) |
| 2018–2019 | Alfreton Town | 9 | (1) |
| 2019 | Curzon Ashton | 0 | (0) |
| 2019 | Hyde United | 9 | (3) |
| 2019–2020 | Atherton Collieries | 13 | (1) |
| 2020 | Clitheroe | 0 | (0) |
| 2020–2022 | Ramsbottom United | 14 | (2) |
| 2022–2023 | Bury | 39 | (4) |
| 2023 | Skelmersdale United (dual registration) | 15 | (0) |

International career
| 2012 | England U17 | | |
- * Club domestic league appearances and goals as of 13:31, 11 October 2019 (UTC)

Danny O'Brien (born 12 March 1996) is an English professional footballer who plays as a midfielder for Skelmersdale United.

== Club career ==
O'Brien started his career at Aston Villa where he made the bench on several occasions as the youth side won the NextGen Series in 2013. He then joined Wigan Athletic where he had loan spells at Wrexham and Chester. On 9 August 2016, he made his senior debut for Wigan in the EFL Cup as an 87th minute substitute in a 2–1 loss to Oldham Athletic. In April 2017, O'Brien joined Finnish third-tier club Kraft. In February 2018, O'Brien joined Veikkausliiga side SJK, initially to play for their U23 side, SJK Akatemia. On 3 May 2018, O'Brien made his debut for SJK's senior side as a 79th minute substitute in a 3–1 loss to KuPS. On 30 November 2018, O'Brien joined National League North side Alfreton Town on a deal until the end of the season.

On 1 June 2019, O'Brien signed for fellow National League North side Curzon Ashton. However, before making an appearance for Curzon, O'Brien joined Northern Premier League side Hyde United. On 11 October 2019, after six appearances with Hyde, O'Brien joined fellow Northern Premier League side Atherton Collieries.

== Career statistics ==
As of 8 April 2024

Appearances and goals by club, season and competition
| Club | Season | League | | | National Cup | | League Cup | | Other | | Total | |
| Club | Season | Division | Apps | Goals | Apps | Goals | Apps | Goals | Apps | Goals | Apps | Goals |
|---|---|---|---|---|---|---|---|---|---|---|---|---|
| Wigan Athletic | 2015–16 | League One | 0 | 0 | 0 | 0 | 0 | 0 | 0 | 0 | 0 | 0 |
| Wigan Athletic | 2015–16 | Championship | 0 | 0 | 0 | 0 | 1 | 0 | 0 | 0 | 1 | 0 |
| Wigan Athletic | Total | | 0 | 0 | 0 | 0 | 1 | 0 | 0 | 0 | 1 | 0 |
| Wrexham (loan) | 2015–16 | National League | 2 | 0 | 0 | 0 | — | | 1 (Note: Appearance(s) in FA Trophy) | 0 | 3 | 0 |
| Chester (loan) | 2015–16 | National League | 9 | 1 | 0 | 0 | — | | 1 (Note: Appearance(s) in Cheshire Senior Cup) | 0 | 10 | 1 |
| Chester (loan) | 2016–17 | National League | 4 | 0 | 0 | 0 | — | | 0 | 0 | 4 | 0 |
| Chester (loan) | Total | | 13 | 1 | 0 | 0 | 0 | 0 | 1 | 0 | 14 | 1 |
| Kraft | 2017 | Kakkonen | 18 | 7 | 0 | 0 | 0 | 0 | 0 | 0 | 18 | 7 |
| SJK Akatemia | 2018 | Kakkonen | 13 | 11 | 0 | 0 | 0 | 0 | 0 | 0 | 13 | 11 |
| SJK | 2018 | Veikkausliiga | 9 | 0 | 0 | 0 | 0 | 0 | 0 | 0 | 9 | 0 |
| Alfreton Town | 2018–19 | National League North | 9 | 1 | 0 | 0 | — | | 0 | 0 | 9 | 1 |
| Curzon Ashton | 2019–20 | National League North | 0 | 0 | 0 | 0 | — | | 0 | 0 | 0 | 0 |
| Hyde United | 2019–20 | NPL Premier Division | 9 | 3 | 1 | 0 | — | | 0 | 0 | 10 | 3 |
| Atherton Collieries | 2019–20 | NPL Premier Division | 13 | 1 | — | | — | | 4 | 0 | 17 | 1 |
| Clitheroe | 2020–21 | NPL Division One North West | 0 | 0 | — | | — | | 0 | 0 | 0 | 0 |
| Ramsbottom United | 2020–21 | NPL Division One North West | 8 | 2 | 2 | 1 | — | | 2 | 0 | 12 | 3 |
| Ramsbottom United | 2021–22 | NPL Division One West | 6 | 0 | 1 | 0 | — | | 0 | 0 | 7 | 0 |
| Ramsbottom United | Total | | 14 | 2 | 3 | 1 | — | | 2 | 0 | 19 | 3 |
| Bury | 2021–22 | NWCFL Division One North | 24 | 4 | — | | 3 | 0 | 3 (Note: Two appearances in FA Vase, one appearance in First Division Challenge Cup) | 0 | 30 | 4 |
| Bury | 2022–23 | NWCFL Premier Division | 15 | 0 | 4 | 0 | 2 | 0 | 1 (Note: Appearance(s) in Manchester Premier Cup) | 0 | 22 | 0 |
| Bury | Total | | 39 | 4 | 4 | 0 | 5 | 0 | 4 | 0 | 52 | 4 |
| Skelmersdale United (dual reg) | 2022–23 | NPL Division One West | 15 | 0 | — | | — | | 0 | 0 | 15 | 0 |
| Career total | | | 154 | 30 | 8 | 1 | 6 | 0 | 12 | 0 | 180 | 31 |

== International career ==
O'Brien has played for England U17s.
