= Samu Volotinen =

Finnish footballer (born 1998)

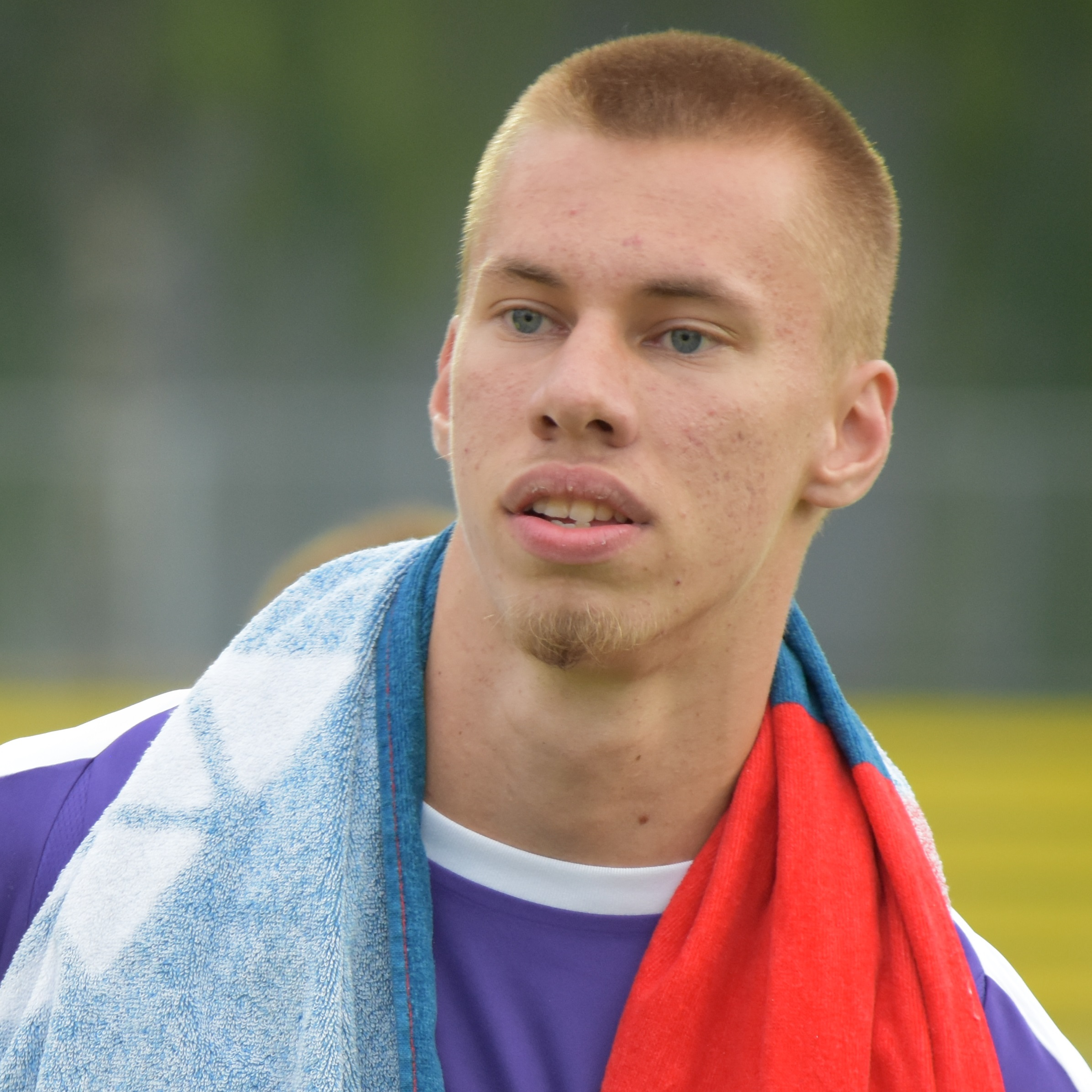
- Volotinen with VPS in 2018.

Personal information
- Date of birth: 26 August 1998 (age 28)
- Place of birth: Vantaa, Finland
- Height: 1.93 m (6 ft 4 in)
- Position: Goalkeeper

Team information
- Current team: PK Keski-Uusimaa
- Number: 1

Youth career
- VJS/Akatemia
- PK-35 Vantaa

Senior career*
Years	Team	Apps	(Gls)
2015–2016	PK-35 Vantaa	9	(0)
2017–2018	VPS	22	(0)
2019	Čelik Zenica	0	(0)
2019–2020	Apollon Limassol	0	(0)
2021–2022	IF Gnistan	18	(0)
2022	→ Pargas IF (loan)	2	(0)
2023	SalPa	0	(0)
2024–	PK Keski-Uusimaa	11	(0)
- * Club domestic league appearances and goals as of 27 January 2025

Samu Volotinen (born 26 August 1998) is a Finnish professional footballer who plays as a goalkeeper for PK Keski-Uusimaa.

== Career ==
Volotinen spent his early career in Finland with PK-35 Vantaa and VPS. In December 2018 he signed for Bosnian club Čelik Zenica. The deal was officially confirmed on 12 January 2019. On 20 February 2019 the club announced that Volotinen would not be part of the registered squad due to the Bosnian league's restrictions on the number of foreign players, and they instead planned to bring foreign players to other positions.

In June 2019 he signed for Cypriot First Division club Apollon Limassol.

In January 2021 he returned to Finland, signing with IF Gnistan, signing a new contract with the club in December 2021.
