= Daniel Kamy =

Cameroonian footballer (born 1996)

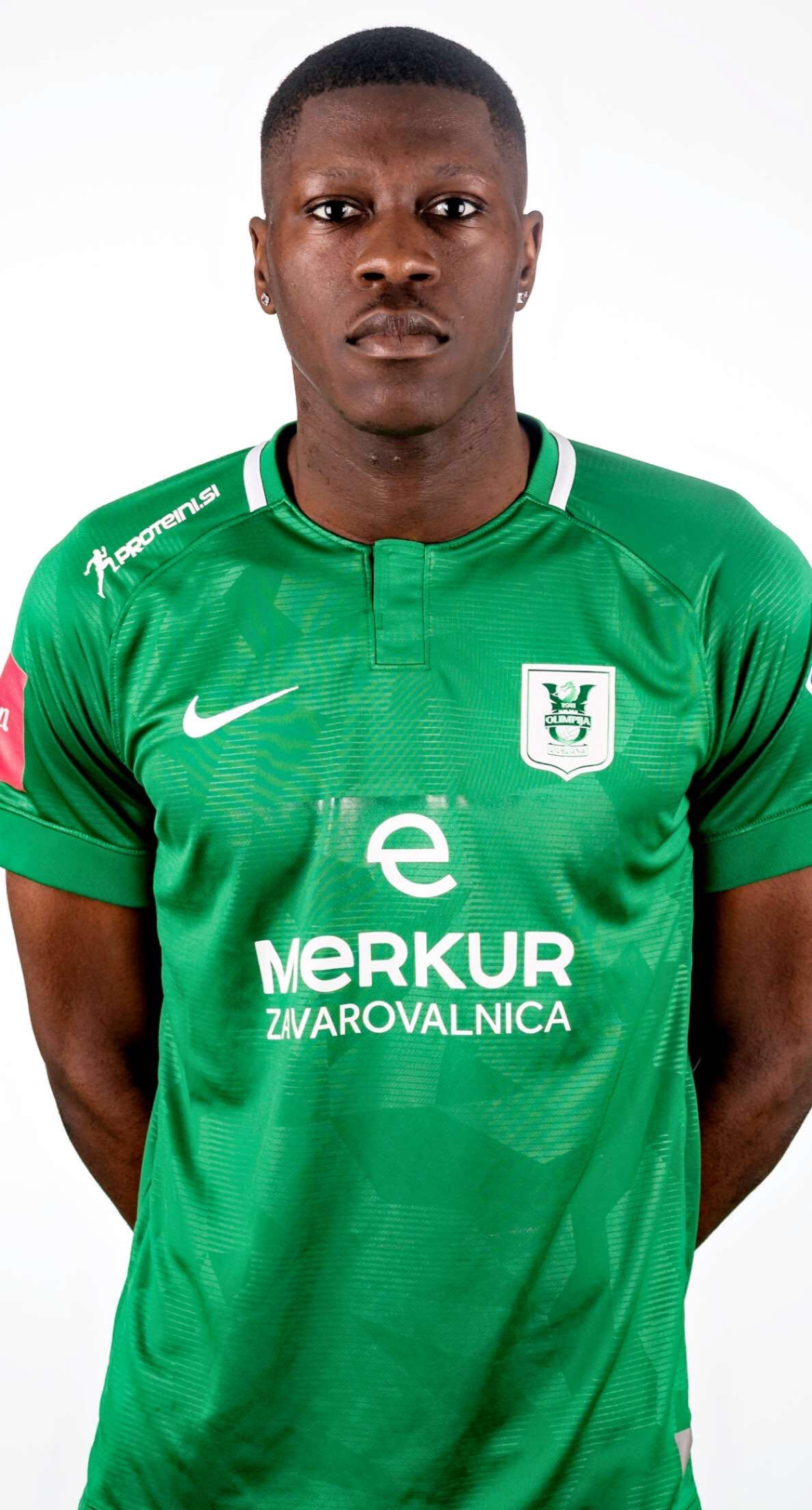
- Kamy with Olimpija Ljubljana

Personal information
- Full name: Daniel Kamy Ntankeu Yves
- Date of birth: 8 March 1996 (age 30)
- Place of birth: Yaoundé, Cameroon
- Height: 1.93 m (6 ft 4 in)
- Position: Defender

Youth career
- Ulnar
- L'Académie Epinal
- L'Entente SSG

Senior career*
Years	Team	Apps	(Gls)
2015–2016	Bosna Visoko	14	(0)
2016–2018	Dečić	16	(0)
2018–2019	Inter Turku	25	(3)
2020–2021	Olimpija Ljubljana	8	(1)
2021	Inđija	9	(0)
2022	Royal FC Mandel United	13	(0)
2022–2023	P.A.O. Rouf	20	(0)
2023–2024	Lokomotiv Sofia	12	(1)
2024–2025	Newroz	16	(0)
2025	Al Ansar	1	(0)

International career
2017	Cameroon U23		
- * Club domestic league appearances and goals as of 14:32, 28 June 2024 (UTC)

Daniel Kamy Ntankeu Yves (born 8 March 1996) is a Cameroonian professional footballer who plays as a defender.

== Early and personal life ==
Kamy was born in Yaoundé, Cameroon and raised in France. He holds dual Cameroonian-French nationality.

== Club career ==
Kamy played youth football for French clubs Ulnay, L'Académie Épinay and L'Entente SSG. He began his senior career in Bosnia with Bosna Visoko.

Kamy moved from Montenegrin club Dečić to Finnish club Inter Turku in January 2018.

Kamy joined Olimpija Ljubljana on 13 February 2020. He was released by the club on 1 February 2021.

He then played for Inđija, Royal FC Mandel United and P.A.O. Rouf.

Kamy joined Lokomotiv Sofia on 2 July 2023.

In March 2025, Daniel Kamy joined Lebanese Premier League club Al Ansar FC.

== International career ==
Kamy was a Cameroon U23 squad member at the 2017 Islamic Solidarity Games.

== Career statistics ==
As of 14 March 2025

Appearances and goals by club, season and competition
Club	Season	League			Cup (Note: Includes Montenegrin Cup, Suomen Cup and Bulgarian Cup)		Other		Total	
Club	Season	Division	Apps	Goals	Apps	Goals	Apps	Goals	Apps	Goals
Bosna Visoko	2015–16	First League of FBiH	14	0	–		–		14	0
Dečić	2016–17	Montenegrin First League	11	0	1	0	–		12	0
Dečić	2017–18	Montenegrin First League	5	0	–		–		5	0
Dečić	Total		16	0	1	0	0	0	17	0
Inter Turku	2018	Veikkausliiga	16	2	3	0	–		19	2
Inter Turku	2019	Veikkausliiga	9	1	3	0	0	0	12	1
Inter Turku	Total		25	3	6	0	0	0	31	3
Olimpija Ljubljana	2019–20	Slovenian PrvaLiga	8	1	0	0	–		8	1
Inđija	2020–21	Serbian SuperLiga	9	0	0	0	–		9	0
Royal FC Mandel United	2021–22	Belgian Division 1	13	0	0	0	4	0	17	0
P.A.O. Rouf	2022–23	Super League Greece 2	20	0	0	0	–		20	0
Lokomotiv Sofia	2023–24	Bulgarian First League	12	1	1	0	–		13	1
Newroz	2024–25	Iraq Stars League	16	0	–		–		16	0
Career total			133	5	8	0	4	0	145	5
