= Pargas Idrottsförening =

Finnish sports club

Pargas IF
- Nicknames: PIF, Piffen
- Founded: 1914
- Ground: Pajbacka, Pargas
- Chairman: Petra Furu
- Manager: Stefan Strömborg
- League: Kakkonen
- 2022: 12th in Ykkonen ▼
Home colours	Away colours

Pargas Idrottsförening, or PIF for short, is a sports club based in the city of Pargas, Finland. The club has over 1,500 members and is known, especially for handball, football, and orienteering. It also makes provision for cross-country skiing, floorball, gymnastics, and athletics. The club was founded in 1914 as Pargas Malms Idrottsförening but changed its name to its current title in 1916.

== Football ==
PIF played their first official match in 1916, their opponents being the Kimito based club Wrethalla and the match ended in a 2- 2 draw. In 1994 the club played one season in the Ykkönen, the second tier of the Finnish football system. They also have experienced two other seasons at the same level back in 1939 and 1948. Their records indicate that the club have had three spells in the Kakkonen (Second Division) in 1990–93, 1995 and 2000–06. At the end of the 2006 season they were relegated to the Kolmonen where they currently reside. In addition, PIF has played two seasons at the highest level in Futsal in Finland,

PIF is the youth club of Finnish international and former Charlton and Rangers player Jonatan "Tintin" Johansson, who has now returned to Turun Palloseura.

== Current squad ==
As of 17 September 2020

Note: Flags indicate national team as defined under FIFA eligibility rules; some limited exceptions apply. Players may hold more than one non-FIFA nationality.

No.	Pos.	Nation	Player
1	GK	FIN	Arnold Uschanoff
3	DF	FIN	Wille Öhman
4	MF	FIN	Kristoffer Lövholm
6	MF	FIN	Matias Lahti
7	MF	FIN	Behar Cimili
8	DF	FIN	Ville Ranta-Aho
9	FW	FIN	Emil Peltonen
10	FW	FIN	Gezim Voca
12	GK	FIN	Rasmus Knuts
14	FW	FIN	Allan Andersson
15	DF	FIN	Roni Järvinen
17	FW	FIN	Ted Rosenström
18	MF	FIN	Viktor Johansson

No.	Pos.	Nation	Player
19	MF	GHA	Saliw Babawo
20	MF	IRQ	Yasser Al-Musawi
21	DF	FIN	Paulus Kopperoinen
22	DF	FIN	Lukas Eloranta
23	DF	FIN	John Adolfsson
24	FW	FIN	Kasper Fröjdö
25	MF	FIN	Tomas Hradecký
26	MF	FIN	Casper Nyberg
27	MF	FIN	Samir Achkir
28	FW	FIN	Elias Untamala
29	MF	FIN	Niklas Rantanen
77	DF	FIN	Arsalan Azizi
—	DF	FIN	Frans Grönlund

=== Season to season ===
Season	Level	Division	Section	Administration	Position	Movements
1938	Tier 3	Maakuntasarja (Third Division)		Finnish FA (Suomen Palloliitto)		
1939	Tier 2	Itä-Länsi-sarja (Second Division)	West League, Group 2	Finnish FA (Suomen Palloliitto)	3rd	
1940	Unknown					
1940–41	Tier 3	C-Sarja (Third Division)	Group 1	Finnish FA (Suomen Palloliitto)	2nd	
1942–44	Unknown					
1945–46	Tier 3	SPL Maakuntasarja (Third Division)	South-West Finland Group	Finnish FA (Suomen Palloliitto)	2nd	
1946–47	Tier 3	SPL Maakuntasarja (Third Division)	South-West Finland Group	Finnish FA (Suomen Palloliitto)	2nd	
1947–48	Tier 3	SPL Maakuntasarja (Third Division)	South-West Finland Group	Finnish FA (Suomen Palloliitto)	1st	Promoted
1948	Tier 2	Suomensarja (Second Division)	South Group	Finnish FA (Suomen Palloliitto)	14th	Relegated
1949	Tier 3	Maakuntasarja (Third Division)	West Group B	Finnish FA (Suomen Palloliitto)	3rd	
1950	Tier 3	Maakuntasarja (Third Division)	South Group B	Finnish FA (Suomen Palloliitto)	4th	
1951	Tier 3	Maakuntasarja (Third Division)	West Group II	Finnish FA (Suomen Palloliitto)	4th	
1952	Tier 3	Maakuntasarja (Third Division)	West Group A	Finnish FA (Suomen Palloliitto)	6th	
1953	Tier 3	Maakuntasarja (Third Division)	West Group A	Finnish FA (Suomen Palloliitto)	4th	
1954	Tier 3	Maakuntasarja (Third Division)	West Group II	Finnish FA (Suomen Palloliitto)	5th	
1955	Tier 3	Maakuntasarja (Third Division)	West Group I	Finnish FA (Suomen Palloliitto)	5th	
1956	Tier 3	Maakuntasarja (Third Division)	West Group II	Finnish FA (Suomen Palloliitto)	8th	Relegated
1957	Tier 4	Aluesarja (Fourth Division)	Group 4	Finnish FA (Suomen Palloliitto)	1st	Promoted
1958	Tier 3	Maakuntasarja (Third Division)	Group 3	Finnish FA (Suomen Palloliitto)	9th	Relegated
1959	Tier 4	Aluesarja (Fourth Division)	Group 4	Finnish FA (Suomen Palloliitto)	2nd	Promoted
1960	Tier 3	Maakuntasarja (Third Division)	Group 3	Finnish FA (Suomen Palloliitto)	5th	
1961	Tier 3	Maakuntasarja (Third Division)	Group 2	Finnish FA (Suomen Palloliitto)	3rd	
1962	Tier 3	Maakuntasarja (Third Division)	Group 2	Finnish FA (Suomen Palloliitto)	4th	
1963	Tier 3	Maakuntasarja (Third Division)	Group 2	Finnish FA (Suomen Palloliitto)	7th	Relegation Playoff
1964	Tier 3	Maakuntasarja (Third Division)	Group 3	Finnish FA (Suomen Palloliitto)	6th	Relegated
1965	Tier 4	Aluesarja (Fourth Division)	Group 4	Finnish FA (Suomen Palloliitto)	5th	
1966	Tier 4	Aluesarja (Fourth Division)	Group 5	Finnish FA (Suomen Palloliitto)	3rd	
1967	Tier 4	Aluesarja (Fourth Division)	Group 4	Finnish FA (Suomen Palloliitto)	1st	Promoted
1968	Tier 3	Maakuntasarja (Third Division)	Group 3	Finnish FA (Suomen Palloliitto)	9th	Relegated
1969	Tier 4	Aluesarja (Fourth Division)	Group 4	Finnish FA (Suomen Palloliitto)	1st	Promoted
1970	Tier 3	III Divisioona (Third Division)	Group 2	Finnish FA (Suomen Palloliitto)	8th	
1971	Tier 3	III Divisioona (Third Division)	Group 2	Finnish FA (Suomen Palloliitto)	3rd	
1972	Tier 3	III Divisioona (Third Division)	Group 2	Finnish FA (Suomen Palloliitto)	7th	
1973	Tier 4	III Divisioona (Third Division)	Group 3	Finnish FA (Suomen Palloliitto)	9th	Relegated
1974	Tier 5	IV Divisioona (Fourth Division)	Group 5	Finnish FA (Suomen Palloliitto)	2nd	
1975	Tier 5	IV Divisioona (Fourth Division)	Group 5	Finnish FA (Suomen Palloliitto)	3rd	
1976	Tier 5	IV Divisioona (Fourth Division)	Group 4	Finnish FA (Suomen Palloliitto)	4th	
1977	Tier 5	IV Divisioona (Fourth Division)	Group 5	Finnish FA (Suomen Palloliitto)	1st	Promoted
1978	Tier 4	III Divisioona (Third Division)	Group 3	Finnish FA (Suomen Palloliitto)	7th	
1979	Tier 4	III Divisioona (Third Division)	Group 3	Finnish FA (Suomen Palloliitto)	8th	
1980	Tier 4	III Divisioona (Third Division)	Group 3	Finnish FA (Suomen Palloliitto)	5th	
1981	Tier 4	III Divisioona (Third Division)	Group 3	Finnish FA (Suomen Palloliitto)	5th	
1982	Tier 4	III Divisioona (Third Division)	Group 3	Finnish FA (Suomen Palloliitto)	9th	
1983	Tier 4	III Divisioona (Third Division)	Group 3	Finnish FA (Suomen Palloliitto)	2nd	Promotion Playoff
1984	Tier 4	III Divisioona (Third Division)	Group 3	Finnish FA (Suomen Palloliitto)	7th	
1985	Tier 4	III Divisioona (Third Division)	Group 3	Finnish FA (Suomen Palloliitto)	4th	
1986	Tier 4	III Divisioona (Third Division)	Group 3	Finnish FA (Suomen Palloliitto)	9th	
1987	Tier 4	III Divisioona (Third Division)	Group 3	Finnish FA (Suomen Palloliitto)	6th	
1988	Tier 4	III Divisioona (Third Division)	Group 3	Finnish FA (Suomen Palloliitto)	3rd	
1989	Tier 4	III Divisioona (Third Division)	Group 3	Finnish FA (Suomen Palloliitto)	1st	Promoted
1990	Tier 3	II Divisioona (Second Division)	West Group	Finnish FA (Suomen Palloliitto)	9th	
1991	Tier 3	II Divisioona (Second Division)	West Group	Finnish FA (Suomen Palloliitto)	3rd	
1992	Tier 3	II Divisioona (Second Division)	West Group	Finnish FA (Suomen Palloliitto)	6th	
1993	Tier 3	II Divisioona (Second Division)	West Group	Finnish FA (Suomen Palloliitto)	1st	Promoted
1994	Tier 2	Ykkönen (First Division)		Finnish FA (Suomen Palloliitto)	12th	Relegated
1995	Tier 3	Kakkonen (Second Division)	South Group	Finnish FA (Suomen Palloliitto)	10th	Relegated
1996	Tier 4	Kolmonen (Third Division)	Group 3	Turku District (SPL Turku)	8th	
1997	Tier 4	Kolmonen (Third Division)	Group 3	Turku District (SPL Turku)	9th	
1998	Tier 4	Kolmonen (Third Division)	Group 3	Turku District (SPL Turku)	5th	
1999	Tier 4	Kolmonen (Third Division)	Group 3	Turku District (SPL Turku)	1st	Promoted
2000	Tier 3	Kakkonen (Second Division)	West Group	Finnish FA (Suomen Palloliitto)	8th	
2001	Tier 3	Kakkonen (Second Division)	West Group	Finnish FA (Suomen Palloliitto)	6th	
2002	Tier 3	Kakkonen (Second Division)	West Group	Finnish FA (Suomen Palloliitto)	9th	
2003	Tier 3	Kakkonen (Second Division)	West Group	Finnish FA (Suomen Palloliitto)	5th	
2004	Tier 3	Kakkonen (Second Division)	West Group	Finnish FA (Suomen Palloliitto)	3rd	
2005	Tier 3	Kakkonen (Second Division)	West Group	Finnish FA (Suomen Palloliitto)	3rd	
2006	Tier 3	Kakkonen (Second Division)	Group B	Finnish FA (Suomen Palloliitto)	13th	Relegated
2007	Tier 4	Kolmonen (Third Division)	Turku and Åland Islands	Turku District (SPL Turku)	7th	
2008	Tier 4	Kolmonen (Third Division)	Turku and Åland Islands	Turku District (SPL Turku)	9th	
2009	Tier 4	Kolmonen (Third Division)	Turku and Åland Islands	Turku District (SPL Turku)	11th	
2010	Tier 4	Kolmonen (Third Division)	Turku and Åland Islands	Turku District (SPL Turku)	9th	
2011	Tier 4	Kolmonen (Third Division)	Turku and Åland Islands	Turku District (SPL Turku)	10th	
2012	Tier 4	Kolmonen (Third Division)	Turku and Åland Islands	Turku District (SPL Turku)	9th	
2013	Tier 4	Kolmonen (Third Division)	Turku and Åland Islands	Turku District (SPL Turku)	10th	
2014	Tier 4	Kolmonen (Third Division)	Turku and Åland Islands	Turku District (SPL Turku)	4th	
2015	Tier 4	Kolmonen (Third Division)	Turku and Åland Islands	Turku District (SPL Turku)	3rd	
2016	Tier 4	Kolmonen (Third Division)	Turku and Åland Islands	Turku District (SPL Turku)	6th	
2017	Tier 4	Kolmonen (Third Division)	Western Finland	Western District (SPL Länsi-Suomi)	7th	
2018	Tier 4	Kolmonen (Third Division)	Western Finland	Western District (SPL Länsi-Suomi)	5th	
2019	Tier 4	Kolmonen (Third Division)	Western Finland	Western District (SPL Länsi-Suomi)	1st	Promoted
2020	Tier 3	Kakkonen (Second Division)	Group B	Finnish FA (Suomen Palloliitto)		

- 3 seasons in Ykkönen
- 36 seasons in Kakkonen
- 36 seasons in Kolmonen
- 4 seasons in Nelonen

=== Club Structure ===
The club runs a large number of teams including a men's team, a ladies' team, a veteran's side (Team 82 Oldboys) and 8 boys and 4 girls junior teams.

A key facility provided by the club is the Aktia Arena, a floodlit all-weather pitch that is 104 x 62 metres (or two junior pitches 62 x 45 metres). Some matches are played here but the main home venue is at Pajbacka.

=== 2010 season ===
PIF Men's Team are competing in the Kolmonen administered by the Turku SPL. This is the fourth highest tier in the Finnish football system. In 2009 PIF finished in eleventh position in their Kolmonen section.

== Orienteering ==
Pargas won the women's relay in Tiomila in 1999. The orienteering section was founded in 1945.

== References and sources ==
- Official Club Website
- Official Football Club Website
- Finnish Wikipedia
- Suomen Cup
- Pargas IF Facebook
