= Kyle Konwea =

Swedish footballer

Personal information
- Full name: Kyle Chiedu Linus Konwea
- Date of birth: 30 March 1989 (age 37)
- Place of birth: Gothenburg, Sweden
- Height: 1.92 m (6 ft 4 in)
- Position: Centre-back

Youth career
- Fässbergs IF
- Västra Frölunda IF

Senior career*
Years	Team	Apps	(Gls)
2008–2009	Qviding FIF	29	(2)
2010	BK Häcken	0	(0)
2010–2015	Assyriska FF	80	(6)
2016	Siah Jamegan	8	(0)
2016–2017	Assyriska FF	11	(0)
2017	IF Brommapojkarna	9	(0)
2018	SJK	0	(0)
2018–2022	Assyriska FF	0	(0)
- * Club domestic league appearances and goals as of 28 March 2018 (UTC)

Kyle Konwea (born 30 March 1989) is a retired Swedish footballer who last played for Assyriska FF as a central defender.

== Career ==
Kyle Konwea transferred from Assyriska FF to Siah Jamegan of the Persian Gulf Pro League on 11 December 2015. On 14 March 2018 SJK announced that their contract with Konwea had been mutually terminated due to home-sickness.

== Personal life ==
Konwea was born to a Nigerian father and Swedish mother. He has been approached by the Nigerian FA to represent Nigeria internationally.
