= Eemeli Virta =

Finnish footballer (born 2000)

Personal information
- Date of birth: 28 September 2000 (age 26)
- Place of birth: Anjalankoski, Finland
- Height: 1.86 m (6 ft 1 in)
- Position: Central midfielder

Youth career
- Kouvolan Jalkapallo
- MyPa
- Reipas Lahti

Senior career*
Years	Team	Apps	(Gls)
2016	Purha	7	(0)
2017–2024	Lahti	123	(4)
2017	→ Kuusysi	3	(0)
2018	→ PK Keski-Uusimaa (loan)	1	(0)
2020	→ Reipas Lahti	1	(1)

International career
2008	Finland U18	2	(0)
- * Club domestic league appearances and goals as of 27 October 2024

Eemeli Virta (born 28 September 2000) is a Finnish professional footballer who plays as a midfielder.

== Career ==
After playing for the youth teams of Kouvolan Jalkapallo and Myllykosken Pallo in his home town Kouvola, Virta moved to Lahti and signed with FC Lahti organisation in 2017.
