= Vahid Hambo =

Finnish footballer (born 1995)

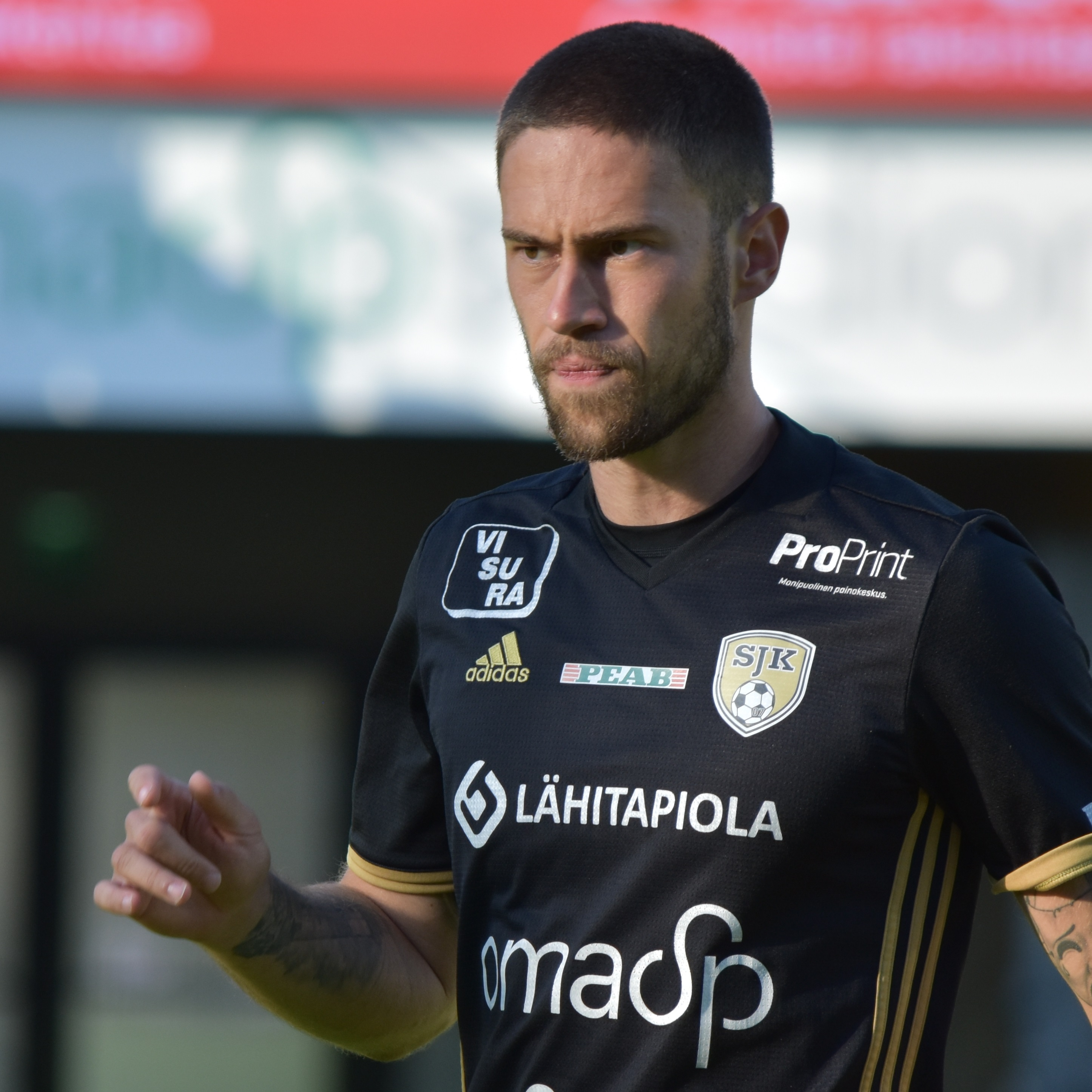
- Hambo with SJK in 2018.

Personal information
- Date of birth: 3 February 1995 (age 31)
- Place of birth: Helsinki, Finland
- Height: 1.93 m (6 ft 4 in)
- Position: Striker

Youth career
- HJK
- 2012–2014: Sampdoria

Senior career*
Years	Team	Apps	(Gls)
2014	Ilves	5	(1)
2015	Inter Turku	6	(4)
2015–2017	Brighton & Hove Albion	0	(0)
2017–2018	SJK	22	(3)
2018	→ SJK Akatemia	1	(0)
2018	RoPS	11	(3)
2019	Astra Giurgiu	6	(0)
2019	Sūduva	4	(0)
2020	Lahti	17	(3)
2021–2022	IFK Mariehamn	39	(7)
2023–	VJS	5	(7)

International career
2011–2012	Finland U17	3	(0)
2013–2014	Finland U19	3	(3)
2015–2016	Finland U21	1	(2)
- * Club domestic league appearances and goals as of 21 December 2023

Vahid Hambo (born 3 February 1995) is a Finnish footballer of Bosnian descent who plays as a striker.

== Club career ==
=== Early years ===
Born in Helsinki to Bosnian parents, he played with his local team, HJK's youth sides before switching to Sampdoria's Primavera team. His time in Italy was blighted by injuries, and after two years his contract was terminated by mutual consent, after scoring only once in 23 games.

=== Ilves and Inter Turku ===
After his departure from Sampdoria, Hambo signed for Ilves in the Finnish second division, Ykkönen. He impressed and was quickly grabbed by Inter Turku in the top-flight Veikkausliiga. His good form continued, but injuries limited his playing time, making only 6 appearances in the league. Despite this, he was hailed as one of Inter's best players.

=== Brighton ===
Still recovering from a knee injury, Hambo signed for Brighton & Hove Albion in the English Championship, joining fellow Finn Niki Mäenpää. The club's officials stated that Hambo would start playing for the reserve team firstly, to get him known to English football better and help recover from his injury.

=== SJK ===
On 19 July 2017, Hambo returned to Finland, signing for Veikkausliiga club SJK until the end of the 2018 season.

=== RoPS ===
Hambo signed with RoPS in August 2018, but left the club again after the season.

=== Astra Giurgiu ===
On 7 February 2019, Vahid Hambo signed a contract, valid for two years and a half, with Romanian side FC Astra Giurgiu.

=== Sūduva ===
On 12 September 2019, he became a member of Lithuanian FK Sūduva Marijampolė.

== International career ==
Hambo has appeared for Finnish under 21-side. He was also selected for a match for the senior side in the 2016 Euro's qualifying, but had to withdraw due to his injury.

== Career statistics ==
As of 23 May 2024

Appearances and goals by club, season and competition
Club	Season	League			Domestic Cups (Note: Includes Suomen Cup, Finnish League Cup, Cupa României and Lithuanian Cup)		Europe		Total	
Club	Season	Division	Apps	Goals	Apps	Goals	Apps	Goals	Apps	Goals
Ilves	2014	Ykkönen	5	1	–		–		5	1
Inter Turku	2015	Veikkausliiga	6	4	7	9	–		13	13
Brighton & Hove Albion	2015–16	Championship	0	0	0	0	–		0	0
Brighton & Hove Albion	2016–17	Championship	0	0	0	0	–		0	0
Brighton & Hove Albion	Total		0	0	0	0	–	–	0	0
SJK	2017	Veikkausliiga	7	1	0	0	–		7	1
SJK	2018	Veikkausliiga	15	2	5	3	–		20	5
SJK	Total		22	3	5	3	–	–	27	6
SJK Akatemia	2018	Kakkonen	1	2	–		–		1	2
RoPS	2018	Veikkausliiga	11	3	–		–		11	3
Astra Giurgiu	2018–19	Liga I	5	0	2	2	–		7	2
Astra Giurgiu	2019–20	Liga I	1	0	0	0	–		1	0
Astra Giurgiu	Total		6	0	2	2	–	–	8	2
Sūduva	2019	A Lyga	4	0	1	0	–		5	0
Lahti	2020	Veikkausliiga	17	3	6	4	–		23	7
IFK Mariehamn	2021	Veikkausliiga	18	5	3	0	–		21	5
IFK Mariehamn	2022	Veikkausliiga	22	2	6	1	–		28	3
IFK Mariehamn	Total		40	7	9	1	–	–	49	8
VJS	2023	Kolmonen	5	7	–		–		5	7
Career total			117	30	30	19	–	–	147	49

== Honours ==
Astra Giurgiu

- Cupa României: Runner-up 2018–19

Individual

- Veikkausliiga Player of the Month: April 2015
