= Reuben Ayarna =

Ghanaian footballer (born 1985)

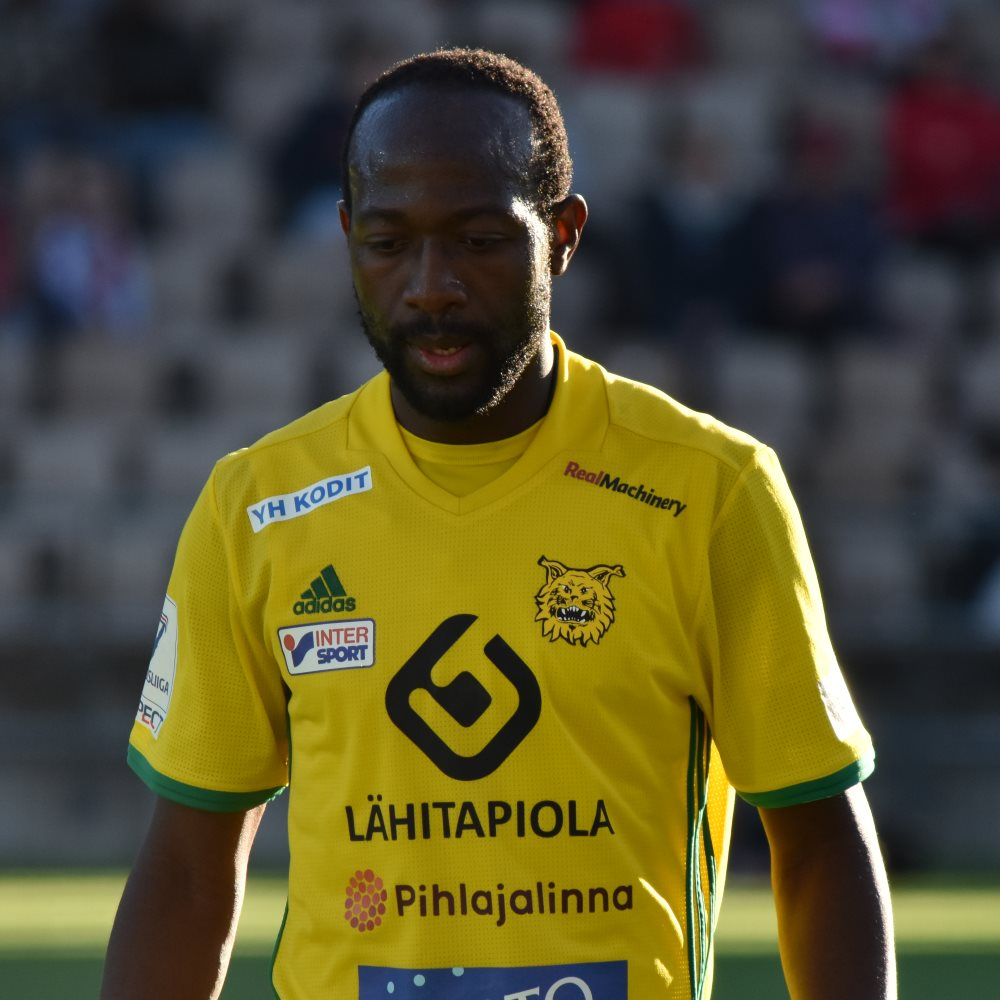
- Reuben Ayarna with FC Ilves in 2017.

Personal information
- Full name: Reuben Ayarna
- Date of birth: 22 October 1985 (age 41)
- Place of birth: Accra, Ghana
- Height: 1.78 m (5 ft 10 in)
- Position: Defensive midfielder

Youth career
- 1997–2000: Desisderoes Babies
- 2001–2005: Liberty Professionals

College career
Years	Team	Apps	(Gls)
2005–2007	Boston College Eagles	52	

Senior career*
Years	Team	Apps	(Gls)
2005–2008	Boston Olympiacos	40	(15)
2008–2012	GAIS	93	(1)
2013	BK Häcken	5	(0)
2014–2015	GAIS	38	(2)
2016–2017	Ilves	60	(0)
2018	SJK	16	(1)
2018–2019	KuPS	32	(3)
2022	Vermont Green	1	(0)
Total		285	(22)

Managerial career
- 2022–2023: Vermont Green (assistant)
- 2023–: Southern Connecticut Owls (assistant)
- * Club domestic league appearances and goals as of 29 March 2022

Reuben Ayarna (born 22 October 1985, in Accra) is a Ghanaian footballer who is currently a player-coach for Vermont Green FC. Before Vermont Green FC, he played defensive midfielder for Kuopion Palloseura.

Ayarna began his football career at the age of 12 years at Desisderoes Babies and later playing for Liberty Babies. He attended Presbyterian Boys' Secondary School where he also played in the school's football team. Ayarna played most of his career in the Scandinavian region, playing for GAIS, BK Häcken in Sweden and Ilves, SJK and KuPS in Finland.

In 2019, Ayarna won his first career league title with KuPS, helping them win the title after a 43-year wait.

In April 2022, Reuben joined Vermont Green FC as a player coach to assist head coach Adam Pfeifer.

== Career ==
=== Growing up and early football career ===
Reuben Ayarna was born on 22 October 1985 in Accra the capital city of Ghana, where he lived for the first four years of his life. His mother was the principal of a school and his father worked as an official at a state oil company. In connection with Ayarna's father being transferred to Tamale, the regional capital of the country's northern region, and taking Ayarna with him, he discovered football. In the middle class to which the family belonged, football was seen as a sport for the poor street children, and Ayarna's parents disapproved of the son's new employment, as they wanted him to invest everything in his studies. However, Reuben continued to play football after school, even though it resulted in penalties from both parents and school staff. At the age of nine-years, Ayarna returned to Accra in 1994,

Ayarna began his career with the U-12 youth team Desisderoes Babies in Ghana later on he had the chance of playing organized football for the first time, when a youth coach at the then newly formed club Liberty Professionals offered him a place on the youth team Liberty Babies. His parents were still not in agreement but he still went on to play in the club without their knowledge. He became captain for the team and when on one occasion they won a national youth tournament, his parents got to see him lift the trophy on live TV. He had been exposed, but at the same time the mother and father became proud of their son and their attitude towards Ayarna's football playing softened.

Ayarna studied and played football at Presbyterian Boys' Secondary School, where he was named the best football player in the 2003–04 and 2004–05 school seasons.

=== College football in the USA ===
During the final year in high school, Ayarna was divided; he had a hard time seeing how he could combine playing football with university studies. However, there would be a solution to the problem; Sellas Tetteh was the coach of Ghana's U23 national team and had heard from one of his contacts at Boston College in the USA that the school was interested in picking up a Ghanaian who was both a good football player and a student.

Tetteh tipped the school about Ayarna, and they sent over a scout who interviewed him and watched two matches. Ayarna was offered a scholarship to attend Boston College for three years and play on their soccer team and in 2005 he left his home country for the United States.

While playing for Boston College Ayarna helped the team to finish first in their conference as well as win the 2007 Atlantic Coast Conference Soccer Championship. After playing for both Boston College and Boston Olympiacos, Ayarna decided to forgo finishing his college education in business to play professional soccer in Europe.

=== GAIS ===
==== 2008 season ====
"I feel so happy about the move because I have spent my whole life dreaming of playing in Europe. [...]There were also top clubs in the American top soccer league interested in me, but I thought Europe offers much more than the MLS. "

— Reuben Ayarna after signing for GAIS.

After Nigerian defensive midfielder Prince Ikpe Ekong signed for Djurgårdens IF, GAIS needed a replacement, with the help of agent Patrick Mörk, Ayarna was discovered as a potential replacement and in July 2008 he signed a 4.5-year deal with GAIS which was due to expire after the 2012 season. He was given the number 6 jersey and he began a successful professional career as a fan favorite.

The debut in the Allsvenskan was delayed until the last round of the season, Ayarna made his debut on 8 November 2008 in a match against AIK when he was named on the starting line up. Among other things, he was close to scoring on a long shot, and was named the man of the match.

==== 2009 season ====
At the end of the season GAIS changed their coach and brought in Alexander Axén, after which in 2009 Ayarna started playing more regularly. Within that season period he made a total of 19 league appearances with only seven from the starting position. He was competing with Johan Mårtensson for one of the two defensive midfield positions. Since their playing style was similar, the coach figured it was not possible playing them at the same time until the final away match of the season against Halmstads BK, that they both started together. At the end of the match Gais won 3–1, breaking a streak of four games without a win. The cooperation of the two players was a contributing factor to the victory and the following season they were both regular in the team's midfield.

==== 2009 to 2012 season ====
In the summer of 2011, Mårtensson left the club, but Ayarna still remained a regular player and formed a new partnership with Markus Gustafsson in the inner midfield. That season, Ayarna was a clear contributing factor to GAIS's fifth-place position in the Allsvenskan; the club's highest ranking in the league since 1989. On 22 April 2012, Ayarna scored his first goal and only goal for Gais when he scored the final goal in 2–0 win against IFK Norrköping.

=== BK Häcken ===
"Ayarna will be a great asset in the defensive midfield now that Oscar is gone.....We know his qualities and we are pleased to tie him to us. "

— Sonny Karlsson about Ayarna after signing for BK Häcken.

==== 2013 season ====
In February 2013, BK Häcken signed Ayarna on a free transfer after his contract with GAIS had expired and he refused to sign a new contract. He was lauded by the club's sporting director as being a good asset in defence and a good signing for the club Sonny Karlsson.

=== Return to GAIS ===
==== 2014 to 2015 season ====
In August 2014, after playing a season for BK Häcken, Ayarna signed again with GAIS. After helping the side to 11th position in the league along with some impressive performances his contract was extended by an extra year. He played 27 league matches by the end of the 2015 season. By the end of his second stay with the Gothenburg-based club he had made 38 league appearances bringing his total appearance for the club in both stints to 131 league appearances.

=== Ilves ===
In 2016, after leaving GAIS, Ayarna signed for Finnish side Tampereen Ilves. On 7 March 2017, he scored in the club's match against KuPS in the Finish cup helping them to a 2–1 victory. In July 2017, Ilves signed his fellow Ghanaian player Baba Mensah. He showed excitement of a Ghanaian joining him at the club and mentioned that he had what it took to succeed in the Finnish league.

=== SJK ===
On 30 October 2017, Ayarna signed a one-year contract with Seinäjoen Jalkapallokerho, with the option of an additional year. He played in 16 league matches and scored 1 goal in his year stint with the club.

=== KuPS ===
==== 2018 season ====
In August 2018, after playing the first round of the season at SJK, he joined fellow Finish side, Kuopion Palloseura in the second round of the season. He made his debut for the club on 5 August 2018 in a 3–2 home victory against Turun Palloseura, playing the full 90 minutes of the match. He scored his first goal for KuPS on 22 September 2020 in a league match against FC Honka. He equalized in the 56th minute of the match to help the match end in a 1–1 draw. He helped the club to a 3rd place league finish at the end of the season, becoming a key player of the team. He played in all matches except one in the second round of the season from when he signed, playing the full 90 minutes in all those matches to also help the team qualify for the Europa League. At the end of the season he had made 11 appearances in the league and scored 1 goal.

==== 2019 season ====
Ayarna had the chance of playing the full season in the 2019 season starting with training with the club in their pre-season tour in Turkey. He featured in the club's first match of the season on 3 April 2019, playing full 90 minutes in a 2–2 draw against Rovaniemen Palloseura. Ayarna still maintained his role as a key member of the squad playing starting in several matches within the season. He played the full 90 minutes as KuPS scored 5–1 FC Lahti in a league match on 25 June 2019. He scored his first goal of the season against his former club on 24 May 2019. He scored the only goal of the match with KUPS winning 1–0 at home. He scored his second goal of the season during the final game of the season against Inter Turku to allow KuPS win 2–0. At the end of the season KuPS emerged as champions of the Veikkausliiga for the first time in 43 years ending the club's 43-year wait for the title since they were last crowned champions of Finland in 1976.

=== Vermont Green ===
In April 2022, Ayarna joined USL League Two club Vermont Green as a player-coach. Ayarna did not rejoin the Green for the 2024 season.

== International career ==
In October 2019 he announced his resignation from the Ghana national team due to his age.

== Personal life ==
Reuben Aryana started basic education at God's Grace International School, Ghana, graduated and continued to Presbyterian Secondary Boys' School, Legon. Aryana has a Bachelors of science degree in Sports Management and a Masters in business administration (MBA) both from the University College of Northern Denmark.

== Honours ==
KuPS

- Finnish Veikkausliiga: 2019
