= Stefan Strömborg =

Finnish football coach and former footballer (born 1968)

Personal information
- Date of birth: 6 September 1968 (age 58)
- Place of birth: Parainen, Finland
- Height: 1.77 m (5 ft 10 in)
- Position: Midfielder

Youth career
- 1979–1983: Pargas IF
- 1984: Turun Pallo
- 1985–1987: TPS

Senior career*
Years	Team	Apps	(Gls)
1988	Ekenäs IF	20	(5)
1989	Åbo IFK	20	(1)
1990–1992	Pargas IF	48	(9)
1993	IFK Mariehamn	22	(3)
1994	TPS	20	(1)
1995–1996	GIF Sundsvall	36	(3)
1997	Inter Turku	5	(1)
1997	→ VG-62 (loan)	4	(0)
1998	Hangö IK	26	(1)
1999–2001	Pargas IF	43	(5)
2002–2003	IFK Mariehamn	15	(1)

Managerial career
- 2000: Pargas IF (assistant)
- 2012–2013: IFK Mariehamn (assistant)
- 2014: TPS (assistant)
- 2014–2015: Åbo IFK
- 2015: Inter Turku (assistant)
- 2016: Ekenäs IF
- 2018: SJK (conditioning coach)
- 2019–2023: Pargas IF
- * Club domestic league appearances and goals

Stefan Strömborg (born 6 September 1968) is a Finnish football coach and a former football player.
