= Anders Bååth =

Swedish footballer

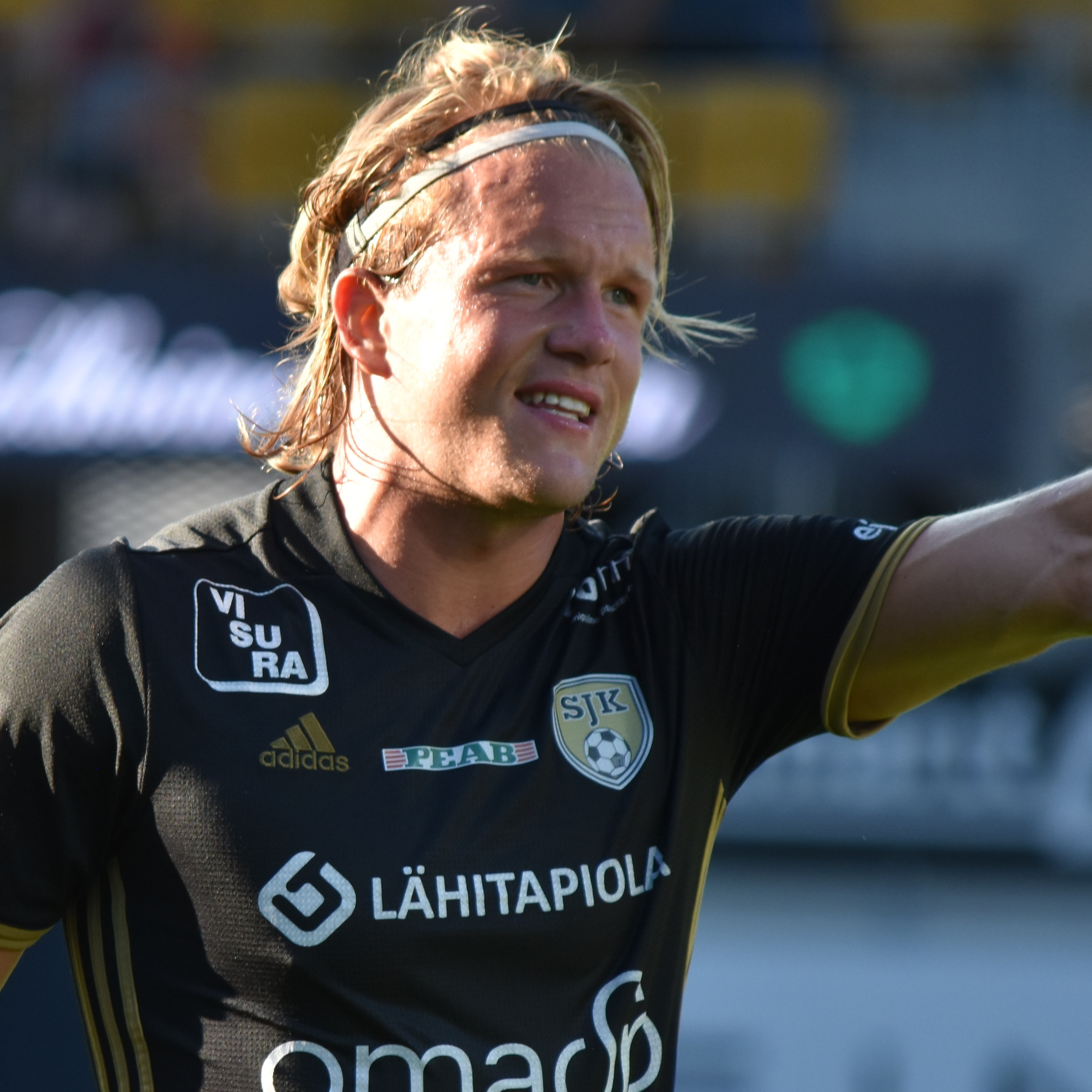
- Bååth with SJK in 2018.

Personal information
- Full name: Anders Olov Bååth Sjöblom
- Date of birth: 13 April 1991 (age 35)
- Place of birth: Sweden
- Height: 1.83 m (6 ft 0 in)
- Position: Midfielder

Team information
- Current team: Karlstad (Manager)

Youth career
- IFK Viksjö

Senior career*
Years	Team	Apps	(Gls)
2008–2009	IF Brommapojkarna	4	(0)
2009	→ Gröndals IK (loan)	22	(1)
2010–2013	Syrianska	70	(3)
2014–2016	Gefle	69	(4)
2017	Brommapojkarna	6	(0)
2018	SJK	29	(1)
2019	Syrianska	14	(1)
2020–2021	United IK Nordic	36	(4)
2022	Österlen FF	7	(1)

International career
2008	Sweden U19	1	(0)

Managerial career
- 2019–2021: IF Brommapojkarna (youth)
- 2022: Österlen
- 2023: Åtvidaberg
- 2024–2025: Umeå FC
- 2026: IK Brage
- 2026–: Karlstad
- * Club domestic league appearances and goals

Anders Olov Bååth Sjöblom (born 13 April 1991) is a Swedish football coach and a former professional footballer who played as a midfielder and currently serves as the manager of IF Karlstad Fotboll in Ettan Norra.

== Career ==
=== Coaching career ===
While still playing, Bååth began his coaching career at his former club IF Brommapojkarna, where he worked in the youth sector for three years.

In December 2021 it was confirmed, that Bååth had been hired as manager of Österlen FF. During the season, Bååth also made a few appearances for the team. In mid October 2022 it was revealed, that Bååth had left the position.

In January 2026, he became new manager of IK Brage in Superettan. He was sacked in September 2026. Just nine days later, he was announced as new manager of IF Karlstad Fotboll in Ettan Norra.
