= Emile Paul Tendeng =

Senegalese footballer

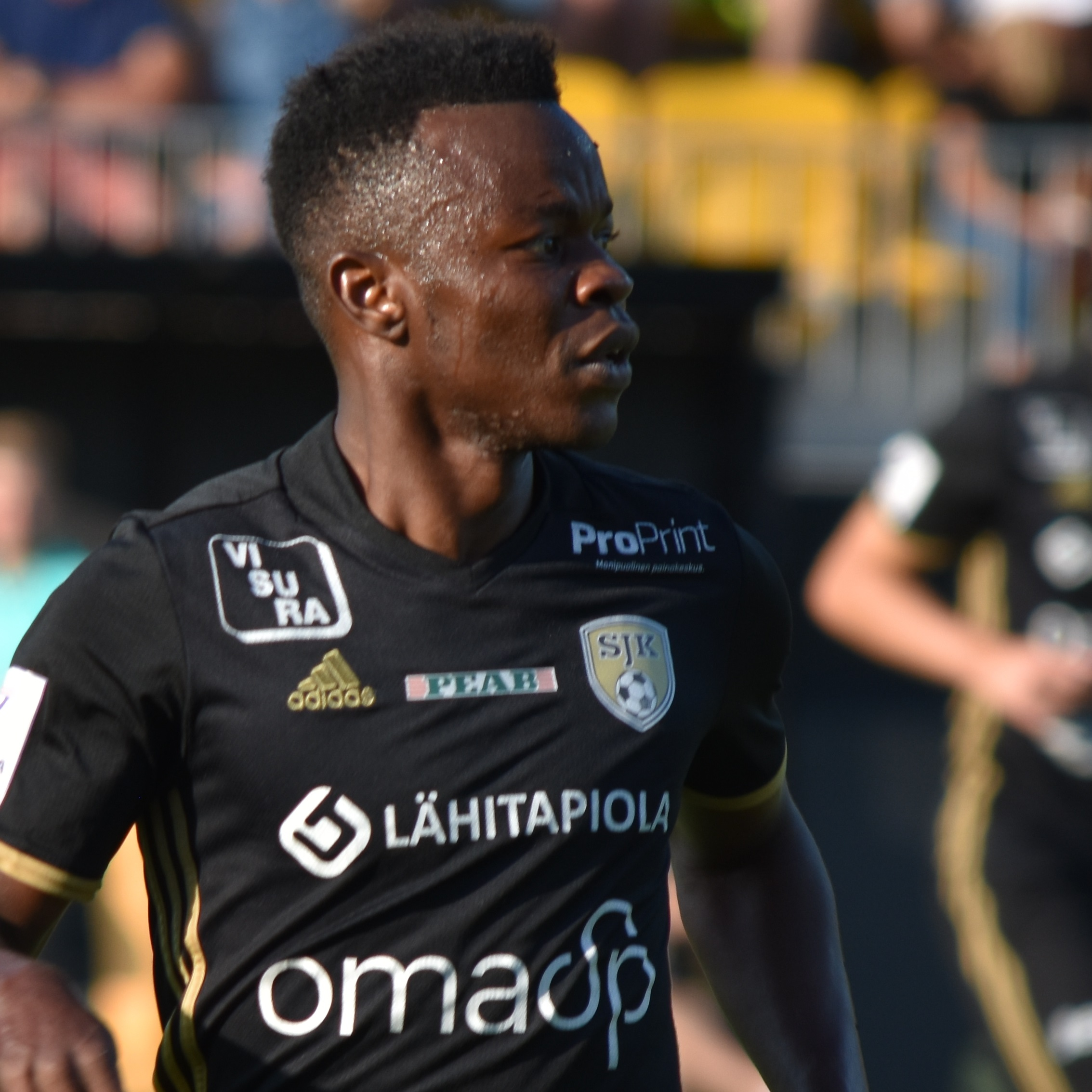
- Tendeng with SJK in 2018

Personal information
- Date of birth: 9 March 1992 (age 34)
- Place of birth: Ziguinchor, Senegal
- Height: 1.72 m (5 ft 8 in)
- Positions: Attacking midfielder; winger

Senior career*
Years	Team	Apps	(Gls)
2009–2015	Casa Sport	26	(8)
2013	→ FC Vaslui (loan)	6	(0)
2015	AS Douanes		
2016–2017	Ilves	49	(9)
2017–2018	SJK	24	(2)
2019–2020	Ilves	28	(1)
2021	Mariehamn	17	(0)
2022	Jaro	25	(4)

International career
2011–2012	Senegal U23	6	(0)
2013	Senegal	1	(0)
- * Club domestic league appearances and goals as of 8 October 2022

Emile Paul Tendeng (born 31 December 1992) is a Senegalese professional footballer who plays as an attacking midfielder or winger.

== Career ==
The assistant coach of Casa Sport described him as "football car crash, prodigy and player with extraordinary potential", and compared him with Iain Dowie.

In 2013, Tendeng moved to FC Vaslui on loan from Casa Sport for six months.

In February 2016, Tendeng signed a two-year contract with Finnish club Ilves.

On 30 October 2017, Tendeng signed a one-year contract with SJK, with the option of an additional year.

For the 2021 season, he joined Mariehamn.

On 29 January 2022, he signed with Jaro for the 2022 season.

== Honours ==
Individual

- Veikkausliiga Top assist provider: 2016
- Veikkausliiga Player of the Year: 2016
- Veikkausliiga Midfielder of the Year: 2016
- Veikkausliiga Team of the Year: 2016
