= Issa Thiaw =

Senegalese footballer

Personal information
- Full name: Mame Seydina Issa Laye Thiaw
- Date of birth: 12 October 1992 (age 34)
- Place of birth: Yoff, Senegal
- Height: 1.87 m (6 ft 2 in)
- Position: Midfielder

Team information
- Current team: MP (manager)

Youth career
- Diambars

Senior career*
Years	Team	Apps	(Gls)
2012	RS Yoff	?	(?)
2012	Voința Sibiu	0	(0)
2012	FC Cisnădie	0	(0)
2013	Unirea Alba Iulia	?	(?)
2014–2016	Șoimii Pâncota	46	(6)
2016–2017	Sepsi OSK	37	(8)
2018	Ilves	27	(7)
2019–2020	KuPS	12	(2)
Total		122	(23)

Managerial career
- 2021–2022: KuPS (U19 assistant)
- 2022: KuPS II
- 2023: KuPS (assistant)
- 2024–: MP
- * Club domestic league appearances and goals

Mame Seydina Issa Laye Thiaw (born 12 October 1992), commonly known as Issa Thiaw, is a Senegalese professional football coach and a former player who played as a midfielder. He is the head coach of Finnish club Mikkelin Palloilijat (MP) in Ykkönen.

== Career ==
Issa started his career at RS Yoff from Senegal, then played in Romania for various Liga I and Liga II clubs such as: Voința Sibiu, FC Cisnădie, Unirea Alba Iulia and Șoimii Pâncota. After a Liga I promotion with Sepsi OSK, he made his debut with Sepsi Osk in the first league on 16 July 2017, in a 1–0 defeat against Astra Giurgiu.

== Personal life ==
His cousin Malick Thiaw is a German-Finnish-Senegalese professional footballer for Newcastle United.
