= Aristote Mboma =

Congolese footballer (born 1994)

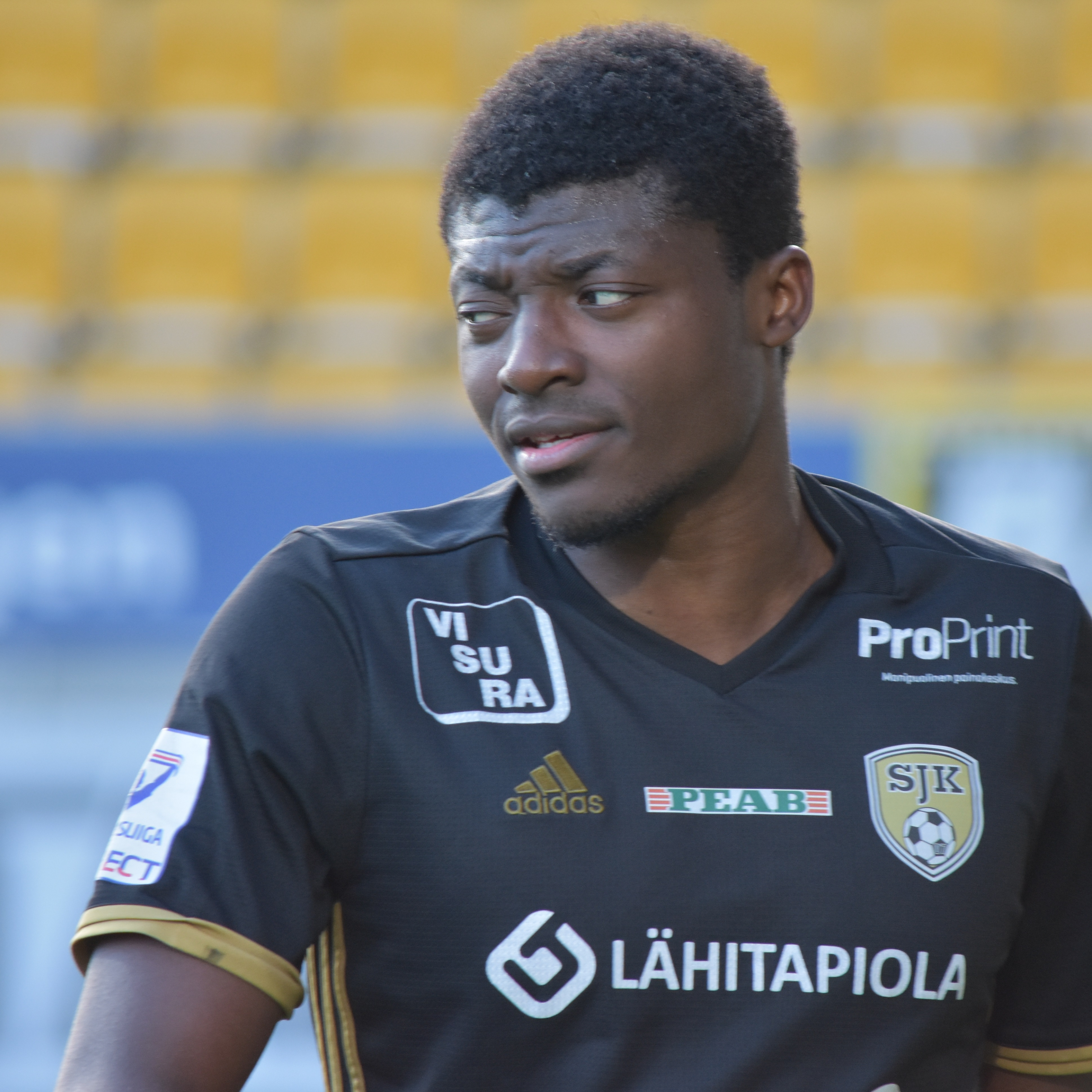
- Mboma with SJK in 2018

Personal information
- Full name: Aristote Mboma
- Date of birth: 30 June 1994 (age 32)
- Place of birth: Kinshasa, Zaire
- Height: 1.85 m (6 ft 1 in)
- Position: Forward

Senior career*
Years	Team	Apps	(Gls)
2011	FC Blackbird	1	(1)
2012	Huima	14	(13)
2013–2014	Pallohonka	21	(5)
2014	Honka	3	(1)
2014	Újpest	7	(0)
2015	Lahti	16	(2)
2015–2016	AC Oulu	27	(18)
2016–2018	SJK	49	(10)
2019	IFK Mariehamn	25	(7)
- * Club domestic league appearances and goals

Aristote Mboma (born 30 June 1994) is a Congolese former professional footballer who played as a forward. He also holds Finnish citizenship.

== Early life ==
Born in Kinshasa, Zaire, he moved to Finland as a refugee at the age of 14. He also holds Finnish citizenship.

== Career ==
On 12 November 2018, Mboma joined fellow Veikkausliiga side IFK Mariehamn from SJK on a two-year contract. Following rape accusations against him, Mboma was released by Mariehamn in May 2020.

== Personal life ==
In July 2020, Mboma was given a four-year prison sentence for two counts of aggravated rape, two assaults and one minor assault. The crimes took place in Åland, Finland, between 2019 and 2020.

== Career statistics ==
Appearances and goals by club, season and competition
Club	Season	League			Cup		League Cup		Europe		Total	
Club	Season	Division	Apps	Goals	Apps	Goals	Apps	Goals	Apps	Goals	Apps	Goals
FC Blackbird	2011	Kolmonen	1	0	0	0	0	0	0	0	1	0
Huima	2012	Kolmonen	14	13	0	0	0	0	0	0	14	13
Pallohonka	2013	Kakkonen	12	1	0	0	0	0	0	0	12	1
Pallohonka	2014	Kakkonen	9	4	0	0	0	0	0	0	9	4
Pallohonka	Total		21	5	0	0	0	0	0	0	21	5
Honka	2014	Veikkausliiga	3	1	0	0	0	0	0	0	3	1
Újpest	2014–15	Nemzeti Bajnokság I	7	0	1	0	7	1	0	0	15	2
Lahti	2015	Veikkausliiga	9	2	0	0	0	0	0	0	9	2
Career total			57	21	3	1	5	1	0	0	65	23
