= 2015 Finnish Cup =

Suomen Cup

Tournament details
- Country: Finland
- Teams: 132

Final positions
- Champions: IFK Mariehamn
- Runners-up: FC Inter

Tournament statistics
- Matches played: 128
- Top goal scorer: Dever Orgill

The 2015 Finnish Cup (Suomen Cup) is the 61st season of the Finnish Cup. 132 clubs entered the competition, including all sides on the top two levels of the Finnish football pyramid (Veikkausliiga and Ykkönen), 19 sides from Kakkonen and 91 from lower levels. The winner of the cup enters the first qualifying round of the 2016–17 UEFA Europa League.

== Teams ==
Round	Dates	Clubs involved	Winners from previous round	New entries this round	Leagues entering this round
First round	11 Jan 2015 – 1 Feb 2015	16	−	16	Kolmonen and lower levels (16 teams)
Second round	18 Jan 2015 – 27 Feb 2015	80	8	72	Kolmonen and lower levels (72 teams)
Third round	17 Feb 2015 – 9 Mar 2015	72	40	32	Ykkönen (10 teams); Kakkonen (19 teams); Kolmonen (3 teams)
Fourth round	13 Mar 2015 – 22 Apr 2015	40	36	4	Veikkausliiga (4 teams)
Fifth round	27 Mar 2015 – 4 Apr 2015	24	20	4	Veikkausliiga (4 teams)
Sixth round	15 Apr 2015 – 16 Apr 2015	16	12	4	Veikkausliiga (4 teams)
Quarter-finals	26 Apr 2015	8	8	−	−
Semi-finals	15 August 2015	4	4	−	−
Final	29 September 2015	2	2	−	−

== First round ==
16 teams playing in the Kolmonen and lower leagues started the cup at the first round. The draw for the first and second rounds was held on 22 December 2014.

11 January 2015	HJK/Kantsu	1–4	Gnistan/Ogeli	Helsinki
14:15 EET	Aittasalo 21'	Report	Huurros 14', 24'; Simola 29', 73'	Stadium: Talin jalkapallohalli

16 January 2015	PK-09	1–7	TuPS	Hyvinkää
16:30 EET	Näveri 38'	Report	Honkanen 11'; Ståhle 35'; Ravi 38'; Kunttu 38'; Fihlman 78'; J. Tiira 79'; Koponen 81'	Stadium: Kankurin TN; Attendance: 50; Referee: Juuso Vuorinen

23 January 2015	TamU-K	1–0	P-Iirot/2	Tampere
22:30 EET	Näveri 75'	Report		Stadium: Pirkkahalli C Attendance: 132

24 January 2015	TiPS	0–3	SibboV	Vantaa
15:00 EET		Report	Sved 7', 17', 47'	Stadium: Tikkurila TN; Attendance: 20

25 January 2015	FC Legirus Inter	1–0	HyPS	Vantaa
16:00 EET	Takki 76'	Report		Stadium: Kalmuuri TN; Attendance: 113

25 January 2015	HIFK/4	0–3	HIFK/3	Helsinki
16:15 EET		Report	Keski-Levijoki 41'; Anttonen 67'; Leinonen 76'	Stadium: Tali halli TN; Attendance: 26

28 January 2015	FC Peltirumpu	1–2	PEPO	Kouvola
19:30 EET	Hermunen 80'	Report	Juntunen 24'; Ahonen 59'	Stadium: Lehtomäki stadion Attendance: 31

1 February 2015	Peimari United	3–3 (a.e.t.) (4–1 p)	FC Inter/2	Paimio
17:15 EET	Salonen 26'; Lämsä 27'; Opoku 74'	Report	Kaplas 47', 80'; Risu 51'	Stadium: Paimio KHT; Attendance: 100; Referee: Markku Yli-Aho
	Penalties
	Neves (penalty scored); Lima (penalty scored); Anh (penalty scored); Hentula (penalty scored)		Kaplas (penalty scored); Almenoksa (penalty missed); Tabji (penalty missed)

== Second round ==
18 January 2015	Spartak Kajaani	3–0	JS Hercules	Kajaani
14:00 EET	Piirainen 5'; Nikkanen 10'; Liimatta 90+3'	Report		Stadium: Kajaanin Pallohalli; Attendance: 48; Referee: Jussi Viitanen

18 January 2015	SUMU/77	2–0	Atletico Malmi	Helsinki
16:15 EET	Fakeh 15'; Halhul 59'	Report		Stadium: Tali halli TN; Attendance: 100; Referee: Esa Kallio

18 January 2015	Nekalan Pallo	1–1 (a.e.t.) (4–2 p)	FC Rauma	Tampere
20:00 EET	Luokkala 79'	Report	Varvounis 39'	Stadium: Pirkkahalli; Attendance: 35; Referee: Juuso Jokinen
	Penalties
	Seppänen (penalty scored); Kareinen (penalty scored); Luokkala (penalty scored); Hyysalo (penalty scored)		Saari (penalty scored); Kyrkkö (penalty missed); Valtanen (penalty scored); Vainiola (penalty missed)

18 January 2015	PPJ/Taalerit	0–11	HIFK/2	Helsinki
20:15 EET		Report	Ulmanen 23'; Jussila 24', 28'; Axerud 25'; Lyytinen 46'; Ragi 66', 72', 75', 78'; Fagerström 68'; Fjäder 76'	Stadium: Tali halli TN; Referee: Sami Juselius

23 January 2015	SAPA/3	0–2	PPJ	Helsinki
20:30 EET		Report	Pakarinen 26'; Imaditdin 54'	Stadium: Kartano TN; Attendance: 4 Referee: Mikael Wahren

23 January 2015	Union Plaani/3	1–6	JIlves	Lahti
21:00 EET	Jäntti 64'	Report	Riikonen 7'; Hakola 32'; Särkivuori 46'; Lainkari 32'; Sinisalo 72' (pen.); Juven 80'	Stadium: Mukkulan halli Referee: Aki Tauriainen

24 January 2015	KelA	0–9	FC Espoo	Sipoo
16:30 EET		Report	Sadat; Sadat; Sadat; Sadat; Korhonen; Korhonen; Kettula; Kettula; Nurmi	Stadium: Söderkullan TN; Attendance: 35; Referee: Ossi Korvenaho

25 January 2015	FC Jäppärä	0–7	RiPS	Lahti
18:30 EET		Report	Elmgren 11', 22'; Hertell 39'; Palomäki 43', 48', 70'; O'shaughnessy 51'	Stadium: Mukkulan halli Attendance: 22; Referee: Juuso Vuorinen

25 January 2015	Kuopion Elo	2–4	SiPS	Kuopio
18:30 EET	Räsänen 7'; Lappalainen 69'	Report	Elmgren 18', 30'; Timonen 39'; Voutilainen 73'	Stadium: Kuopion kuplahalli Attendance: 26; Referee: Sampo Kettunen

30 January 2015	Oulun Tarmo	0–3	Tervarit-j Jupa	Oulu
18:30 EET		Report	Karppanen 21', 46', 66'	Stadium: Heinäpään jalkapallohalli Attendance: 52; Referee: Niko Hietala

30 January 2015	OPedot	2–0	LoPa	Nastola
20:00 EET	Hakanen 3'; Sundholm 14'	Report		Stadium: Pajulahden halli Attendance: 20; Referee: Jaakko Räsänen

31 January 2015	Laaksolahden Atleettiklubi	0–2	NuPS	Vihti
13:00 EET		Report	Kaalamo 30'; Nurminen 74'	Stadium: Ratapuisto halli Referee: Abdulkadir Koşar

31 January 2015	Sodankylän Pallo	0–0 (a.e.t.) (1–3 p)	OTP	Oulu
16:00 EET		Report		Stadium: Heinäpään jalkapallohalli Attendance: 70; Referee: Pietu Niinimäki
	Penalties
	Pettersson (penalty scored); Vattulainen (penalty missed); Onnela (penalty missed); Pulju (penalty missed)		Lohi (penalty scored); Kanniainen (penalty missed); Isola (penalty scored); Luoma-Aho (penalty scored)

1 February 2015	EPS	0–4	SexyPöxyt	Espoo
14:00 EET		Report	Puolakka 5', 34'; Valakari 52', 78'	Stadium: Espoonlahti 2 TN; Attendance: 100; Referee: Jan Ottosson

1 February 2015	KMPP	1–8	PK-35	Helsinki
19:30 EET	Matilainen 53'	Report	Rautiola 11', 46'; Kurvinen 24'; Mellanen 29'; Husu 35', 39'; Aweys 65'; Kjäll 79' (pen.)	Stadium: Töölö PK 6 TN; Attendance: 100; Referee: Leandro Decat

7 February 2015	Parolan Visa	0–2	JanPa	Hämeenlinna
13:00 EET		Report	Tuomela 32'; Paloposki 50'	Stadium: Pulleri tekonurmi Attendance: 95; Referee: Benjamin Koivuniemi

7 February 2015	SC Wolves	1–4	Peimari United	Hämeenlinna
18:30 EET	Allen 13'	Report	Salmiosalo 3', 57'; Neves 35', 90+3'	Stadium: Pulleri tekonurmi Attendance: 350; Referee: Samu Halmetniemi

7 February 2015	Virky	1–0	MU	Imatra
20:00 EET	Laitinen 75'	Report		Stadium: Aviasport Areena; Attendance: 10; Referee: Sauli Bai

8 February 2015	ToU	walkover	PK-37
20:45 EET		Report

9 February 2015	VaKP	0–4	Härmä	Valkeakoski
19:30 EET		Report	Lingman 3', 35'; 56' (o.g.); Tapola 58'	Stadium: Valkeakoski Sahara TN; Attendance: 278; Referee: Mika Kupiainen

9 February 2015	PEF	1–1 (a.e.t.) (7–6 p)	FC Spede	Vantaa
22:00 EET	O. Syväoja 40'	Report	Pesonen 76'	Stadium: Myyrmäki-halli; Attendance: 10; Referee: Gezim Arifi
	Penalties
	Henriksson (penalty scored); Buchert (penalty scored); O. Syväoja (penalty scored); Heinonen (penalty scored); J. Syväoja (penalty scored); Siren (penalty scored); Sorasalmi (penalty scored)		Pesonen (penalty scored); Suni (penalty scored); Leinonen (penalty scored); Vitikka (penalty scored); Hyttinen (penalty scored); Alén (penalty scored); Öhrnberg (penalty missed)

10 February 2015	EsPa	2–0	SibboV	Espoo
20:30 EET	Iiskola 31'; Lehtoranta 80+3'	Report		Stadium: Espoonlahti 1 TN; Attendance: 48; Referee: Janne Haikari

11 February 2015	Black Islanders	0–3	KPV/akatemia	Kokkola
18:00 EET		Report	Malwal 15'; Lindberg 17'; Emmanuel 73'	Stadium: Botniahalli; Referee: Marcus Beijar

11 February 2015	PP-70	1–4	TamU-K	Tampere
22:30 EET	Säde 78'	Report	Lehtimäki 3', 58', 79'; Kauppinen 24'	Stadium: Pirkkahalli C Attendance: 96; Referee: Veli-Matti Kanerva

12 February 2015	FC Kontu	1–1 (a.e.t.) (5–3 p)	LPS	Helsinki
21:00 EET	Thijssen 8'	Report	Kuhmola 6'	Stadium: Pallomylly TN; Attendance: 86; Referee: Topias Tuira
	Penalties
	Aromaa (penalty scored); Vuotovesi (penalty scored); Ruismäki (penalty scored); Miettinen (penalty scored); Minkkinen (penalty scored)		Rihtniemi (penalty scored); Hänninen (penalty scored); Laitila (penalty scored); Gawargis (penalty missed)

13 February 2015	FC Korso United	1–3	TuPS	Vantaa
20:05 EET	Hämäläinen 1'	Report	Fihlman 1'; M. Tiira 61'; Ståhle 75'	Stadium: Tikkurila TN; Attendance: 320; Referee: Milko Vikman

14 February 2015	Gnistan/Ogeli	4–1	Ponnistus	Helsinki
09:30 EET	Huurros 7'; Manselius 35'; Simola 47', 48'	Report	Palovesi 36'	Stadium: Tali halli TN; Attendance: 50; Referee: Sami Juselius

14 February 2015	PEPO	4–0	HaPK	Imatra
09:30 EET	Juntunen 49', 62'; Kuosmanen 60'; Härkönen 78'	Report		Stadium: Aviasport Areena; Attendance: 68; Referee: Jonas Lönn

14 February 2015	Club Latino Español	2–2 (a.e.t.) (2–3 p)	JFC	Helsinki
11:00 EET	Ekholm 80+'; Calderon 80+'	Report	Törmälä 80+' (pen.); Lågas 80+' (pen.)	Stadium: Tali halli TN; Referee: Gennaro Liguori
	Penalties
	León (penalty missed)

14 February 2015	FC Honka/3	0–2	Allianssi Vantaa	Espoo
14:00 EET		Report	Suomalainen 9'	Stadium: Tapiola 1 TN; Attendance: 10; Referee: Jan Ottosson

14 February 2015	Magen Akatemia	1–4	PaiHa	Paimio
15:00 EET	Vilo 13'	Report	Rinne 3'; Sarparanta 31', 61'; Haltia 72'	Stadium: Paimio KHT; Referee: Ville Käldström

14 February 2015	EBK	0–2	KPS	Jakobstad
15:00 EET		Report	Kangasvieri 10'; Paananen 40'	Stadium: Tellushallen; Referee: Daniel Enkvist

14 February 2015	Gnistan/2	0–5	Viikingit/2	Helsinki
16:30 EET		Report	Biga 3' (40); Wikström 47'; Nyström 69'; Remes 80' (pen.)	Stadium: Tali halli TN; Referee: Janne Ylijääskö

14 February 2015	I-HK	0–3	FC Legirus Inter	Vantaa
18:00 EET		Report	Sapov 4'; Ojeda 7'; Ocaña 80+2'	Stadium: Kalmuuri TN; Attendance: 140; Referee: Mika Saukkonen

14 February 2015	Ruisku	0–3	Töölön Taisto	Helsinki
18:30 EET		Report	Kortelainen 59'; Pulkkinen 74'; Digha 80+1'	Stadium: Tali halli TN; Referee: Toni Mustonen

14 February 2015	Jomala IK	1–0	VG-62	Eckerö
19:30 EET	Öström 29'	Report		Stadium: Eckeröhallen; Referee: Josef Fagerholm

14 February 2015	SAPA	3–0	AC Balls	Helsinki
20:00 EET	Vanhatalo 26', 61'; Bade 64'	Report		Stadium: Tali halli TN; Attendance: 40; Referee: Sami Juselius

15 February 2015	HIFK/3	1–3	MPS	Helsinki
18:30 EET	Kessey 8'	Report	Ketonen 26', 36'; Säynätkari 80+2'	Stadium: Kartano TN; Attendance: 25; Referee: Jarmo Luhtanen

15 February 2015	HJK/Lsalo	1–2	HPS	Helsinki
20:15 EET	Romppainen 65'	Report	Asp 20'; Laahanen 48'	Attendance: 16; Referee: Johan Holmqvist

27 February 2015	SUMU/sob	1–3	FC Hieho	Helsinki
20:30 EET	Lukkari 41'	Report	Viherä 12', 51'; Eloranta 30'	Stadium: Kartano TN; Attendance: 20; Referee: Kari Mantere

== Third round ==
17 February 2015	KPV	3–0	JBK	Kokkola
18:30 EET	Palosaari 7'; Mäki 16'; Känsälä 51'	Report		Stadium: Kippari Hall; Attendance: 170; Referee: Niklas Kankkonen

21 February 2015	AC Oulu	3–1	VIFK	Oulu
16:00 EET	Stafsula 5'; Tahvanainen 83'; Gerster-Peipinen 90+4'	Report	Linjala 81'	Stadium: Arina Arena; Attendance: 330; Referee: Harri Siniaalto

22 February 2015	HIFK/2	0–2	EsPa	Helsinki
20:00 EET		Report	Nikkola 57', 83'	Stadium: Tali halli TN; Attendance: 51; Referee: Levente Kadar

23 February 2015	SUMU/77	0–4	IF Gnistan	Helsinki
20:00 EET		Report	Rexhepi 49'; Pastila 66' (pen.), 81'; Koskinen 85'	Stadium: Kartano TN; Attendance: 100; Referee: Oliver Reitala

25 February 2015	OPedot	1–4	HPS	Nastola
19:30 EET	Hatamaa 45'	Report	Laahanen 20'; Asp 26', 28', 66'	Stadium: Pajulahti halli Attendance: 15; Referee: Juurinen Anssi

27 February 2015	ÅIFK	2–6	FC Jazz	Turku
17:00 EET	45+'; 65'	Report	Mäkelä 26', 55'; Santahuhta 40', 42'; Ahde 80', 86'	Stadium: Urheilupuiston yläkenttä

27 February 2015	Tervarit-j Jupa	1–2	KajHa	Oulu
19:00 EET	Keränen 41'	Report	Kemppainen 9', 48'	Stadium: Heinäpään jalkapallohalli Attendance: 107; Referee: Konstantin Lioutkovski

28 February 2015	PK-35	0–5	PK Keski-Uusimaa	Helsinki
08:45 EET		Report	Adriano 21'; Metso 30'; Haapalainen 39'; Haiko 52'; Lipsanen 73'	Stadium: Tali halli TN; Attendance: 80; Referee: Janne Suvensalmi

28 February 2015	JFC	1–5	Viikingit/2	Vantaa
09:30 EET	Vierula 40'	Report	Varila 6', 89'; Ivanov 56'; Kaukomaa 83'; Veijola 90+2'	Stadium: Myyrmäki Stadion; Attendance: 98; Referee: Abdulkadir Koşar

28 February 2015	Spartak Kajaani	0–2	PS Kemi	Kajaani
15:00 EET		Report	Jovović 52'; Ions 55'	Stadium: Kajaanin Pallohalli; Attendance: 95; Referee: Jarkko Kyllönen

28 February 2015	SiPS	2–0	JIlves	Kuopio
16:00 EET	Janhonen 79'; Berg 89'	Report		Stadium: Savon Sanomat Areena; Attendance: 30; Referee: Tuomas Saastamoinen

28 February 2015	Peimari United	1–2	PaiHa	Paimio
18:00 EET	Salmiosalo 52'	Report	Sarparanta 60', 74'	Stadium: Paimio KHT; Attendance: 500; Referee: Pasi Kallio

28 February 2015	Nekalan Pallo	1–5	TamU-K	Tampere
18:15 EET	Luokkala 45'	Report	Toiva 5'; Pelkola 20' (o.g.); Dakkaki 68', 85'; Rantanen 90'	Stadium: Pirkkahalli; Attendance: 228; Referee: Juuso Jokinen

1 March 2015	NJS	0–5	EIF	Nurmijärvi
15:00 EET		Report	Ekström 9'; Sevón 45'; Suoraniemi 49'; Kaufmann 79'; Brotkin 85'	Stadium: Klaukkala 1 TN; Attendance: 200; Referee: Dennis Antamo

1 March 2015	PEPO	3–1	FCV	Imatra
17:30 EET	Suoraniemi 21'; Demirel 90+1'; Särkkä 90+3'	Report	Kohonen 81' (pen.)	Stadium: Aviasport Areena; Attendance: 83; Referee: Niko Hänninen

1 March 2015	OTP	2–0	KPV/akatemia	Oulu
18:00 EET	Lohi 8'; Oikarinen 90+5'	Report		Stadium: Heinäpään jalkapallohalli Attendance: 50; Referee: Atte Räinä

2 March 2015	MPS	3–1	NuPS	Helsinki
20:00 EET	19' (o.g.); Je. Ketonen 55'; Putkonen 67'	Report	Räsänen 45'	Stadium: Kartano TN; Attendance: 50; Referee: Ifeoma Kulmala

3 March 2015	PEF	0–6	SexyPöxyt	Espoo
19:30 EET		Report	Syla 41', 69'; Valakari 53'; Lumivaara 79', 84'; Uusimäki 86'	Stadium: Laaksolahti TN; Attendance: 40; Referee: Gezim Arifi

3 March 2015	FC Futura	1–3	Atlantis FC	Sipoo
20:30 EET	Oikkonen 31'	Report	Saarenpää 15'; Kärki 44'; Cole 78'	Stadium: Söderkullan TN; Attendance: 88; Referee: Peiman Simani

4 March 2015	KPS	1–7	GBK	Kokkola
19:00 EET	Liedes 67'	Report	Curinga 9'; Tukeva 24'; Melarti 32', 45+1'; Hohenthal 48'; Smith 59' (pen.); Luokkala 81'	Stadium: Kippari Hall; Attendance: 156; Referee: Jani Aro

4 March 2015	KäPa	2–1 (a.e.t.)	FC Lahti Akatemia	Helsinki
19:30 EET	Ollila 45+1'; Mäkinen 94'	Report	Heinonen 48'	Stadium: Oulunkylä TN; Attendance: 100; Referee: Antti Munukka

5 March 2015	FC Legirus Inter	5–0	RiPS	Vantaa
20:15 EET	Halonen 8'; Ahonen 29'; Ojeda 36'; Ocaña 60'; Kaitila 87'	Report		Stadium: Kalmuuri TN; Attendance: 248; Referee: Gezim Arifi

6 March 2015	P-Iirot	2–5 (a.e.t.)	FC Haka	Rauma
18:00 EET	Valtanen 78'; Setänen 89'	Report	Multanen 67', 82', 119', 120+2'; Mäkelä 82'	Stadium: Äijänsuo stadion Attendance: 458; Referee: Vesa Hätilä

6 March 2015	Härmä	0–3 (a.e.t.)	MuSa	Hämeenlinna
19:30 EET		Report	Vainionpää 97', 114'; Pyyranta 107'	Stadium: Pulleri tekonurmi Attendance: 64; Referee: Teemu Pylkkänen

6 March 2015	FC Hieho	0–12	FC Honka	Espoo
20:00 EET		Report	Porokara 9', 20', 22'; Weckström 15', 30', 43'; Inutile 25', 73', 80'; Jouini 41'; Heiska 71', 77'	Stadium: Esport Arena; Attendance: 267; Referee: Juho Luukkanen

6 March 2015	TPV	2–4	TPS	Tampere
20:00 EET	Korsunov 68'; Jokinen 85'	Report	Aalto 25', 79' (pen.); Tenho 28'; Hyyrynen 90+4'	Stadium: Pirkkahalli; Referee: Lassi Siukkola

7 March 2015	FC Kontu	1–6	FC Myllypuro	Helsinki
10:45 EET	Rashid 59'	Report	Konsa 17', 19'; Ndikumana 39'; Nlate 69'; Olsoni 64'; Nikolai Dubinin 90+1'	Stadium: Tali halli TN; Attendance: 81; Referee: Mohammed Al-Emara

7 March 2015	PPJ	0–3	PK-35 Vantaa	Vantaa
15:00 EET		Report	Kuqi 47', 71'; Ademaj 64'	Stadium: Myyrmäki Halli; Referee: Juuso Vuorinen

7 March 2015	Virky	1–2 (a.e.t.)	MP	Lappeenranta
19:00 EET	Tanninen 84'	Report	Iivanainen 35'; Klimov 109'	Stadium: Amis (jpn); Attendance: 110; Referee: Jussi Vainikka

7 March 2015	SAPA	2–1	FC Espoo	Helsinki
19:45 EET	Rahkonen 54'; Känsäkoski 90+6'	Report	Louhisto 9'	Stadium: Tali halli TN; Attendance: 2 Referee: Mohammed Al-Emara

8 March 2015	JanPa	1–0	Jomala IK	Hämeenlinna
13:00 EET	Suhonen 35'	Report		Stadium: Pulleri tekonurmi Attendance: 54; Referee: Sakari Kallio

8 March 2015	PK-37	0–3	JJK	Kuopio
17:30 EET		Report	Hilska 26', 38'; Leppänen 81'	Stadium: Savon Sanomat Areena; Attendance: 77; Referee: Sami Kekäläinen

8 March 2015	Allianssi Vantaa	0–1 (a.e.t.)	BK-46	Tuusula
19:00 EET		Report	Brain 113'	Stadium: Tuusula UK TN; Attendance: 82; Referee: Sami Katko

8 March 2015	Gnistan/Ogeli	1–7	Töölön Taisto	Helsinki
20:00 EET	Pitkänen 8'	Report	Lassila 21', 55'; Pesonen 38'; Pulkkinen 40'; Digha 45+1'; Kortelainen 87', 88'	Stadium: Tali halli TN; Attendance: 125; Referee: Juhani Karstila

9 March 2015	TuPS	2–0	JäPS	Tuusula
20:00 EET	Kunttu 53'; Pitkänen 56'	Report		Stadium: Tuusula TN; Attendance: 200; Referee: Jari Pylvänäinen

JIPPO	walkover	MYPA
	Report

== Fourth round ==
13 March 2015	Töölön Taisto	0–1	FC Haka	Helsinki
19:00 EET		Report	Multanen 62'	Stadium: Töölö PK 6 TN; Referee: Jesse Aalto

13 March 2015	KajHa	2–0	SiPS	Kajaani
19:30 EET	Vuorenmaa 26'; Seppänen 76'	Report		Stadium: Kajaanin Pallohalli; Attendance: 65; Referee: Ghazi Ben Ameur

14 March 2015	PaiHa	0–4	FC Honka	Paimio
15:00 EET		Report	Porokara 2'; Jouini 62'; Puuskari 87', 90+2'	Stadium: Paimio KHT; Attendance: 400; Referee: Arton Ibrahimi

14 March 2015	KPV	3–0	FF Jaro	Kokkola
15:00 EET	Vaganov 27' (o.g.); Palosaari 60', 65'	Report		Stadium: Santahaka keinonurmi 1 Attendance: 429; Referee: Toni Pohjoismäki

14 March 2015	TPS	2–0	FC Jazz	Turku
16:00 EET	Hradecký 34'; Rähmönen 90'	Report		Stadium: Urheilupuiston yläkenttä Attendance: 520; Referee: Pasi Kallio

14 March 2015	FC Myllypuro	0–1 (a.e.t.)	PK Keski-Uusimaa	Helsinki
18:00 EET		Report	Adriano 112'	Stadium: Kartano TN; Referee: Mohammed Al-Emara

14 March 2015	KäPa	1–1 (a.e.t.) (2–4 p)	PK-35 Vantaa	Helsinki
18:00 EET	Ollila 6'	Report	Seferi 89'	Stadium: Oulunkylä TN; Attendance: 130; Referee: Oliver Reitala
	Penalties
	Spangar (penalty scored); Ollila (penalty missed); Alavaikko (penalty scored); Lahikainen (penalty missed)		Rasimus (penalty scored); Heinonen (penalty scored); Seferi (penalty scored); Manev (penalty scored)

14 March 2015	Atlantis FC	1–4	EIF	Helsinki
20:30 EET	Saarenpää 49'	Report	Sevón 30', 34'; Estlander 48' (pen.); Bushi 90+1'	Stadium: Tali halli TN; Attendance: 97; Referee: Topias Tuira

15 March 2015	PEPO	0–6	KuPS	Lappeenranta
12:00 EET		Report	Sirbiladze 24', 60'; Vartiainen 56'; Nissilä 75'; Poutiainen 87'; Pennanen 90'	Stadium: Amis (jpn); Attendance: 329; Referee: Joonas Lönn

15 March 2015	SexyPöxyt	1–2	Gnistan	Espoo
15:00 EET	Syla 74'	Report	Rexhepi 61'; Oras 62'	Stadium: Laaksolahti TN; Attendance: 100; Referee: Hausin Fathulla

15 March 2015	GBK	1–4	PS Kemi	Kokkola
15:00 EET	Melarti 56'	Report	Ions 29'; Jovović 49', 77'; Tshibasu 78'	Stadium: Santahaka keinonurmi Attendance: 153; Referee: Tommi Wiklund

16 March 2015	OTP	0–2	AC Oulu	Oulu
18:30 EET		Report	Mäkäräinen 30'; Jokelainen 68'	Stadium: Heinäpään jalkapallohalli Attendance: 435; Referee: Harri Siniaalto

16 March 2015	FC Legirus Inter	0–4	BK-46	Vantaa
20:00 EET		Report	Brain 17', 51'; Kibona 47', 71'	Stadium: Kalmuuri TN; Attendance: 400; Referee: Juuso Vuorinen

17 March 2015	EsPa	3–0	HPS	Espoo
18:30 EET	Happonen 8'; Joonatan 49' (o.g.); Pirhonen 58'	Report		Stadium: Matinkylä 2 TN; Attendance: 80; Referee: Dennis Antamo

17 March 2015	MP	2–2 (a.e.t.) (4–2 p)	KTP	Mikkeli
18:30 EET	Voutilainen 91'; Klimov 112'	Report	van Gelderen 107'; Kaivonurmi 109'	Stadium: Urpola (jpn); Attendance: 207; Referee: Niko Hänninen
	Penalties
	Iivanainen (penalty missed); Klimov (penalty scored); Popovitch (penalty scored); Hanley (penalty scored); Haikonen (penalty scored)		Gruborovics (penalty missed); Äijälä (penalty missed); Kaivonurmi (penalty scored); McFaul (penalty scored)

18 March 2015	TuPS	2–2 (a.e.t.) (6–7 p)	Viikingit/2	Tuusula
20:30 EET	Pitkänen 88'; J. Tiira 90+4'	Report	Wikström 25'; Kurittu 71'	Stadium: Tuusula UK TN; Attendance: 100; Referee: Juho Luukkanen
	Penalties
	M. Tiira (penalty scored); Honkanen (penalty scored); J. Tiira (penalty scored); Lehtonen (penalty scored); Närhi (penalty missed); Ravi (penalty scored); Pitkänen (penalty scored); Vuollet (penalty missed); Ketolainen (penalty missed)		Bouroussi (penalty scored); Wikström (penalty scored); Ahola (penalty scored); Varila (penalty scored); Kaukomaa (penalty missed); Maunu (penalty scored); Veijola (penalty scored); Zogejani (penalty missed); Kuusisto (penalty scored)

19 March 2015	TamU-K	0–12	IFK Mariehamn	Tampere
19:00 EET		Report	Span 4'; Lyyski 6'; Forsell 19', 74', 80'; Assis 21'; Ibrahim 42'; Kojola 69', 87'; Orgill 79', 88', 90'	Stadium: Pirkkahalli C Attendance: 352; Referee: Oskari Hämäläinen

20 March 2015	SAPA	0–1	MuSa	Helsinki
20:00 EET		Report	Vainionpää 71'	Stadium: Töölö PK 6 TN; Attendance: 78; Referee: Santeri Nieminen

21 March 2015	JIPPO	0–3	JJK	Joensuu
15:00 EET		Report	Manninen 58'; Kari 73'; Lähitie 90+2'	Stadium: Koillispuiston tekonurmi Attendance: 152; Referee: Ville Nevalainen

22 March 2015	JanPa	0–5	MPS	Hämeenlinna
17:30 EET		Report	Hannula 36'; Hampaala 38'; Je. Ketonen 48'; Putkonen 58'; Jo. Ketonen 64'	Stadium: Pulleri tekonurmi Attendance: 78; Referee: Veli-Matti Kanerva

== Fifth round ==
27 March 2015	Viikingit/2	1–7	PK-35 Vantaa	Helsinki
18:00 EET	Veijola 4'	Report	Rasimus 10'; P. Couñago 33', 67'; Y. Couñago 48'; Seferi 70'; Kuqi 87', 89'	Stadium: Kartano TN; Referee: Jari Järvinen

28 March 2015	MuSa	1–1 (a.e.t.) (3–0 p)	EIF	Pori
13:15 EET	Vainionpää 90'	Report	Suoraniemi 45+2'	Stadium: Pori Urheilukeskus TN; Attendance: 159; Referee: Marko Grönholm
	Penalties
	Junnila (penalty scored); Salo (penalty scored); Vallin (penalty scored)		Kaufmann (penalty missed); Suoraniemi (penalty missed); Ekström (penalty missed)

28 March 2015	MPS	0–2	FC Lahti	Helsinki
16:00 EET		Report	Hauhia 18'; Gela 31'	Stadium: Pihlajamäki TN; Attendance: 415; Referee: Oliver Reitala

28 March 2015	KajHa	0–5	KPV	Kajaani
16:00 EET		Report	Heiermann 18'; Huuhka 25', 44'; Myntti 39', 67'	Stadium: Kajaanin Pallohalli; Attendance: 100; Referee: Sami Kekäläinen

29 March 2015	MP	1–2 (a.e.t.)	PK Keski-Uusimaa	Mikkeli
14:30 EET	Lankinen 34'	Report	Haiko 25'; Adriano 105'	Stadium: Urpola (jpn); Referee: Jussi Vainikka

29 March 2015	EsPa	0–5	IFK Mariehamn	Espoo
15:00 EET		Report	Orgill 33', 37', 60', 78'; Ekhalie 63'	Stadium: Matinkylä 2 TN; Attendance: 286; Referee: Mikko Mörö

1 April 2015	JJK	0–1	PS Kemi	Jyväskylä
18:00 EET		Report	Bitsindou 83'	Stadium: Vehkalampi 2 Attendance: 286; Referee: Kalle Mäkinen

1 April 2015	IF Gnistan	1–2	BK-46	Helsinki
19:30 EET	Vuorela 57'	Report	Kibona 27'; Jean Carlo 42'	Stadium: Oulunkylä TN; Attendance: 164; Referee: Antti Munukka

2 April 2015	TPS	1–3	FC Inter	Turku
17:00 EET	Peltola 30'	Report	Hambo 19', 61'; Ojala 80'	Stadium: Urheilupuiston yläkenttä Attendance: 1,069; Referee: Petri Viljanen

2 April 2015	FC Haka	3–2	FC Honka	Valkeakoski
17:00 EET	Mäkelä 20', 55'; Liikonen 59'	Report	Weckström 37', 45+13' (pen.)	Stadium: Tehtaan kenttä Attendance: 750; Referee: Oskari Hämäläinen

2 April 2015	AC Oulu	2–1	VPS	Oulu
17:00 EET	Heikkilä 69'; Stafsula 76'	Report	Mäkelä 11'	Stadium: Arina Arena; Attendance: 522; Referee: Ville Nevalainen

4 April 2015	SJK	1–2	KuPS	Seinäjoki
15:00 EET	Brown 45'	Report	Pennanen 17' (pen.); Hakola 64'	Stadium: Jouppilanvuori; Attendance: 499; Referee: Jani Laaksonen

== Sixth round ==
15 April 2015	KuPS	2–1	FC Lahti	Kuopio
18:30 EET	Savolainen 49'; Pennanen 75'	Report	Rafael 90+1'	Stadium: Savon Sanomat Areena; Attendance: 1,133; Referee: Jari Järvinen

15 April 2015	PK-35 Vantaa	1–2 (a.e.t.)	HJK	Vantaa
18:30 EET	Manev 83'	Report	Lod 66'; Havenaar 97'	Stadium: Myyrmäki Stadion; Attendance: 1,772; Referee: Petri Viljanen

16 April 2015	FC Ilves	0–2	IFK Mariehamn	Valkeakoski
16:00 EET		Report	Span 16'; Orgill 90'	Stadium: Tehtaan kenttä Attendance: 339; Referee: Antti Munukka

16 April 2015	KPV	0–2 (a.e.t.)	HIFK	Kokkola
18:00 EET		Report	Terävä 115'; Korhonen 120+2'	Stadium: Santahaka keinonurmi Attendance: 570; Referee: Ville Nevalainen

16 April 2015	AC Oulu	3–3 (a.e.t.) (4–3 p)	PS Kemi	Oulu
18:30 EET	Stafsula 13'; Tahvanainen 33'; Marzuoli 90+4'	Report	Ions 21', 66'; Jovović 52'	Stadium: Arina Arena; Attendance: 600; Referee: Kalle Mäkinen
	Penalties
	Vandell (penalty scored); Hietanen (penalty scored); Heikkilä (penalty scored); Gerster-Peipinen (penalty scored); Stafsula (penalty missed)		Jovović (penalty scored); Saarinen (penalty missed); Ions (penalty scored); Moilanen (penalty scored); Djaló (penalty missed)

16 April 2015	FC Inter	7–3	RoPS	Turku
18:30 EET	Onovo 15', 19', 45+1', 71'; Matoukou 81'; Duah 85'; Belica 90+1'	Report	Yaghoubi 45+1'; Kokko 72', 76'	Stadium: Veritas Stadion; Attendance: 683; Referee: Petteri Kari

16 April 2015	FC Haka	2–2 (a.e.t.) (4–3 p)	MuSa	Valkeakoski
19:00 EET	Multanen 10'; Sanevuori 42'	Report	Vainionpää 88'; Tuuri 90+1'	Stadium: Tehtaan kenttä Attendance: 563; Referee: Lassi Siukkola
	Penalties
	Multanen (penalty scored); Mäkelä (penalty scored); Sanevuori (penalty missed); Popovitch (penalty scored); Pirttijoki (penalty missed); Mäenpää (penalty scored)		Salo (penalty scored); Toivonen (penalty missed); Tuuri (penalty missed); Kivimäki (penalty scored); Vainionpää (penalty scored); Jylli (penalty missed)

16 April 2015	PK Keski-Uusimaa	4–1 (a.e.t.)	BK-46	Kerava
20:00 EET	Haapalainen 80'; Schwalenstöcker 99', 104'; Haiko 105+2'	Report	33' (o.g.)	Stadium: Kalevan UP TN; Attendance: 452; Referee: Mikko Mörö

== Quarter-finals ==
26 April 2015	KuPS	4–0	PK Keski-Uusimaa	Kuopio
16:00 EET	Sirbiladze 18', 21', 58'; Pennanen 42' (pen.)	Report		Stadium: Savon Sanomat Areena; Attendance: 1,023; Referee: Ville Nevalainen

26 April 2015	FC Haka	1–3	HJK	Valkeakoski
16:00 EET	Lähdesmäki 49'	Report	Savage 18', 52'; Tanaka 90+1'	Stadium: Tehtaan kenttä Attendance: 1,102; Referee: Marko Grönholm

26 April 2015	HIFK	0–2	FC Inter	Helsinki
16:00 EET		Report	Hambo 43', 84'	Stadium: Töölö Stadion; Attendance: 616; Referee: Dennis Antamo

26 April 2015	IFK Mariehamn	4–1	AC Oulu	Mariehamn
16:00 EET	Orgill 45', 64'; Lyyski 76'; Span 90+1'	Report	Tahvanainen 20'	Stadium: Wiklöf Holding Arena; Attendance: 786; Referee: Mattias Gestranius

== Semi-finals ==
15 August 2015	IFK Mariehamn	5–1	HJK	Mariehamn
15:00	Assis 3', 67'; Orgill 33'; Tammilehto 50'; Forsell 52'	Report	Tanaka 47'	Stadium: Wiklöf Holding Arena; Attendance: 1,114; Referee: Marko Grönholm

15 August 2015	FC Inter	1–1 (3–2 p)	KuPS	Turku
15:00	Gnabouyou 55'	Report	Bowen 34'	Stadium: Veritas Stadion; Attendance: 1,069; Referee: Jari Järvinen
	Penalties
	Aho (penalty scored); Gnabouyou (penalty missed); Belica (penalty scored); Lehtonen (penalty missed); Onovo (penalty scored)		Poutiainen (penalty scored); Bowen (penalty missed); Markić (penalty missed); Rannankari (penalty scored); Nissilä (penalty missed)

== Final ==
26 September 2015	FC Inter	1–2	IFK Mariehamn	Valkeakoski
14:45	Gnabouyou 88'	Report	Assis 45', 59'	Stadium: Tehtaan kenttä Attendance: 3,017; Referee: Dennis Antamo
