= Riku Sjöroos =

Finnish footballer (born 1995)

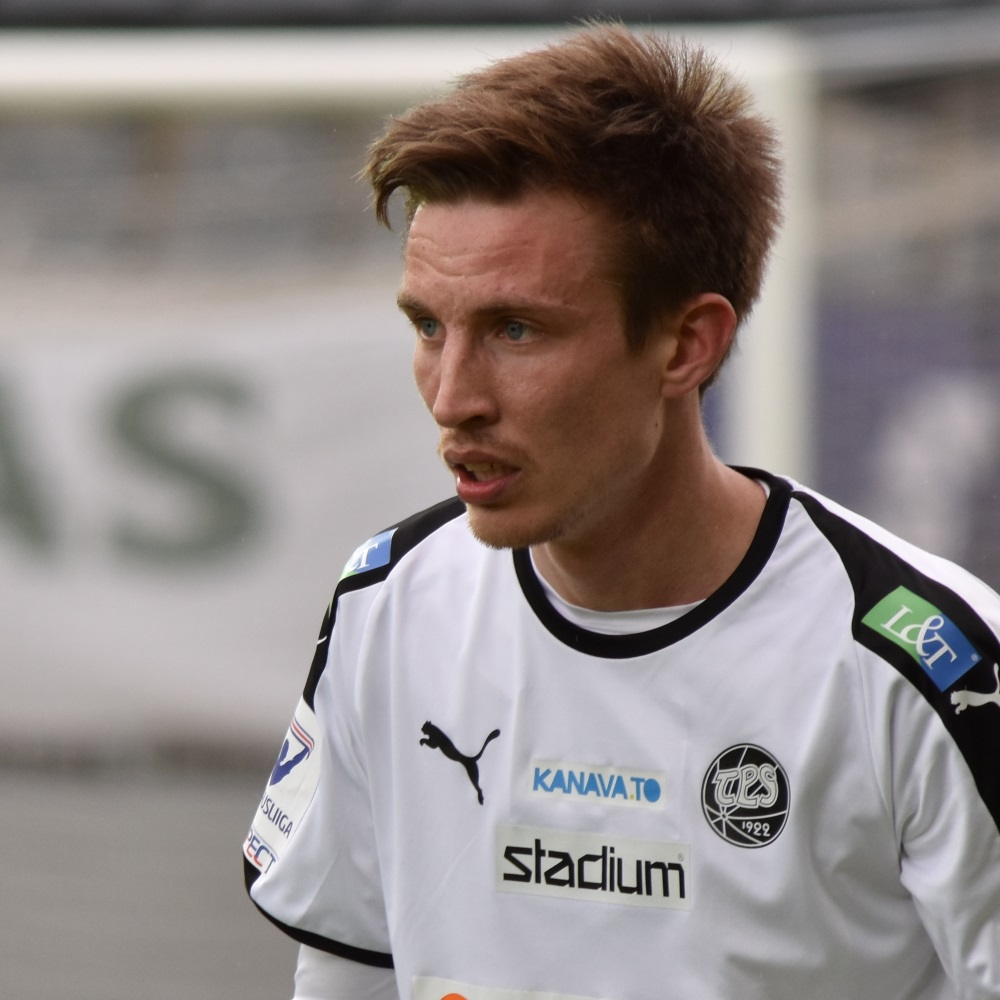
- Sjöroos with TPS in 2018

Personal information
- Date of birth: 10 March 1995 (age 31)
- Place of birth: Turku, Finland
- Height: 1.82 m (6 ft 0 in)
- Position: Winger

Team information
- Current team: Peimari United

Youth career
- TPS

Senior career*
Years	Team	Apps	(Gls)
2012–2013	Åbo IFK	17	(3)
2013–2018	TPS	102	(15)
2014	→ Åbo IFK (loan)	20	(3)
2019–2023	IFK Mariehamn	102	(5)
2024	Haka	0	(0)
2024	TPS	24	(5)
2025–	Peimari United	0	(0)
- * Club domestic league appearances and goals as of 26 October 2024

Riku Sjöroos (born 10 March 1995) is a Finnish footballer who plays as a winger for Peimari United in Kolmonen.

== Career ==
Sjöroos signed with IFK Mariehamn for the 2019 season. He returned to IFK Mariehamn for the 2022 season on 19 January 2022.

On 4 April 2024, Sjöroos returned to his hometown Turku after signing with his former club Turun Palloseura (TPS) on a one-year deal.

== Career statistics ==
As of 26 October 2024

Club	Season	League			Finnish Cup		League cup (Note: Includes Finnish League Cup and Ykkösliigacup)		Other		Total	
Club	Season	Division	Apps	Goals	Apps	Goals	Apps	Goals	Apps	Goals	Apps	Goals
Åbo IFK	2012	Kakkonen	0	0	—		—		—		0	0
Åbo IFK	2013	Kakkonen	17	3	—		—		—		17	3
Åbo IFK	Total		17	3	—		—		—		17	3
TPS	2013	Veikkausliiga	4	0	—		1	0	—		5	0
TPS	2014	Veikkausliiga	1	0	0	0	3	0	—		4	0
TPS	2015	Ykkönen	25	1	—		—		—		25	1
TPS	2016	Ykkönen	23	8	—		—		2 (Note: Appearance(s) in Promotion/Relegation play-offs)	0	25	8
TPS	2017	Ykkönen	24	2	4	0	—		—		28	2
TPS	2018	Veikkausliiga	25	4	4	1	—		2	0	31	5
TPS	Total		102	15	8	1	4	0	4	0	118	16
Åbo IFK (loan)	2014	Kakkonen	20	3	—		—		—		20	3
IFK Mariehamn	2019	Veikkausliiga	27	0	8	1	—		—		35	1
IFK Mariehamn	2020	Veikkausliiga	19	1	5	0	—		—		24	1
IFK Mariehamn	2021	Veikkausliiga	13	0	3	0	—		—		16	0
IFK Mariehamn	2022	Veikkausliiga	21	2	3	0	3	1	—		27	3
IFK Mariehamn	2023	Veikkausliiga	22	2	4	0	5	0	2	0	33	2
IFK Mariehamn	Total		102	5	23	1	8	1	2	0	135	7
Haka	2024	Veikkausliiga	0	0	0	0	2	0	—		2	0
TPS	2024	Ykkösliiga	24	5	2	0	3	0	—		29	5
Peimari United	2025	Kolmonen	0	0	0	0	—		—		0	0
Career Total			264	31	33	2	17	1	6	0	320	34
