= Vartiainen =

Vartiainen is a Finnish surname. Notable people with the surname include:

- Aimo Vartiainen (1927–2023), Finnish alpine skier
- Hannes Vartiainen (born 1980), Finnish filmmaker
- Jenni Vartiainen (born 1983), Finnish pop singer
- Joel Vartiainen (born 1994), Finnish footballer
- Juhana Vartiainen (born 1958), Finnish politician
- Taavi Vartiainen (born 1994), Finnish former ice hockey player
- Tuomas Vartiainen (born 1996), Finnish ice hockey player
- Varre Vartiainen (born 1974), Finnish guitarist
- Veikko Vartiainen (1913–1981), Finnish equestrian
