= Sami Rähmönen =

Finnish footballer (born 1987)

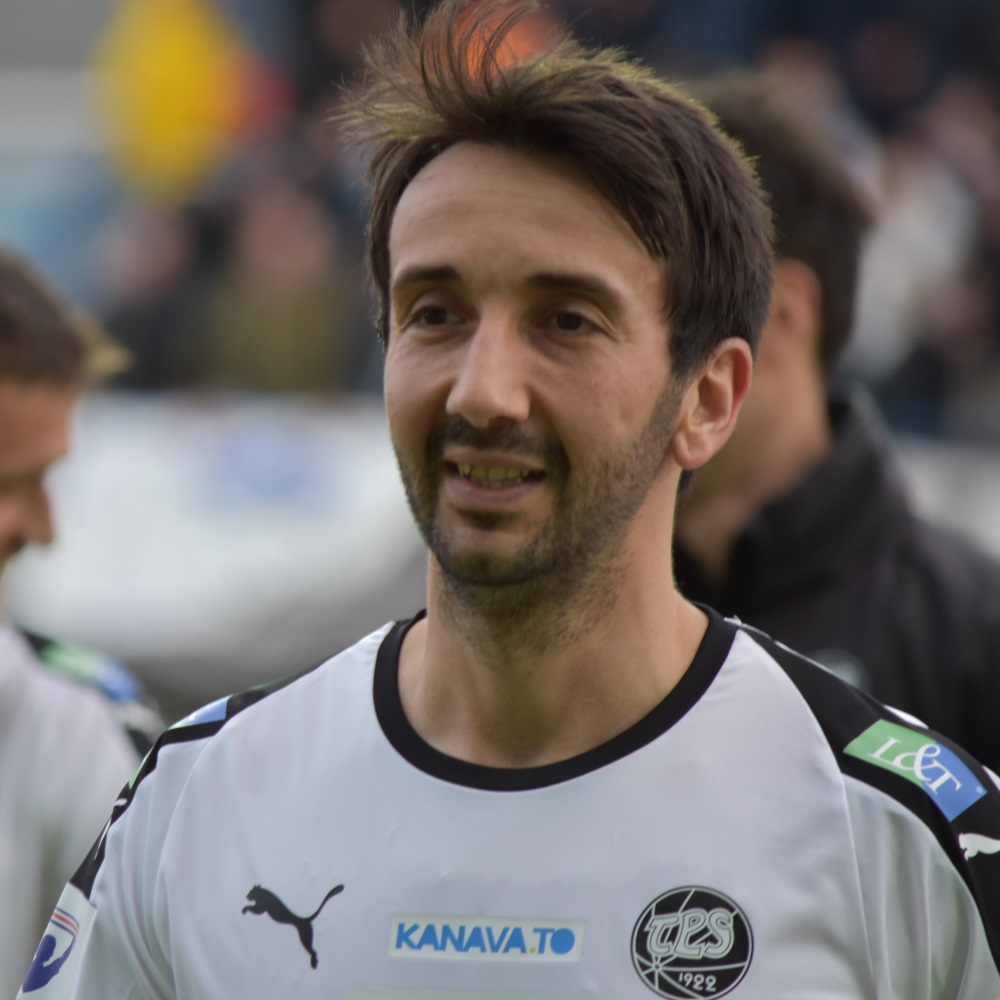
- Sami Rähmönen in Turku 2018.

Personal information
- Full name: Faisal Sami Adnan Rähmönen
- Date of birth: 19 April 1987 (age 39)
- Place of birth: Turku, Finland
- Height: 1.84 m (6 ft 0 in)
- Position: Right back

Youth career
- TPS Turku

Senior career*
Years	Team	Apps	(Gls)
2005–2020	TPS Turku	377	(19)
- * Club domestic league appearances and goals as of 23:40, 24 December 2020 (UTC)

Faisal Sami Adnan Rähmönen (born 19 April 1987 Turku) is a Finnish retired footballer who represented Turun Palloseura in his whole career. He mostly played as a right back, but was also useful as a winger or central midfielder.

33-year-old Rähmönen retired from his professional career at the end of 2020.

== Career statistics ==
As of 20 May 2025

Appearances and goals by club, season and competition
Club	Season	League			National cup (Note: Includes Suomen Cup)		League cup (Note: Includes Finnish League Cup)		Continental		Total	
Club	Season	Division	Apps	Goals	Apps	Goals	Apps	Goals	Apps	Goals	Apps	Goals
TPS Turku	2005	Veikkausliiga	2	0	1	0	–		–		3	0
TPS Turku	2006	Veikkausliiga	23	1	–		–		–		23	1
TPS Turku	2007	Veikkausliiga	13	0	–		–		–		13	0
TPS Turku	2008	Veikkausliiga	26	1	–		–		4 (Note: Appearances in UEFA Intertoto Cup)	0	30	1
TPS Turku	2009	Veikkausliiga	26	0	1	0	4	0	–		31	0
TPS Turku	2010	Veikkausliiga	26	0	3	0	1	0	4 (Note: Appearances in UEFA Europa League)	0	34	0
TPS Turku	2011	Veikkausliiga	29	2	0	0	1	0	1	0	31	2
TPS Turku	2012	Veikkausliiga	32	0	1	0	8	0	–		41	0
TPS Turku	2013	Veikkausliiga	30	0	1	0	8	0	2	0	41	0
TPS Turku	2014	Veikkausliiga	26	3	2	0	1	0	–		29	3
TPS Turku	2015	Ykkönen	25	1	2	1	–		–		27	2
TPS Turku	2016	Ykkönen	29	2	2	0	–		–		31	2
TPS Turku	2017	Ykkönen	25	2	3	0	–		–		28	2
TPS Turku	2018	Veikkausliiga	28	2	5	0	–		–		33	2
TPS Turku	2019	Ykkönen	20	3	1	1	–		–		21	4
TPS Turku	2020	Veikkausliiga	17	0	7	1	–		–		24	1
TPS Turku	Total		377	17	29	3	23	0	11	0	440	20
KaaPo	2021	Kakkonen	11	1	–		–		–		11	1
TPS II	2022	Kolmonen	13	0	–		–		–		13	0
Peimari United	2023	Kolmonen	19	4	–		–		–		19	4
Peimari United	2024	Kolmonen	16	4	–		–		–		16	4
Peimari United	2025	Kolmonen	3	0	–		–		–		3	0
Peimari United	Total		38	8	0	0	0	0	0	0	38	8
Career total			439	26	29	3	23	0	11	0	502	29
