= Kosta Manev =

Macedonian footballer (born 1993)

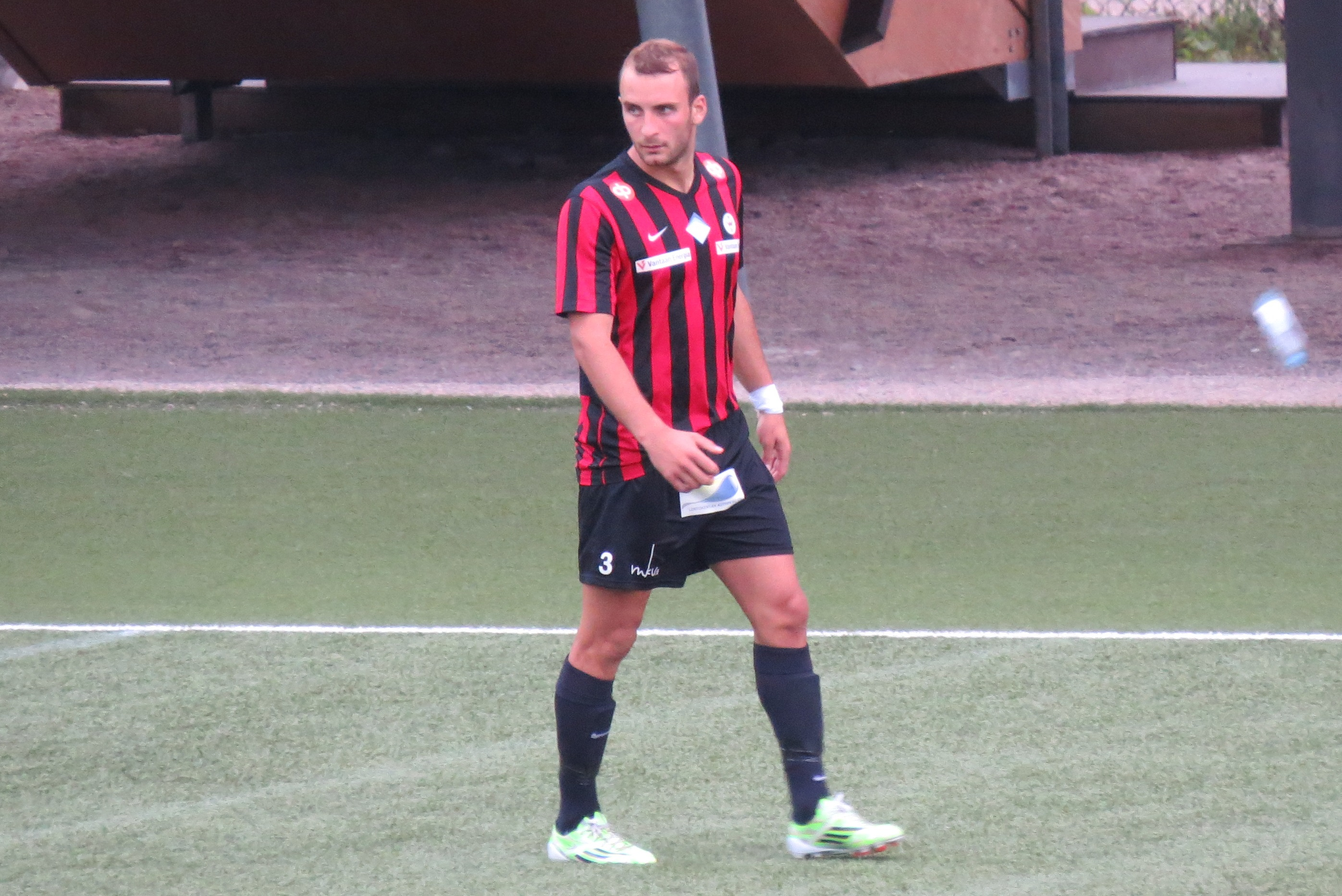
- Manev in 2015

Personal information
- Date of birth: 7 April 1993 (age 33)
- Place of birth: Radoviš, Macedonia
- Height: 1.82 m (6 ft 0 in)
- Position: Defender

Senior career*
Years	Team	Apps	(Gls)
2010–2012	Klubi-04	28	(0)
2013–2014	PK-35 Vantaa	32	(0)
2014	Viikingit	3	(0)
2014	Honka	11	(0)
2015–2016	PK-35 Vantaa	33	(2)
2016–2017	Inter Turku	33	(1)
2018	PS Kemi	14	(0)
2018–2019	Vardar	29	(0)
2019–2020	Velež Mostar	19	(0)
2021–2023	Akademija Pandev	41	(3)
2023	Al-Khaldiya		
2023–2024	Makedonija GP	26	(0)
2024	AP Brera Strumica	8	(0)
- * Club domestic league appearances and goals as of 8 December 2024

Kosta Manev (Macedonian: Коста Манев; born 7 April 1993) is a Macedonian professional footballer who plays as a defender.

== Career ==
Manev has played for Klubi-04, PK-35 Vantaa, Viikingit, Honka, Inter Turku and PS Kemi.

After spending his entire senior career in Finland, Manev returned to Macedonia in summer 2018 and signed a one-year contract with FK Vardar.

On 27 July 2019, he signed a one-year contract with Premier League of Bosnia and Herzegovina club FK Velež Mostar. Manev made his official debut for Velež on 10 August 2019, in a 0–0 away league draw against FK Sloboda Tuzla. He left Velež after his contract with the club expired in June 2020.

After playing for Al-Khaldiya, he signed for FK Makedonija G.P. for the 2023–24 season.

== Personal life ==
Originally from Radoviš, Manev moved to Finland in 2009. He has also acquired a Finnish citizenship.

== Career statistics ==
As of 2 October 2024.

Appearances and goals by club, season and competition
Club	Season	League			National cup (Note: Includes Suomen Cup, Macedonian Cup)		Other		Continental		Total	
Club	Season	Division	Apps	Goals	Apps	Goals	Apps	Goals	Apps	Goals	Apps	Goals
Klubi 04	2011	Kakkonen	4	0	–		–		–		4	0
Klubi 04	2012	Kakkonen	24	0	2	0	–		–		26	0
Klubi 04	Total		28	0	2	0	0	0	0	0	30	0
PK-35 Vantaa	2013	Ykkönen	20	0	3	0	–		–		23	0
PK-35 Vantaa	2014	Ykkönen	12	0	1	0	–		–		13	0
PK-35 Vantaa	Total		32	0	4	0	0	0	0	0	36	0
Viikingit	2014	Ykkönen	3	0	–		–		–		3	0
Honka	2014	Veikkausliiga	11	0	–		–		–		11	0
PK-35 Vantaa	2015	Ykkönen	24	2	4	1	–		–		28	3
PK-35 Vantaa	2016	Veikkausliiga	9	0	4	0	4 (Note: Includes Finnish League Cup)	0	–		17	0
PK-35 Vantaa	Total		33	2	8	1	4	0	0	0	45	3
Inter Turku	2016	Veikkausliiga	12	2	0	0	0	0	–		12	2
Inter Turku	2017	Veikkausliiga	21	1	7	0	–		–		28	1
Inter Turku	Total		33	3	7	0	0	0	0	0	40	3
PS Kemi	2018	Veikkausliiga	14	0	–		–		–		14	0
Vardar	2018–19	Macedonian First League	27	0	0	0	–		2 (Note: Includes UEFA Europa League)	0	29	0
Velež Mostar	2019–20	Bosnian Premier League	19	0	–		–		–		19	0
Akademija Pandev	2020–21	Macedonian First League	11	1	2	0	–		–		13	1
Akademija Pandev	2021–22	Macedonian First League	24	2	0	0	–		–		24	2
Akademija Pandev	2022–23	Macedonian First League	5	0	0	0	–		–		5	0
Akademija Pandev	Total		40	2	2	0	0	0	0	0	42	2
Al-Khaldiya	2022–23	Bahraini Premier League					–		–			
FK Makedonija G.P.	2023–24	Macedonian First League	25	0	3	0	–		0 (Note: Includes UEFA Europa Conference League)	0	28	3
AP Brera Strumica	2024–25	Macedonian First League	4	0	0	0	–		–		4	0
Career total			269	7	26	1	4	0	2	0	301	8
