= Solomon Duah =

Finnish-Ghanaian footballer (born 1993)

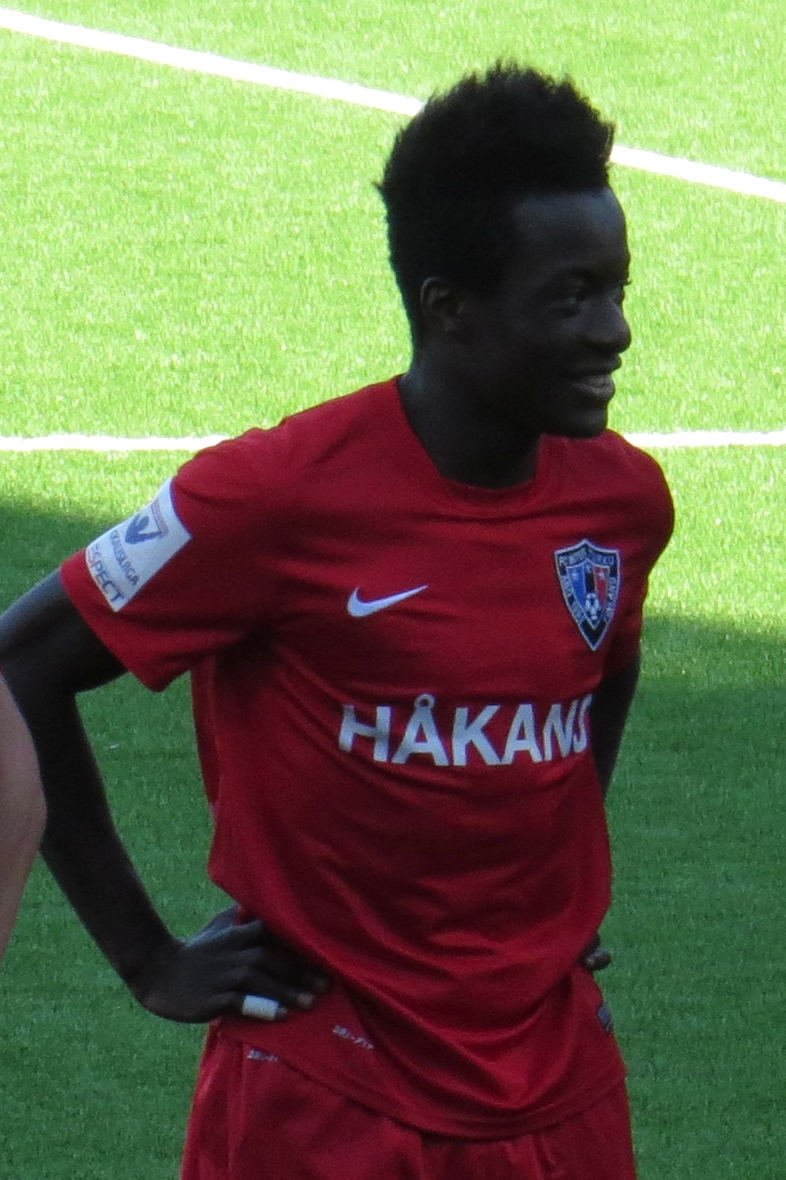

Personal information
- Date of birth: 7 January 1993 (age 33)
- Place of birth: Kitee, Finland
- Height: 1.73 m (5 ft 8 in)
- Position: Midfielder

Team information
- Current team: Peimari United
- Number: 21

Youth career
- HJS
- Inter Turku

Senior career*
Years	Team	Apps	(Gls)
2010–2017	Inter Turku	123	(16)
2011	→ TuTo (loan)	9	(1)
2017	KuPS	15	(0)
2018	Levanger	8	(2)
2019	TPS	22	(1)
2020–2021	Mauerwerk	16	(0)
2023–	Peimari United	34	(8)

International career
2011	Finland U18	2	(0)
2011	Finland U19	6	(0)
2012	Finland U20	4	(0)
2012	Finland U21	2	(0)
- * Club domestic league appearances and goals as of 1 September 2024

Solomon Duah (born 7 January 1993) is a Finnish football player, who currently plays for Peimari United.

He also holds Ghanaian citizenship.

== Career statistics ==
As of 1 September 2024.

Appearances and goals by club, season and competition
Club	Season	League			Cup (Note: Includes Suomen Cup)		League cup		Europe		Total	
Club	Season	Division	Apps	Goals	Apps	Goals	Apps	Goals	Apps	Goals	Apps	Goals
Inter Turku	2010	Veikkausliiga	1	0	0	0	–		–		1	0
Inter Turku	2011	Veikkausliiga	1	0	0	0	–		–		1	0
Inter Turku	2012	Veikkausliiga	15	1	1	0	3	0	1 (Note: Appearance(s) in UEFA Europa League)	0	20	1
Inter Turku	2013	Veikkausliiga	24	1	2	2	5	0	1	0	32	3
Inter Turku	2014	Veikkausliiga	23	5	2	0	4	1	–		29	6
Inter Turku	2015	Veikkausliiga	27	5	4	1	5	0	–		36	6
Inter Turku	2016	Veikkausliiga	33	4	3	2	5	1	–		41	7
Inter Turku	Total		124	16	12	5	22	2	2	0	160	23
TuTo (loan)	2011	Kakkonen	9	1	–		–		–		9	1
KuPS	2017	Veikkausliiga	15	0	6	4	–		–		21	4
Levanger	2018	1. divisjon	8	2	3	1	–		–		11	3
Levanger 2	2018	3. divisjon	18	3	–		–		–		18	3
TPS	2019	Ykkönen	24	2	0	0	–		–		24	2
Inter Turku II	2020	Kolmonen	2	0	–		–		–		2	0
Mauerwerk	2020–21	Austrian Regionalliga East	8	0	–		–		–		8	0
Mauerwerk	2021–22	Austrian Regionalliga East	8	0	–		–		–		8	0
Mauerwerk	Total		16	0	0	0	0	0	0	0	16	0
Peimari United	2023	Kolmonen	21	5	–		–		–		21	5
Peimari United	2024	Kolmonen	13	3	–		–		–		13	3
Peimari United	Total		34	8	0	0	0	0	0	0	34	8
Career total			252	34	21	10	22	2	2	0	297	46
