= Taavi =

Male given name

- Pronunciation: /ˈtɑːvi/
- Gender: Male
- Language: Estonian
- Name day: 30 December (Estonia)

Origin
- Region of origin: Estonia, Finland

Other names
- Related names: Taavet, David

Taavi is an Estonian and Finnish masculine given name, a version of David.

People named Taavi include:

- Taavi Aas (born 1966), Estonian politician, Mayor of Tallinn since 2017
- Taavi Eelmaa (born 1971), Estonian actor
- Taavi (Dave) Komonen (1898–1978), Finnish-Canadian long-distance runner
- Taavi Kotka (born 1979), Estonian businessman
- Taavi Peetre (1983–2010), Estonian shot putter
- Taavi Pöyhönen (1882–1961), Finnish politician
- Taavi Rähn (born 1981), Estonian football player
- Taavi Rand (born 1992), Estonian ice dancer
- Taavi Rõivas (born 1979), former Prime Minister of Estonia
- Taavi Aulis Rytkönen (1929–2014), Finnish football player
- Taavi Tainio (1874–1929), Finnish journalist and politician
- Taavi Tamminen (1889–1967), Finnish wrestler
- Taavi Teplenkov (born 1975), Estonian actor
- Taavi Toom (born 1970), Estonian diplomat
- Taavi Varm (born 1979), Estonian artist
- Taavi Vartia (born 1965), Finnish film director
- Taavi Vartiainen (born 1994), Finnish ice hockey player
- Taavi Veskimägi (born 1974), Estonian politician
