= Joni Mäkelä =

Finnish footballer (born 1993)

Personal information
- Full name: Joni Onni Kristian Mäkelä
- Date of birth: 28 September 1993 (age 33)
- Place of birth: Valkeakoski, Finland
- Height: 1.75 m (5 ft 9 in)
- Position: Right winger

Team information
- Current team: KTP
- Number: 7

Youth career
- OLS

Senior career*
Years	Team	Apps	(Gls)
2009–2013	AC Oulu	51	(9)
2011	→ FC Santa Claus (loan)	10	(1)
2014	KTP	27	(8)
2015–2016	Haka	51	(11)
2017–2018	KuPS	32	(5)
2017–2018	KuFu-98	8	(10)
2019	KPV	21	(3)
2020–2022	Florø	38	(5)
2022–	KTP	120	(15)
- * Club domestic league appearances and goals as of 1 November 2026

Joni Mäkelä (born 28 September 1993) is a Finnish professional footballer who plays for KTP as a right winger.

== Career ==
Mäkelä played in the youth sector of OLS and started his senior career with another local club AC Oulu in 2009.

On 24 December 2018, Kokkolan PV announced the signing of Mäkelä on a one-year deal.

After a stint in Norway with Florø, he has played for KTP since 2022.

== Career statistics ==
As of 10 March 2025

Appearances and goals by club, season and competition
Club	Season	League			Cup (Note: Includes Suomen Cup and Norwegian Football Cup)		League cup (Note: Includes Finnish League Cup, Ykköscup and Ykkösliigacup)		Europe		Total	
Club	Season	Division	Apps	Goals	Apps	Goals	Apps	Goals	Apps	Goals	Apps	Goals
AC Oulu	2009	Ykkönen	1	0	–		–		–		1	0
AC Oulu	2010	Veikkausliiga	10	0	–		2	1	–		12	1
AC Oulu	2011	Ykkönen	3	0	–		–		–		3	0
AC Oulu	2012	Ykkönen	21	5	2	2	–		–		23	7
AC Oulu	2013	Ykkönen	16	4	1	0	–		–		17	4
AC Oulu	Total		51	9	3	2	2	1	0	0	56	12
FC Santa Claus (loan)	2011	Kakkonen	10	1	–		–		–		10	1
KTP	2014	Ykkönen	27	8	0	0	–		–		27	8
Haka	2015	Ykkönen	26	6	5	3	–		–		31	9
Haka	2016	Ykkönen	25	5	5	2	–		–		30	7
Haka	Total		51	11	10	5	0	0	0	0	61	16
KuPS	2017	Veikkausliiga	17	4	5	1	–		–		22	5
KuPS	2018	Veikkausliiga	15	1	4	0	–		2 (Note: Appearances in UEFA Europa League)	0	21	1
KuPS	Total		32	5	9	1	0	0	2	0	43	6
KuFu-98	2017	Kakkonen	2	4	–		–		–		2	4
KuFu-98	2018	Kakkonen	6	6	–		–		–		6	6
KuFu-98	Total		8	10	0	0	0	0	0	0	8	10
KPV	2019	Veikkausliiga	23	3	7	3	–		–		30	6
Florø	2020	2. divisjon	13	3	0	0	–		–		13	3
Florø	2021	2. divisjon	25	2	2	0	–		–		27	2
Florø	Total		38	5	2	0	0	0	0	0	40	5
KTP	2022	Ykkönen	24	7	2	1	4	1	–		30	9
KTP	2023	Veikkausliiga	26	0	3	0	5	1	–		34	1
KTP	2024	Ykkösliiga	25	6	1	0	4	1	–		30	7
KTP	2025	Veikkausliiga	0	0	0	0	4	0	–		4	0
KTP	Total		75	13	6	1	17	3	0	0	98	17
Career total			315	63	37	12	19	4	2	0	373	79

== Honours ==
AC Oulu

- Ykkönen: 2009

KuPS

- Veikkausliiga runner-up: 2017

KTP

- Ykkönen: 2022
- Ykkösliiga: 2024
