= Sasha Popovitch =

Finnish footballer (born 1993)

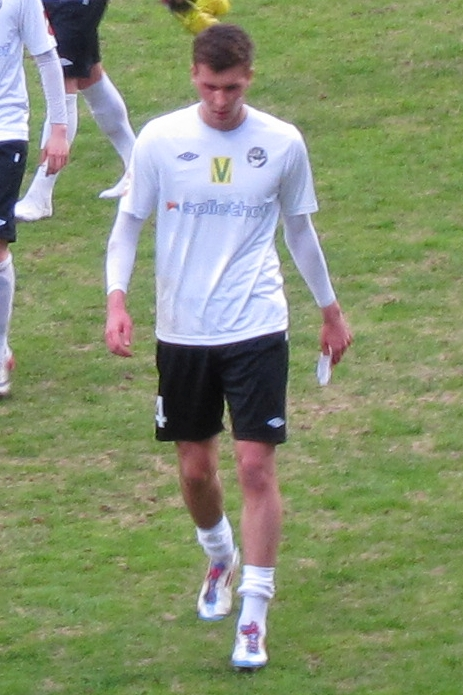

Personal information
- Date of birth: 8 May 1993 (age 33)
- Place of birth: Tampere, Finland
- Height: 1.94 m (6 ft 4 1/2 in)
- Position: Midfielder

Team information
- Current team: Tampere United

Youth career
- Haka

Senior career*
Years	Team	Apps	(Gls)
2011	Ilves-Kissat	1	(0)
2011–2013	FC Haka	36	(2)
2013	Pallo-Iirot	2	(0)
2014–2015	Mikkelin Palloilijat	50	(6)
2016–	Tampere United		
Total		89	(8)

International career
2011	Finland U-18	2	(0)
- * Club domestic league appearances and goals as of 3 October 2015

Sasha Popovitch (born 8 May 1993) is a Finnish football player currently playing for Finnish Kolmonen side Tampere United.

His father is Russian former football player Valeri Popovitch, and his brother Anton Popovitch plays professionally for Veikkausliiga club Ilves.
