= Petteri Forsell =

Finnish footballer (born 1990)

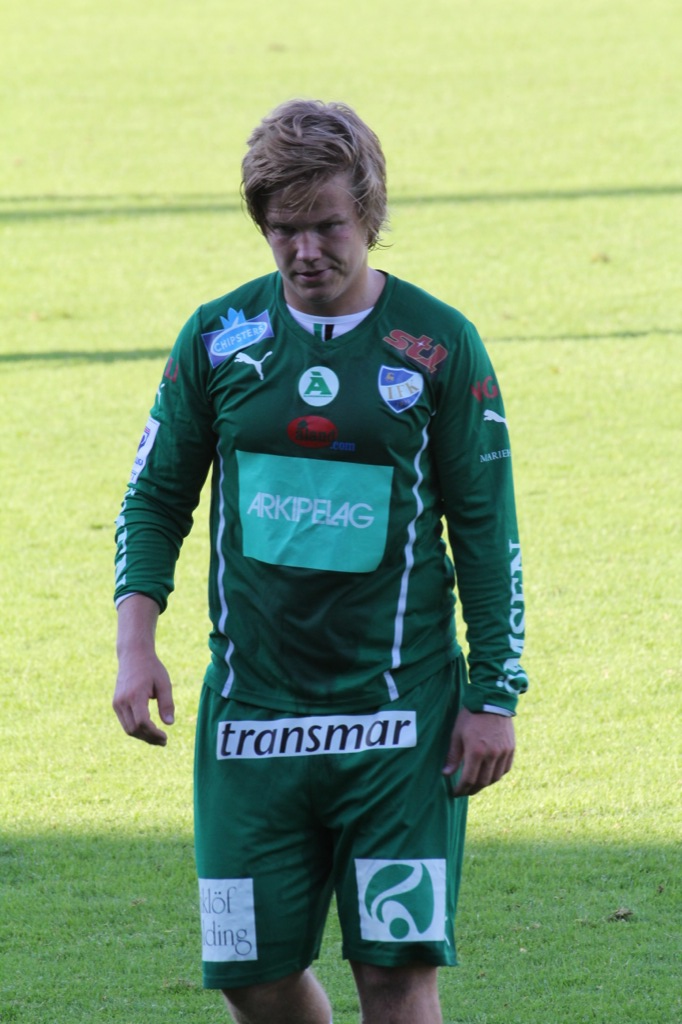
- Forsell in 2013

Personal information
- Full name: Jani Petteri Forsell
- Date of birth: 16 October 1990 (age 36)
- Place of birth: Kokkola, Finland
- Height: 1.69 m (5 ft 7 in)
- Position: Attacking midfielder

Team information
- Current team: KTP
- Number: 10

Youth career
- KPV

Senior career*
| Years | Team | Apps | (Gls) |
| 2007–2008 | KPV | 23 | (2) |
| 2009 | VPS | 12 | (1) |
| 2010–2012 | IFK Mariehamn | 52 | (18) |
| 2012–2013 | Bursaspor | 2 | (0) |
| 2013 | → IFK Mariehamn (loan) | 8 | (4) |
| 2014–2015 | IFK Mariehamn | 48 | (14) |
| 2016–2017 | Miedź Legnica | 44 | (17) |
| 2017 | Örebro | 8 | (0) |
| 2018–2019 | Miedź Legnica | 51 | (14) |
| 2019 | → HJK (loan) | 11 | (2) |
| 2020 | Korona Kielce | 14 | (4) |
| 2020–2021 | Stal Mielec | 26 | (1) |
| 2021–2023 | Inter Turku | 64 | (13) |
| 2024 | Korona Kielce | 4 | (0) |
| 2024 | Şanlıurfaspor | 13 | (1) |
| 2025– | KTP | 53 | (14) |

International career
| 2011–2012 | Finland U21 | 6 | (1) |
| 2013–2019 | Finland | 12 | (1) |
- * Club domestic league appearances and goals as of 1 November 2026

Jani Petteri Forsell (born 16 October 1990) is a Finnish professional footballer who plays as an attacking midfielder for Ykkösliiga club KTP. He made twelve appearances scoring one goal for the Finland national team between 2013 and 2019.

== Career ==
After starting his career with the local KPV, Forsell was signed by a near Veikkausliiga side VPS in 2009. After struggling to make it in the match squads at Vaasa, he left after only one season, switching to a fellow Veikkausliiga side, IFK Mariehamn. At Mariehamn, he began appear more regularly and soon attracted the attention of much bigger clubs in and outside of Finland. On 9 August 2012, he was selected as the player of the month, for July.

On 5 August 2012, it was announced that Forsell had signed with Süper Lig club Bursaspor for a transfer fee of €500,000. He was handed the number #7 shirt for the upcoming season. Forsell made his debut for Bursaspor as a substitute on 23 August in a Europa League qualifying match against FC Twente.

Forsell was selected as the Ekstraklasa Player of the Month for September 2018. Forsell was the first ever player from Miedź Legnica to win the award and the first player to win it in his rookie year.

On 10 August 2019, Forsell scored one and gave two assists in a 4–0 win against FC Lahti on his league debut for HJK as a loan player.

After stints with Korona Kielce and Stal Mielec, Forsell returned to Finland and signed with Inter Turku for the 2021 season. On 21 February 2022, Forsell extended his deal with Inter.

After leaving Inter at the end of 2023, Forsell remained a free agent until 30 March 2024 before rejoining Ekstraklasa club Korona Kielce, whom he previously represented in 2020. He made his return to Polish football two days later as a second-half substitute in a 3–1 away loss to Widzew Łódź. He left the club at the end of June.

On 9 July 2024, Forsell signed with Turkish TFF 1. Lig club Şanlıurfaspor. He terminated his contract in January due to unpaid salaries.

On 18 February 2025, Forsell signed a three-year deal with newly promoted Veikkausliiga club KTP.

== International career ==
A former youth international, Forsell debuted with the Finland senior national team on 6 February 2013 against Israel, scoring a goal in his first appearance.

== Career statistics ==
=== Club ===
As of 9 March 2025

Appearances and goals by club, season and competition
| Club | Season | League | | | Cup (Note: Includes Suomen Cup, Turkish Cup, Polish Cup and Svenska Cupen) | | League cup | | Europe | | Total | |
| Club | Season | Division | Apps | Goals | Apps | Goals | Apps | Goals | Apps | Goals | Apps | Goals |
|---|---|---|---|---|---|---|---|---|---|---|---|---|
| KPV | 2007 | Ykkönen | 9 | 2 | — | | — | | — | | 9 | 2 |
| KPV | 2008 | Ykkönen | 14 | 0 | — | | — | | — | | 14 | 0 |
| KPV | Total | | 23 | 2 | 0 | 0 | 0 | 0 | 0 | 0 | 23 | 2 |
| VPS | 2009 | Veikkausliiga | 12 | 1 | 0 | 0 | 7 | 1 | — | | 19 | 2 |
| IFK Mariehamn | 2010 | Veikkausliiga | 12 | 3 | 3 | 0 | 0 | 0 | — | | 15 | 3 |
| IFK Mariehamn | 2011 | Veikkausliiga | 22 | 6 | 2 | 1 | 0 | 0 | — | | 24 | 7 |
| IFK Mariehamn | 2012 | Veikkausliiga | 18 | 9 | 4 | 5 | 1 | 0 | — | | 23 | 14 |
| IFK Mariehamn | Total | | 52 | 18 | 9 | 6 | 1 | 0 | 0 | 0 | 62 | 24 |
| Bursaspor | 2012–13 | Süper Lig | 2 | 0 | 7 | 1 | — | | 1 (Note: Appearance(s) in UEFA Europa League) | 0 | 10 | 1 |
| IFK Mariehamn (loan) | 2013 | Veikkausliiga | 8 | 4 | 3 | 5 | 1 | 0 | — | | 12 | 9 |
| IFK Mariehamn | 2014 | Veikkausliiga | 31 | 11 | 3 | 1 | 3 | 0 | — | | 37 | 12 |
| IFK Mariehamn | 2015 | Veikkausliiga | 17 | 3 | 4 | 4 | 4 | 0 | — | | 25 | 7 |
| IFK Mariehamn | Total | | 48 | 14 | 7 | 5 | 7 | 0 | 0 | 0 | 62 | 19 |
| Miedź Legnica | 2015–16 | I liga | 14 | 4 | — | | — | | — | | 14 | 4 |
| Miedź Legnica | 2016–17 | I liga | 30 | 13 | 2 | 2 | — | | — | | 32 | 15 |
| Miedź Legnica | Total | | 44 | 17 | 2 | 2 | 0 | 0 | 0 | 0 | 46 | 19 |
| Örebro | 2017 | Allsvenskan | 8 | 0 | 1 | 0 | — | | — | | 9 | 0 |
| Miedź Legnica | 2017–18 | I liga | 12 | 1 | — | | — | | — | | 12 | 1 |
| Miedź Legnica | 2018–19 | Ekstraklasa | 37 | 13 | 5 | 3 | — | | — | | 42 | 16 |
| Miedź Legnica | 2019–20 | I liga | 2 | 0 | 0 | 0 | — | | — | | 2 | 0 |
| Miedź Legnica | Total | | 51 | 14 | 5 | 3 | 0 | 0 | 0 | 0 | 56 | 17 |
| Miedź Legnica II | 2018–19 | III liga | 1 | 0 | — | | — | | — | | 1 | 0 |
| HJK (loan) | 2019 | Veikkausliiga | 11 | 2 | 0 | 0 | — | | 2 | 1 | 13 | 3 |
| Korona Kielce | 2019–20 | Ekstraklasa | 14 | 4 | — | | — | | — | | 14 | 4 |
| Stal Mielec | 2020–21 | Ekstraklasa | 26 | 1 | 2 | 0 | — | | — | | 28 | 1 |
| Inter Turku | 2021 | Veikkausliiga | 11 | 3 | — | | — | | — | | 11 | 3 |
| Inter Turku | 2022 | Veikkausliiga | 27 | 6 | 5 | 0 | 3 | 0 | 2 (Note: Appearances in UEFA Europa Conference League) | 0 | 37 | 6 |
| Inter Turku | 2023 | Veikkausliiga | 26 | 4 | 2 | 0 | 5 | 0 | — | | 33 | 4 |
| Inter Turku | Total | | 64 | 13 | 7 | 0 | 8 | 0 | 2 | 0 | 81 | 13 |
| Korona Kielce | 2023–24 | Ekstraklasa | 4 | 0 | — | | — | | — | | 4 | 0 |
| Şanlıurfaspor | 2024–25 | TFF 1. Lig | 13 | 1 | 0 | 0 | — | | — | | 13 | 1 |
| KTP | 2025 | Veikkausliiga | 0 | 0 | 0 | 0 | 2 | 0 | – | | 2 | 0 |
| Career total | | | 381 | 91 | 43 | 22 | 25 | 1 | 5 | 1 | 454 | 115 |

=== International ===
As of match played 8 June 2019

Finland
| Year | Apps | Goals |
|---|---|---|
| 2013 | 1 | 1 |
| 2014 | 1 | 0 |
| 2015 | 2 | 0 |
| 2016 | 2 | 0 |
| 2017 | 3 | 0 |
| 2018 | 2 | 0 |
| 2019 | 1 | 0 |
| Total | 12 | 1 |

=== International goals ===
Scores and results list Finland's goal tally first, score column indicates score after each Forsell goal.

List of international goals scored by Petteri Forsell
| No. | Date | Venue | Opponent | Score | Result | Competition |
|---|---|---|---|---|---|---|
| 1 | 6 February 2013 | Netanya Stadium, Netanya, Israel | Israel | 1–1 | 1–2 | Friendly |

== Honours ==
IFK Mariehamn

- Finnish Cup: 2015

Miedź Legnica

- I liga: 2017–18

Korona Kielce II

- IV liga Świętokrzyskie: 2023–24

Inter Turku

- Finnish Cup runner-up: 2022
- Finnish League Cup runner-up: 2022

Individual

- Veikkausliiga Player of the Month:July 2012, April 2013, August 2014, September 2021
- Veikkausliiga top assist provider: 2014
- Veikkausliiga Team of the Year: 2021
- Ekstraklasa Player of the Month: September 2018
