= Julius Rantaeskola =

Finnish ice hockey right winger (born 1993)

- Born: March 22, 1993 (age 33) Helsinki, Finland
- Height: 6 ft 2 in (188 cm)
- Weight: 207 lb (94 kg; 14 st 11 lb)
- Position: Right wing
- Shoots: Left
- Liiga team: KalPa
- Playing career: 2014–present

Julius Rantaeskola (born March 22, 1993) is a Finnish professional ice hockey right winger currently playing for KalPa of Liiga.

== Career ==
Rantaeskola had spells on Jr. A SM-liiga for HIFK and Jokerit before making his professional debut with a loan spell at Kiekko-Vantaa of Mestis during the 2013-14 season. He became a permanent member of Kiekko-Vantaa on June 4, 2014, and played the next four seasons with the team. He had rejoined Jokerit on May 2, 2017, on a two-way contract after they entered co-operation with Kiekko-Vantaa but spent the 2017–18 season on loan at Vantaa for his fourth successive season with them.

On May 18, 2018, Rantaeskola joined IPK of Mestis where he led the team with 40 points (18 goals and 22 assists) in 50 games. His performances earned him a try-out with IPK's parent club KalPa alongside Tuomas Vartiainen. He made his debut for the team on September 14, 2019, against HIFK. Nine days later, KalPa announced that both Rantaeskola and Vartiainen would remain with the team until the end of the season after a successful try out.
