= Jonas Emet =

Finnish footballer (born 1988)

Personal information
- Date of birth: 13 February 1988 (age 38)
- Place of birth: Jakobstad, Finland
- Height: 1.84 m (6 ft 0 in)
- Position: Midfielder

Team information
- Current team: Jakobstads BK
- Number: 10

Youth career
- 2005–2007: FF Jaro

Senior career*
Years	Team	Apps	(Gls)
2007–2009	FF Jaro	96	(10)
2010–2011	Tampere United	17	(2)
2011	IFK Mariehamn	20	(1)
2012–2019	FF Jaro	161	(36)
2020–	Jakobstads BK	26	(3)

International career
- Finland U-15
- Finland U-17
- Finland U-19
2009	Finland U-21	1	(0)
- * Club domestic league appearances and goals as of 1 October 2022

Jonas Emet (born 13 February 1988) is a Finnish footballer who plays as a midfielder for Jakobstads BK.

== Career ==
Throughout his career, Emet has represented FF Jaro, Tampere United, and IFK Mariehamn. He made his debut at the senior level in 2005.

== International career ==
Emet was a member of Finland U-15, Finland U-17, Finland U-19 and Finland national under-21 football team.

== Personal life ==
He was born in Jakobstad.

== Honours ==
Individual

- Veikkausliiga Top Score: 2014
