= Diego Assis (footballer, born 1987) =

Brazilian footballer

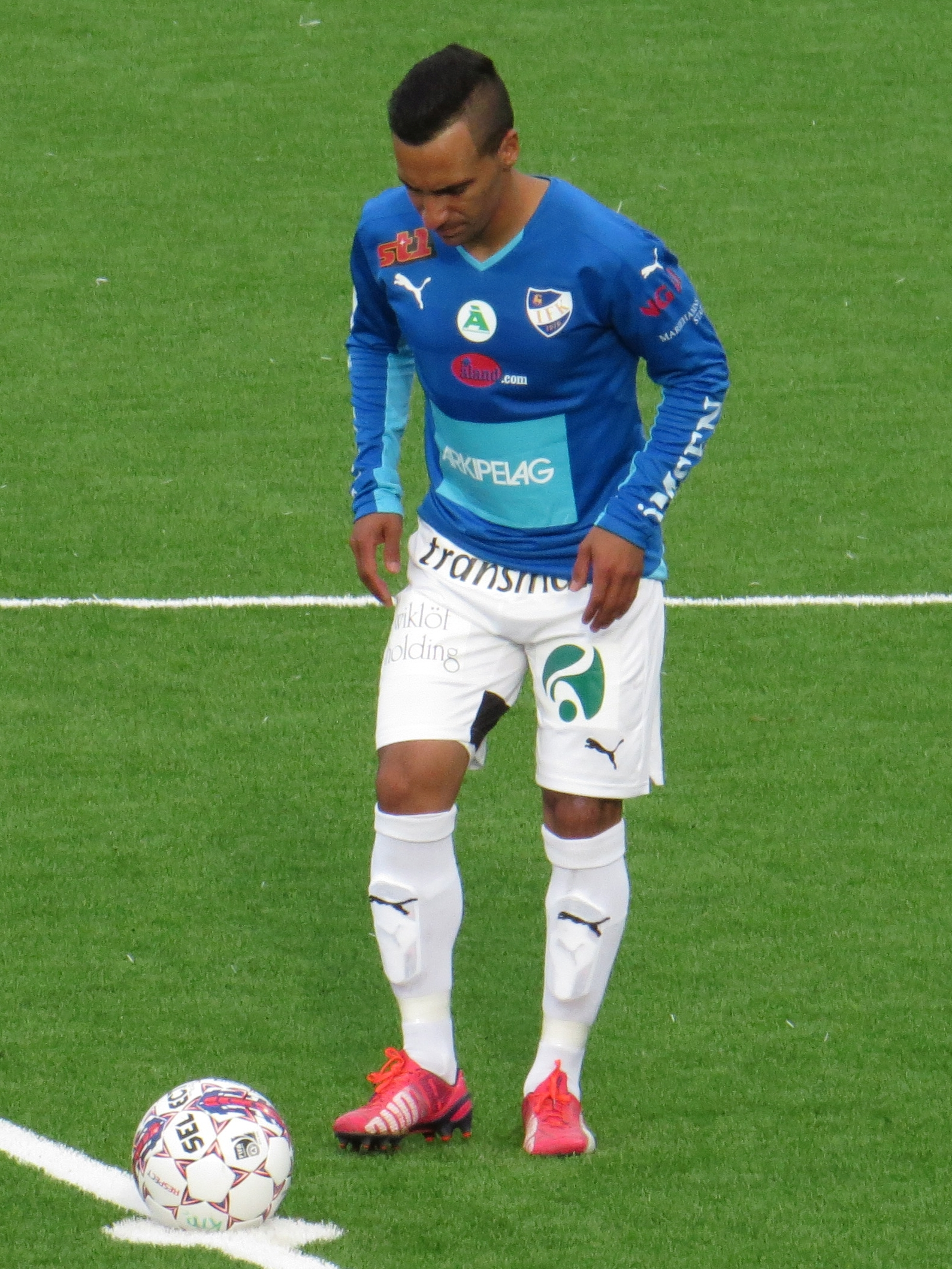
- Assis playing for Mariehamn in 2015

Personal information
- Full name: Diego Assis Figueiredo
- Date of birth: 14 September 1987 (age 39)
- Place of birth: Minas Gerais, Brazil
- Height: 1.66 m (5 ft 5 in)
- Position: Attacking midfielder

Senior career*
Years	Team	Apps	(Gls)
2010–2012	Assi IF	48	(25)
2013–2016	IFK Mariehamn	100	(24)
2017	Thai Honda	11	(0)
2018–2019	Persela Lamongan	28	(6)
2019	Al-Ain		
2019	Madura United	16	(2)
2021	Bali United	0	(0)
- * Club domestic league appearances and goals as of 22 December 2019

Diego Assis Figueiredo (born 14 September 1987) is a Brazilian professional footballer who plays as an attacking midfielder.

== Club career ==
=== Assi IF ===
Before playing football, Assis worked as a mechanic around the same time as playing amateur football. Assis had a big moment when he moved to Sweden in July 2010 to join Assi after being scouted in Europe, playing in the tournament.

After signing a contract in 2011, Assis then helped the club get promoted to Norra Norrland. During his two-year spell at Assi, he scored 25 goals in 48 appearances.

=== IFK Mariehamn ===
On 23 October 2012, it was announced that Assis would join Finnish side Mariehamn on a free transfer for next season. Assis had interests from Swedish clubs before moving to Mariehamn.

Despite losing all of the six matches in the group stage of the Finnish League Cup, Assis scored once in the group stage, in a 4-3 loss against Honka. Asis then scored his first goal for the club and set up one of the goals on his debut, in the opening game of the season, in a 3-1 win over RoPS on 14 April 2013. Assis then scored three more goals later in the season against Lahti, Turun Palloseura and MYPA. However, Assis finished the first season, making twenty-four appearances and scoring five times in all competitions after suffering a knee injury during a Europa League match against Inter Baku that ended his season.

After recovering from a knee injury ahead of the new season, Assis then made his return to the first team on 23 April 2014, in a 1-0 win over Turun Palloseura. Following this, Assis started sign of improvement when he scored his first goal of the season, in a 2-2 draw against Honka on 23 May 2014 and his second goal of the season then came on 11 June 2014, in a 3-1 loss against TPS. After scoring against Inter Turku and Vaasan Palloseura, Assis scored a hat-trick on 10 August 2014, in a 4-1 win over Honka. After scoring in a 3-1 win over ROPS on 24 August 2014, Assis signed a two-year contract with the club, keeping him until 2016, three days later. Assis later scored four more goals in the season against Kuopion Palloseura and TPS (twice). Assis went on to finish the 2014, making twenty-four appearances and scoring eleven times in all competitions.

In the 2015 season, Assis started the season when he scored in the fourth round of the Finnish League Cup, in a 12-0 win over Tampere United and then scored his first league goal against VPS. Assis then scored twice on 17 May 2015, in a 2-0 win over FC Ilves. In the semi final of Finnish League Cup, Assis scored in a 5-1 win over HJK and in the final of the Finnish Cup, he scored a brace, in a 2-1 win over FC Inter. Assis finished the 2015 season, making thirty-eight appearances and scoring seven times in all competitions.

In the 2016 season, Assis started the season well when he scored four goals in fifteen appearances against Palloseura Kemi Kings, HIFK Fotboll, VPS and SJK. Assis then ended his fourteen league matches without scoring, in a 1-1 draw against ROPS on 14 October 2016. In the last game of the season, Assis came on as a substitute in the second half and scored the winning goal, in a 2-1 win over Ilves to secure the first ever Veikkausliiga Championship for the island club. Following the club's title win, Assis went on to make thirty-nine appearances and scored six times in all competitions.

=== Thai Honda ===
On 20 December 2016, Assis signed for Thai League T1 side Thai Honda.

=== Al-Ain ===
After leaving Persela, Assis signed for Saudi second-tier club Al-Ain in January 2019.

== Career statistics ==
As of match played 11 February 2017

Club	Season	League			National Cup		League Cup		Continental		Total	
Club	Season	Division	Apps	Goals	Apps	Goals	Apps	Goals	Apps	Goals	Apps	Goals
Assi IF	2010	Division 3 Norra Norrland	8	6			-		-		8	6
Assi IF	2011	Division 3 Norra Norrland	20	13			-		-		28	12
Assi IF	2012	Division 2 Norrland	20	6			-		-		20	6
Assi IF	Total		48	25			-	-	-	-	48	25
IFK Mariehamn	2013	Veikkausliiga	15	4	2	0	6	1	1	0	24	5
IFK Mariehamn	2014	Veikkausliiga	25	11	1	0	2	1	-		28	12
IFK Mariehamn	2015	Veikkausliiga	28	3	3	3	4	0	-		25	6
IFK Mariehamn	2016	Veikkausliiga	32	6	2	0	5	0	2	0	41	6
IFK Mariehamn	Total		100	24	8	3	15	2	3	0	118	29
Thai Honda	2017	Thai League T1	1	0	0	0	-		-		1	0
Career total			149	49	8	3	15	2	3	0	167	54

== Personal life ==
Assis is married and together, they have a son. In addition to speaking Portuguese, Assis also speaks English and Swedish since moving to Europe in 2010.

== Honours ==
=== Club ===
IFK Mariehamn

- Veikkausliiga (1): 2016
- Finnish Cup (1): 2015
