= Tani Stafsula =

Albanian-born Finnish footballer (born 1981)

Personal information
- Full name: Dritan Stafsula
- Date of birth: 16 July 1981 (age 45)
- Place of birth: Tirana, Albania
- Height: 1.75 m (5 ft 9 in)
- Position: Winger

Senior career*
Years	Team	Apps	(Gls)
1999–2002	Tervarit	60	(5)
2003	AC Oulu	25	(7)
2004–2005	Allianssi	39	(2)
2005	→ Tampere United (loan)	4	(0)
2006–2008	Bodø/Glimt	20	(1)
2007	→ AC Oulu (loan)	20	(2)
2008	Zhenis	13	(0)
2009	DAC Dunajská Streda	3	(0)
2009–2011	OPA	15	(5)
2010	→ Bodens (loan)	0	(0)
2011	→ AC Oulu (loan)	21	(12)
2012–2015	AC Oulu	102	(25)
2016–2017	HauPa	24	(22)
2020	OTP	8	(1)
- * Club domestic league appearances and goals as of 31 December 2020

Dritan "Tani" Stafsula (born 16 July 1981) is an Albanian-born Finnish retired footballer, who finished his career at Finnish team Haukiputaan Pallo. He played the majority of his career however for AC Oulu.

== Club career ==
Stafsula started his senior career with Oulu-based club Tervarit in 1999 in Finnish third-tier Kakkonen. The club were promoted and Stafsula played with Tervarit in Ykkönen until 2002, and for the 2003 season he joined newly formatted AC Oulu which inherited Tervarit's league spot in Ykkönen. Next year he moved to Veikkausliiga club AC Allianssi.

In 2006, Stafsula moved to Norway and signed with Bodø/Glimt in Norwegian 1. divisjon. In his first season he made 20 appearances and scored one goal for his club, but he returned to AC Oulu on a loan deal for the 2007 Veikkausliiga season. He would make 20 appearances and scored two goals for ACO in his third season in the Finnish top level.

He terminated his contract with Bodø/Glimt in 2008 and joined Kazakhstan Premier League club Zhenis for the remainder of the season. In 2009, he signed with DAC Dunajská Streda in Slovak First League.

Later in 2009 he returned to Oulu to FC OPA in Kakkonen. Besides a loan stint to Bodens in Sweden in 2010, Stafsula stayed in Oulu, playing five seasons with his former club AC Oulu in Ykkönen and making 122 league appearances and scoring 36 goals. In 2016, he joined Haukiputaan Pallo in fourth-tier Kolmonen. During five seasons with HauPa, Stafsula played 31 matches and scored 26 goals.

In 2020, he played eight matches and scored a goal for OTP in Kolmonen.

Stafsula is considered an AC Oulu club legend. He is the all-time top goal scorer in the club's history, having recorded 54 goals in 184 official appearances.

== Futsal ==
Stafsula also played futsal for Oulun side FC Tervarit.

== Personal life ==
Born in Tirana, Albania, he moved to Finland in the late 1990s. He holds dual citizenship of Albania and Finland.

== Career statistics ==
As of 23 May 2024

Appearances and goals by club, season and competition
Club	Season	League			Cup (Note: Includes Suomen Cup)		Europe		Total	
Club	Season	Division	Apps	Goals	Apps	Goals	Apps	Goals	Apps	Goals
Tervarit	1999	Kakkonen			–		–			
Tervarit	2000	Ykkönen					–			
Tervarit	2001	Ykkönen					–			
Tervarit	2002	Ykkönen					–			
Tervarit	Total		60	5	0	0	–	–	60	5
AC Oulu	2003	Ykkönen	25	7	0	0	–		25	7
Allianssi	2004	Veikkausliiga	23	0	0	0	2 (Note: Includes UEFA Cup)	0	25	0
Allianssi	2005	Veikkausliiga	16	2	0	0	1	0	17	2
Allianssi	Total		39	2	0	0	3	0	42	2
TamU (loan)	2005	Veikkausliiga	4	0	–		–		4	0
Bodø/Glimt	2006	1. divisjon	20	1	0	0	–		20	1
Bodø/Glimt	2007	1. divisjon	0	0	0	0	–		0	0
Bodø/Glimt	2008	Tippeligaen	0	0	0	0	–		0	0
Bodø/Glimt	Total		20	1	0	0	–	–	20	1
AC Oulu (loan)	2007	Veikkausliiga	20	2	0	0	–		20	2
Zhenis Astana	2008	Kazakhstan Premier League	13	0	0	0	–		13	0
DAC 1904	2008–09	Slovak First Football League	3	0	0	0	–		3	0
OPA	2009	Kakkonen	15	5	–		–		15	5
Boden (loan)	2010	Division 1	11	1	–		–		11	1
AC Oulu (loan)	2011	Ykkönen	21	12	–		–		21	12
AC Oulu	2012	Ykkönen	27	8	1	0	–		28	8
AC Oulu	2013	Ykkönen	26	2	1	0	–		27	2
AC Oulu	2014	Ykkönen	26	11	2	1	–		28	12
AC Oulu	2015	Ykkönen	22	3	5	3	–		27	6
AC Oulu	Total		101	24	9	4	–	–	110	28
HauPa	2016	Nelonen	10	10	1	0	–		11	10
HauPa	2017	Kolmonen	14	12	6	4	–		20	16
HauPa	Total		24	22	7	4	–	–	31	26
OTP	2020	Kolmonen	8	1	–		–		8	1
Career total			354	82	16	8	3	0	373	90
