= Adriano Munoz =

Brazilian footballer (born 1978)

Personal information
- Full name: Adriano Afonso Thiel Munoz
- Date of birth: 23 July 1978 (age 48)
- Place of birth: Itapiranga, Brazil
- Height: 1.87 m (6 ft 2 in)
- Position: Striker

Youth career
- Cruzeiro RS

Senior career*
Years	Team	Apps	(Gls)
	Atlantis	26	(7)
1999–2001	AC Allianssi	71	(22)
2002–2005	MyPa	36	(13)
2006–2007	Sandefjord	31	(7)
2008–2009	Tromsø	32	(3)
2009	Örebro	10	(1)
2009	Cruzeiro RS Porto Alegre	20	(9)
2010	PS Kemi	15	(3)
2011	OPS	6	(2)
2012	Lajeadense	8	(0)
2012–2013	TP-47	6	(2)
2013	Ypiranga de Erechim		
2014	Ekenäs IF	7	(4)
2015–2016	PK Keski-Uusimaa	11	(2)
2017–2018	CLE		
2019	TPS II		

Managerial career
- 2020: Atlantis (U19)
- 2020: Atlantis
- * Club domestic league appearances and goals

Adriano Afonso Thiel Munoz (born 23 July 1978) is a Brazilian football coach and a former player who is most noted for his time in the Nordic countries.

Munoz played for Finnish clubs Atlantis, AC Allianssi and MyPa, before he played in Tippeligaen for Sandefjord and Tromsø, and in Allsvenskan for Örebro. He later played for Cruzeiro RS Porto Alegre for and PS Kemi.

== Career statistics ==
As of 18 July 2013

Season	Club	Division	League		Cup		Europe		Total	
Season	Club	Division	Apps	Goals	Apps	Goals	Apps	Goals	Apps	Goals
2006	Sandefjord	Tippeligaen	8	2	2	0	0	0	10	2
2007	Sandefjord	Tippeligaen	23	5	2	0	0	0	25	5
2008	Tromsø	Tippeligaen	22	2	2	1	0	0	24	3
2009	Tromsø	Tippeligaen	10	1	3	1	0	0	13	2
2009	Örebro	Allsvenskan	10	1	0	0	0	0	10	1
2010	PS Kemi	Ykkönen	15	3	0	0	0	0	15	3
2011	OPS	Ykkönen	6	2	0	0	0	0	6	2
2012	Lajeadense	Campeonato Gaúcho	8	0	0	0	0	0	8	0
2012	TP-47	Kakkonen	6	2	0	0	0	0	6	2
Career Total			108	18	9	2	0	0	117	20
