= Adimar Neves =

São Toméan footballer

Personal information
- Full name: Adimar Vila Nova Neves
- Date of birth: 28 May 1990 (age 36)
- Place of birth: Água Grande, São Tomé and Príncipe
- Height: 1.90 m (6 ft 3 in)
- Position: Central defender

Team information
- Current team: Peimari United
- Number: 4

Youth career
- 2002–2007: Vale de Milhaços
- 2008–2009: Cova da Piedade

Senior career*
Years	Team	Apps	(Gls)
2009–2012	Cova da Piedade	32	(1)
2012–2013	Beira Mar Almada	12	(1)
2013–	Peimari United		

International career^{‡}
2016–	São Tomé and Príncipe	1	(0)
- * Club domestic league appearances and goals ‡ National team caps and goals as of 4 June 2016

Adimar Vila Nova Neves (born 28 May 1990), known as Adimar Neves or simply Adimar, is a São Toméan footballer who plays as a central defender for Finnish club Peimari United and the São Tomé and Príncipe national team. He also holds Portuguese citizenship.

== International career ==
Adimar Neves made his international debut on 4 June 2016, when he played entirely in a loss Africa Cup of Nations qualifier against Cape Verde.
