= Juho Pirttijoki =

Finnish footballer (born 1996)

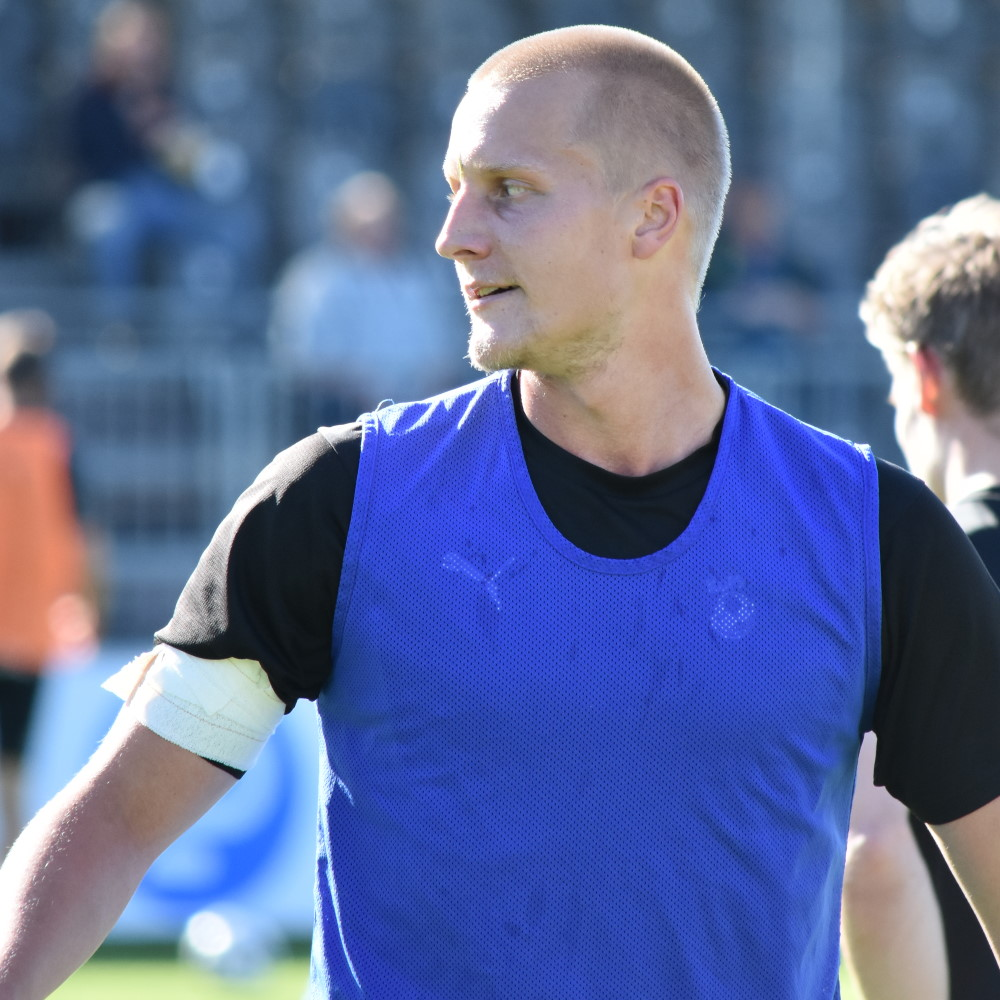
- Pirttijoki with KuPS in 2020.

Personal information
- Full name: Juho Janne Eemeli Pirttijoki
- Date of birth: 30 July 1996 (age 30)
- Place of birth: Toijala, Finland
- Height: 1.95 m (6 ft 5 in)
- Position: Centre back

Senior career*
Years	Team	Apps	(Gls)
2014–2015	Haka	23	(5)
2014	→ Hämeenlinna (loan)	4	(2)
2016–2017	HIFK	25	(1)
2017–2018	GIF Sundsvall	7	(0)
2018	→ KuPS (loan)	10	(0)
2019–2021	KuPS	31	(1)
2022–2023	Lahti	30	(3)
Total		131	(12)

International career
2014–2015	Finland U19	7	(0)
2016–2018	Finland U21	11	(0)
2018	Finland	1	(0)
- * Club domestic league appearances and goals

Juho Janne Eemeli Pirttijoki (born 30 July 1996) is a Finnish former professional footballer who played as a centre back.

== Club career ==
Pirttijoki has played for Haka, Hämeenlinna, HIFK, GIF Sundsvall and KuPS. While playing for KuPS, Pirttijoki won the Finnish championship title in 2019, and the Finnish Cup title in 2021.

On 9 February 2022, Pirttijoki signed a contract with Lahti for the 2022 season, with an option for 2023.

In January 2024, Pirttijoki announced his retirement from professional football due to consecutive injuries.

Later he has played futsal for Toijalan Pallo-49.

== International career ==
He made his debut for Finland national football team on 11 January 2018 in a friendly against Jordan.

== Career statistics ==
As of 1 September 2024.

Appearances and goals by club, season and competition
Club	Season	League			Cup (Note: Includes Suomen Cup and Svenska Cupen)		League cup (Note: Includes Finnish League Cup)		Europe		Total	
Club	Season	Division	Apps	Goals	Apps	Goals	Apps	Goals	Apps	Goals	Apps	Goals
Hämeenlinna (loan)	2014	Kakkonen	4	2	–		–		–		4	2
Haka	2015	Ykkönen	23	5	3	0	–		–		26	5
HIFK	2016	Veikkausliiga	25	1	1	0	–		–		26	1
HIFK	2017	Veikkausliiga	0	0	1	1	–		–		1	1
HIFK	Total		25	1	2	1	0	0	0	0	27	2
GIF Sundsvall	2017	Allsvenskan	4	0	0	0	–		–		4	0
GIF Sundsvall	2018	Allsvenskan	3	0	3	0	–		–		6	0
GIF Sundsvall	Total		7	0	3	0	0	0	0	0	10	0
KuPS (loan)	2018	Veikkausliiga	10	0	0	0	–		2 (Note: Appearances in UEFA Europa League)	0	12	0
KuPS	2019	Veikkausliiga	11	0	3	0	–		0	0	14	0
KuPS	2020	Veikkausliiga	14	1	5	0	–		2 (Note: Appearances in UEFA Champions League and UEFA Europa League)	0	21	1
KuPS	2021	Veikkausliiga	6	0	2	0	–		0	0	8	0
KuPS	Total		31	1	10	0	0	0	4	0	45	1
Lahti	2022	Veikkausliiga	19	1	3	0	3	0	–		25	1
Lahti	2023	Veikkausliiga	13	2	0	0	3	1	–		16	3
Lahti	Total		32	3	3	0	6	1	0	0	41	4
Career total			132	12	21	1	6	1	4	0	163	14

== Honours ==
KuPS

- Veikkausliiga: 2019
- Veikkausliiga runner-up: 2021
- Finnish Cup: 2021
