= Alessandro Marzuoli =

Italian footballer (born 1984)

Personal information
- Date of birth: 26 February 1984 (age 42)
- Place of birth: Italy
- Position: Goalkeeper

Senior career*
Years	Team	Apps	(Gls)
-2003/04	Delfino Pescara 1936	0	(0)
2003/2004	Renato Curi Angolana		
2004/2005	S.S.D. Casarano Calcio		
2005/2006	F.C. Francavilla		
2007	TOP Oss	0	(0)
2007/2008	Vastese Calcio 1902		
- FC Marek Dupnitsa
2010	Vaasan Palloseura	5	(0)
2013-2014	FC Futura	48	(0)
2015	AC Oulu	17	(0)
2017-2018	IF Gnistan	12	(0)
- * Club domestic league appearances and goals

Alessandro Marzuoli (born 26 February 1984) is an Italian retired footballer.

== Career ==
While playing for AC Oulu in 2015, Marzuoli scored a goal in injury time to make it 3-3 against PS Kemi Kings in the Finnish Super Cup, helping them advance to the quarter-finals.
