= Saša Jovović =

Montenegrin footballer (born 1986)

Personal information
- Date of birth: 6 September 1986 (age 40)
- Place of birth: Čačak, SFR Yugoslavia
- Height: 1.83 m (6 ft 0 in)
- Position: Centre forward

Youth career
- Borac Čačak

Senior career*
Years	Team	Apps	(Gls)
2005–2007	Sloboda Čačak	45	(21)
2007	Tekstilac	13	(6)
2008	Jedinstvo	10	(8)
2008–2009	Jezero	27	(6)
2009–2010	Rudar Pljevlja	6	(0)
2010–2012	OFK Grbalj	12	(1)
2011	→ Mornar (loan)	13	(5)
2013	Mornar	1	(0)
2013	OPS	10	(4)
2014	OFK Petrovac	8	(2)
2014–2016	PS Kemi	28	(16)
2016	EIF	15	(10)
2016	KuPS	11	(1)
2017	AC Oulu	13	(8)
2017	JJK	14	(3)
2018	Jaro	12	(3)
2018–2019	Zvijezda 09	9	(3)
2019–2020	Kemi City	15	(9)
2021	Borac Čačak	7	(0)
- * Club domestic league appearances and goals

Saša Jovović (born 6 September 1986) is a Montenegrin professional football player who plays as a centre forward.

== Club career ==
Jovović started football in the youth sector of his hometown club Borac Čačak. He played his first senior years for Sloboda Čačak in 2005–2007, before continuing his career in Montenegrin First League with Tekstilac, Jedinstvo, Jezero, FK Rudar Pljevlja, OFK Grbalj and Mornar. With Rudar, they won the Montenegrin championship title and the Montenegrin Cup in the 2009–10 season.

In August 2013, Jovović moved to Finland for the first time and signed with OPS in the second-tier Ykkönen. After the season he returned to Montenegro and signed with OFK Petrovac. In July 2014, he moved back to Finland to join PS Kemi in third-tier Kakkonen. They won two consecutive promotions, and in the 2016 season, Jovović debuted in top-tier Veikkausliiga with Kemi. Later he has played for Finnish clubs Ekenäs IF, KuPS, AC Oulu, JJK Jyväskylä, and Jaro.

During 2018–2019, he played briefly for Zvijezda 09 in the Bosnian Premier League.

== Honours ==
Rudar Pljevlja

- Montenegrin First League: 2009–10
- Montenegrin Cup: 2009–10

PS Kemi

- Ykkönen: 2015
