= Tuomas Vartiainen =

Finnish ice hockey right winger

- Born: May 8, 1996 (age 30) Oulu, Finland
- Height: 5 ft 10 in (178 cm)
- Weight: 161 lb (73 kg; 11 st 7 lb)
- Position: Right wing
- Shoots: Right
- Liiga team (P) Cur. team Former teams: KalPa; IPK (Mestis); Kärpät; Jukurit
- Playing career: 2016–present

Tuomas Vartiainen (born May 8, 1996) is a Finnish professional ice hockey right winger currently playing for IPK on loan from KalPa.

Vartiainen previously played for Kärpät, making his debut for the team on September 29, 2016, against HPK. He went on to play 11 games during the 2016–17 Liiga season and 12 games during the 2017–18 Liiga season. He also played seven games on loan at Jukurit during the 2017–18 season.

Vartiainen joined IPK of Mestis on May 11, 2018. On April 12, 2019, he received a try-out with IPK's parent club KalPa alongside Julius Rantaeskola. On September 23, 2019, the team announced that both Vartiainen and Rantaeskola would remain until the end of the season.
