= Samuli Kaivonurmi =

Finnish footballer (born 1988)

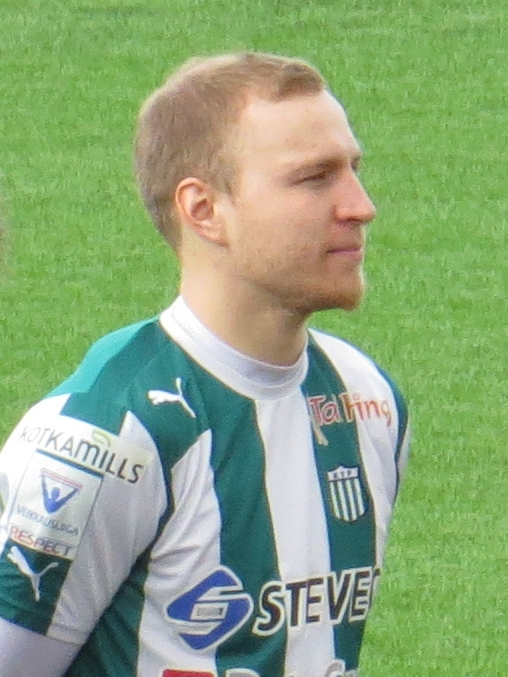
- Kaivonurmi in 2015

Personal information
- Date of birth: 3 March 1988 (age 38)
- Place of birth: Kuopio, Finland
- Height: 1.82 m (5 ft 11 1/2 in)
- Position: Forward

Senior career*
Years	Team	Apps	(Gls)
2004–2006	KuPS Akatemia	9	(4)
2006–2007	KuPS	14	(0)
2009	Warkaus JK	22	(24)
2010–2011	KuPS	23	(2)
2010	→ PK-37 (loan)	3	(2)
2011	→ PK-37 (loan)	2	(6)
2012–2015	KTP	83	(26)
- * Club domestic league appearances and goals

Samuli Kaivonurmi (born 3 March 1988) is a Finnish former professional footballer who played as a forward.
