= Sami Sanevuori =

Finnish footballer (born 1986)

Personal information
- Date of birth: 20 February 1986 (age 40)
- Place of birth: Raisio, Finland
- Height: 1.83 m (6 ft 0 in)
- Position: Left back

Youth career
- MaPS
- Inter Turku

Senior career*
Years	Team	Apps	(Gls)
2005	Inter Turku	2	(0)
2006	Nyköping	?	(?)
2007–2011	Inter Turku	85	(1)
2011	→ Lahti (loan)	6	(0)
2012–2015	Haka	74	(1)
2016–2018	PS-44		
- * Club domestic league appearances and goals

Sami Sanevuori (born 20 February 1986) is a Finnish former football player.

He was member of the Finland team in the 2003 FIFA U-17 World Championship, which were held in Finland.
