= Taavi Vartiainen =

Finnish ice hockey player

- Born: 30 June 1994 (age 30); Lahti, Finland
- Height: 6 ft 2 in (188 cm)
- Weight: 198 lb (90 kg; 14 st 2 lb)
- Position: Forward
- Shot: Left
- Played for: Lahti Pelicans; Ilves
- Playing career: 2014–2022

Taavi Vartiainen (born 30 June 1994) is a Finnish former professional ice hockey player. He played with Lahti Pelicans and Ilves in the Finnish Liiga.

Vartiainen made his Liiga debut playing with Lahti Pelicans during the 2014–15 Liiga season.
