= TamU-K =

Finnish football club

- Full name: Tampere Unitedin kannattajat ry
- Nicknames: Sinipaidat, Tampereen ylpeys
- Founded: 11 September 2009; 17 years ago
- Dissolved: 30 November 2015; 10 years ago
- Ground: Pyynikin urheilukenttä
- Chairman: Heikki Wilen
- Manager: Mika Suonsyrjä
Home colours	Away colours

TamU-K was a football club based in Tampere, Finland. It was founded in 2009 as a supporters' trust for Tampere United, who then played in the Finnish top division Veikkausliiga. After the Football Association of Finland banned Tampere United from Finnish football at the eve of the 2011 season under still-unproven allegations of third party influence in the club, the supporters' trust took upon themselves to maintain the club's legacy in Finnish football by starting a team in the bottom division Kutonen for the 2012 season. In the next four seasons the club earned three promotions, and handed over its spot in Kolmonen, the fourth highest level of football in Finland, back to Tampere United. Currently the club does not have any activities.

== History ==
TamU-K was founded by supporters of Tampere United on September 11, 2009, as a supporters’ trust. The aim was to gain a voice within the club and buy shares to the club when it hit financial difficulties. The original purpose of the supporters’ trust changed when the Tampere United was thrown out of Veikkausliiga in April 2011, and the football Association of Finland subsequently banned the club from all competitions. At this point the supporters' trust decided to enter a team into a recreational football league for the 2011 season. The limited company that ran Tampere United declared bankruptcy in the summer of 2011.

In 2012 TamU-K entered Kutonen, the division at the bottom of the Finnish football pyramid. After a successful regular season with 13 wins, one draw and two losses, the team earned promotion to Vitonen by winning two promotion playoff matches. The final match against Tahmelan Vesa, a 4–2 victory, was played at Pyynikki Stadium in front of a crowd of more than 400 people. In 2013 TamU-K played in Vitonen, and gained promotion to Nelonen by Finishing at the top of the table 16 points ahead of the second-place team (20 wins, 1 draw, 1 loss).

In 2014, in addition to the first team that played in Nelonen, the club had a second team playing in the bottom division Kutonen, and a third team in a recreational league. In addition, the club had six youth teams ranging from six-year-olds to seventeen-year-olds.

The 2014 TamU-K finished second in Nelonen. The season ended in a loss in the promotion playoff match away at FC Rauma. In 2015 TamU-K played another season in Nelonen, and earned promotion to Kolmonen. The deciding match, the last of the season, was a 2–1 win over FC Teivo, giving TamU-K a one-point advantage on the table against the second-place team Parolan Visa.

In the lead-up to the 2016 season all the teams playing under TamU-K were handed over to Tampere United, which is now a fan-owned club and controlled by the same supporters that founded and ran TamU-K.

== Club officials ==
- Chairman: Heikki Wilen
