= 2011 Ykkönen =

Ykkönen
- Season: 2011
- Champions: FC Lahti
- Promoted: FC Lahti
- Relegated: PS Kemi; FC PoPa; KPV; FC Espoo

The Ykkönen 2011 season began on 28 April 2011 and ended on 22 October 2011.

The winner team will qualify directly for promotion to Veikkausliiga 2012. The bottom 4 teams will qualify directly for relegation to Kakkonen.

== Overview ==
Location of teams in Ykkönen 2011

A total of thirteen teams will contest in the league, including ten sides from the 2010 season, FC Lahti who was relegated from Veikkausliiga, AC Oulu who was refused a license for Veikkausliiga and HIFK who promoted from Kakkonen after winning the promotion play-offs.

Club	Location	Stadium	Capacity	Manager
FC Espoo	Espoo	Leppävaaran stadion	5,000	(Finland) Jussi Nuorela
FC Hämeenlinna	Hämeenlinna	Kaurialan kenttä	8,000	(Finland) Jussi Lempinen
HIFK	Helsinki	Brahen kenttä	2,000	(Finland) Jani Honkavaara
JIPPO	Joensuu	Joensuun keskuskenttä	2,000	(Finland) Jarmo Korhonen
FC KooTeePee	Kotka	Arto Tolsa Areena	4,780	(Finland) Janne Hyppönen
KPV	Kokkola	Kokkolan keskuskenttä	3,000	(Finland) Henri Myntti
FC Lahti	Lahti	Lahden kisapuisto	4,000	(Finland) Tommi Kautonen
OPS	Oulu	Raatin Stadion	6,996	(Brazil) Luiz Antonio
AC Oulu	Oulu	Raatin Stadion	6,996	(Finland) Juha Malinen
PK-35 Vantaa	Vantaa	ISS Stadion	4,500	(Finland) Pasi Pihamaa
FC PoPa	Pori	Porin Stadion	12,000	(Finland) Tero Suonperä
PS Kemi	Kemi	Sauvosaari	1,500	(Finland) Juhani Himanka
FC Viikingit	Helsinki	Vuosaaren urheilukenttä	4,200	(Finland) Ilkka Jäntti

=== Managerial changes ===
Team	Outgoing manager	Manner of departure	Date of vacancy	Table	Incoming manager	Date of appointment	Table
KPV	(Finland) Keijo Hautamäki	Resigned	18 June 2011	10th	(Finland) Henri Myntti	4 July 2011	12th
FC PoPa	(Finland) Mika Halmetniemi	Sacked	4 July 2011	13th	(Finland) Tero Suonperä	8 July 2011	13th
PS Kemi	(Finland) Kalle Huusko	Sacked	9 August 2011	12th	(Finland) Juhani Himanka	9 August 2011	12th

== League table ==
Pos	Team	Pld	W	D	L	GF	GA	GD	Pts	Promotion or relegation
1	FC Lahti (C, P)	24	16	4	4	50	18	+32	52	Promotion to Veikkausliiga
2	OPS	24	15	4	5	46	26	+20	49	
3	AC Oulu	24	14	6	4	51	22	+29	48	
4	PK-35 Vantaa	24	13	5	6	38	19	+19	44	
5	FC Viikingit	24	13	4	7	50	28	+22	43	
6	FC KooTeePee	24	13	2	9	37	26	+11	41	
7	FC Hämeenlinna	24	9	6	9	30	34	−4	33	
8	JIPPO	24	6	12	6	24	20	+4	30	
9	HIFK	24	8	5	11	26	30	−4	29	
10	PS Kemi (R)	24	5	4	15	25	43	−18	19	Relegation to Kakkonen
11	FC PoPa (R)	24	6	1	17	23	58	−35	19	Relegation to Kakkonen
12	KPV (R)	24	4	4	16	19	58	−39	16	Relegation to Kakkonen
13	FC Espoo (R)	24	3	5	16	19	56	−37	14	Relegation to Kakkonen

Source: palloverkko.palloliitto.fi
Rules for classification: 1) points; 2) goal difference; 3) number of goals scored.
(C) Champions; (P) Promoted; (R) Relegated

== Results ==
Home \ Away	FCE	HÄM	HIFK	JIP	KTP	KPV	LAH	OPS	ACO	PKV	POP	PSK	VII
FC Espoo		0–0	0–2	1–1	1–1	2–3	0–7	1–2	0–1	2–1	1–3	1–1	3–2
FC Hämeenlinna	2–3		0–0	1–1	0–1	5–2	1–3	0–2	0–4	0–2	1–3	1–0	1–0
HIFK	3–0	0–1		1–1	0–2	4–0	0–2	1–2	1–3	1–0	3–1	0–1	3–2
JIPPO	3–0	2–2	0–0		1–0	1–1	0–0	0–0	1–1	1–0	1–2	2–0	2–1
FC KooTeePee	2–1	2–3	1–0	1–0		3–0	2–3	1–2	2–0	0–0	3–0	3–1	1–2
KPV	4–1	0–3	1–1	0–0	2–4		0–2	2–3	1–1	0–4	1–0	0–1	0–1
FC Lahti	3–0	4–0	1–0	2–1	2–0	1–0		1–2	1–2	1–1	4–0	3–1	2–1
OPS	3–1	0–0	3–0	1–0	1–2	2–0	1–1		0–1	1–2	7–0	2–1	1–1
AC Oulu	7–0	0–0	1–1	1–1	3–1	0–1	2–0	6–2		1–2	4–0	3–0	2–1
PK-35 Vantaa	1–0	2–1	3–2	1–0	1–0	5–0	1–1	1–3	0–2		3–0	5–0	0–0
FC PoPa	1–0	2–3	1–2	0–2	1–2	2–0	1–4	0–2	0–2	0–3		4–2	1–5
PS Kemi	2–0	1–3	0–1	2–2	1–3	4–0	1–2	0–1	2–2	3–0	0–0		1–3
FC Viikingit	1–1	0–2	4–0	2–1	1–0	8–1	1–0	4–3	5–2	0–0	3–1	2–0	

Source: palloverkko.palloliitto.fi
Legend: Blue = home team win; Yellow = draw; Red = away team win.

== Statistics ==
Updated to games played on 22 October 2011.

=== Top scorers ===
Source: soccerway.com

Rank	Player	Club	Goals
1	(Finland) Ville Salmikivi	FC Viikingit	20
2	(Canada) Randy Edwini-Bonsu	AC Oulu	16
3	(Finland) Jukka Santala	FC KooTeePee	13
4	(Finland) Dritan Stafsula	AC Oulu	12
5	(Brazil) Luizao	OPS	10
5	(Finland) Aleksi Ristola	PK-35 Vantaa	10
5	(Finland) Joni Korhonen	FC Viikingit	10
6	(Brazil) Luis Vanderlei	OPS	9
6	(Finland) Drilon Shala	FC Lahti	9
