= Joel Vartiainen =

Finnish footballer (born 1994)

Personal information
- Date of birth: 14 March 1994 (age 32)
- Place of birth: Finland
- Height: 1.75 m (5 ft 9 in)
- Position: Defender

Senior career*
Years	Team	Apps	(Gls)
2013–2021	KuPS	46	(2)
2014–2021	→ SC Kuopio Futis-98	60	(10)
- * Club domestic league appearances and goals as of 23 October 2021

Joel Vartiainen (born 14 March 1994) is a Finnish footballer.

== Career ==
In 2014, Vartiainen moved to the Finnish third division side SC Kuopio Futis-98 after playing for KuPS in the Finnish top flight. After that, he played college soccer for University of Central Florida.
