= 2014 Veikkausliiga =

Veikkausliiga
- Season: 2014
- Champions: HJK; 11th Veikkausliiga title 27th Finnish title
- Relegated: TPS; FC Honka; MYPA
- Champions League: HJK
- Europa League: SJK; FC Lahti; VPS
- Matches: 198
- Goals: 511 (2.58 per match)
- Top goalscorer: Jonas Emet, Luis Solignac (14 goals)
- Biggest home win: HJK 5–0 TPS (23 June)
- Biggest away win: FC Honka 0–5 FF Jaro (20 July); TPS 1–6 FC Inter (17 September)
- Highest scoring: MYPA 5–3 KuPS (27 July)
- Average attendance: 2,046

The 2014 Veikkausliiga was the 84th season of top-tier football in Finland. The league started on 6 April 2014 and ended on 25 October 2014. HJK Helsinki are the defending champions.

== Teams ==
JJK were relegated to Ykkönen after finishing at the bottom of the 2013 season. Their place was taken by Ykkönen champions SJK.

=== Team summaries ===
Location of teams in 2014 Veikkausliiga

Club	Location	Stadium	Capacity	Manager	Captain
FC Honka	Espoo	Tapiolan Urheilupuisto	6,000	(Finland) Shefki Kuqi	(Finland) Jussi Vasara
FC Inter	Turku	Veritas Stadion	10,000	(Netherlands) Job Dragtsma	(Finland) Henri Lehtonen
FC Lahti	Lahti	Lahden Stadion	15,000	(Finland) Toni Korkeakunnas	(Finland) Mikko Hauhia
FF Jaro	Jakobstad	Jakobstads Centralplan	5,000	(Finland) (Russia) Alexei Eremenko Sr.	(Finland) Jonas Emet
HJK	Helsinki	Sonera Stadium	10,770	(Finland) Mika Lehkosuo	(Finland) Teemu Tainio
IFK Mariehamn	Mariehamn	Wiklöf Holding Arena	4,000	(Finland) Pekka Lyyski	(Finland) Jani Lyyski
KuPS	Kuopio	Savon Sanomat Areena	5,000	(Finland) Marko Rajamäki	(Finland) Miikka Ilo
MYPA	Myllykoski, Kouvola	Kymenlaakson Sähkö Stadion	4,167	(Finland) Antti Muurinen	(Finland) Tuomas Aho
RoPS	Rovaniemi	Rovaniemen keskuskenttä	4,000	(Finland) Juha Malinen	(Finland) Antti Okkonen
SJK	Seinäjoki	Seinäjoen keskuskenttä	3,500	(Finland) Simo Valakari	(Serbia) Pavle Milosavljević
TPS	Turku	Veritas Stadion	10,000	(Finland) Mika Laurikainen	(Finland) Jukka Lehtovaara
VPS	Vaasa	Hietalahti Stadium	4,600	(Finland) Olli Huttunen	(Finland) Sebastian Strandvall

=== Managerial changes ===
Team	Outgoing manager	Manner of departure	Date of vacancy	Incoming manager	Date of appointment	Table
RoPS	(Finland) Kari Virtanen	End of contract	n/a	(Finland) Juha Malinen		Pre-season
FC Lahti	(Finland) Juha Malinen	End of contract	n/a	(Finland) Toni Korkeakunnas		Pre-season
MYPA	(Finland) Toni Korkeakunnas	End of contract	n/a	(Finland) Antti Muurinen		Pre-season
FC Honka	(Finland) Mika Lehkosuo	Sacked	7 February 2014	(Finland) Shefki Kuqi	15 February 2014	Pre-season
TPS	(Finland) Marko Rajamäki	Mutual termination	14 February 2014	(Finland) Mika Laurikainen	17 February 2014	Pre-season
KuPS	(Finland) Esa Pekonen	Mutual termination	24 April 2014	(Finland) Marko Rajamäki	2 May 2014	12th
HJK	(Finland) Sixten Boström	Sacked	29 April 2014	(Finland) Mika Lehkosuo	29 April 2014	6th

== League table ==
Pos	Team	Pld	W	D	L	GF	GA	GD	Pts	Qualification or relegation
1	HJK (C)	33	21	9	3	65	22	+43	72	Qualification to Champions League second qualifying round
2	SJK	33	16	11	6	40	26	+14	59	Qualification to Europa League first qualifying round
3	FC Lahti	33	15	13	5	45	23	+22	58	Qualification to Europa League first qualifying round
4	VPS	33	13	9	11	39	34	+5	48	Qualification to Europa League first qualifying round
5	IFK Mariehamn	33	14	6	13	49	55	−6	48	
6	FF Jaro	33	12	8	13	47	47	0	44	
7	KuPS	33	11	11	11	44	44	0	44	
8	MYPA (Note: MYPA were denied a licence for the 2015 season and were relegated to 2015 Ykkönen, however the team later decided to cease their operations) (R)	33	10	9	14	41	54	−13	39	Relegation to Ykkönen
9	FC Inter	33	8	12	13	42	47	−5	36	
10	RoPS	33	10	5	18	34	44	−10	35	
11	FC Honka (Note: FC Honka were denied a licence and they continue in the 2015 Kakkonen with a reserve team) (R)	33	6	13	14	38	57	−19	31	Relegation to Kakkonen
12	TPS (R)	33	6	6	21	29	60	−31	24	Relegation to Ykkönen

Source: veikkausliiga.com
Rules for classification: 1) Points; 2) Goal difference; 3) Number of goals scored
(C) Champions; (R) Relegated

== Results ==
=== Matches 1–22 ===
Home \ Away	HON	INT	LAH	JAR	HJK	MAR	KPS	MYP	RPS	SJK	TPS	VPS
FC Honka		3–1	1–0	1–1	1–1	2–2	2–2	1–2	1–0	1–1	1–1	1–2
FC Inter	2–2		0–1	0–1	0–2	0–2	1–1	1–0	4–1	2–1	2–1	0–0
FC Lahti	2–0	0–0		1–0	3–1	1–1	0–1	3–0	1–0	1–1	2–0	1–1
FF Jaro	3–3	0–2	2–1		0–2	1–0	3–2	1–1	1–1	0–1	2–0	1–0
HJK	2–2	2–0	0–0	1–0		1–0	3–1	4–0	3–0 (Note: The match originally finished 0–3, but the result was changed to 3–0, as RoPS fielded an ineligible player.)	1–0	0–1	3–0
IFK Mariehamn	4–1	2–2	0–0	1–3	0–2		3–1	2–1	2–0	2–2	3–1	0–3 (Note: The match originally finished 1–0, but the result was changed to 0–3, as IFK Mariehamn fielded ineligible players.)
KuPS	2–0	4–2	0–2	1–4	2–2	4–0		1–0	1–0	0–0	1–0	0–1
MYPA	4–3	1–1	1–1	3–2	0–1	3–0	2–0		1–1	1–3	4–1	1–1
RoPS	2–1	1–0	0–1	2–1	0–1	1–3	3–1	0–1		1–1	3–0	0–2
SJK	0–0	2–2	1–1	0–1	2–0	3–0	2–0	1–0	1–0		2–1	0–3
TPS	0–1	1–6	0–1	2–2	1–4	0–1	0–3	3–0	0–2	2–0		0–0
VPS	3–0	1–0	1–3	3–3	0–2	1–2	1–1	4–0	2–0	0–1	1–0	

Legend: Blue = home team win; Yellow = draw; Red = away team win.

=== Matches 23–33 ===
Home \ Away	HON	INT	LAH	JAR	HJK	MAR	KPS	MYP	RPS	SJK	TPS	VPS
FC Honka		2–1	1–1	0–5		1–1		2–0	0–2			
FC Inter					3–3		0–0			1–1	3–2	3–0
FC Lahti		0–0			0–2				3–4	1–1	2–0	4–1
FF Jaro		2–0	0–4		1–4						1–1	1–2
HJK	1–1					5–1	2–2	2–0		2–0	5–0	
IFK Mariehamn		3–1	0–1	4–2				3–1	2–4			1–0
KuPS	2–0		1–1	1–1		1–3			1–0			
MYPA		2–2	2–2	2–1			5–3				2–1	0–0
RoPS		3–0		0–1	0–0			0–0		1–2		
SJK	2–1			1–0		3–0	0–0	3–1				
TPS	2–1					3–1	1–1		4–2	0–1		
VPS	3–1				1–1		0–3		2–0	0–1	0–0	

Legend: Blue = home team win; Yellow = draw; Red = away team win.

== Statistics ==
=== Top scorers ===
Source: veikkausliiga.com (in Finnish)

As of 26 October 2014.

Rank	Player	Club	Goals
1	(Finland) Jonas Emet	FF Jaro	14
1	(Argentina) Luis Solignac	IFK Mariehamn	14
3	(Brazil) Rafael	FC Lahti	13
4	(Brazil) Diego Assis	IFK Mariehamn	11
4	(Finland) Petteri Forsell	IFK Mariehamn	11
4	(Finland) Akseli Pelvas	SJK	11
4	(The Gambia) Demba Savage	HJK	11
8	(Finland) Aleksandr Kokko	RoPS	9
8	(Finland) Roni Porokara	FC Honka / HJK	9
8	(Estonia) Ats Purje	KuPS	9
8	(Georgia (country)) Irakli Sirbiladze	FC Inter	9
8	(Trinidad and Tobago) Shahdon Winchester	FF Jaro	9
13	(Germany) Hendrik Helmke	FF Jaro	8
13	(Finland) Toni Lehtinen	SJK	8
15	6 players		7
21	10 players		6
31	6 players		5
37	10 players		4
47	26 players		3
73	24 players		2
97	61 players		1

== Monthly awards ==
Month	Coach of the Month	Player of the Month
April	(Finland) Antti Muurinen (MYPA)	(Germany) Hendrik Helmke (FF Jaro)
May	(Finland) Mika Lehkosuo (HJK)	(Finland) Rasmus Schüller (HJK)
June	(Finland) Simo Valakari (SJK)	(Sweden) Admir Ćatović (KuPS)
July	(Finland) Toni Korkeakunnas (FC Lahti)	(Finland) Henrik Moisander (FC Lahti)
August	(Finland) Pekka Lyyski (IFK Mariehamn)	(Finland) Petteri Forsell (IFK Mariehamn)
September	(Finland) Mika Lehkosuo (HJK)	(Finland) Erfan Zeneli (HJK)
October	(Finland) Olli Huttunen (VPS)	(Finland) Sebastian Standvall (VPS)

== Annual awards ==
Position	Player
Best Player	(Finland) Robin Lod (HJK)
Best Goalkeeper	(Finland) Henrik Moisander (FC Lahti)
Best Defender	(Ivory Coast) Cédric Gogoua (SJK)
Best Midfielder	(Finland) Robin Lod (HJK)
Best Striker	(Gabon) Demba Savage (HJK)
Best Manager	(Finland) Mika Lehkosuo (HJK)

== Attendances ==
No.	Club	Average
1	HJK	4,017
2	Lahti	2,698
3	SJK	2,287
4	VPS	2,201
5	TPS	2,167
6	KuPS	2,107
7	Inter Turku	1,786
8	Jaro	1,565
9	Honka	1,503
10	RoPS	1,455
11	MyPa	1,407
12	Mariehamn	1,302

== See also ==
- 2014 Ykkönen
- 2014 Kakkonen
