= Peimari United =

Association football club in Paimio, Finland

Peimari United is an association football club based in Paimio, Finland.

== History ==
Peimari United was founded in 2010.
