= 2015 Ykkönen =

Ykkönen
- Season: 2015
- Champions: PS Kemi
- Promoted: PS Kemi; PK-35 Vantaa
- Relegated: MP; VIFK
- Matches played: 135
- Goals scored: 396 (2.93 per match)
- Top goalscorer: Kalle Multanen (19 goals)
- Biggest home win: Haka 6–0 VIFK (17 June)
- Biggest away win: VIFK 0–4 JJK (23 May); FC Jazz 1–5 MP (22 June); VIFK 1–5 TPS (2 August); FC Jazz 0–4 PS Kemi (16 August); MP 0–4 PK-35 Vantaa (24 September)
- Highest scoring: Haka 4–4 EIF (21 May); FC Haka 7–4 VIFK (17 October)

The 2015 Ykkönen began on 2 May 2015 and ended on 17 October 2015. The winning team qualified directly for promotion to the 2016 Veikkausliiga 2016, while the second-placed team had to play a play-off against the eleventh-placed team from Veikkausliiga to decide who would play in that division. The bottom two teams were relegated to Kakkonen.

== Overview ==
Location of teams in Ykkönen 2015

A total of ten teams contested in the league, including five sides from the 2014 season, TPS who was relegated from Veikkausliiga, EIF and PS Kemi who promoted from Kakkonen after winning the promotion play-offs, VIFK, the winner of Kakkonen 2014 Western Group as a replacement for promoted Ilves and MP, the runner-up Kakkonen 2014 Eastern Group as a replacement for MYPA.

FC Viikingit and JIPPO were relegated from 2014 Ykkönen.

HIFK, the champion of 2014 Ykkönen, KTP, the runner-up of 2014 Ykkönen, and Ilves, which finished third in Ykkönen were promoted to the 2015 Veikkausliiga.

Club	Location	Stadium	Capacity	Manager
AC Oulu	Oulu	Raatin Stadion	6,996	(Finland) Rauno Ojanen
EIF	Raseborg	Ekenäs Centrumplan	2,500	(Finland) Jens Mattfolk
FC Jazz	Pori	Porin Stadion	12,000	(Wales) John Allen
Haka	Valkeakoski	Tehtaan kenttä	3,516	(Finland) Kari Martonen
JJK	Jyväskylä	Harjun stadion	3,000	(Finland) Juha Pasoja
MP	Mikkeli	Mikkelin Urheilupuisto	7,000	(Finland) Ilkka Mäkelä
PK-35 Vantaa	Vantaa	ISS Stadion	4,500	(Finland) Shefki Kuqi
PS Kemi	Kemi	Sauvosaari	2,500	(Finland) Jari Åhman
TPS	Turku	Urheilupuiston Yläkenttä	2,675	(Finland) Mika Laurikainen
VIFK	Vaasa	Hietalahti Stadium	4,600	(Finland) Tomi Kärkkäinen

=== Managerial changes ===
Team	Outgoing manager	Manner of departure	Date of vacancy	Incoming manager	Date of appointment	Table
FC Jazz	(Finland) Jani Uotinen	End of contract	n/a	(Wales) John Allen	30 October 2014	Pre-season
Haka	(Finland) Juho Rantala	End of contract	n/a	(Finland) Kari Martonen	17 November 2014	Pre-season
EIF	(Finland) Jari Rantanen	End of contract	n/a	(Finland) Jens Mattfolk	19 November 2014	Pre-season
PS Kemi	(England) Tommy Taylor	Personal reasons	5 January 2015	(Finland) Jari Åhman	9 January 2015	Pre-season
PK-35 Vantaa	(Finland) Jari Europaeus			(Finland) Shefki Kuqi	4 February 2015	Pre-season

== League table ==
Pos	Team	Pld	W	D	L	GF	GA	GD	Pts	Qualification or relegation
1	PS Kemi (P)	27	16	5	6	50	30	+20	53	Promotion to Veikkausliiga
2	PK-35 Vantaa (O, P)	27	15	4	8	53	25	+28	49	Qualification to Promotion playoffs
3	TPS	27	14	7	6	40	18	+22	49	
4	JJK	27	13	7	7	43	27	+16	46	
5	AC Oulu	27	12	8	7	31	28	+3	44	
6	Haka	27	11	8	8	48	41	+7	41	
7	FC Jazz	27	9	5	13	37	48	−11	32	
8	EIF	27	8	7	12	36	49	−13	31	
9	MP (R)	27	5	2	20	31	56	−25	17	Relegation to Kakkonen
10	VIFK (R)	27	3	5	19	27	74	−47	14	Relegation to Kakkonen

Source: Suomen Palloliitto
Rules for classification: 1) Points; 2) Goal difference; 3) Number of goals scored
(O) Play-off winners; (P) Promoted; (R) Relegated

== Results ==
=== Matches 1–18 ===
Home \ Away	ACO	EIF	JAZ	HAK	JJK	MP	PKV	PSK	TPS	VIFK
AC Oulu		2–1	1–0	1–2	1–0	1–0	1–3	2–0	0–0	3–2
EIF	0–2		1–1	3–1	1–1	1–0	0–3	1–0	0–1	1–1
FC Jazz	3–1	2–3		0–0	2–2	1–5	2–0	0–4	0–1	5–1
Haka	1–0	4–4	2–1		1–0	1–0	2–1	1–1	1–1	6–0
JJK	0–0	2–1	1–2	2–2		3–0	2–1	3–1	0–0	5–0
MP	3–3	0–1	3–2	3–4	1–0		0–2	0–1	0–2	1–1
PK-35 Vantaa	4–1	5–1	4–0	2–1	0–2	2–1		0–1	0–0	2–0
PS Kemi	0–0	4–1	4–1	3–2	0–1	2–1	0–0		1–0	2–1
TPS	1–0	1–0	0–2	3–0	0–1	5–0	2–0	0–3		5–0
VIFK	0–1	1–1	2–1	1–1	0–4	1–2	0–2	1–1	1–5	

Source: Suomen Palloliitto
Legend: Blue = home team win; Yellow = draw; Red = away team win.

=== Matches 19–27 ===
Home \ Away	ACO	EIF	JAZ	HAK	JJK	MP	PKV	PSK	TPS	VIFK
AC Oulu					1–1		3–2	3–1	1–1	1–0
EIF	0–1		0–0						4–1	3–4
FC Jazz	0–0			3–2	0–1	4–2				
Haka	1–1	0–1				2–0	1–0			7–4
JJK		5–1		2–2		3–2	0–2		0–3	
MP	2–0	2–4					0–4	2–3		
PK-35 Vantaa		2–2	3–1					5–2	0–0	4–0
PS Kemi		3–0	4–1	2–1	2–0					
TPS			0–1	2–0		2–1		1–1		3–1
VIFK			1–2		1–2	1–0		2–4		

Source: Suomen Palloliitto
Legend: Blue = home team win; Yellow = draw; Red = away team win.

== Statistics ==
=== Top scorers ===
Source: palloliitto.fi (in Finnish)

As of 17 October 2015.

Rank	Player	Club	Goals
1	(Finland) Kalle Multanen	Haka	19
2	(Spain) Pablo Couñago	PK-35 Vantaa	17
2	(England) Billy Ions	PS Kemi	17
4	(Finland) Jussi Aalto	TPS	11
5	(Finland) Elias Ahde	FC Jazz	9
5	(Finland) Antto Hilska	JJK	9
5	(Montenegro) Saša Jovović	PS Kemi	9
8	(Finland) Samu-Petteri Mäkelä	FC Jazz	8
9	(United States) Christian Eissele	PS Kemi	7
9	(Finland) Aleksis Lehtonen	JJK	7
9	(Finland) Lasse Linjala	VIFK	7
9	(Spain) Mateo	PK-35 Vantaa	7
9	(Finland) Masar Ömer	PK-35 Vantaa	7
9	(Finland) Ilkka Santahuhta	FC Jazz	7
9	(Finland) Robert Taylor	JJK	7
9	(Finland) Jasse Tuominen	MP	7
17	6 players		6
23	7 players		5
30	10 players		4
40	19 players		3
59	15 players		2
74	39 players		1

== Monthly awards ==
Month	Player of the Month
May	(Spain) Pablo Couñago (PK-35 Vantaa)
June	(Finland) Oskari Forsman (TPS)
July	(Finland) Mikko Manninen (JJK)
August	(Finland) Samu-Petteri Mäkelä (FC Jazz)
September	(Kosovo) Ymer Xhaferi (PK-35 Vantaa)

== See also ==
- 2015 Veikkausliiga
- 2015 Kakkonen
