= 2016 Finnish Cup =

Suomen Cup

Tournament details
- Country: Finland
- Teams: 125

Final positions
- Champions: SJK
- Runners-up: HJK

Tournament statistics
- Matches played: 124
- Goals scored: 507 (4.09 per match)

The 2016 Finnish Cup (Suomen Cup) is the 62nd season of the Finnish Cup. 125 clubs entered the competition.

== Teams ==
Round	Dates	Clubs involved	Winners from previous round	New entries this round	Leagues entering this round
First round	5 Jan 2016 – 23 Jan 2016	14	−	14	Kolmonen and lower levels (14 teams)
Second round	10 Jan 2016 – 6 Feb 2016	80	7	73	Kolmonen and lower levels (73 teams)
Third round	5 Feb 2016 – 21 Feb 2016	40	40	–	
Fourth round	5 Mar 2016 – 19 Mar 2016	52	20	32	Kakkonen (17 teams); Ykkönen (9 teams); Veikkausliiga (6 teams)
Fifth round	19 Mar 2016 – 5 Apr 2016	32	26	6	Veikkausliiga (6 teams)
Sixth round	19 Apr 2016 – 21 Apr 2016	16	16	–	
Quarter-finals	15 June 2016	8	8	–	

== First round ==
14 teams played in the first round.

5 January 2016	Tolsa	0–11	NuPS	Espoo
21:05 (EET)		Report	Pyyhtiä 2', 58'; Joakim 26', 39', 42'; Limnell 29', 36'; Ossian 61', 71', 74'; Lundsten 79'	Stadium: Esport Arena; Referee: Juho Luukkanen

9 January 2016	Jäppärä	0–14	Honka Academy	Espoo
20:00 (EET)		Report	Jokela 9'; Karppinen 13'; Lutumba-Pitah 17', 19', 55'; Puhalainen 21', 35'; Lindfors 26'; Nieminen 61'; Innala 67'; Broman 68'; Londono 71', 80'	Stadium: Esport Arena; Attendance: 30; Referee: Amir Hajizadeh

10 January 2016	JanPa	2–2 (3–5 p)	HJS Academy	Hämeenlinna
20:00 (EET)	Suhonen 10', 45'	Report	Länsimaa 2' (pen.), 28'	Stadium: Säästöpankki-Areena; Attendance: 88; Referee: Teemu Pylkkänen
	Penalties
	Kinnunen (penalty scored); Paloposki (penalty scored); Jortikka (penalty missed); Rantanen (penalty scored)		Latvanen (penalty scored); Kalervo (penalty scored); Länsimaa (penalty scored); Riihimäki (penalty scored); Joenmäki (penalty scored)

16 January 2016	Gnistan/Ogeli	3–1	HIFK/4	Helsinki
09:30 (EET)	Pitkänen 12' (pen.); Selin 25'; Tuomi 39'	Report	Aakko 59'	Stadium: Tali halli Attendance: 18; Referee: Kari Mantere

17 January 2016	SUMU/Sob	1–3	LPS	Helsinki
20:00 (EET)	Tiusanen 75'	Report	Hänninen 8'; Huhanantti 24', 62'	Stadium: Tali halli Attendance: 50; Referee: Jonathan Mainz

23 January 2016	ToTe	0–0 (4–2 p)	Töölön Taisto	Helsinki
18:45 (EET)		Report		Stadium: Tali halli Attendance: 50; Referee: Janne Juote
	Penalties
	Gylling (penalty scored); Peter (penalty scored); Lehtonen (penalty scored); Jantunen (penalty missed); Muse (penalty scored)		Aardemäe (penalty scored); Ahola (penalty missed); Lassila (penalty missed); Laakkonen (penalty scored)

23 January 2016	PaiHa	0–0 (1–3 p)	Peimari United	Paimio
18:45 (EET)		Report		Stadium: Paimio KHT; Attendance: 178; Referee: Joni Hyytiä
	Penalties
	Kytösaho (penalty scored); Sarparanta (penalty missed); Laaksonen (penalty missed); Lähderinne (penalty missed)		Adimar (penalty scored); Ju (penalty missed); Habte (penalty scored); Laine (penalty scored)

== Second round ==
80 teams played in the second round.

10 January 2016	JoPS	4–5	JIPPO	Joensuu
12:00 (EET)	Ruisniemi 26'; Kortelainen 50'; Ekroos 54', 79'	Report	Tolvanen 2'; Koistinen 20', 80+1'; Mononen 33'; Kuosmanen 39'	Stadium: Joensuu Areena; Attendance: 270; Referee: Ilpo Simone

10 January 2016	SC Riverball	2–2 (a.e.t.) (7–6 p)	FC Villiketut	Joensuu
21:15 (EET)	Nevalainen 32'; Naakka 80+5'	Report	Ala-Porkkunen 17'; Tammelin 72'	Stadium: Joensuu Areena; Referee: Hannu Kettunen
	Penalties
	Pirskanen (penalty scored); Nevalainen (penalty scored); Savolainen (penalty scored); Mononen (penalty missed); Naakka (penalty missed); Kareinen (penalty scored); Saarela (penalty scored)		Ala-Porkkunen (penalty scored); Huvila (penalty scored); Rautamies (penalty missed); Tammelin (penalty missed); Purokuru (penalty scored); Tiilikka (penalty scored); Ervasti (penalty missed)

13 January 2016	JoKi	0–0 (3–5 p)	Korso United	Tuusula
20:00 (EET)		Report		Stadium: Jokelan TN; Attendance: 30; Referee: Jarno Eväkoski
	Penalties
	Palonen (penalty scored); Kyander (penalty scored); Aaltonen (penalty scored); Lappalainen (penalty missed)		Hopia (penalty scored); Nousiainen (penalty scored); Tiiperi (penalty scored); Kauppala (penalty scored); Kuoremäki (penalty scored)

16 January 2016	SUMU	0–1	PPJ	Helsinki
17:15 (EET)		Report	Kemppainen 22'	Stadium: Tali halli Attendance: 30; Referee: Markus Lehtola

16 January 2016	Aztecas	1–3	Kontu	Helsinki
19:00 (EET)	Enayati 70'	Report	Tukiainen 2', 16'; Ilola 9'	Stadium: Tali halli Attendance: 80; Referee: Kari Aaltio

17 January 2016	Inter 2	0–6	P-Iirot	Turku
18:00 (EET)		Report	Valtanen 5'; Patola 8', 59', 73'; Kuusio 23'; Marchiș 25'	Stadium: Kupittaa 5 KHT; Attendance: 21; Referee: Sami Lamp

17 January 2016	LaPa	0–4	KUMU Edustus	Imatra
18:00 (EET)		Report	Behm 17'; Inkilä 56'; Mäkinen 66'; Piirala 80+4'	Stadium: Aviasport Areena; Attendance: 12; Referee: Sauli Bai

17 January 2016	NePa	0–3	Härmä	Tampere
18:00 (EET)		Report	Thusberg 24'; Ekholm 50'; Mäkelä 63'	Stadium: Pirkkahalli C Referee: Atte Jussila

19 January 2016	NuPS	1–1 (a.e.t.) (4–2 p)	PKKU	Vihti
20:00 (EET)	Lundsten 70'	Report	Olander 56'	Stadium: Ratapuisto TN; Attendance: 40; Referee: Gezim Arifi
	Penalties
	Julie (penalty scored); Mahlio (penalty scored); Järvensivu (penalty missed); Kokkila (penalty scored); Kaalamo (penalty scored)		Bergman (penalty scored); Velakoski (penalty missed); Haapalainen (penalty scored); Puljujärvi (penalty missed)

22 January 2016	Tervarit-j/JuPa	4–0	OuTa	Oulu
20:00 (EET)	Lilleberg 18'; Viitajylhä 22', 73'; Komulainen 36'	Report		Stadium: Heinäpää PH TN; Attendance: 52; Referee: Jani Kivelä

23 January 2016	TuPS/Skavaboys	1–1 (7–8 p)	Pelikaani	Tuusula
12:00 (EET)	Nygård 38'	Report	J. Pätäri 80+1'	Stadium: Tuusula UK TN; Attendance: 15; Referee: Kadir Kosar
	Penalties
	Jo. Kahila (penalty scored); Je. Kahila (penalty scored); Sipiläinen (penalty scored); Ju. Anttila (penalty missed); Jo. Anttila (penalty missed); Iivari (penalty scored); Ahonen (penalty scored); Rikka (penalty missed)		Kallio (penalty scored); Harainen (penalty scored); Vilen (penalty missed); J. Pätäri (penalty missed); T. Pätäri (penalty scored); Porokuokka (penalty scored); Kaverinen (penalty scored); Kylmälä (penalty scored)

23 January 2016	HauPa	0–0 (4–3 p)	SoPa	Oulu
13:30 (EET)		Report		Stadium: Heinäpää PH TN; Referee: Ben Ameur Ghazi
	Penalties
	Tuominen (penalty scored); Paldan (penalty scored); Kovalainen (penalty scored); Isokangas (penalty missed); Autioniemi (penalty scored)		Uusitalo (penalty scored); Pettersson (penalty missed); Suopanki (penalty missed); Lindholm (penalty scored); Apukka (penalty scored)

23 January 2016	AKT	0–4	MynPa	Turku
20:00 (EET)		Report	Havia 13'; Termaat 17'; Kivilä 51'; Sainio 75'	Stadium: Kupittaa 5 KHT; Referee: Marios Steliou

23 January 2016	JFC	1–1 (5–3 p)	SUMU-77	Helsinki
20:15 (EET)	Miettinen 67' (pen.)	Report	Bright 35'	Stadium: Tali halli TN; Referee: Esa Kallio
	Penalties
	Törmälä (penalty scored); Eskelinen (penalty scored); Miettinen (penalty scored); Salo (penalty scored); Minkkinen (penalty scored)		Adams (penalty scored); Jääskeläinen (penalty scored); Strömberg (penalty scored) (penalty missed)

24 January 2016	Kasiysi	0–3	HooGee	Espoo
14:00 (EET)		Report	Lindfors 11'; Huttunen 13'; Nykopp 18'	Stadium: Laaksolahti TN; Attendance: 10; Referee: Gezim Arifi

24 January 2016	Sääripotku	1–5	JBK	Kokkola
18:00 (EET)	Välikangas 21'	Report	Särkiniemi 29', 30'; Häggblom 65' (pen.), 78'; Sumit 71'	Stadium: Kippari Hall; Attendance: 70; Referee: Pasi Tuurinmaa

24 January 2016	HJK/Lsalo	1–8	Atletico Malmi	Helsinki
20:00 (EET)	Grönlund 30'	Report	Jukka 25', 34'; Ketonen 29'; Mattsson 33' (pen.); Okomoh 49'; Huupponen 70'; Säynätkari 79'; Ketonen 80' (pen.)	Stadium: Tali halli TN; Attendance: 30; Referee: Vesa-Pekka Peltonen

26 January 2016	Honka Academy	4–2	SibboV	Espoo
20:15 (EET)	Maarno 28'; Lutumba-Pitah 14'; Yassin 53'; Londono 60'	Report	Brunou 11', 31'	Stadium: Laaksolahti halli TN; Attendance: 69; Referee: Peiman Simani

28 January 2016	NJS	6–0	HyPS	Nurmijärvi
19:00 (EET)	Kilpeläinen 1', 18'; Murtomaa 14' (pen.), 40' (pen.), 76'; Järvenpää 61'	Report		Stadium: Klaukkala 1 TN; Attendance: 80; Referee: Gezim Arifi

28 January 2016	Legirus Inter	8–1	TuPS	Vantaa
20:00 (EET)	Honkanen 11' (o.g.); Cózar 19' (pen.); Ravi 21' (o.g.); Heikkilä 36'; Jegor 57', 74'; Safiyari 80' (pen.); Ojeda 80+2'	Report	Närhi 55'	Stadium: Kalmuuri TN; Attendance: 100; Referee: Peiman Simani

28 January 2016	Kuopion Elo	3–0	LehPa-77	Kuopio
20:30 (EET)	Räsänen 9'; Sallinen 54' (o.g.); Pentikäinen 56'	Report		Stadium: Kuopion kuplahalli Attendance: 23; Referee: Mikko Saastamoinen

28 January 2016	HAlku	0–5	RiPS	Sipoo
20:30 (EET)		Report	Eskolin 12', 51'; Palomäki 28', 59', 77'	Stadium: Söderkullan TN; Referee: Ossi Korvenaho

29 January 2016	OTP	2–0	Takinkääntäjät	Oulu
18:15 (EET)	Deng 43'; Knape 58'	Report		Stadium: Heinäpään jalkapallohalli Attendance: 130; Referee: Atte Räinä

29 January 2016	SJK-j Apollo	3–2	SIF	Seinäjoki
18:30 (EET)	Muurimäki 47', 73'; Nikupeteri 57'	Report	Söderlund 67'; Karv 80+1'	Stadium: WallSport-Areena; Attendance: 140; Referee: Pauli Hietamäki

29 January 2016	PEKA	3–2	Peltirumpu	Kotka
19:00 (EET)	Oksanen 23'; Mudahemuka 32'; Raanti 42'	Report	Räikkönen 12', 58'	Stadium: Kotka urheiluhalli TN; Attendance: 68; Referee: Kari Vantola

29 January 2016	SC Wolves	3–1	Boda	Hämeenlinna
19:30 (EET)	Masalin 1', 9'; Hilden 36'	Report	Lindroos 4'	Stadium: Pulleri tekonurmi Attendance: 30; Referee: Niko Mättö

29 January 2016	Kiisto	3–2	KPS	Vaasa
19:30 (EET)	Lombo 14'; Nyman 51'; Joensuu 64'	Report	Hämäläinen 3'; Kivinen 80'	Stadium: Botniahalli; Attendance: 50; Referee: Suad Lulic

29 January 2016	PPJ/Taalerit	0–2	PEF	Helsinki
20:30 (EET)		Report	Ahola 38'; Hyötylä 78'	Stadium: Tali halli TN; Attendance: 4 Referee: Eemeli Könkkölä

30 January 2016	Tampere United	5–2	TP-T	Tampere
11:00 (EET)	Saari 9'; Lehti 24'; Koljonen 52', 55'; Alanen 70'	Report	Lekkermäki 21'; Hakanen 25'	Stadium: Pirkkahalli C Attendance: 368; Referee: Atte Jussila

30 January 2016	HJS Academy	6–0	FJK	Hämeenlinna
15:00 (EET)	Länsimaa 23', 47', 56'; Huhtapelto 68', 75'; Suomalainen 71'	Report		Stadium: Pulleri tekonurmi Attendance: 94; Referee: Teemu Pylkkänen

30 January 2016	Kasiysi/Rocky	3–1	FC Pato	Espoo
16:00 (EET)	Ruotsalainen 23', 44'; Arvola 28'	Report	Vanhatalo 41'	Stadium: Laaksolahti TN; Attendance: 25; Referee: Kadir Kosar

30 January 2016	ToTe	2–0	HIFK/3	Helsinki
18:00 (EET)	Reitala 15'; Lindfors 73'	Report		Stadium: Töölö PK 6 TN; Attendance: 20; Referee: Soran Enayati

30 January 2016	NJS/2	1–3	LoPa	Vihti
18:15 (EET)	Jussila 40'	Report	Ruokonen 7', 56'; Harja 43'	Stadium: Ratapuisto halli Attendance: 65; Referee: Antti Ranta-Aho

30 January 2016	Harjun Potku	2–2 (a.e.t.) (3–4 p)	Ilves 2	Jyväskylä
20:00 (EET)	Kivelä 17', 80' (pen.)	Report	Nummela 51'; Raittinen 56' (pen.)	Stadium: Vehkahalli; Attendance: 42; Referee: Ville Minkkinen
	Penalties
	Malinen (penalty scored); Piippa (penalty scored); Komppa (penalty missed); Kivelä (penalty missed); Peitsaho (penalty scored)		Raittinen (penalty scored); Stark (penalty missed); Ahonpää (penalty scored); Nummela (penalty scored); Sola (penalty scored)

30 January 2016	CLE	1–2	Töölön Vesa	Helsinki
20:00 (EET)	Enckell 42'	Report	Leppänen 10', 39'	Stadium: Tali halli TN; Attendance: 35; Referee: Tuomas Määttä

31 January 2016	KelA	1–2	I-HK	Vantaa
15:30 (EET)	Sundström 56'	Report	Tallqvist 13' (pen.); Maaranen 80+3' (pen.)	Stadium: Kalmuuri TN; Attendance: 30; Referee: Gezim Arifi

31 January 2016	LPS	2–1	HPS	Helsinki
19:30 (EET)	Rihtniemi 35'; Laitila 74'	Report	Basili 37'	Stadium: Töölö PK 6 TN; Referee: Johan Staffans

31 January 2016	Gnistan/Ogeli	4–2	Gnistan/2	Helsinki
20:00 (EET)	Forsen 14', 27'; Laitinen 19'; Pitkänen 40+2'	Report	Häyrynen 9'; Murto 60'	Stadium: Oulunkylä TN; Attendance: 4 Referee: Toni Mustonen

31 January 2016	SexyPöxyt	0–5	EPS	Espoo
20:00 (EET)		Report	Palmroos 34'; Jalonen 38', 42' (pen.); Hollmen 57'; Barkat 70'	Stadium: Laaksolahti TN; Attendance: 64

6 February 2016	Peimari United	w/o	JIK
		Report

== Third round ==
40 teams played in the third round.

5 February 2016	JIPPO	2–0	SC Riverball	Joensuu
17:00 (EET)	Vainikainen 26'; Hallikainen 43'	Report		Stadium: Joensuu Areena; Attendance: 324; Referee: Hannu Kettunen

6 February 2016	Pelikaani	0–8	Korso United	Tuusula
16:00 (EET)		Report	Kuoremäki 3'; Pätäri 35' (o.g.); Lappalainen 44', 55'; Hopia 49'; Savolainen 65', 76'; Johansson 72'	Stadium: Jokelan TN; Attendance: 50; Referee: Mick Grönroos

10 February 2016	HooGee/2	1–1 (2–4 p)	Honka Academy	Espoo
19:00 (EET)	Blomqvist 43'	Report	Räsänen 46'	Stadium: Matinkylä TN; Attendance: 30; Referee: Tuukka Hannukkala

11 February 2016	NJS	0–1	Kontu	Nurmijärvi
19:00 (EET)		Report	Tolppa 29' (pen.)	Stadium: Klaukkala 1 TN; Attendance: 70; Referee: Peiman Simani

11 February 2016	KUMU Edustus	2–5	RiPS	Kouvola
20:30 (EET)	Inkilä 40' (pen.), 73' (pen.)	Report	Valtteri 4'; Saikkonen 22', 68'; Palomäki 33'; Parjanen 56' (pen.)	Stadium: Sami Hyypiä Areena; Attendance: 50; Referee: Niko Hänninen

13 February 2016	Härmä	2–1	Ilves 2	Hämeenlinna
17:15 (EET)	Thusberg 6'; Lindroos 22'	Report	Järvelä 20'	Stadium: Pulleri tekonurmi Attendance: 62; Referee: Juuso Vuorinen

18 February 2016	PEF	2–3	NuPS	Vihti
19:00 (EET)	Syväoja 24', 31'	Report	Koivulahti 7', 14', 22'	Stadium: Ratapuisto TN; Referee: Gezim Arifi

18 February 2016	Legirus Inter	8–0	LPS	Vantaa
20:00 (EET)	Heikkilä 3', 40', 49'; Ojeda 7'; Kibona 27', 37'; Subirats 47'; Cózar 78'	Report		Stadium: Kalmuuri TN; Attendance: 50; Referee: Tuukka Hannukkala

19 February 2016	SC Wolves	1–0	MynPa	Paimio
19:30 (EET)	Vainio 64'	Report		Stadium: Paimio KHT; Attendance: 15; Referee: Aleksi Makkonen

19 February 2016	SJK-j Apollo	0–2	JBK	Seinäjoki
20:00 (EET)		Report	Knuts 30'; Strömbäck 80'	Stadium: WallSport-Areena; Attendance: 105; Referee: Kevin Östergård

19 February 2016	JFC	0–2	Töölön Vesa	Helsinki
21:00 (EET)		Report	Rahko 58'; Malmström 80+5'	Stadium: Tali halli TN

19 February 2016	HauPa	0–0 (2–3 p)	OTP	Oulu
21:00 (EET)		Report		Stadium: Heinäpää PH TN; Attendance: 200; Referee: Pietu Niinimäki

20 February 2016	Gnistan/Ogeli	2–3	EPS	Helsinki
11:00 (EET)	Forsen 10'; Selin 22'	Report	Hollmen 30'; Jalonen 51', 64'	Stadium: Oulunkylä TN; Attendance: 45; Referee: Larbi Boughdiri

20 February 2016	Tervarit-j/JuPa	0–2	Kiisto	Oulu
16:00 (EET)		Report	Lombo 66'; Ruin 80'	Stadium: Heinäpää PH TN; Attendance: 80; Referee: Esa Suoyrjö

20 February 2016	HJS Academy	1–1 (3–5 p)	Tampere United	Hämeenlinna
18:00 (EET)	Länsimaa 25' (pen.)	Report	Saari 64'	Stadium: Pulleri tekonurmi Attendance: 250; Referee: Juuso Vuorinen
	Penalties
	Suomalainen (penalty missed); Kalervo (penalty scored); Länsimaa (penalty scored); Riihimäki (penalty scored)		Saari (penalty scored); Uimonen (penalty scored); Popovitch (penalty scored); Kytöviita (penalty scored); Rasva (penalty scored)

20 February 2016	LoPa	3–1	PPJ	Vihti
19:45 (EET)	Talvasto 53'; Ruokonen 57'; Vuorela 80+2'	Report	Koivisto 77'	Stadium: Ratapuisto TN; Attendance: 25; Referee: Sami Katko

21 February 2016	Peimari United	1–4	P-Iirot	Paimio
14:00 (EET)	Salonico 14'	Report	Patola 25' (pen.); Valtanen 51'; Ojanen 65', 80+3'	Stadium: Paimio KHT; Attendance: 70; Referee: Ville Käldström

21 February 2016	Kasiysi/Rocky	1–2	Atletico Malmi	Espoo
14:30 (EET)	Ruotsalainen 68' (pen.)	Report	Tenkanen 26'; Ketonen 38'	Stadium: Laaksolahti TN; Attendance: 45; Referee: Kadir Kosar

21 February 2016	ToTe	3–1	I-HK	Helsinki
16:15 (EET)	Lehtonen 45'; Komu 80'; Reitala 80+3'	Report	Lehtinen 25'	Stadium: Tali halli TN; Attendance: 120; Referee: Joona Manninen

21 February 2016	Kuopion Elo	0–3	PeKa	Kuopio
18:30 (EET)		Report	Nykänen 35' (pen.); Liski 43'; Oksanen 70'	Stadium: Kuopion kuplahalli Attendance: 20; Referee: Matti Roth

== Fourth round ==
52 teams played in the fourth round.

5 March 2016	NuPS	0–6	HIFK	Vihti
12:30 (EET)		Report	Korhonen 9', 43'; Peltonen 10'; Jurvainen 14', 39'; Salmikivi 21'	Stadium: Kuoppanummen nurmi Attendance: 400; Referee: Dennis Antamo

5 March 2016	P-Iirot	5–1	Härmä	Rauma
14:00 (EET)	Patola 8', 48', 52' (pen.); Pertola 79'; Kuusio 83'	Report	Ramadani 28'	Stadium: Äijänsuo Stadium; Attendance: 120; Referee: Saku Peltonen

5 March 2016	AC Oulu	0–3	FF Jaro	Oulu
14:00 (EET)		Report	Eremenko 11'; Soto 12'; Morín 90+1'	Stadium: Heinäpää PH TN; Attendance: 366; Referee: Esa Suoyrjö

6 March 2016	Tampere United	0–4 (a.e.t.)	TPS	Tampere
18:15 (EET)		Report	Sjöroos 104'; Blomqvist 110'; Rähmönen 117'; Mettälä 120'	Stadium: Pirkkahalli C Attendance: 441; Referee: Atte Jussila

6 March 2016	ToTe	0–3	JäPS	Helsinki
20:00 (EET)		Report	Lähde 55'; Partonen 62', 80'	Stadium: Tali halli Attendance: 100; Referee: Oskari Hämäläinen

8 March 2016	EPS	2–2 (a.e.t.) (1–3 p)	Honka Academy	Espoo
20:00 (EET)	Hollmen 53', 74'	Report	Hirvonen 37'; Maarno 45'	Stadium: Espoonlahti 2 TN; Attendance: 200; Referee: Haus Fathulla
	Penalties
	Leinonen (penalty missed); Luhtanen (penalty scored); Hollmen (penalty missed); Haverinen (penalty missed)		Räsänen (penalty scored); Lindfors (penalty missed); Nieminen (penalty scored); Lehtovuori (penalty scored)

11 March 2016	JIPPO	3–1	PeKa	Joensuu
20:00 (EET)	Tolvanen 45'; Sormunen 52'; Pussinen 90+3'	Report	Balkiran 49'	Stadium: Joensuu Arena; Attendance: 384; Referee: Hannu Kettunen

11 March 2016	Korso United	0–5	JJK	Vantaa
20:00 (EET)		Report	Järvinen 11'; Abahassine 22'; Lähitie 27'; Manninen 50'; Tahvanainen 73'	Stadium: Tikkurila TN; Attendance: 220; Referee: Tuukka Hannukkala

12 March 2016	SalPa	0–2	Ilves	Salo
13:15 (EET)		Report	Hilska 80', 85'	Stadium: Salon Urheilupuisto; Attendance: 283; Referee: Pouria Notash

12 March 2016	JBK	1–5	AC Kajaani	Jakobstad
13:45 (EET)	Remesaho 88'	Report	Hajizadeh 33'; Joksts 36' (pen.); Ibiyomi 47', 80'; Lahnalakso 62'	Stadium: Tellushallen; Attendance: 102; Referee: Jockum Nygård

12 March 2016	FC Espoo	0–3	FC Jazz	Espoo
15:00 (EET)		Report	Välilä 54'; Koskinen 81'; Riihimäki 86'	Stadium: Espoonlahti 1 TN; Attendance: 109; Referee: Juho Luukkanen

12 March 2016	Atletico Malmi	1–0	Gnistan	Helsinki
16:00 (EET)	Ketonen 18'	Report		Stadium: Tapanila TN; Attendance: 255; Referee: Tommi Grönman

12 March 2016	SC Wolves	0–2	MuSa	Paimio
16:00 (EET)		Report	Vainionpää 25'; Rostedt 81'	Stadium: Paimio KHT; Attendance: 69; Referee: Samuli Stenman

12 March 2016	OTP	1–2	Närpes Kraft	Oulu
16:30 (EET)	Dziadulewicz 11'	Report	Mujkić 37'; Granfors 84'	Stadium: Heinäpään jalkapallohalli Attendance: 80; Referee: Atte Räinä

12 March 2016	RiPS	0–8	Lahti Akatemia	Hyvinkää
17:00 (EET)		Report	Saastamoinen 11', 56'; Hyvönen 35', 86'; Tanskanen 67'; Sadik 75'; Köse 78'; Camacho 82'	Stadium: Kankurin TN; Attendance: 150; Referee: Gezim Arifi

12 March 2016	FC Åland	1–4	Inter Turku	Eckerö
19:00 (EET)	Amani 90+2'	Report	Gnabouyou 22'; Duah 28', 40'; Salminen 90'	Stadium: Eckeröhallen; Attendance: 150; Referee: Daniel Melander

12 March 2016	Kontu	1–4	KäPa	Helsinki
20:00 (EET)	Miettinen 79'	Report	Mäkinen 42'; Tainio 45+1' (pen.); Akbar 82', 90+3'	Stadium: Tali halli TN; Attendance: 157; Referee: Topias Tuira

13 March 2016	GBK	1–3	PS Kemi	Kokkola
15:30 (EET)	Carlsson 43'	Report	Ions 47', 67'; Jovović 82'	Stadium: Kippari Hall; Attendance: 201; Referee: Daniel Enkvist

13 March 2016	EsPa	3–6 (a.e.t.)	FC Haka	Espoo
16:00 (EET)	Pirhonen 32'; P.V.Korhonen 43'; Ngum 86'	Report	Fowler 11'; Mäkelä 83', 120' (pen.); Mäenpää 84'; Intala 101'; Mbachu 118'	Stadium: Matinkylä TN; Attendance: 445; Referee: Peiman Simani

13 March 2016	LoPa	0–5	Honka	Lohja
18:45 (EET)		Report	Jouini 54', 78', 85'; Melo 62'; N'Sombo 90'	Stadium: Kisakallio TN; Attendance: 189; Referee: Tuukka Hannukkala

13 March 2016	Töölön Vesa	0–6	Legirus Inter	Helsinki
20:00 (EET)		Report	Chidi 19', 87'; Ojeda 23'; Cózar 54', 77'; Halonen 79'	Stadium: Tali halli TN; Attendance: 50; Referee: Oscar Tuomi

18 March 2016	KTP	1–2 (a.e.t.)	PK-35 Vantaa	Kotka
18:30 (EET)	Ikävalko 6'	Report	Kaufmann 13'; Heimonen 114'	Stadium: Arto Tolsa Areena; Attendance: 365; Referee: Jussi Vainikka

18 March 2016	MP	0–3	KuPS	Mikkeli
18:30 (EET)		Report	Alaharjula 48'; Mahanen 75'; Egwuekwe 78'	Stadium: Urpola TN; Attendance: 387; Referee: Mikko Matilainen

19 March 2016	Kiisto	2–2 (a.e.t.) (3–5 p)	Hercules	Kokkola
14:00 (EET)	Lombo 4', 72'	Report	Ogbuefi 21' (pen.); Haapala 90+6'	Stadium: Botniahalli; Referee: Rasmus Hietanen
	Penalties
	Lombo (penalty scored); Karri (penalty scored); Inki (penalty scored); Takala (penalty missed)		Haapala (penalty scored); Suomela (penalty scored); Tapio (penalty scored); Ogbuefi (penalty scored); Karhunen (penalty scored)

19 March 2016	TPV	1–0	EIF	Tampere
16:30 (EET)	Kiiveri 41'	Report		Stadium: Pirkkahalli C Attendance: 295; Referee: Veli-Matti Kanerva

19 March 2016	TP-47	0–3	KPV	Tornio
20:00 (EET)		Report	Luokkala 39'; Sirbiladze 51'; Palosaari 72'	Stadium: Junkohalli TN; Attendance: 124; Referee: Sami Väntti

== Fifth round ==
32 teams played in the Fifth round.

19 March 2016	Honka Academy	1–3	HJK	Espoo
14:00 (EET)	Pehlivan 89'	Report	Jalasto 35', 85'; Forssell 51'	Stadium: Tapiolan Urheilupuisto; Attendance: 240; Referee: Joonas Kovapohja

19 March 2016	FF Jaro	0–2	VPS	Jakobstad
15:15 (EET)		Report	Vahtera 56'; Tamminen 65'	Stadium: Tellushallen; Attendance: 641; Referee: Mikko Lehtola

20 March 2016	AC Kajaani	4–0	P-Iirot	Kajaani
18:30 (EET)	Ibiyomi 26', 36'; Hajizadeh 65'; Heikkinen 80'	Report		Stadium: Kajaanin Pallohalli; Attendance: 82; Referee: Matti Roth

22 March 2016	KäPa	0–2	Inter Turku	Helsinki
18:30 (EET)		Report	Källman 57', 61'	Stadium: Oulunkylä TN; Attendance: 231

23 March 2016	Honka	4–4 (a.e.t.) (6–5 p)	TPS	Espoo
19:00 (EET)	Perovuo 16'; Otaru 68'; Jouini 90+3'; Weckström 93'	Report	Virtanen 27', 30'; Blomqvist 83'; Hyyrynen 98'	Stadium: Esport Arena; Attendance: 250
	Penalties
	Perovuo (penalty scored); Jean Carlo (penalty scored); Uimaniemi (penalty missed); Weckström (penalty scored); Ivanov (penalty scored); Jouini (penalty scored); Otaru (penalty scored)		Virtanen (penalty scored); Rähmönen (penalty missed); Sjöroos (penalty scored); Hyyrynen (penalty scored); Mettälä (penalty scored); Kinnunen (penalty scored); Friberg (penalty missed)

24 March 2016	JJK	4–1	JIPPO	Jyväskylä
18:30 (EET)	Itkonen 11'; Markkula 24' (pen.); Abahassine 41', 48'	Report	Makkonen 26'	Stadium: Vehkalampi; Attendance: 110; Referee: Ville Nevalainen

26 March 2016	PK-35 Vantaa	2–1 (a.e.t.)	HIFK	Vantaa
13:00 (EET)	Couñago 45'; Kaufmann 114'	Report	Jurvainen 9'	Stadium: Myyrmäki Stadion; Attendance: 650

26 March 2016	Legirus Inter	1–3 (a.e.t.)	IFK Mariehamn	Vantaa
15:00 (EET)	Chidi 59'	Report	Sid 90+6'; Kangaskolkka 105' da Cruz 119'	Stadium: Kalmuuri TN; Attendance: 289

29 March 2016	Hercules	0–8	RoPS	Oulu
18:30 (EEST)		Report	Taylor 5'; Kokko 11', 13', 29'; John 58'; Jammeh 74'; Nganbe 80'; Heikkilä 85'	Stadium: Heinäpään jalkapallohalli Attendance: 350

30 March 2016	Lahti Akatemia	2–4 (a.e.t.)	JäPS	Lahti
18:30 (EEST)	Saastamoinen 40'; Salimäki 99'	Report	Norring 86'; Lähde 111'; Tuuliainen 113', 120'	Stadium: Vierumäki TN; Attendance: 87

1 April 2016	FC Haka	0–0 (a.e.t.) (5–4 p)	FC Ilves	Valkeakoski
18:00 (EEST)		Report		Stadium: Tehtaan kenttä Attendance: 1,163; Referee: Dennis Antamo
	Penalties
	James (penalty scored); Mäenpää (penalty scored); Popovitch (penalty missed); Tabe (penalty scored); Mbachu (penalty scored); Intala (penalty scored)		Reuben (penalty missed); Hynynen (penalty scored); Ala-Myllymäki (penalty scored); Korte (penalty scored); Lahtinen (penalty scored); Hilska (penalty missed)

1 April 2016	Atletico Malmi	0–6	FC Lahti	Helsinki
20:00 (EEST)		Report	Paananen 9'; Hauhia 22'; Shala 32'; Tuominen 34'; Multanen 70'; Kuningas 87'	Stadium: Oulunkylä TN; Attendance: 456

2 April 2016	FC Jazz	2–1	Närpes Kraft	Pori
13:15 (EEST)	Lehtonen 32'; Välilä 74'	Report	Sanchez 8'	Stadium: Pori Urheilukeskus TN; Attendance: 153

2 April 2016	MuSa	0–5	KPV	Pori
16:00 (EEST)		Report	Myntti 10'; Banner 19'; Tshibasu 55'; Ceesay 68'; Palosaari 81'	Stadium: Pori Urheilukeskus TN; Attendance: 187

5 April 2016	PS Kemi	1–1 (a.e.t.) (4–5 p)	SJK	Kemi
17:00 (EEST)	Ions 116'	Report	Riski 118'	Stadium: CitySport Areena TN; Attendance: 401
	Penalties
	Jovović (penalty scored); Eissele (penalty scored); Räihä (penalty scored); Ions (penalty scored); Veteli (penalty missed); Turpeenniemi (penalty missed)		Eremenko (penalty scored); Riski (penalty scored); Aalto (penalty scored); Klinga (penalty scored); Laaksonen (penalty missed); Rahimi (penalty scored)

5 April 2016	TPV	2–3 (a.e.t.)	KuPS	Tampere
19:00 (EEST)	Korsunov 28'; Näykki 77'	Report	Rannankari 55'; Hakola 87'; Savolainen 105'	Stadium: Pyynikki; Attendance: 539

== Sixth round ==
16 teams played in the sixth round.

19 April 2016	JJK	2–2 (a.e.t.) (1–3 p)	FC Jazz	Jyväskylä
17:00 (EEST)	Tapaninen 62'; Suoraniemi 71'	Report	Riihimäki 78'; Nurminen 90+1'	Stadium: Viitaniemi; Attendance: 355
	Penalties
	Tapaninen (penalty missed); Leppänen (penalty scored); Järvinen (penalty missed); Kohonen (penalty missed)		Riihimäki (penalty missed); Leskelä (penalty scored); Sánchez (penalty scored); Mäkelä (penalty scored)

19 April 2016	KPV	1–2 (a.e.t.)	Honka	Kokkola
17:30 (EEST)	Myllymäki 48'	Report	Huhtala 90+6', 102'	Stadium: Santahaka; Attendance: 419

20 April 2016	FC Haka	4–1	RoPS	Valkeakoski
17:30 (EEST)	Ahonen 41'; Järvi 70', 75'; Dudu 84'	Report	Kokko 66'	Stadium: Tehtaan kenttä Attendance: 788

21 April 2016	VPS	1–2	SJK	Vaasa
18:15 (EEST)	Hertsi 36'	Report	Ngueukam 26', 58'	Stadium: Botniahalli

21 April 2016	AC Kajaani	1–5 (a.e.t.)	HJK	Kajaani
18:30 (EEST)	Ibiyomi 79'	Report	Morelos 71', 116'; Väisänen 94'; Ylätupa 111'; Forssell 114' (pen.)	Stadium: Kajaanin liikuntapuisto Attendance: 1,172

21 April 2016	IFK Mariehamn	1–2 (a.e.t.)	FC Lahti	Mariehamn
18:30 (EEST)	Orgill 15'	Report	Multanen 32'; Hostikka 102'	Stadium: Wiklöf Holding Arena; Attendance: 840

21 April 2016	Inter Turku	0–4	PK-35 Vantaa	Turku
18:30 (EEST)		Report	Ömer 7', 32'; Mateo 16'; Couñago 70'	Stadium: Veritas Stadion; Attendance: 645

21 April 2016	JäPS	0–1	KuPS	Järvenpää
18:30 (EEST)		Report	Savolainen 80'	Stadium: Koivusaari TN; Attendance: 750

== Quarter-finals ==
15 June 2016	FC Haka	2–1	Honka	Valkeakoski
18:30 (EEST)	Rantanen 33'; Järvi 58'	Report	Jean Carlo 76'	Stadium: Tehtaan kenttä Attendance: 992

15 June 2016	FC Jazz	0–1	FC Lahti	Pori
18:30 (EEST)		Report	Sadat 82'	Stadium: Pori Stadion; Attendance: 881

15 June 2016	PK-35 Vantaa	1–3	SJK	Vantaa
18:30 (EEST)	Kuqi 21'	Report	Penninkangas 17'; Riski 24'; Ngueukam 90'	Stadium: Myyrmäki Stadion; Attendance: 689

15 June 2016	KuPS	1–4	HJK	Kuopio
18:30 (EEST)	Salami 78'	Report	Kolehmainen 40'; Morelos 53', 73', 85' (pen.)	Stadium: Väinölänniemi; Attendance: 3,673

== Semi-finals ==
23 June 2016	FC Haka	1–6	SJK	Valkeakoski
18:30 (EEST)	Dudu 67'	Report	Tahvanainen 13'; Ngueukam 26'; Riski 33'; Hradecky 54'; Rahimi 75'; Klinga 88'	Stadium: Tehtaan kenttä Attendance: 1,265; Referee: Antti Munukka

23 June 2016	FC Lahti	0–3	HJK	Lahti
18:30 (EEST)		Report	Morelos 33'; Malolo 62'; Tanaka 79'	Stadium: Lahti Stadium; Attendance: 1,238; Referee: Ville Nevalainen

== Final ==
24 September 2016	SJK	1–1 (a.e.t.) (7–6 p)	HJK	Tampere
15:30 (EEST)	Riski 74'	Report	Morelos 49'	Stadium: Ratina Stadium; Attendance: 2,000; Referee: Jari Järvinen
	Penalties
	Lehtinen (penalty scored); Vales (penalty scored); Hurme (penalty scored); Aimar (penalty missed); Laaksonen (penalty scored); Tuco (penalty scored); Penninkangas (penalty scored); Hetemaj (penalty scored)		(penalty scored) Forssell; (penalty scored) Pelvas; (penalty scored) Morelos; (penalty scored) Rafinha; (penalty missed) Tatomirović; (penalty scored) Dahlström; (penalty scored) Annan; (penalty missed) Jalasto

== Scorers ==
As of match played 21 April 2016

7 goals:

- (Finland) Juho Patola - P-Iirot

6 goals:

- (Colombia) Alfredo Morelos - HJK
- (Finland) Jussi Länsimaa - HJS Academy

5 goals:

- (Nigeria) Michael Ibiyomi - AC Kajaani

4 goals:

- (Finland) Aleksi Hollmen - EPS
- (Finland) Mikko Jalonen - EPS
- (Finland) Karim Jouini - Honka
- (Finland) Didis Lutumba-Pitah - Honka Academy
- (Finland) Jasin Abahassine - JJK
- (Finland) Maales Lombo - Kiisto
- (Finland) Robin Saastamoinen - Lahti Akatemia
- (Finland) Petteri Heikkilä - Legirus Inter
- (Finland) Pietari Palomäki - RiPS
- (Finland) Aleksandr Kokko - RoPS
- (Cameroon) Ariel Ngueukam - SJK

3 goals:

- (Finland) Jesse Ketonen - Atletico Malmi
- (Finland) Eero Forsen - Gnistan/Ogeli
- (Finland) Topi Järvi - Haka
- (Finland) Otto-Pekka Jurvainen - HIFK
- (Finland) Anton Londono - Honka Academy
- (Finland) Niklas Blomqvist - HooGee/2 / TPS
- (Finland) Niko Ruotsalainen - Kasiysi Rocky
- (Finland) Marko Hyvönen - Lahti Akatemia
- (Spain) Nando Cózar - Legirus Inter
- (Argentina) Agus Ojeda - Legirus Inter
- (Nigeria) Samuel Chidi - Legirus Inter
- (Finland) Mikko Ruokonen - LoPa
- (Finland) Joni Murtomaa - NJS
- (Finland) Julie Joakim - NuPS
- (Finland) Lanne Ossian - NuPS
- (Finland) Jari Koivulahti - NuPS
- (England) Billy Ions - PS Kemi
- (Finland) Roope Riski - SJK

2 goals:

- (Finland) Ali Hajizadeh - AC Kajaani
- (Finland) Jukka Haarala - Atletico Malmi
- (Finland) Matias Pitkänen - Gnistan/Ogeli
- (Finland) Marko Selin - Gnistan/Ogeli
- (Finland) Joni Mäkelä - Haka
- (Nigeria) Dudu Omagbemi - Haka
- (Finland) Joni Kivelä - Harjun Potku
- (Finland) Jonni Thusberg - Härmä
- (Finland) Joni Korhonen - HIFK
- (Finland) Ville Jalasto - HJK
- (Finland) Mikael Forssell - HJK
- (Finland) Juuso Huhtapelto - HJS Academy
- (Finland) Onni Puhalainen - Honka Academy
- (Finland) Toni Maarno - Honka Academy
- (Finland) Rony Huhtala - Honka
- (Finland) Antto Hilska - Ilves
- (Finland) Solomon Duah - Inter Turku
- (Finland) Benjamin Källman - Inter Turku
- (Finland) Jukka Suhonen - JanPa
- (Finland) Osku Partonen - JäPS
- (Finland) Joni Norring - JäPS
- (Finland) Juho Tuuliainen - JäPS
- (Finland) Jussi Välilä - Jazz
- (Finland) Waltteri Riihimäki - Jazz
- (Finland) Nico Särkiniemi - JBK
- (Finland) Joakim Häggblom - JBK
- (Finland) Eetu Koistinen - JIPPO
- (Finland) Elias Tolvanen - JIPPO
- (Finland) Hans Ekroos - JoPS
- (Finland) Aleksander Akbar - KäPa
- (Finland) Markus Tukiainen - Kontu
- (Finland) Jari Lappalainen - Korso United
- (Finland) Eero Johansson - Korso United
- (Finland) Kim Palosaari - KPV
- (Finland) Isaac Inkilä - KUMU Edustus
- (Finland) Saku Savolainen - KuPS
- (Finland) Kalle Multanen - Lahti
- (Finland) Jegor Pauk - Legirus Inter
- (Tanzania) Zakaria Kibona - Legirus Inter
- (Finland) Eino Kilpeläinen - NJS
- (Finland) Viktor Limnell - NuPS
- (Finland) Ilkka Pyyhtiä - NuPS
- (Finland) Mikael Lundsten - NuPS
- (Finland) Niklas Kuusio - P-Iirot
- (Finland) Joonas Ojanen - P-Iirot
- (Finland) Mikko Valtanen - P-Iirot
- (Finland) Oso Syväoja - PEF
- (Finland) Elmeri Oksanen - PEKA
- (Finland) Tomi Räikkönen - Peltirumpu
- (Brazil) Lucas Kaufmann - PK-35 Vantaa
- (Finland) Masar Ömer - PK-35 Vantaa
- (Finland) Riku Eskolin - RiPS
- (Finland) Levi Saikkonen - RiPS
- (Finland) Jani Masalin - SC Wolves
- (Finland) Jyri Brunou - SibboV
- (Finland) Mikael Muurimäki - SJK-j Apollo
- (Finland) Ali Koljonen - Tampere United
- (Finland) Lauri Saari - Tampere United
- (Finland) Mikko Viitajylhä - Tervarit-j/JuPa
- (Finland) Samuli Leppänen - Töölön Vesa
- (Finland) Oliver Reitala - ToTe
- (Finland) Jani Tapani Virtanen - TPS

1 goals:

- (Finland) Timo Heikkinen - AC Kajaani
- (Latvia) Edijs Joksts - AC Kajaani
- (Spain) Jordi Lahnalakso - AC Kajaani
- (Finland) Rezgar Amani - Åland
- (Finland) Mikko Huupponen - Atletico Malmi
- (Finland) Jonne Ketonen - Atletico Malmi
- (Finland) Henri Mattsson - Atletico Malmi
- (Finland) Akan Okomoh - Atletico Malmi
- (Finland) Antti Säynätkari - Atletico Malmi
- (Finland) Mika Tenkanen - Atletico Malmi
- (Finland) Soran Enayati - Aztecas
- (Finland) Pontus Lindroos - Boda
- (Finland) Philip Enckell - CLE
- (Finland) Juuso Palmroos - EPS
- (Finland) Ali Barkat - EPS
- (Finland) Matti Pirhonen - EsPa
- (Finland) Pyry-Ville Korhonen - EsPa
- (The Gambia) Modou Ngum - EsPa
- (Sweden) David Carlsson - GBK
- (Finland) Joonas Tuomi - Gnistan/Ogeli
- (Finland) Tuukka Laitinen - Gnistan/Ogeli
- (Finland) Esko Häyrynen - Gnistan 2
- (Finland) Rami Murto - Gnistan 2
- (South Africa) Cheyne Fowler - Haka
- (Finland) Niilo Mäenpää - Haka
- (Finland) Jere Intala - Haka
- (Nigeria) Emenike Mbachu - Haka
- (Finland) Jesse Ahonen - Haka
- (Finland) Jaakko Rantanen - Haka
- (Finland) Atte Ekholm - Härmä
- (Finland) Juuso Lindroos - Härmä
- (Finland) Tatu Mäkelä - Härmä
- (Finland) Ersin Ramadani - Härmä
- (Finland) Eero Peltonen - HIFK
- (Finland) Ville Salmikivi - HIFK
- (Finland) Jukka Aakko - HIFK/4
- (Finland) Obed Malolo - HJK
- (Finland) Leo Väisänen - HJK
- (Finland) Saku Ylätupa - HJK
- (Finland) Toni Kolehmainen - HJK
- (Japan) Atomu Tanaka - HJK
- (Finland) Markus Grönlund - HJK/Lsalo
- (Finland) Jere Suomalainen - HJS Academy
- (Brazil) Filipe Mello - Honka
- (Finland) Calvin N'Sombo - Honka
- (Finland) Joel Perovuo - Honka
- (Finland) Nicholas Otaru - Honka
- (Finland) John Weckström - Honka
- (Brazil) Jean Carlo - Honka
- (Finland) Jonne Innala - Honka Academy
- (Finland) Aleksi Jokela - Honka Academy
- (Finland) Konsta Karppinen - Honka Academy
- (Finland) Sebastian Lindfors - Honka Academy
- (Finland) Eero Hirvonen - Honka Academy
- (Finland) Kasperi Nieminen - Honka Academy
- (Finland) Adam Yassin - Honka Academy
- (Finland) Simo Räsänen - Honka Academy
- (Finland) Efe Pehlivan - Honka Academy
- (Finland) Robert Lindfors - HooGee
- (Finland) Mikael Huttunen - HooGee
- (Finland) Tim Basili - HPS
- (Finland) Joonas Lehtinen - I-HK
- (Finland) Mikko Maaranen - I-HK
- (Finland) Tony Tallqvist - I-HK
- (Finland) Robin Sid - IFK Mariehamn
- (Jamaica) Dever Orgill - IFK Mariehamn
- (Finland) Aleksei Kangaskolkka - IFK Mariehamn
- (Sweden) Bobbie Friberg da Cruz - IFK Mariehamn
- (Finland) Topias Järvelä - Ilves 2
- (Finland) Jussi Nummela - Ilves 2
- (Finland) Konsta Raittinen - Ilves 2
- (France) Guy Gnabouyou - Inter Turku
- (Finland) Juho Salminen - Inter Turku
- (Finland) Felix Nykopp - HooGee
- (Finland) Sergei Eremenko - Jaro
- (United States) Josue Soto - Jaro
- (Mexico) Alberto Alvarado Morín - Jaro
- (Finland) Matias Koskinen - Jazz
- (Finland) Juho Lehtonen - Jazz
- (Finland) Aleksi Nurminen - Jazz
- (Finland) Joni Remesaho - JBK
- (Finland) Singh Sumit - JBK
- (Finland) Kristoffer Knuts - JBK
- (Finland) Viktor Strömbäck - JBK
- (Finland) Tommi Miettinen - JFC
- (Finland) Johannes Mononen - JIPPO
- (Finland) Antti Kuosmanen - JIPPO
- (Finland) Miika Vainikainen - JIPPO
- (Finland) Teemu Hallikainen - JIPPO
- (Finland) Topi Sormunen - JIPPO
- (Finland) Joona Pussinen - JIPPO
- (Finland) Aapo Makkonen - JIPPO
- (Finland) Mikko Ala-Porkkunen - JJK
- (Finland) Topias Tammelin - JJK
- (Finland) Iiro Järvinen - JJK
- (Finland) Matti Lähitie - JJK
- (Finland) Mikko Manninen - JJK
- (Finland) Toni Tahvanainen - JJK
- (Finland) Joona Itkonen - JJK
- (Finland) Niko Markkula - JJK
- (Finland) Antto Tapaninen - JJK
- (Finland) Samu Suoraniemi - JJK
- (Finland) Jarno Ruisniemi - JoPS
- (Finland) Tuomas Kortelainen - JoPS
- (Nigeria) Jerome Ogbuefi - JS Hercules
- (Finland) Arttu Haapala - JS Hercules
- (Finland) Sampsa Mäkinen - KäPa
- (Finland) Tommi Tainio - KäPa
- (Finland) Antti Arvola - Kasiysi Rocky
- (Finland) Jani Sundström - KelA
- (Finland) Ahmadi Ruin - Kiisto
- (Finland) Conny Nyman - Kiisto
- (Finland) Mikko Joensuu - Kiisto
- (Finland) Simo Miettinen - Kontu
- (Finland) Teemu Ilola - Kontu
- (Finland) Evgeni Tolppa - Kontu
- (Finland) Arto Kuoremäki - Korso United
- (Finland) Samuli Hopia - Korso United
- (Finland) Riku Savolainen - Korso United
- (Finland) Aleksi Hämäläinen - KPS
- (Finland) Joni Kivinen - KPS
- (Finland) Ville Luokkala - KPV
- (Georgia (country)) Irakli Sirbiladze - KPV
- (Finland) Henri Myntti - KPV
- (United States) Mike Banner - KPV
- (Belgium) Washilly Tshibasu - KPV
- (The Gambia) Yankuba Ceesay - KPV
- (Finland) Joonas Myllymäki - KPV
- (Finland) Niko Ikävalko - KTP
- (Finland) Milo Behm - KUMU Edustus
- (Finland) Iisak Inkilä - KUMU Edustus
- (Finland) Jere Mäkinen - KUMU Edustus
- (Finland) Mikko Piirala - KUMU Edustus
- (Finland) Tomi Räsänen - Kuopion Elo
- (Finland) Pekka Pentikäinen - Kuopion Elo
- (Finland) Patrik Alaharjula - KuPS
- (Finland) Jani Mahanen - KuPS
- (Nigeria) Azubuike Egwuekwe - KuPS
- (Finland) Tuomas Rannankari - KuPS
- (Finland) Juha Hakola - KuPS
- (Nigeria) Gbolahan Salami - KuPS
- (Finland) Aleksi Paananen - Lahti
- (Finland) Mikko Hauhia - Lahti
- (Finland) Drilon Shala - Lahti
- (Finland) Jasse Tuominen - Lahti
- (Finland) Mikko Kuningas - Lahti
- (Finland) Santeri Hostikka - Lahti
- (Afghanistan) Fareed Sadat - Lahti
- (Finland) Jens Tanskanen - Lahti Akatemia
- (Finland) Burhan Sadik - Lahti Akatemia
- (Finland) Onuray Köse - Lahti Akatemia
- (Finland) Samuel Mahlamäki Camacho - Lahti Akatemia
- (Finland) Mikael Salimäki - Lahti Akatemia
- (Finland) Topias Hänninen - LPS
- (Finland) Riku-Pekka Huhanantti - LPS
- (Finland) Topi Rihtniemi - LPS
- (Finland) Samuli Laitila - LPS
- (Finland) Saman Safiyari - Legirus Inter
- (Spain) Manel Subirats - Legirus Inter
- (Finland) Mikko Halonen - Legirus Inter
- (Finland) Santeri Harja - LoPa
- (Finland) Miika Talvasto - LoPa
- (Finland) Joonas Vuorela - LoPa
- (Finland) Niko Vainionpää - MuSa
- (Finland) Miika-Samuel Rostedt - MuSa
- (Finland) Juuso Havia - MynPa
- (Finland) Tom Termaat - MynPa
- (Finland) Joonas Kivilä - MynPa
- (Finland) Miikka Sainio - MynPa
- (Finland) Šemsudin Mujkić - Närpes Kraft
- (Finland) Jonas Granfors - Närpes Kraft
- (United States) Jossimar Sanchez - Närpes Kraft
- (Finland) Joonas Järvenpää - NJS
- (Finland) Nikke Jussila - NJS/2
- (Finland) Pol Deng - OTP
- (Finland) Josey Dziadulewicz - OTP
- (Finland) Rony Knape - OTP
- (Finland) Ville Vanhatalo - FC Pato
- (Finland) Miika Pertola - P-Iirot
- (Romania) Vasile Marchiș - P-Iirot
- (Finland) Niko Ahola - PEF
- (Finland) Mikko Hyötylä - PEF
- (Finland) Salmio Salonico - Peimari UTD
- (Finland) Juho Nykänen - PEKA
- (Finland) Jani Liski - PEKA
- (Finland) Arame Mudahemuka - PEKA
- (Finland) Toni Raanti - PEKA
- (Finland) Ferdi Balkiran - PEKA
- (Finland) Jommi Pätäri - Pelikaani
- (Finland) Marcus Heimonen - PK-35 Vantaa
- (Spain) Mateo - PK-35 Vantaa
- (Spain) Pablo Couñago - PK-35 Vantaa
- (Spain) Yerai Couñago - PK-35 Vantaa
- (Finland) Njazi Kuqi - PK-35 Vantaa
- (Finland) Samuel Olander - PKKU
- (Finland) Joona Kemppainen - PPJ
- (Finland) Kimmo Koivisto - PPJ
- (Serbia) Saša Jovović - PS Kemi
- (Finland) Hertell Valtteri - RiPS
- (Finland) Joni Parjanen - RiPS
- (Finland) Robert Taylor - RoPS
- (United States) Will John - RoPS
- (The Gambia) Abdou Jammeh - RoPS
- (Cameroon) Jean Fridolin Nganbe - RoPS
- (Finland) Aapo Heikkilä - RoPS
- (Finland) Riku Välikangas - Sääripotku
- (Finland) Henry Söderlund - SIF
- (Finland) Thomas Karv - SIF
- (Finland) Matej Hradecky - SJK
- (Finland) Matti Klinga - SJK
- (Finland) Teemu Penninkangas - SJK
- (Finland) Youness Rahimi - SJK
- (Finland) Timo Tahvanainen - SJK
- (Finland) Tuomas Nikupeteri - SJK-j Apollo
- (Finland) Klaus Nevalainen - SC Riverball
- (Finland) Eero Naakka - SC Riverball
- (Finland) Joel Hilden - SC Wolves
- (Finland) Jiri Vainio - SC Wolves
- (Finland) Pavel Tiusanen - SUMU/Sob
- (Finland) Soje Efe Bright - SUMU-77
- (Finland) Tuomas Lehti - Tampere United
- (Finland) Tuomas Alanen - Tampere United
- (Finland) Lauri Lilleberg - Tervarit-j/JuPa
- (Finland) Janne Komulainen - Tervarit-j/JuPa
- (Finland) Jonni Rahko - Töölön Vesa
- (Finland) Atte Malmström - Töölön Vesa
- (Finland) Akseli Lehtonen - ToTe
- (Finland) Ville Komu - ToTe
- (Finland) Felix Lindfors - ToTe
- (Finland) Riku Sjöroos - TPS
- (Finland) Sami Rähmönen - TPS
- (Finland) Ilari Mettälä - TPS
- (Finland) Mikko Hyyrynen - TPS
- (Finland) Timo Lekkermäki - TP-T
- (Finland) Lari Hakanen - TP-T
- (Finland) Niko Kiiveri - TPV
- (Finland) Sergei Korsunov - TPV
- (Finland) Paavo Näykki - TPV
- (Finland) Jani Nygård - TuPS
- (Finland) Markus Närhi - TuPS
- (Finland) Joonas Vahtera - VPS
- (Finland) Eero Tamminen - VPS
- (Finland) Loorents Hertsi - VPS

Own goals:

- (Finland) LehPa -77 (28 January 2016 vs Kuopion Elo)
- (Finland) Jommi Pätäri Pelikaani (6 February 2016 vs Korso United)
- (Finland) TuPS (28 January 2016 vs Legirus Inter)
- (Finland) TuPS (28 January 2016 vs Legirus Inter)
