= Henri Aalto =

Finnish footballer (born 1989)

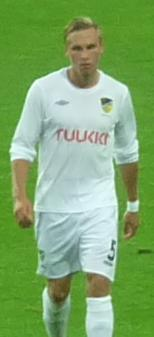

Personal information
- Date of birth: 20 April 1989 (age 37)
- Place of birth: Espoo, Finland
- Height: 1.84 m (6 ft 0 in)
- Position: Defender

Youth career
- HooGee
- 2001–2007: Honka

Senior career*
Years	Team	Apps	(Gls)
2006–2014	Honka	143	(8)
2008	→ GrIFK (loan)	10	(0)
2008–2011	→ Pallohonka	22	(8)
2015–2016	SJK	44	(0)
2017–2018	VfB Oldenburg	32	(1)
2018–2023	Honka	109	(3)
Total		360	(20)

International career
2008	Finland U19	5	(0)
2008	Finland U20	1	(0)
2009	Finland U21	8	(0)
Medal record
Honka
Second place	Finnish Cup	2008
Second place	Veikkausliiga	2008
Second place	Veikkausliiga	2009
First place	Finnish League Cup	2010
First place	Finnish League Cup	2011
First place	Finnish Cup	2012
Second place	Veikkausliiga	2013
SJK
First place	Veikkausliiga	2015
Second place	Finnish League Cup	2016
First place	Finnish Cup	2016
Third place	Veikkausliiga	2016
Second place	Finnish Cup	2017
- * Club domestic league appearances and goals as of 3 April 2023

Henri Aalto (born 20 April 1989) is a Finnish former professional footballer who last played as a defender for Finnish Veikkausliiga club Honka. He began his senior club career playing for Honka and made his league debut at age 19 in 2008. He helped Honka win two successive League Cup titles and the Finnish Cup.

== Club career ==
=== Honka ===
Aalto was born in Espoo, Finland, raised in Honka's youth ranks, he made his first team debut on 27 April 2008, at the age of 19, in a match against MYPA. He represented Honka for eight seasons in 140 league matches in which he scored 8 goals.

=== SJK ===
On 15 March 2015, it was announced that Aalto had signed a contract with SJK. Aalto made his league debut for the club on 19 April 2015, playing all ninety minutes of a 1–0 home victory over RoPS. He spent the 2015 and 2016 Veikkausliiga seasons with the club.

=== VfB Oldenburg ===
In the winter of 2017 Aalto signed a contract with VfB Oldenburg, in the German Regionalliga. Aalto made his competitive debut for the club on 5 February 2017 in a 3–3 draw in the league with Lupo Martini. He scored his first league goal for the club exactly two weeks after he made his debut, with it coming in the 34th minute of a 2–1 league defeat to Weiche Flensburg. He would go on to make 32 league appearances for the club, scoring 1 goal.

=== Return to Honka ===
In July 2018 it was announced that Aalto would return to Honka.

On 19 October 2023, it was announced that Aalton would retire after the end of the 2023 season. He won several honours during his time with the club.

== International career ==
Aalto has capped 14 matches for various Finland youth teams. He made his debut for the Finland U21 in a match against Estonia U21 on Esport Arena on 11 February 2009 when he replaced Jussi Heikkinen for the second period of the match.

== Career statistics ==
=== Club ===
As of 18 May 2019

Appearances and goals by club, season and competition
Club	Season	League			National Cups (Note: Includes Finnish Cup, Finnish League Cup and DFB-Pokal)		Europe		Total	
Club	Season	Division	Apps	Goals	Apps	Goals	Apps	Goals	Apps	Goals
Honka	2008	Veikkausliiga	5	0	0	0	1 (Note: Appearances in the UEFA Europa League)	0	6	0
Honka	2009	Veikkausliiga	13	0	7	0	3	0	23	0
Honka	2010	Veikkausliiga	9	1	1	0	1	0	11	1
Honka	2011	Veikkausliiga	26	2	5	0	4	0	35	2
Honka	2012	Veikkausliiga	30	4	11	0	—		41	4
Honka	2013	Veikkausliiga	25	1	5	1	2	0	32	2
Honka	2014	Veikkausliiga	32	0	2	0	2	0	36	0
Honka	Total		140	8	31	1	13	0	184	9
GrIFK (loan)	2008	Ykkönen	10	0	0	0	—		10	0
SJK	2015	Veikkausliiga	21	0	1	0	1	0	23	0
SJK	2016	Veikkausliiga	23	0	4	0	2 (Note: Appearances in the UEFA Champions League)	0	29	0
SJK	Total		44	0	5	0	3	0	52	0
SJK Akatemia	2015	Kakkonen	1	0	–		–		1	0
Oldenburg	2016–17	Regionalliga Nord	12	1	0	0	—		12	1
Oldenburg	2017–18	Regionalliga Nord	20	0	2	0	—		22	0
Oldenburg	Total		32	1	2	0	0	0	33	2
Honka	2018	Veikkausliiga	12	0	0	0	—		12	0
Honka	2019	Veikkausliiga	23	2	7	0	—		30	0
Honka	2020	Veikkausliiga	14	0	6	0	1	0	20	0
Honka	2021	Veikkausliiga	23	0	0	0	4 (Note: Appearances in UEFA Conference League)	0	27	0
Honka	2022	Veikkausliiga	21	1	7	1	–		28	2
Honka	2023	Veikkausliiga	16	0	4	0	0	0	20	0
Honka	Total		109	3	24	1	5	0	138	4
Career total			336	12	77	2	21	0	434	14

== Honours and achievements ==
Honka

- Finnish League Cup: 2010, 2011, 2022
- Finnish Cup: 2012

SJK

- Veikkausliiga: 2015
- Finnish Cup: 2016
- Finnish Cup runner-up: 2023

Individual

- Veikkausliiga Team of the Year: 2018
