= Viik =

Family name

Viik is a surname of both Finnish and Estonian origin. Viik may refer to:

- Jaan Viik, Estonian Holocaust perpetrator
- Linnar Viik (born 1965). Estonian information technology scientist and entrepreneur
- Tommi Viik (born 1987), Finnish footballer
- Tõnu Viik (astronomer) (born 1939), Estonian astronomer
- Tõnu Viik (philosopher) (born 1968), Estonian philosopher
