= Hyyrynen =

Hyyrynen is a Finnish surname. Notable people with the surname include:

- Mikko Hyyrynen (born 1977), Finnish footballer
- Tuija Hyyrynen (born 1988), Finnish footballer
