= Mononen =

Mononen is a Finnish surname. Notable people with the surname include:

- Johannes Mononen (born 1991), Finnish footballer
- Kalevi Mononen (1920–1996), Finnish cross-country skier
- Lauri Mononen (1950–2018), Finnish ice hockey player
- Matti Mononen (born 1983), Finnish pole vaulter
- Unto Mononen (1930–1968), Finnish songwriter and musician
