= Kuosmanen =

Kuosmanen is a Finnish surname. Notable people with the surname include:

- Mirjami Kuosmanen (1915 – 1963), Finnish actress
- Antti Kuosmanen (born 1950), Finland's ambassador to the People's Republic of China
- Sakari Kuosmanen (born 1956), Finnish singer and actor
- Juho Kuosmanen (born 1979), Finnish film director and screenwriter
