= Eero Tamminen =

Finnish footballer (born 1995)

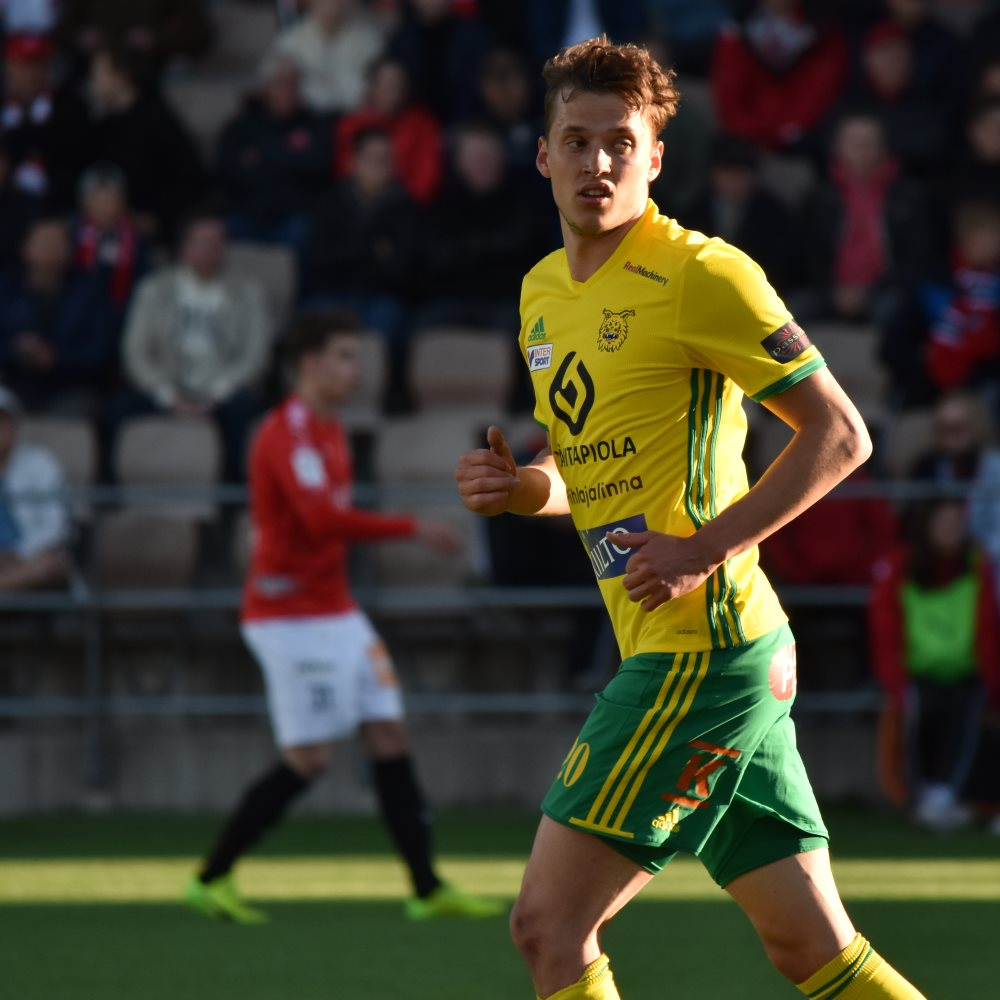
- Tamminen with Ilves in 2017

Personal information
- Date of birth: 19 May 1995 (age 31)
- Place of birth: Pihtipudas, Finland
- Height: 1.84 m (6 ft 0 in)
- Position: Winger

Team information
- Current team: Keuruun Pallo

Youth career
- –2014: JJK

Senior career*
Years	Team	Apps	(Gls)
2013	→ Hämeenlinnan Härmä (loan)	10	(1)
2014	→ SJK Akatemia (loan)	4	(0)
2014	TPS	25	(5)
2015–2016	VPS	42	(2)
2017–2018	Ilves	51	(6)
2019	Inter Turku	7	(0)
2019–2020	Ilves	17	(1)
2021–2022	IFK Mariehamn	30	(3)
2023	JäPS	16	(1)
2024	HuKi	7	(6)
2024	Kypärämäki Rangers	9	(7)
2025–	KeuPa	0	(0)

International career
2013	Finland U18	15	(5)
2014	Finland U19	2	(0)
2015–2016	Finland U21	6	(1)
- * Club domestic league appearances and goals as of 27 November 2023

Eero Tamminen (born 19 May 1995) is a Finnish professional footballer who plays as a winger for Keuruun Pallo.
