= Nando Cózar =

Spanish footballer

Personal information
- Full name: Fernando Cózar Torres
- Date of birth: 2 March 1991 (age 35)
- Place of birth: Cádiz, Spain
- Height: 1.88 m (6 ft 2 in)
- Position: Midfielder

Team information
- Current team: Lynx
- Number: 6

Youth career
- Cádiz

Senior career*
Years	Team	Apps	(Gls)
2010–2011	Cádiz B	15	(0)
2011–2012	Real Betis C		
2012	Conil	9	(0)
2013	Los Barrios	6	(0)
2012–2013	Chiclana CF	4	(1)
2013–2014	Xerez Deportivo	9	(0)
2014–2015	Los Barrios	33	(4)
2015–2017	Legirus Inter		
2017	KPV	9	(1)
2018–2019	HIFK	21	(4)
2019	Angkor Tiger FC		
2020	Øygarden FK		
2020	PEPO Lappeenranta	3	(0)
2020–2021	UD Lanzarote	5	(1)
2021–2022	Mons Calpe	21	(5)
2022–2023	Xerez CD	6	(0)
2023	St Joseph's	8	(0)
2023	Sambiase		
2023–2024	Jhapa	2	(0)
2025–	Lynx	14	(0)
- * Club domestic league appearances and goals as of 21 December 2025

Fernando "Nando" Cózar Torres (born 2 March 1991) is a Spanish professional footballer who plays as a midfielder for Gibraltar Football League side Lynx.

== Career ==
After failing to make an appearance for Spanish third division side Cádiz CF, Cózar played for UD Los Barrios, Chiclana CF, and Xerez Deportivo FC in the lower leagues. He joined Finnish fifth division club Legirus Inter. However, he left due to their financial problems and played for KPV and HIFK Fotboll, which he helped achieve promotion to the Finnish top flight, making two appearances there.

In 2019, Cózar signed for Angkor Tiger FC in Cambodia.

For the 2020 season, he signed for newly formed Øygarden FK but failed to make an appearance there.

In 2020, he returned to Finland with PEPO Lappeenranta.

In 2020, Cózar signed for Spanish fourth division outfit UD Lanzarote.
