= Zakaria Kibona =

Tanzanian football coach and former footballer (born 1990)

Personal information
- Date of birth: 14 March 1990 (age 36)
- Place of birth: Dar es Salaam, Tanzania
- Height: 1.80 m (5 ft 11 in)
- Position: Forward

Team information
- Current team: Espoo (manager)

Youth career
- –2006: Atlantis

Senior career*
Years	Team	Apps	(Gls)
2007–2009	Atlantis	49	(8)
2010	Klubi 04	13	(2)
2011	PK-35 Vantaa	23	(6)
2012	Mosta	3	(0)
2012	HIFK	7	(0)
2013	Viikingit	13	(3)
2014–15	BK-46	29	(10)
2016–2017	Legirus Inter	22	(30)
2017–19	Gnistan	38	(14)
2020	SexyPöxyt	4	(3)

Managerial career
- 2023–: Espoo
- 2024–: SexyPöxyt U19
- * Club domestic league appearances and goals as of 21 February 2024

Zakaria Kibona (born 14 March 1990) is a Finnish-Tanzanian football manager and a former player who played as a center-forward. He is currently working as a head coach of FC Espoo and SexyPöxyt U19 youth team.

== Playing career ==
Besides Finland, Kibona has played in Maltese Premier League for Mosta FC.

== Coaching career ==
Kibona has coached youth teams of IF Gnistan, FC Espoo and SexyPöxyt. In 2023, he was appointed a head coach of FC Espoo first team. In 2024, he started as a head coach of SexyPöxyt U19 team.

== Personal life ==
Born in Tanzania, Kibona moved to Finland at an early age. He holds a dual citizenship of Finland and Tanzania.
