= Tatu Mäkelä =

Finnish footballer (born 1988)

Personal information
- Date of birth: 14 June 1988 (age 38)
- Place of birth: Pori, Finland
- Position: Left-back

Youth career
- 1999–2005: MuSa

Senior career*
Years	Team	Apps	(Gls)
2005	MuSa	15	(1)
2006–2008	PoPa	18	(1)
2008	MuSa	21	(0)
2009–2012	Hämeenlinna	79	(2)
2010	→ FC Lahti (loan)	2	(0)
2013	Härmä	19	(3)
2014	JanPa	5	(2)
2014	Härmä	3	(1)

International career
2003	Finland U15	2	(0)
- * Club domestic league appearances and goals

Tatu Mäkelä (born 14 June 1988) is a Finnish former professional footballer who played as a left-back.
