= FC Sääripotku =

Finnish football club

- Full name: FC Sääripotku
- Founded: 2004
- Stadium: Ykspihlajan Urheilukenttä
- Chairman: Johan Prest
- Manager: Janne Björkgren
- League: Kolmonen
- 2025: Western Group C, 10th of 12

FC Sääripotku is a football club located in Kokkola, Finland. Founded in 2004, the club currently plays in the Finnish third division, Kolmonen.

== History ==
FC Sääripotku was founded in 2004 by the club chairman Johan Prest.

In 2026, the club was in danger of ceasing operations due to unpaid funds to the city of Kokkola for using the city's grounds.

== Colours and badge ==
FC Sääripotku's colours are orange and black.

== Stadium ==
FC Sääripotku plays their home matches on Ykspihlaja Sports Ground.

== Noted players ==
- (Finland) Tero Karhu (2016–2017, 2019)
