= Yankuba Ceesay =

Gambian footballer (born 1984)

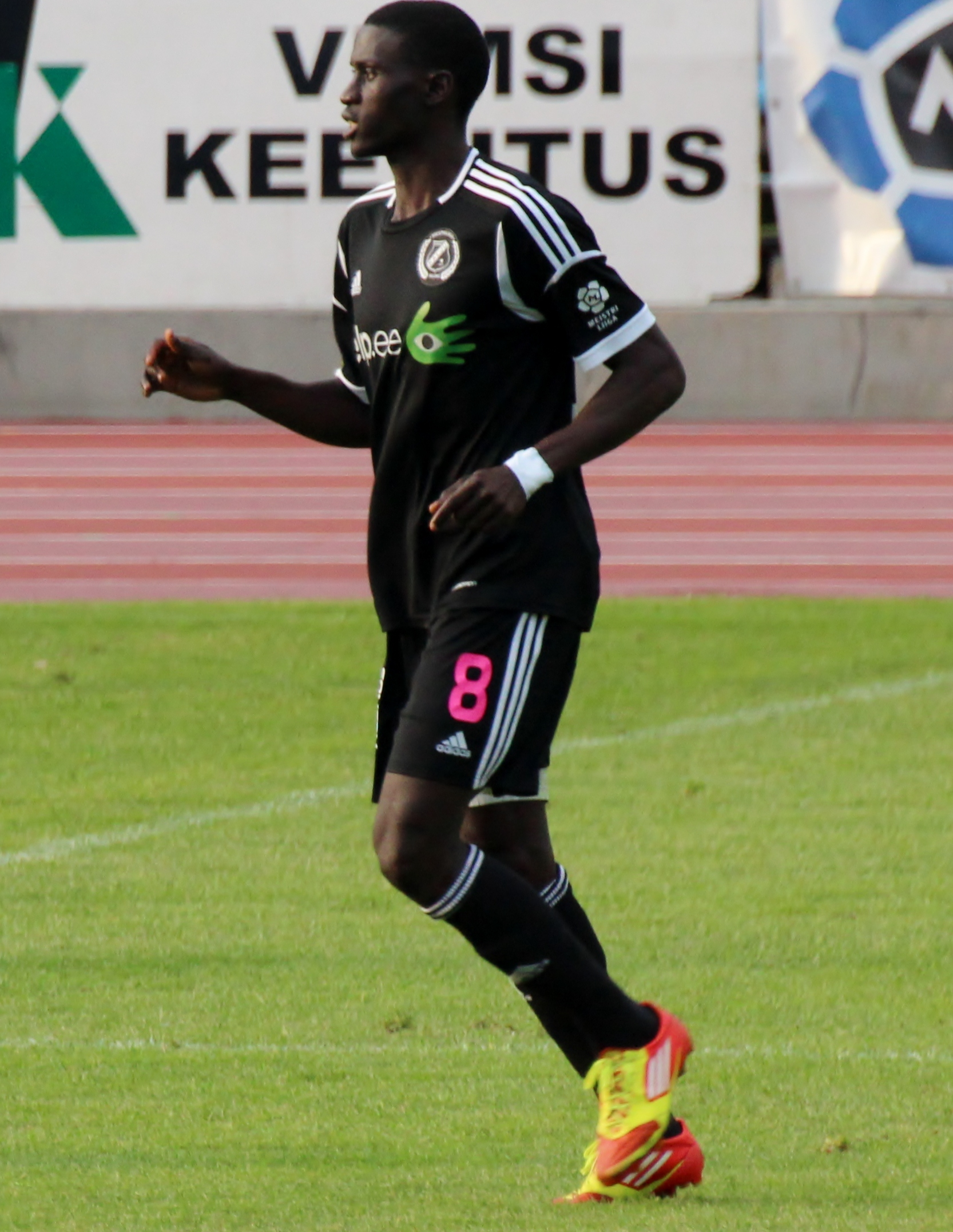
- Ceesay with Nõmme Kalju

Personal information
- Date of birth: 26 June 1984 (age 42)
- Place of birth: Serekunda, the Gambia
- Height: 1.83 m (6 ft 0 in)
- Position: Midfielder

Senior career*
Years	Team	Apps	(Gls)
2004–2006	Wallidan FC		
2007	Alianza Atlético	31	(3)
2008	Walsall	0	(0)
2008	ŁKS Łódź	0	(0)
2008–2010	Degerfors IF	15	(0)
2011	Jiul Petroşani	0	(0)
2010–2011	Trönö IK	7	(7)
2012–2013	Nõmme Kalju	37	(8)
2014	AC Kajaani	22	(0)
2015–2016	Kokkolan Palloveikot	36	(7)

International career
2007–2013	Gambia	6	(0)
- * Club domestic league appearances and goals

Yankuba Ceesay (born 26 June 1984), also known as Maal, is a Gambian football coach and former player A midfielder, he made seven appearances for the Gambia national team.

== Club career ==
When Ceesay joined Alianza Atlético of Peru, he became the first Gambian to play professional football in Latin America. He also had a brief trial with Walsall F.C. in January 2008. In 2008, he joined the Swedish club Degerfors IF, and for the first time he represented the Gambia national team in a match against Senegal.

On 7 March 2012, it was announced that he had signed a two-year contract with Estonian Meistriliiga side Nõmme Kalju. He made the league debut for the club on 10 March 2012, in a goalless draw against city rivals FC Levadia Tallinn. He had trials with Charlton Athletic and Leyton Orient in January 2013. On 23 July 2013, he scored Kalju's first ever goal in UEFA Champions League, an opening goal in a 2–1 win against Finnish side HJK. He left the club after the 2013 season, when his two-year contract ended.
