= Tuomas Rannankari =

Finnish footballer (born 1991)

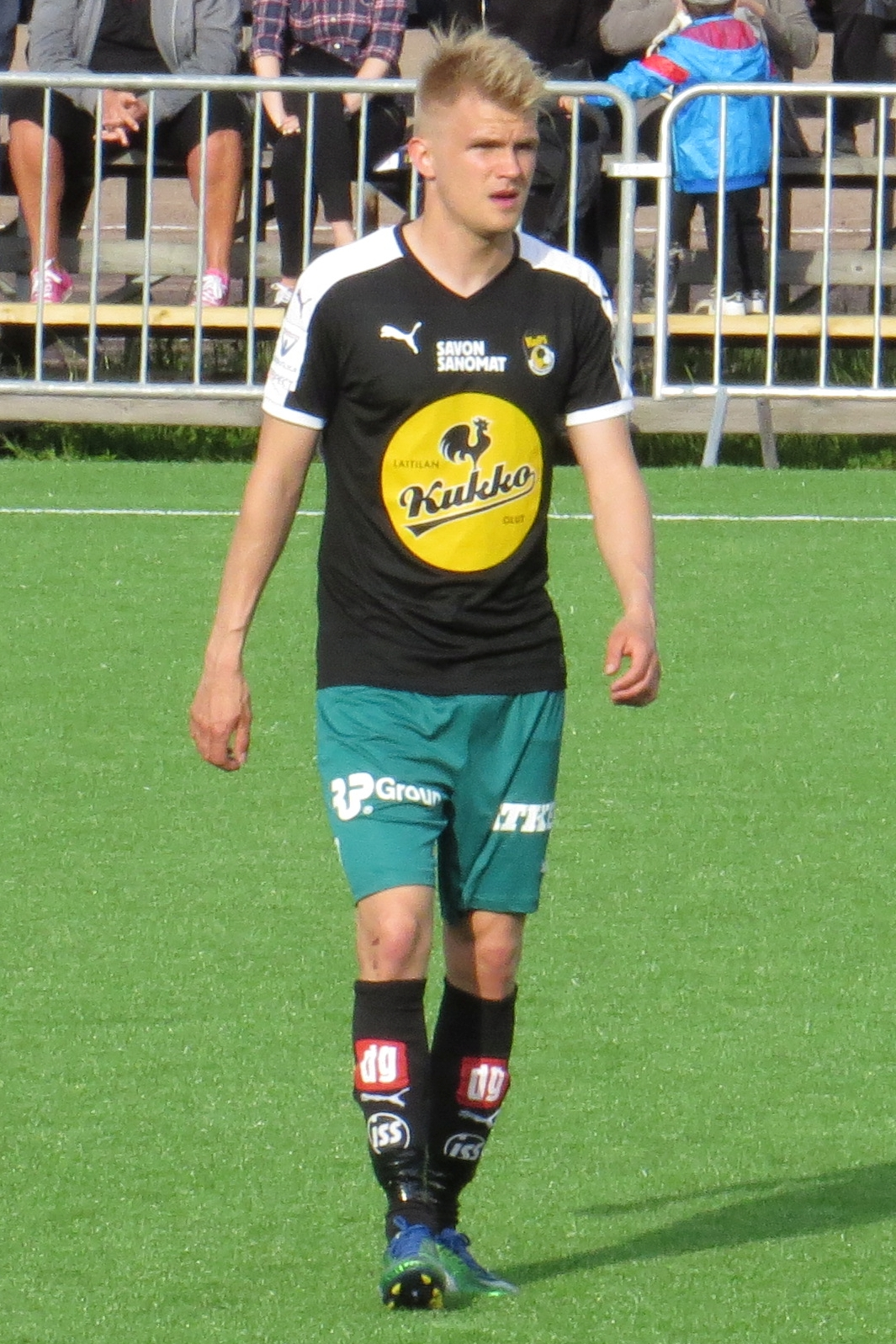
- With KuPS in 2015.

Personal information
- Date of birth: 21 May 1991 (age 35)
- Place of birth: Kuopio, Finland
- Height: 1.81 m (5 ft 11 1/2 in)
- Position: Left back

Youth career
- 2003–2008: KuPS

Senior career*
Years	Team	Apps	(Gls)
2008–2009	KuPS	13	(0)
2009–2012	Twente	0	(0)
2012–2013	Greuther Fürth II	31	(1)
2013–2017	KuPS	113	(1)
2018	Ilves	19	(0)

International career^{‡}
2009	Finland U-17	2	(0)
2008	Finland U-18	1	(0)
2010	Finland U-19	5	(0)
2011	Finland U-21	3	(0)
2012–2013	Finland	2	(0)
- * Club domestic league appearances and goals as of 20 January 2019 ‡ National team caps and goals as of 3 February 2013

Tuomas Rannankari (born 21 May 1991) is a Finnish former professional footballer who last played for Veikkausliiga club Ilves.

== Club career ==
Rannankari came through the youth system at KuPS. He made his first team debut in the 2009 season, during which he played 13 league games. He also played six games and scored his first goal in the Finnish League Cup in the same season.

On 22 June 2009, he was signed by FC Twente along with KuPS teammate Petteri Pennanen. A three-year contract was agreed. For the 2010–11 season, he was given squad number 42 but did not feature in any first team games.

In December 2011, he went on trial with Greenock Morton. In July 2012 he signed a contract for SpVgg Greuther Fürth U23 team which plays in Regionalliga (Fourth level). Rannankari played 31 matches and scored one goal but did not earn a place in Fürth's first team.

In July 2013, Rannankari went on trial with Plymouth Argyle.

After five seasons with KuPS in the Veikkausliiga, Rannankari signed a two-year contract with Ilves in November, 2017. He left the club at the end of 2018.

== International career ==
Rannankari has gained international recognition at under-17, under-19 and under-21 levels. He played his first game for the Finland under-21s in a 2–3 defeat against the Slovakia under-21s in a March 2011 friendly match.

Rannankari made his senior national team debut on 26 May 2012 in 3−2 victory against Turkey.

== Career statistics ==
As of 1 September 2024.

Appearances and goals by club, season and competition
Club	Season	League			Cup (Note: Includes Suomen Cup)		League cup		Europe		Total	
Club	Season	Division	Apps	Goals	Apps	Goals	Apps	Goals	Apps	Goals	Apps	Goals
KuPS	2008	Veikkausliiga	1	0	0	0	–		–		1	0
KuPS	2009	Veikkausliiga	12	0	0	0	6	1	–		18	1
KuPS	Total		13	0	0	0	6	1	0	0	19	1
Greuther Fürth II	2012–13	Regionalliga Bayern	31	1	–		–		–		31	1
KuPS	2013	Veikkausliiga	11	0	2	0	0	0	–		13	0
KuPS	2014	Veikkausliiga	33	0	3	0	4	0	–		40	0
KuPS	2015	Veikkausliiga	29	1	5	0	4	0	–		38	1
KuPS	2016	Veikkausliiga	22	0	4	1	4	0	–		30	1
KuPS	2017	Veikkausliiga	18	0	6	1	–		–		24	1
KuPS	Total		113	1	20	2	12	0	0	0	145	3
KuFu-98 (loan)	2016	Kakkonen	2	0	–		–		–		2	0
Ilves	2018	Veikkausliiga	19	0	5	0	–		1 (Note: Appearances in UEFA Europa League)	0	25	0
Career total			178	2	25	2	18	1	1	0	222	5
