= Lauri Saari =

Finnish painter (1888–1953)

Lauri Abel Saari (born 2 January 1888 in Urjala, died 10 June 1953) was a Finnish painter. He studied at the Central School for Applied Arts in 1910–1913 and the Turku Drawing School 1920–1922. Saari also took lessons from the Norwegian painter Edvard Munch.

During the 1918 Finnish Civil War, Saari was the commander of the Urjala Red Guards. He was captured after the Battle of Tampere and detained in the Kalevankangas camp.
