= John Weckström =

Finnish footballer (born 1980)

Personal information
- Date of birth: 26 December 1980 (age 45)
- Place of birth: Helsinki, Finland
- Height: 1.73 m (5 ft 8 in)
- Position: Midfielder

Youth career
- 1996: MPS
- 1997: KäPa

Senior career*
Years	Team	Apps	(Gls)
1998–1999	FinnPa	32	(7)
2000	FC Jokerit	18	(7)
2001	Atlantis	18	(0)
2002	AC Allianssi	21	(3)
2003–2004	FF Jaro	45	(9)
2006–2010	FC Honka	90	(18)
2011	FC Haka	26	(2)
2012–2014	PK-35	67	(18)
2015–2016	FC Honka	18	(5)
2016	PK-35	5	(1)
- * Club domestic league appearances and goals as of 19:48, 26 June 2020 (UTC)

John Weckström (born 26 December 1980) is a Finnish retired professional football player.
