= Antto Tapaninen =

Finnish footballer (born 1989)

Personal information
- Date of birth: 16 June 1989 (age 37)
- Place of birth: Jyväskylä, Finland
- Height: 1.83 m (6 ft 0 in)
- Position: Centre back

Team information
- Current team: TPS
- Number: 16

Youth career
- JJK

Senior career*
Years	Team	Apps	(Gls)
2008–2012	JJK	42	(0)
2013	MP	26	(2)
2014–2017	JJK	98	(6)
2018–	TPS	1	(0)
- * Club domestic league appearances and goals as of 20 May 2018

Antto Tapaninen (born 16 June 1989) is a Finnish football player currently playing for Turun Palloseura. During the Veikkausliiga match against Tampere United on 23 April 2010, Tapaninen suffered a broken leg injury, which is estimated to keep him sidelined for at least three months.
