= Juho Nykänen =

Finnish footballer (born 1985)

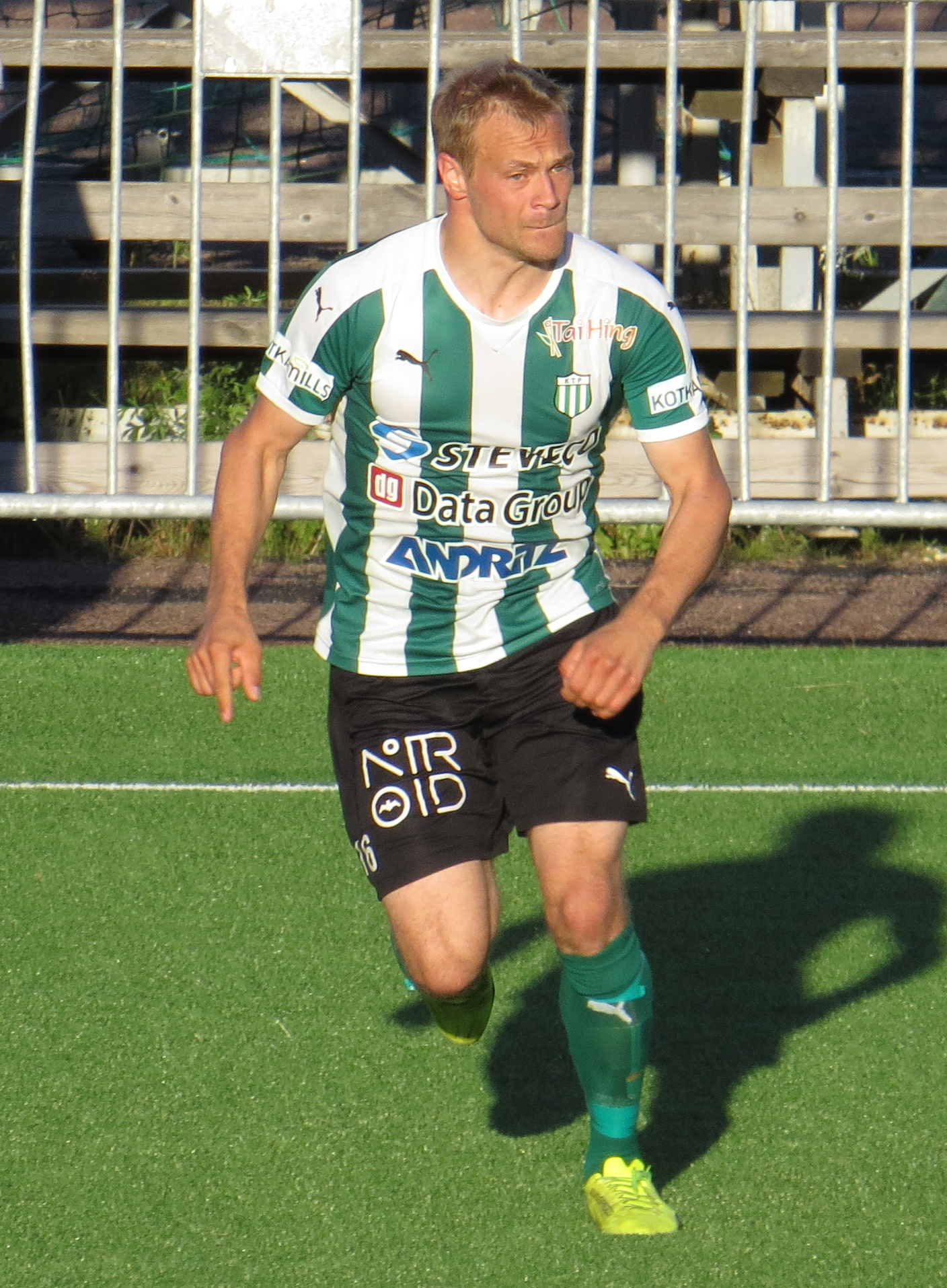
- Nykänen with KTP in 2017

Personal information
- Date of birth: 11 September 1985 (age 41)
- Place of birth: Kotka, Finland
- Height: 1.77 m (5 ft 9 1/2 in)
- Position: Midfielder

Team information
- Current team: KTP

Senior career*
Years	Team	Apps	(Gls)
2003–2006	KooTeePee	51	(4)
2007–2008	MYPA	25	(2)
2009	KooTeePee	23	(3)
2010–2011	KuPS	48	(0)
2012	KooTeePee	19	(2)
2013	KTP	17	(1)
2014–2016	Peli-Karhut	42	(12)
2017	KTP	21	(13)
- * Club domestic league appearances and goals as of 8 April 2023

Juho Nykänen (born 11 September 1985) is a Finnish former footballer.
