= Yerai Couñago =

Spanish footballer

Personal information
- Full name: Yerai Couñago Vilaboa
- Date of birth: 11 January 1991 (age 35)
- Place of birth: Redondela, Spain
- Height: 1.80 m (5 ft 11 in)
- Position: Midfielder

Team information
- Current team: Arosa

Senior career*
Years	Team	Apps	(Gls)
2010–2012	Choco	?	(16)
2012–2013	Coruxo	8	(0)
2013–2014	Choco	38	(14)
2014	FC Honka	9	(3)
2015–2016	PK-35 Vantaa	33	(5)
2016–2017	Alondras	15	(2)
2017–	Arosa	30	(2)
- * Club domestic league appearances and goals as of 14:46, 16 May 2018 (UTC)

Yerai Couñago Vilaboa (born 11 January 1991), simply known as Yerai is a Spanish footballer playing for Arosa SC as a midfielder.
