= Calvin N'Sombo =

Finnish footballer (born 1997)

Personal information
- Date of birth: 24 June 1997 (age 29)
- Place of birth: Helsinki, Finland
- Height: 1.72 m (5 ft 8 in)
- Position: Midfielder

Team information
- Current team: KäPa
- Number: 7

Youth career
- HJK

Senior career*
Years	Team	Apps	(Gls)
2015	HJK	2	(0)
2015–2018	Klubi-04	28	(2)
2016	→ Honka (loan)	2	(0)
2016	→ PK-35 Vantaa (loan)	2	(0)
2018	Hercules	7	(1)
2019–2022	PEPO	64	(2)
2023–	KäPa	13	(0)

International career
2014	Finland U-17	3	(0)
2015	Finland U-18	6	(0)
2015	Finland U-19	1	(0)
2017	North Macedonia U-20	2	(0)
2017	North Macedonia U-21	1	(0)
- * Club domestic league appearances and goals as of 27 November 2023

Calvin N'Sombo (born 24 June 1997) is a footballer who plays as a midfielder for KäPa. Born in Finland, he represented Finland on junior levels before switching allegiance to North Macedonia for older age brackets.

== Club career ==
N'Sombo started his career with HJK, Finland's most successful club, where he made two appearances. On 17 February 2015, he debuted for HJK during a 2–2 draw with RoPS.

In 2015, he signed for Klubi-04 in the Finnish third division.

In 2016, N'Sombo was sent on loan to Finnish top flight side PK-35 Vantaa, where he made two league appearances. On 12 September 2016, he debuted for PK-35 Vantaa during a 3–1 loss to Ilves.

In 2018, N'Sombo signed for Hercules in the Finnish third division.

== International career ==
H N'Sombo e is eligible to represent North Macedonia internationally through his mother. After representing Finland from Under-17 to Under-19 age brackets, he moved to representing the North Macedonia Under-21.
