= Niklas Blomqvist =

Finnish footballer (born 1996)

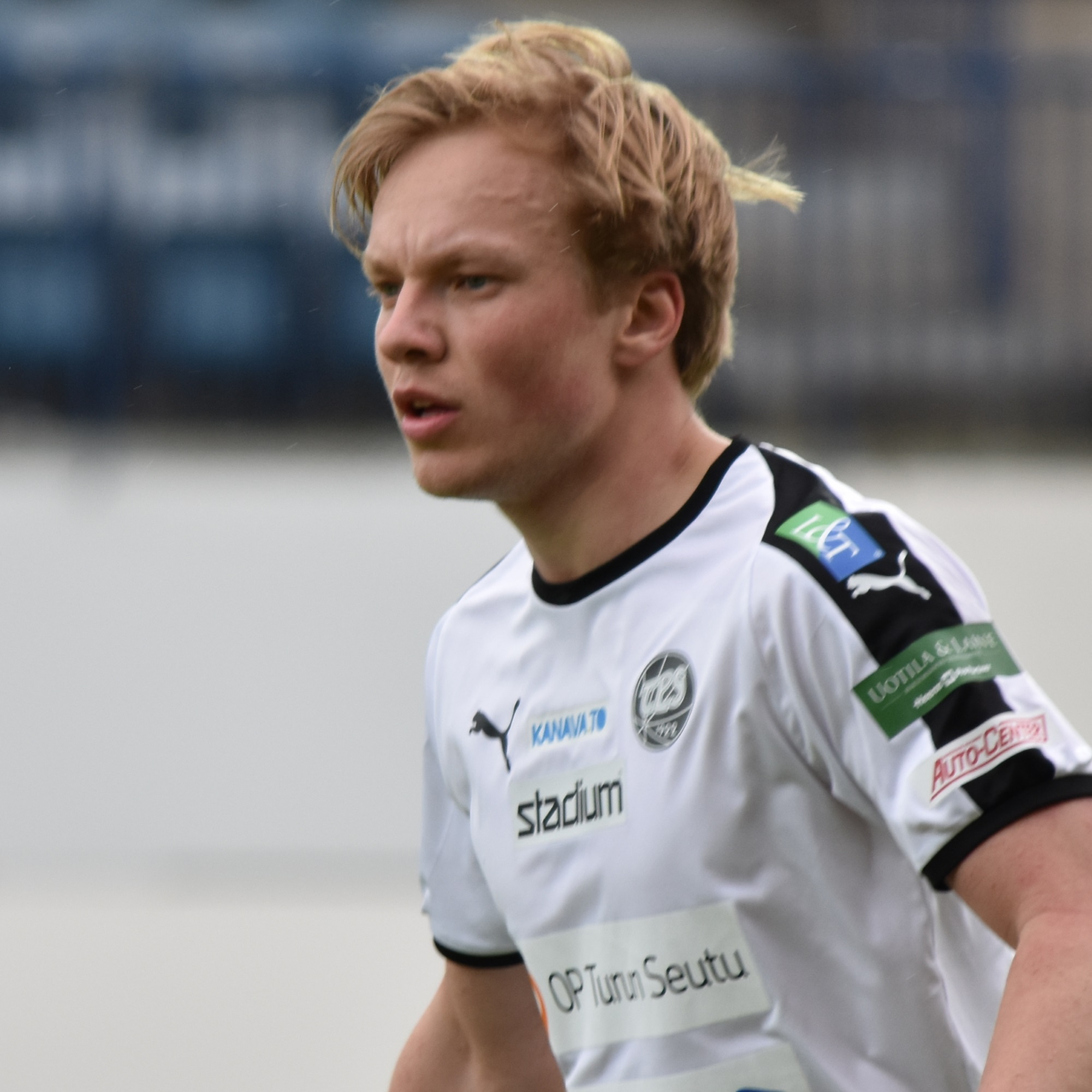

Personal information
- Date of birth: 8 February 1996 (age 30)
- Place of birth: Finland
- Height: 1.76 m (5 ft 9 in)
- Position: Midfielder

Senior career*
Years	Team	Apps	(Gls)
2014–2018	TPS	114	(7)
2014	→ Åbo IFK (loan)	19	(0)
2019–2021	KaaPo	53	(4)
- * Club domestic league appearances and goals

Niklas Blomqvist (born 8 February 1996) is a Finnish former professional footballer who played as a midfielder. (Note: Niklas Blomqvist at Soccerway (archived). Retrieved 19 June 2018.) Blomqvist began his career at Turun Nappulaliiga. He was named the best player of the Kai Pahlman tournament in 2011.
