= Ali Hajizade =

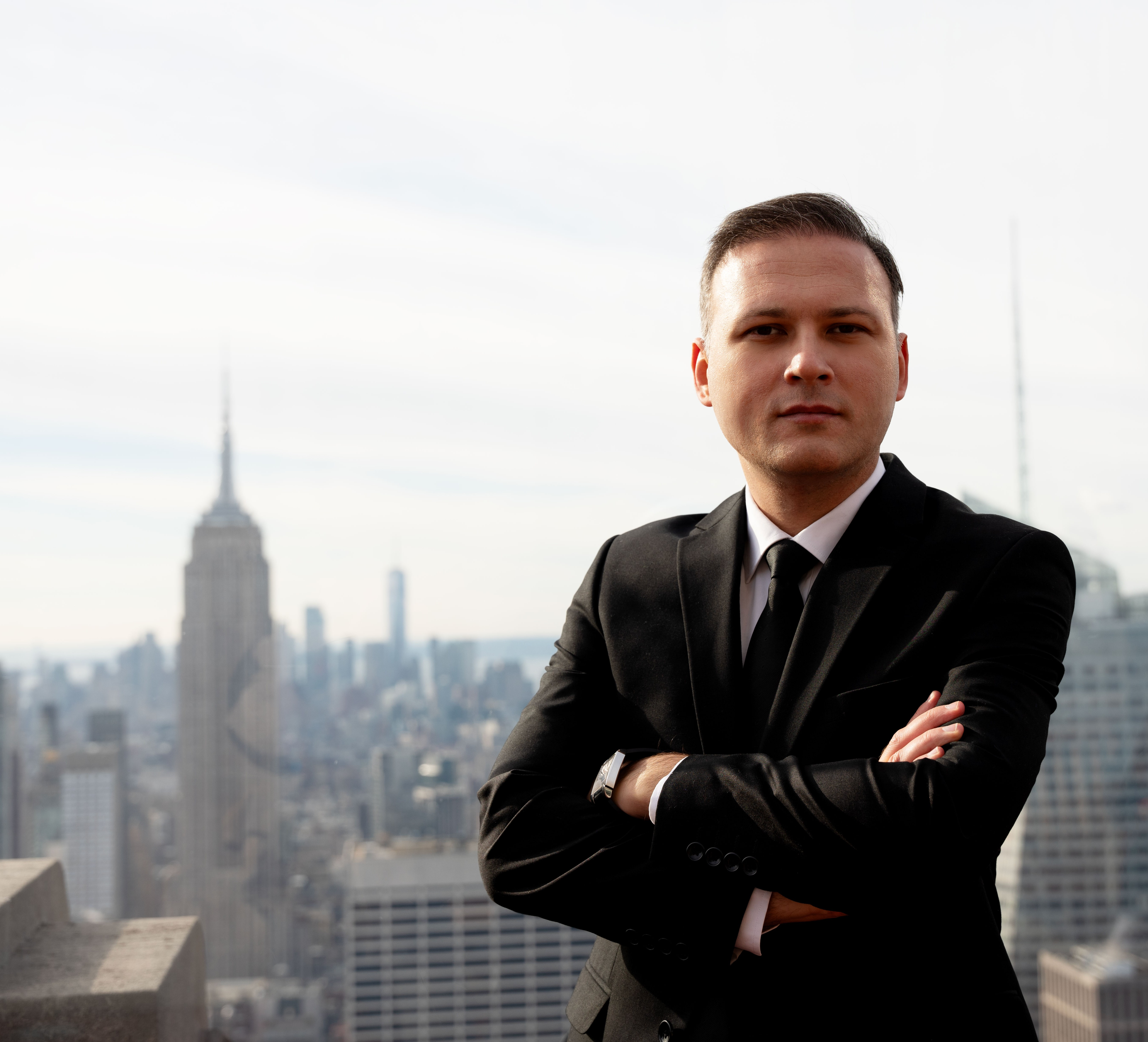
- Born: 26 February 1984 (age 42); Baku, Azerbaijan SSR, Soviet Union
- Education: Azerbaijan State Academy of Fine Arts
- Occupations: Middle East analyst, entrepreneur
- Website: alihajizade.com

Ali Hajizade (Azerbaijani: Əli Hacızadə) is an analyst of the Middle East and entrepreneur.

== Early life and education ==
Hajizade was born on February 26, 1984, in Baku, Azerbaijan. He graduated from the Azerbaijan State Academy of Fine Arts with a degree in History of Art.

== Career ==
As a Middle East analyst, Hajizade contributed to and was cited in a number of Western, as well as Turkish, Israeli media outlets and publications. Hajizade's publications on malicious information activity were referred to by other researchers.

Since 2012, Hajizade has headed the "Hajizade Group", which operates in the field of public relations. According to market research conducted by a major Azerbaijani news outlet, Hajizade Group was recognized as the top public relations firm in the country based on 2023 performance results.

In total, he is both the founder and head of three PR firms in the USA, Azerbaijan, and the United Arab Emirates.

In addition to his practical work in the PR field, he also acts as a theorist in the field of crisis communications and the transformation of communications in the context of the development and integration of AI.

In 2015, Ali Hajizade launched "The Greater Middle East" project, dedicated to the research and analysis of the Greater Middle East region. A number of prominent experts contributed to the project. Hajizade left the project in late 2021.

The main focus of Hajizade as a Middle East analyst is the study and analysis of tactics of hybrid wars, information wars and disinformation campaigns.

In 2018–2019, Hajizade was a columnist for Al Arabiya English.

In the fall of 2022, Hajizade was selected as a fellow in the Rumsfeld Foundation's Central Asia Caucasus Fellowship Program in Washington, D.C.

In early 2022, Hajizade founded a US-based startup dealing with human-focused information security and parallelly offering employee training and educational solutions for higher education institutions. The company created by Hajizade is a training provider whose main task is to provide solutions through educational programs and a series of training. He described the Tarand mission regarding human-focused information security in an interview with Total Prestige Magazine in 2023:

We teach people to understand what malicious information activity is and how to recognize, classify and take measures to stop or prevent such activity. Through education and raising awareness, we try to boost the immunity of societies, countries, and individuals. In addition, our solutions are beneficial for military personnel, as they are usually the major and top priority targets for psychological operations and other types of information attacks.

In his commentary for TechTimes, Hajizade characterized disinformation and manipulation as "the weapons of modern information warfare."
