= Jerome Ogbuefi =

Nigerian footballer

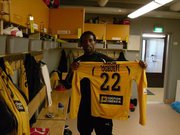

Personal information
- Full name: Jerome Tochukwu Ogbuefi
- Date of birth: August 26, 1991 (age 35)
- Place of birth: Nigeria
- Height: 1.82 m (5 ft 11 1/2 in)
- Position: Midfielder

Team information
- Current team: Kajaanin Haka
- Number: 25

Senior career*
Years	Team	Apps	(Gls)
2009	Thanh Hóa		
2010	KuPS	7	(0)
2011	HauPa	12	(1)
2012	Kemi Kings	23	(8)
2013	Teravit	11	(3)
2013	Kemi Kings	15	(0)
2014	AC Kajaani	11	(2)
2015	OrPa	5	(5)
2015	TP-47	7	(1)
2016–2018	JS Hercules	48	(3)
2019–	Kajaanin Haka	9	(4)
- * Club domestic league appearances and goals as of 16:19, 5 December 2019 (UTC)

Jerome Tochukwu Ogbuefi (born 26 August 1991) is a Nigerian footballer. He currently plays for the Finnish Kakkonen club Kajaanin Haka.
