= Joni Remesaho =

Finnish footballer (born 1993)

Personal information
- Date of birth: 15 July 1993 (age 33)
- Place of birth: Finland
- Height: 1.78 m (5 ft 10 in)
- Position: Left winger

Team information
- Current team: Jaro
- Number: 24

Senior career*
| Years | Team | Apps | (Gls) |
| 2011 | JBK | 26 | (6) |
| 2012–2013 | GBK | 10 | (4) |
| 2014–2021 | JBK | 57 | (28) |
| 2014– | Jaro | 166 | (22) |
- * Club domestic league appearances and goals as of 13 November 2026

Joni Remesaho (born 15 July 1993) is a Finnish professional footballer who plays as an left winger for Veikkausliiga club Jaro.

== Honours ==
Jaro

- Ykkösliiga runner-up: 2024
