= Jani Tapani Virtanen =

Finnish footballer (born 1988)

Jani Virtanen
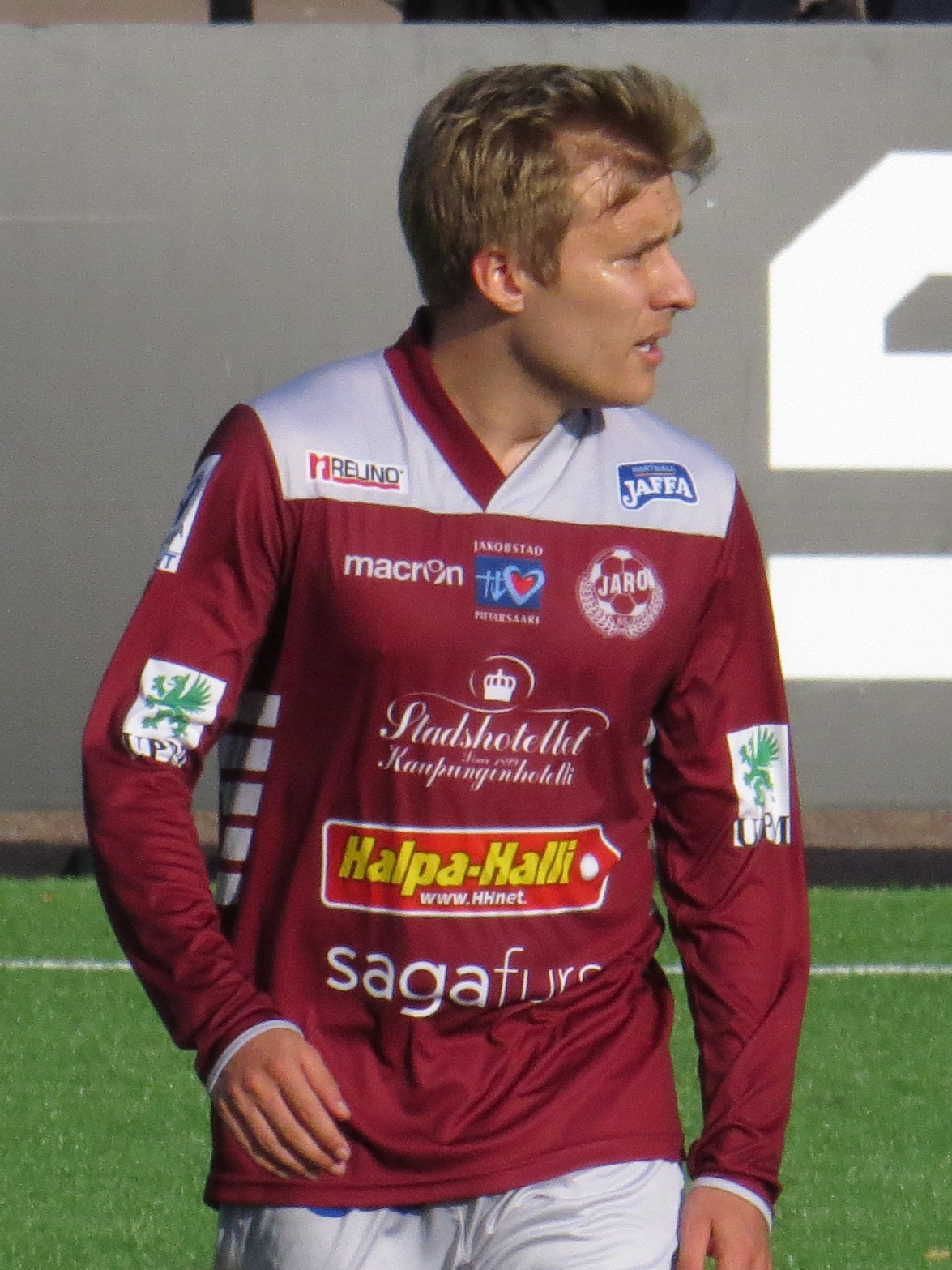
- Virtanen in 2015

Personal information
- Full name: Jani Tapani Virtanen
- Date of birth: 6 May 1988 (age 38)
- Place of birth: Turku, Finland
- Height: 1.75 m (5 ft 9 in)
- Position: Striker

Youth career
- TPS

Senior career*
Years	Team	Apps	(Gls)
2004–2006	TPS	15	(1)
2006–2009	Udinese	1	(0)
2008	→ Sorrento (loan)	3	(0)
2009	→ Khimki (loan)	3	(0)
2010	TPS	7	(0)
2010	Åbo IFK	4	(1)
2010–2014	JJK Jyväskylä	86	(5)
2014–2015	RoPS	20	(0)
2015–2016	Jaro	26	(2)
2016–2019	TPS	63	(16)
- * Club domestic league appearances and goals

Jani Tapani Virtanen (born 6 May 1988) is a Finnish former professional footballer who played as a striker.

== Career ==
Born in Turku, Finland, Virtanen played with Turun Palloseura in Finnish Veikkausliiga between 2004 and 2006. He transferred to Udinese in the summer of 2006, at the age of 18, signing a five-year contract for a fee of €350,000. On 23 December 2006, Virtanen became the fifth Finnish player ever to play in Serie A when he was substituted in for the last three minutes against AC Milan. Virtanen also had two Finnish teammates at Udinese, Roman Eremenko and Jarkko Hurme. In 2008, he was loaned to Sorrento, then to FC Khimki.

In 2010, he played for FC TPS and their reserve team, Åbo IFK, before moving to JJK Jyväskylä in July. Virtanen then moved to RoPS on a one-year contract.

== Career statistics ==
As of 13 June 2024

Appearances and goals by club, season and competition
Club	Season	League			National cup (Note: Includes Suomen Cup and Coppa Italia)		Continental		Other		Total	
Club	Season	Division	Apps	Goals	Apps	Goals	Apps	Goals	Apps	Goals	Apps	Goals
TPS	2004	Veikkausliiga	1	0	–		–		–		1	0
TPS	2005	Veikkausliiga	10	0	1	0	–		–		11	0
TPS	2006	Veikkausliiga	4	1	–		–		–		4	1
TPS	Total		15	1	1	0	0	0	0	0	16	1
Udinese	2006–07	Serie A	1	0	2	0	–		–		3	0
Udinese	2007–08	Serie A	0	0	0	0	–		–		0	0
Udinese	Total		1	0	2	0	0	0	0	0	3	0
Sorrento (loan)	2008–09	Lega Pro Prima Divisione	3	0	2	1	–		–		5	1
Khimki (loan)	2009	Russian Premier League	3	0	–		–		–		3	0
TPS	2010	Veikkausliiga	7	0	2	0	1 (Note: Includes UEFA Europa League)	0	1 (Note: Includes Finnish League Cup)	0	10	0
Åbo IFK	2010	Kakkonen	4	1	–		–		–		4	1
JJK Jyväskylä	2010	Veikkausliiga	11	0	–		–		–		11	0
JJK Jyväskylä	2011	Veikkausliiga	29	4	1	0	–		1	0	31	4
JJK Jyväskylä	2012	Veikkausliiga	20	0	2	1	3	0	6	1	31	2
JJK Jyväskylä	2013	Veikkausliiga	28	0	2	0	–		6	0	36	0
JJK Jyväskylä	Total		88	4	5	1	3	0	13	1	109	6
RoPS	2014	Veikkausliiga	18	0	2	0	1	0	4	1	25	1
Jaro	2015	Veikkausliiga	26	2	1	0	–		3	0	30	2
TPS	2016	Veikkausliiga	25	8	2	2	–		–		27	10
TPS	2017	Ykkönen	21	7	5	2	–		–		26	9
TPS	2018	Veikkausliiga	13	1	4	0	–		–		17	1
TPS	2019	Ykkönen	8	0	2	0	–		–		10	0
TPS	Total		67	16	13	4	0	0	0	0	80	20
Career total			232	24	28	6	5	0	21	2	286	32
