= Loorents Hertsi =

Finnish footballer (born 1992)

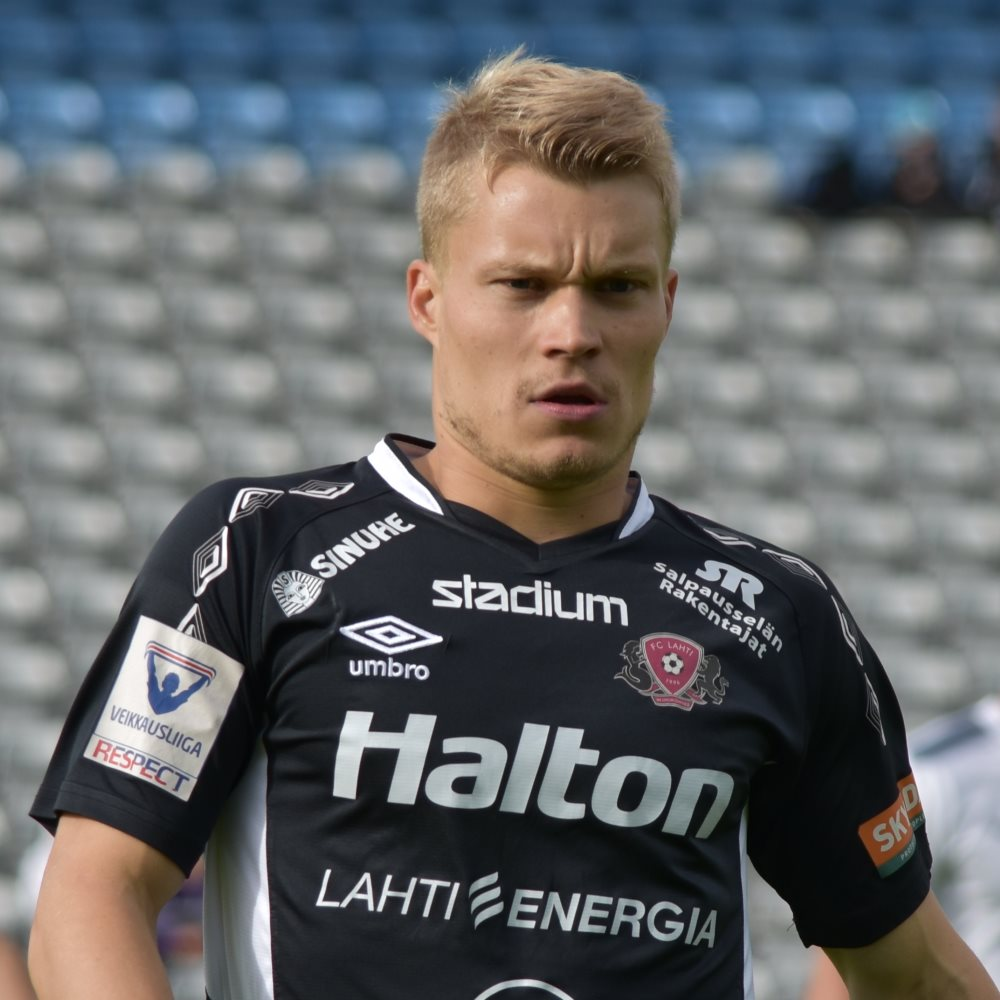
- Hertsi with Lahti in 2017

Personal information
- Date of birth: 13 November 1992 (age 33)
- Place of birth: Helsinki, Finland
- Height: 1.69 m (5 ft 6 1/2 in)
- Position: Winger

Team information
- Current team: Reipas Lahti

Senior career*
Years	Team	Apps	(Gls)
2010–2014	Lahti	64	(9)
2011	→ Lahti Akatemia (loan)	2	(0)
2012	→ Hämeenlinna (loan)	20	(0)
2015–2016	VPS	47	(2)
2017–2018	Lahti	61	(3)
2019–2020	AC Oulu	43	(8)
2021–2023	Lahti	70	(6)
2024–	Reipas Lahti	20	(3)
- * Club domestic league appearances and goals as of 22 December 2024

Loorents Hertsi (born 13 November 1992) is a Finnish footballer who plays for Reipas Lahti as a winger.

== Career ==
Hertsi has played for Lahti, Lahti Akatemia, Hämeenlinna and VPS.

AC Oulu announced the signing of Hertsi for the 2019 season, on 24 December 2018.

On 21 December 2020, he returned to Lahti for the 2021 season.
