= Hämeenlinnan Härmä =

Finnish football club

Härmä
- Full name: Hämeenlinnan Härmä
- Founded: 1967
- Ground: Kauriala, Hämeenlinna, Finland
- Chairman: Harri Uschanov
- Manager: Reijo Vuorinen
- League: Kakkonen
Home colours	Away colours

Hämeenlinnan Härmä (abbreviated Härmä) is a football club from Hämeenlinna, Finland. The club was formed in 1967 and their home ground is Kaurialan kenttä. The men's football first team currently plays in the Kakkonen (Third tier in Finland). Härmä took the place of FC PoPa for season 2012 when the club went bankrupt after the 2011 season.

== Current squad ==
Note: Flags indicate national team as defined under FIFA eligibility rules; some limited exceptions apply. Players may hold more than one non-FIFA nationality.

No.	Pos.	Nation	Player
1	GK	FIN	Tommi Viik
2	MF	FIN	Eetu Kolu
3	DF	FIN	Ilkka Turunen
4	MF	FIN	Jussi Heikkinen
5	DF	FIN	Jari Räsänen
6	DF	FIN	Marko Kouhia
7	MF	FIN	Samuli Kaasalainen
8	FW	FIN	Aleksi Latvanen
9	FW	FIN	Anssi Laine
10	MF	FIN	Timo Lekkermäki
11	DF	FIN	Tommi Salo
12	GK	FIN	Sampsa Hannonen
12	GK	FIN	Tuomas Mäkinen

No.	Pos.	Nation	Player
13	MF	FIN	Juuso Nieminen
14	FW	FIN	Kalle Aaltonen
15	FW	FIN	Atte Koivuniemi
16	MF	FIN	Aleksi Kinnunen
18	DF	FIN	Tuomas Kilkka
19	FW	FIN	Janne Lempinen
20	DF	FIN	Aleksi Topinoja
22	MF	FIN	Juuso Lindroos
23	MF	FIN	Joni Lindroos
25	MF	FIN	Jonas Ruohomäki
26	MF	FIN	Jussi-Pekka Sorri
27	DF	FIN	Tommi Ijäs
