= Tero Karhu =

Finnish journalist and former footballer (born 1979)

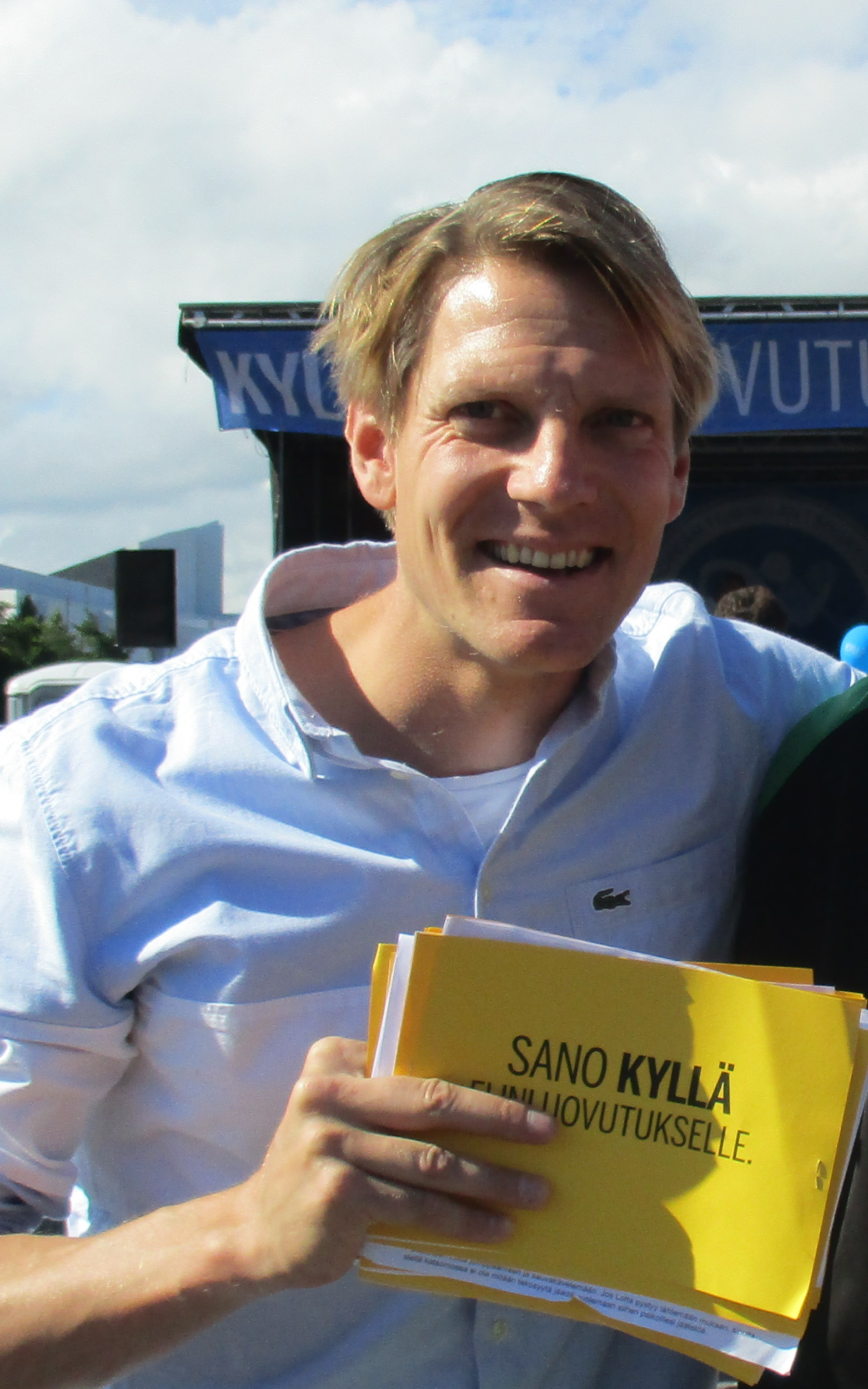

Personal information
- Date of birth: 28 September 1979 (age 47)
- Place of birth: Helsinki, Finland
- Height: 1.85 m (6 ft 1 in)
- Position: Midfielder

Youth career
- 1990–1997: HJK

Senior career*
Years	Team	Apps	(Gls)
1998–1999	FinnPa	24	(2)
1998	→ HPS (loan)	15	(3)
2000–2003	Jokerit	67	(2)
2004–2007	MYPA	62	(6)
2007	→ KooTeePee (loan)	6	(0)
2008–2010	Viikingit	38	(2)
2009	→ PKKU (loan)	1	(0)
- * Club domestic league appearances and goals

Tero Karhu (born 28 September 1979) is a Finnish sport journalist and former footballer who represented FC Viikingit of the Finnish First Division. He usually played as a central midfielder.

== Career ==
Nowadays, Karhu hosts Finnish Premier Division match previews and half time studio broadcasts on Ruutu+. He has also announced football on Canal+ and MTV3. Karhu worked for Finnish broadcasting company Yle in FIFA World Cup 2014 and UEFA Euro 2016.

During a spell in England, Tero played for Billericay Town and Waltham Forest.
