= Vasile Marchiș =

Romanian footballer

Vasile Marchiş
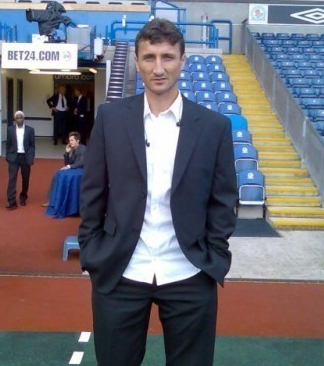

Personal information
- Full name: Vasile Marchiş
- Date of birth: 22 February 1972 (age 54)
- Place of birth: Bistra, Maramureș, Romania
- Height: 1.85 m (6 ft 1 in)
- Position: Central defender

Team information
- Current team: Pallo-Iirot
- Number: 22

Youth career
- Mecanica Sighet
- CIL Sighet

Senior career*
Years	Team	Apps	(Gls)
1995–1996	Astral Deta		
1996–1999	Minerul Moldova Nouă		
1999–2000	Nokian Pyry	19	(0)
2000–2001	Pallo-Iirot	39	(2)
2002	FC Jazz Pori	21	(1)
2003	Tampere United	12	(1)
2004	FC Jazz Pori	24	(0)
2005–2006	Tampere United	35	(2)
2007	MyPa	9	(1)
2008–2015	Pallo-Iirot	164	(34)
2009	→ PoPa (loan)	2	(0)
- * Club domestic league appearances and goals as of 01:58, 6 April 2016 (UTC)

Vasile Marchiş (born 22 February 1972) is a former Romanian football player. He is the only Romanian footballer to have won the Finnish championship.

== Early life ==
Vasile Marchiş was born and raised in Bistra, Maramureș, a small village near the border between Romania and Ukraine.

When Marchiş was 14 years old, a Greco-Roman wrestling trainer from Sighetu Marmaţiei, a town where Vasile was attending the high school, noticed him and took him to the gym. Despite performing very well as a wrestler, his childhood dream was to play professional football.

After three years, Marchiş went to a football trial at Mecanica, a team from Sighetu Marmaţiei. He was accepted, but his wrestling trainer refused Vasile's request and did not let him to the football pitch. After a talk between the two trainers, Marchiş begun his footballing career.

== Career ==
=== Youth ===
After playing for Mecanica, Vasile moved to another Sighet-based football club, CIL. When he was playing for this team, Vasile went at a trial organized by the Liga I side Gloria Bistriţa, but was not accepted.

=== Senior ===
In Romania, Vasile Marchiş played only for lower league clubs, such as Astral, a football team from Deta, Timiș County. The club was dissolved in 1996, and Marchiş moved to Minerul Moldova Nouă, where he spend three seasons. Minerul was the last club where Vasile played in Romania.

In 1999, Ionel Bandu, his coach, asked him if he wants to go at a trial in Finland, organized by the Veikkausliiga club TPV Tampere, a new-promoted club in the first tier of the Finnish football. He went to the trial, and was immediately remarked by the manager of Nokian Pyry, a team which was playing in the second tier, Ykkonen. He accepted the offer and signed a contract with the Finnish club.

After a year at Nokia, Marchiş moved to another Ykkonen club, Pallo-Iirot, where he played for two years and scored his first league goal in Finland. In 2002, FC Jazz Pori, a team which was playing in the Veikkausliiga, made an offer for the Romanian and he made his debut in the first tier.

After only a year, Marchiş was bought by one of the finest teams of the moment in Finland, Tampere United, playing a season in the blue shirt before returning to FC Jazz. After another season, as a result of financial difficulties, the club was dissolved, and Marchiş made his return to Tampere United.

In 2006, Vasile Marchiş won the Finnish championship, Veikkausliiga, with Tampere United. It was his last season in United's shirt, before signing for the former champions of Finland Myllykosken Pallo. It was the last top-flight team for Marchiş, who returned at the third-tier club Pallo-Iirot after six seasons of Veikkausliiga.

In the summer of 2009, he was loaned at Porin Palloilijat, where he played only two league matches before returning to the Rauma-based club.

== Achievements ==
- Veikkausliiga : 2006

== Personal ==
His adoptive son, Andrei Marchiş, is playing for Liga II side FCM Bacău, and he previously played for clubs like CFR Timișoara, Juventus București or Pallo-Iirot.
