= Nicholas Otaru =

Finnish footballer (born 1986)

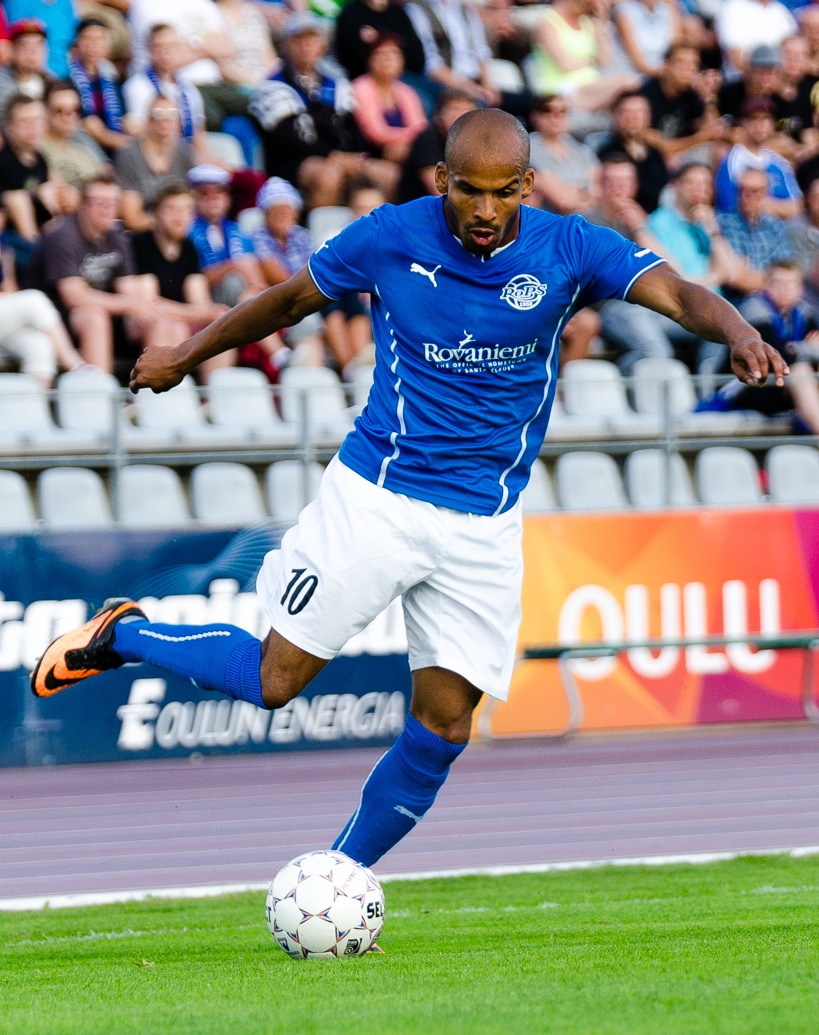
- Nicholas Otaru in RoPS – Asteras Tripolis match 17 July 2014

Personal information
- Date of birth: 15 July 1986 (age 40)
- Place of birth: Turku, Finland
- Height: 1.72 m (5 ft 7 1/2 in)
- Position: Midfielder

Youth career
- 1994–2000: FC Kasiysi
- 2001–2005: FC Espoo

Senior career*
Years	Team	Apps	(Gls)
2004–2005	FC Espoo	28	(2)
2006–2012	FC Honka	151	(10)
2013–2014	RoPS	54	(3)
2015–2016	FC Honka	41	(6)

International career
	Finland U-21	5	(1)
Medal record
Honka
Runner-up	Finnish Cup	2007
Runner-up	Finnish Cup	2008
Runner-up	Veikkausliiga	2008
Runner-up	Veikkausliiga	2009
Winner	Finnish League Cup	2010
Winner	Finnish League Cup	2011
Winner	Finnish Cup	2012
- * Club domestic league appearances and goals

Nicholas Otaru (born 15 July 1986, Turku, Finland) is a Finnish retired professional football player. Otaru was born to a Nigerian father and a Finnish mother.
