= Otto-Pekka Jurvainen =

Finnish footballer (born 1985)

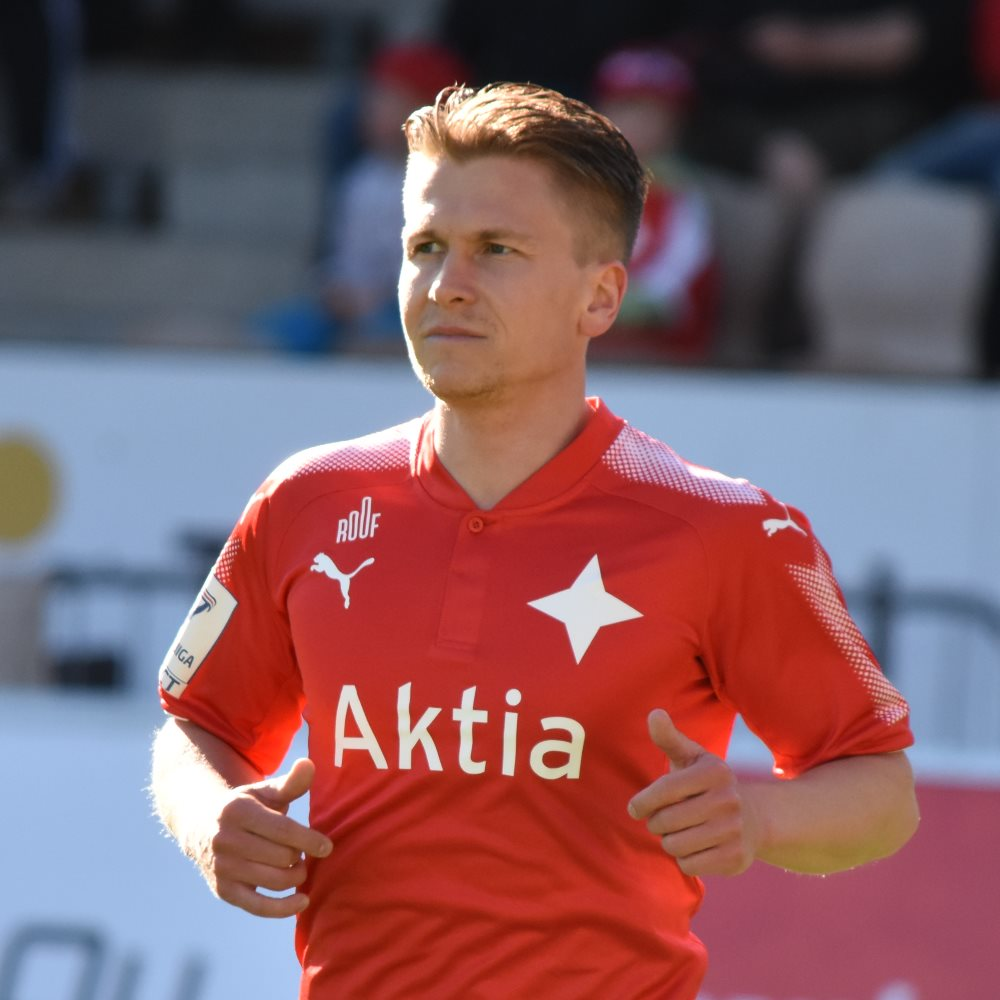

Personal information
- Date of birth: 1 February 1985 (age 41)
- Place of birth: Helsinki, Finland
- Height: 1.72 m (5 ft 8 in)
- Positions: Wingback; winger

Team information
- Current team: HIFK
- Number: 12

Youth career
- 1996–1999: PuiU
- 2000–2004: HJK

Senior career*
Years	Team	Apps	(Gls)
2003	→ Atlantis FC	21	(4)
2004	HJK	6	(0)
2004	→ Klubi 04	9	(0)
2005	Atlantis FC	19	(2)
2006	KäPa	25	(9)
2007–2014	PK-35 Vantaa	199	(22)
2015–2018	HIFK	62	(5)
2019–2021	PK-35	51	(7)

International career
2000	Finland U15	3	(0)
2001	Finland U16	11	(1)
2002	Finland U17	9	(0)
2003	Finland U18	3	(0)
2004	Finland U19	7	(0)
- * Club domestic league appearances and goals as of 1 January 2022

Otto-Pekka Jurvainen (born 1 February 1985) is a Finnish former footballer who played as a defender.

He is a former youth talent of Puistolan Urheilijat of Helsinki. He has played for HJK as a youth player as well. He has represented Finnish national team on different youth levels on 33 occasions. He made his debut in the highest level of Finnish football, Veikkausliiga, on 13 May 2004. During that season, he played in 6 matches in the league for HJK and in 9 matches for the reserve team Klubi 04.

After his spell in HJK, he moved to Atlantis FC in 2005 to play Ykkönen. The next season in 2006, he played for Käpylän Pallo who played in Kakkonen, the third level of Finnish football. The next season, he moved to play for PK-35 of Vantaa, who played on the second highest level in Ykkönen. Jurvainen spent seven years in PK-35 before joining HIFK after the season of 2014, who were promoted to Veikkausliiga.
