= David Carlsson (footballer) =

Swedish footballer

- David Carlsson, 2008.

Personal information
- Full name: David Carlsson
- Date of birth: March 7, 1983 (age 43)
- Place of birth: Stockholm, Sweden
- Height: 1.83 m (6 ft 0 in)
- Position: Forward

Youth career
- Tullinge TP

Senior career*
Years	Team	Apps	(Gls)
2001	Brommapojkarna	5	(2)
2002	Älvsjö AIK FF		
2003–2008	IFK Mariehamn	123	(52)
2006	→ HJK Helsinki (loan)	7	(1)
2009–2010	Brommapojkarna	2	(0)
2009	→ Västerås SK (loan)	11	(8)
2009	→ Gröndals IK (loan)	13	(5)
2010	IK Brage	7	(0)
2012	Assyriska Botkyrka FF	14	(7)
2013	GBK	21	(12)
2014–2015	FF Jaro	27	(1)
2016–2020	GBK	98	(71)
- * Club domestic league appearances and goals

David "Tulle" Carlsson (born March 7, 1983) is a Swedish footballer.

== Career ==
Carlsson played a total of six seasons at IFK Mariehamn in Finland after his arrival from Swedish Älvsjö AIK FF. He scored both goals in the play-off final when IFK Mariehamn was promoted to the Veikkausliiga in 2004. He also scored second most goals in the league in his first season in the top flight (14 goals in 25 matches).

In 2006 Carlsson went on a short-term loan to HJK Helsinki at the end of the season, but returned to Mariehamn. He managed to score one goal while in Helsinki.

On November 17, 2008, it was announced that Carlsson would join newly promoted Brommapojkarna, his former club, for the 2009 season in the Swedish top flight.

He ended his career in Gamlakarleby Bollklubb, where he was a highly prolific goalscorer.
