= Antto Hilska =

Finnish footballer (born 1993)

Personal information
- Date of birth: 22 September 1993 (age 33)
- Place of birth: Tampere, Finland
- Height: 1.80 m (5 ft 11 in)
- Position: Striker

Youth career
- TPV

Senior career*
Years	Team	Apps	(Gls)
2010	TPV	21	(5)
2011–2015	JJK	107	(27)
2016–2017	FC Ilves	26	(1)
2017–2021	Haka	88	(11)

International career
- Finland U-17
- Finland U-19
	Finland U-21	4	(1)
- * Club domestic league appearances and goals as of 31 October 2021

Antto Hilska (born 22 September 1993) is a Finnish football player.
