= Tommi Viik =

Finnish footballer (born 1987)

Tommi Viik (born 6 April 1987) is a Finnish professional footballer who played for Veikkausliiga side FC Haka.

== Career ==
He was promoted in January 2006 to the senior team from FC Haka and released in January 2009.
