= Jussi Heikkinen =

Finnish footballer (born 1988)

Personal information
- Date of birth: 19 July 1988 (age 38)
- Place of birth: Hämeenlinna, Finland
- Height: 1.70 m (5 ft 7 in)
- Position: Defender

Team information
- Current team: FC Lahti
- Number: 16

Senior career*
Years	Team	Apps	(Gls)
2009–	Lahti	2	(0)
- * Club domestic league appearances and goals as of 8 October 2009

Jussi Heikkinen (born 19 July 1988 in Hämeenlinna) is a Finnish football player currently playing for FC Lahti.
