= Mikko Hyyrynen =

Finnish footballer (born 1977)

Personal information
- Date of birth: 1 November 1977 (age 49)
- Place of birth: Lappeenranta, Finland
- Height: 1.81 m (5 ft 11 in)
- Position: Striker

Senior career*
Years	Team	Apps	(Gls)
2001	Lahti	8	(0)
2002–2006	TPS	104	(39)
2007	MyPa	22	(4)
2008–2009	Jaro	48	(15)
2010–2011	JJK	46	(13)
2012–2017	TPS	147	(31)
Total		375	(102)

International career
2005	Finland	2	(0)
- * Club domestic league appearances and goals

Mikko Hyyrynen (born 1 November 1977) is a Finnish former professional footballer who played as a striker.

== Career ==
Born in Lappeenranta, Hyyrynen debuted in Veikkausliiga for FC Lahti in 2001 but did not make his real breakthrough into top-flight football until the 2003 season when he was playing for the newly promoted TPS. He stayed at TPS for five seasons before moving on to MyPa and then FF Jaro. In winter 2009 he signed a two-year contract with JJK. He guided his new team to the Finnish League Cup 2010 final, where they lost to FC Honka on penalties. He scored his 50th Veikkausliiga goal in a 3–2 win over FC Honka on 23 August 2010.

After the 2011 season his contract with JJK expired and he returned to Turku, to sign a one-year contract with TPS, a club which he presented between 2002–2006.

Hyyrynen was capped twice for the Finland national team in friendly matches against Kuwait and Saudi Arabia in March 2005 but was not called up later.

In October 2017, he announced he would retire from professional football at the end of the season and would play his final match on 21 October.

Later he has coached Åbo IFK, TPS women and in the TPS youth sector.
