= Johannes Mononen =

Finnish footballer (born 1991)

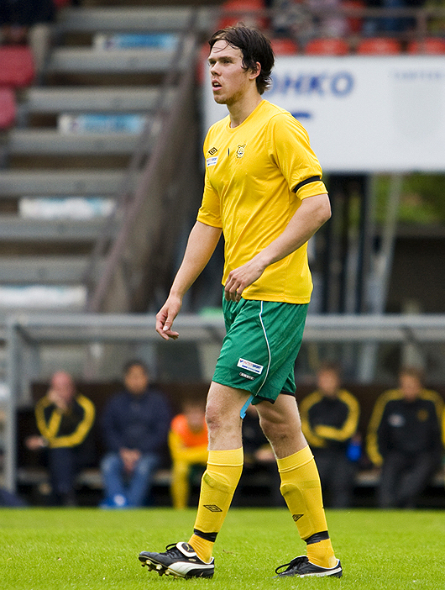

Personal information
- Date of birth: 4 May 1991 (age 35)
- Place of birth: Finland
- Height: 1.88 m (6 ft 2 in)
- Position: Defender

Team information
- Current team: AC Oulu
- Number: 27

Senior career*
Years	Team	Apps	(Gls)
2006–2009	JIPPO	25	(0)
2007	→ JIPPO/2 (dual registration)	13	(0)
2008	→ JIPPO/2 (dual registration)	10	(0)
2009	→ Tampere United (loan)	5	(0)
2009	→ JIPPO/2 (dual registration)	4	(0)
2009–2010	Tampere United	10	(0)
2009	→ TPV (loan)	4	(0)
2010	→ TPV (loan)	9	(0)
2010	→ Ilves (loan)	1	(1)
2011	AC Oulu	7	(0)
2011	→ FC OPA (loan)	2	(0)
2012	FC Hämeenlinna	13	(1)
2013–2014	JIPPO	22	(0)
- * Club domestic league appearances and goals as of 5 August 2010

Johannes Mononen (born 4 May 1991) is a Finnish footballer, who formerly represented AC Oulu of Ykkönen, the second highest level of football in Finland. He was also part of Finland national under-18 football team. He is a defender and usually plays the position of central defender. Mononen's youth team was JIPPO from Joensuu, for which he also played 13 matches in Ykkönen, the second highest level of football in Finland, in 2008. After that he made a contract with Tampere United of the premier league. He has been on trial with Italian teams Inter Milan and Chievo Verona.
