= Antti Kuosmanen =

Finnish diplomat

Antti Juhana Kuosmanen (born 1950, in Juva) is a Finnish diplomat. He headed the Finnish Embassy in Singapore for six months in 2015. In 2013–2015 he was Finland's Senior Official for ASEM (Asia-Europe Meeting). In 2009–2013 he was Finland's Permanent Representative to the OECD and UNESCO. Until then he was Finland's Ambassador to the People's Republic of China and Mongolia (2005–2009).

Kuosmanen joined the Finnish Diplomatic Service in 1976 and has, before the assignments cited above, served in various functions, including as Director General for External Economic Relations, Deputy Director General of the EU Secretariat, Director for Western European Economic Integration, and member of the team that negotiated Finland's accession to the European Union. He served as director at the General Secretariat of the Council of the EU in 1996–2002 and has written a book on Finland's accession negotiations to the EU entitled Finland's Journey to the European Union (EIPA 2001).

Kuosmanen is married to Satu Kuosmanen and has two adult daughters. He is retired from active service since 1 March 2018.
