= FC Legirus Inter =

Former football club in Vantaa, Finland

FC Legirus Inter was an association football club based in Vantaa, Finland.

== History ==
Legirus Inter was founded in 2015. The club was disbanded in 2017.
