= 2019 FC Honka season =

FC Honka
2019 season
- Chairman: Färid Ainetdin
- Manager: Vesa Vasara
- Stadium: Tapiolan Urheilupuisto
- Veikkausliiga: 3rd
- Finnish Cup: Quarterfinal
- Top goalscorer: League: Borjas Martín (12)
| Home colours | Away colours |

The 2019 season was FC Honka's 11th season in the Veikkausliiga. On 3 November 2019, Honka secured a spot in the Europa League 2020–21 first round of qualification by winning IFK Mariehamn 3 - 1 on aggregate in the European competition play-off finals.

== Squad ==
As of 9 August 2019

| No. | Name | Nationality | Position | Date of birth (age) | Signed from |
Goalkeepers
| 12 | Rasmus Leislahti | (Finland) | GK | 16 June 2000 (aged 19) | Klubi 04 |
| 13 | Tim Murray | (United States) | GK | 30 July 1987 (aged 32) | Ekenäs IF |
Defenders
| 3 | Gideon Baah | (Ghana) | DF | 1 October 1991 (aged 28) | FC Gomel |
| 4 | Robert Ivanov | (Finland) | DF | 19 September 1994 (aged 25) | FC Viikingit |
| 5 | Henri Aalto | (Finland) | DF | 20 April 1989 (aged 30) | VfB Oldenburg |
| 7 | Jonas Levänen | (Finland) | DF | 12 January 1994 (aged 25) | VPS |
| 16 | Konsta Rasimus | (Finland) | DF | 15 December 1990 (aged 28) | PK-35 Vantaa |
| 22 | Joona Rahikka | (Finland) | DF | 29 January 1999 (aged 20) | KäPa |
| 23 | Mikko Sumusalo | (Finland) | DF | 12 March 1990 (aged 29) | HJK |
| 24 | Nasiru Banahene | (Ghana) | DF | 8 July 2000 (aged 19) | MTK Budapest |
| 28 | Tommi Saarinen | (Finland) | DF | 31 January 1995 (aged 24) | Pallohonka |
Midfielders
| 8 | Javi Hervás | (Spain) | MF | 9 June 1989 (aged 30) | Mérida A.D. |
| 10 | Lucas Kaufmann | (Brazil) | MF | 26 March 1991 (aged 28) | Ekenäs IF |
| 11 | Juha Hakola | (Finland) | MF | 27 October 1987 (aged 32) | VPS |
| 20 | Erik Bakker | (Netherlands) | MF | 21 March 1990 (aged 29) | De Graafschap |
| 21 | Joel Perovuo | (Finland) | MF | 11 August 1985 (aged 34) | HJK |
| 33 | Duarte Tammilehto (captain) | (Finland) | MF | 15 February 1990 (aged 29) | FC Lahti |
| 45 | Robbie Azodo | (Finland) | MF | 23 April 2001 (aged 18) | PK Keski-Uusimaa |
| 68 | Armend Kabashi | (Finland) | MF | 4 December 1995 (aged 23) | TuS Erndtebrück |
| 77 | Doni Arifi | (Finland) | MF | 11 April 2002 (aged 17) | Honka Akatemia |
| 85 | Matias Viitanen | (Finland) | MF | 27 February 2001 (aged 18) | Honka Akatemia |
Forwards
| 14 | Borjas Martín | (Spain) | FW | 28 June 1987 (aged 32) | Sabadell |
| 15 | Martin Salin | (Finland) | FW | 2 January 2002 (aged 17) | Honka Akatemia |
| 18 | Elmo Heinonen | (Finland) | FW | 2 April 1997 (aged 22) | Salon Palloilijat |
| 19 | Arlind Sejdiu | (Finland) | FW | 11 August 2001 (aged 18) | Honka Akatemia |
| 51 | Anton Tuominen | (Finland) | FW | 9 February 2001 (aged 18) | Honka Akatemia |
| 80 | Demba Savage | (The Gambia) | FW | 17 June 1988 (aged 31) | BB Erzurumspor |
| 99 | Macoumba Kandji | (Senegal) | FW | 2 August 1985 (aged 34) | Sanat Naft |

=== On loan ===
Note: Flags indicate national team as defined under FIFA eligibility rules; some limited exceptions apply. Players may hold more than one non-FIFA nationality.

| No. | Pos. | Nation | Player |
|---|---|---|---|
| 32 | GK | FIN | Atte Paunio (on loan at FC Jazz until end of season) |

== Transfers ==
=== Winter ===
==== In ====
| Date | Position | Nationality | Name | From | Fee | Ref. |
|---|---|---|---|---|---|---|
| | GK | (Finland) | Rasmus Leislahti | Klubi 04 | Undisclosed | |
| | DF | (Ghana) | Gideon Baah | FC Gomel | Undisclosed | |
| | DF | (Finland) | Mikko Sumusalo | HJK | Undisclosed | |
| | DF | (Finland) | Joona Rahikka | KäPa | Undisclosed | |
| | MF | (Spain) | Abel Suárez | Linense | Undisclosed | |
| | MF | (Finland) | Juha Hakola | VPS | Undisclosed | |
| | MF | (Finland) | Saku Heiskanen | TSG 1899 Hoffenheim | Undisclosed | |
| | FW | (Finland) | Robbie Azodo | Pallokerho Keski-Uusimaa | Undisclosed | |
| | FW | (Mexico) | Luis Silva | Real Salt Lake | Undisclosed | |

==== Out ====
| Date | Position | Nationality | Name | To | Fee | Ref. |
|---|---|---|---|---|---|---|
| | GK | (North Macedonia) | Davor Taleski | AEL | Undisclosed | |
| | DF | (Norway) | Ahmed El Amrani | Skeid | Undisclosed | |
| | DF | (Serbia) | Željko Savić | TPS | Undisclosed | |
| | DF | (Finland) | Jatuli Laevuo | | Undisclosed | |
| | MF | (Finland) | Antti Mäkijärvi | KTP | Undisclosed | |
| | MF | (Finland) | Joni Korhonen | AC Oulu | Undisclosed | |
| | MF | (Finland) | Armend Kabashi | | Undisclosed | |
| | FW | (Finland) | Masar Ömer | | Undisclosed | |
| | FW | (Finland) | Kasperi Liikonen | KTP | Undisclosed | |
| | FW | (Liberia) | Alex Nimely | | Undisclosed | |
| | FW | (Finland) | Youness Rahimi | RoPS | Undisclosed | |
| | FW | (Serbia) | Nemanja Obradović | Spartak Subotica | Undisclosed | |
| | FW | (Senegal) | Macoumba Kandji | Sanat Naft | Undisclosed | |
| | FW | (Cameroon) | Gaël Etock | FC Lahti | Undisclosed | |

=== Summer ===
==== In ====
| Date | Position | Nationality | Name | From | Fee | Ref. |
|---|---|---|---|---|---|---|
| 9 August 2019 | FW | (Senegal) | Macoumba Kandji | Sanat Naft | Undisclosed | |
| 9 August 2019 | MF | (Netherlands) | Erik Bakker | De Graafschap | Undisclosed | |
| 9 August 2019 | FW | (Finland) | Elmo Heinonen | Salon Palloilijat | Undisclosed | |
| 9 August 2019 | DF | (Ghana) | Nasiru Banahene | MTK Budapest | Undisclosed | |
| 29 August 2019 | MF | (Finland) | Armend Kabashi | | Undisclosed | |

==== Out ====
| Date | Position | Nationality | Name | To | Fee | Ref. |
|---|---|---|---|---|---|---|
| 8 August 2019 | FW | (Mexico) | Luis Silva | Seattle Sounders FC | Undisclosed | |
| 9 August 2019 | MF | (Spain) | Abel Suárez | | Undisclosed | |
| 9 August 2019 | MF | (Finland) | Saku Heiskanen | | Undisclosed | |

== Competitions ==
=== Veikkausliiga ===
The 2019 Veikkausliiga season begins on 3 April 2019 and ends on 3 November 2019.

==== League table ====
| Pos | Team | Pld | W | D | L | GF | GA | GD | Pts | Qualification or relegation (Note: Teams played against each other twice (22 matches) after which the league split in two (top 6 and bottom 6 teams).) |
|---|---|---|---|---|---|---|---|---|---|---|
| 1 | KuPS (C) | 27 | 15 | 8 | 4 | 46 | 24 | +22 | 53 | Qualification for the Champions League first qualifying round. |
| 2 | Inter Turku | 27 | 15 | 3 | 9 | 42 | 29 | +13 | 48 | Qualification for the Europa League first qualifying round. |
| 3 | FC Honka (O) | 27 | 14 | 5 | 8 | 41 | 29 | +12 | 47 | Qualification for the national Europa League qualification final. |
| 4 | Ilves | 27 | 13 | 8 | 6 | 34 | 25 | +9 | 47 | Qualification for the Europa League first qualifying round. (Note: Ilves qualified for the Europa League first qualifying round by winning the 2019 Finnish Cup) |
| 5 | HJK | 27 | 9 | 10 | 8 | 33 | 29 | +4 | 37 | Qualification for the national Europa League qualification tournament. |

Source: Veikkausliiga, Soccerway
Rules for classification: 1) Points; 2) Goal difference; 3) Goals scored; 4) Head-to-head points; 5) Head-to-head goal difference; 6) Head-to-head away goals scored; 7) Play-off
(Note: Play-off is only played if need to decide champion, teams for relegation or UEFA competition and will be played on a neutral ground).
(C) Champions; (O) Play-off winners

==== Results summary ====
| Overall | | | | | | | | Home | | | | | | Away | | | | | |
| Pld | W | D | L | GF | GA | GD | Pts | W | D | L | GF | GA | GD | W | D | L | GF | GA | GD |
|---|---|---|---|---|---|---|---|---|---|---|---|---|---|---|---|---|---|---|---|
| 27 | 14 | 5 | 8 | 41 | 29 | +12 | 47 | 6 | 2 | 5 | 19 | 13 | +6 | 8 | 3 | 3 | 22 | 16 | +6 |

Last updated: 19 October 2019.
Source: See Results

==== Results by matchday ====
| Round | 1 | 2 | 3 | 4 | 5 | 6 | 7 | 8 | 9 | 10 | 11 | 12 | 13 | 14 | 15 | 16 | 17 | 18 | 19 | 20 | 21 | 22 | 23 | 24 | 25 | 26 | 27 |
|---|---|---|---|---|---|---|---|---|---|---|---|---|---|---|---|---|---|---|---|---|---|---|---|---|---|---|---|
| Ground | A | H | A | H | A | A | H | A | H | H | A | H | A | H | H | A | H | A | H | A | H | A | A | H | A | A | H |
| Result | W | L | W | W | L | D | D | W | W | L | W | W | D | L | W | L | L | W | D | L | L | W | W | W | W | D | W |

Updated to match(es) played on 2019. Source: See Results
A = Away; H = Home; W = Win; D = Draw; L = Loss

==== Regular season ====
| 7 April 2019 1 | RoPS | 1 – 2 | Honka | Rovaniemi |
| 14:00 EET (UTC+3) | S. Ala (yellow card) 70'; Jokelainen 81'; Sissoko (yellow card) 83' | Report | Martín 48'; Baah 71'; Silva (yellow card) 75'; Sumusalo (yellow card) 83' | Stadium: Rovaniemen keskuskenttä Attendance: 1,618; Referee: Oskari Hämäläinen |

| 15 April 2019 2 | Honka | 1 – 3 | IFK Mariehamn | Espoo |
| 18:30 EET (UTC+3) | Martín 10'; Tammilehto (yellow card) 50'; Ivanov (yellow card) 84' | Report | Ketting 39', 55'; Backaliden 60' | Stadium: Tapiolan Urheilupuisto; Attendance: 1,003; Referee: Ville Nevalainen |

| 20 April 2019 3 | KuPS | 0 – 3 | Honka | Kuopio |
| 16:00 EET (UTC+3) | Thiaw (yellow card) 67' | Report | Hakola 14'; Martín 53' (yellow card) 55'; A. Sejdiu 89' | Stadium: Savon Sanomat Areena; Attendance: 2,878; Referee: Atte Jussila |

| 25 April 2019 4 | Honka | 3 – 2 | FC Inter Turku | Espoo |
| 18:30 EET (UTC+3) | Martín 32', 58'; Tammilehto (yellow card) 72'; Ivanov 81' | Report | Ojala 40', 76'; Markkula (yellow card) 63'; Tenho (yellow card) 68'; Furuholm (yellow card) 89' | Stadium: Tapiolan Urheilupuisto; Attendance: 881; Referee: Dennis Antamo |

| 29 April 2019 5 | HIFK | 2 – 0 | Honka | Helsinki |
| 18:30 EET (UTC+3) | Mattsson 58'; J. Dunsby 79'; N. Saira (yellow card) 85'; Mäntylä (yellow card) 88' | Report | Martín (yellow card) 68'; Aalto (yellow card) 84' | Stadium: Telia 5G -areena Attendance: 1,901; Referee: Antti Munukka |

| 7 May 2019 6 | Ilves | 1 – 1 | Honka | Tampere |
| 18:30 EET (UTC+3) | Jair (yellow card) 45' (goal) 89' | Report | Aalto (yellow card) 41' (yellow-red card) 71'; Hakola 67'; Sumusalo (yellow card) 85' | Stadium: Tammelan Stadion; Attendance: 3,052; Referee: Mattias Gestranius |

| 11 May 2019 7 | Honka | 1 – 1 | VPS | Espoo |
| 15:00 EET (UTC+3) | M. Salin 14'; Kaufmann (yellow card) 45'; Saarinen (yellow card) 57'; Tammilehto (yellow card) 86' | Report | Sarr 32'; Voutilainen (yellow card) 34'; Lahti (yellow card) 68' | Stadium: Tapiolan Urheilupuisto; Referee: Oliver Reitala |

| 18 May 2019 8 | SJK | 1 – 2 | Honka | Seinäjoki |
| 16:00 EET (UTC+3) | Hatakka 20'; Yaghoubi (yellow card) 57'; Arthur (yellow card) 80' | Report | Sumusalo (yellow card) 49' (goal) 87'; Martín 60' | Stadium: OmaSP Stadion; Attendance: 2,888; Referee: Petri Viljanen |

| 27 May 2019 9 | Honka | 2 – 0 | FC Lahti | Espoo |
| 18:30 EET (UTC+3) | Silva 7'; M. Viitikko 65' (o.g.); Savage (yellow card) 74' | Report | Coubronne (yellow card) 26'; Penninkangas (yellow card) 48'; Etock (yellow card) 90+2' | Stadium: Tapiolan Urheilupuisto; Attendance: 1,431; Referee: Mattias Gestranius |

| 2 June 2019 10 | Honka | 0 – 1 | KPV | Espoo |
| 18:30 EET (UTC+3) | Tammilehto (yellow card) 24' | Report | Roiha 8'; I. Shaze (yellow card) 47'; Vidjeskog (yellow card) 90'; Kinnunen (yellow card) 90+4'; Y. Mena (yellow card) 90+4' | Stadium: Tapiolan Urheilupuisto; Attendance: 1,321; Referee: Mohammad Al Emara |

| 19 June 2019 11 | HJK | 0 – 1 | Honka | Helsinki |
| 18:30 EET (UTC+3) | Alho (yellow card) 55'; Mensah (yellow card) 74' (yellow-red card) 90+3'; Rafinha (yellow card) 78'; Zeneli (yellow card) 90+1' | Report | Hakola 79'; Perovuo (yellow card) 82'; Savage (yellow card) 88' | Stadium: Telia 5G -areena Attendance: 7,822; Referee: Jari Järvinen |

| 25 June 2019 12 | Honka | 1 – 0 | RoPS | Espoo |
| 18:30 EET (UTC+3) | Silva 79' (pen.) | Report | A. Sihvonen (yellow card) 52'; Lingman (yellow card) 82' | Stadium: Tapiolan Urheilupuisto; Attendance: 1,720; Referee: Dennis Antamo |

| 30 June 2019 13 | IFK Mariehamn | 2 – 2 | Honka | Mariehamn |
| 18:30 EET (UTC+3) | Isaksson 62' (pen.); Ekhalie 86'; Sjöroos (yellow card) 90+2' | Report | Abel Suárez 32'; Martín 44'; Baah (yellow card) 45+1' | Stadium: Wiklöf Holding Arena; Attendance: 1,100; Referee: Joni Hyytiä |

| 6 July 2019 14 | Honka | 1 – 2 | KuPS | Espoo |
| 17:00 EET (UTC+3) | Sumusalo (yellow card) 73'; Silva 84' (pen.) | Report | Saxman 23'; Niskanen 58'; Taimi (yellow card) 83' | Stadium: Tapiolan Urheilupuisto; Attendance: 1,915; Referee: Jani Laaksonen |

| 13 July 2019 15 | Honka | 3 – 0 | HIFK | Espoo |
| 13:00 EET (UTC+3) | Kaufmann 7'; Hervás 55'; Savage 84' | Report | Andberg (yellow card) 54'; Patronen (yellow card) 56'; Hänninen (yellow card) 80' | Stadium: Tapiolan Urheilupuisto; Attendance: 3,512; Referee: Antti Munukka |

| 21 July 2019 16 | FC Inter Turku | 3 – 1 | Honka | Turku |
| 17:00 EET (UTC+3) | Mastokangas 6'; Furuholm (yellow card) 44' (goal) 90'; Valenčič 59'; Paananen (yellow card) 71'; Hämäläinen (yellow card) 85' | Report | Ivanov (yellow card) 18'; Hervás (yellow card) 51'; Abel Suárez 82' | Stadium: Veritas Stadion; Attendance: 2,077; Referee: Oskari Hämäläinen |

| 27 July 2019 17 | Honka | 1 – 2 | Ilves | Espoo |
| 17:00 EET (UTC+3) | Hakola 13'; Murray (yellow card) 57'; Baah (yellow card) 66' | Report | Tomas 64'; Moussa 90+1' | Stadium: Tapiolan Urheilupuisto; Attendance: 2,807; Referee: Ville Nevalainen |

| 3 August 2019 18 | VPS | 2 – 3 | Honka | Vaasa |
| 17:00 EET (UTC+3) | Ebwelle 16', 90+3'; Auvinen (yellow card) 45'; Laatikainen (yellow card) 70' | Report | Martín 61', 68', 84'; Aalto (yellow card) 64' | Stadium: Elisa Stadion; Attendance: 1,782; Referee: Ville Nevalainen |

| 10 August 2019 19 | Honka | 0 – 0 | SJK | Espoo |
| 17:00 EET (UTC+3) | Aalto (yellow card) 39'; Hakola (yellow card) 69'; Baah (yellow card) 84' | Report | Arthur (yellow card) 45'; Mero (yellow card) 73' | Stadium: Tapiolan Urheilupuisto; Attendance: 2,109; Referee: Oskari Hämäläinen |

| 19 August 2019 20 | Lahti | 3 – 2 | Honka | Lahti |
| 18:30 EET (UTC+3) | J. Assehnoun 8'; Etock 11', 15'; Josu (yellow card) 72'; M. Viitikko (yellow card) 74'; E. Virta (yellow card) 76' | Report | Kaufmann 60'; Baah (yellow card) 69'; Martín (yellow card) 72'; Savage 82' | Stadium: Lahden Stadion; Attendance: 2,396; Referee: Mohammad Al Emara |

| 24 August 2019 21 | Honka | 0 – 1 | HJK | Espoo |
| 13:30 EET (UTC+3) | Hervás (yellow card) 61' | Report | Luiz (yellow card) 57'; O'Shaughnessy 62' | Stadium: Tapiolan Urheilupuisto; Attendance: 4,219; Referee: Mattias Gestranius |

| 31 August 2019 22 | KPV | 0 – 1 | Honka | Kokkola |
| 15:00 EET (UTC+3) | Helmke (yellow card) 77' | Report | Hakola 57'; Martín (yellow card) 61'; Hervás (yellow card) 72' | Stadium: Kokkolan Keskuskenttä; Attendance: 2,525; Referee: Joni Hyytiä |

==== Championship series ====
| 15 September 2019 1 | Ilves | 0 – 2 | Honka | Tampere |
| 18:30 EET (UTC+3) | Fofana (yellow card) 60'; Aspegren (yellow card) 78'; Tomas (yellow card) 82' | Report | Sumusalo 11'; Baah (yellow card) 41'; Martín 49' (yellow card) 69' | Stadium: Tammelan Stadion; Attendance: 2,864; Referee: Ville Nevalainen |

| 21 September 2019 2 | Honka | 3 – 1 | HJK | Espoo |
| 13:00 EET (UTC+3) | Baah (yellow card) 8'; Rasimus (yellow card) 41'; Kaufmann (yellow card) 45'; Aalto 63'; Sumusalo 66'; Savage 85' | Report | Kairinen 32' | Stadium: Tapiolan Urheilupuisto; Attendance: 3,192; Referee: Antti Munukka |

| 28 September 2019 3 | FC Inter Turku | 0 – 1 | Honka | Turku |
| 17:00 EET (UTC+3) | Furuholm (yellow card) 90+4'; Annan (yellow card) 90+6' (red card) | Report | Savage 11'; Sumusalo (yellow card) 52'; Ivanov (yellow card) 72'; Kaufmann (yellow card) 84' | Stadium: Veritas Stadion; Attendance: 3,248; Referee: Jari Järvinen |

| 6 October 2019 4 | KuPS | 1 – 1 | Honka | Kuopio |
| 16:00 EET (UTC+3) | Pennanen (yellow card) 43' (goal) 45'; Diallo (yellow card) 69'; Thiaw (yellow card) 81' | Report | Baah (yellow card) 72'; Hervás (yellow card) 76'; Ivanov 82' | Stadium: Savon Sanomat Areena; Attendance: 7,114; Referee: Mattias Gestranius |

| 19 October 2019 5 | Honka | 3 – 0 | IFK Mariehamn | Espoo |
| 15:00 EET (UTC+3) | Kandji 21'; Martín 83'; Sejdiu 90+1' | Report | | Stadium: Tapiolan Urheilupuisto |

==== European play-off final ====
30 October 2019

| IFK Mariehamn | 1 – 2 | Honka |
|---|---|---|
| Ekhalie 37' (pen.) | Report | Kandji 14'; Aalto 35'; Levänen (yellow card) 90+2' |

Wiklöf Holding Arena, Mariehamn
Attendance: 1,027
Referee: Joni Hyytiä
3 November 2019

| Honka | 1 – 0 | IFK Mariehamn |
|---|---|---|
| Ivanov (yellow card) 34'; Kaufmann 43' | Report |

Tapiolan Urheilupuisto, Espoo
Attendance: 1,910
Referee: Petri Viljanen

=== Finnish Cup ===
==== Sixth Round ====
| Team | Pld | W | D | L | GF | GA | GD | Pts |
|---|---|---|---|---|---|---|---|---|
| FC Honka | 5 | 3 | 1 | 1 | 7 | 4 | +3 | 10 |
| Inter Turku | 5 | 3 | 0 | 2 | 7 | 6 | +1 | 9 |
| FC Lahti | 5 | 3 | 0 | 2 | 6 | 7 | −1 | 9 |
| IFK Mariehamn | 5 | 2 | 2 | 1 | 7 | 4 | +3 | 8 |
| HJK | 5 | 2 | 1 | 2 | 9 | 7 | +2 | 7 |
| HIFK | 5 | 0 | 0 | 5 | 3 | 11 | −8 | 0 |

Source: Finnish Football Association

| 26 January 2019 1 | Honka | 0 – 1 | FC Lahti | Espoo |
| 14:00 EET (UTC+2) | Aalto (yellow card) 75' | Report | Josu 52' (yellow card) 87'; Lagerblom (yellow card) 70'; J-A Assehnoun (yellow card) 73'; Klinga (yellow card) 90+4' | Stadium: Esport Arena; Attendance: 250; Referee: Dennis Antamo |

| 9 February 2019 2 | HIFK | 1 – 2 | Honka | Helsinki |
| 16:00 EET (UTC+2) | K. Larsson 24'; Bäckman (yellow card) 33'; T. Palmasto (yellow card) 35'; Halme (yellow card) 42' | Report | Arlind Sejdiu 11', 30' | Stadium: Talin Halli; Attendance: 285; Referee: Mattias Gestranius |

| 19 February 2019 3 | HJK | 2 – 3 | Honka | Helsinki |
| 17:00 EET (UTC+2) | Riski 44'; Vahtera 55' | Report | Tammilehto (yellow card) 60'; Martín 78'; Hakola 82'; Ivanov 89' | Stadium: Tali halli tekonurmi Attendance: 553; Referee: Antti Munukka |

| 9 February 2019 4 | Honka | 0 – 0 | IFK Mariehamn | Espoo |
| 13:00 EET (UTC+2) | | Report | | Stadium: Esport Arena; Attendance: 250; Referee: Joni Hyytiä |

| 23 February 2019 5 | Honka | 2 – 0 | FC Inter Turku | Espoo |
| 14:00 EET (UTC+2) | Perovuo (yellow card) 34'; Baah (yellow card) 53'; Aalto (yellow card) 59'; Hakola 64'; Tammilehto 90+2' | Report | Muñiz (yellow card) 39' (yellow-red card) 63'; Hämäläinen (yellow card) 77' | Stadium: Esport Arena; Attendance: 250; Referee: Dennis Antamo |

==== Knockout stages ====
| 16 March 2019 Last 16 | AC Oulu | 0 – 1 | Honka | Oulu |
| 15:30 EET (UTC+2) | Ramadingaye (yellow card) 51' | Report | Rasimus (yellow card) 38' (yellow-red card) 42'; Kaufmann (yellow card) 41'; Baah 85' | Stadium: Heinäpään halli Attendance: 502; Referee: Jani Laaksonen |

| 30 March 2019 Last 8 | FC Honka | 1 – 1 (a.e.t.) (3 – 4 p) | Ilves | Espoo |
| 14:00 EET (UTC+2) | Hervás (yellow card) 54'; Baah 85'; Kaufmann (yellow card) 118' | Report | Addy (yellow card) 12'; Tendeng 89' (yellow card) 36'; Tomas (yellow card) 75' | Stadium: Tapiolan Tekonurmi; Attendance: 300; Referee: Antti Munukka |
| | Penalties |
| | Kaufmann (penalty missed); Martín (penalty scored); Ivanov (penalty scored); Hervás (penalty missed); Baah (penalty scored) | | (penalty missed) Tendeng; (penalty scored) Mettälä; (penalty scored) E. Raittinen; (penalty scored) Jair; (penalty scored) Tomas |

== Squad statistics ==
As of Match played 19 October 2019

=== Appearances and goals ===
| No. | Pos | Nat | Player | Total | | Veikkausliiga | | Finnish Cup | |
| No. | Pos | Nat | Player | Apps | Goals | Apps | Goals | Apps | Goals |
|---|---|---|---|---|---|---|---|---|---|
| 3 | DF | (Ghana) GHA | Gideon Baah | 21 | 3 | 17 | 1 | 3+1 | 2 |
| 4 | DF | (Finland) FIN | Robert Ivanov | 34 | 3 | 26+1 | 2 | 7 | 1 |
| 5 | DF | (Finland) FIN | Henri Aalto | 28 | 1 | 20+1 | 1 | 7 | 0 |
| 7 | DF | (Finland) FIN | Jonas Levänen | 3 | 0 | 1+2 | 0 | 0 | 0 |
| 8 | DF | (Spain) ESP | Javi Hervás | 24 | 1 | 22+1 | 1 | 1 | 0 |
| 10 | MF | (Brazil) BRA | Lucas Kaufmann | 33 | 2 | 26 | 2 | 6+1 | 0 |
| 11 | MF | (Finland) FIN | Juha Hakola | 31 | 7 | 23+1 | 5 | 7 | 2 |
| 12 | GK | (Finland) FIN | Rasmus Leislahti | 0 | 0 | 0 | 0 | 0 | 0 |
| 13 | GK | (United States) USA | Tim Murray | 34 | 0 | 27 | 0 | 7 | 0 |
| 14 | FW | (Spain) ESP | Borjas Martín | 33 | 13 | 26 | 12 | 7 | 1 |
| 15 | FW | (Finland) FIN | Martin Salin | 13 | 1 | 2+6 | 1 | 0+5 | 0 |
| 16 | DF | (Finland) FIN | Konsta Rasimus | 26 | 0 | 19+1 | 0 | 6 | 0 |
| 18 | FW | (Finland) FIN | Elmo Heinonen | 1 | 0 | 1 | 0 | 0 | 0 |
| 19 | FW | (Finland) FIN | Arlind Sejdiu | 23 | 4 | 2+14 | 2 | 5+2 | 2 |
| 20 | MF | (Netherlands) NED | Erik Bakker | 1 | 0 | 1 | 0 | 0 | 0 |
| 21 | MF | (Finland) FIN | Joel Perovuo | 26 | 0 | 10+11 | 0 | 2+3 | 0 |
| 22 | DF | (Finland) FIN | Joona Rahikka | 2 | 0 | 0+1 | 0 | 0+1 | 0 |
| 23 | DF | (Finland) FIN | Mikko Sumusalo | 27 | 3 | 22 | 3 | 4+1 | 0 |
| 24 | DF | (Ghana) GHA | Nasiru Banahene | 3 | 0 | 0+3 | 0 | 0 | 0 |
| 28 | DF | (Finland) FIN | Tommi Saarinen | 12 | 0 | 7+2 | 0 | 2+1 | 0 |
| 33 | MF | (Finland) FIN | Duarte Tammilehto | 21 | 1 | 15 | 0 | 5+1 | 1 |
| 45 | FW | (Finland) FIN | Robbie Azodo | 4 | 0 | 0+1 | 0 | 0+3 | 0 |
| 68 | MF | (Finland) FIN | Armend Kabashi | 5 | 0 | 1+4 | 0 | 0 | 0 |
| 77 | MF | (Finland) FIN | Doni Arifi | 4 | 0 | 0 | 0 | 0+4 | 0 |
| 80 | FW | (The Gambia) GAM | Demba Savage | 27 | 4 | 12+13 | 4 | 0+2 | 0 |
| 99 | FW | (Senegal) SEN | Macoumba Kandji | 2 | 1 | 1+1 | 1 | 0 | 0 |
Players who left Honka during the season:
| 6 | MF | (Spain) ESP | Abel Suárez | 18 | 2 | 5+7 | 2 | 5+1 | 0 |
| 9 | FW | (Cameroon) CMR | Gaël Etock | 3 | 0 | 0 | 0 | 2+1 | 0 |
| 20 | FW | (Mexico) MEX | Luis Silva | 14 | 3 | 10+3 | 3 | 1 | 0 |
| 24 | MF | (Finland) FIN | Saku Heiskanen | 1 | 0 | 0 | 0 | 0+1 | 0 |

=== Goal scorers ===
| Place | Position | Nation | Number | Name | Veikkausliiga | Finnish Cup | Total |
|---|---|---|---|---|---|---|---|
| 1 | MF | (Spain) | 14 | Borjas Martín | 12 | 1 | 13 |
| 2 | MF | (Finland) | 11 | Juha Hakola | 5 | 2 | 7 |
| 3 | FW | (Finland) | 19 | Arlind Sejdiu | 2 | 2 | 4 |
| 3 | FW | (The Gambia) | 23 | Demba Savage | 4 | 0 | 4 |
| 5 | FW | (Mexico) | 20 | Luis Silva | 3 | 0 | 3 |
| 5 | DF | (Ghana) | 3 | Gideon Baah | 1 | 2 | 3 |
| 5 | DF | (Finland) | 23 | Mikko Sumusalo | 3 | 0 | 3 |
| 5 | DF | (Finland) | 4 | Robert Ivanov | 2 | 1 | 3 |
| 9 | MF | (Spain) | 6 | Abel Suárez | 2 | 0 | 2 |
| 9 | MF | (Brazil) | 10 | Lucas Kaufmann | 2 | 0 | 2 |
| 11 | FW | (Senegal) | 99 | Macoumba Kandji | 1 | 0 | 1 |
| 11 | FW | (Finland) | 93 | Martin Salin | 1 | 0 | 1 |
| 11 | MF | (Finland) | 33 | Duarte Tammilehto | 0 | 1 | 1 |
| 11 | DF | (Finland) | 5 | Henri Aalto | 1 | 0 | 1 |
| 11 | MF | (Spain) | 8 | Javi Hervás | 1 | 0 | 1 |
| | | | | Own goal | 1 | 0 | 1 |
| TOTALS | | | | | 41 | 9 | 50 |

=== Disciplinary record ===
| Number | Nation | Position | Name | Veikkausliiga | | Finnish Cup | | Total | |
| Number | Nation | Position | Name | Booked | Sent off (straight red) | Booked | Sent off (straight red) | Booked | Sent off (straight red) |
| 3 | (Ghana) | DF | Gideon Baah | 7 | 0 | 1 | 0 | 8 | 0 |
| 4 | (Finland) | DF | Robert Ivanov | 3 | 0 | 0 | 0 | 3 | 0 |
| 5 | (Finland) | DF | Henri Aalto | 5 | 1 | 2 | 0 | 7 | 1 |
| 8 | (Spain) | MF | Javi Hervás | 4 | 0 | 0 | 0 | 4 | 0 |
| 10 | (Brazil) | MF | Lucas Kaufmann | 3 | 0 | 2 | 0 | 5 | 0 |
| 11 | (Finland) | MF | Juha Hakola | 1 | 0 | 0 | 0 | 1 | 0 |
| 13 | (United States) | GK | Tim Murray | 1 | 0 | 0 | 0 | 1 | 0 |
| 14 | (Spain) | MF | Borjas Martín | 5 | 0 | 1 | 0 | 6 | 0 |
| 16 | (Finland) | DF | Konsta Rasimus | 1 | 0 | 2 | 1 | 3 | 1 |
| 20 | (Mexico) | FW | Luis Silva | 1 | 0 | 0 | 0 | 1 | 0 |
| 21 | (Finland) | MF | Joel Perovuo | 1 | 0 | 1 | 0 | 2 | 0 |
| 23 | (Finland) | DF | Mikko Sumusalo | 5 | 0 | 0 | 0 | 5 | 0 |
| 28 | (Finland) | DF | Tommi Saarinen | 1 | 0 | 0 | 0 | 1 | 0 |
| 33 | (Finland) | MF | Duarte Tammilehto | 4 | 0 | 1 | 0 | 5 | 0 |
| 80 | (The Gambia) | FW | Demba Savage | 2 | 0 | 0 | 0 | 2 | 0 |
| TOTALS | | | | 44 | 1 | 10 | 1 | 54 | 2 |
