= Mikko Sumusalo =

Finnish footballer (born 1990)

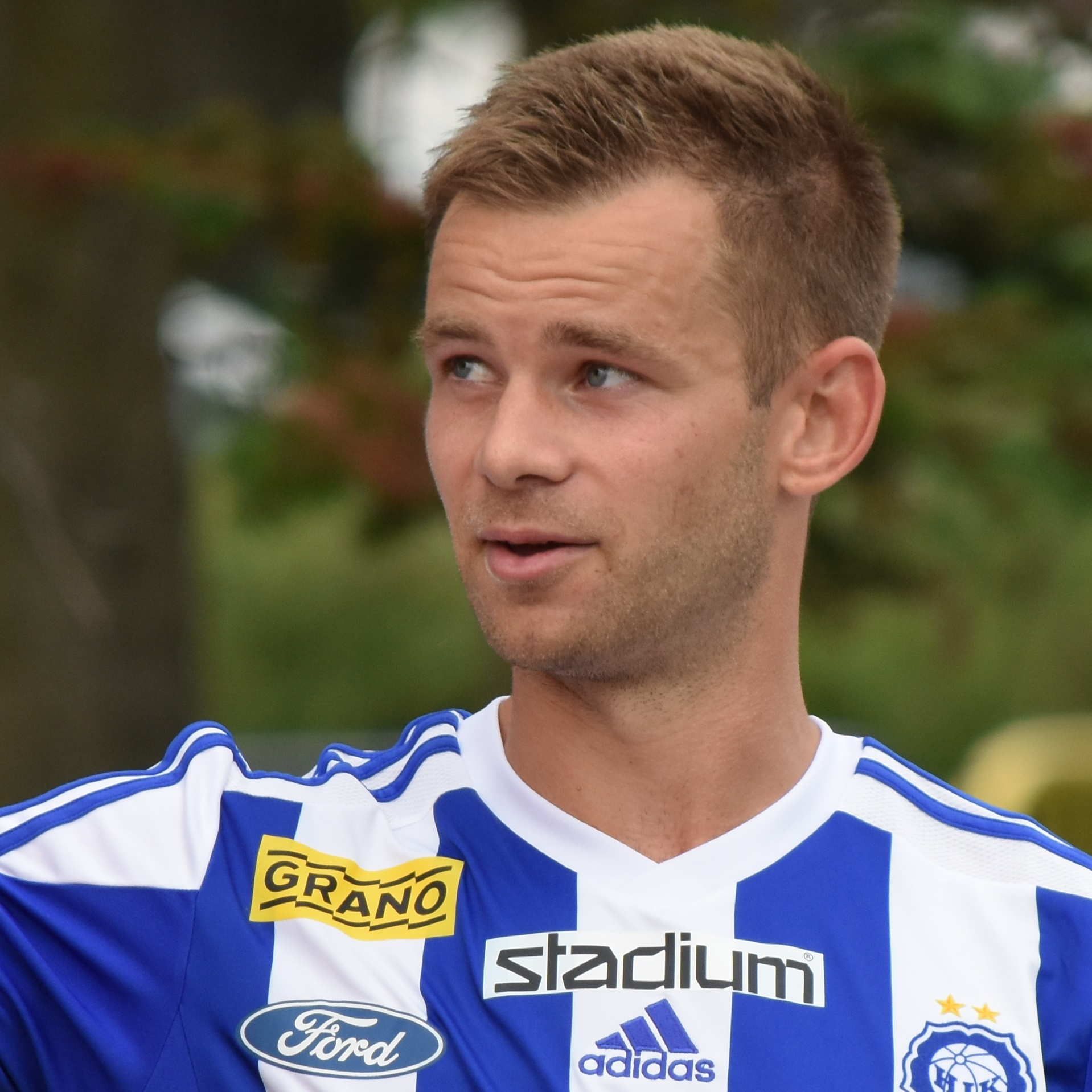
- Sumusalo with HJK in 2018.

Personal information
- Date of birth: 12 March 1990 (age 36)
- Place of birth: Porvoo, Finland
- Height: 1.76 m (5 ft 9 1/2 in)
- Position: Left back

Team information
- Current team: KTP
- Number: 21

Youth career
- 1997−1999: Futura
- 1999−2009: HJK

Senior career*
Years	Team	Apps	(Gls)
2007−2010	Klubi 04	20	(1)
2009−2013	HJK	80	(3)
2014−2016	RB Leipzig	2	(0)
2015	→ Hansa Rostock (loan)	14	(0)
2015−2016	RB Leipzig II	10	(0)
2016−2017	Rot-Weiß Erfurt	21	(0)
2018	Chemnitzer FC	16	(1)
2018	HJK	7	(0)
2019	Honka	23	(3)
2020–2023	IFK Mariehamn	79	(4)
2024–	KTP	40	(1)

International career^{‡}
2004–2005	Finland U15	6	(1)
2005–2006	Finland U16	18	(0)
2006–2007	Finland U17	6	(0)
2007–2008	Finland U18	19	(1)
2009	Finland U19	6	(0)
2009–2012	Finland U21	21	(1)
2012–2017	Finland	7	(1)
Medal record
Klubi-04
First place	Finnish League Division 2 Group A	2008
HJK Helsinki
First place	Veikkausliiga	2010
Second place	Finnish Cup	2010
First place	Veikkausliiga	2011
First place	Finnish Cup	2011
Second place	Finnish League Cup	2012
First place	Veikkausliiga	2012
First place	Veikkausliiga	2013
- * Club domestic league appearances and goals as of 19 November 2025 ‡ National team caps and goals as of 13 January 2017

Mikko Sumusalo (born 12 March 1990) is a Finnish professional footballer who plays as a defender and captains Finnish Ykkösliiga club KTP. Sumusalo was born in Porvoo, Finland. Sumusalo began his senior club career playing for Klubi-04, before making his league debut for HJK at age 19 in 2009. He can play either leftback or wingback.

Sumusalo made his international debut for Finland in January 2012, at the age of 21.

== Club career ==
=== HJK Helsinki ===
After starting his footballing career at his local FC Futura, the nine-year-old defender moved to HJK in 1999. After coming through the junior levels and the reserves, Sumusalo made his first division debut on 25 May 2009 against FC Lahti. Since then he made a total of 25 league appearances and some appearances in both Champions League qualifiers and Europa League qualifiers for HJK.

=== RB Leipzig ===
In January 2014, after the expiration of his contract with HJK, Sumusalo moved to Germany and joined 3. Liga side RB Leipzig signing until 2016. However, also due injuries, Sumusalo wasn't able to establish himself, earning only two caps until the end of the 2013−14 season. This situation lasted also for the first leg of the following campaign, especially since Leipzig had been promoted to the 2. Bundesliga and signed several high acclaimed players. To gain match practice, he was therefore loaned to 3. Liga club Hansa Rostock until the end of the 2014−15 season.

=== Rot-Weiß Erfurt and Chemnitzer FC ===
In June 2016 Sumusalo transferred from RB Leipzig to Rot-Weiß Erfurt. After only one year with 21 deployments in the league, the contract was dissolved. After a longer-term of Unemployment, the Chemnitzer FC took hin on January 17, 2018, until June 30 with an option to renewal under contract. However, he was discharged at the end of the season.

=== Back to Finland ===
For the 2018 season, Mikko Sumusalo returned to HJK Helsinki to play in the highest Finnish football league.

On 15 January 2019, Sumusalo signed for FC Honka.

After a four-year stint with IFK Mariehamn in Veikkausliiga, Sumusalo moved to Kotka and signed with Kotkan Työväen Palloilijat (KTP) for the 2024 Ykkösliiga season in Finnish second-tier.

== International career ==
Sumusalo made his debut for Finland U21 in 2009 and was a regular member ever since. He made his senior debut on 22 January 2012 in a friendly against Trinidad and Tobago. In January 2013 he scored his first goal for the national team on the 5th minute in a match against Thailand.

== Career statistics ==
=== Club ===
As of 10 March 2025

Appearances and goals by club, season and competition
Club	Season	League			Cup (Note: Includes Suomen Cup)		League cup (Note: Includes Finnish League Cup, Mecklenburg-Vorpommern Cup, Thuringian Cup and Ykkösliigacup)		Europe		Total	
Club	Season	Division	Apps	Goals	Apps	Goals	Apps	Goals	Apps	Goals	Apps	Goals
Klubi 04	2007	Ykkönen	1	0	–		–		–		1	0
Klubi 04	2008	Kakkonen	0	0	–		–		–		0	0
Klubi 04	2009	Ykkönen	19	1	–		–		–		19	1
Klubi 04	2010	Ykkönen	2	0	–		–		–		2	05
Klubi 04	Total		22	1	0	0	0	0	0	0	22	1
HJK	2009	Veikkausliiga	1	0	0	0	3	1	0	0	4	1
HJK	2010	Veikkausliiga	14	0	3	0	0	0	1 (Note: Appearance(s) in UEFA Champions League and UEFA Europa League)	0	18	0
HJK	2011	Veikkausliiga	17	1	1	0	1	0	5	0	24	1
HJK	2012	Veikkausliiga	20	1	2	0	7	0	5	0	34	1
HJK	2013	Veikkausliiga	27	1	2	0	5	0	2 (Note: Appearances in UEFA Champions League)	0	36	1
HJK	Total		79	3	8	0	16	1	13	0	116	4
RB Leipzig	2013–14	3. Liga	2	0	0	0	–		–		2	0
RB Leipzig	2014–15	2. Bundesliga	0	0	0	0	–		–		0	0
RB Leipzig	Total		2	0	0	0	0	0	0	0	2	0
RB Leipzig II	2013–14	Sachsenliga	2	0	–		–		–		2	0
RB Leipzig II	2014–15	NOFV-Oberliga Süd	2	0	–		–		–		2	0
RB Leipzig II	2015–16	Regionalliga Nordost	6	0	–		–		–		6	0
RB Leipzig II	Total		10	0	0	0	0	0	0	0	10	0
Hansa Rostock (loan)	2014–15	3. Liga	14	0	0	0	2	0	–		16	0
Rot-Weiß Erfurt	2016–17	3. Liga	21	0	0	0	2	0	–		23	0
Chemnitzer FC	2017–18	3. Liga	16	1	0	0	–		–		16	1
HJK	2018	Veikkausliiga	7	0	0	0	–		4	0	11	0
Honka	2019	Veikkausliiga	23	3	5	0	–		–		28	3
IFK Mariehamn	2020	Veikkausliiga	20	0	0	0	–		–		20	0
IFK Mariehamn	2021	Veikkausliiga	18	0	2	0	–		–		20	0
IFK Mariehamn	2022	Veikkausliiga	17	1	1	0	3	0	–		21	1
IFK Mariehamn	2023	Veikkausliiga	24	3	3	0	5	0	–		32	3
IFK Mariehamn	Total		79	4	6	0	8	0	0	0	93	4
KTP	2024	Ykkösliiga	21	0	0	0	2	1	–		23	1
KTP	2025	Veikkausliiga	0	0	0	0	5	0	–		5	0
KTP	Total		21	0	0	0	7	1	0	0	28	1
Career total			294	13	19	0	35	2	17	0	365	15

=== International ===
Statistics accurate as of matches played on 13 January 2017

National team	Year	Apps	Goals
Finland
Finland	2012	1	0
Finland	2013	3	1
Finland	2014	0	0
Finland	2015	1	0
Finland	2016	0	0
Finland	2017	2	0
Total		7	1

=== International goals ===
#	Date	Location	Opponent	Result	Competition
1.	23 January 2013	Chiang Mai, Thailand	Thailand	3−1	2013 King's Cup

== Honours and achievements ==
Klubi-04

- Finnish League Division 2 Group A: 2008

HJK Helsinki

- Finnish championship: 2009, 2010, 2011, 2012, 2013, 2018
- Finnish Cup: 2011

KTP

- Ykkösliiga: 2024
