= Elmo Heinonen =

Finnish footballer (born 1997)

Personal information
- Date of birth: 2 April 1997 (age 29)
- Place of birth: Salo, Finland
- Height: 1.88 m (6 ft 2 in)
- Position: Forward

Senior career*
Years	Team	Apps	(Gls)
2013–2017	SalPa	59	(12)
2017	EIF	0	(0)
2017–2018	SalPa	33	(17)
2019–2021	Honka	8	(0)
2020–2021	→ TPS (loan)	23	(3)
2022–2023	SalPa	40	(18)
- * Club domestic league appearances and goals as of 27 November 2023

Elmo Heinonen (born 2 April 1997) is a Finnish professional footballer who plays as a forward.

== Club career ==
On 29 November 2021, he agreed to return to his first club Salon Palloilijat (SalPa).

== Career statistics ==
As of 26 July 2024

Club	Season	League			Finnish Cup		Continental		Other		Total	
Club	Season	Division	Apps	Goals	Apps	Goals	Apps	Goals	Apps	Goals	Apps	Goals
SalPa	2013	Kakkonen	7	0	—		—		—		7	0
SalPa	2014	Kakkonen	19	1	—		—		—		19	1
SalPa	2015	Kakkonen	22	5	—		—		—		22	5
SalPa	2016	Kakkonen	11	6	—		—		—		11	6
SalPa	Total		59	12	—		—		—		59	12
EIF	2017	Ykkönen	—		2	0	—		—		2	0
SalPa	2017	Kakkonen	10	1	—		—		—		10	1
SalPa	2018	Kakkonen	10	5	—		—		—		10	5
SalPa	2019	Kakkonen	13	11	—		—		—		13	11
SalPa	Total		33	17	—		—		—		33	17
Honka	2019	Veikkausliiga	1	0	—		—		—		1	0
Honka	2020	Veikkausliiga	7	0	3	0	0	0	—		10	0
Honka	Total		8	0	3	0	0	0	—		11	0
Honka Akatemia	2020	Kakkonen	2	0	—		—		—		2	0
TPS (loan)	2020	Veikkausliiga	3	0	—		—		1 (Note: Appearance(s) in Promotion/Relegation play-offs)	0	4	0
TPS (loan)	2021	Ykkönen	20	3	3	1	—		—		23	4
TPS (loan)	Total		23	3	3	1	—		1	0	27	4
SalPa	2022	Kakkonen	23	18	2	1	—		—		25	19
SalPa	2023	Ykkönen	17	0	3	1	—		4 (Note: Includes Ykkönen Cup)	0	24	1
SalPa	Total		40	18	5	2	—		4	0	49	20
Career Total			165	50	13	3	0	0	5	0	183	53
