= Diogo Tomás =

Finnish footballer (born 1997)

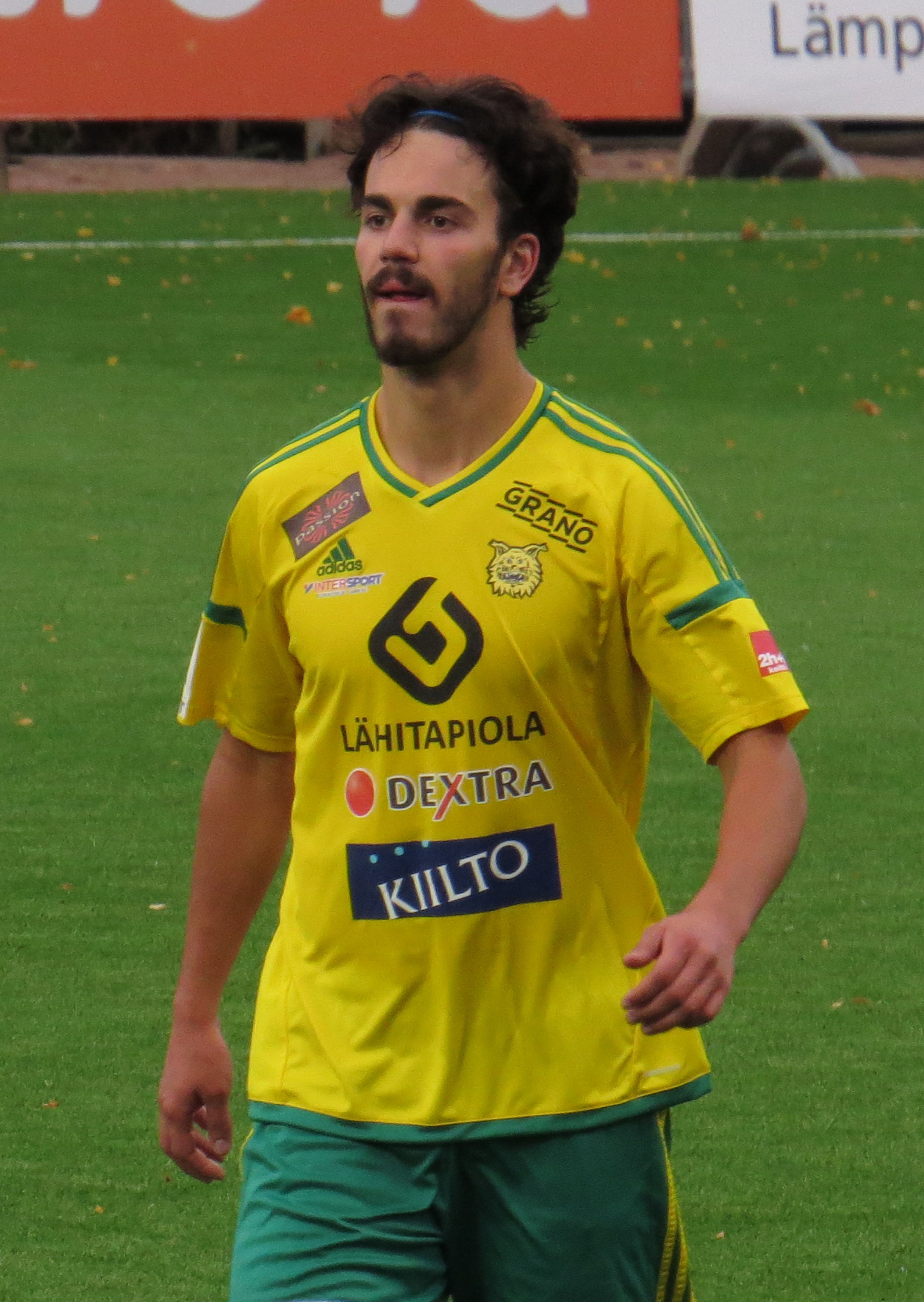
- Tomás with Ilves in 2015

Personal information
- Full name: Diogo Alberto Soares Tomás
- Date of birth: 31 July 1997 (age 29)
- Place of birth: Oulu, Finland
- Height: 1.93 m (6 ft 4 in)
- Position: Centre-back

Team information
- Current team: AIK
- Number: 33

Youth career
- –2015: Ilves

Senior career*
Years	Team	Apps	(Gls)
2015–2016	Ilves	4	(0)
2016	→ MP (loan)	5	(0)
2017	Haka	20	(1)
2018–2020	Ilves	64	(5)
2021–2022	KuPS	49	(6)
2023	Odd	24	(1)
2023	→ Odd 2	4	(0)
2024	HJK	17	(2)
2024–2026	ADO Den Haag	58	(7)
2026–	AIK	3	(1)

International career
2016	Finland U19	2	(0)
2022–2023	Finland	4	(0)
- * Club domestic league appearances and goals as of 18 October 2026

Diogo Alberto Soares Tomás (European Portuguese pronunciation: [diˈɔɣu aɫˈβɛɾtu suˈaɾɨʃ tuˈmaʃ]; born 31 July 1997) is a Finnish professional footballer who plays as a centre-back for Allsvenskan club AIK.

== Early and personal life ==
Tomás was born in Oulu to doctor parents. His Finnish mother comes from Kouvola and his father is Portuguese. Tomás was raised in Annala neighbourhood of Tampere. His older brother Fausto is also a doctor.

== Club career ==
=== Early career ===
Tomás started football in the youth sector of local club Ilves in Tampere. After debuting in top-tier Veikkausliiga with Ilves first team in 2015, he spent a brief loan spell with Mikkelin Palloilijat in the third-tier Kakkonen in early 2016. He made a further three appearances in the league after returning to Ilves, and joined FC Haka for the 2017 Ykkönen season, in Finnish second tier.

=== Ilves ===
After a season with Haka, Tomás returned to his former club Ilves at the start of 2018 Veikkausliiga season, and with Ilves he established himself in the league. Eventually, he spent three seasons with the club and became a favourite of supporters. He was selected the Player of the Year in 2018 by the Tampere district of the Finnish FA, Tomás won the 2019 Finnish Cup title with Ilves, and represented the club twice in UEFA Europa League qualifiers.

=== KuPS ===
In early 2021, he joined fellow Veikkausliiga club KuPS on a two-year deal. During his time with KuPS, the club won two Finnish Cup titles, and finished as the league runner-up twice. Tomas was named in the Veikkausliiga Team of the Year in 2021. He also totalled ten appearances and scored one goal for KuPS in the UEFA Europa Conference League qualifiers.

=== Odd ===
After playing for KuPS, Tomás signed for Eliteserien club Odds Ballklubb (Odd) in March 2023 on a one-year deal. While in Norway, Tomas lived temporarily in a caravan in a forest, and became a fan favourite cult figure for his playing style and his personal hair style. After the last match of the season, he donated parts of his mullet hair to the supporters.

=== HJK ===
Following the expiration of his contract with Odd, Tomás refused a contract extension and returned to Finland after signing with reigning champions HJK Helsinki for the 2024 Veikkausliiga season. He debuted with his new club in the league on 11 April 2024, as a substitute to Joona Toivio, in a 4–0 home win over FC Lahti. On 29 August, in the 2nd leg of the UEFA Conference League qualifying play-off round, Tomas scored a goal against KÍ Klaksvík, helping HJK to win the pair 4–3 on aggregate and to qualify for the league phase.

=== ADO Den Haag ===
On 2 September 2024, Tomás signed with Eerste Divisie club ADO Den Haag on a two-year deal for an undisclosed fee. On 31 January 2025, in the club's 120th anniversary match, Tomas scored his first goal for ADO Den Haag, helping his team to defeat FC Eindhoven 2–1 at the Bingoal Stadium. On 18 March 2026, after ADO had secured the promotion back to Eredivisie, six games prior to the regular season ending, Tomas gave an interview to Dutch reporter while wearing sunglasses, sipping beer, smoking cigar and referring to himself in third person. A video of the interview went viral.

=== AIK ===
On 1 August 2026 Tomás signed with Swedish club AIK.

== International career ==
Tomas plays for the Finland national team, having previously played for them at youth level.

== Personal life ==
Tomas practices yoga and meditates frequently. Early in his career, he also played futsal for Ilves FS.

== Career statistics ==
=== Club ===
As of 25 April 2026

Appearances and goals by club, season and competition
Club	Season	League			National cup (Note: Includes Suomen Cup, Norwegian Cup and KNVB Cup)		League cup (Note: Includes Finnish League Cup)		Europe		Other		Total	
Club	Season	Division	Apps	Goals	Apps	Goals	Apps	Goals	Apps	Goals	Apps	Goals	Apps	Goals
Ilves	2015	Veikkausliiga	1	0	0	0	0	0	—		—		1	0
Ilves	2016	Veikkausliiga	3	0	0	0	3	0	—		—		6	0
Ilves	Total		4	0	0	0	3	0	0	0	0	0	7	0
Ilves II	2016	Kolmonen	6	0	—		—		—		—		6	0
MP (loan)	2016	Kakkonen	5	0	0	0	—		—		—		5	0
Haka	2017	Ykkönen	20	1	0	0	—		—		—		20	1
Pallo-Sepot 44 (loan)	2017	Kolmonen	2	0	—		—		—		—		2	0
Ilves	2018	Veikkausliiga	27	1	4	0	—		1 (Note: Appearance(s) in UEFA Europa League)	0	—		32	1
Ilves	2019	Veikkausliiga	17	1	5	2	—		—		—		22	3
Ilves	2020	Veikkausliiga	20	3	7	0	—		1	0	—		28	3
Ilves	Total		64	5	16	2	0	0	0	0	1	0	82	7
KuPS	2021	Veikkausliiga	23	5	6	2	—		5 (Note: Appearance(s) in UEFA Europa Conference League)	1	—		34	8
KuPS	2022	Veikkausliiga	26	1	5	0	1	0	5	0	—		37	1
KuPS	Total		49	6	11	2	1	0	10	1	0	0	71	9
Odd	2023	Eliteserien	24	1	4	1	—		—		—		28	2
Odd 2	2023	3. divisjon	4	0	—		—		—		—		4	0
HJK	2024	Veikkausliiga	17	2	2	0	0	0	5 (Note: One appearance in UEFA Champions League, four appearances and one goal in UEFA Conference League)	1	—		24	3
ADO Den Haag	2024–25	Eerste Divisie	32	2	1	0	—		—		2 (Note: Appearances in Eredivisie promotion play-offs)	0	35	2
ADO Den Haag	2025–26	Eerste Divisie	26	5	1	0	—		—		—		27	5
ADO Den Haag	Total		58	7	2	0	0	0	0	0	2	0	62	7
AIK	2026	Allsvenskan	0	0	0	0	—		—		—		0	0
Career total			244	22	35	5	4	0	17	2	2	0	302	29

=== International ===
Appearances and goals by national team and year
National team	Year	Apps	Goals
Finland
Finland	2022	2	0
Finland	2023	2	0
Total		4	0

== Honours ==
Ilves

- Finnish Cup: 2019

KuPS

- Finnish Cup: 2021, 2022
- Veikkausliiga runner-up: 2021, 2022

ADO Den Haag

- Eerste Divisie: 2025–26

Individual

- Veikkausliiga Team of the Year: 2021
- Finnish FA Tampere Player of the Year: 2018
