= Arlind Sejdiu =

Finnish-Kosovan footballer (born 2001)

Personal information
- Date of birth: 11 August 2001 (age 25)
- Place of birth: Oulu, Finland
- Height: 1.75 m (5 ft 9 in)
- Position: Left winger

Team information
- Current team: Milsami Orhei

Youth career
- –2017: Honka

Senior career*
Years	Team	Apps	(Gls)
2017–2020	Honka II	44	(9)
2017–2020	Honka	26	(2)
2020–2022	Lahti	43	(2)
2023	Inter Turku II	7	(12)
2023	Inter Turku	10	(0)
2024–2025	Haka	51	(5)
2026	Ferizaj	10	(0)
2026–	Milsami Orhei	3	(1)

International career^{‡}
- Finland U17
2019	Finland U18	3	(1)
2019	Finland U19	2	(0)
2021–2022	Kosovo U21	2	(1)
- * Club domestic league appearances and goals as of 22 June 2026 ‡ National team caps and goals as of 25 March 2022

Arlind Sejdiu (born 11 August 2001) is a professional footballer who plays as a left winger for Milsami Orhei. Born and raised in Finland, Sejdiu represented both Finland and Kosovo at youth international level.

== Club career ==
On 7 September 2020, Sejdiu joined Veikkausliiga side Lahti. Two days later, he made his debut in a 2–2 away draw against IFK Mariehamn after coming on as a substitute at 71st minute in place of Eemeli Virta.

On 15 November 2022, Sejdiu signed a contract with Inter Turku for the 2023 and 2024 seasons.

On 20 February 2024, Sejdiu signed a one-year deal with Haka.

== International career ==
Sejdiu represented Finland at youth international level, part of the under-17, under-18, and under-19 teams.

On 3 November 2021, he received a call-up from Kosovo national under-21 team for the 2023 UEFA European Under-21 Championship qualification match against Albania U21. His debut with Kosovo under-21 came thirteen days later after coming on as a substitute at 62nd minute in place of Valmir Veliu, scoring his side's second goal during a 2–1 home win.

== Personal life ==
Sejdiu was born in Oulu, Finland to Kosovo Albanian parents from Mitrovica, he is the nephew of Kosovan football coach and former player Gani Sejdiu.

== Career statistics ==
As of 11 March 2025

Appearances and goals by club, season and competition
Club	Season	League			Cup (Note: Includes Suomen Cup)		League cup (Note: Includes Finnish League Cup)		Europe		Total	
Club	Season	Division	Apps	Goals	Apps	Goals	Apps	Goals	Apps	Goals	Apps	Goals
Honka Akatemia	2017	Kolmonen	12	2	—		—		3 (Note: Appearances in UEFA Regions' Cup)	0	15	2
Honka Akatemia	2018	Kakkonen	18	3	1	1	—		—		19	4
Honka Akatemia	2019	Kakkonen	12	3	—		—		—		12	3
Honka Akatemia	2020	Kakkonen	2	1	—		—		—		2	1
Honka Akatemia	Total		44	9	1	1	0	0	3	0	48	10
Honka	2017	Ykkönen	0	0	1	0	—		—		1	0
Honka	2018	Veikkausliiga	0	0	0	0	—		—		0	0
Honka	2019	Veikkausliiga	17	2	7	2	—		—		24	4
Honka	2020	Veikkausliiga	9	0	5	0	—		1 (Note: Appearance(s) in UEFA Europa League)	0	15	0
Honka	Total		26	2	13	2	0	0	1	0	40	4
Lahti	2020	Veikkausliiga	4	0	—		—		—		4	0
Lahti	2021	Veikkausliiga	17	1	3	1	—		—		20	2
Lahti	2022	Veikkausliiga	22	1	6	2	3	0	—		30	3
Lahti	Total		43	2	9	3	3	0	0	0	55	5
Inter Turku	2023	Veikkausliiga	10	0	3	1	6	2	—		19	3
Inter Turku II	2023	Kolmonen	7	12	—		—		—		7	12
Haka	2024	Veikkausliiga	29	4	5	2	2	0	—		36	6
Haka	2025	Veikkausliiga	0	0	0	0	5	2	—		5	2
Haka	Total		29	4	5	2	7	2	0	0	41	8
Career total			159	29	31	9	16	4	4	0	210	42
