= Lucas Kaufmann =

Brazilian footballer (born 1991)

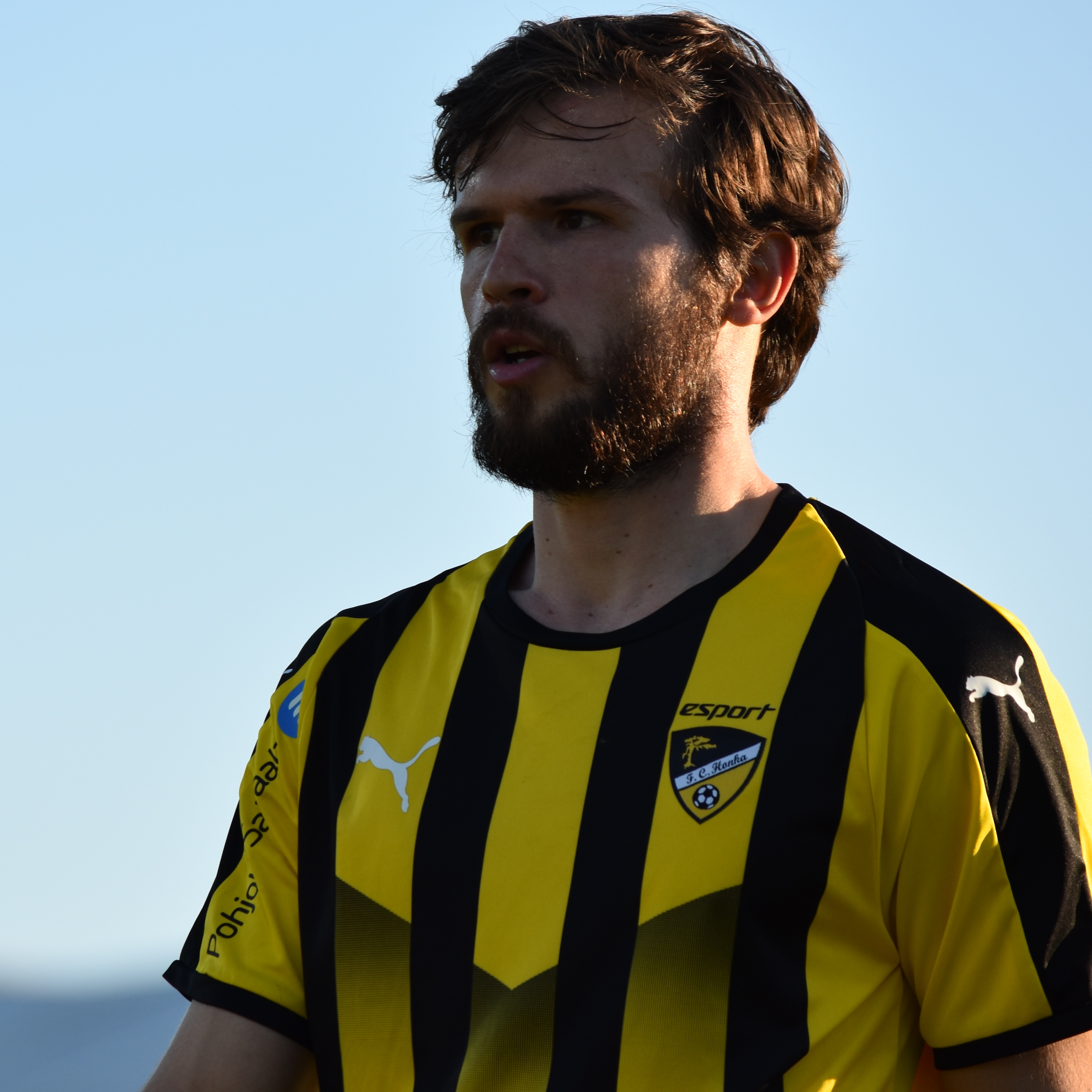
- Kaufmann with Honka in 2018

Personal information
- Full name: Lucas Paz Forsten-Kaufmann
- Date of birth: 26 March 1991 (age 35)
- Place of birth: Porto Alegre, Brazil
- Height: 1.70 m (5 ft 7 in)
- Position: Midfielder

Team information
- Current team: EIF
- Number: 10

Youth career
- 1998–2006: Internacional
- 2006: Cerâmica
- 2007–2009: São José-PA

Senior career*
Years	Team	Apps	(Gls)
2010	Mafra		
2011–2012	PK Keski-Uusimaa	36	(20)
2012	→ PK-35 Vantaa (loan)	3	(0)
2013–2014	Al-Shabab		
2014	PK Keski-Uusimaa	15	(6)
2014–2015	EIF	36	(9)
2016	PK-35 Vantaa	24	(2)
2016	EIF	7	(0)
2017	HJK	0	(0)
2017–2023	Honka	167	(21)
2023–	EIF	57	(5)
- * Club domestic league appearances and goals as of 1 November 2026

Lucas Paz Forsten-Kaufmann (born 26 March 1991) is a Brazilian professional footballer for Finnish club EIF.

== Club career ==
=== Club ===
In November 2015, Kaufmann signed for newly promoted Veikkausliiga side PK-35 Vantaa. After being on trial with HJK, Kaufmann signed a three-year contract with FC Honka on 28 February 2017. In February 2018 Kaufmann suffered a LCL rupture and had to undergo surgery, but he recovered quickly in 4 months just on time for the second home game of the Veikkausliiga-season. Kaufmann was selected to the Veikkausliiga 'Team of the Month' in June 2018, after scoring 4 goals in just 5 games, and again to the 'Team of the Month' in August, this time giving 5 assists in 6 games and playing an important role in Honka's offense. The 2018 season ended for Honka, however, in a disappointing way, when KuPS took the third place by having a better goal difference.

In 2019 Kaufmann did not start off hot; scoring his first goal of the season not until in a 3–0 home win against HIFK in mid-July.

== Career statistics ==
=== Club ===
As of match played 18 February 2017

Appearances and goals by club, season and competition
Club	Season	League			National Cup		League Cup		Continental		Other		Total	
Club	Season	Division	Apps	Goals	Apps	Goals	Apps	Goals	Apps	Goals	Apps	Goals	Apps	Goals
PKKU/Ekenäs IF	2014	Kakkonen	11	6	-		-		-		-		11	6
Ekenäs IF	2015	Ykkönen	24	4	3	1	-		-		-		27	5
PK-35 Vantaa	2016	Veikkausliiga	24	2	4	2	2	2	-		-		30	6
Ekenäs IF	2016	Ykkönen	7	0	-		-		-		-		7	0
Honka	2017	Ykkönen	25	6	3	0	-		-		-		28	6
Honka	2018	Veikkausliiga	30	5	1	0	-		-		-		31	5
Honka	2019	Veikkausliiga	17	1	7	0	-		-		-		24	1
Career total			138	24	18	3	2	2	-	-	-	-	158	29
