= Lauri Ala-Myllymäki =

Finnish footballer (born 1997)

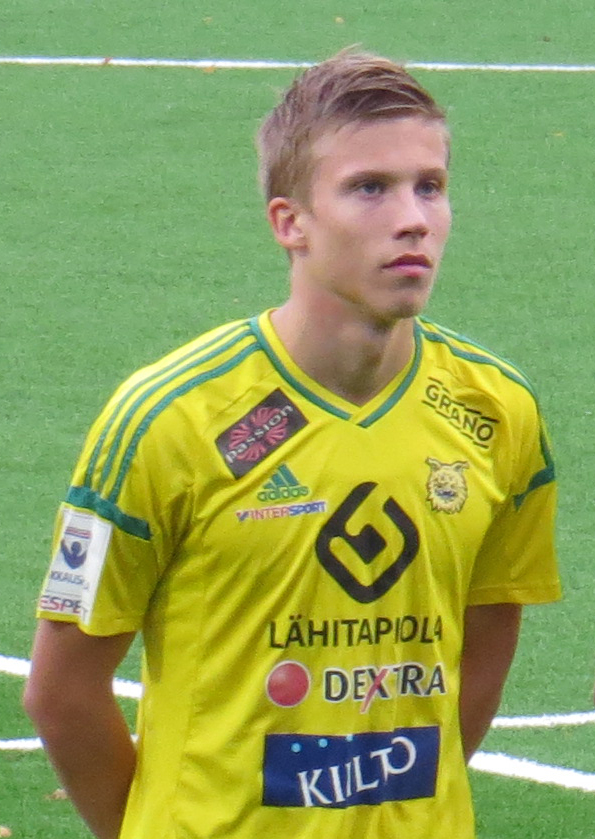
- Ala-Myllymäki with Ilves in 2015

Personal information
- Full name: Lauri Elias Ala-Myllymäki
- Date of birth: 4 June 1997 (age 29)
- Place of birth: Pirkkala, Finland
- Height: 1.83 m (6 ft 0 in)
- Position: Attacking midfielder

Team information
- Current team: Ilves
- Number: 15

Youth career
- 2002–2013: Ilves

Senior career*
Years	Team	Apps	(Gls)
2013–2020	Ilves	198	(40)
2021–2023	Venezia	0	(0)
2022–2023	→ Triestina (loan)	10	(0)
2023–	Ilves	68	(10)

International career^{‡}
2013	Finland U16	16	(1)
2014	Finland U17	8	(2)
2015	Finland U18	14	(0)
2015–2016	Finland U19	6	(0)
2017–2018	Finland U21	8	(0)
- * Club domestic league appearances and goals as of 13 November 2026 ‡ National team caps and goals as of 19 October 2019

Lauri Elias Ala-Myllymäki (born 4 June 1997) is a Finnish professional footballer who plays as an attacking midfielder for Ilves. He began his senior club career playing for Ilves, before signing with Venezia in 2021.

== Club career ==
=== Ilves ===
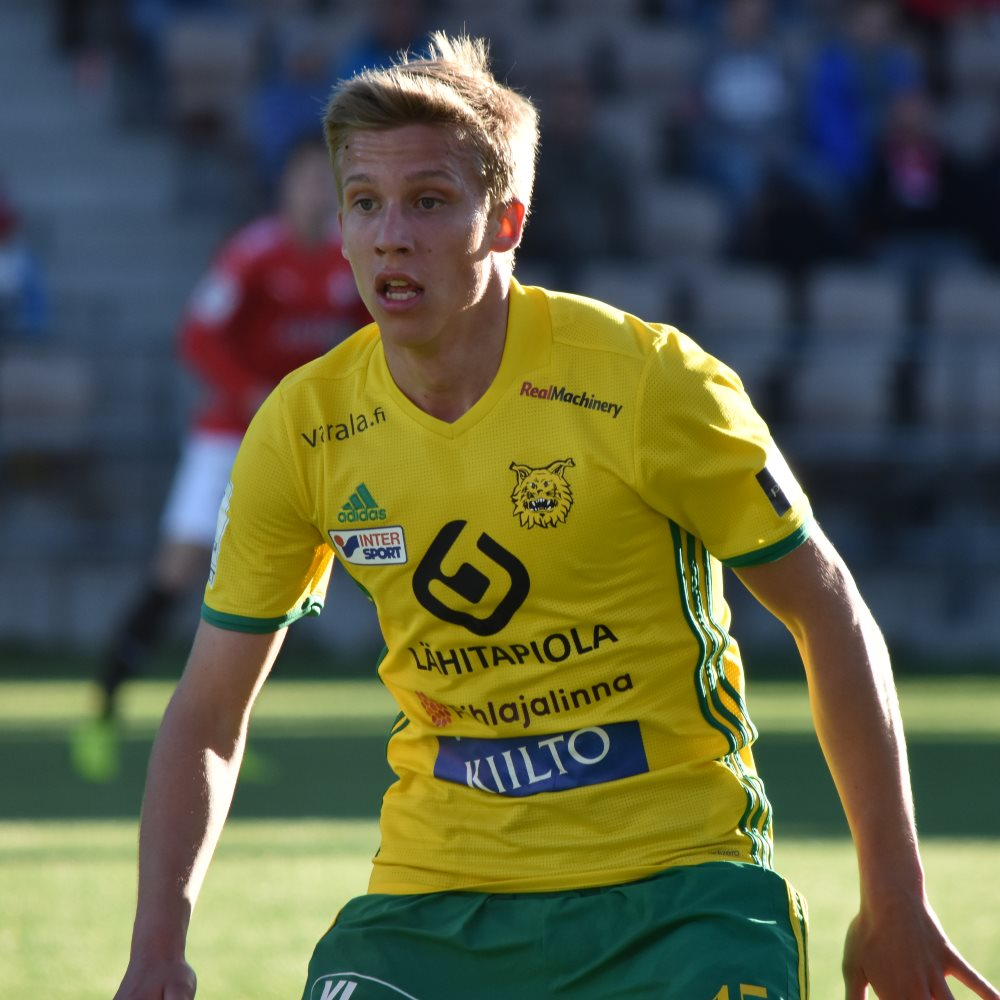
Ala-Myllymäki in 2017

Ala-Myllymäki debuted on senior level on 15 June 2013 at the age of 16 in the ranks of Ilves in a match against KTP.

=== Venezia ===
On 5 November 2020, he signed a 3.5-year contract with Italian club Venezia.

On 31 January 2022, Ala-Myllymäki joined Triestina on loan until 30 June 2023.

During his time in Venezia, Ala-Myllymäki suffered a severe knee-injury and was sidelined for several months. He suffered from a knee injury also while with Triestina and played with a bad knee.

=== Return to Ilves ===
On 24 January 2023, Ala-Myllymäki returned to his former club Ilves on a two-year contract. On 17 October 2024, his deal was extended until the end of 2026.

== International career ==
He has represented Finland at international youth levels and he played in 8 out of 10 2019 UEFA European Under-21 Championship qualification matches.

== Career statistics ==
As of 27 July 2026

Appearances and goals by club, season and competition
Club	Season	League			National cup (Note: Includes Suomen Cup.])		League cup (Note: Includes Finnish League Cup.)		Europe		Total	
Club	Season	Division	Apps	Goals	Apps	Goals	Apps	Goals	Apps	Goals	Apps	Goals
Ilves	2013	Ykkönen	10	2	0	0	—		—		10	2
Ilves	2014	Ykkönen	25	0	0	0	—		—		25	0
Ilves	2015	Veikkausliiga	27	1	1	0	3	0	—		31	1
Ilves	2016	Veikkausliiga	31	9	5	1	5	0	—		41	10
Ilves	2017	Veikkausliiga	30	3	0	0	—		—		30	3
Ilves	2018	Veikkausliiga	30	6	6	0	—		2 (Note: Appearances in UEFA Europa League)	0	36	6
Ilves	2019	Veikkausliiga	24	12	5	1	—		—		29	13
Ilves	2020	Veikkausliiga	18	7	7	3	—		1	1	26	11
Ilves	Total		198	40	24	5	8	0	3	1	233	46
Venezia	2020–21	Serie B	0	0	0	0	—		—		0	0
Venezia	2021–22	Serie A	0	0	0	0	—		—		0	0
Venezia	Total		0	0	0	0	0	0	0	0	0	0
Triestina (loan)	2021–22	Serie C	10	0	0	0	—		—		10	0
Ilves	2023	Veikkausliiga	20	3	5	1	3	0	—		28	4
Ilves	2024	Veikkausliiga	21	5	0	0	3	0	4 (Note: Includes UEFA Conference League)	1	27	5
Ilves	2025	Veikkausliiga	20	2	1	0	5	3	1	0	5	3
Ilves	2026	Veikkausliiga	1	0	0	0	0	0	1	0	2	0
Ilves	Total		62	10	6	1	11	3	6	1	85	15
Career total			270	51	30	6	19	3	10	2	329	61

== Honours ==
Ilves

- Finnish Cup: 2019, 2023
- Veikkausliiga runner-up: 2024

Individual

- Ilves Player of the Year: 2016
- Veikkausliiga Player of the Month: June 2019
- Veikkausliiga Team of the Year: 2019
