= Saku Heiskanen =

Finnish footballer (born 2001)

Personal information
- Date of birth: 29 September 2001 (age 25)
- Place of birth: Espoo, Finland
- Height: 1.71 m (5 ft 7 in)
- Positions: Central midfielder; right back

Team information
- Current team: KuPS
- Number: 3

Youth career
- Masalan Kisa
- –2017: Honka
- 2017–2019: TSG Hoffenheim

College career
Years	Team	Apps	(Gls)
2023	UCF Knights	16	(5)

Senior career*
Years	Team	Apps	(Gls)
2017	Honka	0	(0)
2017	Honka II	5	(0)
2017–2019	TSG Hoffenheim	0	(0)
2018	→ Klubi 04 (loan)	3	(0)
2019	→ Honka (loan)	0	(0)
2019	→ Honka II (loan)	6	(0)
2019–2021	Klubi 04	46	(11)
2022–2023	Honka	10	(0)
2022	Honka II	5	(1)
2024–2026	Gnistan	57	(7)
2026–	KuPS	19	(0)

International career^{‡}
2016	Finland U16	3	(1)
2017–2018	Finland U17	9	(0)
2021	Finland U20	2	(0)
- * Club domestic league appearances and goals as of 12 November 2026 ‡ National team caps and goals as of 24 February 2024

Saku Heiskanen (born 29 September 2001) is a Finnish professional football player who plays as a right back for Veikkausliiga side KuPS.

== Career ==
On 10 August 2017, Heiskanen signed with TSG 1899 Hoffenheim, and was registered as a youth player.

During the 2022 Veikkausliiga season when playing for Honka, Heiskanen suffered a long-lasting pain in his hip, which required a surgery. The surgery was not covered by the insurance and Honka was not willing to cover the expenses, so Heiskanen was forced to pay over €10,000 himself to be able to continue football.

Heiskanen moved to the United States and joined the University of Central Florida team UCF Knights in June 2023.

In January 2024, Heiskanen returned to Finland and signed with a newly promoted Veikkausliiga club Gnistan. He was named in the Veikkausliiga Team of the Year in 2024, by the Finnish sports journalists. On 1 October, his deal was extended for the 2025.

== Career statistics ==
As of 12 November 2026

Appearances and goals by club, season and competition
Club	Season	League			Cup (Note: Includes Suomen Cup)		League cup		Other		Total	
Club	Season	Division	Apps	Goals	Apps	Goals	Apps	Goals	Apps	Goals	Apps	Goals
Honka	2017	Ykkönen	0	0	1	0	–		–		1	0
Honka Akatemia	2017	Kolmonen	5	0	–		–		1 (Note: Includes UEFA Regions' Cup)	0	6	0
TSG Hoffenheim	2017–18	Bundesliga	0	0	0	0	–		–		0	0
Klubi 04 (loan)	2018	Ykkönen	3	0	–		–		–		3	0
Honka (loan)	2019	Veikkausliiga	0	0	1	0	–		–		1	0
Honka Akatemia (loan)	2019	Kakkonen	6	0	–		–		–		6	0
Klubi 04	2019	Kakkonen	8	0	–		–		–		8	0
Klubi 04	2020	Kakkonen	16	9	1	0	–		–		17	9
Klubi 04	2021	Ykkönen	22	2	2	0	–		–		24	2
Klubi 04	Total		46	11	3	0	0	0	0	0	49	11
Honka	2022	Veikkausliiga	10	0	1	1	5	0	–		16	1
Honka Akatemia	2022	Kakkonen	5	1	–		–		–		5	1
Gnistan	2024	Veikkausliiga	29	5	2	1	5	0	–		36	6
Gnistan	2025	Veikkausliiga	28	2	3	0	5	0	–		36	2
Gnistan	Total		57	7	5	1	10	0	0	0	72	8
KuPS	2026	Veikkausliiga	19	0	3	0	2	0	5 (Note: Two appearances in UEFA Champions League, One appearance in UEFA Conference League and two appearances in UEFA Conference League)	0	2	0
Career total			151	19	14	2	17	0	6	0	188	21

== Honours ==
Honka

- Finnish League Cup: 2022

Klubi 04

- Kakkonen, Group B: 2020

Individual

- Veikkausliiga Team of the Year: 2024
- Sun Belt Conference Newcomer of the Year: 2023
- Sun Belt Conference Freshman of the Year: 2023
