= Joona Rahikka =

Finnish footballer (born 1999)

Personal information
- Date of birth: 29 January 1999 (age 27)
- Position: Defender

Team information
- Current team: FC Honka

Senior career*
Years	Team	Apps	(Gls)
2016–2017	KäPa	25	(0)
2018–	FC Honka	1	(0)
2018	→ Pallohonka (loan)	10	(0)
2019	→ Pallohonka (loan)	15	(1)
- * Club domestic league appearances and goals as of 14:00, 19 September 2019 (UTC)

Joona Rahikka (born 29 January 1999) is a Finnish professional footballer who plays for FC Honka, as a defender.
