= 2007 Ykkönen =

Finnish League Division 1
- Season: 2007

League tables for teams participating Finnish Football League Tables in Ykkönen, the second tier of the Finnish football league system, in 2007.

== League table ==
Pos	Team	Pld	W	D	L	GF	GA	GD	Pts	Promotion or relegation
1	KuPS (C, P)	26	16	8	2	44	17	+27	56	Promotion to Veikkausliiga
2	RoPS (P)	26	16	7	3	44	23	+21	55	Qualification to Promotion playoffs
3	JJK	26	11	8	7	45	30	+15	41	
4	FC Hämeenlinna	26	11	8	7	37	27	+10	41	
5	TP-47	26	10	7	9	36	29	+7	37	
6	VIFK	26	9	9	8	31	35	−4	36	
7	Atlantis	26	9	7	10	33	32	+1	34	
8	PK-35	26	8	9	9	36	33	+3	33	
9	JIPPO	26	8	8	10	32	37	−5	32	
10	KPV	26	8	7	11	27	46	−19	31	
11	TPV	26	8	6	12	24	37	−13	30	
12	GBK (R)	26	7	6	13	28	38	−10	27	Relegation to Kakkonen
13	PP-70 (R)	26	6	7	13	31	44	−13	25	Relegation to Kakkonen
14	Klubi-04 (R)	26	2	9	15	25	45	−20	15	Relegation to Kakkonen

(C) Champions; (P) Promoted; (R) Relegated

=== Promotion play-offs ===
FC Viikingit as 13th placed team of the 2007 Veikkausliiga and RoPS as runners-up of the 2007 Ykkönen competed in a two-legged play-off for a place in the Veikkausliiga. RoPS won the play-off by 2-1 on aggregate and were promoted to the Veikkausliiga.

RoPS Rovaniemi - Viikingit Helsinki 1-0
Viikingit Helsinki - RoPS Rovaniemi 1-1
