= Jonas Levänen =

Finnish footballer (born 1994)

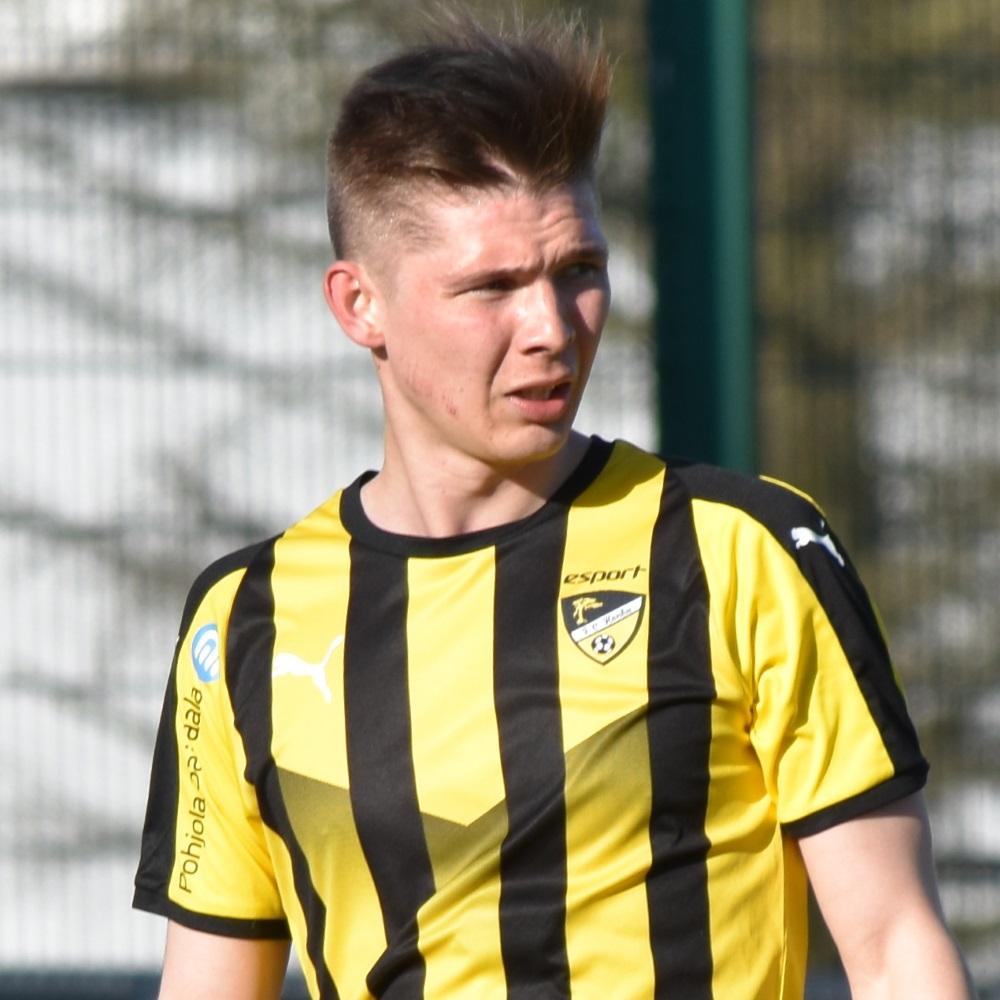
- Levänen with FC Honka in 2018.

Personal information
- Date of birth: 12 January 1994 (age 32)
- Place of birth: Espoo, Finland
- Height: 1.78 m (5 ft 10 in)
- Position: Defender

Senior career*
Years	Team	Apps	(Gls)
2011–2014	Pallohonka	23	(3)
2014–2015	FC Honka	27	(1)
2016–2017	VPS	48	(3)
2018–2022	FC Honka	77	(1)
- * Club domestic league appearances and goals

Jonas Levänen (born 12 January 1994) is a Finnish former professional footballer who played as a defender. He was part of the Veikkausliiga Team of the Month for August 2018 while playing for Honka.
