= Tommi Saarinen =

Finnish footballer (born 1995)

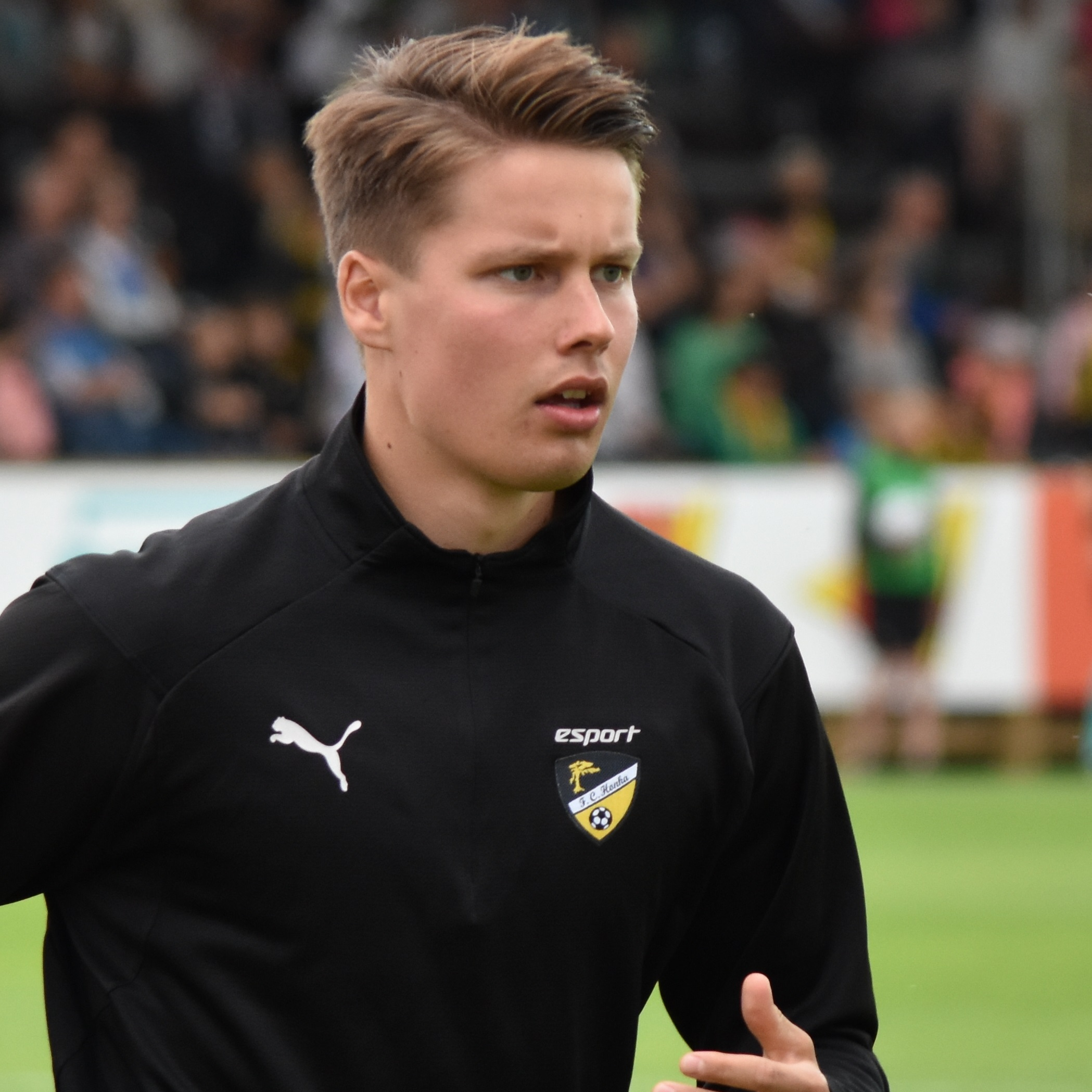
- Saarinen with FC Honka in 2018.

Personal information
- Date of birth: 31 January 1995 (age 31)
- Place of birth: Espoo, Finland
- Position: Centre back

Youth career
- Honka

Senior career*
Years	Team	Apps	(Gls)
2012–2013	Pallohonka	13	(3)
2013–2019	Honka	99	(8)
2020–2021	KPV	33	(2)
- * Club domestic league appearances and goals as of 21:44, 15 May 2020 (UTC)

Tommi Saarinen (born 31 January 1995) is a Finnish former professional footballer who played as a midfielder.

== Career ==
Saarinen started his career with FC Honka.

On 21 November 2019 it was confirmed, that Saarinen would join Kokkolan Palloveikot for the 2020 season, signing a deal until the end of 2021.
