= Pasi Rasimus =

Finnish footballer (born 1962)

Personal information
- Full name: Pasi Kalevi Rasimus
- Date of birth: 6 March 1962 (age 64)
- Place of birth: Helsinki
- Position: Midfielder

Senior career*
Years	Team	Apps	(Gls)
1979–1983	HJK Helsinki	87	(16)
1984–1985	TPS Turku	51	(6)
1986–1989	HJK Helsinki	83	(13)
1990–1991	Lillestrøm	21	(2)
1992–1995	FinnPa	81	(9)

International career
1983–1986	Finland	4	(1)

Managerial career
- 2010–?: Klubi 04
- * Club domestic league appearances and goals

Pasi Rasimus (born 6 March 1962) is a retired Finnish football midfielder. Being capped for Finland and playing abroad with Lillestrøm, he was sacked by Lillestrøm after riding in teammate Ivaylo Kirov' car; Kirov hit a pedestrian while both players were under the influence. In Finland he played for Helsingin Jalkapalloklubi, Turun Palloseura and FinnPa.

His son Konsta is also a footballer.
