= Jatuli Laevuo =

Finnish footballer (born 1995)

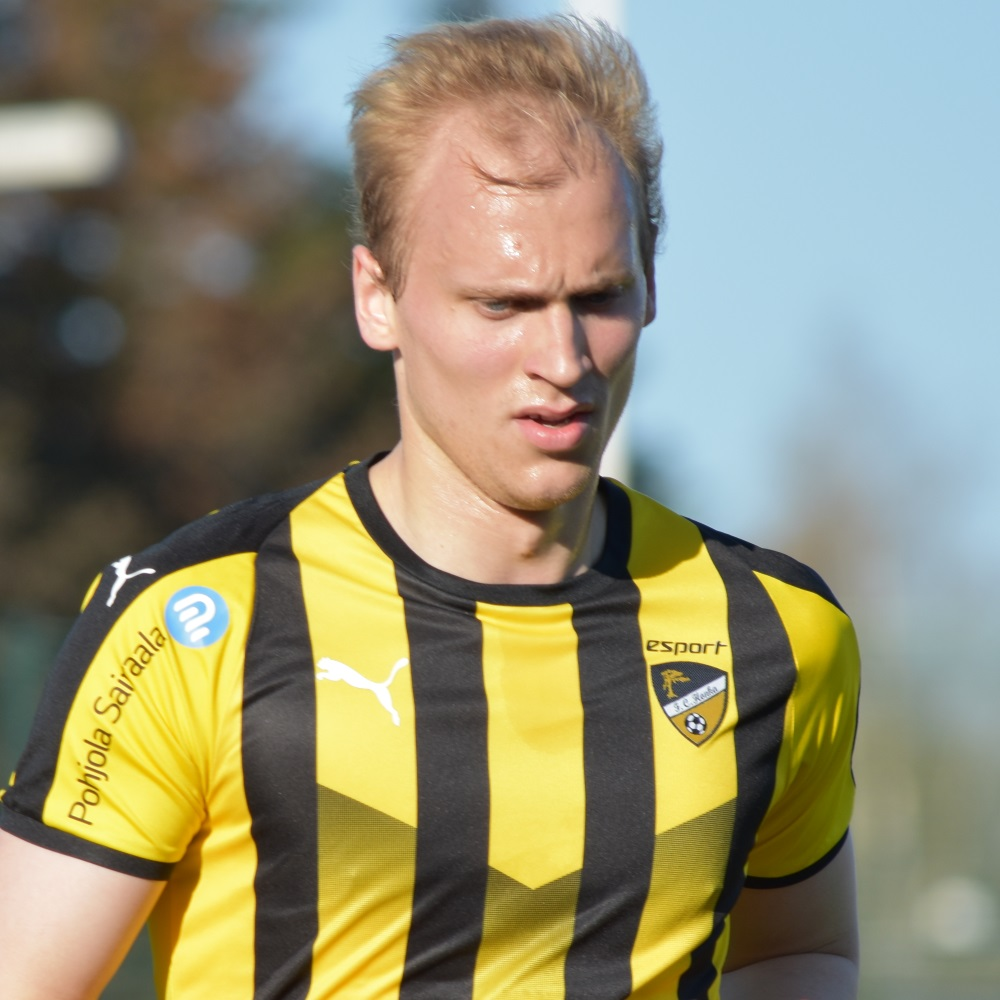

Personal information
- Date of birth: 19 May 1995 (age 31)
- Position: Defender

Team information
- Current team: FC Honka

Senior career*
Years	Team	Apps	(Gls)
2013–2014	Pallohonka	28	(4)
2014–	FC Honka	75	(9)
- * Club domestic league appearances and goals as of 08:57, 25 May 2018 (UTC)

Jatuli Laevuo (born 19 May 1995) is a Finnish professional footballer who plays for FC Honka, as a defender.
