= Konsta Rasimus =

Finnish footballer (born 1990)

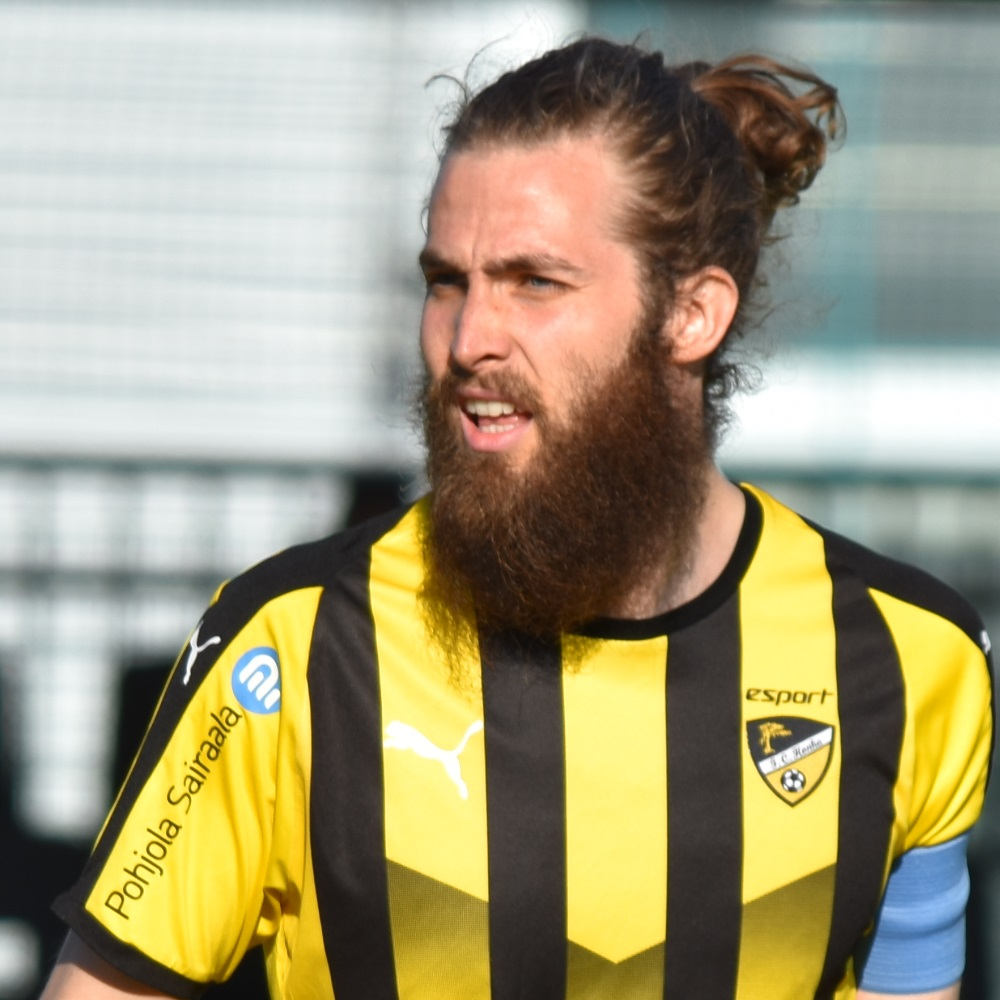

Personal information
- Date of birth: 15 December 1990 (age 35)
- Place of birth: Helsinki, Finland
- Height: 1.79 m (5 ft 10 1/2 in)
- Position: Midfielder

Team information
- Current team: Gnistan
- Number: 16

Youth career
- HJK

Senior career*
Years	Team	Apps	(Gls)
2009–2011	Honka	24	(1)
2009–2011	→ Honka II	29	(6)
2011	→ IFK Mariehamn (loan)	11	(0)
2012–2017	PK-35	95	(1)
2012	→ PK-35/VJS	1	(0)
2012	→ TPS (loan)	9	(1)
2017–2022	Honka	134	(3)
2023–	Gnistan	26	(0)

International career^{‡}
2009	Finland U-19	2	(0)
2011	Finland U-21	3	(0)
- * Club domestic league appearances and goals as of 27 November 2023 ‡ National team caps and goals as of 28 March 2011

Konsta Rasimus (born 15 December 1990) is a Finnish professional footballer who plays for the Ykkönen side Gnistan.

== Club career ==
Rasimus was selected to the Veikkausliiga Team of the Month for June 2018 while playing for FC Honka and again for Team of the Month for September 2018.

On 8 December 2022, Rasimus signed with Gnistan for the 2023 season.

== Personal life ==
His father Pasi Rasimus is a former professional footballer.
