= Aatu Laatikainen =

Finnish footballer (born 1997)

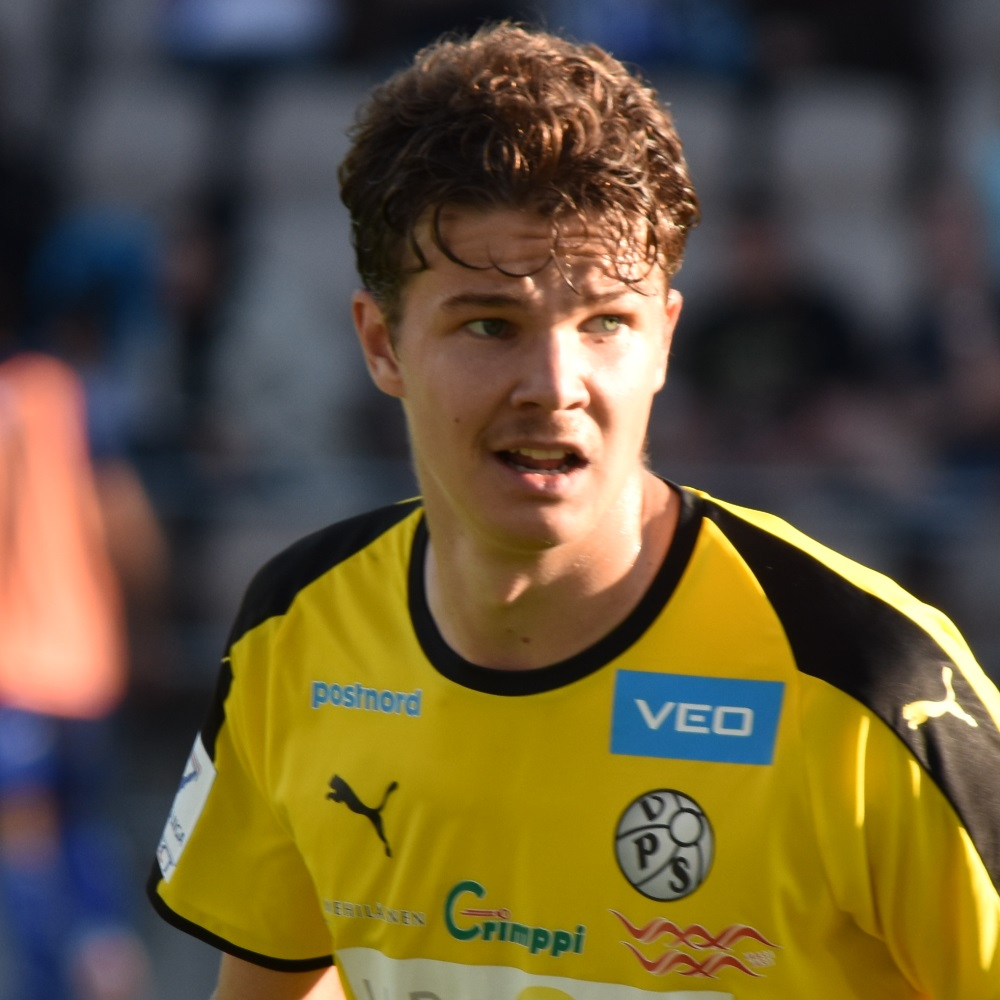

Personal information
- Full name: Aatu Petteri Laatikainen
- Date of birth: 3 January 1997 (age 29)
- Position: Midfielder

Senior career*
Years	Team	Apps	(Gls)
2014–2015	KuPS	4	(0)
2016–2021	VPS	126	(2)
- * Club domestic league appearances and goals as of 23 October 2021

Aatu Petteri Laatikainen (born 3 January 1997) is a Finnish professional footballer who plays as a midfielder.
