= Rasmus Leislahti =

Finnish footballer (born 2000)

Personal information
- Full name: Rasmus Jorma Leislahti
- Date of birth: 16 June 2000 (age 26)
- Place of birth: Kirkkonummi, Finland
- Height: 1.84 m (6 ft 0 in)
- Position: Goalkeeper

Team information
- Current team: Ilves
- Number: 31

Senior career*
Years	Team	Apps	(Gls)
2017–2018	Klubi-04	16	(0)
2019	Honka II	15	(0)
2020	VPS	14	(0)
2020	→ VIFK (loan)	1	(0)
2021–2022	Ilves	46	(0)
2023	KTP	22	(0)
2024–2025	VPS	27	(0)
2026–	Ilves	0	(0)
2026–	Ilves II	3	(0)

International career^{‡}
2018	Finland U19	11	(0)
2019–2022	Finland U21	3	(0)
- * Club domestic league appearances and goals as of 13 November 2026 ‡ National team caps and goals as of 21 February 2024

Rasmus Jorma Leislahti (born 16 June 2000) is a Finnish professional footballer who plays as a goalkeeper for Veikkausliiga club Ilves.

== Club career ==
After playing in third tier Kakkonen with Klubi 04 and Honka II, and in second tier Ykkönen with VPS since 2018, Leislahti signed with Veikkausliiga club Ilves for the 2021 season.

On 22 October 2022, Leislahti signed a two-year contract with newly promoted Veikkausliiga club KTP, beginning in the 2023 season.

After KTP were relegated after the 2023 season, Leislahti signed a two-year deal with fellow Veikkausliiga club VPS, and returned to Vaasa.
