= Abel Suárez =

Spanish footballer

Personal information
- Full name: Abel Miguel Suárez Torres
- Date of birth: 11 April 1991 (age 35)
- Place of birth: Puerto del Rosario, Spain
- Height: 1.88 m (6 ft 2 in)
- Position: Midfielder

Team information
- Current team: Herbania

Youth career
- Tenerife

Senior career*
Years	Team	Apps	(Gls)
2011–2013	Tenerife B	25	(1)
2011–2016	Tenerife	20	(0)
2013	→ Guijuelo (loan)	11	(0)
2013–2014	→ Noja (loan)	19	(4)
2014	→ Leganés (loan)	17	(0)
2014–2015	→ La Roda (loan)	33	(3)
2016	Poli Timișoara	7	(0)
2016–2017	Pontevedra	35	(5)
2017–2018	Burgos	20	(0)
2018	Racing Ferrol	10	(0)
2018–2019	Linense	10	(0)
2019	Honka	12	(2)
2019–2020	Badalona	23	(1)
2020–2021	Socuéllamos	20	(0)
2021–2022	Ebro	25	(1)
2022–2023	Arosa	28	(0)
2023–	Herbania	5	(0)
- * Club domestic league appearances and goals as of 20:18, 22 October 2023 (UTC)

Abel Miguel Suárez Torres (born 11 April 1991) is a Spanish footballer who plays for Herbania as a central midfielder.

== Club career ==
Born in Puerto del Rosario, Province of Las Palmas, Suárez finished his development with local CD Tenerife, and made his senior debut with the reserves in the 2010–11 season in the Tercera División. On 4 June 2011 he appeared in his first professional match with the Canary Islands club, starting in a 0–1 Segunda División home loss against UD Las Palmas.

On 15 January 2013, Suárez was loaned to Segunda División B side CD Guijuelo. On 20 August, he joined SD Noja of the same league also on loan.

Suárez subsequently served another temporary deal at CD Leganés, being promoted to the second division. On 8 August 2014, he signed a new two-year contract with Tenerife and was loaned to La Roda CF for the season.

On 18 June 2015, Suárez was definitely included in Tenerife's first team in division two. After playing only six matches during the first half of the campaign, he terminated his contract on 26 January 2016 and moved to Liga I club ACS Poli Timișoara just hours later.

Suárez returned to his home country on 23 June 2016, signing for third-tier Pontevedra CF. He continued to compete at that level the following years, representing in quick succession Burgos CF, Racing de Ferrol and Real Balompédica Linense.

On 7 January 2019, Suárez joined FC Honka of the Finnish Veikkausliiga.
