= Borjas Martín =

Spanish footballer

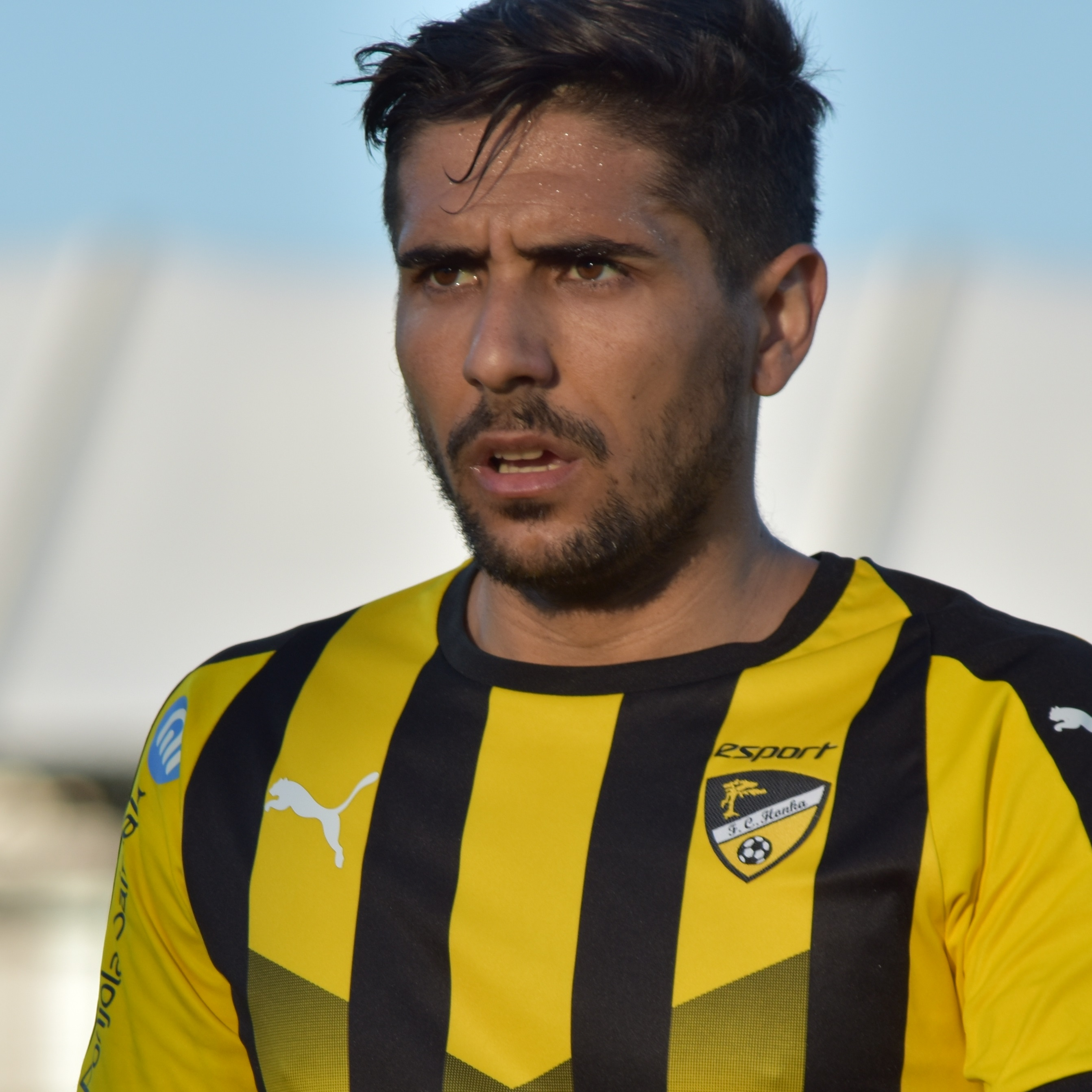

Personal information
- Full name: Borjas Martín González
- Date of birth: 28 June 1987 (age 39)
- Place of birth: Puerto de Tazacorte, Spain
- Position: Striker

Youth career
- Los Llanos

Senior career*
Years	Team	Apps	(Gls)
2005–2006	Tijarafe		
2006–2009	Victoria		
2009–2011	Mensajero	64	(16)
2011–2012	Tijarafe	32	(10)
2012–2013	Mensajero	34	(22)
2013–2014	Barbastro	29	(9)
2014–2015	Atlético Astorga	36	(13)
2015–2016	Pontevedra	36	(12)
2016–2017	Murcia	16	(2)
2017	Sabadell	16	(2)
2017–2020	Honka	87	(30)
2020–2022	Club Valencia		
2022–2023	Atlético Paso	32	(9)
2023–2024	Mensajero	32	(8)
Total		414	(123)

Managerial career
- 2024: Unión Sur Yaiza (sporting director)
- * Club domestic league appearances and goals

Borjas Martín González (born 28 June 1987) is a Spanish former professional footballer who played as a striker.

== Career ==
Borjas was born in Puerto de Tazacorte, Tenerife, Canary Islands. After finishing his training with UD Los Llanos de Aridane, he made his senior debut in the 2005–06 season with UD Tijarafe in the regional leagues.

Borjas subsequently represented CD Victoria, CD Mensajero (two stints), Tijarafe and UD Barbastro in Tercera División, before joining the Segunda División B side Atlético Astorga FC in July 2014. On 23 July the following year, after scoring 13 goals for Astorga, he signed for the fellow league team Pontevedra CF.

Borjas finished the season as Pontevedra's top goalscorer, and moved Real Murcia, still in the third division, on 21 June 2016. The following 13 January, he agreed to a contract with the fellow league team CE Sabadell FC.

On 31 July 2017, Borjas ended his contract with Sabadell, and announced two days later on his Twitter account that he had signed for the Finnish club FC Honka.

== Later career ==
After retiring at the end of the 2023-24 season, Martín was appointed sporting director of newly promoted Segunda Federación club Unión Sur Yaiza in July 2024.

== Honours ==
Individual

- Veikkausliiga Team of the Year: 2018, 2019
