= Robbie Azodo =

Finnish footballer (born 2001)

Personal information
- Full name: Robbie Floyd Odimegwu Azodo
- Date of birth: 23 April 2001 (age 25)
- Place of birth: Vantaa, Finland
- Height: 1.76 m (5 ft 9 in)
- Position: Winger

Team information
- Current team: Ilves-Kissat

Youth career
- Itä-Vantaan Urheilijat
- –2016: TiPS
- 2017: PK-35
- 2018: PK Keski-Uusimaa

Senior career*
Years	Team	Apps	(Gls)
2018	PK Keski-Uusimaa	20	(6)
2019–2020	Honka II	29	(9)
2019–2020	Honka	2	(0)
2021	Klubi 04	12	(0)
2022	AB Argir	13	(1)
2022	→ AB Argir II	1	(2)
2023	HIFK	17	(0)
2024	JäPS	0	(0)
2024	Finnkurd	11	(11)
2024–	Ilves-Kissat	2	(0)

International career^{‡}
2016	Finland U16	2	(0)
2018–2019	Finland U18	7	(2)
2019	Finland U19	1	(0)
- * Club domestic league appearances and goals as of 3 December 2024 ‡ National team caps and goals as of 25 March 2024

Robbie Floyd Odimegwu Azodo (born 23 April 2001) is a Finnish professional footballer who plays as a winger for Ilves-Kissat.

== Personal life ==
Born and raised in Finland, Azodo is of Nigerian descent. His father Hilary Azodo is a former football player who has worked as a player agent and sporting director in Finland.
