= Duarte Tammilehto =

Finnish footballer (born 1990)

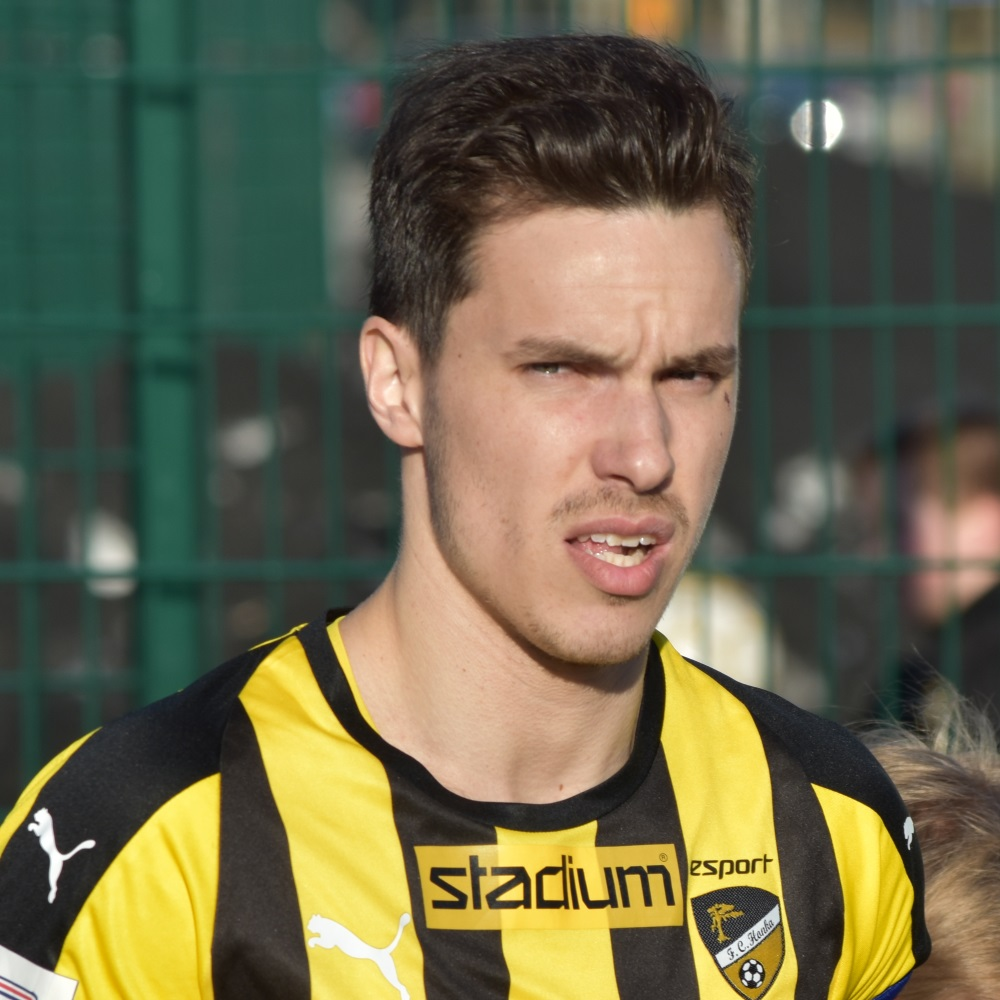
- Duarte Tammilehto with FC Honka in 2019.

Personal information
- Full name: Duarte Cartaxo Tammilehto
- Date of birth: 15 February 1990 (age 36)
- Place of birth: Cascais, Portugal
- Height: 1.77 m (5 ft 9 1/2 in)
- Position: Midfielder

Senior career*
Years	Team	Apps	(Gls)
2009–2010	Klubi-04	39	(2)
2011–2012	FC Honka	46	(1)
2013	TPS	4	(1)
2014–2015	IFK Mariehamn	53	(4)
2016	FC Lahti	29	(0)
2017–2022	FC Honka	80	(0)
2023–	Gilla FC	47	(13)

International career
- Finland U15
- Finland U17
2011−2012	Finland U21	5	(0)
Medal record
Honka
Winner	Finnish League Cup	2011
Winner	Finnish Cup	2012
- * Club domestic league appearances and goals

Duarte Cartaxo Tammilehto (born 15 February 1990) is a Finnish former football player.

Born in Cascais, Portugal, to a Portuguese mother and a Finnish father, Tammilehto also holds a Portuguese passport.

== Honours ==
=== Club ===
FC Honka

- Finnish Cup: 2012
- Finnish League Cup: 2011
