= 2008 Kakkonen – Finnish League Division 2 =

Finnish League Division 2
- Season: 2008
- Champions: Klubi 04; PoPa; FC Kiisto
- Promoted: Above teams
- Relegated: 9 teams

League tables for teams participating in Kakkonen, the third tier of the Finnish football league system, in 2008.

== League tables ==
=== Group A ===
Pos	Team	Pld	W	D	L	GF	GA	GD	Pts	Promotion or relegation
1	Klubi 04, Helsinki (C, P)	26	18	4	4	68	19	+49	58	Promotion to Ykkönen
2	Warkaus JK	26	15	8	3	60	28	+32	53	
3	FC Kuusankoski	26	17	2	7	62	34	+28	53	
4	Gnistan, Helsinki	26	12	5	9	44	42	+2	41	
5	KTP, Kotka	26	12	4	10	39	34	+5	40	
6	MP, Mikkeli	26	12	4	10	40	41	−1	40	
7	HIFK, Helsinki	26	11	5	10	39	31	+8	38	
8	PK Keski-Uusimaa, Kerava	26	10	5	11	49	50	−1	35	
9	LPS, Helsinki	26	10	4	12	42	44	−2	34	
10	HyPS, Hyvinkää	26	8	8	10	52	49	+3	32	
11	FCJ, Jyväskylä	26	9	5	12	33	33	0	32	
12	City Stars, Lahti (R)	26	8	7	11	33	41	−8	31	Relegation to Kolmonen
13	FC Kontu, Helsinki (R)	26	5	4	17	22	61	−39	19	Relegation to Kolmonen
14	Rakuunat, Lappeenranta (R)	26	1	3	22	20	96	−76	6	Relegation to Kolmonen

(C) Champions; (P) Promoted; (R) Relegated

=== Group B ===
Pos	Team	Pld	W	D	L	GF	GA	GD	Pts	Promotion or relegation
1	PoPa, Pori (C, P)	26	21	1	4	88	28	+60	64	Promotion to Ykkönen
2	LoPa, Lohja	26	18	2	6	54	24	+30	56	
3	KaaPo, Kaarina	26	18	2	6	55	33	+22	56	
4	PP-70, Tampere	26	13	8	5	44	28	+16	47	
5	Ilves, Tampere	26	13	5	8	40	24	+16	44	
6	P-Iirot, Rauma	26	13	2	11	46	38	+8	41	
7	ÅIFK, Turku	26	11	4	11	48	33	+15	37	
8	SalPa, Salo	26	11	4	11	43	34	+9	37	
9	FC Espoo	26	10	4	12	56	58	−2	34	
10	EIF, Tammisaari	26	9	5	12	35	48	−13	32	
11	Sinimustat	26	7	6	13	45	38	+7	27	
12	Huima, Äänekoski (R)	26	5	5	16	27	68	−41	20	Relegation to Kolmonen
13	IFFK, Finström (R)	26	5	2	19	23	66	−43	17	Relegation to Kolmonen
14	FJK (R)	26	2	2	22	16	100	−84	8	Relegation to Kolmonen

(C) Champions; (P) Promoted; (R) Relegated

=== Group C ===
Pos	Team	Pld	W	D	L	GF	GA	GD	Pts	Promotion or relegation
1	FC Kiisto, Vaasa (C, P)	26	17	6	3	57	18	+39	57	Promotion to Ykkönen
2	GBK, Kokkola	26	16	3	7	48	18	+30	51	
3	OPS-jp, Oulu	26	14	5	7	45	34	+11	47	
4	FC OPA	26	12	6	8	43	29	+14	42	
5	Norrvalla FF, Vöyri	26	12	6	8	45	35	+10	42	
6	FC YPA, Ylivieska	26	11	6	9	45	40	+5	39	
7	JBK, Pietarsaari	26	12	3	11	41	36	+5	39	
8	Seinäjoen JK	26	10	7	9	57	37	+20	37	
9	OLS, Oulu	26	9	4	13	26	40	−14	31	
10	Närpes Kraft, Närpiö	26	9	3	14	33	51	−18	30	
11	PK-37, Iisalmi	26	8	6	12	27	46	−19	30	
12	Kings (R)	26	7	8	11	38	37	+1	29	Relegation to Kolmonen
13	VPS-j, Vaasa (R)	26	8	1	17	29	56	−27	25	Relegation to Kolmonen
14	TUS, Teerijärvi (R)	26	4	2	20	25	82	−57	14	Relegation to Kolmonen

(C) Champions; (P) Promoted; (R) Relegated

== References and sources ==
- Finnish FA, Suomen Palloliitto
