= 2019 Finnish Cup =

64th season of the Finnish Cup football competition

Tournament details
- Country: Finland

The 2019 Finnish Cup was the 65th season of the Finnish Cup football competition.

Until the 2017–2018 season, the tournament was held in the autumn-spring schedule from July to September of the following year. The introduction of this new format of the contest meant that the League Cup was suspended.

The winner of the Finnish Cup qualifies for the 2020–21 UEFA Europa League.

== Teams ==
Round	Dates	Clubs involved	Winners from previous round	New entries this round	Leagues entering this round
First round (group stage)		47		–	Veikkausliiga (12), Ykkönen (10), Kakkonen (25)
1/8 finals		16		–	
Quarter-finals		8		–	
Semi-finals		4		–	
Finals		2		–	

== Group stage ==
The teams participating in the group stage were the teams of Veikkausliiga (12), Ykkönen (10) and Kakkonen (25). The group stage was played between January and March 2019 with teams divided into 12 divisional groups, two groups with Veikkausliiga and Ykkönen teams, and 8 groups with Kakkonen teams. The four best teams of the Veikkausliiga A and B groups, the first two teams of the Ykkönen A and B teams, and the winners of Kakkonen groups continued in the eighth finals.

=== Veikkausliiga – Group A ===
Team	Pld	W	D	L	GF	GA	GD	Pts
FC Honka	5	3	1	1	7	4	+3	10
Inter Turku	5	3	0	2	7	6	+1	9
FC Lahti	5	3	0	2	6	7	−1	9
IFK Mariehamn	5	2	2	1	7	4	+3	8
HJK	5	2	1	2	9	7	+2	7
HIFK	5	0	0	5	3	11	−8	0

Source: Finnish Football Association

=== Veikkausliiga – Group B ===
Team	Pld	W	D	L	GF	GA	GD	Pts
FC Ilves	5	4	1	0	12	4	+8	13
VPS	5	3	0	2	5	6	−1	9
KPV	5	2	2	1	6	4	+2	8
RoPS	5	2	1	2	8	9	−1	7
SJK	5	0	2	3	7	10	−3	2
KuPS	5	0	2	3	6	11	−5	2

Source: Finnish Football Association

=== Ykkönen – Group A ===
Team	Pld	W	D	L	GF	GA	GD	Pts
AC Oulu	4	2	1	1	8	3	+5	7
FC Haka	4	2	1	1	7	5	+2	7
MuSa	4	2	1	1	7	6	+1	7
MYPA	4	0	3	1	3	6	−3	3
FF Jaro	4	0	2	2	2	7	−5	2

Source: Finnish Football Association

=== Ykkönen – Group B ===
Team	Pld	W	D	L	GF	GA	GD	Pts
TPV	4	2	1	1	12	6	+6	7
KTP	4	2	1	1	8	5	+3	7
TPS Turku	4	2	0	2	8	6	+2	6
AC Kajaani	4	2	0	2	5	12	−7	6
Ekenäs IF	4	1	0	3	6	10	−4	3

Source: Finnish Football Association

=== 1/8 finals ===
15 March 2019	VJS	0–3	Kokkolan Palloveikot	Vantaa
19:00 (EEST)		Report		Stadium: Myyrmaki-halli; Attendance: 1800

15 March 2019	IF Gnistan	1–3 (a.e.t.)	VPS	Helsinki
19:00 (EEST)		Report		Stadium: Mustapekka Areena; Attendance: 417

16 March 2019	Haka	0–1	RoPS	Valkeakoski
14:30 (EEST)		Report		Stadium: Saharan tekonurmi Attendance: 243

16 March 2019	KTP	0–2	FC Ilves	Kotka
15:00 (EEST)		Report		Stadium: Arto Tolsa Areena; Attendance: 303

16 March 2019	Oulu	0–1	Honka	Oulu
15:00 (EEST)		Report		Stadium: Heinapaan halli Attendance: 1000

16 March 2019	TPV	0–2	IFK Mariehamn	Tampere
16:00 (EEST)		Report		Stadium: Pirkkahalli; Attendance: 513

16 March 2019	FC Kiisto	0–5	Lahti	Vaasa
16:00 (EEST)		Report		Stadium: Elisa Stadion; Attendance: 250

17 March 2019	JS Hercules	0–2	Inter Turku	Oulu
15:00 (EEST)		Report		Stadium: Heinapaan halli Attendance: 1000

=== Quarter-finals ===
30 March 2019	Inter Turku	1–2	VPS	Turku
15:00 (EEST)		Report		Stadium: Kupittaa 5 KHT Keinonurmi

30 March 2019	RoPS	1–2	Kokkolan Palloveikot	Rovaniemi
16:00 (EEST)		Report		Stadium: Rovaniemen Keskuskentta

30 March 2019	Honka	1–1 (a.e.t.) (3–4 p)	FC Ilves	Espoo
16:00 (EEST)		Report		Stadium: Tapiolan Monitoimiareena Oy

31 March 2019	IFK Mariehamn	3–1 (a.e.t.)	Lahti	Eckerö
18:00 (EEST)		Report		Stadium: Eckeröhallen

=== Semi-finals ===
16 May 2019	VPS	1–3	IFK Mariehamn	Vaasa
18:30 (EEST)		Report		Stadium: Elisa Stadion; Attendance: 2509; Referee: J.Hyytia

16 May 2019	Kokkolan Palloveikot	2–3	FC Ilves	Kokkola
18:30 (EEST)		Report		Stadium: Kokkolan Keskuskentta; Attendance: 1724; Referee: V.Nevalainen

=== Final ===
15 June 2019	IFK Mariehamn	0–2	FC Ilves	Mariehamn
16:00 (EEST)		Report		Stadium: Wiklof Holding Arena; Referee: Toni Pohjoismäki
