= 2017 Ykkönen =

Ykkönen
- Season: 2017
- Champions: TPS
- Promoted: TPS; FC Honka
- Relegated: GrIFK; Gnistan
- Matches: 135
- Goals: 388 (2.87 per match)
- Top goalscorer: Felix De Bona; Kalle Multanen (14 goals each)
- Biggest home win: TPS 6–0 EIF (14 June)
- Biggest away win: FC Haka 0–4 FC Honka (29 April); FC Haka 1–5 AC Oulu (1 July); AC Oulu 0–4 FF Jaro (5 August)
- Highest scoring: FF Jaro 5–2 GrIFK (3 September)

The 2017 Ykkönen was the 46th season of Ykkönen, the second highest football league in Finland. The season started on 29 April 2017 and ended on 21 October 2017. The winning team qualified directly for promotion to the 2018 Veikkausliiga, while the second had to play a play-off against the eleventh-placed team from Veikkausliiga to decide who would play in that division. The bottom two teams were relegated to Kakkonen.

== Overview ==
Location of teams in Ykkönen 2017

A total of ten teams contested in the league, including seven sides from the 2016 season, and FC Honka and Gnistan who were promoted from Kakkonen after winning the promotion play-offs.

PK-35 Vantaa, who were relegated from Veikkausliiga, declared bankruptcy and withdrew their spot from the league. OPS took their spot in the league.

KTP and FC Jazz were relegated from 2016 Ykkönen.

JJK, the champion of 2016 Ykkönen, was promoted to the 2017 Veikkausliiga.

Club	Location	Stadium	Capacity	Manager
AC Oulu	Oulu	Raatin Stadion	6,996	(Finland) Rauno Ojanen
EIF	Raseborg	Ekenäs Centrumplan	2,500	(Finland) Jens Mattfolk
FC Haka	Valkeakoski	Tehtaan kenttä	3,516	(England) (Finland) Keith Armstrong
FC Honka	Espoo	Tapiolan Urheilupuisto	6,000	(Finland) Vesa Vasara
FF Jaro	Jakobstad	Jakobstads Centralplan	5,000	(Finland) Calle Löf
Gnistan	Helsinki	Mustapekka Areena	1,100	(Italy) Roberto Nuccio
GrIFK	Kauniainen	Kauniaisten Keskuskenttä	700	(Finland) Ari Asukka
KPV	Kokkola	Kokkolan Keskuskenttä	2,000	(Finland) Jarmo Korhonen
OPS	Oulu	Raatin Stadion	6,996	(Finland) Miika Juntunen
TPS	Turku	Veritas Stadion	10,000	(Finland) Mika Laurikainen

=== Managerial changes ===
Team	Outgoing manager	Manner of departure	Date of vacancy	Incoming manager	Date of appointment	Table
FC Haka	(Finland) Kari Martonen	End of contract	n/a	(England) (Finland) Keith Armstrong	22 November 2016	Pre-season
GrIFK	(Finland) Rami Luomanpää	End of contract	n/a	(Finland) Ari Asukka	24 November 2016	Pre-season
FC Honka	(Finland) Juho Rantala	Signed by HJK	1 December 2016	(Finland) Vesa Vasara	5 December 2016	Pre-season
EIF	(Finland) Ilkka Marttila	End of contract	n/a	(Finland) Jens Mattfolk	5 December 2016	Pre-season
FF Jaro	(England) Kristian Heames	Sacked	10 July 2017	(Finland) Calle Löf	10 July 2017	7th
Gnistan	(Finland) Tommi Lingman	Mutual termination	17 July 2017	(Italy) Roberto Nuccio	20 July 2017	10th

== League table ==
Pos	Team	Pld	W	D	L	GF	GA	GD	Pts	Qualification or relegation
1	TPS (P)	27	17	7	3	49	14	+35	58	Promotion to Veikkausliiga
2	FC Honka (P)	27	16	7	4	64	24	+40	55	Qualification to Promotion playoffs
3	KPV	27	12	9	6	42	26	+16	45	
4	AC Oulu	27	12	6	9	40	40	0	42	
5	FF Jaro	27	9	8	10	36	36	0	35	
6	FC Haka	27	8	11	8	35	42	−7	35	
7	EIF	27	8	6	13	33	43	−10	30	
8	OPS	27	7	5	15	35	60	−25	26	
9	GrIFK (R)	27	5	7	15	28	59	−31	22	Relegation to Kakkonen
10	Gnistan (R)	27	5	6	16	26	44	−18	21	Relegation to Kakkonen

Source: Suomen Palloliitto
Rules for classification: 1) Points; 2) Goal difference; 3) Number of goals scored
(P) Promoted; (R) Relegated
