= 2019 Veikkausliiga =

Veikkausliiga
- Season: 2019
- Champions: KuPS; 6th title
- Relegated: KPV; VPS
- Champions League: KuPS
- Europa League: Inter Turku; Ilves
- Matches: 162
- Goals: 396 (2.44 per match)
- Top goalscorer: Filip Valenčič (16)
- Highest scoring: IFK Mariehamn 3–4 KuPS (1 May 2019)

The 2019 Veikkausliiga was the 89th season of top-tier football in Finland. Helsingin Jalkapalloklubi were the defending champions. KuPS won the title.

== New league format ==
Veikkausliiga adopted a new league format for the 2019 season. Each team played against each other twice in the regular season. After the regular season the top six teams advanced to the Championship Series which determines the champion and European tournament qualification places. The bottom six teams advanced to the Challenger Series. The best team from the Challenger Series plays in a tournament against the Championship Series' 4th, 5th, and 6th place teams. The winner from that plays in a final series against the 3rd best team from the Championship Series. The last UEFA Europa League qualification place goes to the winner of that final series.

The bottom team from the Challenger Series will relegate to the Ykkönen, and second to last team will play in a relegation play-off series against the 2nd best team from Ykkönen.

== Teams ==
Palloseura Kemi Kings were relegated to Ykkönen after finishing at the bottom of the 2018 season. Their place was taken by Ykkönen champions HIFK Fotboll.

Turun Palloseura as 11th-placed team lost their Veikkausliiga spot after losing to second-placed Ykkönen team Kokkolan Palloveikot in a relegation/promotion playoff.

=== Stadia and locations ===
Location of teams in 2019 Veikkausliiga

Club	Location	Stadium	Turf	Capacity
FC Honka	Espoo	Tapiolan Urheilupuisto	Natural	6,000
Inter Turku	Turku	Veritas Stadion	Natural	10,000
FC Lahti	Lahti	Lahden Stadion	Natural	15,000
HIFK	Helsinki	Telia 5G -areena	Artificial	10,770
HJK	Helsinki	Telia 5G -areena	Artificial	10,770
IFK Mariehamn	Mariehamn	Wiklöf Holding Arena	Natural	4,000
Ilves	Tampere	Tammelan Stadion	Natural	5,040
KPV	Kokkola	Kokkolan Keskuskenttä	Natural	2,000
KuPS	Kuopio	Savon Sanomat Areena	Artificial	5,000
RoPS	Rovaniemi	Rovaniemen keskuskenttä	Artificial	4,000
SJK	Seinäjoki	OmaSP Stadion	Artificial	6,000
VPS	Vaasa	Elisa Stadion	Artificial	6,000

== League table ==
=== Regular season ===
Pos	Team	Pld	W	D	L	GF	GA	GD	Pts	Qualification or relegation (Note: Teams played against each other twice (22 matches) after which the league split in two (top 6 and bottom 6 teams).)
1	KuPS (C)	27	15	8	4	46	24	+22	53	Qualification for the Champions League first qualifying round.
2	Inter Turku	27	15	3	9	42	29	+13	48	Qualification for the Europa League first qualifying round.
3	FC Honka (O)	27	14	5	8	41	29	+12	47	Qualification for the national Europa League qualification final.
4	Ilves	27	13	8	6	34	25	+9	47	Qualification for the Europa League first qualifying round. (Note: Ilves qualified for the Europa League first qualifying round by winning the 2019 Finnish Cup)
5	HJK	27	9	10	8	33	29	+4	37	Qualification for the national Europa League qualification tournament.
6	IFK Mariehamn	27	9	5	13	31	34	−3	32	Qualification for the national Europa League qualification tournament.
7	HIFK	27	10	9	8	37	34	+3	39	Qualification for the national Europa League qualification tournament.
8	FC Lahti	27	9	9	9	29	36	−7	36	Qualification for the national Europa League qualification tournament.
9	SJK	27	7	9	11	18	29	−11	30	
10	RoPS	27	8	6	13	23	35	−12	30	
11	KPV (R)	27	7	4	16	32	47	−15	25	Qualification for the relegation play-offs
12	VPS (R)	27	3	10	14	30	45	−15	19	Relegation to the Ykkönen

Source: Veikkausliiga, Soccerway
Rules for classification: 1) Points; 2) Goal difference; 3) Goals scored; 4) Head-to-head points; 5) Head-to-head goal difference; 6) Head-to-head away goals scored; 7) Play-off
(Note: Play-off is only played if need to decide champion, teams for relegation or UEFA competition and will be played on a neutral ground).
(C) Champions; (O) Play-off winners; (R) Relegated

==== Results ====
Home \ Away	HFK	HJK	HON	MAR	ILV	INT	KPV	KPS	LAH	RPS	SJK	VPS
HIFK	—	0–2	2–0	1–1	2–2	1–1	3–2	1–1	0–1	1–0	1–0	2–1
HJK	1–1	—	0–1	2–1	0–0	2–1	3–1	1–1	4–0	2–2	2–2	1–1
FC Honka	3–0	0–1	—	1–3	1–2	3–2	0–1	1–2	2–0	1–0	0–0	1–1
IFK Mariehamn	1–3	0–2	2–2	—	0–1	1–2	3–0	3–4	0–1	2–0	1–0	1–0
Ilves	3–1	1–1	1–1	0–0	—	0–1	4–2	0–2	1–0	2–2	3–0	0–0
FC Inter	3–2	4–1	3–1	1–0	2–3	—	2–1	1–0	2–0	3–0	1–2	1–1
KPV	1–1	2–1	0–1	0–4	0–2	1–3	—	2–1	0–0	0–1	1–2	2–1
KuPS	1–1	0–0	0–3	0–0	1–0	2–0	3–1	—	5–1	2–2	0–1	5–0
FC Lahti	0–0	3–0	3–2	0–1	1–0	1–1	1–0	3–3	—	1–2	1–1	1–1
RoPS	1–0	0–1	1–2	1–2	0–1	0–2	0–0	0–1	3–0	—	1–1	2–1
SJK	1–0	0–0	1–2	0–2	0–1	2–1	1–0	1–3	0–2	0–0	—	1–0
VPS	3–2	1–1	2–3	2–1	1–2	1–2	2–2	1–2	1–1	0–1	1–1	—

Source: Veikkausliiga
Legend: Blue = home team win; Yellow = draw; Red = away team win.

=== European competition ===
Five teams will play for a spot in the 2020–21 UEFA Europa League first qualifying round.

23 October 2019
18:30 EET (UTC+2)

HJK	2–2 (a.e.t.)	FC Lahti
P. Forsell 33' (pen.); Mensah 37'	Report	Josu 68' (pen.); Assehnoun 78'
Penalties
	4–2

Telia 5G -areena, Helsinki
Referee: Mattias Gestranius
23 October 2019
18:30 EET (UTC+2)

IFK Mariehamn	0–0 (a.e.t.)	HIFK
	Report
Penalties
	4–2

Wiklöf Holding Arena, Mariehamn
Referee: Mohammed Al-Emara
27 October 2019

HJK	1–2 (a.e.t.)	IFK Mariehamn
Parra 16'	Report	M'Boma 68'; Ketting 110'

Telia 5G -areena, Helsinki
Referee: Antti Munukka

==== Bracket ====
Quarterfinals
23 October 2019
HJK	2(4)
FC Lahti	2(2)
23 October 2019
IFK Mariehamn	0(4)
HIFK	0(2)

Semifinals
27 October 2019
HJK	1
IFK Mariehamn	2

Final
IFK Mariehamn	1	0	1
FC Honka	2	1	3

==== Final stage ====
Team 1	Agg.	Team 2	1st leg	2nd leg
IFK Mariehamn	1–3	FC Honka	1–2	0–1

30 October 2019

IFK Mariehamn	1–2	FC Honka
	Report

Wiklöf Holding Arena, Mariehamn
Referee: Joni Hyytiä
3 November 2019

FC Honka	0–1	IFK Mariehamn
	Report

Tapiolan Urheilupuisto, Espoo
Referee: Petri Viljanen

=== Relegation play-offs ===
24 October 2019
18:30 EET (UTC+2)

TPS	0–0	KPV
	Report

Veritas Stadion, Turku
Attendance: 3,376
Referee: Kalle Mäkinen
27 October 2019
17:00 EET (UTC+2)

KPV	0–3	TPS
	Report	Ääritalo 44'; Jakonen 67'; Duah 90+2'

Kokkolan keskuskenttä, Kokkola
Attendance: 1,200
Referee: Ville Nevalainen

== Season statistics ==
=== Top scorers ===
Final standings

Rank	Player	Club	Goals
1	(Slovenia) Filip Valenčič	Inter Turku	16
2	(Finland) Lauri Ala-Myllymäki	Ilves	12
2	(Spain) Borjas Martín	Honka	12
4	(Finland) Timo Furuholm	Inter Turku	10
4	(Brazil) Tiquinho	HIFK	10
6	(Brazil) Luís Henrique	HIFK	8
6	(Ukraine) Denys Oliynyk	SJK	8
6	(Brazil) Lucas Rangel	KuPS	8

== Awards ==
=== Annual awards ===
Award	Winner	Club
Player of the Year	(Slovenia) Filip Valenčič	Inter Turku
Goalkeeper of the Year	(Finland) Mika Hilander	Ilves
Defender of the Year	(Colombia) Luis Carlos Murillo	KuPS
Midfielder of the Year	(Finland) Petteri Pennanen	KuPS
Striker of the Year	(Slovenia) Filip Valenčič	Inter Turku
Breakthrough of the Year	(Brazil) Jair	Ilves
Coach of the Year	(Finland) Jonas Rantanen	HJK

=== Team of the Year ===

Team of the Year
Goalkeeper	(Finland) Mika Hilander (Ilves)			
Defence	(Finland) Felipe Aspegren (Ilves)	(Senegal) Babacar Diallo (KuPS)	(Ghana) Baba Mensah (Ilves)	(Colombia) Luis Carlos Murillo (HJK)
Midfield	(Finland) Niko Markkula (Inter Turku)	(Finland) Ville Saxman (KuPS)	(Finland) Lauri Ala-Myllymäki (Ilves)	(Finland) Petteri Pennanen (KuPs)
Attack	(Slovenia) Filip Valenčič (Inter Turku)		(Spain) Borjas Martín (Honka)	

== Attendances ==
No.	Club	Average	Highest
1	HJK	5,007	10,251
2	Ilves	4,237	5,135
3	Inter Turku	3,243	9,125
4	SJK	2,827	4,059
5	KuPS	2,814	7,114
6	HIFK	2,298	10,256
7	Lahti	2,238	3,454
8	VPS	2,093	3,432
9	Honka	2,083	4,219
10	KPV	1,733	3,018
11	RoPS	1,569	3,112
12	Mariehamn	1,148	1,405
