= Pallohonka =

Finnish football club

- Full name: Pallohonka Juniorit
- Founded: 2009
- Ground: Otaniemen urheilukeskus, Otaniemi, Espoo, Finland
- Head Coach: Vesa Vasara
- Coach: Gert Remmel; Jarkko Tuomisto
- League: Kakkonen
- 2011: 5th – Kakkonen (Group A)
| Home colours | Away colours |

Pallohonka (also known as Honka Akatemia or Honka II) is a football club from Espoo in Finland. The club was formed in 2009 and their home ground is at the Otaniemen urheilukeskus, Otaniemi. Pallohonka is the reserve team of FC Honka and currently plays in the Kakkonen, or the third level of football in Finland.

== Season to season ==
| Season | Level | Division | Section | Administration | Position | Movements |
|---|---|---|---|---|---|---|
| 2009 | Tier 3 | Kakkonen (Second Division) | Group B | Finnish FA (Suomen Pallolitto) | 6th | |
| 2010 | Tier 3 | Kakkonen (Second Division) | Group B | Finnish FA (Suomen Pallolitto) | 5th | |
| 2011 | Tier 3 | Kakkonen (Second Division) | Group A | Finnish FA (Suomen Pallolitto) | 5th | |
| 2012 | Tier 3 | Kakkonen (Second Division) | Group A | Finnish FA (Suomen Pallolitto) | 7th | |

- 4 seasons in Kakkonen

== 2010 season ==
Pallohonka competed in Group B (Lohko B) of the Kakkonen administered by the Football Association of Finland (Suomen Palloliitto) . This is the third highest tier in the Finnish football system. In 2009 Pallohonka finished in sixth position in the Kakkonen section.

== References and sources ==
- FC Honka – official website
- Finnish Wikipedia
- Tulospalvelu
