= 2017 RoPS season =

RoPS
2017 season
- Chairman: Risto Niva
- Manager: Juha Malinen
- Stadium: Keskuskenttä
- Veikkausliiga: 7th
- Finnish Cup: Quarterfinal Play-offs vs SJK
- Top goalscorer: League: Emeka Friday Eze (7); All: Simo Roiha (12)
Home colours	Away colours

The 2017 season is RoPS's 5th Veikkausliiga season since their promotion back to the top flight in 2012.

== Squad ==
As of 31 August 2017

Note: Flags indicate national team as defined under FIFA eligibility rules; some limited exceptions apply. Players may hold more than one non-FIFA nationality.

No.	Pos.	Nation	Player
2	MF	NGR	Sani Kaita
4	MF	FIN	Antti Okkonen (Captain)
5	DF	SRB	Ivan Tatomirović
6	MF	FIN	Eerik Kantola
7	MF	CHI	Mota
8	DF	NED	Nathaniël Will
10	FW	AZE	Cem Felek
11	FW	GHA	Glenn Gabriel
12	GK	FIN	Juhani Kangas
13	DF	FIN	Lassi Järvenpää
14	MF	FIN	Eetu Muinonen
15	DF	FIN	Leo Väisänen

No.	Pos.	Nation	Player
16	FW	FIN	Jarkko Luiro
17	MF	FIN	Anselmi Nurmela
18	DF	FIN	Juho Hyvärinen
20	FW	FIN	Simo Roiha
21	MF	FIN	Aapo Heikkilä
22	FW	FIN	Sakari Tukiainen
24	MF	FIN	Lassi Lappalainen (on loan from HJK)
25	GK	ESP	Antonio Reguero
27	MF	FIN	Rasmus Degerman
47	DF	FIN	Juuso Hämäläinen
77	FW	FIN	Timo Stavitski

== Transfers ==
=== Winter ===
In: Note: Flags indicate national team as defined under FIFA eligibility rules; some limited exceptions apply. Players may hold more than one non-FIFA nationality.

No.	Pos.	Nation	Player
2	MF	NGR	Sani Kaita (from (Finland) JS Hercules)
5	DF	SRB	Ivan Tatomirović (from (Finland) HJK)
9	FW	NGR	Emeka Friday Eze (from (Cameroon) Aigle Royal Menoua)
10	FW	AZE	Cem Felek (from (Turkey) Centone Karagümrük)
15	DF	FIN	Leo Väisänen (from (Finland) PK-35 Vantaa)
17	MF	FIN	Anselmi Nurmela (from (Finland) AC Oulu)
22	FW	FIN	Sakari Tukiainen (from (Estonia) Flora)
23	MF	FIN	Saku Ylätupa (loan from (Finland) HJK)
30	DF	GHA	David Addy (from (India) Delhi Dynamos)
77	FW	FIN	Timo Stavitski (from (Finland) HJK)

Out: Note: Flags indicate national team as defined under FIFA eligibility rules; some limited exceptions apply. Players may hold more than one non-FIFA nationality.

No.	Pos.	Nation	Player
1	GK	USA	Tyler Back
3	DF	FIN	Jarkko Lahdenmäki (to (Norway) Fredrikstad)
5	DF	FIN	Janne Saksela (to (Netherlands) Sparta Rotterdam)
6	MF	FIN	Juha Pirinen (to (Finland) HJK)
7	MF	FIN	Mika Mäkitalo (to (Finland) Inter Turku)
10	FW	CMR	Jean Fridolin Nganbe Nganbe
16	DF	FIN	Ville Saxman (to (Finland) KuPS)
17	MF	GAM	Mamut Saine
19	FW	GHA	Ransford Osei
22	GK	BRA	Ricardo (to (Norway) Bodø/Glimt)
23	MF	SVK	Michal Mravec (to (Finland) KPV Kokkola)
77	MF	ESP	José Galán (to (Spain) Hospitalet)
85	MF	USA	Will John
86	DF	GAM	Abdou Jammeh (to (Qatar) Al-Shamal)
99	FW	EST	Albert Prosa (to (Estonia) FCI Tallinn)

=== Summer ===
In: Note: Flags indicate national team as defined under FIFA eligibility rules; some limited exceptions apply. Players may hold more than one non-FIFA nationality.

No.	Pos.	Nation	Player
7	MF	CHI	Mota (from (Ecuador) Clan Juvenil)
8	DF	NED	Nathaniël Will (from (Netherlands) De Graafschap)
11	FW	GHA	Glenn Gabriel
19	MF	CAN	Charlie Trafford (from (Poland) Sandecja Nowy Sącz)
24	MF	FIN	Lassi Lappalainen (loan from (Finland) HJK)

Out: Note: Flags indicate national team as defined under FIFA eligibility rules; some limited exceptions apply. Players may hold more than one non-FIFA nationality.

No.	Pos.	Nation	Player
7	MF	FIN	Pyry Hannola (to (Denmark) Midtjylland)
8	MF	FIN	Robert Taylor (to (Sweden) AIK)
9	FW	NGR	Emeka Friday Eze (to (Austria) Sturm Graz)
19	MF	FIN	Veka Pyyny
19	MF	CAN	Charlie Trafford (to (Scotland) Inverness Caledonian Thistle)
23	MF	FIN	Saku Ylätupa (loan return to (Finland) HJK)
30	DF	GHA	David Addy (to (Latvia) Riga)

== Competitions ==
=== Veikkausliiga ===
==== League table ====
Pos	Team	Pld	W	D	L	GF	GA	GD	Pts
5	IFK Mariehamn	33	13	10	10	44	42	+2	49
6	SJK	33	13	8	12	42	47	−5	47
7	RoPS	33	12	6	15	43	51	−8	42
8	VPS	33	9	12	12	38	51	−13	39
9	Inter Turku	33	10	8	15	54	57	−3	38

Updated to match(es) played on 28 October 2017. Source: Veikkausliiga (in Finnish), Soccerway
Rules for classification: 1) Points; 2) Goal difference; 3) Goals scored; 4) Head-to-head points; 5) Head-to-head goal difference; 6) Head-to-head away goals scored; 7) Play-off
(Note: Play-off is only played if need to decide champion, teams for relegation or UEFA competition and will be played on a neutral ground).

==== Results summary ====
Overall								Home						Away					
Pld	W	D	L	GF	GA	GD	Pts	W	D	L	GF	GA	GD	W	D	L	GF	GA	GD
33	12	6	15	40	51	−11	42	9	1	7	24	24	0	3	5	8	16	27	−11

Last updated: 28 October 2017.
Source: See Results

==== Results by matchday ====
Matchday	1	2	3	4	5	6	7	8	9	10	11	12	13	14	15	16	17	18	19	20	21	22	23	24	25	26	27	28	29	30	31	32	33
Ground	A	H	A	H	A	H	A	H	H	A	H	H	A	H	A	H	A	H	A	A	H	A	A	H	H	A	H	A	H	A	H	H	A
Result	L	L	W	W	L	W	L	W	L	L	L	W	L	W	L	D	D	L	D	L	W	W	L	W	L	L	L	D	W	D	W	L	W

Updated to match(es) played on 28 October 2017. Source: See results
A = Away; H = Home; W = Win; D = Draw; L = Loss

==== Results ====
12 April 2017 1	Inter Turku	6 – 2	RoPS	Turku
18:30 EEST (UTC+3)	Henrique 15'; Mäkitalo 20'; Kuqi 39', 45', 47'; Furuholm 67'	Report	Stavitski 58'; Taylor 86'	Stadium: Veritas Stadion; Attendance: 2,768; Referee: Mikko Mörö

17 April 2017 2	RoPS	2 – 4	VPS	Rovaniemi
16:00 EEST (UTC+3)	Ylätupa 26', 32'; L.Järvenpää (yellow card) 52'; Okkonen (yellow card) 75'	Report	J.Engström 21'; J.Vahtera 53' (pen.); Böling (yellow card) 61'; Morrissey 69'; Lampi (yellow card) 77'; Hakola 88'	Stadium: Rovaniemen keskuskenttä Attendance: 1,310; Referee: Antti Munukka

22 April 2017 3	Ilves	0 – 2	RoPS	Tampere
16:00 EEST (UTC+3)	Matrone (yellow card) 74'; Aspegren (yellow card) 76'	Report	Taylor 17' (pen.); Kaita 79'; Reguero (yellow card) 81'; Eze (yellow card) 84'	Stadium: Tammelan Stadion; Attendance: 2,813; Referee: Mikko Mörö

29 April 2017 4	RoPS	3 – 1	PS Kemi	Rovaniemi
16:00 EEST (UTC+3)	Addy 44' (pen.); S.Roiha 50'; Eze 72'	Report	Valenčič 8'; Ceesay (yellow card) 38'; Zea (yellow card) 40'; Guevara (yellow card) 55'; Mansally (yellow card) 90+4'	Stadium: Rovaniemen keskuskenttä Attendance: 1,443; Referee: Jani Laaksonen

6 May 2017 5	HIFK	1 – 0	RoPS	Helsinki
18:00 EEST (UTC+3)	Forssell 32'	Report		Stadium: Telia 5G -areena Attendance: 2,372; Referee: Jari Järvinen

12 May 2017 6	RoPS	1 – 0	Lahti	Rovaniemi
18:30 EEST (UTC+3)	L.Järvenpää 31'	Report	Helmke (yellow card) 90'	Stadium: Rovaniemen keskuskenttä Attendance: 1,051; Referee: Oskari Hämäläinen

19 May 2017 7	SJK	3 – 0	RoPS	Seinäjoki
20:00 EEST (UTC+3)	Ylätupa 23' (o.g.); Mboma 25', 73'	Report	Eze (yellow card) 57'	Stadium: OmaSP Stadion; Attendance: 3,644; Referee: Marko Grönholm

24 May 2017 8	RoPS	2 – 1	JJK	Rovaniemi
18:30 EEST (UTC+3)	Eze 20'; Tatomirović 41'	Report	E.Ahde 64'; Kari (yellow card) 73'; Tapaninen (yellow card) 90+1'	Stadium: Rovaniemen keskuskenttä Attendance: 1,364; Referee: Dennis Antamo

27 May 2017 9	RoPS	0 – 1	KuPS	Rovaniemi
17:00 EEST (UTC+3)	Kaita (yellow card) 23'	Report	Purje 10' (yellow card) 85'	Stadium: Rovaniemen keskuskenttä Attendance: 1,253; Referee: Toni Pohjoismäki

31 May 2017 10	IFK Mariehamn	2 – 1	RoPS	Mariehamn
18:30 EEST (UTC+3)	Ekhalie 10' (yellow card) 67'; Lyyski 64'	Report	A.Nurmela (yellow card) 54'; Taylor 58'	Stadium: Wiklöf Holding Arena; Attendance: 1,011; Referee: Dennis Antamo

4 June 2017 11	RoPS	1 – 4	HJK	Rovaniemi
18:30 EEST (UTC+3)	S.Roiha 63'; Addy (yellow card) 82'	Report	Eze 18' (o.g.); Yaghoubi (yellow card) 46' (goal) 64'; Mensah 61'; Morelos 90+2'	Stadium: Rovaniemen keskuskenttä Attendance: 1,465; Referee: Jari Järvinen

17 June 2017 12	RoPS	2 – 0	Inter Turku	Rovaniemi
15:00 EEST (UTC+3)	Eze 61'; S.Roiha 89'	Report	Kanakoudis (yellow card) 63'; Henrique (yellow card) 70'; Kauppi (yellow card) 88'	Stadium: Rovaniemen keskuskenttä Attendance: 1,427; Referee: Antti Munukka

22 June 2017 13	VPS	1 – 0	RoPS	Vaasa
18:30 EEST (UTC+3)	Jürgenson 45+1'	Report	Addy (yellow card) 45'; Tatomirović (yellow card) 52'; Okkonen (yellow card) 63'; Ylätupa (yellow card) 69'	Stadium: Hietalahti Stadium; Attendance: 1,896; Referee: Jani Laaksonen

26 June 2017 14	RoPS	1 – 0	Ilves	Rovaniemi
18:30 EEST (UTC+3)	Okkonen (yellow card) 21'; J.Hämäläinen (yellow card) 65'; Matrone 78' (o.g.)	Report	Matrone (yellow card) 75'	Stadium: Rovaniemen keskuskenttä Attendance: 1,242; Referee: Dennis Antamo

29 June 2017 15	PS Kemi	1 – 1	RoPS	Kemi
18:30 EEST (UTC+3)	Mansally 31' (yellow card) 62'; Valenčič (yellow card) 52'; Guevara (yellow card) 65'; A.Gullsten (yellow card) 77'	Report	Eze (yellow card) 45+1'; Okkonen (yellow card) 52'; L.Väisänen 55'; A.Nurmela (yellow card) 77'	Stadium: Sauvosaaren Urheilupuisto; Attendance: 3,325; Referee: Mikko Mörö

8 July 2017 16	RoPS	2 – 2	HIFK	Rovaniemi
17:00 EEST (UTC+3)	Ylätupa 3'; Eze (yellow card) 39' (goal) 85' (pen.)	Report	Forssell 10'; Sihvola 45'; Ristola (yellow card) 85'	Stadium: Rovaniemen keskuskenttä Attendance: 2,863; Referee: Mikko Mörö

16 July 2017 17	Lahti	1 – 1	RoPS	Lahti
18:30 EEST (UTC+3)	Stênio (yellow card) 30'; Simonovski (yellow card) 45+1' (goal) 70'; Helmke (yellow card) 90+4'	Report	Trafford (yellow card) 14'; Eze 42'	Stadium: Lahti Stadium; Attendance: 4,099; Referee: Antti Munukka

23 July 2017 18	RoPS	1 – 2	SJK	Rovaniemi
18:30 EEST (UTC+3)	L.Väisänen (yellow card) 30'; Lappalainen 75'; Stavitski (yellow card) 88'	Report	Vales (yellow card) 33'; Arimany (yellow card) 41'; A.Nurmela 53' (o.g.); Hetemaj (yellow card) 77'; Malolo 83'; Aksalu (yellow card) 90+3'	Stadium: Rovaniemen keskuskenttä Attendance: 2,356; Referee: Dennis Antamo

31 July 2017 19	JJK	1 – 1	RoPS	Jyväskylä
18:30 EEST (UTC+3)	Tapaninen (yellow card) 50'; S.Jovović 56'; S.Suoraniemi (yellow card) 90+2'	Report	J.Hyvärinen 80'	Stadium: Harjun stadion Attendance: 1,587; Referee: Dennis Antamo

5 August 2017 20	KuPS	3 – 0	RoPS	Kuopio
17:00 EEST (UTC+3)	Sorsa (yellow card) 3'; Saxman 49'; U.Nissilä 62'; I.Niskanen 80'	Report	Trafford (yellow card) 82'	Stadium: Kuopio Football Stadium; Attendance: 2,130; Referee: Mattias Gestranius

10 August 2017 21	RoPS	3 – 0	IFK Mariehamn	Rovaniemi
18:30 EEST (UTC+3)	Trafford 11'; Tatomirović (yellow card) 45+1'; S.Roiha 48'; Eze 79'	Report	A.Mäenpää (yellow card) 40'; Span (yellow card) 88'	Stadium: Rovaniemen keskuskenttä Attendance: 1,422; Referee: Oskari Hämäläinen

14 August 2017 21	HJK	0 – 1	RoPS	Helsinki
16:30 EEST (UTC+3)	Pelvas (yellow card) 34'; Jalasto (yellow card) 54'; Dahlström (yellow card) 67'	Report	Trafford (yellow card) 36'; J.Hämäläinen (yellow card) 45+2'; Eze 68'; Stavitski (yellow card) 90+1'	Stadium: Telia 5G -areena Attendance: 9,427; Referee: Atte Jussila

19 August 2017 23	HIFK	1 – 0	RoPS	Helsinki
17:00 EEST (UTC+3)	Sihvola 58'; Jurvainen (yellow card) 76'	Report		Stadium: Telia 5G -areena Attendance: 4,705; Referee: Jari Järvinen

26 August 2017 24	RoPS	4 – 2	Inter Turku	Rovaniemi
17:00 EEST (UTC+3)	Will 4'; Stavitski 58', 68'; S.Tukiainen 63' (yellow card) 89'	Report	Henrique (yellow card) 18'; Källman 22'; Mäntylä (yellow card) 34'; Mäkitalo (yellow card) 45+2'; Nyman 80'; Lehtonen (yellow card) 90+2'	Stadium: Rovaniemen keskuskenttä Attendance: 1,288; Referee: Kalle Mäkinen

7 September 2017 25	RoPS	0 – 1	PS Kemi	Rovaniemi
18:30 EEST (UTC+3)	Okkonen (yellow card) 90'	Report	Mansally (yellow card) 16'; Ademi 23'; Kaljumäe (yellow card) 42'; Ojala (yellow card) 58'; Guevara (yellow card) 63'; A.Gullsten (yellow card) 74'; Ceesay (yellow card) 88'	Stadium: Rovaniemen keskuskenttä Attendance: 2,921; Referee: Jari Järvinen

10 September 2017 26	Ilves	3 – 2	RoPS	Tampere
15:00 EEST (UTC+3)	Tuco 7' (pen.), 83', 87' (yellow card) 55'; Mensah (yellow card) 57'; Hynynen (yellow card) 89'	Report	J.Hyvärinen (yellow card) 16'; Tatomirović (yellow card) 23'; S.Roiha 29' (pen.); Stavitski (yellow card) 47'; A.Nurmela 49' (yellow card) 90+4'	Stadium: Tammelan Stadion; Attendance: 2,547; Referee: Oskari Hämäläinen

16 September 2017 27	RoPS	0 – 3	SJK	Rovaniemi
17:00 EEST (UTC+3)	S.Roiha (yellow card) 24' (yellow-red card) 65'; Stavitski (yellow card) 64'; L.Väisänen (yellow card) 74'	Report	Mero 9'; Laaksonen (yellow card) 39'; J.Sundman (yellow card) 54'; Bardanca (yellow card) 75'; Ions 84'; T.Hradecky (yellow card) 87'; Sarajärvi 90+2'	Stadium: Rovaniemen keskuskenttä Attendance: 1,412; Referee: Atte Jussila

24 September 2017 28	Lahti	1 – 1	RoPS	Lahti
18:30 EEST (UTC+3)	Simonovski 60'	Report	Tatomirović 71'	Stadium: Lahti Stadium; Attendance: 2,552; Referee: Antti Munukka

30 September 2017 29	RoPS	2 – 0	JJK	Rovaniemi
17:00 EEST (UTC+3)	Lappalainen 6', 83'; J.Hämäläinen (yellow card) 79'; Okkonen (yellow card) 86'	Report	Tapaninen (yellow card) 73'	Stadium: Rovaniemen keskuskenttä Attendance: 1,302; Referee: Atte Jussila

12 October 2017 30	KuPS	1 – 1	RoPS	Kuopio
18:30 EEST (UTC+3)	U.Nissilä 18'	Report	Will (yellow card) 89'; Muinonen 90+4'	Stadium: Kuopio Football Stadium; Attendance: 4,432; Referee: Kalle Mäkinen

15 October 2017 31	RoPS	3 – 0	VPS	Rovaniemi
15:00 EEST (UTC+3)	Muinonen 7', 48'; Lappalainen 41'	Report	Lampi (yellow card) 60'	Stadium: Rovaniemen keskuskenttä Attendance: 1,119; Referee: Antti Munukka

20 October 2017 32	RoPS	0 – 3	IFK Mariehamn	Rovaniemi
18:30 EEST (UTC+3)	Stavitski (yellow card) 42'	Report	Sid 1' (yellow card) 53'; Kangaskolkka 72'; Span 90+1'	Stadium: Rovaniemen keskuskenttä Attendance: 1,385; Referee: Joni Hyytiä

28 October 2017 33	HJK	2 – 3	RoPS	Helsinki
14:00 EEST (UTC+3)	Pelvas 41'; Rafinha 58'	Report	S.Tukiainen 19', 86'; S.Roiha 64'	Stadium: Telia 5G -areena Attendance: 3,102; Referee: Ville Nevalainen

=== Finnish Cup ===
==== Sixth Round ====
Team	Pld	W	D	L	GF	GA	GD	Pts
KPV	5	5	0	0	14	6	+8	15
RoPS	5	3	1	1	17	6	+11	10
PS Kemi	5	2	2	1	11	6	+5	8
AC Oulu	5	2	0	3	12	9	+3	6
OPS	5	1	1	3	3	18	−15	4
HauPa	5	0	0	5	7	19	−12	0

28 January 2017 1	RoPS	3 – 0	HauPa	Rovaniemi
14:00 EET (UTC+2)	Taylor 17'; Felek (yellow card) 28'; Kaita (yellow card) 45'; Tukiainen 61'; Roiha 83'	Report	M.Paldan (yellow card) 52'	Stadium: Ounashalli TN; Attendance: 310; Referee: Esa Suoyrjö

6 February 2017 2	AC Oulu	1 – 2	RoPS	Oulu
18:30 EET (UTC+2)	Pietola 61'	Report	Roiha 69', 71'; A.Nurmela (yellow card) 83'; Taylor (yellow card) 89'	Stadium: Heinäpää PH TN; Attendance: 600; Referee: Antti Munukka

11 February 2017 3	RoPS	9 – 0	OPS	Rovaniemi
12:00 EET (UTC+2)	Tukiainen 4'; Hannola 13'; Roiha 14', 18', 39'; Jibrin 21' (o.g.); Ibiyomi 69'; Felek 85'; Luiro 90+1'	Report	F.Orishani (yellow card) 52'	Stadium: Ounashalli TN; Attendance: 272; Referee: Oliver Reitala

18 February 2017 4	KPV	4 – 2	RoPS	Kokkola
17:00 EET (UTC+2)	Hohenthal 13'; K.Ågren (yellow card) 26'; V.Shevchenko (yellow card) 38'; Myntti 45+1', 53'; Mendy (yellow card) 55'; Hasanzada 79'	Report	Taylor 29', 39'; A.Ibiyomi (yellow card) 81'	Stadium: Kippari Hall; Attendance: 368; Referee: Daniel Enkvist

1 March 2017 5	RoPS	1 – 1	PS Kemi	Kajaani
18:00 EET (UTC+2)	Heikkilä 18'; J.Hämäläinen (yellow card) 23'; S.Roiha (yellow card) 65'; A.Heikkilä (yellow card) 66'; Okkonen (yellow card) 79'; S.Tukiainen (yellow card) 85'; Reguero (yellow card) 90+2'	Report	Ojala (yellow card) 42' (yellow-red card) 69'; Kaljumäe (yellow card) 51'; Valenčič 74'	Stadium: Pallohalli TN; Attendance: 200; Referee: Antti Munukka

==== Knockout stage ====
13 March 2017 Quarterfinal Play-offs	RoPS	0 – 2	SJK	Kemi
20:00 EET (UTC+2)		Report	Klinga 6' (yellow card) 75'; Guichón 57'	Stadium: Junkohalli TN; Attendance: 174; Referee: Toni Pohjoismäki

== Squad statistics ==
As of Match played 28 October 2017

=== Appearances and goals ===
No.	Pos	Nat	Player	Total		Veikkausliiga		Finnish Cup	
No.	Pos	Nat	Player	Apps	Goals	Apps	Goals	Apps	Goals
2	DF	(Nigeria) NGR	Sani Kaita	16	1	6+5	1	5	0
4	MF	(Finland) FIN	Antti Okkonen	27	0	25	0	2	0
5	DF	(Serbia) SRB	Ivan Tatomirović	27	1	27	1	0	0
6	MF	(Finland) FIN	Eerik Kantola	4	0	0+2	0	2	0
7	MF	(Chile) CHI	Mota	12	1	3+9	1	0	0
8	DF	(Netherlands) NED	Nathaniël Will	11	1	11	1	0	0
10	FW	(Azerbaijan) AZE	Cem Felek	15	1	3+8	0	2+2	1
11	FW	(Ghana) GHA	Glenn Gabriel	4	0	0+4	0	0	0
12	GK	(Finland) FIN	Juhani Kangas	1	0	0+1	0	0	0
13	DF	(Finland) FIN	Lassi Järvenpää	26	1	14+6	1	6	0
14	MF	(Finland) FIN	Eetu Muinonen	37	3	29+2	3	6	0
15	DF	(Finland) FIN	Leo Väisänen	22	1	19+3	1	0	0
16	FW	(Finland) FIN	Jarkko Luiro	5	1	0+1	0	0+4	1
17	MF	(Finland) FIN	Anselmi Nurmela	34	1	24+5	1	4+1	0
18	DF	(Finland) FIN	Juho Hyvärinen	23	1	15+3	1	5	0
20	FW	(Finland) FIN	Simo Roiha	35	12	21+8	6	6	6
21	MF	(Finland) FIN	Aapo Heikkilä	3	1	0+2	0	1	1
22	FW	(Finland) FIN	Sakari Tukiainen	32	5	6+20	3	6	2
24	MF	(Finland) FIN	Lassi Lappalainen	13	4	9+4	4	0	0
25	GK	(Spain) ESP	Antonio Reguero	39	0	33	0	6	0
27	MF	(Finland) FIN	Rasmus Degerman	1	0	0	0	0+1	0
47	DF	(Finland) FIN	Juuso Hämäläinen	34	0	28	0	6	0
77	FW	(Finland) FIN	Timo Stavitski	32	3	24+5	3	2+1	0
Players away from the club on loan:
Players who left RoPS during the season:
6	MF	(Nigeria) NGR	Michael Ibiyomi	4	1	0	0	2+2	1
7	MF	(Finland) FIN	Pyry Hannola	8	1	0+3	0	1+4	1
8	MF	(Finland) FIN	Robert Taylor	14	6	8+2	3	4	3
9	FW	(Nigeria) NGR	Emeka Friday Eze	21	7	21	7	0	0
19	MF	(Finland) FIN	Veka Pyyny	1	0	0	0	0+1	0
19	MF	(Canada) CAN	Charlie Trafford	6	1	6	1	0	0
23	MF	(Finland) FIN	Saku Ylätupa	17	3	15+2	3	0	0
30	DF	(Ghana) GHA	David Addy	15	1	15	1	0	0

=== Goal scorers ===
Place	Position	Nation	Number	Name	Veikkausliiga	Finnish Cup	Total
1	FW	(Finland)	20	Simo Roiha	6	6	12
2	FW	(Nigeria)	9	Emeka Friday Eze	7	0	7
3	MF	(Finland)	8	Robert Taylor	3	3	6
4	FW	(Finland)	22	Sakari Tukiainen	3	2	5
5	MF	(Finland)	24	Lassi Lappalainen	4	0	4
6	MF	(Finland)	23	Saku Ylätupa	3	0	3
6	FW	(Finland)	77	Timo Stavitski	3	0	3
6	MF	(Finland)	14	Eetu Muinonen	3	0	3
9				Own goal	1	1	2
10	DF	(Finland)	13	Lassi Järvenpää	1	0	1
10	DF	(Nigeria)	2	Sani Kaita	1	0	1
10	DF	(Ghana)	30	David Addy	1	0	1
10	DF	(Serbia)	5	Ivan Tatomirović	1	0	1
10	DF	(Finland)	15	Leo Väisänen	1	0	1
10	DF	(Finland)	18	Juho Hyvärinen	1	0	1
10	MF	(Canada)	19	Charlie Trafford	1	0	1
10	DF	(Netherlands)	8	Nathaniël Will	1	0	1
10	MF	(Finland)	17	Anselmi Nurmela	1	0	1
10	DF	(Serbia)	5	Ivan Tatomirović	1	0	1
10	MF	(Finland)	7	Pyry Hannola	0	1	1
10	FW	(Nigeria)	6	Michael Ibiyomi	0	1	1
10	FW	(Azerbaijan)	10	Cem Felek	0	1	1
10	FW	(Finland)	16	Jarkko Luiro	0	1	1
10	FW	(Finland)	21	Aapo Heikkilä	0	1	1
TOTALS					41	17	58

=== Disciplinary record ===
Number	Nation	Position	Name	Veikkausliiga		Finnish Cup		Total	
Number	Nation	Position	Name	Yellow card	Red card	Yellow card	Red card	Yellow card	Red card
2	(Nigeria)	MF	Sani Kaita	1	0	1	0	2	0
4	(Finland)	MF	Antti Okkonen	6	0	1	0	7	0
5	(Serbia)	DF	Ivan Tatomirović	3	0	0	0	3	0
6	(Nigeria)	MF	Michael Ibiyomi	0	0	1	0	1	0
8	(Finland)	MF	Robert Taylor	0	0	1	0	1	0
8	(Netherlands)	DF	Nathaniël Will	1	0	0	0	1	0
9	(Nigeria)	FW	Emeka Friday Eze	4	0	0	0	4	0
10	(Azerbaijan)	FW	Cem Felek	0	0	1	0	1	0
13	(Finland)	DF	Lassi Järvenpää	1	0	0	0	1	0
15	(Finland)	DF	Leo Väisänen	2	0	0	0	2	0
17	(Finland)	MF	Anselmi Nurmela	3	0	1	0	4	0
18	(Finland)	DF	Juho Hyvärinen	1	0	0	0	1	0
19	(Canada)	MF	Charlie Trafford	3	0	0	0	3	0
20	(Finland)	FW	Simo Roiha	2	1	1	0	3	1
21	(Finland)	MF	Aapo Heikkilä	0	0	1	0	1	0
22	(Finland)	FW	Sakari Tukiainen	0	0	1	0	1	0
23	(Finland)	MF	Saku Ylätupa	1	0	0	0	1	0
25	(Spain)	GK	Antonio Reguero	1	0	1	0	2	0
30	(Ghana)	DF	David Addy	2	0	0	0	2	0
47	(Finland)	DF	Juuso Hämäläinen	3	0	1	0	4	0
77	(Finland)	FW	Timo Stavitski	5	0	0	0	5	0
TOTALS				39	1	11	0	50	1
