= 2016–17 Finnish Cup =

Tournament details
- Country: Finland

Final positions
- Champions: HJK Helsinki
- Runners-up: SJK

Tournament statistics
- Matches played: 151
- Goals scored: 616 (4.08 per match)
- Top goal scorer(s): Juho Patola (Pallo-Iirot); Toni Tuominen (HauPa); 8 goals

The 2016–17 Finnish Cup (Suomen Cup) was the 63nd season of the Finnish Cup. It was the first edition of the tournament to be played on a fall-spring schedule, running from July to September of the following year. The introduction of this new competition format meant that the Finnish League Cup was discontinued.

HJK Helsinki won its 13th cup after defeating SJK in the final.

== Teams ==
Round	Dates	Clubs involved	Winners from previous round	New entries this round	Leagues entering this round
First round	29 Jul 2016 – 7 Aug 2016	12	−	12	Kolmonen and lower levels (12 teams)
Second round	27 Jul 2016 – 30 Aug 2016				Kolmonen and lower levels ( teams)
Third round	2 Sep 2016 – 2 Oct 2016	32	32	–	
Fourth round	5 Oct 2016 – 17 Oct 2016	16	16	32	Kakkonen ( teams); Ykkönen ( teams); Veikkausliiga ( teams)
Fifth round	20 Oct 2016 – 23 Oct 2016	8	8	4	Veikkausliiga (0 teams)
Sixth round (group stage)	20 Jan 2017 – 7 Mar 2017	30		–	
Quarter-finals	18 – 19 Mar 2017	8		–	

== First round ==
Team 1	Score	Team 2
29 July 2016
Jokerit FC (5)	2–0	Gnistan/Ogeli (4)
1 August 2016
KuKi (4)	3–4	Kings SC ()
2 August 2016
Pelikaani (6)	0–11	Töölön Taisto (4)
7 August 2016
GBK II (3)	0–11	JBK (3)
HAlku ()	0–6	FC Finnkurd ()
FC KaKe/Otsot ()	0–7	Toukolan Teräs ()

== Second round ==
Team 1	Score	Team 2
FC Kasiysi Rocky ()	w/o	HyPs (3)
27 July 2016
SJK Akatemia (2)	1–0	Närpes Kraft (2)
7 August 2016
KuuLa (6)	4–2	FC RP ()
8 August 2016
Pato ()	0–3	IF Gnistan (3)
9 August 2016
PETO/MJK (3)	0–6	FC Honka (2)
10 August 2016
SoPa (4)	1–5	TP-47 (3)
11 August 2016
HauPa (3)	4–0	OsPa ()
13 August 2016
LIP ()	2–1	PetPet (5)
16 August 2016
NoPs (4)	0–3	Klubi-04 (3)
JanPa ()	2–1 (a.e.t.)	EPS ()
OuTa (5)	0–5	KajHa (4)
FC Santa Claus (3)	1–0	JS Hercules (3)
17 August 2016
SC Riverball (4)	1–7	MP (2)
19 August 2016
SexyPöxyt (4)	8–0	FC POHU/Simpsons (6)
20 August 2016
FC LaPa (6)	0–10	JIPPO (3)
PEF (5)	0–2	Jokerit FC (5)
21 August 2016
Toukolan Teräs ()	3–1	LPS (4)
22 August 2016
SJK-j Apollo ()	3–1	JBK (3)
VG-62 (4)	2–5	P-Iirot (3)
23 August 2016
KY-Sport ()	3–2	MuSa (4)
KaaPs (6)	2–4	ÅIFK (3)
24 August 2016
NJS (3)	2–0	Töölön Taisto (4)
25 August 2016
OPS/Akatemia (4)	0–7	AC Takinkääntäjät (4)
AFC Keltik ()	1–6	Kings SC ()
27 August 2016
MynPa (5)	w/o	KaaPo (3)
SC Wolves ()	4–0	LieTo ()
RiPS (4)	1–5	FC Legirus Inter ()
28 August 2016
Kristallipalatsi (6)	1–6	FC Aztecas ()
APA ()	0–6	FC Finnkurd
29 August 2016
FC Kasiysi/KeKe ()	1–4	IF Gnistan II (5)
30 August 2016
Ponnistajat (7)	3–2	FC Viikingit (3)

== Third round ==
Team 1	Score	Team 2
Kings SC ()	w/o	IF Gnistan (3)
7 September 2016
JIPPO (3)	0–1	Klubi-04 (3)
10 September 2016
SJK Akatemia (2)	3–1	KajHa (4)
11 September 2016
NJS (3)	4–2	HyPs (4)
13 September 2016
Toukolan Teräs ()	1–0	Jokerit FC (5)
HauPa (3)	4–1	AC Takinkääntäjät (4)
JanPa ()	0–4	P-Iirot (3)
14 September 2016
TP-47 (3)	2–0	FC Santa Claus (3)
Ponnistajat (7)	1–2	FC Honka (2)
19 September 2016
FC Finnkurd ()	8–1	IF Gnistan II ()
28 September 2016
LIP ()	1–19	MP (2)
29 September 2016
KuuLa (6)	0–2	KY-Sport ()
SJK-j Apollo ()	1–2	PeFF (5)
ÅIFK (3)	3–1	KaaPo (3)
2 October 2016
FC Aztecas ()	0–3	SexyPöxyt (4)
SC Wolves ()	0–5	FC Legirus Inter ()

== Fourth round ==
Team 1	Score	Team 2
7 October 2016
ÅIFK (3)	1–2 (a.e.t.)	P-Iirot (3)
8 October 2016
Klubi-04 (3)	6–0	FC Finnkurd ()
11 October 2016
HauPa (3)	2–1	PeFF (5)
NJS (3)	5–0	KY-Sport ()
12 October 2016
MP (2)	2–1	SexyPöxyt (4)
13 October 2016
FC Legirus Inter ()	6–0	Toukolan Teräs ()
15 October 2016
SJK Akatemia (2)	2–1	TP-47 (3)

== Fifth round ==
Team 1	Score	Team 2
20 October 2016
Kings SC ()	0–5	MP (2)
21 October 2016
SJK Akatemia (2)	0–1	FC Legirus Inter ()
22 October 2016
HauPa (3)	3–0	NJS (3)
23 October 2016
P-Iirot (3)	2–1	Klubi-04 (3)

== Sixth round ==
=== Group stage ===
==== Group A ====
Team	Pld	W	D	L	GF	GA	GD	Pts
KPV	5	5	0	0	14	6	+8	15
RoPS	5	3	1	1	17	6	+11	10
PS Kemi	5	2	2	1	11	6	+5	8
AC Oulu	5	2	0	3	12	9	+3	6
OPS	5	1	1	3	3	18	−15	4
HauPa	5	0	0	5	7	19	−12	0

28 January 2017	RoPS	3–0	HauPa	Rovaniemi
14:00	Taylor 17'; Tukiainen 61'; Roiha 83'	Report		Stadium: Ounashalli TN; Attendance: 310; Referee: Esa Suoyrjö

28 January 2017	AC Oulu	4–0	OPS	Oulu
15:00	Pietola 4'; Viana 29'; Lappalainen 73'; Jovović 80'	Report		Stadium: Heinäpää PH TN; Attendance: 600; Referee: Tommi Grönman

29 January 2017	PS Kemi	2–3	KPV	Kemi
15:00	Ojala 75'; Gilligan 90' (pen.)	Report	Nando Cózar 33'; Sirbiladze 38', 77'	Stadium: Junkohalli TN; Attendance: 390; Referee: Janne Jussila

6 February 2017	AC Oulu	1–2	RoPS	Oulu
18:30	Pietola 61'	Report	Roiha 69', 71'	Stadium: Heinäpää PH TN; Attendance: 600; Referee: Antti Munukka

11 February 2017	RoPS	9–0	OPS	Rovaniemi
12:00	Tukiainen 4'; Hannola 13'; Roiha 14', 18', 39'; Jibrin 21' (o.g.); Ibiyomi 69'; Fələk 85'; Luiro 90+1'	Report		Stadium: Ounashalli TN; Attendance: 272; Referee: Oliver Reitala

11 February 2017	PS Kemi	2–1	AC Oulu	Kemi
15:00	Valenčič 20'; Karjalainen 75'	Report	Jovović 3'	Stadium: Junkohalli TN; Attendance: 415; Referee: Pietu Niinimäki

11 February 2017	KPV	2–1	HauPa	Kokkola
17:00	Savić 61'; Șevcenco 90+4'	Report	Stafsula 63' (pen.)	Stadium: Kippari-halli; Attendance: 280; Referee: Juuso Saarela

18 February 2017	HauPa	3–5	AC Oulu	Oulu
14:00	Kovalainen 15'; Tervonen 53'; Vilmunen 73'	Report	Autioniemi 14' (o.g.); Jair 31' (pen.); Pietola 36', 68'; Mustonen 90+3'	Stadium: Heinäpää PH TN; Attendance: 560; Referee: Pietu Niinimäki

18 February 2017	KPV	4–2	RoPS	Kokkola
17:00	Hohenthal 13'; Myntti 45+1', 53'; Hasanzada 79'	Report	Taylor 29', 39'	Stadium: Kippari Hall; Attendance: 368; Referee: Daniel Enkvist

19 February 2017	PS Kemi	0–0	OPS	Kemi
15:00		Report		Stadium: Junkohalli TN; Attendance: 273; Referee: Daniel Enkvist

25 February 2017	HauPa	1–6	PS Kemi	Oulu
14:00	Tuominen 58'	Report	Aalto 49', 69', 85'; Valenčič 60', 90+2'; Kaljumäe 73'	Stadium: Heinäpää PH TN; Attendance: 322; Referee: Atte Räinä

26 February 2017	OPS	0–3	KPV	Oulu
14:30		Report	Hasanzada 20'; Nando Cózar 25'; Schwalenstöcker 46'	Stadium: Heinäpää PH TN; Attendance: 70; Referee: Esa Suoyrjö

1 March 2017	RoPS	1–1	PS Kemi	Kajaani
18:00	Heikkilä 18'	Report	Valenčič 74'	Stadium: Pallohalli TN; Attendance: 200; Referee: Antti Munukka

4 March 2017	OPS	3–2	HauPa	Oulu
12:30	Haapala 52', 57' (pen.); Rounaja 72'	Report	Tuominen 16'; Stafsula 78' (pen.)	Stadium: Heinäpää PH TN; Attendance: 151; Referee: Atte Räinä

4 March 2017	AC Oulu	1–2	KPV	Oulu
15:00	Ramadingaye 79'	Report	Marsh 50', 53'	Stadium: Heinäpää PH TN; Attendance: 228; Referee: Mikko Leino

==== Group B ====
Team	Pld	W	D	L	GF	GA	GD	Pts
FF Jaro	5	4	0	1	18	4	+14	12
VPS	5	4	0	1	16	5	+11	12
SJK	5	3	0	2	20	6	+14	9
FC Jazz	5	2	0	3	8	19	−11	6
MuSa	5	1	0	4	3	14	−11	3
SJK Akatemia	5	1	0	4	9	26	−17	3

20 January 2017	SJK	7–0	SJK Akatemia	Seinäjoki
19:15	Ojala 15'; Ahde 32', 50'; Hetemaj 71' (pen.), 73', 90'; Klinga 89'	Report		Stadium: Wallsport Areena; Attendance: 402; Referee: Olli-Jussi Sariola

28 January 2017	FF Jaro	2–0	MuSa	Jakobstad
15:15	Häggblom 82', 90+3'	Report		Stadium: Tellushallen; Attendance: 440; Referee: Daniel Enkvist

28 January 2017	VPS	5–1	FC Jazz	Vaasa
17:45	Lähde 2'; Hakola 9'; Vahtera 27' (pen.); Clennon 51'; Kuusela 90' (o.g.)	Report	Laaksonen 48'	Stadium: Fennia Arena; Attendance: 172; Referee: Toni Pohjoismäki

3 February 2017	SJK Akatemia	3–7	VPS	Seinäjoki
19:15	McGiveron 52'; Viljanen 70', 87'	Report	Clennon 7'; Vahtera 24', 54', 59'; Lähde 50'; Morrissey 76'; Voutilainen 78'	Stadium: WallSport-Areena; Attendance: 205; Referee: Petri Viljanen

4 February 2017	FF Jaro	2–1	SJK	Jakobstad
15:15	Vidjeskog 6'; Häggblom 8'	Report	Hetemaj 83' (pen.)	Stadium: Tellushallen; Attendance: 601; Referee: Toni Pohjoismäki

5 February 2017	MuSa	0–3	FC Jazz	Pori
18:30		Report	Aftab 47', 61'; Laaksonen 54'	Stadium: Karhuhalli; Attendance: 620; Referee: Oskari Hämäläinen

11 February 2017	SJK	6–1	MuSa	Seinäjoki
14:15	Vales 37'; Hetemaj 45' (pen.); Klinga 50'; M'Boma 56'; Ahde 73'; Sarajärvi 83'	Report	Räisänen 31'	Stadium: WallSport-Areena; Attendance: 278; Referee: Atte Jussila

11 February 2017	VPS	1–0	FF Jaro	Vaasa
17:30	Clennon 25'	Report		Stadium: Fennia Arena; Attendance: 403; Referee: Petri Viljanen

11 February 2017	FC Jazz	3–2	SJK Akatemia	Pori
18:30	Lehtinen 27'; Ablade 77'; Mäkelä 88'	Report	Kujanpää 15'; Viljanen 39'	Stadium: Karhuhalli; Attendance: 154; Referee: Lina Lehtovaara

17 February 2017	SJK Akatemia	1–8	FF Jaro	Seinäjoki
19:15	Kujanpää 86' (pen.)	Report	Eissele 12', 50', 68', 77'; Kula 18'; Katidis 43', 79' (pen.); Niang 69'	Stadium: WallSport-Areena; Attendance: 149; Referee: Rasmus Hietanen

18 February 2017	FC Jazz	0–6	SJK	Pori
18:30		Report	Laaksonen 33', 68'; Meura 45+1' (o.g.), 85' (o.g.); Ions 54'; Ahde 78'	Stadium: Karhuhalli; Attendance: 237; Referee: Jesse Kananen

19 February 2017	VPS	0–1	MuSa	Vaasa
13:30		Report	Rantala 71'	Stadium: Fennia Arena; Attendance: 164; Referee: Mikko Juusola

1 March 2017	SJK	0–3	VPS	Seinäjoki
19:00		Report	Vahtera 16' (pen.); Morrissey 22', 38'	Stadium: WallSport-Areena; Attendance: 498; Referee: Kalle Mäkinen

4 March 2017	MuSa	1–3	SJK Akatemia	Pori
13:30	Lähde 87' (pen.)	Report	McGiveron 3'; Viljanen 38'; Kujanpää 63'	Stadium: Pori Urheilukeskus TN; Attendance: 101; Referee: Jesse Kananen

4 March 2017	FF Jaro	6–1	FC Jazz	Jakobstad
15:15	Katidis 13', 78'; Eissele 26', 60', 75'; Häggblom 89'	Report	Mäkelä 25'	Stadium: Tellushallen; Attendance: 537; Referee: Mikko Juusola

==== Group C ====
Team	Pld	W	D	L	GF	GA	GD	Pts
HJK	5	5	0	0	18	2	+16	15
FC Honka	5	4	0	1	11	3	+8	12
GrIFK	5	1	2	2	6	9	−3	5
HIFK	5	1	1	3	5	11	−6	4
IF Gnistan	5	1	1	3	2	8	−6	4
KTP	5	0	2	3	2	11	−9	2

21 January 2017	GrIFK	2–2	HIFK	Helsinki
12:00	Pirttijoki 70'; Väyrynen 90+3'	Report	Langhoff 36', 88'	Stadium: Tali halli TN; Attendance: 401; Referee: Marko Grönholm

28 January 2017	HJK	3–2	FC Honka	Helsinki
15:00	Pelvas 39' (pen.), 50'; Morelos 84'	Report	Ivanov 65' (pen.); Douglas da Silva 90+2'	Stadium: Sonera Stadium; Attendance: 852; Referee: Jari Järvinen

28 January 2017	IF Gnistan	0–0	KTP	Helsinki
18:00		Report		Stadium: Tali halli TN; Attendance: 175; Referee: Mikko Mörö

2 February 2017	IF Gnistan	0–4	HJK	Helsinki
17:00		Report	Pelvas 12', 45'; Rafinha 43'; Dahlström 65' (pen.)	Stadium: Tali halli TN; Attendance: 534; Referee: Mohammed Al-Emara

4 February 2017	FC Honka	3–0	HIFK	Espoo
13:00	Korhonen 26'; Ivanov 28'; Ömer 84'	Report		Stadium: eSports Arena; Attendance: 200; Referee: Jari Järvinen

4 February 2017	KTP	2–2	GrIFK	Kotka
15:00	Celik 9'; Lucas 19'	Report	Langhoff 31'; Seferi 81'	Stadium: Arto Tolsa Areena; Attendance: 255

11 February 2017	HIFK	0–2	IF Gnistan	Helsinki
11:00		Report	Kaukomaa 77'; Jouini 83'	Stadium: Tali halli TN; Attendance: 307; Referee: Mohammed Al-Emara

11 February 2017	GrIFK	0–2	FC Honka	Espoo
17:00		Report	Saarinen 28'; Äijälä 87'	Stadium: Esport Arena; Attendance: 160; Referee: Antti Munukka

13 February 2017	HJK	4–0	KTP	Helsinki
19:00	Tanaka 61'; Morelos 75'; Dahlström 76'; Lappalainen 80'	Report		Stadium: Sonera Stadium; Attendance: 500; Referee: Mikko Mörö

18 February 2017	GrIFK	0–3	HJK	Helsinki
11:00		Report	Morelos 31'; Yaghoubi 52' (pen.); Tanaka 79'	Stadium: Tali halli TN; Attendance: 376; Referee: Mohammed Al-Emara

18 February 2017	HIFK	3–0	KTP	Helsinki
16:00	Ristola 27'; Mäkelä 75'; Ulmanen 88'	Report		Stadium: Tali halli TN; Attendance: 262; Referee: Juuso Vuorinen

18 February 2017	FC Honka	2–0	IF Gnistan	Espoo
17:00	Douglas Silveira 9'; Liikonen 74'	Report		Stadium: Esport Arena; Attendance: 200; Referee: Antti Munukka

1 March 2017	HJK	4–0	HIFK	Helsinki
17:00 EET (UTC+2)	Mensah 64', 66'; Pelvas 37'; Morelos 90+3'	Report		Stadium: Sonera Stadium; Attendance: 1,752; Referee: Oskari Hämäläinen

4 March 2017	GrIFK	2–0	IF Gnistan	Kauniainen
14:00 EET (UTC+2)	Langhoff 35'; Langhoff 40'	Report		Stadium: Kauniainen Jäähallin TN; Attendance: 48; Referee: Janne Sjögren

4 March 2017	KTP	0–2	FC Honka	Kotka
15:00 EET (UTC+2)		Report	Douglas Silveira 39' (pen.); Korhonen 50'	Stadium: Arto Tolsa Areena; Attendance: 220

==== Group D ====
Team	Pld	W	D	L	GF	GA	GD	Pts
IFK Mariehamn	5	4	1	0	11	1	+10	13
FC Inter Turku	5	3	1	1	13	3	+10	10
Ekenäs IF	5	3	0	2	6	7	−1	9
TPS	5	1	2	2	9	8	+1	5
FC Legirus Inter	5	1	1	3	5	10	−5	4
P-Iirot	5	0	1	4	4	19	−15	1

20 January 2017	TPS	5–0	P-Iirot	Turku
18:00	Hyyrynen 13'; Tapani Virtanen 40', 45+1'; Mettälä 54' (pen.), 68'	Report		Stadium: Veritas Stadion; Attendance: 416; Referee: Pouria Notash

27 January 2017	FC Inter Turku	5–0	Ekenäs IF	Turku
14:00	García 10'; Källman 28'; Furuholm 67'; Ademi 87' (pen.), 90+1'	Report		Stadium: Javenture-Areena; Attendance: 160; Referee: Marko Grönholm

29 January 2017	IFK Mariehamn	4–0	FC Legirus Inter	Eckerö
18:00	Sid 13'; Mkosana 34', 66'; Karlström 77'	Report		Stadium: Eckeröhallen; Attendance: 376; Referee: Joni Hyytiä

3 February 2017	TPS	1–1	IFK Mariehamn	Turku
17:00	Ääritalo 42'	Report	Sellin 53'	Stadium: Kupittaa 5 KHT; Attendance: 549; Referee: Dennis Antamo

4 February 2017	FC Legirus Inter	0–1	FC Inter Turku	Vantaa
12:00		Report	Furuholm 31'	Stadium: Kalmuuri TN; Attendance: 150; Referee: Oliver Reitala

4 February 2017	P-Iirot	1–2	Ekenäs IF	Rauma
17:00	Snicker 84'	Report	Aalto 28'; Kinda 52'	Stadium: Äijänsuon stadion Attendance: 179; Referee: Ifeoma Kulmala

10 February 2017	FC Inter Turku	2–2	TPS	Turku
14:00	Mäkitalo 24'; Källman 60'	Report	Holma 53'; Tenho 90+4'	Stadium: Javenture-Areena; Attendance: 200; Referee: Joni Hyytiä

11 February 2017	IFK Mariehamn	4–0	P-Iirot	Eckerö
19:00	Lyyski 8'; Kangaskolkka 45'; Span 60'; Sellin 84'	Report		Stadium: Eckeröhallen; Attendance: 292; Referee: Jesse Salo

18 February 2017	FC Legirus Inter	2–1	TPS	Vantaa
12:00	Lankinen 27'; Tolppa 87'	Report	Tenho 84'	Stadium: Kalmuuri TN; Attendance: 150; Referee: Joonas Kovapohja

18 February 2017	FC Inter Turku	5–0	P-Iirot	Turku
15:00	Lucas García 31', 67', 87'; Furuholm 75'; Njoku 79'	Report		Stadium: Javenture-Areena; Attendance: 218; Referee: Pouria Notash

18 February 2017	Ekenäs IF	0–1	IFK Mariehamn	Raseborg
16:00		Report	Kangaskolkka 87' (pen.)	Stadium: Keskuskenttä TN; Attendance: 283; Referee: Dennis Antamo

26 February 2017	Ekenäs IF	1–0	FC Legirus Inter	Raseborg
15:00	Estlander 79' (pen.)	Report		Stadium: Keskuskenttä TN; Attendance: 152; Referee: Oskari Hämäläinen

1 March 2017	IFK Mariehamn	1–0	FC Inter Turku	Eckerö
19:00	Kangaskolkka 46'	Report		Stadium: Eckeröhallen; Attendance: 430; Referee: Dennis Antamo

3 March 2017	TPS	0–3	Ekenäs IF	Turku
17:00		Report	Estlander 55'; Tabe 74', 85'	Stadium: Kupittaa 5 KHT; Attendance: 221; Referee: Joni Hyytiä

4 March 2017	P-Iirot	3–3	FC Legirus Inter	Rauma
14:30	Patola 20', 52', 53'	Report	Chidi 26', 27', 55'	Stadium: Äijänsuo stadion Referee: Miikka Lähdesmäki

==== Group E ====
Team	Pld	W	D	L	GF	GA	GD	Pts
FC Ilves	5	5	0	0	12	2	+10	15
KuPS	5	4	0	1	20	5	+15	12
FC Haka	5	2	1	2	11	5	+6	7
FC Lahti	5	1	1	3	8	12	−4	4
MP	5	1	0	4	5	20	−15	3
JJK Jyväskylä	5	1	0	4	8	19	−11	3

20 January 2017	KuPS	9–1	JJK Jyväskylä	Kuopio
18:00	Niskanen 18'; Duah 27', 33'; Rannankari 65'; Salami 68' (pen.), 80' (pen.); Sorsa 71'; Mäkelä 81'; Alaharjula 90+1'	Report	Kohonen 23'	Stadium: Kuopio-halli; Attendance: 1007; Referee: Ville Nevalainen

21 January 2017	FC Lahti	1–1	FC Haka	Lahti
14:00	Tuominen 90'	Report	Järvi 68'	Stadium: Mukkula Halli; Attendance: 123; Referee: Oskari Hämäläinen

28 January 2017	FC Lahti	0–2	FC Ilves	Lahti
14:00		Report	Tanska 23'; Siira 73'	Stadium: Mukkula Halli TN; Attendance: 123; Referee: Mikko Leino

28 January 2017	FC Haka	4–0	JJK Jyväskylä	Valkeakoski
14:30	Multanen 18'; Mäenpää 25', 44'; Lähdesmäki 80'	Report		Stadium: Vkoski Sahara; Attendance: 300; Referee: Dennis Antamo

28 January 2017	MP	0–5	KuPS	Mikkeli
15:00		Report	Purje 23'; Salami 31', 42'; Alaharjula 73', 85'	Stadium: Urpola TN; Attendance: 250

3 February 2017	KuPS	4–2	FC Lahti	Kuopio
18:00	Duah 1'; Hertsi 45+1' (o.g.); Salami 66'; Niskanen 82'	Report	Voutilainen 5'; Osipov 52'	Stadium: Kuopio-halli; Attendance: 1313

4 February 2017	JJK Jyväskylä	4–2	MP	Jyväskylä
13:30	Kari 35'; Petrescu 79'; Tahvanainen 89', 90+1'	Report	Mäenpää 22', 77'	Stadium: Vehkahalli; Attendance: 130; Referee: Lassi Siukkola

10 February 2017	FC Ilves	4–0	MP	Tampere
18:30	Ayarna 18'; Hilska 34'; Ala-Myllymäki 80'; Hynynen 81'	Report		Stadium: Pirkkahalli C Attendance: 550; Referee: Lassi Siukkola

17 February 2017	KuPS	1–0	FC Haka	Kuopio
18:00	Duah 25'	Report		Stadium: Kuopio-halli; Attendance: 550; Referee: Teemu Soini

18 February 2017	JJK Jyväskylä	0–1	FC Ilves	Jyväskylä
13:30		Report	Tanska 20'	Stadium: Vehkahalli; Attendance: 215; Referee: Ville Nevalainen

21 February 2017	MP	3–2	FC Lahti	Mikkeli
18:30	Kimari 19', 52'; Liukkonen 51'	Report	Hostikka 59'; Tanskanen 71'	Stadium: Urpola TN; Attendance: 113

6 March 2017	FC Lahti	3–2	JJK Jyväskylä	Lahti
18:00	Nazimov 20'; Sadat 30'; Helmke 38'	Report	Tahvanainen 44'; Lähitie 80'	Stadium: Mukkula Halli TN; Attendance: 148; Referee: Atte Jussila

7 March 2017	FC Ilves	2–1	KuPS	Tampere
15:00	Ayarna 33'; Ngueukam 60'	Report	Purje 39'	Stadium: Pirkkahalli C Attendance: 750; Referee: Ville Nevalainen

7 March 2017	FC Haka	5–0	MP	Valkeakoski
18:30	Multanen 12', 58'; Mäenpää 29', 71'; Lähdesmäki 88'	Report		Stadium: Vkoski Sahara TN; Attendance: 200; Referee: Lassi Siukkola

== Play-offs for Quarterfinals ==
11 March 2017	FC Inter Turku	2–0	VPS	Turku
12:00	Källman 52'; Furuholm 75'	Report		Stadium: Kupittaa 5 KHT; Attendance: 350; Referee: Mikko Leino

12 March 2017	KuPS	2–4	FC Honka	Kuopio
16:00	Egwuekwe 66'; Boxall 83'	Report	Ömer 23'; Laevuo 38'; Saarinen 42'; Ivanov 76'	Stadium: Kuopio Football Stadium; Attendance: 752; Referee: Tommi Grönman

13 March 2017	RoPS	0–2	SJK	Kemi
18:00		Report	Klinga 6'; Guichón 57'	Stadium: Junkohalli TN; Attendance: 174; Referee: Toni Pohjoismäki

== Quarter-finals ==
18 March 2017	FC Ilves	4–2	KPV	Tampere
14:30	Rahimi 52', 58' (pen.); Matrone 72'; Ngueukam 90+4'	Report	Hasanzada 35'; Sirbiladze 43'	Stadium: Pirkkahalli C Attendance: 800; Referee: Jari Järvinen

18 March 2017	FF Jaro	0–1	FC Honka	Jakobstad
15:15		Report	Tolonen 90'	Stadium: Tellushallen; Attendance: 861; Referee: Petri Viljanen

18 March 2017	SJK	3–2	FC Inter Turku	Seinäjoki
16:00	Ions 37'; M'Boma 70'; Guichón 81'	Report	Alan Henrique 51'; Furuholm 66'	Stadium: OmaSp Stadion; Attendance: 1,569; Referee: Ville Nevalainen

19 March 2017	IFK Mariehamn	0–3	HJK Helsinki	Eckerö
17:00		Report	Yaghoubi 17'; Vaikla 28' (o.g.); Pelvas 42' (pen.)	Stadium: Eckeröhallen; Attendance: 580; Referee: Marko Grönholm

== Semi-finals ==
1 April 2017	FC Honka	1–1 (a.e.t.) (4–5 p)	SJK	Espoo
12:30	Liikonen 39'	Report	Hetemaj 29' (pen.)	Stadium: Tapiola 1 TN; Attendance: 687; Referee: Mikko Mörö
	Penalties
	Tammilehto (penalty missed); Rasimus (penalty scored); Perovuo (penalty scored); Puuskari (penalty scored); Äijälä (penalty scored)		Guichón (penalty scored); Laaksonen (penalty scored); Ions (penalty scored); Klinga (penalty scored); Hetemaj (penalty scored)

1 April 2017	FC Ilves	0–1	HJK Helsinki	Tampere
14:30		Report	Morelos 75'	Stadium: Pirkkahalli C Attendance: 800; Referee: Kalle Mäkinen

== Final ==
23 September 2017	SJK	0–1	HJK Helsinki	Seinäjoki
14:00		Report	Akseli Pelvas 77'	Stadium: OmaSP Stadion; Attendance: 3,617; Referee: Marko Grönholm
