= Pyry Hannola =

Finnish footballer (born 2001)

Personal information
- Full name: Pyry Petteri Hannola
- Date of birth: 21 October 2001 (age 25)
- Place of birth: Rovaniemi, Finland
- Height: 1.85 m (6 ft 1 in)
- Position: Midfielder

Team information
- Current team: Haugesund
- Number: 8

Youth career
- Santa Claus
- –2017: RoPS
- 2017–2020: Midtjylland

Senior career*
Years	Team	Apps	(Gls)
2017	RoPS	2	(0)
2017–2020	Midtjylland	0	(0)
2020–2022	HJK	6	(0)
2020	→ Klubi 04	5	(0)
2021	→ SJK (loan)	22	(0)
2022–2025	SJK	80	(4)
2025	→ Stal Mielec (loan)	11	(0)
2025–	Haugesund	42	(1)

International career
2016–2017	Finland U16	13	(0)
2017–2018	Finland U17	5	(0)
2019	Finland U19	6	(0)
2021–2022	Finland U21	8	(0)
- * Club domestic league appearances and goals as of 14 November 2026

Pyry Petteri Hannola (born 21 October 2001) is a Finnish professional footballer who plays as a midfielder for Norwegian First Division club Haugesund.

== Club career ==
=== RoPS ===
Hannola signed his first contract with RoPS in October 2016, 13 days before his 15th birthday. He made his debut in the 2017 Finnish Cup in January 2017. He scored his first senior goal in the same competition, the second of a 9–0 victory over Oulun Palloseura. He made his league debut in April 2017, coming on as a 90th-minute substitute for Saku Ylätupa in a 3–1 victory over PS Kemi.

=== Midtjylland ===
In early 2017, it was announced that Hannola would be joining Danish Superliga side FC Midtjylland in the summer. He signed a new three-year deal with FC Midtjylland in June 2018, and was assigned to the club's academy squad.

=== HJK and SJK ===
After playing the 2021 season for SJK Seinäjoki on loan from HJK Helsinki, on 5 April 2022 Hannola returned to the club on a permanent basis with a long-term contract, for an undisclosed fee, reported to be €80,000. On 3 August 2024, his deal with SJK was extended until the end of 2026.

==== Stal Mielec (loan) ====
On 5 January 2025, Hannola joined Ekstraklasa club Stal Mielec on loan for the remainder of the season with an option to buy. The option was not exercised when Stal Mielec was relegated and he returned to SJK at the turn of July.

== International career ==
Hannola has represented Finland at the under-16 and under-17 level. He made his debut for the under-21 squad in June 2021.

== Career statistics ==
As of match played 14 November 2026

Appearances and goals by club, season and competition
Club	Season	League			National cup (Note: Includes Suomen Cup)		League cup (Note: Includes Finnish League Cup)		Continental		Total	
Club	Season	Division	Apps	Goals	Apps	Goals	Apps	Goals	Apps	Goals	Apps	Goals
RoPS	2017	Veikkausliiga	2	0	5	1	—		–		7	1
Klubi 04	2020	Kakkonen	5	0	—		—		—		5	0
HJK Helsinki	2020	Veikkausliiga	6	0	0	0	—		—		6	0
HJK Helsinki	2021	Veikkausliiga	0	0	1	0	0	0	0	0	1	0
HJK Helsinki	2022	Veikkausliiga	0	0	0	0	3	0	0	0	3	0
HJK Helsinki	Total		6	0	1	0	3	0	0	0	10	0
SJK Seinäjoki (loan)	2021	Veikkausliiga	22	0	—		—		—		22	0
SJK Seinäjoki	2022	Veikkausliiga	23	0	1	1	0	0	4 (Note: Appearances in UEFA Europa Conference League)	0	28	1
SJK Seinäjoki	2023	Veikkausliiga	25	0	2	0	5	0	—		32	0
SJK Seinäjoki	2024	Veikkausliiga	29	4	5	2	5	1	—		39	7
SJK Seinäjoki	2025	Veikkausliiga	3	0	0	0	0	0	2	0	5	0
SJK Seinäjoki	Total		102	4	8	3	10	1	6	0	126	8
Stal Mielec (loan)	2024–25	Ekstraklasa	11	0	—		—		—		11	0
Haugesund	2025	Eliteserien	13	0	1	0	—		—		14	0
Haugesund	2026	Norwegian First Division	29	1	3	0	—		—		57	1
Haugesund	Total		53	1	1	0	0	0	0	0	82	1
Career total			168	5	14	3	13	1	6	0	230	10

== Honours ==
HJK

- Veikkausliiga: 2020

Individual

- Veikkausliiga Breakthrough of the Year: 2021
