= Glenn Gabriel =

Ghanaian footballer

Personal information
- Full name: Tone Glenn Küsel-Gabriel
- Date of birth: 29 April 1996 (age 30)
- Place of birth: Hamburg, Germany
- Height: 1.84 m (6 ft 0 in)
- Position: Forward

Youth career
- Brentford
- Stoke City
- 2012–2013: FC St. Pauli
- 2013–2014: Astoria Walldorf

Senior career*
Years	Team	Apps	(Gls)
2014–2015	Ermis Aradippou		
2016	Basingstoke Town	0	(0)
2017	RoPS	4	(0)
2018–2021	Lorca	22	(18)
2023	Peterhead	8	(0)
2024	Weymouth	1	(0)
2024–2025	Binfield	18	(12)
2025–2026	Havant & Waterlooville	1	(0)
2026	Farnborough	0	(0)
2026	→ Sholing (dual-registration)	2	(0)
- * Club domestic league appearances and goals as of 21:08, 11 May 2026 (UTC)

Tone Glenn Küsel-Gabriel (born 29 April 1996) is a German professional footballer who last played as a forward for Farnborough.

== Club career ==
Born in Hamburg, Gabriel represented Brentford, Stoke City and FC St. Pauli as a youth.

On 11 July 2014, he signed a three-year deal with Cypriot First Division side Ermis Aradippou FC, but mutually terminated his contract 6 months due to personally reasons

On 13 August 2017, Gabriel signed a six-month contract with Rovaniemen Palloseura. He made his debut the following day, coming on as a late substitute for Timo Stavitski in a 1–0 Veikkausliiga away win against HJK On 24 August, he signed for Lorca fc after their relegation from the Segunda Liga.

Gabriel joined Scottish League One side Peterhead in January 2023.

After spells with Binfield, Weymouth, and Havant & Waterlooville, Gabriel joined National League South side, Farnborough in February 2026. On 29 March 2026, Gabriel dual-registered with Southern League Premier Division South side, Sholing.

== Career statistics ==
As of match played 25 April 2026

Appearances and goals by club, season and competition
Club	Season	League			National Cup		League Cup		Other		Total	
Club	Season	Division	Apps	Goals	Apps	Goals	Apps	Goals	Apps	Goals	Apps	Goals
Ermis Aradippou	2014–15	Cypriot First Division	Season statistics not known									
Basingstoke Town	2016–17	Southern League Premier Division	0	0	0	0	—		0	0	0	0
RoPS	2017	Veikkausliiga	4	0	0	0	0	0	—		4	0
Preston Lions	2018	Victorian State League Division 1 North-West	4	1	0	0	0	0	—		4	1
Lorca	2018–19	Tercera Federación – Group 13	22	4	1	0	—		—		23	4
Mousehole	2019–20	South West Peninsula League Premier Division West	Season statistics not known									
Hendon	2019–20	Southern League Premier Division South	0	0	—		—		—		0	0
ENAD Polis Chrysochous	2020–21	Cypriot Third Division	Season statistics not known									
Thatcham Town	2021–22	Isthmian League South Central Division	16	3	—		—		2 (Note: One appearance in the FA Trophy, one in the Alan Turvey Trophy)	0	18	3
Peterhead	2022–23	Scottish League One	8	0	0	0	0	0	0	0	8	0
Hanwell Town	2023–24	Southern League Premier Division South	1	0	—		—		—		1	0
Cray Wanderers	2023–24	Isthmian League Premier Division	1	0	—		—		—		1	0
Binfield	2023–24	Isthmian League South Central Division	8	2	—		—		—		8	2
Weymouth	2024–25	National League South	1	0	0	0	—		0	0	1	0
Binfield	2024–25	Isthmian League South Central Division	18	0	—		—		1 (Note: Appearance in the Alan Turvey Trophy)	0	19	0
Guildford City	2025–26	Combined Counties League Premier Division South	4	0	—		—		—		4	0
Havant & Waterlooville	2025–26	Southern League Premier Division South	1	0	—		—		—		1	0
Farnborough	2025–26	National League South	0	0	—		—		—		0	0
Sholing (dual-registration)	2025–26	Southern League Premier Division South	2	0	—		—		—		2	0
Career total			90	10	1	0	0	0	3	0	94	10
