= Kasperi Liikonen =

Finnish footballer (born 1994)

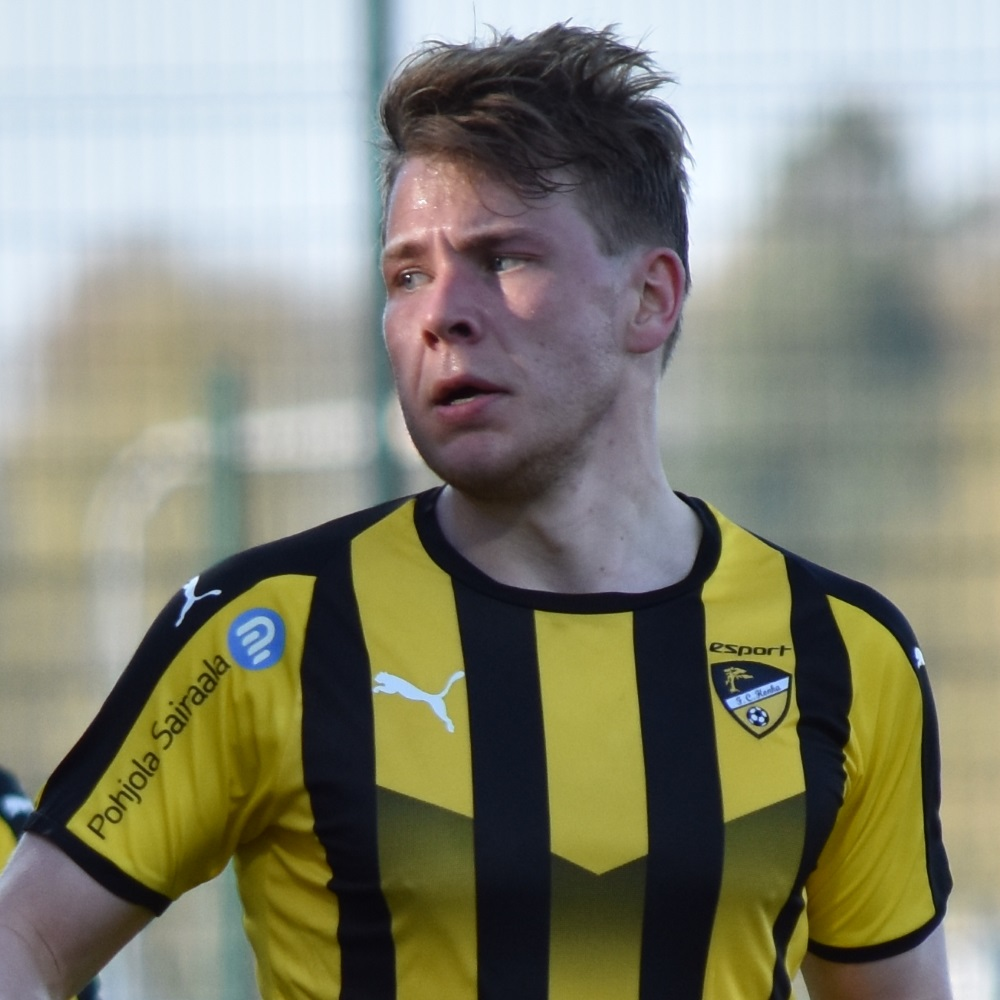
- Liikonen with Honka in 2018

Personal information
- Date of birth: 9 September 1994 (age 32)
- Height: 1.75 m (5 ft 9 in)
- Position: Winger

Team information
- Current team: Honka
- Number: 23

Youth career
- Espoo

Senior career*
Years	Team	Apps	(Gls)
2011–2012	Espoo	31	(13)
2013–2014	Viikingit	35	(10)
2014	Viikkarit	1	(0)
2014	KTP	5	(1)
2015	Haka	23	(3)
2016–2018	Honka	61	(15)
2019	KTP	25	(1)
2020–2024	Gnistan	56	(6)
2023	→ NJS (loan)	4	(2)
2024	→ PKKU (loan)	5	(2)
2025–	Honka	43	(11)

International career
- Finland U19
- * Club domestic league appearances and goals as of 8 November 2026

Kasperi Liikonen (born 9 September 1994) is a Finnish footballer who plays for Kakkonen club Honka, as a winger.

== Career ==
On 11 January 2024, Liikonen extended his contract with Gnistan for the 2024 season.
