= Emeka Friday Eze =

Nigerian footballer

Personal information
- Date of birth: 26 September 1996 (age 30)
- Place of birth: Lagos, Nigeria
- Height: 1.87 m (6 ft 2 in)
- Position: Forward

Team information
- Current team: Sarıyer
- Number: 90

Senior career*
Years	Team	Apps	(Gls)
2014–2015	Oxygène de Mfou	47	(31)
2016	Aigle Royal Menoua	29	(9)
2017	RoPS	21	(7)
2017–2021	Sturm Graz	43	(6)
2019–2020	→ Adanaspor (loan)	17	(5)
2021–2022	Ankara Keçiörengücü	45	(22)
2022–2023	Eyüpspor	18	(6)
2023	→ İstanbulspor (loan)	15	(4)
2023–2025	Pendikspor	41	(13)
2025–2026	Çorum	19	(5)
2026	→ Sarıyer (loan)	16	(5)
2026–	Sarıyer	5	(2)
- * Club domestic league appearances and goals as of 13 October 2026

Emeka Friday Eze (born 26 September 1996) is a Nigerian footballer who plays as a striker for Turkish TFF 1. Lig club Sarıyer.

== Playing career ==
=== Early career ===
After playing for a minor club in Nigeria, Eze arrived in Cameroon in 2013, where he started off playing for a local football academy in Mbanga. He then joined Oxygène de Mfou, a second division regional club in the Centre region, in 2014. Despite not playing the whole of first season he managed eleven goals and close to thirty the next season, earning him titles for the best player and top scorer in the league respectively.

Following the two successful seasons with Oxygène, Eze was offered a contract by MTN Elite One (Ligue 1) club Aigle Royal Menoua. He ended the 2016 season with nine goals and was among the 25 nominees for the league's best player award.

In 2017, Eze was headed to Cameroonian champion UMS de Loum, but set his sights to Europe instead. After trying out for Estonian Paide Linnameeskond, he ended up playing for RoPS in Rovaniemi, Finland. He scored a goal in his first appearance with RoPS in a friendly match against IFK Luleå.

Having made his Veikkausliiga debut on 22 April 2017, Eze's first goal came a week later in his second game, against PS Kemi.

On 11 January 2023, Eze was loaned by İstanbulspor.

Eze joined Pendikspor on 3 August 2023.
