= Paavo Voutilainen =

Finnish footballer (born 1999)

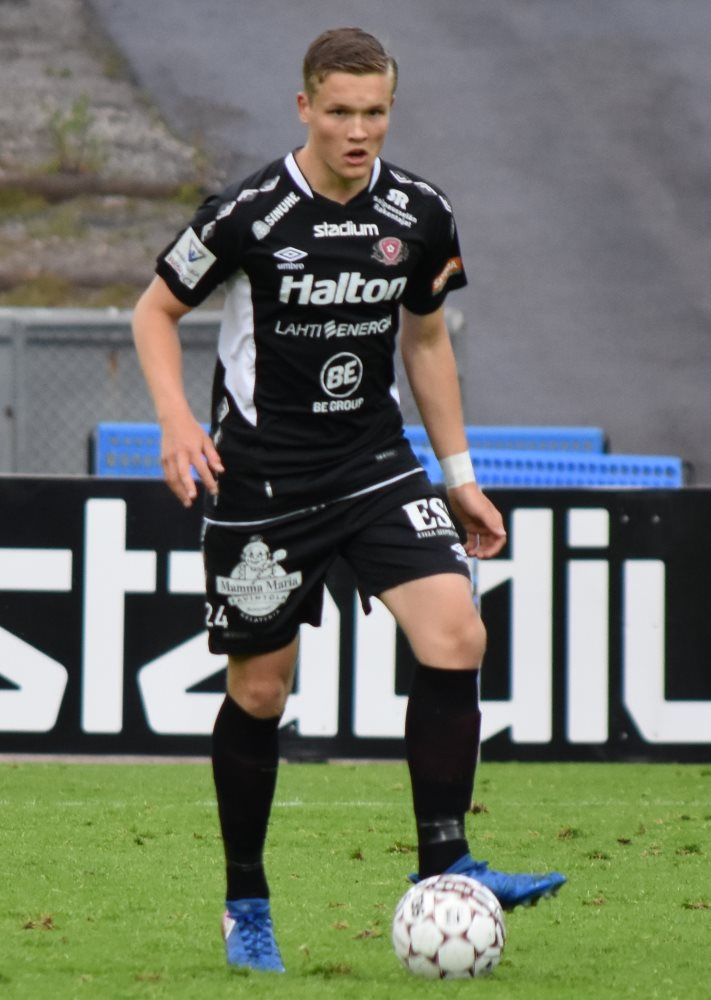

Personal information
- Date of birth: 25 February 1999 (age 27)
- Place of birth: Imatra, Finland
- Height: 1.90 m (6 ft 3 in)
- Position: Centre back

Youth career
- Imatran PS
- 2015: MyPa

Senior career*
| Years | Team | Apps | (Gls) |
| 2015–2018 | Lahti | 3 | (0) |
| 2015 | → Lahti Akatemia (loan) | 16 | (2) |
| 2016 | → Lahti Akatemia (loan) | 20 | (0) |
| 2017 | → Lahti Akatemia (loan) | 11 | (1) |
| 2018 | → PKKU (loan) | 3 | (0) |
| 2019–2021 | KTP | 64 | (2) |
- * Club domestic league appearances and goals as of 31 October 2021

Paavo Voutilainen (born 25 February 1999) is a Finnish professional footballer who plays as a centre back.

== Career ==
Voutilainen has played for Lahti and Lahti Akatemia. On 25 January 2019, Voutilainen signed a two-year contract with FC KTP.
