= Timo Stavitski =

Finnish footballer (born 1999)

Personal information
- Date of birth: 17 July 1999 (age 27)
- Place of birth: Lahti, Finland
- Height: 1.80 m (5 ft 11 in)
- Position: Winger

Team information
- Current team: Mjällby
- Number: 11

Youth career
- KyIF
- –2015: HJK

Senior career*
Years	Team	Apps	(Gls)
2016	Klubi 04	14	(2)
2017	RoPS	29	(3)
2018–2022	Caen	10	(0)
2018	→ Caen B	2	(0)
2018	→ Osijek (loan)	0	(0)
2019	→ RoPS (loan)	0	(0)
2020–2021	→ MVV (loan)	13	(0)
2023–2024	Inter Turku	43	(8)
2024–	Mjällby	39	(2)

International career^{‡}
2015–2016	Finland U17	10	(1)
2016–2017	Finland U18	6	(2)
2017–2018	Finland U19	11	(0)
2020	Finland U21	5	(1)
- * Club domestic league appearances and goals as of 8 July 2026 ‡ National team caps and goals as of 17 November 2020

Timo Stavitski (Russian: Тимо Ставицкий, born 17 July 1999) is a Finnish professional footballer who plays as a winger for Allsvenskan club Mjällby.

== Club career ==
=== Early career ===
Born in Lahti and raised in Kirkkonummi, Stavitski played in the youth sectors of his hometown club Kyrkslätt Idrottsförening (KyIF) and HJK Helsinki, and made his senior debut with HJK's reserve team Klubi 04 in 2016. He joined Veikkausliiga side Rovaniemen Palloseura (RoPS) in early 2017. He scored his first professional goal in a 6–2 defeat by Inter Turku.

=== Caen and loans ===
In December 2017, after trialling with La Liga club Barcelona, Stavitski joined Ligue 1 side Caen, for a €600,000 transfer fee.

After spending a chaotic six months on loan with NK Osijek, in January 2019, he joined RoPS on loan.

On 4 February 2019, Stavitski was loaned out to RoPS, where he played before in 2017, until mid July. Stavitski had had a long-lasting pain in his groin for about six to seven months. It resulted in a surgery in April 2019 and he would be out for the rest of the season. Stavitski returned to France to get treatment in Caen.

In July 2020, Stavitski joined Eerste Divisie club MVV Maastricht on a one-season loan deal, but suffered from a knee injury during his loan.

On 7 January 2022, his contract with Caen was terminated by mutual consent.

Later in 2022, Stavitski spent time with Eliteserien club Sarpsborg on trial, but the deal was collapsed due to injury.

=== Inter Turku ===
Due to consecutive injuries, Stavitski had already ended his career. However, he returned to Finland for the 2023 Veikkausliiga season and signed with Inter Turku on a one-year deal with an option to extend. On 4 February 2023, Stavitski made his first competitive appearance in over two years, helping Inter to take a 1–0 win in a Finnish League Cup match against IFK Mariehamn.

On 17 August 2023, his contract with Inter was extended for the 2024 season, with an option for 2025. The option was exercised in August 2024.

During his one-and-a-half seasons with Inter, Stavitski made a total of 62 official appearances, scoring 12 goals and providing 11 assists.

=== Mjällby ===
On 22 August 2024, Stavitski signed with Allsvenskan club Mjällby AIF on a four-and-a-half-year deal for an undisclosed fee. Four days later, he debuted in Allsvenskan for his new club, scoring a winning goal and providing an assist in a 2–1 away win against IFK Norrköping. He went on to provide two more assists during the remainder of the 2024 season, totalling 11 appearances for Mjällby as the club finished 5th in the league.

== International career ==
Stavitski has represented Finland at under-17, under-18, under-19 and under-21 youth national team levels.

== Personal life ==
Stavitski is of Russian and Ingrian Finnish descent, and he is bilingual, speaking both Finnish and Russian.

== Career statistics ==
As of 27 July 2025

Club	Season	Division	League		Cup^{1}		League cup^{2}		Europe		Total	
Club	Season	Division	Apps	Goals	Apps	Goals	Apps	Goals	Apps	Goals	Apps	Goals
Klubi 04	2016	Kakkonen	14	2	1	0	—		—		15	2
RoPS	2017	Veikkausliiga	29	3	3	0	—		—		32	3
Caen	2017–18	Ligue 1	9	0	2	1	—		—		11	1
Caen	2018–19	Ligue 1	1	0	0	0	—		—		1	0
Caen	Total		10	0	2	1	0	0	0	0	12	1
Caen B	2017–18	National 3	1	0	0	0	—		—		1	0
Caen B	2018–19	National 3	1	0	0	0	—		—		1	0
Caen B	Total		2	0	0	0	0	0	0	0	2	0
Osijek (loan)	2018–19	1. HNL	0	0	1	0	—		—		1	0
RoPS (loan)	2019	Veikkausliiga	0	0	0	0	—		0	0	0	0
MVV Maastricht (loan)	2020–21	Eerste Divisie	13	0	0	0	—		—		13	0
Inter Turku	2023	Veikkausliiga	24	3	2	1	6	1	—		32	5
Inter Turku	2024	Veikkausliiga	19	5	4	2	7	0	—		30	7
Inter Turku	Total		43	8	6	3	13	1	0	0	62	12
Mjällby	2024	Allsvenskan	11	1	0	0	—		—		11	1
Mjällby	2025	Allsvenskan	12	1	3	1	–		–		15	2
Mjällby	Total		23	2	3	1	0	0	0	0	26	3
Career total			134	15	16	5	13	1	0	0	163	21

^{1}Includes Finnish Cup, Coupe de France, Croatian Football Cup and Svenska Cupen appearances.

^{2}Includes Finnish League Cup and Coupe de la Ligue appearances.

== Honours ==
Mjällby

- Allsvenskan: 2025
- Svenska Cupen: 2025–26

Inter Turku

- Finnish League Cup: 2024
