= Jani Tanska =

Finnish footballer (born 1988)

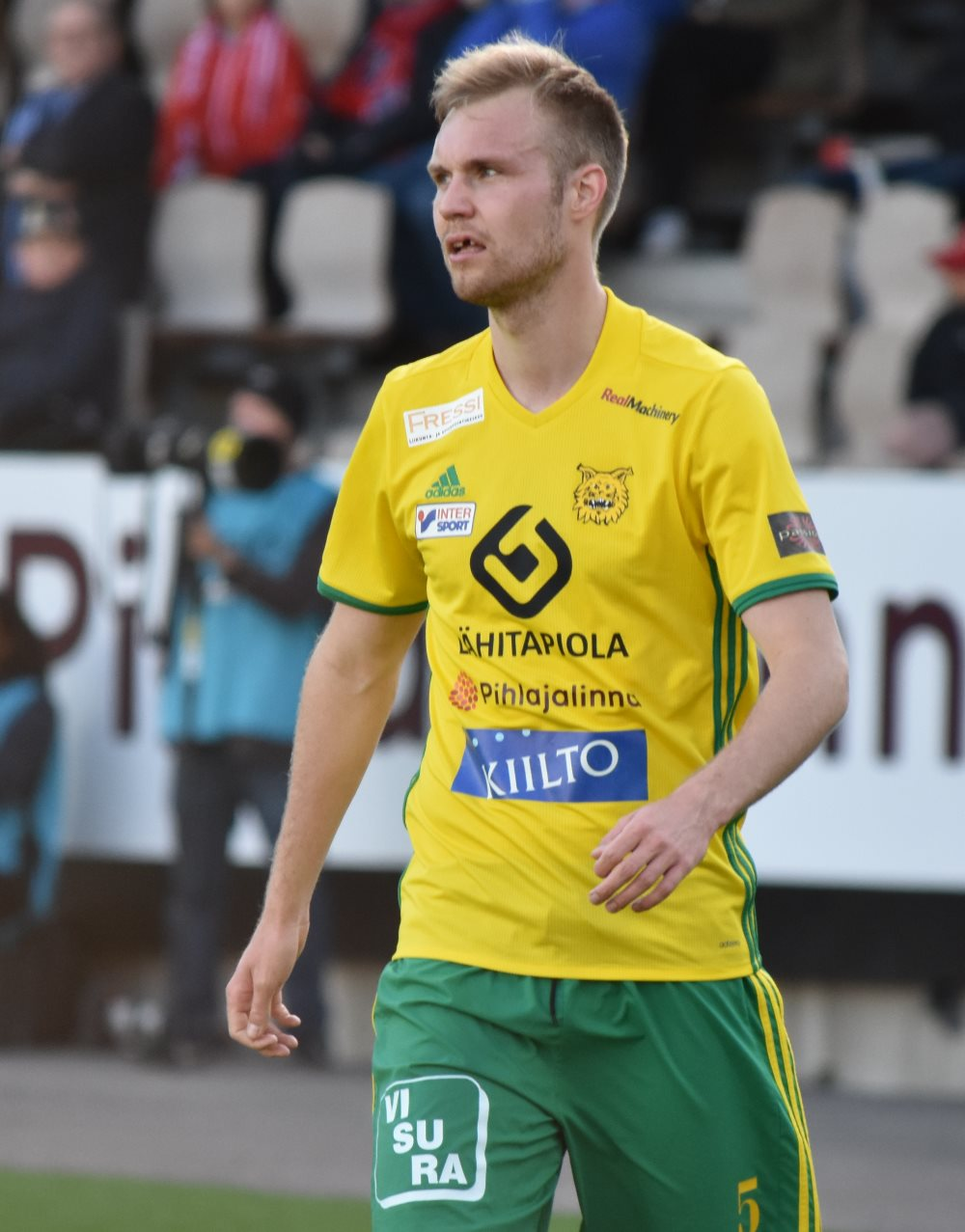
- Tanska with Ilves in 2017

Personal information
- Full name: Jani Oskari Tanska
- Date of birth: 29 July 1988 (age 38)
- Place of birth: Anjalankoski, Finland
- Height: 1.94 m (6 ft 4 in)
- Position: Centre-back

Youth career
- –2004: MyPa
- 2004–2007: Charlton Athletic

Senior career*
Years	Team	Apps	(Gls)
2004–2007	MyPa	3	(0)
2006	→ FK Lyn (loan)		
2007	→ PP-70 (loan)	11	(0)
2008	KTP	23	(1)
2009	FF Jaro	20	(1)
2010–2011	VPS	37	(0)
2012–2013	TPS	64	(4)
2014–2015	FC Lahti	31	(3)
2015	Assyriska FF	6	(0)
2015–2016	FC Lahti	36	(3)
2017–2018	FC Ilves	48	(2)
2019	FC Lahti	22	(1)

International career
–2010	Finland U21	9	(0)
2013	Finland B	1	(0)
- * Club domestic league appearances and goals

Jani Oskari Tanska (born 29 July 1988) is a Finnish former professional footballer who played as a central defender. He was a product of MyPa youth academy and later spent three years with Charlton Athletic in 2004–2007.

== Career ==
Tanska made his Veikkausliiga debut with MyPa in 2004. He joined the Norwegian club FC Lyn Oslo on loan for the 2006 season. Between 2008 and 2013, he played in Finland for KooTeePee, Jaro, VPS and TPS.

After a year with FC Lahti, Tanska was transferred to Swedish club Assyriska FF in 2015, but played only six matches before his contract was terminated for financial reasons.

He then returned to Lahti and remained with the club until the end of the 2016 Veikkausliiga season, after which he moved to Ilves.

Tanska rejoined FC Lahti for the 2019 season. The deal was announced on 30 October 2018.

Due to health problems that had affected him during the previous two seasons, Tanska announced his retirement in November 2019, despite having one year remaining on his contract.
