= Rasmus Holma =

Finnish footballer (born 1992)

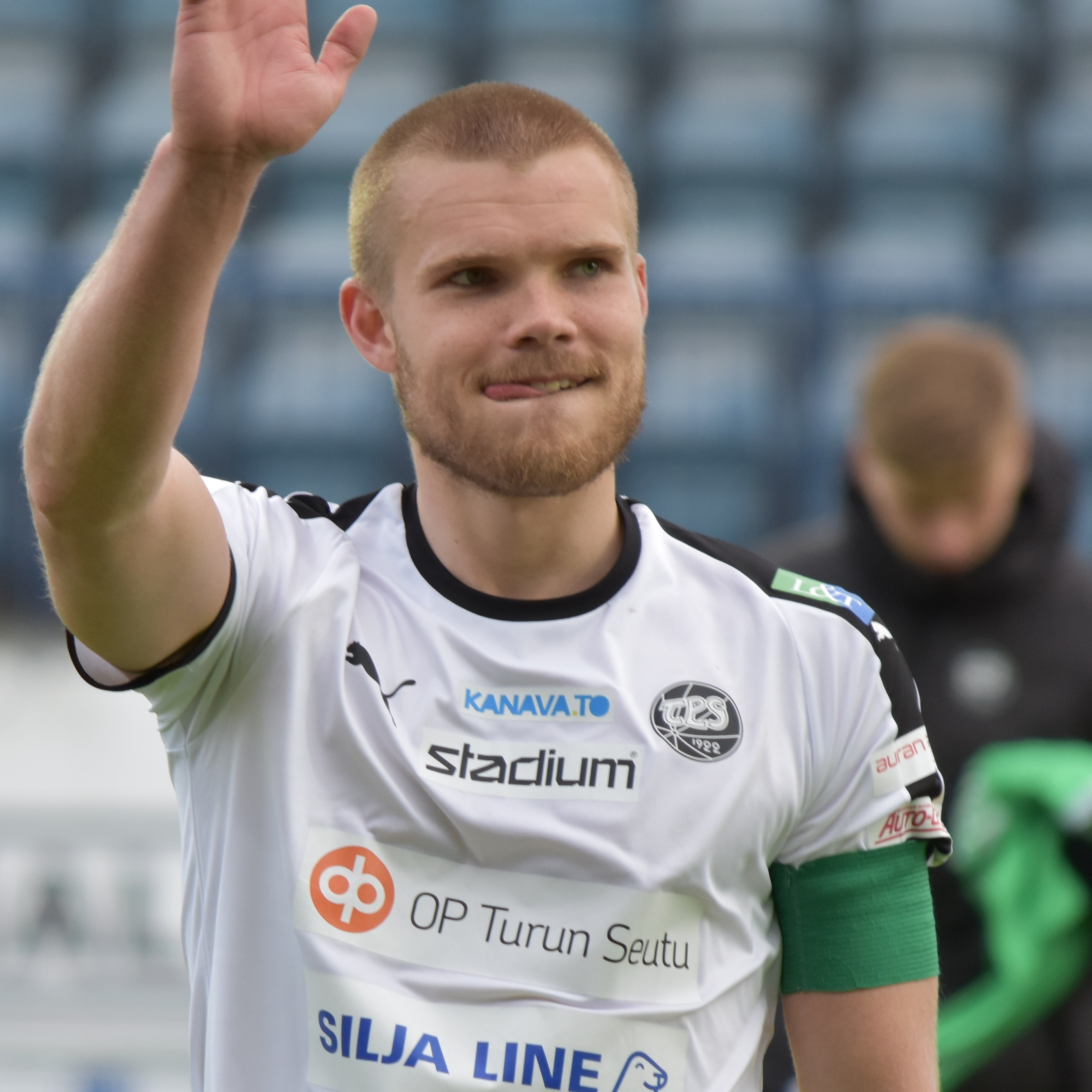
- Holma with TPS in 2018

Personal information
- Date of birth: 13 September 1992 (age 34)
- Place of birth: Kaarina, Finland
- Height: 1.86 m (6 ft 1 in)
- Position: Midfielder

Team information
- Current team: TPS (chief executive officer)

Youth career
- Inter Turku

Senior career*
Years	Team	Apps	(Gls)
2011	TuTo	6	(0)
2012	Åbo IFK	21	(1)
2013–2014	MaPS	50	(8)
2015–2022	TPS	153	(9)

Managerial career
- 2025–: TPS (chief executive officer)
- * Club domestic league appearances and goals

Rasmus Holma (born 13 September 1992) is a Finnish former professional footballer who played as a midfielder. Since October 2025, he is the CEO of Turun Palloseura.

Following his playing career, Holma studied at the University of Turku and graduated as MBA.
