= Pablo González (Chilean footballer) =

Chilean footballer (born 1986)

Personal information
- Full name: Pablo Ignacio González Reyes
- Date of birth: 19 November 1986 (age 39)
- Place of birth: Santiago, Chile
- Height: 1.77 m (5 ft 10 in)
- Position: Right midfielder

Youth career
- 1999–2006: Universidad Católica

Senior career*
Years	Team	Apps	(Gls)
2007–2015	Universidad Católica	22	(0)
2007	→ Universidad de Concepción (loan)	16	(1)
2010	→ Ñublense (loan)	27	(6)
2011	→ O'Higgins (loan)	2	(1)
2011	→ Ñublense (loan)	12	(2)
2013	→ Cobreloa (loan)	26	(4)
2014	→ Deportes Iquique (loan)	14	(2)
2014–2015	→ San Marcos (loan)	36	(4)
2015–2016	Cobresal	16	(1)
2016–2017	Cafetaleros	5	(0)
2017	Clan Juvenil	2	(0)
2017	RoPS	12	(0)
2018	Deportes Melipilla	1	(0)
2018	Lusitanos		
2019	San Antonio Unido	4	(1)

International career
2008	Chile U23	4	(2)
- * Club domestic league appearances and goals as of 13 October 2021

Pablo Ignacio González Reyes (Spanish pronunciation: [ˈpaβlo ɣonˈsales ˈreʝes], born 19 November 1986), also known as Mota, is a Chilean former footballer. He could play as a right midfielder or winger on the same side.

== Club career ==
He has played for clubs in Mexico, Ecuador, Finland and Andorra. On 17 August 2018, González joined FC Lusitanos in Andorra.

== International career ==
He represented Chile U23 at the 2008 Inter Continental Cup in Malaysia, scoring two goals.

== Coaching career ==
González graduated as a football manager in Barcelona, Spain, and then he moved to the United States looking for a chance. He was invited by a Chilean coach, Juan Jara, to Canada and joined an academy as both coach and assistant at different youth levels.

== Honours ==
=== Club ===
Universidad de Concepción

- Torneo Clausura (1): Runner-up 2007
