= Cem Felek =

Azerbaijani footballer (born 1996)

Personal information
- Full name: Cem Felek
- Date of birth: 12 May 1996 (age 30)
- Place of birth: Buchen, Germany
- Height: 1.80 m (5 ft 11 in)
- Position: Attacking midfielder

Youth career
- 2001–2008: SC Viktoria 06 Griesheim
- 2008–2013: Eintracht Frankfurt
- 2013–2014: VfL Bochum
- 2014–2015: Aberdeen

Senior career*
Years	Team	Apps	(Gls)
2015–2017	Fatih Karagümrük	0	(0)
2015–2016	→ Antalyaspor (loan)	0	(0)
2017–2018	RoPS	11	(0)
2018	TSV Steinbach	9	(0)
2018	Levadia	14	(4)
2019–2020	KuPS	0	(0)
2019	→ KuFu-98 (loan)	6	(2)
2019–2020	→ Aris Limassol (loan)	8	(0)
2020–2021	VfB Ginsheim	13	(1)
2022	JK Narva Trans	6	(0)

International career
2010	Turkey U15	1	(0)
2012	Azerbaijan U17	11	(5)
2014	Azerbaijan U19	3	(0)
- * Club domestic league appearances and goals as of 1 November 2022

Cem Felek (born 12 May 1996) is a professional footballer who plays as an attacking midfielder. Born in Germany, he has represented both Turkey and Azerbaijan at youth level.

== Club career ==
=== Youth career ===
Born in Buchen, Germany, Felek spent much of his youth career with German sides, most notably a 5-year spell with Eintracht Frankfurt. He was linked with a move to Spanish giants Barcelona in 2010, having scored over 1000 goals at youth level. In 2014, he transferred from Bochum to Scottish Premiership side Aberdeen, where he stayed for a year, making the first-team bench once in 2014 before being released in May 2015.

=== Fatih Karagümrük ===
In 2015, he was linked with a move to Turkish giants Galatasaray, but the move never materialised and Felek instead joined TFF Second League side Fatih Karagümrük in July.

=== Antalyaspor ===
In August 2015, Felek was loaned to Antalyaspor, where he featured for the Antalya-based club's 'B' team. He made his debut for Antalyaspor senior team in the Turkish Cup 1–0 away victory against Giresunspor on 21 January 2016. Felek also played in the Turkish Cup group stage match, coming on as a 74th-minute substitute for Lionel Enguene in a 0–0 home draw against Fenerbahçe on 27 January 2016.

=== RoPS ===
In January 2017, Cem Felek joined Finnish side RoPS. Felek made his Veikkausliiga debut for RoPS against VPS on 17 April 2017. He scored his first goal for RoPS in the Finnish Cup match against OPS in a 9–0 home victory on 11 February 2017.

=== KuPS ===
Felek went back to Finland for the 2019 season. The deal with KuPS was announced on 3 December 2018.

== International career ==
Felek is eligible for Germany through his place of birth, Turkey through his parents, and Azerbaijan through his extended family. He played a single game for the Turkish under-15 side in 2010, a 3–0 victory over The Netherlands. He has represented Azerbaijan at under-17 and under-19 level. In June 2012, he helped the under-17 side win silver medals at the Caspian Cup.

== Career statistics ==
=== Club ===
As of 03 December 2018.

Club	Season	League			Cup		Continental		Other		Total	
Club	Season	Division	Apps	Goals	Apps	Goals	Apps	Goals	Apps	Goals	Apps	Goals
Fatih Karagümrük	2015–16	TFF Second League	0	0	0	0	–		0	0	0	0
Fatih Karagümrük	2016–17	TFF Second League	0	0	0	0	–		0	0	0	0
Fatih Karagümrük	Total		0	0	0	0	0	0	0	0	0	0
Antalyaspor (loan)	2015–16	Süper Lig	0	0	2 (Note: Appearances in the Turkish Cup)	0	–		0	0	2	0
RoPS	2017	Veikkausliiga	11	0	4 (Note: Appearances in the Finnish Cup)	1	–		0	0	15	1
TSV Steinbach	2017–18	Regionalliga Südwest	9	0	0	0	–		0	0	9	0
Levadia	2018	Meistriliiga	3	1	0	1	–		0	0	3	0
Levadia U21	2018	Esiliiga	1	0	0	0	–		0	0	1	0
Kuopion Palloseura	2019	Veikkausliiga	0	0	0	0	–		0	0	0	0
Career total			24	1	6	2	0	0	0	0	30	1
