= Masar Ömer =

Finnish footballer (born 1993)

Personal information
- Date of birth: 12 June 1993 (age 33)
- Position: Striker

Team information
- Current team: FC Honka

Senior career*
Years	Team	Apps	(Gls)
2012–2013	EsPa	25	(16)
2014–2016	PK-35 Vantaa	49	(15)
2017–	FC Honka	17	(9)
- * Club domestic league appearances and goals as of 16:11, 24 May 2018 (UTC)

Masar Ömer (born 12 June 1993) is a Finnish professional footballer who plays for FC Honka, as a striker. He is of Turkish descent.
