= Nathaniël Will =

Dutch footballer

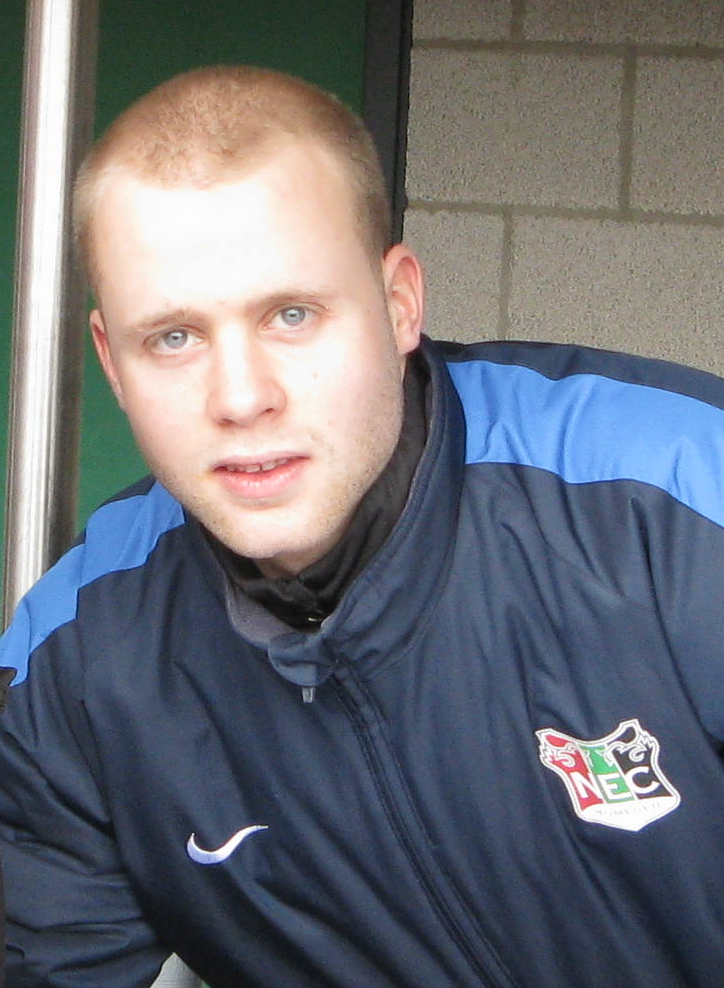

Personal information
- Date of birth: 16 February 1989 (age 37)
- Place of birth: Lelystad, Netherlands
- Height: 1.77 m (5 ft 10 in)
- Position: Right back

Team information
- Current team: Spakenburg
- Number: 2

Youth career
- 1994–2002: SV Lelystad '67
- 2002–2008: Ajax

Senior career*
Years	Team	Apps	(Gls)
2008–2010	Jong Ajax		
2010–2013	NEC	68	(1)
2013–2017	De Graafschap	97	(1)
2017	RoPS	12	(1)
2018–	Spakenburg	47	(2)
- * Club domestic league appearances and goals as of 13:24, 13 October 2020 (UTC)

Nathaniël Will (Dutch pronunciation: [naːˈtaːnijɛl ˈʋɪl]; born 16 February 1989) is a Dutch footballer who plays as a right back for SV Spakenburg in the Tweede Divisie.

== Career ==
Before joining NEC, he played at Ajax. In June 2007, Will signed his first professional contract with Ajax. After two seasons, he became captain of Jong Ajax in the season 2009–10. Will never made an official appearance for Ajax' first team, but did play a few friendly matches. Right before his contract expired he won the Chippi Polar Cup with Ajax' first team.

Ajax let Will go after his contract expired 30 June 2010. Former NEC-coach Wiljan Vloet signed Will as NEC's right-back for the 2010–11 season. He signed a two-year contract, with a possible extension of two years. After the 2012–13 season, Will was released by NEC.

In August 2017, Will signed a contract until the end of the season with Finnish club RoPS.

On 8 December 2017, SV Spakenburg announced the signing of Will until the end of the 2017–18 season.
