= Victor Șevcenco =

Moldovan footballer

Personal information
- Full name: Victor Șevcenco
- Date of birth: 8 September 1991 (age 35)
- Place of birth: Moldova
- Height: 1.93 m (6 ft 4 in)
- Position: Centre back

Team information
- Current team: Atlantis FC

Senior career*
Years	Team	Apps	(Gls)
–2009	Tiligul-Tiras		
2009–2012	Tighina	12	(0)
2013–2016	TP-47	83	(6)
2017	KPV	21	(2)
2018	PS Kemi	22	(4)
2019	Ballkani	0	(0)
2020–	Atlantis FC	64	(9)
- * Club domestic league appearances and goals as of 7 November 2026

Victor Șevcenco (born 8 September 1991) is a Moldovan professional footballer who plays for Atlantis FC, as a defender.

== Career ==
After one year in Kosovo, Șevcenco returned to Finland and signed with Atlantis FC for the 2020 season.
