= Kalle Mäkinen =

Finnish footballer (born 1989)

Personal information
- Date of birth: 1 February 1989 (age 37)
- Place of birth: Turku, Finland
- Height: 1.78 m (5 ft 10 in)
- Position: Defender

Youth career
- Turun Palloseura

Senior career*
Years	Team	Apps	(Gls)
2008–2012	TPS	15	(0)
2013–2014	MaPS		

International career^{‡}
- Finland U-15
- Finland U-17
- Finland U-18
- Finland U-19
- Finland U-20
- * Club domestic league appearances and goals as of 26 February 2011 ‡ National team caps and goals as of 26 February 2011

Kalle Mäkinen (born 1 February 1989) is a Finnish footballer who last played for the Finnish Veikkausliiga club Maskun Palloseura. He was nicknamed "Sergio" because his style of play was similar to that of Spanish fullback Sergio Ramos.
