= Saku Ylätupa =

Finnish footballer (born 1999)

Personal information
- Full name: Saku Tuomas Severi Ylätupa
- Date of birth: 4 August 1999 (age 27)
- Place of birth: Espoo, Finland
- Height: 1.71 m (5 ft 7 1/2 in)
- Position: Midfielder

Team information
- Current team: IF Gnistan
- Number: 23

Youth career
- FC Espoo
- 2016–2017: HJK

Senior career*
Years	Team	Apps	(Gls)
2015–2016	Klubi 04	30	(17)
2016–2017	HJK	0	(0)
2017	→ RoPS (loan)	17	(3)
2017–2019	Jong Ajax	4	(1)
2019–2022	AIK	24	(1)
2020	→ IFK Mariehamn (loan)	8	(0)
2022	GIF Sundsvall	27	(5)
2023–2026	Kalmar FF	27	(2)
2024	→ Helsingør (loan)	8	(0)
2026–	IF Gnistan	26	(2)

International career^{‡}
2014–2016	Finland U17	11	(3)
2016–2017	Finland U18	2	(0)
2016–2018	Finland U19	17	(3)
2018–	Finland U21	15	(2)
2019–	Finland	3	(0)
- * Club domestic league appearances and goals as of 13 November 2026 ‡ National team caps and goals as of 16 January 2023

Saku Ylätupa (born 4 August 1999) is a Finnish footballer who plays for Veikkausliiga club IF Gnistan. A pacy two-footed Finland international, he prefers to play as an attacking midfielder, but he can also play as a central midfielder, winger or centre-forward.

== Early career ==
Born in Espoo in 1999, Ylätupa started his football career in a youth team of a local club FC Espoo, before joining HJK youth sector. Ylätupa played in Klubi-04, the reserve team of HJK.

== Club career ==
=== HJK ===
In 2016, Ylätupa was called up for HJK first team. On 2 April 2016, Ylätupa made his senior debut in Finnish League Cup against FC Lahti at Talin jalkapallohalli, playing the game as a starting line-up during 46 minutes.

=== Ajax ===
On 21 July 2017, it was announced that the midfielder had signed a three-year contract with Dutch side AFC Ajax.

=== GIF Sundsvall ===
On 10 January 2022, Ylätupa signed a three-year contract with GIF Sundsvall in Allsvenskan for a €125.000 transfer fee.

=== Kalmar FF ===
Following Sundsvall's relegation to the Superettan, on 16 January 2023 Ylätupa officially joined fellow Swedish side Kalmar FF for an undisclosed fee, signing a three-year contract with the club.

==== FC Helsingør (loan) ====
On 5 January 2024, he was sent on loan to Danish club Helsingør for the rest of the 2023–24 season. At the end of the 2023–24 season, which ended with relegation to the Danish 2nd Division for Helsingør, Ylätupa left the club and returned to Kalmar.

== International career ==
He made his debut in the Finland national football team on 8 January 2019 in a friendly against Sweden, as a 68th-minute substitute for Lassi Lappalainen.

== Career statistics ==
=== Club ===
As of 13 November 2026

Club	Season	League			Cup		League Cup		Continental		Total	
Club	Season	Division	Apps	Goals	Apps	Goals	Apps	Goals	Apps	Goals	Apps	Goals
Klubi 04	2015	Kakkonen	14	5	0	0	—		—		14	5
Klubi 04	2016	Kakkonen	16	12	0	0	—		—		16	12
Klubi 04	Total		30	17	0	0	—		—		30	17
HJK	2016	Veikkausliiga	0	0	2	1	3	0	0	0	5	1
HJK	2017	Veikkausliiga	0	0	3	0	0	0	0	0	3	0
HJK	Total		0	0	5	1	3	0	0	0	8	1
RoPS (loan)	2017	Veikkausliiga	17	3	0	0	0	0	—		17	3
Jong Ajax	2018–19	Eerste Divisie	4	1	0	0	—		—		4	1
AIK	2019	Allsvenskan	6	0	5	0	—		0	0	11	0
AIK	2020	Allsvenskan	7	0	5	2	—		—		12	2
AIK	2021	Allsvenskan	11	1	3	1	—		—		14	2
AIK	Total		24	1	13	3	—		0	0	37	4
IFK Mariehamn (loan)	2020	Veikkausliiga	8	0	0	0	0	0	—		8	0
GIF Sundsvall	2022	Allsvenskan	27	5	1	0	–		–		28	5
Kalmar	2023	Allsvenskan	4	0	2	0	–		0	0	6	0
Kalmar	2024	Allsvenskan	8	0	1	1	–		–		9	1
Kalmar	2025	Superettan	15	2	3	1	–		–		18	3
Kalmar	Total		27	2	6	2	0	0	0	0	33	4
Helsingør (loan)	2023–24	Danish 1st Division	8	0	–		–		–		8	0
IF Gnistan	2026	Veikkausliiga	26	2	0	0	1	0	–		27	2
Career total			170	30	25	1	4	0	0	0	199	36

=== International ===
As of match played 12 January 2023

Finland
Year	Apps	Goals
2019	2	0
2020	0	0
2021	0	0
2022	0	0
2023	1	0
Total	3	0
