= Aram Hasanzada =

Iranian-Finnish footballer (born 1994)

Personal information
- Full name: Aram Hasanzada
- Date of birth: 22 April 1994 (age 32)
- Place of birth: Kalas, Iran
- Height: 1.82 m (6 ft 0 in)
- Position: Attacking midfielder

Youth career
- 2006–2011: FC Blackbird
- 2012–2013: Jyväskylä

Senior career*
Years	Team	Apps	(Gls)
2009	FC Blackbird	1	(0)
2012	→ Warkaus JK (loan)	1	(0)
2013–2016	Jyväskylä	19	(2)
2017–2018	KPV	23	(0)
- * Club domestic league appearances and goals as of 29 May 2019

Aram Hasanzada (Persian: آرام حسن زاده; born April 22, 1994) is a Kurdish-Finnish footballer.

== Career statistics ==
As of 1 June 2019

Club	Season	Division	League		Cup		Other		Total	
Club	Season	Division	Apps	Goals	Apps	Goals	Apps	Goals	Apps	Goals
FC Blackbird	2009	Kakkonen	1	0	0	0	—		1	0
Warkaus JK	2012	Kakkonen	1	0	0	0	—		1	0
Jyväskylä	2013	Veikkausliiga	4	0	0	0	—		4	0
Jyväskylä	2014	Ykkönen	12	2	3	0	—		15	2
Jyväskylä	2015	Ykkönen	3	0	0	0	—		3	0
Jyväskylä	Total		19	2	3	0	—		22	2
KPV	2017	Ykkönen	14	0	6	3	—		20	3
KPV	2018	Ykkönen	9	0	5	1	0	0	14	1
KPV	Total		23	0	11	4	0	0	34	4
Career total			44	2	14	4	0	0	58	6
