= 2010–11 Olympique de Marseille season =

Marseille
2010–11 season
- Chairman: Jean-Claude Dassier
- Manager: Didier Deschamps
- Ground: Stade Vélodrome
- Ligue 1: 2nd
- Coupe de France: Round of 64
- Coupe de la Ligue: Winners
- Trophée des Champions: Winners
- UEFA Champions League: Round of 16
- Top goalscorer: League: Loïc Rémy (14); All: Loïc Rémy (16)
Home colours	Away colours	Third colours

The 2010–11 season of Olympique de Marseille (OM) has the club being involved in four competitions: the Ligue 1, the Coupe de France, the League Cup, and the UEFA Champions League. l'OM will be trying to defend their Ligue 1 title after previously placing first in the 2009–10 Ligue 1.

== Key dates ==
28 July 2010: Marseille win the Trophée des Champions in a penalty shootout against Paris Saint Germain;

7 August 2010: Ligue 1 title holders Marseille suffer an opening day loss to the newly promoted Caen;

4 November 2010: Marseille go into the history books by beating Žilina 7–0 at the Štadión pod Dubňomin Slovakia, thus achieving the biggest away win in the Champions League.

== Club ==
=== Coaching staff ===
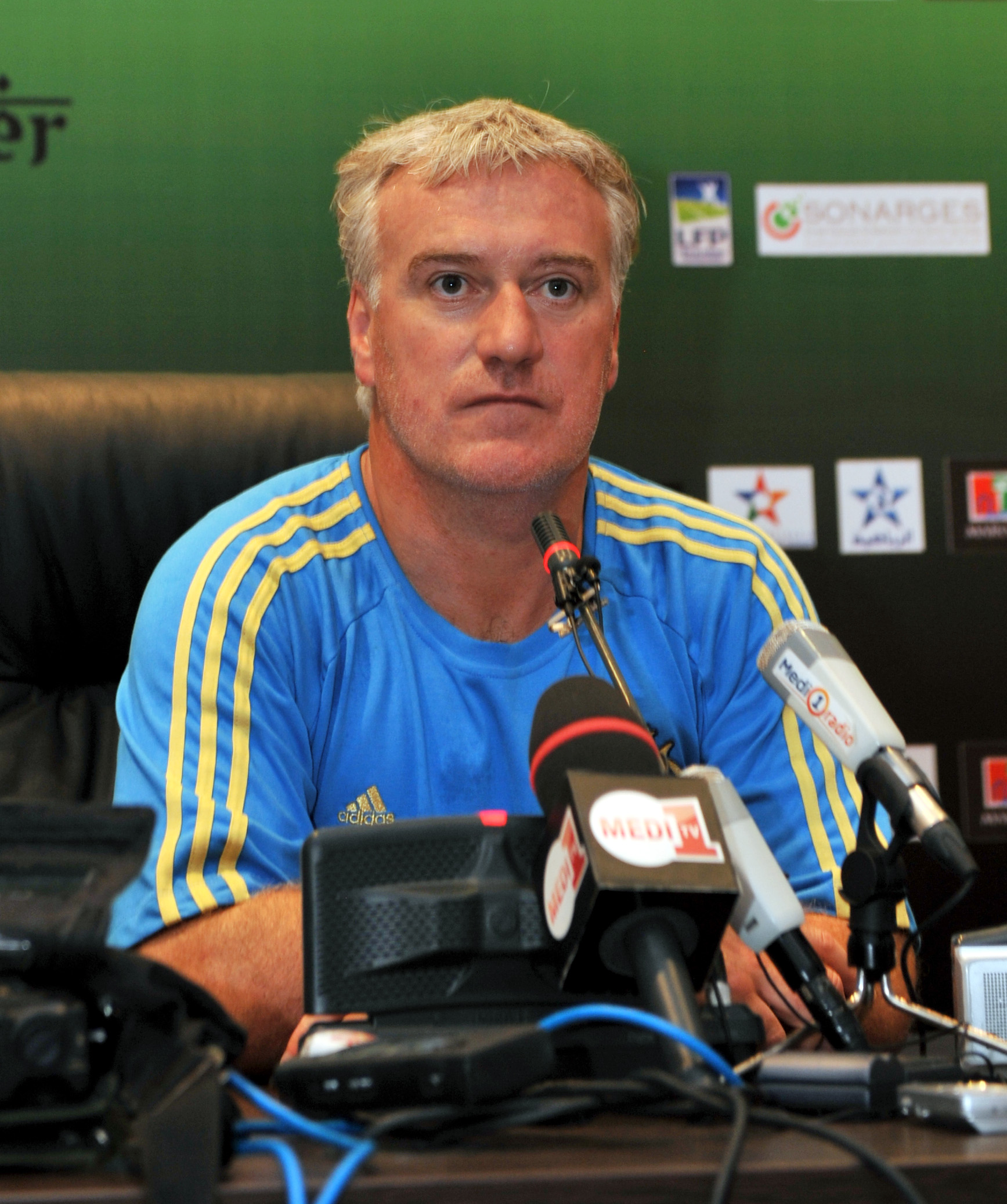
This is Didier Deschamps' second season with Marseille as a coach.

Position	Staff
Coach	(France) Didier Deschamps
Assistant coach	(France) Guy Stéphan
Goalkeeping coach	(France) Nicolas Dehon
Fitness coach	(France) Antonio Pintus
Club doctor	(France) Christophe Baudot
Chief scout	(France) Jean-Philippe Durand

Last updated: 8 February 2011
Source: Olympique de Marseille

=== Kit ===
For the 2010–11 season, Adidas introduced Marseille's new kits, much different to last season, save for the home kit. The colours of Marseille remain white and sky blue. The away kit is sky blue and has shades of black. The third kit is for use in European competitions only; it is a black kit which has a sky blue collar outline. All of Marseille's kits embody sky blue, one of their main colours.

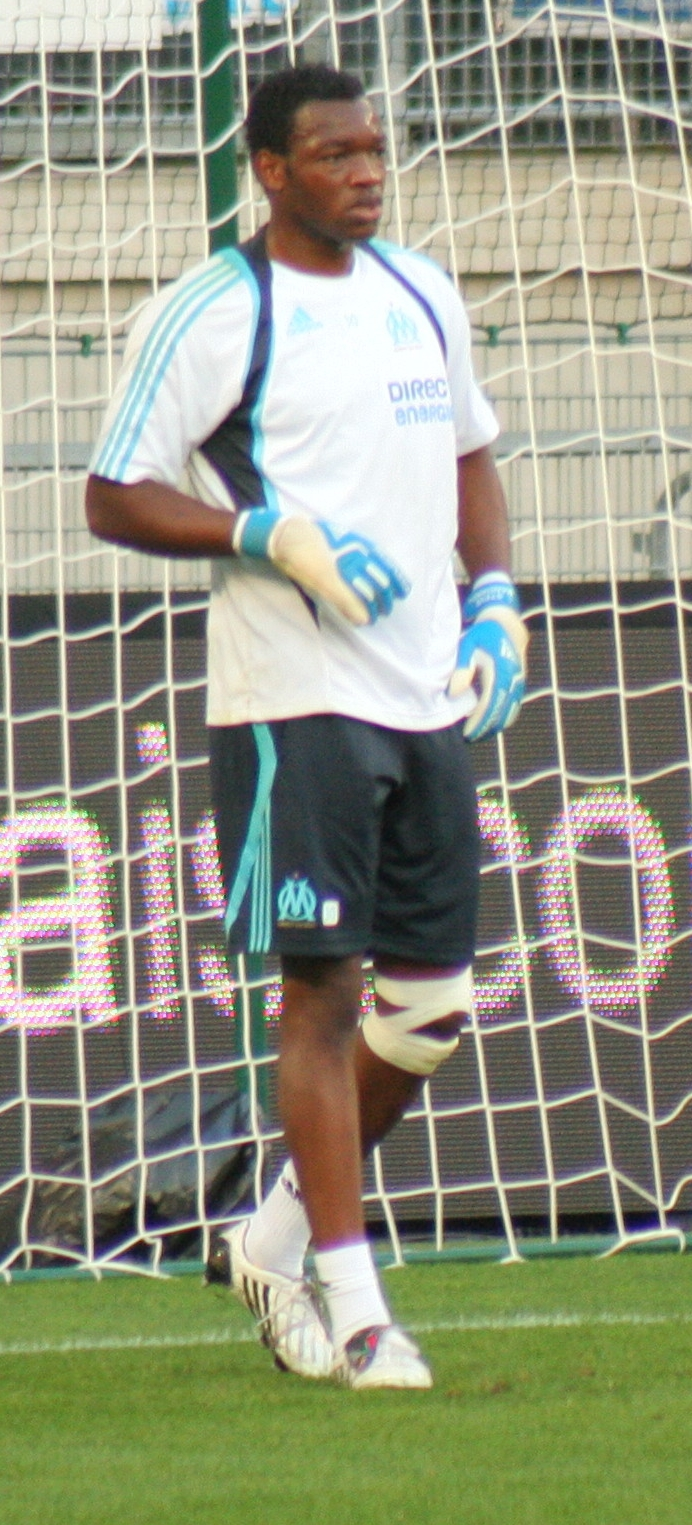
Steve Mandanda in l'OM's training outfit.

Home	Away	Third

Supplier : Adidas

Sponsor : BetClic

=== Other information ===
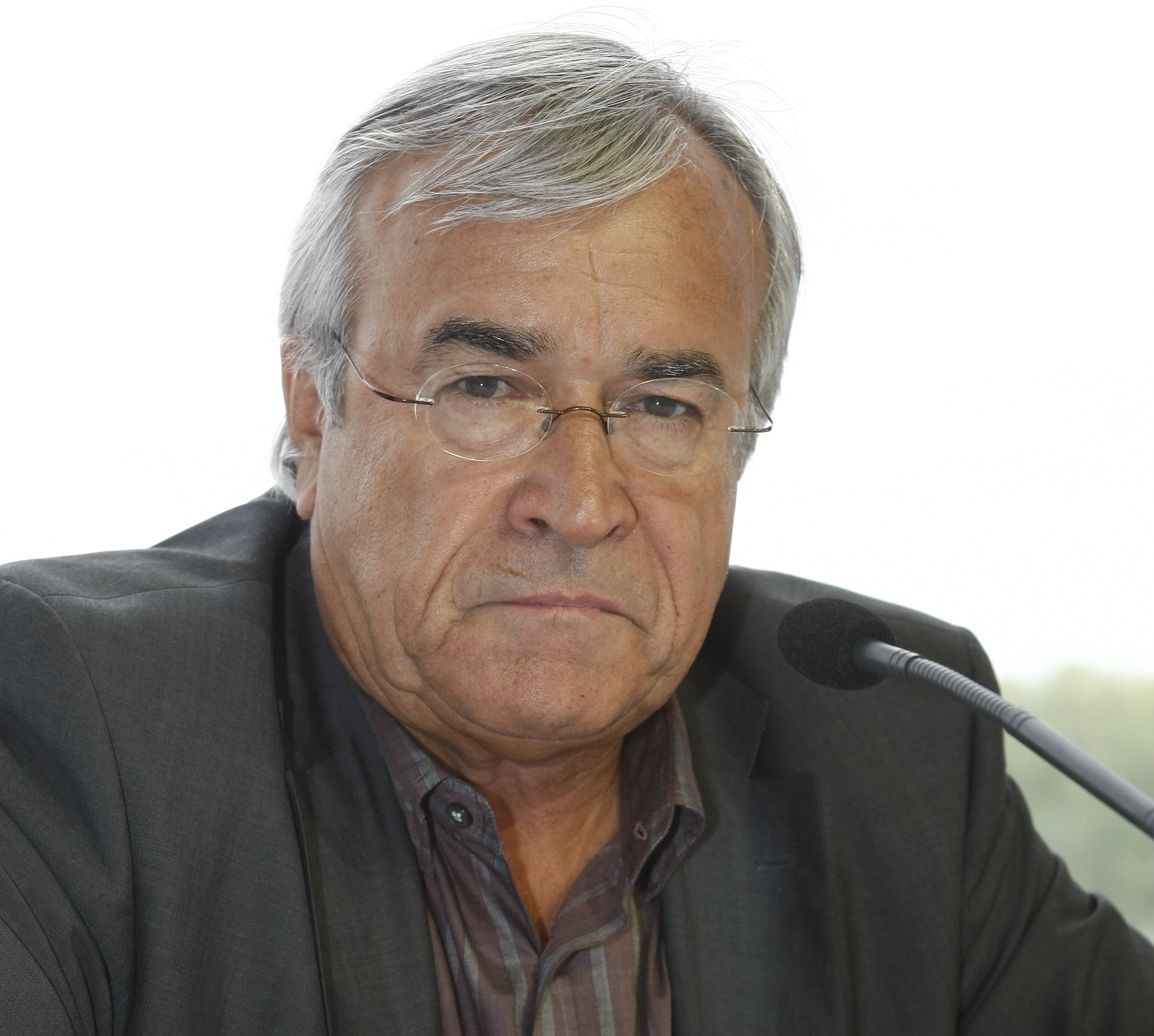
Jean-Claude Dassier is the chairman of the club since June 2009.

Chairman	(France) Jean-Claude Dassier
Ground (capacity and dimensions)	Stade Vélodrome (60,013 / {{{d}}})

Updated to match played 8 February 2009

== Squad ==
=== First Team ===
Updated 5 February 2011. Note: Flags indicate national team as defined under FIFA eligibility rules; some limited exceptions apply. Players may hold more than one non-FIFA nationality.

No.	Pos.	Nation	Player
2	DF	ESP	César Azpilicueta
3	DF	NGR	Taye Taiwo
4	DF	FRA	Julien Rodriguez
5	DF	BRA	Hilton
6	MF	FRA	Édouard Cissé
7	MF	FRA	Benoît Cheyrou
8	MF	ARG	Lucho González
9	FW	BRA	Brandão
10	FW	FRA	André-Pierre Gignac
11	FW	FRA	Loïc Rémy
12	MF	BFA	Charles Kaboré
13	DF	TOG	Senah Mango
14	DF	SEN	Leyti N'Diaye
15	FW	GHA	Jordan Ayew

No.	Pos.	Nation	Player
16	GK	BRA	Elinton Andrade
17	MF	CMR	Stéphane Mbia
18	MF	FRA	Fabrice Abriel
19	DF	ARG	Gabriel Heinze
20	MF	GHA	André Ayew
21	DF	SEN	Souleymane Diawara
23	MF	GAB	Alexander N'Doumbou
24	DF	FRA	Rod Fanni
25	DF	FRA	Cédric D'Ulivo
26	DF	FRA	Jean-Philippe Sabo
28	MF	FRA	Mathieu Valbuena
30	GK	FRA	Steve Mandanda
40	GK	CMR	Jules Goda

==== Out on loan ====
Note: Flags indicate national team as defined under FIFA eligibility rules; some limited exceptions apply. Players may hold more than one non-FIFA nationality.

No.	Pos.	Nation	Player
20	DF	CMR	Charley Fomen (at Dijon until end of the 2010–11 season)
27	DF	SEN	Pape M'Bow (at Cannes until end of the 2010–11 season)

=== Reserve squad ===
Note: Flags indicate national team as defined under FIFA eligibility rules; some limited exceptions apply. Players may hold more than one non-FIFA nationality.

No.	Pos.	Nation	Player
—	GK	MAR	Samir Kouakbi
—	GK	SLO	Brice Krizman
—	DF	FRA	Fabien Barrillon
—	DF	ARM	Varanth Bezdikian
—	DF	FRA	Sébastien Bregand
—	DF	ARG	Sébastien Fischetti
—	DF	CPV	Raphaël Lopes
—	DF	TOG	Senah Mango
—	DF	GLP	Thierry Rodriguez
—	MF	FRA	Landing Bodian
—	MF	FRA	Olivier Cano
—	MF	ARG	Gaëtan D'Acunto
—	MF	BIH	Mathias Guedj

No.	Pos.	Nation	Player
—	MF	ALG	Cédric Hachani
—	MF	SEN	Daouda Haidari
—	MF	CRO	Niko Maričić
—	MF	FRA	Anthony Marin
—	MF	IRI	Ahmad Nouri
—	MF	TUN	Driss Sahraoui
—	FW	GHA	Jordan Ayew
—	FW	FRA	Thierry Batret
—	FW	CPV	Nicolas Crus
—	FW	CPV	Riad Dob
—	FW	FRA	Chris Gadi
—	FW	FRA	Noël Sciortino

== Transfers ==
=== Summer ===
==== In ====
Squad #	Position	Player	Transferred from	Fee	Date	Source
2	DF	(Spain) César Azpilicueta	(Spain) Osasuna	€7 million	21 June 2010	
11	FW	(France) Loic Remy	(France) Nice	€15 million	19 August 2010	
10	FW	(France) Andre-Pierre Gignac	(France) Tolouse	€18 million	20 August 2010	

==== Out ====
Squad #	Position	Player	Transferred To	Fee	Date	Source
14	ST	(Ivory Coast) Bakari Koné	(Qatar) Lekqiya	€5 million	26 May 2010	
9	ST	(Senegal) Mamadou Niang	(Turkey) Fenerbahçe	€8 million	14 August 2010	

== Pre-season and friendlies ==
Marseille starts its 2010–2011 season with a five-game preparation program, spread over July and August, before the start of official competitions. The scheduled match on 24 July against Porto was canceled and replaced by an encounter with Valencia, as well as Catania. On 1 August, there was a tribute to Robert Louis-Dreyfus in a game at the Stade Vélodrome against Valencia. It is also proposed to extend this type of game all year. On 3 September, Marseille have planned to face Ajaccio in the challenge Michael Moretti, won by the Ajaccio at the beginning of the 2008–09 season.

9 July 2010	Vannes OC	0–2	Marseille	Vannes
19:00 CEST		(Report)	35' (pen.) J. Ayew; 37' (pen.) Niang	Stadium: Stade de la Rabine; Attendance: 7,943; Referee: Bartolomeu Varela (France)

16 July 2010	Marseille	0–1	Monaco	Cannes
20:00 CEST		(Report)	70' (o.g.) Mango	Stadium: Stade Pierre-de-Coubertin; Attendance: 2,500; Referee: Sébastien Moreira (France)

21 July 2010	Marseille	2–4	Toulouse	Bayonne
20:30 CEST	Congré 28' (o.g.); Niang 34' (pen.)	(Report)	8' Machado; 57' Braaten; 66' É. Didot; 82' Capoue	Stadium: Stade Jean Dauger; Attendance: 6,000; Referee: Hervé Piccirillo (France)

24 July 2010	Marseille	2–0	Catania	Valence
19:00 CEST	N'Diaye 7'; Brandão 70' (pen.)	(Report)		Stadium: Stade Georges Pompidou; Referee: Philippe Malige (France)

1 August 2010	Marseille	1–0	Valencia	Marseille
21:00 CEST	Ben Arfa 70'	(Report)		Stadium: Stade Vélodrome; Attendance: 28,370; Referee: Nicolas Rainville (France)

3 September 2010	Ajaccio	1–1 (6–5 p)	Marseille	Ajaccio
19:00 CEST	Begeorgi 42' (pen.)	(Report)	22' Gignac	Stadium: Stade François Coty; Referee: Dany Gérard (France)
	Penalties
	(penalty scored) Delort; (penalty missed) El Hany; (penalty scored) Lasne; (penalty missed) Poulard; (penalty scored) André; (penalty scored) Kinkela; (penalty scored) Cilia; (penalty scored) D'Ulivo		(penalty scored) Gignac; (penalty scored) Taiwo; (penalty missed) Abriel; (penalty missed) Moulet; (penalty scored) Hilton; (penalty scored) Laassami; (penalty scored) Sabo; (penalty missed) Cissé

5 January 2011	Cartagena B	1–3	Marseille	La Manga
17:00 CET	Luqui 56'	(Report)	21' J. Ayew; 43' Brandão; 54' N'Doumbou	Stadium: La Manga Stadium; Attendance: 187; Referee: Fran Gomez Liarte (Spain)

== Competitions ==
=== Trophée des Champions ===
28 July 2010 Final	Marseille	0–0 (5–4 p)	Paris Saint-Germain	Tunis, Tunisia
20:45 CEST		Report		Stadium: Stade 7 Novembre; Attendance: 57,000; Referee: Aouaz Trabelsi (Tunisia)
	Penalties
	Taiwo (penalty scored); Ben Arfa (penalty scored); Lucho (penalty missed); Kaboré (penalty scored); Gnabouyou (penalty scored); Cissé (penalty scored)		(penalty missed) Luyindula; (penalty scored) Jallet; (penalty scored) Nenê; (penalty scored) Kežman; (penalty scored) Makélélé; (penalty missed) Giuly

=== Ligue 1 ===
==== League table ====
Pos	Team	Pld	W	D	L	GF	GA	GD	Pts	Qualification or relegation
1	Lille (C)	38	21	13	4	68	36	+32	76	Qualification to Champions League group stage
2	Marseille	38	18	14	6	62	39	+23	68	Qualification to Champions League group stage
3	Lyon	38	17	13	8	61	40	+21	64	Qualification to Champions League play-off round
4	Paris Saint-Germain	38	15	15	8	56	41	+15	60	Qualification to Europa League play-off round (Note: As 2010–11 Coupe de France winners Lille qualified for the UEFA Champions League and cup runners-up Paris St. Germain were already ensured of a UEFA Europa League spot via league placement, the play-off round berth reserved for the cup winners was awarded to Sochaux, the fifth-placed team.)
5	Sochaux	38	17	7	14	60	43	+17	58	Qualification to Europa League play-off round

Source: Ligue 1
Rules for classification: 1) points; 2) goal difference; 3) number of goals scored.
(C) Champions

==== Results summary ====
Overall								Home						Away					
Pld	W	D	L	GF	GA	GD	Pts	W	D	L	GF	GA	GD	W	D	L	GF	GA	GD
38	18	14	6	62	39	+23	68	10	7	2	34	19	+15	8	7	4	28	20	+8

Source: soccerway.com

==== Results by round ====
Round	1	2	3	4	5	6	7	8	9	10	11	12	13	14	15	16	17	18	19	20	21	22	23	24	25	26	27	28	29	30	31	32	33	34	35	36	37	38
Ground	H	A	H	A	H	A	H	A	H	A	H	A	H	A	H	A	A	H	A	H	A	H	A	H	A	H	A	H	A	H	A	H	H	A	H	A	H	A
Result	L	L	W	D	D	W	W	D	W	W	D	L	D	W	W	L	D	D	D	W	D	W	W	W	W	L	W	W	W	D	W	W	D	L	W	D	D	D
Position	15	18	13	10	13	8	6	8	4	2	1	4	6	5	1	4	5	5	5	5	5	4	3	3	3	4	4	2	2	2	2	1	2	2	2	2	2	2

Source: lfp.fr
A = Away; H = Home; W = Win; D = Draw; L = Loss

==== Matches ====
7 August 2010 1	Marseille	1–2	Caen	Marseille
21:00 CEST	Samassa 77'	Report	Seube 52'; El-Arabi 86'	Stadium: Stade Vélodrome; Attendance: 55,790; Referee: Alexandre Castro

14 August 2010 2	Valenciennes	3–2	Marseille	Valenciennes
19:00 CEST	Danic 48'; Pujol 53', 62'	Report	Taiwo 82' (pen.); A. Ayew 85'	Stadium: Stade Nungesser; Attendance: 15,640; Referee: Sébastien Moreira

21 August 2010 3	Marseille	2–0	Lorient	Marseille
19:00 CEST	Heinze 6'; Taiwo 71'	Report		Stadium: Stade Vélodrome; Attendance: 53,389; Referee: Ruddy Buquet

29 August 2010 4	Bordeaux	1–1	Marseille	Bordeaux
21:00 CEST	Modeste 88'	Report	Lucho 12'; Cissé (red card) 34'	Stadium: Stade Chaban-Delmas; Attendance: 32,805; Referee: Tony Chapron

12 September 2010 5	Marseille	2–2	Monaco	Marseille
21:00 CEST	Valbuena 42'; Adriano 80' (o.g.)	Report	Niculae 15'; Park 79'	Stadium: Stade Vélodrome; Attendance: 49,384; Referee: Stéphane Lannoy

18 September 2010 6	Arles-Avignon	0–3	Marseille	Avignon
21:00 CEST		Report	32' Cheyrou; 37', 54' A. Ayew	Stadium: Parc des Sports; Attendance: 15,003; Referee: Saïd Ennjimi

25 September 2010 7	Marseille	2–1	Sochaux	Marseille
19:00 CEST	Taiwo 19'; Lucho 61'	Report	76' Maurice-Belay	Stadium: Stade Vélodrome; Attendance: 49,895; Referee: Laurent Duhamel

2 October 2010 8	Saint-Étienne	1–1	Marseille	Saint-Étienne
21:00 CEST	Batlles 59'	Report	27' Gignac	Stadium: Stade Geoffroy-Guichard; Attendance: 35,003; Referee: Stéphane Bré

16 October 2010 9	Marseille	1–0	Nancy	Marseille
21:00CEST	Rémy 27'	Report		Stadium: Stade Vélodrome; Attendance: 48,306; Referee: Philippe Malige

24 October 2010 10	Lille	1–3	Marseille	Villeneuve d'Ascq
21:00 CEST	Cabaye 26'	Report	53', 80' Rémy; 71' Lucho	Stadium: Stade Lille-Metropole; Attendance: 17,305; Referee: Hervé Piccirillo

7 November 2010 12	Paris Saint-Germain	2–1	Marseille	Paris
21:00 CET	Erdinç 9'; Hoarau 19'	Report	24' Lucho	Stadium: Parc des Princes; Attendance: 40,234; Referee: Stéphane Lannoy

13 November 2010 13	Marseille	1–1	Lens	Marseille
19:00 CET	Mbia 6'	Report	58' Eduardo	Stadium: Stade Vélodrome; Attendance: 50,073; Referee: Pascal Vileo

20 November 2010 14	Toulouse	0–1	Marseille	Toulouse
19:00 CET		Report	88' A. Ayew	Stadium: Stadium Municipal; Attendance: 30,256; Referee: Laurent Duhamel

27 November 2010 15	Marseille	4–0	Montpellier	Marseille
19:00 CET	Lucho 20'; Cheyrou 28'; Valbuena 65'; Rémy 90+2'	Report		Stadium: Stade Vélodrome; Attendance: 51,237; Referee: Alexandre Castro

1 December 2010 11	Marseille	0–0	Rennes	Marseille
19:00 CET		Report		Stadium: Stade Vélodrome; Attendance: 50,057; Referee: Ruddy Buquet

5 December 2010 16	Nice	1–0	Marseille	Nice
17:00 CET	Faé 90+2'	Report		Stadium: Stade Municipal du Ray; Attendance: 12,415; Referee: Saïd Ennjimi

11 December 2010 17	Auxerre	1–1	Marseille	Auxerre
21:00 CET	Birsa 40' (pen.)	Report	8' Rémy; (red card) 38' Mbia	Stadium: Stade de l'Abbé-Deschamps; Attendance: 16,104; Referee: Fredy Fautrel

19 December 2010 18	Marseille	1–1	Lyon	Marseille
21:00 CET	Valbuena 51'	Report	35' Lisandro	Stadium: Stade Vélodrome; Attendance: 54,290; Referee: Clément Turpin

22 December 2010 19	Brest	0–0	Marseille	Brest
19:00 CET		Report	(yellow card) 79' (yellow-red card) 85' Kaboré	Stadium: Stade Francis-Le Blé; Attendance: 15,154; Referee: Hervé Piccirillo

16 January 2011 20	Marseille	2–1	Bordeaux	Marseille
21:00 CET	Gignac 23'; Brandão 45+1'	Report	74' (pen.) Modeste	Stadium: Stade Vélodrome; Attendance: 48,147; Referee: Stéphane Bré

30 January 2011 21	Monaco	0–0	Marseille	Fontvieille, Monaco
21:00 CET		Report		Stadium: Stade Louis II; Attendance: 10,959; Referee: Saïd Ennjimi

5 February 2011 22	Marseille	1–0	Arles-Avignon	Marseille
19:00 CET	Gignac 55'	Report		Stadium: Stade Vélodrome; Attendance: 47,737; Referee: Bruno Coué

12 February 2011 23	Sochaux	1–2	Marseille	Montbéliard
19:00 CET	Ideye 44'	Report	45', 70' Gignac	Stadium: Stade Auguste Bonal; Attendance: 19,905; Referee: Philippe Malige

19 February 2011 24	Marseille	2–1	Saint-Étienne	Marseille
19:00 CET	Lucho 69'; Rémy 79'	Report	90+4' Landrin	Stadium: Stade Vélodrome; Attendance: 53,494; Referee: Ruddy Buquet

27 February 2011 25	Nancy	1–2	Marseille	Nancy
17:00 CET	Féret 34'	Report	45+1', 87' A. Ayew	Stadium: Stade Marcel Picot; Attendance: 20,019; Referee: Stéphane Lannoy

6 March 2011 26	Marseille	1–2	Lille	Marseille
21:00 CET	Rémy 55'	Report	10' Hazard; 90+1' Frau	Stadium: Stade Vélodrome; Attendance: 52,960; Referee: Johan Hamel

11 March 2011 27	Rennes	0–2	Marseille	Rennes
21:00 CET		Report	23' Rémy; 80' Lucho	Stadium: Stade de la Route de Lorient; Attendance: 29,002; Referee: Clément Turpin

20 March 2011 28	Marseille	2–1	Paris Saint-Germain	Marseille
21:00 CET	Heinze 16'; A. Ayew 35'	Report	27' Chantôme	Stadium: Stade Vélodrome; Attendance: 52,792; Referee: Stéphane Bré

3 April 2011 29	Lens	0–1	Marseille	Lens
20:45 CEST		Report	69' Cheyrou	Stadium: Stade Félix-Bollaert; Attendance: 40,852; Referee: Philippe Kalt

10 April 2011 30	Marseille	2–2	Toulouse	Marseille
17:00 CEST	Rémy 30'; Gignac 84'	Report	45+2' Braaten; 61' Cetto	Stadium: Stade Vélodrome; Attendance: 50,698; Referee: Lionel Jaffredo

17 April 2011 31	Montpellier	1–2	Marseille	Montpellier
17:00 CEST	Giroud 64'; El Kaoutari (yellow card) 80' (yellow-red card)	Report	69' Gignac; 82' (pen.) Taiwo; (red card) 79' Rémy	Stadium: Stade de la Mosson; Attendance: 25,119; Referee: Stéphane Lannoy

27 April 2011 32	Marseille	4–2	Nice	Marseille
19:00 CEST	A. Ayew 30', 60', 90'; J. Ayew 78'	Report	42' A. Traoré; 90+3' Civelli	Stadium: Stade Vélodrome; Attendance: 49,574; Referee: Laurent Duhamel

1 May 2011 33	Marseille	1–1	Auxerre	Marseille
17:00 CEST	Valbuena 56'	Report	77' Jung	Stadium: Stade Vélodrome; Attendance: 53,578; Referee: Hervé Piccirillo

8 May 2011 34	Lyon	3–2	Marseille	Lyon
21:00 CEST	Lisandro 25' (pen.); Delgado 69'; Cris 84'	Report	70' Lucho; 78' Rémy	Stadium: Stade de Gerland; Attendance: 39,548; Referee: Stéphane Lannoy

11 May 2011 35	Marseille	3–0	Brest	Marseille
21:00 CEST	Rémy 12'; J. Ayew 59'; Heinze 81'	Report		Stadium: Stade Vélodrome; Attendance: 46,313; Referee: Saïd Ennjimi

15 May 2011 36	Lorient	2–2	Marseille	Lorient
21:00 CEST	L. Koné 47'; Gameiro 80'	Report	14' Rémy; 88' Gignac	Stadium: Stade du Moustoir; Attendance: 16,956; Referee: Tony Chapron

21 May 2011 37	Marseille	2–2	Valenciennes	Marseille
20:00 CEST	A. Ayew 34'; Rémy 37'	Report	33' Kadir; 66' R. Gomis	Stadium: Stade Vélodrome; Attendance: 52,923; Referee: Stéphane Bré

29 May 2011 38	Caen	2–2	Marseille	Caen
20:00 CEST	Mollo 7'; Niang 45'		68', 87' Rémy	Stadium: Stade Michel d'Ornano; Attendance: 20,540; Referee: Antony Gautier

=== Coupe de France ===
9 January 2011 Round of 64	Evian	3–1	Marseille	Annecy
20:45 CET	Barbosa 12'; Sagbo 15'; Bérigaud 86'	Report	81' (o.g.) Cambon	Stadium: Parc des Sports; Attendance: 12,246; Referee: Damien Ledentu (France)

=== Coupe de la Ligue ===
27 October 2010 Round of 16	Guingamp	0–1	Marseille	Guingamp
17:00 CET		Report	42' A. Ayew	Stadium: Stade du Roudourou; Attendance: 17,037; Referee: Laurent Duhamel (France)

10 November 2010 Quarter-finals	Marseille	2–1	Monaco	Marseille
20:45 CET	A. Ayew 42'; Azpilicueta 60'	Report	22' (pen.) Coutadeur	Stadium: Stade Vélodrome; Attendance: 17,765; Referee: Clément Turpin (France)

19 January 2011 Semi-finals	Auxerre	0–2	Marseille	Auxerre
20:45 CET		Report	45+2' Brandão; 68' Gignac	Stadium: Stade de l'Abbé-Deschamps; Attendance: 17,025; Referee: Laurent Duhamel (France)

26 April 2011 Final	Marseille	1–0	Montpellier	Saint-Denis
20:45 CEST	Taiwo 80'	Report		Stadium: Stade de France; Attendance: 74,259; Referee: Antony Gautier (France)

=== UEFA Champions League ===
==== Group stage ====
Pos	Team	Pld	W	D	L	GF	GA	GD	Pts	Qualification
1	(England) Chelsea	6	5	0	1	14	4	+10	15	Advance to knockout phase
2	(France) Marseille	6	4	0	2	12	3	+9	12	Advance to knockout phase
3	(Russia) Spartak Moscow	6	3	0	3	7	10	−3	9	Transfer to Europa League
4	(Slovakia) Žilina	6	0	0	6	3	19	−16	0	

Source: Soccerway

15 September 2010 1	Marseille (France)	0–1	(Russia) Spartak Moscow	Marseille, France
20:45 CEST		Report	Azpilicueta 81' (o.g.)	Stadium: Stade Vélodrome; Attendance: 45,729; Referee: Florian Meyer (Germany)

28 September 2010 2	Chelsea (England)	2–0	(France) Marseille	London, England
20:45 CEST	Terry 7'; Anelka 28' (pen.)	Report		Stadium: Stamford Bridge; Attendance: 40,675; Referee: Frank De Bleeckere (Belgium)

19 October 2010 3	Marseille (France)	1–0	(Slovakia) Žilina	Marseille, France
20:45 CEST	Diawara 48'	Report		Stadium: Stade Vélodrome; Attendance: 49,250; Referee: István Vad (Hungary)

3 November 2010 4	Žilina (Slovakia)	0–7	(France) Marseille	Žilina, Slovakia
20:45 CET		Report	Gignac 12', 21', 54'; Heinze 24'; Rémy 36'; Lucho 52', 63'	Stadium: Štadión pod Dubňom; Attendance: 9,664; Referee: Stefan Johannesson (Sweden)

23 November 2010 5	Spartak Moscow (Russia)	0–3	(France) Marseille	Moscow, Russia
18:30 CET		Report	Valbuena 18'; Rémy 54'; Brandão 68'	Stadium: Luzhniki Stadium; Attendance: 43,217; Referee: Wolfgang Stark (Germany)

8 December 2010 6	Marseille (France)	1–0	(England) Chelsea	Marseille, France
20:45 CET	Brandão 81'	Report		Stadium: Stade Vélodrome; Attendance: 50,604; Referee: Vladislav Bezborodov (Russia)

==== Knockout phase ====
===== Round of 16 =====
23 February 2011 First leg	Marseille (France)	0–0	(England) Manchester United	Marseille, France
20:45 CET		Report		Stadium: Stade Vélodrome; Attendance: 57,957; Referee: Felix Brych (Germany)

15 March 2011 Second leg	Manchester United (England)	2–1 (2–1 agg.)	(France) Marseille	Manchester, England
20:45 CET	Hernández 5', 75'	Report	Brown 82' (o.g.)	Stadium: Old Trafford; Attendance: 73,996; Referee: Carlos Velasco Carballo (Spain)

== Statistics ==
=== Appearances and goals ===
Last updated on 30 December.

No.	Pos	Nat	Player	Total		Ligue 1		Champions League		Coupe de France		Coupe de la ligue	
No.	Pos	Nat	Player	Apps	Goals	Apps	Goals	Apps	Goals	Apps	Goals	Apps	Goals
1	GK	(France) FRA	Rudy Riou	0	0	0	0	0	0	0	0	0	0
2	DF	(Spain) ESP	César Azpilicueta	18	1	13	0	4	0	0	0	1	1
3	DF	(Nigeria) NGR	Taye Taiwo	39	5	29	4	5	0	1	0	4	1
4	DF	(France) FRA	Julien Rodriguez	0	0	0	0	0	0	0	0	0	0
5	DF	(Brazil) BRA	Hilton	8	0	7	0	1	0	0	0	0	0
6	DF	(France) FRA	Édouard Cissé	31	0	23	0	5	0	0	0	3	0
7	MF	(France) FRA	Benoît Cheyrou	45	3	33	3	7	0	1	0	4	0
8	MF	(Argentina) ARG	Lucho González	47	10	34	8	8	2	1	0	4	0
9	FW	(Brazil) BRA	Brandão	30	4	19	1	7	2	1	0	3	1
10	FW	(France) FRA	André-Pierre Gignac	37	12	29	8	5	3	1	0	2	1
11	FW	(France) FRA	Loïc Rémy	39	14	29	12	7	2	1	0	2	0
12	MF	(Burkina Faso) BFA	Charles Kaboré	41	0	32	0	5	0	0	0	4	0
15	DF	(Senegal) SEN	Leyti N'Diaye	7	0	4	0	1	0	1	0	1	0
15	FW	(Ghana) GHA	Jordan Ayew	26	2	20	2	2	0	1	0	3	0
16	GK	(Brazil) BRA	Elinton Andrade	2	0	0	0	0	0	1	0	1	0
17	MF	(Cameroon) CMR	Stéphane Mbia	35	1	24	1	6	0	1	0	4	0
18	MF	(France) FRA	Fabrice Abriel	28	0	21	0	3	0	1	0	3	0
19	DF	(Argentina) ARG	Gabriel Heinze	39	4	29	3	8	1	1	0	1	0
20	FW	(Ghana) GHA	André Ayew	48	12	35	10	8	0	1	0	4	2
21	DF	(Senegal) SEN	Souleymane Diawara	37	1	26	0	7	1	0	0	4	0
23	MF	(France) FRA	Alexander N'Doumbou	0	0	0	0	0	0	0	0	0	0
24	DF	(France) FRA	Rod Fanni	21	0	17	0	2	0	0	0	2	0
24	DF	(France) FRA	Jean-Philippe Sabo	0	0	0	0	0	0	0	0	0	0
28	MF	(France) FRA	Mathieu Valbuena	41	5	30	4	8	1	1	0	2	0
29	FW	(France) FRA	Guy Gnabouyou	1	0	1	0	0	0	0	0	0	0
30	GK	(France) FRA	Steve Mandanda	47	0	36	0	8	0	0	0	3	0
