= Hatem Ben Arfa =

French footballer (born 1987)

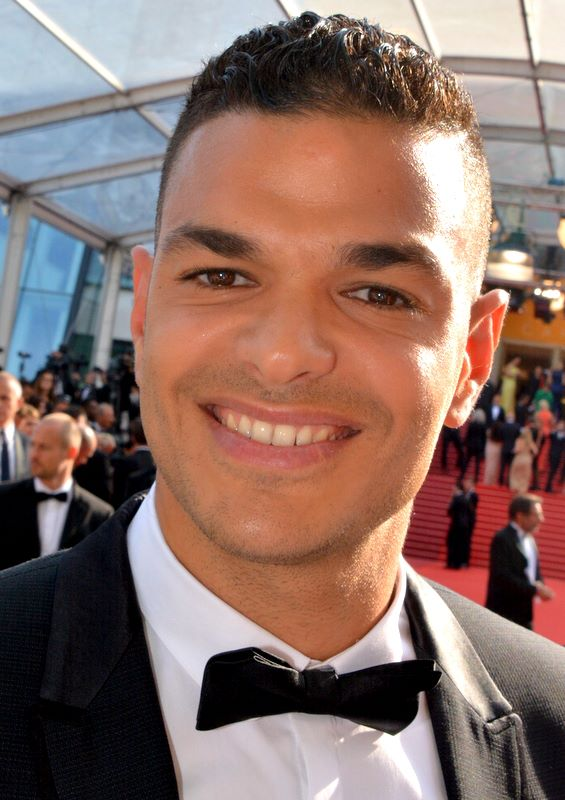
- Ben Arfa at the 2016 Cannes Film Festival

Personal information
- Full name: Hatem Ben Arfa
- Date of birth: 7 March 1987 (age 39)
- Place of birth: Clamart, France
- Height: 1.78 m (5 ft 10 in)
- Positions: Attacking midfielder; winger

Youth career
- 1994–1996: ASV Châtenay-Malabry
- 1996–1998: Montrouge CF 92
- 1998–1999: Boulogne-Billancourt
- 1999–2000: Versailles
- 1999–2002: INF Clairefontaine
- 2002–2004: Lyon

Senior career*
Years	Team	Apps	(Gls)
2004–2008	Lyon	64	(7)
2008–2011	Marseille	63	(9)
2010–2011	→ Newcastle United (loan)	4	(1)
2011–2015	Newcastle United	72	(12)
2014–2015	→ Hull City (loan)	8	(0)
2015–2016	Nice	34	(17)
2016–2018	Paris Saint-Germain	23	(0)
2018–2019	Rennes	26	(7)
2020	Valladolid	5	(0)
2020–2021	Bordeaux	24	(2)
2022	Lille	7	(0)
Total		330	(55)

International career
2002–2003	France U16	10	(7)
2003–2004	France U17	17	(11)
2005	France U18	4	(0)
2005–2006	France U19	6	(1)
2007	France U21	4	(0)
2007–2015	France	15	(2)
Medal record
Representing France
UEFA European Under-17 Championship
Winner	2004
- * Club domestic league appearances and goals

Hatem Ben Arfa (Arabic: حاتم بن عرفة, French pronunciation: [atɛm bɛnaʁfa]; born 7 March 1987) is a French former professional footballer who played as a winger and attacking midfielder. Known for his flair and dribbling ability, Ben Arfa is regarded as a fan favourite with a cult following and one of the greatest dribblers of all time. He was once described as "one of the best-rated talents in France", but was also criticised by the media and players alike for lacking discipline.

Ben Arfa's career started in the Île-de-France region, where he trained at Boulogne-Billancourt and Versailles. In 1999, he was selected to attend the Clairefontaine academy. He spent three years there before leaving for Lyon, where he won four Ligue 1 titles. In his early career at Lyon, he played as a centre forward but moved into a striker role during the 2007–08 season. In the summer of 2008, Ben Arfa signed with rivals Marseille for €11 million in a move that required the intervention of the Ligue de Football Professionnel. With Marseille, he won the 2009–10 league title, his fifth overall, as well as the Coupe de la Ligue in 2010. After two years at Marseille, Ben Arfa joined English club Newcastle United on loan for the 2010–11 season. The deal was made permanent later in the season.

Ben Arfa spent four years at Newcastle, with a loan spell at Hull City in his final season at the club. He signed for Nice in January 2015 but was unable to make his debut until August, having already represented Newcastle United Reserves and Hull City the previous season. He scored 17 goals in 32 league appearances for Nice, attracting the interest of several European clubs, and signed for Paris Saint-Germain on 1 July 2016. After failing to make a competitive appearance in the 2017–18 season, Ben Arfa signed for Rennes, where he won the 2019 Coupe de France over Paris Saint-Germain. He then went on to play for Valladolid and Bordeaux, before joining Lille in 2022.

Ben Arfa is a former French youth international, and played at all levels for France. At the under-17 level, he was a part of the team that won the 2004 UEFA European Under-17 Championship. He was called up to the senior team for the first time in October 2007, for a UEFA Euro 2008 qualifying match against the Faroe Islands. Ben Arfa made a total of fifteen appearances for France, scoring twice.

== Early career ==
Ben Arfa was born into a family with a football history. His father was the former Tunisian international footballer Kamel Ben Arfa. Ben Arfa began his career in France at ASV Châtenay-Malabry. After two years at the club, he moved a few miles north to Montrouge CF 92. In 1998, Ben Arfa joined sporting club AC Boulogne-Billancourt. The following year, he was selected to attend the INF Clairefontaine academy. He was the youngest player in his class, and the only one born in 1987. While at Clairefontaine, he was a part of A la Clairefontaine, a documentary series which chronicled the lives of some of France's top young footballers during their time at the academy. During the series, an episode showed Ben Arfa getting into an argument with Abou Diaby. While training at Clairefontaine during the weekdays, he played for FC Versailles 78 on the weekends.

== Club career ==
=== Lyon ===
Already labeled a prodigy at the age of 15, Ben Arfa joined Lyon, a club that had just won its first ever Ligue 1 championship. In August 2004, after spending two years in the youth divisions of the Lyon academy, he signed his first professional contract, agreeing to a three-year deal despite late interest from English club Chelsea and Dutch outfit Ajax. Along with fellow youth player Karim Benzema, he was promoted to the senior squad and was assigned the number 34 shirt.

Ben Arfa made his professional debut on the opening day of the 2004–05 season against Nice. Lyon won the match 1–0 with a goal from Giovane Élber, a few minutes after Ben Arfa had come on. After making a few substitute appearances, he made his first start on 11 September 2004 in a 2–1 victory over Rennes playing 56 minutes. Ben Arfa scored his first professional goal two months later on 10 November in a Coupe de la Ligue match against Lille, converting from the penalty spot in extra time to give Lyon a 2–1 lead, though Lille scored two late goals, beating Lyon 3–2. He made his UEFA Champions League debut in a group stage match against Manchester United coming on as a substitute for Sidney Govou.

The following season, Ben Arfa switched to the first team number 18 shirt, but his substitute-to-start ratio was still high as seven of his 12 appearances were as a substitute. He scored as Lyon won the 2005 Trophée des Champions. He made his first Champions League start in a 2–1 victory over Norwegian club Rosenborg, providing the assist on the game-winning goal scored by Fred in the last minutes of the match. Ben Arfa scored his first league goal during the 2006–07 season against Sedan just before half-time. The goal proved to be the winner as Lyon won the match 1–0.

After the departure of wingers Florent Malouda and Sylvain Wiltord, new manager Alain Perrin preferred the more modern 4–3–3 formation, and moved Ben Arfa to left wing for the 2007–08 season. Ben Arfa quickly adapted to the position and scored his first goal in a 5–1 demolition of Metz on 15 September, though his performance was overshadowed by a Benzema hat trick. Arguably his best performances in a Lyon shirt came in a period of 12 days, during which he played a league match on 28 October against Paris Saint-Germain and a Champions League game against German club VfB Stuttgart on 7 November. He scored two goals in each match with both results being in favor of Lyon. Following the season, he was named the National Union of Professional Footballers (UNFP) Young Player of the Year.

Despite rumours of a rift between himself and Benzema, Ben Arfa signed a contract extension with Lyon in March 2008 until 2010. However, his career at Lyon reached an impasse after he got into a training session scuffle with Sébastien Squillaci.

=== Marseille ===
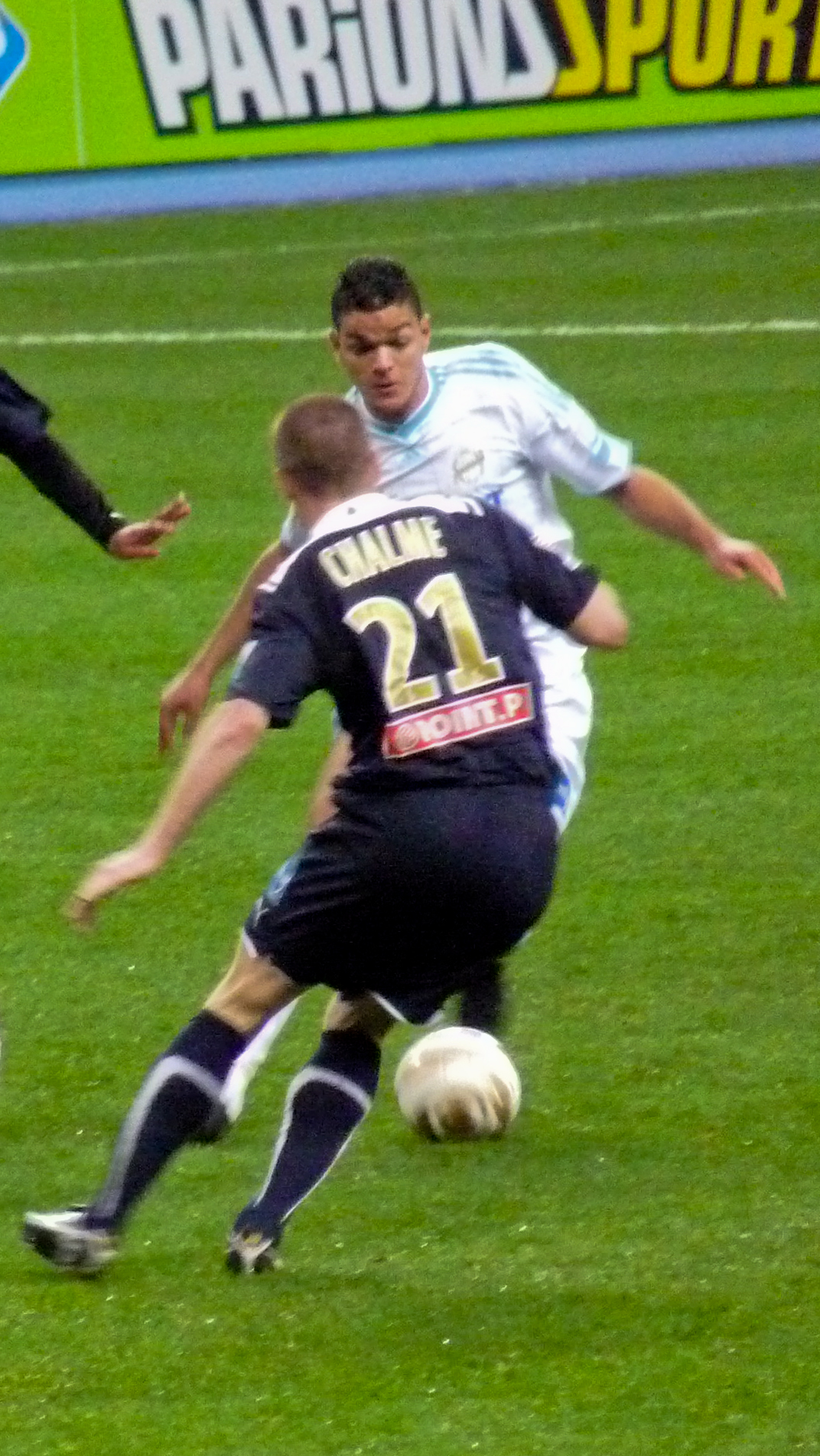
Ben Arfa taking on Bordeaux defender Matthieu Chalmé

Despite reported interest from English clubs Everton, Manchester United, Arsenal, and Spanish club Real Madrid, rumors of a move to rivals Marseille began to surface. On 28 June 2008, Lyon confirmed that a proposed transfer to Marseille had been cancelled for the time being. However, Ben Arfa confirmed to the local La Provence newspaper on 29 June that he had signed for the southern coast club and would not return to Lyon for pre-season training the following day. La Provence later reported that Ben Arfa had in fact missed training in Lyon on 30 June, confirming his intentions.

Ben Arfa officially joined Marseille on 1 July 2008 for €12 million, with future incentives to be included later, after an agreement was reached between Marseille and Lyon in a meeting organized by the Ligue de Football Professionnel. As a result of the disagreement over the transfer, in December 2008, Ben Arfa told the local Lyon newspaper Le Progrès that his former team lacked class and was not a great team. Ben Arfa was presented to the media and had his first training session with the club the same day. He was given the number 20 shirt. On 16 July, Ben Arfa was involved in another training session bust-up, this time with striker and France international player Djibril Cissé. Cissé later joined English club Sunderland on loan.

Ben Arfa made his league debut on the opening day of the season in a 4–4 draw with Rennes. He scored his first goal for Les Marseillais in that match. He continued in form scoring six times in his first 11 matches. However, his reputation for controversy continued to haunt him when he was involved in another dispute, this time with the Cameroon international player Modeste M'bami during a warm up session ahead of the club's UEFA Champions League match against Liverpool. The two had to be separated by Ronald Zubar. Controversy arose again following Marseille's 4–2 loss to Le Classique rivals Paris-Saint Germain. He drew the ire of manager Eric Gerets after his refusal to leave the bench to warm up. Ben Arfa later said he was injured much to the chagrin of Gerets, but later apologized for the incident to the media and Gerets himself. Upon his return to the squad, Ben Arfa responded by scoring a goal and providing the assists on both the other goals in a 3–1 victory over Saint-Étienne.

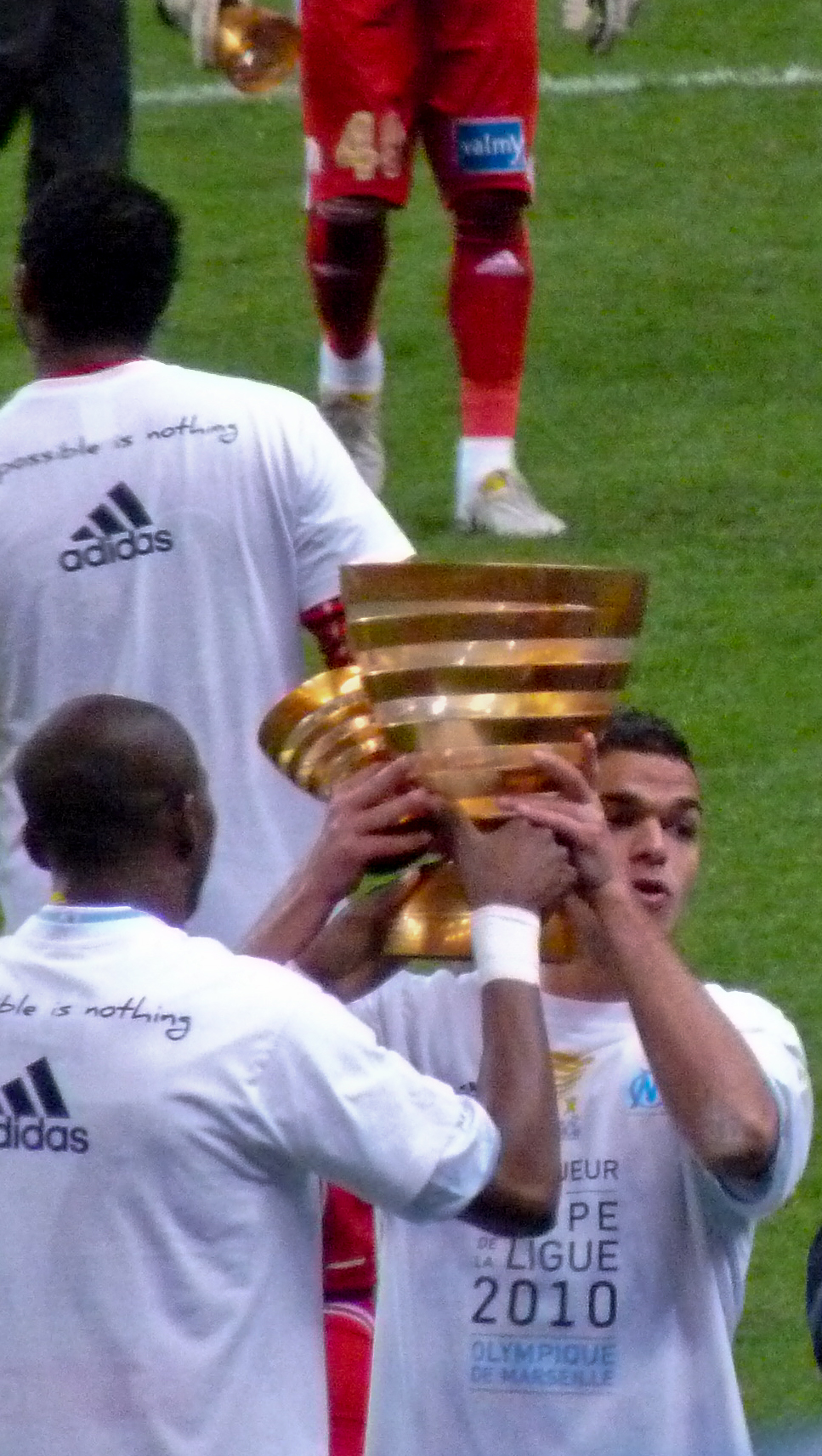
Ben Arfa celebrating the Coupe de la Ligue title in 2010 with Mamadou Niang

Ben Arfa switched to the number 10 shirt for the 2009–10 season and made his debut on the opening match day of the season in a 2–0 away victory over Grenoble appearing as a substitute in the 68th minute. The following week, he earned his first start of the season against Lille and assisted the winning goal scored by Brandão. Controversy surfaced again, however, when, on 8 October 2009, Ben Arfa was fined €10,000 by the club for missing a training session. Ben Arfa blamed the absence on airport delays as he was in Tunisia visiting family members during the international break. A month later, on 18 November, he got into a heated argument with manager Didier Deschamps during a training session, for which Ben Arfa later apologized. Under Deschamps in the first half of the season, Ben Arfa appeared in 15 of the club's 20 league matches and only played the full 90 minutes in two matches, a 2–1 defeat against Monaco and a 2–0 defeat to Auxerre.

Ben Arfa's play during the 2010 portion of the season earned praise from both Deschamps and sporting director José Anigo. On 10 January 2010, Ben Arfa scored his first goal of the season against amateur club Trélissac in the Coupe de France. A month later, he was instrumental in Marseille's 5–1 victory over Valenciennes assisting on the opening goal scored by Lucho González. Later that month, Ben Arfa scored an away goal in the first leg of the club's UEFA Europa League tie against Danish club Copenhagen. In the return leg in Marseille, Ben Arfa struck again, scoring the opening goal in the 43rd minute. Marseille won the match 3–1 and the tie 6–2 on aggregate. On 27 February, he scored his first league goal of the season in a 3–0 victory over Paris Saint-Germain. Ben Arfa's play in the month of February was validated when he was named the UNFP Player of the Month. Marseille won all four of the league matches the team contested with Ben Arfa starting all of them. On 7 April, Ben Arfa converted a penalty in a 3–0 win over Sochaux. The victory placed the club at the top of the table, and they remained there for the rest of the season and clinched the title on 5 May with a 3–1 win over Rennes. Ben Arfa appeared as a substitute in the match.

On 22 July 2010, reports surfaced suggesting that English club Newcastle United were looking to sign Ben Arfa. After being questioned, Newcastle's manager Chris Hughton denied the reports. Five days later, Ben Arfa's agent declared that Newcastle were indeed interested in the player, along with German clubs Hoffenheim and Werder Bremen, Turkish club Galatasaray, and Italian club AC Milan. On 9 August, a season-long loan with an option to make the move permanent was being negotiated between the two clubs; however, a loan-fee for the deal could not be reached with Newcastle offering £650,000; £350,000 short of what Marseille wanted. On 12 August, Marseille president Jean-Claude Dassier announced that Ben Arfa would not be moving to Newcastle and even went as far as to say that an offer from the club had not even existed.

Similar to his actions in leaving Lyon, Ben Arfa responded to the statement by telling the French sports newspaper L'Équipe that he would not be returning to La Commanderie, Marseille's training facility, and would not play with the team for the remainder of the season. He also stated that his relationship with Deschamps had turned sour and was beyond repair. Ben Arfa confirmed his intentions by travelling to Newcastle upon Tyne, without authorization, with hopes that Newcastle and Marseille would come to an agreement. After returning to Marseille, he missed several training sessions with his parent club and was, subsequently, left off the match day squad for two league matches against Valenciennes and Lorient. Ben Arfa's number 10 was later given to new signing André-Pierre Gignac, which signaled a transfer was imminent.

On 19 August, a proposed move to Werder Bremen failed to come to fruition after the club's sporting director Klaus Allofs declared that the club was not interested in Ben Arfa, despite reports of Werder Bremen offering Marseille a transfer fee of €8 million. On 27 August, Dassier confirmed that the club had reached an agreement on a loan fee with Newcastle for the transfer of Ben Arfa with personal terms being the only stumbling block in the deal. Marseille agreed to a £2 million loan fee. Newcastle had been set to pay Marseille another £5 million if Ben Arfa had made 25 club appearances in the 2010–11 season, which would have made the transfer permanent.

=== Newcastle United ===
On 27 August 2010, Ben Arfa agreed to personal terms with Newcastle and, the following day, the club confirmed that it had signed Ben Arfa on a season-long loan. He made his debut on 11 September 2010, appearing as a substitute in a 2–0 defeat at home to Blackpool. He scored his first goal for Newcastle on his full debut on 18 September in the 1–0 victory against Everton. On 3 October, Ben Arfa suffered a broken tibia and fibula in his left leg while playing in a league match against Manchester City. The injury came as a result of a tackle by opposing midfielder Nigel de Jong. On 5 January 2011, Marseille and Newcastle both confirmed on their websites that they had reached an agreement for the permanent transfer of Ben Arfa to Newcastle with the player agreeing to a four-and-a-half-year contract. The transfer fee was undisclosed.

Ben Arfa spent most of his rehabilitation in his home city of Paris recuperating at the Clairefontaine academy. On 23 February, Newcastle manager Alan Pardew confirmed that Ben Arfa was running and could return to the team in April. However, days later, Pardew revealed that he was not prepared to rush the player's rehabilitation process and that Ben Arfa probably would not be available until May, stating "I am going to protect him. I can't just throw him in". Ben Arfa returned to training with Newcastle on 5 April. He participated fully in warm-ups with the first-team, but spent the majority of the training session doing light training and fitness work. Ben Arfa ultimately failed to make any more appearances with the team in the 2010–11 season.

After continuing his rehabilitation during the summer, ahead of the 2011–12 season, Ben Arfa began participating in friendly matches with the senior team. He made his return to the team on 15 July 2011 in a match against Conference National club Darlington. Five days later, in the team's pre-season tour of the United States, he sustained an ankle injury in a match against Sporting Kansas City. Ben Arfa ventured back to his home country to rehab the injury and returned to Newcastle on 18 September. He was, subsequently, named to the first-team to participate in the team's Football League Cup tie against Nottingham Forest on 21 September. Ben Arfa made his season debut in the match against Nottingham Forest appearing as a substitute. Three days later, he made his Premier League return, coming on as a substitute in a 3–1 win over Blackburn Rovers. On 26 December 2011, after going the majority of the autumn campaign without scoring a goal, Ben Arfa scored his first goal of the season in a 2–0 away win over Bolton.

On 7 January 2012, Ben Arfa scored Newcastle's opening goal in its FA Cup third round tie against Blackburn Rovers. The goal, described by BBC Sport as "magical", drew the match 1–1 and Newcastle later went on to win the tie 2–1. On 22 January 2012, Ben Arfa scored in Newcastle's 5–2 defeat to Fulham at Craven Cottage. Two months later, Ben Arfa scored the opener in Newcastle's away league match against Arsenal. The hosts, however, won the match 2–1. On 25 March, he scored one goal and provided the assists on the other two goals in a 3–1 victory against West Brom. Two weeks later, on Easter Monday, Ben Arfa scored again against Bolton Wanderers. The goal, described as "a moment of genius" by British publication The Independent, as he was passed the ball just inside his own half, he proceeded to turn and speed past 4 Bolton players, showing incredible control in doing so, and slotted it past Bolton goalkeeper Ádám Bogdán, the goal was the opener and Newcastle went on to win the match 2–0.

Despite having a disrupted pre-season due to his participation in Euro 2012, Ben Arfa enjoyed a good start to the new Premier League season. On the opening weekend of the season he won and converted a penalty that gave Newcastle a 2–1 victory over Tottenham. Two weeks later, he scored with a spectacular 25-yard drive, on his weaker right foot, to earn Newcastle a point in a 1–1 draw against Aston Villa. He injured his hamstring in a Europa League match against Marítimo, returning in a 2–1 loss to Fulham, in which he scored Newcastle's only goal. However, he aggravated the injury during the match, and did not make an appearance until 7 March 2013 (his 26th birthday), in a Europa League Round of 16 match against Anzhi Makhachkala. Once again, he injured his hamstring which kept him out of the team until the second leg of the Europa League quarter final against Benfica on 11 April, when he came on as a second-half substitute. On 12 May, Ben Arfa scored the equaliser in a 2–1 away win at Loftus Road from the penalty spot as Newcastle confirmed their Premier League status for the next season.

Ben Arfa started the 2013–14 season in a rich vein of form, securing Newcastle's first win of the season by scoring an individual goal against Fulham, and scoring and making an assist in the following game against Aston Villa. Ben Arfa's third goal of the season came when the Frenchman converted a late penalty away at Crystal Palace to help Newcastle ease to 3–0 victory.

==== Loan to Hull City ====
On 2 September 2014, Ben Arfa signed for Hull City on a season-long loan. He made his debut on 15 September, replacing fellow debutant Abel Hernández for the final 11 minutes of a 2–2 home draw against West Ham United. In December 2014, however, Ben Arfa unexpectedly left England, with Hull manager Steve Bruce later admitting he did not know where the player was and that his career with Hull appeared to be over.

On 4 January 2015, Ben Arfa was released from his Newcastle United contract.

=== Nice ===
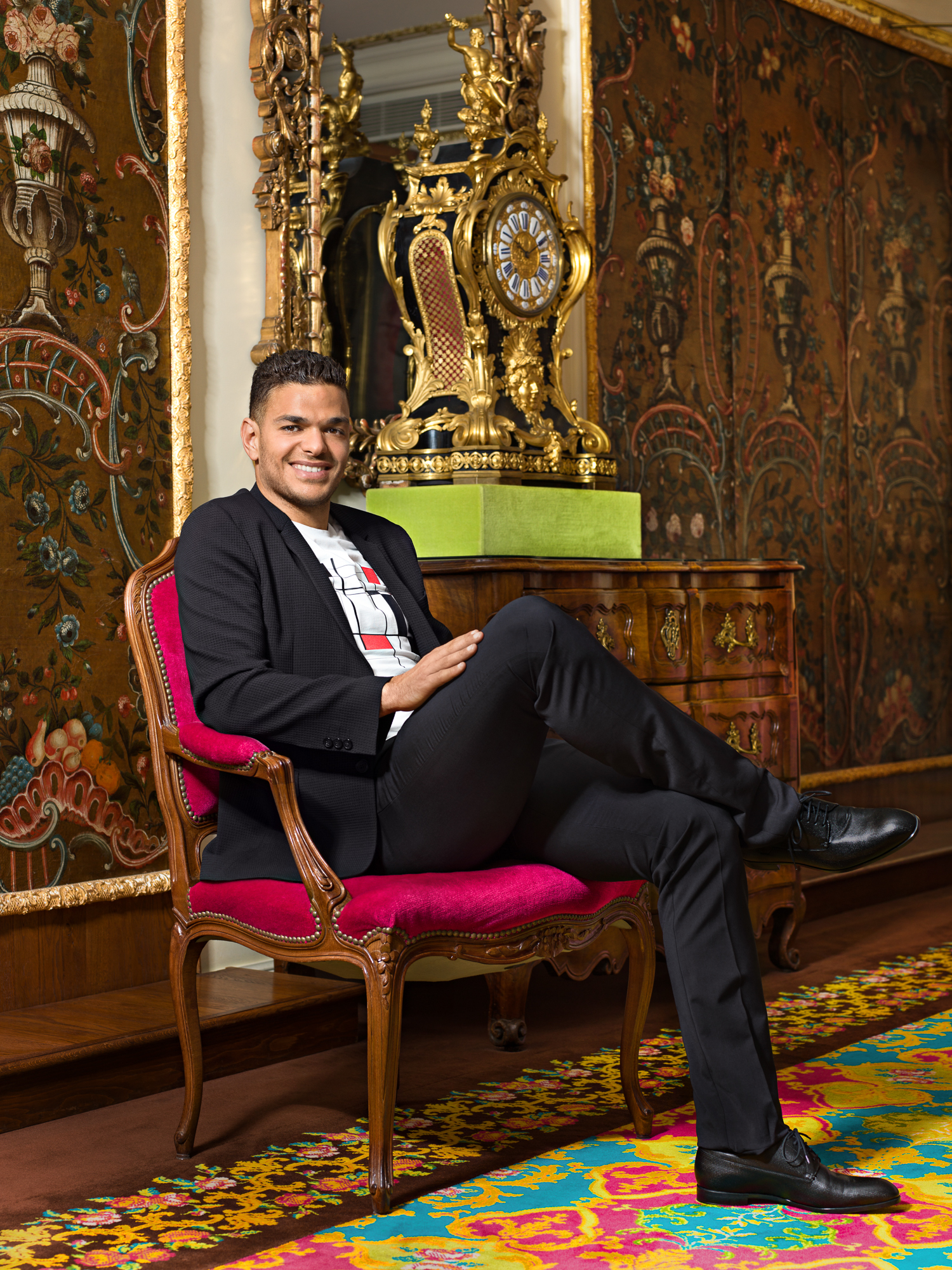
Ben Arfa during his time with Nice, 2016

On 5 January 2015, Ben Arfa signed a deal with Ligue 1 side Nice, stating that "Even if Real Madrid had called at that moment, my mind was made up." He said that he had returned to France because "There are people here who trust me, who do not judge me as some people want to judge me through the press."

Ben Arfa would be ineligible to play for the club, due to a rule that a player can only play for two clubs in a single season, having already played for both Newcastle United Reserves and Hull City. On 3 February, Ben Arfa told a press conference his deal with Nice had been terminated, however, on 9 June, Nice would re-sign Ben Arfa at the start of the 2015–16 Ligue 1 season.

Ben Arfa made his debut for Nice against Monaco in Nice's opening Ligue 1 match of the season on 8 August 2015 at the Allianz Riviera. Seven days later, he scored his first goal for his new club against Troyes from the penalty spot in Nice's second Ligue 1 match of the season, which ended 3–3. In Nice's next Ligue 1 match on 22 August, Ben Arfa scored a solo goal in the 2–1 win against Caen.

=== Paris Saint-Germain ===
On 1 July 2016, amidst reported interest from all over Europe after a season in which he scored 18 goals in 37 matches for Nice, Ben Arfa signed for Paris Saint-Germain on a two-year deal, after his contract ran out at Nice. On 6 August 2016, Ben Arfa scored on his PSG debut, scoring in the 34th minute in a 4–1 victory over his former club Lyon in the 2016 Trophée des Champions. On 1 February 2017, Ben Arfa scored a goal while assisting another two goals in a 4–0 away victory against Rennes in the round of 32 of the 2016–17 Coupe de France. On 5 April, Ben Arfa was handed a rare start (just his ninth of the season) and he scored two goals and provided an assist for Javier Pastore in a 4–0 away victory against Avranches in the quarter-finals of the Coupe de France; that was Ben Arfa's last PSG competitive match of the 2016–17 season. After failing to make a single competitive appearance for PSG in the 2017–18 season, he left the club upon the expiration of his contract in June 2018.

=== Rennes ===
On 2 September 2018, Ben Arfa signed for Rennes on a two-year deal. On 20 September, Ben Arfa made his competitive debut for Rennes in the Europa League Group K 2–1 home win over Jablonec by coming on as a second-half substitute; playing his first competitive match since 5 April 2017, he scored the final goal from a penalty in the 91st minute. On 7 October, Ben Arfa scored the final goal in the 77th minute (his first career Ligue 1 goal for Rennes) after his 14th minute corner had assisted Damien Da Silva's goal in a 2–1 away win over Monaco. On 8 December, Ben Arfa scored the final goal in the 89th minute after he had set up Benjamin Bourigeaud's goal in a 2–0 Ligue 1 home win over Dijon. On 27 April 2019, Ben Arfa won the Coupe de France as Rennes defeated his former club Paris Saint-Germain in the final on penalties.

=== Real Valladolid ===
On 28 January 2020, Ben Arfa signed with La Liga club Real Valladolid on a six-month contract. He chose the number 3 jersey, an uncommon shirt number for an attacker, and explained his choice by stating that "on the shirt, it looks pretty". However, his performances failed to convince, and after a mere five appearances, he left the club as a free agent.

=== Bordeaux ===
On 7 October 2020, Ben Arfa joined Ligue 1 side Bordeaux on a one-year contract. He scored his first goal for the club on 20 November against his former club Rennes. Ben Arfa enjoyed a "good start to the season", scoring two goals and providing five assists in 2020 with Bordeaux. However, he endured a difficult second half of the season, which was marred by injuries and problems in the locker room with several teammates, notably with captain Laurent Koscielny. He also had a deteriorating relationship with manager Jean-Louis Gasset. On 26 May 2021, sporting director Alain Roche confirmed that Ben Arfa would be leaving the club at the end of his contract. He stated that the option for a further year included in Ben Arfa's deal was "conditioned upon sporting criteria" that were not met.

=== Lille ===
On 19 January 2022, Ben Arfa joined reigning Ligue 1 champions Lille on a six-month contract. He made his debut as a substitute in a 2–0 defeat to Brest three days later. On his first start for Les Dogues on 6 February, Ben Arfa went on to provide an assist for Sven Botman's goal in a 5–1 defeat to PSG.

In early April, Ben Arfa was suspended from the Lille squad after a heated altercation with manager Jocelyn Gourvennec following a 0–0 draw to Bordeaux. Ben Arfa had reportedly criticised the way the team was set up, and told Gourvennec that "this isn't Guingamp", a team he formerly coached. He later insulted Gourvennec and Lille president Olivier Létang in an Instagram story, calling them "twisted", a word used by Gourvennec earlier in the day. Gourvennec admitted in a press conference that he had "never seen that in all [of his] career", referring to Ben Arfa's inappropriate behavior in the dressing room following the match.

== International career ==
=== Youth ===
Ben Arfa has earned caps with all of France's youth teams. With the under-16 team, he made ten appearances scoring seven goals. Ben Arfa made his debut with the team at the 2003 edition of the Aegean Cup in Turkey. He scored his first goal in the tournament on 12 January in a 3–2 win over Belgium. The victory assured France a third-place finish. At the Montaigu Tournament, Ben Arfa scored a team-leading six goals. He scored two goals in the team's 8–0 win over Gabon in the opening match. In the following match, Ben Arfa scored the final goal in the team's 3–0 win over Russia and, in the final group stage match, bagged another double in a 3–1 victory over England. He capped the tournament by scoring a goal in the final against Italy, though France lost the match 5–1.

Ben Arfa made his debut with the under-17 team in the opening match of the season against Sweden converting a first-half hat-trick in a 5–2 victory. In the Tournio de Val-de-Marne, Ben Arfa scored two goals as France were crowned champions without conceding a goal. At the 2004 UEFA European Under-17 Football Championship, Ben Arfa, alongside teammates Samir Nasri, Benzema, and Jérémy Menez contributed to the team winning the competition. Ben Arfa appeared in all five matches and scored goals against Northern Ireland, Turkey and Portugal. In total with the under-17s, he made 17 appearances and scored a team-high 11 goals. Because of his increased playing time with Lyon, Ben Arfa missed a significant portion of playing time with the under-18 team. He made his debut on 15 March 2005, playing in a 3–3 draw with Germany. Ben Arfa appeared in the final three matches of the season for the team to bring his appearance total to four. He scored no goals.

The foursome of Ben Arfa, Nasri, Benzema, and Menez returned to international play together for under-19 duty. The four were joined by Issiar Dia, Blaise Matuidi, and Serge Gakpé with the objective of winning the 2006 UEFA European Under-19 Football Championship. In the first round of qualification for the tournament, Ben Arfa scored his lone goal in the opening match against Wales as France advanced through the round undefeated. Due to injury, Ben Arfa was absent from the final round of qualification for the tournament and, despite going undefeated in the round, France were eliminated after being beaten on points by Scotland. Ben Arfa made only one competitive appearance with the under-21 team, appearing in a 2009 UEFA Under-21 Championship qualification match against Romania.

=== Senior ===
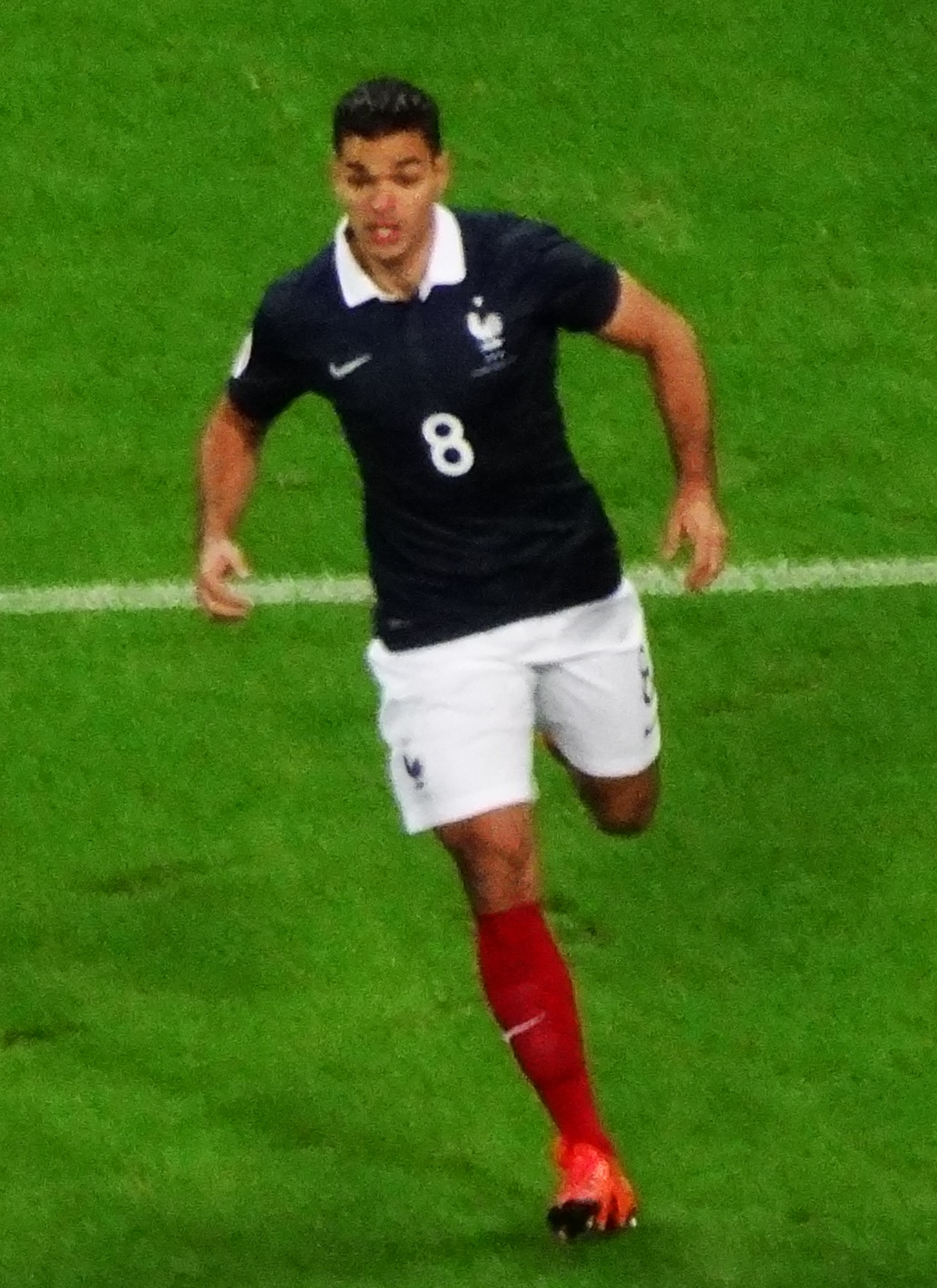
Ben Arfa playing for France in 2015

Before representing France, Ben Arfa was eligible to represent Tunisia and was offered a place in the 2006 World Cup, held in Germany. Like Sami Khedira he turned down the opportunity, preferring to continue his career with the France national team. Ben Arfa was called up to the senior team for the first time on 10 October 2007 by Raymond Domenech to replace the injured Louis Saha and played in the Euro 2008 qualifying matches against the Faroe Islands and Lithuania. This move stunned critics of Domenech as they expected striker David Trezeguet to get the call-up. Ben Arfa made his debut on 13 October when he came on for Franck Ribéry in the 64th minute and scored the last goal in France's 6–0 victory over the Faroe Islands. Ben Arfa was, however, omitted from Domenech's final 23-man Euro 2008 squad on 28 May.

On 25 February 2010, after a long period without a call-up, Ben Arfa returned to the team, alongside teammates Steve Mandanda and Benoît Cheyrou, after being called up for France's friendly match with Spain on 3 March. On 11 May, he was named to the 30-man preliminary list by Domenech to play in the 2010 World Cup, but failed to make the final 23.

After going nearly two years without representing France internationally, on 5 August 2010, Ben Arfa was called up to the senior team by new manager Laurent Blanc for the team's friendly match against Norway on 11 August 2010. Ben Arfa made his return to the team in the match appearing as a half-time substitute for Moussa Sissoko. He scored the opening goal of the match in a 2–1 defeat. On 29 May 2012 Ben Arfa was included in France's 23-man squad for UEFA Euro 2012, making his first start in the final game of Group D, losing 2–0 to Sweden.

On 12 May 2016, Ben Arfa was named on the standby list for France's UEFA Euro 2016 squad.

== Personal life ==
Ben Arfa was born in the Paris suburb of Clamart and was raised in Châtenay-Malabry. His father, Kamel Ben Arfa, a former Tunisian international footballer, arrived in France in 1973, settling in Saint-Michel, Aisne to work in a foundry. He later starred for a local club in the commune. Ben Arfa describes himself as a moderately practising Muslim.

== Career statistics ==
=== Club ===
Appearances and goals by club, season and competition
Club	Season	League			National cup		League cup		Europe		Other		Total	
Club	Season	Division	Apps	Goals	Apps	Goals	Apps	Goals	Apps	Goals	Apps	Goals	Apps	Goals
Lyon	2004–05	Ligue 1	9	0	0	0	1	1	4	0	0	0	14	1
Lyon	2005–06	Ligue 1	12	0	2	1	0	0	1	0	1	1	16	2
Lyon	2006–07	Ligue 1	13	1	3	0	1	0	1	0	1	0	19	1
Lyon	2007–08	Ligue 1	30	6	3	0	1	0	8	2	1	0	43	8
Lyon	Total		64	7	8	1	3	1	14	2	3	1	92	12
Marseille	2008–09	Ligue 1	33	6	1	0	1	0	13	2	—		48	8
Marseille	2009–10	Ligue 1	29	3	1	1	4	0	7	3	—		41	7
Marseille	2010–11	Ligue 1	1	0	0	0	0	0	0	0	1	0	2	0
Marseille	Total		63	9	2	1	5	0	20	5	1	0	91	15
Newcastle United (loan)	2010–11	Premier League	4	1	0	0	0	0	—		—		4	1
Newcastle United	2011–12	Premier League	26	5	2	1	2	0	—		—		30	6
Newcastle United	2012–13	Premier League	19	4	0	0	0	0	3	0	—		22	4
Newcastle United	2013–14	Premier League	27	3	1	0	2	0	—		—		30	3
Newcastle United	Total		76	13	3	1	4	0	3	0	—		86	14
Hull City (loan)	2014–15	Premier League	8	0	0	0	1	0	—		—		9	0
Nice	2015–16	Ligue 1	34	17	1	1	2	0	—		—		37	18
Paris Saint-Germain	2016–17	Ligue 1	23	0	3	3	2	0	3	0	1	1	32	4
Paris Saint-Germain	2017–18	Ligue 1	0	0	0	0	0	0	0	0	0	0	0	0
Paris Saint-Germain	Total		23	0	3	3	2	0	3	0	1	1	32	4
Rennes	2018–19	Ligue 1	26	7	4	0	2	0	9	2	0	0	41	9
Real Valladolid	2019–20	La Liga	5	0	0	0	—		—		—		5	0
Bordeaux	2020–21	Ligue 1	24	2	1	0	—		—		—		25	2
Lille	2021–22	Ligue 1	7	0	—		—		2	0	—		9	0
Career total			330	55	22	7	19	1	51	9	5	2	427	74

=== International ===
Appearances and goals by national team and year
National team	Year	Apps	Goals
France	2007	4	1
France	2008	3	0
France	2009	–	
France	2010	1	1
France	2011	–	
France	2012	5	0
France	2013	–	
France	2014	–	
France	2015	2	0
Total		15	2

Scores and results list France's goal tally first.

List of international goals scored by Hatem Ben Arfa
No.	Date	Venue	Opponent	Score	Result	Competition	Ref.
1	13 October 2007	Tórsvøllur, Tórshavn, Faroe Islands	Faroe Islands	6–0	6–0	UEFA Euro 2008 qualifying	
2	11 August 2010	Ullevaal Stadion, Oslo, Norway	Norway	1–0	1–2	Friendly	

== Honours ==
Lyon

- Ligue 1: 2004–05, 2005–06, 2006–07, 2007–08
- Coupe de France: 2007–08
- Trophée des Champions: 2005, 2006, 2007

Marseille

- Ligue 1: 2009–10
- Coupe de la Ligue: 2009–10
- Trophée des Champions: 2010

Paris Saint-Germain

- Coupe de France: 2016–17
- Coupe de la Ligue: 2016–17
- Trophée des Champions: 2016

Rennes

- Coupe de France: 2018–19

France U17

- UEFA European Under-17 Championship: 2004

Individual

- UNFP Ligue 1 Young Player of the Year: 2007–08
- UNFP Ligue 1 Player of the Month: February 2010
- UNFP Ligue 1 Team of the Year: 2015–16

== See also ==
- Zahia Affair
