= Lucho González =

Argentine footballer

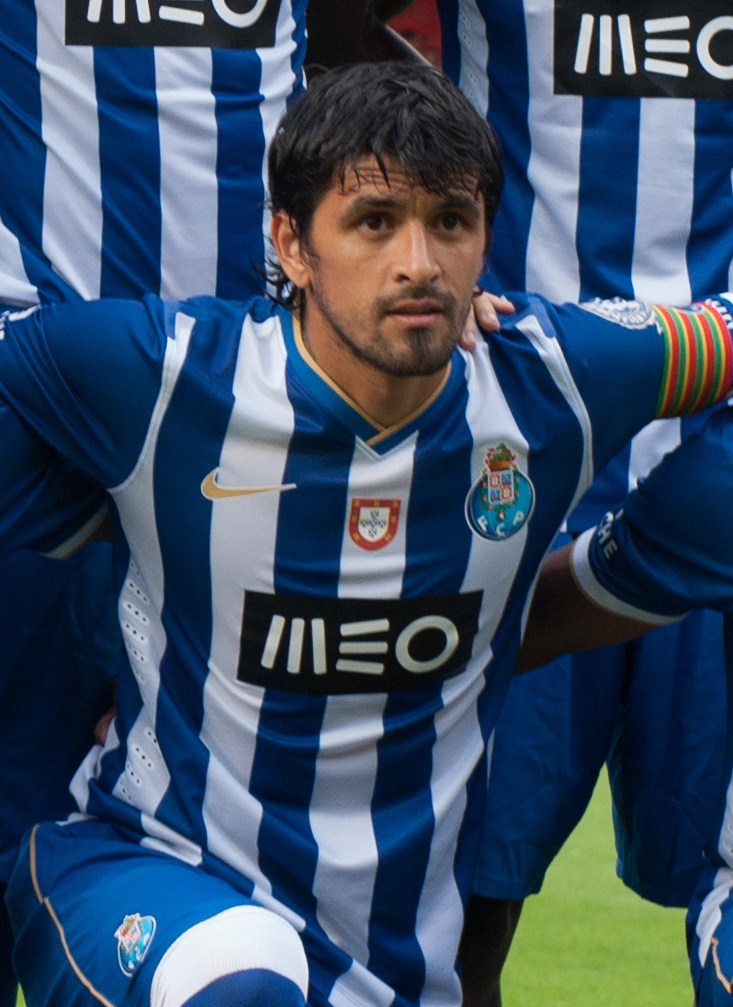
- González with Porto in 2013

Personal information
- Full name: Luis Óscar González
- Date of birth: 19 January 1981 (age 45)
- Place of birth: Buenos Aires, Argentina
- Height: 1.85 m (6 ft 1 in)
- Position: Midfielder

Team information
- Current team: Porto (assistant)

Youth career
- 1995–1998: Huracán

Senior career*
Years	Team	Apps	(Gls)
1998–2002	Huracán	111	(12)
2002–2005	River Plate	82	(17)
2005–2009	Porto	111	(31)
2009–2012	Marseille	87	(15)
2012–2014	Porto	57	(8)
2014–2015	Al-Rayyan	26	(8)
2015–2016	River Plate	17	(1)
2016–2021	Athletico Paranaense	103	(4)
Total		594	(96)

International career
2004	Argentina U23	12	(4)
2003–2011	Argentina	45	(6)

Managerial career
- 2022: Athletico Paranaense (assistant)
- 2022: Ceará
- 2023–2024: Internacional (assistant)
- 2024: Athletico Paranaense
- 2025–: Porto (assistant)
Medal record
Men's football
Representing Argentina
Olympic Games
Gold medal – first place	2004 Athens	Team
Copa América
Runner-up	2004 Peru
Runner-up	2007 Venezuela
- * Club domestic league appearances and goals

Luis Óscar "Lucho" González (Spanish pronunciation: [ˈlutʃo ɣonˈsales]; born 19 January 1981) is an Argentine former professional footballer, currently assistant manager of Primeira Liga club Porto. A versatile midfielder who was able to play in different positions but mainly in the centre, he was well known for his fierce shot, passing and work rate, being affectionately known as El Comandante (the commander) due to his leadership skills.

After starting with Huracán and River Plate, he signed for Porto in 2005, where he played 241 games and scored 61 goals across two spells, winning ten major titles. He also played in France with Marseille, Al-Rayyan in Qatar and Athletico Paranaense in Brazil; his 29 honours were surpassed only by Lionel Messi among his countrymen.

An Argentina international on 45 occasions, González represented his country in the 2006 World Cup and two Copa América tournaments.

== Club career ==
=== Early years ===
González was born in Buenos Aires to a mother from Chile and a father from Uruguay. He began his career at Huracán at the age of 14, making his Primera División debut on 29 April 1999 in a 1–2 home loss against Racing Club.

Three years later, González transferred to another side in his hometown, River Plate, where he won consecutive Clausura tournaments in 2003 and 2004, contributing 23 goals in 120 games across all competitions.

=== Porto ===
González's performances at River earned him a deal with Portugal's Porto in 2005, signing a five-year contract. In his first season he scored ten goals in 30 matches, including braces against Académica de Coimbra (5–1), Penafiel (3–1) and Vitória de Guimarães (3–1), helping the northerners to the first of their four consecutive Primeira Liga titles.

González eventually became team captain at Porto. In November 2006, he agreed to an improved five-year deal and, in August of the following year, the club paid €6.65 million to Global Soccer Agencies (later renamed Rio Football Services) to achieve full ownership of the player, activating the clause by rejecting an offer from Everton.

On 22 March 2009, González netted against Estrela da Amadora in the first leg of the semi-finals of the Taça de Portugal (2–0 home win, 3–2 on aggregate). During the league campaign, he scored nine times in only 23 appearances to help the team to the fourth title in a row; the season ended with a double.

=== Marseille ===
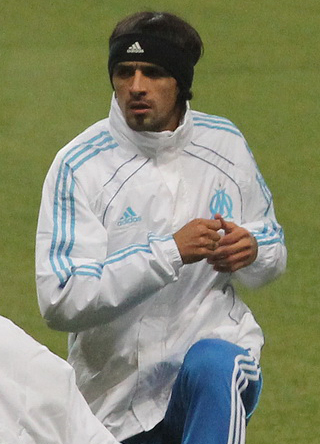
González warming up for Marseille in 2010

In June 2009, González was sold to Marseille in France for a fee of €18 million, with the possibility of an increase to €24 million depending on the player's performance; the four-year transfer was the most expensive in the club's history. He scored his first official goal for his new side on 19 September, opening a 4–2 home victory over Montpellier, and also found the net on 26 November in the 1–1 draw with AC Milan in the group stage of the UEFA Champions League, at the San Siro. He scored against Real Madrid in an ensuing fixture on 8 December, but later missed a penalty kick in the 1–3 home loss, with the subsequent relegation to the UEFA Europa League.

After the winter break, González also helped Marseille to reach the final of the Coupe de la Ligue, scoring against Lille in the quarter-finals (2–1) in late January. He finished his first season with 32 matches and five goals, winning a league/league cup double.

González scored his first goal of the 2010–11 campaign on 29 August 2010, in a 1–1 draw at Bordeaux. On 3 November, he grabbed a brace in the 7–0 away rout of Žilina in the Champions League group phase.

González started in the 2011 Coupe de la Ligue final, won 1–0 against Montpellier. He was linked with a transfer to England's Arsenal in early May 2011 because of his solid performances, to which he responded that "I don't know why there are so many things said about this at the moment. It annoys me a bit. At no time has it left my mouth that I wanted to leave or that I didn't feel good here. I have a contract with OM until 2013 and the people at the club seem happy with me." On 8 May, Marseille faced title challengers Lyon at the Stade de Gerland, and he scored in an eventual 3–2 defeat, with his team eventually finishing second to Lille. After the season ended, chairman Jean-Claude Dassier confirmed that he was seeking an exit from the club.

Despite the constant speculation, González remained at the Stade Vélodrome for 2011–12. On the first fixture, he opened the score in the 38th minute of a 2–2 home draw against Sochaux. On 13 September, he netted the game's only goal at Olympiacos in the Champions League group stage, where he also earned Player of the match accolades.

=== Return to Porto ===
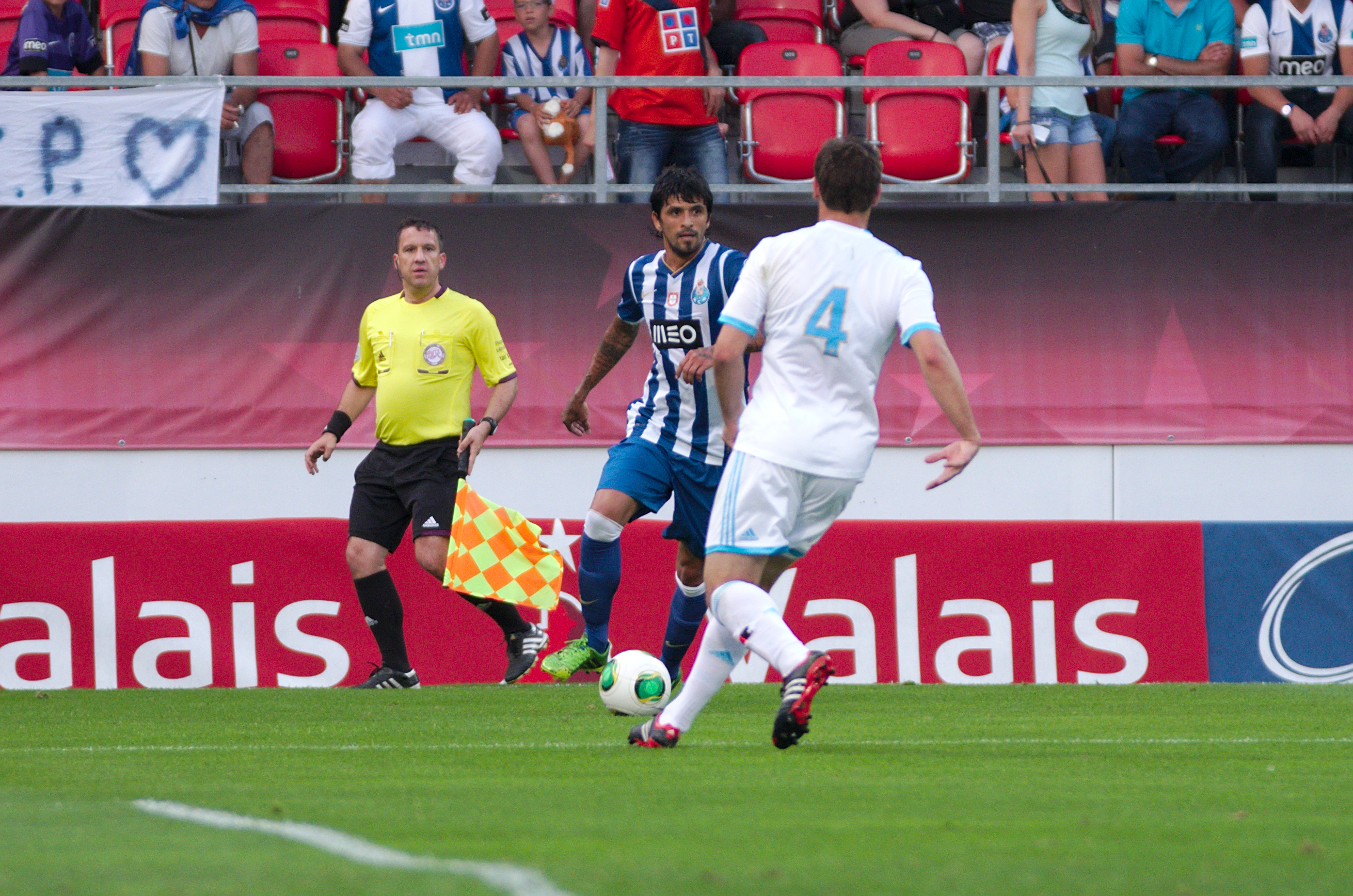
González (in stripes) playing for Porto against Marseille in 2013

On 30 January 2012, after 124 competitive appearances for Marseille, González returned to Porto, signing until June 2014. He scored in his first match in his second spell, a 2–0 win against Vitória de Setúbal in the Taça da Liga on 5 February. He opened a 2–0 home victory over Olhanense on 31 March, his first league goal since returning.

In 2012–13, Porto won a third consecutive league title after an unbeaten season with González as captain; he opened a decisive 2–0 win at Paços de Ferreira on the final day. In the Champions League, he netted in away and home group wins over Dinamo Zagreb with the former coming on the day of his father's death; the goals gave him the record figure of 16 in that phase of the competition, while he never scored any later on. He added two more the following season, as the Dragons came third at that stage and fell into the Europa League.

=== Later career ===
On 27 January 2014, González signed with Qatari club Al-Rayyan, initially until June. Eighteen months later, he returned to his country's league and River Plate for the first time in a decade, signing until 2017. He played as a substitute in their Copa Libertadores finals win over Tigres and the victory against Gamba Osaka in the 2015 Suruga Bank Championship in his first year back.

At the age of 35 on 16 September 2016, González joined Brazil's Athletico Paranaense. He played 160 times and scored ten goals for the side, winning five trophies including the Copa Sudamericana in 2018.

González announced his retirement on 27 May 2021, at the age of 40.

== International career ==
Under the guidance of Marcelo Bielsa, González earned his first cap for the Argentina national team on 31 January 2003 against Honduras. He went on to represent the nation in the 2004 Copa América, scoring two goals during the tournament as the country lost the final on penalties to Brazil.

González also played with the side that won the gold medal at the 2004 Summer Olympics. In 2006, he was selected for the 2006 FIFA World Cup in which Argentina, managed by José Pekerman, lost to hosts Germany in the quarter-finals on penalties.

Subsequently, González was part of the Alfio Basile–led squad at 2007 Copa América, where the Albiceleste was again defeated by Brazil in the decisive match, now 3–0.

== Coaching career ==
González returned to his final club Athletico in January 2022, as assistant to manager Alberto Valentim. In April, he was named as the latter's interim replacement, but chose to leave within 24 hours.

On 24 August 2022, González signed his first coaching contract for fellow Campeonato Brasileiro Série A team Ceará, until the end of the season. He drew 1–1 at Flamengo on his debut on 4 September, and was dismissed on 28 October after only one win in ten matches.

González joined Internacional in July 2023 as assistant to manager Eduardo Coudet, taking part in their run to the Copa Libertadores semi-finals and climbing up the Brazilian League standings. In December, the entire staff was renewed until December 2024.

González departed following Coudet's dismissal in July 2024, and returned to Athletico Paranaense on 24 September, now as head coach. He was himself sacked on 10 December, after suffering relegation in the year of the club's 100th birthday.

In July 2025, González returned to Porto, as part of newly appointed Francesco Farioli's staff.

== Career statistics ==
=== Club ===
Appearances and goals by club, season and competition
Club	Season	League			National cup (Note: Includes Taça de Portugal, Coupe de France, Emir of Qatar Cup and Copa do Brasil)		League cup (Note: Includes Taça da Liga and Coupe de la Ligue)		Continental		Other		Total	
Club	Season	Division	Apps	Goals	Apps	Goals	Apps	Goals	Apps	Goals	Apps	Goals	Apps	Goals
Huracán	1998–99	Primera División	7	0	—		—		—		—		7	0
Huracán	1999–2000	Primera B Nacional	35	5	—		—		—		—		35	5
Huracán	2000–01	Primera División	34	3	—		—		—		—		34	3
Huracán	2001–02	Primera División	35	4	—		—		—		—		35	4
Huracán	Total		111	12	—		—		—		—		111	12
River Plate	2002–03	Primera División	32	7	—		—		10 (Note: One appearance in Copa Sudamericana, nine appearances and one goal in Copa Libertadores)	1	—		42	8
River Plate	2003–04	Primera División	24	2	—		—		17 (Note: Seven appearances in Copa Sudamericana, ten appearances and three goals in Copa Libertadores)	3	—		41	5
River Plate	2004–05	Primera División	26	8	—		—		11 (Note: Appearances in Copa Libertadores)	1	—		37	9
River Plate	Total		82	17	—		—		38	5	—		120	22
Porto	2005–06	Primeira Liga	30	10	4	1	—		6 (Note: Appearances in UEFA Champions League)	1	—		40	12
Porto	2006–07	Primeira Liga	30	9	0	0	—		8	3	0	0	38	12
Porto	2007–08	Primeira Liga	28	3	5	2	0	0	7	3	0	0	40	8
Porto	2008–09	Primeira Liga	23	9	3	1	1	0	9	2	1 (Note: Appearance in Supertaça Cândido de Oliveira)	0	37	12
Porto	Total		111	31	12	4	1	0	30	9	1	0	155	44
Marseille	2009–10	Ligue 1	32	5	0	0	4	1	8 (Note: Five appearances and two goals in UEFA Champions League, three appearances in UEFA Europa League)	2	—		44	8
Marseille	2010–11	Ligue 1	36	8	1	0	4	0	8	2	1 (Note: Appearance in Trophée des Champions)	0	50	10
Marseille	2011–12	Ligue 1	19	2	2	0	2	0	6	1	1	0	30	3
Marseille	Total		87	15	3	0	10	1	22	5	2	0	124	21
Porto	2011–12	Primeira Liga	12	1	0	0	2	2	2 (Note: Appearances in UEFA Europa League)	0	0	0	16	3
Porto	2012–13	Primeira Liga	29	6	2	1	4	1	8	2	1	0	44	10
Porto	2013–14	Primeira Liga	16	1	2	0	1	0	6	2	1	1	26	4
Porto	Total		57	8	4	1	7	3	16	4	2	1	86	17
Al-Rayyan	2013–14	Qatar Stars League	10	1	0	0	—		4 (Note: Appearances in AFC Champions League)	1	—		14	2
Al-Rayyan	2014–15	Qatari Second Division	15	6	4	0	—		7 (Note: Appearances in GCC Champions League)	0	—		26	6
Al-Rayyan	Total		26	8	4	0	—		11	1	—		41	9
River Plate	2015	Primera División	9	1	0	0	—		8 (Note: Four appearances in Copa Libertadores, four appearances in Copa Sudamericana)	0	3 (Note: Two appearances in FIFA Club World Cup, one appearance in J.League Cup / Copa Sudamericana Championship)	0	20	1
River Plate	2016	Primera División	8	0	0	0	—		3	1	–		11	1
River Plate	Total		17	1	0	0	—		11	1	3	0	31	2
Athletico Paranaense	2016	Série A	12	0	—		—		—		—		12	0
Athletico Paranaense	2017	Série A	26	2	3	1	—		12	3	5 (Note: Appearances in Campeonato Paranaense)	0	46	6
Athletico Paranaense	2018	Série A	27	1	6	0	—		12 (Note: Appearances in Copa Sudamericana)	0	0	0	45	1
Athletico Paranaense	2019	Série A	17	1	7	0	—		4	0	3 (Note: Two appearances in Recopa Sudamericana, one appearance in J.League Cup / Copa Sudamericana Championship)	0	31	1
Athletico Paranaense	2020	Série A	12	0	2	0	—		6	2	4	0	24	2
Athletico Paranaense	2021	Série A	—		—		—		2	0	0	0	2	0
Athletico Paranaense	Total		94	4	18	1	—		36	5	12	0	160	10
Career total			584	95	41	6	18	4	164	30	20	1	827	136

=== International ===
No.	Date	Venue	Opponent	Score	Result	Competition	Ref.
1	31 January 2003	Olímpico Metropolitano, San Pedro Sula, Honduras	Honduras	1–2	1–3	Friendly	
2	8 February 2003	Orange Bowl, Miami, United States	United States	0–1	0–1	Friendly	
3	7 July 2004	Elías Aguirre, Chiclayo, Peru	Ecuador	6–1	6–1	2004 Copa América	
4	20 July 2004	Estadio Nacional, Lima, Peru	Colombia	2–0	3–0	2004 Copa América	
5	9 October 2004	Estadio Monumental, Buenos Aires, Argentina	Uruguay	1–0	4–2	2006 World Cup qualification	
6	1 April 2009	Hernando Siles, La Paz, Bolivia	Bolivia	1–6	1–6	2010 World Cup qualification	

== Managerial statistics ==
As of match played 8 December 2024

Coaching record by team and tenure
Team	Nat	From	To	Record							
Team	Nat	From	To	G	W	D	L	GF	GA	GD	Win %
Ceará	(Brazil)	24 August 2022	28 October 2022	10	1	4	5	7	12	−5	10.00
Athletico Paranaense	(Brazil)	24 September 2024	10 December 2024	14	3	2	9	14	21	−7	21.43
Total				24	4	6	14	21	32	−11	16.67

== Honours ==
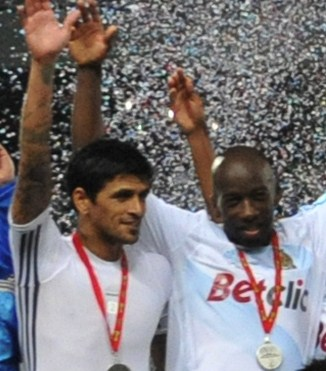
González after winning the 2011 Trophée des Champions

Huracán

- Primera B Nacional: 2000

River Plate

- Argentine Primera División: Clausura 2003, Clausura 2004
- Copa Libertadores: 2015
- Suruga Bank Championship: 2015
- FIFA Club World Cup runner-up: 2015

Porto

- Primeira Liga: 2005–06, 2006–07, 2007–08, 2008–09, 2011–12, 2012–13
- Taça de Portugal: 2005–06, 2008–09
- Supertaça Cândido de Oliveira: 2012, 2013

Marseille

- Ligue 1: 2009–10
- Coupe de la Ligue: 2009–10, 2010–11, 2011–12
- Trophée des Champions: 2010, 2011

Al-Rayyan

- Qatari Second Division: 2014–15

Athletico Paranaense

- Copa do Brasil: 2019
- Copa Sudamericana: 2018, 2021
- J.League Cup / Copa Sudamericana Championship: 2019
- Campeonato Paranaense: 2020

Argentina Olympic

- Summer Olympic Games: 2004
- CONMEBOL Pre-Olympic Tournament: 2004

Argentina

- Copa América runner-up: 2004, 2007

Individual

- Copa América Team of the Tournament: 2004
- South American Team of the Year: 2004
- Portuguese Golden Ball: 2009
- SJPF Player of the Month: October 2007
- FC Porto Player of the Year: 2006
- UNFP Player of the Month: April 2010
