= 2010 Trophée des Champions =

Marseille	Paris Saint-Germain
Ligue 1	Ligue 1
0	0
- Marseille won 5–4 on penalties
- Date: 28 July 2010
- Venue: Stade Olympique de Radès, Tunis, Tunisia
- Man of the Match: Steve Mandanda
- Referee: Aouaz Trabelsi (Tunisia)
- Attendance: 57,000
- Weather: 25 °C (77 °F), Clear

The 2010 Trophée des champions (English: 2010 Champions Trophy) was the 15th edition of the French super cup. The match was contested by the winners of Ligue 1 the previous season, Marseille, and the winners of the Coupe de France the previous season, Paris Saint-Germain. The match was played, for the second consecutive season, on international soil at the Stade Olympique de Radès in Rades, Tunis, Tunisia. Like last year, the idea was to promote French football abroad, but this time more specifically in Africa and the Arab world. The match was televised live on M6 and throughout 53 countries in the world.

The match marked the 74th time Classique rivals Marseille and Paris Saint-Germain played against each other and was the second match, the first being the 2006 French Cup final, in the rivalry's history to not be contested at neither the Stade Vélodrome or the Parc des Princes. On 22 July 2010, the Ligue de Football Professionnel and the Tunisian Football Federation confirmed that international referee Aouaz Trabelsi will officiate the match. Trabelsi was assisted by Béchir Hassani and Yamen Malloulchi and the fourth official was Herzi Riadh.

The supercup was won by Marseille with the club defeating PSG 5–4 on penalties after the match finished 0–0 in regular time. The victory gives Marseille their first Trophée des champions title. The 2010 edition hosted a record attendance of 57,000 people.

== Preview ==
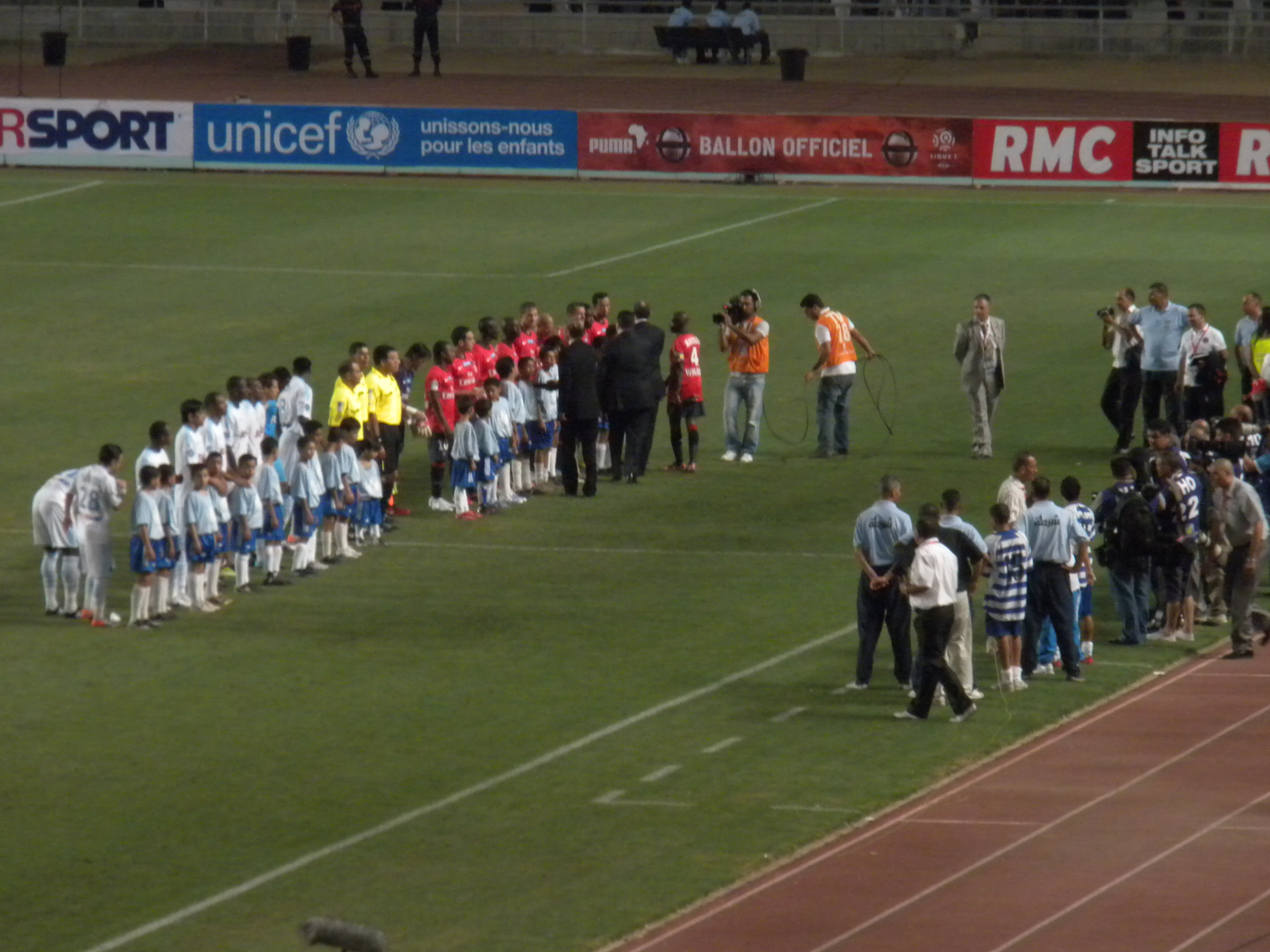
Olympique de Marseille and Paris Saint-Germain line-ups at the 2010 Trophée des Champions.

Defending Ligue 1 champions Marseille arrived in Tunisia with only one new recruit as of 28 July 2010: Spanish defender César Azpilicueta. Azpilicueta joined the club on 21 June after Marseille reached an agreement with his former club Osasuna on a deal valued at €7 million. Aside from Azpilicueta, Ghanaian and Malian internationals André Ayew and Mamadou Samassa returned to the team after loan stints at Arles-Avignon and Valenciennes, respectively. Other loanee returns included Jean-Philippe Sabo and Leyti N'Diaye who both return to the club after a season's stint at Ajaccio.

The Coupe de France champions Paris Saint-Germain arrived in Tunis with two new arrivals to the club: midfielders Mathieu Bodmer and Nenê. Bodmer joined the club on 30 June after a three-year stint at Lyon, while Nenê arrived at the club a week later after a successful individual 2009–10 season with Monaco. Also returning to the team will be former French international Claude Makélélé. Makélélé had previously stated that the 2009–10 season would be his final season as a professional football player, but in June 2010, retracted the statement and signed a new one-year deal with the club. Loris Arnaud returned to the team on 30 June following a six-month loan stint at Clermont. Midfielder Jérôme Rothen also returned to the team on the same date after spending the 2009–10 season on loan at Scottish club Rangers and Turkish club Ankaragücü.

== Match details ==
28 July 2010
19:45 CET

Marseille	0–0	Paris Saint-Germain
	Report
Penalties
Taiwo (penalty scored); Ben Arfa (penalty scored); González (penalty missed); Kaboré (penalty scored); Gnabouyou (penalty scored); Cissé (penalty scored)	5–4	(penalty missed) Luyindula; (penalty scored) Jallet; (penalty scored) Nenê; (penalty scored) Kežman; (penalty scored) Makélélé; (penalty missed) Giuly

Stade Olympique de Radès, Tunis
Attendance: 57,000
Referee: Aouaz Trabelsi (Tunisia)

OM	PSG

MARSEILLE:
GK	30	(France) Steve Mandanda
RB	2	(Spain) César Azpilicueta
CB	21	(Senegal) Souleymane Diawara		(substituted off) 44'
CB	5	(Brazil) Vitorino Hilton
LB	3	(Nigeria) Taye Taiwo (c)	(yellow card) 74'
DM	6	(France) Édouard Cissé
CM	12	(Burkina Faso) Charles Kaboré
CM	8	(Argentina) Lucho González
RW	28	(France) Mathieu Valbuena		(substituted off) 61'
LW	20	(Ghana) André Ayew	(yellow card) 29'	(substituted off) 85'
CF	24	(Mali) Mamadou Samassa
Substitutes:
GK	40	(Brazil) Elinton Andrade
DF	14	(Senegal) Leyti N'Diaye		(substituted on) 44'
DF	26	(France) Jean-Philippe Sabo
MF	7	(France) Benoît Cheyrou
MF	10	(France) Hatem Ben Arfa		(substituted on) 61'
MF	18	(France) Fabrice Abriel
FW	29	(France) Guy Gnabouyou		(substituted on) 85'
Manager:
(France) Didier Deschamps

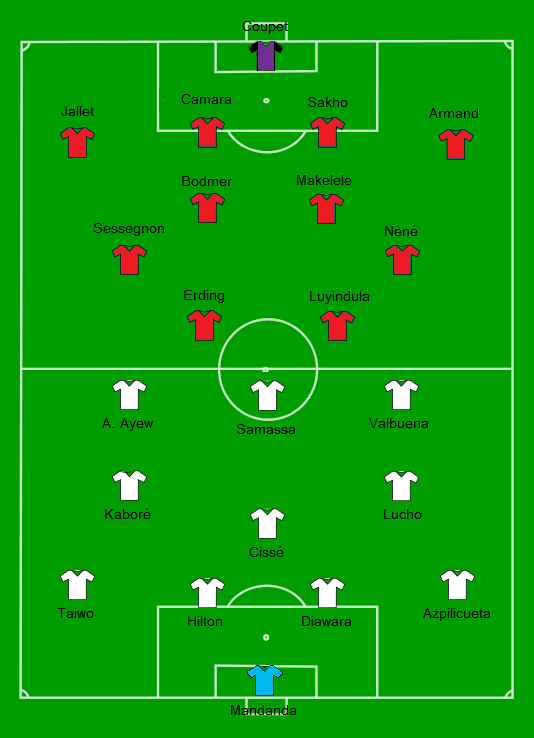

Paris SG:
GK	1	(France) Grégory Coupet
RB	26	(France) Christophe Jallet
CB	3	(France) Mamadou Sakho	(yellow card) 57'
CB	6	(France) Zoumana Camara
LB	22	(France) Sylvain Armand	(yellow card) 5'
CM	4	(France) Claude Makélélé (c)
CM	12	(France) Mathieu Bodmer		(substituted off) 76'
RW	10	(Benin) Stéphane Sessègnon		(substituted off) 65'
LW	19	(Brazil) Nenê
CF	11	(Turkey) Mevlüt Erdinç		(substituted off) 81'
CF	8	(France) Péguy Luyindula
Substitutes:
GK	30	(Armenia) Apoula Edel
DF	2	(Brazil) Ceará
MF	20	(France) Clément Chantôme
MF	23	(France) Jérémy Clément		(substituted on) 76'
FW	7	(France) Ludovic Giuly		(substituted on) 65'
FW	14	(Serbia) Mateja Kežman		(substituted on) 81'
FW	21	(France) Jean-Eudes Maurice
Manager:
(France) Antoine Kombouaré

MATCH OFFICIALS

- Assistant referees:
  - Béchir Hassani (Tunisia)
  - Yamen Malloulchi (Tunisia)
- Fourth official: Herzi Riadh (Tunisia)

MATCH RULES

- 90 minutes.
- Penalty shoot-out if scores level after 90 minutes.
- Seven named substitutes
- Maximum of six substitutions.

== See also ==
- 2010–11 Ligue 1
- 2010–11 Coupe de France
- 2010–11 Olympique de Marseille season
- 2010–11 Paris Saint-Germain FC season
