= Jean-Philippe Sabo =

French former professional footballer (born 1987)

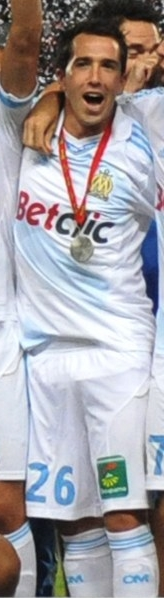
- Sabo with Marseille in 2011 celebrating the club's Trophée des Champions win

Personal information
- Date of birth: 26 February 1987 (age 39)
- Place of birth: Gouvieux, France
- Height: 1.74 m (5 ft 9 in)
- Position: Defender

Youth career
- 2002–2007: Marseille

Senior career*
Years	Team	Apps	(Gls)
2007–2012	Marseille	5	(0)
2008–2009	→ Montpellier (loan)	34	(2)
2009–2010	→ Ajaccio (loan)	34	(0)
2013–2016	Strasbourg	86	(6)
2015	Strasbourg B	1	(0)
Total		160	(8)
- * Club domestic league appearances and goals

Jean-Philippe Sabo (born 26 February 1987) is a French former professional footballer who played as a defender.

== Career ==
Born in Gouvieux, Sabo began his career with Marseille, making his debut during the 2007–08 season. Sabo spent the 2008–09 season on loan at Montpellier. In July 2009, Sabo agreed to spend the 2009–10 season on loan at Ajaccio. In the same month, Sabo's contract at l'OM was extended to June 2012. Sabo was released by Marseille in June 2012.

In September 2012 he underwent a trial at Nice, which was unsuccessful. In October 2012, Sabo undertook a trial with English club Nottingham Forest.

After leaving Strasbourg upon expiration of his contract in June 2016, Sabo joined lower league side AS Erstein in the 2016–17 season hoping to return to professional football.

== Honours ==
Marseille

- Coupe de la Ligue: 2010–11
- Trophée des Champions: 2010, 2011
