= Édouard Cissé =

French footballer (born 1978)

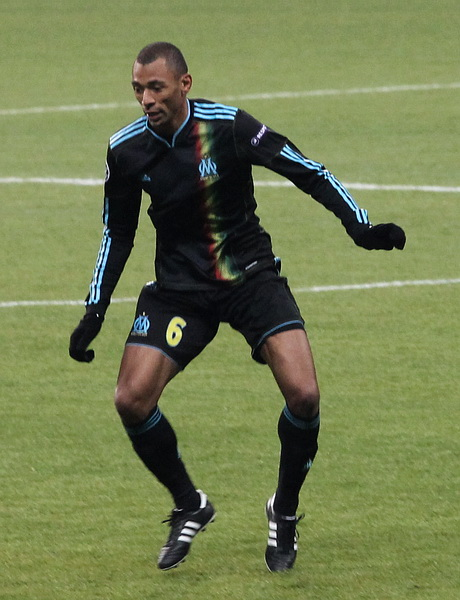
- Cissé with Marseille in 2010

Personal information
- Full name: Édouard Léopold Cissé
- Date of birth: 30 March 1978 (age 48)
- Place of birth: Pau, France
- Height: 1.86 m (6 ft 1 in)
- Position: Midfielder

Youth career
- 1986–1994: AS Billère
- 1994–1996: Pau

Senior career*
Years	Team	Apps	(Gls)
1996–1997	Pau FC	17	(0)
1997–2007	Paris Saint-Germain	186	(8)
1998–1999	→ Rennes (loan)	28	(2)
2002–2003	→ West Ham United (loan)	25	(1)
2003–2004	→ Monaco (loan)	31	(1)
2007–2009	Beşiktaş	54	(2)
2009–2011	Marseille	55	(1)
2011–2012	Auxerre	28	(2)
Total		424	(17)

International career
1997	France U-20	1	(0)
1998–1999	France U-21	14	(1)
- * Club domestic league appearances and goals

Édouard Léopold Cissé (born 30 March 1978) is a French former professional footballer who played as a midfielder.

== Early life ==
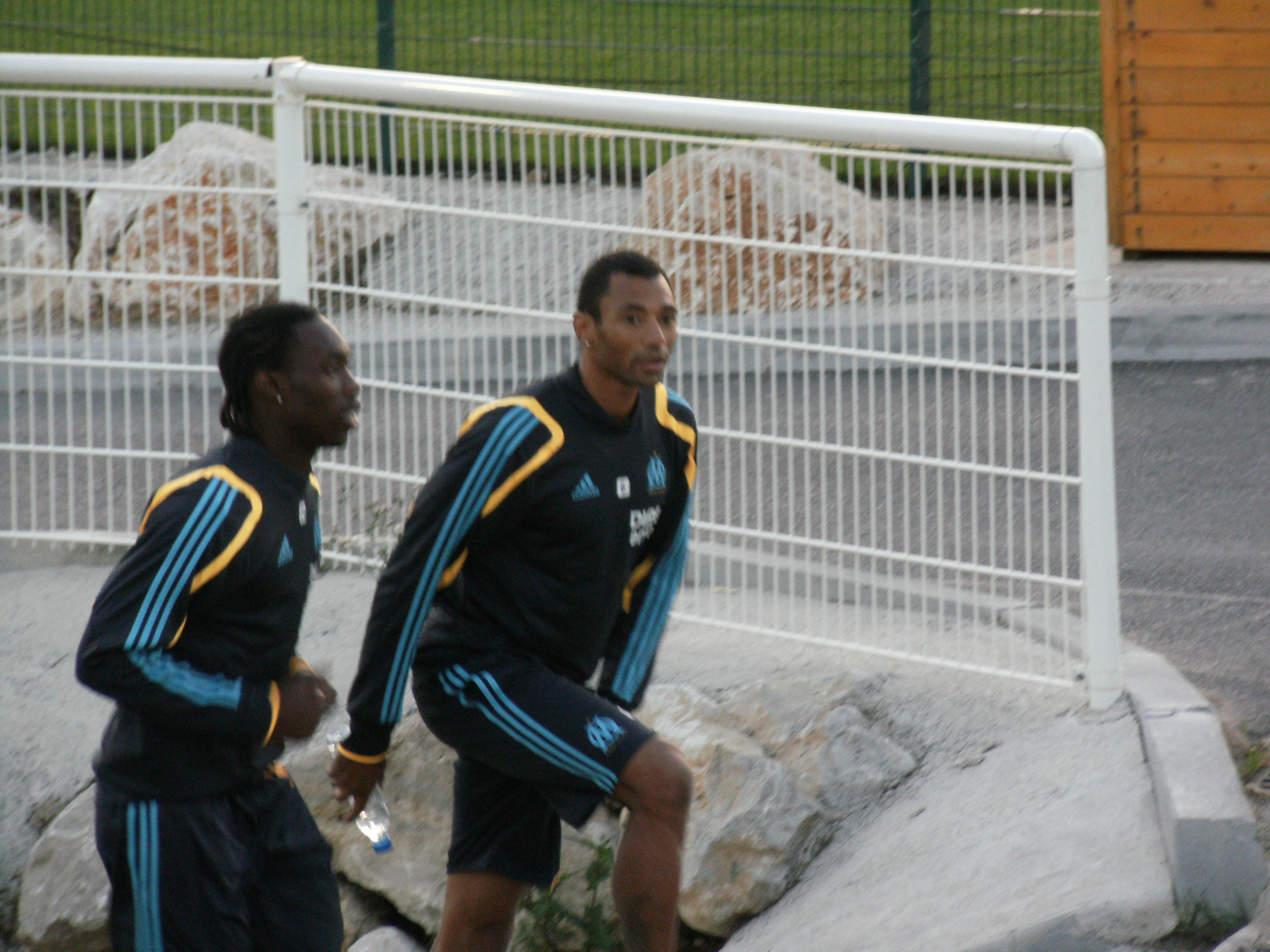
Cissé (right) with Guy Gnabouyou

Cissé was born in Pau, Pyrénées-Atlantiques in southwest France.

== Club career ==
Cissé made his breakthrough at his boyhood club Pau FC in 1997.

Cissé previously played for Monaco in France and West Ham United in the English Premiership (where he scored once against Charlton Athletic) and Paris Saint-Germain. On 28 June 2007, it was confirmed that Cissé had signed a two-year contract (with an option of a third) with Beşiktaş of Turkey for a fee of €1.5 million per annum. He played well with Fabian Ernst and left the club on 3 June 2009 to sign with Olympique de Marseille. On 18 August 2011, he joined Auxerre on a two-year contract. After two years at the club he left in 2013.

== International career ==
Cissé played for the France under-20 and under-21 teams. Having Senegalese ancestry, he became eligible to play for the Senegal national team in 2009 after a change in FIFA regulations. He was called up to friendly match against South Korea, but rejected the call saying that he would rather clarify some points, having not been called up again.

== Honours ==
Paris Saint-Germain

- Coupe de la Ligue: 1997–98
- UEFA Intertoto Cup: 2001
- Coupe de France: 2005–06

Monaco

- UEFA Champions League runner-up: 2003–04

Besiktas

- Süper Lig: 2008–09
- Turkish Cup: 2008–09

Marseille

- Ligue 1: 2009–10
- Coupe de la Ligue: 2009–10, 2010–11
- Trophée des Champions: 2010, 2011
