= Sénah Mango =

Togolese footballer (born 1991)

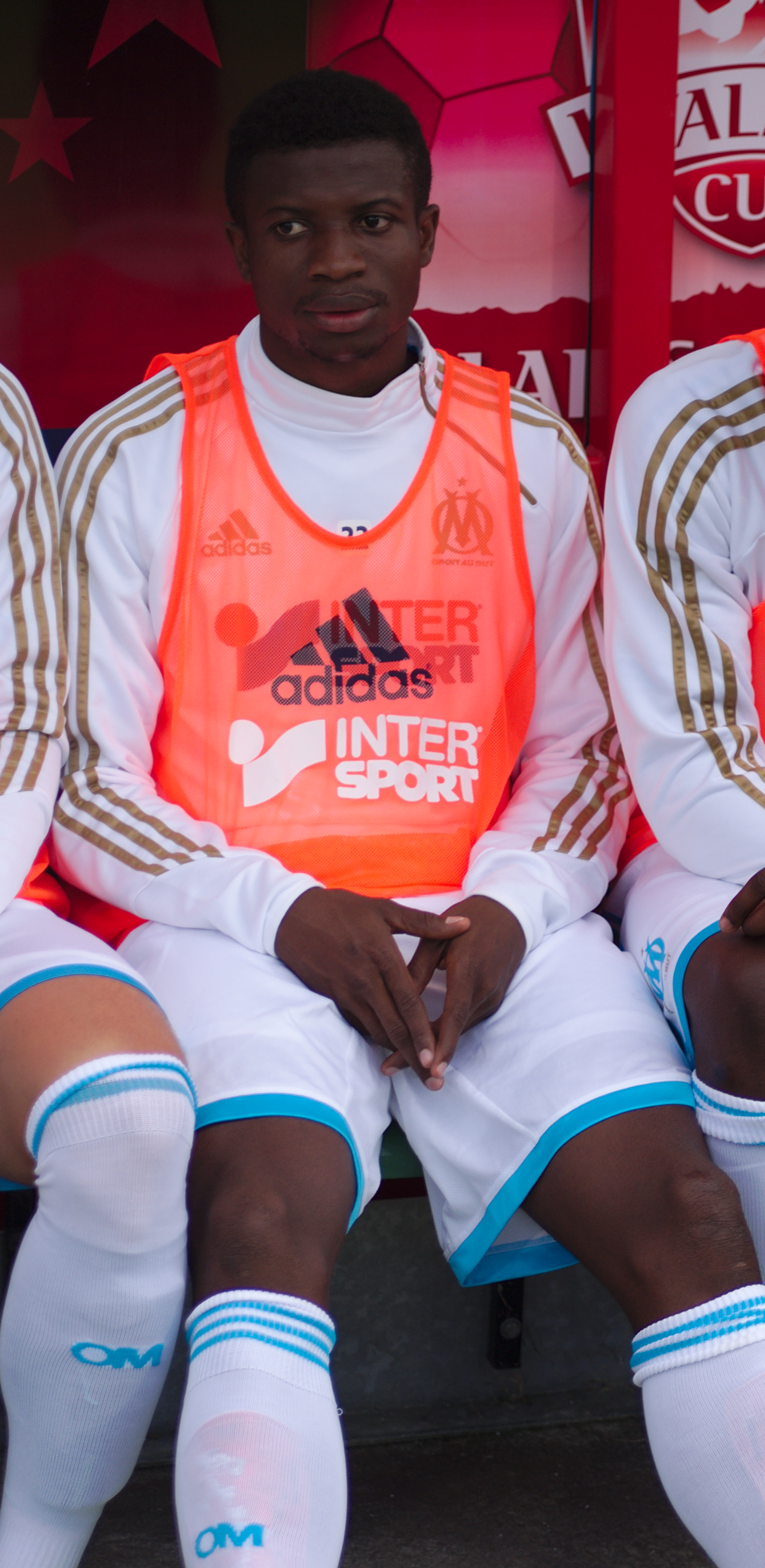

Personal information
- Full name: Sénah Mango
- Date of birth: 13 December 1991 (age 34)
- Place of birth: Lomé, Togo
- Height: 1.81 m (5 ft 11 in)
- Position: Centre back

Team information
- Current team: FC Coffrane
- Number: 44

Youth career
- 2004–2008: Marseille

Senior career*
Years	Team	Apps	(Gls)
2008–2010	Marseille II	31	(1)
2010–2014	Marseille	1	(0)
2011	→ Monaco II (loan)	9	(0)
2013	→ Uzès Pont du Gard (loan)	17	(0)
2013–2014	→ Luzenac (loan)	14	(0)
2015–2017	Boulogne II	22	(2)
2015–2017	Boulogne	26	(1)
2017–2018	El Ejido	17	(0)
2018–2019	Don Benito	8	(0)
2019	Sant Julià	2	(0)
2021–2022	UE Santa Coloma	6	(0)
2022–	Coffrane	50	(2)

International career
2009–2012	Togo	11	(1)
- * Club domestic league appearances and goals as of 14 October 2023

Sénah Mango (born December 13, 1991) is a Togolese footballer who plays as a central defender for FC Coffrane in the Swiss 1. Liga.

== Career ==
Sènah began his career in his youth with Olympique Marseille and was a part of the 2008 U-16 French League winning side. He was promoted to the Marseille reserve team at the age of 17 and played his first reserve team game in September 2007.

Sènah spent the 2011/2012 season on loan at Ligue 2 club AS Monaco. The loan deal included an option to buy. He saw first-team action while on loan at Uzès Pont du Gard in 2013.

He spent the 2013–14 season at French third-division club Luzenac, where he played a part in the team's eventual promotion to Ligue 2 at the end of the season, though the club was unable to compete in Ligue 2 for financial reasons. His contract with Marseille expired at the end of the 2014 season and he became an unattached free agent.

Sénah signed with Boulogne for the 2014/15 season. In July 2017 he joined El Ejido. He played there for one season, before joining CD Don Benito. Seven months later, on 31 January 2019, he left the club by mutual consent.

== International ==
Mango played his first international game on 10 September 2008 against Zambia national football team and scored his first goal on 11 February 2009 against Burkina Faso national football team.

== Honours ==
- 2007 : Champions de France des – de 16 (OM)
