= Antonio Pintus =

Italian fitness coach

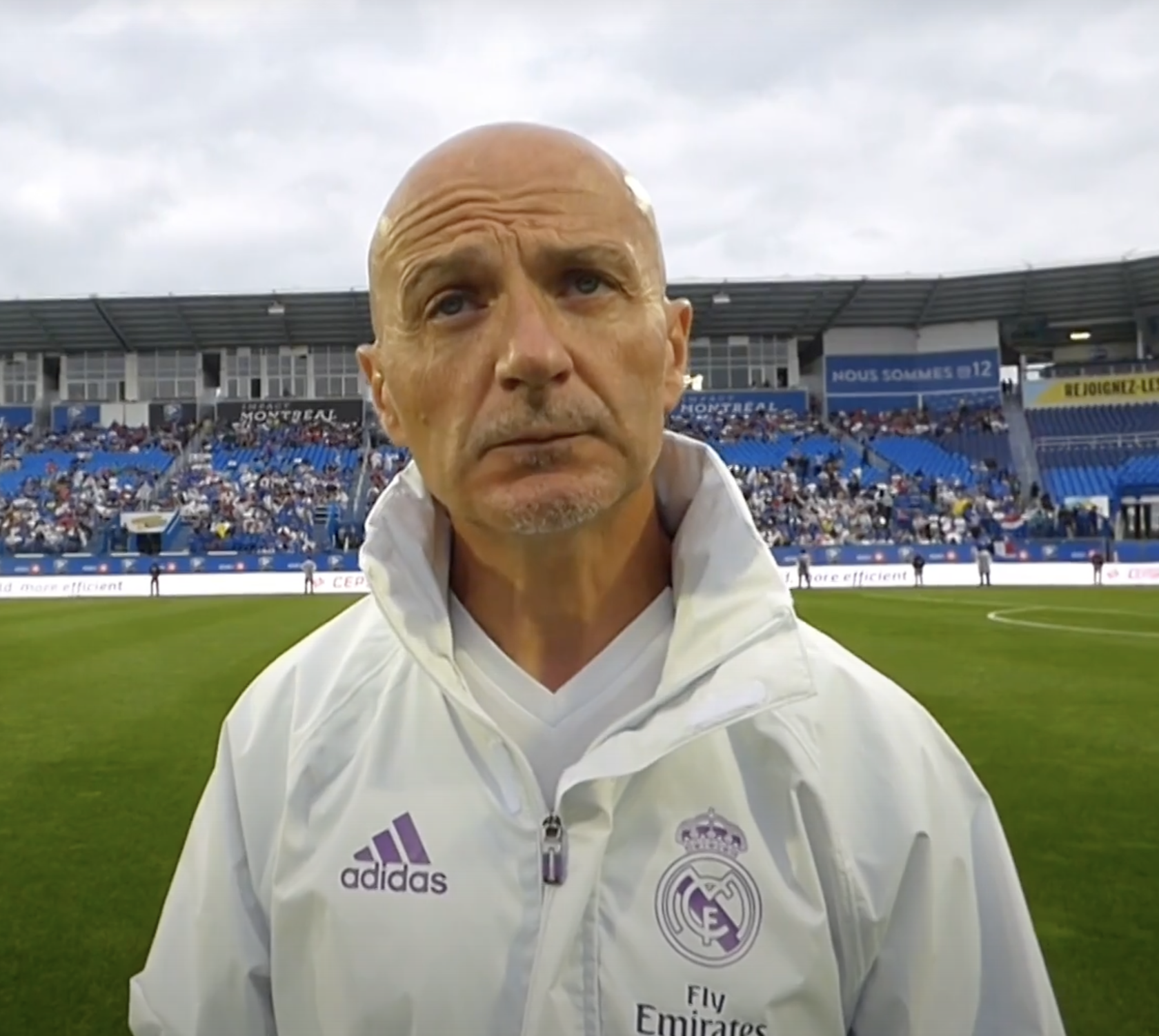
- Pintus with Real Madrid in 2016

Personal information
- Date of birth: 26 September 1962 (age 64)
- Place of birth: Turin, Italy

Team information
- Current team: Real Madrid (conditioning coach)

Managerial career
- Years: Team
- 1986–1991: Settimo (conditioning coach)
- 1991–1998: Juventus (conditioning coach)
- 1998–2000: Chelsea (conditioning coach)
- 2001: Udinese (conditioning coach)
- 2001–2005: Monaco (conditioning coach)
- 2006–2007: Juventus (conditioning coach)
- 2008–2010: West Ham United (conditioning coach)
- 2010–2011: Marseille (conditioning coach)
- 2011–2012: Marseille Consolat (conditioning coach)
- 2012–2013: Palermo (conditioning coach)
- 2013–2015: Sunderland (conditioning coach)
- 2016–2019: Real Madrid (conditioning coach)
- 2019–2021: Inter Milan (conditioning coach)
- 2021–2025: Real Madrid (conditioning coach)
- 2025–: Real Madrid (performance manager)

Antonio Pintus (born 26 September 1962) is an Italian fitness coach, currently working as a conditioning coach for Real Madrid.

== Career ==
Pintus has previously worked for Chelsea, West Ham and Sunderland in England, Monaco, Marseille and Consolat Marseille in France, and for Udinese, Juventus, Palermo and Inter Milan in Italy. He started his conditioning coach career in 1986, and has worked with multiple title and cup winning managers, including Giovanni Trapattoni, Marcello Lippi, Gianluca Vialli, Didier Deschamps, Gian Piero Gasperini, Rafael Benítez, Zinedine Zidane, Antonio Conte, José Mourinho, and Carlo Ancelotti.

Pintus has visited the NASA space agency several times, giving talks about how his methods could be applied to their work and how astronauts can keep fit on missions. Judith Hayes, NASA's chief science officer, stated that Pintus data-based approach to physical fitness challenged their status quo, saying that "Our scientists, exercise physiologists, astronauts, physicians, trainers, and engineers hung on every word that he had to share with us. He was able to challenge our people and our thinking. It made us think about different ways to look at things."
