= Guy Gnabouyou =

French-Ivorian footballer (born 1989)

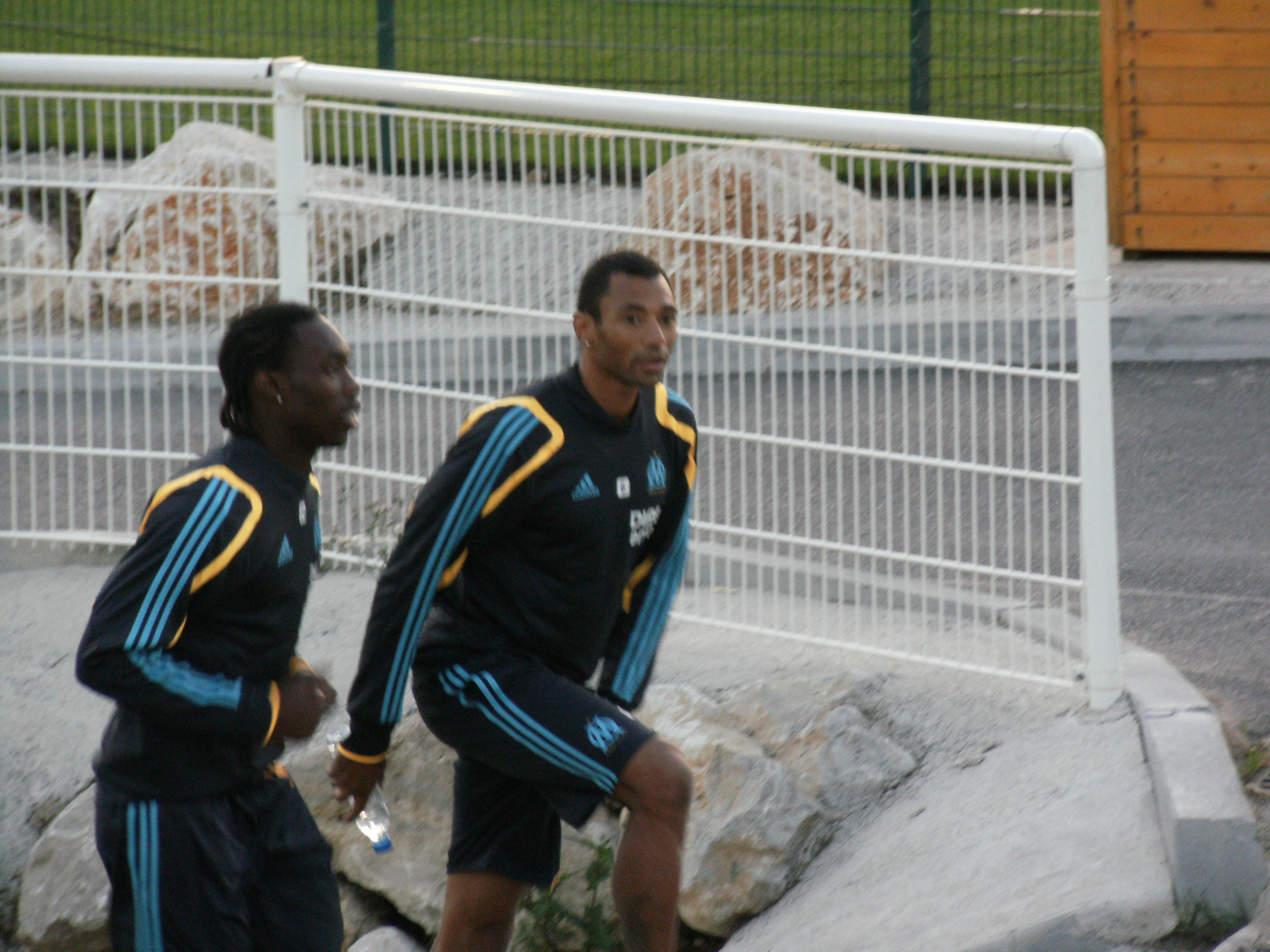
- Gnabouyou (left) with Édouard Cissé

Personal information
- Date of birth: 1 December 1989 (age 36)
- Place of birth: Marseille, France
- Height: 1.83 m (6 ft 0 in)
- Position: Forward

Youth career
- 2005–2007: Marseille

Senior career*
Years	Team	Apps	(Gls)
2007–2010	Marseille	5	(0)
2010–2011	Orléans	9	(2)
2011	Paris FC	10	(1)
2011–2013	Inter Turku	58	(12)
2014	AEL Kalloni	11	(0)
2014–2015	Sliema Wanderers	15	(2)
2015–2017	Inter Turku	75	(13)
2017	Torquay United	5	(0)
2018	ÍBV	8	(0)
2019	Iraklis	14	(2)
2019	Petrolul Ploiești	7	(0)
2020–2021	Sabah FA	7	(1)
2022	Gareji	10	(2)
2022–2023	Sioni Bolnisi	12	(2)

International career
2009	France U21	1	(0)
- * Club domestic league appearances and goals

Guy Gnabouyou (born 1 December 1989) is a French-Ivorian former professional footballer who played as a forward.

== Career ==
Gnabouyou made his debut with Marseille in the 2007–08 Ligue 1 against Le Mans UC72.

In 2017, he signed for National League team Torquay United after impressing in training sessions.

== Personal life ==
His sister Marie-Paule Gnabouyou is a team handball player.

== Honours ==
Marseille

- Trophée des Champions: 2010

Individual

- Veikkausliiga top assist provider: 2015
