= Leyti N'Diaye =

Senegalese footballer

Personal information
- Full name: Leyti N'Diaye
- Date of birth: August 19, 1985 (age 41)
- Place of birth: Dakar, Senegal
- Height: 1.88 m (6 ft 2 in)
- Position: Defender

Senior career*
Years	Team	Apps	(Gls)
2003–2004	Louhans-Cuiseaux	14	(0)
2004–2013	Marseille	9	(0)
2006	→ Créteil (loan)	9	(0)
2006–2007	→ RC Strasbourg (loan)	0	(0)
2008	→ Stade Reims (loan)	3	(0)
2009–2010	→ AC Ajaccio (loan)	44	(2)
2011–2012	→ AC Ajaccio (loan)	8	(0)
- * Club domestic league appearances and goals as of 15 May 2011

Leyti N'Diaye (born August 19, 1985 in Dakar) is a Senegalese footballer, who has played for Olympique de Marseille.

== Career ==
A defender, he joined Olympique de Marseille in 2004 but never managed to get much playing time. He was loaned to Créteil in January 2006 for six months, then loaned again to RC Strasbourg for the 2006–07 season. On 21 July 2009 AC Ajaccio have officially signed N'Diaye on loan from Olympique de Marseille, the defender has spent the last season at Stade Reims.

== Playing career ==
- 2003–04 : Louhans-Cuiseaux (14 matches)
- 2004–06 : Marseille (3 matches)
- 2006 : Créteil (9 matches)
- 2007–2013 : Marseille (3 matches)

== Honours ==
Marseille

- Trophée des Champions: 2010
