= Jean-Claude Dassier =

French journalist and businessman (born 1941)

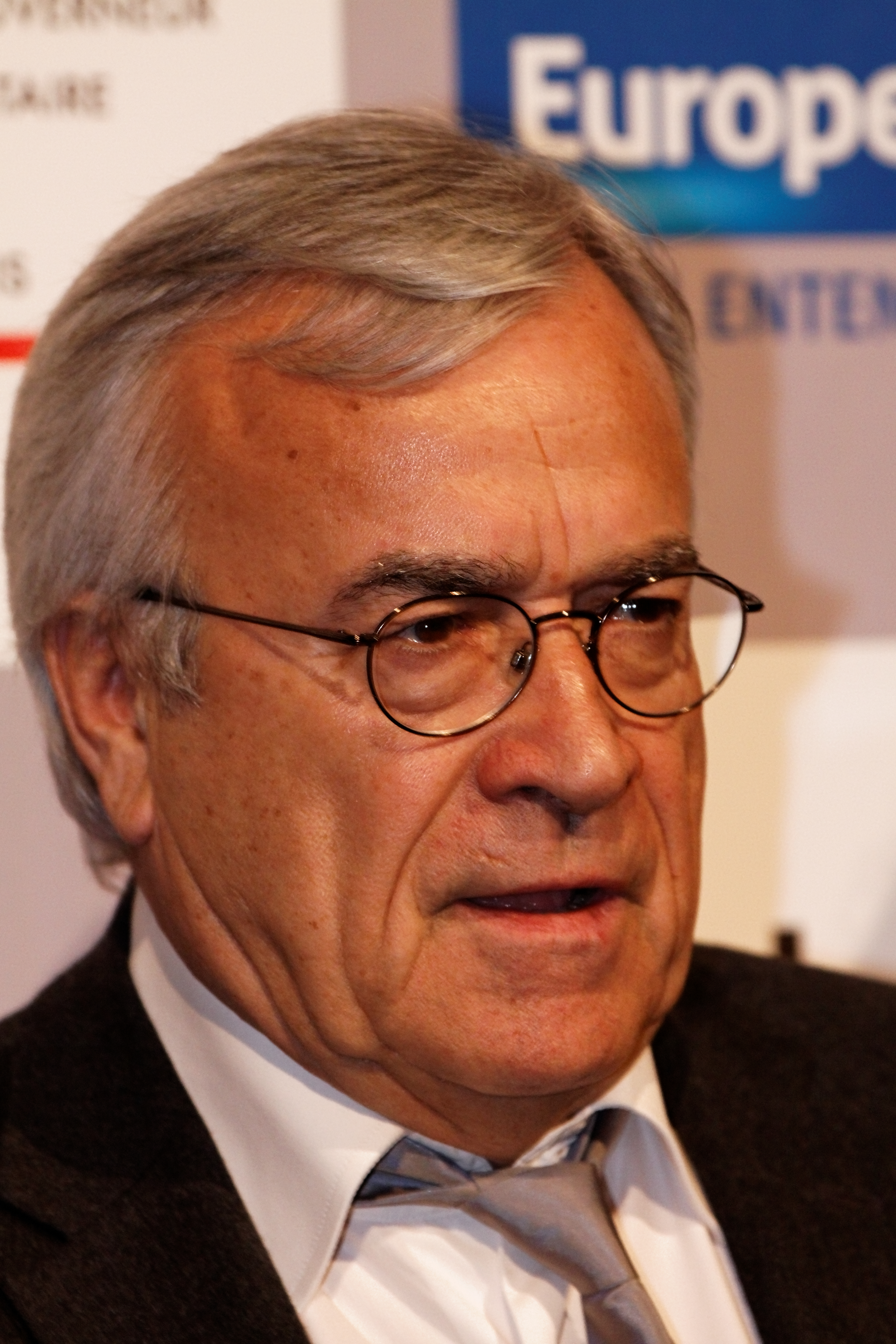
- Dassier in 2011
- Born: 28 July 1941 (age 85); Paris, France
- Occupations: Consultant; Columnist
- Employer: CNews
- Known for: President of Marseille (2009-2011)
- Predecessor: Pape Diouf
- Successor: Vincent Labrune

Jean-Claude Dassier, born on July 28, 1941 in the 15th district of Paris, is a French journalist and businessman.

He regularly appears on the continuous news channel CNews and belongs to the editorial committee of Valeurs actuelles.

He was editor-in-chief of the radio station Europe 1, general manager of the continuous news channel LCI from 1996 to 2008, director of information of TF1 from 2008 to 2009 and president of the French football club Olympique de Marseille from 2009 to 2011.

Sporting positions
Preceded by Pape Diouf	President of Olympique de Marseille; 2009–2011	Succeeded by Vincent Labrune

== President’s Honours at Olympique de Marseille ==
- Champion of France, Ligue 1 in 2010
- Winner of Coupe de la Ligue in 2010 and 2011
- Winner of Trophée des champions in 2010
