= 2009–10 Olympique de Marseille season =

Marseille
2009–10 season
- Chairman: Jean-Claude Dassier
- Manager: Didier Deschamps
- Ligue 1: 1st
- Coupe de France: Round of 32
- Coupe de la Ligue: Winners
- UEFA Champions League: Group stage (3rd)
- UEFA Europa League: Round of 16
- Top goalscorer: League: Mamadou Niang (18); All: Mamadou Niang (22)
- Highest home attendance: 56,282 (3 November vs Zürich, UEFA Champions League)
- Lowest home attendance: 19,217 (27 January vs Lille, Coupe de la Ligue)
- Average home league attendance: 48,892 (Ligue 1)
Home colours	Away colours	Third colours

The 2009–10 season of Olympique de Marseille (OM) had the club being involved in five competitions: the Ligue 1, the Coupe de France, the Coupe de la Ligue, the UEFA Champions League, and the UEFA Europa League. They won the Ligue 1 for the first time in 18 years. They also won the Coupe de la Ligue. In the UEFA Champions League, they were eliminated in the group stage. They finished third and were given a place in the UEFA Europa League knockout stages. They were eliminated in the round of 16 by Benfica.

== Club ==
=== Coaching staff ===
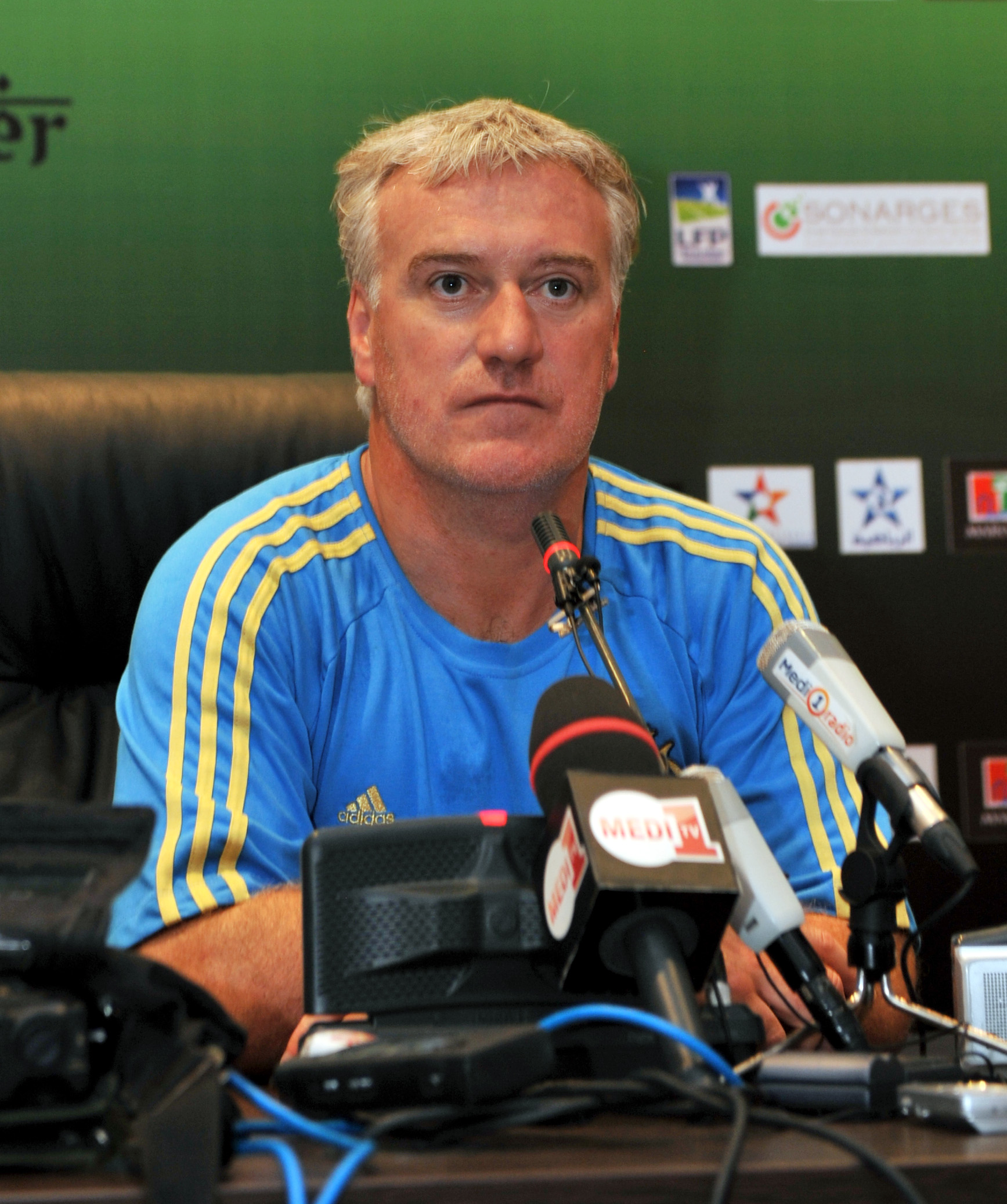
This is Didier Deschamps' first season with Marseille as a coach.

Position	Staff
Coach	(France) Didier Deschamps
Assistant coach	(France) Guy Stéphan
Goalkeeping coach	(France) Laurent Spinosi
Fitness coach	(France) Christophe Manouvrier
Club doctor	(France) Christophe Baudot
Chief scout	(France) Jean-Philippe Durand

Last updated: 15 May 2010
Source: Olympique de Marseille

=== Kit ===
This new season Adidas introduced Marseille's new kits, and these new ones are very different from last season, except the home kit, the colours of Marseille still stay white and sky blue. The away kit is an impressive kit with it being sky blue and has shades of black. The third kit was so far used in European competitions only. This kit is a full black kit but still has a little sky blue. In all of Marseille's kits there is one their main colour sky blue one.

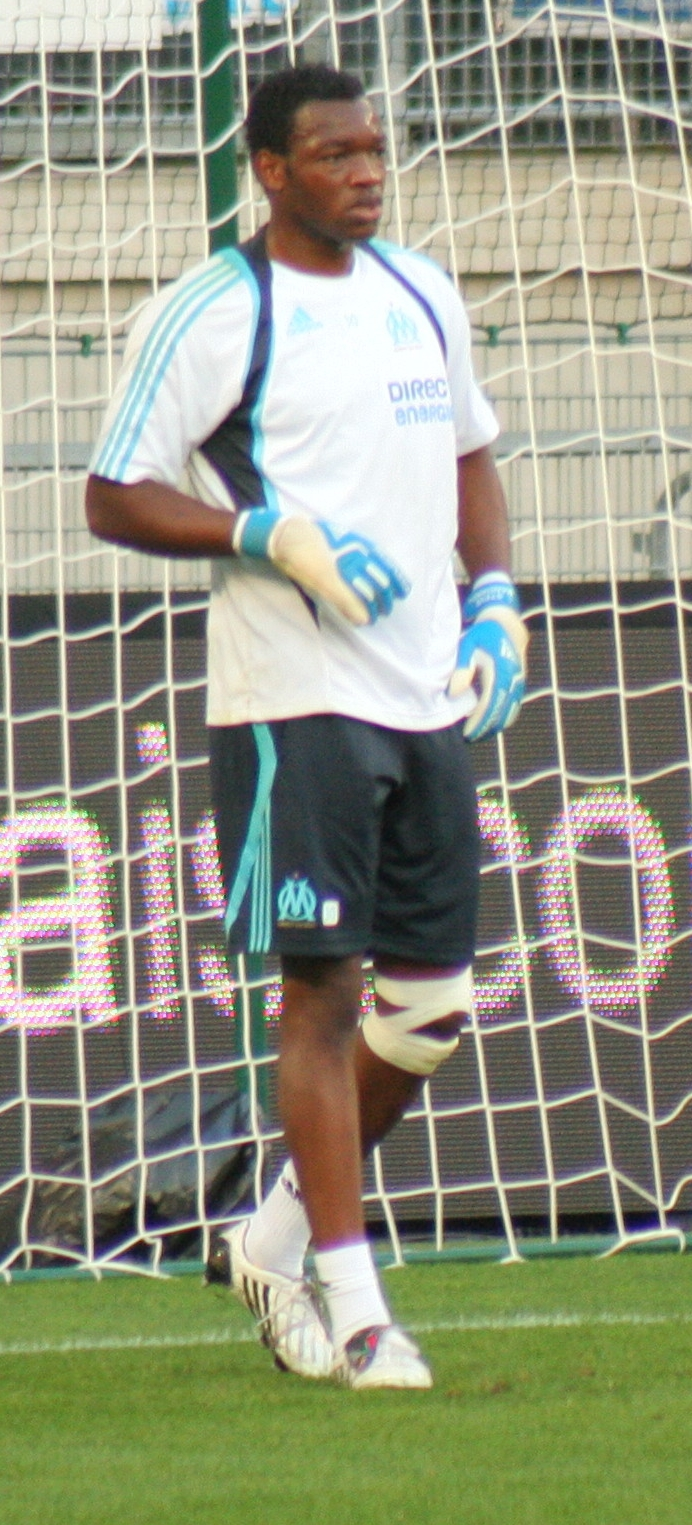
Steve Mandanda in l'OM's training outfit.

Home	Away	Third	RLD

Supplier : Adidas

Sponsor : Direct Energie

=== Other information ===
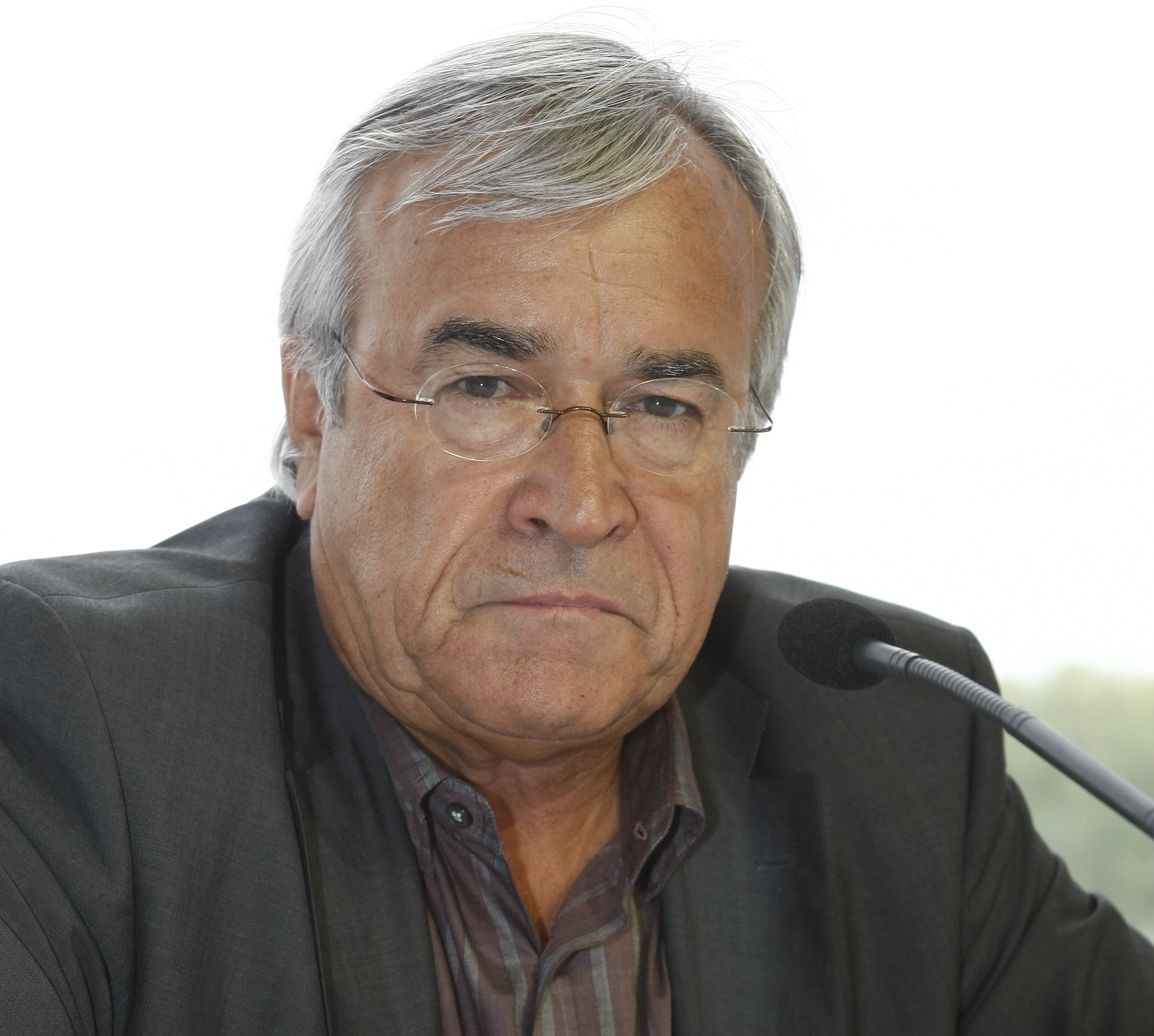
Jean-Claude Dassier is the chairman of the club since June 2009.

Chairman	(France) Jean-Claude Dassier
Ground (capacity and dimensions)	Stade Vélodrome (60,013 / {{{d}}})

Updated to match played 8 February 2009

== Squad ==
The professional staff of the 2009–10 season, led by Deschamps and his assistant Guy Stéphan, has eight home-grown players. 13 are international players in the team, including two France team members. The goalkeeping coach is Laurent Spinosi, who has four players under his wing, including Steve Mandanda, one of the current choices of the France national team. Taye Taiwo and Mamadou Niang are the longest tenured OM players, with 193 and 179 games played, respectively, as of 25 June 2009.

=== First-team squad ===
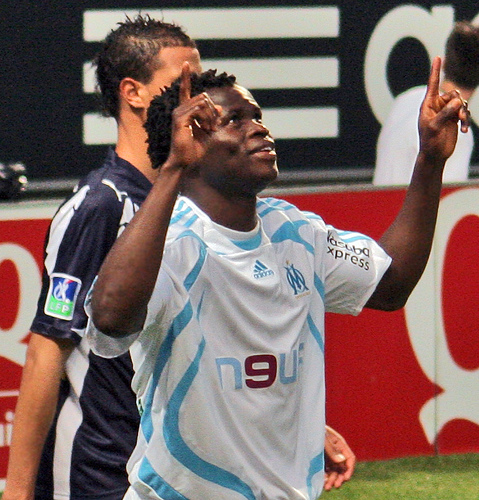
Taye Taiwo is the current Marseille player with the most appearances. Since 2004 he has been appeared in 193 games for l'OM. Updated 25 June 2009.

Updated 15 May 2010.

Note: Flags indicate national team as defined under FIFA eligibility rules; some limited exceptions apply. Players may hold more than one non-FIFA nationality.

No.	Pos.	Nation	Player
1	GK	FRA	Rudy Riou
3	DF	NGR	Taye Taiwo
4	DF	FRA	Julien Rodriguez
5	DF	BRA	Hilton
6	MF	FRA	Édouard Cissé
7	MF	FRA	Benoît Cheyrou
8	MF	ARG	Lucho González
9	FW	BRA	Brandão
10	MF	FRA	Hatem Ben Arfa
11	FW	SEN	Mamadou Niang (captain)
12	MF	BFA	Charles Kaboré
14	FW	CIV	Bakari Koné
15	MF	GHA	Jordan Ayew
17	MF	CMR	Stéphane Mbia

No.	Pos.	Nation	Player
18	MF	FRA	Fabrice Abriel
19	DF	ARG	Gabriel Heinze
20	DF	CMR	Charley Roussel Fomen
21	DF	SEN	Souleymane Diawara
22	DF	FRA	Cyril Rool
23	FW	ESP	Fernando Morientes
24	DF	FRA	Laurent Bonnart
27	DF	SEN	Pape M'Bow
28	MF	FRA	Mathieu Valbuena
30	GK	FRA	Steve Mandanda
31	FW	FRA	Guy Gnabouyou
32	FW	GAB	Alexander N'Doumbou
34	MF	FRA	Kevin Osei
40	GK	BRA	Elinton Andrade

=== Out on loan ===
Note: Flags indicate national team as defined under FIFA eligibility rules; some limited exceptions apply. Players may hold more than one non-FIFA nationality.

No.	Pos.	Nation	Player
13	DF	SEN	Leyti N'Diaye (at Ajaccio until end of the 2009–10 season)
26	DF	FRA	Jean-Philippe Sabo (at Ajaccio until end of the 2009–10 season)
–	FW	MLI	Mamadou Samassa (at Valenciennes until end of the 2009–10 season)
–	FW	GHA	André Ayew (at Arles-Avignon until end of the 2009–10 season)
–	FW	FRA	Mohamed Amine Dennoun (at Amiens until end of the 2009–10 season)
–	DF	FRA	Cédric D'Ulivo (at Cassis Carnoux until end of the 2009–10 season)
2	DF	FRA	Garry Bocaly (at Montpellier until end of the 2009–10 season)

=== Reserve squad ===
Updated 8 February 2010.

Note: Flags indicate national team as defined under FIFA eligibility rules; some limited exceptions apply. Players may hold more than one non-FIFA nationality.

No.	Pos.	Nation	Player
—	GK	FRA	Johan Crespin
—	GK	FRA	Samir Kouakbi
—	DF	FRA	Sébastien Bregand
—	DF	FRA	Bradley Diallo
—	DF	FRA	Sébastien Fischetti
—	DF	FRA	Raphaël Lopes
—	DF	TOG	Sénah Mango
—	MF	FRA	Samir Abbes
—	MF	FRA	Landing Bodian

No.	Pos.	Nation	Player
—	MF	FRA	Olivier Cano
—	MF	FRA	Alexander N'Doumbou
—	MF	FRA	Ahmed Nouri
—	MF	FRA	Thomas Pechart
—	MF	FRA	Emmanuel Schianchi
—	FW	FRA	Jordan Ayew
—	FW	FRA	Nicolas Crus
—	FW	FRA	Cédric Hachani
—	FW	CRO	Niko Maričić

== Statistics ==
=== Overall ===
Last updated on 15 May 2010

Games played	54 (38 Ligue 1, 6 UEFA Champions League, 4 UEFA Europa League, 4 Coupe de la Ligue, 2 Coupe de France)
Games won	32 (23 Ligue 1, 2 UEFA Champions League, 2 UEFA Europa League, 4 Coupe de la Ligue, 1 Coupe de France)
Games drawn	11 (9 Ligue 1, 1 UEFA Champions League, 1 UEFA Europa League)
Games lost	11 (6 Ligue 1, 3 UEFA Champions League, 1 UEFA Europa League, 1 Coupe de France)
Goals scored	100 (69 Ligue 1, 10 UEFA Champions League, 8 UEFA Europa League, 10 Coupe de la Ligue, 3 Coupe de France)
Goals conceded	59 (36 Ligue 1, 10 UEFA Champions League, 5 UEFA Europa League, 5 Coupe de la Ligue, 3 Coupe de France)
Yellow cards	92 (64 Ligue 1, 12 UEFA Champions League, 8 UEFA Europa League, 7 Coupe de la Ligue, 1 Coupe de France)
Red cards	5 (2 Ligue 1, 2 UEFA Champions League, 1 UEFA Europa League)
Best result	6–1 (H) v FC Zürich - UEFA Champions League - 3 November 2009
Worst result	0–3 (A) v Real Madrid - UEFA Champions League - 30 September 2009
Most appearances	(Senegal) Diawara and (France) Mandanda (50 matches)
Top scorer	(Senegal) Niang (22 goals)

=== Squad stats ===
The list is sorted by position and total appearances.

Last updated on 15 May 2010.

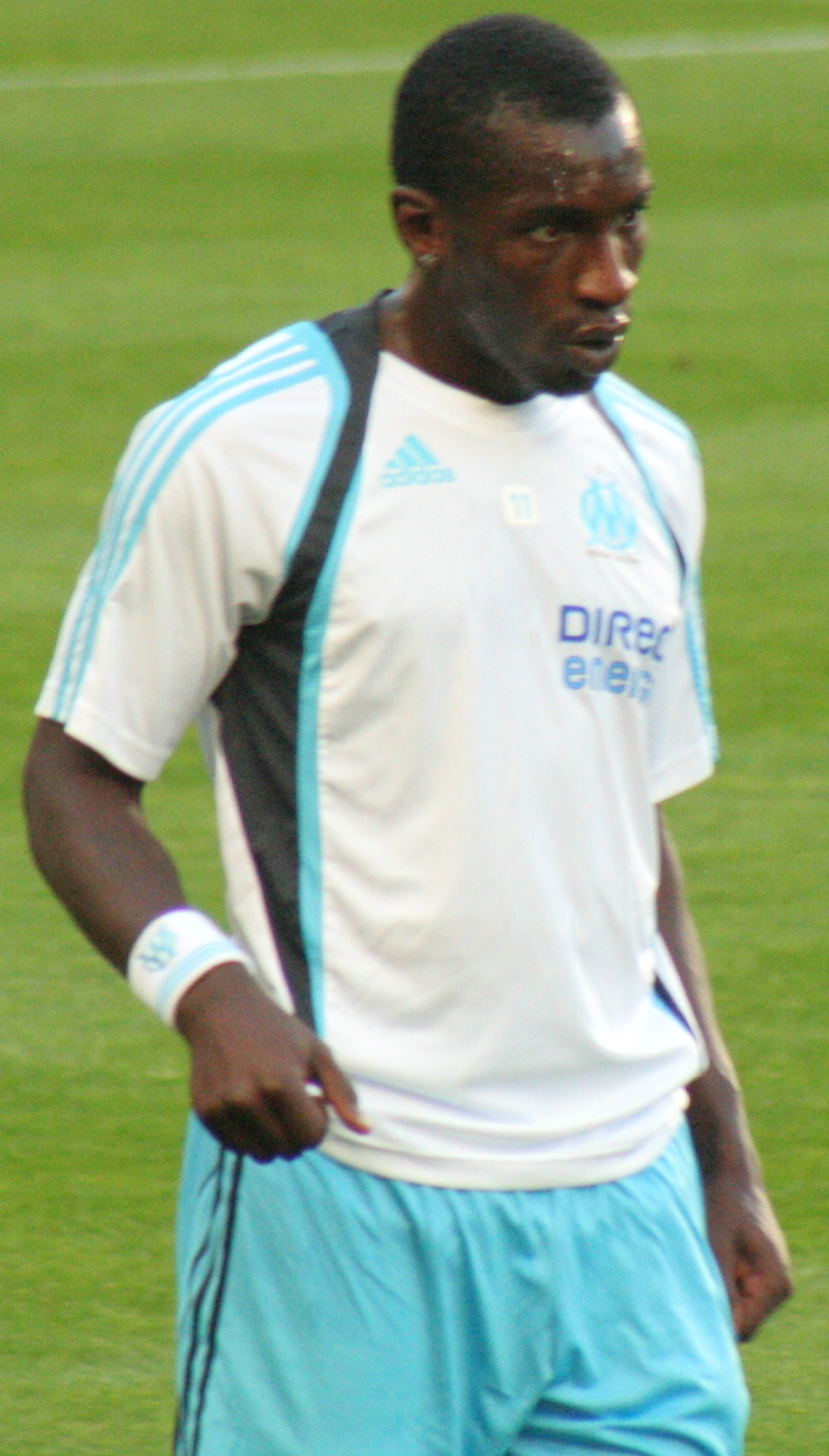
Marseille's captain Mamadou Niang is the top scorer of Marseille and the Ligue 1.

No.	Pos	Nat	Player	Total		Ligue 1		Champions League & Europa League		Coupe de la Ligue		Coupe de France	
No.	Pos	Nat	Player	Apps	Goals	Apps	Goals	Apps	Goals	Apps	Goals	Apps	Goals
Goalkeepers
30	GK	(France) FRA	Steve Mandanda	50	0	36	0	10	0	2	0	2	0
40	GK	(Brazil) BRA	Elinton Andrade	6	0	2+1	0	0	0	2+1	0	0	0
Defenders
21	DF	(Senegal) SEN	Souleymane Diawara	50	5	36	4	9	0	4	1	1	0
24	DF	(France) FRA	Laurent Bonnart	44	0	30+1	0	8	0	4	0	1	0
3	DF	(Nigeria) NGR	Taye Taiwo	38	3	25+3	3	8	0	1	0	1	0
21	DF	(Cameroon) CMR	Stéphane Mbia	37	2	26+1	2	7	0	2	0	1	0
19	DF	(Argentina) ARG	Gabriel Heinze	36	6	26+1	4	6+1	2	1+1	0	0	0
5	DF	(Brazil) BRA	Hilton	20	2	9+3	1	3	1	2+1	0	2	0
27	DF	(Senegal) SEN	Pape M'Bow	8	0	0+3	0	0+1	0	0+2	0	1+1	0
4	DF	(France) FRA	Julien Rodriguez	1	0	0	0	0+1	0	0	0	0	0
Midfielders
18	MF	(France) FRA	Fabrice Abriel	47	2	18+14	1	7+2	1	2+2	0	2	0
7	MF	(France) FRA	Benoît Cheyrou	46	8	27+5	5	10	1	2	0	2	2
6	MF	(France) FRA	Édouard Cissé	45	1	27+5	1	7+1	0	4	0	1	0
8	MF	(Argentina) ARG	Lucho González	44	8	28+4	5	8	2	4	1	0	0
28	MF	(France) FRA	Mathieu Valbuena	43	7	19+12	5	2+4	0	2+2	2	1+1	0
12	MF	(Burkina Faso) BFA	Charles Kaboré	35	2	17+8	1	2+4	1	3	0	1	0
22	MF	(France) FRA	Cyril Rool	2	0	1+1	0	0	0	0	0	0	0
32	MF	(Gabon) GAB	Alexander N'Doumbou	2	0	0	0	0	0	0	0	0+2	0
Forwards
11	FW	(Senegal) SEN	Mamadou Niang	46	22	29+3	18	9	3	3+1	1	1	0
9	FW	(Brazil) BRA	Brandão	43	13	27+3	8	7+1	1	3	4	1+1	0
10	FW	(France) FRA	Hatem Ben Arfa	41	7	17+12	3	1+6	3	3+1	0	1	1
14	FW	(Ivory Coast) CIV	Bakari Koné	36	6	11+16	4	3+4	2	0+1	0	1	0
23	FW	(Spain) ESP	Fernando Morientes	19	1	4+8	1	2+3	0	0	0	1+1	0
15	FW	(Ghana) GHA	Jordan Ayew	4	1	0+4	1	0	0	0	0	0	0
Player(s) who left the club after the start of the season:
2	DF	(France) FRA	Garry Bocaly	6	0	3+1	0	1	0	0	0	1	0

== Friendlies ==
=== Pre-season friendlies ===
Marseille started their season with six pre-season friendlies; they won four, drew one, and lost one. During these friendlies, they scored eight goals and only conceded four. Mamadou Niang, Brandão, Hatem Ben Arfa, and Stéphane Mbia each scored a goal while Bakari Koné and Taye Taiwo scored two goals each.

10 July 2009	Dinamo București	1–2	Marseille	Thonon-les-Bains
	Dănciulescu 44'		14' Ben Arfa; 22' Niang	Stadium: Stade Joseph-Moynat; Attendance: 6,000; Referee: Olivier Dumoulin

17 July 2009	Ajaccio	0–1	Marseille	Le Pontet
			20' Taiwo	Stadium: Stade de Fargues; Attendance: 5,000; Referee: Didier Falcone

21 July 2009	Bordeaux	2–1	Marseille	Dax
	González 37' (o.g.); Gourcuff 48'		18' Taiwo	Stadium: Stade Maurice Boyau; Attendance: 11,000; Referee: Damien Ledentu

25 July 2009	Ajaccio	1–1	Marseille	Albi
	Gignac 73'		7' Koné	Stadium: Stadium Municipal; Attendance: 6,000; Referee: Vincent Teulet

29 July 2009	Saint-Étienne	0–1	Marseille	Valence
			60' Koné	Stadium: Stade Georges Pompidou; Attendance: 12,500; Referee: Sébastien Dessiage

1 August 2009	Lens	0–2	Marseille	Lens
			46' Brandão; 74' Mbia	Stadium: Stade Félix-Bollaert; Attendance: 36,000; Referee: Ruddy Buquet

=== Other friendlies ===
4 September 2009	Monaco	2–0	Marseille	Cannes
	Coutadeur 1'; Muratori 60'			Stadium: Stade Pierre de Coubertin; Attendance: 6,000; Referee: Didier Falcone

9 October 2009	Nîmes	1–2	Marseille	Nîmes
	Poulain 31'		11' Morientes; 87' Ben Arfa	Stadium: Stade des Costières; Attendance: 12,000; Referee: Philippe Malige

13 November 2009	Arles-Avignon	2–2	Marseille	Avignon
	Psaume 21'; Guise 54'		61' Abriel; 79' Morientes	Stadium: Parc des Sports; Attendance: 3,500; Referee: Didier Falcone

9 October 2009	Languedoc-Roussillon XI	1–4	Marseille	Perpignan
	Aabiza 48'		49', 62' Gnabouyou; 78' N'Doumbou; 90' Abriel	Stadium: Stade Gilbert Brutus; Attendance: 3,000; Referee: Abdelali Chaoui

== Competitions ==
=== Overall ===
Competition	Started round	Current position / round	Final position / round	First match	Last match
Ligue 1	4th	—	1st	8 August 2009	15 May 2010
Coupe de France	Round of 64	—	Round of 32	10 January 2010	10 February 2010
Coupe de la Ligue	Round of 16	—	Winner	13 January 2010	27 March 2010
UEFA Champions League	Group stage	—	Group stage	15 September 2009	8 December 2009
UEFA Europa League	Round of 32	—	Round of 16	18 February 2010	18 March 2010

Updated to match played 5 Apr
Source: Competitions

=== Ligue 1 ===
Marseille started their Ligue 1 campaign with an impressive 2–0 victory and continued through a very fine form usually never being below 6th so they did have some very hard times, dropping points and losing or drawing important games but soon after they were flying high and now after 30 games, l'OM tops the Ligue 1 with a game in hand. Now that it has reached the firing line in the league, Marseille are in the lead but there are many challengers for the Ligue 1 with only 3 points splitting the top five teams.

==== League table ====
Pos	Team	Pld	W	D	L	GF	GA	GD	Pts	Qualification or relegation
1	Marseille (C)	38	23	9	6	69	36	+33	78	Qualification to Champions League group stage
2	Lyon	38	20	12	6	64	38	+26	72	Qualification to Champions League group stage
3	Auxerre	38	20	11	7	42	29	+13	71	Qualification to Champions League play-off round
4	Lille	38	21	7	10	72	40	+32	70	Qualification to Europa League play-off round (Note: Coupe de France winners Paris Saint-Germain qualify for the 2010–11 UEFA Europa League Play-off round of 2010–11 UEFA Europa League.)
5	Montpellier	38	20	9	9	50	40	+10	69	Qualification to Europa League third qualifying round (Note: Coupe de la Ligue winners Marseille finished as champions, fulfilling a finish of at least 4th place, thus their Europa League Third qualifying round berth will go to the 5th placed team in the league.)

Source: Ligue 1
Rules for classification: 1) points; 2) goal difference; 3) number of goals scored.
(C) Champions

==== Results summary ====
Overall								Home						Away					
Pld	W	D	L	GF	GA	GD	Pts	W	D	L	GF	GA	GD	W	D	L	GF	GA	GD
38	23	9	6	69	36	+33	78	14	3	2	37	14	+23	9	6	4	32	22	+10

Source: lfp.fr

==== Results by round ====
Round	1	2	3	4	5	6	7	8	9	10	11	12	13	14	15	16	17	18	19	20	21	22	23	24	25	26	27	28	29	30	31	32	33	34	35	36	37	38
Ground	A	H	A	A	H	A	H	A	H	H	A	H	A	A	H	A	A	A	H	A	H	A	H	A	H	A	H	A	H	H	H	A	A	H	A	H	A	H
Result	W	W	D	D	W	W	L	L	W	W	W	D	D	W	L	W	W	D	L	D	W	L	W	W	W	W	W	D	W	W	W	W	W	W	D	W	L	W
Position	4	3	4	5	1	3	3	5	5	3	3	3	3	1	3	2	2	2	2	3	2	4	3	3	2	1	1	1	1	1	1	1	1	1	1	1	1	1

Source: Matches
A = Away; H = Home; W = Win; D = Draw; L = Loss

==== Matches ====
Win Draw Loss

8 August 2009 1	Grenoble	0–2	Marseille	Grenoble
		(Report)	2' Niang; 80' Cheyrou	Stadium: Stade des Alpes; Attendance: 19,622; Referee: Philippe Kalt

16 August 2009 2	Marseille	1–0	Lille	Montpellier
	Brandão 11'	(Report)		Stadium: Stade de la Mosson; Attendance: 26,965; Referee: Fredy Fautrel

22 August 2009 3	Rennes	1–1	Marseille	Rennes
	Leroy 37' (pen.)	(Report)	52' Niang	Stadium: Stade de la Route de Lorient; Attendance: 28,631; Referee: Philippe Malige

30 August 2009 4	Marseille	0–0	Bordeaux	Marseille
		(Report)		Stadium: Stade Vélodrome; Attendance: 55,920; Referee: Antony Gautier

12 September 2009 5	Le Mans	1–2	Marseille	Le Mans
	Maïga 61'	(Report)	14' Niang; 70' Brandão	Stadium: Stade Léon-Bollée; Attendance: 16,301; Referee: Tony Chapron

19 September 2009 6	Marseille	4–2	Montpellier	Marseille
	González 31'; Niang 34'; Cissé 39'; Diawara 50'	(Report)	75' Belhanda; 88' (pen.) Camara	Stadium: Stade Vélodrome; Attendance: 52,351; Referee: Olivier Thual

26 September 2009 7	Valenciennes	3–2	Marseille	Valenciennes
	Biševac 21'; Ducourtioux 28'; Rafael 84'	(Report)	13' Morientes; 22' Niang	Stadium: Stade Nungesser; Attendance: 16,208; Referee: Fredy Fautrel

4 October 2009 8	Marseille	1–2	Monaco	Marseille
21:00	Niang 85'	(Report)	20' Nenê; 42' Park	Stadium: Stade Vélodrome; Attendance: 48,566; Referee: Stéphane Bre

17 October 2009 9	Nancy	0–3	Marseille	Nancy
19:00		(Report)	5' Valbuena; 79' Brandão; 81' Abriel	Stadium: Stade Marcel Picot; Attendance: 20,057; Referee: Philippe Kalt

31 October 2009 10	Marseille	1–1	Toulouse	Marseille
19:00	Brandão 75'	(Report)	27' Sissoko	Stadium: Stade Vélodrome; Attendance: 53,340; Referee: Saïd Ennjimi

8 November 2009 11	Lyon	5–5	Marseille	Lyon
21:00	Pjanić 5'; Govou 14'; López 80', 83' (pen.); Bastos 90+1'	(Report)	11' Diawara; 44' Cheyrou; 47' Koné; 79' Brandão; 90+2' (o.g.) Toulalan	Stadium: Stade de Gerland; Attendance: 38,018; Referee: Stéphane Bré

20 November 2009 12	Marseille	1–0	Paris Saint-Germain	Marseille
21:00	Heinze 25'	(Report)		Stadium: Stade Vélodrome; Attendance: 55,623; Referee: Laurent Duhamel

28 November 2009 13	Lens	1–0	Marseille	Lens
21:00	Eduardo 90+4'	(Report)		Stadium: Stade Félix-Bollaert; Attendance: 41,052; Referee: Damien Ledentu

5 December 2009 14	Nice	1–3	Marseille	Nice
19:00	Couibaly 33'	(Report)	19' Niang; 77' González; 86' Koné	Stadium: Stade Municipal du Ray; Attendance: 15,047; Referee: Lionel Jaffredo

12 December 2009 15	Marseille	2–0	Boulogne	Marseille
19:00	Heinze 48'; Taiwo 54' (pen.)	(Report)		Stadium: Stade Vélodrome; Attendance: 47,575; Referee: Alexandre Castro

16 December 2009 16	Lorient	1–2	Marseille	Lorient
19:00	Vihirau 53' (pen.)	(Report)	68' J. Ayew; 90+2' Diawara	Stadium: Stade du Moustoir; Attendance: 11,634; Referee: Clément Turpin

19 December 2009 17	Saint-Étienne	0–0	Marseille	Saint-Étienne
19:00		(Report)		Stadium: Stade Geoffroy-Guichard; Attendance: 27,614; Referee: Antony Gautier

16 December 2009 18	Marseille	0–2	Auxerre	Marseille
19:00		(Report)	40', 79' Oliech	Stadium: Stade Vélodrome; Attendance: 49,966; Referee: Philippe Malige

18 January 2010 19	Bordeaux	1–1	Marseille	Bordeaux
21:00	Mandanda 45+1' (o.g.)	(Report)	81' Cheyrou	Stadium: Stade Chaban Delmas; Attendance: 32,771; Referee: Laurent Duhamel

20 January 2010 20	Marseille	2–1	Le Mans	Marseille
19:00	Niang 30', 56' (pen.)	(Report)	16' Le Tallec	Stadium: Stade Vélodrome; Attendance: 44,907; Referee: Damien Ledentu

30 January 2010 21	Montpellier HSC	2–0	Marseille	Montpellier
21:00	Aït-Fana 49'; Cheyrou 76' (o.g.)	(Report)		Stadium: Stade de la Mosson; Attendance: 29,051; Referee: Fredy Fautrel

7 February 2010 22	Marseille	5–1	Valenciennes	Marseille
21:00	González 33'; Brandão 43'; Cheyrou 53'; Valbuena 77'; Niang 90+1'	(Report)	66' Sánchez	Stadium: Stade Vélodrome; Attendance: 46,306; Referee: Wilfried Bien

13 February 2010 23	Monaco	1–2	Marseille	Monaco
19:00	Maazou 40'	(Report)	37' (pen.) Niang; 89' (o.g.) N'Koulou	Stadium: Stade Louis II; Attendance: 13,063; Referee: Saïd Ennjimi

21 February 2010 24	Marseille	3–1	Nancy	Marseille
17:00	Niang 10', 34', 67'	(Report)	13' André Luiz	Stadium: Stade Vélodrome; Attendance: 47,975; Referee: Clément Turpin

28 February 2010 25	Paris Saint-Germain	0–3	Marseille	Paris
21:00		(Report)	15' Ben Arfa; 54' González; 71' Cheyrou	Stadium: Parc des Princes; Attendance: 43,813; Referee: Antony Gautier

7 March 2010 26	Marseille	1–1	Lorient	Marseille
17:00	Niang 42'	(Report)	64' Koscielny	Stadium: Stade Vélodrome; Attendance: 48,290; Referee: Philippe Kalt

13 March 2010 27	Toulouse	1–1	Marseille	Toulouse
21:00	Machado 39'	(Report)	30' Brandão	Stadium: Stadium Municipal; Attendance: 27,249; Referee: Saïd Ennjimi

21 March 2010 28	Marseille	2–1	Lyon	Marseille
21:00	Kaboré 68'; Taiwo 81'	(Report)	80' Gomis	Stadium: Stade Vélodrome; Attendance: 52,557; Referee: Fredy Fautrel

4 April 2010 29	Marseille	1–0	Lens	Marseille
17:00	Brandão 22'	(Report)		Stadium: Stade Vélodrome; Attendance: 54,839; Referee: Philippe Malige

7 April 2010 30	Marseille	3–0	Sochaux	Marseille
19:00	Heinze 9'; Ben Arfa 27' (pen.); Koné 90+1'	(Report)		Stadium: Stade Vélodrome; Attendance: 48,198; Referee: Stéphane Bré

11 April 2010 31	Marseille	4–1	Nice	Marseille
21:00	Koné 42'; Mbia 52'; Valbuena 70'; Diawara 74'	(Report)	Faé 90+2'	Stadium: Stade Vélodrome; Attendance: 51,229; Referee: Lionel Jaffredo

14 April 2010 32	Sochaux	0–1	Marseille	Montbéliard
		(Report)	Mbia 88'	Stadium: Stade Auguste Bonal; Attendance: 19,992; Referee: Wilfried Bien

17 April 2010 33	Boulogne	1–2	Marseille	Boulogne-sur-Mer
19:00	Blayac 82'	(Report)	Valbuena 44'; Taiwo 90' (pen.)	Stadium: Stade de la Libération; Attendance: 15,249; Referee: Pascal Vileo

25 April 2010 34	Marseille	1–0	Saint-Étienne	Marseille
	Valbuena 6'	(Report)		Stadium: Stade Vélodrome; Attendance: 55,056; Referee: Clemente Turpin

2 May 2010 35	Auxerre	0–0	Marseille	Auxerre
		(Report)		Stadium: Stade l'Abbé-Deschamps; Attendance: 20,005; Referee: Herve Piccirillo

5 May 2010 36	Marseille	3–1	Rennais	Marseille
	Heinze 5'; Niang 76'; González 77'	(Report)	38' Briand	Stadium: Stade Vélodrome; Attendance: 55,377; Referee: Ruddy Buquet

8 May 2010 37	Lille	3–2	Marseille	Lille
	Cabaye 28' (pen.); De Melo 81'	(Report)	6' Niang; 44' Hilton	Stadium: Stadium Lille-Metropole; Attendance: 17,688; Referee: Fred Frautel

15 May 2010 38	Marseille	2–0	Grenoble	Marseille
	Niang 41' (pen.); Ben Arfa 90'	(Report)		Stadium: Stade Vélodrome; Attendance: 55,808; Referee: Philippe Kalt

=== Coupe de France ===
Marseille entered the Coupe de France in the round of 64 some other Ligue 1 sides. They won their first game against Trélissac thanks to Ben Arfa and Cheyrou. Marseille's next game in the Coupe de France is against Lens a team that they lost to in 2009–10 Ligue 1. l'OM lost the round of 32 clash being knockout at the same round last season when they lost to Lyon but this time it was against Lens.

10 January 2010 Round of 64	Trélissac	0–2	Marseille	Périgueux
			16' Ben Arfa; 74' Cheyrou	Stadium: Stade Francis Rongerias

23 January 2010 Round of 32	Lens	3–1	Marseille	Lens
	Jemâa 20', 45'; Maoulida 57'		62' Cheyrou	Stadium: Stade Félix-Bollaert; Attendance: 27,044; Referee: Pascal Viléo

=== Coupe de la Ligue ===
Marseille started their Coupe de la Ligue campaign in the round of 16 where they came up against a team that they drew with in Ligue 1 but instead they were focused this time and determined to stay in this competition so they beat Saint-Étienne at the very last moment with a Niang goal in the 90+4-minute. In the quarter-finals Marseille beat Lille then Toulouse FC after extra time in the semi-finals. For the final, l'OM will play against the winner of the match FC Lorient–Girondins de Bordeaux.

13 January 2010 Round of 16	Saint-Étienne	2–3	Marseille	Saint-Étienne
20:45 CET	Sako 18'; Bergessio 30'		28', 50' Brandão; 90' Niang	Stadium: Stade Geoffroy-Guichard; Attendance: 15,774; Referee: Lionel Jaffredo

27 January 2010 Quarter-finals	Marseille	2–1	Lille	Marseille
20:45 CET	González 9'; Valbuena 81'	Report	4' Melo	Stadium: Stade Vélodrome; Attendance: 19,217; Referee: Hervé Piccirillo

3 February 2010 Semi-finals	Toulouse	1–2 (a.e.t.)	Marseille	Toulouse
20:45 CET	Gignac 59'	Report	86', 105' Brandão	Stadium: Stadium Municipal; Attendance: 26,548; Referee: Lionel Jaffredo

27 March 2010 Final	Marseille	3–1	Bordeaux	Saint-Denis
20:50 CET	Diawara 60'; Valbuena 67'; Chalmé 77' (o.g.)	Report	84' Sané	Stadium: Stade de France; Attendance: 79,000; Referee: Stéphane Lannoy

=== UEFA Champions League ===
Marseille were put into pot three in group C with two big football giants Real Madrid and Milan. Marseille started off poorly, losing their opening game at home to Milan. In their next game, Marseille also lost by a large margin, 3–0 to Real Madrid. Marseille had to win games if they are to stay in the Champions league and they did just that, winning against Swiss champions Zürich in both of their away and home matches. Marseille still continued their fine form but failed to get three points away at Italy. They could only earn one point, meaning that they must win their next clash against Real Madrid or else they are in the Europa League and also hope that Milan lose to Zürich, but it was not to be; Marseille lost 3–1 to Madrid, meaning that they will go into the Europa League as a seeded team.

==== Group C ====
Pos	Team	Pld	W	D	L	GF	GA	GD	Pts	Qualification
1	(Spain) Real Madrid	6	4	1	1	15	7	+8	13	Advance to knockout phase
2	(Italy) Milan	6	2	3	1	8	7	+1	9	Advance to knockout phase
3	(France) Marseille	6	2	1	3	10	10	0	7	Transfer to Europa League
4	(Switzerland) Zürich	6	1	1	4	5	14	−9	4	

Source: RSSSF

15 September 2009 1	Marseille (France)	1–2	(Italy) Milan	Marseille, France
20:45	Heinze 49'	Report	28', 74' Inzaghi	Stadium: Stade Vélodrome; Attendance: 55,434; Referee: Claus Bo Larsen (Denmark)

30 September 2009 2	Real Madrid (Spain)	3–0	(France) Marseille	Madrid, Spain
20:45	Ronaldo 58', 64'; Kaká 61' (pen.)	Report		Stadium: Santiago Bernabéu Stadium; Attendance: 67,244; Referee: Martin Hansson (Sweden)

21 October 2009 3	Zürich (Switzerland)	0–1	(France) Marseille	Zürich, Switzerland
20:45		Report	69' Heinze	Stadium: Letzigrund; Attendance: 22,300; Referee: Damir Skomina (Slovenia)

3 November 2009 4	Marseille (France)	6–1	(Switzerland) Zürich	Marseille, France
20:45	Aegerter 3' (o.g.); Abriel 11'; Niang 51'; Hilton 80'; Cheyrou 87'; Brandão 90'	Report	31' Alphonse	Stadium: Stade Vélodrome; Attendance: 56,282; Referee: Craig Thomson (Scotland)

25 November 2009 5	Milan (Italy)	1–1	(France) Marseille	Milan, Italy
20:45	Borriello 10'	Report	16' González	Stadium: San Siro; Attendance: 49,063; Referee: Howard Webb (England)

8 December 2009 6	Marseille (France)	1–3	(Spain) Real Madrid	Marseille, France
20:45	González 11'	Report	5', 80' Ronaldo; 60' Albiol	Stadium: Stade Vélodrome; Attendance: 55,722; Referee: Wolfgang Stark (Germany)

=== UEFA Europa League ===
Because of Marseille's third-place finish at the 2009–10 UEFA Champions League, they were relegated to the Europa League along with other third-place finishers. The draw for the Europa League was made on 18 December 2009, and Marseille went up against Danish champions Copenhagen. Marseille easily went past the Danish champions in the Europa league, but then they had a very hard task ahead of them coming up against the 2008–09 Primeira Liga third-place finishers Benfica. After their double 3–1 wins, Marseille were favourites to progress to the quarter-finals.

==== Round of 32 ====
18 February 2010 First leg	Copenhagen (Denmark)	1–3	(France) Marseille	Copenhagen, Denmark
21:05	Grønkjær 79' (pen.)	Report	72' Niang; 84' Ben Arfa; 90' Kaboré	Stadium: Parken Stadium; Attendance: 26,000; Referee: Carlos Velasco Carballo (Spain)

25 February 2010 Second leg	Marseille (France)	3–1 (6–2 agg.)	(Denmark) Copenhagen	Marseille, France
19:00	Ben Arfa 43'; Koné 62', 78'	Report	87' Aílton	Stadium: Stade Vélodrome; Attendance: 27,195; Referee: Cüneyt Çakır (Turkey)

==== Round of 16 ====
11 March 2010 First leg	Benfica (Portugal)	1–1	(France) Marseille	Lisbon, Portugal
21:05	M. Pereira 76'	Report	90' Ben Arfa	Stadium: Estádio da Luz; Attendance: 46,635; Referee: Felix Brych (Germany)

18 March 2010 Second leg	Marseille (France)	1–2 (2–3 agg.)	(Portugal) Benfica	Marseille, France
19:00	Niang 70'	Report	75' M. Pereira; 90+1' Alan Kardec	Stadium: Stade Vélodrome; Attendance: 38,386; Referee: Damir Skomina (Slovenia)

== National selection ==
The table shows the players selected to participate in National football matches for their countries. There were many International football competitions this season such as the 2010 FIFA World cup qualifications and other things such as the 2010 African Cup of Nations as well as international friendlies. Marseille have players who are often chosen to represent their countries in international football competitions and there are many who were chosen to represent their country in those competitions above.

Number	Nation	Name	Nationality	Selections	Goals
11	(Senegal)	Mamadou Niang	Senegal	2	2
3	(Nigeria)	Taye Taiwo	Nigeria	3	0

== Honours ==
=== Team ===
Ligue 1

- Winners

Coupe de la Ligue

- Winners

=== Individuals ===
Name	Number	Country	Award
Benoît Cheyrou	7	France	2009–10 Ligue 1 Team of the Year
Lucho González	8	Argentina	2009–10 Ligue 1 top passer
Lucho González	8	Argentina	UNFP Player of the Month (February 2010)
Mamadou Niang	9	Senegal	2009–10 Ligue 1 top goalscorer
Mamadou Niang	9	Senegal	2009 Senegalese Player of the Year
Mamadou Niang	9	Senegal	2009–10 Ligue 1 Team of the Year
Mamadou Niang	9	Senegal	2009–10 Ligue 1 Goal of the Year
Hatem Ben Arfa	10	France	UNFP Player of the Month (February 2010)
Fabrice Abriel	18	France	UNFP Player of the Month (November 2009)
Souleymane Diawara	21	Senegal	2009–10 Ligue 1 Team of the Year
