= Spinosi =

Spinosi is a surname. Notable people with the surname include:

- Jean-Christophe Spinosi (born 1964), French conductor and violinist
- Laurent Spinosi (born 1969), French goalkeeper and coach
- Luciano Spinosi (born 1950), Italian footballer and coach
- Mathieu Spinosi (born 1990), French actor
