= 2010 Coupe de la Ligue final =

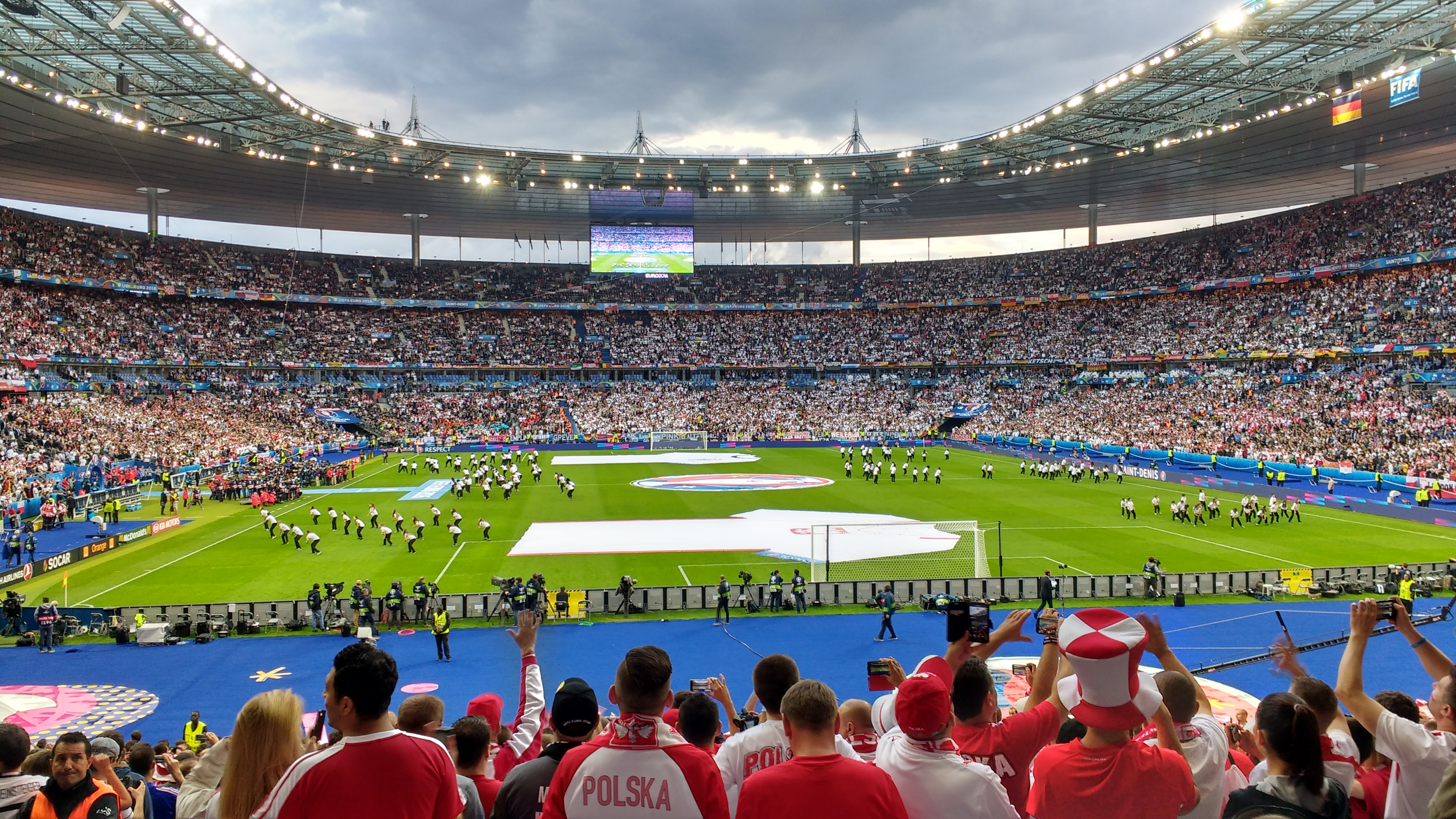
- Event: 2009–10 Coupe de la Ligue
Marseille	Bordeaux
Ligue 1	Ligue 1
3	1
- Date: 27 March 2010
- Venue: Stade de France, Saint-Denis
- Referee: Stéphane Lannoy (Nord-Pas-de-Calais)
- Attendance: 79,000
- Weather: 11 °C (52 °F), Mostly Cloudy

The 2010 Coupe de la Ligue final was the 16th final of France's football league cup competition, the Coupe de la Ligue, a football competition for the 46 teams that the Ligue de Football Professionnel manages. The final took place on 27 March 2010 at the Stade de France in Saint-Denis. The match was contested by Ligue 1 clubs Marseille and Bordeaux, who were the defending champions of the competition. The winner is guaranteed a UEFA Europa League place for the 2010–11 season with their appearance being dependent on whether they qualify for the 2010–11 UEFA Champions League. The final and both semi-finals were broadcast live on France 3.

Marseille claimed its first title since its 1992–93 UEFA Champions League triumph following a 3–1 victory over Bordeaux. The goals were scored by Souleymane Diawara, Mathieu Valbuena and Matthieu Chalmé, who converted an own goal; Ludovic Sané scored Bordeaux's lone goal. Because of its Ligue 1 title, Marseille claimed the league and league cup double. It became the second-straight season a club had won the league and league cup double, with finalists Bordeaux achieving it the previous season.

== Background ==
=== Team information ===
Marseille entered the final having last appeared in a final of a knockout competition at the 2006–07 edition of the Coupe de France when it lost to Sochaux on penalties. Marseille's appearance in the final marked its debut in the competition's final match. Prior to this appearance, the club's best finish in the competition was reaching the semi-finals during the 2002–03 season, where it lost 0–1 to Monaco, the eventual champions. At the time, Monaco was managed by Didier Deschamps, Marseille's current manager.

Bordeaux entered the competition as defending champions having defeated Ligue 2 club Vannes in the 2009 edition of the final by a score of 4–0. Bordeaux had won the competition a record three times. They share this honor with Paris Saint-Germain. This year's appearance marked Bordeaux's sixth appearance in the competition's final match, which also is a record. The Aquitaine-based outfit attempted to become the first club in the history of the competition to successfully defend their title.

In total, Bordeaux and Marseille contested one another 49 times in league play, with the latter having the advantage winning 27 matches. Bordeaux have accounted for 17 wins, while 5 were played to a draw. The clubs had never faced one another in the Coupe de la Ligue. The clubs' most recent meeting came during the 2009–10 Ligue 1 season. The first match was played on 30 August 2009 at the Stade Vélodrome. The highly anticipated match ended in a 0–0 draw and was played in front of 55,920 spectators, the highest attended match this season in Ligue 1. On 17 January 2010, the return match was played in Bordeaux; the match ended in 1–1 with Marseille goalkeeper Steve Mandanda scoring an own goal for Bordeaux during injury time of the first half and midfielder Benoît Cheyrou equalizing for Marseille nine minutes from time.

==== Injuries ====
Marseille entered the match without recent French international Benoît Cheyrou due to a calf injury. Fellow midfielders Bakari Koné and Fabrice Abriel were questionable for the match with the former likely to make the bench, while the latter would not. Argentine international Gabriel Heinze returned to the team after having miss three weeks due to a stress fracture in his right fibula.

Bordeaux was without vice-captain and centre-back Marc Planus due to a knee injury. The club was also without France under-21 international Grégory Sertic, who will miss a month after breaking a toe on his right foot in the club's match against Lille held the previous weekend, as well as midfielder Abdou Traoré, who is out with a hamstring injury.

=== Ticketing ===
The Coupe de la Ligue final has been played every year at the Stade de France since 1998, following the stadium's completion. The stadium has a capacity of 81,338 spectators. Each club that participated in the final received the same quota of tickets, which were distributed to season ticket holders and through their ticket sales at a later date. Tickets went on sale to the general public on 17 March, ten days before the final. Pricing was defined by category with Category 1 seats, the highest category, being priced at €90 and Category 4, the lowest, going for €45.

=== Officials ===
On 11 March, the Ligue de Football Professionnel (LFP) announced that referee Stéphane Lannoy of Nord-Pas-de-Calais would officiate the 2010 Coupe de la Ligue final. Lannoy was pre-selected by FIFA to officiate at the 2010 FIFA World Cup and officiated his first Coupe de la Ligue final. His assistants were Éric Dansault of Centre and Laurent Ugo of the Méditerranée, with Philippe Kalt of Alsace serving as the fourth official.

=== Match balls ===
The Coupe de la Ligue final used match balls designed specifically for the Coupe de la Ligue. The "Tenor" by German football equipment manufacturer Uhlsport, the official provider of match balls in the Coupe de la Ligue, was created to emulate the Coupe de la Ligue trophy by including the cup's legendary golden spirals.

=== Rumored move ===
On 1 March 2010, it was revealed that the French government was considering moving the final to another venue in response to the fan violence that occurred during the annual Le Classique match in which the supporters of both Paris Saint-Germain and Marseille clashed resulting in a supporter being hospitalized, going into a coma, and later dying due to severe head injuries. PSG supporters also attacked law enforcement who were at the match to provide security, which resulted in the arrest of over 20 PSG supporters with 16 of them being detained and banned from attending football matches in the country. In response to the news, PSG president Robin Leproux suspended ticket sales to the club's supporters for away matches. The resulting news led to the government to consider relocating the Coupe de la Ligue final to the Stade Gerland in Lyon in order to ensure the safety of Marseille and Bordeaux supporters with fear that they would be harmed by PSG's extremist supporters in retribution if the match remained in Paris. On 3 March 2010, the LFP confirmed that the match would remain at the Stade de France.

== Route to the final ==
Note: In all results below, the score of the finalist is given first (H: home; A: away).

Marseille		Round	Bordeaux	
Opponent	Result	2009–10 Coupe de la Ligue	Opponent	Result
Saint-Étienne (A)	3–2	Round of 16	Le Mans (A)	3–2
Lille (H)	2–1	Quarter-finals	Sedan (H)	1–0
Toulouse (A)	2–1 (a.e.t.)	Semi-finals	Lorient (A)	4–1

== Match details ==
27 March 2010
20:50 CET

Marseille	3–1	Bordeaux
Diawara 61'; Valbuena 67'; Chalmé 77' (o.g.)	Report	Sané 83'

Stade de France, Saint-Denis
Attendance: 79,000
Referee: Stéphane Lannoy (Ligue Nord-Pas-de-Calais)

Marseille	Bordeaux

MARSEILLE:
GK	30	(France) Steve Mandanda
RB	24	(France) Laurent Bonnart
CB	21	(Senegal) Souleymane Diawara
CB	17	(Cameroon) Stéphane Mbia
LB	3	(Nigeria) Taye Taiwo
DM	6	(France) Édouard Cissé
CM	12	(Burkina Faso) Charles Kaboré
CM	8	(Argentina) Lucho González		(substituted off) 74'
RW	11	(Senegal) Mamadou Niang (c)		(substituted off) 51'
LW	10	(France) Hatem Ben Arfa		(substituted off) 86'
CF	9	(Brazil) Brandão	(yellow card) 18'
Substitutes:
GK	40	(Brazil) Elinton Andrade
DF	19	(Argentina) Gabriel Heinze		(substituted on) 86'
DF	5	(Brazil) Hilton
MF	18	(France) Fabrice Abriel		(substituted on) 74'
MF	14	(Ivory Coast) Bakari Koné
MF	28	(France) Mathieu Valbuena		(substituted on) 51'
FW	23	(Spain) Fernando Morientes
Manager:
(France) Didier Deschamps

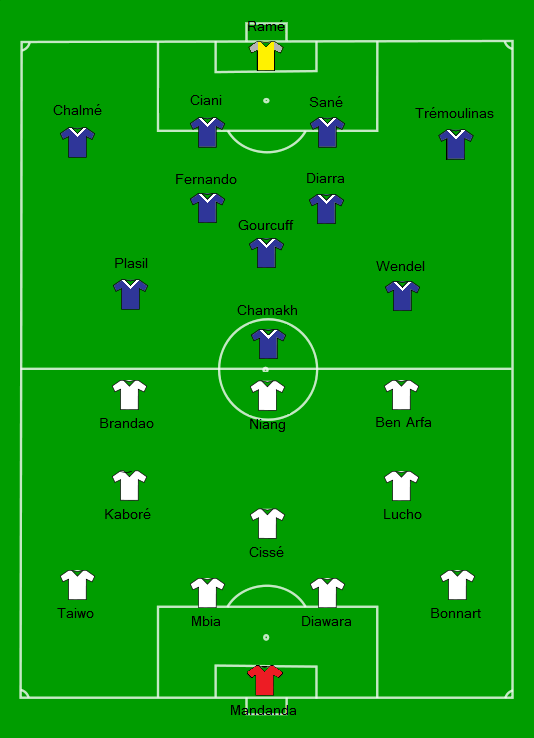

BORDEAUX:
GK	16	(France) Ulrich Ramé
RB	21	(France) Matthieu Chalmé
CB	25	(Senegal) Ludovic Sané	(yellow card) 11'
CB	2	(France) Michaël Ciani
LB	28	(France) Benoît Trémoulinas	(yellow card) 48'
DM	4	(France) Alou Diarra (c)	(yellow card) 16'
CM	5	(Brazil) Fernando		(substituted off) 67'
RW	18	(Czech Republic) Jaroslav Plašil
LW	17	(Brazil) Wendel
AM	8	(France) Yoann Gourcuff		(substituted off) 70'
CF	29	(Morocco) Marouane Chamakh		(substituted off) 70'
Substitutes:
GK	1	(France) Cédric Carrasso
DF	6	(France) Franck Jurietti
DF	3	(Brazil) Henrique
MF	7	(France) Yoan Gouffran		(substituted on) 70'
FW	11	(France) David Bellion
FW	10	(Brazil) Jussiê		(substituted on) 67'
FW	9	(Argentina) Fernando Cavenaghi		(substituted on) 70'
Manager:
(France) Laurent Blanc

MATCH OFFICIALS

- Assistant referees:
  - Éric Dansault (Ligue du Centre)
  - Laurent Ugo (Ligue de la Méditerranée)
- Fourth official: Philippe Kalt (Ligue d'Alsace)

MAN OF THE MATCH

MATCH RULES

- 90 minutes.
- 30 minutes of extra-time if necessary.
- Penalty shoot-out if scores still level.
- Seven named substitutes.
- Maximum of three substitutions.

== See also ==
- 2010 Coupe de France final
- 2009–10 FC Girondins de Bordeaux season
- 2009–10 Olympique de Marseille season
