= Charles Kaboré =

Burkinabé footballer (born 1988)

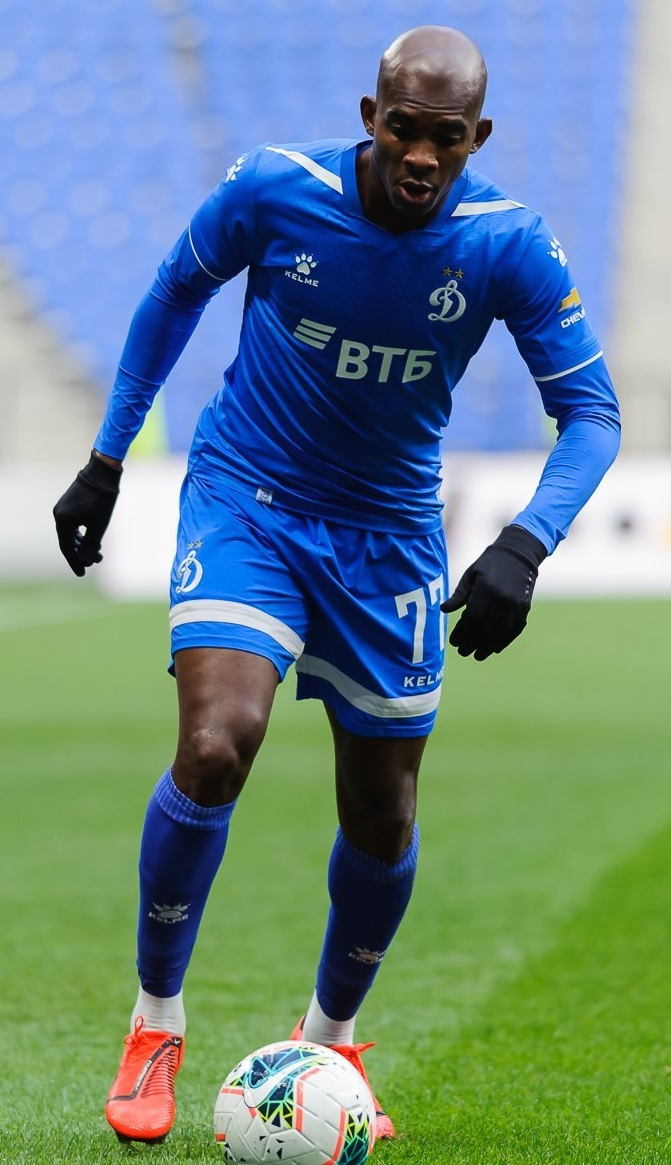
- Kaboré with Dynamo Moscow in 2019

Personal information
- Date of birth: 9 February 1988 (age 38)
- Place of birth: Bobo-Dioulasso, Burkina Faso
- Height: 1.83 m (6 ft 0 in)
- Position: Midfielder

Youth career
- 2003–2004: SONABEL
- 2004–2006: EF Ouagadougou

Senior career*
Years	Team	Apps	(Gls)
2006–2008	Libourne Saint Seurin	26	(1)
2008	→ Marseille (loan)	12	(0)
2008–2013	Marseille	124	(2)
2013–2016	Kuban Krasnodar	63	(0)
2015–2016	→ Krasnodar (loan)	21	(0)
2016–2019	Krasnodar	65	(2)
2019–2021	Dynamo Moscow	39	(0)
2022–2023	Niort	30	(0)

International career
2006–2021	Burkina Faso	102	(4)
Medal record
Representing Burkina Faso
Africa Cup of Nations
Runner-up	2013 South Africa
Third place	2017 Gabon
- * Club domestic league appearances and goals

Charles Kaboré (born 9 February 1988) is a Burkinabé former professional footballer who played as a defensive midfielder. A Burkina Faso international from 2006 to 2021, he is the country's most capped player.

== Club career ==
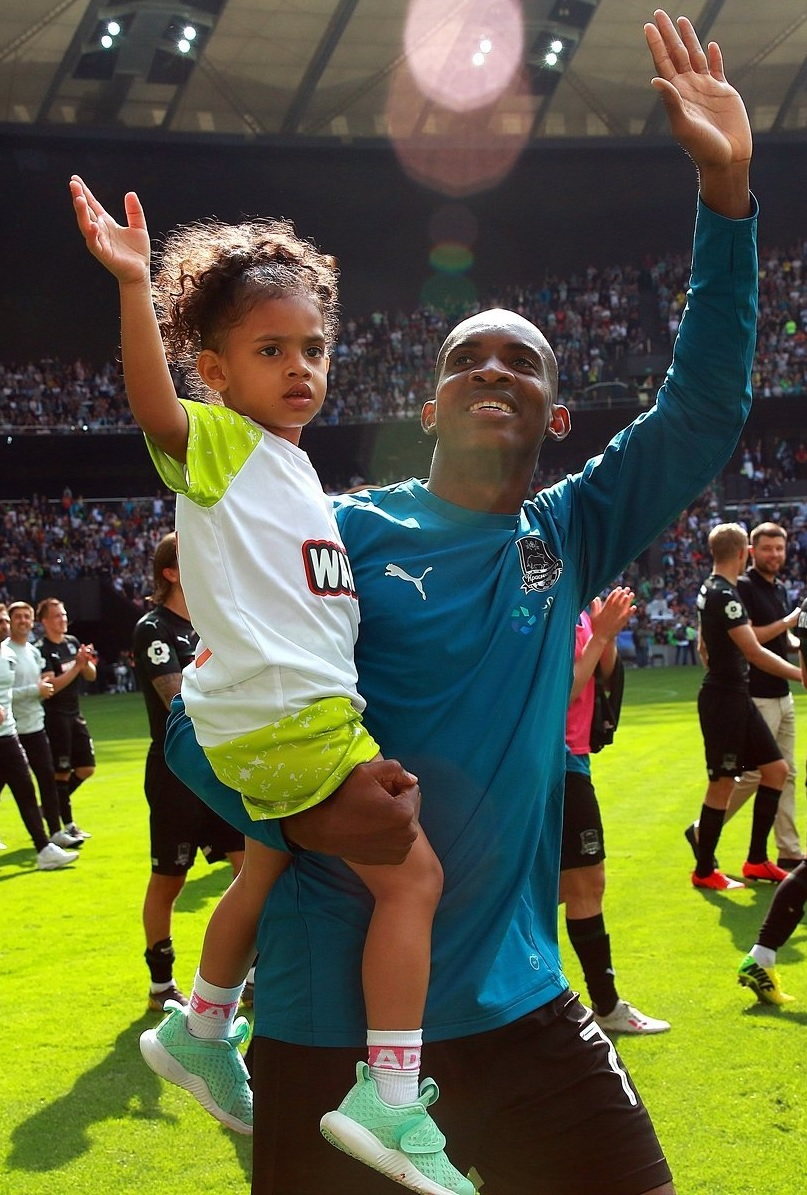
Kaboré with his daughter after his last game for FC Krasnodar in 2019

Kaboré played for the youth side of Association Sportive SONABEL and Etoile Filante Ouagadougou. In 2006, after two years with Etoile Filante Ouagadougou he was scouted from Libourne-Saint-Seurin.

In January 2008, he was signed by Olympique de Marseille from Libourne-Saint-Seurin.

He acquired French nationality by naturalization in August 2010.

In January 2013, he signed for Kuban Krasnodar of the Russian Premier League.

On 25 August 2015, he signed for another Russian team, FC Krasnodar on loan with a buyout option. On 20 June 2016, FC Krasnodar bought his rights from Kuban and he signed a contract with them until 2019.

On 20 May 2019, FC Krasnodar confirmed that Kaboré will leave the club after his contract expires at the end of the 2018–19 season.

On 17 July 2019, he signed a two-year contract with Russian club FC Dynamo Moscow.

On 3 June 2022, Kaboré joined Ligue 2 side Niort.

== International career ==
Kaboré made his international debut for Burkina Faso on 7 October 2006 in their 1–0 win against Senegal. On 24 March 2021, he played his 100th match for Burkina Faso in a goalless draw against Uganda during the 2021 Africa Cup of Nations qualification.

== Career statistics ==
=== Club ===
As of match played 16 May 2021

Appearances and goals by club, season and competition
Club	Season	League			National Cup		League Cup		Continental		Other		Total	
Club	Season	Division	Apps	Goals	Apps	Goals	Apps	Goals	Apps	Goals	Apps	Goals	Apps	Goals
Libourne Saint Seurin	2006–07	Ligue 2	10	1	0	0	0	0	-		-		10	1
Libourne Saint Seurin	2007–08	Ligue 2	16	0	0	0	1	0	-		-		17	0
Libourne Saint Seurin	Total		26	1	0	0	1	0	0	0	0	0	27	1
Marseille (loan)	2007–08	Ligue 1	12	0	2	0	1	0	–		0	0	15	0
Marseille	2008–09	Ligue 1	23	1	1	0	1	0	6	0	-		31	1
Marseille	2009–10	Ligue 1	25	1	1	1	3	0	6	1	-		35	3
Marseille	2010–11	Ligue 1	34	0	0	0	4	0	5	0	1	0	44	0
Marseille	2011–12	Ligue 1	25	0	3	0	3	0	6	0	1	0	38	0
Marseille	2012–13	Ligue 1	17	0	1	0	1	0	8	0	-		27	0
Marseille	Total		124	2	6	1	12	0	31	1	2	0	175	4
Kuban Krasnodar	2012–13	Russian Premier League	11	0	1	0	–		–		–		12	0
Kuban Krasnodar	2013–14	Russian Premier League	26	0	0	0	–		9	1	–		35	1
Kuban Krasnodar	2014–15	Russian Premier League	26	0	5	0	–		–		–		31	0
Kuban Krasnodar	2015–16	Russian Premier League	0	0	0	0	–		–		–		0	0
Kuban Krasnodar	Total		63	0	6	0	0	0	9	1	0	0	78	1
Krasnodar (loan)	2015–16	Russian Premier League	21	0	4	0	–		7	0	–		32	0
Krasnodar	2016–17	Russian Premier League	22	1	1	0	–		10	0	–		33	1
Krasnodar	2017–18	Russian Premier League	19	0	1	0	–		2	0	–		22	0
Krasnodar	2018–19	Russian Premier League	24	1	4	0	–		9	0	–		37	1
Krasnodar	Total		65	2	6	0	0	0	21	0	0	0	92	2
Dynamo Moscow	2019–20	Russian Premier League	20	0	1	0	–		–		–		21	0
Dynamo Moscow	2020–21	Russian Premier League	19	0	1	0	–		1	0	–		21	0
Dynamo Moscow	Total		39	0	2	0	0	0	1	0	0	0	42	0
Career total			350	5	26	1	14	0	69	2	2	0	461	8

=== International ===
Scores and results list Burkina Faso's goal tally first, score column indicates score after each Kaboré goal.

List of international goals scored by Charles Kaboré
No.	Date	Venue	Opponent	Score	Result	Competition
1	29 May 2007	Harare, Zimbabwe	Zimbabwe	1–1	1–1	Friendly
2	21 June 2008	Ouagadougou, Burkina Faso	Seychelles	1–0	4–1	2010 FIFA World Cup qualification
3	9 October 2010	Ouagadougou, Burkina Faso	Gambia	3–0	3–1	2012 Africa Cup of Nations qualification
4	23 March 2013	Ouagadougou, Burkina Faso	Niger	4–0	4–0	2014 FIFA World Cup qualification

== Honours ==
Marseille

- Ligue 1: 2009–10
- Coupe de la Ligue: 2009–10, 2010–11, 2011–12
- Trophée des Champions: 2010, 2011

Kuban Krasnodar

- Russian Cup runner-up: 2015

Burkina Faso

- Africa Cup of Nations runner-up: 2013

== See also ==
- List of men's footballers with 100 or more international caps
