= Stéphane Mbia =

Cameroonian footballer (born 1986)

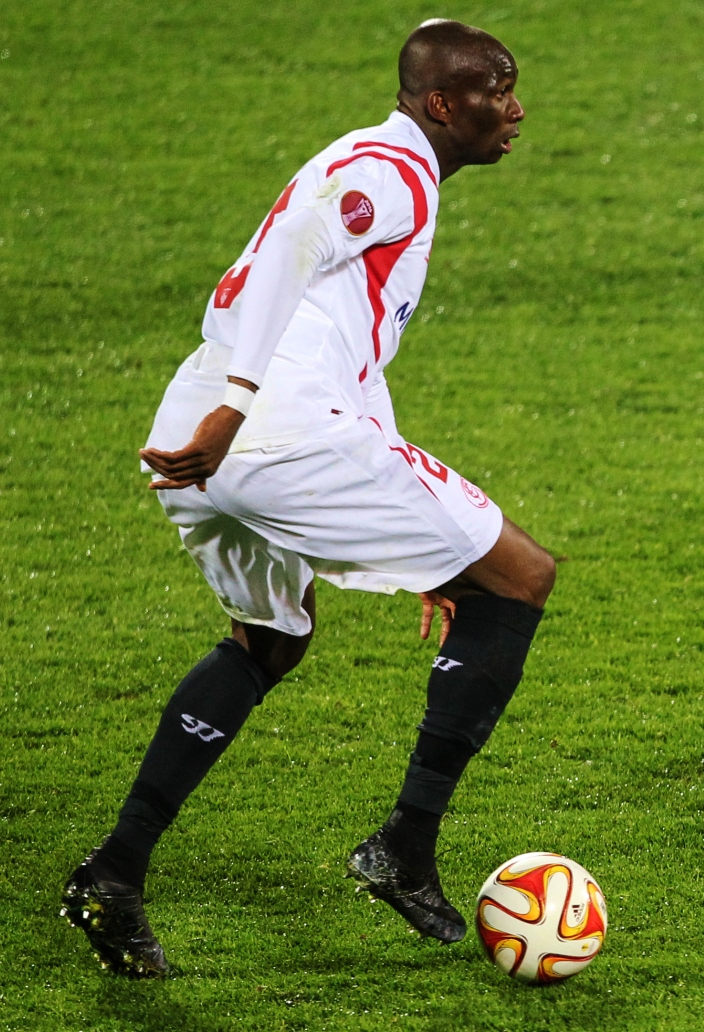
- Mbia playing for Sevilla in 2015

Personal information
- Full name: Stéphane Mbia Etoundi
- Date of birth: 20 May 1986 (age 40)
- Place of birth: Yaoundé, Cameroon
- Height: 1.90 m (6 ft 3 in)
- Positions: Defensive midfielder; defender

Youth career
- 2003–2004: Kadji Sports Academy
- 2004: Rennes

Senior career*
Years	Team	Apps	(Gls)
2004–2009	Rennes	105	(4)
2009–2012	Marseille	69	(5)
2012–2014	Queens Park Rangers	29	(0)
2013–2014	→ Sevilla (loan)	20	(3)
2014–2015	Sevilla	23	(4)
2015–2016	Trabzonspor	17	(2)
2016–2018	Hebei China Fortune	39	(9)
2018–2019	Toulouse	5	(0)
2019	Wuhan Zall	24	(0)
2020–2021	Shanghai Shenhua	12	(0)
2021	Wuhan FC	5	(1)
2021–2022	Fuenlabrada	10	(0)
2022	Tuzlaspor	0	(0)
2024	Châteauroux	8	(0)
Total		366	(28)

International career
2005–2016	Cameroon	68	(5)
Medal record
Men's football
Representing Cameroon
Africa Cup of Nations
Runner-up	2008 Ghana
- * Club domestic league appearances and goals

Stéphane Mbia Etoundi (born 20 May 1986) is a Cameroonian former professional footballer who played as a defensive midfielder or defender.

He played 179 games and scored nine goals in Ligue 1 over nine seasons playing for Rennes, Marseille and Toulouse. He spent two years at Sevilla, winning the Europa League in both. He also played for Cameroon 68 times from 2005 to 2016 and scored five goals for the national team. He was included in the squads for the 2008 Olympics, two Africa Cup of Nations tournaments and two FIFA World Cups.

== Club career ==
=== Rennes ===
Born in Yaoundé, Mbia made his debut for the Rennes first team during the 2005–06 season, going on to make a handful of appearances over the campaign. The Cameroonian scored his first Ligue 1 goal in November 2006 against the incumbent French champions Lyon.

On 18 April 2007, Mbia was abused by Lyon player Milan Baroš. This led to disciplinary action being taken against Baroš by the French Football Federation, who banned the striker for three matches.

=== Marseille ===
On 14 July 2009, Mbia completed his £10.4 million move to Marseille from Rennes, going on to play a vital role in Marseille's victorious Ligue 1 campaign that season, starting off as a defensive midfielder but later making the transition to the role of centre back alongside former Charlton Athletic player Souleymane Diawara. His redeployment at centre back was a success and he went on to play the rest of the season in this position, where he was considered to be one of the best performers in Didier Deschamps' talented squad, as he formed a formidable defensive partnership with Diawara.

=== Queens Park Rangers ===
On 31 August 2012 Mbia signed a two-year deal with English Premier League club Queens Park Rangers, signing for an undisclosed fee, with Joey Barton heading in the opposite direction on a season-long loan.

On 27 October 2012, Mbia was sent off seventeen minutes from the end of only his fourth league appearance for QPR, a 1–0 defeat to Arsenal at the Emirates Stadium. He was dismissed in the 79th minute for violent conduct after kicking Gunners defender Thomas Vermaelen in retaliation to a strong challenge that had left Mbia floored. He received the standard three-match ban from the FA, and became ineligible for QPR's league games against Reading, Stoke City and Southampton. On 6 May 2013, Mbia tweeted to Joey Barton, asking him if he would like to switch seats with him at Marseille in hinting that he wanted to leave Queen Park Rangers after they were relegated from the Premier League. In July 2013 Mbia scored his first goal for the club in a pre-season friendly against Southend United and expressed desire to stay at QPR.

=== Sevilla ===
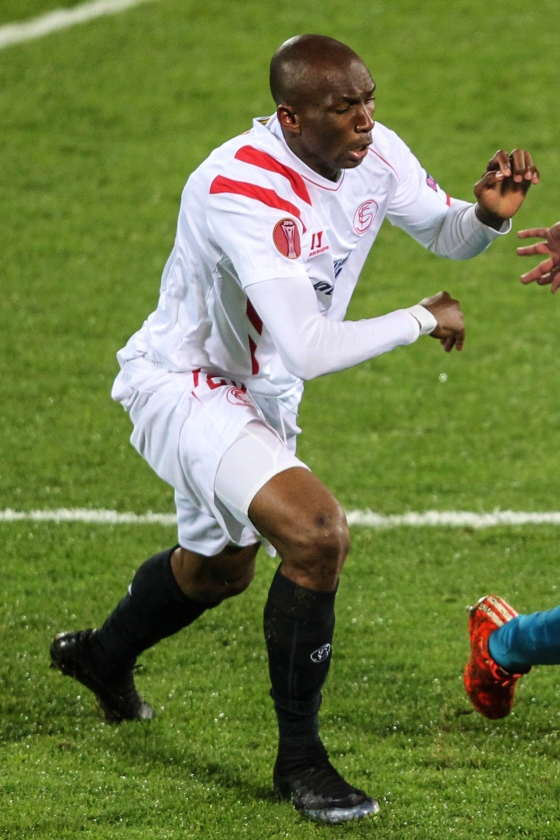
Mbia playing for Sevilla against Zenit in 2015

On 26 August 2013, Mbia was loaned out to Spanish La Liga club Sevilla for the rest of the season. Mbia made his Sevilla debut on 1 September, providing an assist for Kevin Gameiro's first goal in a 2–2 draw with Málaga. On 27 October, Mbia provided assists for both Ivan Rakitić and Jairo Samperio as Sevilla overcame 10-man Osasuna 2–1. His first goal in La Liga came in the Seville derby against Real Betis on 24 November, heading in Sevilla's second goal in a 4–0 win.

Mbia scored with a back-heel in the first leg of their Europa League semi-final against compatriots Valencia on 24 April 2014 in a 2–0 home win. In the second leg on 1 May, he scored the winning away goal with a header in the fourth minute of added time to take Sevilla into the final. Sevilla subsequently won the final in a shootout against Benfica at the Juventus Stadium in Turin on 14 May, with Mbia converting his penalty kick after the match had ended 0—0. On 3 June, Mbia was selected in the 18-man Europa League "Team of the Year" along with teammates Ivan Rakitić, Nicolás Pareja and Beto. At the LFP Awards, he was a nominee for the league's best African player, alongside the Granada duo of Yacine Brahimi and Youssef El-Arabi.

On 31 August 2014, Mbia rejoined Sevilla on permanent basis. He scored his first goal of the new season on 18 September, heading in a cross from Gerard Deulofeu as Sevilla started the defense of their Europa League title with a 2–0 win over Feyenoord. Mbia netted a brace as Sevilla earned a comfortable 4–1 victory over Deportivo de La Coruña at the Ramon Sanchez Pizjuan stadium on 5 October.

On 27 May 2015, Mbia started for Sevilla in the 2015 UEFA Europa League Final defeat of Dnipro at Poland's National Stadium, thus retaining their Europa League crown, and qualifying the team for next season's Champions League

=== Later career ===
On 2 July 2015, Mbia joined Trabzonspor on a free transfer, signing a three-year deal.

On 29 January 2016, Mbia signed for Chinese Super League club Hebei China Fortune. In March 2018, he left the club by mutual consent.

In August 2018, Mbia joined Ligue 1 side Toulouse on a season-long contract. He left the club in January 2019.

On 3 February 2019, Mbia returned to China to join top-flight newcomers Wuhan Zall. A year later, he moved across the league to Shanghai Greenland Shenhua. He left after one season to re-join Wuhan Zall, now renamed Wuhan F.C., and reunited with his former Sevilla team-mate Daniel Carriço.

On 31 August 2021, Mbia returned to Spain after six years, and joined Fuenlabrada in the Segunda División on a one-year deal. On 21 January, he left the club after alleging "personal problems".

== International career ==
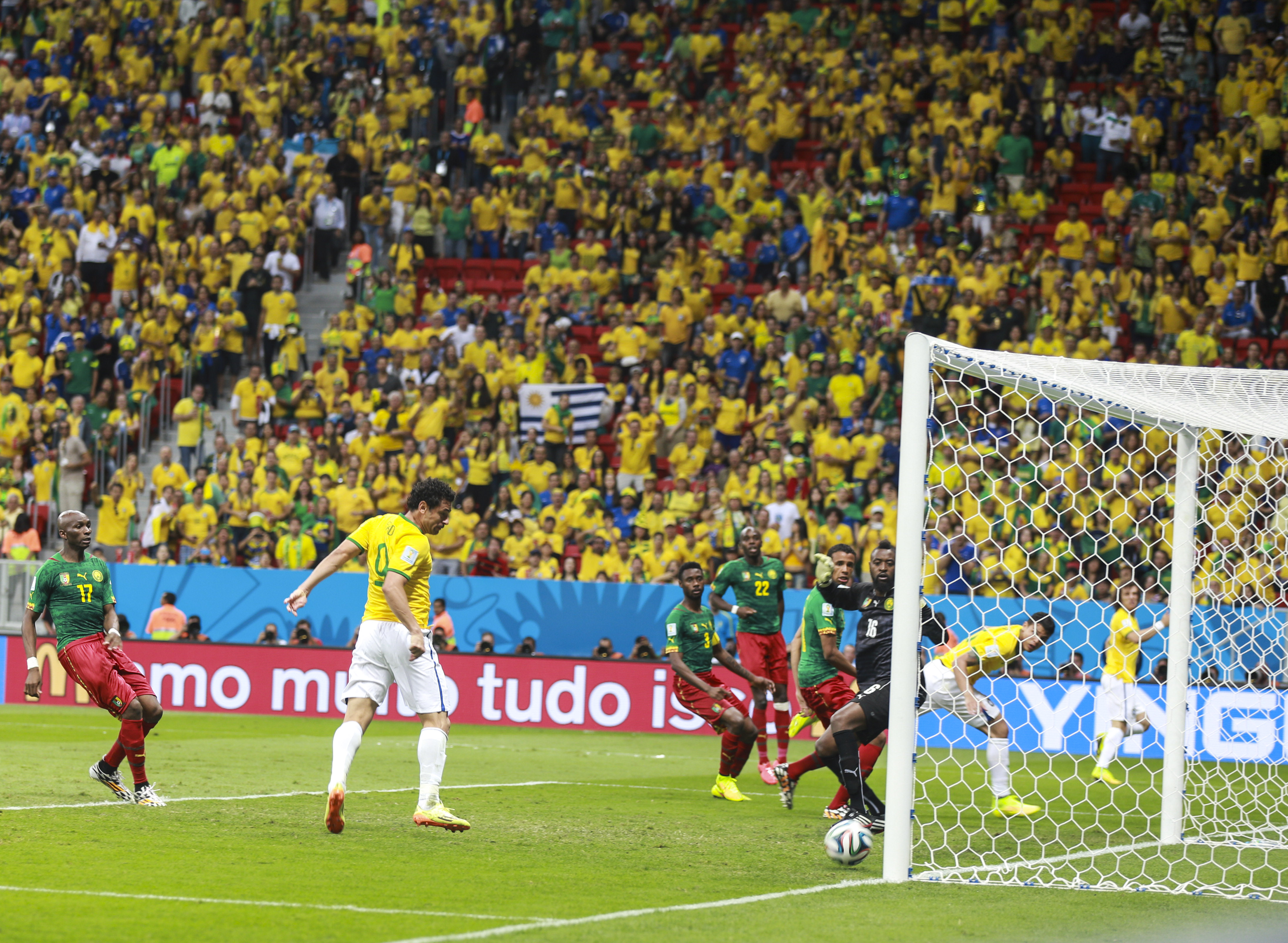
Fred scoring a goal for Brazil as Mbia (left) and goalkeeper Charles Itandje look on alongside their compatriots during a group stage match at the 2014 FIFA World Cup

Mbia has played international football at junior level for Cameroon. He was part of the Cameroon squad that competed in the 2003 FIFA U-17 World Championship in Finland, where his side were eliminated at the group stage.

He made his debut for the full Cameroon national team in 2005. He was part of the squad which were runners up at the 2008 Africa Cup of Nations in Ghana, where he scored twice in a 3–2 win against Tunisia in the quarter-finals.

Mbia was part of the Cameroon squad for the 2008 Olympics in China, playing in all four of his team's matches, and scoring once against Honduras. Mbia was also selected to represent Cameroon at the 2010 Africa Cup of Nations in Angola and the World Cup in South Africa.

On 2 June 2014, Mbia was included by Cameroon manager Volker Finke in the final 23-man squad for the World Cup in Brazil. The team were eliminated after losing all of their group games amidst a bonuses dispute that led to Mbia replacing Samuel Eto'o as captain of the national team.

== Personal life ==
Mbia is the older brother of footballer Franck Etoundi, who was also a Cameroonian international.

== Career statistics ==
=== Club ===
As of match played 12 September 2024

Appearances and goals by club, season and competition
Club	Season	League			National cup (Note: Includes Coupe de France, FA Cup, Copa del Rey, Chinese FA Cup)		League cup (Note: Includes Coupe de la Ligue, Football League Cup)		Continental		Other		Total	
Club	Season	Division	Apps	Goals	Apps	Goals	Apps	Goals	Apps	Goals	Apps	Goals	Apps	Goals
Rennes	2004–05	Ligue 1	1	0	1	0	1	0	—		—		3	0
Rennes	2005–06	Ligue 1	22	0	4	0	1	0	3 (Note: Appearances in UEFA Cup)	0	—		30	0
Rennes	2006–07	Ligue 1	30	1	0	0	2	0	—		—		32	1
Rennes	2007–08	Ligue 1	25	3	0	0	2	0	4	1	—		31	4
Rennes	2008–09	Ligue 1	27	0	5	1	1	0	2 (Note: Appearances in UEFA Intertoto Cup)	1	—		35	2
Rennes	Total		105	4	10	1	7	0	9	2	—		131	7
Marseille	2009–10	Ligue 1	27	2	1	0	2	0	7 (Note: Four appearances in UEFA Champions League, three appearances in UEFA Europa League)	0	—		37	2
Marseille	2010–11	Ligue 1	26	1	1	0	4	0	6 (Note: Appearances in UEFA Champions League)	0	1 (Note: Appearance in Trophée des champions)	0	38	1
Marseille	2011–12	Ligue 1	15	2	1	0	2	0	5	0	—		23	2
Marseille	2012–13	Ligue 1	1	0	—		—		3 (Note: Appearances in UEFA Europa League)	0	—		4	0
Marseille	Total		69	5	3	0	8	0	21	0	1	0	102	5
Queens Park Rangers	2012–13	Premier League	29	0	2	0	1	0	—		—		32	0
Sevilla (loan)	2013–14	La Liga	20	3	2	0	—		8	2	—		30	5
Sevilla	2014–15	La Liga	23	4	—		—		13	3	—		36	7
Trabzonspor	2015–16	Süper Lig	17	2	—		—		1	0	—		18	2
Hebei China Fortune	2016	Chinese Super League	26	6	1	1	—		—		—		27	7
Hebei China Fortune	2017	Chinese Super League	13	3	1	0	—		—		—		14	3
Hebei China Fortune	Total		39	9	2	1	—		—		—		41	10
Toulouse	2018–19	Ligue 1	5	0	0	0	0	0	—		—		5	0
Wuhan Zall	2019	Chinese Super League	24	0	0	0	—		—		—		24	0
Shanghai Shenhua	2020	Chinese Super League	12	0	1	0	—		5 (Note: Appearances in AFC Champions League)	0	—		18	0
Wuhan FC	2021	Chinese Super League	5	1	—		—		—		—		5	1
Fuenlabrada	2021–22	Segunda División	10	0	2	0	—		—		—		12	0
Tuzlaspor	2021–22	TFF First League	0	0	0	0	—		—		—		0	0
Châteauroux	2023–24	Championnat National	8	0	0	0	—		—		—		8	0
Career total			366	28	21	2	16	0	57	7	1	0	461	37

=== International ===
List of international goals scored by Stéphane Mbia
#	Date	Venue	Opponent	Score	Result	Competition
1.	3 June 2007	Antoinette Tubman Stadium, Monrovia, Liberia	Liberia	0 – 1	1 – 2	2008 Africa Cup of Nations qualification
2.	4 February 2008	Tamale Stadium, Tamale, Ghana	Tunisia	0 – 1	2 – 3	2008 Africa Cup of Nations – Quarter-finals
3.	4 February 2008	Tamale Stadium, Tamale, Ghana	Tunisia	2 – 3	2 – 3	2008 Africa Cup of Nations – Quarter-finals
4.	15 October 2014	Ahmadou Ahidjo Stadium, Mefou-et-Afamba, Cameroon	Sierra Leone	2 – 0	2 – 0	2015 Africa Cup of Nations qualification
5.	13 November 2014	Stade Général Seyni Kountché, Niamey, Niger	Niger	0 – 1	0 – 3	2015 Africa Cup of Nations qualification

== Honours ==
Rennes

- UEFA Intertoto Cup: 2008

Marseille

- Ligue 1: 2009–10
- Coupe de la Ligue: 2009–10, 2010–11, 2011–12
- Trophée des Champions: 2011

Sevilla

- UEFA Europa League: 2013–14, 2014–15

Cameroon

- Africa Cup of Nations runner-up: 2008

Individual

- Africa Cup of Nations Team of the Tournament: 2008
- CAF Team of the Year: 2014
- UEFA Europa League Squad of the season: 2013–14, 2014–15
