= Mathieu Valbuena =

French footballer (born 1984)

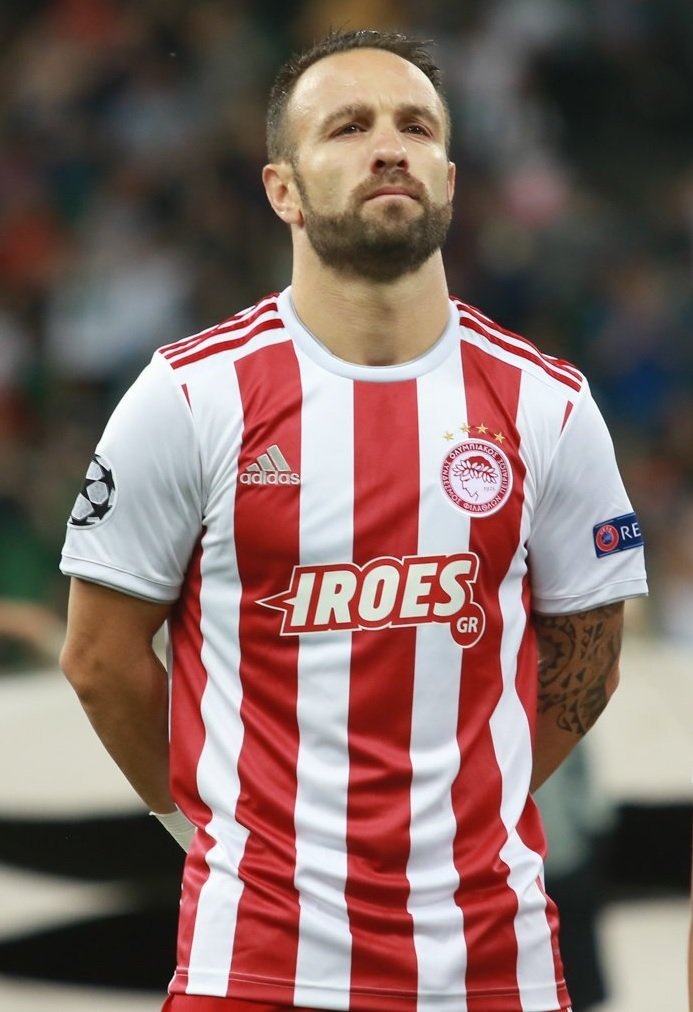
- Valbuena with Olympiacos in 2019

Personal information
- Full name: Mathieu Valbuena
- Date of birth: 28 September 1984 (age 42)
- Place of birth: Bruges, France
- Height: 1.67 m (5 ft 6 in)
- Positions: Attacking midfielder; wide midfielder

Team information
- Current team: St. Lucia
- Number: 28

Youth career
- 1990–2001: Blanquefort
- 2001–2003: Bordeaux
- 2003–2004: Langon-Castets

Senior career*
Years	Team	Apps	(Gls)
2004–2006	Libourne	55	(10)
2006–2014	Marseille	242	(27)
2014–2015	Dynamo Moscow	29	(6)
2015–2017	Lyon	56	(9)
2017–2019	Fenerbahçe	51	(10)
2019–2023	Olympiacos	98	(14)
2023–2024	Apollon Limassol	33	(7)
2024–2025	Athens Kallithea	32	(3)
2025–2026	Olympiacos B	10	(3)
2026–	St. Lucia	0	(0)

International career
2010–2015	France	52	(8)
- * Club domestic league appearances and goals as of 1 March 2026

Mathieu Valbuena (born 28 September 1984) is a French professional footballer who plays as an attacking midfielder for Maltese Challenge League club St. Lucia. He occasionally plays as a winger and is known for his pace, technical ability, and tenacious style of play. He is described by his former coach at Libourne Saint-Seurin, Didier Tholot, as "an explosive player who is capable of quickly taking two opponents out of the game to create space, above all due to his dribbling skills." Due to his small stature, Valbuena is nicknamed le petit vélo, which translates to "the little bike".

Valbuena began his career at professional club Bordeaux. He was let go from the club after two seasons and subsequently joined amateur club Langon-Castets in the fifth division of French football. In 2004, Valbuena joined Libourne Saint-Seurin in the Championnat National, the third level of French football. The midfielder had a good 2005–06 season with the club and signed with Ligue 1 club Marseille, prior to the 2006–07 season. With Marseille, Valbuena played in the UEFA Champions League for the first time and, in the 2009–10 season, was part of the team that won the league and league cup double, as well as the Trophée des Champions.

Valbuena is a French international and made his debut with the team in May 2010 in a friendly match against Costa Rica. He scored his first international goal in the same match and was named to the team to participate in the 2010 FIFA World Cup as a result. Valbuena appeared in only one of the three matches France contested at the World Cup. In November 2010, he scored his second career international goal against England at Wembley Stadium.

== Club career ==
=== Early career ===
Valbuena began his football career at hometown club ES Blanquefort. He developed an interest in the sport of football through his paternal heritage as he often attended matches at the Camp Nou in Barcelona during school holidays as a youth. At the age of nine, his football career was put on hold after he received over 50 stitches in one of his legs following a swimming accident. After the injury healed, Valbuena returned to football and quickly impressed club coaches. In 1998, he was given a Best Player award at a local youth tournament played at the Camp des Loges, the training center of professional club Paris Saint-Germain. In 2001, Valbuena was recruited by professional club FC Girondins de Bordeaux.

Valbuena spent two years playing on the club's under-18 team playing alongside the likes of Rio Mavuba and Marouane Chamakh. Valbuena appeared in only three matches with the reserve team before being released from the club after failing to impress Jean-Louis Garcia, the reserve team manager. It has been commonly stated that Valbuena was let go by the club due to his small size; however, former club player and trainer Philippe Lucas explained that Valbuena was let go because he struggled to "transform his game from that of a young player to that of a professional" and that "his game needed to be faster and he needed to avoid confrontations".

=== Amateur career ===
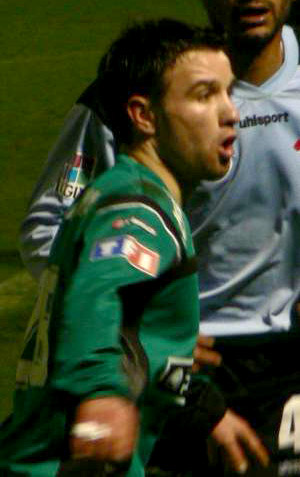
Valbuena with Libourne Saint-Seurin in 2006

After being let go by Bordeaux, Valbuena put his ambitions of becoming a professional player on hold, and was recommended by Garcia to play for amateur club Langan-Castets in the Championnat de France amateur 2, the fifth division of French football. Unlike at Bordeaux where he trained numerous times a week, Valbuena only trained three times a week with Langon-Castets and, due to the club's amateur status, worked as a sports shop salesman when he was not playing football. In his only season at the club, he impressed with his technical ability and was subsequently recruited by Championnat National club Libourne Saint-Seurin who had scouted the player eight times while he was at Langon-Castets.

While at Libourne Saint-Seurin, Valbuena's play went through an upgrade. In his first season at the club, he struggled for meaningful minutes under coach André Menot, playing in 20 league matches and scoring two goals. Menot was fired mid-season and was replaced by Didier Tholot. The club ultimately finished the season in 13th place in the league. In the next season, manager Tholot took immediate notice of Valbuena. Tholot described Valbuena as "the architect of the team" and sought to build the team around him. As a result, Valbuena's playing time improved dramatically. He played in 31 league matches and scored nine goals, all of which came in victories. Valbuena earned rave reviews for his performances, but still suffered criticism on occasion due to "wanting to do everything" as stated by Tholot. On 12 August 2005, he scored his first goal of the season in a 2–0 win over Moulins. Two weeks later, Valbuena scored a double in a 3–1 victory away to Cherbourg. One low-point during the season came on 9 September 2005 in Libourne's 2–1 defeat to Gazélec Ajaccio when Valbuena received his first-ever red card. The loss was the team's first of the season and Valbuena was suspended for three matches. Valbuena returned to the team on 7 October in a 1–0 loss to Bayonne.

In November 2005, Valbuena returned to his early season form after scoring four goals over the course of three matches. He scored his first goal of the month on 5 November in a 2–1 win at home against Nîmes. Two weeks later, Valbuena scored against Angers in another win and, in the following week, scored both goals in a 2–0 win over Pau. As a result of his performances, Valbuena was linked to several clubs in Ligue 1 and Ligue 2, most notably Saint-Étienne and Auxerre, in December. The midfielder, however, denied the approaches stating his desire to help Libourne achieve promotion to the second division. Valbuena went scoreless through the winter months, but remained a fixture in the starting eleven as the club remained in contention for promotion to Ligue 2. On 29 April 2006, with Libourne in a battle for the final promotion spot, Valbuena scored another double, this time against Toulon in another shutout victory. Libourne went unbeaten in its final four matches, which resulted in the club finishing in third place, thus achieving promotion to Ligue 2 for the first time in its history since the local clubs of Libourne and Saint-Seurin agreed to merge in 1998. For his efforts that season, Valbuena was named the league's Player of the Year, which led to heightened interest from several professional clubs in Ligue 2 and Ligue 1.

=== Marseille ===
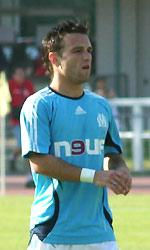
Valbuena at a training session in 2007

==== 2006–2010 ====
On 9 June 2006, Valbuena signed his first professional contract after agreeing to a transfer to Olympique de Marseille. He signed a three-year deal with the club and was assigned the number 28 shirt by manager Eric Gerets. Valbuena made his professional debut for the club on 15 July 2006 in the team's third round match against Ukrainian club Dnipro Dnipropetrovsk in the 2006 UEFA Intertoto Cup. He subsequently struggled to meet the demands of training and suffered an ankle injury in the pre-season period, which resulted in the player missing the start of the 2006–07 season. Valbuena made his league debut on 19 November 2006 in a league match against Valenciennes appearing as a substitute in the team's 1–0 victory. He appeared as a substitute for the majority of the season and even spent some time playing on the club's reserve team in the fifth division. On 19 May 2007, Valbuena scored his first professional goal in a 2–1 victory over Saint-Étienne. The game-winning goal allowed the club to maintain control of second place, which merited Marseille a spot in the UEFA Champions League for the first time since the 2003–04 season.

Following the departure of Franck Ribéry to German club Bayern Munich ahead of the 2007–08 season, Valbuena was inserted as his replacement. It is during this season the midfielder acquired the nickname le petit vélo (the small bike), which is a play on Valbuena's size and his parent club's stadium, the Stade Vélodrome. Valbuena started the season off healthy under Gerets and featured primarily as a substitute, but by late August 2007, had become a starter forming partnerships in the midfield with Samir Nasri, Lorik Cana, and Benoît Cheyrou. Valbuena made his UEFA Champions League debut on 18 September 2007 against Turkish club Beşiktaş appearing as a substitute in a 2–0 win. In the team's next group stage match against English club Liverpool at Anfield, Valbuena scored the only goal in a 1–0 victory. The victory over Liverpool was the first time a French club had ever won at Anfield. Later that month, Valbuena signed a contract extension with Marseille, committing himself to the club until June 2012.

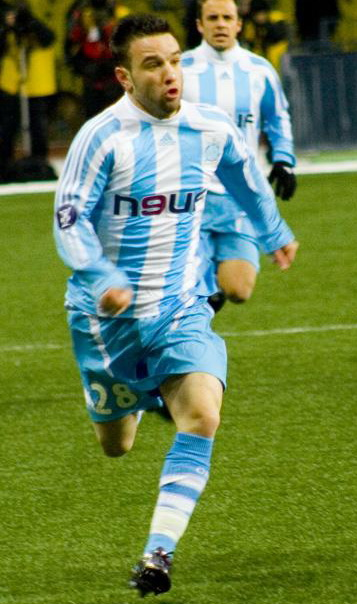
Valbuena playing for Marseille in 2008

In the league, Valbuena appeared in 29 matches and scored three goals. The first two goals came in the club's 6–1 win over Caen on 26 January 2008. The first goal Valbuena scored in the match was voted the Goal of the Year by the Ligue de Football Professionnel and was scored from almost 40 metres (44 yd) out. On 9 March, Valbuena, for the second straight season, scored the game-winning goal in a win over Saint-Étienne. Due to his promising performances, Marseille awarded him another contract extension in April 2008, which added an extra year to his contract.

In the 2008–09 season, Valbuena became a regular starter and appeared in 31 league matches. He scored three goals; two in victories over Auxerre and Le Havre and one in a loss to Paris Saint-Germain. After the season, Gerets, an admirer of Valbuena, was let go and Didier Deschamps was named as his replacement. In June 2009, Deschamps declared that Valbuena was not in his tactical plans and sought to place the midfielder on the transfer market. Club president Pape Diouf and several members of the board disagreed with Deschamps sentiments stating that Valbuena was "un-transferable". The indecision over Valbuena's future resulted in the player being linked to English clubs Aston Villa, Arsenal, and Liverpool. Valbuena's future was ultimately settled following the closure of the transfer window when he was not sold. As a result, he was relegated to the bench for the first half of the season under Deschamps and the tumultuous relationship reached its zenith in December when the two had a face-to-face meeting, which resulted in Valbuena declaring he wanted to leave the club in the January 2010 transfer window to find regular football.

On 17 October, Valbuena scored his first goal in his first league start of the season away to Nancy. In February 2010, Valbuena returned to the starting lineup and remained a starter for the rest of the season. He was an important part of the team that won the league and league cup double. In the Coupe de la Ligue, Valbuena scored the game-winning goal in the semi-finals against Lille. In the final, he scored the second goal in a 3–1 victory over his former club Bordeaux. The Coupe de la Ligue title was Marseille's first major honour since winning the UEFA Champions League in 1993. In April 2010, Valbuena scored goals in three straight matches, all wins, against Nice, Boulogne-sur-Mer, and Saint-Étienne. The victories helped Marseille maintain its first-place position and Valbuena was praised by Deschamps. Marseille ultimately won the league after defeating Rennes on 5 May 2010.

==== 2010–2014 ====
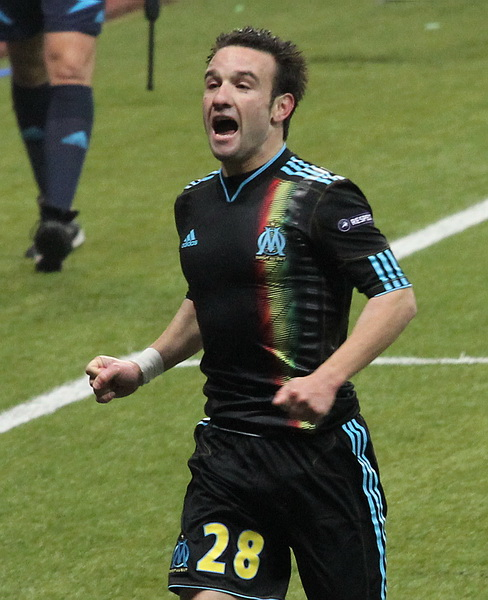
Valbuena celebrating a goal in 2010

In the 2010–11 season, Valbuena was inserted as a starter by Deschamps for the start of the campaign despite the arrivals of wingers Loïc Rémy and André Ayew. Valbuena was also hampered by the constant media inquiries about what happened at the 2010 FIFA World Cup, on which he has refused to comment, stating "I was a neophyte in the France team, I will not allow myself to discuss the events" and that he was "trying to forget" the incident. Valbuena scored his first goal of the season on 12 September 2010 in a 2–2 draw with Monaco. On 23 November, he scored the opening goal in the team's 3–0 win over Russian club FC Spartak Moscow in the Champions League. The victory resulted in Marseille qualifying for the knockout portion of the competition for the first time since 2000. Four days later, Valbuena scored the third goal in the team's 4–0 win over Montpellier. On 22 January, Valbuena suffered a medial ligament sprain in his left knee as a result of a tackle from Ayew during a training session. He was, initially, ruled out for up to six weeks, but returned to training ahead of the team's Champions League match against English club Manchester United on 22 February. Valbuena made his return to the team in the second leg at Old Trafford appearing as a second-half substitute. Marseille were defeated 2–1 away, which resulted in the club losing on aggregate by the same scoreline.

After appearing as a substitute in two consecutive league matches after returning from injury, Valbuena made his first start in a 2–1 win over Le Classique rivals Paris Saint-Germain. On 23 April 2011, he made his second consecutive start in the final of the Coupe de la Ligue. Marseille won the match defeating Montpellier 1–0 to claim its second straight league cup title. On 1 May, Valbuena scored the team's lone goal in its 1–1 draw with Auxerre. He finished the campaign by appearing in the team's final five matches as Marseille finished runner-up to Lille in the league.

Valbuena got off to a quick start in the team's 2011–12 campaign. He opened the campaign by assisting on a Loïc Rémy goal in the opening match of the season against Sochaux. The following week, he assisted on both goals in a 2–2 draw with Auxerre. On 28 August, Valbuena scored both of Marseille's goal in a 3–2 defeat away to Lille. The following month, he manufactured another statistical output after assisting on both of Rémy's goals in a 2–0 win over Evian. In the club's Champions League campaign, Valbuena failed to chart statistically in the team's first five group stage matches. On 6 December, in the team's final group stage match against German club Borussia Dortmund, Valbuena scored the match-winning goal after appearing as a substitute 14 minutes prior. The goal, described by UEFA as "an unstoppable shot", allowed Marseille progression to the UEFA Champions League knockout phase. In the team's final two December league matches prior to the winter break against Lorient and Nancy, Valbuena scored a goal and assisted on another in each match; Marseille won both matches. He finished the fall season with nine assists, a tally that currently leads the league.

Following his departure to Dynamo Moscow, Olympique de Marseille honoured Valbuena by retiring his number 28 shirt on 5 August 2014.

=== Dynamo Moscow ===
On 2 August 2014, Valbuena signed a three-year contract with Dynamo Moscow in a reported £6 million transfer. In his second game for Dynamo and first as a starter on 13 August 2014 against FC Ufa, he assisted on both of his team's goals in a 2-0 victory. In his next game against FC Arsenal Tula on 17 August 2014, he again assisted on both goals in Dynamo's 2-1 victory. On 28 August 2014, Dynamo defeated AC Omonia in the 2014–15 UEFA Europa League play-off round, through a decisive goal by Christopher Samba in the 93rd minute of the return leg following a free kick performed by Valbuena, and qualified for the first time for the group stage of a European competition (since the group stage was introduced). On 31 August 2014, he scored his first goal for Dynamo in a 2-0 victory over FC Krasnodar. On 16 September 2014, he had to undergo an emergency appendectomy. He returned to playing on 2 October 2014 in a Europa League group game against PSV Eindhoven, in which Yuri Zhirkov scored a winning goal deep into injury time after a corner delivered by Valbuena.

=== Olympique Lyonnais ===
On 11 August 2015, Valbuena returned to Ligue 1, signing a three-year contract with former club Marseille's rivals Lyon for a reported fee of €5 million.

=== Fenerbahçe ===
On 13 June 2017, Valbuena was signed by Fenerbahçe for a €1.5 million transfer fee (plus €1 million bonus) for three seasons.

=== Olympiacos ===
On 27 May 2019, Valbuena signed a one-year contract with Greek Super League club Olympiacos. His first goal for the club, a penalty in a 2–0 win over Başakşehir, helped Olympiacos progress to the UEFA Champions League play-offs. His penalty was the only goal of their second match of the 2019–20 Super League, away to AEL. After Olympiacos went two goals down at home to Tottenham Hotspur in their first match of the Champions League group stage, Daniel Podence scored just before half-time with Valbuena's assistance and soon after the break, Jan Vertonghen fouled Valbuena for a penalty which he himself converted to complete the comeback.

On 6 March 2020, Valbuena has extended his contract with Olympiacos until the summer of 2021. On 23 September 2020, Mathieu Valbuena's penalty gave the Greek champions a 2-0 home 2020–21 UEFA Champions League play-offs 1st leg win against Omonia. On 29 March 2021, as he reached the end of his contract at the end of the season, Valbuena reached an agreement to extend his contract with Olympiakos for another year for an undisclosed fee. On 28 November 2021, Valbuena scored his first goal for the season, with an excellent foul outside the area in the 90th minute, sealing a vital 2-1 home win game against Volos F.C. in its club effort to win the championship. He was voted MVP of the game. On 2 March 2022, he came as a substitute in the beginning of the second half, playing a catalytic role in a final 5-1 home win game against Asteras Tripolis He was voted MVP of the game.

=== Apollon Limassol ===
On 23 July 2023, Valbuena signed a one-year contract with Cypriot First Division club Apollon Limassol.

=== Athens Kallithea FC ===
On 5 August 2024, Valbuena joined Athens Kallithea FC. He later left the next year.

=== Olympiacos B ===
In 2025, Valbuena joined the second team of Olympiacos, returning to the club.

=== St. Lucia ===
In July 2026, Valbuena joined Maltese Challenge League side St. Lucia.

== International career ==
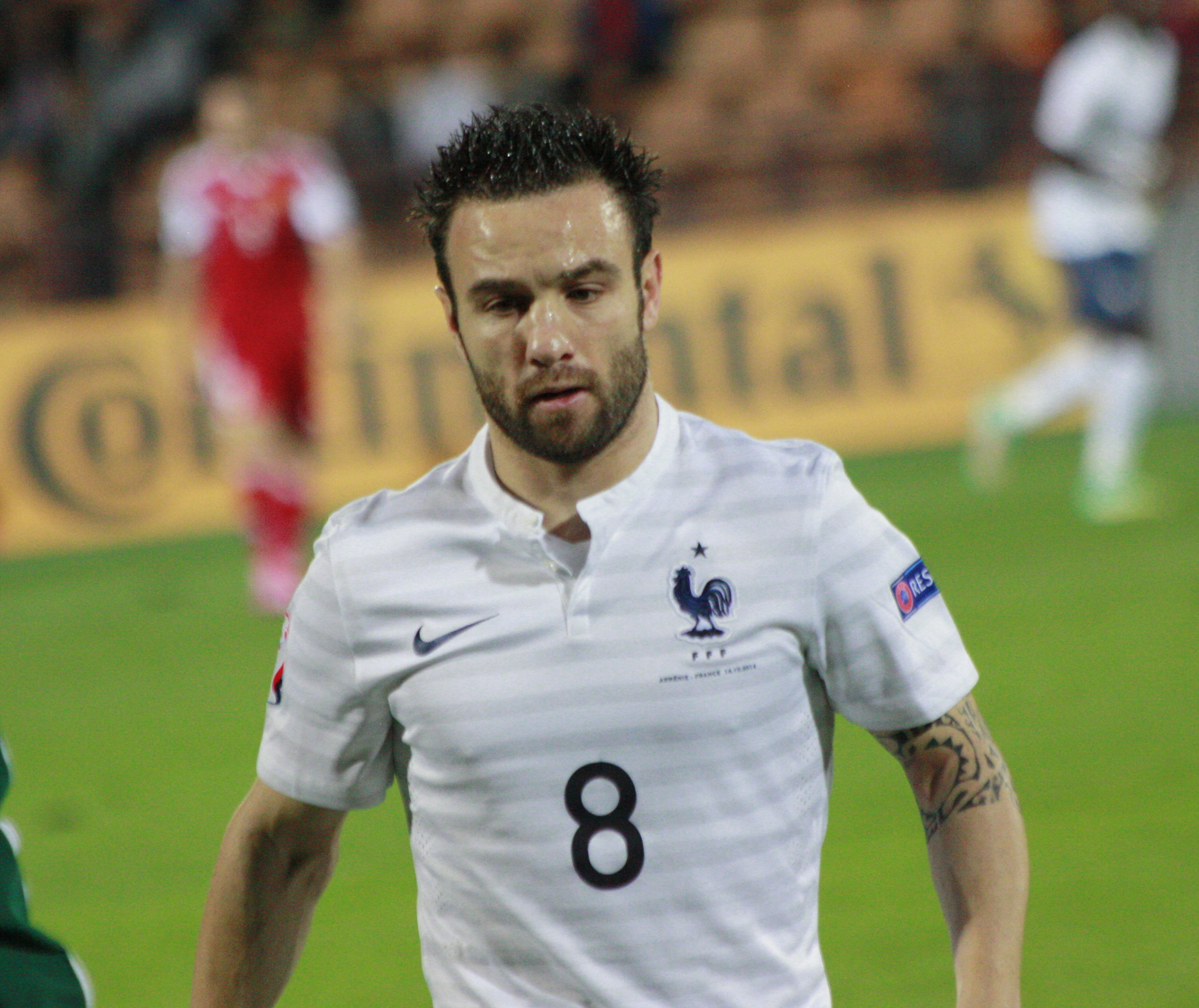
Valbuena playing for France in 2014.

Valbuena did not receive any call-ups to any of the France national youth football teams. However, following his impressive performances with Marseille, he was awarded a call up to the senior team by coach Raymond Domenech for the team's matches against England and Mali in March 2008. However, he picked up an injury and was forced to miss out.

Valbuena's next call-up was over two years later in May 2010, when he was named to the 30-man preliminary list by Domenech to play in the 2010 FIFA World Cup. Valbuena's call up was considered surprising by the media and the player himself, despite Valbuena playing well with his parent club who won the league and league cup double in the 2009–10 season. Many journalists in the French media compared Valbuena's call-up to the team with Franck Ribéry's call-up four years previously, as the two players share similarities in playing style and their circumstances at the time of their respective call-ups. Valbuena was later named to the 23-man team to compete in the competition. He made his national team debut on 26 May 2010 in a friendly match against Costa Rica appearing as a substitute in the second half. After 16 minutes on the field, Valbuena scored the game-winning goal in the team's 2–1 victory. At the World Cup, Valbuena made his debut in the competition in the team's 2–0 loss to Mexico appearing as a substitute on 17 June. It was his only appearance in the competition. During the competition, the players went on strike in protest over the expulsion of striker Nicolas Anelka from the team, which resulted in all 23 players on the team being suspended for its friendly match in August 2010.

After missing the match against Norway due to new manager Laurent Blanc's imposed suspension, Valbuena made his return to the team in a 1–0 defeat to Belarus in UEFA Euro 2012 qualification. The midfielder subsequently appeared in every match under Blanc in 2010, excluding the match against Bosnia and Herzegovina in September 2010. Valbuena capped his return to the national team by scoring against England in a friendly at Wembley Stadium on 17 November 2010.

Valbuena was included in France's UEFA Euro 2012 squad but did not make an appearance during the competition. Under new coach Didier Deschamps, Valbuena played in all ten of the team's matches during 2014 FIFA World Cup qualification, scoring once against Georgia.

On 13 May 2014, Valbuena was named in France's squad for the 2014 FIFA World Cup. He was named in the starting line-up for the team's opening match against Honduras, making his tournament debut. In the second group fixture, he scored in a 5–2 defeat of Switzerland to help Les Bleus qualify for the knockout stage.

== Style of play ==
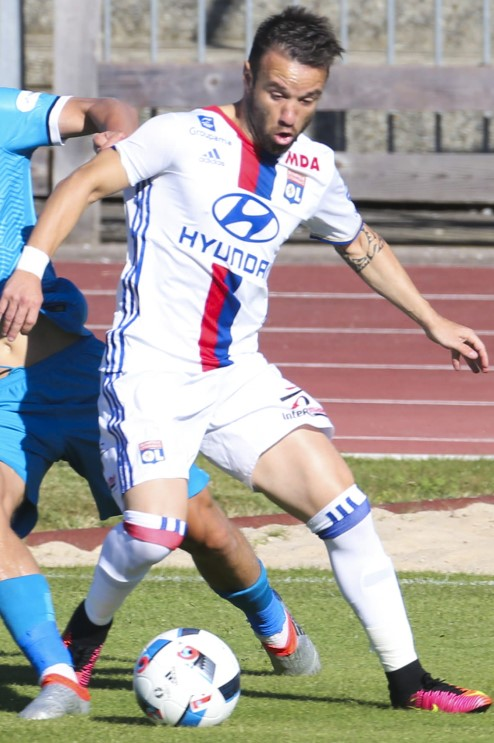
Valbuena on the ball for Lyon in 2016.

Valbuena is described by his former coach at Libourne Saint-Seurin Didier Tholot as "an explosive player who is capable of quickly taking two opponents out of the game to create space, above all due to his dribbling skills." He has been deployed as a wide midfielder or winger since his arrival to the Bordeaux training center in 2001 often playing on the right side of midfield in former Bordeaux manager Elie Baup's preferred 4–3–3 formation. After leaving Bordeaux, Valbuena was primarily deployed in the playmaker position as an attacking midfielder at Langon Castets and Libourne Saint-Seurin. While at these clubs, he developed a penchant for attempting to do everything as stated by both his former club coaches Tholot and Jean-Pierre Léglise, the latter being his manager at Langon Castets.

While at the amateur clubs, Valbuena also honed his quickness, technical ability, and developed his tenacious style of play which contributed to his positive work-rate defensively. Léglise once stated that "he had never worked with such a young person so technically brilliant" in his coaching career. Valbuena's former coach also described the player's tenacious style stating "Whatever the build of the opponent, he will always tackle" and "he also surprised me with the level of his defensive work when he is aligned on the right-hand side". Valbuena is also known for his small size and, while at Langon, began using his diminutive stature to his advantage. During his first season at Marseille, he earned the nickname le petit by his former manager Eric Gerets. Gerets described the player as "extremely mobile" and a player who is "very quick at turning, from one side to the other".

== Personal life ==
Valbuena was born in the southwestern commune of Bruges in the Gironde department to mother Brigitte and father Carlos. He is of Spanish origin through his father, who is originally from the city of Valladolid. Valbuena's father works for the city council of Bordeaux. Valbuena grew up in nearby Blanquefort where his parents still reside. On 24 December 2010, while traveling to Blanquefort to celebrate Christmas with his parents, Valbuena was involved in a car accident after losing control of his Lamborghini Murciélago while driving near Bègles. He survived the accident without any injuries.

== Career statistics ==
=== Club ===
As of match played 26 October 2025

Appearances and goals by club, season and competition
Club	Season	League			National cup (Note: Includes Coupe de France, Russian Cup, Turkish Cup, Greek Cup, Cypriot Cup)		League cup (Note: Includes Coupe de la Ligue)		Europe		Other		Total	
Club	Season	Division	Apps	Goals	Apps	Goals	Apps	Goals	Apps	Goals	Apps	Goals	Apps	Goals
Libourne	2004–05	Championnat National	24	1			—		—		—		24	1
Libourne	2005–06	Championnat National	31	9			—		—		—		31	9
Libourne	Total		55	10			—		—		—		55	10
Marseille	2006–07	Ligue 1	15	1	2	0	0	0	1 (Note: Appearance(s) in UEFA Intertoto Cup)	0	—		18	1
Marseille	2007–08	Ligue 1	29	3	2	1	1	0	10 (Note: Six appearances and one goal in UEFA Champions League, four appearances in UEFA Cup)	1	—		42	5
Marseille	2008–09	Ligue 1	31	3	2	0	1	0	11 (Note: Six appearances in UEFA Champions League, five appearances in UEFA Cup)	0	—		45	3
Marseille	2009–10	Ligue 1	31	5	2	0	4	2	6 (Note: Three appearances in UEFA Champions League, three appearances in UEFA Europa League)	0	—		43	7
Marseille	2010–11	Ligue 1	32	4	1	0	2	0	8 (Note: Appearance(s) in UEFA Champions League)	1	1 (Note: Appearance in Trophée des Champions)	0	44	5
Marseille	2011–12	Ligue 1	33	5	3	1	4	2	9	1	0	0	49	9
Marseille	2012–13	Ligue 1	37	3	3	1	1	0	8 (Note: Appearance(s) in UEFA Europa League)	1	—		49	5
Marseille	2013–14	Ligue 1	34	3	1	0	1	0	5	0	—		41	3
Marseille	Total		242	27	16	3	14	4	58	4	1	0	331	38
Dynamo Moscow	2014–15	Russian Premier League	25	4	0	0	—		11	0	—		36	4
Dynamo Moscow	2015–16	Russian Premier League	4	2	—		—		—		—		4	2
Dynamo Moscow	Total		29	6	0	0	—		11	0	—		40	6
Lyon	2015–16	Ligue 1	26	1	2	1	0	0	5	0	—		33	2
Lyon	2016–17	Ligue 1	30	8	2	0	1	1	9 (Note: Three appearances in UEFA Champions League, six appearances and one goal in UEFA Europa League)	1	1	0	43	10
Lyon	Total		56	9	4	1	1	1	14	1	1	0	76	12
Fenerbahçe	2017–18	Süper Lig	29	7	7	1	—		4	0	—		40	8
Fenerbahçe	2018–19	Süper Lig	22	3	3	0	—		6 (Note: Two appearances in UEFA Champions League, four appearances and one goal in UEFA Europa League)	1	—		31	4
Fenerbahçe	Total		51	10	10	1	—		10	1	—		71	12
Olympiacos	2019–20	Super League Greece	26	7	3	0	—		13 (Note: Nine appearances and two goals in UEFA Champions League, four appearances in UEFA Europa League)	2	—		42	9
Olympiacos	2020–21	Super League Greece	26	1	3	0	—		8 (Note: Five appearances and one goal in UEFA Champions League, three appearances in UEFA Europa League)	1	—		37	2
Olympiacos	2021–22	Super League Greece	28	3	3	0	—		11	0	—		42	3
Olympiacos	2022–23	Super League Greece	18	3	4	1	—		7	0	—		29	4
Olympiacos	Total		98	14	13	1	—		39	3	—		150	18
Apollon Limassol	2023–24	Cypriot First Division	33	7	2	1	—		—		—		35	8
Athens Kallithea	2024–25	Super League Greece	32	3	2	0	—		—		—		34	2
Olympiacos B	2025–26	Super League Greece 2	6	3	—		—		—		—		6	3
Career total			602	89	47	7	15	5	132	9	2	0	798	109

=== International ===
National team	Season	Apps	Goals
France	2009–10	3	1
France	2010–11	5	1
France	2011–12	4	0
France	2012–13	11	3
France	2013–14	13	1
France	2014–15	8	1
France	2015–16	8	1
Total		52	8

No.	Date	Venue	Opponent	Score	Result	Competition
1	26 May 2010	Stade Félix-Bollaert, Lens, France	Costa Rica	2–1	2–1	Friendly
2	17 November 2010	Wembley Stadium, London, England	England	2–0	2–1	Friendly
3	14 November 2012	Stadio Ennio Tardini, Parma, Italy	Italy	1–1	2–1	Friendly
4	6 February 2013	Stade de France, Saint-Denis, France	Germany	1–0	1–2	Friendly
5	22 March 2013	Stade de France, Saint-Denis, France	Georgia	2–0	3–1	2014 FIFA World Cup qualification
6	20 June 2014	Itaipava Arena Fonte Nova, Salvador, Brazil	Switzerland	3–0	5–2	2014 FIFA World Cup
7	7 June 2015	Stade de France, Saint-Denis, France	Belgium	1–3	3–4	Friendly
8	4 September 2015	Estádio José Alvalade, Lisbon, Portugal	Portugal	0–1	0–1	Friendly

== Honours ==
Marseille

- Ligue 1: 2009–10
- Coupe de la Ligue: 2009–10, 2010–11, 2011–12
- Trophée des Champions: 2010, 2011

Olympiacos

- Super League Greece: 2019–20, 2020–21, 2021–22
- Greek Cup: 2019–20

Individual

- Ligue 1 Team of the Year: 2007–08, 2012–13
- Ligue 1 Goal of the Year: 2007–08
- Ligue 1 top assist provider: 2012–13
- List of 33 Top Players of the Russian Premier League: 2014–15
- Russian Premier League top assist provider: 2014–15
- Super League Greece Player of the Month: September 2019
- Super League Greece top assist provider: 2019–20
- Super League Greece Team of the Season: 2019–20
