= Vitorino Hilton =

Brazilian footballer

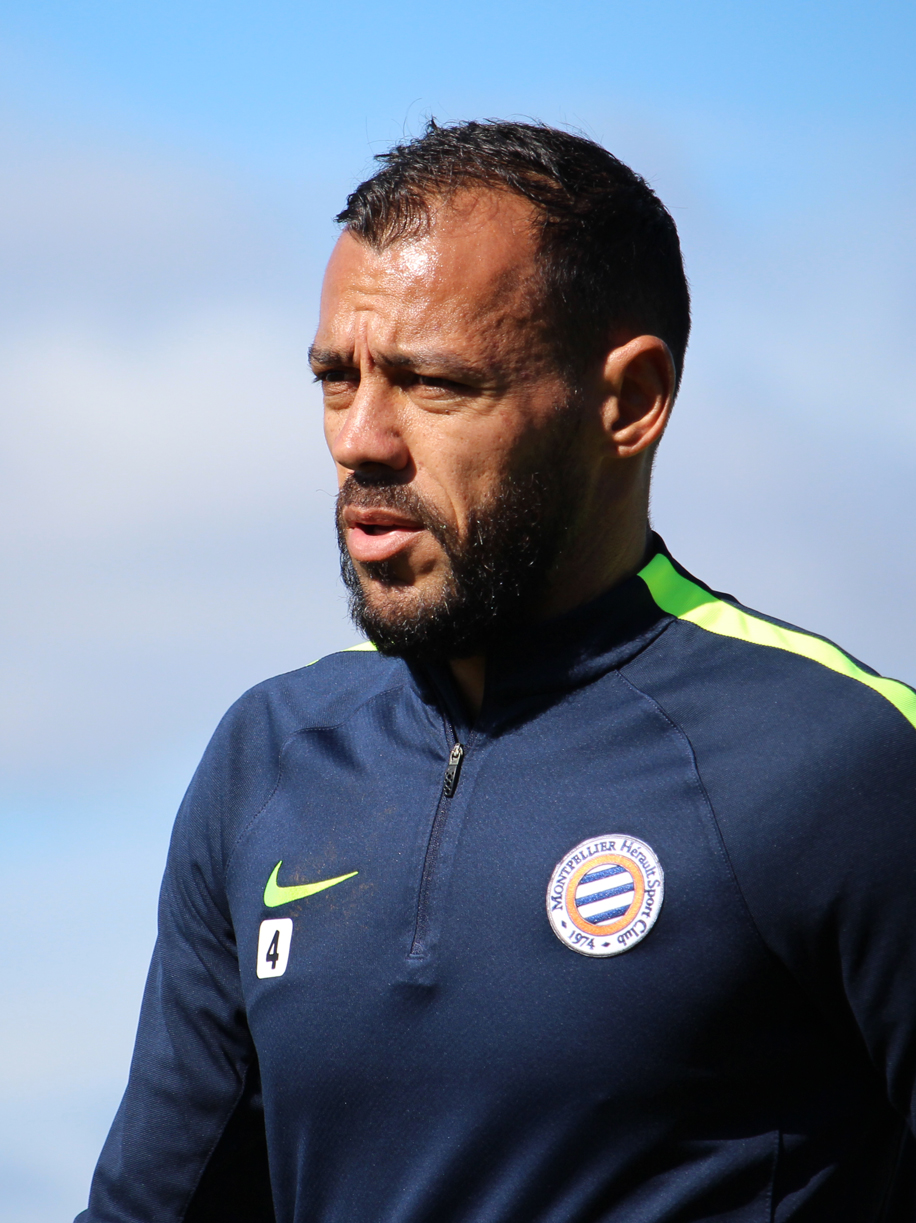
- Hilton in 2018

Personal information
- Full name: Vitorino Hilton da Silva
- Date of birth: 13 September 1977 (age 49)
- Place of birth: Brasília, Brazil
- Height: 1.82 m (6 ft 0 in)
- Position: Centre-back

Senior career*
Years	Team	Apps	(Gls)
1996–1999	Chapecoense	0	(0)
2000–2001	Paraná	14	(1)
2002–2004	Servette	72	(3)
2004	→ Bastia (loan)	14	(0)
2004–2008	Lens	122	(8)
2008–2011	Marseille	56	(2)
2011–2021	Montpellier	320	(10)
2022	Sète	4	(0)
Total		598	(24)
- * Club domestic league appearances and goals

Vitorino Hilton da Silva (born 13 September 1977), commonly known as Vitorino Hilton or just Hilton, is a Brazilian former professional footballer who played as a centre-back.

Beginning his career in Brazil, at 23 he moved to Europe to play for Servette, where he played for two and a half seasons, before joining Bastia on loan in 2004 and then moving to Lens. At Lens, he established himself as a notable defender in French football, being named twice for the Ligue 1 Team of the Year. He then signed for Marseille, where he was again named for the Team of the Year and help the club win the league title in 2010. After personal problems at Marseille, he went on to sign for Montpellier, where he went on to spend the next ten seasons, becoming a fan favourite and helping the team win their first and to date only league title, in 2012. In 2022, he joined Sète on a five-month contract.

After retiring in 2021, Hilton was the foreign player with most matches played in the history of French top-flight football and fourteenth player overall, with 512 appearances.

== Career ==
Born in Brasília, Brazil, Hilton started his professional career in 1996 at Chapecoense and stayed there for three years before moving to Paraná Clube. After one season there, Hilton move to Europe by joining Swiss side Servette. At Servette, Hilton quickly established himself in the first team. Hilton scored his first European goal, in the third round; second leg, in a 3–0 win over Hertha. Sadly, Hilton scored an own goal, in the fourth round; first leg, in a 3–0 loss against Valencia. Throughout his two-season career at Servette, Hilton made 57 appearances and scoring twice in all competition. Hilton scored his first league goal, on 28 September 2003, in a 3–1 win over Zürich. In January transfer window 2004, Hilton joined Ligue 1 side Bastia on six-month loan, which lasted until the end of the season. Hilton played his first game in Ligue 1, on 7 February 2004, in a 1–0 victory over Toulouse. On 1 May 2004, Hilton received a straight red card, in a 4–0 loss against Rennes. Upon return to Servette, Hilton left the club, citing the club's financial problem.

=== Lens ===
After a loan spell at Bastia, Hilton joined Lens on a five-year contract. Hilton made his debut, in the opening game of the season, in a 0–0 draw against Toulouse and several weeks later, on 21 August 2004, Hilton scored his first goal in Ligue 1, in a 2–0 win over Istres. Then thirty-two days later, on 22 September 2004, Hilton scored his second goal, in a 2–2 draw against Paris Saint-Germain. However, his good start at Lens soon faded when Hilton tore his knee ligaments in training, which he will be out for three months. Later in the 2004–05 season, Hilton scored twice in twenty-seven appearances, while the club achieved winning the Intertoto Cup. Then in 2005–06 season, Hilton scored, again, in a 2–0 win over Marseille and scored against them, once again, five months later on 4 January 2006. In the first round and first leg of UEFA Cup, Hilton scored in a 1–1 draw against Polish side Grodzisk. He made 43 appearances in all competitions and scored three times.

In the 2006–07 season, Hilton was ever present with 37 appearances in the league and ten appearances in European competitions. He scored twice in the season; against Bordeaux on 2 December 2006 and another against Sochaux on 12 February 2007. Trailing behind leaders Lyon, Hilton would have a problem, himself: injuries, but managed to overcome from the injury. However, in the 2007–08 season, Hilton appearance soon faded, making twenty-three appearances, mainly because of hip injury, which left him out for two months. Despite the injury, he scored twice in the season: against Valenciennes on 23 January 2008, and against Derby du Nord rival Lille, in a 2–1 win on 11 March 2008. In addition, Hilton earned the club's captain band in the absence of Yohan Demont. The 2007–08 was unachievable for the club as they faced Paris-Saint Germain in the Coupe de la Ligue Final, but lost 2–1. It couldn't get worse when the club was relegated to Ligue 2 after finishing 18th place. While at Lens, Hilton has established himself as a key figure at the heart of the rearguard and Hilton was named Trophées UNFP du football's Team of the Year: three times in 2006, 2007 and 2008.

=== Marseille ===
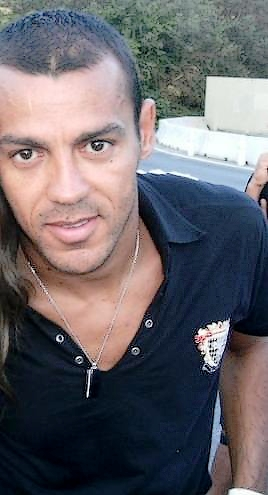
Hilton in 2010

Following Lens' relegation, Hilton joined Marseille for €5 million, signing a four-year contract.

Hilton made his debut, in the opening game of the season, in a 4–4 draw against Rennes. His first goal came on 12 April 2009, in a 4–1 win over Grenoble. Hilton was almost ever present in the first team, in the European competitions and made thirty-six appearances. His regular start at Marseille earned him 2009 Team of The Year in his fourth consecutive row, which the row ended the next season. However, the 2009–10 season, under new manager Didier Deschamps, Hilton soon lost his first team place and mainly was on the bench. Also, injuries started to haunt him again. Despite this, Hilton scored twice in the season: One was in the Champions League Group-Stage against Zurich, with a 6–1 win on 3 November 2009 and another came on 8 May 2010, in a 3–2 loss against Lille. At the end of the 2009–10 season, the club won the league title for the first time for 18 years. In 2010–11 season grew worse for Hilton as he made eight appearances. Following his house robbery, Hilton wanted to leave the club and finally left on 1 August 2011, having one-year contract with the club.

=== Montpellier ===
After leaving Marseille for good, Hilton signed a one-year contract with Montpellier despite interests from Ligue 1's rival Evian. Hilton revealed that he's expected to return to his homeland after becoming unsettled in France before joining Montpellier. Hilton made his debut, on 14 August 2011, in a 1–0 win against defending champion Lille. After making seven appearances so far, he scored his first goal for the club, in a 2–2 draw against Bordeaux. At Montpellier, Hilton helped the club win their first league title after winning 2–1 against already relegated side Auxerre. At the end of the 2011–12 season, Hilton was named Trophées UNFP du football's Team of the Year of 2012. During the season, Hilton's contract with Montpellier was extended after the club activated its options to keep him for another year.

The following 2012–13 season, Hilton continued to be in the club's first team place, though been used in and out. Hilton played his first European match in over two years, in a 2–1 loss against Arsenal in the group-stage of the Champions League. Eventually, the club was eliminated from the Champions League after finishing fourth place. Following the departure of Mapou Yanga-Mbiwa to Newcastle United, Hilton was appointed as the club's new captain. On 1 March 2013, Hilton scored his first goal of the season, in a 2–0 win over Rennes. However, the club was unable to defend their league title as they surrendered it to title chaser Paris Saint Germain, who finished second last season. The club finished ninth place, far from missing out of European competitions. Despite this, Hilton signed a one-year contract with the club, until 2014.

On 7 February 2017, Hilton scored Montpellier's goal in a 2–1 home defeat to AS Monaco, becoming, at the age of 39, the oldest Ligue 1 goalscorer until Benjamin Nivet scored for Troyes AC in April 2018. On 3 February 2019, Hilton started against Nîmes and in doing so, he become the oldest player to feature in a Ligue 1 match in the 21st century at the age of 41 years and 143 days, thus breaking the previous record set up by Benjamin Nivet by six days. On 15 September 2020, just two days after his 43rd birthday, he become the first player since Roger Courtois in 1956 to play a match in Ligue 1 at the age of 43 when he featured in Montpelier's 2–1 victory over Lyon. However, he was also sent off in the 81st minute.

In June 2021, Hilton announced that he would be leaving Montpellier following the expiration of his contract on 1 July. The same day, he announced his retirement from football.

=== Sète ===
In October 2021 Hilton stated his desire to return to playing. After training with Béziers, he joined Championnat National club Sète on a five-month contract on 1 February 2022.

== Personal life ==
In August 2011, Sports Illustrated reported that Hilton was among eight players to be victimised of robbery at their home in the last 18 months. Hilton told RMC Radio that robbery left his family so traumatised that they wanted to move back to Brazil. Hilton was also assaulted when six men entered his house just before midnight, struck him on the head with a rifle-butt, and stole his possessions, including Renault car, which was found burned an hour away. In an interview with Goal.com, Hilton also revealed that the robbery convinced him to leave Marseille after the city left him and his family "psychologically scarred". He described this as a "tough moment for him". In October 2011, Police in Marseille arrested seven people for suspicion of involvement in an armed robbery. Of those seven suspects, five were charged for theft and assault on Hilton. It was revealed that the five suspects were involved in a robbery on different players and have been prosecuted. He has since overcome this trauma and moved on, with his family settling in well.

== Honours ==
Paraná Clube

- Campeonato Brasileiro Série B: 2000

Lens

- UEFA Intertoto Cup: 2005

Marseille

- Ligue 1: 2009–10
- Coupe de la Ligue: 2009–10, 2010–11
- Trophée des Champions: 2010

Montpellier

- Ligue 1: 2011–12

Individual

- Ligue 1 Team of the Year: 2006–07, 2007–08, 2008–09, 2011–12
