= Anthony Guise =

French footballer (born 1985)

Personal information
- Date of birth: March 5, 1985 (age 41)
- Place of birth: Arles, France
- Height: 1.83 m (6 ft 0 in)
- Position: Striker

Senior career*
Years	Team	Apps	(Gls)
2009–2012	Arles-Avignon	13	(1)
2010–2011	→ Luzenac (loan)	30	(4)
- * Club domestic league appearances and goals as of 09:31, 22 September 2012 (UTC)

Anthony Guise (born 5 March 1985) is a French footballer who plays as a striker. He appeared in Ligue 1 for Arles-Avignon.
