= Laurent Spinosi =

French goalkeeper and football coach (born 1969)

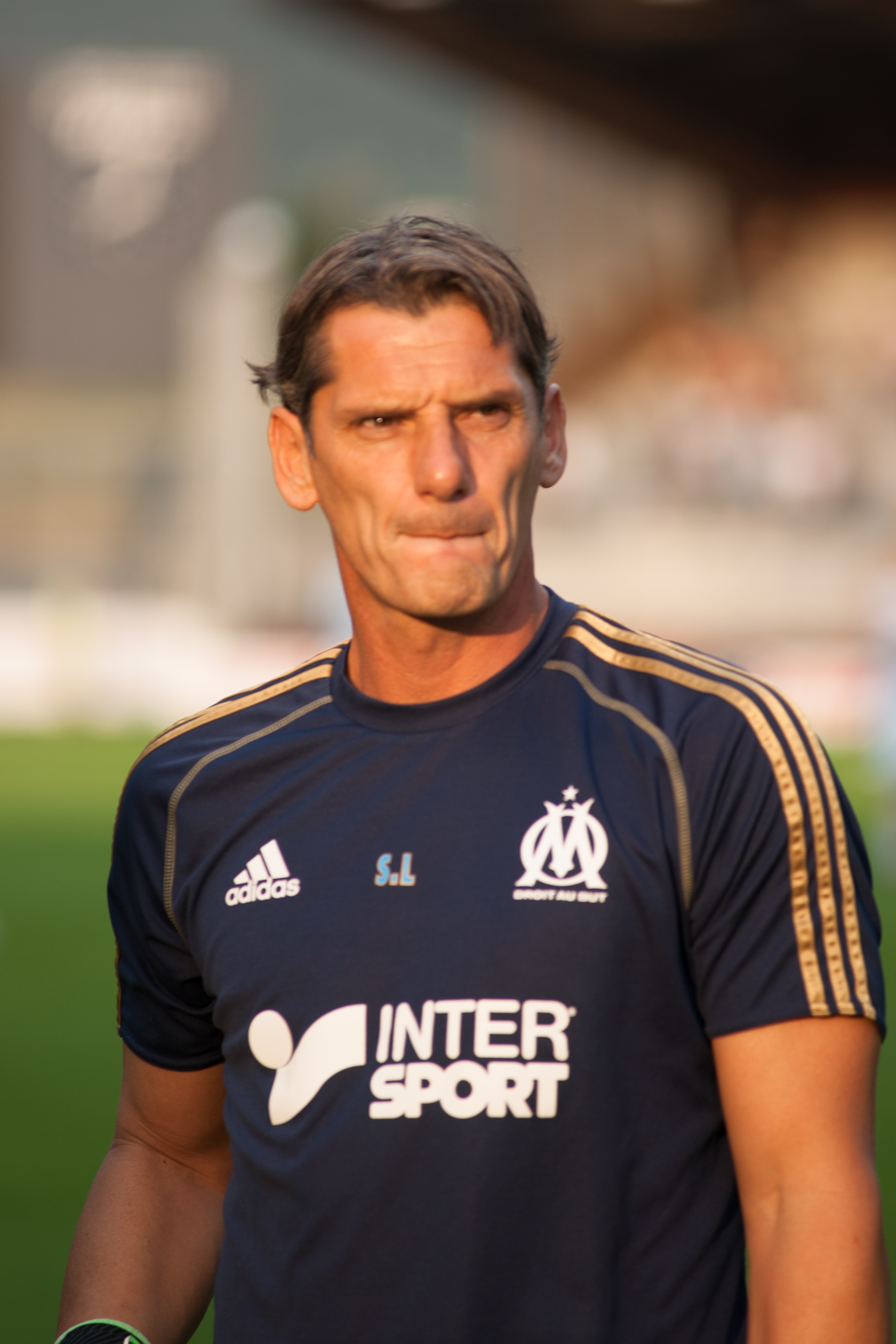

Personal information
- Full name: Laurent Spinosi
- Date of birth: 20 November 1969 (age 56)
- Place of birth: Marseille, France
- Height: 1.80 m (5 ft 11 in)
- Position: Goalkeeper

Youth career
- 1976–1982: La Barasse
- 1982–1984: US Le Rouet
- 1984–1987: AS Mazargues
- 1987–1994: US Endoume
- 2003–2004: US Endoume

Senior career*
Years	Team	Apps	(Gls)
1994–2000	Marseille	5	(0)

Managerial career
- 2000–2003: Marseille res (goalkeeping coach)
- 2004–2010: Marseille (goalkeeping coach)
- 2010–2012: Ivory Coast (goalkeeping coach)
- 2012–2014: Marseille (goalkeeping coach)
- 2014–2016: Al Jazira (goalkeeping coach)
- 2016–2019: Marseille res (goalkeeping coach)
- 2019–: Iran (goalkeeping coach)
- * Club domestic league appearances and goals

Laurent Spinosi (born in Marseille) is a retired French goalkeeper and current coach. He was formerly goalkeeping coach of Olympique de Marseille and Ivory Coast national team.
