= Fabrice Abriel =

French football manager (born 1979)

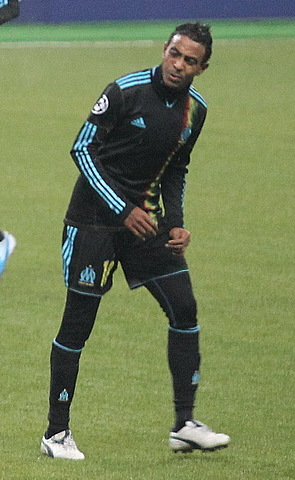
- Abriel playing for Marseille in 2010

Personal information
- Full name: Fabrice Jean Thierry Abriel
- Date of birth: 6 July 1979 (age 47)
- Place of birth: Suresnes, Hauts-de-Seine, France
- Height: 1.76 m (5 ft 9 in)
- Position: Midfielder

Youth career
- 1997–1999: Paris Saint-Germain

Senior career*
Years	Team	Apps	(Gls)
1999–2002	Paris Saint-Germain	2	(0)
2001	→ Servette (loan)	2	(0)
2001–2002	→ Amiens (loan)	37	(4)
2002–2004	Amiens	78	(11)
2004–2006	Guingamp	69	(8)
2006–2009	Lorient	111	(10)
2009–2011	Marseille	54	(1)
2011–2014	Nice	80	(1)
2014–2015	Valenciennes	25	(0)
2015	Valenciennes B	2	(0)
Total		460	(35)

Managerial career
- 2016–2017: FC Gobelins
- 2021–2024: Fleury (women)
- 2024–2025: Paris Saint-Germain (women)
- * Club domestic league appearances and goals

Fabrice Jean Thierry Abriel (born 6 July 1979) is a French professional football manager and former player who lastly worked as the head coach of Première Ligue club Paris Saint-Germain Féminine. During his playing career as a midfielder, he played for Paris Saint-Germain, Servette, Amiens, Guingamp, Lorient, Marseille, Nice and Valenciennes.

Abriel retired from football in 2015 and became a consultant for the French TV station Canal+ before getting into coaching.

== Coaching career ==
On 8 July 2024, Abriel was appointed as the manager of Première Ligue club Paris Saint-Germain on a two-year contract until June 2026.

== Honours ==
Marseille

- Ligue 1: 2009–10
- Coupe de la Ligue: 2009–10, 2010–11
- Trophée des Champions: 2010
