= 1999–2000 Lille OSC season =

Lille
1999–2000 season
- President: Bernard Lecomte
- Head coach: Vahid Halilhodžić
- Stadium: Stade Grimonprez-Jooris
- Division 2: 1st
- Coupe de France: Round of 64
- Coupe de la Ligue: First round
- Top goalscorer: Djézon Boutoille (12)
- Biggest win: Lille 5–0 Créteil
- Biggest defeat: Sochaux 2–0 Lille
Home colours	Away colours

The 1999–2000 season was the 56th season in the history of Lille OSC and the club's third consecutive season in the second division of French football. They participated in the French Division 2, the Coupe de France and the Coupe de la Ligue.

== Competitions ==
=== Overall record ===
Competition	First match	Last match	Starting round	Final position	Record							
Competition	First match	Last match	Starting round	Final position	Pld	W	D	L	GF	GA	GD	Win %
Division 2	31 July 1999	20 May 2000	Matchday 1	Winners	38	25	8	5	58	25	+33	65.79
Coupe de France	22 January 2000		Round of 64	Round of 64	1	0	1	0	1	1	+0	0.00
Coupe de la Ligue	16 November 1999		First round	First round	1	0	1	0	2	2	+0	0.00
Total					40	25	10	5	61	28	+33	62.50

Source: Competitions

=== Division 2 ===
==== League table ====
Pos	Team	Pld	W	D	L	GF	GA	GD	Pts	Promotion or Relegation
1	Lille (C, P)	38	25	8	5	58	25	+33	83	Promotion to French Division 1
2	Guingamp (P)	38	18	13	7	62	41	+21	67	Promotion to French Division 1
3	Toulouse (P)	38	18	9	11	52	31	+21	63	Promotion to French Division 1
4	Sochaux	38	18	8	12	53	41	+12	62	
5	Gueugnon	38	13	17	8	47	34	+13	56	Qualification to UEFA Cup First round (Note: Coupe de la Ligue winners Gueugnon qualify for the 2000–01 UEFA Cup First round of 2000–01 UEFA Cup.)

Source: Ligue 2
(C) Champions; (P) Promoted

==== Results summary ====
Overall								Home						Away					
Pld	W	D	L	GF	GA	GD	Pts	W	D	L	GF	GA	GD	W	D	L	GF	GA	GD
38	25	8	5	58	25	+33	83	17	1	1	34	7	+27	8	7	4	24	18	+6

==== Results by round ====
Round	1	2	3	4	5	6	7	8	9	10	11	12	13	14	15	16	17	18	19	20	21	22	23	24	25	26	27	28	29	30	31	32	33	34	35	36	37	38
Ground	A	H	A	H	A	H	A	H	A	H	A	H	A	H	A	H	A	A	H	A	H	A	H	A	H	A	H	A	H	A	H	A	H	A	H	H	A	H
Result	W	W	D	W	W	W	W	W	W	W	L	W	D	W	W	L	L	W	W	D	W	W	W	W	W	L	W	D	W	D	W	D	D	L	W	W	D	W
Position	4	1	2	1	1	1	1	1	1	1	1	1	1	1	1	1	1	1	1	1	1	1	1	1	1	1	1	1	1	1	1	1	1	1	1	1	1	1

A = Away; H = Home; W = Win; D = Draw; L = Loss

==== Matches ====
31 July 1999 1	Laval	0–1	Lille	Laval
			Boutoille 30'	Stadium: Stade Francis Le Basser

7 August 1999 2	Lille	1–0	Nîmes	Lille
	Br. Cheyrou 87'			Stadium: Stade Grimonprez-Jooris

14 August 1999 3	Nice	0–0	Lille	Nice
				Stadium: Stade du Ray

17 August 1999 4	Lille	4–2	Ajaccio	Lille
	Boutoille 69', 72'; Landrin 88'; Peyrelade 90'		Granon 66'; Faderne 86'	Stadium: Stade Grimonprez-Jooris

21 August 1999 5	Châteauroux	2–3	Lille	Châteauroux
	Savidan 70' (pen.), 82'		Collot 66'; Agasson 85' (pen.); Boutoille 90'	Stadium: Stade Gaston-Petit

27 August 1999 6	Lille	1–0	Louhans-Cuiseaux	Lille
	Collot 76'			Stadium: Stade Grimonprez-Jooris

3 September 1999 7	Toulouse	0–2	Lille	Toulouse
			Boutoille 45'; Baldé 75' (o.g.)

7 September 1999 8	Lille	1–0	Wasquehal	Lille
	Agasson 28'			Stadium: Stade Grimonprez-Jooris

11 September 1999 9	Niort	0–3	Lille	Niort
			Bakari 76'; Agasson 81'; Boutoille 90'

18 September 1999 10	Lille	2–0	Le Mans	Lille
	Bakari 47'; Peyrelade 64' (pen.)			Stadium: Stade Grimonprez-Jooris

24 September 1999 11	Caen	1–0	Lille	Caen
	N'Diaye 44'

1 October 1999 12	Lille	2–0	Cannes	Lille
	Giublesi 6'; Peyrelade 7'			Stadium: Stade Grimonprez-Jooris

8 October 1999 13	Valence	2–2	Lille	Valence
	Forge 45'; Malm 59'		Peyrelade 19'; Valois 79'

16 October 1999 14	Lille	1–0	Lorient	Lille
	Boutoille 67'			Stadium: Stade Grimonprez-Jooris

23 October 1999 15	Gueugnon	0–1	Lille	Gueugnon
			Agasson 44' (pen.)

30 October 1999 16	Lille	0–1	Sochaux	Lille
			Manac'h 31'	Stadium: Stade Grimonprez-Jooris

6 November 1999 17	Créteil	1–0	Lille	Créteil
	Castro 84'

9 November 1999 18	Amiens	0–1	Lille	Amiens
			Cygan 50'

12 November 1999 19	Lille	2–0	Guingamp	Lille
	Valois 37'; Boutoille 76'			Stadium: Stade Grimonprez-Jooris

21 November 1999 20	Nîmes	3–3	Lille	Nîmes
	Oruma 17'; Benkouar 51'; Brouard 56' (pen.)		Fahmi 76'; D'Amico 84', 89'

2 December 1999 21	Lille	1–0	Nice	Lille
	Peyrelade 56'			Stadium: Stade Grimonprez-Jooris

11 December 1999 22	Ajaccio	0–1	Lille	Ajaccio
			Cygan 79'

15 January 2000 23	Lille	1–0	Châteauroux	Lille
	Boutoille 59'			Stadium: Stade Grimonprez-Jooris

26 January 2000 24	Louhans-Cuiseaux	1–2	Lille	Louhans
	Lima 32'		Boutoille 44'; Landrin 82'

2 February 2000 25	Lille	2–0	Toulouse	Lille
	Bakari 4', 90'			Stadium: Stade Grimonprez-Jooris

5 February 2000 26	Wasquehal	2–1	Lille	Wasquehal
	Clément-Demange 58', 80'		Landrin 15'

16 February 2000 27	Lille	1–0	Niort	Lille
	Valois 84'			Stadium: Stade Grimonprez-Jooris

26 February 2000 28	Le Mans	1–1	Lille	Le Mans
	Charrièras 5'		Landrin 55'

10 March 2000 29	Lille	3–2	Caen	Lille
	Peyrelade 24', 28'; Bakari 67'		Gallon 39'; Watier 49'	Stadium: Stade Grimonprez-Jooris

15 March 2000 30	Cannes	2–2	Lille	Cannes
	Suarez 62'; Sadani 72'		Agasson 36'; Ecker 88'

31 March 2000 31	Lille	4–1	Valence	Lille
	Bakari 43'; Boutoille 61', 68'; Valois 90'		Correia 69'	Stadium: Stade Grimonprez-Jooris

8 April 2000 32	Lorient	0–0	Lille	Lorient

15 April 2000 33	Lille	1–1	Gueugnon	Lille
	Br. Cheyrou 82'		Traoré 47' (pen.)	Stadium: Stade Grimonprez-Jooris

21 April 2000 34	Sochaux	2–0	Lille	Lille
	Frau 4', 81'

29 April 2000 35	Lille	5–0	Créteil	Lille
	Agasson 2' (pen.), 86'; Bakari 55'; Br. Cheyrou 56', 80'			Stadium: Stade Grimonprez-Jooris

6 May 2000 36	Lille	1–0	Amiens	Lille
	Br. Cheyrou 56'			Stadium: Stade Grimonprez-Jooris

12 May 2000 37	Guingamp	1–1	Lille	Guingamp
	Michel 87' (pen.)		Agasson 42'

20 May 2000 38	Lille	1–0	Laval	Lille
	Tourenne 58' (pen.)			Stadium: Stade Grimonprez-Jooris

=== Coupe de France ===
22 January 2000 Round of 64	Calais RUFC	1–1 (a.e.t.) (7–6 p)	Lille	Calais
18:00	Cygan 68' (o.g.)		Peyrelade 25'	Stadium: Stade Julien-Denis; Attendance: 4,500; Referee: Bruno Ruffray

=== Coupe de la Ligue ===
16 November 1999 First round	Lille	2–2 (a.e.t.) (1–4 p)	Red Star	Lille
	Bakari 72'; Agasson 78' (pen.)		Akiana 67'; Sirufo 90'	Stadium: Stade Grimonprez-Jooris
