= 2000–01 Lille OSC season =

Lille
2000–01 season
- President: Luc Dayan; Francis Graille
- Head coach: Vahid Halilhodžić
- Stadium: Stade Grimonprez-Jooris
- Division 1: 3rd
- Coupe de France: Round of 64
- Coupe de la Ligue: Round of 32
- Average home league attendance: 16,793
| Home colours | Away colours |

The 2000–01 season was the 57th season in the existence of Lille OSC and the club's first season back in the top flight of French football. They participated in the Ligue 1, the Coupe de France and the Coupe de la Ligue.

== Competitions ==
=== Overall record ===
| Competition | First match | Last match | Starting round | Final position | Record | | | | | | | |
| Competition | First match | Last match | Starting round | Final position | Pld | W | D | L | GF | GA | GD | Win % |
|---|---|---|---|---|---|---|---|---|---|---|---|---|
| Division 1 | 29 July 2000 | 19 May 2001 | Matchday 1 | 3rd | 34 | 16 | 11 | 7 | 57 | 30 | +27 | 47.06 |
| Coupe de France | 20 January 2001 | | Round of 64 | Round of 64 | 1 | 0 | 0 | 1 | 0 | 1 | −1 | 0.00 |
| Coupe de la Ligue | 6 January 2001 | | Round of 32 | Round of 32 | 1 | 0 | 0 | 1 | 0 | 1 | −1 | 0.00 |
| Total | | | | | 36 | 16 | 11 | 9 | 57 | 32 | +25 | 44.44 |

Source: Competitions

=== Division 1 ===
==== League table ====
| Pos | Team | Pld | W | D | L | GF | GA | GD | Pts | Qualification or relegation |
|---|---|---|---|---|---|---|---|---|---|---|
| 1 | Nantes (C) | 34 | 21 | 5 | 8 | 58 | 36 | +22 | 68 | Qualification to Champions League first group stage |
| 2 | Lyon | 34 | 17 | 13 | 4 | 57 | 30 | +27 | 64 | Qualification to Champions League first group stage |
| 3 | Lille | 34 | 16 | 11 | 7 | 43 | 27 | +16 | 59 | Qualification to Champions League third qualifying round |
| 4 | Bordeaux | 34 | 15 | 12 | 7 | 48 | 33 | +15 | 57 | Qualification to UEFA Cup first round |
| 5 | Sedan | 34 | 14 | 10 | 10 | 47 | 40 | +7 | 52 | Qualification to UEFA Cup first round |

Source: Ligue 1
Rules for classification: 1) points; 2) goal difference; 3) number of goals scored.
(C) Champions

==== Results summary ====
| Overall | | | | | | | | Home | | | | | | Away | | | | | |
| Pld | W | D | L | GF | GA | GD | Pts | W | D | L | GF | GA | GD | W | D | L | GF | GA | GD |
|---|---|---|---|---|---|---|---|---|---|---|---|---|---|---|---|---|---|---|---|
| 34 | 16 | 11 | 7 | 43 | 27 | +16 | 59 | 9 | 6 | 2 | 25 | 14 | +11 | 7 | 5 | 5 | 18 | 13 | +5 |

==== Results by round ====
| Round | 1 | 2 | 3 | 4 | 5 | 6 | 7 | 8 | 9 | 10 | 11 | 12 | 13 | 14 | 15 | 16 | 17 | 18 | 19 | 20 | 21 | 22 | 23 | 24 | 25 | 26 | 27 | 28 | 29 | 30 | 31 | 32 | 33 | 34 |
|---|---|---|---|---|---|---|---|---|---|---|---|---|---|---|---|---|---|---|---|---|---|---|---|---|---|---|---|---|---|---|---|---|---|---|
| Ground | H | A | H | A | H | A | H | A | H | A | H | A | H | A | H | A | H | H | A | H | A | H | A | H | A | H | A | H | A | H | A | H | A | A |
| Result | D | W | W | L | W | L | L | D | W | D | D | W | W | L | D | W | W | D | L | W | D | W | L | W | W | D | W | W | W | D | D | L | D | W |
| Position | 10 | 3 | 1 | 4 | 2 | 3 | 7 | 8 | 4 | 4 | 8 | 3 | 2 | 5 | 6 | 3 | 2 | 3 | 5 | 3 | 4 | 2 | 2 | 1 | 1 | 1 | 1 | 1 | 1 | 2 | 3 | 4 | 4 | 3 |

A = Away; H = Home; W = Win; D = Draw; L = Loss

==== Matches ====
| 29 July 2000 1 | Lille | 1–1 | Monaco | Lille |
| --:-- CEST (UTC+2) | Br. Cheyrou 54' | | Giuly 43' | Stadium: [[]] |

| 5 August 2000 2 | Strasbourg | 0–4 | Lille | Strasbourg |
| --:-- CEST (UTC+2) | | | Murati 39'; Peyrelade 63'; Collot 78', 86' | Stadium: [[]] |

| 12 August 2000 3 | Lille | 1–0 | Rennes | Lille |
| --:-- CEST (UTC+2) | Cygan 62' | | | Stadium: [[]] |

| 19 August 2000 4 | Sedan | 1–0 | Lille | Sedan |
| --:-- CEST (UTC+2) | Quint 74' | | | Stadium: [[]] |

| 26 August 2000 5 | Lille | 2–1 | Metz | Lille |
| --:-- CEST (UTC+2) | Beck 53'; Bakari 81' | | Bastien 26' | Stadium: [[]] |

| 6 September 2000 6 | Bastia | 1–0 | Lille | Furiani |
| --:-- CEST (UTC+2) | Née 55' | | | Stadium: [[]] |

| 9 September 2000 7 | Lille | 1–2 | Troyes | Lille |
| --:-- CEST (UTC+2) | Cheyrou 7' | | Jbari 3'; Goussé 33' | Stadium: [[]] |

| 17 September 2000 8 | Saint-Étienne | 1–1 | Lille | Saint-Étienne |
| --:-- CEST (UTC+2) | Alex Dias 20' | | Beck 40' | Stadium: [[]] |

| 24 September 2000 9 | Lille | 2–1 | Lens | Lille |
| --:-- CEST (UTC+2) | Bakari 85'; Peyrelade 90' | | Brunel 23' | Stadium: [[]] |

| 1 October 2000 10 | Nantes | 0–0 | Lille | Nantes |
| --:-- CEST (UTC+2) | | | | Stadium: [[]] |

| 14 October 2000 11 | Lille | 1–1 | Guingamp | Lyon |
| --:-- CEST (UTC+2) | Boutoille 49' | | Colleau 55' | Stadium: [[]] |

| 22 October 2000 12 | Marseille | 0–1 | Lille | Marseille |
| --:-- CEST (UTC+2) | | | Beck 66' | Stadium: [[]] |

| 29 October 2000 13 | Lille | 1–0 | Toulouse | Lille |
| --:-- CEST (UTC+2) | Peyrelade 80' | | | Stadium: [[]] |

| 4 November 2000 14 | Bordeaux | 1–0 | Lille | Bordeaux |
| --:-- CEST (UTC+2) | Feindouno 90' | | | Stadium: [[]] |

| 11 November 2000 15 | Lille | 1–1 | Auxerre | Lille |
| --:-- CEST (UTC+2) | Beck 58' | | Guivarc'h 90' | Stadium: [[]] |

| 18 November 2000 16 | Lyon | 0–1 | Lille | Lyon |
| --:-- CEST (UTC+2) | | | Landrin 73' | Stadium: [[]] |

| 29 November 2000 18 | Lille | 1–1 | Strasbourg | Lille |
| --:-- CEST (UTC+2) | Peyrelade 27' | | Martins 34' | Stadium: [[]] |

| 2 December 2000 19 | Rennes | 2–0 | Lille | Rennes |
| --:-- CEST (UTC+2) | Le Roux 52'; Chapuis 85' | | | Stadium: [[]] |

| 9 December 2000 20 | Lille | 2–0 | Sedan | Lyon |
| --:-- CEST (UTC+2) | Sterjovski 8'; Collot 90' | | | Stadium: [[]] |

| 13 December 2000 17 | Lille | 2–0 | Paris Saint-Germain | Lille |
| --:-- CEST (UTC+2) | Sterjovski 13', 71' | | | Stadium: [[]] |

| 16 December 2000 21 | Metz | 1–1 | Lille | Metz |
| --:-- CEST (UTC+2) | Baticle 45' | | Landrin 88' | Stadium: [[]] |

| 21 December 2000 22 | Lille | 1–0 | Bastia | Lille |
| --:-- CEST (UTC+2) | Valois 70' | | | Stadium: [[]] |

| 13 January 2001 23 | Troyes | 2–1 | Lille | Troyes |
| --:-- CEST (UTC+2) | Goussé 70'; Cygan 76' (o.g.) | | Boutoille 9' | Stadium: [[]] |

| 27 January 2001 24 | Lille | 4–1 | Saint-Étienne | Lille |
| --:-- CEST (UTC+2) | Bakari 20', 27'; Cygan 36'; D'Amico 64' | | Diawara 28' | Stadium: [[]] |

| 4 February 2001 25 | Lens | 0–1 | Lille | Lens |
| --:-- CEST (UTC+2) | | | Rool 50' (o.g.) | Stadium: [[]] |

| 7 February 2001 26 | Lille | 1–1 | Nantes | Lille |
| --:-- CEST (UTC+2) | N'Diaye 84' | | Carrière 44' | Stadium: [[]] |

| 17 February 2001 27 | Guingamp | 0–1 | Lille | Guingamp |
| --:-- CEST (UTC+2) | | | Bakari 39' | Stadium: [[]] |

| 3 March 2001 28 | Lille | 1–0 | Marseille | Lille |
| --:-- CEST (UTC+2) | Br. Cheyrou 24' | | | Stadium: [[]] |

| 17 March 2001 29 | Toulouse | 0–2 | Lille | Toulouse |
| --:-- CEST (UTC+2) | | | Sterjovski 9'; Ecker 90' | Stadium: [[]] |

| 6 April 2001 30 | Lille | 2–2 | Bordeaux | Lille |
| --:-- CEST (UTC+2) | Peyrelade 51', 58' | | Pauleta 17', 71' | Stadium: [[]] |

| 14 April 2001 31 | Auxerre | 1–1 | Lille | Auxerre |
| --:-- CEST (UTC+2) | Cissé 3' | | N'Diaye 23' | Stadium: [[]] |

| 28 April 2001 32 | Lille | 1–2 | Lyon | Lille |
| --:-- CEST (UTC+2) | Ecker 23' | | Sonny Anderson 25'; Delmotte 90' | Stadium: [[]] |

| 12 May 2001 33 | Paris Saint-Germain | 2–2 | Lille | Paris |
| --:-- CEST (UTC+2) | Arteta 56'; Madar 89' | | Br. Cheyrou 12', 69' | Stadium: [[]] |

| 19 May 2001 34 | Monaco | 1–2 | Lille | Monaco |
| --:-- CEST (UTC+2) | Farnerud 2' | | Peyrelade 33'; Br. Cheyrou 80' | Stadium: Stade Louis II |

=== Coupe de France ===
| 20 January 2001 Round of 64 | Auxerre | 1–0 | Lille | Auxerre |
| --:-- CEST (UTC+2) | Cissé 52' | | | Stadium: [[]] |

=== Coupe de la Ligue ===
| 6 January 2001 Round of 32 | Bordeaux | 1–0 | Lille | Bordeaux |
| --:-- CEST (UTC+2) | Sommeil 53' | | | Stadium: [[]] |
