= Matthieu Delpierre =

French footballer (born 1981)

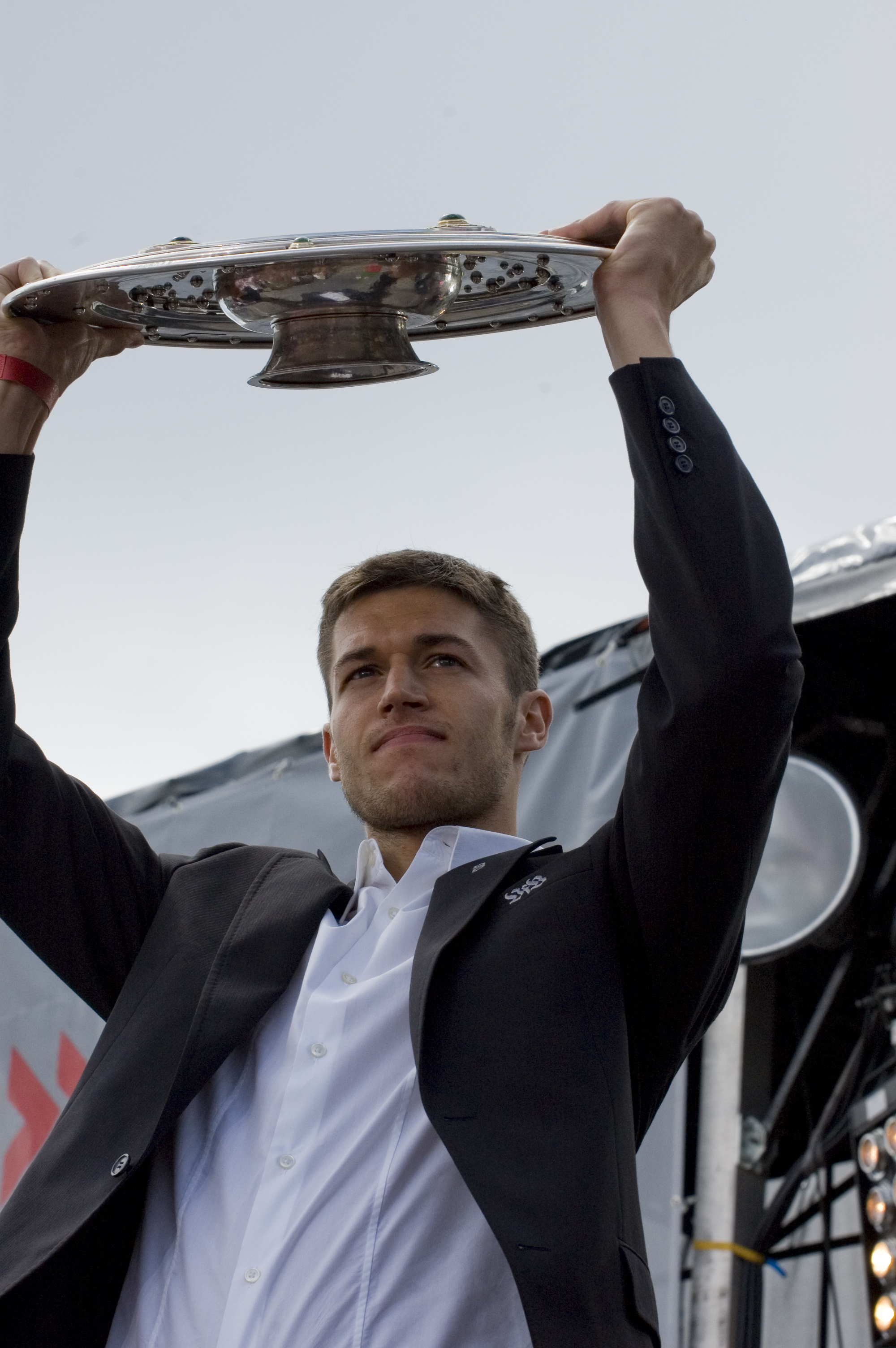
- Delpierre celebrating the league title in 2007.

Personal information
- Full name: Matthieu Delpierre
- Date of birth: 26 April 1981 (age 45)
- Place of birth: Nancy, France
- Height: 1.93 m (6 ft 4 in)
- Position: Centre back

Youth career
- 1992–1993: AC St-Brévin
- 1993–1994: Saint-Nazaire PFC
- 1994–1996: Nantes
- 1996–1999: Lille

Senior career*
Years	Team	Apps	(Gls)
1999–2004	Lille	83	(3)
2004–2007	VfB Stuttgart II	6	(0)
2004–2012	VfB Stuttgart	162	(3)
2012–2014	TSG 1899 Hoffenheim	23	(1)
2014	FC Utrecht	14	(0)
2014–2016	Melbourne Victory	41	(1)
Total		329	(8)

International career^{‡}
	France U18	2	(0)
	France U20	11	(0)
2002–2003	France U21	15	(0)
2008	France B	1	(0)
Medal record
Men's football
Representing France
UEFA European Under-21 Championship
Runner-up	2002 Switzerland
- * Club domestic league appearances and goals as of 27 March 2016 ‡ National team caps and goals as of 18 May 2015

Matthieu Delpierre (born 26 April 1981) is a French former professional footballer who played as a centre back.

Delpierre's professional career started with Lille OSC, before a move to VfB Stuttgart in Germany where he eventually became the club captain. Delpierre spent eight years at Stuttgart before moving on to TSG 1899 Hoffenheim, then FC Utrecht and ended his career in Australia with Melbourne Victory FC

He represented France at U18, U20 and under-21 level, making appearances during the 2002 UEFA European Under-21 Football Championship.

== Club career ==
=== Lille ===
In his first season with Lille, Delpierre made few appearances but helped in the club's promotion to Ligue 1. Delpierre played more regularly in his second season, helping Lille finish third and thereby qualify for the UEFA Champions League. Delpierre continued to perform well for Lille though the club finished at a lower position in the league every season.

=== VfB Stuttgart ===
Delpierre was signed by VfB Stuttgart on a free transfer after Lille refused to grant him a contract extension. Stuttgart struggled during the 2004–05 and 2005–06 seasons, but Delpierre began to improve under the tutelage of coach Armin Veh.

The following season, during which he missed only one game through illness, the French defender formed an almost impenetrable barrier alongside Fernando Meira at the heart of the Stuttgart defence. Matthieu has also been a vital cog in Stuttgart's success in the 2006–07 DFB-Pokal, in which the team conceded only three goals before losing the final to Nürnberg. On 19 May 2007, Delpierre won the German Bundesliga with Stuttgart, playing a significant part in their success.

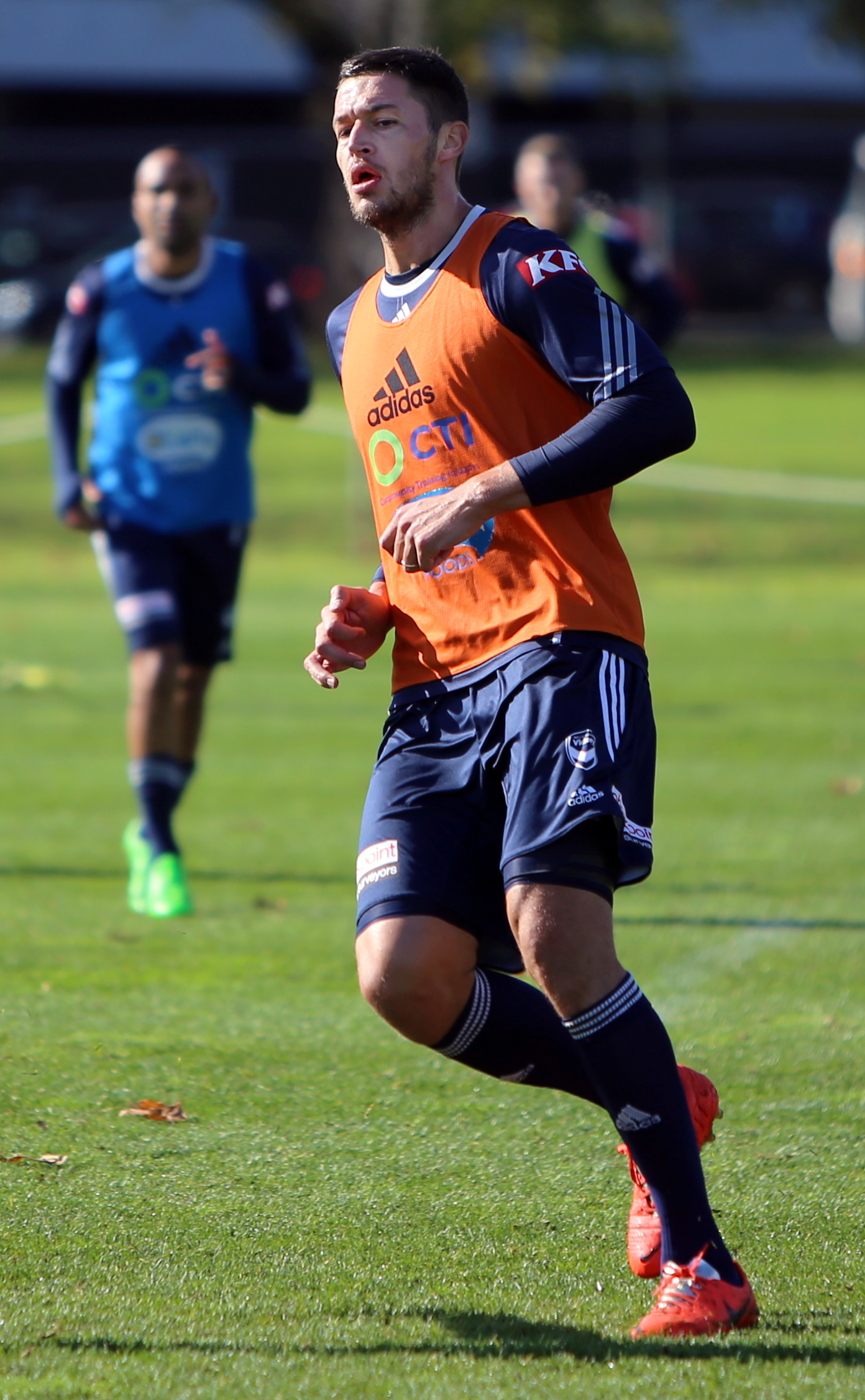
Matthieu Delpierre training for Melbourne Victory, May 2015

His defensive performances attracted the attention of Arsenal and Bayern Munich and also French clubs Marseille and Saint-Étienne. However, he remained at Stuttgart, extending his contract until the summer of 2012.

On 1 December 2009, Delpierre was appointed the new captain of VfB Stuttgart by Markus Babbel. On 12 January 2012 he asked Bruno Labbadia to appoint another player.

=== TSG Hoffenheim and FC Utrecht ===
In April 2012, it was announced that Delpierre would join Hoffenheim on a free transfer at the end of the season, on a two-year contract. He was demoted to the under-23 squad during the 2013–14 season.

Delpierre signed for FC Utrecht in January 2014.

=== Move to Australia ===
On 7 July 2014, A-League club Melbourne Victory announced the signing of Delpierre on a one-year deal.

On 10 October 2014, Delpierre scored the first goal of the 2014–15 A-League season in the Victory's first round match against the Western Sydney Wanderers, scoring from a Guilherme Finkler free kick in just the 8th minute of the match. The Victory eventually won the match 4–1.

On 1 May 2015, Delpierre extended his contract with Melbourne Victory for one more year.

Delpierre made 53 appearances in all competitions for the Victory during his two seasons in the A-League, scoring once.

On 26 April 2016, Delpierre announced his retirement from professional football at the age of 35, having completed 17 seasons since his debut with Lille in 1999.

== International career ==
Delpierre was called up to the senior France team in March 2008 but was ultimately never capped at that level.

== Career statistics ==
Appearances and goals by club, season and competition
Club	Season	League			National cup (Note: Includes Coupe de France, DFB-Pokal, FFA Cup)		League cup (Note: Includes Coupe de la Ligue, DFL-Ligapokal)		Continental		Total	
Club	Season	Division	Apps	Goals	Apps	Goals	Apps	Goals	Apps	Goals	Apps	Goals
Lille	1999–2000	Division 2	2	0	1	0	0	0	—		3	0
Lille	2000–01	Division 1	8	0	0	0	0	0	—		8	0
Lille	2001–02	Division 1	25	0	1	0	1	0	7 (Note: 3 appearances in UEFA Champions League, 4 appearances in UEFA Cup)	0	34	0
Lille	2002–03	Ligue 1	31	3	1	0	2	0	6 (Note: Appearances in UEFA Intertoto Cup)	0	40	3
Lille	2003–04	Ligue 1	17	0	1	0	2	0	—		20	0
Lille	Total		83	3	4	0	5	0	13	0	105	3
VfB Stuttgart	2004–05	Bundesliga	10	1	1	0	0	0	3 (Note: Appearances in UEFA Cup)	0	14	1
VfB Stuttgart	2005–06	Bundesliga	29	0	0	0	2	0	8	0	39	0
VfB Stuttgart	2006–07	Bundesliga	33	0	6	1	—		—		39	1
VfB Stuttgart	2007–08	Bundesliga	22	0	3	0	0	0	3 (Note: Appearances in UEFA Champions League)	0	28	0
VfB Stuttgart	2008–09	Bundesliga	22	1	2	0	—		7 (Note: 2 appearances in UEFA Intertoto Cup, 5 appearances in UEFA Cup)	0	31	1
VfB Stuttgart	2009–10	Bundesliga	27	0	3	0	—		9	0	39	0
VfB Stuttgart	2010–11	Bundesliga	18	1	1	1	—		4 (Note: Appearances in UEFA Europa League)	0	23	2
VfB Stuttgart	2011–12	Bundesliga	1	0	0	0	—		—		1	0
VfB Stuttgart	Total		162	3	16	2	2	0	34	0	214	5
VfB Stuttgart II	2004–05	Regionalliga Süd	3	0	—		—		—		3	0
VfB Stuttgart II	2007–08	Regionalliga Süd	1	0	—		—		—		1	0
VfB Stuttgart II	2011–12	3. Liga	2	0	—		—		—		2	0
VfB Stuttgart II	Total		6	0	0	0	0	0	0	0	6	0
TSG 1899 Hoffenheim	2012–13	Bundesliga	23	1	1	0	—		—		24	1
FC Utrecht	2013–14	Eredivisie	14	0	—		—		—		14	0
Melbourne Victory	2014–15	A-League	15	1	1	0	—		—		16	1
Melbourne Victory	2015–16	A-League	26	0	0	0	—		8 (Note: Appearances in AFC Champions League)	0	34	0
Melbourne Victory	Total		41	1	1	0	0	0	8	0	50	1
Career total			329	8	22	2	7	0	55	0	413	10

== Honours ==
=== Club ===
Lille

- Ligue 2: 1999–2000

Stuttgart

- Bundesliga: 2006–07

Melbourne Victory

- A-League Championship: 2014–15
- A-League Premiership: 2014–15
- FFA Cup: 2015

Individual

- PFA Team of the Season: 2014–15, 2015–16
- Victory Medal: 2015–16
- Players' Player of the Year: 2015–16
