= 2008–09 Olympique de Marseille season =

Marseille
2008–09 season
- Chairman: Pape Diouf
- Manager: Eric Gerets
- Stadium: Stade Vélodrome
- Ligue 1: 2nd
- Coupe de France: Round of 32
- Coupe de la Ligue: Third round
- Champions League: Group stage
- UEFA Cup: Quarter-finals
- Top goalscorer: League: Mamadou Niang (13 goals); All: Mamadou Niang (20 goals)
Home colours	Away colours	Third colours

During the 2008–09 French football season, Olympique de Marseille competed in Ligue 1.

== Season summary ==
Marseille finished 3 points behind league champions Bordeaux. Manager Eric Gerets left after his contract expired at the end of the season. Replacing him was former Marseille player Didier Deschamps.

== First-team squad ==
Squad at end of season

Note: Flags indicate national team as defined under FIFA eligibility rules; some limited exceptions apply. Players may hold more than one non-FIFA nationality.

No.	Pos.	Nation	Player
1	GK	FRA	Rudy Riou
2	DF	ARG	Renato Civelli
3	DF	NGR	Taye Taiwo
4	DF	FRA	Julien Rodriguez
5	DF	BRA	Hilton
6	MF	ALG	Karim Ziani (Note: Ziani was born in Sèvres, France, but also qualifies to represent Algeria internationally through his father, and made his international debut for Algeria in 2003.)
7	MF	FRA	Benoît Cheyrou
8	DF	ENG	Tyrone Mears (Note: Mears was born in Stockport, England, but also believed he was eligible to represent Jamaica internationally through his father and would make his international debut for Jamaica in February 2009. It was later discovered that Mears' father was from Sierra Leone and was thus ineligible to represent Jamaica.) (on loan from Derby County)
9	FW	BRA	Brandão
10	MF	NED	Boudewijn Zenden
11	FW	SEN	Mamadou Niang
12	MF	BFA	Charles Kaboré
14	MF	CIV	Bakari Koné

No.	Pos.	Nation	Player
15	DF	GLP	Ronald Zubar
16	GK	FRA	Hilaire Muñoz
17	FW	MLI	Mamadou Samassa (Note: Samassa was born in Montfermeil, France, and represented them at U-21 level, but also qualifies to represent Mali internationally through his parents, declared for Mali internationally during the season, and would make his international debut for Mali in 2009.)
19	MF	ALB	Lorik Cana (Note: Cana was born in Pristina, Yugoslavia (now Kosovo).)
20	MF	FRA	Hatem Ben Arfa
22	MF	FRA	Sylvain Wiltord
23	MF	CMR	Modeste M'bami
24	DF	FRA	Laurent Bonnart
26	MF	FRA	Mohamed Amine Dennoun
28	MF	FRA	Mathieu Valbuena
30	GK	FRA	Steve Mandanda (Note: Mandanda was born in Kinshasa, Zaire (now the Democratic Republic of the Congo), but also qualifies to represent France internationally and made his international debut for France in May 2008.)
31	FW	FRA	Guy Gnabouyou
40	GK	UKR	Dmytro Nepohodov

=== Left club during season ===
Note: Flags indicate national team as defined under FIFA eligibility rules; some limited exceptions apply. Players may hold more than one non-FIFA nationality.

No.	Pos.	Nation	Player
8	FW	GHA	André Ayew (Note: Ayew was born in Seclin, France, but also qualifies to represent Ghana internationally through his father and made his international debut for Ghana in August 2007.) (on loan to Lorient)
9	FW	FRA	Djibril Cissé (on loan to Sunderland)
13	DF	SEN	Leyti N'Diaye (on loan to AC Ajaccio)
17	MF	ALG	Salim Arrache (Note: Arrache was born in Marseille, France, but also qualifies to represent Algeria internationally through his parents, and made his international debut for Algeria in April 2004.) (on loan to Stade de Reims)
18	MF	FRA	Elliot Grandin (on loan to GF38)
21	MF	SRB	Miloš Krstić (on loan to AC Ajaccio)

No.	Pos.	Nation	Player
22	DF	MAR	Amin Erbati (to Al Wahda)
25	DF	SLO	Boštjan Cesar (to AC Ajaccio)
27	DF	SEN	Pape M'Bow (on loan to Cannes)
29	DF	FRA	Fabrice Begeorgi (on loan to SV Werder Bremen II)
32	DF	FRA	Gaël Givet (on loan to Blackburn Rovers)

== Competitions ==
=== Ligue 1 ===
==== League table ====
Pos	Team	Pld	W	D	L	GF	GA	GD	Pts	Qualification or relegation
1	Bordeaux (C)	38	24	8	6	64	34	+30	80	Qualification to Champions League group stage
2	Marseille	38	22	11	5	67	35	+32	77	Qualification to Champions League group stage
3	Lyon	38	20	11	7	52	29	+23	71	Qualification to Champions League play-off round
4	Toulouse	38	16	16	6	45	27	+18	64	Qualification to Europa League play-off round
5	Lille	38	17	13	8	51	39	+12	64	Qualification to Europa League third qualifying round

Source: Ligue 1
Rules for classification: 1) points; 2) goal difference; 3) number of goals scored.
France's third UEFA Europa League spot went to Ligue 2 side Guingamp, winners of 2008–09 Coupe de France.
(C) Champions

==== Results summary ====
Overall								Home						Away					
Pld	W	D	L	GF	GA	GD	Pts	W	D	L	GF	GA	GD	W	D	L	GF	GA	GD
38	22	11	5	67	35	+32	77	10	5	4	35	22	+13	12	6	1	32	13	+19

Source: LFP.fr

==== Results by round ====
Round	1	2	3	4	5	6	7	8	9	10	11	12	13	14	15	16	17	18	19	20	21	22	23	24	25	26	27	28	29	30	31	32	33	34	35	36	37	38
Ground	A	H	A	H	A	H	A	H	A	H	A	H	A	H	H	A	H	A	H	A	H	A	H	A	H	A	H	A	H	A	H	A	A	H	A	H	A	H
Result	D	W	W	W	D	D	D	W	W	L	D	W	W	L	D	D	W	D	L	W	W	L	W	W	D	W	D	W	W	W	W	W	W	D	W	L	W	W
Position	9	2	1	1	2	2	3	3	2	2	4	2	2	2	3	3	2	2	5	4	3	4	4	3	3	3	3	2	2	2	1	1	1	1	1	2	2	2

Source: LFP.fr
A = Away; H = Home; W = Win; D = Draw; L = Loss

==== Matches ====
Win Draw Loss

9 August 2008 1	Rennes	4–4	Marseille	Rennes
21:00	Thomert 7', 51'; Mandanda 90' (o.g.); Cheyrou 90+3'		Koné 13'; Ben Arfa 15'; Niang 28'; Grandin 90+2'	Stadium: Stade de la Route de Lorient; Attendance: 28,879; Referee: Thierry Auriac

17 August 2008 2	Marseille	4–0	Auxerre	Marseille
21:00	Niang 17'; Grichting 63' (o.g.); Grandin 76'; Zenden 86'			Stadium: Stade Vélodrome; Attendance: 55,776; Referee: Philippe Kalt

23 August 2008 3	Le Havre	0–1	Marseille	Le Havre
19:00			Zenden 56'; Zubar (red card) 90'	Stadium: Stade Jules Deschaseaux; Attendance: 16,378; Referee: Tony Chapron

30 August 2008 4	Marseille	2–1	Sochaux	Marseille
21:00	Ziani 39'; Koné 60'		Erdinç 73'	Stadium: Stade Vélodrome; Attendance: 55,704; Referee: Saïd Ennjimi

13 September 2008 5	Bordeaux	1–1	Marseille	Bordeaux
21:00	Chamakh 25'		Koné 2'	Stadium: Stade Chaban-Delmas; Attendance: 32,854; Referee: Bertrand Layec

21 September 2008 6	Marseille	0–0	Monaco	Marseille
21:00				Stadium: Stade Vélodrome; Attendance: 51,342; Referee: Stéphane Lannoy

27 September 2008 7	Le Mans	1–1	Marseille	Le Mans
19:00	Helstad 10'		Ben Arfa 7'	Stadium: Stade Léon-Bollée; Attendance: 16,221; Referee: Frédy Fautrel

4 October 2008 8	Marseille	2–1	Caen	Marseille
19:00	Ben Arfa 2'; Niang 60'; Ziani (red card) 70'		Savidan 20'	Stadium: Stade Vélodrome; Attendance: 51,915; Referee: Antony Gautier

19 October 2008 9	Valenciennes	1–3	Marseille	Valenciennes
21:00	Pujol 81'		Koné 13'; Ben Arfa 73'; Kaboré 9024'	Stadium: Stade Nungesser; Attendance: 16,192; Referee: Lionel Jaffredo

26 October 2008 10	Marseille	2–4	Paris Saint-Germain	Marseille
21:00	Niang 21'; Valbuena 45'		Hoarau 10', 82'; Luyindula 53'; Rothen 76'	Stadium: Stade Vélodrome; Attendance: 56,426; Referee: Laurent Duhamel

29 October 2008 11	Nantes	1–1	Marseille	Nantes
19:00	Maréval 44'		Koné 78'	Stadium: Stade de la Beaujoire; Attendance: 35,993; Referee: Hervé Piccirillo

1 November 2008 12	Marseille	3–1	Saint-Étienne	Marseille
21:00	Cheyrou 20'; Ben Arfa 37' (pen.); Taiwo 71'		Gomis 22'	Stadium: Stade Vélodrome; Attendance: 54,715; Referee: Damien Ledentu

8 November 2008 13	Grenoble	0–3	Marseille	Grenoble
19:00			Ben Arfa 4'; Koné 32'; Cheyrou 82'	Stadium: Stade des Alpes; Attendance: 19,648; Referee: Thierry Auriac

15 November 2008 14	Marseille	2–3	Lorient	Marseille
19:00	Ziani 10'; Niang 60' (pen.)		Amalfitano 76'; Abriel 84'; Gameiro 88'	Stadium: Stade Vélodrome; Attendance: 48,878; Referee: Tony Chapron

23 November 2008 15	Marseille	2–2	Lille	Marseille
21:00	Samassa 47'; Zenden 90+2'		Rami 11'; Bastos 37'	Stadium: Stade Vélodrome; Attendance: 46,145; Referee: Clément Turpin

30 November 2008 16	Toulouse	0–0	Marseille	Toulouse
17:00				Stadium: Stadium de Toulouse; Attendance: 33,572; Referee: Bertrand Layec

6 December 2008 17	Marseille	2–1	Nice	Marseille
19:00	Echouafni 14' (o.g.); Niang 45' (pen.)		Bamogo 48'	Stadium: Stade Vélodrome; Attendance: 50,279; Referee: Stéphane Lannoy

14 December 2008 18	Lyon	0–0	Marseille	Lyon
21:00				Stadium: Stade de Gerland; Attendance: 39,638; Referee: Stéphane Bré

21 December 2008 19	Marseille	0–3	Nancy	Marseille
17:00			Hadji 34', 39'; Dia 56'	Stadium: Stade Vélodrome; Attendance: 50,628; Referee: Thierry Auriac

10 January 2009 20	Auxerre	0–2	Marseille	Auxerre
21:00			Samassa 31'; Valbuena 78'	Stadium: Stade de l'Abbé-Deschamps; Attendance: 19,269; Referee: Saïd Ennjimi

17 January 2009 21	Marseille	2–0	Le Havre	Marseille
19:00	Valbuena 25'; Zubar 60'			Stadium: Stade Vélodrome; Attendance: 45,721; Referee: Philippe Malige

1 February 2009 22	Sochaux	1–0	Marseille	Montbéliard
17:00	Erdinç 24'			Stadium: Stade Auguste Bonal; Attendance: 19,972; Referee: Lionel Jaffredo

8 February 2009 23	Marseille	1–0	Bordeaux	Marseille
21:00	Chamakh 57' (o.g.)		Diawara (red card) 86'	Stadium: Stade Vélodrome; Attendance: 53,856; Referee: Stéphane Bré

15 February 2009 24	Monaco	0–1	Marseille	Monaco
21:00			Koné 77'	Stadium: Stade Louis II; Attendance: 13,475; Referee: Antony Gautier

22 February 2009 25	Marseille	0–0	Le Mans	Marseille
17:00				Stadium: Stade Vélodrome; Attendance: 48,680; Referee: Olivier Thual

1 March 2009 26	Caen	0–1	Marseille	Caen
17:00			Brandão 67'	Stadium: Stade Michel d'Ornano; Attendance: 20,775; Referee: Thierry Auriac

7 March 2009 27	Marseille	0–0	Valenciennes	Marseille
19:00				Stadium: Stade Vélodrome; Attendance: 48,746; Referee: Jean-Charles Cailleux

15 March 2009 28	Paris Saint-Germain	1–3	Marseille	Paris
21:00	Giuly 43'; Camara (red card) 53'		Zenden 24'; Koné 55'; Cana 60'	Stadium: Parc des Princes; Attendance: 45,774; Referee: Bertrand Layec

21 March 2009 29	Marseille	2–0	Nantes	Marseille
21:00	Civelli 55'; Brandão 59'			Stadium: Stade Vélodrome; Attendance: 47,747; Referee: Saïd Ennjimi

5 April 2009 30	Saint-Étienne	0–3	Marseille	Saint-Étienne
21:00			Niang 60' (pen.), 76'; Brandão 73'	Stadium: Stade Geoffroy-Guichard; Attendance: 34,734; Referee: Philippe Kalt

12 April 2009 31	Marseille	4–1	Grenoble	Marseille
17:00	Taiwo 52' (pen.), 65'; Hilton 56'; Brandão 89'		Courtois 90+3'	Stadium: Stade Vélodrome; Attendance: 56,953; Referee: Philippe Malige

19 April 2009 32	Lorient	1–2	Marseille	Lorient
17:00	Gameiro 8'; Le Lan (red card) 89'		Civelli 59'; Brandão 80'; Cana (red card) 89'	Stadium: Stade du Moustoir; Attendance: 13,093; Referee: Olivier Thual

26 April 2009 33	Lille	1–2	Marseille	Villeneuve d'Ascq
21:00	Hazard 49'		Cheyrou 54'; Niang 56'	Stadium: Stadium Lille-Metropole; Attendance: 17,076; Referee: Laurent Duhamel

2 May 2009 34	Marseille	2–2	Toulouse	Marseille
21:00	Niang 63'; Cetto 73' (o.g.)		Gignac 48', 72'	Stadium: Stade Vélodrome; Attendance: 55,823; Referee: Antony Gautier

13 May 2009 35	Nice	0–2	Marseille	Nice
19:00			Niang 26'; Brandão 60'	Stadium: Stade du Ray; Attendance: 16,669; Referee: Stéphane Bré

17 May 2009 36	Marseille	1–3	Lyon	Marseille
21:00	Wiltord 80'		Benzema 31' (pen.), 42'; Juninho 90+1'	Stadium: Stade Vélodrome; Attendance: 56,498; Referee: Stéphane Lannoy

23 May 2009 37	Nancy	1–2	Marseille	Tomblaine
21:00	N'Guémo 88'		Macaluso 32' (o.g.); Brandão 56'	Stadium: Stade Marcel Picot; Attendance: 20,017; Referee: Bertrand Layec

30 May 2009 38	Marseille	4–0	Rennes	Marseille
21:00	Koné 53'; Niang 57', 72'; Douchez 58' (o.g.)			Stadium: Stade Vélodrome; Attendance: 55,873; Referee: Saïd Ennjimi

=== Coupe de France ===
4 January 2009 Round of 64	Besançon	1–1 (4–5 p)	Marseille	Besançon
20:45	Zubar 67' (o.g.)		Taiwo 83' (pen.)	Stadium: Stade Léo Lagrange; Attendance: 10,334; Referee: Jean-Charles Cailleux
	Penalties
	Lamy (penalty scored); Bourillon (penalty scored); Gamondes (penalty scored); Hakkar (penalty missed); Rangdet (penalty missed)		(penalty scored) Taiwo; (penalty scored) Bonnart; (penalty scored) Ziani; (penalty scored) Koné; (penalty scored) Cheyrou

28 January 2009 Round of 32	Lyon	1–0	Marseille	Lyon
20:45	Benzema 2'; Keïta (red card) 64'			Stadium: Stade de Gerland; Attendance: 28,304; Referee: Laurent Duhamel

=== Coupe de la Ligue ===
24 September 2008 Round of 16	Sochaux	1–0	Marseille	Montbéliard
21:00	Erdinç 75'			Stadium: Stade Auguste Bonal; Attendance: 12,946; Referee: Olivier Thual

=== Champions League ===
==== Third qualifying round ====
13 August 2008 First leg	Brann (Norway)	0–1	(France) Marseille	Bergen, Norway
20:45 CET		Report	Cheyrou 40'	Stadium: Brann Stadion; Attendance: 11,197; Referee: Alexandru Tudor (Romania)

27 August 2008 Second leg	Marseille (France)	2–1 (3–1 agg.)	(Norway) Brann	Marseille, France
20:45 CET	Niang 65', 90'	Report	Sigurðsson 74'	Stadium: Stade Vélodrome; Attendance: 44,641; Referee: Eric Braamhaar (Netherlands)

==== Group C ====
Pos	Team	Pld	W	D	L	GF	GA	GD	Pts	Qualification
1	(England) Liverpool	6	4	2	0	11	5	+6	14	Advance to knockout phase
2	(Spain) Atlético Madrid	6	3	3	0	9	4	+5	12	Advance to knockout phase
3	(France) Marseille	6	1	1	4	5	7	−2	4	Transfer to UEFA Cup
4	(Netherlands) PSV Eindhoven	6	1	0	5	5	14	−9	3	

Source: RSSSF

16 September 2008 1	Marseille (France)	1–2	(England) Liverpool	Marseille, France
20:45	Cana 23'	Report	Gerrard 26', 32' (pen.)	Stadium: Stade Vélodrome; Attendance: 44,841; Referee: Konrad Plautz (Austria)

1 October 2008 2	Atlético Madrid (Spain)	2–1	(France) Marseille	Madrid, Spain
20:45	Agüero 4'; R. García 22'	Report	Niang 16'	Stadium: Vicente Calderón Stadium; Attendance: 39,898; Referee: Tom Henning Øvrebø (Norway)

22 October 2008 3	PSV Eindhoven (Netherlands)	2–0	(France) Marseille	Eindhoven, Netherlands
20:45	Koevermans 71', 85'	Report		Stadium: Philips Stadion; Attendance: 29,000; Referee: Damir Skomina (Slovenia)

4 November 2008 4	Marseille (France)	3–0	(Netherlands) PSV Eindhoven	Marseille, France
20:45	Koné 30'; Niang 63', 71'	Report		Stadium: Stade Vélodrome; Attendance: 48,777; Referee: Nicola Rizzoli (Italy)

26 November 2008 5	Liverpool (England)	1–0	(France) Marseille	Liverpool, England
20:45	Gerrard 23'	Report		Stadium: Anfield; Attendance: 40,024; Referee: Olegário Benquerença (Portugal)

9 December 2008 6	Marseille (France)	0–0	(Spain) Atlético Madrid	Marseille, France
20:45		Report		Stadium: Stade Vélodrome; Attendance: 49,663; Referee: Wolfgang Stark (Germany)

=== UEFA Cup ===
==== Round of 32 ====
19 February 2009 First leg	Marseille (France)	0–1	(Netherlands) Twente	Marseille, France
20:45		Report	Arnautović 22'	Stadium: Stade Vélodrome; Attendance: 22,616; Referee: Stanislav Sukhina (Russia)

26 February 2009 Second leg	Twente (Netherlands)	0–1 (a.e.t.) (1–1 agg.) (6–7 p)	(France) Marseille	Enschede, Netherlands
18:30		Report	Ben Arfa 24'	Stadium: De Grolsch Veste; Attendance: 24,000; Referee: Alon Yefet (Israel)
	Penalties
	N'Kufo (penalty missed); Perez (penalty scored); Janssen (penalty scored); Hersi (penalty scored); Arnautović (penalty scored); Braafheid (penalty scored); Douglas (penalty scored); Rajković (penalty missed)		(penalty scored) Taiwo; (penalty scored) Niang; (penalty scored) Ben Arfa; (penalty scored) Koné; (penalty missed) Ziani; (penalty scored) Cheyrou; (penalty scored) Bonnart; (penalty scored) M'bami

==== Round of 16 ====
12 March 2009 First leg	Marseille (France)	2–1	(Netherlands) Ajax	Marseille, France
20:45	Cheyrou 19'; Niang 33'	Report	Suárez 36' (pen.)	Stadium: Stade Vélodrome; Attendance: 27,829; Referee: Ivan Bebek (Croatia)

18 March 2009 Second leg	Ajax (Netherlands)	2–2 (a.e.t.) (3–4 agg.)	(France) Marseille	Amsterdam, Netherlands
20:45	Enoh 33'; Sulejmani 74'	Report	Niang 35'; Mears 110'	Stadium: Amsterdam Arena; Attendance: 47,650; Referee: Florian Meyer (Germany)

==== Quarter-finals ====
9 April 2009 First leg	Shakhtar Donetsk (Ukraine)	2–0	(France) Marseille	Donetsk, Ukraine
18:30	Hübschman 39'; Jádson 65'	Report		Stadium: RSK Olimpiyskyi; Attendance: 25,500; Referee: Felix Brych (Germany)

16 April 2009 Second leg	Marseille (France)	1–2 (1–4 agg.)	(Ukraine) Shakhtar Donetsk	Marseille, France
20:45	Ben Arfa 43'	Report	Fernandinho 30'; Luiz Adriano 90+3'	Stadium: Stade Vélodrome; Attendance: 48,268; Referee: Manuel Mejuto González (Spain)
