= Cheyrou =

Cheyrou is a surname. Notable people with the surname include:

- Benoît Cheyrou (born 1981), French footballer
- Bruno Cheyrou (born 1978), French footballer
