= List of English football transfers summer 2006 =

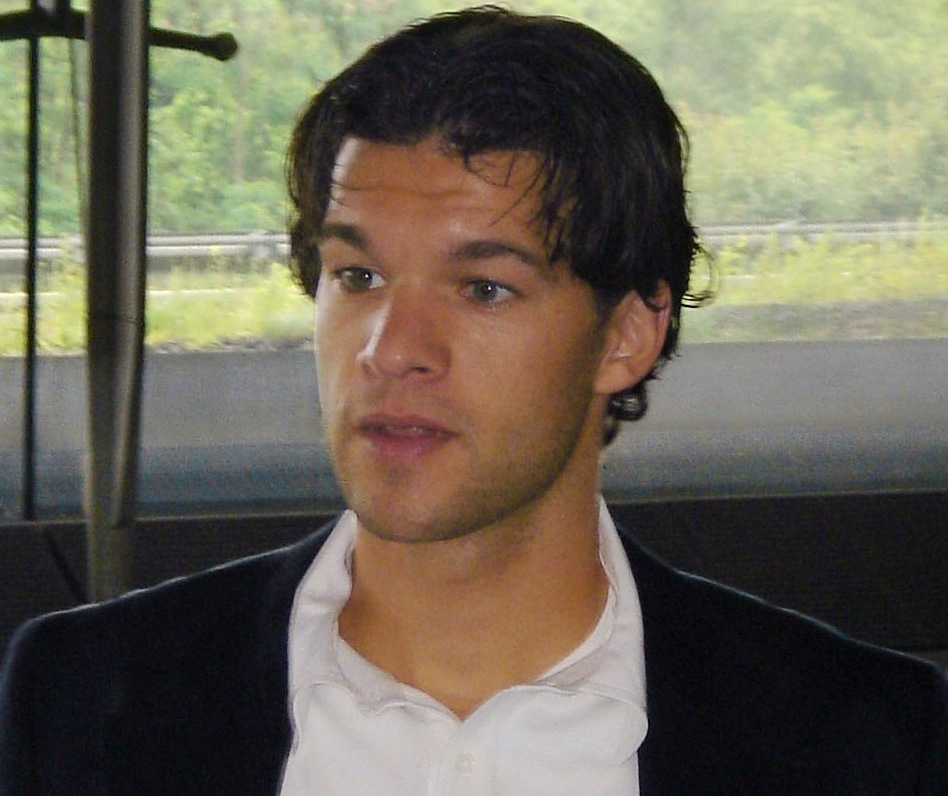
Michael Ballack's arrival at Chelsea was one of the most high-profile transfers of the summer.

This is a list of English football transfers for the 2006–07 season. Only moves from the Premier League and Championship, as well as any other prominent moves from the lower leagues, are listed.

The summer transfer window ran from the end of the 2005–06 season, with a few transfers taking place prior to the season's complete end; the first prominent move went through on 2 May. The window closed on 31 August 2006. The mid-season transfer window opened on 1 January 2007, and ran for the entire month, until 31 January. Players without a club could join one, either during or in between transfer windows. Clubs below Premier League level could also sign players on loan at any time. If need be, clubs could sign a goalkeeper on an emergency loan, if all others were unavailable.

Chelsea broke the record for the highest transfer fee paid by an English club, as well as their own transfer record when they paid £30 million for Andriy Shevchenko, slightly eclipsing the £29.1 million Manchester United paid for Rio Ferdinand in 2002. It also became the sixth-highest transfer fee of all time. Dietmar Hamann's transfer to Bolton Wanderers became the shortest in English footballing history, with him only being at the club for one day, before having a "change of heart" and joining Manchester City the following day. In total, Premiership clubs spent the highest amount on transfers in the summer since the transfer window system was introduced.

== Summer transfer window ==
- Clubs are English unless noted

Date	Name	Nat	Moving from	Moving to	Fee
2 May 2006	Grzegorz Rasiak	(Poland)	Tottenham Hotspur	Southampton	£2m
6 May 2006	DJ Campbell	(England)	Brentford	Birmingham City	£2m
8 May 2006	Jimmy Bullard	(England)	Wigan Athletic	Fulham	£2.5m
15 May 2006	Michael Ballack	(Germany)	(Germany) Bayern Munich	Chelsea	Free
23 May 2006	Tomáš Rosický	(Czech Republic)	(Germany) Borussia Dortmund	Arsenal	£6.8m
24 May 2006	David Sommeil	(France)	Manchester City	Sheffield United	Free
25 May 2006	Robert Pires	(France)	Arsenal	(Spain) Villarreal	Free
26 May 2006	Paul Dickov	(Scotland)	Blackburn Rovers	Manchester City	Free
30 May 2006	Andrew Johnson	(England)	Crystal Palace	Everton	£8.6m
30 May 2006	Salomon Kalou	(Ivory Coast)	(Netherlands) Feyenoord	Chelsea	Undisclosed
31 May 2006	Andriy Shevchenko	(Ukraine)	(Italy) A.C. Milan	Chelsea	£30m
31 May 2006	Cameron Jerome	(England)	(Wales) Cardiff City	Birmingham City	£3m
1 June 2006	Henrique Hilário	(Portugal)	(Portugal) Nacional Madeira	Chelsea	Free
1 June 2006	Andy Gray	(Scotland)	Sunderland	Burnley	£750k
2 June 2006	Mikel John Obi	(Nigeria)	Manchester United	Chelsea	£16m
6 June 2006	Juan Sebastián Verón	(Argentina)	Chelsea	(Argentina) Estudiantes	Two-season long loan
8 June 2006	Lee Bowyer	(England)	Newcastle United	West Ham United	£3.5m
14 June 2006	Michael Chopra	(England)	Newcastle United	(Wales) Cardiff City	£500k
14 June 2006	Joleon Lescott	(England)	Wolverhampton Wanderers	Everton	£5m
14 June 2006	Claude Davis	(Jamaica)	Preston North End	Sheffield United	£3.5m
14 June 2006	Eiður Guðjohnsen	(Iceland)	Chelsea	(Spain) Barcelona	£8m
15 June 2006	Jonathan Spector	(United States)	Manchester United	West Ham United	£500k
19 June 2006	Jiri Jarosik	(Czech Republic)	Chelsea	(Scotland) Celtic	Undisclosed
21 June 2006	Ousmane Dabo	(France)	(Italy) Lazio	Manchester City	Free
22 June 2006	Craig Bellamy	(Wales)	Blackburn Rovers	Liverpool	£6m
26 June 2006	Danny Pugh	(England)	Leeds United	Preston North End	£250k
26 June 2006	Jason Brown	(Wales)	Gillingham	Blackburn Rovers	Free
26 June 2006	Fitz Hall	(England)	Crystal Palace	Wigan Athletic	£3m
26 June 2006	John Hartson	(Wales)	(Scotland) Celtic	West Bromwich Albion	Undisclosed
26 June 2006	Stephen Kelly	(Republic of Ireland)	Tottenham Hotspur	Birmingham City	£750k
26 June 2006	Glen Johnson	(England)	Chelsea	Portsmouth	Season-long loan
26 June 2006	Aki Riihilahti	(Finland)	Crystal Palace	(Germany) Kaiserslautern	Free
29 June 2006	Colin Cameron	(Scotland)	Wolverhampton Wanderers	Coventry City	Free
30 June 2006	Bruno Cheyrou	(France)	Liverpool	(France) Rennes	Undisclosed
30 June 2006	Leon Cort	(England)	Hull City	Crystal Palace	£1.25m
30 June 2006	Chris Powell	(England)	Charlton Athletic	Watford	Free
30 June 2006	Didier Zokora	(Ivory Coast)	(France) Saint-Étienne	Tottenham Hotspur	£8.2m
1 July 2006	Gabriel Paletta	(Argentina)	(Argentina) Banfield	Liverpool	Undisclosed
1 July 2006	David Bellion	(France)	Manchester United	(France) Nice	Undisclosed
1 July 2006	Kenny Miller	(Scotland)	Wolverhampton Wanderers	(Scotland) Celtic	Free
1 July 2006	Tim Howard	(United States)	Manchester United	Everton	Season-long loan
1 July 2006	Dimitar Berbatov	(Bulgaria)	(Germany) Bayer Leverkusen	Tottenham Hotspur	£10.9m
3 July 2006	Francis Jeffers	(England)	Charlton Athletic	Blackburn Rovers	Free
3 July 2006	Jason Roberts	(Grenada)	Wigan Athletic	Blackburn Rovers	Undisclosed
4 July 2006	Chris Perry	(England)	Charlton Athletic	West Bromwich Albion	Free
4 July 2006	Mikele Leigertwood	(England)	Crystal Palace	Sheffield United	£600k
5 July 2006	Shaka Hislop	(Trinidad and Tobago)	West Ham United	(United States) Major League Soccer (FC Dallas)	Free
5 July 2006	Bradley Wright-Phillips	(England)	Manchester City	Southampton	Undisclosed
5 July 2006	Stan Lazaridis	(Australia)	Birmingham City	(Australia) Perth Glory	Free
5 July 2006	Fábio Aurélio	(Brazil)	(Spain) Valencia	Liverpool	Free
5 July 2006	Fernando Morientes	(Spain)	Liverpool	(Spain) Valencia	£3m
5 July 2006	Carlton Cole	(England)	Chelsea	West Ham United	Undisclosed
6 July 2006	Tyrone Mears	(England)	Preston North End	West Ham United	£1m
6 July 2006	Bruno Ngotty	(France)	Bolton Wanderers	Birmingham City	Free
6 July 2006	Li Tie	(China)	Everton	Sheffield United	Free
7 July 2006	Emile Heskey	(England)	Birmingham City	Wigan Athletic	£5.5m
11 July 2006	Jimmy Floyd Hasselbaink	(Netherlands)	Middlesbrough	Charlton Athletic	Free
11 July 2006	Chris Kirkland	(England)	Liverpool	Wigan Athletic	Six-month loan
11 July 2006	Seol Ki-Hyeon	(South Korea)	Wolverhampton Wanderers	Reading	£1.5m
11 July 2006	Gabriel Zakuani	(Democratic Republic of the Congo)	Leyton Orient	Fulham	£1.5m
11 July 2006	Mark Kennedy	(Republic of Ireland)	Wolverhampton Wanderers	Crystal Palace	Free
11 July 2006	Paul Smith	(England)	Southampton	Nottingham Forest	£500k
11 July 2006	Dietmar Hamann	(Germany)	Liverpool	Bolton Wanderers	Free
12 July 2006	Dietmar Hamann	(Germany)	Bolton Wanderers	Manchester City	Free
12 July 2006	Djibril Cissé	(France)	Liverpool	(France) Marseille	Season-long loan
12 July 2006	Damien Francis	(Jamaica)	Wigan Athletic	Watford	£1.5m
12 July 2006	Björn Runström	(Sweden)	(Sweden) Hammarby	Fulham	Undisclosed
14 July 2006	Sam Sodje	(Nigeria)	Brentford	Reading	£350k
14 July 2006	Abdoulaye Méïté	(Ivory Coast)	(France) Marseille	Bolton Wanderers	Undisclosed
14 July 2006	Dean Marney	(England)	Tottenham Hotspur	Hull City	Undisclosed
18 July 2006	Denny Landzaat	(Netherlands)	(Netherlands) AZ Alkmaar	Wigan Athletic	Undisclosed
18 July 2006	Jay-Jay Okocha	(Nigeria)	Bolton Wanderers	Qatar Sports Club	Free
19 July 2006	Kenny Cunningham	(Republic of Ireland)	Birmingham City	Sunderland	Free
19 July 2006	Pedro Pelé	(Cape Verde)	(Portugal) Belenenses	Southampton	Undisclosed
20 July 2006	Bernardo Corradi	(Italy)	(Spain) Valencia	Manchester City	Undisclosed
20 July 2006	Gary Breen	(Republic of Ireland)	Sunderland	Wolverhampton Wanderers	Free
20 July 2006	Barry Hayles	(Jamaica)	Millwall	Plymouth Argyle	£100k
21 July 2006	Kelvin Davis	(England)	Sunderland	Southampton	£1m
21 July 2006	David Livermore	(England)	Millwall	Leeds United	Undisclosed
22 July 2006	Damien Duff	(Republic of Ireland)	Chelsea	Newcastle United	£5m
22 July 2006	Asier del Horno	(Spain)	Chelsea	(Spain) Valencia	£4.8m
24 July 2006	Rob Hulse	(England)	Leeds United	Sheffield United	£2.2m
25 July 2006	James Scowcroft	(England)	Coventry City	Crystal Palace	£500k
26 July 2006	Sander Westerveld	(Netherlands)	Portsmouth	(Spain) UD Almería	Free
26 July 2006	Julio Arca	(Argentina)	Sunderland	Middlesbrough	£1.75m
26 July 2006	Quinton Fortune	(South Africa)	Manchester United	Bolton Wanderers	Free
26 July 2006	Jermaine Pennant	(England)	Birmingham City	Liverpool	£6.7m
26 July 2006	Kevin Nicholls	(England)	Luton Town	Leeds United	£700k
27 July 2006	Jay Bothroyd	(England)	Charlton Athletic	Wolverhampton Wanderers	Free
27 July 2006	Franck Queudrue	(France)	Middlesbrough	Fulham	Undisclosed
28 July 2006	Benni McCarthy	(South Africa)	(Portugal) FC Porto	Blackburn Rovers	Undisclosed
28 July 2006	David Thompson	(England)	Wigan Athletic	Portsmouth	Free
28 July 2006	Ruud van Nistelrooy	(Netherlands)	Manchester United	(Spain) Real Madrid	£10.2m
29 July 2006	Carl Fletcher	(Wales)	West Ham United	Crystal Palace	£400k
29 July 2006	Rudi Skácel	(Czech Republic)	(Scotland) Hearts	Southampton	£1.6m
31 July 2006	Lee Croft	(England)	Manchester City	Norwich City	£600k
31 July 2006	Michael Carrick	(England)	Tottenham Hotspur	Manchester United	£18.6m
1 August 2006	Emmerson Boyce	(England)	Crystal Palace	Wigan Athletic	£1m
1 August 2006	John Paintsil	(Ghana)	(Israel) Hapoel Tel Aviv	West Ham United	£1m
1 August 2006	David Livermore	(England)	Leeds United	Hull City	Undisclosed
2 August 2006	Jamie Clapham	(England)	Birmingham City	Wolverhampton Wanderers	Free
2 August 2006	Danny Higginbotham	(England)	Southampton	Stoke City	£225k
2 August 2006	Kevin Campbell	(England)	West Bromwich Albion	(Wales) Cardiff City	Free
2 August 2006	Willo Flood	(Republic of Ireland)	Manchester City	(Wales) Cardiff City	Undisclosed
3 August 2006	Geoff Horsfield	(England)	Sheffield United	Leeds United	Five-month loan
3 August 2006	Mario Melchiot	(Netherlands)	Birmingham City	(France) Rennes	Free
3 August 2006	Antonio Valencia	(Ecuador)	(Spain) Villarreal	Wigan Athletic	Season-long loan
3 August 2006	Jonatan Johansson	(Finland)	Charlton Athletic	(Sweden) Malmö FF	Free
4 August 2006	Antonio Barragán	(Spain)	Liverpool	(Spain) Deportivo La Coruña	£680k
4 August 2006	Jhon Viáfara	(Colombia)	Portsmouth	Southampton	Undisclosed
4 August 2006	Radhi Jaïdi	(Tunisia)	Bolton Wanderers	Birmingham City	£2m
4 August 2006	Ryan Smith	(England)	Arsenal	Derby County	Undisclosed
4 August 2006	Matthew Oakley	(England)	Southampton	Derby County	Free
4 August 2006	Sebastian Larsson	(Sweden)	Arsenal	Birmingham City	Six-month loan
4 August 2006	Mario Lička	(Czech Republic)	(Czech Republic) FC Slovácko	Southampton	Free
4 August 2006	Gerard Piqué	(Spain)	Manchester United	(Spain) Real Zaragoza	Season-long loan
6 August 2006	Danny Shittu	(Nigeria)	Queens Park Rangers	Watford	£1.6m
7 August 2006	Hernán Crespo	(Argentina)	Chelsea	(Italy) Inter Milan	Two season-long loan
8 August 2006	George McCartney	(Northern Ireland)	Sunderland	West Ham United	£600k
8 August 2006	Clive Clarke	(Republic of Ireland)	West Ham United	Sunderland	Swap
8 August 2006	Zesh Rehman	(England)	Fulham	Queens Park Rangers	Undisclosed
8 August 2006	Sol Campbell	(England)	Arsenal	Portsmouth	Free
8 August 2006	Amady Faye	(Senegal)	Newcastle United	Charlton Athletic	£2m
8 August 2006	Djimi Traoré	(Mali)	Liverpool	Charlton Athletic	£2m
8 August 2006	Simon Charlton	(England)	Norwich City	Oldham Athletic	Free
9 August 2006	Tamás Priskin	(Hungary)	(Hungary) Győri ETO	Watford	£1m
9 August 2006	Dexter Blackstock	(England)	Southampton	Queens Park Rangers	Undisclosed
10 August 2006	Tomasz Kuszczak	(Poland)	West Bromwich Albion	Manchester United	Season-long loan
10 August 2006	Paul McShane	(Republic of Ireland)	Manchester United	West Bromwich Albion	Swap
10 August 2006	Luke Steele	(England)	Manchester United	West Bromwich Albion	Swap
10 August 2006	Ben Foster	(England)	Manchester United	Watford	Season-long loan
10 August 2006	Hatem Trabelsi	(Tunisia)	(Netherlands) Ajax	Manchester City	Free
11 August 2006	David James	(England)	Manchester City	Portsmouth	£1.2m
11 August 2006	Hayden Foxe	(Australia)	Unattached	Leeds United	Free
14 August 2006	Scott Carson	(England)	Liverpool	Charlton Athletic	Season-long loan
15 August 2006	Andreas Isaksson	(Sweden)	(France) Rennes	Manchester City	£2m
16 August 2006	Mo Camara	(Guinea)	(Scotland) Celtic	Derby County	Free
16 August 2006	Robert Green	(England)	Norwich City	West Ham United	£2m
16 August 2006	Gary McSheffrey	(England)	Coventry City	Birmingham City	£4m
16 August 2006	Andy Reid	(Republic of Ireland)	Tottenham Hotspur	Charlton Athletic	£3m
16 August 2006	Phil Bardsley	(England)	Manchester United	(Scotland) Rangers	Season-long loan
17 August 2006	Nwankwo Kanu	(Nigeria)	West Bromwich Albion	Portsmouth	Free
17 August 2006	Jemal Johnson	(United States)	Blackburn Rovers	Wolverhampton Wanderers	Loan
18 August 2006	Dirk Kuyt	(Netherlands)	(Netherlands) Feyenoord	Liverpool	£10m
18 August 2006	Arturo Lupoli	(Italy)	Arsenal	Derby County	Season-long loan
21 August 2006	Khalid Boulahrouz	(Netherlands)	(Germany) Hamburg	Chelsea	Undisclosed
21 August 2006	Anthony Le Tallec	(France)	Liverpool	(France) Sochaux	Season-long loan
22 August 2006	Jean-Alain Boumsong	(France)	Newcastle United	(Italy) Juventus	£3.3m
22 August 2006	Kevin Phillips	(England)	Aston Villa	West Bromwich Albion	£700k
23 August 2006	Mathieu Berson	(France)	Aston Villa	(Spain) Levante	Undisclosed
23 August 2006	Tobias Hysen	(Sweden)	(Sweden) Djurgårdens IF	Sunderland	£1.7m
23 August 2006	Andre Ooijer	(Netherlands)	(Netherlands) PSV Eindhoven	Blackburn Rovers	Undisclosed
24 August 2006	Lee Naylor	(England)	Wolverhampton Wanderers	(Scotland) Celtic	£600k
24 August 2006	Charlie Mulgrew	(Scotland)	(Scotland) Celtic	Wolverhampton Wanderers	Swap
24 August 2006	Obafemi Martins	(Nigeria)	(Italy) Inter Milan	Newcastle United	£10.1m
25 August 2006	Nicolas Anelka	(France)	(Turkey) Fenerbahçe	Bolton Wanderers	£8m
25 August 2006	Sam Parkin	(England)	Ipswich Town	Luton Town	£340k
25 August 2006	Ulises de la Cruz	(Ecuador)	Aston Villa	Reading	Free
25 August 2006	Kevin Kyle	(Scotland)	Sunderland	Coventry City	Undisclosed
29 August 2006	Szilárd Németh	(Slovakia)	Middlesbrough	(Germany) Alemannia Aachen	Free
29 August 2006	Mido	(Egypt)	(Italy) A.S. Roma	Tottenham Hotspur	£4.5m
29 August 2006	Andranik Teymourian	(Iran)	(Iran) F.C. Aboomoslem	Bolton Wanderers	Undisclosed
30 August 2006	Junior Agogo	(Ghana)	Bristol Rovers	Nottingham Forest	Undisclosed
30 August 2006	Stiliyan Petrov	(Bulgaria)	(Scotland) Celtic	Aston Villa	£6.5m
30 August 2006	Neil Mellor	(England)	Liverpool	Preston North End	Undisclosed
30 August 2006	Manuel Fernandes	(Portugal)	(Portugal) Benfica	Portsmouth	Season-long loan
30 August 2006	Jonathan Woodgate	(England)	(Spain) Real Madrid	Middlesbrough	Season-long loan
30 August 2006	Souleymane Diawara	(Senegal)	(France) Sochaux	Charlton Athletic	£3.7m
30 August 2006	Tommy Smith	(England)	Derby County	Watford	£500k
30 August 2006	Giuseppe Rossi	(Italy)	Manchester United	Newcastle United	Four-month loan
31 August 2006	Ricardo Fuller	(Jamaica)	Southampton	Stoke City	£100k
31 August 2006	Andy Cole	(England)	Manchester City	Portsmouth	£500k
31 August 2006	Florent Sinama Pongolle	(France)	Liverpool	(Spain) Recreativo de Huelva	Season-long loan
31 August 2006	Steed Malbranque	(France)	Fulham	Tottenham Hotspur	Undisclosed
31 August 2006	Wayne Routledge	(England)	Tottenham Hotspur	Fulham	Season-long loan
31 August 2006	Jonathan Douglas	(Republic of Ireland)	Blackburn Rovers	Leeds United	Undisclosed
31 August 2006	Paul Ince	(England)	Wolverhampton Wanderers	Swindon Town	Free
31 August 2006	Sylvain Legwinski	(France)	Fulham	Ipswich Town	Undisclosed
31 August 2006	Dwight Yorke	(Trinidad and Tobago)	(Australia) Sydney FC	Sunderland	£200k
31 August 2006	Jason Euell	(Jamaica)	Charlton Athletic	Middlesbrough	£300k
31 August 2006	Nicky Forster	(England)	Ipswich Town	Hull City	£250k
31 August 2006	Omar Pouso	(Uruguay)	(Uruguay) Penarol	Charlton Athletic	Season-long loan
31 August 2006	Javier Mascherano	(Argentina)	(Brazil) Corinthians	West Ham United	Undisclosed
31 August 2006	Carlos Tevez	(Argentina)	(Brazil) Corinthians	West Ham United	Undisclosed
31 August 2006	Niko Kranjčar	(Croatia)	(Croatia) Hajduk Split	Portsmouth	£3.5m
31 August 2006	Kevin Kilbane	(Republic of Ireland)	Everton	Wigan Athletic	£2m
31 August 2006	Colin Kazim-Richards	(England)	Brighton & Hove Albion	Sheffield United	£150k
31 August 2006	Shabani Nonda	(Democratic Republic of the Congo)	(Italy) AS Roma	Blackburn Rovers	Season-long loan
31 August 2006	Jan Kromkamp	(Netherlands)	Liverpool	(Netherlands) PSV Eindhoven	Undisclosed
31 August 2006	Graham Kavanagh	(Republic of Ireland)	Wigan Athletic	Sunderland	£500k
31 August 2006	Roudolphe Douala	(Cameroon)	Sporting Clube de Portugal	Portsmouth	Season-long loan
31 August 2006	Iñigo Idiakez	(Spain)	Derby County	Southampton	£250k
31 August 2006	Leon McKenzie	(England)	Norwich City	Coventry City	£1m
31 August 2006	Stanislav Varga	(Slovakia)	(Scotland) Celtic	Sunderland	Undisclosed
31 August 2006	Ross Wallace	(Scotland)	(Scotland) Celtic	Sunderland	Undisclosed
31 August 2006	Antoine Sibierski	(France)	Manchester City	Newcastle United	Undisclosed
31 August 2006	Pascal Cygan	(France)	Arsenal	Villarreal	£2m
31 August 2006	DaMarcus Beasley	(United States)	(Netherlands) PSV Eindhoven	Manchester City	Season-long loan
31 August 2006	Michael Bridges	(England)	Carlisle United	Hull City	£350k
31 August 2006	David Cotterill	(Wales)	Bristol City	Wigan Athletic	£2m
31 August 2006	José Antonio Reyes	(Spain)	Arsenal	(Spain) Real Madrid	Season-long loan
31 August 2006	Júlio Baptista	(Brazil)	(Spain) Real Madrid	Arsenal	Undisclosed
31 August 2006	Liam Miller	(Republic of Ireland)	Manchester United	Sunderland	Free
31 August 2006	David Connolly	(Republic of Ireland)	Wigan Athletic	Sunderland	Undisclosed
31 August 2006	Eirik Bakke	(Norway)	Leeds United	(Norway) Brann	Free
31 August 2006	Junichi Inamoto	(Japan)	West Bromwich Albion	(Turkey) Galatasaray	Undisclosed
31 August 2006	Shefki Kuqi	(Finland)	Blackburn Rovers	Crystal Palace	£2.5m
31 August 2006	Svetoslav Todorov	(Bulgaria)	Portsmouth	Wigan Athletic	Season-long loan
31 August 2006	Pascal Chimbonda	(France)	Wigan Athletic	Tottenham Hotspur	£6m
31 August 2006	Robert Huth	(Germany)	Chelsea	Middlesbrough	£6m
31 August 2006	Ashley Cole	(England)	Arsenal	Chelsea	£5m
31 August 2006	William Gallas	(France)	Chelsea	Arsenal	Swap
31 August 2006	Denílson	(Brazil)	(Brazil) São Paulo	Arsenal	£3.4m

== See also ==
- List of English football transfers Summer 2007
