= Benoît Cheyrou =

French footballer (born 1981)

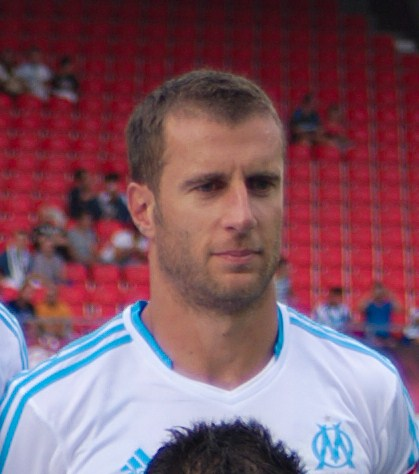
- Cheyrou with Marseille in 2013

Personal information
- Full name: Benoît Benjamin Cheyrou
- Date of birth: 3 May 1981 (age 45)
- Place of birth: Suresnes, Hauts-de-Seine, France
- Height: 1.82 m (6 ft 0 in)
- Position: Midfielder

Team information
- Current team: La Salesienne (assistant manager)

Youth career
- 1987–1997: Racing Paris
- 1997–1999: Lille

Senior career*
Years	Team	Apps	(Gls)
1999–2004	Lille	100	(2)
2004–2007	Auxerre	98	(6)
2007–2014	Marseille	219	(21)
2015–2017	Toronto FC	55	(2)
Total		472	(31)

International career
2002–2003	France U21	14	(1)

Managerial career
- 2018: Toronto FC Academy
- * Club domestic league appearances and goals

Benoît Benjamin Cheyrou (born 3 May 1981) is a French former professional footballer who played as a central midfielder, and often acted as a deep-lying playmaker for the attack. He is the assistant manager of French amateur club La Salesienne de Paris.

He was known for his vision, distribution, and ability to provide assists, and played for France at under-21 level. His older brother is the former French international Bruno Cheyrou, who formerly played for English club Liverpool, and is currently a sports broadcaster. The younger Cheyrou earned his first call up to the national team on 25 February 2010, but unlike his older brother, never made his senior debut for France throughout his playing career.

== Playing career ==
=== Early career ===
Cheyrou was born on Suresnes, Hauts-de-Seine. He began his career at his hometown club Racing Paris, which served as a family tradition among the Cheyrou household as his grandfather, father, and older brother trained there as young players as well. It is also the place where Cheyrou's father met his mother. During his time as a youth at the club, Cheyrou often played against the Paris Saint-Germain youths who were considered more rich and professional than Racing, which led to Cheyrou developing a minor grudge with the Parisian giants. Following Bruno's departure to Lens, the younger Cheyrou stayed behind until securing a move to Division 2 club Lille. That same year, his elder brother joined him at the club.

=== Lille ===
Cheyrou trained in the club's youth system for two years before earning promotion to the senior team for the 1999–2000 season. He made his professional debut on 3 September 1999, appearing as a substitute in a 2–0 victory over Toulouse. Four days later, he made his first professional start playing the entire match in a 1–0 victory over Wasquehal. Cheyrou remained a fixture in the team until the end of the year before suffering injury. He returned to the team for the 2000–01 season with Lille now playing in Division 1. Cheyrou only made eight league appearances, as he was again limited due to injury. The next season saw Cheyrou's appearances increased to 23 league matches with the midfielder also making four appearances in the UEFA Cup. Following the departure of his brother to Liverpool, Cheyrou's importance in the team increased. On 5 October 2002, he scored his first professional goal in a 3–0 victory over Marseille after having appeared as a substitute three minutes prior. After alternating between the bench and first eleven, by mid-season, Cheyrou became a fixture in the starting eleven helping Lille finish in fifth position, thus qualifying for the UEFA Intertoto Cup. In his final season with Lille, Cheyrou appeared in 27 league matches scoring one goal, which came against Guingamp in a 3–1 defeat.

=== Auxerre ===
In 2004, Cheyrou signed with up and coming club Auxerre who were led by former player Guy Roux. In his first season with the club, who were also playing in Europe, he was inserted as a starter alongside fellow midfielders Philippe Violeau and Lionel Mathis. Cheyrou appeared in 29 league matches starting 28 of them. He scored his only league goal of the season in a 2–1 loss to Lyon as Auxerre finished 8th, three points out of the European places. In the UEFA Cup, Cheyrou appeared in all eight matches contested as Auxerre reached the quarter-finals, where they lost 4–2 on aggregate to Russian club CSKA Moscow. Cheyrou scored his first career European goal in the Round of 16 second leg match against Dutch club Ajax. The goal evened the match 2–2 on aggregate and the club advance 3–2 following an 86th-minute goal from Mathis. On 4 June 2005, Cheyrou claimed the first major honour of his career following the club's 2–1 victory over Sedan in the 2005 edition of the Coupe de France final. Cheyrou played the entire match as Auxerre earned the title following a 90th minute game-winning goal from Bonaventure Kalou.

The 2005–06 season saw the arrival of the Dane Thomas Kahlenberg, who Cheyrou formed an impressive partnership with. Cheyrou appeared in a career-high 35 matches for the season and also scored two goals, both in shutout victories over Sochaux and Nantes. Despite suffering early elimination at the hands of Bulgarian club Levski Sofia in the 2005–06 UEFA Cup, the club rebounded in the league finishing in sixth position and, as a result, qualified for the UEFA Intertoto Cup. During the Ligue 1 2006–07 season, Cheyrou was named captain of the team and scored in back-to-back matches in September with Auxerre winning both matches. The club reached the UEFA Cup for the third straight season reaching the group stage where they finished a disappointing fourth place in their group. Auxerre also finished out of Europe in the league standings, which prompted an exodus of players looking to continue playing in UEFA competitions, which included Cheyrou.

=== Marseille ===
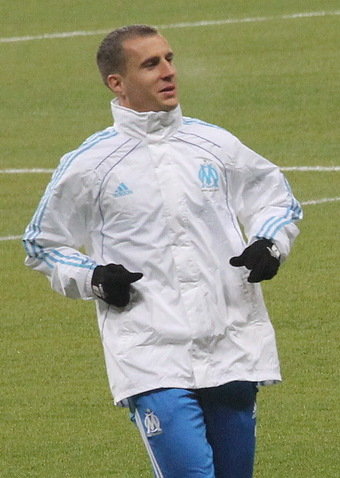
Cheyrou training with Marseille in 2010

Following the 2006–07 season, Marseille sporting director José Anigo sought Cheyrou's services after stating he was impressed with the player's performances during the season. On 21 June 2007, after weeks of discussion, Marseille reached an agreement with Auxerre for the transfer of Cheyrou with the player agreeing to a four-year deal and the southern coast club playing Auxerre €5 million for his services. Cheyrou was presented along with new recruits Gaël Givet and Laurent Bonnart and was assigned the number 7 shirt. Cheyrou made his club debut for the team on 4 August 2007 in a 0–0 draw with Strasbourg. Cheyrou formed an amazing three-way midfield partnership with fellow Frenchman Samir Nasri and the rugged Albanian Lorik Cana. Cheyrou scored two league goals with both coming in draws against Bordeaux and Lens. Marseille finished in 3rd position after falling behind Lyon and Bordeaux during the latter part of the season. Cheyrou was named to the league's Team of the Year for his performances. He also featured in his first-ever UEFA Champions League and impressed playing the entire match in Marseille's upset victory over English club Liverpool at Anfield. Unfortunately, the club finished third in the group, which meant a return to the UEFA Cup for Cheyrou. In the competition, Marseille reached the Round of 16 before shockingly suffering elimination to Russian club Zenit Saint Petersburg despite being up 3–1 heading into the match at Petrovsky Stadium. Cheyrou scored his only goal in the competition in the team's previous round 3–0 first leg win over Spartak Moscow.

The 2008–09 season was arguably Cheyrou's best season of his career. He appeared in 34 league matches scoring three goals and also providing seven assists. His positive play and the team as a whole led to Marseille finishing in 2nd-place position only falling to champions Bordeaux by three points. Cheyrou's score his first two goals on the season in back-to-back weeks against Saint-Étienne and Grenoble. On 26 April 2009, Cheyrou scored the equalizing goal in Marseille's 2–1 come from behind victory over rivals Lille. He followed up his performance in the Lille match by assisting on two goals in Marseille's 4–0 thumping of Rennes on the final match day of the season. Had Bordeaux lost their match on the final day, Marseille would have been crowned champions. For his performances, Cheyrou was named to the Team of the Year for the second straight season. In Europe, Cheyrou scored a vital away goal in Marseille's 1–0 first leg qualifying round victory over Norwegian club Brann. In the group stage, Marseille again finished third and played in the UEFA Cup, where the club reached the quarter-finals. In the Round of 32, Marseille advanced 7–6 on penalties with Cheyrou converting his penalty shot. In the following round, Cheyrou scored Marseille's opening goal in their 2–1 first leg win over Ajax. The team later advanced to the quarterfinals after a late extra time goal from Tyrone Mears in the second leg. The team were later eliminated by Ukrainian club Shakhtar Donetsk.

=== Toronto FC ===
It was confirmed on 29 January 2015 that Benoît had signed a contract with Major League Soccer club Toronto FC.

On 30 November 2016, Benoît scored the game-winning goal in extra-time for Toronto FC, a minute after coming on as a substitution for the injured Sebastian Giovinco in the second leg of the MLS Eastern Conference Final over Montreal Impact, sending Toronto FC to the MLS Cup Final with an eventual 7–5 aggregate win. In the final, held on 10 December at BMO Field, Toronto were defeated 5–4 on penalties by the Seattle Sounders, following a 0–0 draw after extra time, although Cheyrou was able to net his spot kick in the shoot-out.

On 9 December 2017, Cheyrou came on for Marky Delgado as an injury time substitute in the 2017 MLS Cup Final – a rematch of the previous year's final – against Seattle, at BMO Field once again; Toronto won the match 2–0 to capture an unprecedented domestic treble of the MLS Cup, the Supporters' Shield, and the Canadian Championship.

== Coaching career ==
Following a 19-season career, Cheyrou officially announced his retirement from professional football on 21 December 2017, at the age of 36, weeks after winning the MLS Cup with Toronto FC. He stated that he will remain with the Toronto organization, working as a coach with the TFC Academy. On 21 August 2018, Cheyrou left Toronto to return to his native France.

On 7 February 2019, Cheyrou joined French amateur club La Salesienne as the assistant manager.

== Career statistics ==
Appearances and goals by club, season and competition
Club	Season	League			National cup (Note: Includes Coupe de France, Canadian Championship)		League cup (Note: Includes Coupe de la Ligue)		Continental		Other		Total	
Club	Season	Division	Apps	Goals	Apps	Goals	Apps	Goals	Apps	Goals	Apps	Goals	Apps	Goals
Lille	1999–2000	Division 2	11	0	1	0	1	0	–		–		13	0
Lille	2000–01	Division 1	8	0	0	0	0	0	–		–		8	0
Lille	2001–02	Division 1	23	0	1	0	2	0	4	0	–		30	0
Lille	2002–03	Ligue 1	31	1	3	1	3	0	–		–		38	2
Lille	2003–04	Ligue 1	27	1	1	0	0	0	–		–		28	1
Lille	Total		100	2	6	1	6	0	4	0	–		116	3
Auxerre	2004–05	Ligue 1	29	1	4	0	3	0	8 (Note: Appearance(s) in UEFA Cup)	1	–		44	2
Auxerre	2005–06	Ligue 1	35	2	2	0	2	0	1	0	1 (Note: Appearance in Trophée des Champions)	0	41	2
Auxerre	2006–07	Ligue 1	34	3	1	0	2	0	7	1	–		44	4
Auxerre	Total		98	6	7	0	7	0	16	2	1	0	129	8
Marseille	2007–08	Ligue 1	35	2	2	0	2	0	8 (Note: Five appearances in UEFA Champions League, three appearances and one goal in UEFA Cup)	1	–		47	3
Marseille	2008–09	Ligue 1	34	3	1	0	1	0	14 (Note: Eight appearances and one goal in UEFA Champions League, six appearances and one goal in UEFA Cup)	2	–		50	5
Marseille	2009–10	Ligue 1	32	5	2	2	2	0	10 (Note: Six appearances and one goal in UEFA Champions League, four appearances in UEFA Europa League)	1	–		46	8
Marseille	2010–11	Ligue 1	34	3	1	0	4	0	7 (Note: Appearances in UEFA Champions League)	0	0	0	46	3
Marseille	2011–12	Ligue 1	33	4	3	1	3	0	9	0	1	0	49	5
Marseille	2012–13	Ligue 1	25	2	2	0	1	0	7 (Note: Appearances in UEFA Europa League)	0	–		35	2
Marseille	2013–14	Ligue 1	26	2	2	0	1	0	4	0	–		33	2
Marseille	Total		219	21	13	3	14	0	59	4	1	0	306	28
Toronto FC	2015	MLS	28	1	2	1	–		–		1 (Note: Appearance(s) in MLS Cup Playoffs)	0	31	2
Toronto FC	2016	MLS	14	0	4	0	–		–		3	1	21	1
Toronto FC	2017	MLS	13	1	2	1	–		–		1	0	16	2
Toronto FC	Total		55	2	8	2	–		–		5	1	68	5
Career total			472	31	34	6	27	0	79	6	7	1	619	44

== Honours ==
Lille

- Division 2: 1999–2000

Auxerre

- Coupe de France: 2004–05

Marseille

- Ligue 1: 2009–10
- Coupe de la Ligue: 2009–10, 2010–11, 2011–12
- Trophée des Champions: 2010, 2011

Toronto

- MLS Cup: 2017
- Supporters' Shield: 2017
- Eastern Conference (Playoffs): 2016, 2017
- Canadian Championship: 2016, 2017

France U19

- UEFA European Under-19 Championship: 2000

Individual

- Ligue 1 Team of the Year: 2007–08, 2008–09, 2009–10
- George Gross Memorial Trophy: 2016
