= Karim Benkouar =

Moroccan footballer

Personal information
- Date of birth: 25 November 1979 (age 46)
- Place of birth: Fez, Morocco
- Position: Forward

Senior career*
Years	Team	Apps	(Gls)
1999–2000	Nîmes	23	(1)
2000–2001	Panionios	4	(0)
2001	OFI		
2001–2002	Nîmes	2	(0)
2002–2003	Espinho	4	(1)
2003	Nîmes		
2003–2004	ES Vitrolles		
2005–2006	GC Lunel		
2006–2007	Arles-Avignon		
2009–	CO Castelnaudary		

International career
- Morocco
- * Club domestic league appearances and goals

Karim Benkouar (born 25 November 1979) is a Moroccan former footballer. He competed in the men's tournament at the 2000 Summer Olympics.
