= Pierre-Henri Lamy =

French footballer (born 1987)

Personal information
- Full name: Pierre-Henri Lamy
- Date of birth: 17 August 1987 (age 39)
- Place of birth: Château-Gontier, France
- Height: 1.85 m (6 ft 1 in)
- Position: Center back

Senior career*
Years	Team	Apps	(Gls)
2004–2008	Stade Lavallois	66	(2)
2008–2009	Besançon RC	24	(2)
2009–2010	CS Louhans-Cuiseaux	19	(0)
2010–2011	Angers SCO	3	(0)
2011	→ Chamois Niortais (loan)	16	(1)
2011–	Vendée Poiré sur Vie	6	(0)
- * Club domestic league appearances and goals as of 16:31, 20 September 2011 (UTC)

Pierre-Henri Lamy (born August 17, 1987) is a French professional footballer.

He began football at ES Quelaines before joining Ancienne Château-Gontier. Lamy played on the professional level in Ligue 2 for Stade Lavallois and Angers SCO.
