= Ted Kelton Agasson =

French footballer (born 1973)

Ted Agasson
Personal information
- Full name: Kelton Ted Gaëtan Agasson
- Date of birth: 31 August 1973 (age 53)
- Place of birth: Le Lamentin, France
- Height: 1.75 m (5 ft 9 in)
- Position: Striker

Senior career*
Years	Team	Apps	(Gls)
1993–1999	Red Star	168	(35)
1999–2001	Lille	49	(8)
2001–2002	Saint-Étienne	3	(0)
2002–2003	Farense	23	(1)
2003–2004	Aves	6	(0)
2004–2005	Eu FC		
2005	FC Dieppe		
2006–2009	ES Viry-Châtillon		
2009–2010	US Sénart-Moissy		
2010–2012	FC Bry-sur-Marne		
2012–2013	USC Paray-le-Monial		
- * Club domestic league appearances and goals

Kelton Ted Gaëtan Agasson (born 31 August 1973) is a French former professional football player.

== Career ==
Agasson was born in Le Lamentin. He played on the professional level in Ligue 1 for Lille OSC, Ligue 2 for Red Star Saint-Ouen, Lille OSC and AS Saint-Étienne and Liga de Honra for S.C. Farense and C.D. Aves.
