= Pascal Cygan =

French footballer (born 1974)

Personal information
- Full name: Pascal Édouard Cygan
- Date of birth: 29 April 1974 (age 52)
- Place of birth: Lens, France
- Height: 1.92 m (6 ft 4 in)
- Position: Defender

Youth career
- Wasquehal

Senior career*
| Years | Team | Apps | (Gls) |
| 1994–1995 | Wasquehal | | |
| 1995–2002 | Lille | 179 | (10) |
| 2002–2006 | Arsenal | 63 | (3) |
| 2006–2009 | Villarreal | 46 | (2) |
| 2009–2011 | Cartagena | 57 | (0) |
| Total | | 345 | (15) |
- * Club domestic league appearances and goals

Pascal Édouard Cygan (born 29 April 1974) is a French former professional footballer. His favoured position was central defender, but he could also play as a left-back.

After starting out at Lille, he played four years in England with Arsenal and three in Spain's La Liga with Villarreal, in a 17-year career. He won the 2003–04 FA Premier League and two Community Shields with Arsenal.

== Early life ==
Cygan was born in Lens, Pas-de-Calais. His grandparents were of Polish ancestry and his father worked for the Mobile Gendarmerie, with the family living in the corporation's headquarters in Villeneuve-d'Ascq.

== Career ==
=== Lille ===
Cygan started his senior career at lowly ES Wasquehal before going professional with Lille OSC in 1995, making his Division 1 debut that year but also going on to spend three seasons in Division 2. In 1999–2000 he was an instrumental defensive element for the champions and, in the subsequent top-flight campaign, helped them achieve a third-place finish, with qualification for the UEFA Champions League.

In this time, Cygan was also promoted to the captaincy, seen as a role model to help develop the younger players. He won of the Etoile d'Or in his last year in France, totalling 200 games for Lille in all competitions.

=== Arsenal ===
Cygan joined Arsenal in July 2002 for £2 million, making his debut in a 1–1 draw with Chelsea on 1 September after coming on as a late substitute for Nwankwo Kanu. While he featured notably in some of the team's more important fixtures, he was mostly considered only a fringe player; he missed the 2003 FA Cup final through injury, but did pick up a Premier League winners' medal in 2004 after contributing 18 appearances.

Cygan scored three goals for Arsenal in league action, including an unlikely brace in his first game of 2005–06 against Fulham (4–1 home win). Until then he had only netted once, against Everton on 23 March 2003.

Also that season, following injuries to both Ashley Cole and Gaël Clichy, Cygan was drafted in as an emergency left-back, and was even named in the Opta team of the week on 9 January 2006. Overall, his side won 12 of the 20 matches he played in and kept 11 clean sheets in the process. He suffered a hamstring injury in January against Middlesbrough and was unable to play again that season as he was fourth choice behind Sol Campbell, Philippe Senderos and Kolo Touré, with young Johan Djourou also competing for a place.

Cygan played 98 competitive games during his spell at Highbury, including 20 in the Champions League.

=== Villarreal ===
In August 2006, Cygan completed a transfer to Villarreal CF for a £2 million transfer fee, joining former Arsenal teammate and compatriot Robert Pires at the club. On 6 June 2008, having been fairly used in his first two years, mainly due to consecutive serious injuries to Gonzalo Rodríguez, he signed a new one-year deal.

However, following a lack of first-team opportunities in 2008–09, and with Villarreal unwilling to extend his contract for a further campaign, Cygan left in July 2009. His La Liga goals came on 5 November 2006 in a 3–2 home win over Real Betis, and in the 3–0 defeat of Levante UD on 31 October 2007 also at El Madrigal.

=== Later career ===
On 10 August 2009, Cygan joined FC Cartagena, recently promoted to Segunda División, on a one-year deal. Aged 37, he was released by the Murcians and retired from professional football, focusing on becoming a coach.

== Career statistics ==
Appearances and goals by club, season and competition
| Club | Season | League | | | Cup (Note: Includes Coupe de France, Coupe de la Ligue, FA Community Shield, EFL Cup, FA Cup and Copa del Rey) | | Continental (Note: Includes UEFA Champions League and UEFA Cup) | | Total | |
| Club | Season | Division | Apps | Goals | Apps | Goals | Apps | Goals | Apps | Goals |
|---|---|---|---|---|---|---|---|---|---|---|
| Lille | 1995–96 | Division 1 | 27 | 0 | 6 | 0 | – | | 33 | 0 |
| Lille | 1996–97 | Division 1 | 14 | 0 | 1 | 0 | – | | 15 | 0 |
| Lille | 1997–98 | Division 2 | 26 | 3 | 1 | 0 | – | | 27 | 3 |
| Lille | 1998–99 | Division 2 | 21 | 1 | 1 | 0 | – | | 22 | 1 |
| Lille | 1999–2000 | Division 2 | 33 | 2 | 2 | 0 | – | | 35 | 2 |
| Lille | 2000–01 | Division 1 | 29 | 2 | – | | – | | 29 | 2 |
| Lille | 2001–02 | Division 1 | 29 | 2 | – | | 10 | 0 | 39 | 2 |
| Lille | Total | | 179 | 10 | 11 | 0 | 10 | 0 | 200 | 10 |
| Arsenal | 2002–03 | Premier League | 18 | 1 | 2 | 0 | 11 | 0 | 31 | 1 |
| Arsenal | 2003–04 | Premier League | 18 | 0 | 3 | 0 | 3 | 0 | 24 | 0 |
| Arsenal | 2004–05 | Premier League | 15 | 0 | 5 | 0 | 3 | 0 | 23 | 0 |
| Arsenal | 2005–06 | Premier League | 12 | 2 | 5 | 0 | 3 | 0 | 20 | 2 |
| Arsenal | Total | | 63 | 3 | 15 | 0 | 20 | 0 | 98 | 3 |
| Villarreal | 2006–07 | La Liga | 21 | 1 | – | | – | | 21 | 1 |
| Villarreal | 2007–08 | La Liga | 21 | 1 | 6 | 0 | 5 | 0 | 32 | 1 |
| Villarreal | 2008–09 | La Liga | 4 | 0 | 2 | 0 | – | | 6 | 0 |
| Villarreal | Total | | 46 | 2 | 8 | 0 | 5 | 0 | 59 | 2 |
| Cartagena | 2009–10 | Segunda División | 26 | 0 | – | | – | | 26 | 0 |
| Cartagena | 2010–11 | Segunda División | 31 | 0 | – | | – | | 31 | 0 |
| Cartagena | Total | | 57 | 0 | 0 | 0 | 0 | 0 | 57 | 0 |
| Career total | | | 345 | 15 | 34 | 0 | 35 | 0 | 414 | 15 |

== Honours ==
Lille

- Division 2: 1999–2000

Arsenal

- Premier League: 2003–04
- FA Community Shield: 2002, 2004

Individual

- Etoile d'Or: 2001–02
