= Dagui Bakari =

Ivorian footballer (born 1974)

Personal information
- Full name: Dagui Orphie Bakari
- Date of birth: 6 September 1974 (age 52)
- Place of birth: Paris, France
- Height: 1.95 m (6 ft 5 in)
- Position: Striker

Senior career*
Years	Team	Apps	(Gls)
1994–1995	Olympique Noisy-le-Sec		
1995–1996	Amiens	3	(0)
1996–1999	Le Mans	98	(29)
1999–2002	Lille	84	(21)
2002–2005	Lens	57	(6)
2005	Nancy	1	(0)

International career
2003–2004	Ivory Coast	7	(4)
- * Club domestic league appearances and goals

Dagui Orphie Bakari (born 6 September 1974) is an Ivorian former professional footballer who played as a striker.

In 2004 he had a trial at Premier League club Tottenham Hotspur, however a permanent deal did not materialise.

== Career statistics ==
Appearances and goals by club, season and competition
Club	Season	League			Cup (Note: Includes Coupe de France and Coupe de la Ligue.)		Continental (Note: Includes UEFA Cup, UEFA Champions League and UEFA Intertoto-Cup.)		Total	
Club	Season	Division	Apps	Goals	Apps	Goals	Apps	Goals	Apps	Goals
Amiens	1995–96	Division 2	3	0	0	0	–		3	0
Le Mans	1996–97	Division 2	38	11	3	2	–		41	13
Le Mans	1997–98	Division 2	30	9	3	0	–		33	9
Le Mans	1998–99	Division 2	30	9	5	5	–		35	14
Le Mans	Total		98	29	11	7	0	0	109	36
Lille	1999–00	Division 2	28	7	2	1	–		30	8
Lille	2000–01	Division 1	31	5	2	0	–		33	5
Lille	2001–02	Division 1	25	9	1	0	10	2	36	11
Lille	Total		84	21	5	1	10	2	99	24
Lens	2002–03	Ligue 1	22	2	3	2	6	1	31	5
Lens	2003–04	Ligue 1	27	4	4	0	6	3	37	7
Lens	2004–05	Ligue 1	8	0	3	3	3	0	14	3
Lens	Total		57	6	10	5	15	4	82	15
Nancy	2005–06	Ligue 1	1	0	0	0	–		1	0
Career total			245	56	26	13	25	6	291	75
