= Christophe Landrin =

French footballer (born 1977)

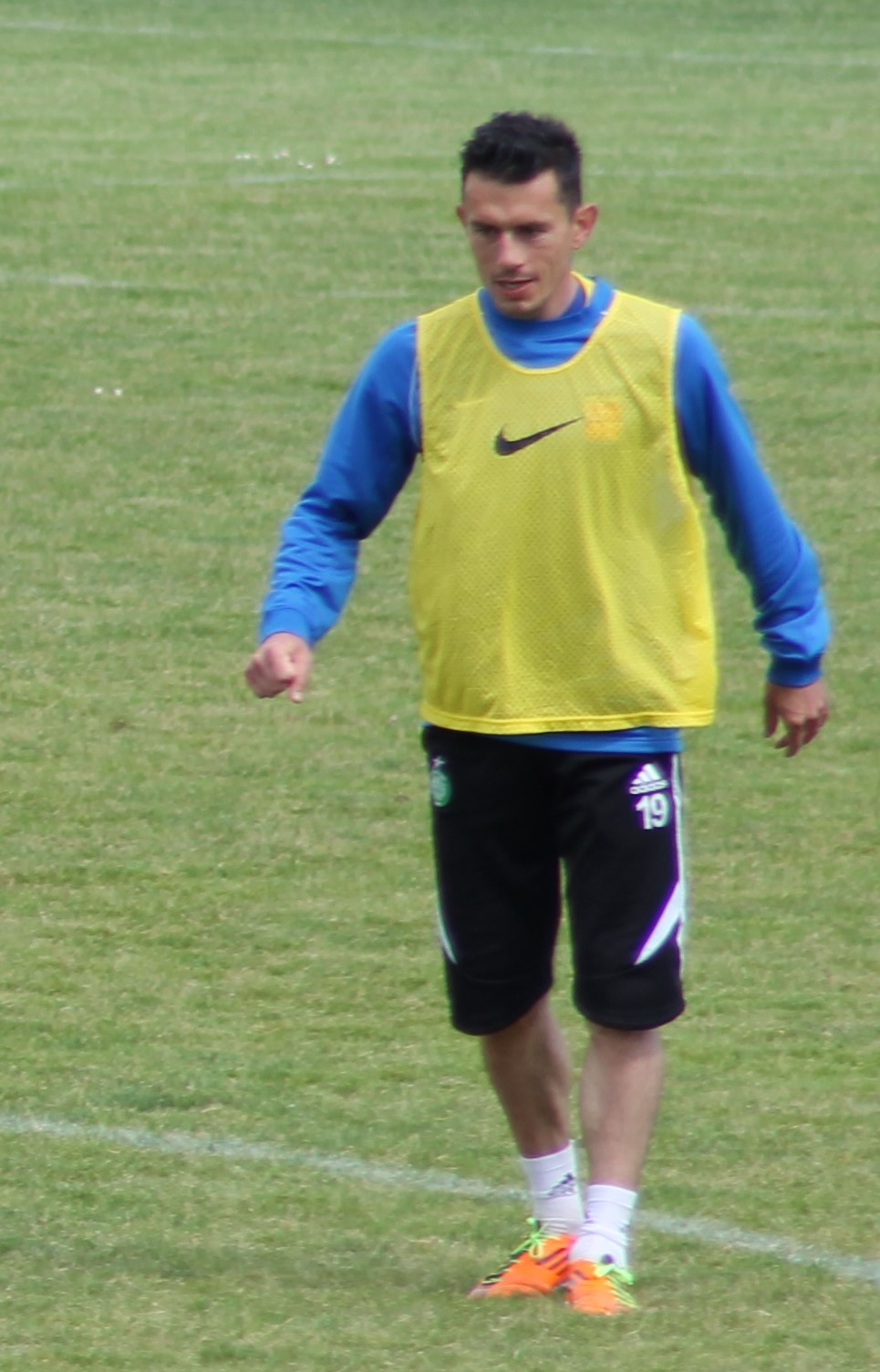
- Landrin in 2014

Personal information
- Date of birth: 30 June 1977 (age 49)
- Place of birth: Roubaix, France
- Height: 1.78 m (5 ft 10 in)
- Position: Midfielder

Youth career
- Lille

Senior career*
Years	Team	Apps	(Gls)
1996–2005	Lille	177	(16)
2005–2006	Paris Saint-Germain	26	(2)
2006–2010	Saint-Étienne	126	(6)
2011–2012	Arles-Avignon	13	(0)
Total		342	(24)

International career
1996–1997	France U21	1	(0)
- * Club domestic league appearances and goals

Christophe Landrin (born 30 June 1977) is a French former professional footballer who played as a midfielder. His brother, Sebastien, is one of the main players of the French national rink hockey team.

== Honours ==
Lille

- UEFA Intertoto Cup: 2004

Paris Saint-Germain

- Coupe de France: 2005–06
