= Stade Grimonprez-Jooris =

Multi-purpose stadium in Lille, France

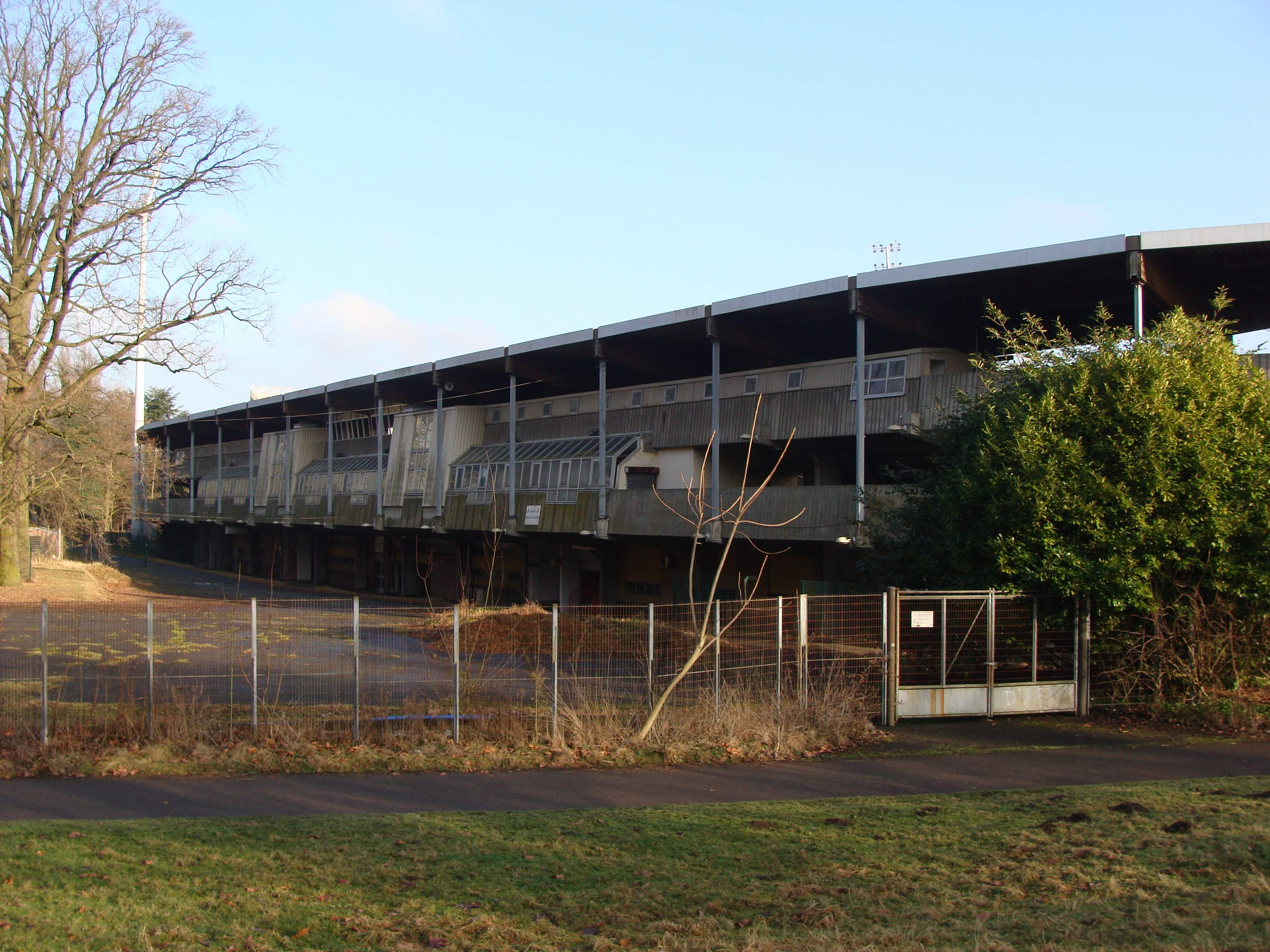
- Interactive map of Stade Grimonprez-Jooris
- Location: Lille, France
- Coordinates: 50°38′40.39″N 3°2′49.10″E
- Capacity: 21,128
- Surface: Grass

Construction
- Built: 1974
- Opened: 28 October 1975
- Renovated: 2000
- Closed: 15 May 2004
- Demolished: 2010
- Architect: Pierre-François Delannoyla

Tenant
- Lille OSC (1975–2004)

Stade Grimonprez-Jooris was a multi-purpose stadium in Lille, France, built in 1974. It was used mainly for football matches as it was home to the Lille OSC football club from 1975 until 2004, when the stadium was closed.

The club originally planned to have Grimonprez-Jooris redeveloped into a 33,000-seat stadium, but this proposal was rejected, and the Grand Stade Lille Métropole was constructed instead.

The stadium was officially opened on 28 October 1975, when Lille played a friendly against Dutch side Feyenoord (which ended in a 1–1 draw) and the last match at the stadium was played on 15 May 2004, Lille's last home game in the 2003–04 Ligue 1 season against SC Bastia. Lille won the game 2–0 with Matt Moussilou scoring the last goal in the history of Grimonprez-Jooris.

== History ==
The club's original stadium Stade Henri-Jooris had been demolished in 1975 in order to allow the enlargement of the Canal de la Deûle, a navigable waterway which passes through the city of Lille, and the design for a new stadium was made by Lille architect Pierre-François Delannoyla. Although the club wanted the new stadium to retain the old name Stade Henri Jooris (named after Henri Jooris, former Lille OSC manager), the mayor proposed it to be called Stade Félix Grimonprez after Félix Grimonprez, a former field hockey player who competed in the 1928 Summer Olympics and the 1936 Summer Olympics. This resulted in a compromise solution in which the stadium was hence named Stade Grimonprez-Jooris.

The stadium's original capacity was 25,000 at the time it was opened, but this was reduced to around 17,000 by 2000 due to the evolution of safety standards. In 2000 the stadium was renovated and the capacity was increased to 21,128 (14,534 seated). However, the stadium still failed to meet FIFA licensing regulations and Lille had to play their 2001–02 UEFA Champions League matches at the Stade Félix-Bollaert.

== Redevelopment plans and demolition ==
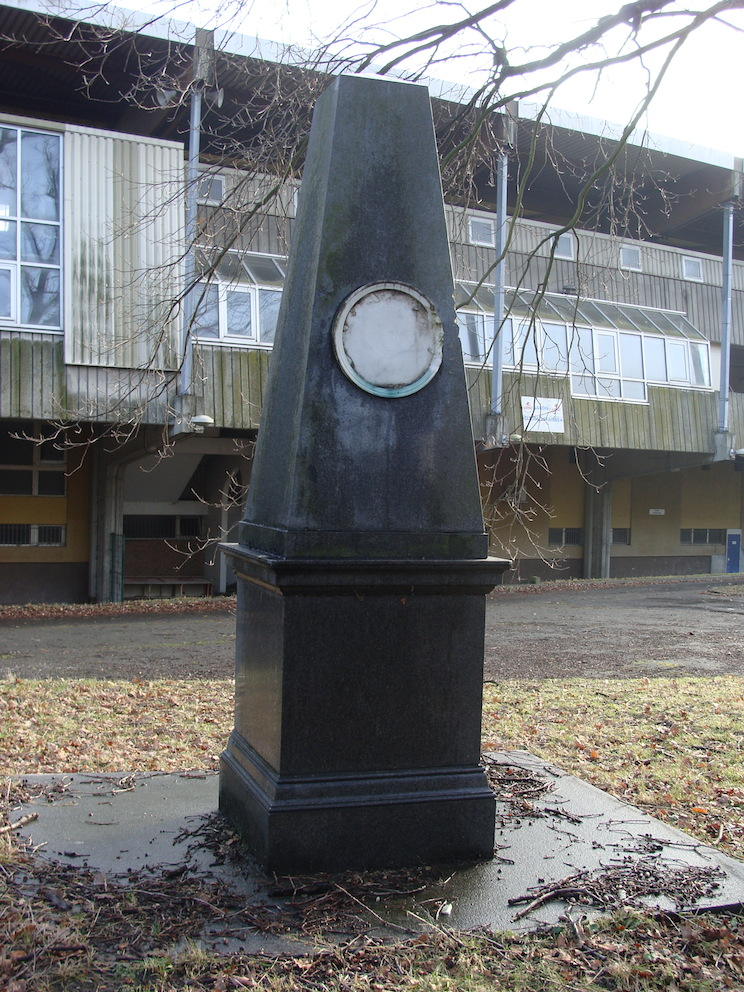
Monument Henri Jooris on the site of the demolished stadium

Plans to build a new stadium compliant with UEFA's standards were made in 2002, when the club was privatised. City authorities tried to persuade the club's new owners to redevelop the existing stadium, but they refused and instead opted for a plan to build a new 60,000-seat stadium outside the city, financed as a public-private partnership. However, their search for investors willing to finance the ambitious project was met with little success.

In June 2003 the club's board agreed to a new proposal put forward by the city mayor to build a new 33,000-seat stadium on the site of the Grimonprez-Jooris. Preliminary works which included dismantling of training grounds were undertaken, and the delivery was scheduled for 31 December 2004 but was postponed. In the meantime the funding of the project moved from the City Council to the Urban Community of Lille Métropole and became 100 percent public. Construction work was then planned to begin in early 2005, but the project faced opposition from preservationists who successfully prevented the project to obtain necessary permits as the site of the stadium was close to the 17th-century Citadel of Lille. The delays forced Lille OSC to play their league matches at Stadium Nord Lille Métropole and their 2005–06 UEFA Champions League games at Stade de France in the Paris suburb of Saint-Denis.

After two years of court battles, local courts had declared issued building permits void in July and December 2005, which meant that Grimonprez-Jooris II would never come into existence. Once the dismantling of training grounds was completed, the club moved their facilities to Camphin-en-Pévèle. The failed project cost the city of Lille 6 million euros, including 3 million paid to the architecture bureau, 2 million in damages to businesses which invested in the project and 1 million for court fees. The future of the stadium was unclear until January 2007 when the Urban Community of Lille Métropole decided to fund the demolition of the stadium. The demolition works finally began in March 2010.
