= Johnny Ecker =

French footballer (born 1973)

Personal information
- Date of birth: 16 January 1973 (age 53)
- Place of birth: Rouen, France
- Height: 1.87 m (6 ft 2 in)
- Position: Defender

Senior career*
Years	Team	Apps	(Gls)
1992–1993	Beaucaire		
1993–1999	Nîmes	146	(9)
1999–2002	Lille	81	(3)
2002–2005	Marseille	57	(0)
2005–2006	Guingamp	17	(0)
2006–2007	Nîmes	25	(2)
2008–2009	Bagnols-sur-Cèze		
2009–2011	Beaucaire		
- * Club domestic league appearances and goals

Johnny Ecker (born 16 January 1973) is a French former professional footballer who played as a defender.

At club level, he played for Lille, Marseille, Guingamp, Bagnols-sur-Cèze, and Beaucaire. He retired in 2011.
