= Emmanuel Clément-Demange =

French footballer (born 1970)

Personal information
- Full name: Emmanuel Clément-Demange
- Date of birth: 4 February 1970
- Place of birth: Saint-Dié-des-Vosges, France
- Height: 1.80 m (5 ft 11 in)
- Position: Forward

Senior career*
Years	Team	Apps	(Gls)
1986–1988	Valenciennes B		
1988–1993	Fécamp		
1993–2000	Wasquehal	71+	(25+)
2000–2001	Valenciennes	22	(4)
2001–2002	Abbeville	9	(3)
- * Club domestic league appearances and goals

Emmanuel Clément-Demange (born 4 February 1970) is a French former professional footballer who played as a forward from 1993 to 2002.

== See also ==
- Football in France
