= Bruno Cheyrou =

French footballer (born 1978)

Personal information
- Full name: Bruno Olivier Cheyrou
- Date of birth: 10 May 1978 (age 48)
- Place of birth: Suresnes, Hauts-de-Seine, France
- Height: 1.85 m (6 ft 1 in)
- Position: Midfielder

Senior career*
Years	Team	Apps	(Gls)
1998–2002	Lille	111	(31)
2002–2006	Liverpool	31	(2)
2004–2005	→ Marseille (loan)	23	(2)
2005–2006	→ Bordeaux (loan)	28	(1)
2006–2009	Rennes	107	(14)
2010	Anorthosis	12	(2)
2010–2012	Nantes	41	(1)
Total		353	(53)

International career
2002–2004	France	3	(0)
- * Club domestic league appearances and goals

Bruno Olivier Cheyrou (born 10 May 1978) is a French former professional footballer who played as a midfielder.

== Club career ==
Cheyrou was born in Suresnes, Hauts-de-Seine. After success with Lille, where he scored against Manchester United in the UEFA Champions League, Cheyrou attracted interest from a number of clubs around Europe, most notably Liverpool. Gérard Houllier had the player scouted for several months by scout David Murray before deciding to sign him in the summer of 2002 for £4.5 million (€6.5m).

On signing him, Houllier dubbed Cheyrou the "new Zidane". Over time this tag proved to be a burden as he failed to live up to expectations. His first Liverpool goal came against Spartak Moscow in the Champions League, however, this would be his only goal of the 2002–03 season. Despite being left out of Liverpool's squad for the victorious 2003 Football League Cup Final he contributed in the earlier rounds, and was on the pitch as Liverpool secured their place in the final by beating Sheffield United.

A spell of four goals in five games over the Christmas period of the 2003–04 season at one time suggested his Liverpool career may make a turn for the better. Arguably, the highlight of Cheyrou's Liverpool career was the winning goal he scored in the 33rd minute at Chelsea during the 2003–04 season. He only scored once more in the league for Liverpool, in the 1–1 draw at Wolves in January 2004. Three days later, Cheyrou had another memorable game for Liverpool in the FA Cup where he scored twice to help Liverpool beat Newcastle 2–1.

At the beginning of the 2004–05 season, new manager Rafael Benítez deemed Cheyrou surplus to requirements and immediately loaned him to Marseille in a season-long deal. He played 20 times for the club, scoring one goal. In the 2005–06 season, he was once again sent on a season-long loan, this time to Bordeaux, with a view to a permanent move; however, this failed to materialise. Ahead of the following season, he made a permanent move to Rennes and played there for three and a half seasons, scoring some goals. In January 2010, Anorthosis Famagusta signed the midfielder from Rennes. After six months with Anorthosis, the 32-year-old midfielder returned to France and signed a two-year contract for Nantes.

== International career ==
Cheyrou has been capped three times by the France national team between 2002 and 2004, making his senior international debut on 21 August 2002 in a 1–1 draw against Tunisia.

== Personal life ==
Bruno has a younger brother, Benoît Cheyrou, who played for Toronto FC. Cheyrou and his wife Constance have a son born in 2007 in France.

== Career statistics ==
Appearances and goals by club, season and competition
Club	Season	League			National Cup		League Cup		Europe		Other		Total	
Club	Season	Division	Apps	Goals	Apps	Goals	Apps	Goals	Apps	Goals	Apps	Goals	Apps	Goals
Lille	1998–99	Division 2	20	6	2	0			–		–		22	6
Lille	1999–2000	Division 2	21	5	1	0	1	0	–		–		23	5
Lille	2000–01	Division 1	28	6	0	0	0	0	–		–		28	6
Lille	2001–02	Division 1	27	11	0	0	0	0	11 (Note: Appearances in UEFA Champions League)	4	–		38	15
Lille	Total		86	28	3	0	1	0	11	4	–		101	32
Liverpool	2002–03	Premier League	19	0	2	0	2	0	5 (Note: Appearances and goal in UEFA Champions League, appearances in UEFA Cup)	1	1 (Note: Appearance in FA Community Shield)	0	29	1
Liverpool	2003–04	Premier League	12	2	4	2	0	0	3 (Note: Appearances in UEFA Cup)	0	–		19	4
Liverpool	Total		31	2	6	2	2	0	8	1	1	0	48	5
Marseille (loan)	2004–05	Ligue 1	19	1	1	0	0	0	–		–		20	1
Bordeaux (loan)	2005–06	Ligue 1	26	1	1	0	3	0	–		–		30	1
Rennes	2006–07	Ligue 1	17	3	1	0	2	0	–		–		20	3
Rennes	2007–08	Ligue 1	27	0	1	0	2	0	6	2	–		36	2
Rennes	2008–09	Ligue 1	23	4	4	0	1	0	2 (Note: Appearances in UEFA Europa League)	0	–		30	4
Rennes	2009–10	Ligue 1	8	0	0	0	1	0	–		–		9	0
Rennes	Total		75	7	6	0	6	0	8	2	–		95	9
Career total			239	39	17	2	12	0	27	7	1	0	296	48

== Honours ==
Lille

- Division 2: 1999–2000
