= 1999–2000 French Division 2 =

61st season of the second-tier football league in France

Division 2
- Season: 1999–2000

The Division 2 season 1999/2000, organised by the LNF was won by Lille OSC and saw the promotions of Lille OSC, EA Guingamp and Toulouse FC, whereas Amiens SC, ASOA Valence and CS Louhans-Cuiseaux were relegated to National.

== 20 participating teams ==
- Ajaccio
- Amiens
- Caen
- Cannes
- Châteauroux
- Créteil
- Gueugnon
- Guingamp
- Laval
- Le Mans
- Lille
- Lorient
- Louhans-Cuiseaux
- Nice
- Nîmes
- Niort
- Sochaux
- Toulouse
- Valence
- Wasquehal

== League table ==
Pos	Team	Pld	W	D	L	GF	GA	GD	Pts	Promotion or Relegation
1	Lille (C, P)	38	25	8	5	58	25	+33	83	Promotion to French Division 1
2	Guingamp (P)	38	18	13	7	62	41	+21	67	Promotion to French Division 1
3	Toulouse (P)	38	18	9	11	52	31	+21	63	Promotion to French Division 1
4	Sochaux	38	18	8	12	53	41	+12	62	
5	Gueugnon	38	13	17	8	47	34	+13	56	Qualification to UEFA Cup First round (Note: Coupe de la Ligue winners Gueugnon qualify for the 2000–01 UEFA Cup First round of 2000–01 UEFA Cup.)
6	Caen	38	12	17	9	50	37	+13	53	
7	Ajaccio	38	15	8	15	37	41	−4	53	
8	Châteauroux	38	13	13	12	44	44	0	52	
9	Le Mans	38	12	16	10	44	44	0	52	
10	Laval	38	12	15	11	41	40	+1	51	
11	Nice	38	10	20	8	34	33	+1	50	
12	Cannes	38	12	12	14	33	38	−5	48	
13	Lorient	38	12	11	15	32	39	−7	47	
14	Nîmes	38	11	12	15	39	44	−5	45	
15	Niort	38	10	15	13	42	49	−7	45	
16	Wasquehal	38	9	17	12	33	39	−6	44	
17	Créteil	38	11	11	16	36	52	−16	44	
18	Amiens (R)	38	7	16	15	30	43	−13	37	Relegation to Championnat National [fr]
19	Valence (R)	38	6	15	17	37	54	−17	33	Relegation to Championnat National [fr]
20	Louhans-Cuiseaux (R)	38	5	9	24	32	67	−35	24	Relegation to Championnat National [fr]

Source: Ligue 2
(C) Champions; (P) Promoted; (R) Relegated

== Recap ==
- Promoted to L1: Lille OSC, EA Guingamp, Toulouse FC
- Relegated to L2: AS Nancy, Le Havre AC, Montpellier HSC
- Promoted to L2: AS Beauvais, FC Martigues, Angers SCO
- Relegated to National: Amiens SC, ASOA Valence, CS Louhans-Cuiseaux

== Results ==
Home \ Away	ACA	AMI	CAE	CAN	CHA	CRE	GUE	GUI	MFC	LAV	LIL	LOR	LOU	NIC	NMS	NRT	SOC	TFC	VLN	WAS
Ajaccio		1–3	1–0	1–0	1–0	2–0	0–0	1–0	0–1	1–0	0–1	0–1	3–0	1–0	2–1	2–2	0–2	0–1	2–0	2–1
Amiens	0–1		0–4	0–2	1–0	0–0	1–1	0–0	2–0	1–1	0–1	0–0	1–1	4–1	0–0	0–0	0–2	1–1	0–0	4–1
Caen	1–1	4–1		1–1	4–1	1–1	2–2	1–2	1–1	1–1	1–0	1–2	6–1	1–1	2–1	2–1	1–2	1–1	1–0	0–0
Cannes	2–0	1–0	1–0		0–1	1–0	1–1	0–2	2–1	0–0	2–2	1–0	2–1	0–1	2–0	2–1	1–3	0–2	0–0	0–0
Châteauroux	1–0	0–0	0–0	3–0		0–0	0–1	2–3	3–2	3–1	2–3	1–0	3–2	3–0	0–0	1–0	1–1	0–3	3–3	1–1
Créteil	1–1	2–0	2–1	1–1	0–1		1–4	1–3	1–1	2–0	1–0	0–1	2–1	0–0	3–2	1–1	0–0	3–1	2–1	1–1
Gueugnon	2–2	2–0	4–0	1–1	1–1	1–0		1–1	2–1	1–1	0–1	3–0	0–1	0–4	3–1	2–2	1–2	0–0	0–0	1–1
Guingamp	1–1	2–3	3–1	2–1	3–2	0–2	0–2		3–1	2–2	1–1	3–0	2–2	5–0	1–0	1–1	1–2	2–0	1–0	3–1
Le Mans	1–1	1–1	0–0	2–1	2–1	2–0	1–1	1–1		0–0	1–1	2–1	2–1	0–0	1–0	2–2	2–1	1–1	4–0	0–0
Laval	1–0	1–0	1–1	2–1	4–0	1–0	2–1	0–2	2–1		0–1	1–1	1–0	1–1	1–1	3–1	1–2	0–3	3–2	0–1
Lille	4–2	1–0	3–2	2–0	1–0	5–0	1–1	2–0	2–0	1–0		1–0	1–0	1–0	1–0	1–0	0–1	2–0	4–1	1–0
Lorient	1–0	2–0	1–2	1–1	1–1	3–0	0–3	0–2	0–0	0–0	0–0		5–1	0–1	0–1	2–0	0–0	1–1	3–1	0–0
Louhans-Cuiseaux	1–1	0–0	0–4	0–1	1–3	1–2	1–1	0–0	0–1	2–0	1–2	0–1		0–0	1–0	2–3	2–2	1–2	3–2	2–1
Nice	0–1	0–0	0–0	2–0	0–0	2–0	1–1	0–0	1–1	2–2	0–0	3–1	2–0		1–1	0–0	2–1	2–0	0–0	1–1
Nîmes	1–0	2–2	0–0	1–1	1–1	2–1	0–1	2–0	1–2	0–0	3–3	1–2	2–1	1–1		1–4	2–1	3–0	3–2	1–2
Niort	1–0	1–2	0–0	1–1	1–0	1–3	1–0	3–3	4–3	3–2	0–3	1–0	1–0	1–2	0–1		2–1	1–1	1–1	0–0
Sochaux	1–2	3–2	1–2	1–0	1–2	5–1	0–1	1–1	3–1	0–2	2–0	1–1	1–1	2–1	2–0	1–0		0–2	2–0	2–1
Toulouse	4–1	2–0	0–1	2–1	0–1	1–1	2–0	1–2	3–0	0–2	0–2	5–0	2–0	0–0	0–1	1–1	3–0		2–0	2–0
Valence	1–2	2–1	0–0	0–0	2–2	3–1	0–1	1–1	0–0	1–1	2–2	0–1	3–0	2–0	0–2	0–0	2–1	0–2		1–0
Wasquehal	3–1	0–0	0–0	0–2	0–0	1–0	1–0	2–3	1–2	1–1	2–1	1–0	2–1	2–2	0–0	2–0	0–0	0–1	3–3	

Source: Ligue 2
Legend: Blue = home team win; Yellow = draw; Red = away team win.

== Top goalscorers ==
Rank	Player	Club	Goals
1	(Senegal) Amara Traoré	Gueugnon	17
2	(Federal Republic of Yugoslavia) Danijel Ljuboja	Sochaux	16
2	(France) Mickaël Pagis	Nîmes	16
4	(France) David Faderne	Ajaccio	15
5	(France) Jean-Claude Darcheville	Lorient	14
6	(France) Jonathan Jäger	Louhans-Cuiseaux	13
7	(France) Fabrice Fiorèse	Guingamp	12
7	(France) Stéphane Samson	Le Mans	12
7	(France) Djezon Boutoille	Lille	12
7	(France) Emmanuel Clément-Demange	Wasquehal	12
7	(France) Stéphane Crucet	Laval	12

== Attendances ==
#	Club	Average
1	Toulouse	12,619
2	LOSC	12,190
3	Caen	11,665
4	Guingamp	8,976
5	Amiens	7,605
6	Sochaux	6,316
7	Lorient	5,915
8	La Berrichonne	5,543
9	Nice	4,849
10	Le Mans	4,771
11	Nîmes	4,405
12	Chamois niortais	3,887
13	Stade lavallois	3,828
14	Gueugnon	3,595
15	Valence	3,196
16	Cannes	2,523
17	Wasquehal	2,259
18	Créteil	2,154
19	Ajaccio	2,135
20	Louhans-Cuiseaux	1,847
