= Djézon Boutoille =

French footballer and manager (born 1975)

Personal information
- Full name: Djézon Boutoille
- Date of birth: November 9, 1975 (age 50)
- Place of birth: Calais, France
- Height: 1.70 m (5 ft 7 in)
- Position: Striker

Team information
- Current team: Gravelines (Head coach)

Senior career*
Years	Team	Apps	(Gls)
1993–2004	Lille	241	(38)
2004–2005	Amiens	30	(2)
2005–2009	Calais	81	(19)

Managerial career
- 2009–2017: Calais
- 2018–: Gravelines
- * Club domestic league appearances and goals

Djezon Boutoille (born November 9, 1975) is a French football former player and current manager who manages lower league side Union Sportive Gravelines Football.

== Career ==
Boutoille having previously played for Lille OSC and Amiens SC.

== Coaching career ==
On 25 March 2009, Boutoille was named Calais' manager, replacing Sylvain Jore. He managed Calais until the end of the 2016 17 season.

== Achievements ==
- Ligue 2 champion in 2000 with Lille.
