= 2018 RoPS season =

RoPS
2018 season
- Chairman: Risto Niva
- Manager: Toni Koskela
- Stadium: Keskuskenttä
- Veikkausliiga: 2nd
- Finnish Cup: Sixth Round
- Top goalscorer: League: Lassi Lappalainen (8); All: Lassi Lappalainen (11)
Home colours	Away colours

The 2018 season is RoPS's 6th Veikkausliiga season since their promotion back to the top flight in 2012.

== Squad ==
As of 9 August 2018

Note: Flags indicate national team as defined under FIFA eligibility rules; some limited exceptions apply. Players may hold more than one non-FIFA nationality.

No.	Pos.	Nation	Player
2	DF	FIN	Eerik Kantola
3	DF	NGA	Taye Taiwo
4	MF	FIN	Antti Okkonen (Captain)
5	DF	HAI	Jems Geffrard
6	DF	FIN	Juho Hyvärinen
7	MF	GEO	Giorgi Gorozia
8	MF	FIN	Erfan Zeneli
9	FW	FIN	Vahid Hambo
10	MF	FIN	Lucas Lingman
11	MF	BRA	Agnaldo (on loan from Molde)
12	GK	FIN	Juhani Kangas
13	DF	FIN	Lassi Järvenpää
14	MF	FIN	Eetu Muinonen

No.	Pos.	Nation	Player
15	DF	FIN	Leo Väisänen
17	FW	FIN	Sampo Ala
18	MF	FIN	Veka Pyyny
19	FW	FIN	Jarkko Luiro
20	FW	FIN	Simo Roiha
22	MF	FIN	Rasmus Degerman
24	FW	FIN	Lassi Lappalainen (on loan from HJK)
25	GK	ESP	Antonio Reguero
26	DF	JPN	Fugo Segawa
30	GK	FIN	Jimi Vaarala
47	DF	FIN	Juuso Hämäläinen
—	GK	FIN	Jarkko Ojaniemi

== Transfers ==
=== Winter ===
In: Note: Flags indicate national team as defined under FIFA eligibility rules; some limited exceptions apply. Players may hold more than one non-FIFA nationality.

No.	Pos.	Nation	Player
5	DF	HAI	Jems Geffrard (from (Finland) Ekenäs IF)
8	MF	POR	Wato Kuaté (from (Israel) Hapoel Petah Tikva)
9	FW	MKD	Filip Ivanovski ( (Serbia) Javor Ivanjica)
11	MF	BRA	Agnaldo (loan from (Norway) Molde)
26	DF	JPN	Fugo Segawa (from (Finland) PEPO)

Out: Note: Flags indicate national team as defined under FIFA eligibility rules; some limited exceptions apply. Players may hold more than one non-FIFA nationality.

No.	Pos.	Nation	Player
1	GK	USA	Tyler Back
2	DF	NGA	Sani Kaita
5	DF	SRB	Ivan Tatomirović (to (Finland) IFK Mariehamn)
7	FW	CHI	Mota (to (Chile) Deportes Melipilla)
8	DF	NED	Nathaniël Will (to (Netherlands) SV Spakenburg)
10	FW	AZE	Cem Felek (to (Germany) TSV Steinbach)
11	FW	GHA	Glenn Gabriel

=== Summer ===
In: Note: Flags indicate national team as defined under FIFA eligibility rules; some limited exceptions apply. Players may hold more than one non-FIFA nationality.

No.	Pos.	Nation	Player
7	MF	GEO	Giorgi Gorozia (from (Malta) Hibernians)
8	MF	FIN	Erfan Zeneli
9	FW	FIN	Vahid Hambo (from (Finland) SJK)
87	FW	FIN	Aleksandr Kokko (from (Hong Kong) Eastern)

Out: Note: Flags indicate national team as defined under FIFA eligibility rules; some limited exceptions apply. Players may hold more than one non-FIFA nationality.

No.	Pos.	Nation	Player
7	MF	BRA	Matheus Caliman
8	MF	POR	Wato Kuaté
9	FW	MKD	Filip Ivanovski
21	MF	FIN	Aapo Heikkilä (to (Finland) AC Oulu)

== Competitions ==
=== Veikkausliiga ===
==== League table ====
Pos	Team	Pld	W	D	L	GF	GA	GD	Pts	Qualification or relegation
1	HJK (C)	33	24	6	3	61	19	+42	78	Qualification for the Champions League first qualifying round (Note: HJK qualified for the Champions League first qualifying round)
2	RoPS	33	18	8	7	42	25	+17	62	Qualification for the Europa League first qualifying round
3	KuPS	33	17	7	9	56	37	+19	58	Qualification for the Europa League first qualifying round
4	Honka	33	15	13	5	51	33	+18	58	
5	Ilves	33	14	7	12	45	41	+4	49	

Source: Veikkausliiga (in Finnish), Soccerway
Rules for classification: 1) Points; 2) Goal difference; 3) Goals scored; 4) Head-to-head points; 5) Head-to-head goal difference; 6) Head-to-head away goals scored; 7) Play-off
(Note: Play-off is only played if need to decide champion, teams for relegation or UEFA competition and will be played on a neutral ground).
(C) Champions

==== Results summary ====
Overall								Home						Away					
Pld	W	D	L	GF	GA	GD	Pts	W	D	L	GF	GA	GD	W	D	L	GF	GA	GD
33	18	8	7	42	25	+17	62	10	2	4	20	8	+12	8	6	3	22	17	+5

Last updated: 27 October 2018.
Source: See results

==== Results by matchday ====
Round	1	2	3	4	5	6	7	8	9	10	11	12	13	14	15	16	17	18	19	20	21	22	23	24	25	26	27	28	29	30	31	32	33
Ground	H	A	A	H	H	A	H	A	H	A	A	H	H	A	A	H	A	H	A	H	H	A	H	A	A	H	A	H	A	H	A	A	H
Result	W	W	W	W	W	D	L	L	W	D	D	L	W	W	W	D	D	W	L	W	L	D	W	W	D	W	W	D	L	L	W	W	W

Updated to match(es) played on 27 October 2018. Source: See Results
A = Away; H = Home; W = Win; D = Draw; L = Loss

==== Results ====
8 April 2018 1	RoPS	2 – 0	IFK Mariehamn	Rovaniemi
17:00 EEST (UTC+3)	Lingman 53'; S.Roiha 80'	Report	J.Mattsson (yellow card) 88'	Stadium: Rovaniemen keskuskenttä Attendance: 1,809; Referee: Atte Jussila

14 April 2018 2	VPS	0 – 1	RoPS	Vaasa
16:00 EEST (UTC+3)	Voutilainen (yellow card) 57'; I.Gueye (yellow card) 74'; E.Ciss (yellow card) 79'	Report	Lappalainen 24'	Stadium: Hietalahti Stadium; Attendance: 1,918; Referee: Mikko Leino

18 April 2018 3	KuPS	0 – 1	RoPS	Kuopio
18:30 EEST (UTC+3)	U.Nissilä (yellow card) 81'	Report	Hyvärinen 90+4'	Stadium: Kuopio Football Stadium; Attendance: 3,123; Referee: Ville Nevalainen

22 April 2018 4	RoPS	3 – 0	PS Kemi	Rovaniemi
16:00 EEST (UTC+3)	Lappalainen 20'; Ivanovski 38'; Agnaldo 56'	Report	Tano (yellow card) 40'; V.Shevchenko (yellow card) 54'	Stadium: Rovaniemen keskuskenttä Attendance: 2,922; Referee: Mikko Leino

25 April 2018 5	RoPS	2 – 0	Lahti	Rovaniemi
18:30 EEST (UTC+3)	Agnaldo 12'; Kuaté (yellow card) 79'; Reguero (yellow card) 90+1'; Lappalainen 90+3'	Report	Osipov (yellow card) 24'	Stadium: Rovaniemen keskuskenttä Attendance: 1,721; Referee: Marko Grönholm

28 April 2018 6	TPS	0 – 0	RoPS	Turku
17:00 EEST (UTC+3)	M.Tenho (yellow card) 45+1'	Report		Stadium: Veritas Stadion; Attendance: 3,009; Referee: Jari Järvinen

3 May 2018 7	RoPS	1 – 2	Honka	Rovaniemi
18:30 EEST (UTC+3)	Okkonen (yellow card) 20'; Kuaté (yellow card) 41'; Lappalainen 44'	Report	Kandji 76'; Rahimi 90+2'	Stadium: Rovaniemen keskuskenttä Attendance: 1,973; Referee: Mohammad Al Emara

7 May 2018 8	Ilves	1 – 0	RoPS	Tampere
18:30 EEST (UTC+3)	Onduku 25'; Rannankari (yellow card) 46'; Tamminen (yellow card) 74'; T.Siira (yellow card) 90+1'	Report	L.Järvenpää (yellow card) 82'; Taiwo (yellow card) 90+1'; Lingman (yellow card) 90+9'	Stadium: Tammelan Stadion; Attendance: 3,190; Referee: Ville Nevalainen

13 May 2018 9	RoPS	2 – 0	KuPS	Rovaniemi
18:30 EEST (UTC+3)	M.Pitkänen 26' (o.g.); Muinonen (yellow card) 89'; Ivanovski 90+5'	Report	M.Töyräs (yellow card) 27'; Karjalainen (yellow card) 30'; Gabriel (yellow card) 39' (yellow-red card) 58'; Toivomäki (yellow card) 46'; Rexhepi (yellow card) 52'; Purje (yellow card) 87'; Matulevičius (yellow card) 90+7'	Stadium: Rovaniemen keskuskenttä Attendance: 2,934; Referee: Jari Järvinen

18 May 2018 10	Lahti	0 – 0	RoPS	Lahti
18:30 EEST (UTC+3)		Report		Stadium: Lahti Stadium; Attendance: 2,133; Referee: Antti Munukka

26 May 2018 11	Inter Turku	3 – 3	RoPS	Turku
15:00 EEST (UTC+3)	Kuningas 33'; Furuholm 50', 78'; T.Varmanen (yellow card) 61'	Report	Ivanovski 13', 18'; J.Hämäläinen (yellow card) 32'; Väisänen (yellow card) 58'; Kuaté (yellow card) 83' (yellow-red card) 88'; Lingman 90+3'	Stadium: Veritas Stadion; Attendance: 1,914; Referee: Mattias Gestranius

1 June 2018 12	RoPS	1 – 2	HJK	Rovaniemi
18:30 EEST (UTC+3)	L.Järvenpää 90+3'	Report	Klauss 52', 88'	Stadium: Rovaniemen keskuskenttä Attendance: 4,013; Referee: Ville Nevalainen

12 June 2018 13	RoPS	1 – 0	VPS	Rovaniemi
18:30 EEST (UTC+3)	Geffrard (yellow card) 84'; Okkonen 90+5'	Report	Meerits (yellow card) 90+6'	Stadium: Rovaniemen keskuskenttä Attendance: 2,111; Referee: Atte Jussila

16 June 2018 14	IFK Mariehamn	1 – 3	RoPS	Mariehamn
19:15 EEST (UTC+3)	Kangaskolkka 2'; Tatomirović (yellow card) 67'; Maripuu (yellow card) 90+3'	Report	Kuaté 25' (yellow card) 34'; Heikkilä 67'; Lingman 85'	Stadium: Wiklöf Holding Arena; Attendance: 1,795; Referee: Mattias Gestranius

21 June 2018 15	PS Kemi	0 – 1	RoPS	Kemi
17:30 EEST (UTC+3)	Vidjeskog (yellow card) 81'	Report	Okkonen (yellow card) 4'; Ivanovski 53' (yellow card) 71'; Hämäläinen (yellow card) 83'	Stadium: Sauvosaaren Urheilupuisto; Attendance: 3,650; Referee: Petri Viljanen

26 June 2018 16	RoPS	0 – 0	TPS	Rovaniemi
18:30 EEST (UTC+3)	Roiha (yellow card) 64'; Heikkilä (yellow card) 88'; Lingman (yellow card) 90+3'	Report	Rähmönen (yellow card) 61'; Ahde (yellow card) 73'	Stadium: Rovaniemen keskuskenttä Attendance: 2,822; Referee: Jani Laaksonen

30 June 2018 17	Honka	2 – 2	RoPS	Tapiola
15:00 EEST (UTC+3)	Kandji 16', 84'; Hervás (yellow card) 76'	Report	Taiwo (yellow card) 23'; Ivanovski 40'; Roiha 45+1'	Stadium: Tapiolan Urheilupuisto; Attendance: 1,632; Referee: Mikko Leino

4 July 2018 18	RoPS	2 – 0	Ilves	Rovaniemi
18:30 EEST (UTC+3)	Okkonen (yellow card) 23'; Hämäläinen (yellow card) 57'; Kokko (yellow card) 67'; Tanska 79' (o.g.); Lingman 88' (pen.)	Report	Tanska (yellow card) 87'	Stadium: Rovaniemen keskuskenttä Attendance: 2,850; Referee: Mattias Gestranius

9 July 2018 19	SJK	2 – 1	RoPS	Seinäjoki
18:30 EEST (UTC+3)	Mero (yellow card) 42'; Bååth 63'; Laaksonen 72'	Report	Agnaldo (yellow card) 87'; Lingman 90+4'	Stadium: OmaSP Stadion; Attendance: 2,814; Referee: Ville Nevalainen

21 July 2018 20	RoPS	1 – 0	SJK	Rovaniemi
17:00 EEST (UTC+3)	Hämäläinen (yellow card) 59'; Roiha 64' (yellow card) 65'	Report	Hurme (yellow card) 34'; Klinga (yellow card) 68'	Stadium: Rovaniemen keskuskenttä Attendance: 2,439; Referee: Joni Hyytiä

26 July 2018 21	RoPS	0 – 1	Inter Turku	Rovaniemi
18:30 EEST (UTC+3)		Report	Kamy 82' (yellow card) 85'	Stadium: Rovaniemen keskuskenttä Attendance: 3,315; Referee: Kalle Mäkinen

4 August 2018 22	HJK	2 – 2	RoPS	Helsinki
17:00 EEST (UTC+3)	Annan (yellow card) 14'; Dahlström 45'; Obilor (yellow card) 47'; Klauss 88'	Report	Taiwo 54'; Hambo 81'	Stadium: Telia 5G -areena Attendance: 3,012; Referee: Jari Järvinen

12 August 2018 23	RoPS	1 – 0	IFK Mariehamn	Rovaniemi
18:30 EEST (UTC+3)	Hambo 86'	Report	Kojola (yellow card) 49'; Kangaskolkka (yellow card) 49'; Maripuu (yellow card) 88'	Stadium: Rovaniemen keskuskenttä Attendance: 2,392; Referee: Atte Jussila

20 August 2018 24	Lahti	1 – 2	RoPS	Lahti
18:30 EEST (UTC+3)	Vyatkin 58'; Osipov (yellow card) 75'; Hauhia (yellow card) 79'	Report	Roiha 25'; Zeneli 68'; Gorozia (yellow card) 90+2'	Stadium: Lahti Stadium; Attendance: 1,615; Referee: Petri Viljanen

25 August 2018 25	Inter Turku	0 – 0	RoPS	Turku
17:00 EEST (UTC+3)	Guevara (yellow card) 19'; Furuholm (yellow card) 90+2'	Report		Stadium: Veritas Stadion; Attendance: 1,680; Referee: Dennis Antamo

31 August 2018 26	RoPS	2 – 1	Honka	Rovaniemi
18:30 EEST (UTC+3)	Gorozia 23' (yellow card) 90+5'; Hambo 26' (yellow card) 90+3' (yellow-red card) 90+8'	Report	Rahimi 52'; Kaufmann (yellow card) 89'	Stadium: Rovaniemen keskuskenttä Attendance: 2,879; Referee: Mikko Leino

14 September 2018 27	PS Kemi	0 – 2	RoPS	Kemi
17:30 EEST (UTC+3)	Kaljumäe (yellow card) 16'; Heinolainen (yellow card) 65'	Report	Zeneli 8'; Lappalainen 71'	Stadium: Sauvosaaren Urheilupuisto; Attendance: 2,248; Referee: Ville Nevalainen

17 September 2018 28	RoPS	1 – 1	KuPS	Rovaniemi
18:30 EEST (UTC+3)	Agnaldo (yellow card) 42'; Lappalainen 75'	Report	Karjalainen 72'	Stadium: Rovaniemen keskuskenttä Attendance: 2,916; Referee: Mohammad Al Emara

21 September 2018 29	HJK	3 – 0	RoPS	Helsinki
18:30 EEST (UTC+3)	Pirinen (yellow card) 28'; Klauss 30'; Vertainen 56', 90+1'; Jalasto (yellow card) 73'; Patronen (yellow card) 87'; Riski (yellow card) 87'	Report	Lingman (yellow card) 74'; Geffrard (red card) 90'	Stadium: Telia 5G -areena Attendance: 4,021; Referee: Atte Jussila

30 September 2018 30	RoPS	0 – 1	SJK	Rovaniemi
18:30 EEST (UTC+3)	Kokko (yellow card) 85'	Report	Hetemaj (yellow card) 12'; Oliynyk 19' (yellow card) 26'; Klinga (yellow card) 64'; Hatakka (yellow card) 69'; Hurme (yellow card) 82'; Opiyo (yellow card) 90'	Stadium: Rovaniemen keskuskenttä Attendance: 2,024; Referee: Jari Järvinen

6 October 2018 31	TPS	1 – 2	RoPS	Turku
16:00 EEST (UTC+3)	Ääritalo (yellow card) 42'; Yateke 52'	Report	Holma 7' (o.g.)	Stadium: Veritas Stadion; Attendance: 2,721; Referee: Dennis Antamo

21 October 2018 32	VPS	1 – 2	RoPS	Vaasa
14:30 EEST (UTC+3)	Voutilainen (yellow card) 26'; Vahtera 71'; David (yellow card) 90+3'	Report	Agnaldo 60' (pen.); Taiwo (yellow card) 81'; Lappalainen 89'	Stadium: Hietalahti Stadium; Attendance: 1,134; Referee: Joni Hyytiä

27 October 2018 33	RoPS	1 – 0	Ilves	Rovaniemi
15:00 EEST (UTC+3)	Lappalainen 44'; Zeneli (yellow card) 83'	Report	Tomas (yellow card) 90+2'	Stadium: Rovaniemen keskuskenttä Attendance: 2,875; Referee: Antti Munukka

=== Finnish Cup ===
==== Sixth Round ====
Team	Pld	W	D	L	GF	GA	GD	Pts
KuPS	5	5	0	0	22	6	+16	15
AC Oulu	5	3	1	1	13	12	+1	10
RoPS	5	2	1	2	12	7	+5	7
AC Kajaani	5	2	0	3	10	14	−4	6
PS Kemi	5	1	1	3	6	10	−4	4
MuSa	5	0	1	4	5	19	−14	1

27 January 2018 1	Musan Salama	0 – 6	RoPS	Pori
16:30 EET (UTC+2)	J.Välilä (yellow card) 38'; R.Dieter (yellow card) 69'; S.Mäkelä (yellow card) 86'	Report	Lingman 5'; S.Roiha 36', 39', 62'; M.Caliman 66', 82'	Stadium: Karhuhalli; Referee: Petri Viljanen

2 February 2018 2	RoPS	1 – 2	PS Kemi	Kemi
18:30 EET (UTC+2)	Lappalainen 81'	Report	Tano 56'; A.Isomäki 78'; K.Heinolainen (yellow card) 90+4'	Stadium: Junkohalli; Referee: Antti Leo

9 February 2018 3	RoPS	1 – 1	AC Oulu	Oulu
17:30 EET (UTC+2)	Agnaldo 39'; Okkonen (yellow card) 78'; Lingman (yellow card) 83'	Report	L.Nurmos (yellow card) 5'; Soto 56'; K.Koljonen (yellow card) 71'; A.Alvarado (yellow card) 72'	Stadium: Heinäpään urheilukeskus Referee: Jani Laaksonen

17 February 2018 4	RoPS	4 – 2	AC Kajaani	Rovaniemi
13:00 EET (UTC+2)	Agnaldo 2'; Geffrard (yellow card) 22' (goal) 44'; Lappalainen 29', 60'	Report	A.Nuutinen 4'; Ramírez (yellow card) 24' (goal) 74'; R.Kahelin (yellow card) 73'	Stadium: Ounashalli; Referee: Oskari Hämäläinen

10 March 2018 5	KuPS	2 – 0	RoPS	Kuopio
14:00 EET (UTC+2)	Pennanen 15'; I.Niskanen 65'; H.Coulibaly (yellow card) 84'; S.García (yellow card) 90'	Report		Stadium: Kuopio Football Stadium; Referee: Jani Laaksonen

== Squad statistics ==
As of Match played 27 October 2018

=== Appearances and goals ===
No.	Pos	Nat	Player	Total		Veikkausliiga		Finnish Cup	
No.	Pos	Nat	Player	Apps	Goals	Apps	Goals	Apps	Goals
3	DF	(Nigeria) NGA	Taye Taiwo	33	1	33	1	0	0
4	MF	(Finland) FIN	Antti Okkonen	34	1	20+9	1	5	0
5	DF	(Haiti) HAI	Jems Geffrard	24	1	9+11	0	4	1
6	MF	(Finland) FIN	Juho Hyvärinen	21	1	14+3	1	3+1	0
7	MF	(Georgia (country)) GEO	Giorgi Gorozia	13	1	7+6	1	0	0
8	MF	(Finland) FIN	Erfan Zeneli	11	2	10+1	2	0	0
9	FW	(Finland) FIN	Vahid Hambo	10	3	7+3	3	0	0
10	MF	(Finland) FIN	Lucas Lingman	37	6	30+2	5	3+2	1
11	MF	(Brazil) BRA	Agnaldo	25	5	18+3	3	4	2
12	GK	(Finland) FIN	Juhani Kangas	1	0	0	0	1	0
13	DF	(Finland) FIN	Lassi Järvenpää	31	1	23+4	1	3+1	0
14	MF	(Finland) FIN	Eetu Muinonen	27	0	20+2	0	4+1	0
15	DF	(Finland) FIN	Leo Väisänen	29	0	24	0	5	0
17	FW	(Finland) FIN	Sampo Ala	1	0	0	0	1	0
18	MF	(Finland) FIN	Veka Pyyny	10	0	2+7	0	1	0
19	FW	(Finland) FIN	Jarkko Luiro	1	0	0+1	0	0	0
20	FW	(Finland) FIN	Simo Roiha	32	7	16+11	4	4+1	3
22	MF	(Finland) FIN	Rasmus Degerman	7	0	2+5	0	0	0
24	FW	(Finland) FIN	Lassi Lappalainen	31	11	25+1	8	5	3
25	GK	(Spain) ESP	Antonio Reguero	37	0	33	0	4	0
26	DF	(Japan) JPN	Fugo Segawa	11	0	2+4	0	4+1	0
47	DF	(Finland) FIN	Juuso Hämäläinen	29	0	26+1	0	1+1	0
87	FW	(Finland) FIN	Aleksandr Kokko	8	1	3+5	1	0	0
Players away from the club on loan:
Players who left RoPS during the season:
7	MF	(Brazil) BRA	Matheus Caliman	4	2	0	0	1+3	2
8	MF	(Portugal) POR	Wato Kuaté	18	1	17	1	1	0
9	FW	(North Macedonia) MKD	Filip Ivanovski	16	6	13+3	6	0	0
21	MF	(Finland) FIN	Aapo Heikkilä	20	1	9+7	1	1+3	0

=== Goal scorers ===
Place	Position	Nation	Number	Name	Veikkausliiga	Finnish Cup	Total
1	FW	(Finland)	24	Lassi Lappalainen	8	3	11
1	FW	(Finland)	20	Simo Roiha	4	3	7
3	FW	(North Macedonia)	9	Filip Ivanovski	6	0	6
3	MF	(Finland)	10	Lucas Lingman	5	1	6
5	MF	(Brazil)	11	Agnaldo	3	2	5
6	FW	(Finland)	9	Vahid Hambo	3	0	3
6				Own goal	3	0	3
8	MF	(Finland)	8	Erfan Zeneli	2	0	2
8	MF	(Brazil)	7	Matheus Caliman	0	2	2
10	MF	(Finland)	6	Juho Hyvärinen	1	0	1
10	DF	(Finland)	13	Lassi Järvenpää	1	0	1
10	MF	(Finland)	4	Antti Okkonen	1	0	1
10	MF	(Portugal)	8	Wato Kuaté	1	0	1
10	MF	(Finland)	21	Aapo Heikkilä	1	0	1
10	DF	(Nigeria)	3	Taye Taiwo	1	0	1
10	MF	(Georgia (country))	7	Giorgi Gorozia	1	0	1
10	FW	(Finland)	87	Aleksandr Kokko	1	0	1
10	DF	(Haiti)	5	Jems Geffrard	0	1	1
TOTALS					42	12	54

=== Disciplinary record ===
Number	Nation	Position	Name	Veikkausliiga		Finnish Cup		Total	
Number	Nation	Position	Name	Booked	Sent off (straight red)	Booked	Sent off (straight red)	Booked	Sent off (straight red)
3	(Nigeria)	DF	Taye Taiwo	3	0	0	0	3	0
4	(Finland)	MF	Antti Okkonen	3	0	1	0	4	0
5	(Haiti)	DF	Jems Geffrard	1	1	1	0	2	1
6	(Finland)	MF	Juho Hyvärinen	1	0	0	0	1	0
7	(Georgia (country))	MF	Giorgi Gorozia	2	0	0	0	2	0
8	(Finland)	MF	Erfan Zeneli	1	0	0	0	1	0
9	(Finland)	FW	Vahid Hambo	2	1	0	0	2	1
10	(Finland)	MF	Lucas Lingman	3	0	1	0	4	0
11	(Brazil)	MF	Agnaldo	2	0	0	0	2	0
13	(Finland)	DF	Lassi Järvenpää	1	0	0	0	1	0
14	(Finland)	MF	Eetu Muinonen	1	0	0	0	1	0
15	(Finland)	DF	Leo Väisänen	1	0	0	0	1	0
20	(Finland)	FW	Simo Roiha	2	0	0	0	2	0
25	(Spain)	GK	Antonio Reguero	2	0	0	0	2	0
47	(Finland)	DF	Juuso Hämäläinen	4	0	0	0	4	0
87	(Finland)	FW	Aleksandr Kokko	2	0	0	0	2	0
Players who left RoPS during the season:
8	(Portugal)	MF	Wato Kuaté	5	1	0	0	5	1
9	(North Macedonia)	FW	Filip Ivanovski	1	0	0	0	1	0
21	(Finland)	MF	Aapo Heikkilä	1	0	0	0	1	0
TOTALS				37	3	3	0	40	3
