= Taye Taiwo =

Nigerian footballer (born 1985)

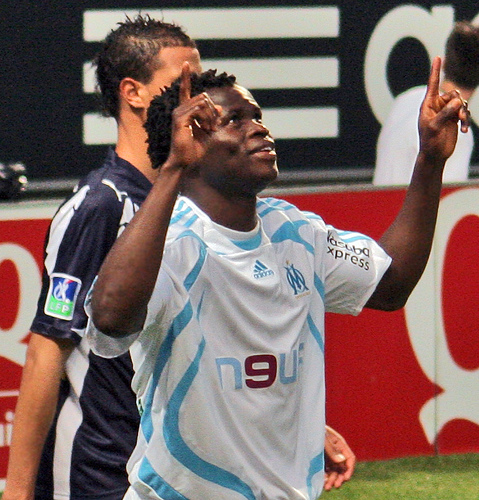
- Taiwo playing for Marseille in 2008

Personal information
- Full name: Taye Taiwo
- Date of birth: 16 April 1985 (age 41)
- Place of birth: Lagos, Nigeria
- Height: 1.83 m (6 ft 0 in)
- Position: Left back

Youth career
- 2003–2004: Gabros
- 2004: Lobi Stars

Senior career*
| Years | Team | Apps | (Gls) |
| 2005–2011 | Marseille | 192 | (17) |
| 2011–2013 | AC Milan | 4 | (0) |
| 2012 | → Queens Park Rangers (loan) | 15 | (1) |
| 2012–2013 | → Dynamo Kyiv (loan) | 20 | (0) |
| 2013–2015 | Bursaspor | 27 | (2) |
| 2015–2016 | HJK Helsinki | 32 | (6) |
| 2017 | Lausanne-Sport | 13 | (0) |
| 2017 | AFC Eskilstuna | 9 | (0) |
| 2018–2019 | RoPS | 60 | (2) |
| 2020 | Doxa Katokopias | 0 | (0) |
| 2020–2021 | Palm Beach Stars | 1 | (0) |
| 2021–2022 | Sant'Angelo | 5 | (0) |
| 2022 | SalPa | 6 | (0) |
| Total | | 384 | (28) |

International career
| 2004–2012 | Nigeria | 54 | (5) |
- * Club domestic league appearances and goals

Taye Taiwo (born 16 April 1985) is a Nigerian former professional footballer who played as a left-back.

Having been in the ranks of Gabros International and Lobi Stars, Taiwo moved to France and joined Marseille in 2005, where he had a successful spell at the club, winning one Ligue 1, two Coupe de la Ligue and one Trophée des Champions. Taiwo then joined Serie A side AC Milan in the summer of 2011. Rarely used, he left the Italian side after two seasons, following two loan spells in Queens Park Rangers and Dynamo Kyiv.

== Club career ==
=== Marseille ===
Born in Lagos, Nigeria, Taiwo began his football career at Nigeria Division 1 club Gabros International and Nigeria Premier League side, Lobi Stars. On 10 January 2005, at the age of 19, Taiwo moved to France when he was signed by French club, Marseille, signing a three–year contract, with a reported transfer fee costing 200,000 euros. Taiwo was brought in to fill the void Bixente Lizarazu had left when he departed for Bayern Munich. At the end of January, Taiwo officially moved to the club.

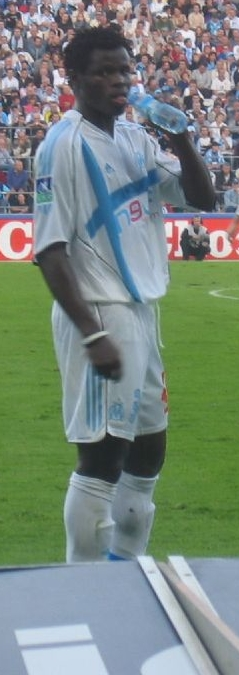
Taiwo drinking a water bottle during a match for Marseille in 2005.

On 12 March 2005 manager Philippe Troussier called him to the first team and made his debut for Marseille, starting a match and played 61 minutes before being substituted, as the club won 2–1 against RC Lens. After the match, Foot Marseille said about Taiwo's performance: "For his debut in White, this athletic Nigerian started well with a goal ball for Luyindula and a few good interventions then seemed completely lost on the pitch never knowing how to position himself. His second half confirmed these incredible mistakes. He will hardly be able to do worse but given his age and his physique, he will surely speak of him better, much better." After sitting for the next six matches due to competitions from fellow left–back players Salomon Olembé and Kōji Nakata, Taiwo went on to start the remaining three matches of the 2004–05 season, as the club went on to finish fifth place in the league. At the end of the 2004–05 season, he went on to make a total of four appearances in all competitions for the side.

==== 2005–06 season ====
Ahead of the 2005–06 season, Taiwo was linked a move to Eredivisie side PSV Eindhoven, with a player exchange involving Lee Young-pyo moving to the opposite direction, but Marseille's president Pape Diouf dismissed the move from happening. The transfer speculation ended when he signed a contract extension with the club, keeping him until 2009. Taiwo started the season well when he established himself in the first team, playing in the left–back position. Taiwo then scored his first goal of the season, in a 3–2 win against Young Boys in the first leg of the 2005 UEFA Intertoto Cup's third round. In the return leg, he set up the winning goal for Samir Nasri, in a 2–1 win to send the club progress to the next round. Taiwo later helped Marseille win the Intertoto Cup after beating Lazio and Deportivo de La Coruña. On 14 August 2005 he scored his second goal for the club, in a 1–1 draw against Lyon. Taiwo played in both legs of the UEFA Cup first round against Germinal Beerschot and helped Marseille win 4–1 in the penalty shootout after playing in a 0–0 draw throughout the combined minutes of 210 minutes, in which he successfully converted in the shootout. After serving a one match suspension, Taiwo scored on his return to the starting line–up, in a 1–0 win against Heerenveen on 24 November 2005 to help Marseille qualify for the UEFA Cup knockout stage. After missing the whole January due to his international commitment, he returned to the starting line–up against Toulouse on 12 February 2006 and helped the club keep a clean sheet, in a 1–0 win. Following his return, Taiwo continued to regain his first team place, playing in the left–back position. After serving a one match suspension once again, he scored on his return to the starting line–up in the semi–finals of the Coupe de France against Rennes and helped Marseille keep a clean sheet, in a 3–0 win to reach the Coupe de France Final. Eight days later on 29 April 2006, Taiwo started in the final against Paris Saint-Germain, as the club lost 2–1. At the end of the 2005–06 season, he made fifty appearances and scoring four times in all competitions.

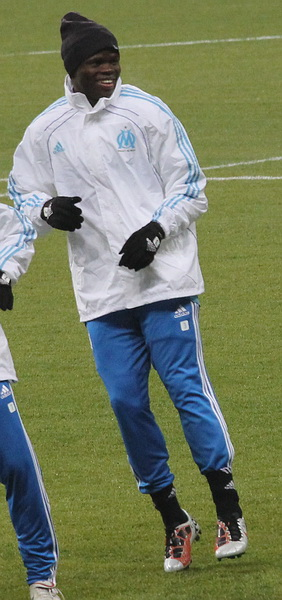
Taiwo training for Marseille prior to a match.

==== 2006–07 season ====
Ahead of the 2006–07 season, Taiwo's performances at Marseille and African Cup of Nations attracted interests from European clubs. But he wanted to stay at the club. Taiwo started the season well when he played in both legs of the UEFA Intertoto Cup against Dnipro, as the club won on away goals rule following a 2–2 draw in the return leg. However, Taiwo was sent–off for a straight red card in the 4th minute against Young Boys in the UEFA Cup Qualification Round, as Marseille won on away goals rule following a 3–3 on aggregate. He then helped the club keep four consecutive clean sheets in the first four league matches for the side. On 17 September 2006 Taiwo scored his first goal of the season in a 2–1 win against Bordeaux. He then scored his second goal of the season in the return leg of the UEFA Cup first round against Mladá Boleslav, as Marseille lost 4–2 on aggregate. Three days later on 1 October 2006, Taiwo scored his third goal of the season, in a 3–0 win against Toulouse. However, he was sent–off for a straight red card in the 56th minute, as the club lost 4–1 against Lyon on 22 October 2006 and served a two match suspension as a result. Taiwo returned to the starting line–up against FC Lorient on 4 November 2006, as Marseille lost 1–0. Following his return from suspension, he continued to regain his first team place, playing in the left–back position. On 24 January 2007 Taiwo scored his fourth goal of the season, in a 3–1 win against Auxerre. He then helped the club progress through Coupe de France, eventually reaching to the final. In the final against Sochaux, Taiwo started the whole game throughout the 120 minutes following a 2–2 draw and was the first penalty taker to successfully convert in the penalty shootout, as Marseille lost 5–4 in the shootout, therefore losing another final. At the end of the 2006–07 season, he went on to make 47 appearances and scoring four times in all competitions.

==== 2007–08 season ====
Ahead of the 2007–08 season, Taiwo continued to be linked a move away from Marseille, with European clubs, especially Valencia interested in signing him. He started in the opening game of the season against Strasbourg and helped the club keep a clean sheet in a 0–0 draw. After being dropped for the next two matches, Taiwo returned to the starting line–up against Nancy on 19 August 2007 and set up Marseille's first goal of the game, in a 2–2 draw. He continued to regain his first team place, playing in the left–back position. Taiwo then made his UEFA Champions League debut against Beşiktaş on 18 September 2007 and kept a clean sheet, in a 2–0 win. However, in a match against Saint-Étienne on 6 October 2007, he was sent–off for a second bookable offence, in a 1–0 loss and served a two match suspension as a result. After serving a two match suspension, Taiwo returned to the starting line–up against Lorient on 3 November 2007 and was then substituted at half time as the club drew 0–0. This led him to being dropped to the substitute bench after his performance received criticism from supporters and media alike. On 28 November 2007 Taiwo returned to the starting line–up for Marseille and scored his first UEFA Champions League goal, in a 2–1 loss against Beşiktaş. He then started the next five matches for the rest of the year before being called up by Nigeria for the African Cup of Nations. While on international duty, Taiwo was linked a move away from the club following the new signing of Juan Krupoviesa, but he made it clear that he wanted to stay at Marseille. Following the end of the tournament, on 10 February 2008, he returned to the first team, coming on as a second-half substitute in a 2–0 win against Nice. Three days later on 13 February 2008, Taiwo scored his second goal of the season, in a 3–0 win against Spartak Moscow in the first leg of the UEFA Cup third round. This was followed up by scoring against rivals, Paris Saint-Germain, as the club won 2–1. Two weeks later on 6 March 2008, he captained the club for the first time against Zenit Saint Petersburg in the first leg of the UEFA Cup Last 16 and set up Marseille's first goal of the game, in a 3–1 win. Three days later on 9 March 2008, Taiwo scored his fourth goal of the season, in a 2–0 win against Saint-Étienne. On 27 April 2008 he scored again, in a 3–2 win against AS Monaco. Since returning from his international commitment, Taiwo regained his first team place, playing in the left–back position for the rest of the season. It was announced that both he signed another contract extension in April 2008, keeping him until 2011. For his performance, Taiwo was named Trophées UNFP du football's Team of the Year. At the end of the 2007–08 season, he made forty appearances and scoring five times in all competitions.

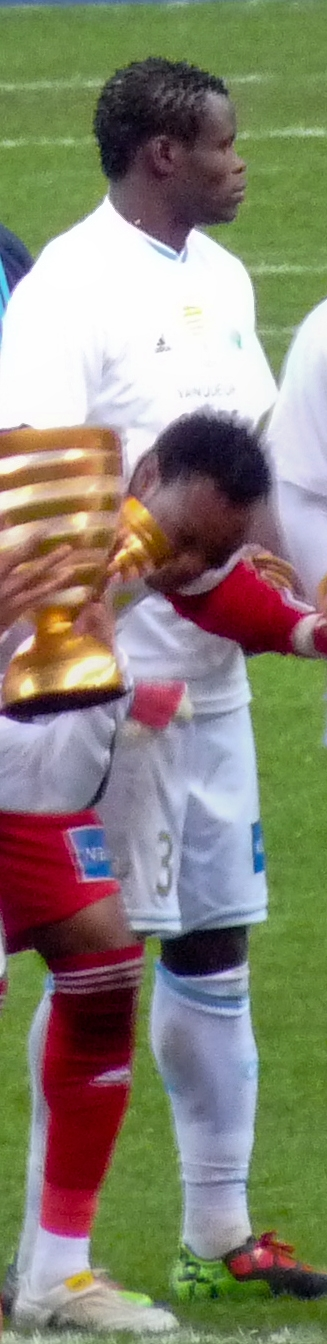
Taiwo celebrating with teammates following Marseille's win over Bordeaux in the Coupe de la Ligue Final.

==== 2008–09 season ====
At the start of the 2008–09 season, Taiwo made his 100th appearance for Marseille in the opening game of the season against Rennes and set up Marseille's third goal of the game, in a 4–4 draw. He played in both legs of the UEFA Champions League Third qualifying round against Brann, as Marseille won 3–1 on aggregate to qualify for the Group stage. Taiwo continued to regain his first team place, playing in the left–back position for the club. During a 2–1 loss against Atlético Madrid on 1 October 2008, Taiwo was subjected of a racist chant from the opposition's supporters. On 1 November 2008 he scored his first goal of the season, in a 3–1 win against Saint-Étienne. Taiwo then captained the club for the first time this season against Besançon RC in the first round of Coupe de France, scored the equalising goal and played 120 minutes following a 1–1 draw, in which he successfully converted in the penalty shootout, as Marseille won 5–4 in the shootout to go to the next round. During a 1–0 loss against Sochaux on 1 February 2009, Taiwo was at fault when he conceded the only goal of the game. After the match, Manager Eric Gerets criticised his performance. Taiwo made amends of his performance by helping the club keep five clean sheets in the next five matches between 8 February 2009 and 7 March 2009. He then played in both legs against Twente in the third round of the UEFA Cup and played combined minutes of 210 minutes following a 1–1 draw on aggregate, in which he successfully converted in the shootout, as Marseille won 7–6 on penalties. Taiwo then scored twice for the side, in a 4–1 win against Grenoble on 12 April 2009. However, he suffered a groin injury during a 2–1 loss against Shakhtar Donetsk in the return leg of the UEFA Cup quarter–finals, resulting in the club's elimination from the tournament, and was sidelined for three weeks. On 13 May 2009 Taiwo returned to the starting line–up against OGC Nice and set up Marseille's second goal of the game, in a 2–0 win. The club were unsuccessful to win the league, as they finished second place behind Bordeaux. For his performance once again, he was named Trophées UNFP du football's Team of the Year for the second time in his career. At the end of the 2008–09 season, Taiwo went on to make fifty–two appearances and scoring four times in all competitions.

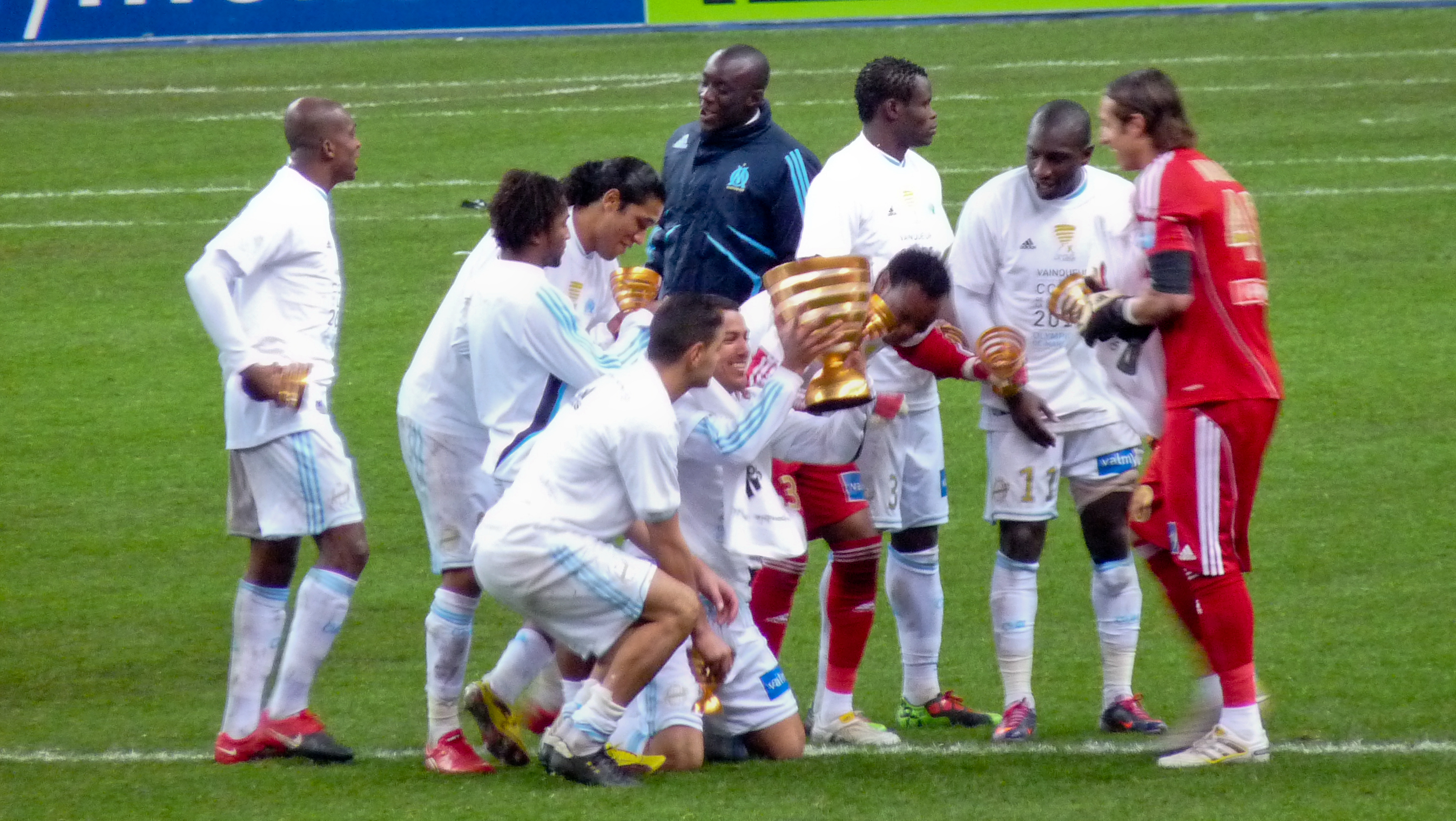
Taiwo (third right) celebrating with teammates following Marseille's win over Bordeaux in the Coupe de la Ligue Final.

==== 2009–10 season ====
Ahead of the 2009–10 season, Taiwo was linked a move away from Marseille following reports about his dream to play in the Premier League. But he announced his intention to stay at the club. At the start of the 2009–10 season, Taiwo started in the left–back position in Marseille's first seven matches to the season. This lasted until he suffered a knee injury during a 4–2 win against Montpellier on 19 September 2009 and was substituted at the second half. On 30 September 2009 Taiwo returned to the starting line–up against Real Madrid in the UEFA Champions League match, as the club lost 3–0. After returning to the first team, he was dropped to the first team between 17 October 2009 and 8 November 2009 when Manager Didier Deschamps preferred Gabriel Heinze playing in the position. By mid–November, Taiwo regained his first team place when Heinze returned to playing in the centre–back position. On 12 December 2009 he scored his first goal of the season in a 2–0 win against US Boulogne. After the end of the African Cup of Nations, Taiwo returned to the starting line–up against Valenciennes on 7 February 2010, as the club won 5–1. Since returning to the first team, he continued competing with Heinze over the left–back position for the rest of the 2009–10 season, which resulted in him being placed on the substitute bench. Taiwo then scored his second goal of the season, with a trademark left-footed strike from long range, in a 2–1 win against Lyon on 21 March 2010. In the Coupe de la Ligue Final against Bordeaux on 27 March 2010, he started the whole game, as Marseille won 3–1 to win the tournament. Taiwo then scored his third goal of the season, in a 2–1 win against Boulogne on 17 April 2010. In a match against Rennes on 5 May 2010, he came on as a 57th-minute substitute and played the rest of the game, they won 3–1, winning the league for the first time in eighteen years. At the end of the 2009–10 season, Taiwo went on to make thirty–seven appearances and scoring three times in all competitions.

==== 2010–11 season ====
Ahead of the 2010–11 season, Taiwo announced his intention to stay at Marseille, with a rumoured talks of a new contract negotiations began. However, he rejected a contract offer from the club, but stayed at Marseille for the 2010–11 season. In the Trophée des Champions match against Paris Saint-Germain, Taiwo captained and started the whole game throughout the 120 minutes following a 0–0 draw and was the first penalty taker to successfully convert in the penalty shootout, as Marseille won 5–4 in the shootout. He then scored two goals in two matches between 14 August 2010 and 21 August 2010 against Valenciennes and Lorient. A month later on 25 September 2010, Taiwo scored his fourth goal of the season, scoring a 35 meters strike, in a 2–1 win against Sochaux. However, Taiwo, once again, lost his first team place in the left–back position to Heinze. At times, he managed to regain his place when Heinze returned to playing in the centre–back position. Taiwo then set up two goals in two matches between 16 January 2011 and 19 January 2011, including one against Auxerre that send the club through to the Coupe de la Ligue final following a 2–0 win. On 17 April 2011, he scored his fourth goal of the season, in a 2–1 win against Montpellier. In a follow–up match against Montpellier in the Coupe de la Ligue final, Taiwo scored the only goal at the Stade de France to win the tournament and was named ICM Player of the Match. After the match, he grabbed a microphone and joined fans in singing an expletive-laden chant aimed at the club's rivals PSG, narrowly escaping a ban from the LFP. However, Taiwo received a one-match ban for his action, and apologised for his action. After serving a one match suspension, he returned to the starting line–up in the last game of the season against SM Caen and set up one of the goals, in a 2–2 draw, in what turned out to be his last appearance for Marseille. At the end of the 2010–11 season, Taiwo went on to make forty–one appearances and scoring five times in all competitions. For his performance, he was named Trophées UNFP du football's Team of the Year for the third time in his career.

Throughout the 2010–11 season, the club continued to try to convince Taiwo to sign a new contract, as the player, himself, wanted to stay at Marseille. However, Taiwo announced his intention to leave Marseille at the end of the 2010–11 season, to seek new challenge elsewhere.

=== AC Milan ===
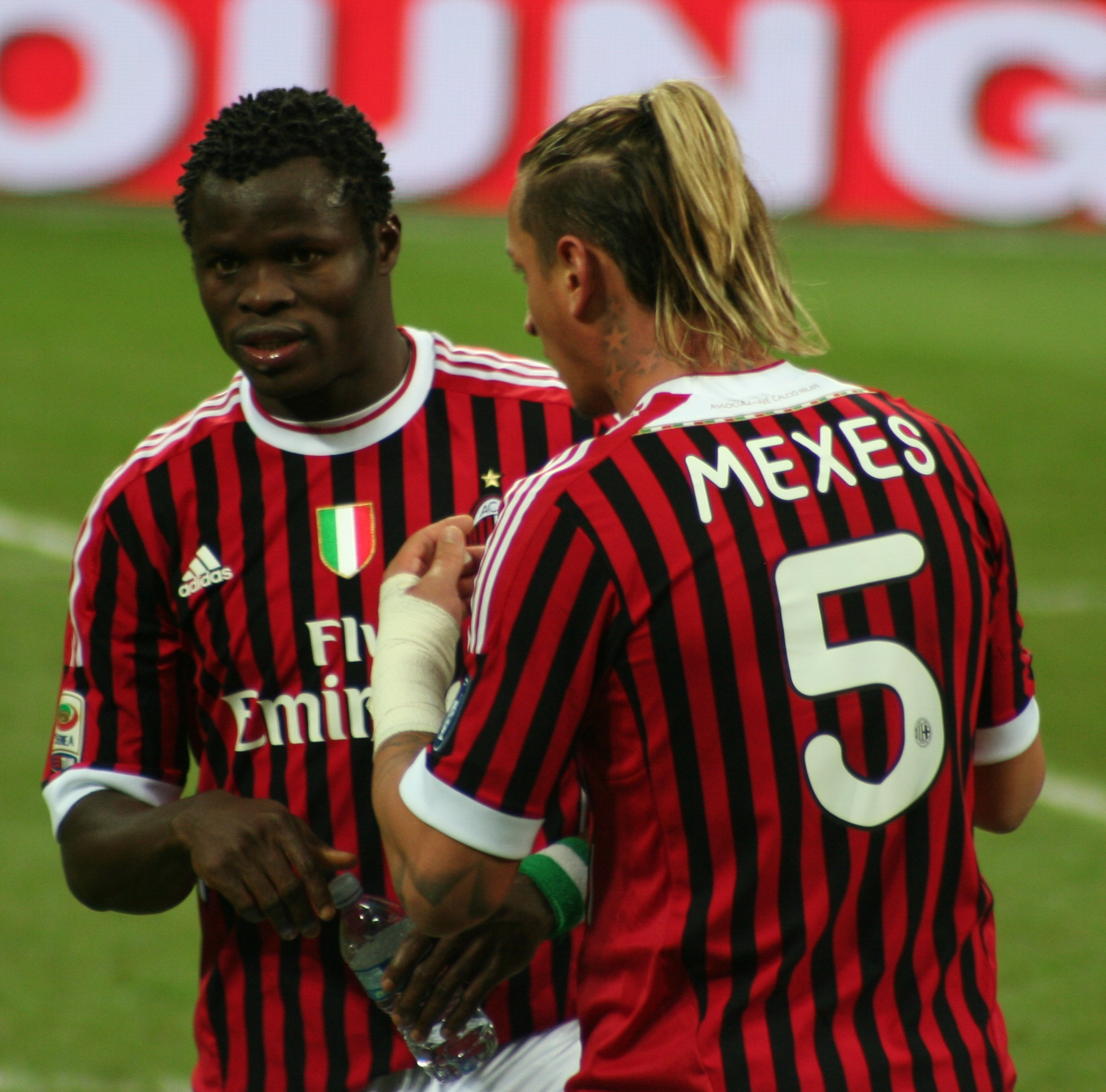
Taiwo having a prep talk with teammate Philippe Mexès during a match between AC Milan and Siena on 17 December 2011.

On 9 May 2011, AC Milan coach, Massimiliano Allegri, confirmed the signing of Taiwo along with French defender Philippe Mexès. The two were to play for Milan for the 2011–12 season.

However, he suffered ankle injury that saw him expected to be out for a month. Taiwo made his debut with the club on 24 September 2011 in the home league match won 1–0 against Cesena where he was eventually replaced by Luca Antonini. In December 2011, Taiwo made an interview for the French sports newspaper L'Équipe where he expressed his disappointment with his current experience at A.C. Milan, commenting on problems with Massimiliano Allegri and lack of playing time, having been placed on the substitute bench. As a result, Taiwo made six starts for the club in all competitions (eventually making a total of eight appearances). Despite the player spending much time on the substitutes bench, Taiwo reiterated his commitment to AC Milan.

==== Queens Park Rangers (loan) ====
On 24 January 2012, Queens Park Rangers secured the signing of Taiwo from A.C. Milan on a loan deal until the end of the season, with the option to buy for a fee of around £3.5 million. Upon joining the club, he was given a number 34 shirt. After making a move to Queens Park Rangers, Taiwo said he was expecting to make an impact at the club, rather than sitting on the bench.

Taiwo made his debut for Queens Park Rangers, starting the whole game against Aston Villa on 1 February 2012, where he played a role, leading Stephen Warnock to score an own goal, as the club drew 2–2. Since joining Queens Park Rangers, he quickly established himself in the first team, playing in the left–back position. Taiwo then set up the club's second goal of the game, in a 3–2 win against Liverpool on 21 March 2012. This was followed up by scoring his first goal for Queens Park Rangers through a fantastic executed curling effort from a free kick 27 yards out in a 3–1 defeat against Sunderland. On the last game of the season, Taiwo started the whole game, as Manchester City beat Queens Park Rangers 3–2, but Bolton Wanderers' failure to beat Stoke City, however, meant that QPR survived in the Premier League. At the end of the 2011–12 season, he went on to make fifteen appearances and scoring once in all competitions.

Despite reports claimed that Queens Park Rangers would be interested in signing Taiwo on a permanent basis, and the player, himself, would like to stay at the club, the club decided against signing him and he returned to his parent club.

==== Dynamo Kyiv (loan) ====
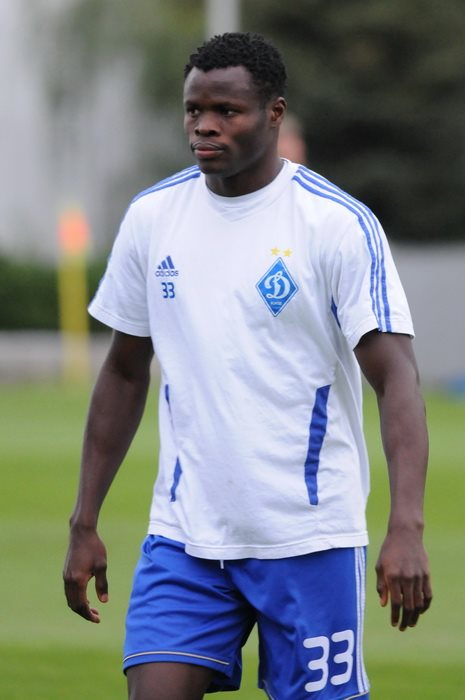
Taiwo training for Dynamo Kyiv in 2012.

Having previously said that he did not want to return to AC Milan, it was announced on 31 July 2012 that Taiwo joined Ukrainian club Dynamo Kyiv on a one-year loan deal with the option of making the move permanent at the end of the season. Upon joining the club, he was given a number 33 shirt.

Taiwo made his debut for Dynamo Kyiv against Kryvbas on 3 August 2012 and helped the club keep a clean sheet, in a 1–0 win. He then played in both legs against Borussia Mönchengladbach in the UEFA Champions League Play–Rounds, as the club won 4–3 on aggregate to progress to the Group stage. On 23 September 2012 Taiwo scored his first goal for Dynamo Kyiv, as they lost 4–1 against rivals, Shakhtar Donetsk in the third round of the Ukrainian Cup. Since making his debut for the club, he became a first team regular, playing in the left–back position in the first two months. This lasted until Taiwo was suspended for three matches after he was involved in altercation with Cleiton Xavier during Dynamo Kyiv's 3–1 loss against Metalist Kharkiv on 20 October 2012. After serving a three match suspension, he returned to the starting line–up against Metalurh Donetsk on 16 November 2012 and played the whole game, as the club lost 1–0. Since returning to the first team from suspension, Taiwo later found himself rotating in and out as the season goes by. At the end of the 2012–13 season, he went on to make thirty–one appearances and scoring once in all competitions. Following this, Taiwo returned to his parent club after Dynamo Kyiv decided against signing him on a permanent basis.

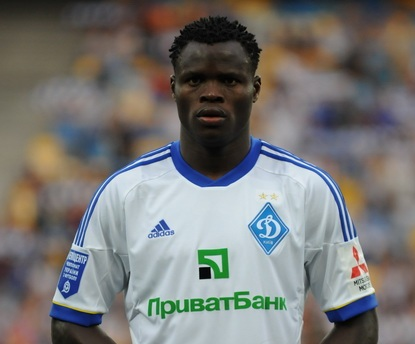
Taiwo about to play for Dynamo Kyiv prior to a match in 2012.

=== Bursaspor ===
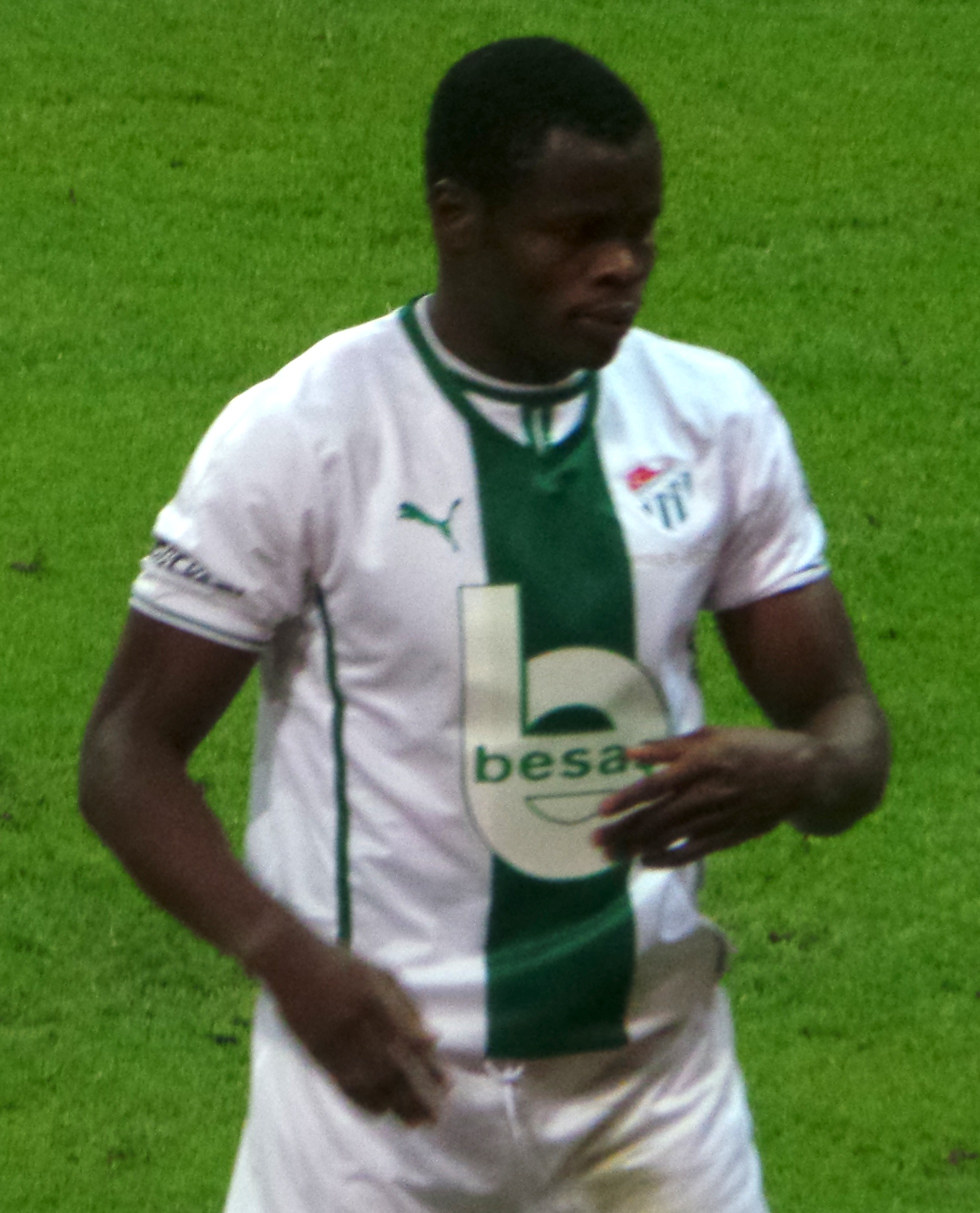
Taiwo playing for Bursaspor in 2014.

On 5 July 2013, Taiwo signed a three-year deal with Turkish side Bursaspor. He was linked with a move to the Premier League by joining newly promoted club Cardiff City, but opted to move to Turkey. Upon joining the club, Taiwo was given a number three shirt.

On 1 August 2013, Taiwo scored on his Bursaspor debut, in a 2–2 draw Vojvodina in the first leg of their Europa League third qualifying round tie. In the return leg, however, he started the whole game, as the club lost 3–0, eliminating them from the tournament. Taiwo then made his league debut for Bursaspor in the opening game of the season against Eskişehirspor, as the club lost 2–0. A week later on 30 August 2013 against Antalyaspor, he set up Bursaspor's second goal of the game, to give the club their first win of the season. Since joining Bursaspor, Taiwo quickly established himself in the first team, playing in the left–back position. He then helped the club keep three consecutive clean sheets between 4 October 2013 and 27 October 2013. On 9 November 2013 he scored his first goal for Bursaspor, in a 2–1 loss against Sivasspor. Three weeks later on 29 November 2013, Taiwo scored again, in a 2–1 win against Elazığspor. After the match, he was named the league's Team of the Week. Since the start of the 2013–14 season, Taiwo started in every match in the left–back position until February when he missed one match, due to tactical change. Following his return, he rotated in and out of the starting line–up for the rest of the season. At the end of the 2013–14 season, Taiwo went on to make thirty–seven appearances and scoring three times in all competitions.

Ahead of the 2014–15 season, Taiwo was linked a move away from Bursaspor, as the club wanted to cut cost as a result of their financial problems, but he ended up staying at the club. However, Manager Şenol Güneş didn't use him in the first team throughout the 2014–15 season, resulting in Taiwo not playing for twelve months. In February 2015, he was fined by Bursaspor after taking a leave without the club's permission. On 27 April 2015, Taiwo mutually agreed to have his contract terminated with Bursaspor.

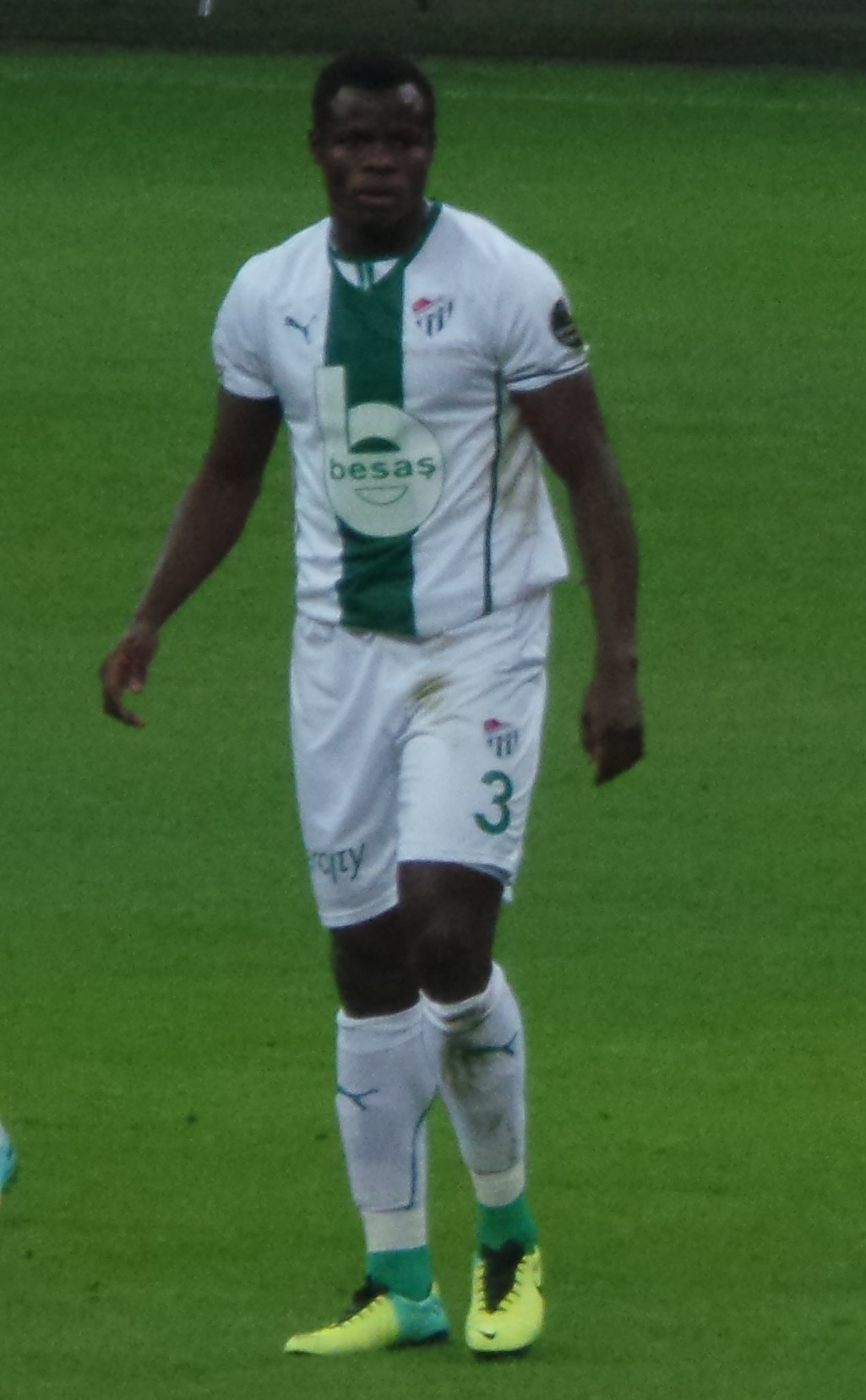
Taiwo playing for Bursaspor in 2014.

=== HJK ===
On 23 August 2015, Taiwo joined HJK Helsinki for the remainder of the season with an option for a one additional year.

The following day, he made his debut for the club, starting the whole game, in a 1–1 draw against HIFK Fotboll. Since making his debut for HJK Helsinki, Taiwo quickly established himself in the starting eleven, playing in the left–back position. However, the club finished third place in the league. In October of the same year, HJK exercised their option of keeping Taiwo under contract for the 2016 season. At the end of the 2015 season, he went on to make eleven appearances in all competitions.

Ahead of the 2016 season, Taiwo was linked a move away from HJK Helsinki, but he ended up staying at the club. Taiwo started the season well when he scored his first goal for HJK Helsinki in a 1–0 win against IFK Mariehamn in the Finnish League Cup. A week later on 9 February 2016, Taiwo scored his second goal of the season in another Finnish League Cup match, in a 3–3 draw against HIFK Fotboll. Since the start of the 2016 season, he continued to regain his first team place for the club, playing in the left–back position. Taiwo's goalscoring form continued for HJK Helsinki when he scored four goals between 7 May 2016 and 20 May 2016, including a brace against Inter Turku. As a result, he became the club's fan favourite. Taiwo then scored two goals in two consecutive matches between 12 June 2016 and 18 June 2016 against RoPS and SJK. He played in both legs of the UEFA Europa League first round against Atlantas and scored a goal himself, as HJK Helsinki won 3–1 on aggregate. However, Taiwo suffered an injury and was substituted in the 78th minute during the second leg of the UEFA Europa League second round, in a 1–0 win against Beroe, sending the club through to the next round. As a result, he was sidelined for two months. On 21 September 2016 Taiwo returned from injury against RoPS and set up HJK Helsinki's first goal in a 2–1 win. He then started in the final of the Finnish Cup against SJK and played 90 minutes before being substituted, as the club lost 7–6 in a penalty shootout following a 1–1 draw. Taiwo called time on his playing career with HJK Helsinki after their final league game against SJK on 23 October 2016. At the end of the 2016 season, he went on to make thirty–four appearances and scoring nine times in all competitions.

=== Lausanne-Sport ===
On 30 January 2017, Taiwo signed for Lausanne-Sport until the end of the 2016–17 season.

He made his debut for the club, coming on as a 66th-minute substitute, in a 4–4 draw against FC Luzern on 5 February 2017. Two weeks later on 19 February 2017, Taiwo made his first start for Lausanne, starting the whole game, in a 4–3 loss against Basel. However, he suffered an injury that saw him out for two matches. On 23 April 2017 Taiwo returned to the starting line–up in a 1–0 win against Sion. Despite this, he continued remain in the first team, playing in the left–back position for the rest of the 2016–17 season. Following this, Taiwo left Lausanne when his contract expired at the end of the 2016–17 season.

=== AFC Eskilstuna ===
It was announced on 9 August 2017 that Taiwo joined Allsvenskan side AFC Eskilstuna for the remainder of the season.

He made his debut for the club, starting the whole game in the left–back position, in a 3–1 win against Malmö on 19 August 2017. Taiwo became a first team regular for AFC Eskilstuna, playing in either the left–back and centre–back positions. However, he was unable to help the club avoid relegation from Allsvenskan. At the end of the 2017 season, Taiwo went on to make nine appearances in all competitions.

=== Rovaniemen Palloseura ===
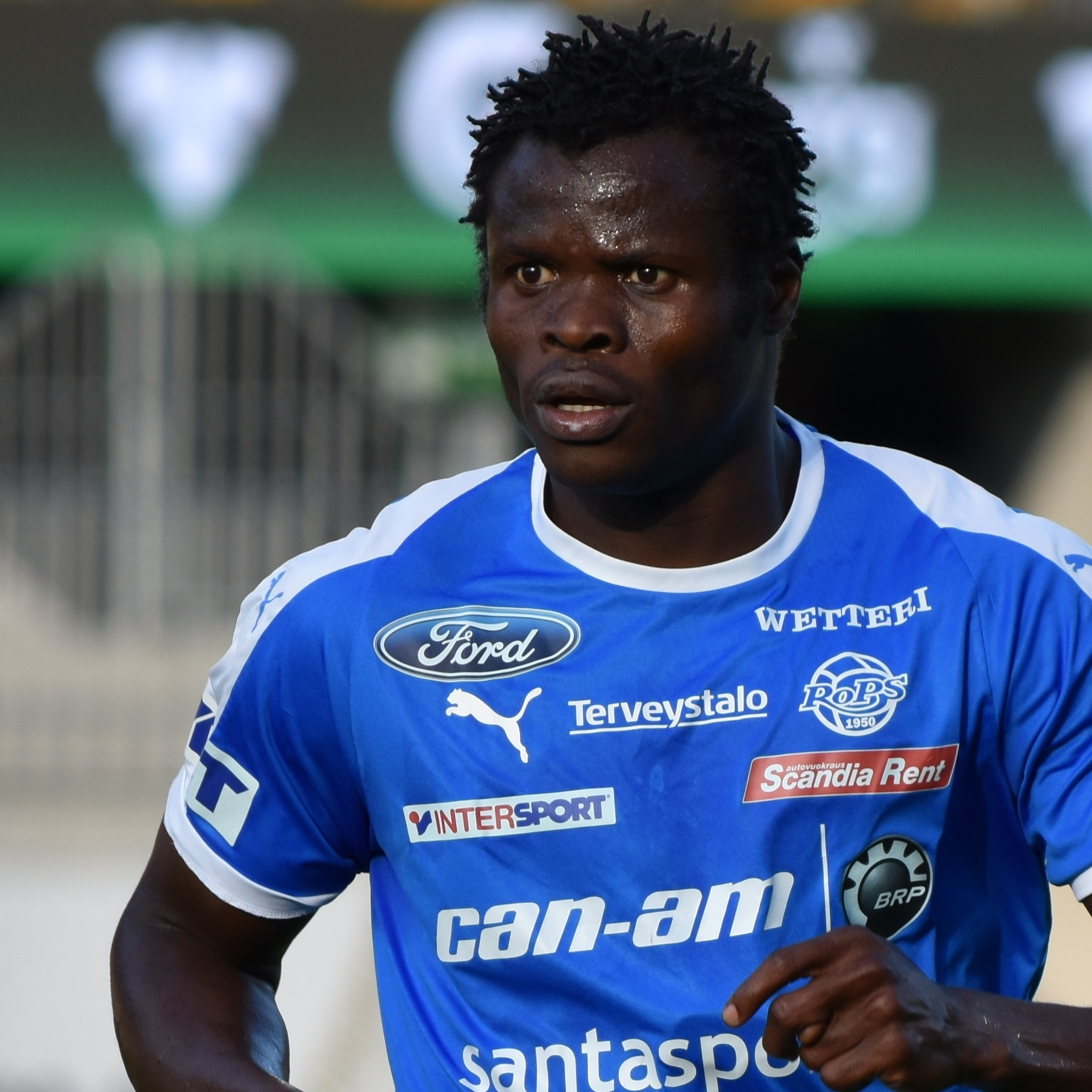
Taiwo playing for RoPS in 2018.

On 7 March 2018, Taiwo joined Veikkausliiga side Rovaniemen Palloseura for the 2018 season after leaving AFC Eskilstuna.

He made his debut for the club in the opening game of the season against IFK Mariehamn and kept a clean sheet, as Rovaniemen Palloseura won 2–0. This was followed up by keeping five clean sheets in the next five matches. Since making his debut for the club, Taiwo quickly established himself in the starting eleven, playing in the left–back position. At times, he played four times in the centre–back position. On 4 August 2018 Taiwo scored his first goal against his former club, HJK Helsinki, as Rovaniemen Palloseura drew 2–2. Despite missing one match, he went on to make thirty–two appearances and scoring once in all competitions. Following this, Taiwo signed a contract extension with the club for another season.

At the start of the 2019 season, Taiwo captained Rovaniemen Palloseura in the first two months to the season. He continued to regain his first team place, playing in the left–back position. However, in a match against KPV on 29 June 2019, Taiwo received a straight red card in the 29th minute, as the club drew 0–0. After the match, he had his two match suspension lifted and returned to the starting line–up in a follow–up match. On 21 September 2019 Taiwo scored his first goal of the season in a 4–1 defeat against KPV. By the end of the 2019 season, he had made 31 appearances, scoring once in all competitions.

=== Later career ===
On 3 July 2020, Taiwo signed for Cypriot First Division club Doxa Katokopias after leaving ROPS. However, he failed to make a single appearances for the club and it was announced on 22 October 2020 that Taiwo joined American club Palm Beach Stars in the United Premier Soccer League.

In December 2021, Taiwo returned for a third spell in Finland when he joined third-tier side Salon Palloilijat. Having made only eight appearances in all competitions for the club, Taiwo found himself released in June 2022.

== International career ==
=== Youth career ===
In May 2005, Taiwo was called up to the Nigeria U20 squad for the FIFA World Youth Championship. He played his first match of the tournament against Brazil U20 and helped the U20 side keep a clean sheet, in a 0–0 draw on 12 June 2005. Taiwo then helped Nigeria U20 go through to the knockout stage after beating Switzerland U20 3–0 on Matchday Three. In a follow–up match, he scored his first goal of the tournament, in a 1–0 win against Ukraine U20 to progress to the next round. In the quarter–final match against Netherlands U20, Taiwo played the whole game which led to penalty shootout, and successfully converted the penalties, including the winning one to send the U20 side to the semi–finals. In the semi–finals against Morocco U20, he scored his second goal of the tournament, in a 3–0 win. In the final against Argentina U20, Taiwo started the whole game, as Nigeria U20 lost 2–1. Following the tournament, he was named the third best player in the tournament behind Mikel John Obi and Lionel Messi.

In July 2008, there were questions whether Taiwo would be included in the Nigeria U23 squad for the Summer Olympics in Beijing, China. It was confirmed on three separate times that he would not be included in the squad in the end. Unfortunately in his absence, Nigeria U23 would later earn a silver medal after losing 1–0 against Argentina U23.

=== Senior career ===
Having previously been called up to the Nigeria squad throughout the earliest 2004, Taiwo made his debut for the senior team, starting a match, in a 2–1 loss against South Africa on 17 November 2004.

In January 2006, Taiwo was called up to the Nigeria squad for the African Cup of Nations in Egypt. He started the tournament well by scoring the national side's first goal of the tournament, in a 1–0 win against Ghana. He then helped Nigeria win the next two matches to help the national side go through to the knockout stage. Taiwo played the whole game against Tunisia in the quarter–final, which led to penalty shootout following a 1–1 draw, and successfully converted the penalty, as Nigeria won 6–5 in the shootout. He later helped the national side finish third place in the tournament after beating Senegal 1–0 in the third place play–off.

A year later on 17 June 2007, Taiwo then played an important role for Nigeria when he scored his second national team goal, in a 3–1 win against Niger to qualify for the 2008 Africa Cup of Nations. Taiwo then scored his third Nigeria goal, in a 1–0 win against Switzerland on 19 November 2007. In December 2007, he was called up to the national team squad for the tournament. Taiwo eventually made it to the 23 men squad the following month. He started in all four matches in the African Cup of Nations, as Nigeria were eliminated in the quarter–finals following a 2–1 loss against Ghana.

Following the conclusion to the Africa Cup of Nations, Taiwo kept Nigeria six consecutive clean sheets in the World Cup qualifying round between 1 June 2008 and 1 September 2008. However, he was sent–off for a second bookable offence, in a 0–0 draw against Jamaica on 11 February 2009. Taiwo later helped Nigeria qualify for the 2010 FIFA World Cup after beating Kenya 3–2 on 14 November 2009.

In January 2010, Taiwo made the Nigeria cut when he was called up to the national team squad for the Africa Cup of Nations. Taiwo started the whole game on Matchday 1 Group stage, in a 3–1 loss against Egypt on 12 January 2010. However, he remained on the substitute bench in Nigeria's next four matches, with Elderson Echiéjilé preferred in the left–back position. On 30 January 2010, Taiwo returned to the starting line–up against Algeria for the third place play–offs and helped the national team side win 1–0 to earn a bronze medal.

In April 2010, Taiwo was among 44 players shortlisted for the Nigeria squad ahead of the FIFA World Cup in South Africa. Eventually, he made the cut to be in the World Cup squad after Manager Lars Lagerbäck cut the squad to 23. Taiwo made his World Cup debut against Argentina on 12 June 2010 and started a match before suffering an injury in the 74th minute, resulting in him being substituted. After the match, he quickly recovered from his injury following an operation and returned to the starting line–up against Greece and played 55 minutes before being substituted, as the national team lost 2–1. Following this, Taiwo was once again injured and sidelined for the follow–up against South Korea, resulting in Nigeria's elimination following a 2–2 draw.

Following the end of the World Cup, Taiwo featured four times in the African Cup of Nations qualification, as Nigeria were eliminated in the qualification round. Between 2004 and 2012, he played 53 games for the national team and scored 5 goals. Having not played for Nigeria since 2012, Manager Stephen Keshi said in 2012 about Taiwo, saying: "I am still working on my list but Taiwo, like other players, is under consideration."

== Personal life ==
Growing up, Taiwo has two sisters and three brothers. He is married to his wife, Nimota, and together, they have two children. Taiwo is a Muslim.

When he first moved to France, Taiwo began learning French and managed to speak the language fluently. In April 2014, Taiwo had his house seized by the French authorities for not paying his debt.

== Career statistics ==
=== Club ===
As of match played 19 October 2019

Appearances and goals by club, season and competition
| Club | Season | League | | | National cup | | League cup | | Continental | | Other | | Total | |
| Club | Season | Division | Apps | Goals | Apps | Goals | Apps | Goals | Apps | Goals | Apps | Goals | Apps | Goals |
|---|---|---|---|---|---|---|---|---|---|---|---|---|---|---|
| Marseille | 2004–05 | Ligue 1 | 4 | 0 | 0 | 0 | 0 | 0 | 0 | 0 | — | | 4 | 0 |
| Marseille | 2005–06 | Ligue 1 | 30 | 1 | 1 | 0 | 1 | 0 | 9 | 1 | — | | 41 | 2 |
| Marseille | 2006–07 | Ligue 1 | 38 | 3 | 1 | 0 | 0 | 0 | 2 | 1 | — | | 41 | 4 |
| Marseille | 2007–08 | Ligue 1 | 28 | 3 | 1 | 0 | 1 | 0 | 10 | 2 | — | | 40 | 5 |
| Marseille | 2008–09 | Ligue 1 | 35 | 3 | 2 | 1 | 1 | 0 | 14 | 0 | — | | 52 | 4 |
| Marseille | 2009–10 | Ligue 1 | 27 | 3 | 1 | 0 | 1 | 0 | 8 | 0 | — | | 37 | 3 |
| Marseille | 2010–11 | Ligue 1 | 30 | 4 | 1 | 0 | 4 | 1 | 5 | 0 | 1 (Note: Appearance in Trophée des champions) | 0 | 41 | 5 |
| Marseille | Total | | 192 | 17 | 7 | 1 | 8 | 1 | 48 | 4 | 1 | 0 | 256 | 23 |
| AC Milan | 2011–12 | Serie A | 4 | 0 | 0 | 0 | — | | 4 | 0 | — | | 8 | 0 |
| AC Milan | 2012–13 | Serie A | 0 | 0 | 0 | 0 | — | | — | | — | | 0 | 0 |
| AC Milan | Total | | 4 | 0 | 0 | 0 | — | | 4 | 0 | — | | 8 | 0 |
| Queens Park Rangers (loan) | 2011–12 | Premier League | 15 | 1 | 0 | 0 | 0 | 0 | — | | — | | 15 | 1 |
| Dynamo Kyiv (loan) | 2012–13 | Ukrainian Premier League | 20 | 0 | 1 | 1 | — | | 10 | 0 | — | | 31 | 1 |
| Bursaspor | 2013–14 | Süper Lig | 27 | 2 | 8 | 0 | — | | 2 | 1 | — | | 37 | 3 |
| Bursaspor | 2014–15 | Süper Lig | 0 | 0 | 0 | 0 | — | | — | | — | | 0 | 0 |
| Bursaspor | Total | | 27 | 2 | 8 | 0 | — | | 2 | 1 | — | | 37 | 3 |
| HJK | 2015 | Veikkausliiga | 11 | 0 | 0 | 0 | 0 | 0 | 0 | 0 | — | | 11 | 0 |
| HJK | 2016 | Veikkausliiga | 21 | 6 | 3 | 0 | 5 | 2 | 0 | 0 | — | | 29 | 8 |
| HJK | Total | | 32 | 6 | 3 | 0 | 5 | 2 | 0 | 0 | — | | 40 | 8 |
| Lausanne-Sport | 2016–17 | Swiss Super League | 13 | 0 | 0 | 0 | — | | — | | — | | 13 | 0 |
| AFC Eskilstuna | 2017 | Allsvenskan | 9 | 0 | 0 | 0 | — | | — | | — | | 9 | 0 |
| RoPS | 2018 | Veikkausliiga | 33 | 1 | 0 | 0 | — | | — | | — | | 33 | 1 |
| RoPS | 2019 | Veikkausliiga | 27 | 1 | 2 | 0 | — | | 2 | 0 | — | | 31 | 1 |
| RoPS | Total | | 60 | 2 | 2 | 0 | — | | 2 | 0 | — | | 64 | 2 |
| Career total | | | 372 | 28 | 21 | 2 | 11 | 3 | 68 | 5 | 1 | 0 | 473 | 38 |

=== International ===
Appearances and goals by national team and year
| National team | Year | Apps | Goals |
|---|---|---|---|
| Nigeria | 2004 | 1 | 0 |
| Nigeria | 2005 | 2 | 0 |
| Nigeria | 2006 | 8 | 1 |
| Nigeria | 2007 | 9 | 3 |
| Nigeria | 2008 | 12 | 0 |
| Nigeria | 2009 | 4 | 0 |
| Nigeria | 2010 | 7 | 0 |
| Nigeria | 2011 | 9 | 1 |
| Nigeria | 2012 | 1 | 0 |
| Total | | 53 | 5 |

Scores and results list Nigeria's goal tally first, score column indicates score after each Taiwo goal.

List of international goals scored by Taye Taiwo
| No. | Date | Venue | Opponent | Score | Result | Competition | Ref. |
|---|---|---|---|---|---|---|---|
| 1 | 23 January 2006 | Port Said Stadium, Port Said, Egypt | Ghana | 1–0 | 1–0 | 2006 Africa Cup of Nations | |
| 2 | 6 February 2007 | Griffin Park, London, England | Ghana | 1–3 | 1–4 | Friendly | |
| 3 | 17 June 2007 | Stade Général Seyni Kountché, Niamey, Niger | Niger | 2–1 | 3–1 | 2008 Africa Cup of Nations qualification | |
| 4 | 20 November 2007 | Letzigrund, Zürich, Switzerland | Switzerland | 1–0 | 1–0 | Friendly | |
| 5 | 9 February 2011 | Teslim Balogun Stadium, Lagos, Nigeria | Sierra Leone | 1–0 | 2–1 | Friendly | |

== Honours ==
Marseille

- Ligue 1: 2009–10
- Coupe de la Ligue: 2009–10, 2010–11
- Trophée des Champions: 2010
- UEFA Intertoto Cup: 2005

Nigeria

- Africa Cup of Nations third place: 2006

Individual

- CAF Most Promising Talent of the Year: 2006
- CAF Team of the Year: 2006, 2008, 2010, 2011
- Ligue 1 Team of the Year: 2007–08, 2008–09, 2010–11
- Veikkausliiga Player of the Month: May 2017,
- Veikkausliiga Team of the Year: 2016, 2018
