= Lassi Lappalainen =

Finnish footballer (born 1998)

Personal information
- Full name: Lassi Roni Kasperi Lappalainen
- Date of birth: 24 August 1998 (age 28)
- Place of birth: Espoo, Finland
- Height: 1.83 m (6 ft 0 in)
- Position: Winger

Team information
- Current team: HJK
- Number: 26

Youth career
- –2010: EPS
- 2011–2015: HJK

Senior career*
Years	Team	Apps	(Gls)
2015–2016	Klubi 04	21	(10)
2015–2019	HJK	30	(3)
2017–2018	→ RoPS (loan)	39	(12)
2019–2021	Bologna	0	(0)
2019–2021	→ CF Montréal (Note: "Montreal Impact" before name change to CF Montréal in 2021) (loan)	39	(10)
2022–2024	CF Montréal	60	(5)
2025	Columbus Crew	20	(1)
2026–	HJK	22	(4)

International career^{‡}
2013–2014	Finland U16	5	(1)
2014	Finland U17	7	(0)
2016	Finland U18	2	(0)
2016–2017	Finland U19	6	(5)
2017–2018	Finland U21	7	(3)
2019–2021	Finland	9	(0)
- * Club domestic league appearances and goals as of 12 November 2026 ‡ National team caps and goals as of 22:25, 16 June 2021 (UTC)

Lassi Roni Kasperi Lappalainen (born 24 August 1998) is a Finnish professional footballer who plays as a winger for Veikkausliiga club HJK.

== Club career ==
=== Early career ===
Born in Espoo in 1998, Lappalainen started his football career with Espoon Palloseura (EPS) and later moved to HJK youth team. Lappalainen played in Klubi 04, the reserve team of HJK.

=== HJK ===
In 2016, Lappalainen was called up for HJK's first team. On 2 April 2016, he made his Veikkausliiga debut against IFK Mariehamn at Sonera Stadium, being substituted on by coach Mika Lehkosuo in place of Nnamdi Oduamadi in the 90th minute. Lappalainen also represented HJK youth in UEFA Youth League twice, in 2015–16 and 2016–17.

==== RoPS (loan) ====
On 21 July 2017, Lappalainen was loaned to RoPS for remainder of the Veikkausliiga season. Two days later, he scored his first league goal for RoPS just five minutes into his debut after coming on as a substitute.

=== Bologna ===
On 19 July 2019, Lappalainen signed to Italian Serie A club Bologna. HJK Helsinki stated it received "significant compensation" and that economically, the transfer was in the "top 7 of HJK's club history". The transfer fee was later reported to be €700.000.

=== CF Montreal ===
On 25 July 2019, it was announced that Lappalainen was loaned to Major League Soccer (MLS) franchise Montreal Impact, later renamed as CF Montréal, for the remainder of the 2019 season using $180,000 of the Targeted Allocation Money. The Impact have options to extend the loan until 30 June 2020, as well as until 31 December 2020. On 27 July 2019, he contributed two goals to Montreal Impact's 4–0 victory over the first-place Philadelphia Union on his MLS debut.

On 3 December 2021, Lappalainen's move to Montréal was made permanent, on a deal until the end of 2024, with an option to extend it. In late November 2024 it was announced he would leave the club after the 2024 season.

=== Columbus Crew ===
Lappalainen joined Major League Soccer side Columbus Crew on 8 January 2025, on a one-year contract with a club option for 2026. At the end of season Lappalainen's contract option was declined.

=== Second Stint at HJK ===
On 5 February 2026, he re-signed for Veikkausliiga side HJK on a two-year contract.

== International career ==
Lappalainen made his debut for the Finland national team on 8 January 2019 in a friendly against Sweden, as a starter.

Lappalainen was called up for the UEFA Euro 2020 pre-tournament friendly match against Sweden on 29 May 2021.

== Career statistics ==
=== Club ===
As of 11 October 2024

Appearances and goals by club, season and competition
Club	Season	League			National cup (Note: Includes Suomen Cup, Finnish League Cup and Canadian Championship)		League cup		Continental		Other		Total	
Club	Season	Division	Apps	Goals	Apps	Goals	Apps	Goals	Apps	Goals	Apps	Goals	Apps	Goals
Klubi 04	2015	Kakkonen	14	7	0	0	–		–		–		14	7
Klubi 04	2016	Kakkonen	5	1	0	0	–		–		–		5	1
Klubi 04	2017	Kakkonen	2	2	0	0	–		–		–		2	2
Klubi 04	Total		21	10	0	0	0	0	0	0	0	0	21	10
HJK	2015	Veikkausliiga	0	0	0	0	1 (Note: Appearance(s) in Finnish League Cup)	0	0	0	–		1	0
HJK	2016	Veikkausliiga	14	0	1	0	4	0	0	0	–		19	0
HJK	2017	Veikkausliiga	0	0	5	1	–		1 (Note: Appearance(s) in the UEFA Europa League)	0	–		6	1
HJK	2018	Veikkausliiga	0	0	0	0	–		0	0	–		0	0
HJK	2019	Veikkausliiga	16	3	5	1	–		2 (Note: Appearance(s) in the UEFA Champions League)	2	–		23	6
HJK	Total		30	3	11	2	5	0	3	2	0	0	49	7
RoPS (loan)	2017	Veikkausliiga	13	4	0	0	–		–		–		13	4
RoPS (loan)	2018	Veikkausliiga	26	8	5	3	–		–		–		31	11
RoPS (loan)	Total		39	12	5	3	0	0	0	0	0	0	44	15
Bologna	2019–20	Serie A	0	0	0	0	–		–		0	0	0	0
CF Montréal (loan)	2019	MLS	11	5	4	0	–		–		0	0	15	5
CF Montréal (loan)	2020	MLS	13	4	0	0	–		–		1 (Note: Appearance(s) in the MLS is Back Tournament)	0	14	4
CF Montréal (loan)	2021	MLS	15	1	3	0	–		–		0	0	18	1
CF Montréal (loan)	Total		39	10	7	0	0	0	0	0	1	0	47	10
CF Montréal	2022	MLS	28	3	0	0	–		4 (Note: Appearance(s) in the CONCACAF Champions League)	0	2 (Note: Appearance(s) in the MLS Cup Playoffs)	0	34	3
CF Montréal	2023	MLS	21	2	2	0	2 (Note: Appearance(s) in Leagues Cup)	0	–		0	0	25	2
CF Montréal	2024	MLS	11	0	0	0	0	0	0	0	0	0	11	0
CF Montréal	Total		60	5	2	0	2	0	4	0	2	0	70	5
Columbus Crew	2025	MLS	0	0	0	0	–		–		–		0	0
Career total			144	36	23	5	5	0	3	2	1	0	176	43

=== International ===
As of match played on 16 June 2021.

Appearances and goals by national team and year
National team	Year	Apps	Goals
Finland	2019	7	0
Finland	2020	0	0
Finland	2021	2	0
Total		9	0

== Honours ==
Montreal Impact

- Canadian Championship: 2019 2021
