= Lassi Järvenpää =

Finnish footballer (born 1996)

Personal information
- Full name: Lassi Ville Järvenpää
- Date of birth: 28 October 1996 (age 30)
- Place of birth: Helsinki, Finland
- Height: 1.86 m (6 ft 1 in)
- Position: Right back

Team information
- Current team: Reipas Lahti
- Number: 16

Senior career*
Years	Team	Apps	(Gls)
2014–2016	Klubi 04	34	(1)
2016	HJK	0	(0)
2016	→ RoPS (loan)	6	(0)
2017–2018	RoPS	47	(2)
2019–2020	IFK Mariehamn	39	(0)
2021	Inter Turku	24	(0)
2022–2023	Lahti	9	(0)
2024–	Reipas Lahti	15	(0)
- * Club domestic league appearances and goals as of 25 September 2024

Lassi Ville Järvenpää (born 28 October 1996) is a Finnish professional footballer who plays for Reipas Lahti in Kakkonen, as a right back.

== Career ==
Järvenpää signed with IFK Mariehamn for the 2019, on a season long deal with an option to extend the deal with one year.

On 15 November 2021, he signed with Lahti for the 2022 season.
