= Kristian Heinolainen =

Finnish footballer (born 1999)

Personal information
- Date of birth: 11 May 1999 (age 27)
- Place of birth: Tallinn, Estonia
- Height: 1.76 m (5 ft 9 in)
- Position: Left back

Team information
- Current team: JS Hercules

Youth career
- FC Kontu
- KOPSE
- KäPa
- 2013–2014: HJK
- 2015: TuPS
- 2015: PKKU

Senior career*
Years	Team	Apps	(Gls)
2015	PKKU	8	(2)
2016	Gnistan	9	(0)
2017	HIFK	0	(0)
2018	PS Kemi	24	(0)
2019	SalPa	1	(0)
2019	TPS	7	(0)
2019	Kemi City	7	(1)
2020	AC Oulu	14	(0)
2021–	JS Hercules	20	(4)
- * Club domestic league appearances and goals as of 1 October 2021

Kristian Heinolainen (born 11 May 1999) is a Finnish professional footballer who plays for JS Hercules, as a defender.

== Career ==
Heinolainen played for FC Kontu, KOPSE, KäPa, HJK, TuPS and PKKU on youth level.

On 4 December 2019 AC Oulu announced, that they had signed Heinolainen from the 2020 season.

On 26 November 2020, he signed with third-tier club JS Hercules for the 2021 season.
