= Simo Roiha =

Finnish footballer (born 1991)

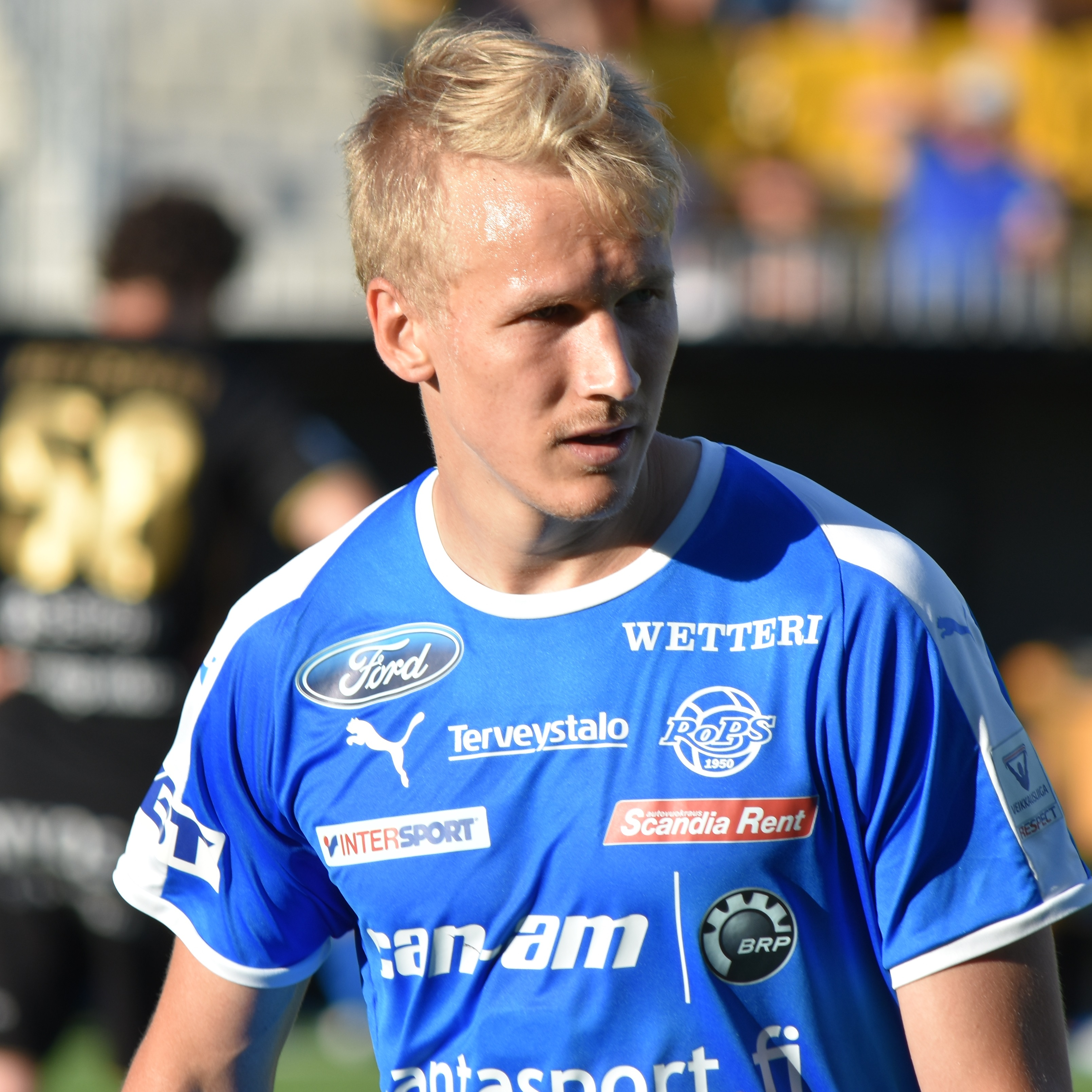
- Roiha with RoPS in 2018.

Personal information
- Date of birth: 27 December 1991 (age 34)
- Place of birth: Rovaniemi, Finland
- Position: Striker

Team information
- Current team: RoPS
- Number: 20

Senior career*
Years	Team	Apps	(Gls)
2011–2012	FC Santa Claus	47	(13)
2012–2018	RoPS	104	(19)
2015	→ FC Santa Claus (loan)	4	(0)
2016	→ FC Santa Claus (loan)	4	(1)
2019–2020	KPV	42	(5)
2021	RoPS	26	(13)
2022	TPS	29	(11)
2023	KTP	22	(1)
2024–	RoPS	69	(25)
- * Club domestic league appearances and goals as of 7 November 2026

Simo Roiha (born 27 December 1991) is a Finnish professional footballer who plays as a striker for RoPS.

== Career ==
Roiha signed with Kokkolan PV for the 2019 season.

On 12 December 2022, Roiha signed with KTP for the 2023 season, with a club option for 2024.
