= Wato Kuaté =

Footballer (born 1995)

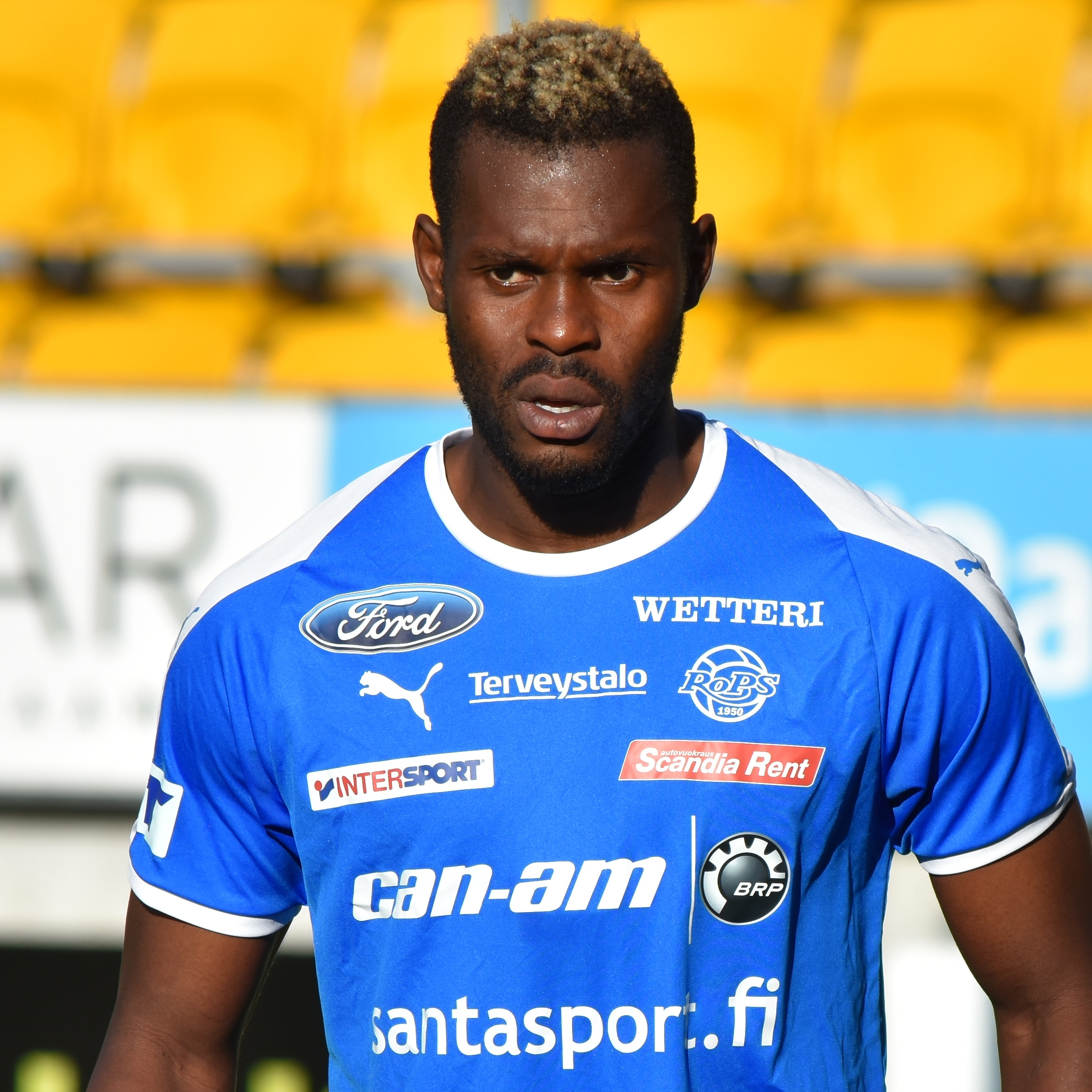
- Kuaté with RoPS in 2018

Personal information
- Full name: Guirlain Désiré Wato Kuaté
- Date of birth: 19 September 1995 (age 31)
- Place of birth: Douala, Cameroon
- Height: 1.84 m (6 ft 0 in)
- Position: Defensive midfielder

Team information
- Current team: Atletico Uri

Youth career
- 2009–2011: U.D. Leiria
- 2011–2012: Bellinzona
- 2012–2014: Manchester City

Senior career*
Years	Team	Apps	(Gls)
2014–2015	Akhisar Belediyespor	7	(0)
2015–2016	Asteras Tripolis	0	(0)
2016	→ Trikala (loan)	4	(0)
2017	Dundee United	3	(0)
2017–2018	Hapoel Petah Tikva	5	(0)
2018	RoPS	17	(1)
2018	Bisceglie	0	(0)
2020	RoPS	0	(0)
2021–2022	Górnik Mysłowice		
2023–	Atletico Uri	0	(0)
- * Club domestic league appearances and goals as of 7 July 2020

Guirlain Désiré Wato Kuaté (born 19 September 1995) is a professional footballer who plays as a defensive midfielder for Italian Serie D club Atletico Uri.

Kuaté was born in Douala, Cameroon, and also holds Portuguese nationality. During his career he has had short stints with Akhisar Belediyespor, Asteras Tripolis, Dundee United, Liga Leumit side Hapoel Petah Tikva, Rovaniemen Palloseura, and Serie C side Bisceglie.

== Career ==
Kuaté began his youth football career in Portugal with U.D. Leiria before joining AC Bellinzona in Switzerland. A successful trial led to him joining the Manchester City Academy in 2012. While in England, Kuaté was also on trial with Barnsley in 2013.

Kuaté signed for Akhisar Belediyespor in the Turkish Süper Lig during the January 2014 transfer window, after being released by Manchester City. He made his professional debut for Akhisar on 8 March 2014 in a 6–1 defeat against Galatasaray.

The following year, Kuaté signed a four-year contract with Super League Greece club Asteras Tripolis for an undisclosed fee. He made just one appearance for the club in the Greek Cup, although he was loaned to third-tier Greek Football League club Trikala for six months where he made just four league appearances before returning to Asteras.

Kuaté then signed a short-term contract with Scottish Championship club Dundee United in March 2017. He scored his first goal for the club in a Scottish Premiership promotion play-off match against Greenock Morton on 12 May 2017. During a subsequent play-off match against Hamilton Academical, Kuaté had an on-field physical altercation with teammate Mark Durnan, then reacted angrily to being substituted – storming off the field while making gestures towards, and sarcastically applauding, the home support. Dundee United manager Ray McKinnon publicly stated that Kuaté would not play for the club again, and Kuaté was subsequently released at the end of his contract.

On 18 October 2017, Kuaté signed with Liga Leumit side Hapoel Petah Tikva, but only made 5 appearances for the club.

Kuaté then transferred to Finnish Veikkausliiga club Rovaniemen Palloseura signing a one-year contract in March 2018. Kuaté made 17 league appearances for the club, scoring one goal, but his contract was terminated just four months later. RoPS Rovaniemi head coach Toni Koskela cited Kuaté's on-field disobedience along with his belief that he was bigger than the rest of the team.

In October 2018, Kuaté signed with Serie C side Bisceglie. However, he never played a match for the club and was released in December 2018.

On 10 December 2019, Kuaté returned to RoPS on a two-year contract. He only represented the club on pre-season friendlies and cup fixtures as the corona outbreak delayed the start of the season. The club terminated the contract on 26 June before the start of the season citing lack of commitment as the reason.

In October 2021, Kuaté signed with Polish club Górnik Mysłowice. He left in the summer 2022. In February 2023, he signed with Italian Serie D side Atletico Uri.

== Career statistics ==
As of match played 6 April 2018

Appearances and goals by club, season and competition
Club	Season	League			National cup		League cup		Other		Total	
Club	Season	Division	Apps	Goals	Apps	Goals	Apps	Goals	Apps	Goals	Apps	Goals
Akhisar Belediyespor	2013–14	Süper Lig	7	0	0	0	–		–		7	0
Akhisar Belediyespor	2014–15	Süper Lig	0	0	0	0	–		–		0	0
Akhisar Belediyespor	Total		7	0	0	0	–		–		7	0
Asteras Tripolis	2015–16	Super League Greece	0	0	1	0	–		–		1	0
Trikala (loan)	2015–16	Football League	4	0	0	0	–		–		4	0
Dundee United	2016–17	Scottish Championship	3	0	0	0	0	0	5 (Note: Appearances in Scottish Premiership play-offs)	1	8	1
Hapoel Petah Tikva	2017–18	Liga Leumit	5	0	0	0	–		–		5	0
RoPS	2018	Veikkausliiga	17	1	1	0	–		–		18	1
Career total			36	1	2	0	0	0	5	1	43	2
