= Aapo Heikkilä =

Finnish footballer (born 1994)

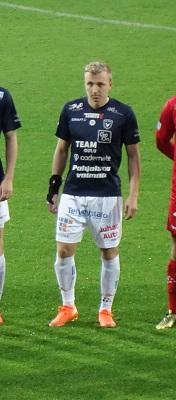
- Heikkilä with AC Oulu in 2020

Personal information
- Date of birth: 13 April 1994 (age 32)
- Place of birth: Haukipudas, Finland
- Height: 1.73 m (5 ft 8 in)
- Position: Winger

Senior career*
Years	Team	Apps	(Gls)
2012	HauPa	15	(3)
2013–2015	AC Oulu	58	(7)
2016–2018	RoPS	37	(2)
2018–2022	AC Oulu	93	(11)
- * Club domestic league appearances and goals as of 12:00, 9 February 2023 (UTC)

Aapo Heikkilä (born 13 April 1994) is a Finnish professional footballer who plays as a winger.
