= Jarkko Luiro =

Finnish footballer (born 1998)

Personal information
- Date of birth: 22 March 1998 (age 28)
- Position: Striker

Team information
- Current team: Rollon Pojat
- Number: 28

Senior career*
| Years | Team | Apps | (Gls) |
| 2015–2016 | FC Santa Claus | 25 | (12) |
| 2016–2022 | RoPS | 18 | (7) |
| 2022– | Rollon Pojat | 48 | (48) |
- * Club domestic league appearances and goals as of 11 January 2026

Jarkko Luiro (born 22 March 1998) is a Finnish professional footballer who plays for Rollon Pojat, as a striker.
