= Fugo Segawa =

Japanese footballer (born 1997)

Personal information
- Full name: Fugo Segawa
- Date of birth: 7 July 1997 (age 29)
- Place of birth: Ichikawa, Japan
- Height: 1.72 m (5 ft 8 in)
- Position: Left-back

Team information
- Current team: TSS Rovers

Youth career
- 2009–2012: SP Fute
- 2012–2015: FAB Academy
- 2015–2016: Mar Menor

Senior career*
Years	Team	Apps	(Gls)
2016–2017	Ånge IF	5	(0)
2017	PEPO	22	(3)
2018	RoPS	6	(0)
2019	AC Oulu	19	(0)
2020	York9 FC	5	(0)
2022–	TSS Rovers	13+	(0+)
- * Club domestic league appearances and goals as of July 29, 2023

Fugo Segawa (世川 楓悟, Segawa Fūgo; born 7 July 1997) is a Japanese professional footballer who plays as a left-back for TSS Rovers in League1 British Columbia.

== Early life ==
Beginning at age 12, Segawa played for SP Fute in his hometown of Ichikawa. At age 15, he left Japan to attend boarding school in England, where he also attended FAB Academy, an English National Sports Centre. He first attended Teikyo School London before switching to Queens' School, a secondary boarding school in nearby Hertfordshire.

== Playing career ==
In 2016, Segawa played for Swedish Division 2 side Ånge IF.

In 2017, Segawa played for Finnish Kakkonen side PEPO, making 22 appearances that season and scoring three goals.

In 2018, Segawa joined Finnish Veikkausliiga side RoPS. That season, he made six league appearances and five in the Finnish Cup.

On 12 December 2018, Segawa signed with Finnish Ykkönen side AC Oulu. That season, he made nineteen league appearances and five in the Finnish Cup.

On 10 February 2020, Segawa signed with Canadian Premier League side York9 after he was identified by the league's centralized scouting system.

In March 2022, he signed for League1 British Columbia side TSS Rovers.

== Career statistics ==
As of July 29, 2023

Club	Season	League			Playoffs		Cup		Continental		Total	
Club	Season	Division	Apps	Goals	Apps	Goals	Apps	Goals	Apps	Goals	Apps	Goals
Ånge IF	2016	Div 2 Norrland	5	0	–		0	0	–		5	0
PEPO	2017	Kakkonen	22	3	–		0	0	–		22	3
RoPS	2018	Veikkausliiga	6	0	–		5 (Note: Appearances in the Finnish Cup)	0	–		11	0
AC Oulu	2019	Ykkönen	19	0	–		5	0	–		24	0
York9	2020	Canadian Premier League	5	0	–		–		–		5	0
TSS FC Rovers	2022	League1 British Columbia	?	?	?	?	–		–		?	?
TSS FC Rovers	2023	League1 British Columbia	13	0	1	0	2	0	–		16	0
Career total			70+	3	1	0	12	0	0	0	70+	3
